= Lincoln Motor Company =

Luxury division of Ford Motor Company

- Formerly: Lincoln Motor Company (1917–1945); Lincoln-Mercury (1945–2012)
- Type: Private (1917–1922); Division (1922–present)
- Industry: Automotive
- Founded: August 1917; 109 years ago (as "Lincoln Motor Company")
- Founders: Henry M. Leland; Wilfred Leland
- Fate: Acquired by Ford in 1922, becoming a division of it
- Headquarters: Detroit, Michigan, U.S.
- Area served: East Asia (China (except Hong Kong and Macau), South Korea); North America (United States, Canada, Mexico, Dominican Republic, Panama); Middle East (except Iran and Syria)
- Key people: Joaquin Nuño‑Whelan (President)
- Products: Luxury cars
- Parent: Ford Motor Company (1922–present)
- Website: lincoln.com

Lincoln Motor Company, or simply Lincoln, is the luxury vehicle division of American automobile manufacturer Ford Motor Company. Marketed among the top luxury vehicle brands in the United States, Lincoln is positioned closely against its General Motors counterpart Cadillac. Starting with the 2021 model year, the brand solely offers SUV and crossover vehicles.

The division helped to establish the personal luxury car segment with the 1940 Lincoln Continental.

Lincoln Motor Company was founded in 1917 by Henry M. Leland, naming it after Abraham Lincoln. In February 1922, the company was acquired by Ford, its parent company to this day. Following World War II, Ford formed the Lincoln-Mercury Division, pairing Lincoln with its mid-range Mercury brand; the pairing lasted until the 2010 closure of Mercury. At the end of 2012, Lincoln reverted to its original name, Lincoln Motor Company. Following the divestiture of the Premier Automotive Group (Jaguar, Land Rover, Aston Martin, and Volvo) and the closure of Mercury, Lincoln remains the sole luxury nameplate of the Ford Motor Company.

Originally founded as a freestanding division above Lincoln, Continental was integrated within Lincoln in 1959. For 1969, the Continental-branded Mark series was marketed through Lincoln, adopting the Lincoln name for 1986. The Lincoln four-point star emblem is derived from a badge introduced on the 1956 Continental Mark II; the current version was introduced in 1980.

The current product range of Lincoln consists of luxury crossovers and sport-utility vehicles. Throughout its entire prior existence Lincoln also produced luxury car-based vehicles for limousine and livery use; several examples have served as official state limousines for Presidents of the United States. Today, this niche is filled from its crossover and SUV lineup.

In 2017, Lincoln sold 188,383 vehicles globally. Outside of North America, Lincoln vehicles are officially sold in the Middle East (except Iran and Syria), China (except Hong Kong and Macau), and South Korea.

== History ==
=== Early years (1917–1930) ===
The Lincoln Motor Company was founded in August 1917 by Henry Leland and his son Wilfred. Among the founders of Cadillac, Leland had sold Cadillac to General Motors in 1909; staying on as an executive, he left in 1917 over a dispute with GM President William Durant regarding war production.

Leland named Lincoln Motor Company after Abraham Lincoln, stating that Lincoln was the first President for whom he ever voted (1864). The company was financed by securing a $10,000,000 (equivalent to $250,000,000 in 2025) contract to produce Liberty V12 aircraft engines for use during World War I. The Lelands broke ground on the Lincoln Motor Company Plant in Detroit. Lincoln Motor Company acted as the final assembly point for the engines, with the company securing parts from other manufacturers; cylinders were produced by Ford, with other parts sourced from Buick, Cadillac, Marmon, and Packard.

In total, Lincoln Motor Company would assemble 6,500 Liberty V12 engines by the end of World War I concluding production; by the end of the war, Lincoln would employ 6,000 workers.

On January 26, 1920, Lincoln Motor Company was reorganized as an automobile manufacturer, retooling its Detroit factory to produce automobiles. On September 16, 1920, Lincoln Motor Company produced its first automobile, the Lincoln Model L.

Lincoln Motor Company had struggled with the transition from military to automobile production, with some customers having to wait nearly a year for their vehicles to be completed from the time of purchase. By 1922, the company was on the verge of bankruptcy and was placed in receivership.

Under the influence of Edsel Ford, Lincoln Motor Company was purchased by Henry Ford for $8,000,000 (equivalent to $150,000,000 in 2025) on February 4, 1922. While Lincoln was valued at $16 million, a $5 million bid by Ford was the sole bid received for the company (forced to be increased by the court).

==== Purchase by Ford Motor Company ====
Following the purchase of Lincoln Motor Company by Ford Motor Company, Henry and Wilfred Leland remained at the company, with Edsel Ford given responsibility over it. While Ford had sought to expand its model range beyond the Ford Model T, the purchase of Lincoln held a degree of personal value, as the owners of Lincoln developed an automobile company from one that Henry Ford had been forced from. In 1902, a group of investors (led by Leland) forced Henry Ford from his second company, the Henry Ford Company; the company was reorganized as Cadillac (deriving its name from the founder of Detroit). With the exception of the engine, the 1903 Ford Model A and the 1903 Cadillac Model A share nearly the same design.

Prior to the introduction of the Model T, Ford designed several higher-priced vehicles, including the 1904 Ford Model B, the 1905 Ford Model F, and the 1906 Ford Model K. Following its organization in 1908, General Motors began a rapid expansion of its automotive brands; by 1920, GM would outnumber Ford five to one. The purchase of Lincoln created a stand-alone luxury vehicle brand for Ford as Cadillac did for GM.

Within the first few months, relations between Ford Motor Company and Lincoln management began to break down; on June 10, 1922, the Lelands were forced to resign. As Edsel Ford began to take a senior role in the management of Lincoln, multiple changes were made to both the Model L and its production. The Lincoln factory was redesigned and expanded (to nearly 1,000,000 square feet), with the components of the engine upgraded for increased reliability and performance.

At its introduction, the Lincoln Model L gained a reputation for conservative (to the point of outdated) design. As a response, Edsel Ford introduced the Model L for 1923 in a custom-bodied form directly from Lincoln; in line with a Duesenberg or a Rolls-Royce, customers could also purchase a Model L with coachbuilt bodywork.

For 1923, Lincoln produced 7,875 cars (nearly 45% higher than in 1922). After struggling to deliver cars before 1922, Lincoln was operating at a profit by the end of 1923.

In 1924, a Lincoln Model L became the first state limousine used by a U.S. President on an official basis, supplied for Calvin Coolidge.

By 1930, Lincoln had succeeded in only a decade in what its chief competitors had taken 30 years to accomplish. Serving as a direct competitor to Cadillac, the Model L had become equal to vehicles from established American brands including Duesenberg, Marmon, Packard, Peerless, and Pierce-Arrow.

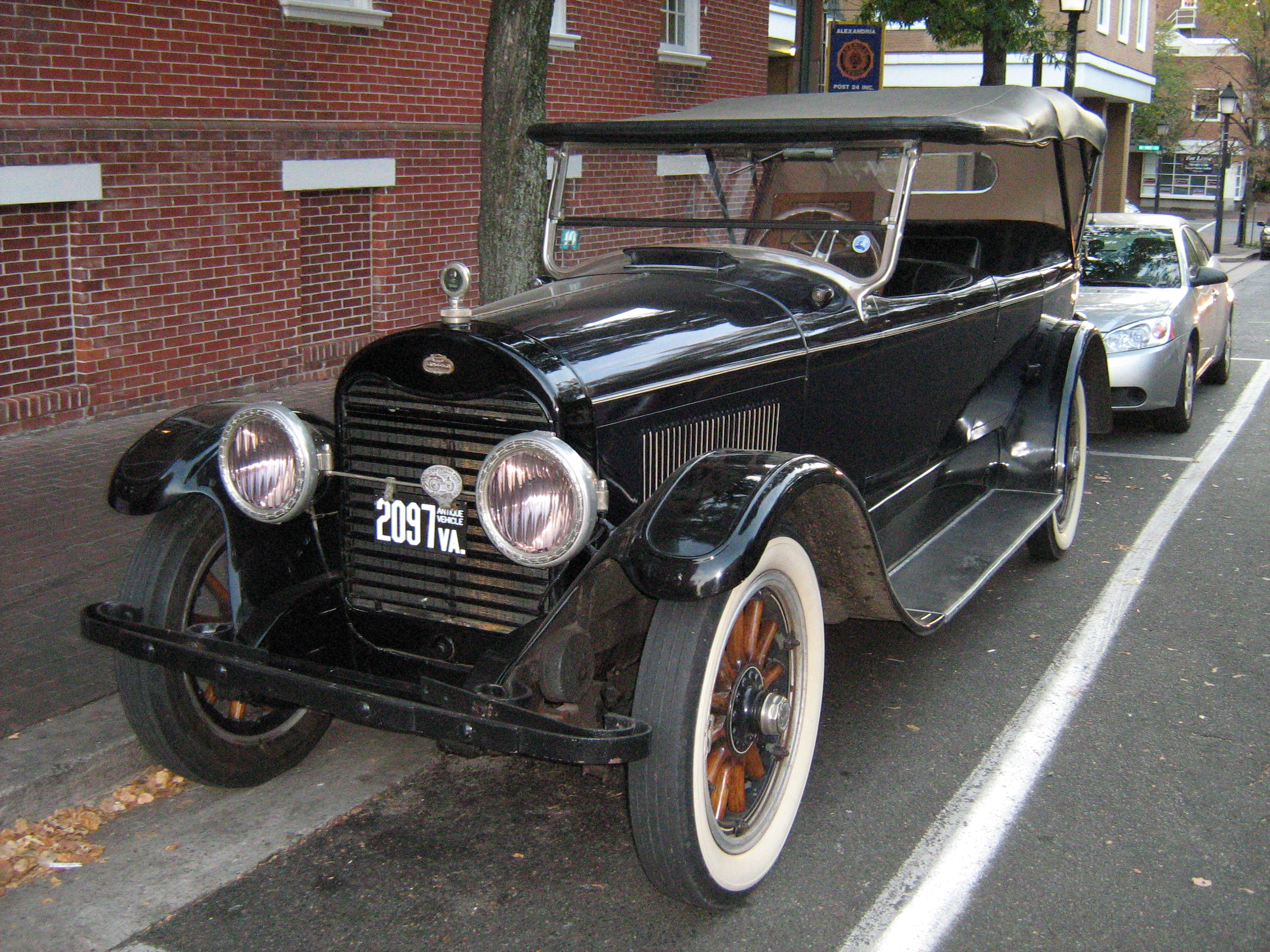
1922 Lincoln Model L touring sedan

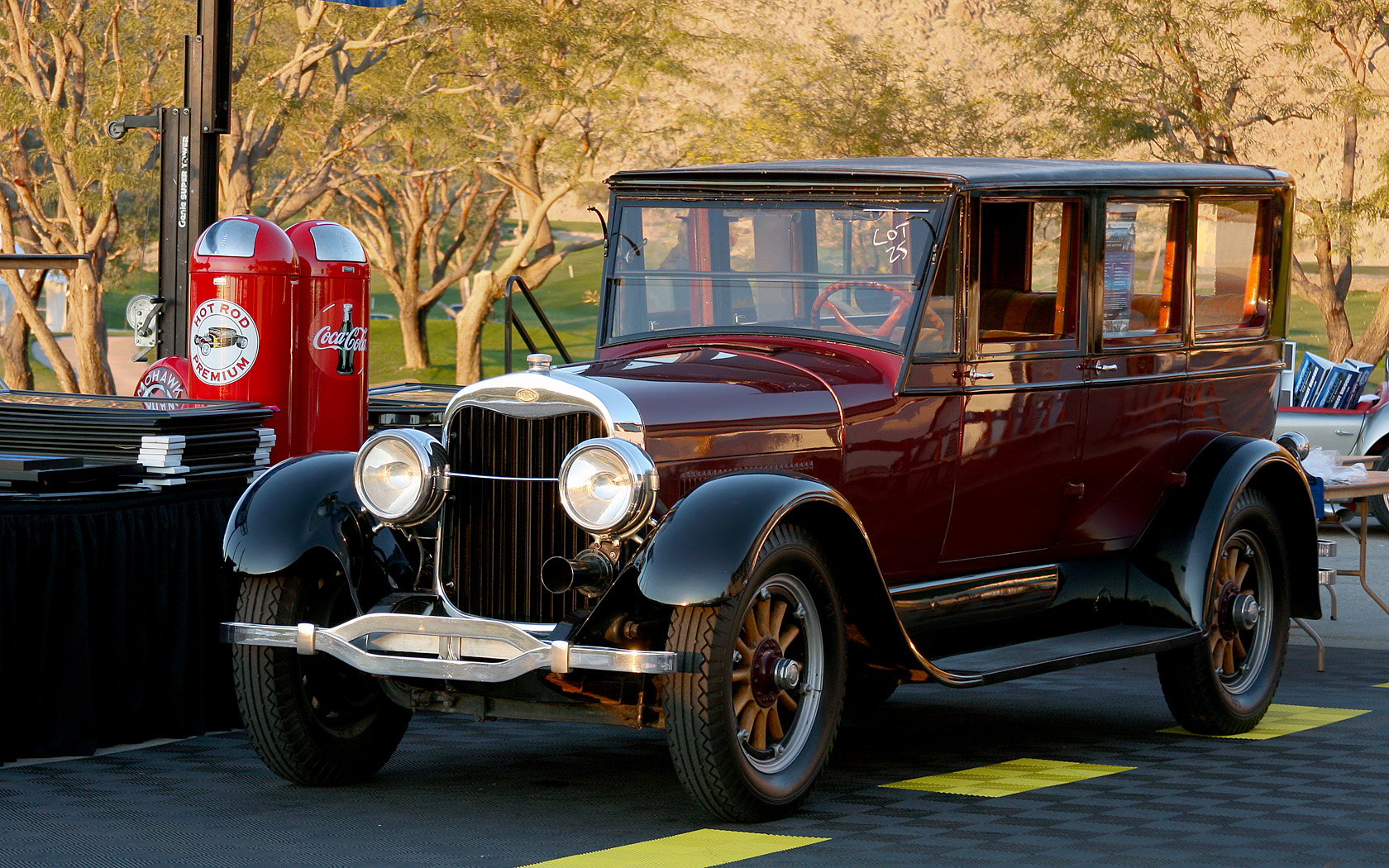
1925 Lincoln Model L sedan (of Greta Garbo)

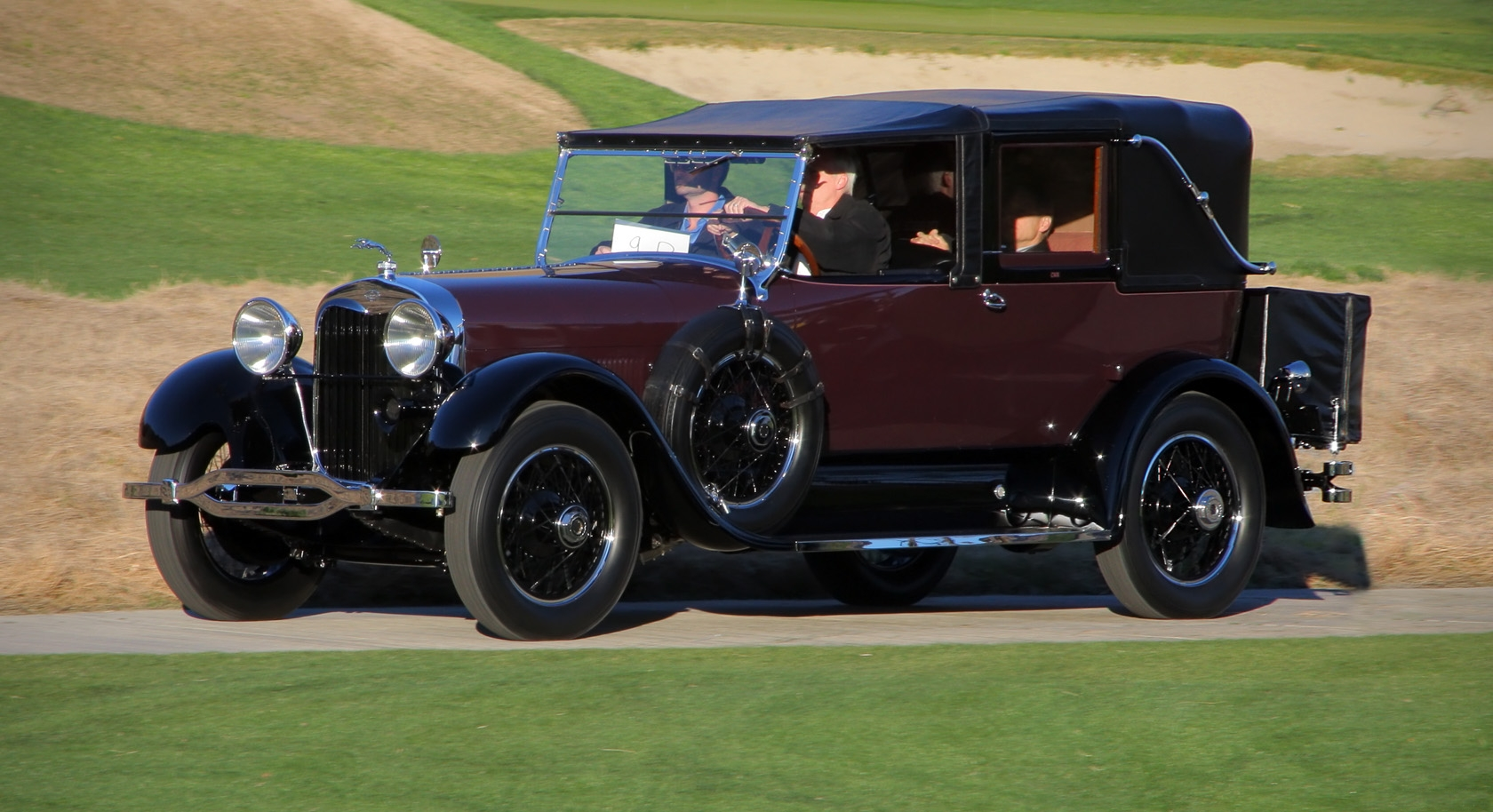
1926 Lincoln Model L town car

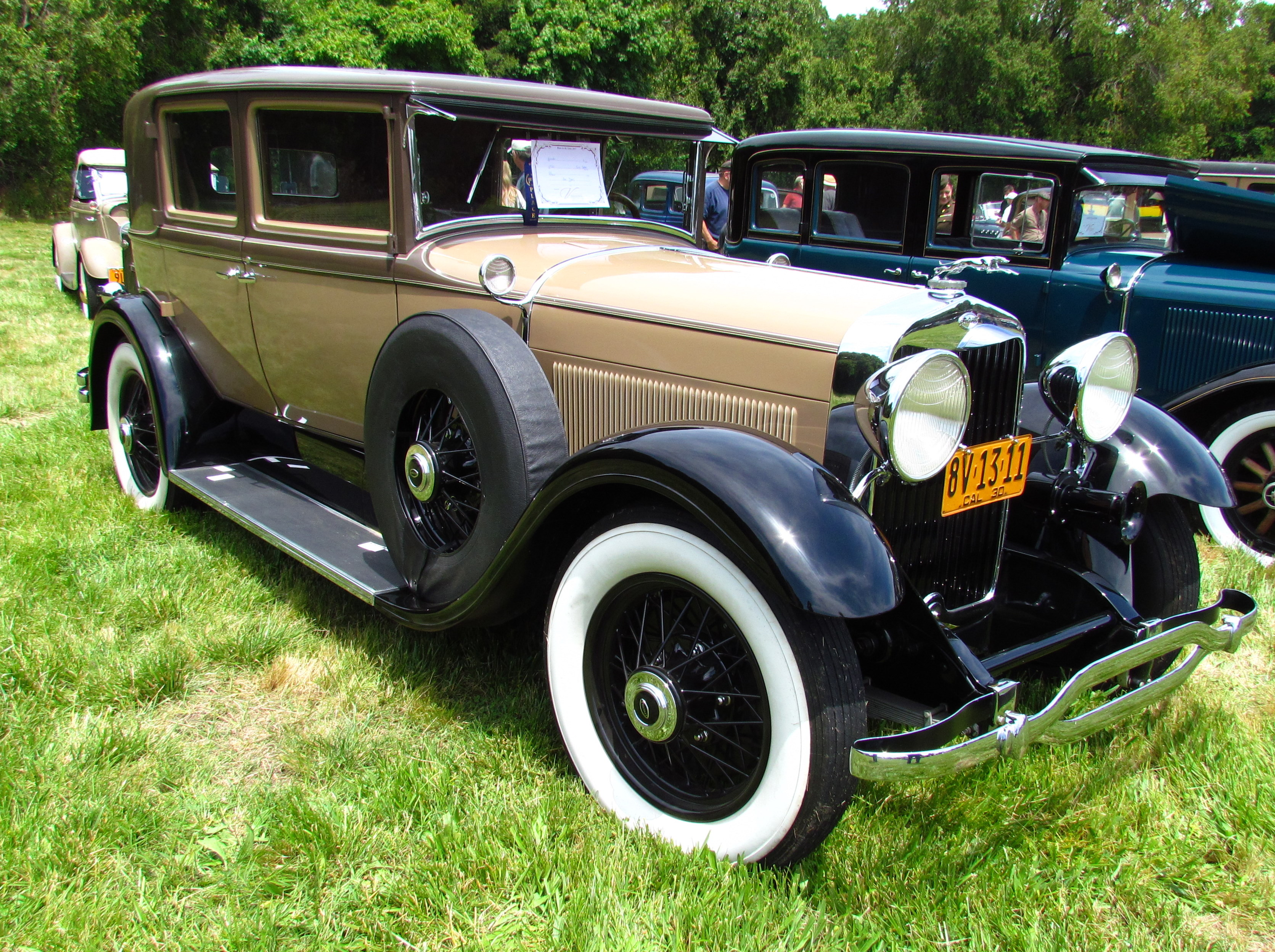
1930 Lincoln Model L sedan

=== 1930s ===
During the production of the Model L, Lincoln did not adopt the common American automotive industry practice of yearly model changes. While the company had made minor revisions and upgrades to the model line to the chassis and powertrain, the body was largely left alone over its 10-year production, a business model shared with the Ford Model T. Lincoln found that customer interest was accommodated by the purchase of multiple Lincolns (or other luxury vehicles) in different body styles; as many Lincolns were custom-bodied from the factory or coachbuilt, yearly styling changes would not properly accommodate its customer base.

For the 1931 model year, the Model L was replaced by the Lincoln Model K. An all-new design (on a longer, lower chassis), the Model K introduced upgrades to the carburetor, brakes, and suspension. Competing against the Cadillac 355, Chrysler Imperial, Duesenberg Model J, and Packard Eight, the Model K offered both factory-designed bodies and coachbuilt designs.

For 1932, Lincoln introduced its first "multi-cylinder" engine, introducing a V12 engine for the Model K. The next year, the V8 was retired, making Lincoln the first manufacturer in the world to produce vehicles exclusively with V12 engines.

For 1935, Lincoln was positioned upward in price. While limiting sales, the move increased profitability per vehicle; at over $4,000 (equivalent to $94,000 in 2025) for a factory body, the Model K competed against the Rolls-Royce Phantom II, Renault Reinastella, Duesenberg Model J, Mercedes-Benz Typ3 630 and the Cadillac V-12 (and V-16).

Largely overshadowed by the Lincoln-Zephyr, the final Model K was assembled during 1939. The company has since not developed a direct successor to the Model K line.

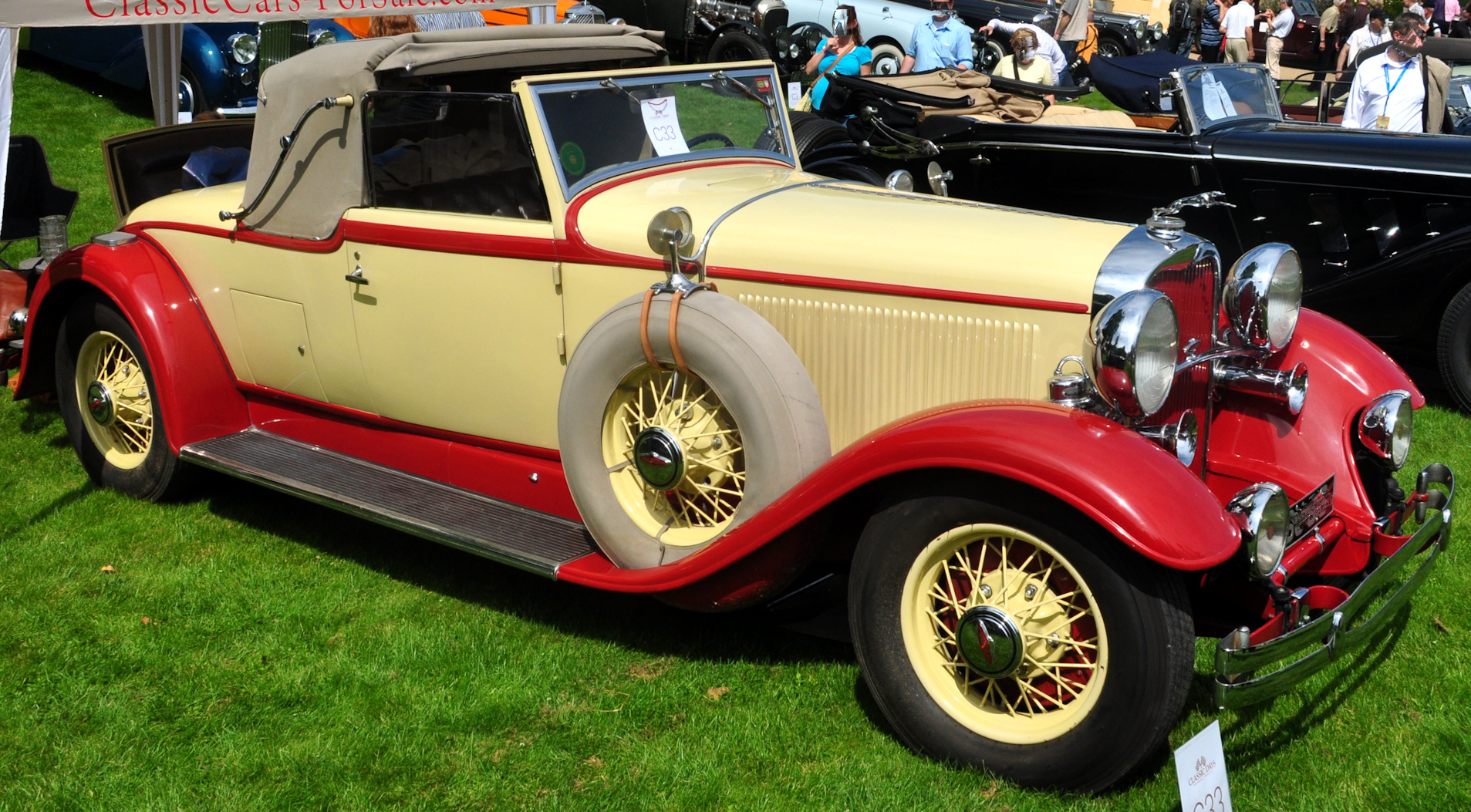
1931 Lincoln Model K

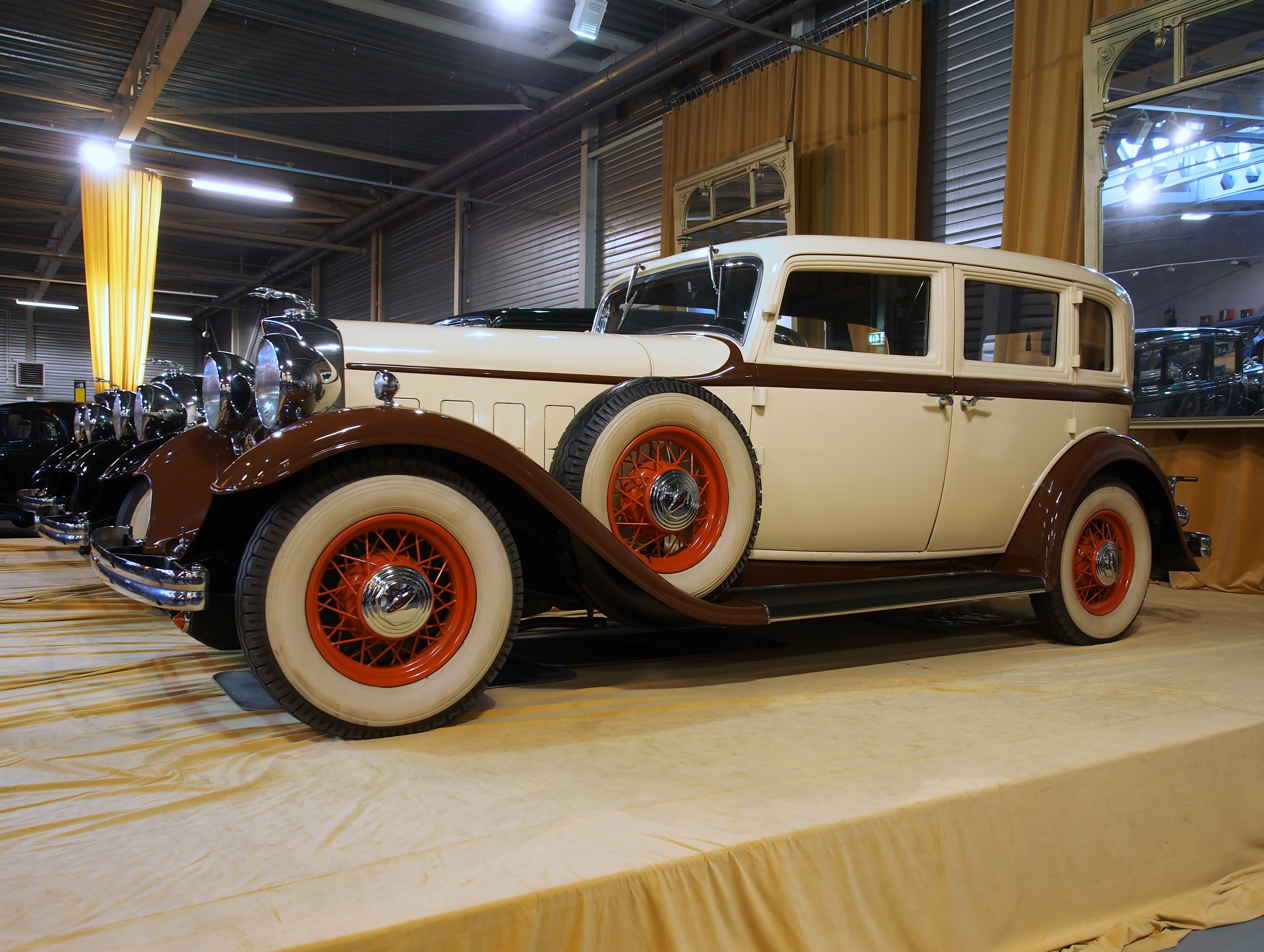
1932 Lincoln Model KA (V8) six-window sedan

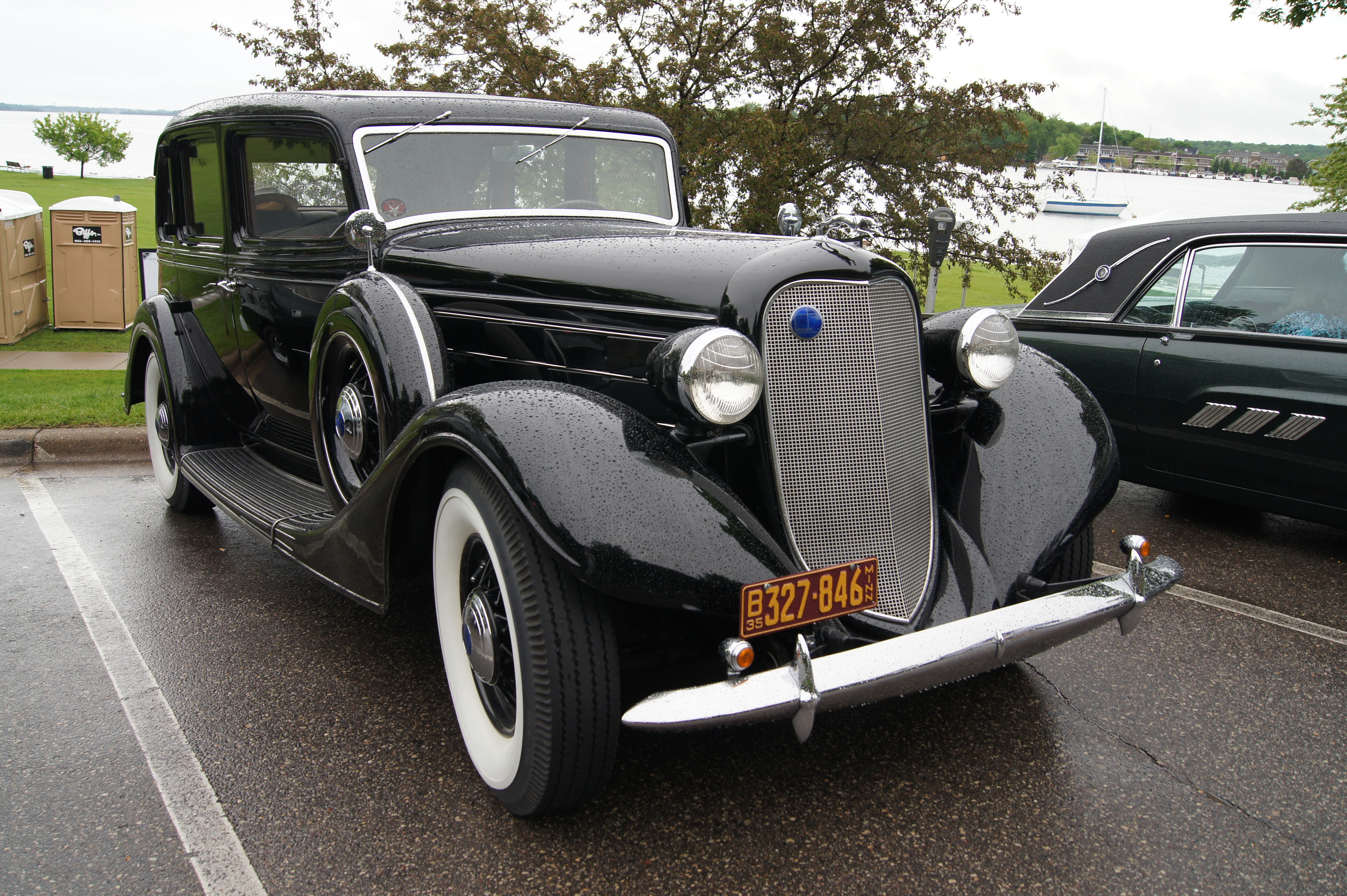
1935 Lincoln Model K

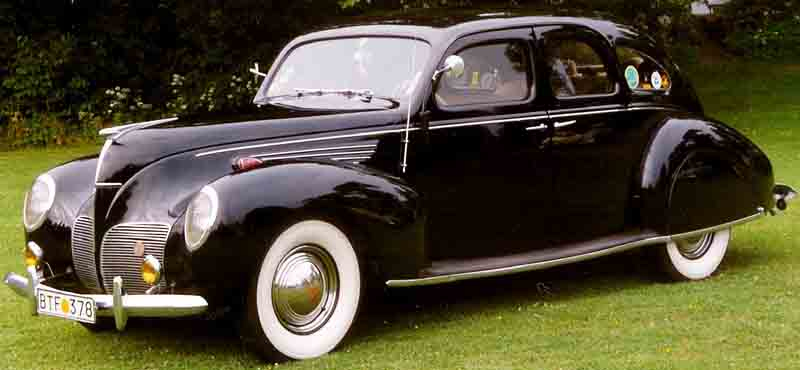
1938 Lincoln-Zephyr 4-door sedan

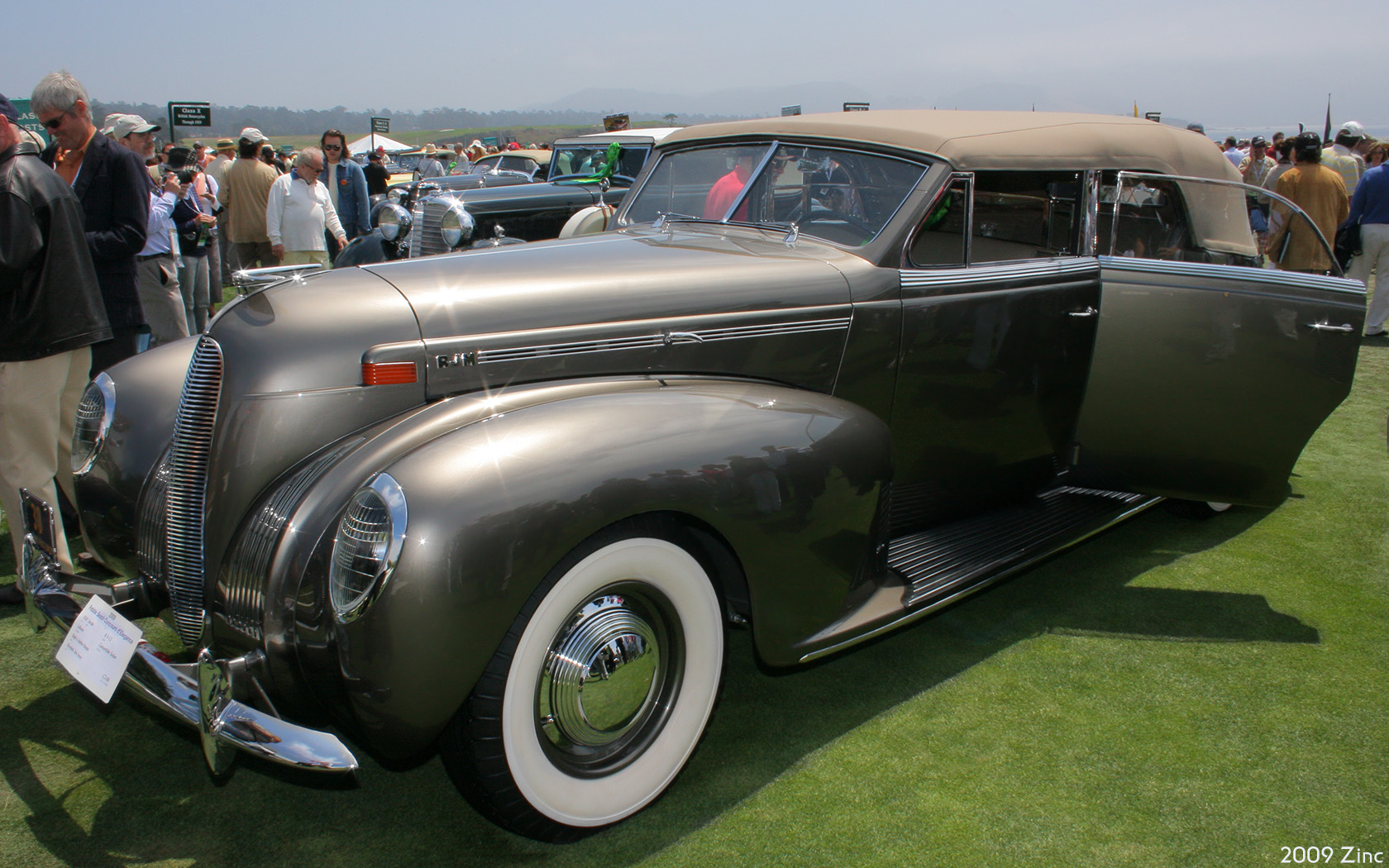
1938 Lincoln Model K Convertible Sedan (body by LeBaron)

==== Lincoln-Zephyr (1936) ====
During the 1930s, Lincoln expanded to two model lines for the first time. Coinciding with the shift in market position for the Model K, Edsel Ford introduced the Lincoln-Zephyr as a sub-marque within Lincoln for 1936. Designed as a competitor for the (Cadillac) LaSalle and Chrysler Airflow, the Lincoln-Zephyr was priced between Ford and the Model K.

The Lincoln-Zephyr was the first Ford Motor Company vehicle to use unibody construction; while designed with a prow-style front-fascia, the model line was sleeker than the Chrysler Airflow. In contrast to its competitors, the Lincoln-Zephyr was powered by a V12 engine (a design separate from the Model K).

The model line was a success in the marketplace, selling over 15,000 units in its first year, amounting to a nine-fold increase over the previous model year.

==== Lincoln Continental (1939) ====
In the late 1930s, Edsel Ford began to consider American cars too boxy. In late 1938, to develop a European-style ("Continental") car for his next Florida vacation, he commissioned Ford Chief Stylist E. T. Gregorie to design a unique body design, using a 1939 Lincoln Zephyr Convertible Coupe chassis. After sectioning the body 4 inches (102 mm), the running boards were deleted and a spare tire was mounted behind the trunk lid.

Upon his use of the one-off vehicle in Florida in 1939, Edsel Ford attracted a high amount of interest from potential buyers, often referring to its "European" or "Continental" exterior design. From the latter term, the one-off vehicle became known as the Lincoln Continental. For 1940 production, 404 vehicles were produced, with the first vehicle received by Mickey Rooney.

=== 1940s ===
Following the Great Depression, a number of American luxury car manufacturers were either forced into closure or reorganization; by 1940, alongside Lincoln, the American luxury-car segment largely consisted of Cadillac (who ended production of the LaSalle and V16 in 1940), the Chrysler Imperial (reduced to 8-passenger sedans and limousines), and Packard. To further secure the future for Lincoln, on April 30, 1940, Ford Motor Company reorganized Lincoln Motor Company as the Lincoln Division of Ford Motor Company. While previously operating as an autonomous entity, as a division, Lincoln structurally became similar to its major competitor Cadillac (within General Motors).

As part of the change, several changes were made to the Lincoln model line. Following the positive feedback of the 1939 Lincoln Continental one-off convertible built for Edsel Ford, the Lincoln Continental was introduced as a Lincoln-Zephyr production model for 1940. For 1941, Lincoln revised its branding; the hyphen was removed from Lincoln-Zephyr, making it a Lincoln. As a replacement for the expensive Model K, an extended-wheelbase Lincoln Custom variant of the Lincoln Zephyr was developed. Following the development of proper tooling, the Lincoln Continental began production on the assembly line, replacing hand-built construction.

After the entry of the United States into World War II, as with all U.S. auto manufacturers, Lincoln ended automobile production as Ford Motor Company concentrated on wartime manufacturing. Following the conclusion of the war in 1945, the structure of Lincoln within Ford changed again, as the Lincoln-Mercury Division was created, pairing Mercury and Lincoln together; from 1945 to the 2010 closure of Mercury, the two divisions were paired together within Ford.

For 1946, Lincoln returned to production, ending the use of the Zephyr name. Code-named the H-series, non-Continental Lincolns were identified by their body style. Using slightly updated exteriors from 1942, the 1946 Lincolns continued the use of the Zephyr chassis. 1948 marked the final year of the Zephyr chassis (dating to 1936) and (as of 2023) the use of a V12 engine in an American mass-produced automobile. After 5,322 were produced (as both a Lincoln-Zephyr and Lincoln), Lincoln ended production of the Continental.

For 1949, all three Ford Motor Company divisions debuted their first postwar designs. Sharing its body structure with the Mercury Eight, the redesigned Lincoln model line (code-named the EL-series) marked the first use of a V8 in a Lincoln since 1932. An all-new V12 intended for Lincoln was stillborn in development, leading the division to adapt a Ford flathead V8 (from the Ford F-8 conventional truck). As with the previous Lincoln Continental, the 1949 Lincoln dispensed with running boards completely, moving on to abandon pontoon styling entirely, with a straight fender line (and low hood line) from headlamp to taillamp. In a carryover from Zephyr-based Lincolns, the 1949 Lincolns retained rear-hinged passenger doors. As a flagship model of Lincoln, the Lincoln Cosmopolitan was styled with its own rear roofline.

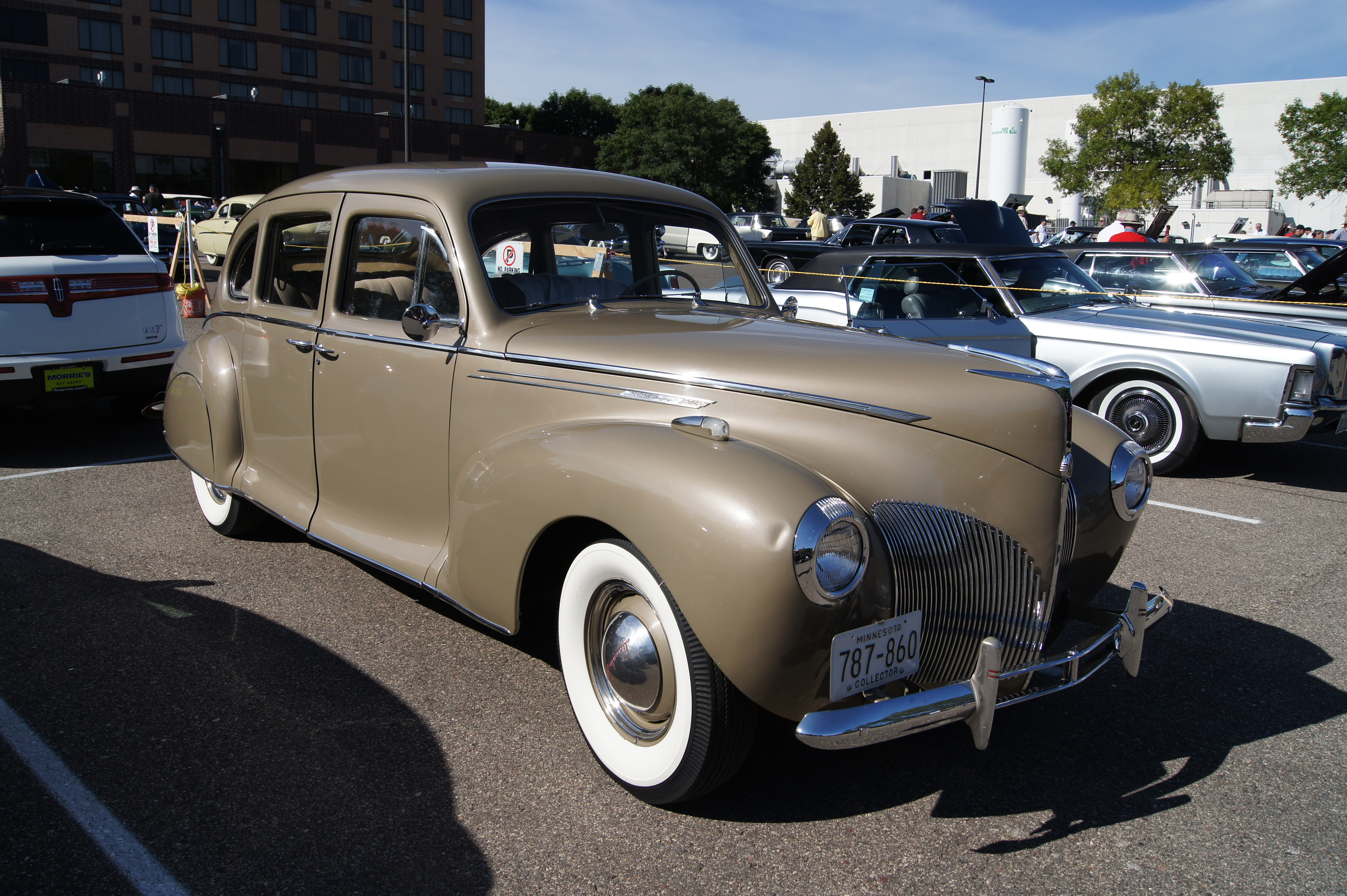
1940 Lincoln Zephyr

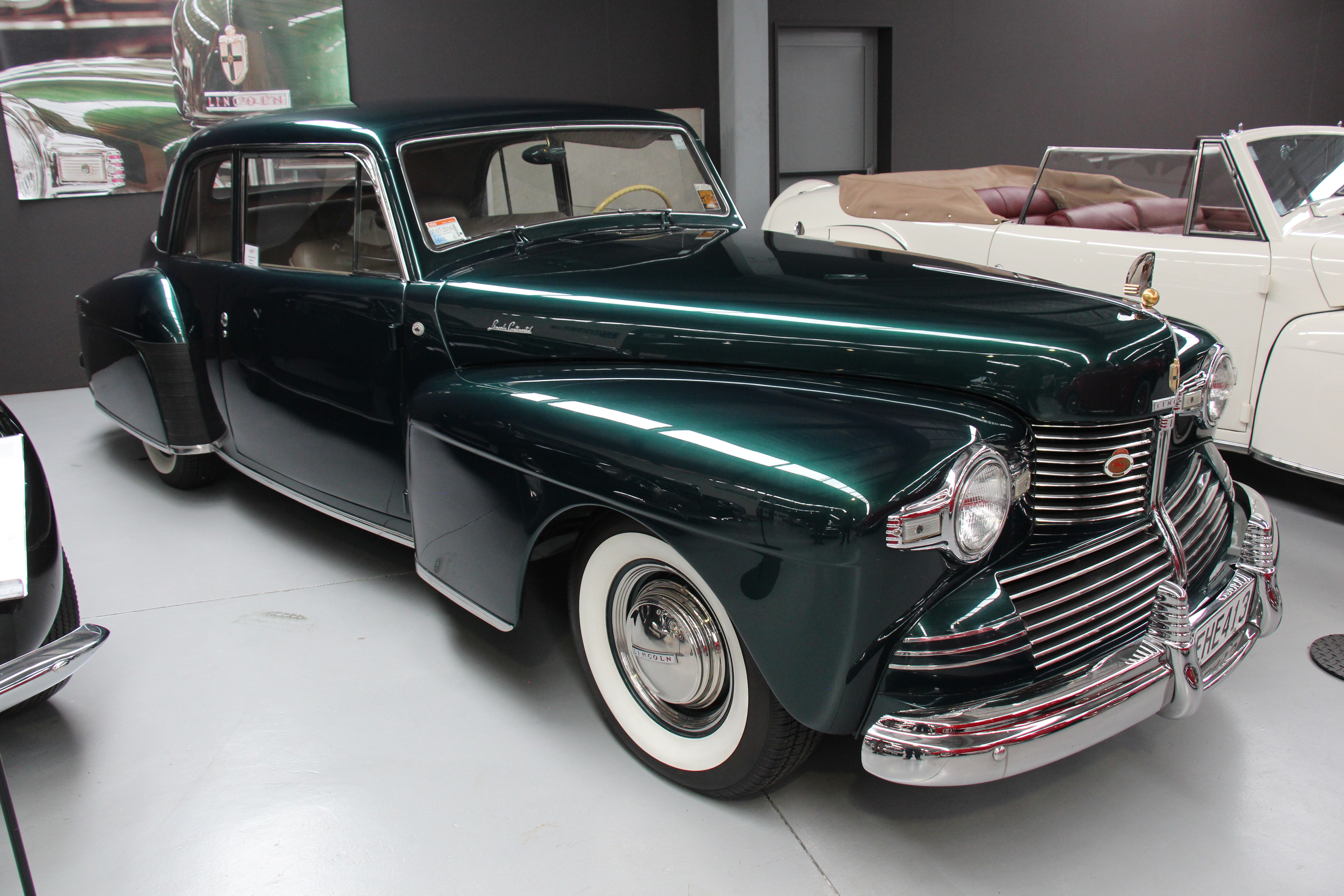
1942 Lincoln Continental coupe

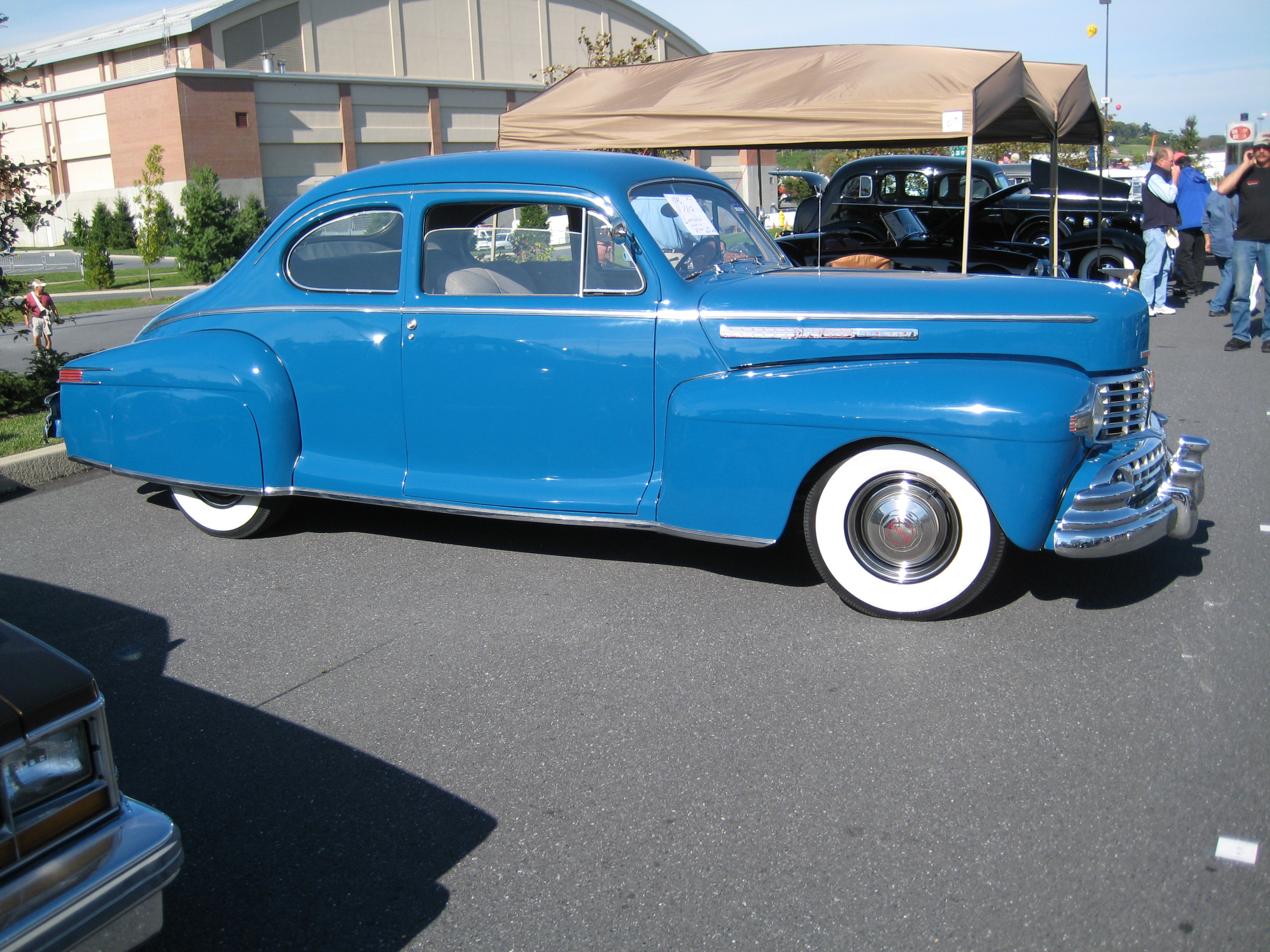
1946 Lincoln (coupe)

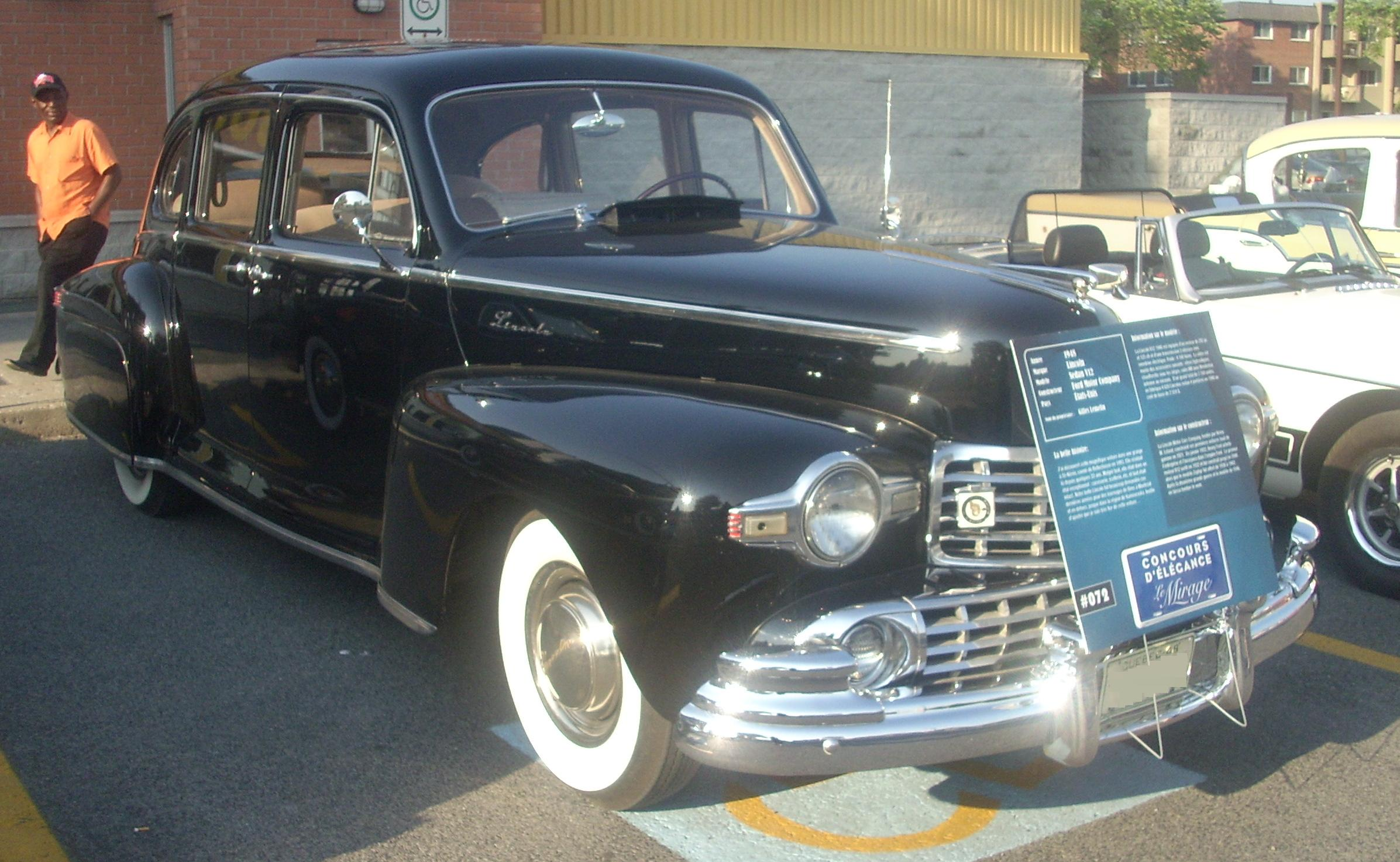
1948 Lincoln (sedan)
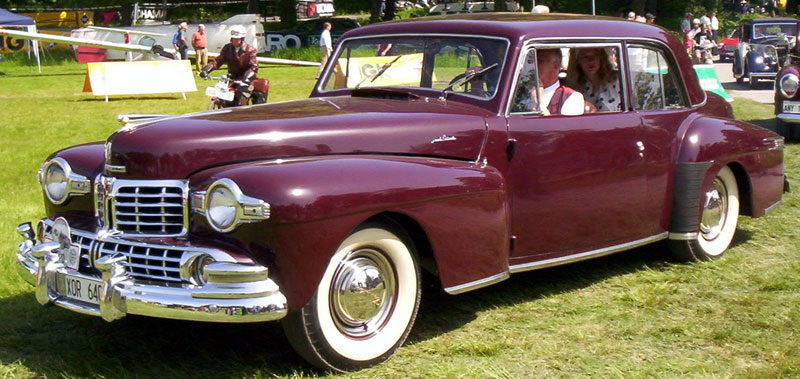
1948 Lincoln Continental

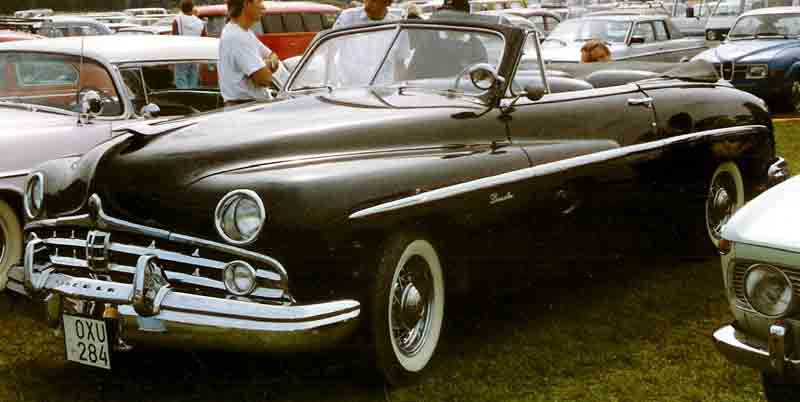
1949 Lincoln (convertible)

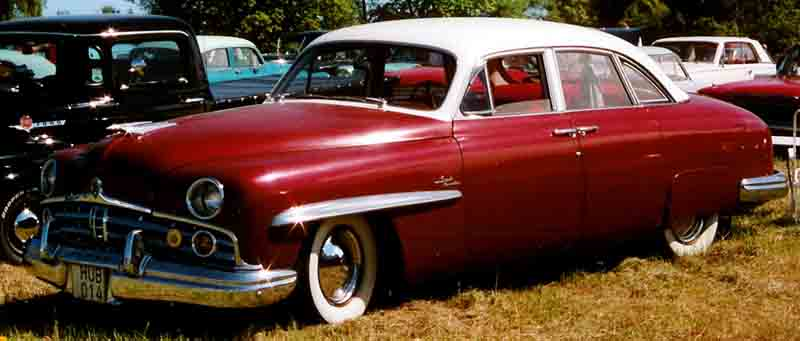
1949 Lincoln Cosmopolitan

=== 1950s ===
As Lincoln entered the 1950s, Ford Motor Company sought to increase the differentiation between the Mercury and Lincoln model lines. For 1952, to add interest to the brand, Lincoln returned to model names for the first time since 1942, with the Lincoln Cosmopolitan becoming the standard Lincoln model, with the Lincoln Capri becoming the flagship model line. In a return to (small) pontoon rear fenders, Lincolns shared a body with the Mercury Monterey. Mechanically, Lincoln differed from Mercury, as the Ford truck V8 was replaced by the Lincoln Y-block V8 with a Hydramatic transmission. For the first time since the discontinuation of the Model K, Lincolns were produced with front-hinged rear doors.

For 1956, the shared Lincoln-Mercury body underwent a redesign for the final time, with Lincoln adopting elements from the Mercury XM-800 and Lincoln Futura concept cars. Slotted above the Lincoln Capri, the Lincoln Premiere adapted features of the Continental Mark II, including its ducted air conditioning.

During 1956, Lincoln-Mercury was reorganized slightly, following the creation of the free-standing Edsel and Continental divisions, Lincoln-Mercury was changed to Mercury-Edsel-Lincoln (MEL), with Edsel slotted alongside/below Mercury and Continental above Lincoln, as the flagship of all of Ford Motor Company. By the end of 1959, Continental was integrated into Lincoln, and Edsel was withdrawn.

The Lincoln Motor Company Plant, built in Detroit, Michigan, by Henry Leland in 1917, was closed after 1952; subsequent Lincolns were produced alongside Mercury Montereys and Mercury Montclairs. For the 1957 model year, Ford opened Wixom Assembly in Wixom, Michigan, as a facility to specialize in Lincoln production. From 1957 until 2007, the facility produced Lincoln vehicles nearly exclusively, along with the Ford GT and several generations of the Ford Thunderbird.

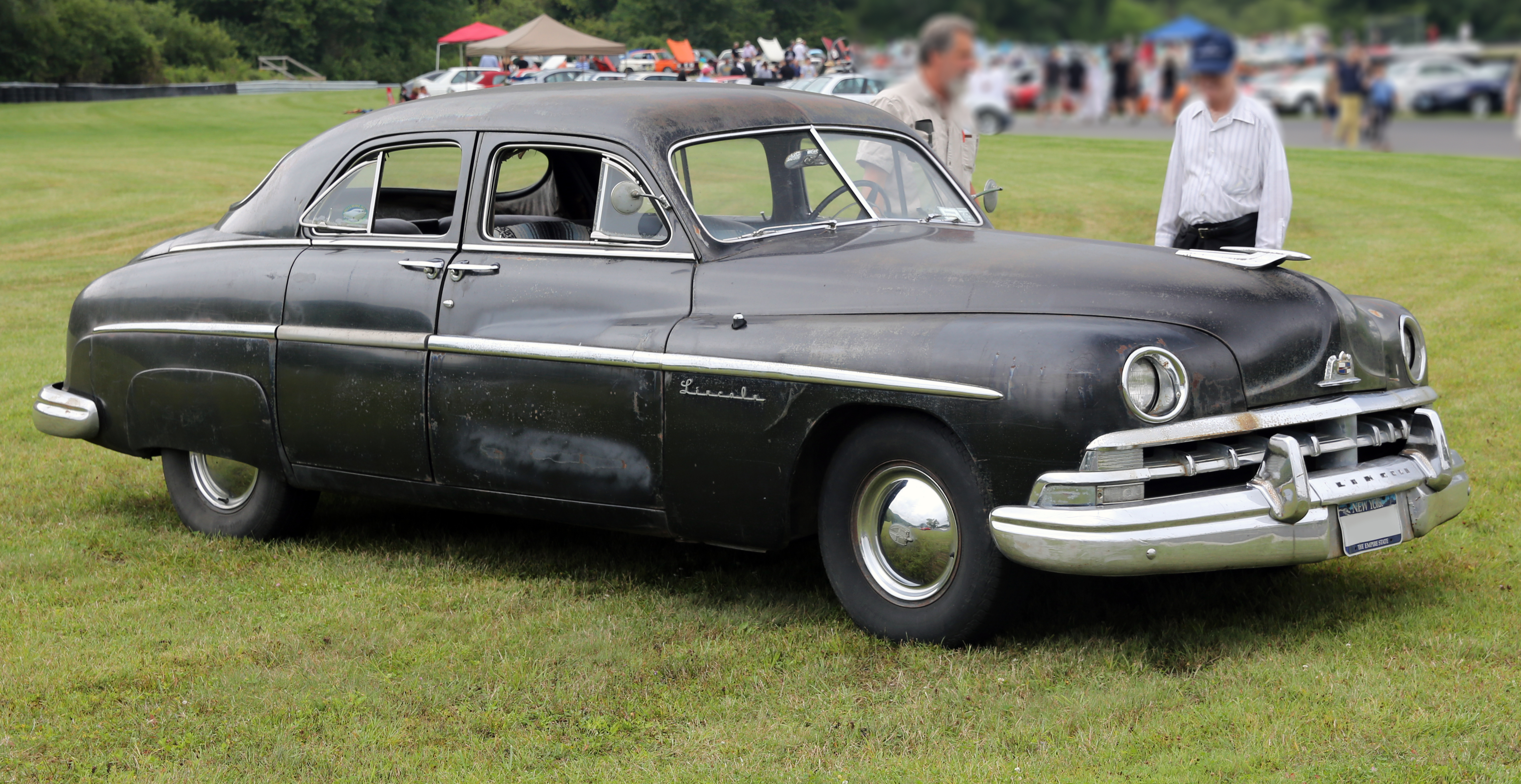
1950 Lincoln (sedan)

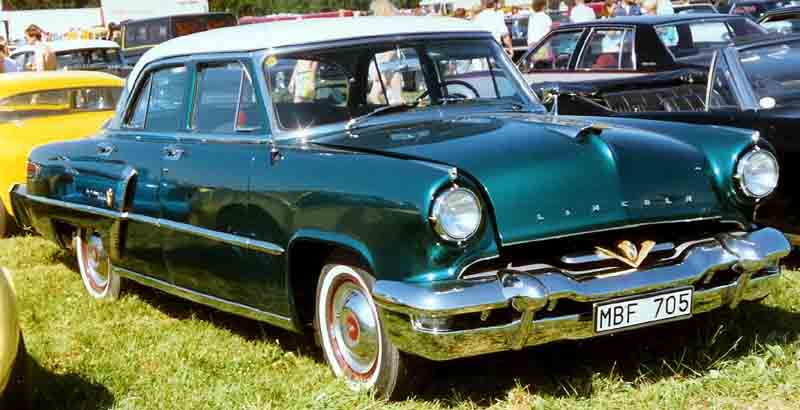
1953 Lincoln Capri

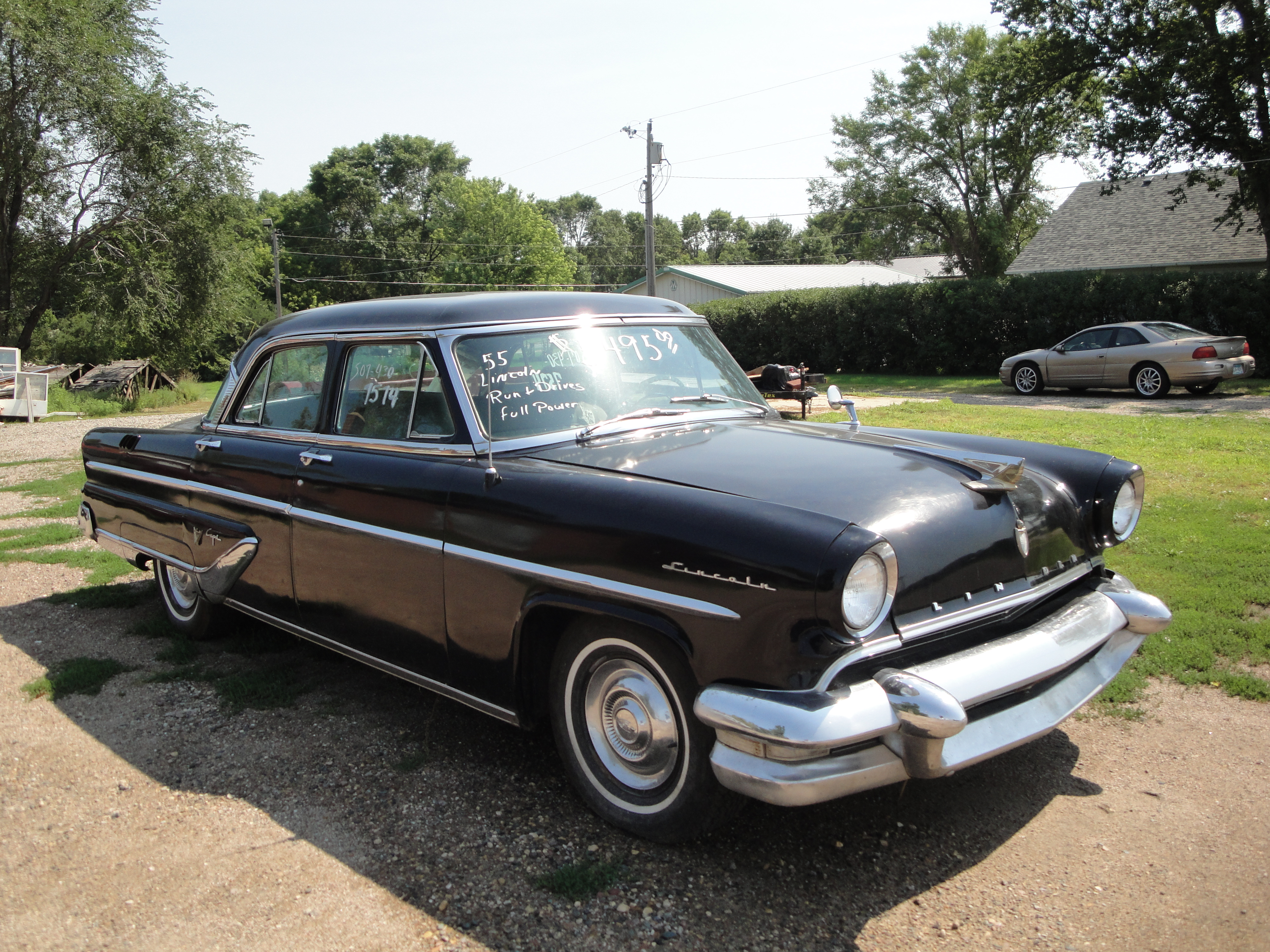
1955 Lincoln Capri

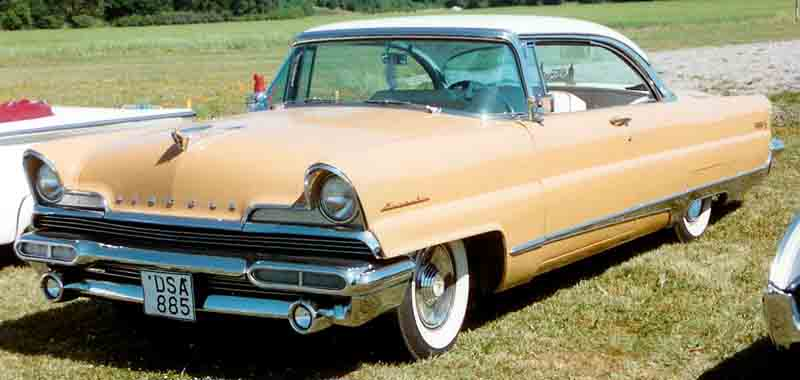
1956 Lincoln Premiere

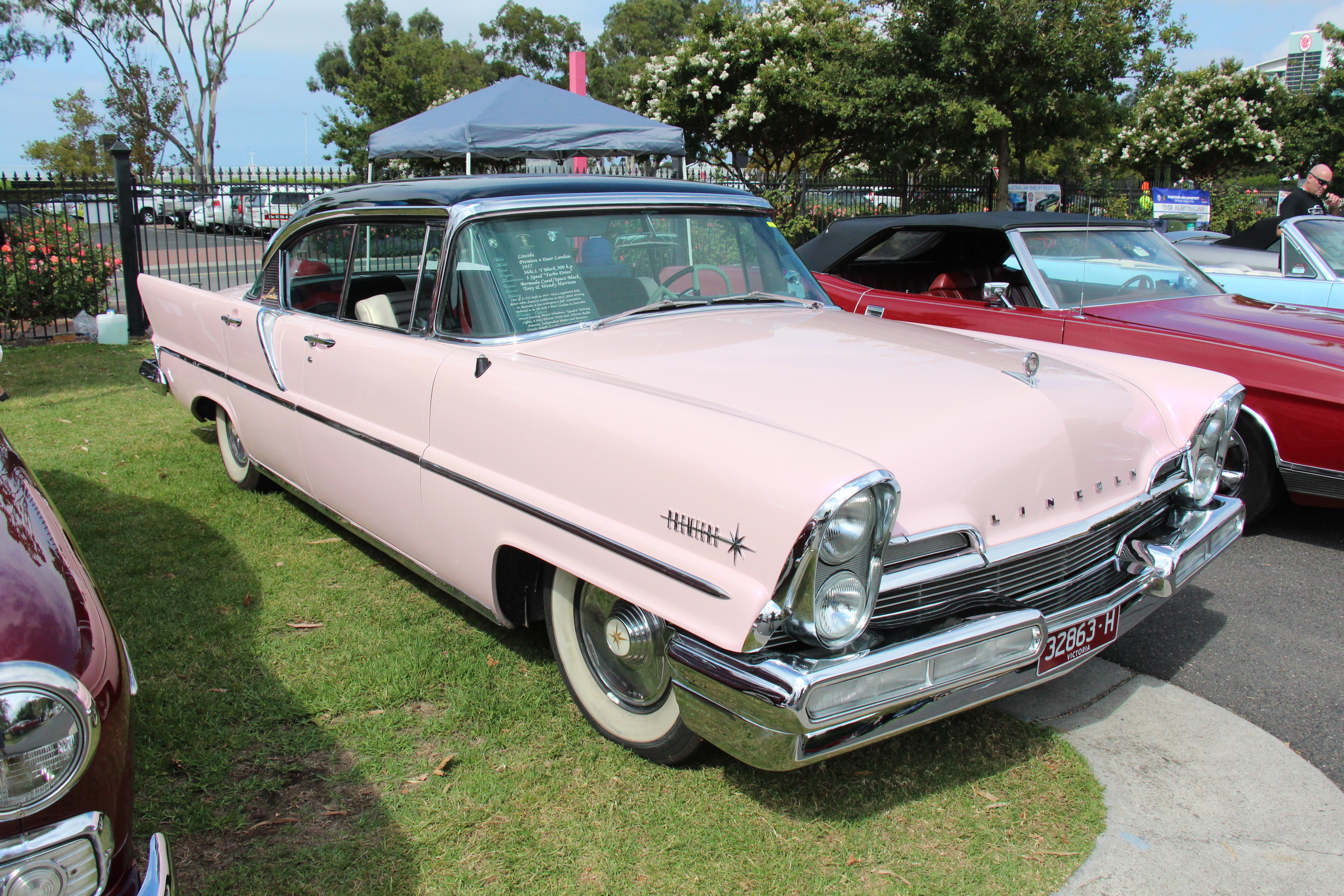
1957 Lincoln Premiere Landau (4-door hardtop)

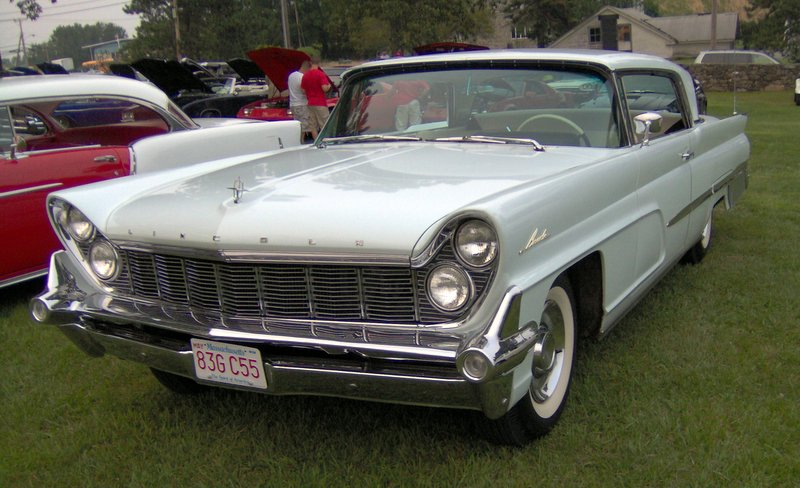
1959 Lincoln Premiere

==== Continental Division (1956–1959) ====
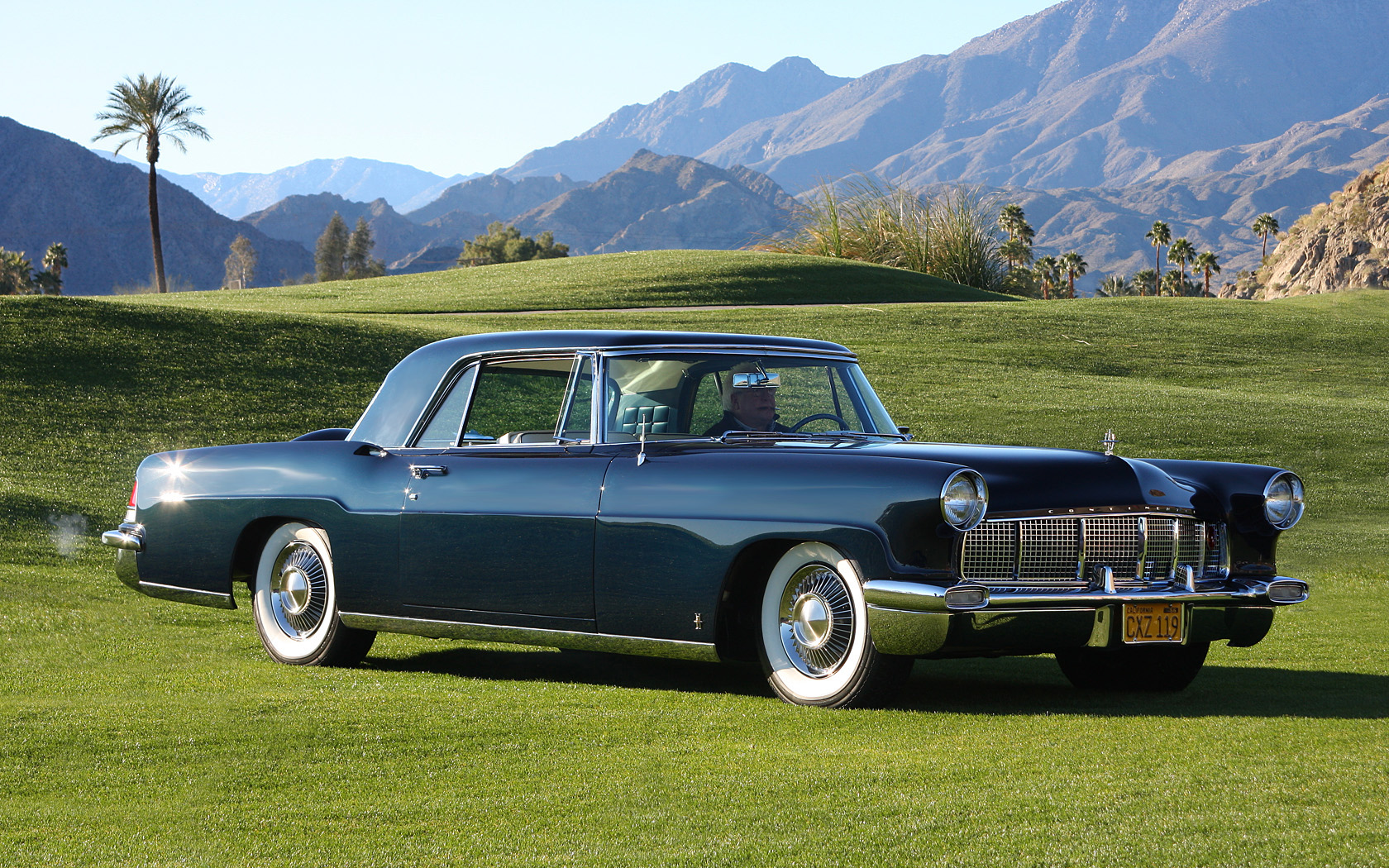
1956 Continental Mark II

For the 1956 model year, Ford Motor Company created the Continental Division, slotted above Lincoln as the flagship marque of Ford Motor Company. At its launch, Continental introduced the Continental Mark II as its model line, intended as a successor to the 1940–1948 Lincoln Continental personal luxury car. Offered as a two-door hardtop coupe, the Mark II broke from a number of American styling precedents of the time. While fitted with whitewall tires, the exterior was fitted with minimal chrome trim on the body sides; tailfins were left off of the body completely. In place of the bumper-mounted spare tire of the original Lincoln Continental, the trunk lid of the Mark II showcased the design element, with a large imitation spare tire bulge (which fit over the actual spare tire inside the trunk). The Mark II was largely hand-built, with extensive quality testing done on each engine and transmission before leaving the factory.

In place of establishing a separate sales and service network for Continental, the Mark II was marketed through Lincoln (the Mark II used a Lincoln engine and transmission). At $10,000 (equivalent to $118,400 in 2025), the Mark II was the most expensive car produced by an American automaker at the time, rivaling the Rolls-Royce Silver Cloud in price.

On July 18, 1956, the Continental Division was integrated into Lincoln which continued to manage the Continental brand as a separate marque. During the 1957 model year, the Mark II was withdrawn, largely as a consequence of its hand-built construction; each unit was sold at a loss of over $1,000 (equivalent to $11,800 in 2025). Subsequently, the 1957 Cadillac Eldorado Brougham overtook the Mark II as the most expensive American-produced vehicle.

For 1958, as part of a mandated $4,000 (equivalent to $44,600 in 2025) reduction in price, Continental adopted the body of Lincoln, expanding into multiple body styles for the Mark III (the nomenclature indicating the transition). Adding a feature of the Mercury Turnpike Cruiser, Continental adopted a retractable rear window across every body style (including convertibles) with a reverse-slant rear roofline. For 1959, the Mark III was renamed the Mark IV, becoming the Mark V for 1960.

In 1959, the Continental marque was formally brought to an end within Lincoln; for 1960, the Mark V was brought to production as the Lincoln Continental Mark V, ending the model cycle alongside the standard Lincoln model line.

==== Unibody vehicles ====
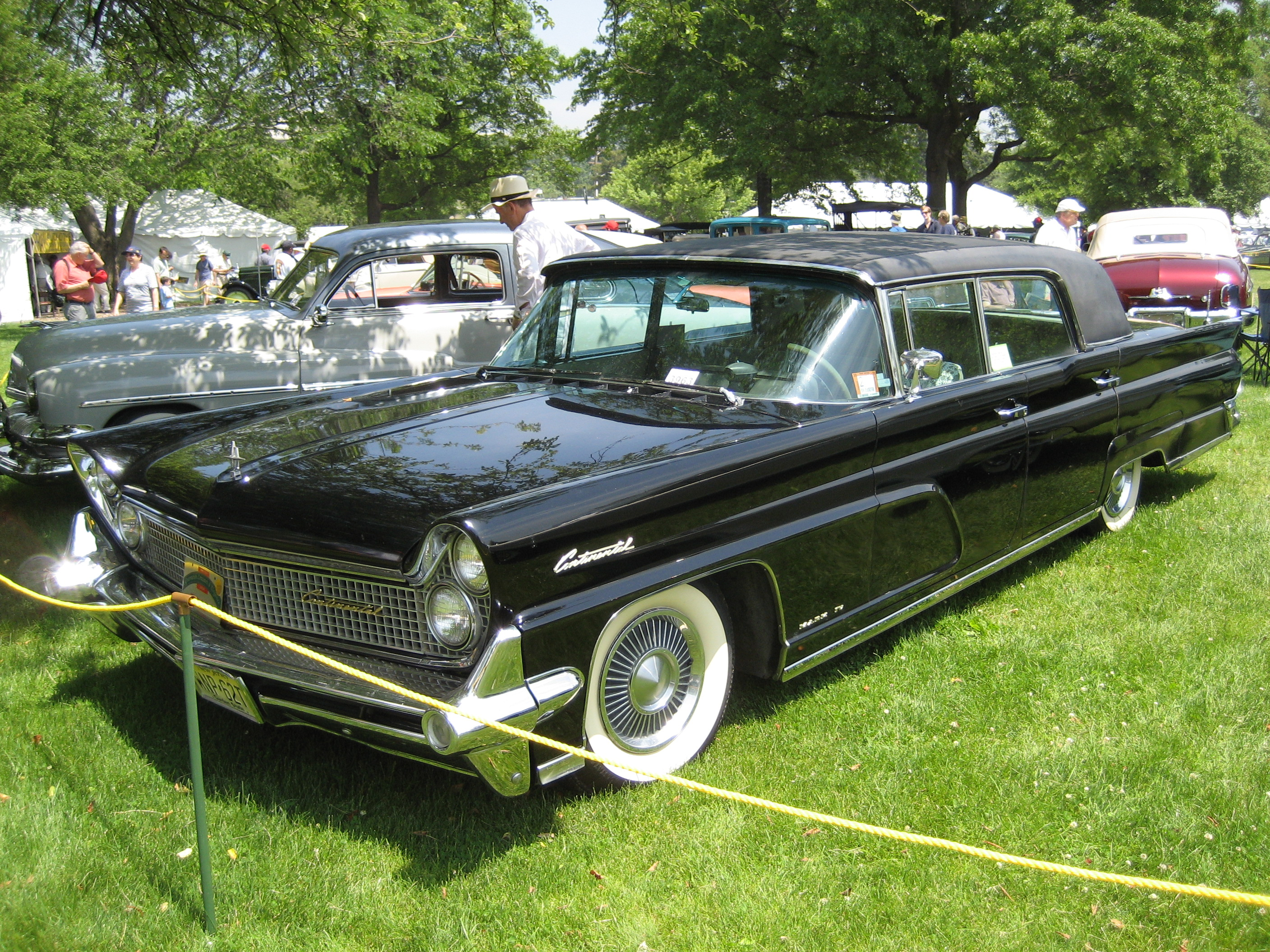
1959 Continental Mark IV Town Car formal-roof sedan

For the 1958 model year, the Mercury-Edsel-Lincoln (M-E-L) division adapted new bodies across its vehicle lines. In addition to Mercury sharing its bodies with the premium Edsels (prior to the latter's demise), Lincoln and Continental adopted a common body structure, shifting to unibody construction. With a 131-inch wheelbase, the new platform would be among the largest vehicles ever built by Ford Motor Company; they are the longest Lincolns ever built without 5 mph bumpers, a regulatory mandate which went into effect in September 1972.

As a replacement for the Y-block V8, Ford developed a 430 cu in (7.0 L) "MEL" V8 as standard equipment for Lincolns (which was also available in Ford Thunderbirds and some Mercury vehicles).

For 1959, Continental developed Town Car and Limousine variants of the standard four-door sedan. In place of extending the wheelbase, the reverse-slant roofline was replaced by a formal notchback configuration, allowing the rear seat to be moved rearward several inches. Among the rarest Lincoln vehicles ever produced, the Town Car and Limousines were only offered painted in black.

=== 1960s ===
From 1958 until 1960, Lincoln would lose over $60,000,000 (equivalent to $650,000,000 in 2025). Following the recession economy of the late 1950s (a factor that would play into the demise of Edsel), Ford Motor Company was forced to recoup the development costs of a vehicle platform that Lincoln shared with neither Ford nor Mercury (with the lone exception of the engine and transmission). By 1958, the future of Lincoln-Mercury was at risk, with Ford President Robert McNamara considering the reduction of Ford to its namesake brand. As a condition of allowing Lincoln to continue production, McNamara required the Lincoln model line to undergo a reduction in size.

For 1961, Lincoln consolidated its model lineup to a single model line, with the Lincoln Continental replacing the Lincoln Capri and Lincoln Premiere; as the Continental marque was withdrawn, the Mark V saw no successor. While only nominally lighter than the 1960 Lincoln, the 1961 Lincoln Continental adopted a smaller exterior footprint, shedding 15 inches in length and 8 inches of wheelbase. In an effort to streamline production, only four-door body styles were produced, with the Continental becoming the sole mass-produced four-door convertible sold in North America; to maximize rear-seat egress, Lincoln returned to the use of rear suicide doors.

In another requirement to ensure its survival, the model cycle of Lincoln was extended from three years to nine years. While largely dispensing with major yearly model changes, the decision established design consistency and shifting resources towards quality control. For the 1966 model year, to better compete with the Cadillac Coupe de Ville and the Imperial Crown/LeBaron Coupe, Lincoln added a two-door hardtop to the Continental model line. After the 1967 model year, Lincoln ended production of the Continental 4-door convertible. At 5,712 pounds, the 1967 Lincoln Continental Convertible is the heaviest non-limousine car ever produced by Ford Motor Company; as of 2023, it is the final factory-produced four-door convertible sold in North America.

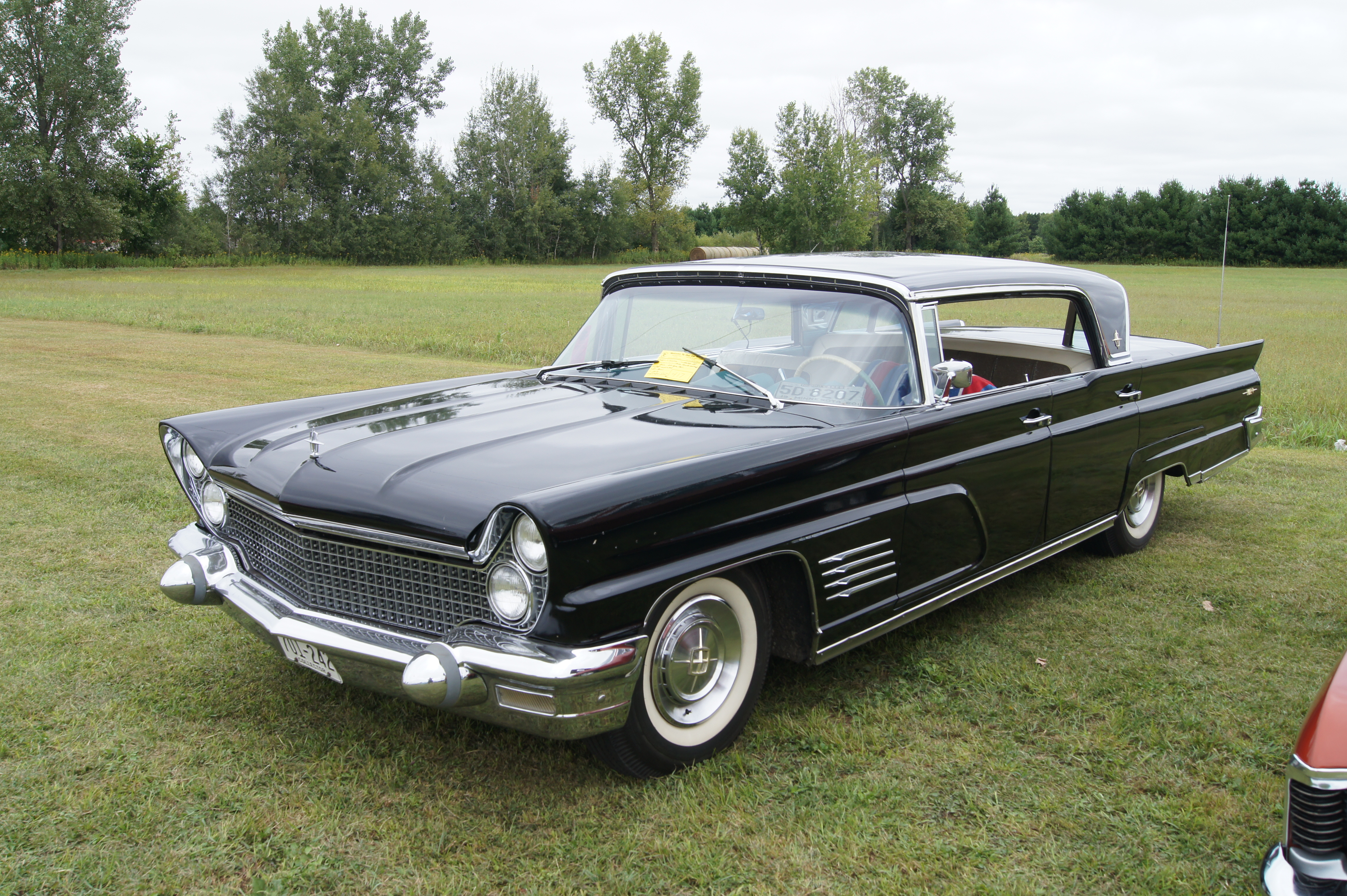
1960 Lincoln Continental Mark V hardtop sedan

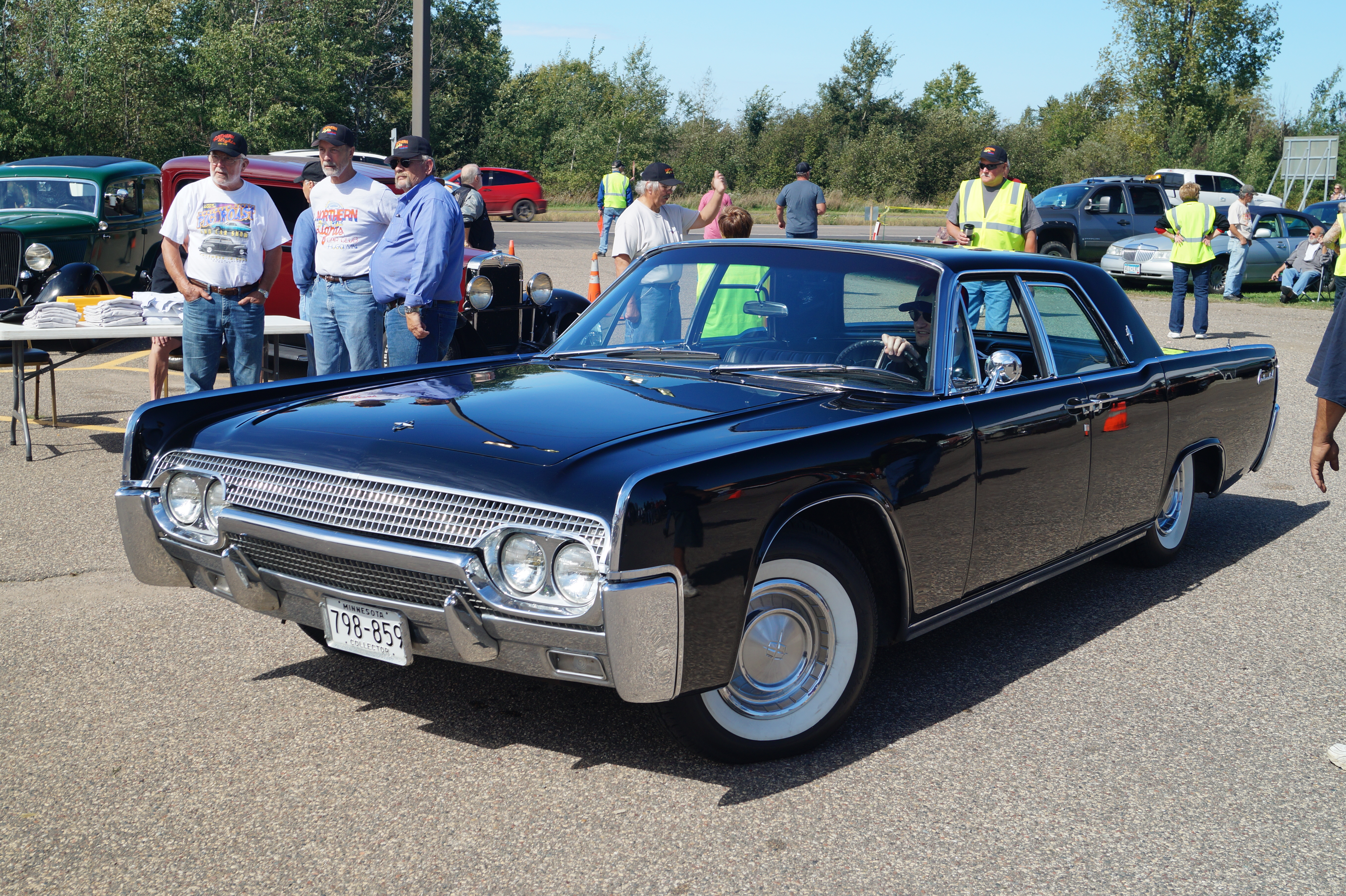
1961 Lincoln Continental sedan

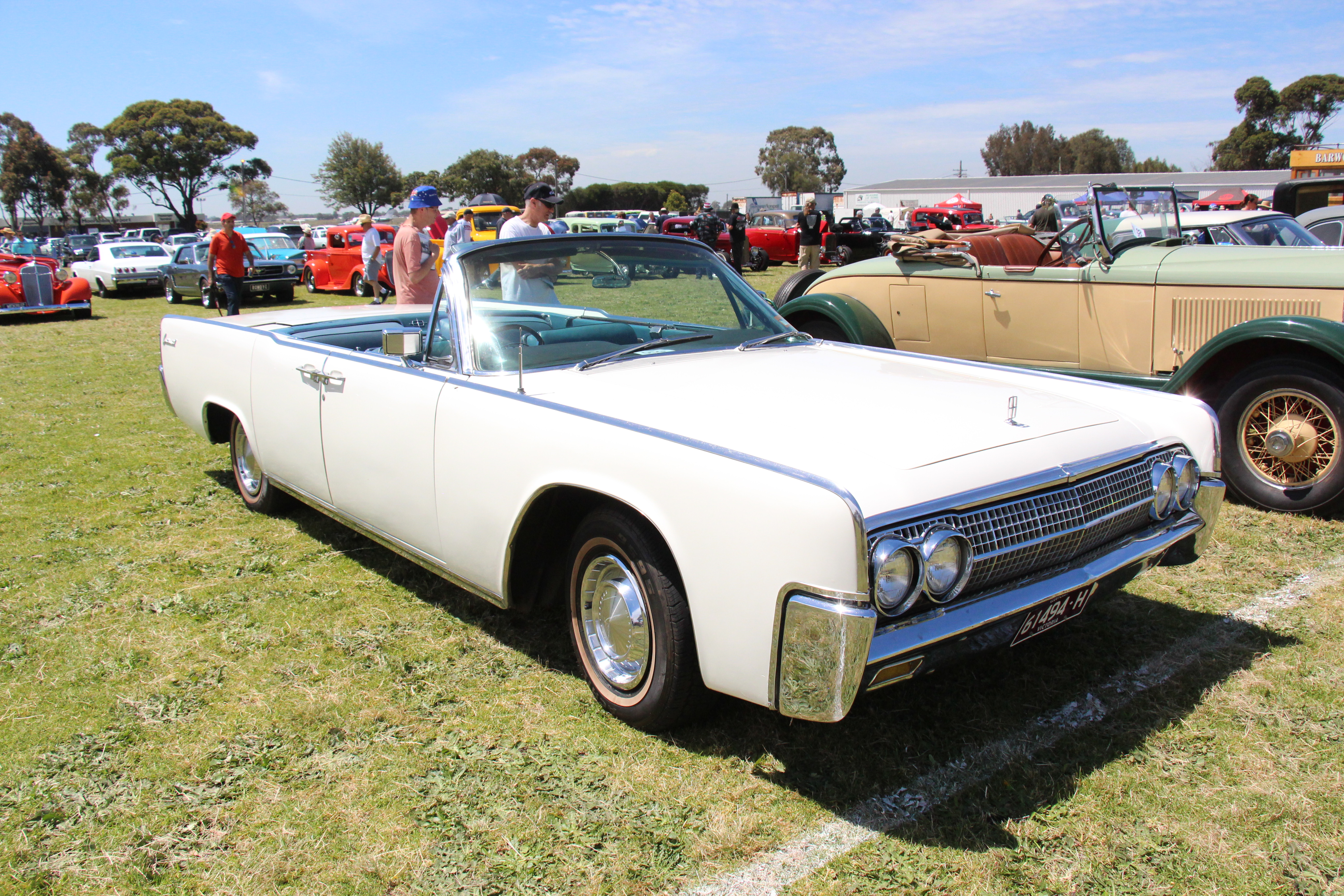
1963 Lincoln Continental convertible

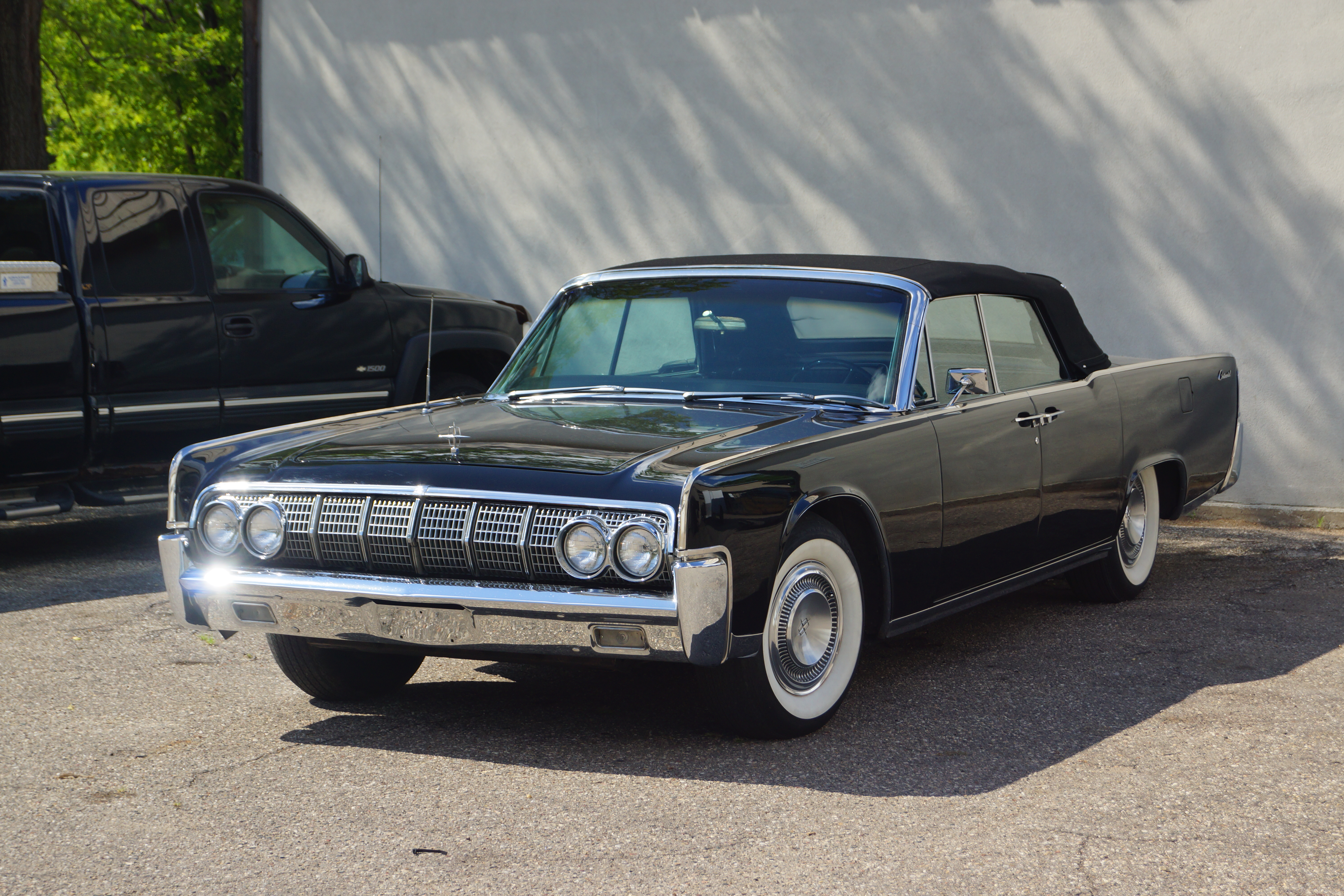
1964 Lincoln Continental convertible (top raised)

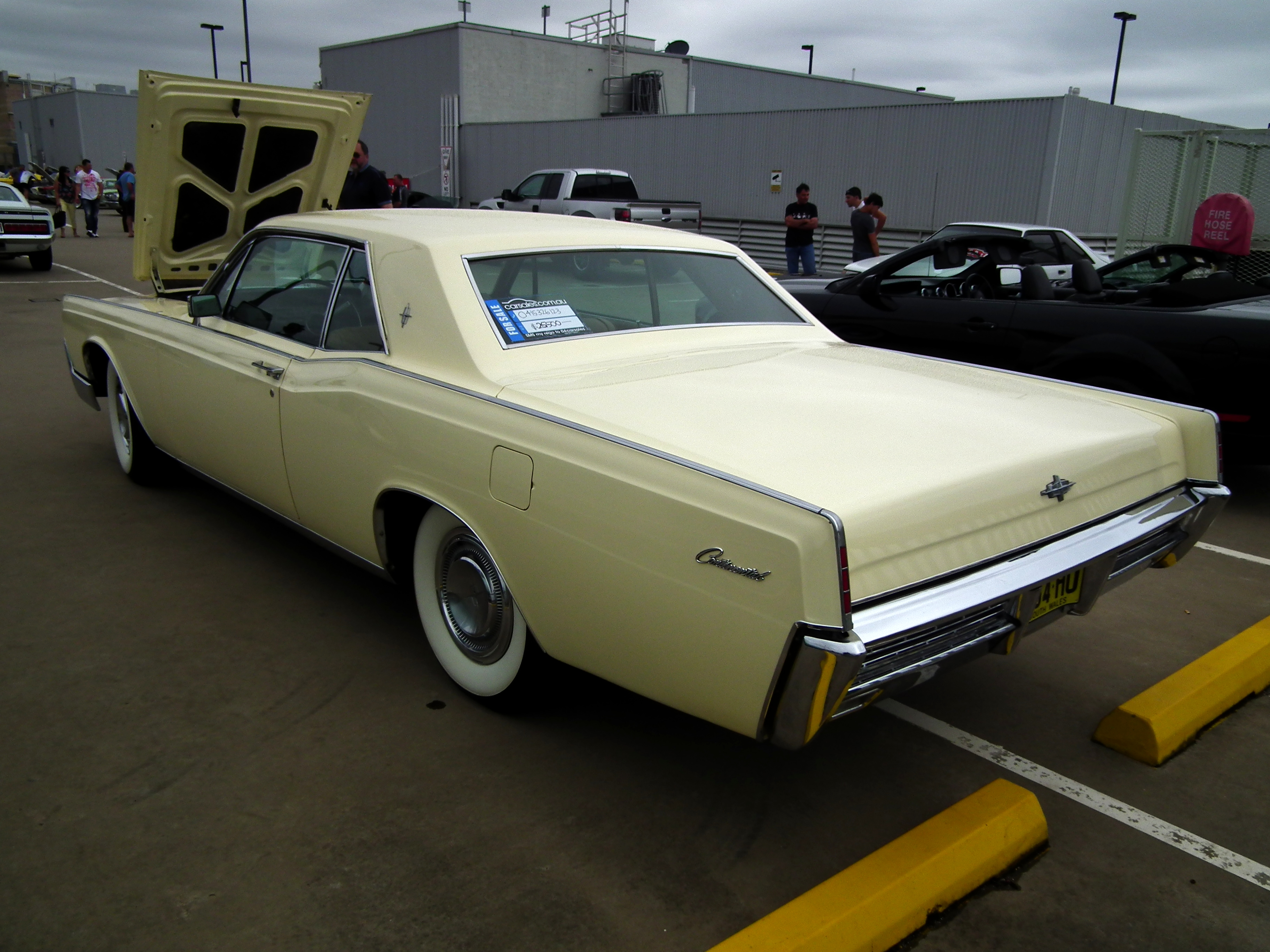
1967 Lincoln Continental coupe

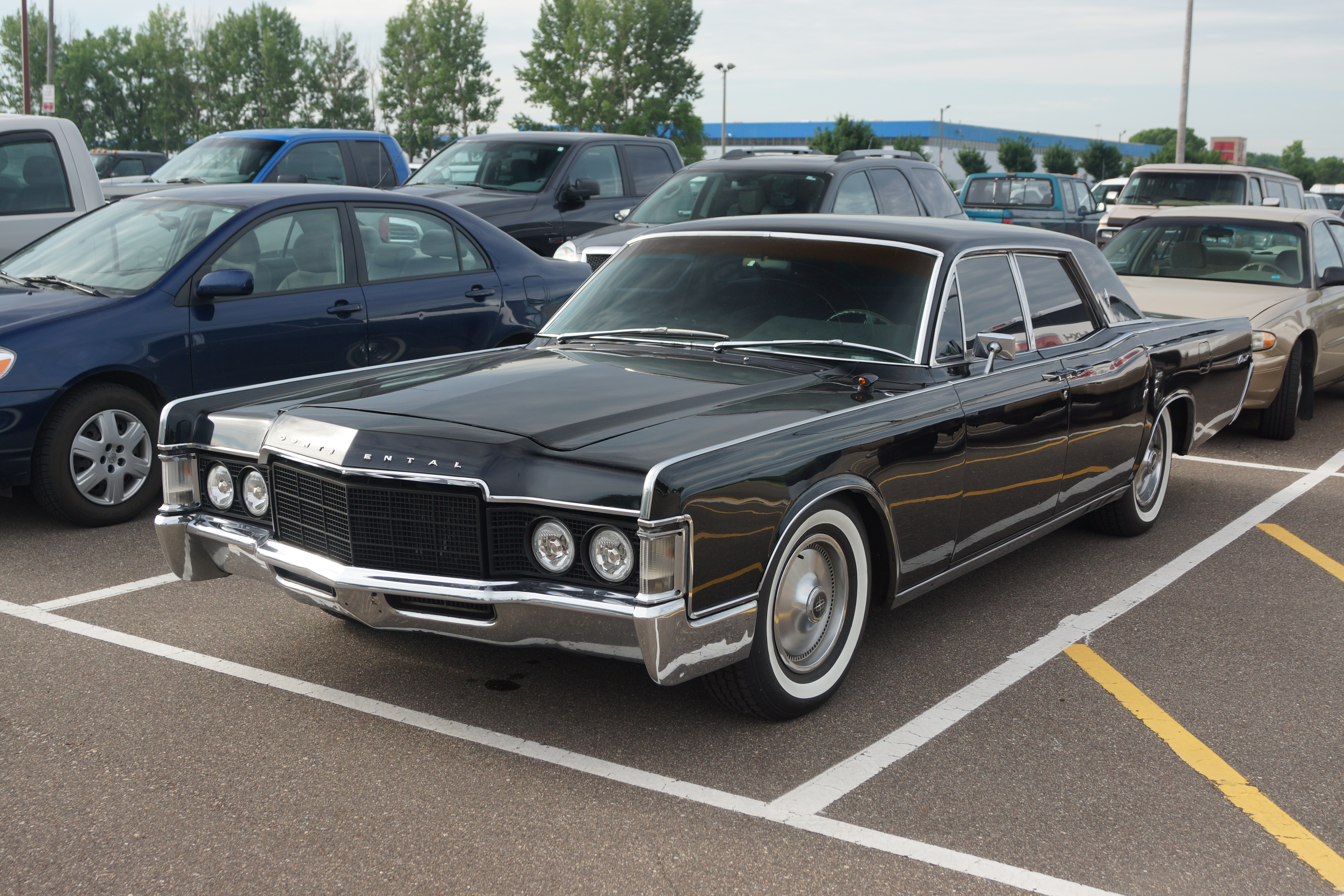
1969 Lincoln Continental sedan

==== Continental Mark III ====
During the 1960s, Ford sought to develop a new flagship vehicle as a successor to the Continental Mark II. While the Lincoln Continental served as a close competitor to the Cadillac de Ville series and the Imperial, while Cadillac shifted the Cadillac Eldorado to the personal luxury segment in 1967, a segment that Ford exited in 1957 after the withdrawal of the Continental Mark II. As a response, in April 1968, the Continental Mark III was released as a 1969 model. While not officially a Lincoln, the Continental Mark III was marketed and serviced through the Lincoln-Mercury dealer network. Over a number of various names considered for the vehicle, Continental Mark III was chosen, as Henry Ford II thought the Continental Mark II did not have a proper successor (thus restarting the nomenclature).

Alongside the 1968 Lincoln Continental, the Continental Mark III marked the debut of the 460 cu in (7.5 L) Ford 385-series V8 rated at 365 hp (272 kW; 370 PS) and 500 lb⋅ft (678 N⋅m) torque and also became the first Ford vehicle to be fitted with anti-lock brakes. As standard equipment, the Mark III was fitted with power door locks, power seats, and power windows. To control development and production costs, the Mark III was offered only as a two-door hardtop derived from the chassis underpinnings of the four-door Ford Thunderbird. While sharing many styling elements from Lincoln, the Continental Mark III debuted many elements of its own, including hidden headlights and a redesigned trunk lid with a simulated spare-tire indentation (the actual spare tire laid flat in the front part of the trunk). It mixed European and American luxury features with the most prominent being an upright chrome grille inspired by a Rolls-Royce design and had a centrally mounted Cartier electric clock on the dashboard.

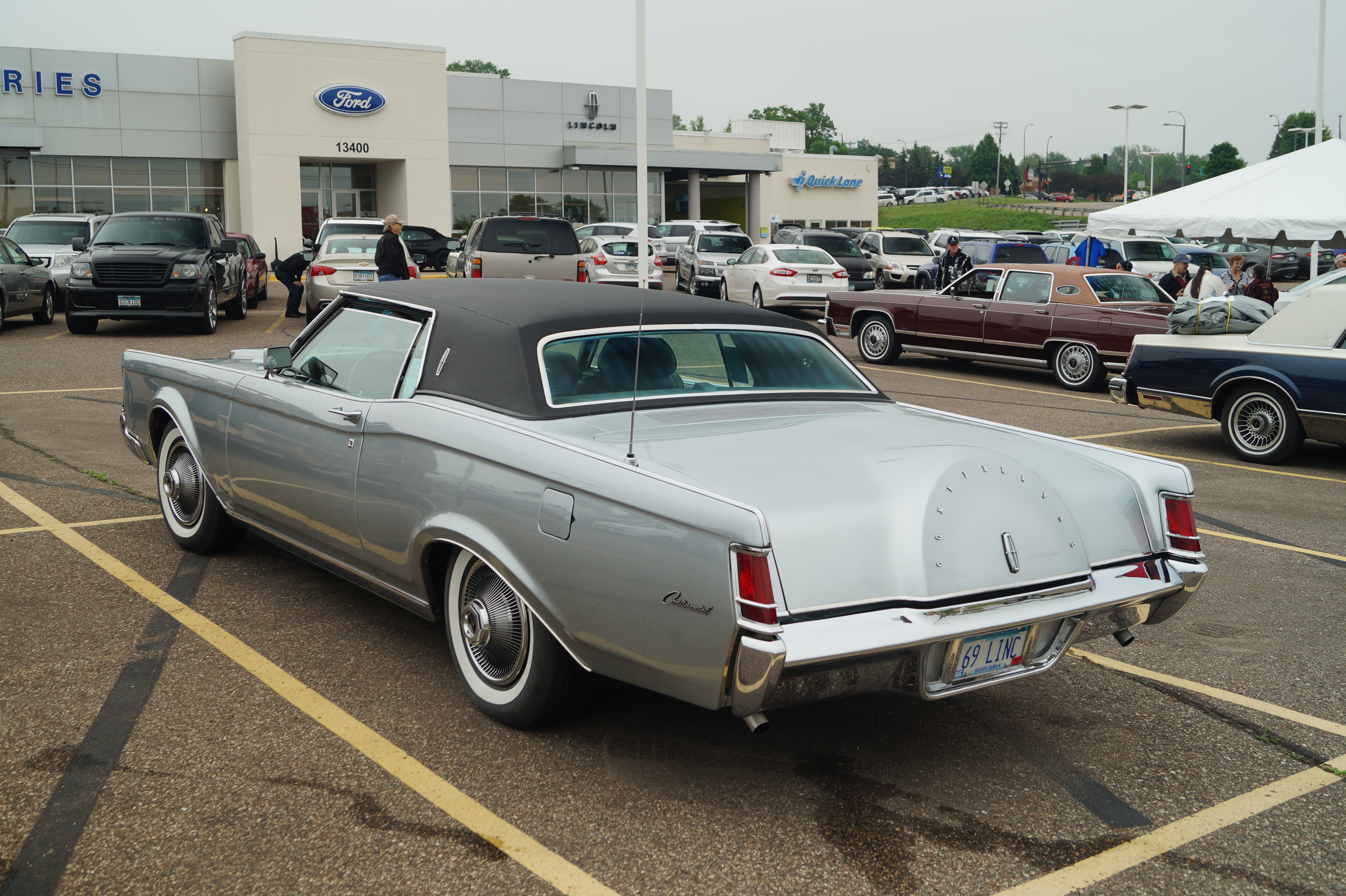
1969 Continental Mark III rear

=== 1970s ===
While the Continental Mark III would bring Lincoln into the decade on a high note, for the American luxury car segment, the 1970s would prove tumultuous. Along with the introduction of federal safety regulations for American-market automobiles (which brought features such as 5-mph bumpers and the end of hardtop body styles), the 1973 fuel crisis would play a significant role in the engineering of American automobiles, forcing Lincoln to develop a compact-size sedan and redesign smaller full-size sedans for the 1980s. As Chrysler withdrew its Imperial brand after 1975, Cadillac became the sole domestic competitor of Lincoln.

For the 1970 model year, Lincoln made good on its 1958 plan to commit to a nine-year design cycle, giving the Continental its first complete redesign for the first time since 1961. During the 1960s, while sales of the Continental had remained relatively steady throughout its production, the engineering of luxury cars had begun to change among its competitors; to increase design commonality (and lower production costs), Cadillac and Imperial shifted away from brand-specific platforms (with the latter adapting to shared bodyshells with Chrysler). For the redesign of the Lincoln model line, the Continental grew in size. While sharing no visible body panels, Lincoln adapted the chassis of the Ford LTD/Mercury Marquis (shifting to body-on-frame construction for the first time since 1957). In another effort to maintain design consistency, the 1970 Continental was produced through 1979 with only gradual updates. Along with the mandated addition of 5-mph bumpers, in 1975, the roofline was redesigned (to visually differentiate the Continental from the Mercury Marquis).

The 1970s saw the introduction of several naming traditions within Lincoln. For 1970, the Town Car nameplate was revived on a permanent basis as a submodel of the Lincoln Continental. Following the use of a Cartier-brand clock on the Continental Mark III, in 1976, the Continental Mark IV began the use of Designer Editions, which saw use on subsequent Continental Mark series models and Lincolns.

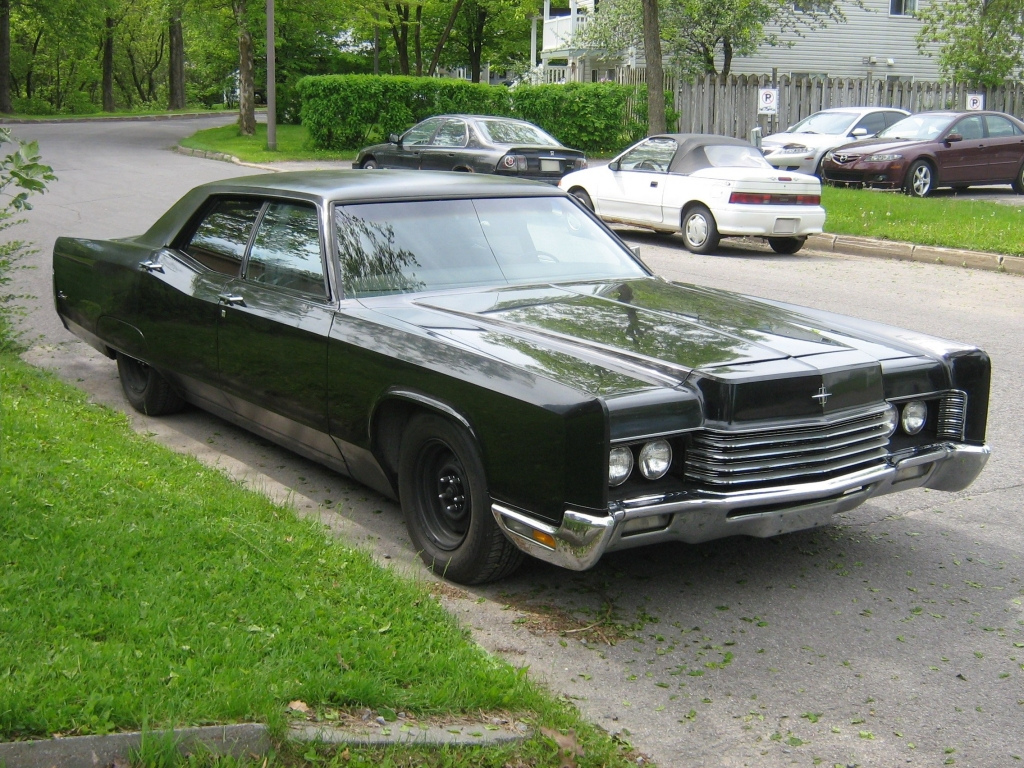
1970 Lincoln Continental

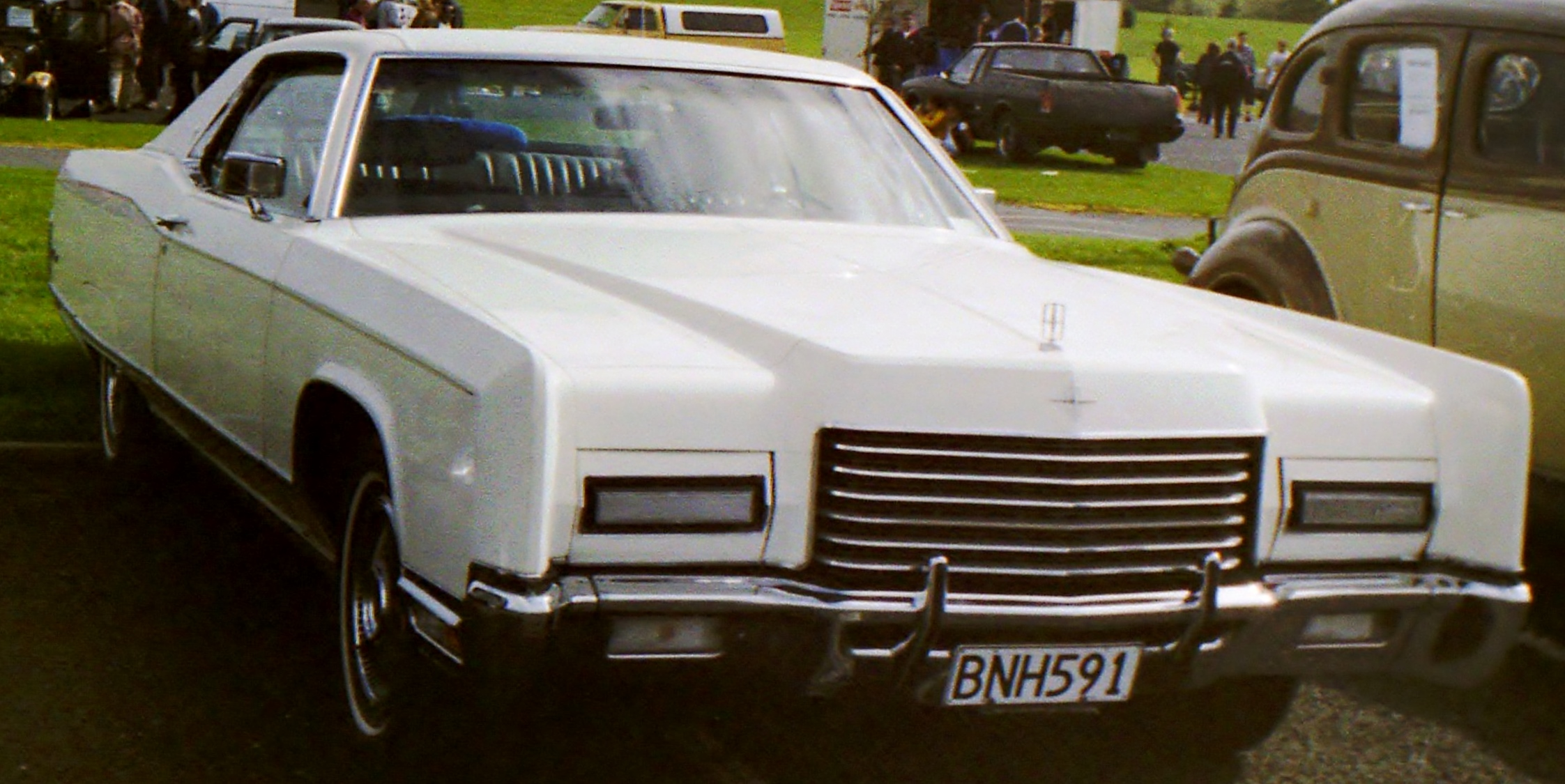
1971 Lincoln Continental 2-door

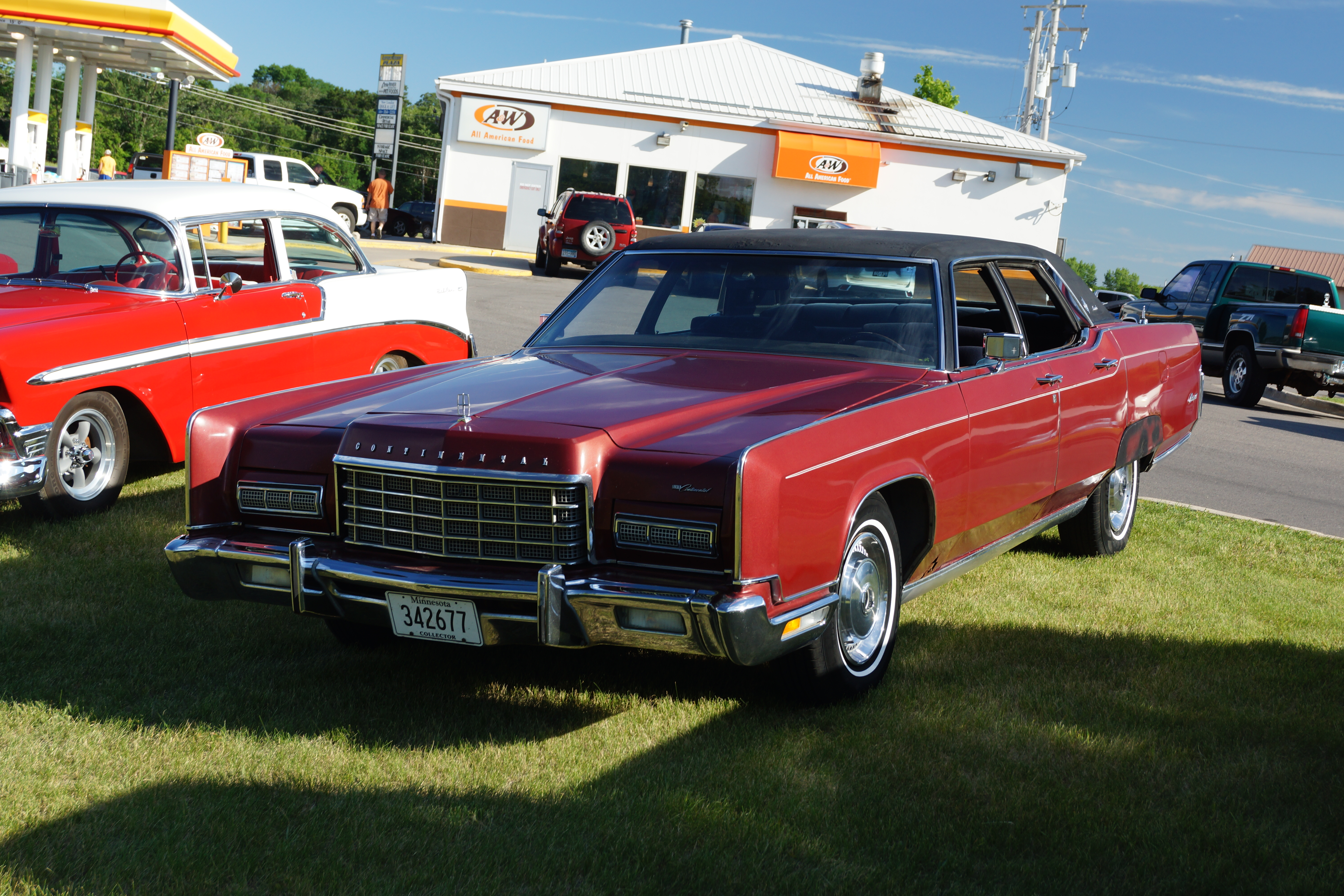
1972 Lincoln Continental Town Car

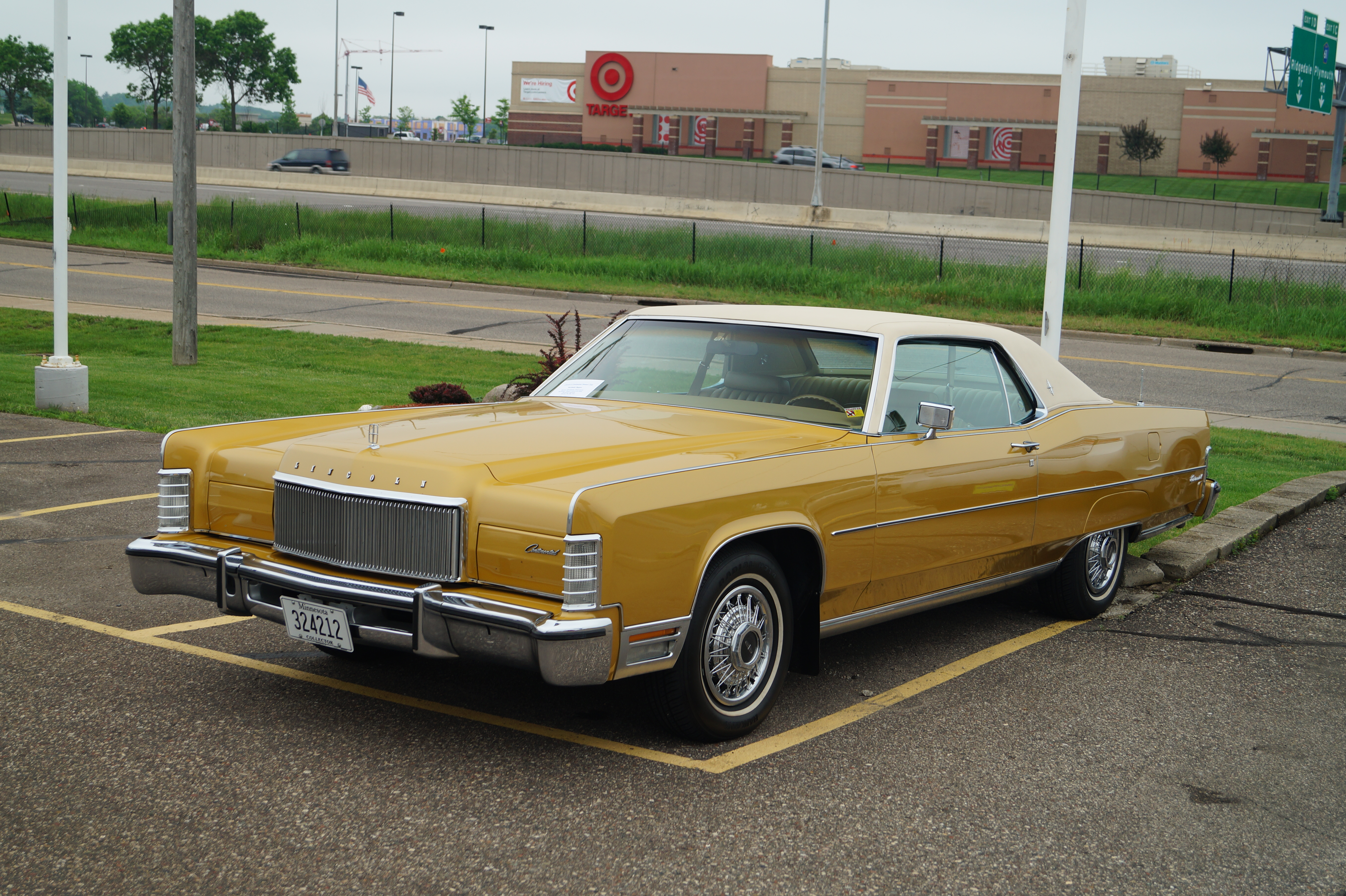
1974 Lincoln Continental Town Coupe

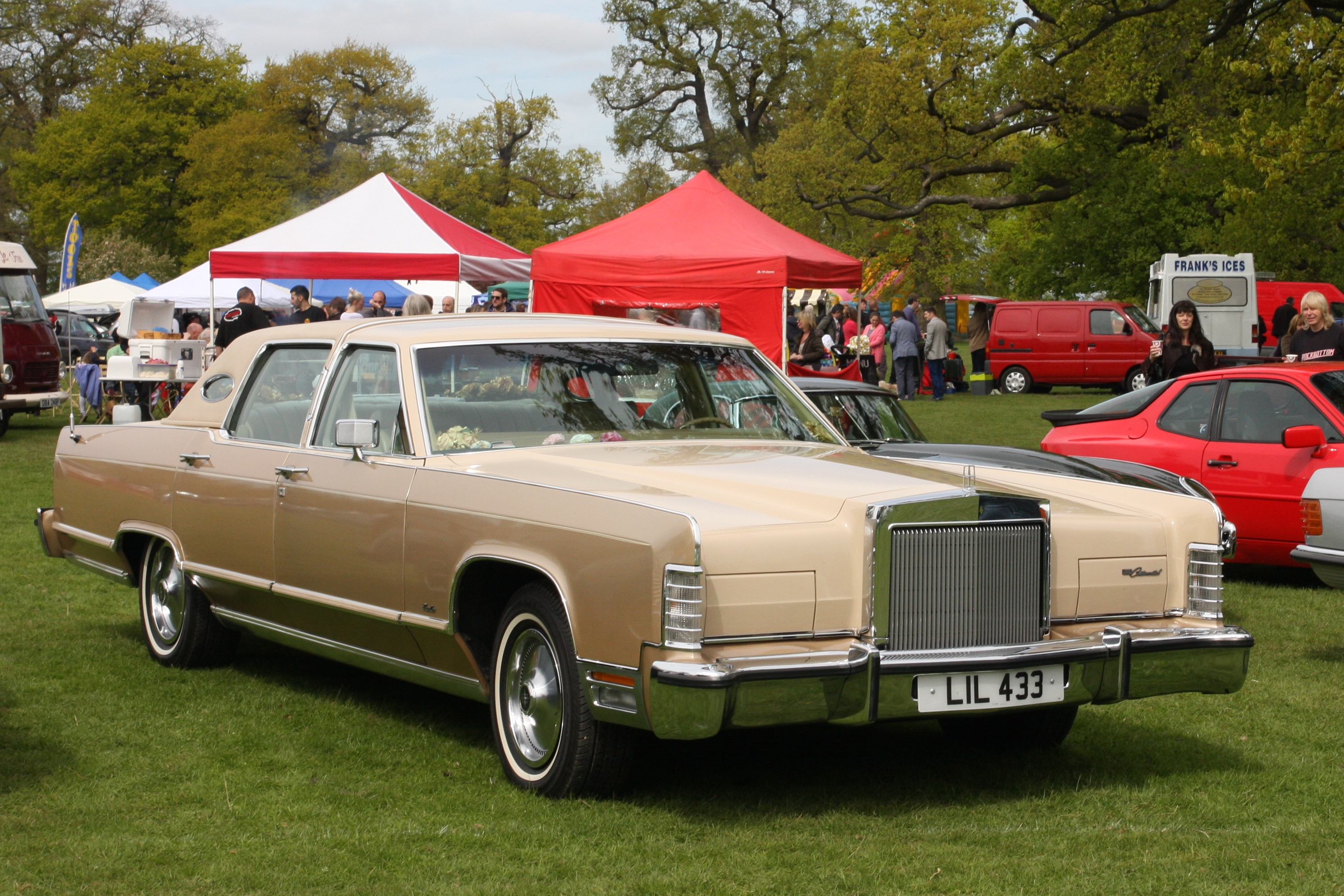
1978 Lincoln Continental Town Car

==== Lincoln Versailles ====
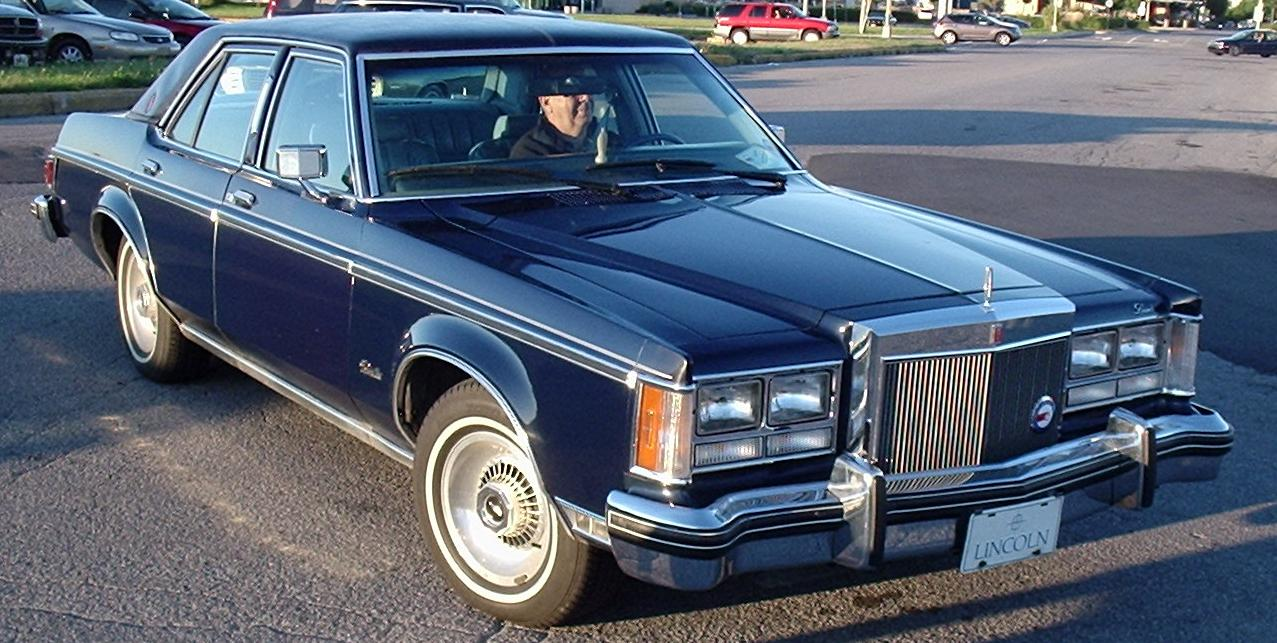
1978 Lincoln Versailles

Developed as a response to the popularity of the 1976 Cadillac Seville, Lincoln introduced the Lincoln Versailles for the 1977 model year. Thirty inches shorter and 1500 pounds lighter than a Lincoln Continental, the Versailles was based on the Ford Granada/Mercury Monarch (as the Seville was based on the Chevrolet Nova). Outsold by the Seville by a significant margin, the Versailles was discontinued in early 1980.

With a smaller design and engineering budget than General Motors, Lincoln stylists were unable to give the Versailles a different body design compared to the Cadillac Seville which received a unique body design on an improved Chevrolet Nova platform. Adopting many features from the 1975–1976 Mercury Grand Monarch Ghia, the Lincoln Versailles was given a Continental-style "radiator" grille, quad rectangular headlights (the first Lincoln since 1969 with exposed headlights), and a Continental Mark-style trunk lid with simulated spare tire bulge. However, the Versailles introduced two features to American-market cars: halogen headlights and clearcoat paint. The Versailles was later criticized for being one of the worst examples of badge engineering.

==== Continental Mark IV and Mark V ====
Following the success of the Continental Mark III, Ford chose to develop a successor personal luxury coupe. For 1972, the Continental Mark IV made its debut, redesigned alongside the Ford Thunderbird. While sharing a common roofline with the Thunderbird, from the window line down, the Mark IV had distinct exterior sheet metal, with the return of a radiator-style grille, hidden headlights, and a redesigned spare-tire trunk lid. To distinguish itself from the Lincoln Continental, the Continental Mark IV featured full-height rear-wheel openings, precluding the use of fender skirts.

For the 1976 model year, the Continental Mark IV revived the concept of designer editions established by American Motors Corporation its own Designer Editions. Four versions were available as an option package with color, trim, and interior choices specified by fashion designers (Bill Blass, Cartier, Givenchy, and Pucci). Each carried the designer's signature on the opera windows and was fitted with a 22-karat (92%) gold-plated plaque on the instrument panel which could be engraved with the original owner's name. The concept was successful and would continue on other Lincolns until the end of the 2003 model year.

For 1977, Lincoln-Mercury replaced the Continental Mark IV with the Continental Mark V, a substantial exterior and interior revision of the Mark IV. At over 19 feet long, Mark V is one of the largest "coupes" ever sold in North America. In what would become a design theme for Lincoln into the 1990s, the Mark V used sharp-edged exterior styling with a center radiator grille. Following their 1976 success, the Mark IV adopted the Designer Editions option packages.

While introduced following the beginning of downsizing among American vehicles, the Continental Mark V would go on to become the most successful of all the Mark series vehicles, with over 228,000 sold across three model years.

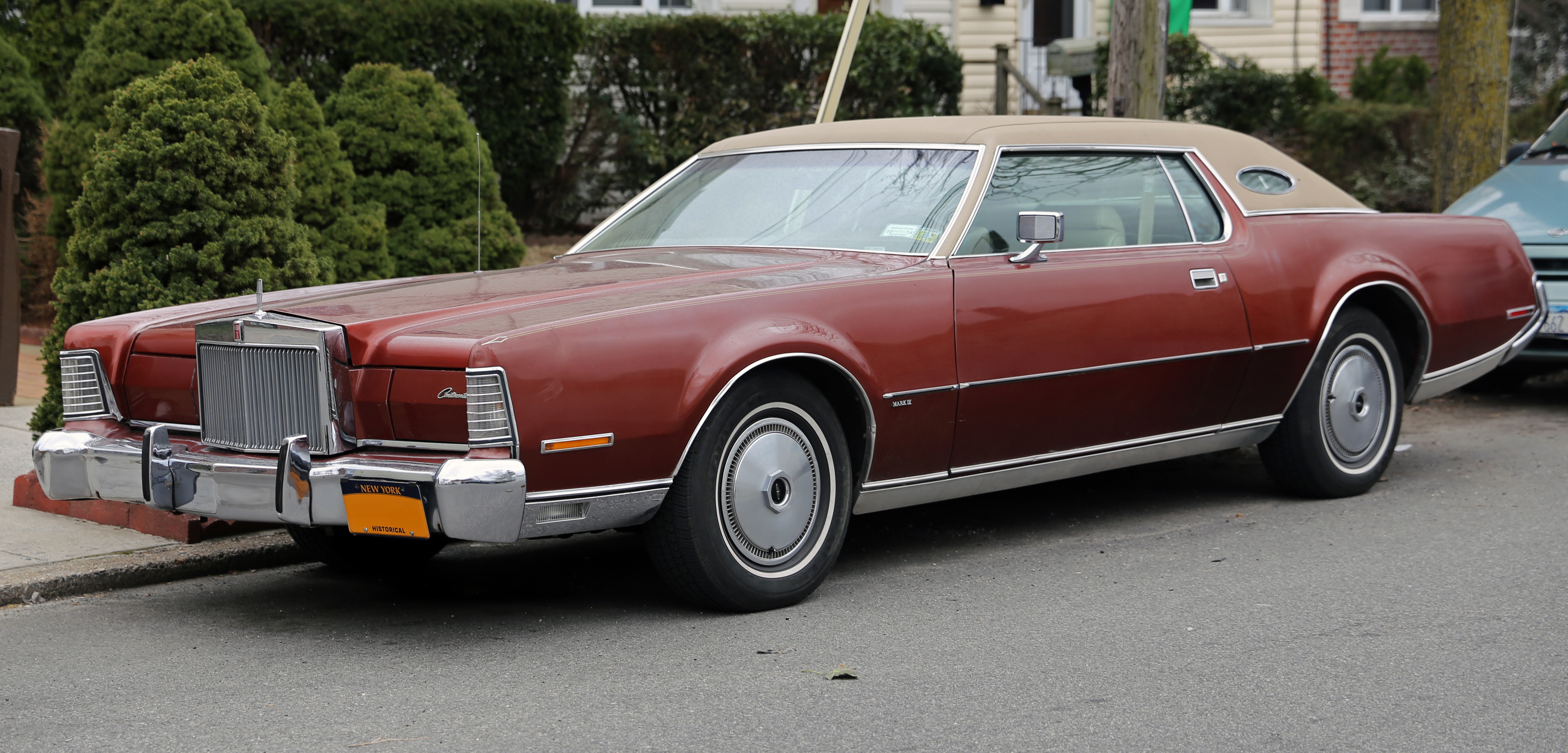
1973 Continental Mark IV

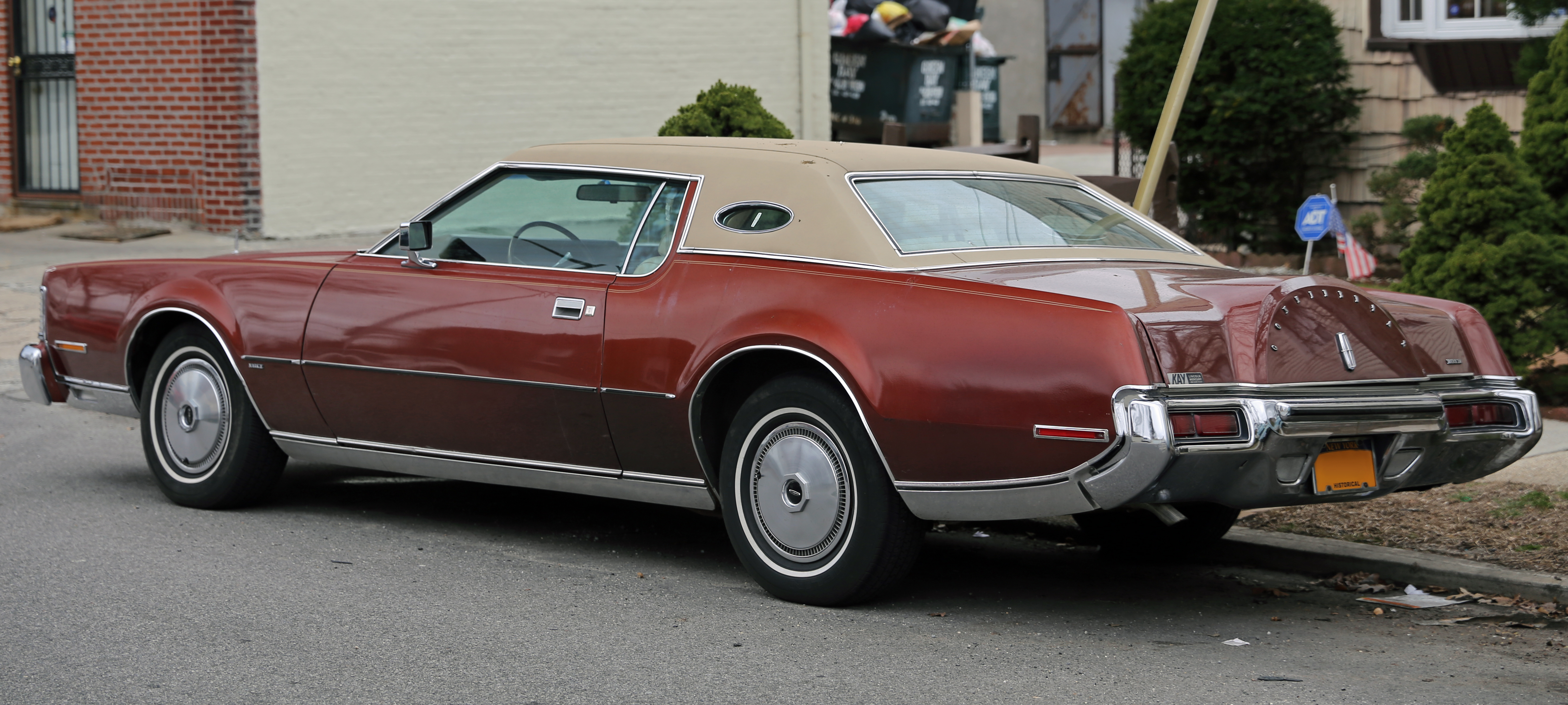
1973 Continental Mark IV, rear view

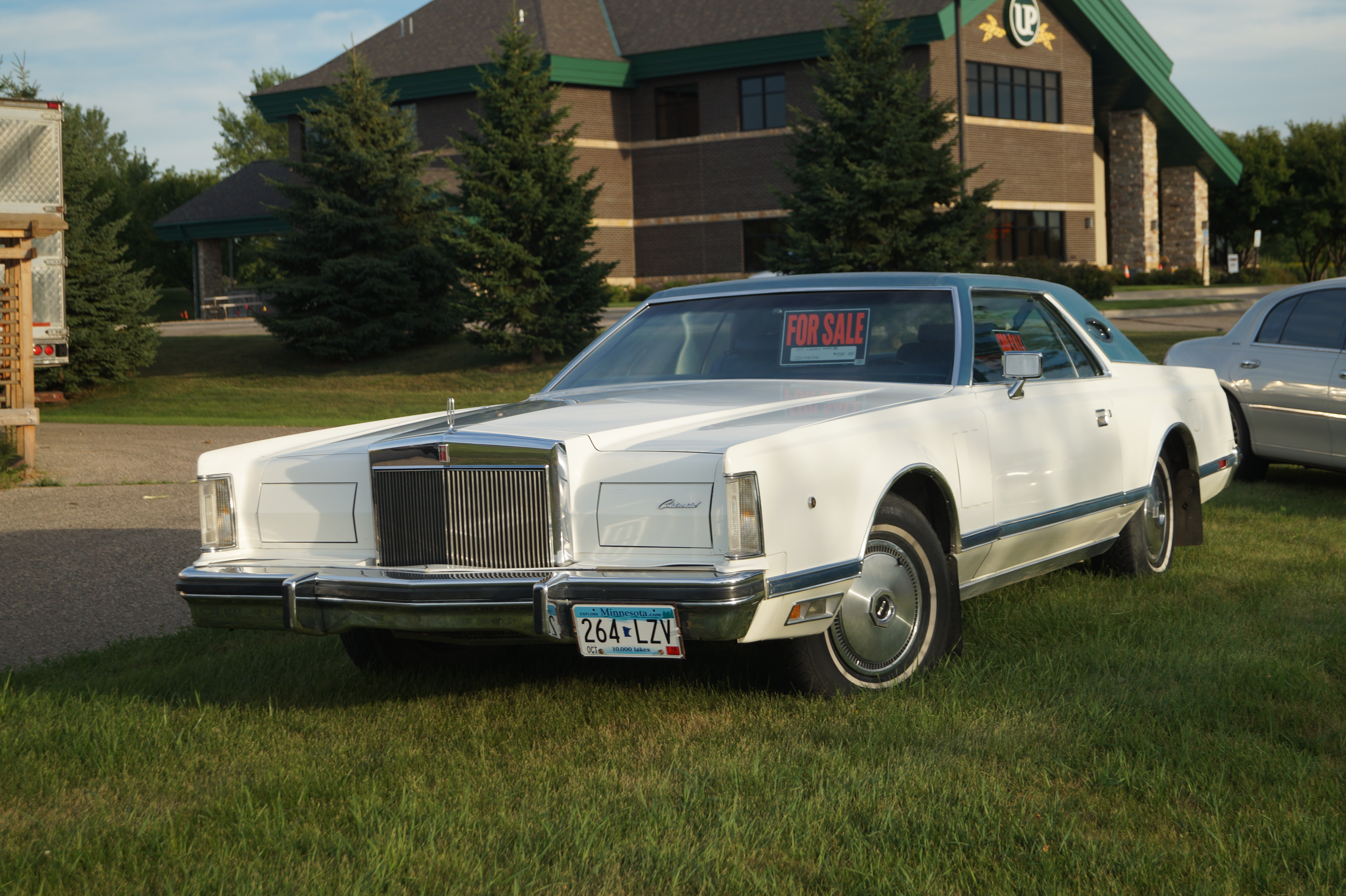
1977 Continental Mark V

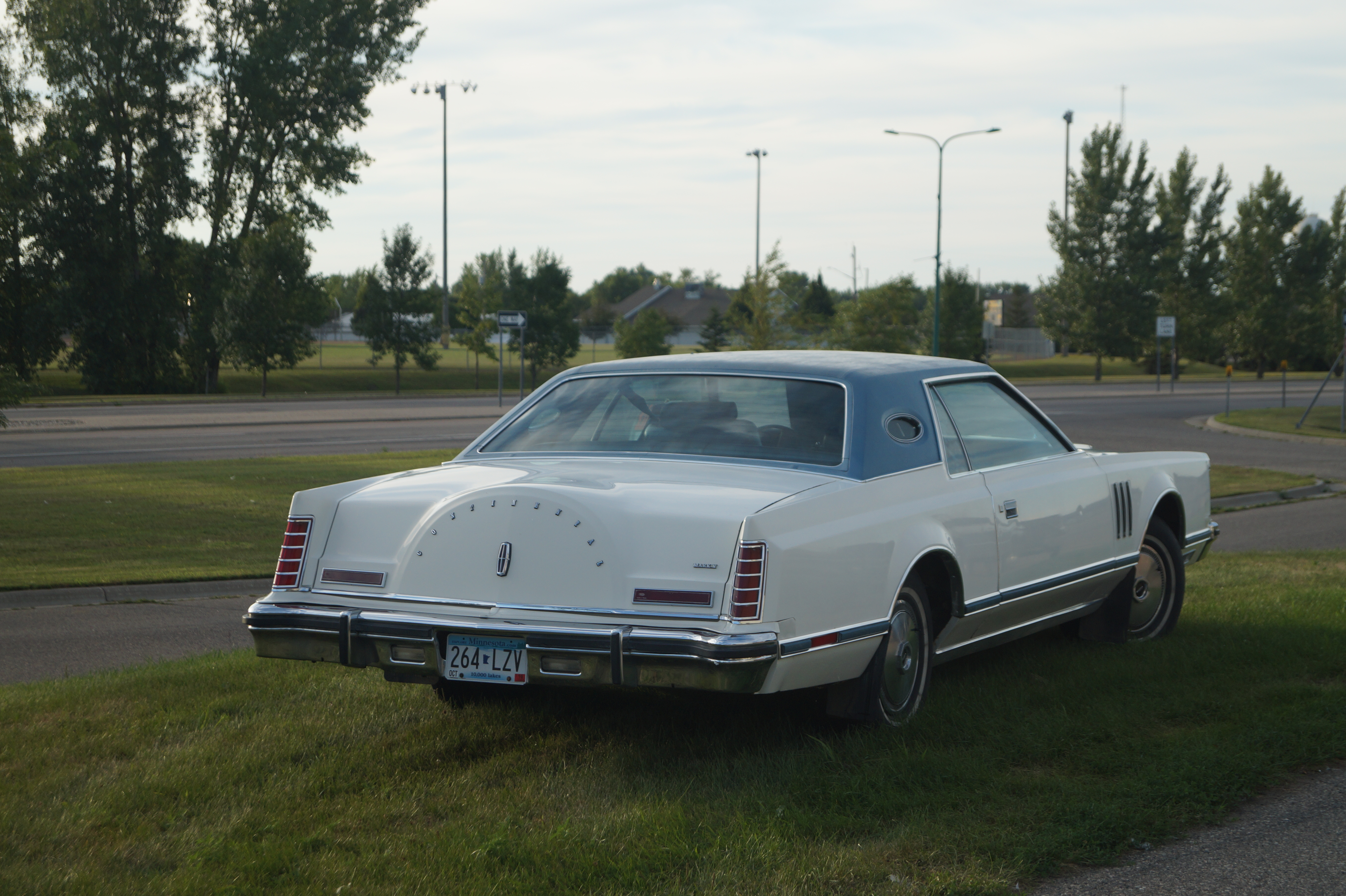
1977 Continental Mark V, rear view

=== 1980s ===
As Lincoln entered the 1980s, the American auto industry remained in the "Malaise era", struggling to balance fuel efficiency, emissions controls, and downsizing; the industry also found itself competing against European and Japanese manufacturers entering segments once dominated by Ford, General Motors, and Chrysler.

As a high point, after a ten-year model cycle, the Lincoln Continental underwent a complete redesign (downsizing for the first time), becoming the lightest Lincoln since World War II. Again sharing chassis underpinnings with Mercury and Ford, the Continental used the Panther platform of the Ford LTD and Mercury Marquis. Coupled with a shift to a 302 cu in (4.9 L) V8, the fuel economy of the Lincoln model line rose nearly 40% in a single year. In contrast, the Lincoln Versailles was withdrawn early in the 1980 model year. As a result, by the end of 1980, Lincoln was marketing three versions of one vehicle. As a response, Lincoln split its two product lines, with the Continental becoming the Lincoln Town Car. After a short hiatus, for 1982, the Lincoln Continental shifted size into the mid-size segment (using the Ford Fox platform). While Lincoln would again compete against the Cadillac Seville (and to a lesser extent, Mercedes-Benz), the division completely erased any visual evidence of badge engineering.

Initially planned for withdrawal in the mid-1980s until the stabilization of fuel prices mitigated fuel-economy concerns, the Lincoln Town Car progressed through the decade largely unchanged (as Ford was pouring resources into the development of the Ford Taurus). While the Town Car retained its traditional layout and large size, fuel prices dropped to a contemporary new low at the time, and operating efficiency became less of a concern to buyers than a decade prior. At the same time, Ford was also benefitting from rival GM having downsized most of their top-trim cars into largely-identical front-wheel-drive models. To capitalize on this, Lincoln introduced a series of advertisements from Young & Rubicam in late 1985 titled "The Valet" which depicted a parking attendant and various well-off customers having trouble distinguishing Cadillacs from lesser Buicks (Electras) and Oldsmobiles (Ninety-Eights), leading to mass confusion; the owner of a Lincoln then appeared with the line "The Lincoln Town Car, please." and drove off as everyone else present continued to squabble over the identical cars.

These ads faced some resistance from within Ford, but Edsel Ford II, then working at the Lincoln-Mercury division, backed them up. The ads debuted, and proved to be a not only a major success for Lincoln (dealers reported not being able to keep cars in stock enough to meet demand), but a major embarrassment for General Motors, whose Cadillac dealers began to complain of lost sales thanks to the ads. The problem was further aggravated by an embarrassing incident in 1986 at Detroit's Oakland University during a gala fundraising event attended by auto industry executives; after a sudden rainstorm moved in, cars belonging to the executives were driven by students (acting as impromptu valets) who called out the make of the car. One was a Cadillac, and people quickly began to shout "No, it's a Buick!" or "No, it's an Oldsmobile" in reference to the Lincoln commercials, and even shouted out brands that had not been mentioned in the ad (Pontiac and Chevrolet), leading to the gather crowd laughing and jeering as more and more identical GM cars were retrieved. This proved to be the final straw for GM, whose chief executive Roger Smith contacted then-Ford chairman Don Petersen, practically begging to have the ads taken off the air. Petersen complied.

The commercial campaign saw the emergence of the new advertising slogan for the brand, "Lincoln. What a Luxury Car Should Be." which was used into the 1990s. Two (somewhat-contradictory) sequels to the first "Valet" ad aired in 1987 (one featuring a similar situation to the first ad involving white GM cars; the other involved the valet having a flashback to the events of the first commercial, only for the valet to be informed that one of the men involved had bought himself a Lincoln; his wife then commented that "He finally listened!") These series of commercials, however, were unable to turn around declining Town Car sales in the long-term. It was only after an all-new redesigned Town Car was introduced in 1989 for the 1990 model year that its sales at least temporarily rebounded.

For 1988, the Lincoln Continental underwent a second redesign. Splitting from the Mark VII, the Continental became the first front-wheel drive Lincoln and was based on an extended-wheelbase version of the Ford Taurus. The 3.8 L V6 engine also marked the first time that a Lincoln did not even offer an 8-cylinder engine. The new Continental was positioned against domestic rivals as well as marketed against European and Japanese-produced luxury sedans. Following the debut of a driver-side airbag in the Ford Tempo, the 1989 Lincoln Continental became the first domestic brand sedan sold in the United States equipped with standard dual airbags. Average annual sales for the new Continental were more than double that of the previous generation model and helped the Lincoln brand to achieve record total sales in 1989 and again in 1990.

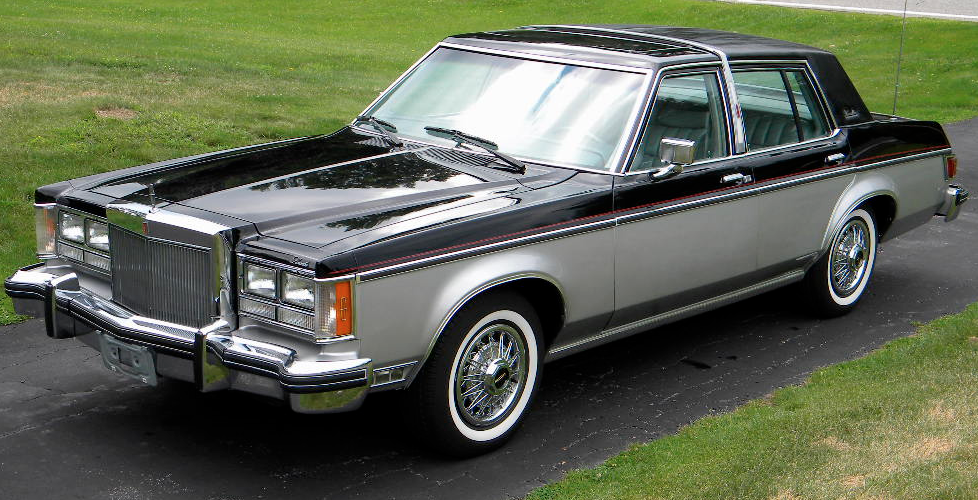
1980 Lincoln Versailles

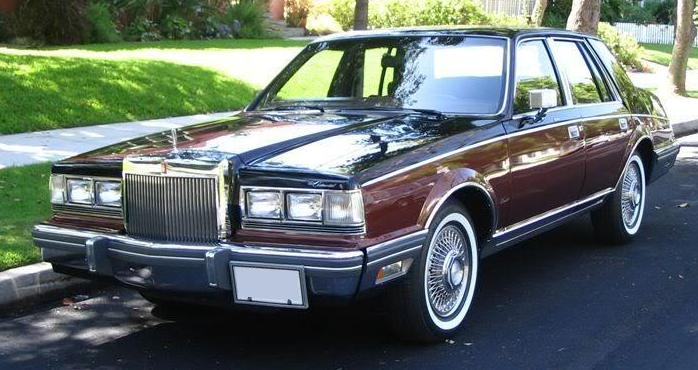
1982 Lincoln Continental Givenchy Edition

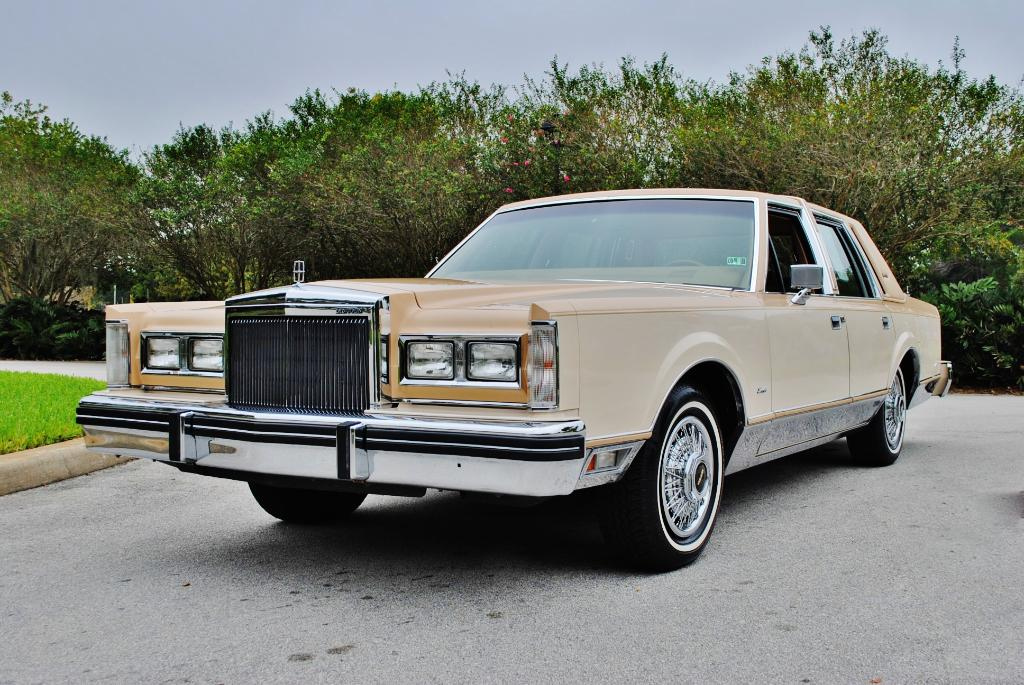
1984 Lincoln Town Car

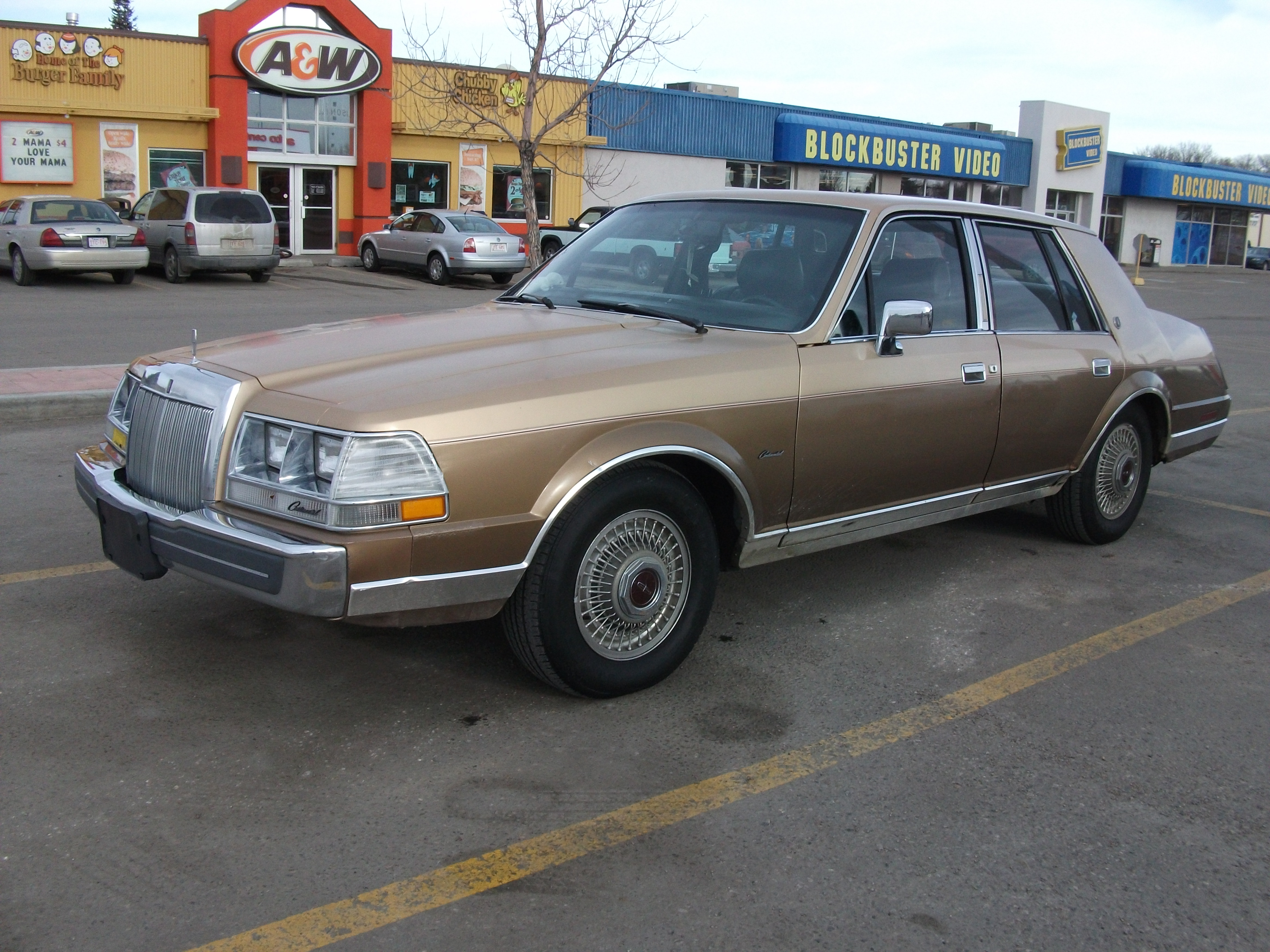
1986–1987 Lincoln Continental

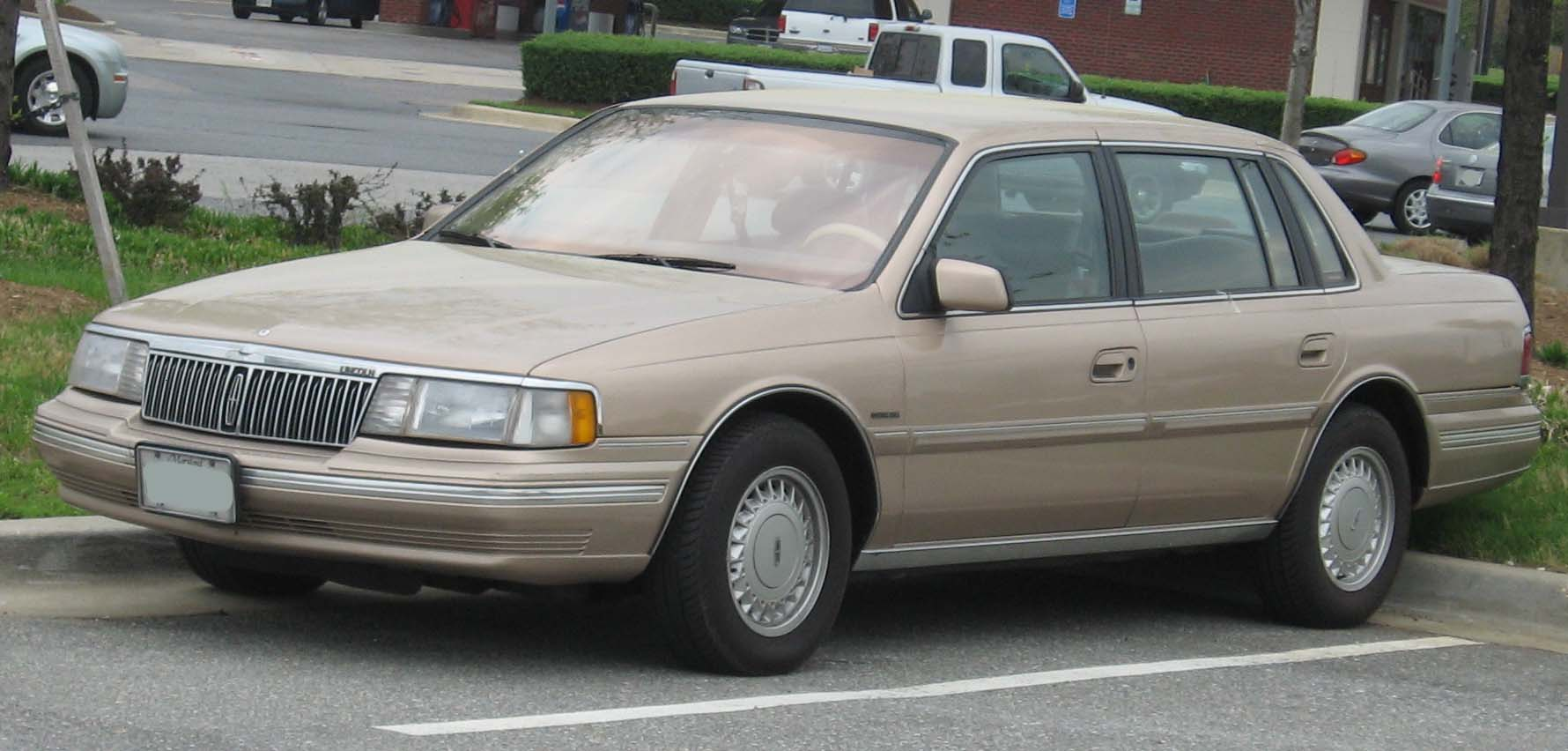
1988–1991 Lincoln Continental

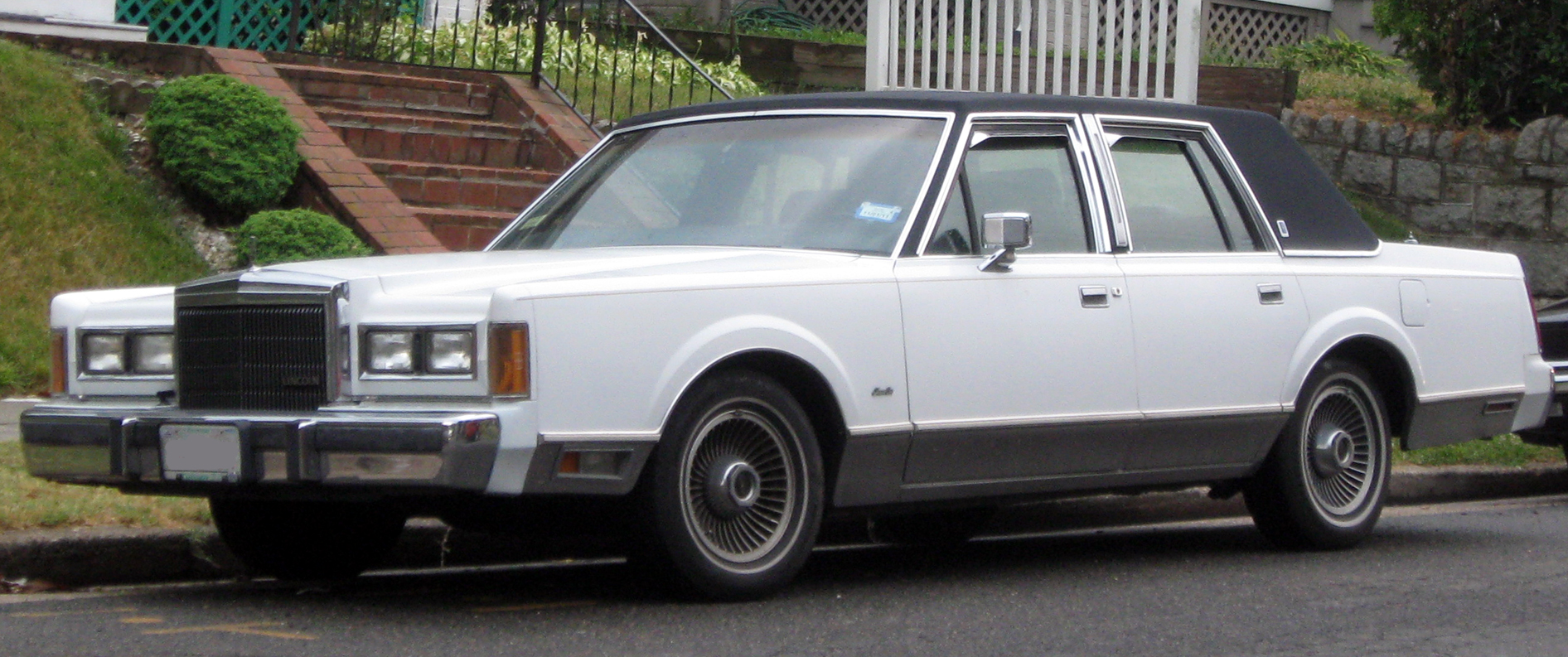
1989 Lincoln Town Car Signature Series

==== Continental Mark VI and Mark VII ====
For 1980, the Continental Mark VI replaced the Mark V after only three years of production. Originally slated to downsize the Mark series into the mid-size segment (adopting the chassis of the Ford Thunderbird), Ford instead chose an intermediate step for the Mark VI, adopting the full-size Panther platform, with the model line sharing much of its body with the 1980 Lincoln Continental. Alongside the traditional two-door coupe (sharing its 114-inch wheelbase used by Ford and Mercury), a four-door sedan joined the Mark series for the first time since the 1958–1960 Mark III–V models (using the 117-inch wheelbase of Lincoln). While sharing much of its body with the all-new Continental/Town Car, many design elements of the successful Mark V made their return, including hidden headlamps, opera windows, and (non-functional) fender louvers; vertical taillamps were joined by a distinct spare-tire decklid. Coinciding with its smaller footprint, the Mark VI saw the standardization of fuel-injected V8 engines (a first for the American auto industry) and the first overdrive 4-speed automatic transmission; along with computer control for the engine itself, the instrument panel replaced analog instruments with digital displays (introducing a trip computer).

Serving as the flagship of the Mark VI model line, the Signature Series trim was introduced for 1980; serving as the successor to the Mark V Collector's Series, the Signature Series included nearly every feature as standard equipment. In 1981, the Signature Series trim was adopted by the Lincoln Town Car (in various forms, throughout its entire production) and by the 1982 Lincoln Continental (for that year only). Slotted below the Signature Series, all four Designer Series options returned (for Mark VI coupes). For 1982, the series underwent a revision, moving the Cartier and Givenchy Editions (to the Town Car and Continental, respectively); the Pucci Edition became offered only as a sedan. The Bill Blass Edition was offered through all four years of production (and returned for the successor Mark VII).

For 1984, the Continental Mark VII replaced the Mark VI, sharing its chassis with the Ford Thunderbird, Mercury Cougar and Lincoln Continental. In an extensive shift away from its Malaise-era predecessors, the Mark VII placed a far greater emphasis on handling and performance capability (though not to the extent of a European grand-touring car), introducing four-wheel disc brakes (with anti-lock capability), four-wheel air suspension, and shared its 4.9L V8 with the Ford Mustang GT.

In contrast to its 1979 Mark V predecessor of five years before, the 1984 Mark VII had shed 27 inches of length and over 1,200 pounds of curb weight. Alongside the base model (dropped after 1987), the Mark VII was marketed in the luxury-oriented Bill Blass Edition (a Gianni Versace edition was also sold from 1984 through 1985) and the higher-performance Mark VII LSC (Luxury Sports Coupe). Coinciding with its mechanical commonality to the 1982–1987 Lincoln Continental, the Mark VII was offered solely as a two-door coupe.

For 1986, the Mark VII adopted the Lincoln brand name to end Continental branding confusion. The last generation of the Mark series sold with a Designer Series option, the Mark VII was produced through the 1992 model year.

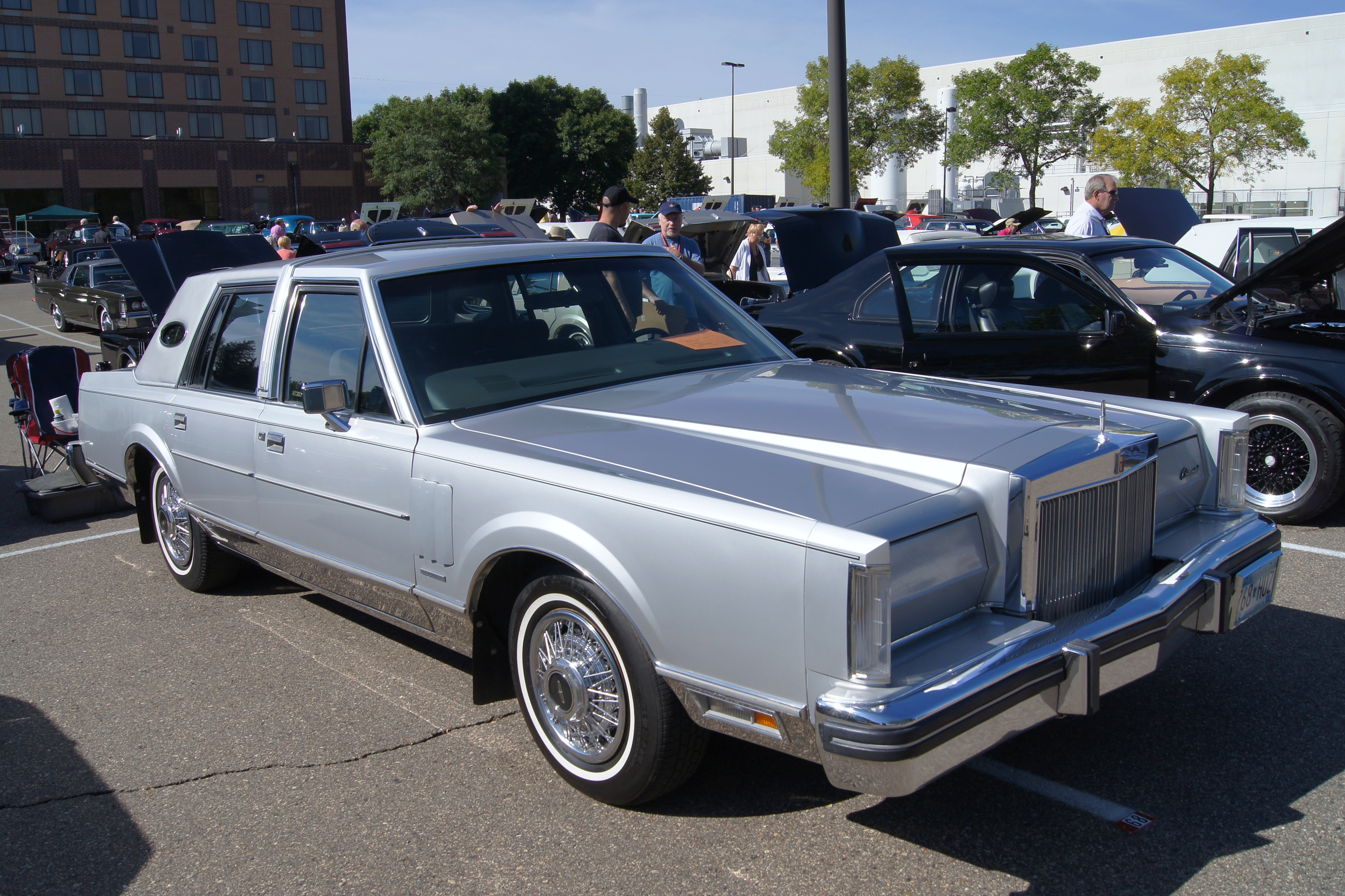
1983 Continental Mark VI

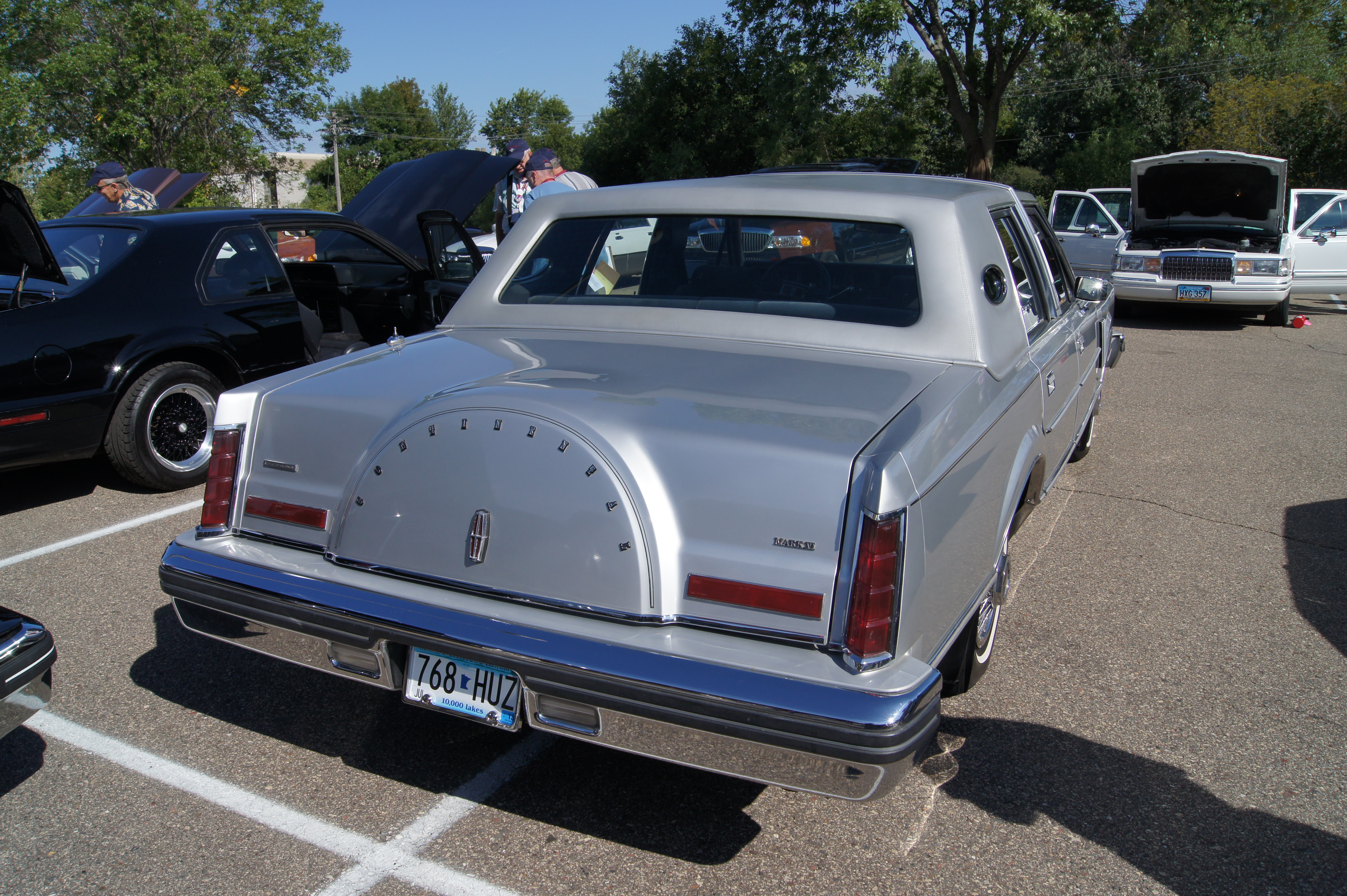
1983 Continental Mark VI

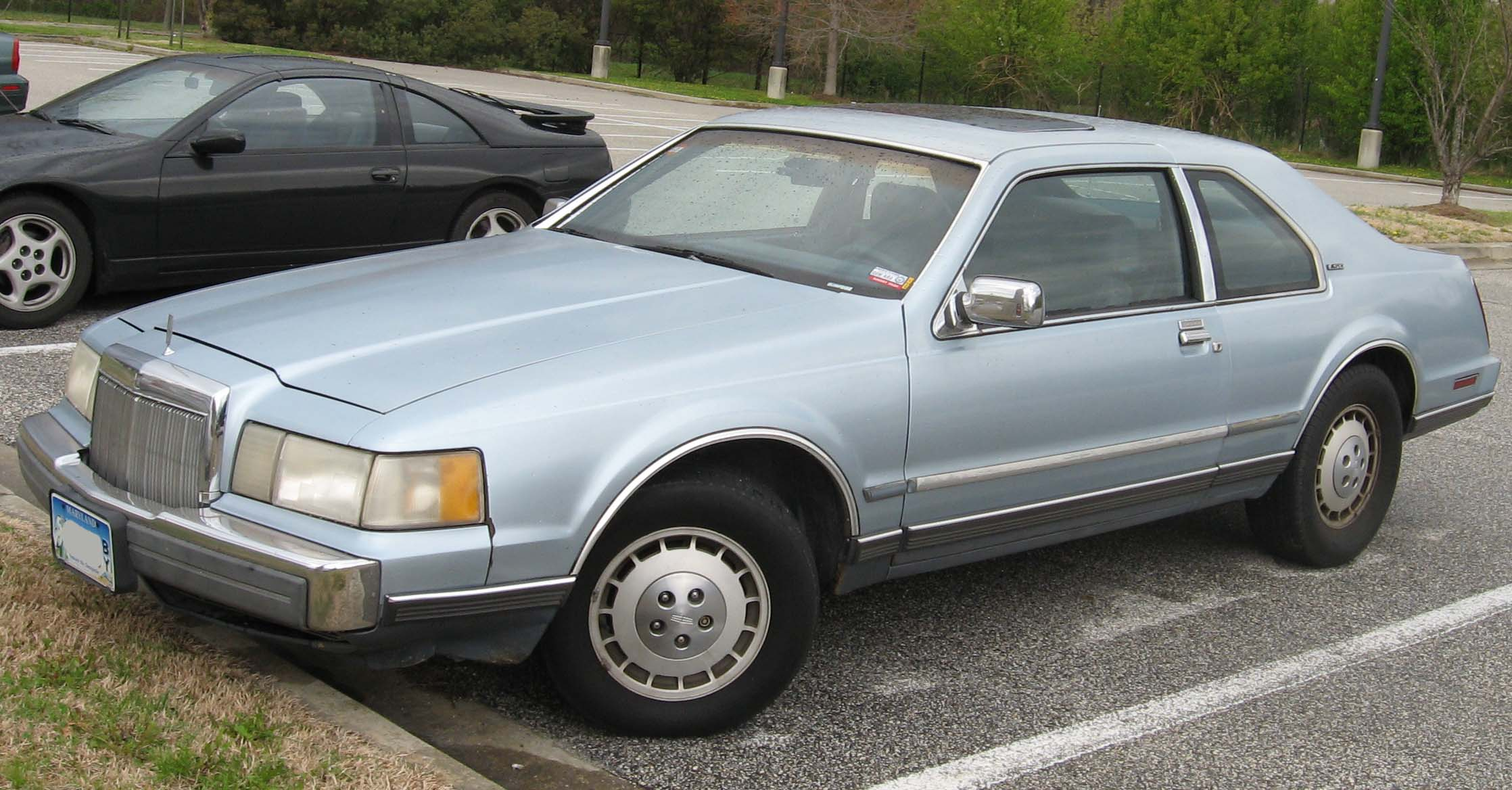
1984–1985 Continental Mark VII LSC

=== 1990s ===
Lincoln entered the 1990s nearly matching rival Cadillac in vehicle sales, but now faced competition from newcomers Infiniti and Lexus.

For 1990, the Town Car underwent a full redesign (after following the traditional nine-year Lincoln model cycle). As the model line represented over half of all Lincoln sales, a redesign of the Town Car proved risky, but was also mandated by passive-restraint requirements and fuel-economy improvements. Shedding its sharp-edged exterior lines to allow for a far sleeker exterior, the Town Car adopted many rounded styling elements from the Mark VII; traditional elements also returned, including a formal rear roofline, radiator-style grille, chrome trim, and C-pillar quarter windows. Delayed until the 1991 model year, the Lincoln Town Car marked the debut of the 210 hp 4.6 L Ford Modular V8 engine, the first overhead-cam 8-cylinder engine used in an American car since the Duesenberg Model J. Built on a revision of the Panther platform, the 1990 Lincoln Town Car shared its underpinnings (but no exterior panels) with the 1992 Ford Crown Victoria (dropping the LTD prefix) and Mercury Grand Marquis.

To meet federal requirements, Lincoln marked the debut of several safety features within Ford Motor Company and within the American luxury segment. Following the 1989 debut of dual airbags in the Lincoln Continental (1990 in the Town Car), antilock brakes (ABS) made their return on the Continental (1988) and on the Town Car (1992).

Following the 1993 introduction of the Mark VIII (see below), the Continental underwent a redesign for 1995, introducing a new version of the Ford Taurus chassis. Styled closer to the Mark VIII, the Continental dropped its V6 in favor of a 4.6L V8 engine from the Mark VIII (tuned for front-wheel drive) to better compete with Japanese and European luxury sedans (in terms of power output).

The Lincoln model line underwent a significant transition for the 1998 model year. Alongside a mid-cycle revision of the Continental, the Town Car underwent a complete redesign of its body. The tallest Lincoln sedan in 40 years, the 1998 Town Car adopted the rounded exterior of the Mark VIII and Continental with a completely new interior. The Lincoln Navigator (see below) made its debut as the first Lincoln SUV, as the division fielded four model lines for the first time.

Bolstered by the launch of the Navigator, 1998 marked the first year Lincoln outranked Cadillac in vehicle sales (by over 4,500 vehicles).

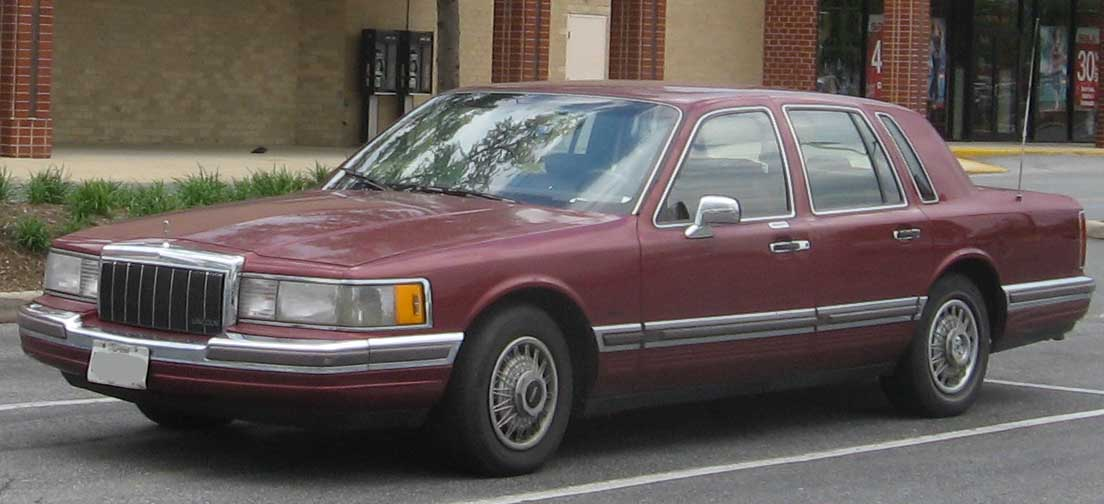
1990–1992 Lincoln Town Car

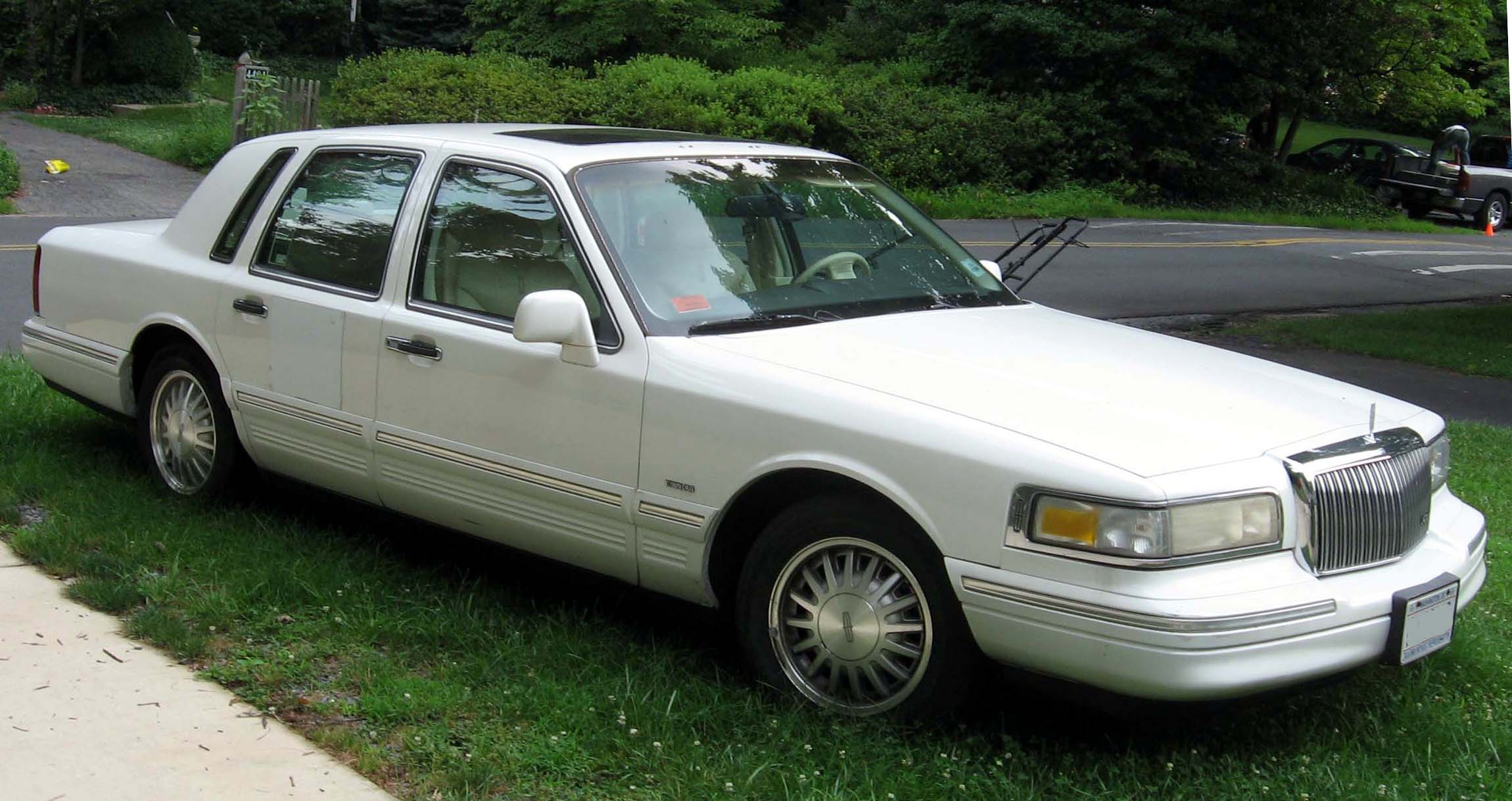
1995–1997 Lincoln Town Car

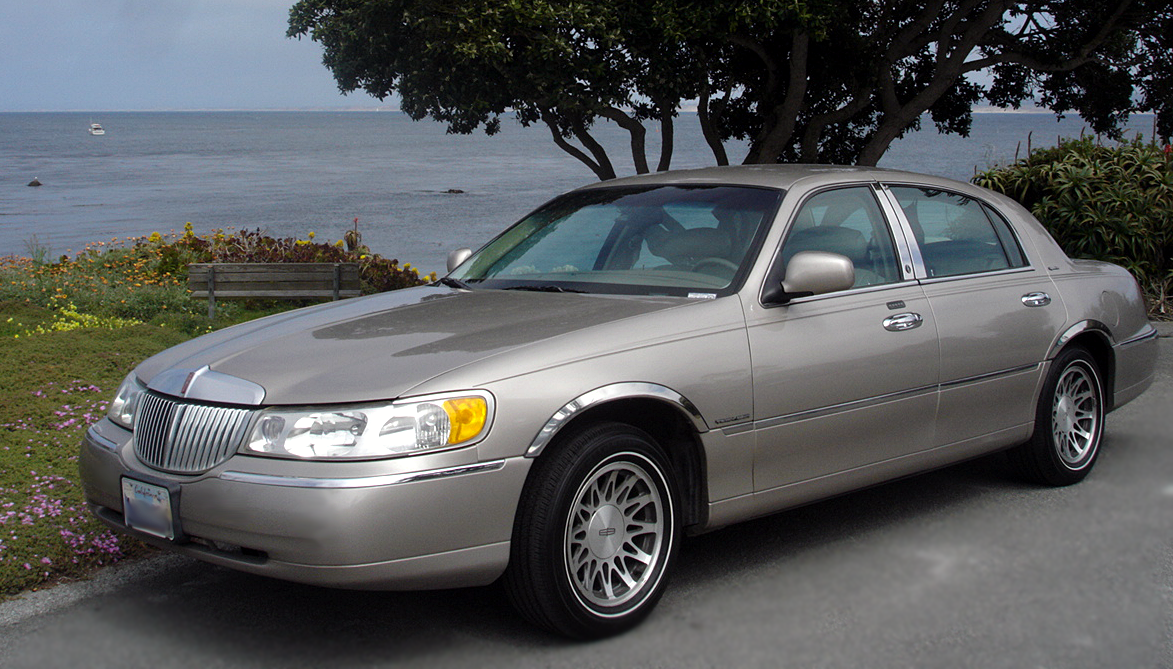
1998–2002 Lincoln Town Car Signature Series

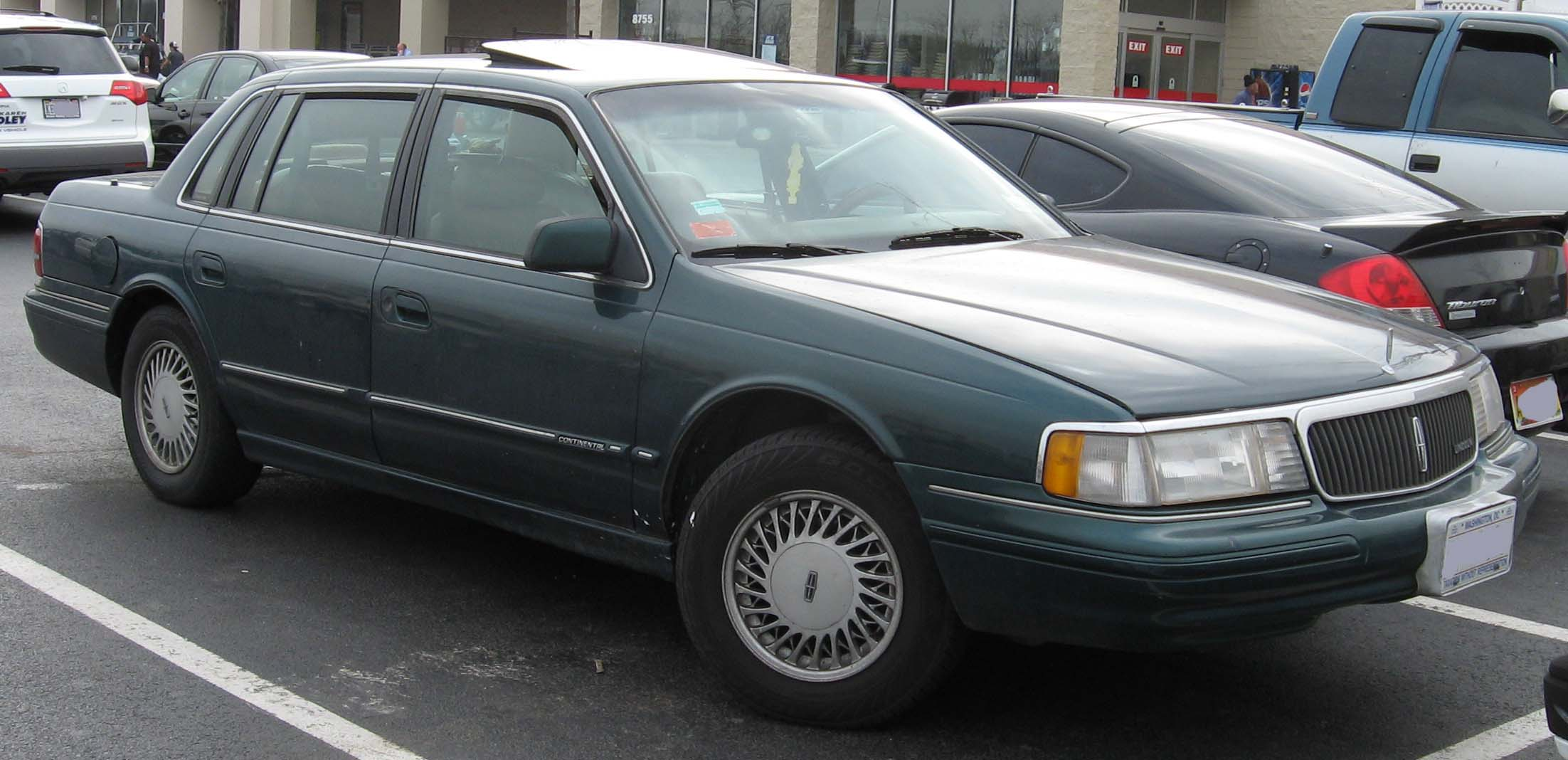
1994 Lincoln Continental

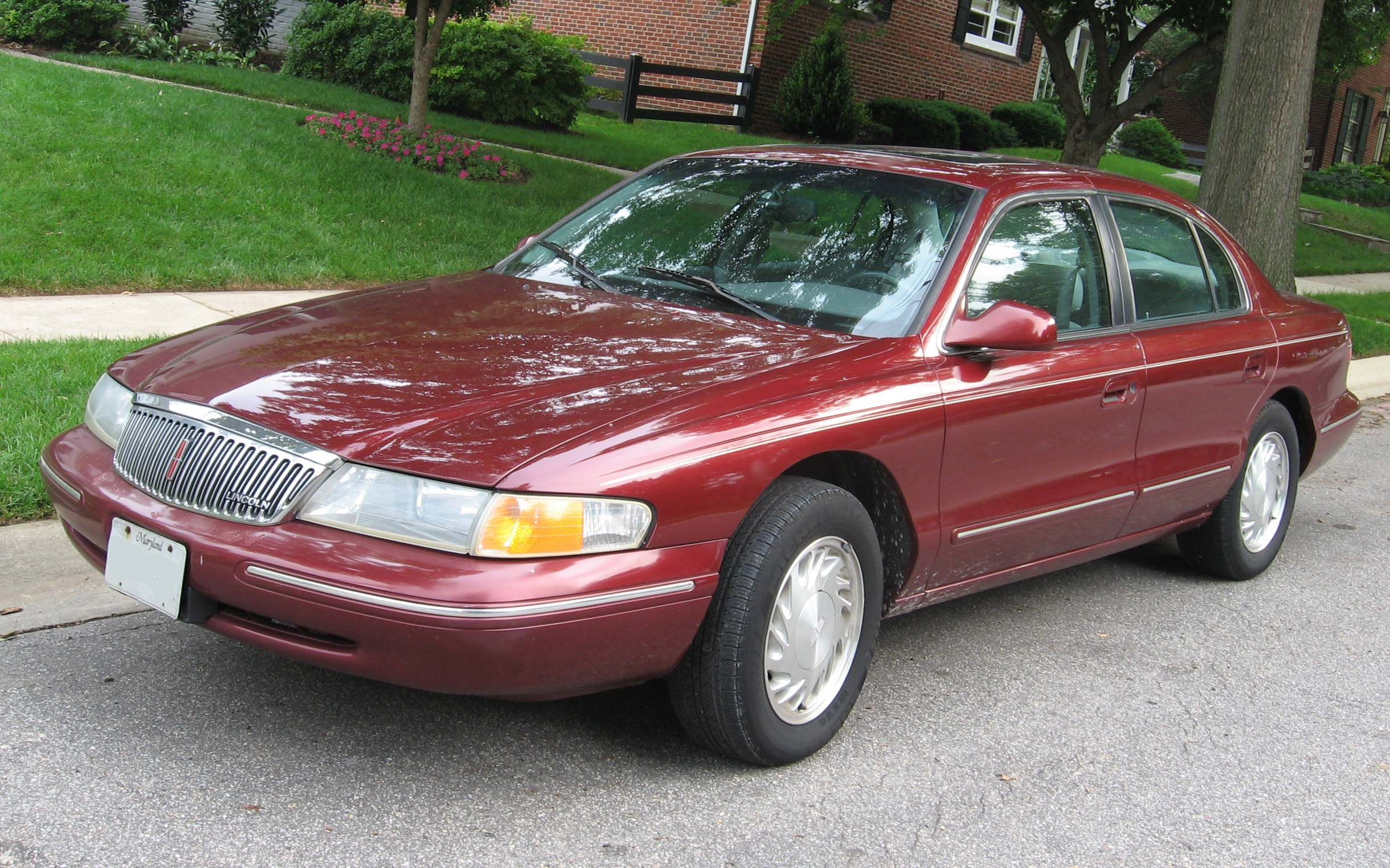
1995–1997 Lincoln Continental

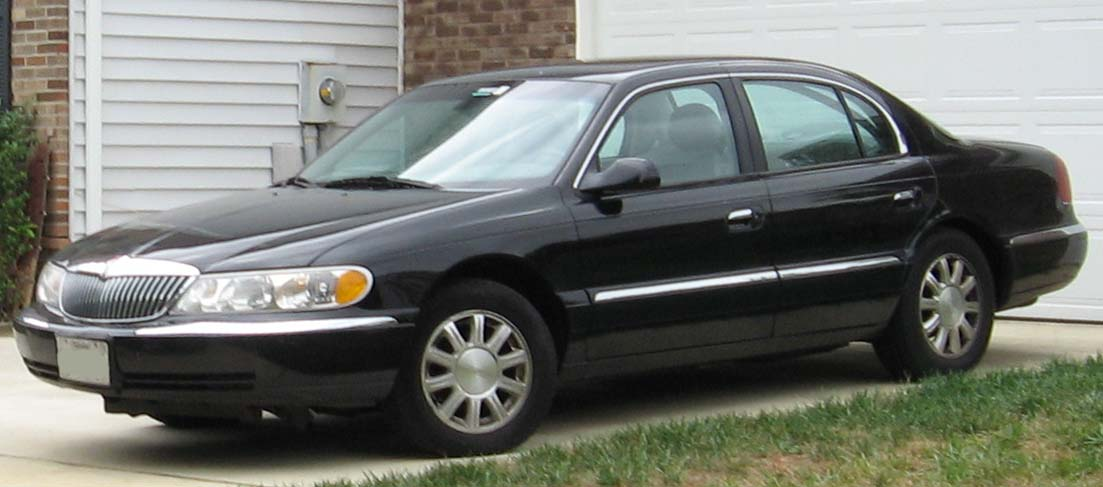
1998–2002 Lincoln Continental

==== Lincoln Mark VIII ====
For the 1993 model year, the Lincoln Mark VII was replaced by the Lincoln Mark VIII. The first generation of the Mark series originally branded as a Lincoln, the Mark VIII remained a variant of the Ford Thunderbird/Mercury Cougar, shifting from the 1980 Fox chassis to the FN10 chassis (a Lincoln version of the MN12 chassis). Placing further emphasis on handling, the Mark VIII retained rear-wheel drive and adopted four-wheel independent suspension (with the Mark VIII and Thunderbird/Cougar as the only American-produced four-seat cars of the time with both chassis features). The body was streamlined further to modernize its exterior (relegating the spare-tire decklid to vestigial status). In massive contrast to its 1970s predecessors, the Mark VIII was given a cockpit-style interior, with all controls oriented towards the driver.

Alongside a standard trim, the LSC (Luxury Sports Coupe) made its return as the flagship Mark VIII model; Designer Editions were discontinued. Though positively received by both critics and buyers, sales of mid-size luxury coupes were on decline during the 1990s. After the 1998 model year, the Mark VIII was withdrawn (outliving the Thunderbird and Cougar by a year). As of current production, the Lincoln Mark VIII remains the final generation of the Lincoln Mark series. In various forms, elements of the Mark VIII design were adopted by other Lincolns (the 1995 Lincoln Continental, the 1995 Lincoln Town Car interior, and the 1998 Town Car exterior) and other Ford Motor Company products (the Ford Windstar minivan interior).

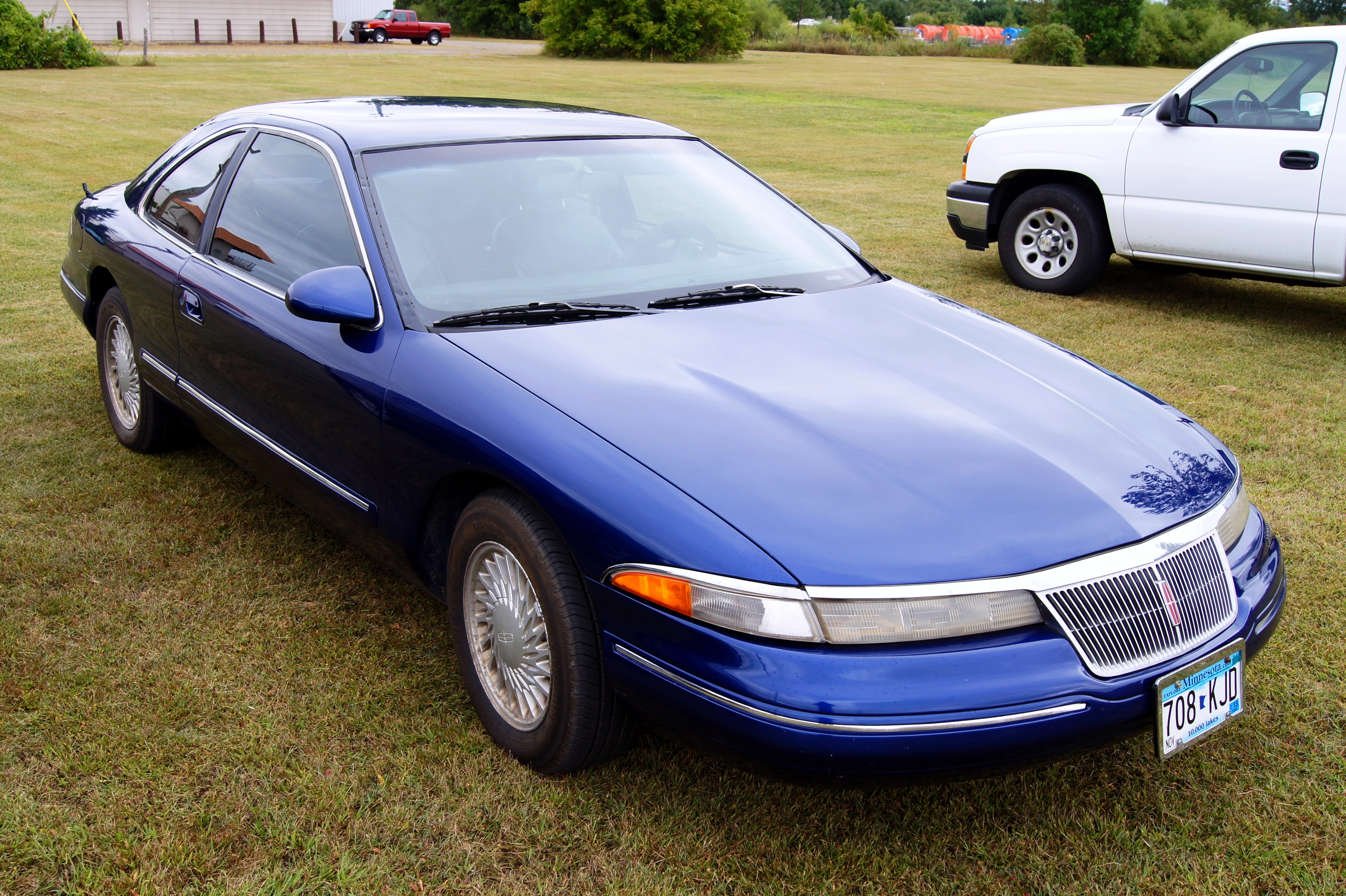
1993 Lincoln Mark VIII

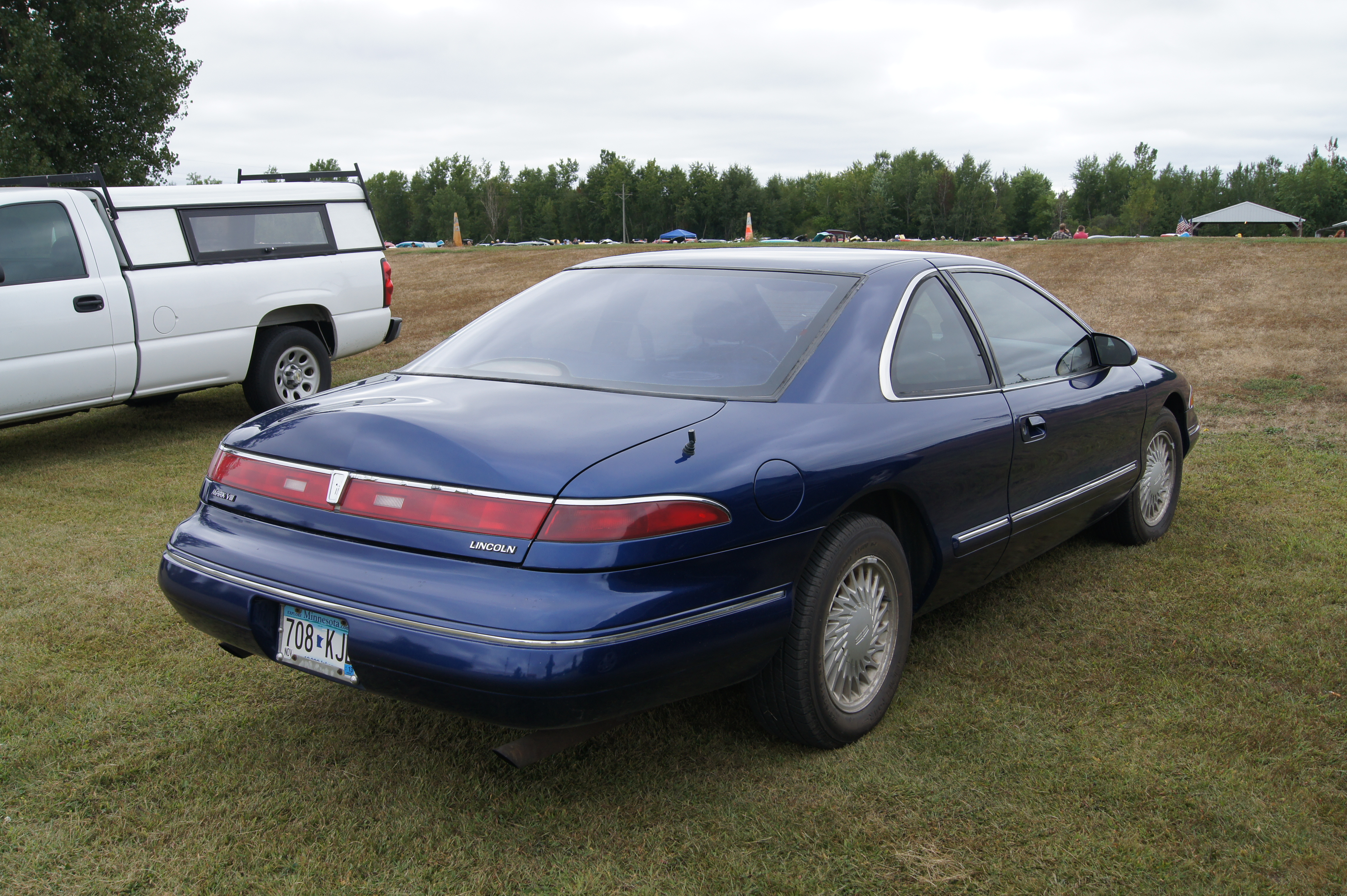
1993 Lincoln Mark VIII

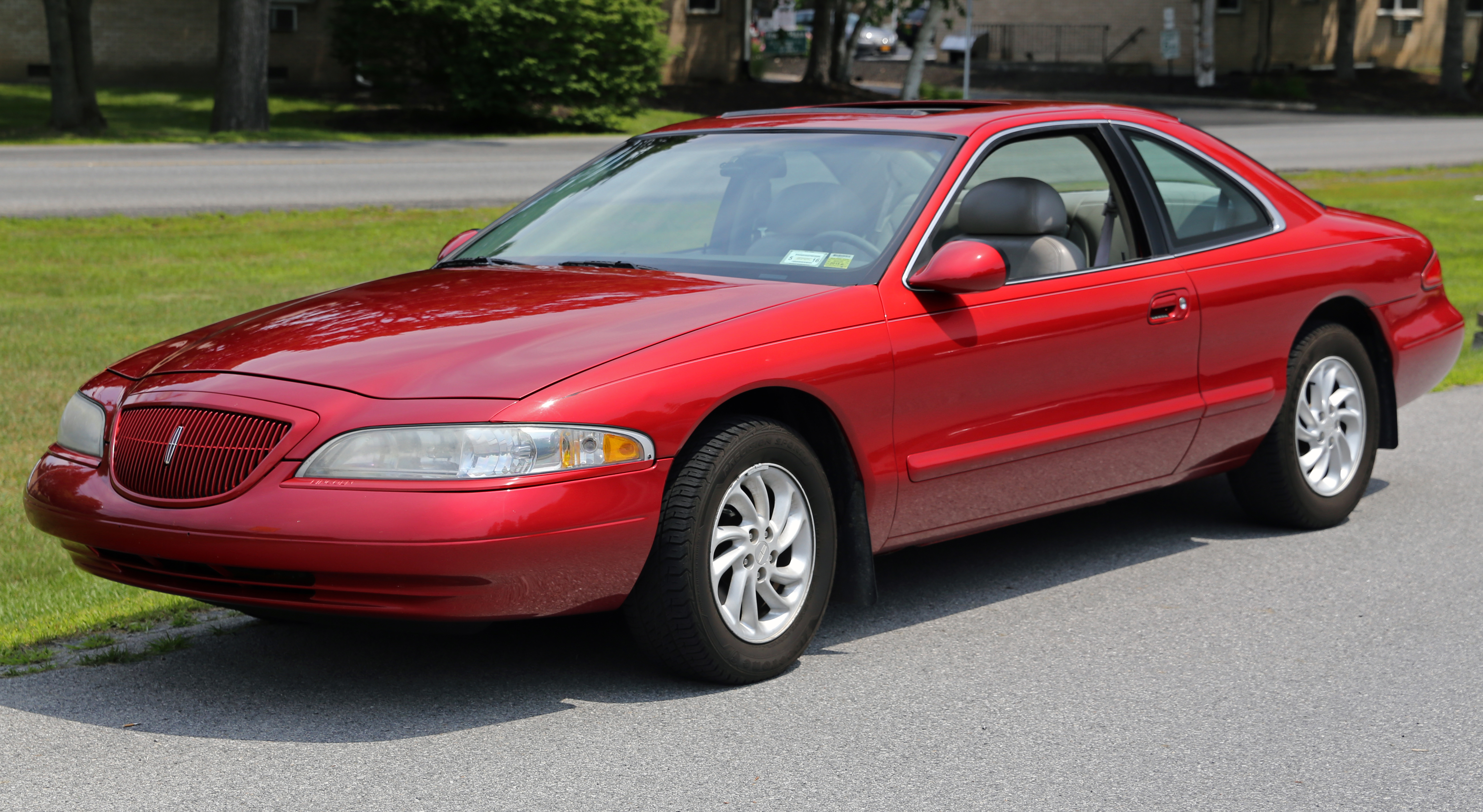
1998 Lincoln Mark VIII LSC

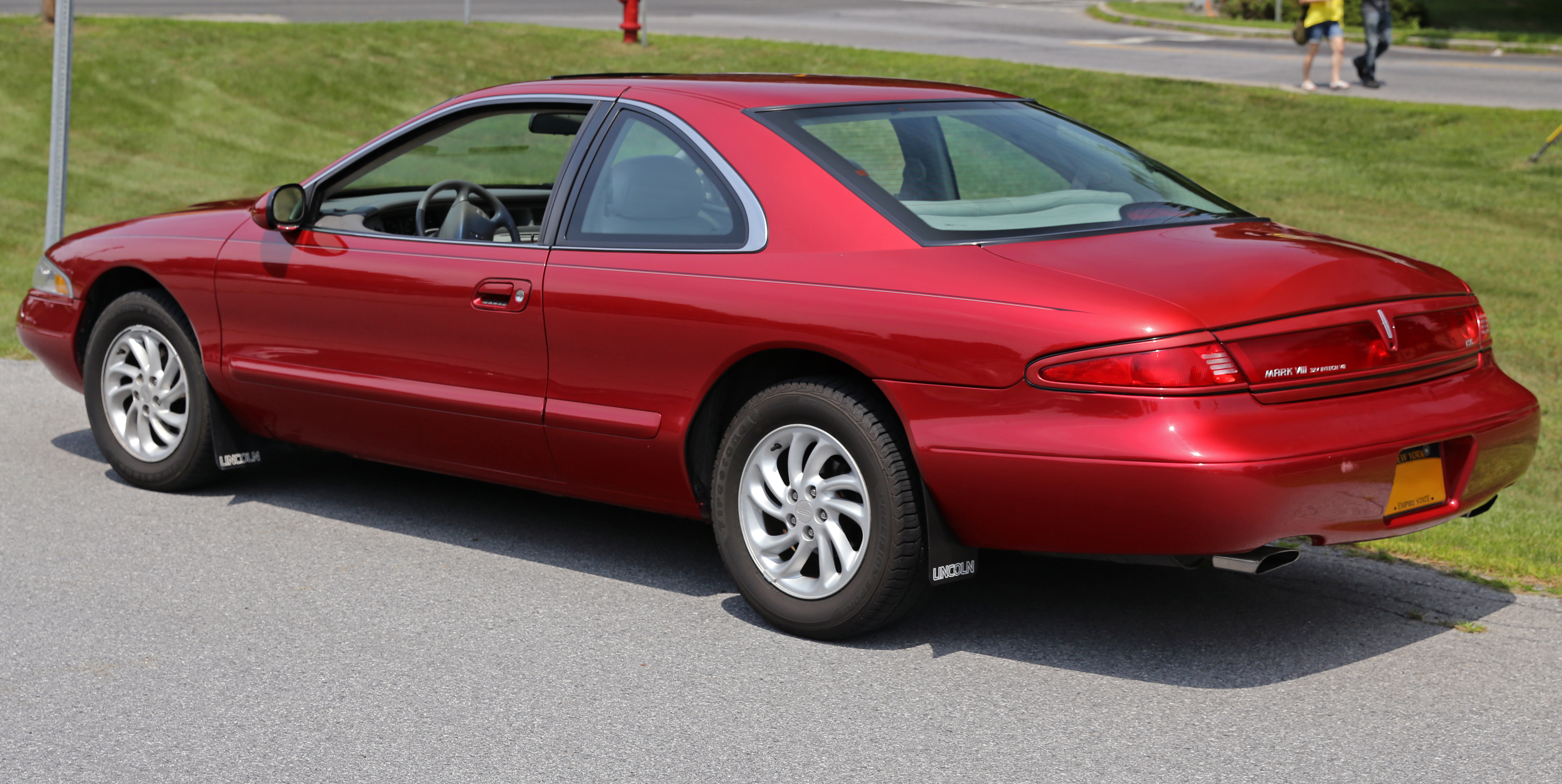
1998 Lincoln Mark VIII LSC

==== Lincoln Navigator ====
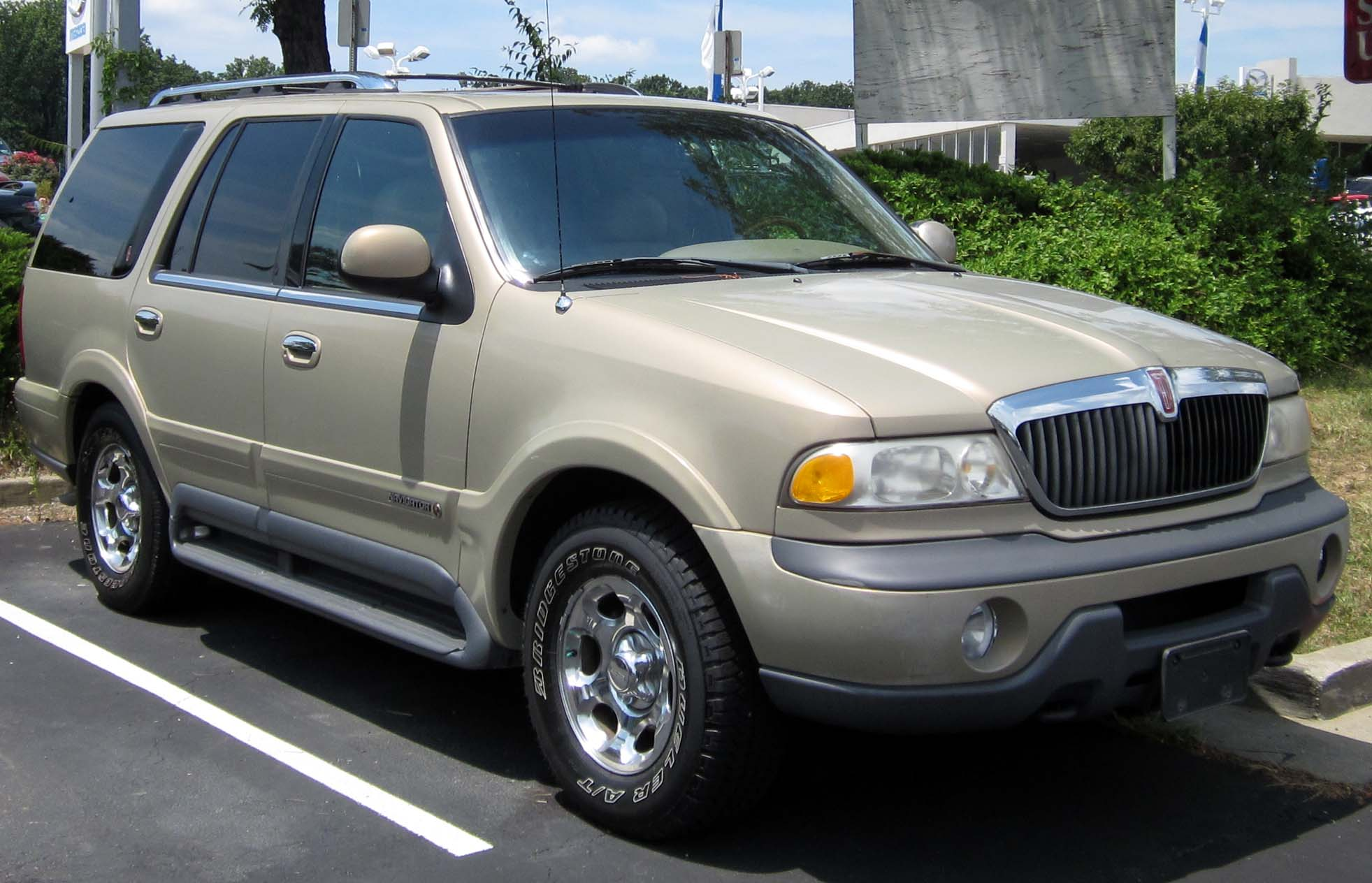
1998-2000 Lincoln Navigator

For 1998, Lincoln introduced the Lincoln Navigator full-size SUV, its first new nameplate since the Versailles (outside of the Mark series), derived from the Ford Expedition (itself based on the Ford F-150). Developed as a competitor for the Range Rover, Mercedes-Benz M-Class, and Toyota Land Cruiser/Lexus LX450, the truck-based design of Navigator allowed increased cargo and towing capability over its competitors (rated at 8,500 pounds for 1999). The Navigator also offered standard third-row seating for up to 8 passengers (offered only on the Land Cruiser/LX).

Sharing no common bodywork with the Expedition forward of the windshield, the Navigator shared several design elements from the 1998 Town Car, including its use of body-color bumpers, chrome license-plate surround (the only chrome on the rear liftgate), and conservative use of chrome (primarily on the grille, door handles, and window trim); in modified form, the grille was later used on the later Lincoln LS and Lincoln Aviator.

In an extended debut model year, the Navigator became the second-most popular Lincoln vehicle behind the Town Car, selling 71,000 examples. In response, General Motors launched its own luxury-brand full-size SUVs, deriving the GMC Yukon Denali and Cadillac Escalade from the Chevrolet Tahoe.

=== 2000s ===
As the division entered the 21st century, Lincoln began a period of major transition. In addition to ending production of the long-running Mark series, the Lincoln Navigator SUV had entered production, nearly unchallenged by European and Japanese manufacturers. As buyers of mid-size coupes in the luxury segments had shifted towards sports sedans, Lincoln developed an entry for the segment in the place of the Mark VIII. For 2000, Lincoln introduced the Lincoln LS mid-size sports sedan; coinciding with Premier Automotive Group (see below), the LS was developed alongside the Jaguar S-Type. Though the two vehicles shared a common chassis and related powertrain, no body panels were common between the two vehicles. The shortest Lincoln ever produced at the time, the LS was developed to compete with European and Japanese-produced counterparts, in line with the Cadillac Catera. While the Catera was imported from Germany (as a rebadged Opel Omega), the LS was produced alongside the Town Car and Continental in Wixom Assembly.

For 2002, Lincoln introduced the Lincoln Blackwood, the first pickup truck produced by the brand and the second Lincoln manufactured outside of Michigan following the 1977–1980 Versailles. Derived from the Ford F-150 SuperCrew, the Blackwood was fitted with the front bodywork of the Lincoln Navigator and a model-specific pickup bed (with imitation wood exterior trim). In line with its name, all examples were painted black. The Lincoln Blackwood met with poor reception, due to its limited cargo capability (its pickup bed was effectively a carpeted trunk) and lack of four-wheel drive, leading Lincoln to discontinue the model after a single year of production.

2003 marked a period of transition for the Lincoln model line, as both the Town Car and LS underwent mid-cycle updates (with the Town Car receiving a full chassis redesign), with Lincoln introducing the second generation of the Navigator. To complement the Navigator, Lincoln introduced the Lincoln Aviator mid-size SUV. Sharing the body of the Ford Explorer with the Mercury Mountaineer, the Aviator adopted many styling elements from the Navigator, with a nearly identical interior design. While priced higher than its Mercury Mountaineer counterpart to avoid model overlap, the Aviator struggled to sell, as it competed closely against the Navigator sold in the same showroom. After 52 years of production, the Continental was discontinued for 2003.

For 2005, Lincoln introduced a second pickup truck model line, the Lincoln Mark LT. Again based on the Ford F-150 SuperCrew, the design of the Mark LT was partially derived from the poor reception of the Lincoln Blackwood. While still fitted with Lincoln Navigator bodywork and interior trim, the Mark LT was fitted with a standard pickup bed; the all-wheel drive was available as an option. Following lower-than-expected sales, the Mark LT was withdrawn from the United States in 2008; in Mexico (where the Mark LT was the highest-selling vehicle of the brand) Lincoln continued sales of the Mark LT through 2014.

During 2006, The Way Forward restructuring plan (see below) began to take effect on Ford Motor Company, with the Lincoln LS ending production. To replace the LS, Lincoln introduced the Lincoln Zephyr for 2006. In what would be the smallest Lincoln sedan ever, the Zephyr was derived from the Ford Fusion mid-size sedan. In an effort to distinguish itself from its Ford and Mercury counterparts, the Lincoln Zephyr adapted styling elements from Lincoln vehicles of the past, including a wide rectangular grille (the 1960s and 1970s Continentals), wraparound headlamps (late 1960s Continentals), and twin-pod dashboard (early 1960s Continental).

In 2007, as another part of The Way Forward, Lincoln began a rebranding of its model line. As Ford considered the Lincoln Mark series to have high nameplate recognition, Lincoln began to introduce similar "MK" branding across the model lineup. For 2007, the Lincoln Zephyr was rebranded as the Lincoln MKZ ("em-kay-zee"), with the 2007 Lincoln MKX ("em-kay-ex") crossover SUV introduced. Originally slated to become the second-generation Lincoln Aviator, the MKX was the Lincoln counterpart of the Ford Edge. Alongside the Lincoln Town Car, the Lincoln Navigator was not included with the MK rebranding; for 2007, it was redesigned alongside the Ford Expedition, marking the debut of the extended-length Navigator L. For the last time, a Designer Series Lincoln was produced, as Lincoln discontinued the trim on the Town Car after 2007. Produced only as a concept car, the 2007 Lincoln MKR marked the debut of the Ford EcoBoost V6.

For 2009, Lincoln introduced its first all-new full-size sedan since 1980, the Lincoln MKS. Intended to be phased in as the replacement for the Lincoln Town Car, the MKS was the Lincoln counterpart of the Ford Taurus. Built on a Volvo-derived chassis, the MKS was the first full-size Lincoln with front-wheel drive (or optional all-wheel drive); shared with the Ford Taurus SHO, a 3.5L twin-turbocharged V6 was an option. Derived from the 2007 MKR concept, the MKS marked the production debut of the "split-wing" grille, a design element similar to the 1930s Lincoln Zephyr. A year later, the division introduced the Lincoln MKT crossover SUV, a counterpart of the Ford Flex. Sharing its chassis with the MKS, the MKT was sized between the MKX and standard-wheelbase Navigator.

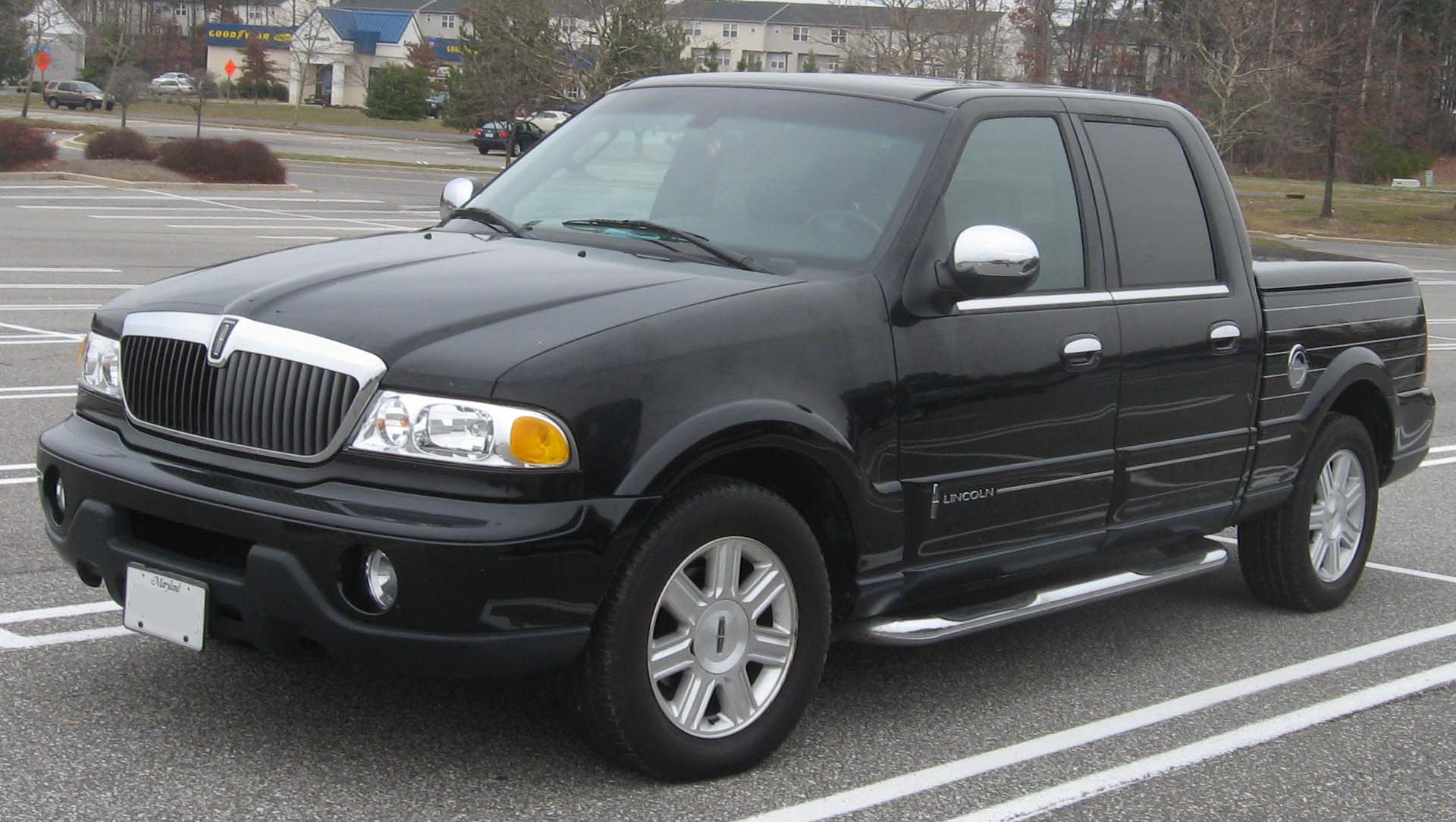
2002 Lincoln Blackwood

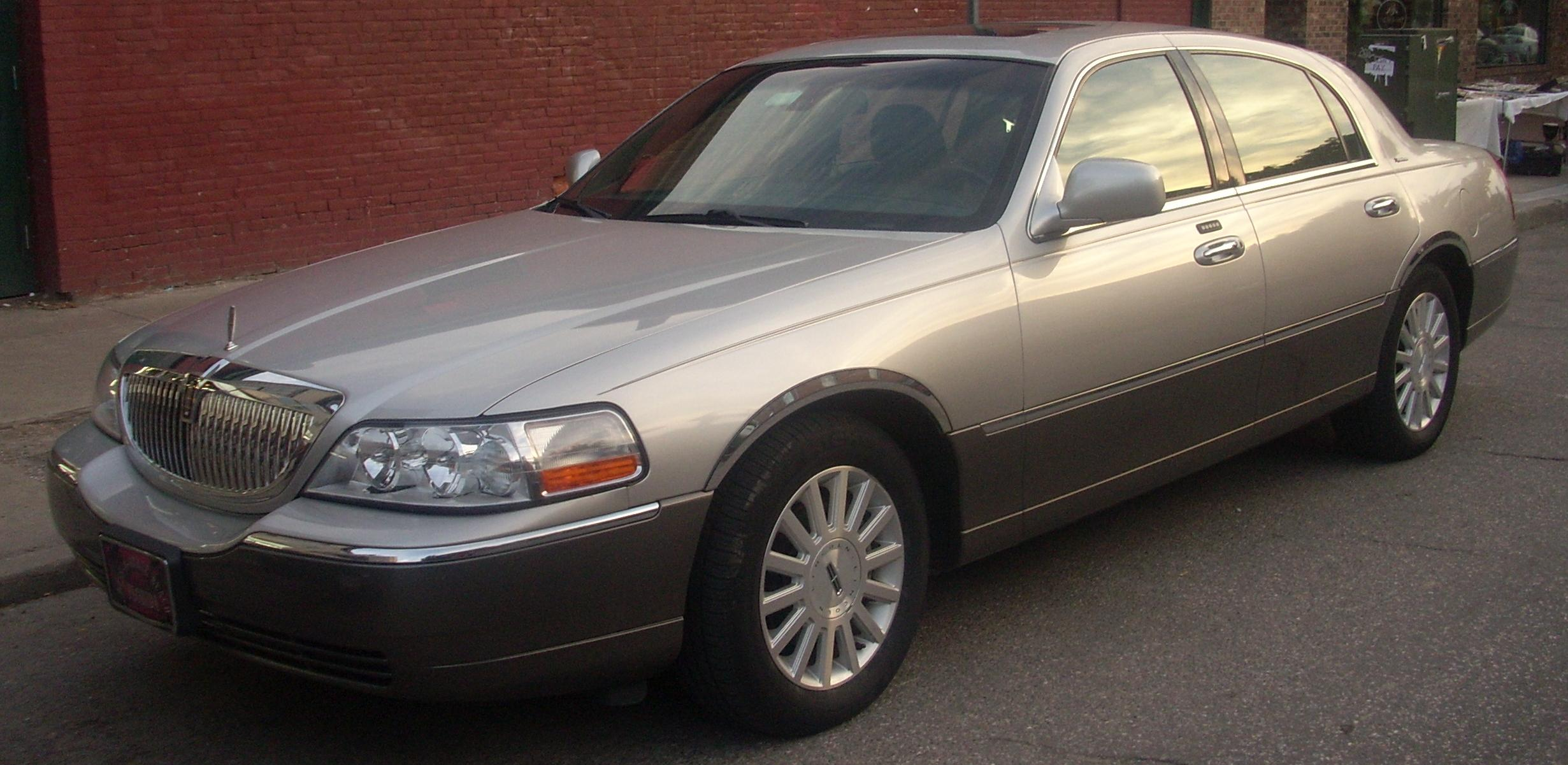
2003–2007 Lincoln Town Car Signature Series

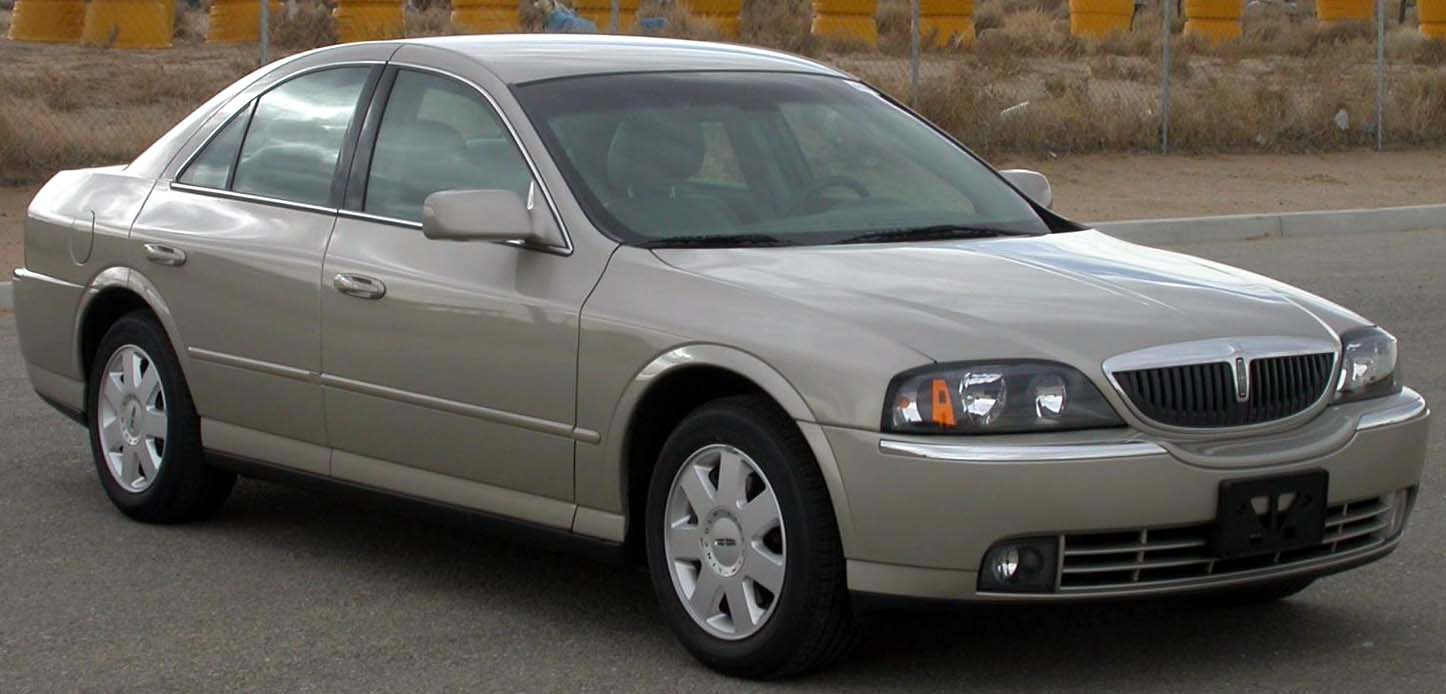
2004 Lincoln LS

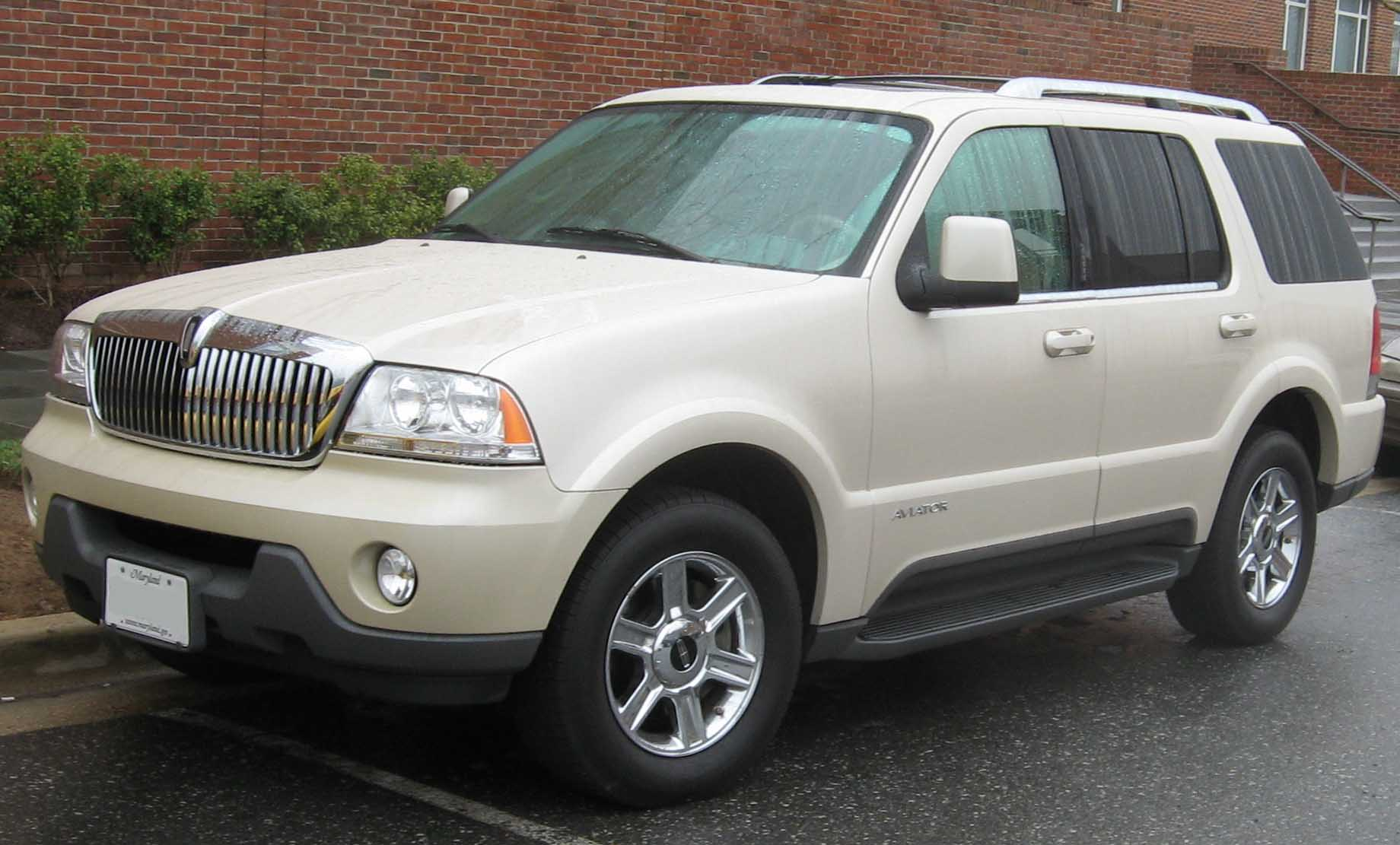
2003-2005 Lincoln Aviator

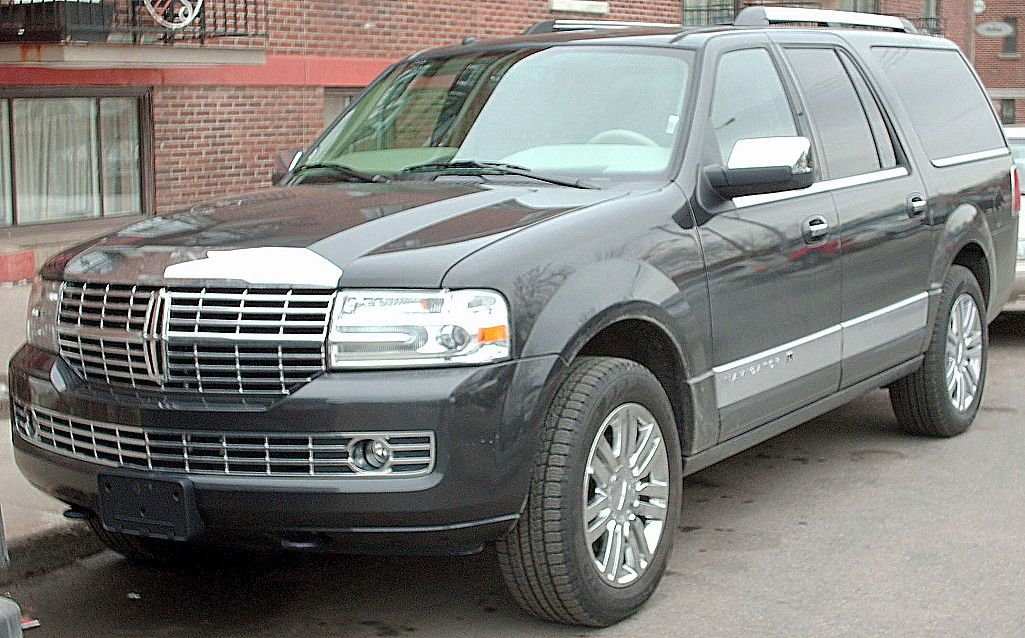
2007 Lincoln Navigator L

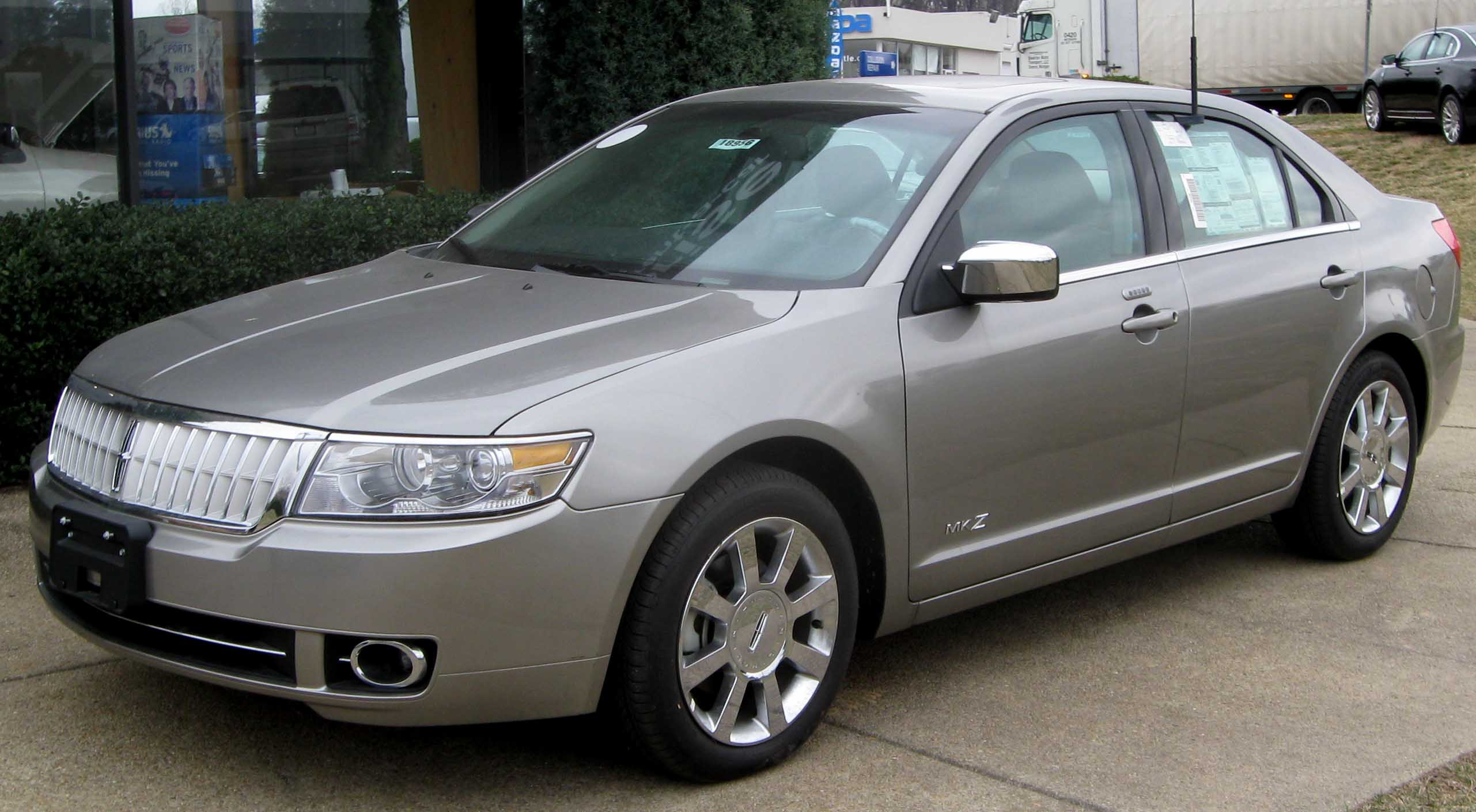
2009 Lincoln MKZ

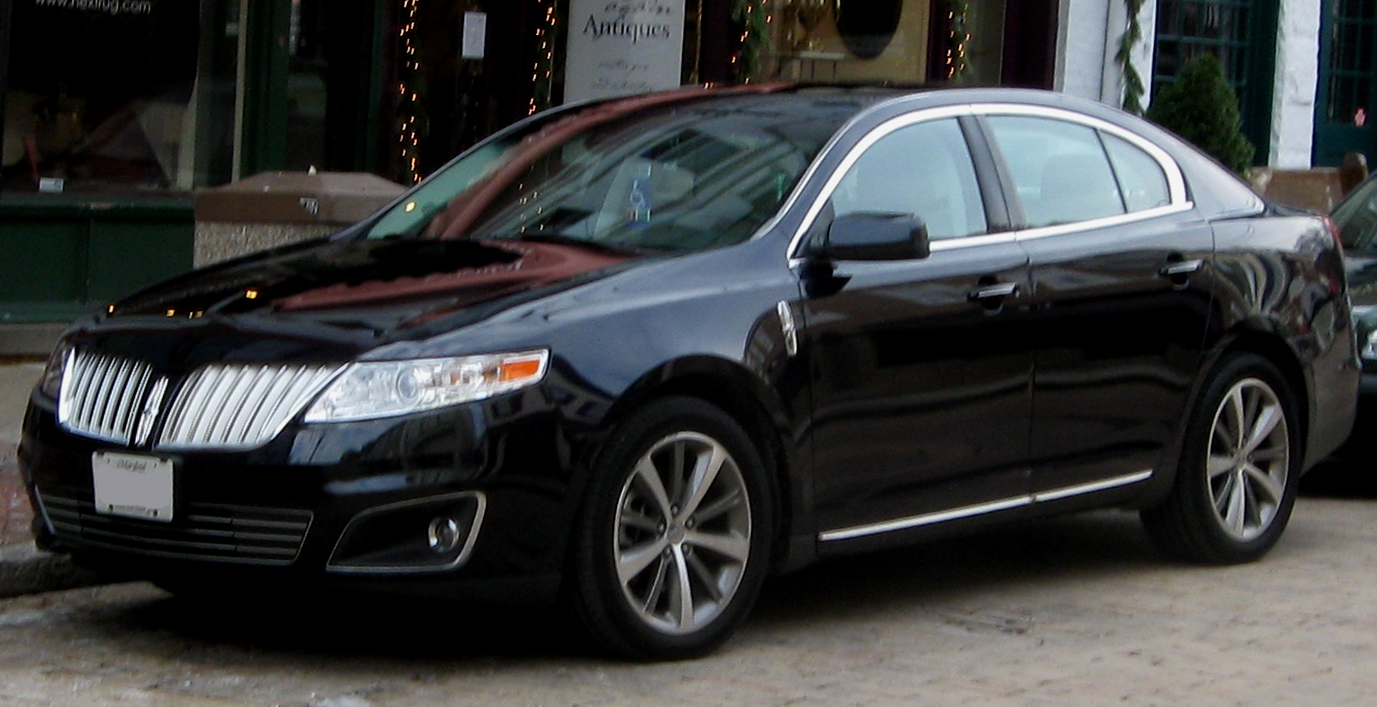
2009 Lincoln MKS

==== Premier Automotive Group & The Way Forward ====
As Lincoln entered the 21st century, the brand underwent a major transition within the structure of Ford Motor Company. As Ford expanded its global automotive holdings during the 1980s and 1990s, it acquired Jaguar, Aston Martin, Land Rover, and Volvo Cars. To collectively manage its global luxury-vehicle holdings, in 1999, Ford organized Premier Automotive Group (PAG). The same year, the management of Lincoln-Mercury was shifted to the American headquarters of PAG, largely in an effort to engineer and market more competitive vehicles for the brand.

The integration of Lincoln into PAG would lead to several product changes within the division. Following the 2000 debut of the LS sports sedan, the Lincoln Continental was withdrawn in 2002. To avoid the model overlap that plagued the division two decades before, Lincoln chose to focus production on the Lincoln Town Car, one of the highest-profit vehicles of Ford Motor Company. During 2002, as part of a change of management, Lincoln-Mercury was removed from PAG and relocated to Ford Motor Company headquarters.

In 2005, Ford developed The Way Forward restructuring plan in an effort to return to profitability. Among the seven vehicle assembly facilities slated for closure, Wixom Assembly (home to all Lincoln assembly since 1957, with the exception of the Versailles, Navigator, Blackwood, and Mark LT) was placed third, with an announced June 2007 closure. After a shortened 2006 model year, the Lincoln LS ended production. Initially slated for discontinuation after 2007, production of the Lincoln Town Car was shifted to St. Thomas Assembly in Ontario, consolidated with the Ford Crown Victoria and Mercury Grand Marquis. In 2011, all three vehicles ended production, coinciding with the closure of that facility.

=== 2010s ===
For the Lincoln division, the beginning of the 2010s introduced a number of structural changes. While Lincoln and Mercury were spared by The Way Forward, in 2010, Ford announced the closure of Mercury at the end of the year, with the final Mercury vehicle produced on January 4, 2011. After 30 years of production as a distinct model line (and 41 years as a Lincoln nameplate), the Lincoln Town Car ended its production run in 2011, coinciding with the closure of the St. Thomas Assembly in Ontario. In contrast to the V8-engined Lincoln Town Car, for 2011, Lincoln introduced the MKZ Hybrid, a counterpart of the Ford Fusion Hybrid. The first Lincoln hybrid vehicle, the MKZ Hybrid was the first Lincoln equipped with a four-cylinder engine. Following the discontinuation of the Town Car sedan, Lincoln continued the use of the Town Car nameplate, adding it to limousine and livery variants of the Lincoln MKT. Along with chassis modifications for heavy-duty use, the MKT Town Car features modified rear seating, with the third-row seat removed to create additional luggage space and second-row seat legroom.

To reflect the end of the Lincoln-Mercury division pairing (from 1945 to 2010), in December 2012, the formal name of Lincoln was changed to The Lincoln Motor Company (its name prior to 1940). To help differentiate Lincoln vehicles from Ford counterparts, Ford established separate design, product development, and sales teams for Lincoln. In a marketing shift, Lincoln began to target "progressive luxury customers", buyers who sought luxury without ostentation.

As part of the 2012 rebranding, for 2013, the Lincoln model line underwent several design revisions, headed by the release of the second-generation MKZ. Retaining commonality with the second-generation Ford Fusion, the MKZ adapted a distinct exterior from its Fusion counterparts (nearly unchanged from a Lincoln concept car released in 2012). The MKS and MKT underwent exterior and interior revisions, adopting the "bow-wing" grille design of the MKZ. Also during this time, Lincoln introduced new trim level nomenclatures Premiere, Select, and Reserve on the MKZ. The use of these trim names would eventually be expanded to other Lincoln models.

In 2014, Lincoln enlisted Matthew McConaughey as a brand spokesman; McConaughey has appeared in commercials for several Lincoln products in the years since.

For 2015, Lincoln introduced two new SUVs, with the all-new Lincoln MKC compact crossover SUV (derived from the Ford Kuga/Ford Escape) becoming the first Lincoln produced solely with four-cylinder engines. The Lincoln Navigator underwent an extensive revision, largely to preview buyers of its 2018 redesign. Along with extensive exterior and interior updates, the Navigator adopted the 3.5 L twin-turbocharged V6 of the Ford F-150 as its standard engine, becoming the first version of the Navigator offered without a V8 engine.

Following the positive reception to a 2015 concept car of the same name, Lincoln revived the Lincoln Continental nameplate for the 2017 model year (after a 15-year hiatus). Slotted as a replacement for the Lincoln MKS, the Continental was adapted from a version of the Ford Taurus designed for China. While slightly shorter than the MKS, the Continental is the longest-wheelbase Lincoln since the Town Car. The revived model line introduced a new design language for Lincoln; shifting away from the split-wing grille, the Continental introduced a recessed rectangular grille. The revived Continental marked the debut of the Lincoln "Black Label" program for all Lincoln vehicles. As a flagship trim line, Black Label vehicles feature specially coordinated exterior and interior design themes (similar to the Designer Editions of the Mark series), along with highly personalized customer service.

For 2018, after an eleven-year production run of its predecessor, Lincoln released the fourth generation of the Navigator. Integrating the recessed rectangular grille of the Continental into its exterior, the Navigator is distinguished from the Ford Expedition largely from its taillamps and its blacked-out roof pillars (sharing the "floating roof" design of the Ford Flex and Ford Explorer). At a base price of $95,000, the Lincoln Navigator L Black Label is the most expensive vehicle ever sold by the Ford Motor Company (with the exception of the Ford GT supercars). The Lincoln MKZ underwent a mid-cycle redesign, adopting the grille design and twin-turbocharged V6 engine of the Lincoln Continental.

For 2019, the retirement of the "MK" naming scheme was expanded, as the MKX underwent a mid-cycle update, becoming the Lincoln Nautilus.

To commemorate the 80th anniversary of the Continental nameplate, Lincoln unveiled the 80th Anniversary Coach Door Edition. The wheelbase featured a 6-inch stretch to provide more rear passenger room along with longer roof, rear doors, and rear windows. The variant also marked the revival of the rear-hinged door configuration (after a 40-year absence). Cabot Coach Builders of Massachusetts provided stretch as well as rear door and interior conversion. A total of 80 units were made for 2019, but a 2020 version of the Continental Coach Door Edition was also available. The Coach Door variant is otherwise similar to the Continental's Black Label trim level with a twin-turbocharged 3.0 L V6 with four-wheel drive.

The MKT (including the MKT Town Car livery version) was discontinued in 2019, marking the final use of the Town Car nameplate.

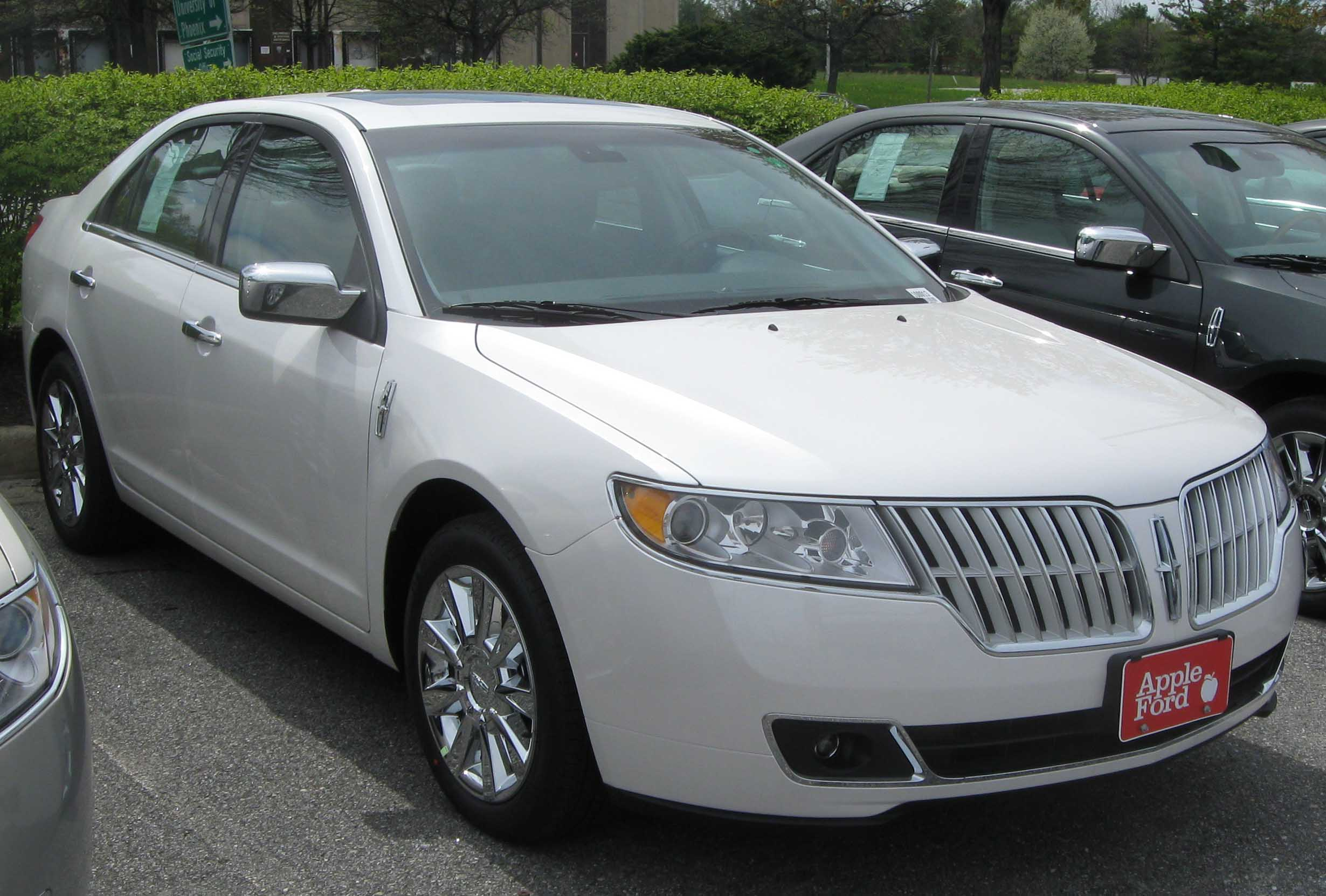
2010 Lincoln MKZ, 1st Gen

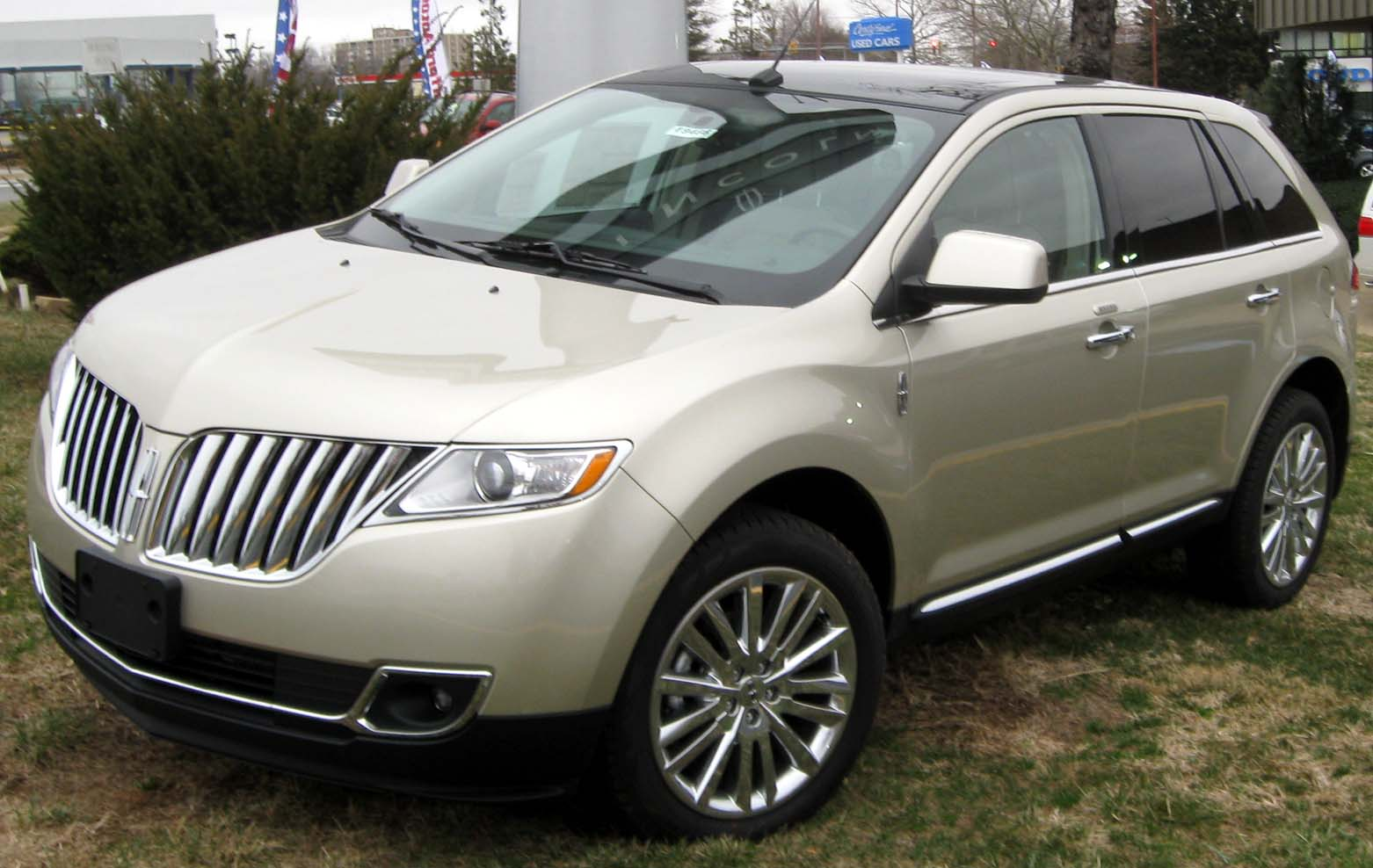
2011 Lincoln MKX

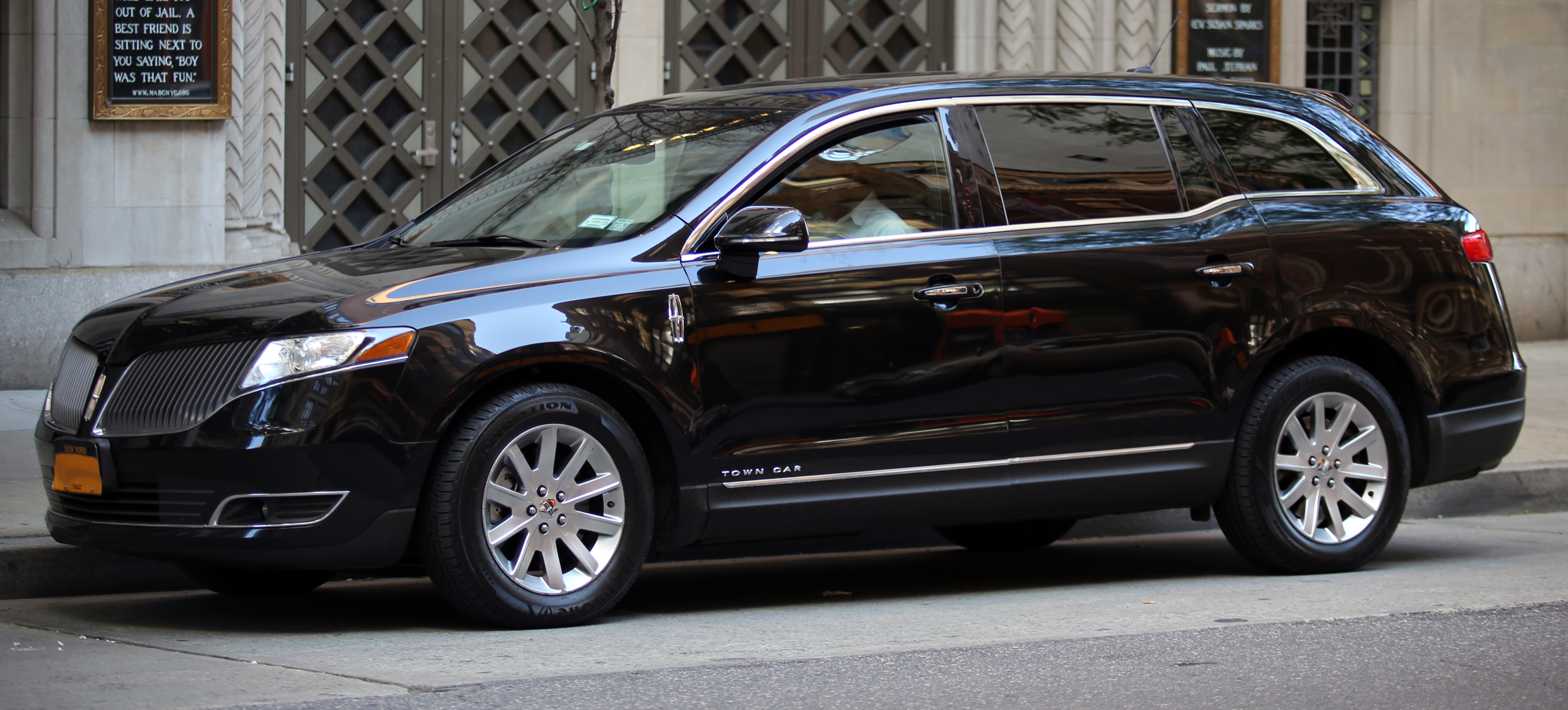
2013 Lincoln MKT Town Car

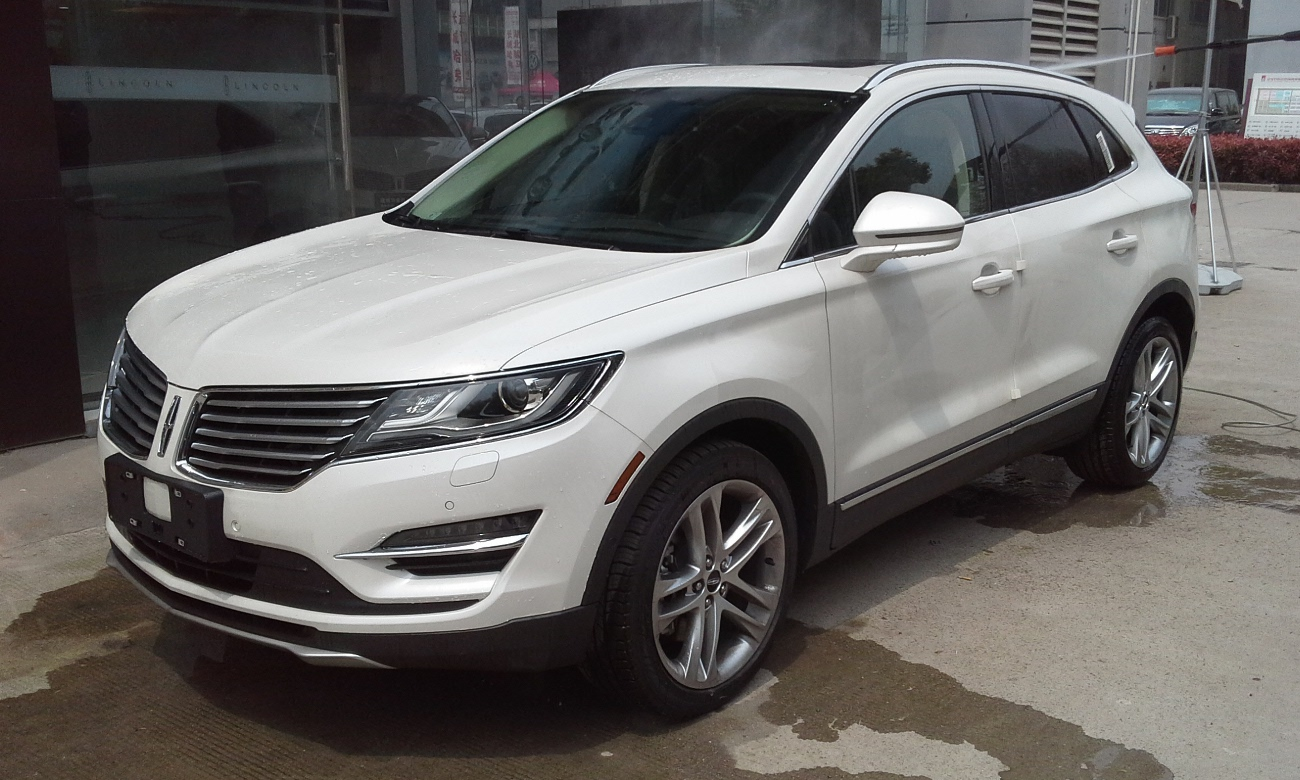
2015 Lincoln MKC

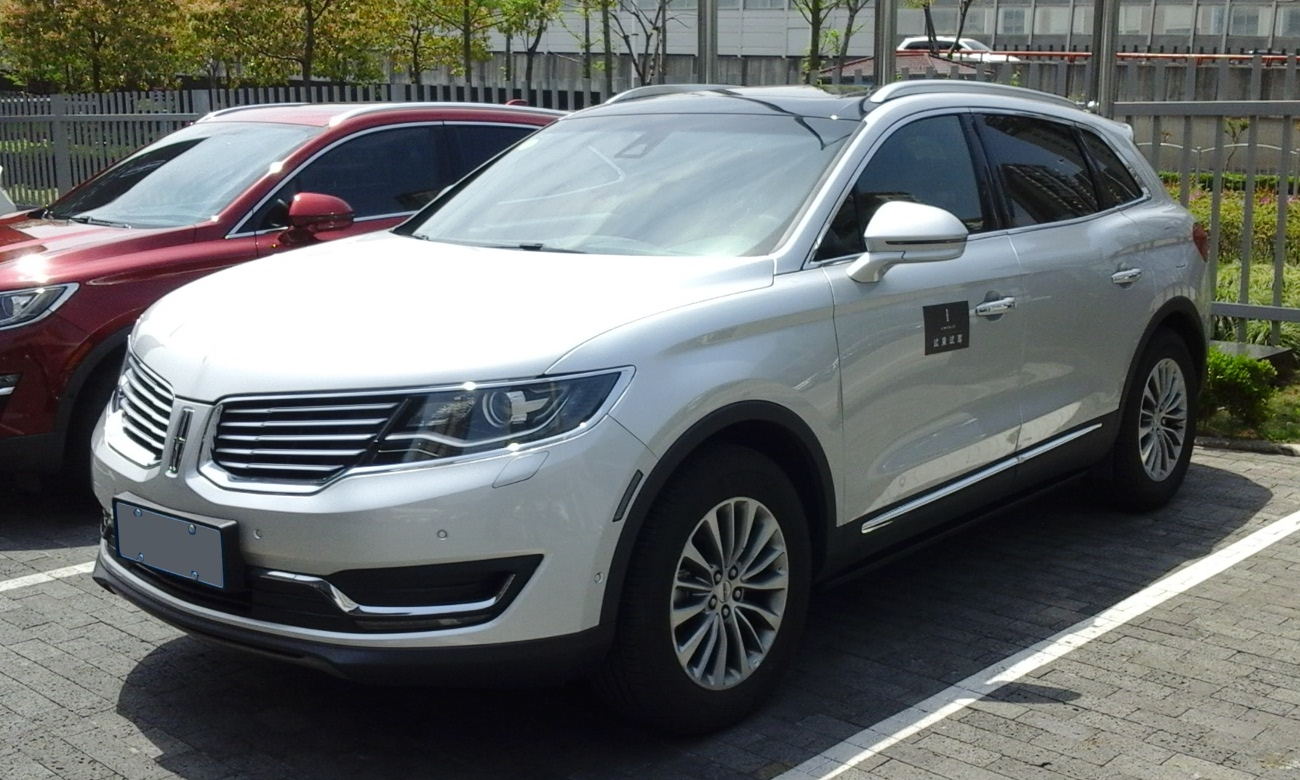
2016 Lincoln MKX

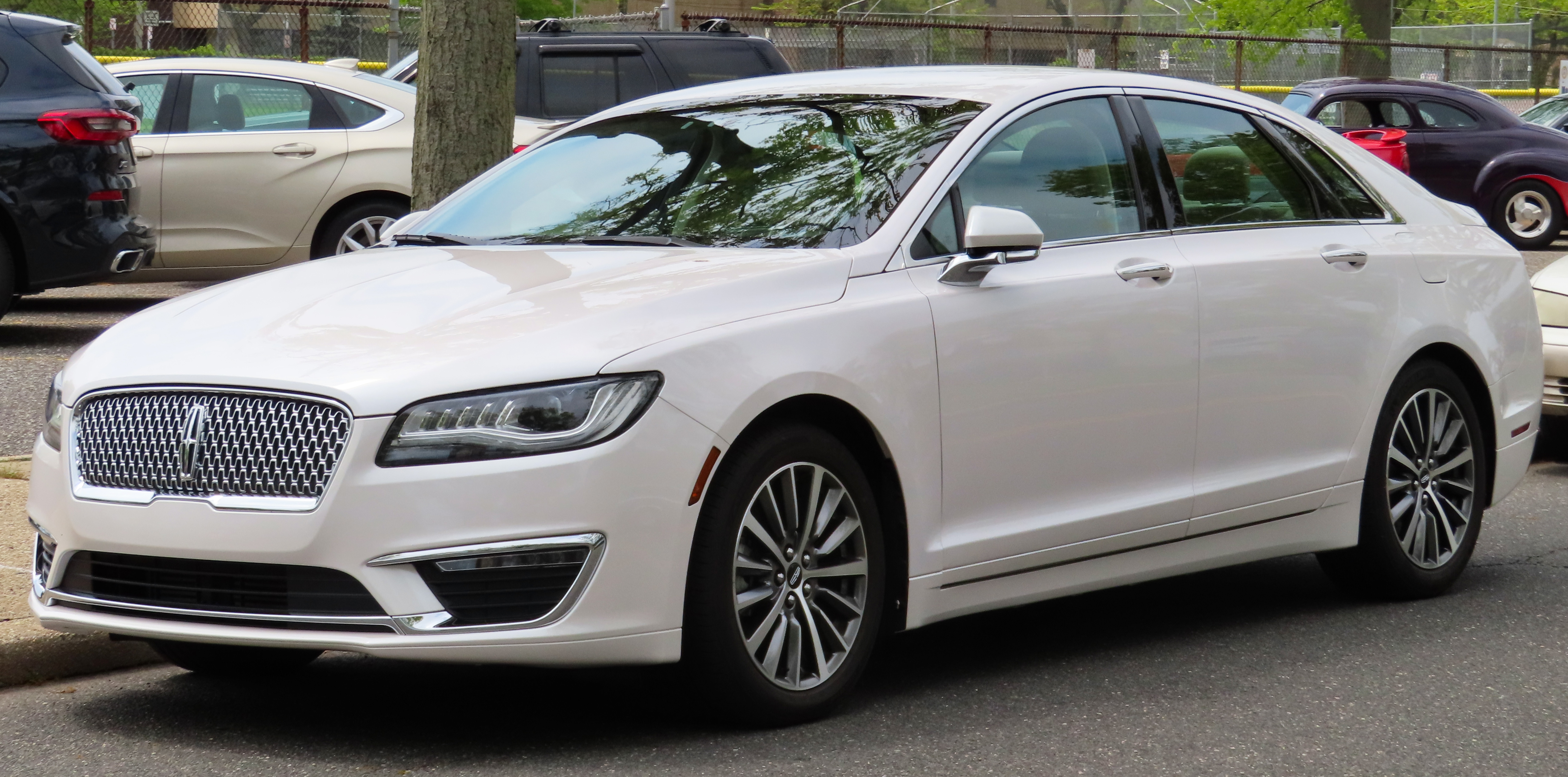
2017 Lincoln MKZ, 2nd Gen

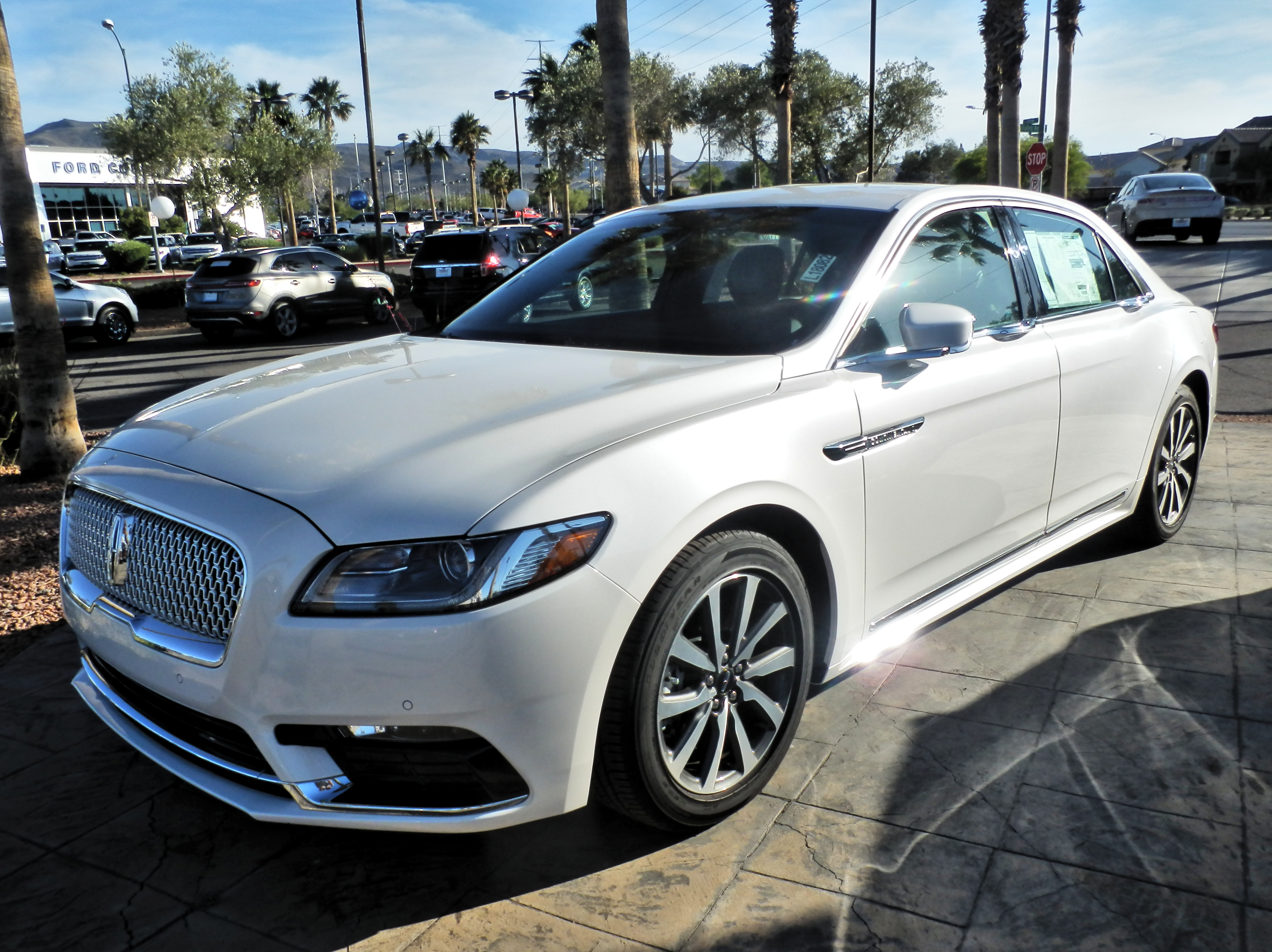
2018 Lincoln Continental

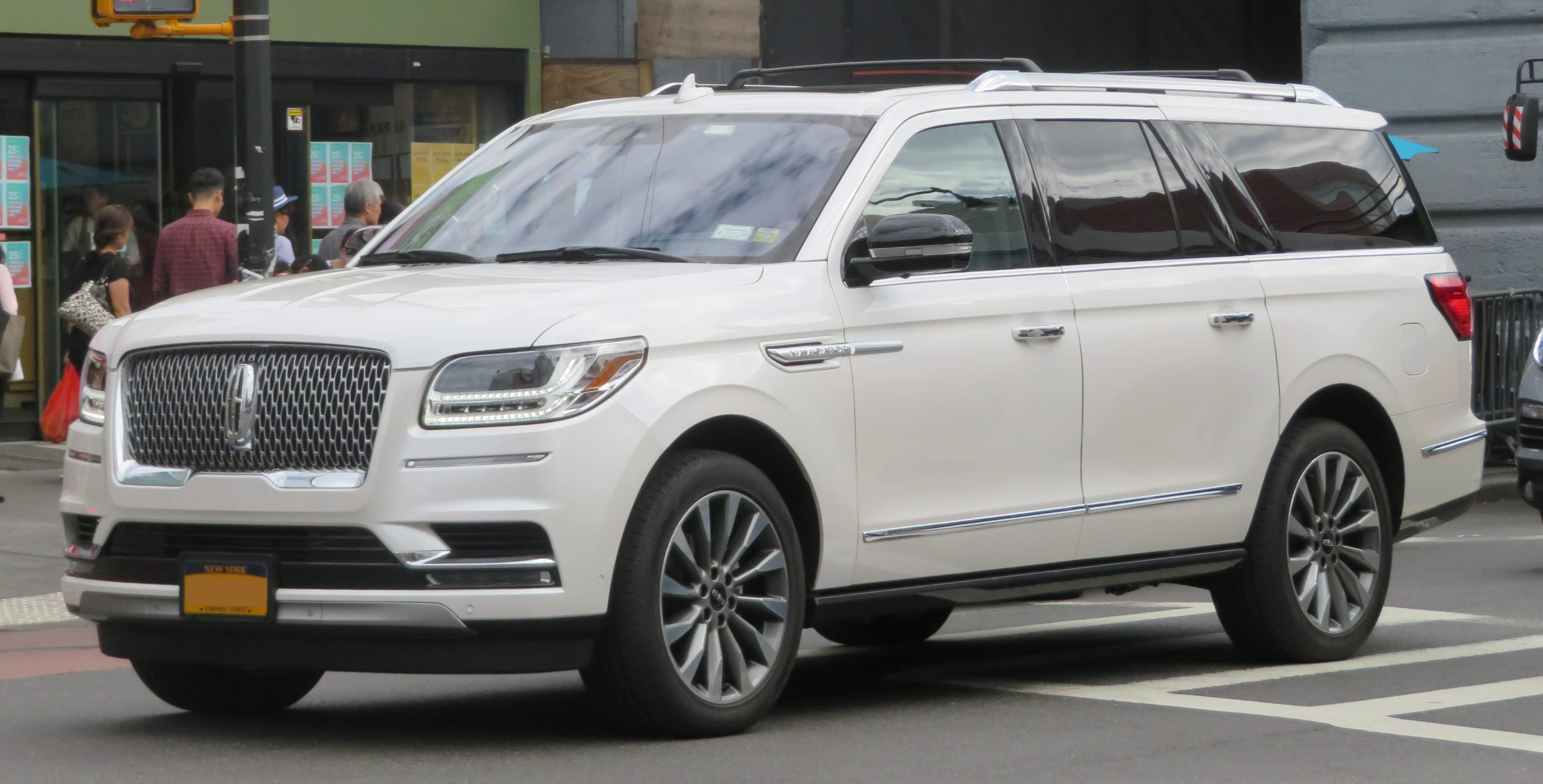
2018 Lincoln Navigator L Black Label

=== 2020s ===
For 2020, the Lincoln model line underwent further expansion, with the return of the Aviator mid-size SUV (again a counterpart of the Ford Explorer); the revived Aviator offers the first hybrid-electric system in a Lincoln SUV. The long-wheelbase coach-door Continental is now offered as a regular production model only in Black Label trim. The MKC was replaced by the Lincoln Corsair, remaining a counterpart of the Ford Escape/Kuga. Also in 2020, Lincoln announced that it was ending production of the Continental and MKZ sedans by end of the year due to the popularity of SUVs.

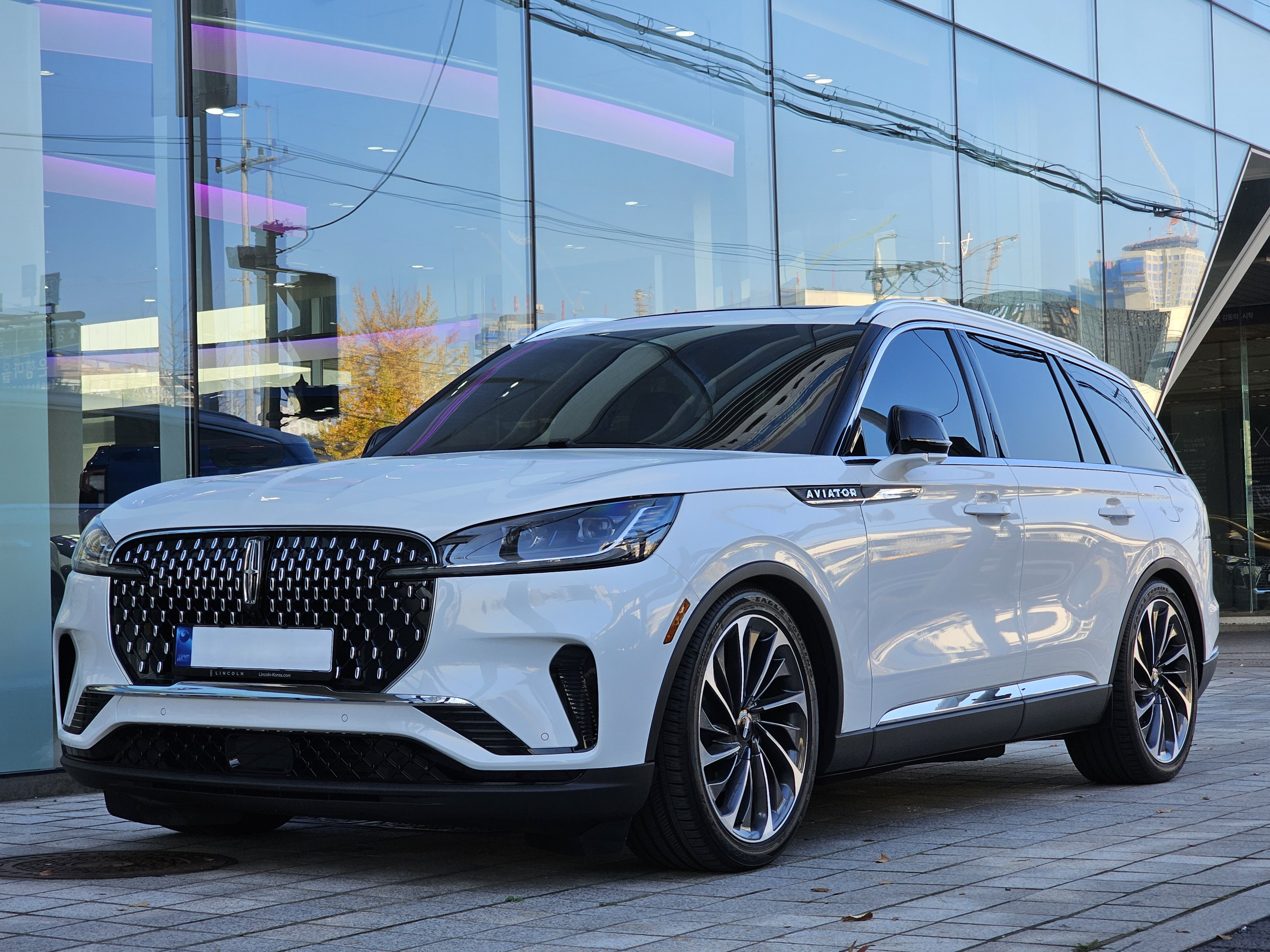
Lincoln Aviator

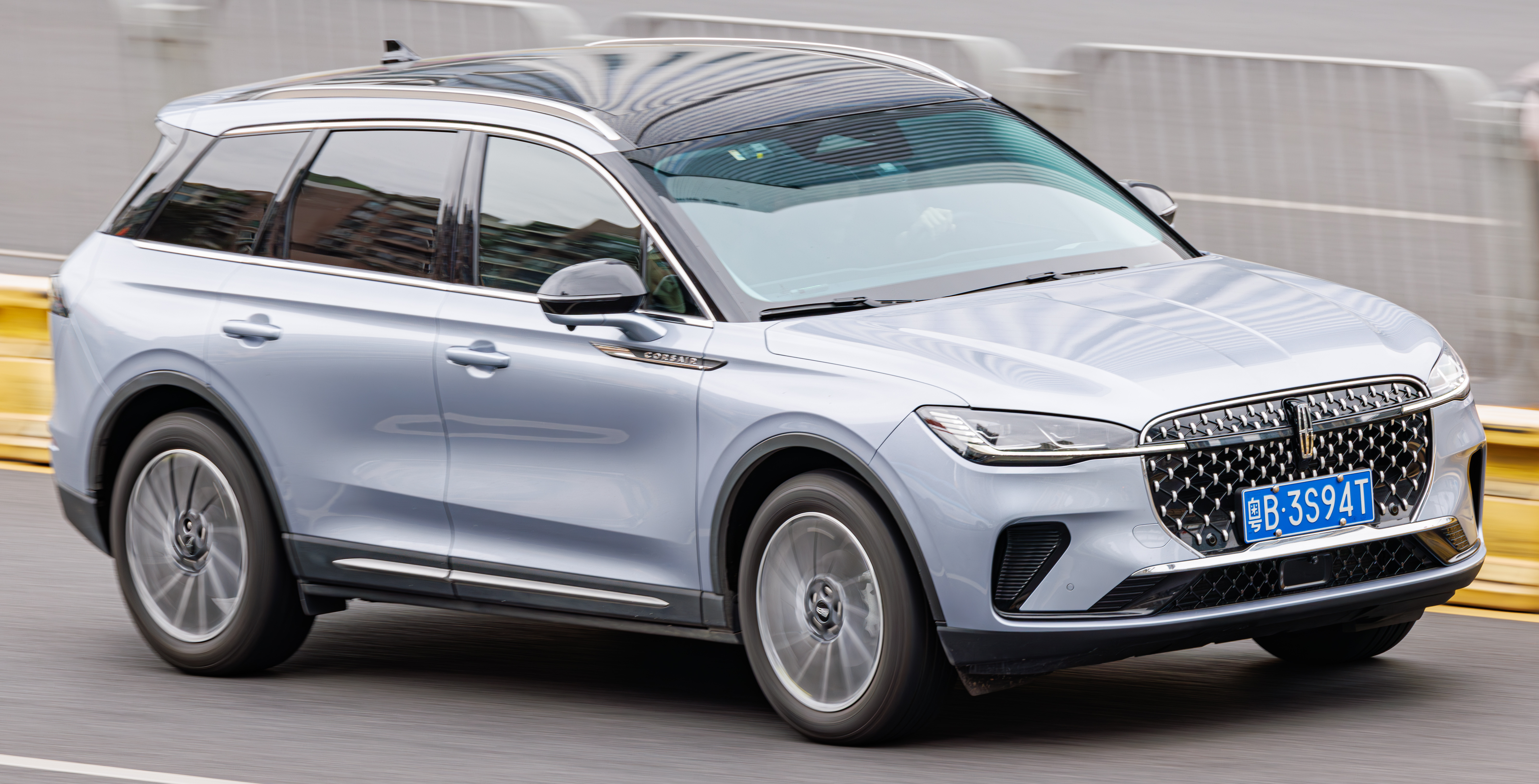
Lincoln Corsair

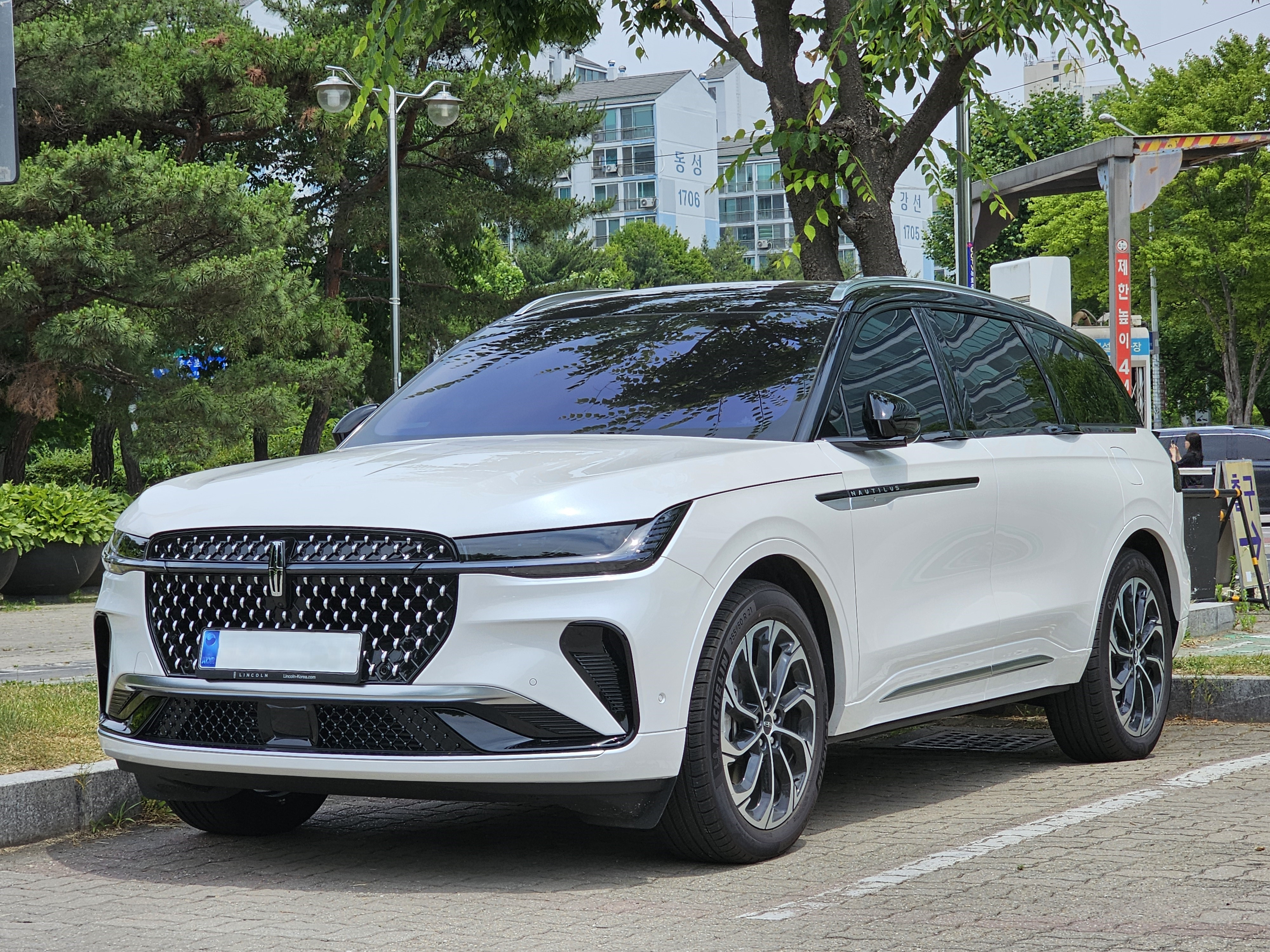
Lincoln Nautilus

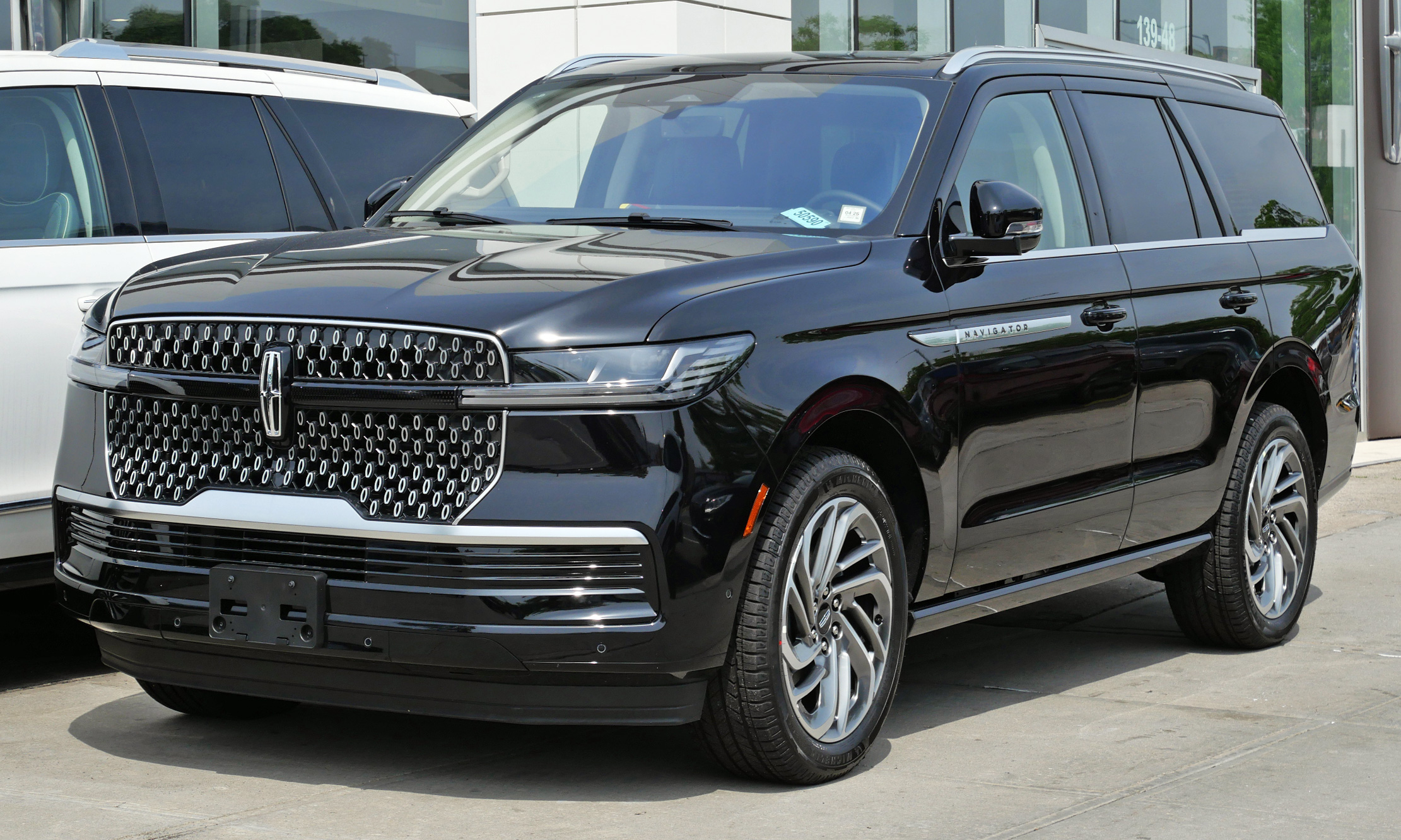
Lincoln Navigator

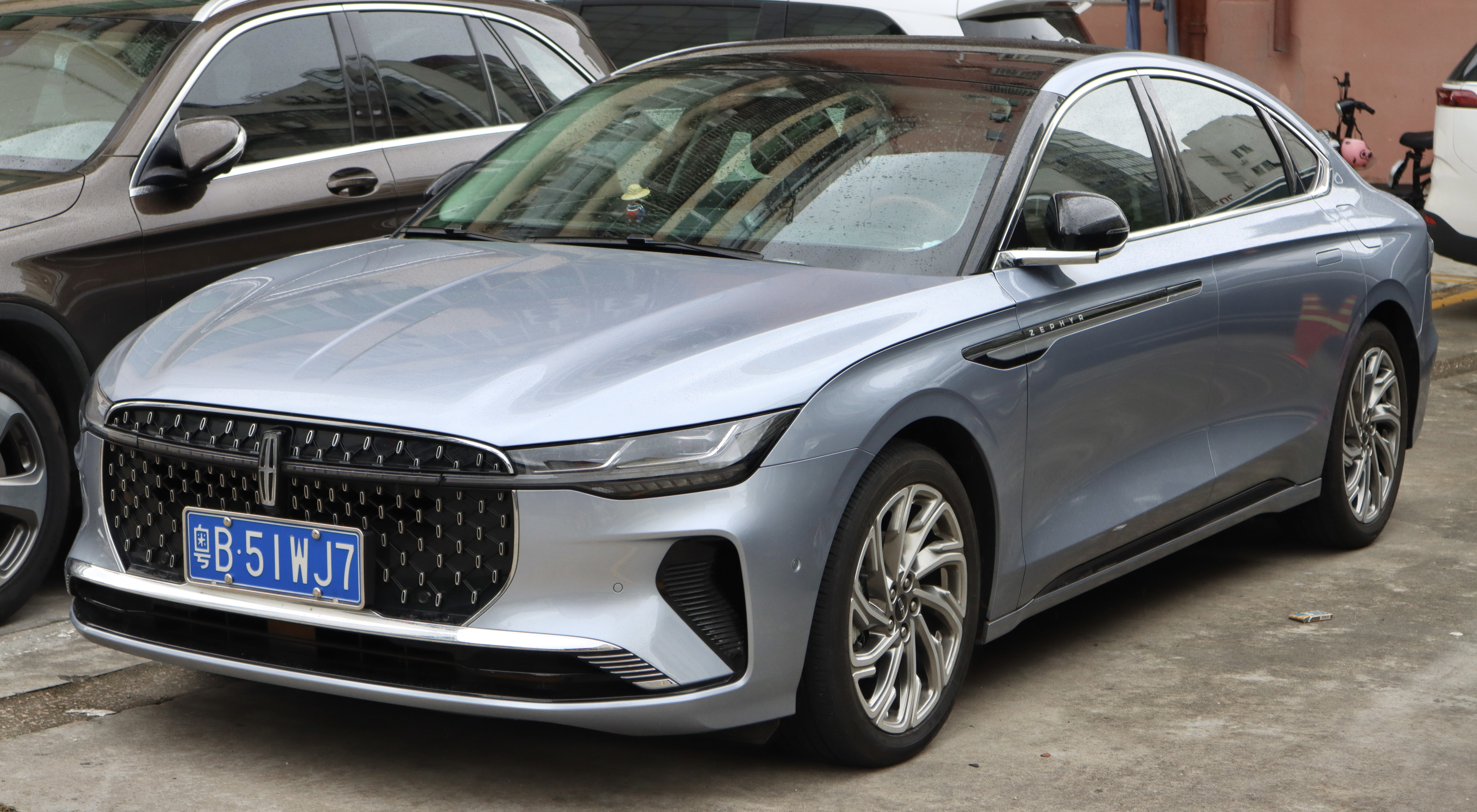
Lincoln Z

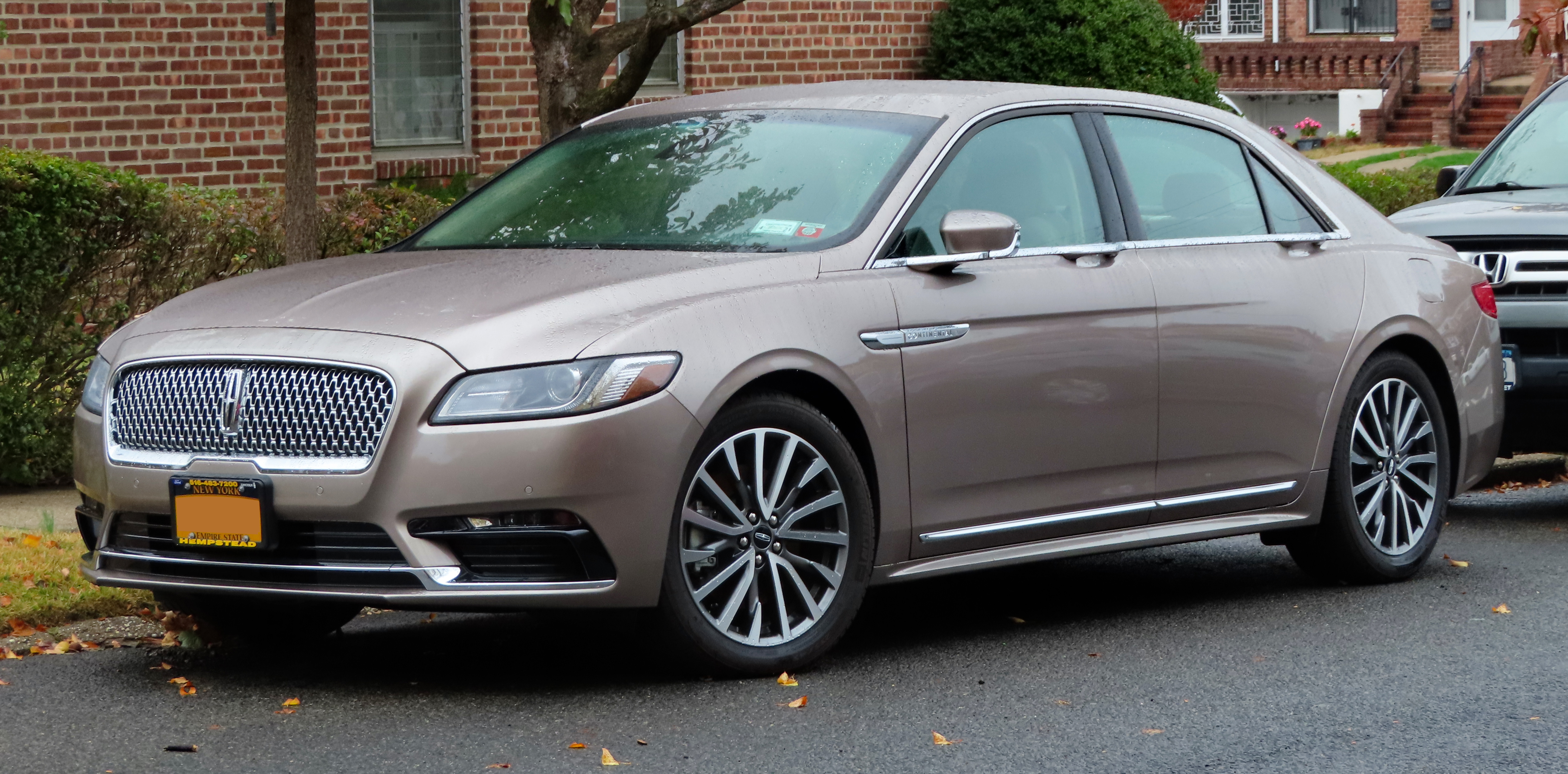
Lincoln Continental

== Worldwide distribution ==
The home market of the Lincoln Motor Company brand is the United States, Canada, and Mexico. Around the world, Ford Motor Company has used Lincoln in various markets as a flagship brand while using the Ford brand across its entire product line for other regions.

=== Asia ===
In Japan, Lincoln was marketed alongside Ford through 2016, when Ford ended its operations in the country.

In South Korea, the Lincoln product line continues to be offered. Previously excluded from the region, the Lincoln Navigator was introduced to the country for the 2022 model year.

==== Australia & New Zealand ====
Ford Australia has never marketed the Lincoln brand; to market vehicles in the premium/luxury segment, variants of Australian-designed and manufactured vehicles were marketed under the Ford brand (the Ford Fairlane and LTD; the Ford Fairmont served a role similar to Mercury) through Australia and New Zealand.

==== China ====
In the 1990s and 2000s, Hongqi (in an effort to develop a successor to the Hongqi CA770 limousine) began production of a license-built variant of the Lincoln Town Car, using knock-down kits imported from the United States. The Town Car CKD kits received an exterior restyling, fitted with different front fenders, headlamps and taillamps, and a new grille. Along with a standard-wheelbase sedan, three lengths of limousines were produced, along with the Hongqi CA7400 prototype.

In 2014, Ford Motor Company brought Lincoln to the Chinese market, introducing the brand with the mid-size MKZ sedan and MKC small SUV. By the end of 2016, Lincoln intended to establish a network of 60 dealerships in 50 cities, selling the MKZ, Continental, MKC, MKX, and Navigator. 2016 sales increased 180% over the previous year, with Lincoln planning to produce vehicles in China by 2019. To attract Chinese consumers, Lincoln introduced "The Lincoln Way", a car purchase and ownership model which provides highly personalized services to customers.

On March 29, 2020, the first Lincoln made in China (a Lincoln Corsair) was produced by Chang'an Ford at its facility in Chongqing. In 2022, a new Zephyr sedan built only for the Chinese market replaced the discontinued MKZ.

=== Europe ===
Ford of Europe does not market the Lincoln brand. To compete against luxury-brand automobiles, the Italian coachbuilder Vignale (acquired by Ford in 1973) is marketed by Ford of Europe as a sub-brand as the highest trim of the Fiesta, Focus, Mondeo, Kuga, Edge, and S-Max.

=== Middle East ===
Ford markets the Lincoln brand in several Middle East countries, including Saudi Arabia, United Arab Emirates, Qatar, Oman, Kuwait, and Bahrain.

== Leadership ==
- Kumar Galhotra (2014–2018)
- Joy Falotico (2018–2022)
- Dianne Craig (2022–2025)
- Joaquin Nuño-Whelan (2025–present)

== Sales ==
Lincoln achieved its two best U.S. sales years to date in 1989 (200,315) and 1990 (231,660). This followed the redesign of the Continental for 1988 and the Town Car for 1990.

In 2025, Lincoln sold 106,868 vehicles in the U.S. and 69,864 vehicles in China.

== Branding history ==
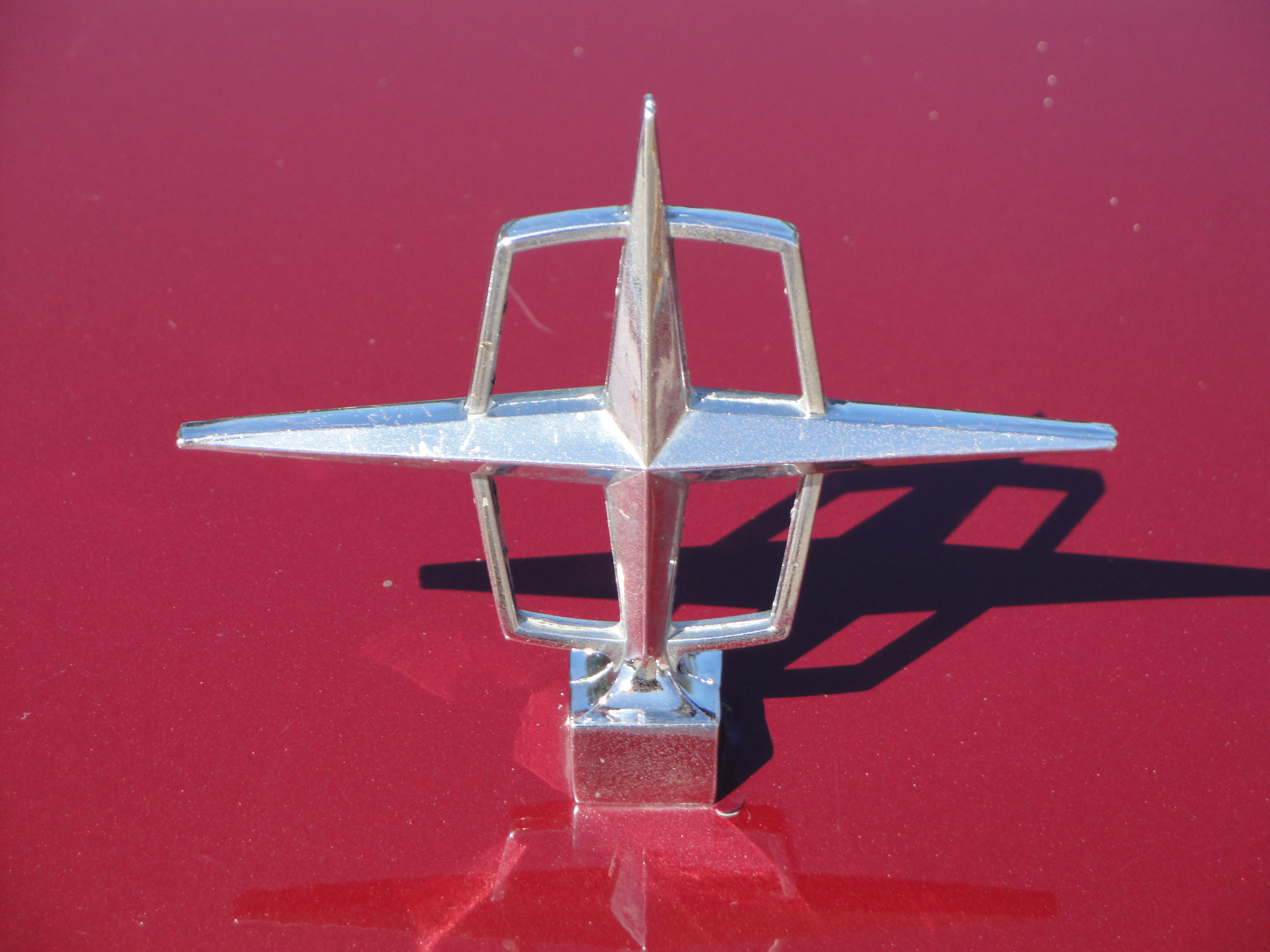
Hood ornament, Continental Mark II

In 1927, Lincoln adopted a greyhound as a hood ornament, used into the 1930s. As a replacement for the greyhound, Lincoln adopted a knight's helmet hood ornament, used before World War II. On the front fascia, Lincoln adopted a coat of arms with a cross integrating the knight's helmet. The coat of arms continued use through 1956. The Lincoln Premier was introduced for 1956 featuring its own eight-point star which was adapted for all Lincoln models for 1957. From that time, Lincoln branded models used the eight-point star emblem until the end of the 1960 model year.

Introduced on the Continental Mark II for 1956, the boxed four-point "Continental star" emblem was used exclusively on Continental branded vehicles through 1960. When the Continental brand transitioned to become a sole Lincoln model line for 1961, the Lincoln eight-point star was discontinued as the "Continental star" took over for the Lincoln brand since there was only the Continental. The introduction of the 1977 Lincoln Versailles marks the first use of the "Continental star" emblem on a vehicle that was not branded a Continental. The emblem underwent various modifications in appearance over the years remaining nearly unchanged since 1980. Since 2018, an illuminated version of the front grille badge has been offered as an option.

=== Mark series (1968–1998) ===
Intended as a successor of the 1956–1957 Continental Mark II personal luxury car, the Continental Mark III was the first generation of the revived Continental Mark series. Marketed as personal luxury cars, the Mark series served as the flagship of the entire Ford Motor Company range. Though marketed and serviced through the Lincoln-Mercury dealer network, Mark series vehicles did not carry Lincoln badging (with the exception of the four-point star badge, itself inherited from the Continental Mark II), with Ford officially using Continental as the brand name (later used for 1981–1985 Mark-series VINs).

For 1986, the Continental Mark VII was renamed the Lincoln Mark VII in an effort to end nomenclature and advertising confusion over the model line. The successor 1993–1998 Mark VIII would use the Lincoln brand name throughout its entire production.

Along with serving as a flagship model line, the Mark series offered Designer Edition option packages for the 1976 Mark IV. In 1982, Lincoln introduced its first Designer Edition vehicle, offering a Cartier Edition Town Car, offering the option through 2003. The feature of design-coordinated interiors and exteriors made their return in 2017 with the introduction of its flagship Black Label trim series.

=== Slogans ===
- Travel well
- The Final Step Up (The Continentals, 1968–1971)
- What a luxury car should be
- American luxury
- Smarter than luxury (2010)
- Quiet flight (2018)

== Current model line ==
Model	Category	Years
Lincoln Navigator	Full-size SUV	1998–present
Lincoln Aviator	Mid-size three-row crossover SUV	2020–present
Lincoln Nautilus	Mid-size two-row crossover SUV	2019–present
Lincoln Corsair	Compact crossover SUV	2020–present
Lincoln Z	Sedan	2022–present

== Motorsport ==
Like all American brands of the 1950s, Lincoln participated in NASCAR's Grand National Stock Car series, winning the first race in that series. Lincolns were campaigned in NASCAR through 1953.

The Continental Mark VII was raced in the Trans-Am Series in 1984 and 1985 without success, with the best result being a ninth-place finish at the 1984 Watkins Glen Trans-Am race.

In 1992, a Lincoln Mark VIII prototype was built as a land speed record car, setting the top speed record for a stock car with an engine under 5 liters at 182 mph (293 km/h).

The Mark VIII was tested at Charlotte Motor Speedway in 1996 as a potential replacement for the discontinued Ford Thunderbird, but the car was rejected by NASCAR due to a lack of wind tunnel testing and not getting the serial numbers of the parts to ensure they were stock components, as well as Ford not wanting to give Lincoln, traditionally a luxury brand, a racing image; Ford ultimately replaced the Thunderbird with the Ford Taurus.

== Presidential state cars ==
From 1939 to 1993, Lincolns were included as official state limousines for Presidents of the United States, from Franklin D. Roosevelt to George H. W. Bush. Along with producing the first purpose-built presidential limousine, Lincoln produced the first armored vehicles for presidential use.

Vehicle	Base vehicle	Years in service	Body style	Presidential service	On display	Notes
Sunshine Special (1939)	1939 Lincoln Model K 414 cubic-inch V12	1939-1950	4-door convertible (Coachwork by Brunn)	Franklin D. Roosevelt Harry Truman	Henry Ford Museum(Dearborn, Michigan)	Underwent security and safety modifications in 1942, becoming first armored presidential vehicle. Restyled with 1942 Lincoln front fascia. First presidential limousine to travel outside the United States (1945).
Lincoln Cosmopolitan fleet 1950 Lincoln Cosmopolitan "Bubble Top" convertible	1950 Lincoln Cosmopolitan 337 cubic-inch V8	1950-1965	9x 4-door sedans 1x 4-door convertible (Coachwork by Henney Motor Company, Security upgrades by Hess & Eisenhardt)	Harry Truman Dwight D. Eisenhower John F. Kennedy Lyndon B. Johnson	Henry Ford Museum(Dearborn, Michigan)	Fleet of vehicles leased, bodied with extended wheelbases and higher-headroom roofs Convertible was fitted with a removable Plexiglas roof in 1954, taking on a "Bubble Top" nickname" Used once by Lyndon B. Johnson.
SS-100-X/100X	1961 Lincoln Continental 430 cubic-inch V8	1961-1963 (original configuration) 1965-1967 (redesign)	4-door open car (1961) 4-door limousine sedan (1965 configuration) Coachwork by Hess & Eisenhardt (both configurations)	John F. Kennedy Lyndon B. Johnson	Henry Ford Museum(Dearborn, Michigan)	In its 1961 configuration, the limousine was designed as an open car with a series of interchangeable tops, including a stainless-steel Targa top above the driver's compartment and either a black formal-profile roof or a series of Plexiglass rear top sections (similar to its "Bubble Top" predecessor"). Extended in length 3 feet over a standard Continental, adding a middle row of jump seats, along with heavy-duty heating and air conditioning. Following the 1963 Kennedy assassination, SS-100-X was dismantled and remanufactured at a cost of over $500,000. The open-car configuration was replaced by a fixed roof and the vehicle received armor plating and bulletproof glass. In what remains a tradition among U.S. presidential state cars, SS-100-X was painted black. Retired from front-line service in 1967, the vehicle remained in occasional use through 1977.
1965, 1968 Lincoln Continental Executive Limousines 1968 Lincoln Continental stretch limousine	1965 Lincoln Continental 430 cubic-inch V8 1968 Lincoln Continental 462 cubic-inch V8	1965-1969	4-door stretch limousine (Coachwork by Lehmann-Peterson)	Lyndon B. Johnson	Lyndon Baines Johnson Library and Museum(Austin, Texas) (1968 car)	Three 1965 Lincoln Continental Executive Limousines (one used by Robert McNamara) were placed into service alongside a 1968 Lincoln Continental Executive Limousine, alongside SS-100-X. The latter was used primarily at his Texas home. Though upgraded with upgraded communications equipment, the vehicles did not include upgraded security features.
1969 Lincoln Continental 1969 Lincoln Continental limousine	1969 Lincoln Continental 460 cubic-inch V8	1969-1974	4-door stretch limousine (Coachwork by Lehmann-Peterson)	Richard M. Nixon	Nixon Library (Yorba Linda, California)	In contrast to the 1961/1965 SS-100-X, the 1969 Lincoln Continental commissioned for the Nixon administration was developed originally as a closed car (it has a roofline closer in height to the standard Lincoln Continental). Sharing many of the security features of its predecessor, the 1969 vehicle was fitted with a roof opening (so Nixon could stand up to greet the crowd from the motorcade).
1972 Lincoln Continental 1972 Lincoln Continental limousine (showing 1978 facelift)	1972 Lincoln Continental 460 cubic-inch V8	1974-1992	4-door stretch limousine (Coachwork by Ford Motor Company)	Gerald Ford Jimmy Carter Ronald Reagan George H.W. Bush	Henry Ford Museum(Dearborn, Michigan)	Constructed by Ford Motor Company, the 1972 Continental is the longest-serving Presidential State Car. Again fitted with full body armor and bulletproof glass, the vehicle was again fitted with a roof opening allowing the President to stand through; this would be the final Presidential limousine so fitted. Played a role in protecting Presidents Ford and Reagan during 1975 assassination attempt and 1981 assassination attempt, respectively. Following the latter, the car underwent an interior and exterior refurbishment (styled with the fascias of a 1979 Continental).
1989 Lincoln Town Car Presidential Limousine 1989 Lincoln Town Car state limousine	1989 Lincoln Town Car 7.5L V8	1989-1993	4-door stretch limousine	George H.W. Bush	George Bush Presidential Library(College Station, Texas)	The first Lincoln since the 1950 Cosmopolitans that is not a Continental, the 1989 Lincoln Town Car is again a fully armored stretch limousine. Replacing a 1983 Cadillac, the Town Car again adopted a tall roofline to allow for external visibility of the President (sharing little commonality with the production vehicle). To accommodate the increased weight of the taller roofline, armor plating, and bulletproof glass (though its true curb weight remains classified), Ford fitted the vehicle with the 7.5L (460 cubic-inch) V8 and E4OD 4-speed heavy-duty transmission from its 350-series full-size truck/van line. Currently, this remains the final Lincoln-brand vehicle used as a Presidential State Car; from 1993 onward, the Secret Service has selected Cadillac-brand vehicles for its motorcade cars.
