= Lincoln Continental Mark VI =

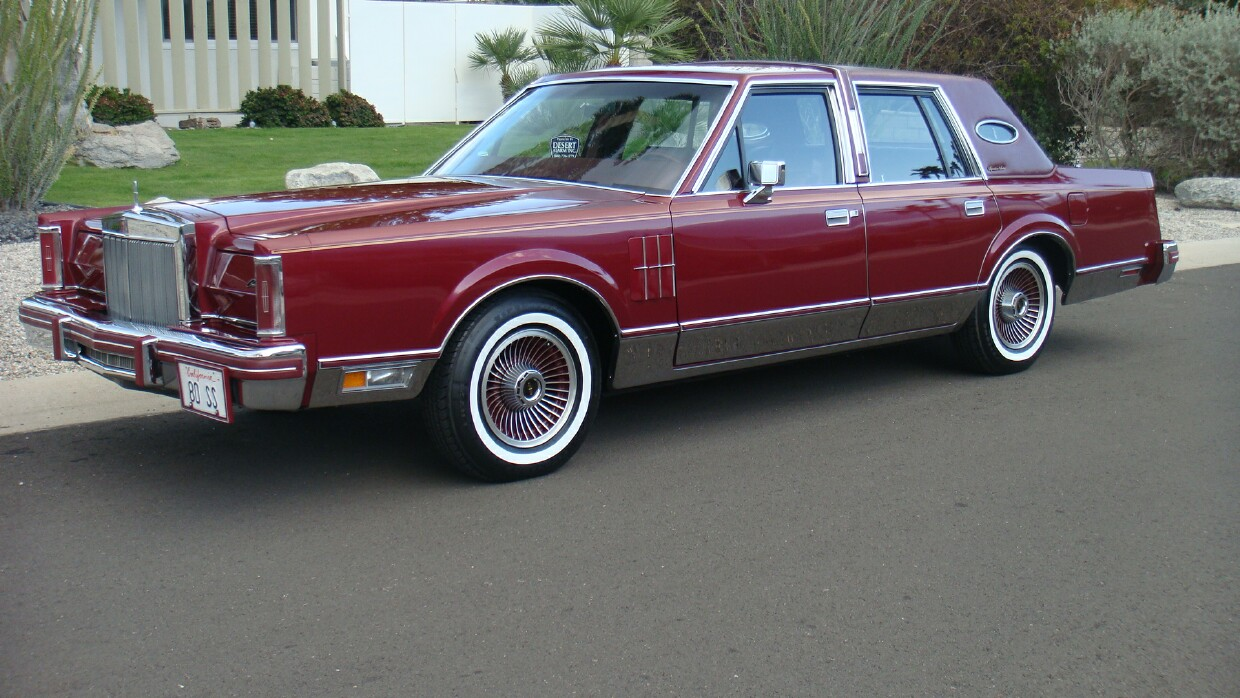
- 1980 Continental Mark VI Signature Series 4-door

Overview
- Manufacturer: Lincoln (Ford)
- Model years: 1980–1983
- Assembly: United States: Wixom, Michigan (Wixom Assembly)
- Designer: John Aiken (1976)

Body and chassis
- Class: Full-size personal luxury car
- Body style: 2-door sedan 4-door sedan
- Layout: FR layout, body-on-frame
- Platform: Ford Panther platform
- Related: Lincoln Continental (1980); Lincoln Town Car (1981–1989)

Powertrain
- Engine: 302 cu in (4.9 L) 5.0L V8; 351 cu in (5.8 L) Windsor V8 (1980 only)
- Transmission: 4-speed AOD automatic

Dimensions
- Wheelbase: 2-door: 114.4 in (2,910 mm); 4-door: 117.4 in (2,980 mm)
- Length: 2-door: 216.0 in (5,490 mm); 4-door: 219.2 in (5,570 mm)
- Width: 78.1 in (1,980 mm)
- Height: 2-door: 55.1 in (1,400 mm); 4-door: 55.8 in (1,420 mm)
- Curb weight: 3,892–4,219 lb (1,765–1,914 kg)

Chronology
- Predecessor: Continental Mark V
- Successor: Continental Mark VII

The Continental Mark VI is a full-size luxury car manufactured by Ford Motor Company from 1980 to 1983 and marketed by its Lincoln-Mercury division. As the fifth generation of the Mark series, the Continental Mark VI served as Ford's flagship.

The first complete redesign of the Mark series since 1972, the Mark VI was the first to undergo downsizing, no longer sharing its platform with the 1967–1976 Ford Thunderbird (its companion model since the inaugural 1969 Mark III) and now sharing its platform with the Lincoln Continental (renamed Lincoln Town Car for 1981). To distinguish itself from the Town Car, the Mark VI was fitted with model-exclusive features, including Designer Edition trims. Alongside the traditional two-door sedan bodystyle, the Mark VI introduced a four-door sedan to the model line (last offered in 1960).

The Continental Mark VI was manufactured alongside the Lincoln Continental and Town Car at the Ford Wixom Assembly Plant in Wixom, Michigan. In total, production reached 131,981. and for model year 1984, the Mark VI was replaced by the Continental Mark VII.

== Development ==
Ford began developing a downsized Continental Mark VI in the mid-1970s as a successor to the Continental Mark V, using what became the Ford Fox platform to be shared with a revised 1980 Ford Thunderbird and Mercury Cougar XR7. Due to budgetary constraints, planners chose instead to the base the Mark VI on the full-size Panther platform, increasing parts commonality with the Lincoln Continental.

Based on the success of the Mark IV and Mark V, Ford executives (led by Lee Iacocca) sought to expand the Mark series from a single personal luxury coupe into a comprehensive model line, reviving a stillborn approach proposed 20 years earlier with the Continental Division. As part of the switch to the full-size Panther platform, executives sought to add a four-door sedan, a woodgrained station wagon, and a premium 2-seat coupe to the Mark VI model line.

Following the 1978 departure of Lee Iacocca from Ford, the expansion of the Mark V model line was pared down to a four-door sedan. While the shift to the Panther chassis meant only an intermediate degree of downsizing (leaving the Mark VI far larger than the redesigned Cadillac Eldorado and Chrysler Cordoba), the Mark VI remained an intermediate step down from its Mark V predecessor. Along with its high degree of parts commonality with the Lincoln line (and mass-market vehicles such as the Ford LTD), allowing for the model line to be profitable, the Mark VI was to combine both luxury features and advanced technology.

== Overview ==
=== Chassis ===
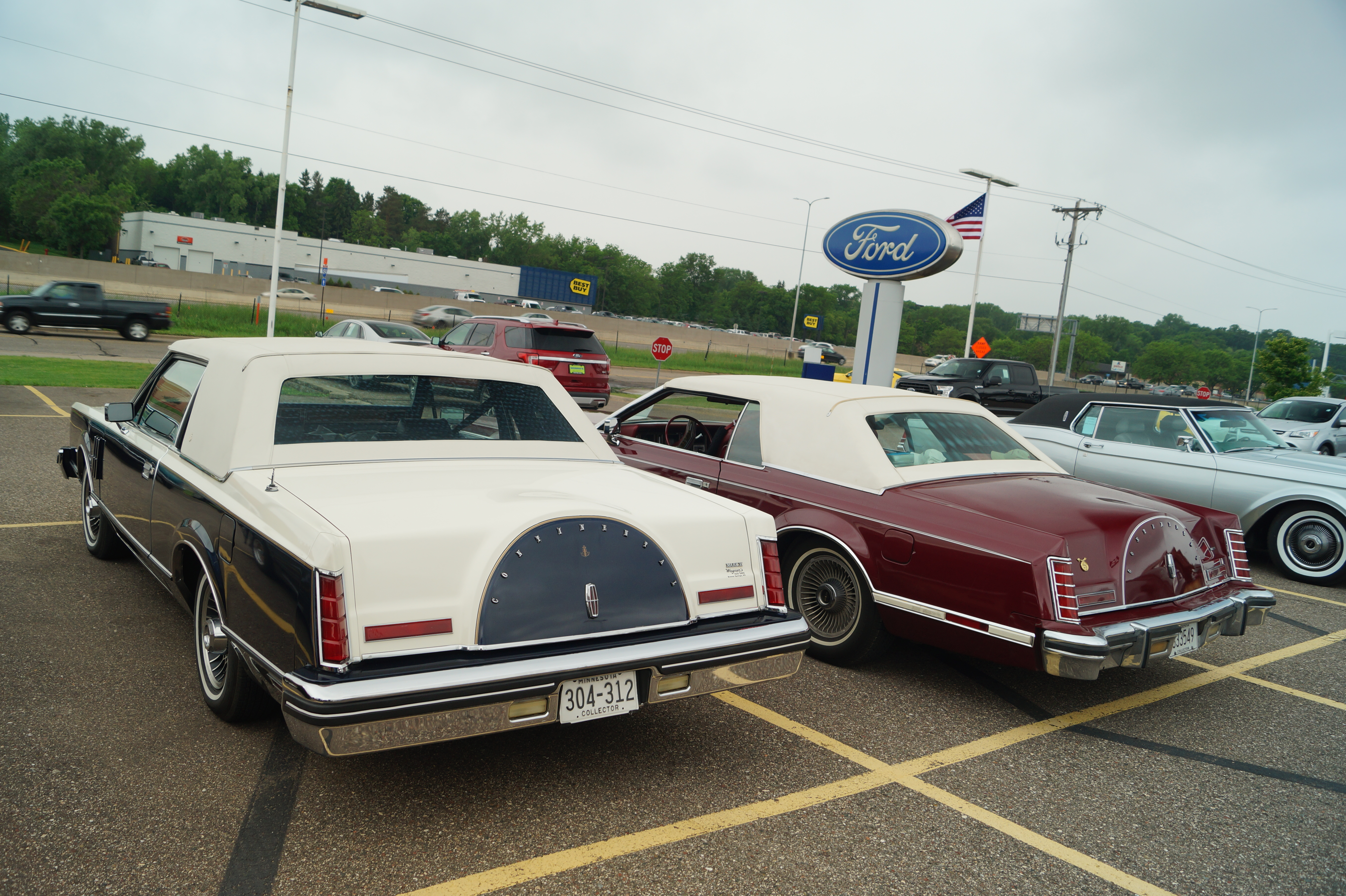
Side-by-side comparison: 1980 Mark VI and 1978 Mark V

The Continental Mark VI is based on the Ford Panther platform, shared with the Lincoln Town Car and other Ford Motor Company full-size cars of the 1980s into the late 2000s in North America. The Mark VI is rear-wheel drive with body-on-frame construction; it is fitted with coil-spring suspension on all four wheels.

In comparison to the Continental Mark V, the Mark VI is 800 pounds lighter and nearly 14 inches shorter than its predecessor. The Mark VI is the only version of the Panther platform that is built on two different wheelbases. The four-door sedan shares the 117.4 wheelbase with the Lincoln Continental/Town Car; the two-door utilizes the 114.4 wheelbase shared by the Ford and Mercury variants.

Prior to 1981 production, there was no distinct indicator in vehicle identification numbers (VINs) for vehicle make or manufacturer. Previously VINs only had indicators for the model year, assembly plant, body series (which represented only the vehicle model name and body style type), engine size and sequential production number. From 1981 onward, all vehicle manufacturers were required by the National Highway Traffic Safety Administration (NHTSA) to use a 17-character VIN-code with more detailed information. The first three digits is the World Manufacturer Identifier which indicates the country of origin and make of a vehicle. The 1981–1983 Continental Mark VI has the separate VIN code 1MR which designates Continental as the make instead of 1LN as Lincoln (used by the Lincoln Town Car).

==== Powertrain ====
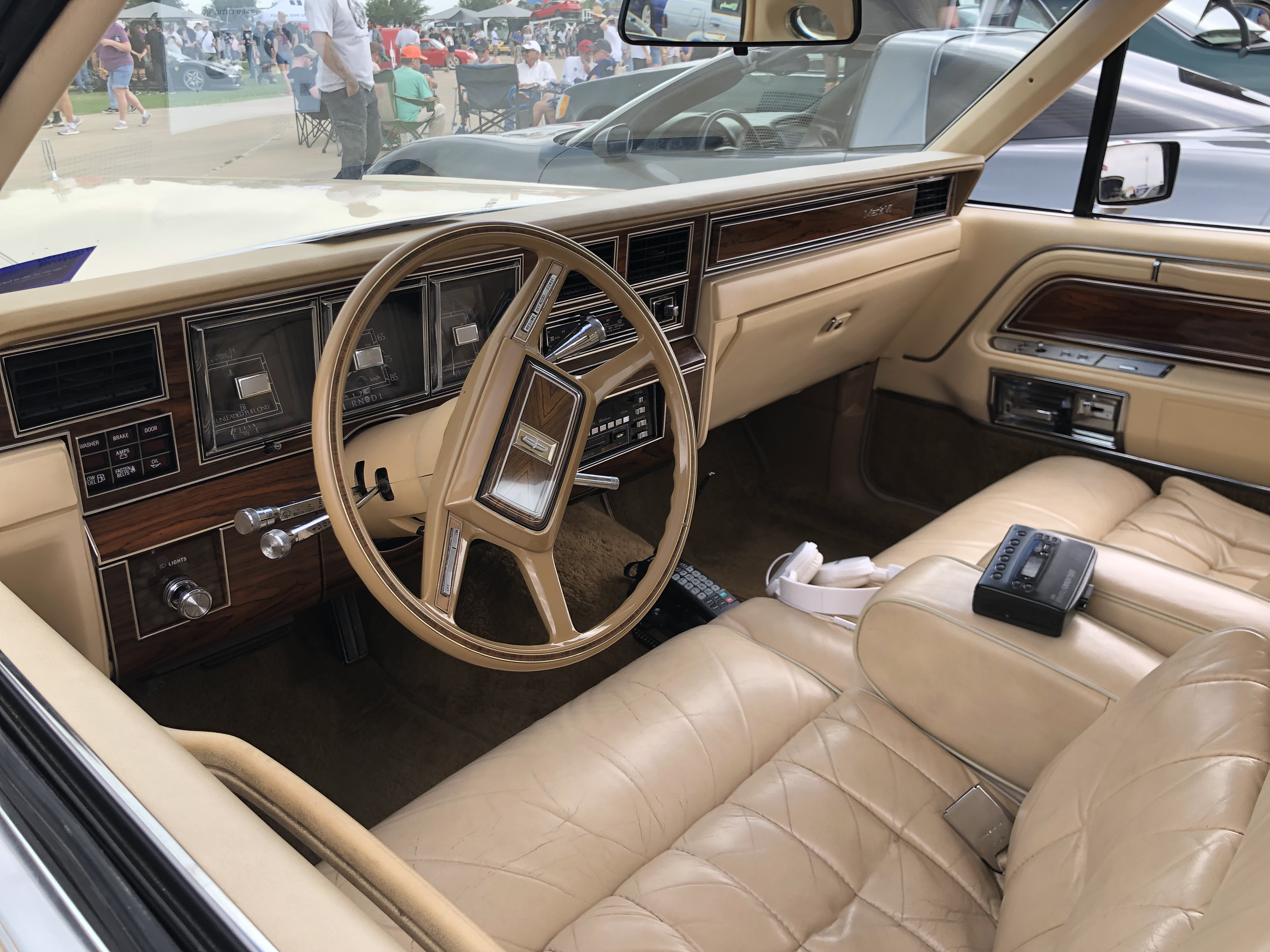
Continental Mark VI interior

In order to remain in compliance with increasingly stringent federal fuel economy standards (under CAFE, Ford Motor Company was required to average 20.0 MPG for all of its vehicles for 1980), significant changes were made to the powertrain for the Continental Mark VI. The 460 and 400 cubic-inch V8s seen in the Mark V were replaced in favor of lower-displacement V8 engines.

The standard engine for the Mark VI was a 302 cubic-inch V8, producing 140 hp. The first Ford V8 produced with throttle-body fuel injection, the engine was marketed by its 5.0L metric displacement (slightly rounded up from the technical 4.94L figure). As an option, a 351 cubic-inch (5.8L) V8 was offered; it used an electronically controlled 2-barrel carburetor. After 1980, the 351 was discontinued on the Mark VI, due to poor sales and the lack of a distinct power advantage over the 5.0L V8.

Both engines were paired to the AOD automatic transmission; introduced for 1980, the AOD replaced the commonly used 3-speed configuration with a 4-speed overdrive configuration, significantly lowering engine RPMs (and fuel consumption) at highway speeds. The 4-speed AOD was standard equipment on the Mark VI and all Lincolns (except the Versailles) for 1980 and was adopted by Panther-chassis Ford and Mercury vehicles for 1981.

Engine	Displacement	Years produced	Horsepower	Torque	Transmission
Ford Windsor V8 (5.0L)	4.9 L (302 cu in)	1980–1983	140 hp (104 kW) at 3600 rpm	231 lb⋅ft (313 N⋅m) at 2000 rpm	4-speed Ford AOD overdrive automatic
Ford Windsor V8 (351W)	5.8 L (351 cu in)	1980	140 hp (104 kW) at 3400 rpm	265 lb⋅ft (359 N⋅m) at 2000 rpm	4-speed Ford AOD overdrive automatic

=== Body ===
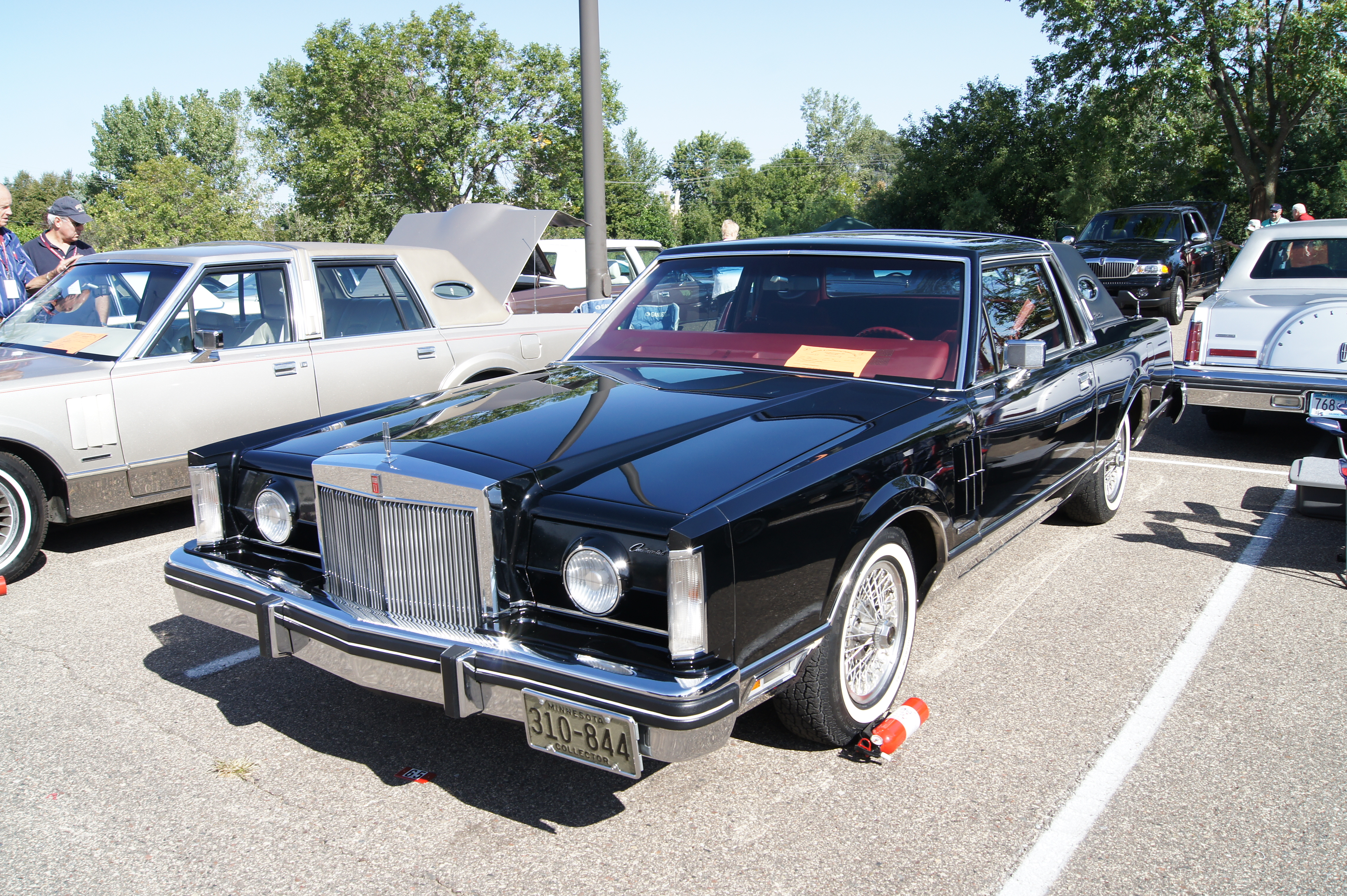
Continental Mark VI with optional touring lights (1982 Signature Series two-door)

As the Mark V remained throughout its production, much of its sharp-edged design played a role in the design of the downsized Panther-platform Lincolns. While the hardtop roofline of the two-door was replaced by a fixed B-pillar (with framed door glass), the Mark VI two-door shared a similar roofline with its predecessor; the four-door shared its roofline with the Lincoln Town Car (distinguished by oval opera windows).

In line with its flagship model status, the Mark VI had more ornate styling than the Lincoln Town Car, including hidden headlamps, fender vents (non-functional), C-pillar oval opera windows, and forward-sloping taillamps; the Continental tire trunklid returned nearly unchanged from the Mark V.

The Mark VI featured Ford's proprietary keypad entry system marketed as SecuriCode, digital instrumentation (Vacuum Fluorescent Display), trip computer, Fords EEC III engine management systems, parking lights integrated with the front turn signals, and so called Touring Lights, the latter which were low-powered and mounted on the "hidden-headlamp doors", activated with the parking lights. They provided decorative lighting only, insufficient lighting to serve night driving or as daytime running lights and were automatically deactivated and stowed when the headlights were active.

=== Trim ===
Alongside the standard Continental Mark VI, two additional trims were offered within the model line, including the Designer Editions and the flagship Signature Series.

=== Signature Series ===
For 1980, the Signature Series was available in both coupe and sedan formats. Intended as a successor to the 1979 Collector's Series option package, the Signature Series included nearly every available feature as standard equipment. The option was offered with either burgundy or silver exteriors; all vehicles came with a red interior (leather or velour upholstery). When first introduced in September 1979, the listed MSRP for the coupe was $20,940 (equivalent to $92,900 in 2025) and $21,309 USD (equivalent to $94,500 in 2025).

Unique features included a rechargeable glove box flashlight, special seat sew pattern, gold and Macaser Ebony wood treatments and a complete digital instrument cluster with fully electronically controlled EEC III engine with a 4-speed AOD, and a leather-bound tool kit in the trunk.

The Signature Series returned for 1981; red and silver exteriors were again offered, with black and white exterior colors becoming an option near the end of the model year. As with 1980, all examples were produced with red interiors, in leather or velour. For 1982 and 1983, the Mark VI Signature Series underwent a revision, as it became available in any exterior and interior color offered for the Mark VI. The tool kit and glove box flashlight were no longer featured as well.

==== Designer Series ====
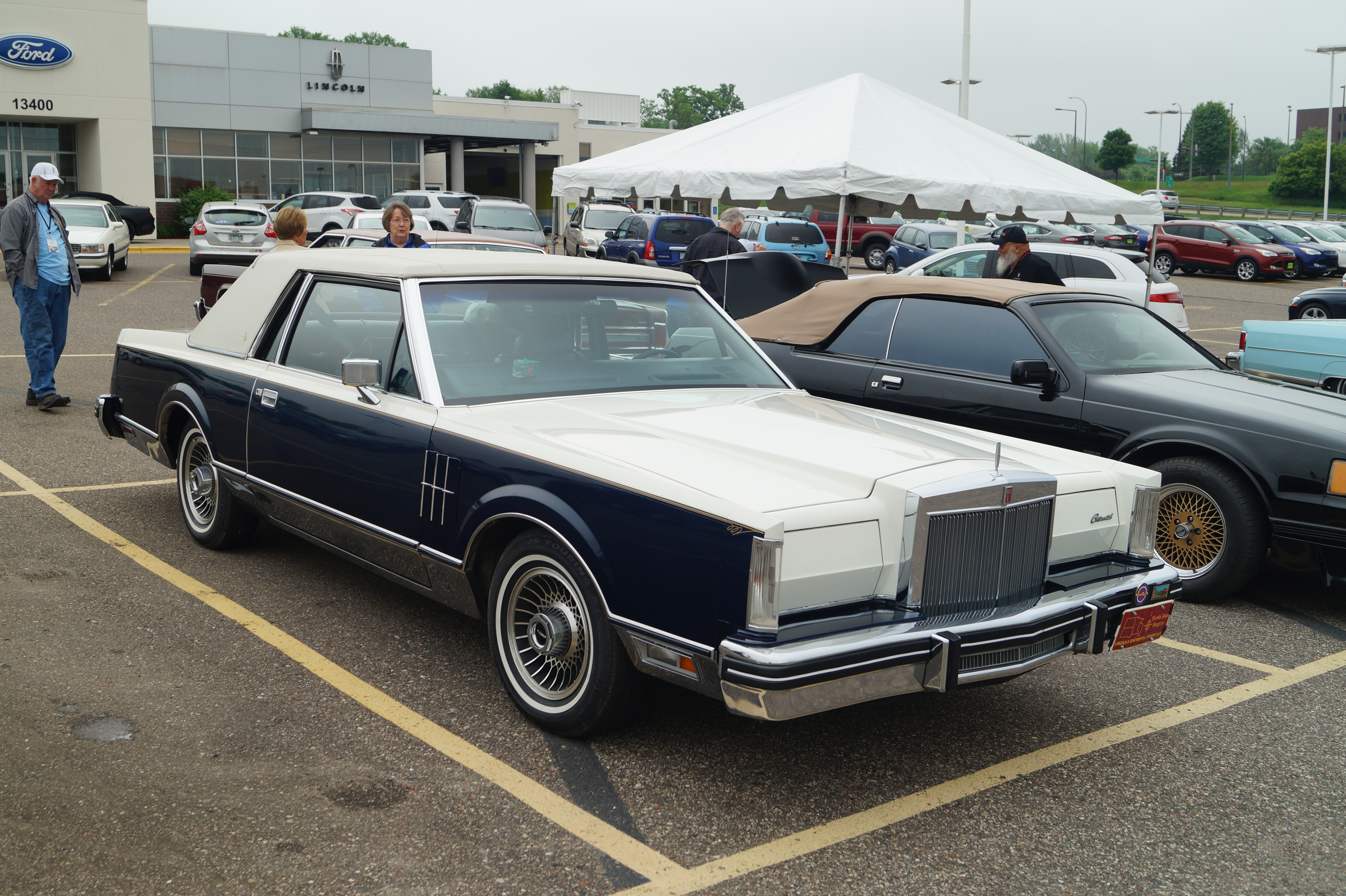
1980 Continental Mark VI Bill Blass Edition two-door

For 1980, the Designer Series made their return to the Mark Series coupes, including Cartier, Pucci, Bill Blass, and Givenchy Editions. As before, each Designer Series option carried exclusive exterior and interior color combination and additional equipment over the standard-trim Mark VI. Bill Blass exterior came with Dark Blue Metallic with white upper accents and Midnight Blue with white accents in leather or cloth upholstery. Cartier came with Light and Medium Pewter paint with matching Light and Medium Pewter interior in leather or cloth with red accent stripes on the fenders and interior surfaces. Pucci came with Light and Medium Fawn Brown Metallic exterior paint with matching Light and Medium Fawn upholstery in leather or cloth upholstery. Givenchy offered Light Fawn Brown with Bittersweet Red metallic paint with matching interior combinations in leather or cloth upholstery.

For 1981, these trim packages remained unchanged through 1982. The Givenchy color combinations were Light Fawn and Bittersweet Red Metallic for exterior paint and interior upholstery in cloth or leather. The Cartier color combinations were light and medium pewter exterior paint with a dark red accent stripe, and the interior offered matching light and medium pewter color combinations in cloth or leather. The Pucci offered light and medium Fawn metallic exterior and interior color combinations. The Bill Blass color combinations were dark blue metallic with white upper accents. The Givenchy package added $1,739 (equivalent to $7,700 in 2025), the Cartier and Pucci packages added $2,191 to the Signature Series MSRP (equivalent to $9,700 in 2025), and the Bill Blass package added $2,809 (equivalent to $12,500 in 2025).

For 1982, the series underwent a shuffle of sorts, with the Pucci edition moving from the sedan from the coupe. The Cartier edition was shifted from the Mark VI to the Town Car, leaving the Bill Blass and Givenchy edition coupes.

For 1983, the Givenchy Edition was shifted to the Continental, leaving the Bill Blass coupe and Pucci sedan; a coupe version of the Pucci edition made its return as a mid-year introduction. For the final year of the Mark VI Designer series, the coupe was available with either Pucci or Bill Blass color combinations, while the sedan was only available as Pucci. The Bill Blass coupe came in two, dual-shade color combinations; Midnight Black and French Vanilla upper accent with a Cambria cloth carriage roof, or French Vanilla and Midnight Black upper accent exterior with matching French Vanilla cloth or leather upholstery. The Pucci Designer Series offered Blue Flannel Mist exterior paint with Academy Blue cloth or leather upholstery.

== Sales ==
Year	Sales
1980	38,391
1981	36,398
1982	26,336
1983	30,856
Total	131,981

== See also ==
- Lincoln Town Car
- Ford Panther platform
