= Lincoln Continental Mark V =

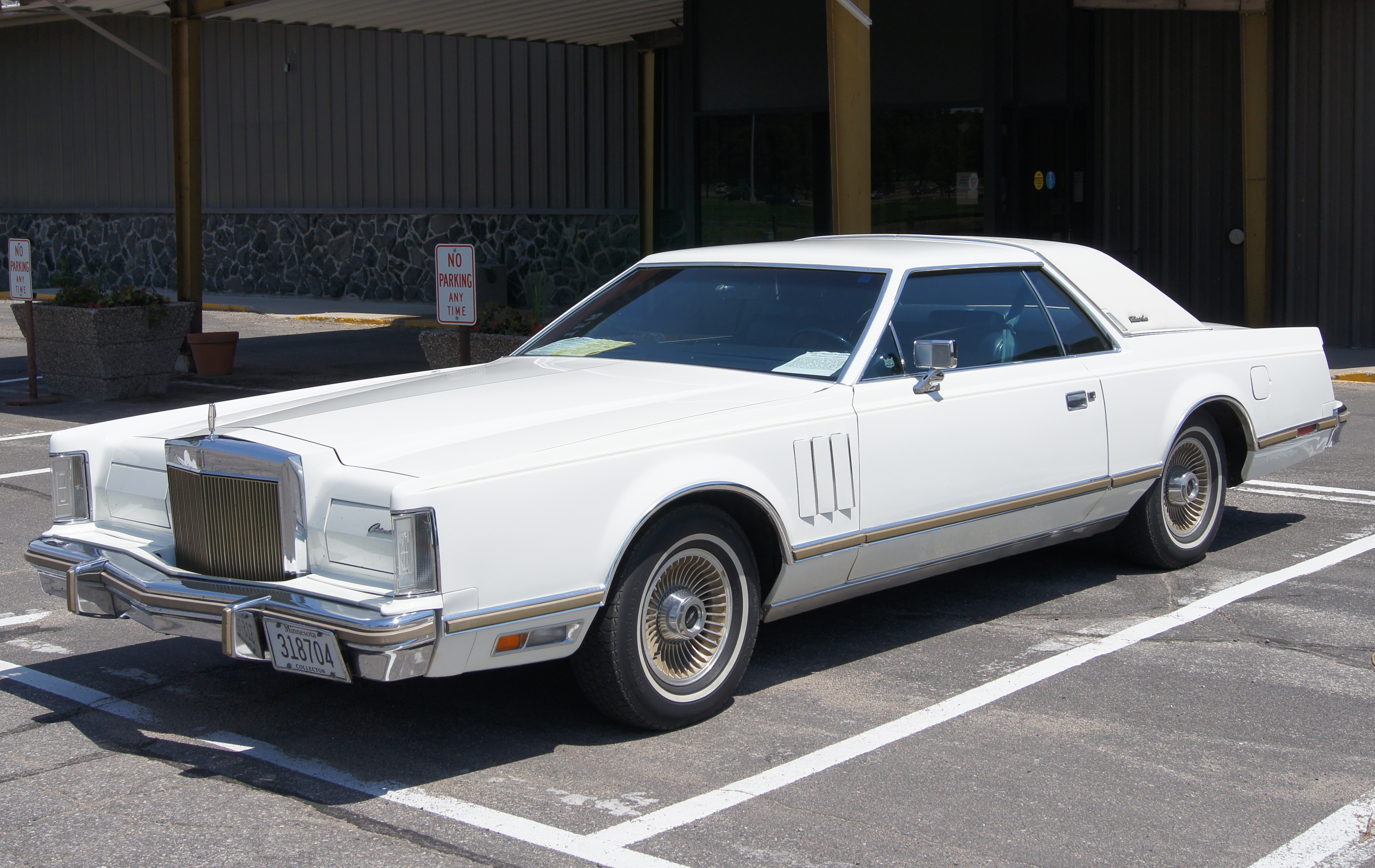
- 1979 Continental Mark V Collector's Series

Overview
- Manufacturer: Lincoln (Ford Motor Company)
- Model years: 1977–1979
- Assembly: United States: Wixom, Michigan (Wixom Assembly Plant)
- Designer: Gene Borndinat and team

Body and chassis
- Class: Personal luxury car
- Body style: 2-door coupe
- Layout: FR layout
- Related: Continental Mark IV; Ford Thunderbird (1972–1976)

Powertrain
- Engine: 400 cu in (6.6 L) 335 Series V8; 460 cu in (7.5 L) 385/Lima V8
- Transmission: three-speed C6 automatic

Dimensions
- Wheelbase: 120.4 in (3,058 mm)
- Length: 230.3 in (5,850 mm)
- Width: 79.7 in (2,024 mm)
- Height: 52.9 in (1,344 mm)
- Curb weight: 4,762–4,960 lb (2,160–2,250 kg)

Chronology
- Predecessor: Continental Mark IV
- Successor: Continental Mark VI

The Continental Mark V is a personal luxury coupe marketed in North America by the Lincoln division of Ford Motor Company for model years 1977–1979. It was the third generation of the Mark Series that first began with the 1969 Continental Mark III. At 230 inches (5.8 m) in length, it was the longest two-door coupe Ford has ever marketed.

The Continental Mark V was assembled alongside the Lincoln Continental at Wixom Assembly (1957–2007), and were offered in several commemorative and designer editions; notable examples include the Diamond Jubilee Edition that was available in 1978 and the Bill Blass edition that was sold throughout the Mark V's three-year production run.

For 1980, the Mark V was replaced by the significantly downsized Continental Mark VI.

== Chassis ==
The Continental Mark V shares its chassis with its predecessor, the Continental Mark IV, with curb weight reduced from 5000 to 4600 pounds.

In the interest of fuel economy, the 1977 Continental Mark V was equipped with a 400 cubic-inch V8. This engine was shared with the Ford Thunderbird/Mercury Cougar and Ford LTD/Mercury Marquis. Outside of California, the 460 V8 remained available as an option. In 1979, the dual-exhaust version of the 400 was discontinued; the 460 was discontinued in the Mark V (and in all Lincolns) by 1980.

The Ford C6 three-speed automatic was the only transmission offered.

== Body ==
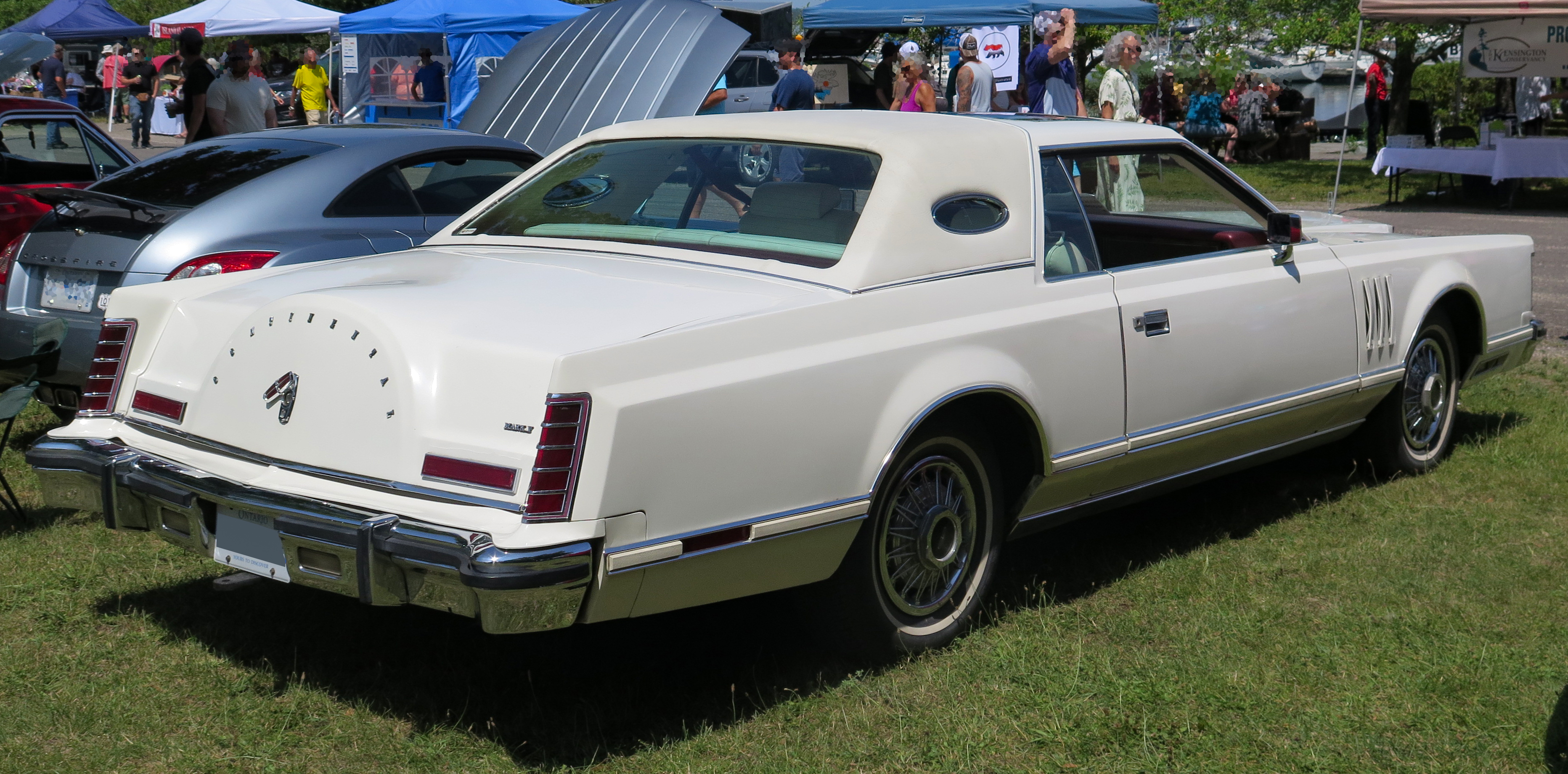
1978 Continental Mark V rear

The exterior design of the Mark V began life in the late 1960s, as an alternative design proposal for what would become the Continental Mark IV. During development, engineers intended for the vehicle to use especially wide Michelin tires, leading to an increase in the flare of the wheel openings, which remained even though the wider tires were deleted from the development program.

In Mark-series tradition, the Mark V retained the faux "spare tire" decklid (marketed as the Continental decklid), oval opera windows, hidden headlights, and a radiator-style grille. The front fenders were given functional louvers behind the front wheels. In a style similar to the Mark III, the Mark V was designed with vertical blade taillights. During its development, stylists tested taillights that curved into the top of the rear fender blades, which failed to gain approval of the focus clinics.

While technically a $187 option, all Mark Vs were fitted with a vinyl roof unless specified otherwise. For the 1979 year model, the vinyl roof could no longer be deleted.

== Engines ==
Engine	Displacement	Compression Ratio	Carburetor	Horsepower (SAE net)	Torque (SAE Net)	Transmission
Ford 400 Cleveland V8	400 cu in (6.6 L)	8.0:1	Motorcraft 2150 2-barrel	179 hp (133 kW) at 3800 rpm	329 ft⋅lbf (446 N⋅m) at 1800 rpm	3-speed Ford C6 automatic
Ford 385/Lima V8	460 cu in (7.5 L)	8.0:1	Motorcraft 4350 4-barrel	208 hp (155 kW) at 4000 rpm	356 ft⋅lbf (483 N⋅m) at 2000 rpm	3-speed Ford C6 automatic

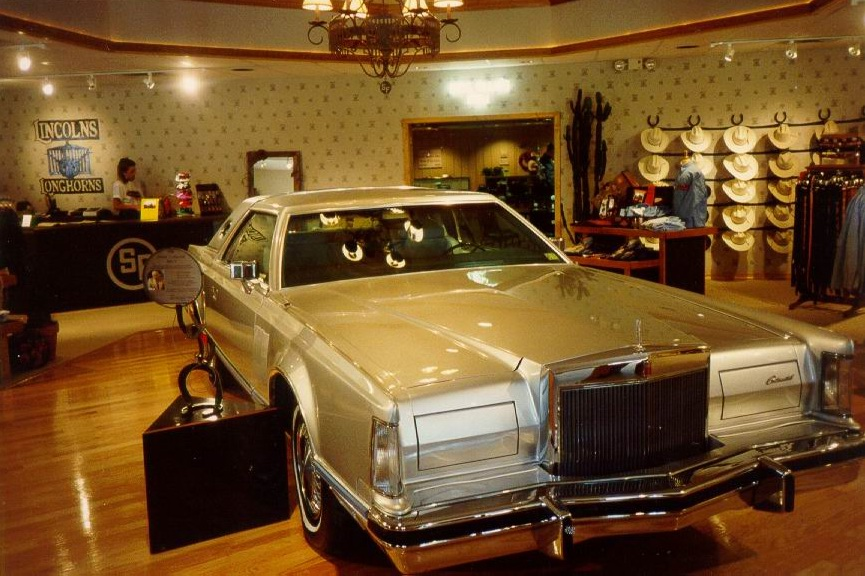
Jock Ewing's 1977 Continental Mark V from the television series Dallas

== Year-by-year changes ==
=== 1977 ===
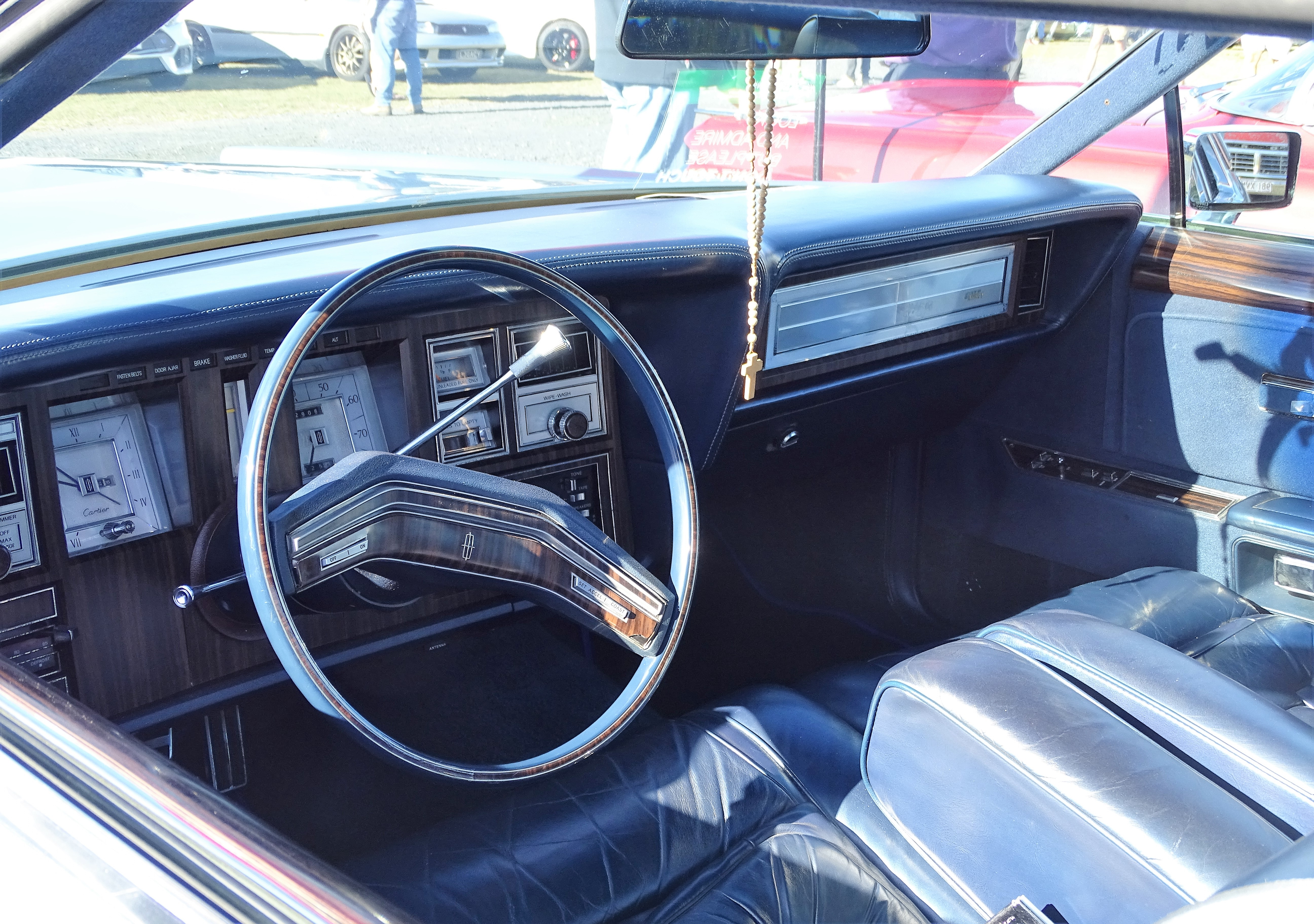
Continental Mark V interior

Previously standard issue on Marks III and IV, Ford's 7.5-liter (460 cid) V8 was optional for 1977, as a smaller 6.6 L (400 cid) V8 became standard. The 7.5 L V8 was not available at all on Mark V in the state of California, as it could not meet that state's tougher EPA certification standards. For 1977 only, California-bound Mark Vs were offered with the newly optional turbine-style aluminum wheels as standard equipment, to compensate for the missing engine option.

Also, 1977 was the first year since 1960 that a Mark-series model came with an all-metal, body-color painted (non-vinyl covered) roof as standard equipment. The full-vinyl roof – previously standard on Mark IV - was now optional, as was the rear-quarter Landau roof. The Givenchy Designer Series featured a forward-placed vinyl roof for all model years.

Mark IV's successful Designer Series Editions continued with revised color combinations on the new Mark V, as well as revised Luxury Group Option color trim packages. First available in mid-1975, as the "Versailles Option", a renamed-for-1977 "Majestic Velour Luxury Group" carried over to the Mark V - for 1977 only (minus the upper door trim panel wood-tone moldings - which were on Mark IV with the Versailles option). The returning Gold/Cream and new Cordovan Luxury Groups came with an available unique (small block pattern) "Romano Velour" on the seat pillow inserts and matching upper door panel inserts.

The optional Spring Luxury Group came with either Dove Grey (1N) or Dark Blue Metallic (3G) exterior paint, a choice of Dove Grey or Dark Blue for the vinyl roof color, bodyside molding color, and paint stripe color — and a standard two-tone, Dove Grey and Dark Blue, leather interior.

Luxury wheel covers, dating to the 1972 Mark IV, were carryover as standard on all Mark Vs, except for Designer Series models. The Mark IV-era forged aluminum wheels were optional, as would new-for-1977 alloy wheels with machined wheel lip and spoke edges with argent grey accent paint between the spokes and bright, cup-style metal center caps. These were standard on Designer Series models.

Standard tires in all three years were Michelin (225-15) steel-belted radials with a narrow white sidewall design. First optional in 1975, and remaining so through the end of the 1979 model year, were Goodyear's LR78-15" Custom Polysteel radials, in a dual band wide whitewall design. An inflatable spare tire with a pressurized propellant canister replaced the standard conventional full-size spare in 1977. Regardless of any exterior wheel option selected, the standard, conventional spare tire would be of either Michelin or Goodyear brand (matching the vehicle's four exterior tires) but would be mounted on a 15-inch conventional steel wheel.

An optional Illuminated Entry System became available in 1977, featuring a 25-second delay to the interior courtesy lights and door lock cylinder rings (activated by lifting either exterior door handle).

=== 1978 ===
A larger radiator, heater core inlets, and hoses were new, for improved coolant flow and heater performance. Door lock cylinders and ignition lock switches were revised. The standard 6.6 L (400 cid) V8 engine was slightly detuned, and the 7.5 L V8 was available.

A Diamond Jubilee Edition package was introduced to commemorate Ford Motor Company's 75th anniversary. Designer Series Editions and the Luxury Group offerings continued with revised color selections and trim.

For 1978, a two-stage, base-coat/clear-coat, was used for the Mark V for metallic colors only. Non-metallic, solid paint colors continued to use the traditional, single-stage paint.

Joining the optional full vinyl and rear vinyl roof options for 1978, was a full-length, simulated-convertible white canvas-embossed vinyl "Carriage Roof" option with an interior trim panel vanity mirror in lieu of opera windows. The power glass moonroof was not available with the Carriage Roof.

New options for 1978 included a digital (L.E.D. display) "Miles-to-Empty" fuel indicator, new wire wheel covers (non-locking) a garage door control integrated at the lower edge of the driver's side visor, a driver's illuminated exterior thermometer, a 40-channel CB radio with integrated hand-held microphone and controls as well as an integrated tri-band (AM/FM/CB) power antenna.

For 1978 only, revised standard wheel covers became available, with fewer ribs along the outside diameter of the wheel cover.

1978 models featured optional one year only, electro-mechanical seat belt warning chimes, standard only on Diamond Jubilee Edition. Lesser Mark Vs (in all years) were equipped with a traditional seatbelt warning buzzer, with a separate "key in ignition" warning buzzer unit.

=== 1979 ===
The 7.5 L (460 cid) V8 and dual-exhaust 400 V8 are discontinued to meet the newly mandated Corporate Average Fuel Economy (CAFE) standards.

A new AM/FM stereo radio with cassette tape player, as well as Ford's new Electronic AM/FM Stereo Search Radio with Quadrasonic 8-track tape player, became optional. The latter received a floor-mounted foot switch to scan radio stations or advance tracks on the 8-track player.

As the "Collector's Series" package became available, the optional Designer Series and Luxury Group featured revised color and trim selections.

The 1972-style Luxury Wheel Covers returned for Mark V's final year as standard issue (on all but Collector's Series and Designer Series models) - as would the optional Wire Wheel Covers (now standard on Emilio Pucci Designer Series) and Forged Aluminum Wheels. The also-optional very popular Turbine Style Aluminum Wheels continued with argent accent paint between the spokes, except on Collector's Series, and the Cartier, Bill Blass, and Givenchy Designer Series - where these models would be treated to color-keyed paint between the spokes, for unique added flair.

The white canvas-textured vinyl Carriage Roof option was standard on Bill Blass Designer Series with revised interior rear quarter trim panels with reading/courtesy lights. These new interior quarter trim panel inserts would also appear on the Collector's Series where the roof design eliminated the opera windows.

1978's electro-mechanical seat belt warning chimes carried over into 1979, standard on the Collector's Series and the Designer Series.

Full and Rear Landau vinyl roof options continued for 1979. The rare, all-metal, body-color painted roof (no vinyl whatsoever) was discontinued.

=== Features ===
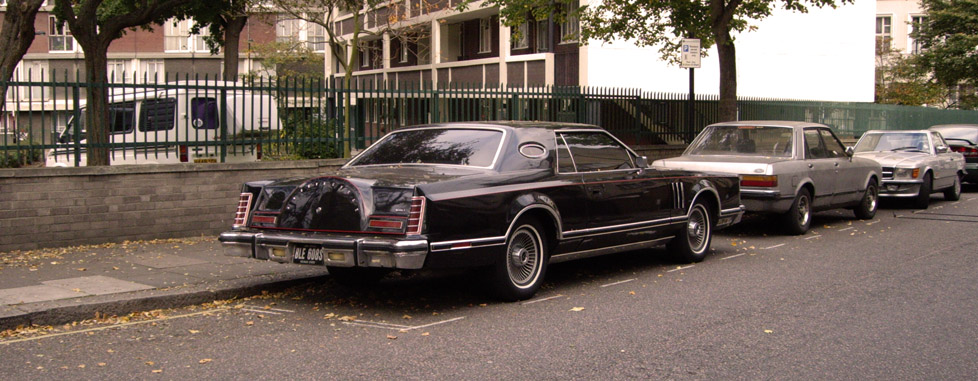
Rear 3/4 view of a Continental Mark V. Pictured is an example of the Mark V without a vinyl roof (rare).

Standard on all Mark Vs were four-wheel disc brakes, an anti-skid brake system, a Cartier-branded clock with a day/date feature, automatic temperature control air conditioning, power windows, a six-way power driver's seat, and a power radio antenna.

The 1978 Mark V offered an optional "Miles-To-Empty" indicator, replacing the "low fuel" lamp. The system represented the first dashboard LED display of a mechanical function.

== Editions ==
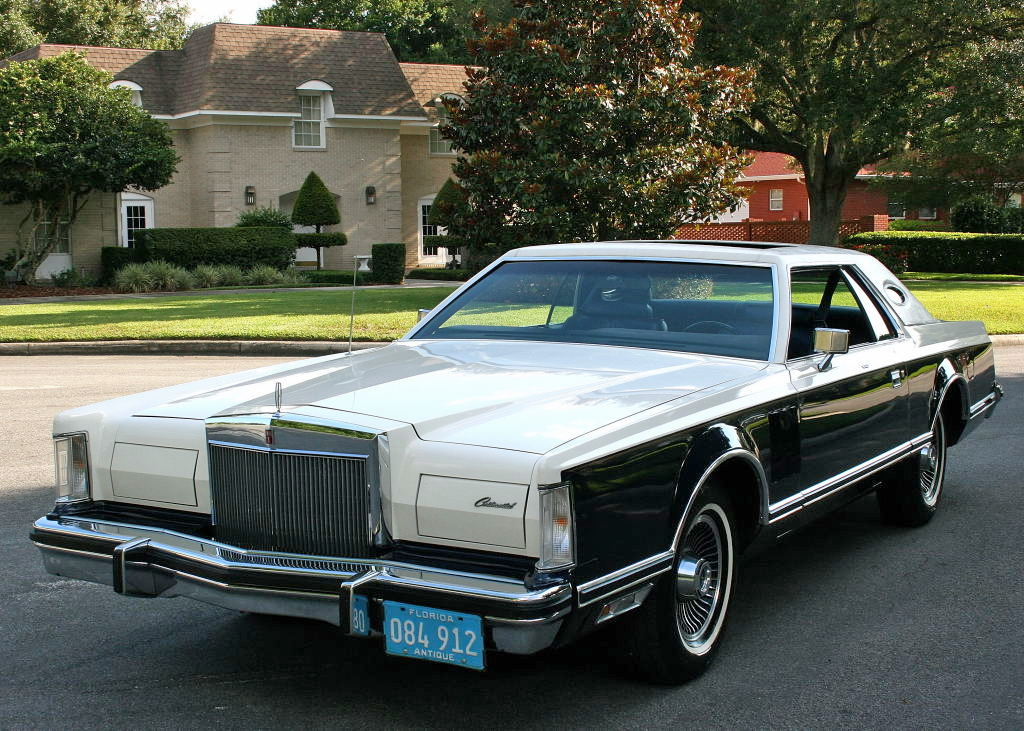
1979 Continental Mark V Bill Blass Designer Edition (with full vinyl roof)

Through its production, the Mark V was offered with appearance packages, marketed as the Designer Series, as well as a Luxury Group option package.

Two commemorative editions included the 1978 Diamond Jubilee Edition, marking Ford's 75th anniversary, and the 1979 Collector's Series, marking the end of Mark V production.

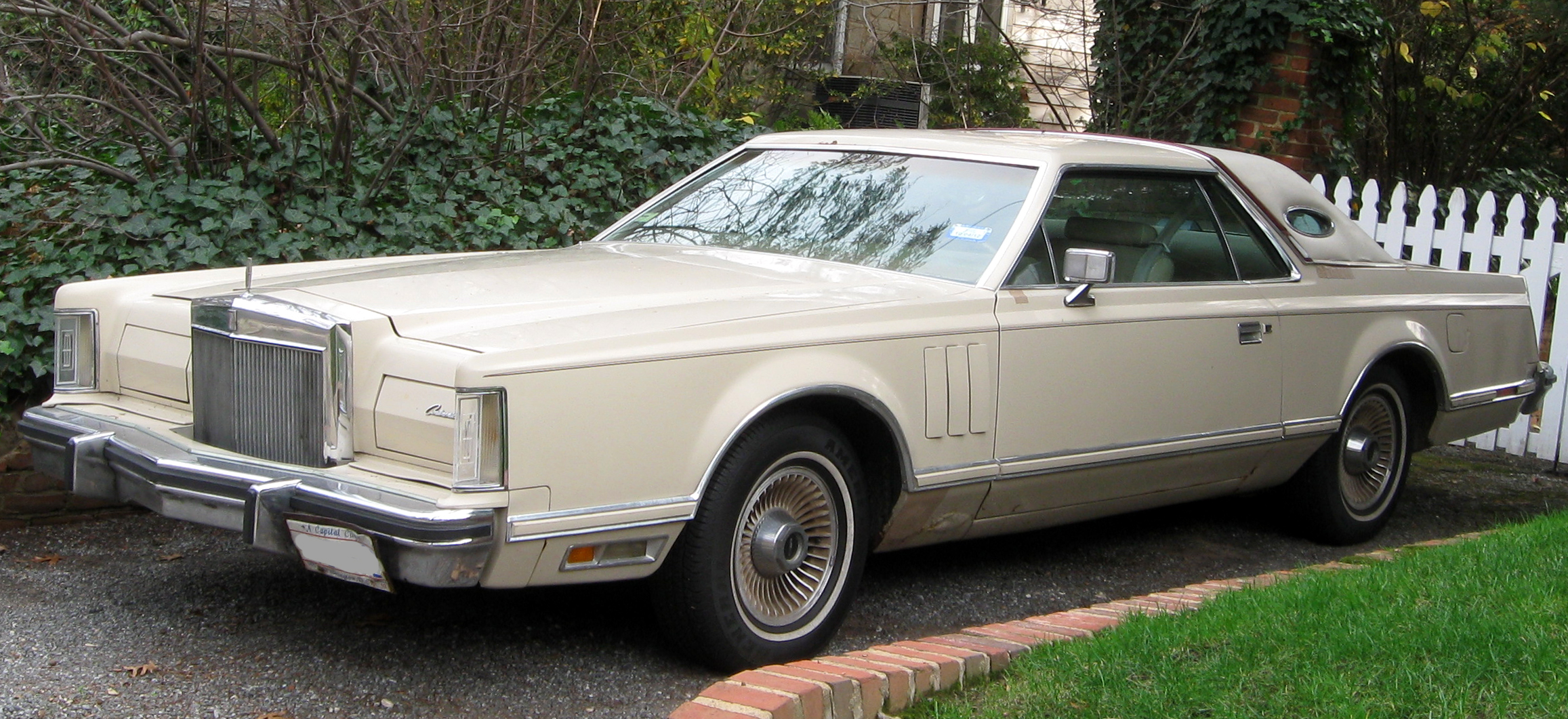
1979 Continental Mark V Cartier

=== Luxury Group (1977–1979) ===
From 1973 to 1981, Lincoln offered the Luxury Group option for Mark-series buyers, allowing a customer to select cloth or leather/vinyl interior trim, one to four exterior paint colors, landau or full-length vinyl or painted metal roof, bodyside molding (otherwise black) decklid paint stripe, wheels or wheel covers and black or whitewall tires.

Along with these combinations, customers ordering could order other options as well.

Below are some examples of the Luxury Group colors available during production:

- Gold-Cream (1977–1979)
- Cordovan (1977–1979)
- Light Jade/Dark Jade (1977–1978)
- Turquoise (1979)
- Midnight Blue-Cream (1977)
- Red-Rosé (1977–1979)
- Wedgewood Blue (1978–1979)
- Champagne (1979)
- White (1979)
- Majestic Velour (1977)

=== Designer Series (1977–1979) ===
Designer Series appearance packages were available in Bill Blass, Cartier, Givenchy, and Emilio Pucci series — each with coordinated exterior paint, interior upholstery and trim, vinyl roof and body-side moldings. Each was distinguished by a corresponding decklid decal, the designer's signature in the opera window glass, and a dash-mounted 22-karat gold-plated nameplate.

Designer Series options varied each year. In 1979, the Bill Blass, Cartier, and Givenchy Designer Series adopted color-keyed alloy wheels alongside the Collector's Series (a feature introduced on the Diamond Jubilee Edition).

Continental Mark V Designer Series Specifications
Designer Series		Bill Blass	Cartier	Givenchy	Pucci
1977	Exterior	Dark Midnight Blue (31) (non-metallic)	Dove Grey (1N) (non-metallic)	Dark Jade Metallic (46)	Black Diamond Fire Metallic (1L)
1977	Interior	Chamois Leather (with Pigskin Textured Inserts)	Dove Grey (Leather, Majestic Velour)	Dark Jade (Leather, Majestic Velour)	White Leather (with black component trim)
1977	Vinyl Top	Chamois Lugano Grain Landau Vinyl Roof	Dove Grey Landau/Full Vinyl Roof	Chamois Lugano Grain (Front-half Roof)	White Cayman Grain Landau/Full Vinyl Roof
1978	Exterior	Midnight Cordovan (5L) (non-metallic)	Light Champagne (52) (non-metallic)	Midnight Jade (7V) (non-metallic)	Light Silver Metallic (1Y) ("Moondust" paint)
1978	Interior	Cordovan (Ultravelour Cloth, Leather with Light Champagne accent straps/buttons)	Champagne with Dark Red accent straps/buttons (Leather, Media Velour)	Jade Leather (with Broadlace-embroidered Givenchy "G" logo)	Dove Grey Leather (with Dark Red accent straps/buttons and components)
1978	Vinyl Top	Light Champagne Valino grain Rear Landau (YU) / Full-Vinyl (VU)	Light Champagne Valino grain Rear Landau (YU) / Full-Vinyl (VU)	Chamois Lugano Grain (Front-half Roof)	Black Cayman Grain Landau/Full Vinyl Roof
1979	Exterior	White (9D) upper body over Midnight Blue Metallic (3Q) ("Moondust" paint)	Light Champagne (52) (non-metallic)	Crystal Blue Metallic (2D) ("Moondust" paint)	Medium Turquoise Metallic (4C) ("Moondust" paint)
1979	Interior	White Leather (with Midnight Blue accent straps/piping and components); Midnight Blue Leather (with White accent straps/buttons)	Champagne with Dark Red accent straps/buttons (Leather, Media Velour)	Dark Crystal Blue Leather (with Broadlace-embroidered Givenchy "G" logo	White Leather (with Midnight Blue accent straps/buttons and components)
1979	Vinyl Top	White Carriage Roof - standard Diamond grain vinyl (CW); White Full Vinyl Roof - optional Valino grain vinyl (VW)	Light Champagne Landau Vinyl Roof (YU) (with Dark Red wrapover molding with integral coach lamps)	Crystal Blue Valino Grain Front-half Roof (Z7)	Midnight Blue Valino grain Full-Vinyl Roof (VQ)

=== Diamond Jubilee Edition (1978) ===
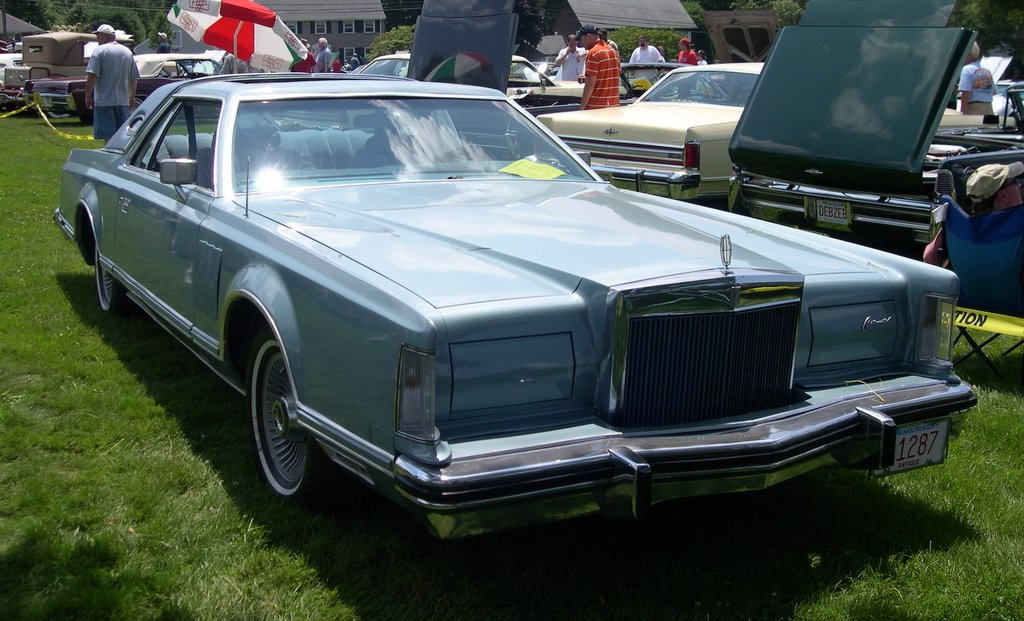
Continental Mark V Diamond Jubilee Edition

To commemorate the 75th anniversary of Ford Motor Company in 1978; Ford released Diamond Jubilee Editions of the 1978 Ford Thunderbird and Continental Mark V. Adding $8,000 to the price of a Mark V, the Continental Mark V Diamond Jubilee was the most expensive vehicle ever sold by Ford Motor Company at the time, raising the price of the Mark V to over $21,000 ($103,661 in 2025 dollars). Only four options were available: the 460 V8 (with or without dual exhaust) a power moonroof, and a 40-channel CB radio.

In a style similar to the Designer Series, the Diamond Jubilee Edition was given its own design. The exterior was given a nearly monochromatic exterior, with color-keyed body moldings, vinyl top, wheels, grille, hood ornament, and trunk lid; two colors were available and exclusive to the edition (Diamond Blue and Jubilee Gold). Chrome trim was largely limited to the window and grille surrounds, bumpers, and trim of the fender vents (exclusive to the edition). Alongside the Lincoln Versailles, the Diamond Jubilee Edition was one of the first Ford Motor Company vehicles to utilize clear-coat paint.

The interior was given its own model-specific trim. The split front bench seat was replaced by cloth bucket seats with a center console with a padded armrest; the rest of the interior included padded leather on high-wear areas. Designed to provide extra storage, the console stored an umbrella on the underside of the armrest. Matching its name, the opera windows featured simulated diamond chips inside the glass, with a Diamond Jubilee script on the window the hood ornament featured crystal-style inserts. All Diamond Jubilee Marks were supplied with a leather-bound owner's manual and tool kit. Every new owner was given car keys matching the interior trim and could request a Ford-created cookbook entitled "Ford Diamond Jubilee Recipe Collection".

In total, 5,159 Diamond Jubilee Edition Continental Mark Vs were produced. For 1979, the edition was repackaged as the Collector's Series.

=== Collector's Series (1979) ===
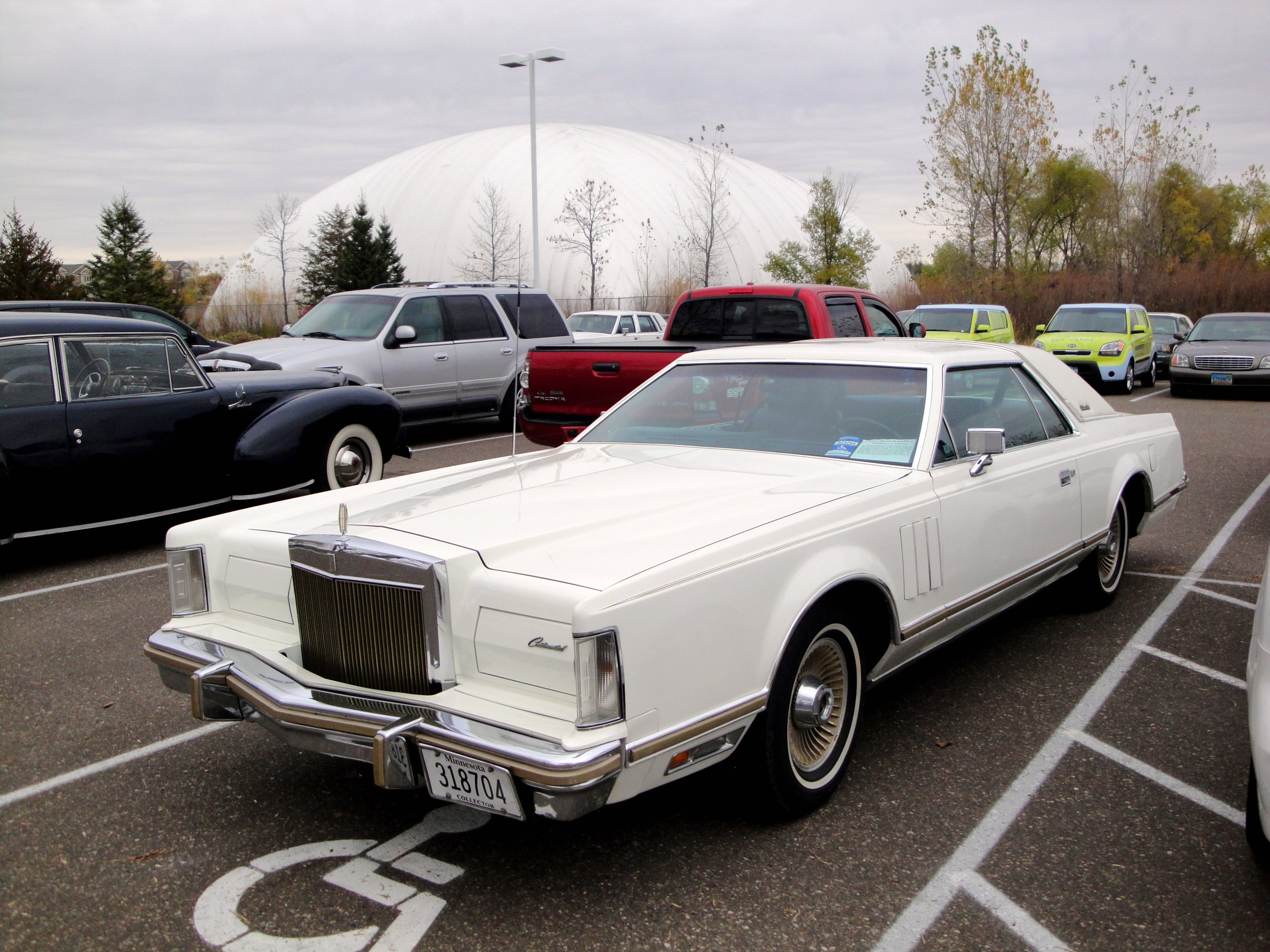
1979 Continental Mark V Collector's Series

To commemorate the end of Continental Mark V production, the 1978 Diamond Jubilee Edition was repackaged for 1979 as the Collector's Series. An $8,000 option for the Mark V ($35,488 in 2025 dollars) the Collector's Series Edition had a base price of nearly $22,000 ($97,593 in 2025 dollars). Alongside the Mark V, Lincoln marketed a similar edition of the Lincoln Continental sedan.

Distinguished from all other examples of the Mark V by its lack of opera windows, the Collector's Series was produced in four colors Midnight Blue Moondust Metallic, White, Diamond Blue Moondust Metallic (shared with the Diamond Jubilee Edition) and Light Silver Moondust Metallic. In a slightly monochromatic appearance, midnight blue and white cars have matching vinyl tops while silver and diamond-blue cars have midnight blue vinyl tops; all examples were given a gold-colored grille with a gold-trimmed hood ornament. Inside the trunk, both the trunk floor and the underside of the decklid were lined with color-keyed midnight-blue 18-ounce carpeting.

As with the Diamond Jubilee Edition, the Collector's Series included virtually every available feature as standard equipment on the Mark V. A cloth interior with a center console, rear-seat armrest, and bucket seats was standard; as a delete option, the Collector's Series could be ordered with a standard Mark V leather interior. Another delete option replaced the 8-track tape player with a cassette player.

In total, 6,262 Collector's Series editions were produced. 3,900 Midnight Blue examples were built, with 2,040 White (an unknown number without any vinyl top) 197 Diamond Blue, and 125 Silver.

== Sales ==
Although only on sale for three model years, with a total of 228,262 examples sold, the Continental Mark V is the best-selling version of the Continental Mark Series.

Year	Total sales	Limited Editions	Designer Edition
1977	80,321	N/A	
1978	72,602	5159 (Diamond Jubilee Edition)	16,537 Bill Blass: 3,975 Cartier: 8,520 Givenchy: 917 Pucci: 3,125
1979	75,939	6,262 (Collectors' Series)	19,215 Bill Blass: 6,720 Cartier: 9,470 Givenchy: 2,262 Pucci: 763
