= Lincoln Continental Mark IV =

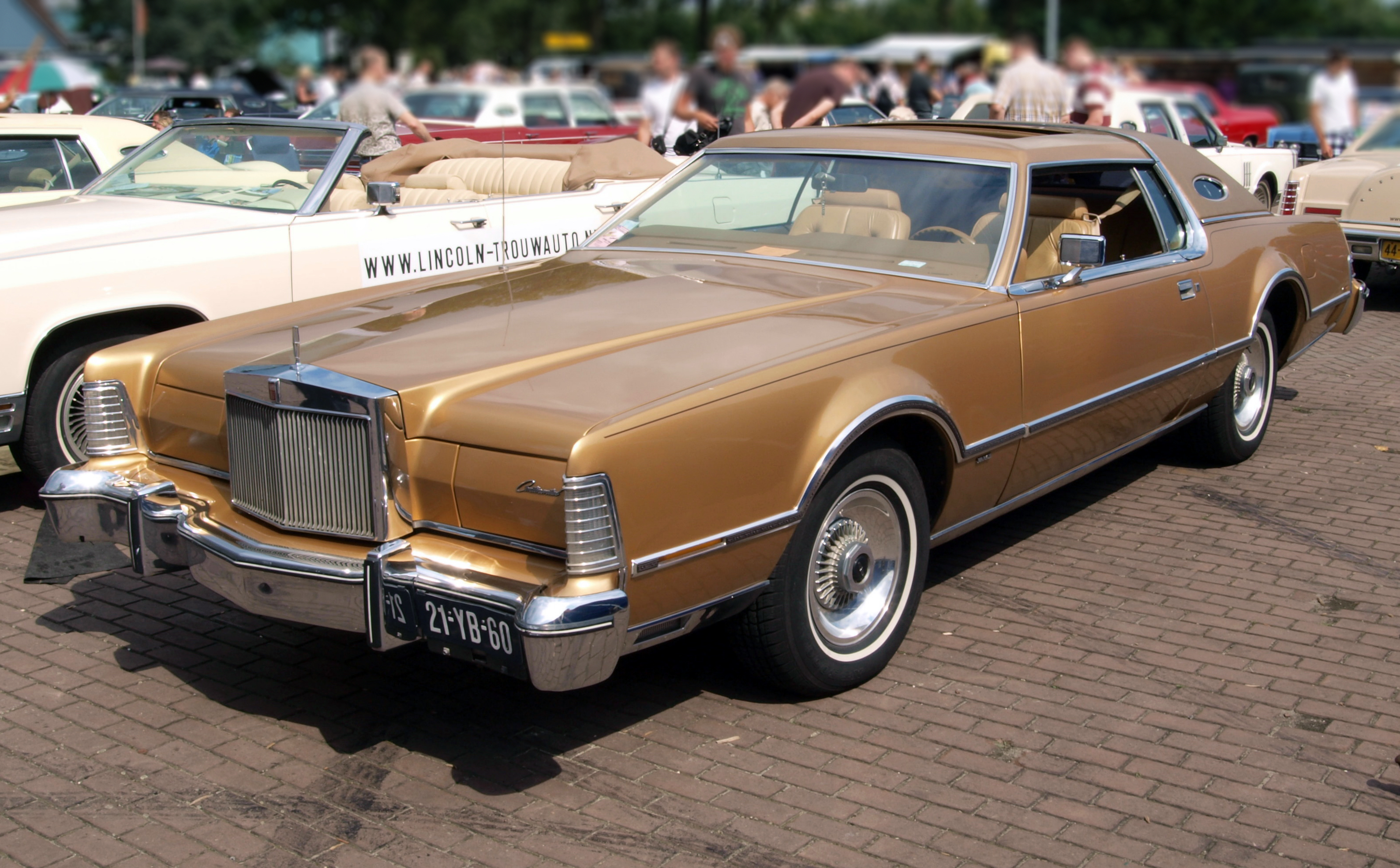
- 1975 Continental Mark IV

Overview
- Manufacturer: Lincoln (Ford)
- Production: 1971–1976
- Model years: 1972–1976
- Assembly: United States: Wixom, Michigan (Wixom Assembly)

Body and chassis
- Body style: 2-door coupe
- Layout: FR layout
- Related: Ford Thunderbird (sixth generation)

Powertrain
- Engine: 460 cu in (7.5 L) Ford 385 V8
- Transmission: 3-speed C6 automatic

Dimensions
- Wheelbase: 120.4 in (3,058 mm)
- Length: 228.1 in (5,794 mm)
- Width: 79.8 in (2,027 mm)
- Height: 53.5 in (1,359 mm)
- Curb weight: 5,264 lb (2,388 kg)

Chronology
- Predecessor: Continental Mark III
- Successor: Continental Mark V

The Continental Mark IV is a personal luxury car that was marketed by the Lincoln division of Ford Motor Company from the 1972 to 1976 model years. The third generation of the Mark series, the Mark IV grew in size over its Continental Mark III predecessor. As with the previous generation, the Mark IV saw little direct competition in the American marketplace, competing nearly exclusively against the Cadillac Eldorado (redesigned for 1971).

As with the Mark III, the Mark IV shared its chassis with the Ford Thunderbird, with the Mark IV receiving its own bodywork below the windows. Hidden headlights and a traditional chrome radiator grille were retained, and a Continental spare tire trunklid. For 1976, the Designer Series option package was introduced; in what would become a tradition for the Mark series (and later Lincoln), the option consisted of specially coordinated exterior and interior trims developed between Lincoln and contemporary fashion designers.

Ford assembled the Continental Mark IV at its Wixom Assembly Plant in Michigan) facility alongside the Ford Thunderbird and the Lincoln Continental. For 1977, the Mark IV underwent a substantial revision, becoming the Continental Mark V.

== Design ==
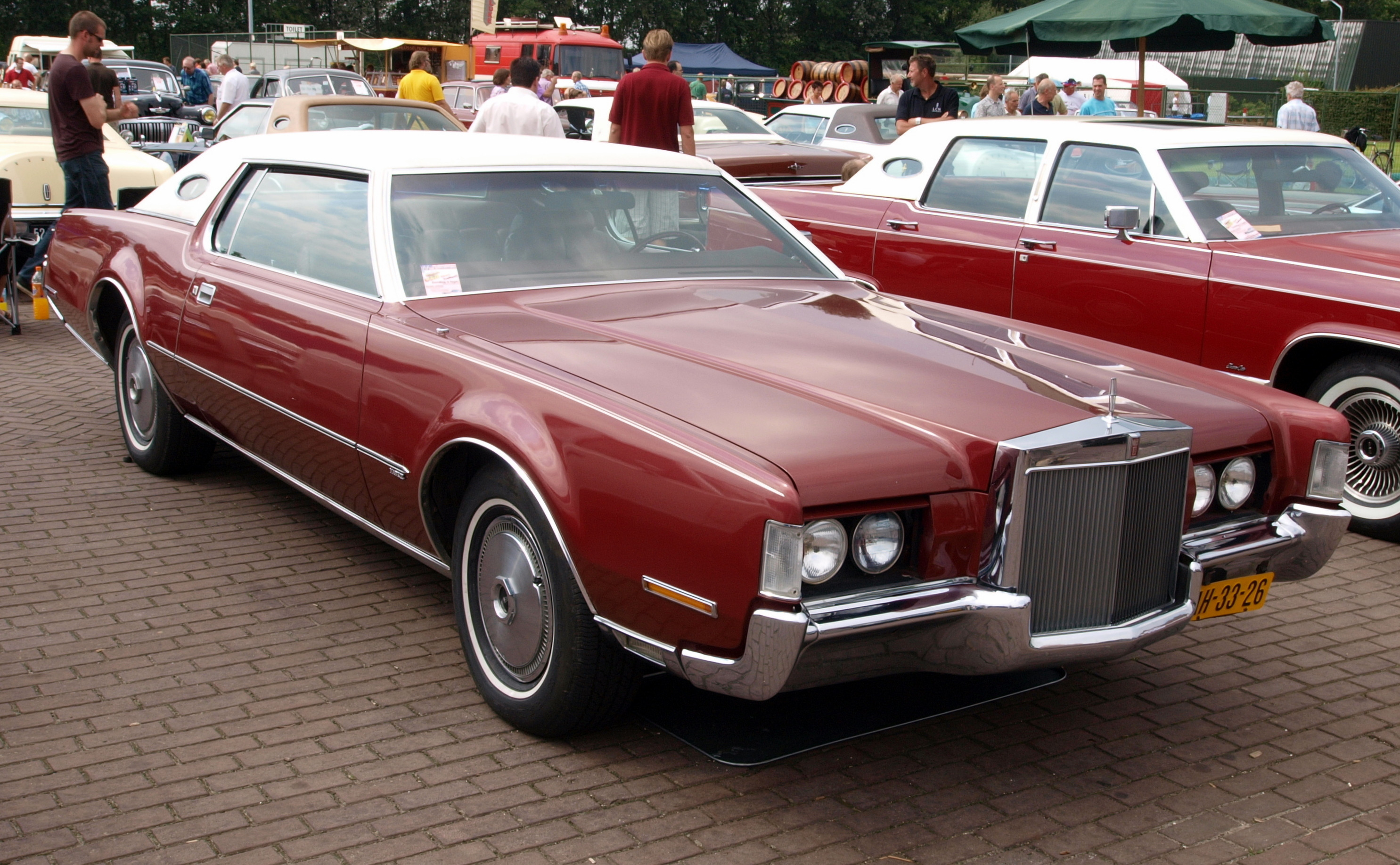
1972 Continental Mark IV, showing pre-facelift grille and headlight doors open

The Continental Mark IV retained the traditional "long-hood, short deck" coupe proportions of the Mark III, retaining its sharp-edged fenders, hidden headlamps, and signature faux Rolls-Royce style grille and decorative Continental spare. (The spare tire was in fact stored immediately behind the rear seat.)

The Mark IV and sixth-generation Ford Thunderbird were closely badge engineered variants of each other, with an increased parts commonality compared to the Mark IV's previous generation. The roofline, doors, and inner body panels were shared, with otherwise different outer body panels below the roofline.

In 1973, the Mark IV received revised front bodywork, necessitated by the addition of 5-mph bumpers. For 1974, a 5-mph bumper was added to the rear body work, moving the taillights from the bumper into the rear bodywork.

All Mark IVs were equipped with a vinyl roof. The Mark IV introduced a rear side window, termed an opera window, an almost universally specified option in 1972 that became standard the following year and remained through the discontinuation of the Mark VI after 1983.

The instrument panel featured faux wood trim, marketed as Kashmir Walnut Woodgrain Matina, with inset panels marketed as Baby Burl Walnut Woodgrain appliqué.

== Mechanical specification ==
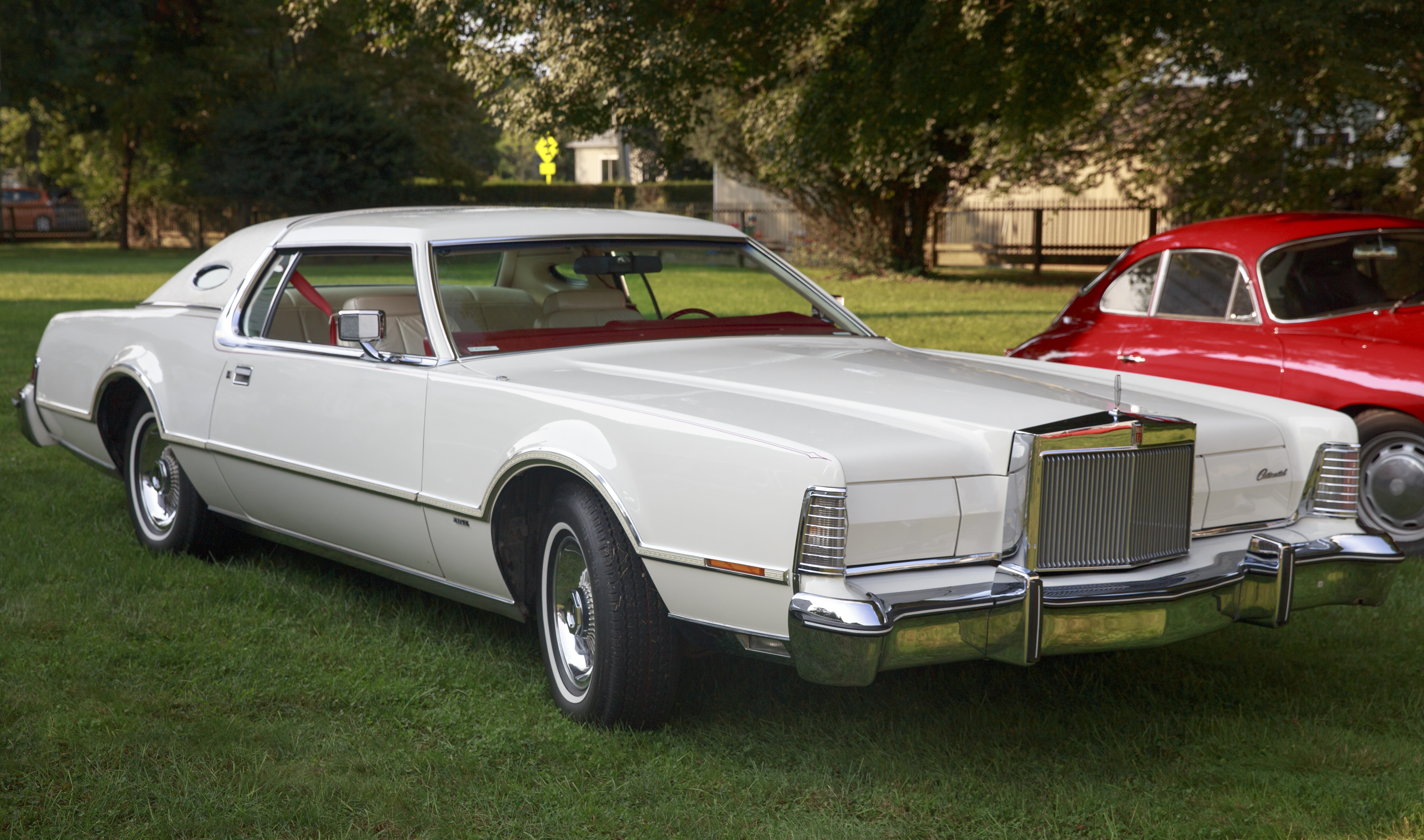
1975 Continental Mark IV "Lipstick and White Edition", an all-white option package with Lipstick Red interior details and carpeting.

All Mark IVs were equipped with the 460 cu in (7.5 L)-4V Ford 385 series V8 (with two valves per cylinder, "4V" is in reference to the four-venturi Autolite carburetor). Rated at 365 hp SAE gross (272 kW) in the Mark III, the 460 was carried over to the Mark IV. For 1972, rated output fell to 212 hp (158 kW) SAE net due to an industry-wide shift to reporting SAE net horsepower as the standard for measuring engine output to better reflect real-world engine performance as installed in vehicles.

All examples of the Mark IV were equipped with a Ford C6 three-speed automatic transmission, and Lincoln's "Sure-track" anti-lock rear brakes. Both front seats were power adjustable.

Performance was not quite competitive with contemporary premium personal luxury cars, including the equally large Cadillac Eldorado, its direct competitor.

== Designer Series ==
For 1976, Lincoln-Mercury introduced optional appearance packages, marketed as the "Designer Series", with flourishes by notable fashion designers (Bill Blass, Givenchy, and Pucci, and the famed jeweler Cartier. Each package featured an individually coordinated exterior and interior color combination with specific trim and interior fabrics. The opera window was fitted with the signature of the corresponding designer, and the dash was fitted with a 22-karat gold-plated dashboard plaque, which could be engraved with the name of the original owner.

1976 Continental Mark IV Designer Series
Edition	Exterior color/trim	Vinyl roof trim/material	Interior color/material
Bill Blass	Dark blue (cream and gold pinstriping) cream or body-color moldings	Cream "Normande grain"	Blue cloth or leather (cream accents)
Cartier	Dove gray (red and white pinstriping) body-color moldings	Dove gray "Valino grain"	Dove gray cloth or leather
Givenchy	Aqua blue "diamond fire" (black & white pinstriping) white or body-color moldings	White "Normande grain"	Aqua blue cloth or leather
Pucci	Red "moondust finish" & silver (silver and red pinstriping) silver or body-color moldings	Silver "Normande grain"	Dark red "majestic" cloth

Example of 1976 Continental Mark IV Givenchy Designer Series

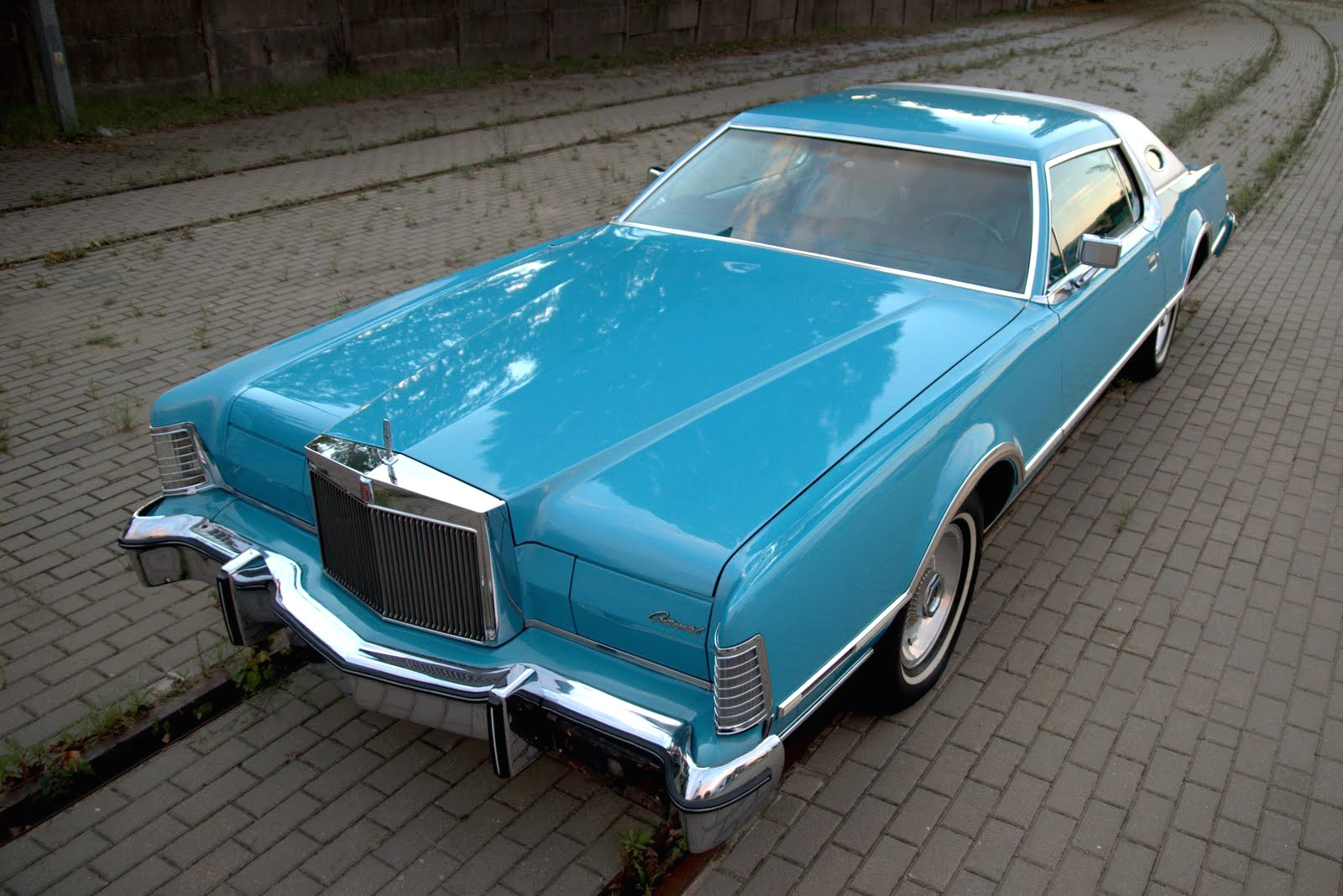
Front 3/4

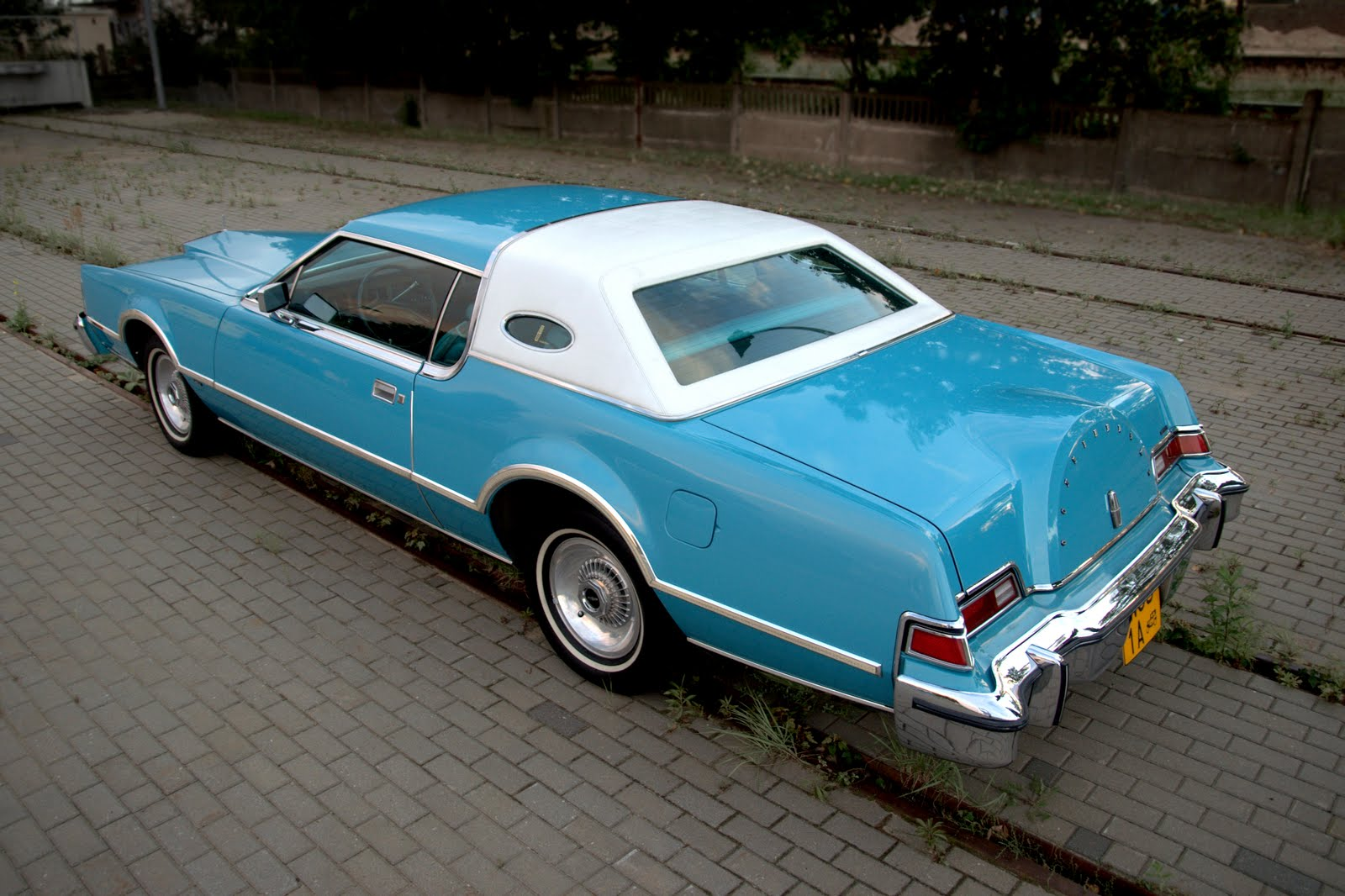
Rear 3/4

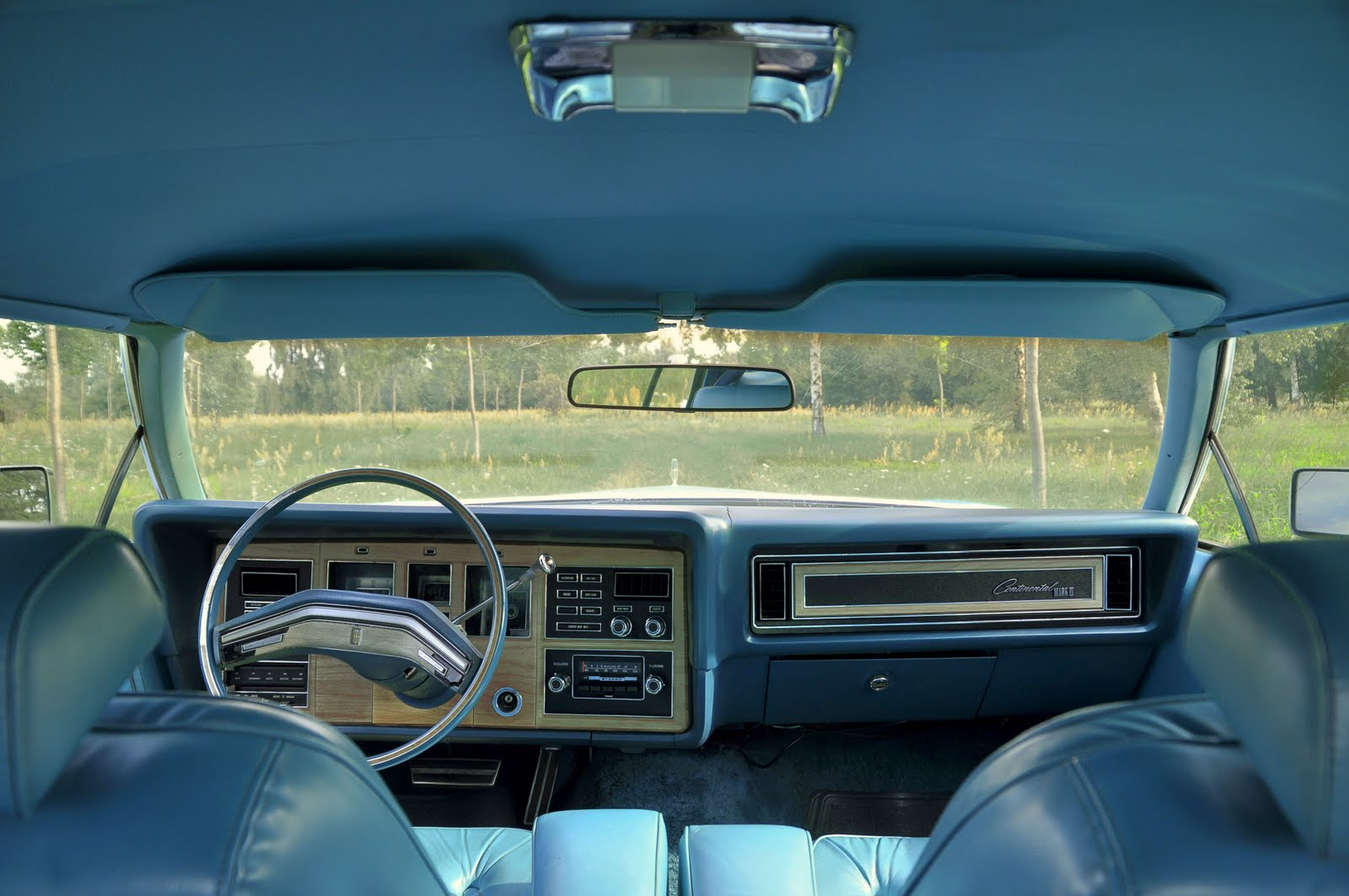
Interior

== Sales and pricing ==
A total of 278,599 Mark IV's were produced:

Year	Production	Price (USD)
1972	48,591	$8,640 ($66,501 in 2025 dollars)
1973	69,437	$8,984 ($65,158 in 2025 dollars)
1974	57,316	$10,194 ($66,550 in 2025 dollars)
1975	47,145	$11,082 ($66,307 in 2025 dollars)
1976	56,110	$11,060 ($62,576 in 2025 dollars)

== Specifications (1976 model) ==
	US	Metric	vs. Mark III
Wheelbase	120.4 in	3058 mm	+2.7%
Overall length	228.1 in	5791 mm	+1.9%
Width	79.8 in	2027 mm	+0.5%
Height	53.5 in	1359 mm	+1.1%
Weight	5,264 lb	2,388 kg	+11.1%
Engine	Ford 385 series V8
Displacement	460 in^{3}	7.5 L
Bore × stroke	4.36 × 3.85 in	111 × 98 mm
Power (SAE)	202 hp	148 kW	@ 3800 rpm
Torque	356 lbf·ft	482 Nm	@ 2200 rpm
Compression	8.0:1
Carburetor	Motorcraft 4350
Transmission	Ford C6 3-speed automatic
