= Ford Thunderbird (sixth generation) =

Ford Thunderbird Sixth generation
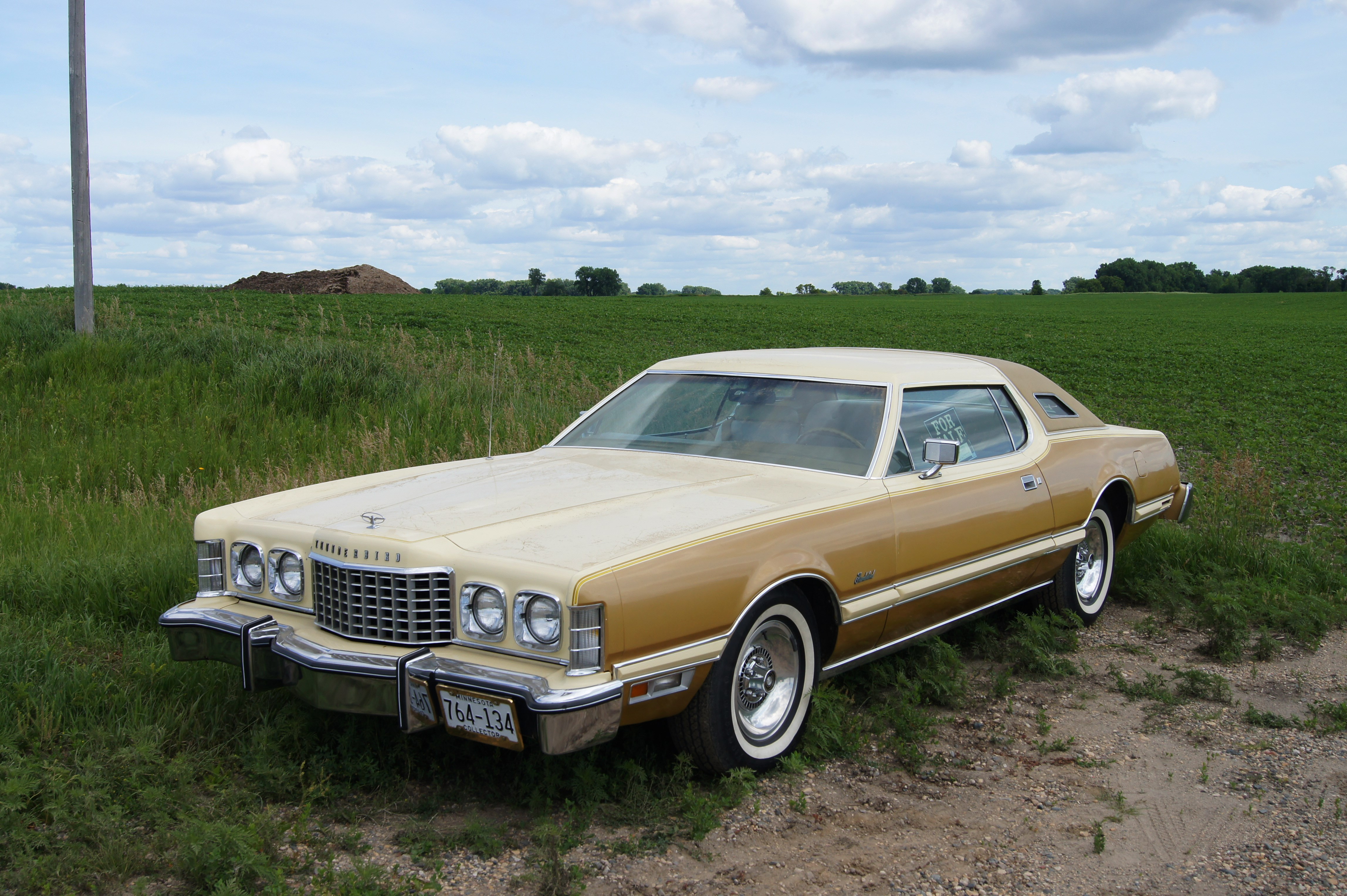
- 1976 Ford Thunderbird

Overview
- Manufacturer: Ford Motor Company
- Production: 1972–1976
- Assembly: United States: Wixom, Michigan; Pico Rivera, California

Body and chassis
- Class: Personal luxury car
- Body style: 2-door hardtop coupe
- Layout: Front-engine, rear-wheel-drive
- Chassis: body-on-frame
- Related: Continental Mark IV

Powertrain
- Engine: 400 cu in (6.6 L) 400 V8; 429 cu in (7.0 L) 385 V8; 460 cu in (7.5 L) 385 V8
- Transmission: 3-speed Cruise-o-Matic automatic

Dimensions
- Wheelbase: 120.4 in (3,058 mm)
- Length: 225 in (5,715 mm)
- Width: 79.7 in (2,024 mm)
- Curb weight: 5,000 lb (2,268 kg)

Chronology
- Predecessor: Ford Thunderbird (fifth generation)
- Successor: Ford Thunderbird (seventh generation)

The sixth generation of the Ford Thunderbird is a large personal luxury coupe that was produced by Ford for the 1972 to 1976 model years. A sibling of the Continental Mark IV, this generation of the Thunderbird was the largest ever produced; weighing in at over 5,000 pounds (2,268 kg), they are also the heaviest coupes ever produced by Ford (aside from its Mark IV sibling car).

In terms of styling, the sixth-generation Thunderbird would heavily influence the styling of the 1974–1976 Mercury Cougar XR7 and Ford Elite, the latter of which was replaced by the seventh-generation Thunderbird in 1977.

== 1972 ==
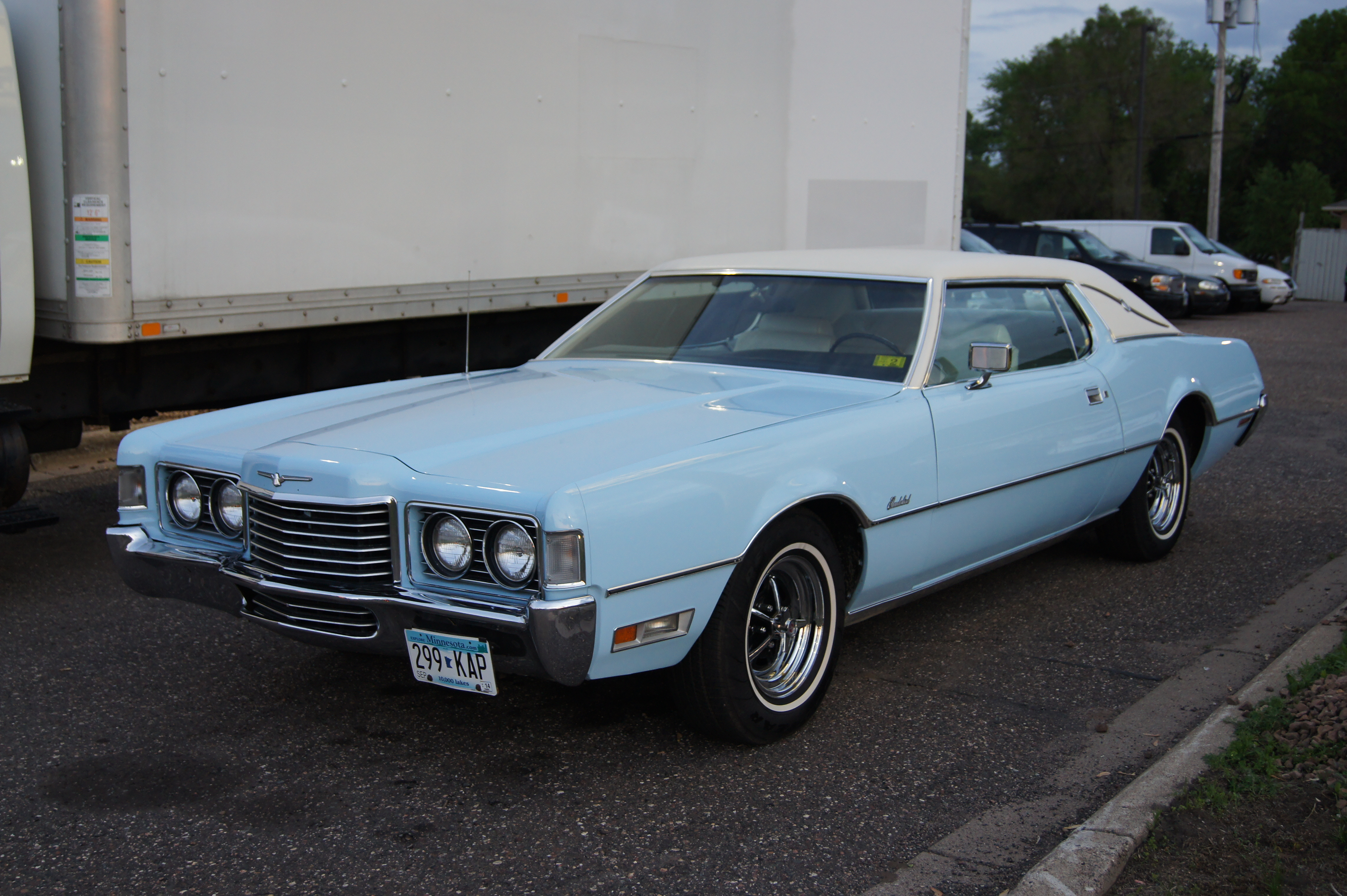
1972 Ford Thunderbird

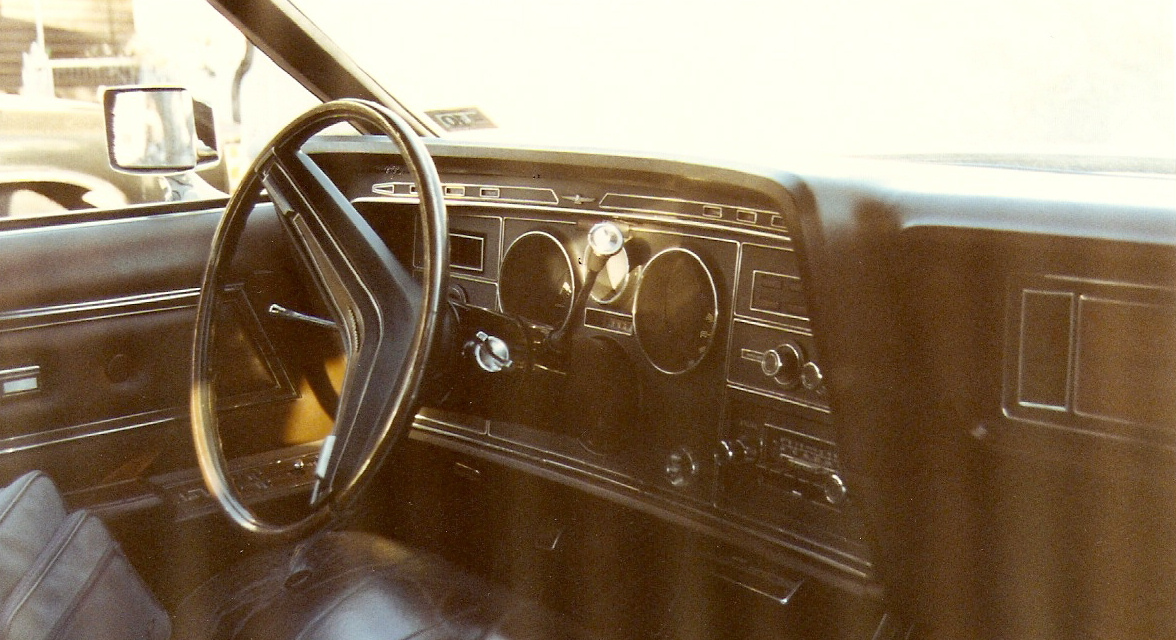
The interior featuring round dials and clock would remain the same until the end of the 1976 model year

Aside from the redesign itself, the 1972 Thunderbird represented a simplification of body styles. Instead of the two body styles (two-door and four-door landau sedan) offered for the 1971 model year, the Thunderbird was pared down to a single two-door hardtop model line. Exterior wise, many components were common with the Continental Mark IV, with the primary differences being the front and rear body panels. The controversial prominent “beak” introduced for the 1970 model year was toned down while the sequential turn signals seen since 1965 were deleted for cost saving reasons.

The base engine was the 400 Cleveland engine, though this engine was very uncommon, and most Thunderbirds were instead equipped with the 429-4 (Ford 385 Series) or 460.

Aside from the dashboard, the interior was also shared with the Mark IV. Instead of the square gauges used by the Mark IV, the Thunderbird used round dials for the speedometer, fuel gauge, and clock. To the driver’s left were the climate control controls and the light controls; to the right were the radio controls, wiper controls, and information center. This dash layout would remain through the 1976 model year. Base price was US$5,293 ($40,740 in 2025 dollars) and a total of 57,814 cars were built for this model year.

== 1973 ==
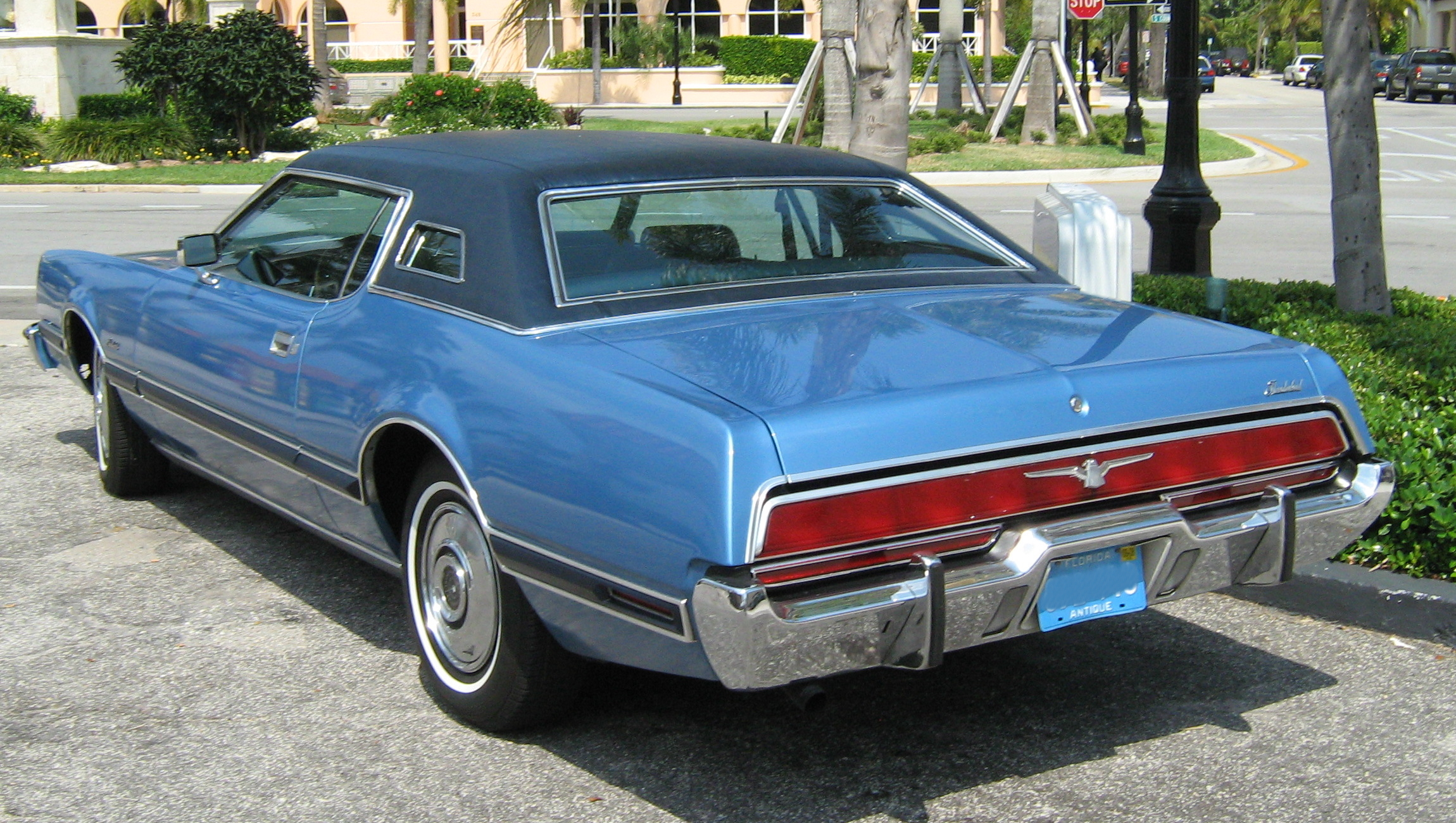
1973 Ford Thunderbird, rear view

For 1973, Thunderbird increased both in size and price. To accommodate the larger 5 mph bumpers mandated for all 1973 automobiles, the front was restyled with an egg crate grille, topped by a spring-loaded hood ornament, flanked by the quad headlight in individual nacelles. The turn signals were more prominent at the fender edges. Also new to the exterior were opera windows, first optional, then standard late in the model year. Power windows ($129), vinyl roof ($141), manual air conditioning ($436), and tinted glass ($51), were also made standard during the model year. Some new options included AM/FM 8-track tape player ($311), remote control right hand outside mirror ($26), and an anti-theft system ($79). Some optional equipment available included sure-track brakes, an early anti-lock braking system ($197), power sunroof ($504), power door locks ($59), cruise control ($103) and the 460 cu in (7.5 L) V8 ($76).

1973 was the last year for the 429 and leaded gas. Base price was $5,577 ($40,448 in 2025 dollars) early in the model year and $6,414 ($46,518 in 2025 dollars) later due to additions to the standard equipment list. A total of 87,269 cars were built, making this the third highest production figure to date.

== 1974 ==
1974 saw more changes made in response to new federal regulations. Replacing the seatbelt interlock, a buzzer would sound if both front seatbelts weren't buckled; the addition of 5-mph bumpers to the rear added still more curb weight. While the 429 V8 was replaced by the more powerful 460 V8 sourced from Lincoln-Mercury, it now required the use of unleaded gasoline; a low-fuel warning light was added to the dashboard. The gas filler door was moved from behind the license plate to the driver's side rear panel. While looking similar to the 1960s sequential taillights, the new-full width taillights were of a conventional design separated by a central reverse light.

1974 was the first year for special luxury group trim options, the burgundy luxury group ($411) and the white and gold luxury group ($546). These groups added upgraded paint and exterior and interior trim. Standard equipment remained unchanged but there were several new items listed as optional. Some of the most notable, and costly, included power moon roof ($798), auto lamp for automatic on/off of headlights ($34), and power mini-vent windows ($70). AM/FM stereo ($152) or with tape player ($311), power drivers seat ($105), dual power front seats ($210), rear window defroster ($85), power antenna ($31), automatic temperature control ($74), and front cornering lights ($43) also appeared on the option list.

Base price was US$7,221 ($47,141 in 2025 dollars) and 58,443 cars were produced for the model year.

== 1975 ==
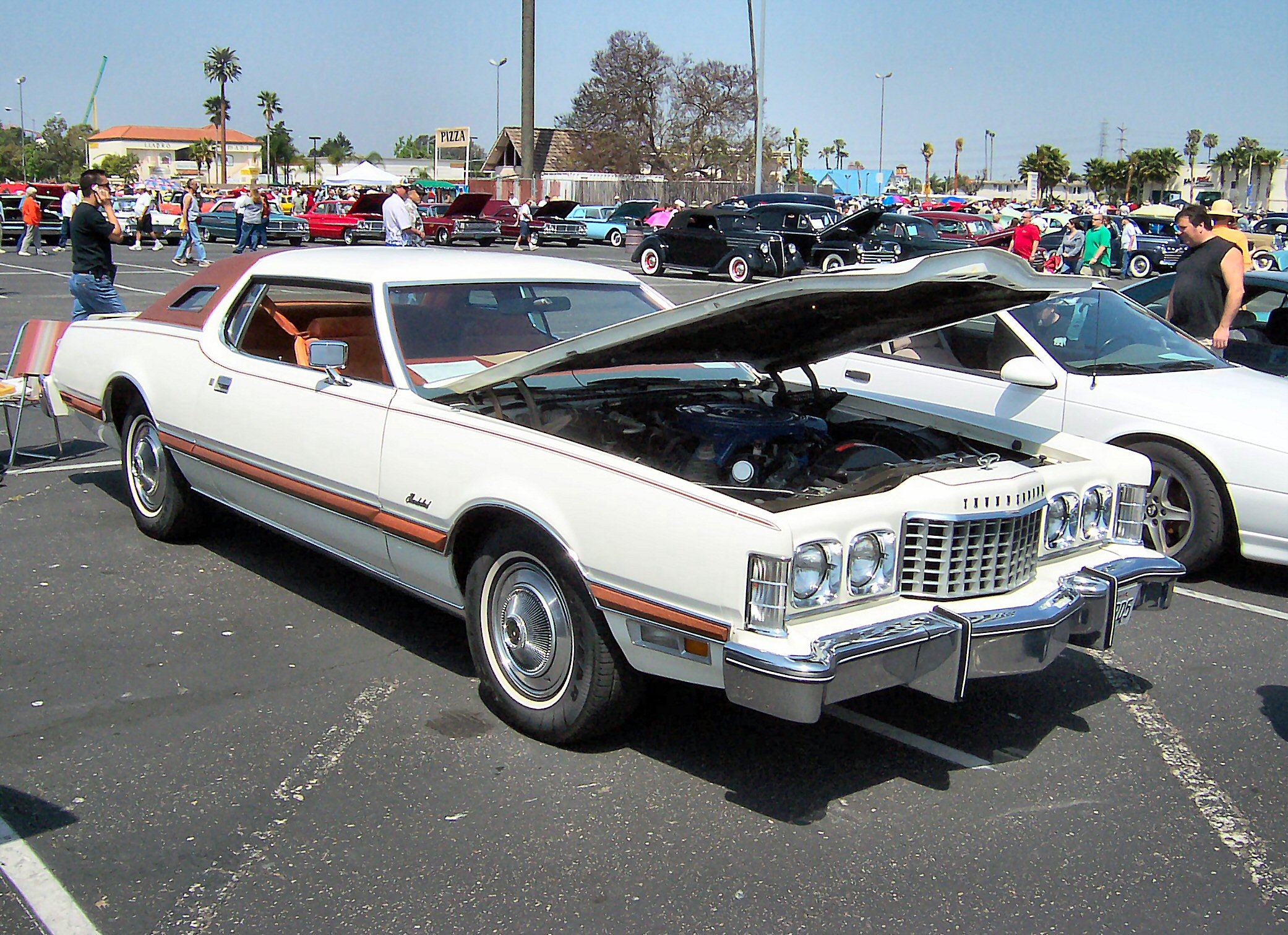
1975 Ford Thunderbird

Little changed for 1975 save new luxury groups and more items added to the standard equipment list. The widely hated seatbelt alarms were dropped. 1975 had the most extensive list of standard equipment of any year Thunderbird from 1955 to 1997. Some items made standard this year were AM/FM stereo, front cornering lights, and front and rear stabilizer bars. The special editions luxury groups returned, being named copper luxury group ($624), silver luxury group ($337), and jade luxury group ($624). The wide range options available changed little but four wheel disc brakes ($184) were available for the time. Power was still supplied by the 460 cu in (7.5 L) V8 rated at 220 horsepower (160 kW). Base price was $7,701 ($46,077 in 2025 dollars) with a production of 42,685. An alarm system became optional.

== 1976 ==
1976 was the last model year for the sixth generation. Some items that were standard in 1975 were moved to the options list. Some items returning to the option list included, AM/FM stereo, front cornering lights, and tinted glass. Additionally the rear windows became stationary. This move was to keep cost down and was also shared by the 1976 Mark IV. The 1976 luxury groups were Creme and Gold ($793), Lipstick ($546), and Bordeaux ($700). New options included driver's lighted vanity mirror ($43), power lumbar drivers seat ($86), AM/FM stereo search radio ($298), and AM/FM stereo radio with Quadra sonic 8-track tape player ($382). An auto dimmer was added to the autolamp option. Base price was $7,790 ($44,075 in 2025 dollars) with a total of 52,935 cars produced.

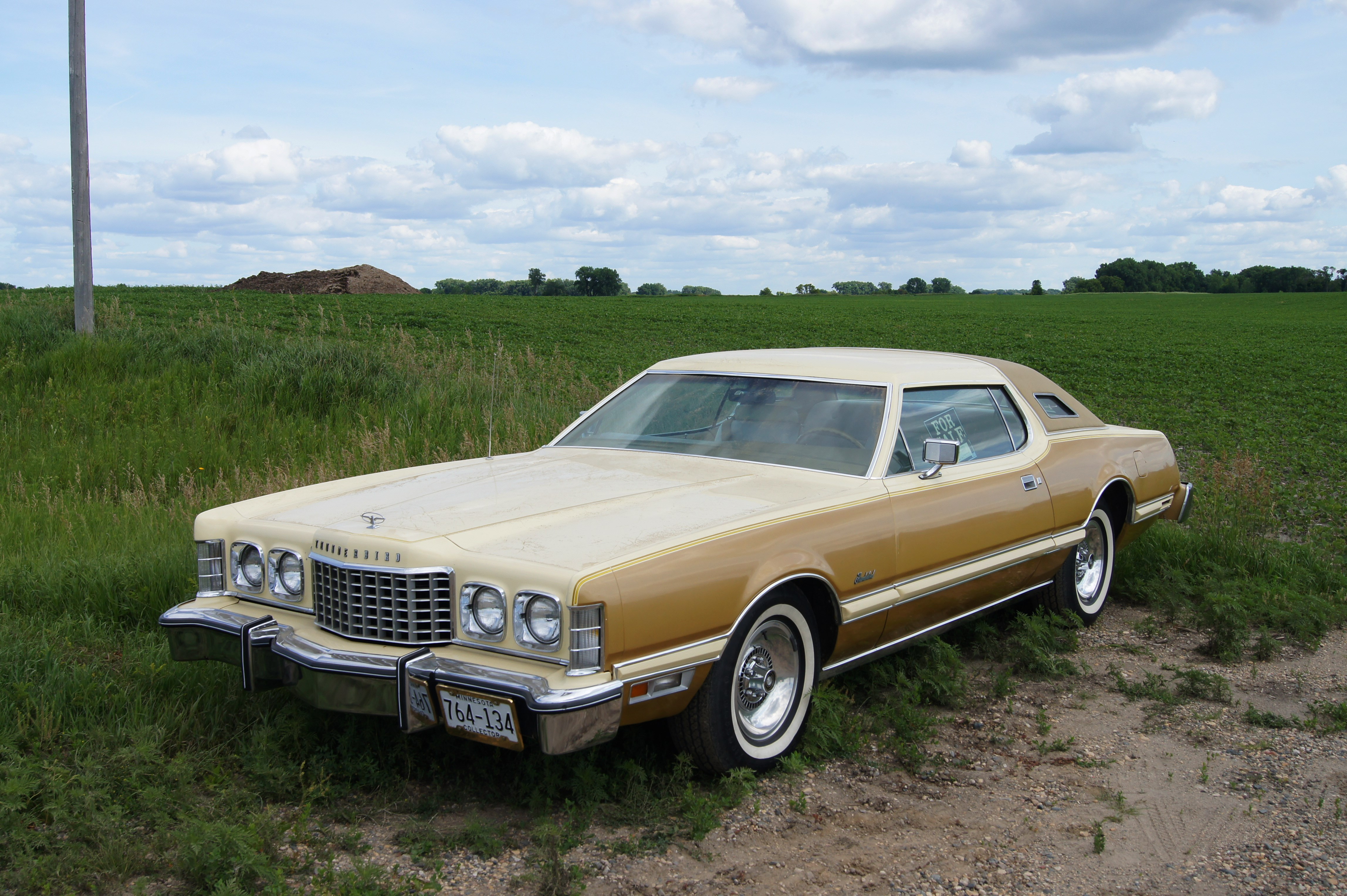
1976 Ford Thunderbird with the Creme and Gold luxury package

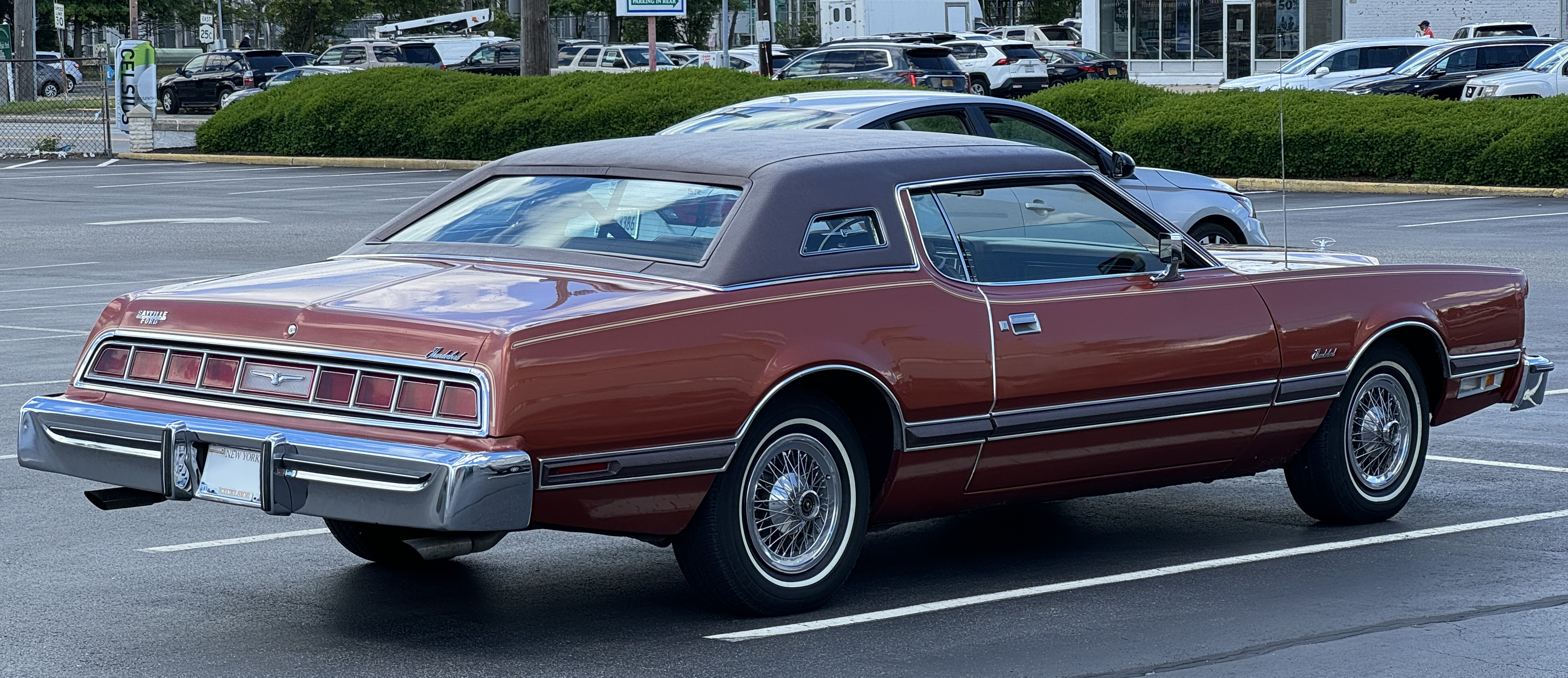
Rear view

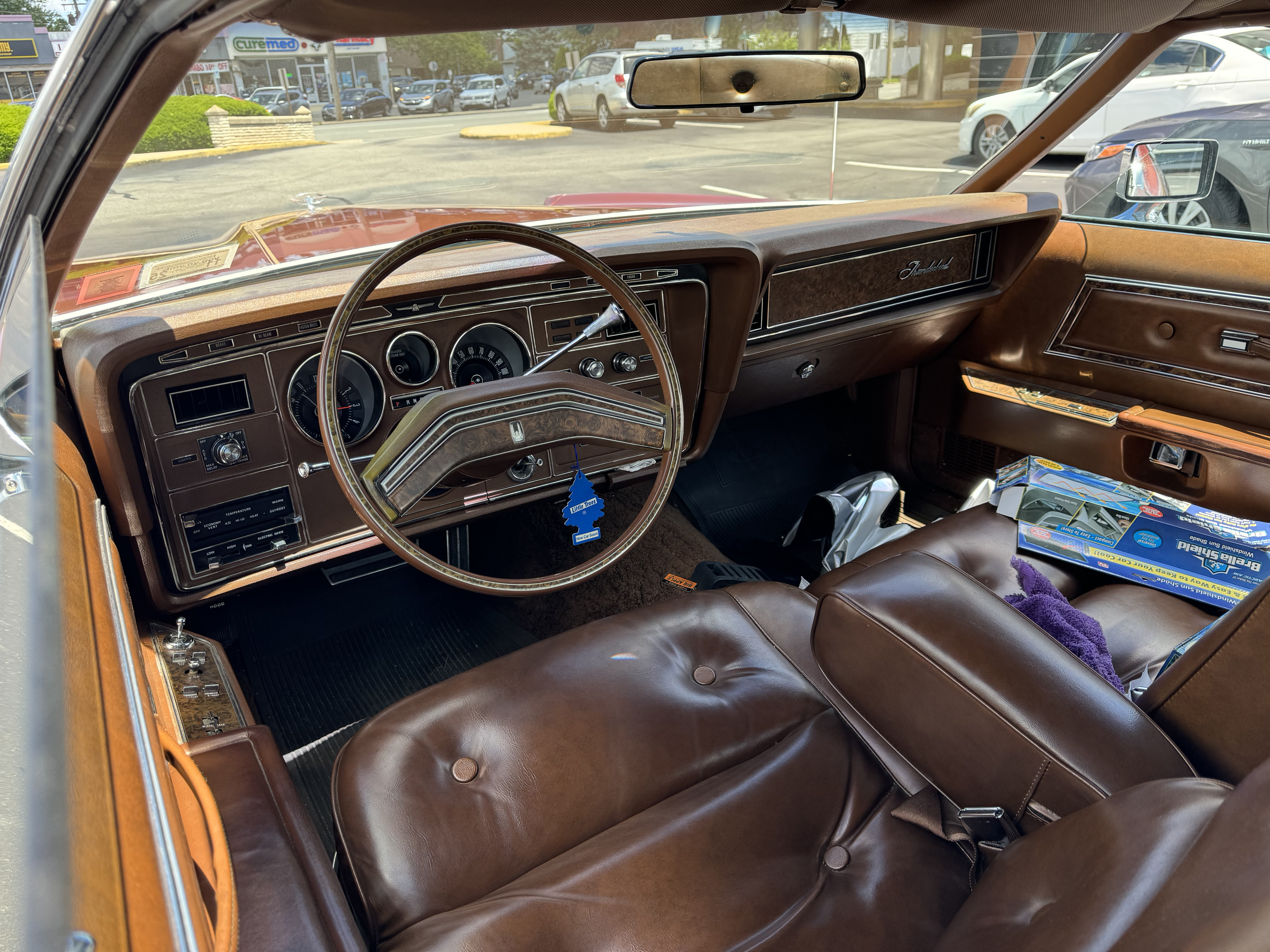
Interior

== Production totals ==
Year	Production
1972	57,814
1973	87,269
1974	58,443
1975	42,685
1976	52,935
Total production = 299,146
