= Wixom Assembly Plant =

Defunct Ford Motor Company assembly plant

Coordinates: 42°30′14″N 83°32′27″W

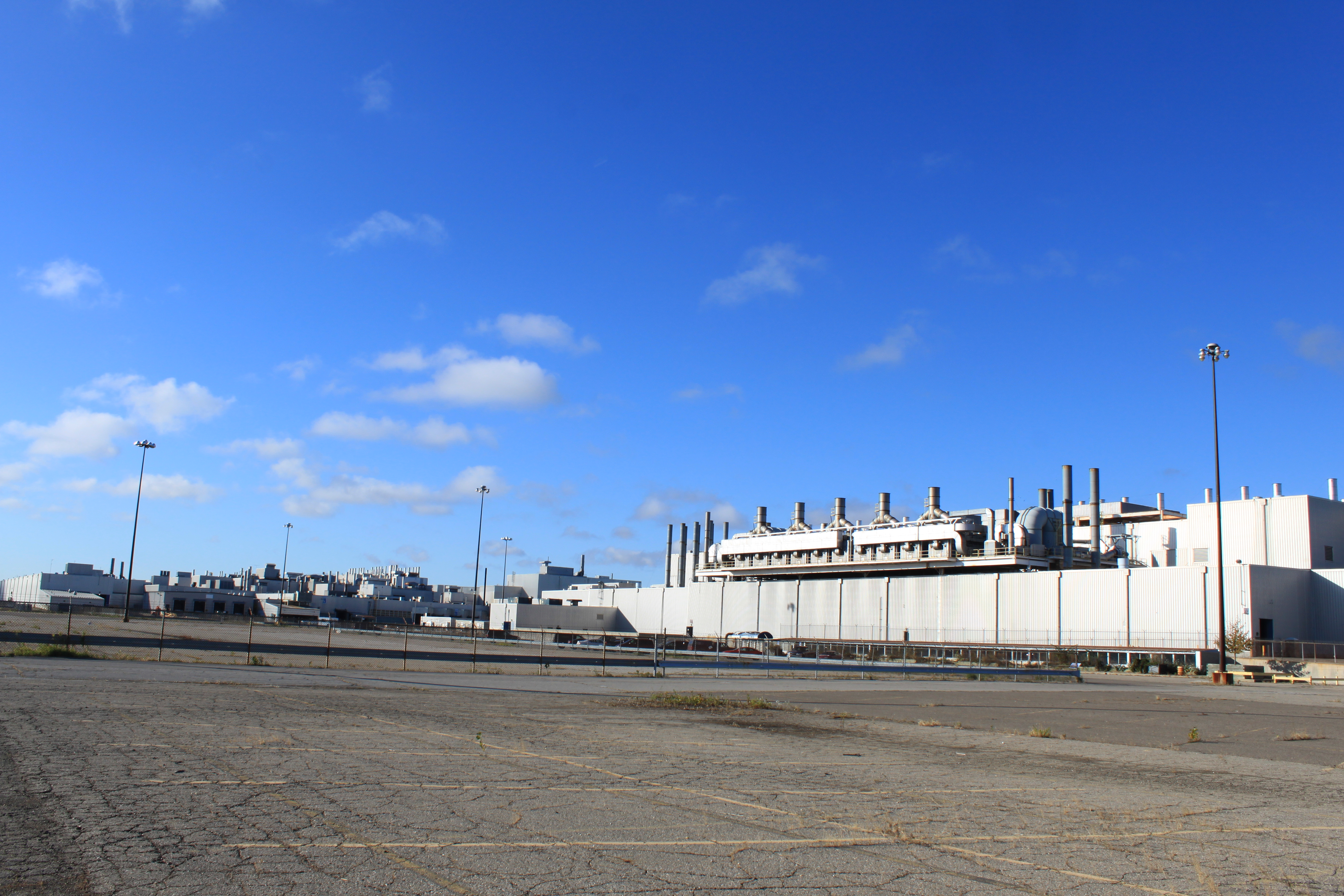
- Operated: 1957–2007
- Location: 28801 South Wixom Road; Wixom, Michigan, United States
- Industry: Automotive
- Products: Lincoln Town Car
- Employees: 1,000 (2007)
- Area: 317 acres (1.28 km^{2})
- Volume: 4,700,000 square feet (440,000 m^{2})
- Owner: Ford Motor Company

The Ford Wixom Assembly Plant was a Ford Motor Company manufacturing facility in Wixom, Michigan, with production reaching 6,648,806 over the fifty years it was operational (1957–2007).

== History ==
Wixom opened April 15, 1957, replacing the former Lincoln Motor Company Plant at 6200 West Warren Avenue (at Livernois). It eventually expanded to 4.7 million square feet, becoming one of Ford's largest manufacturing sites. The first car manufactured August 1, 1957 was the Lincoln Capri, and the last was a white chocolate Lincoln Town Car which rolled off the line at 12:55 pm on May 31, 2007.

On November 14, 1996, an army veteran opened fire at the plant, killing a manager and injuring another three before being arrested.

The plant only created components and manufactured complete Lincoln cars, as well as the Ford Thunderbird — along with the Ford GT40 of the 1960s and the Ford GT of the 2000s. Components were also shipped in knock-down kits and sent to only two dedicated branch assembly locations in California. Production of the Lincoln LS ended in early April 2006 and production of the Ford GT stopped on September 21, leaving the Town Car as the plant's final Ford Motor Company product.

Wixom was the most profitable plant in the industry during the 1980s when Cadillac downsized its lineup and lost ground to Lincoln. Due to Lincoln's falling sales, Ford announced on January 23, 2006, it would sell the Wixom plant in 2007 as part of its The Way Forward. Some analysts argued that the plant might not be closed. A report in The Oakland Press said "the fate of the Wixom plant, however, will depend on the shape of Ford's future product plan, which seems to be currently in flux." Michigan governor Jennifer Granholm reportedly offered $115 million in tax cuts to keep the plant open. The plant was closed in 2007, and by mid-June 2008, while Ford was able to find buyers for other idled plants, Wixom remained unsold.

Several alternative energy uses were announced, but none came to fruition. In 2012, Ford began demolishing the plant. The next year the Baidas family, owners and operators of General RV Center, sought and were awarded mixed use zoning permits in an area nearby of the Wixom property. In 2014 the family broke ground on 33 acres near the Wixom property to build a new corporate headquarters and RV Dealership. A Menards outlet has also been built on the site.

== Products ==
- 1958–1959 Lincoln Capri
- 1958–1960 Lincoln Premiere
- 1960 Lincoln
- 1958–1960 Continental Mark III, IV & V
- 1958–1976 Ford Thunderbird
- 1961–2002 Lincoln Continental
- 1964–1969 Ford GT40 Mk IV
- 1969–1971 Continental Mark III
- 1972–1976 Continental Mark IV
- 1977–1979 Continental Mark V
- 1980–1983 Continental Mark VI
- 1981–2007 Lincoln Town Car
- 1984–1985 Continental Mark VII
- 1986–1992 Lincoln Mark VII
- 1993–1998 Lincoln Mark VIII
- 2000–2006 Lincoln LS
- 2002–2005 Ford Thunderbird
- 2005–2006 Ford GT

== See also ==
- List of Ford factories
