= List of Lincoln vehicles =

This is a list of both production and concept vehicles of the Lincoln and Continental divisions of Ford Motor Company of the United States and Canada. For other vehicles produced by Ford Motor Company see: List of Ford vehicles, List of Mercury vehicles, Edsel, Frontenac, Merkur, Meteor, Monarch.

== Current production vehicles ==
Model	Calendar year introduced	Current model		Vehicle description
Model	Calendar year introduced	Introduction	Update/facelift	Vehicle description
Sedans
Z	2022	2022	–	Executive/Mid-size luxury car, closely related to the Ford Mondeo. Exclusively sold in China.
SUVs/Crossovers
Aviator	2002	2019	2025	Mid-size luxury crossover SUV, closely related to the Ford Explorer.
Aviator EX8	2026	2026	–	Mid-size luxury crossover SUV. Exclusively sold in China.
Corsair	2019	2019	2027	Compact luxury crossover SUV, closely related to the Ford Escape.
Nautilus	2019	2024	2027	Mid-size luxury crossover SUV, closely related to the Ford Edge. Formerly the Lincoln MKX until 2018. Imported to America from China for second generation.
Navigator	1997	2025	–	Full-size luxury SUV, closely related to the Ford Expedition.
Navigator L	2006	2025	–	Long Wheelbase version of Lincoln Navigator. The largest non-limousine vehicle ever produced by Lincoln.

== Former production vehicles ==
=== Automobiles ===
Image	Model	Intr.	Disc.	Gen.	Description
	L series	1922	1930	1	The first automobile produced by Lincoln
	K series	1931	1940	1	
	Zephyr	1936	1942	1	Mid-size
	Continental	1939 1958 2017	1948 2002 2020	10	Mid-sized and full-sized luxury car
	Custom	1941; 1955	1942 1955	1	Sold in touring sedan and limousine versions
	EL-Series	1949	1951	1	Full-size luxury car
	Cosmopolitan	1949	1954	2	
	Capri	1952	1959	3	Introduced as a premium trim variant of the two-door Lincoln Cosmopolitan
	Premiere	1956	1960	1	Full-size car
	Continental Mark II	1957	1957	1	Marketed by the Continental division of Ford; technically, "not a Lincoln"
	Continental Mark III	1969	1971	1	Personal luxury car
	Continental Mark IV	1971	1976	1	Personal luxury car
	Continental Mark V	1977	1979	1	Personal luxury car
	Versailles	1977	1980	1	Mid-size car
	Continental Mark VI	1980	1983	1	Personal luxury car
	Continental Mark VII	1984	1992	1	Personal luxury car; switched to the simpler name "Mark VII" in 1984
	Town Car	1981	2011	3	Full-size sedan
	Mark VIII	1993	1998	1	Personal luxury car
	LS	1999	2006	1	Sedan
	MKX	2006	2018	2	mid-size crossover SUV
	MKZ	2006	2020	2	mid-size sedan
	MKS	2008	2016	1	full-size sedan
	MKT	2010	2019	1	Crossover SUV
	MKC	2014	2019	1	Compact crossover

=== Trucks ===
Image	Model	Intr.	Disc.	Gen.	Description
	Blackwood	2001	2002	1	Pickup truck
	Mark LT	2006	2008	2	Pickup truck, continued production in Mexico, 2006–14

== Concept models ==
- Lincoln Continental 1950-X (1952)
- Lincoln Anniversary (1953)
- Lincoln Maharaja (1953)
- Lincoln XL-500 (1953)
- Lincoln Mardi Gras (1954)
- Lincoln Futura (1955)
- Lincoln Indianapolis (1955)
- Lincoln Continental Town Brougham (1964–1965)
- Lincoln Coronation (1966)
- Lincoln Coronation II (1967)
- Lincoln Continental Town Sedan (1969)
- Continental Mark III Dual Cowl Phaeton (1970)
- Lincoln Continental Concept 90 (1982)
- Lincoln Continental Concept 100 (1983)
- Lincoln Quicksilver Ghia (1983)
- Lincoln Vignale (1987)
- Lincoln Machete (1988)
- Lincoln Marque X (1992)
- Lincoln Contempra (1994)
- Lincoln L2K (1995)
- Lincoln Sentinel (1996)
- Lincoln Special LS (1999)
- Lincoln MK9 (2001)
- Lincoln Continental (2002)
- Lincoln Navicross (2003)
- Lincoln Mark X (2004)
- Lincoln MKR (2007)
- Lincoln C (2009)
- Lincoln MKZ (2012)
- Lincoln MKC (2013)
- Lincoln Continental (2015)
- Lincoln Aviator (2018)
- Lincoln Zephyr (2021)
- Lincoln Star (2022)
- Lincoln Model L100 (2022)
