= Lincoln Mark series =

Continental Mark Series
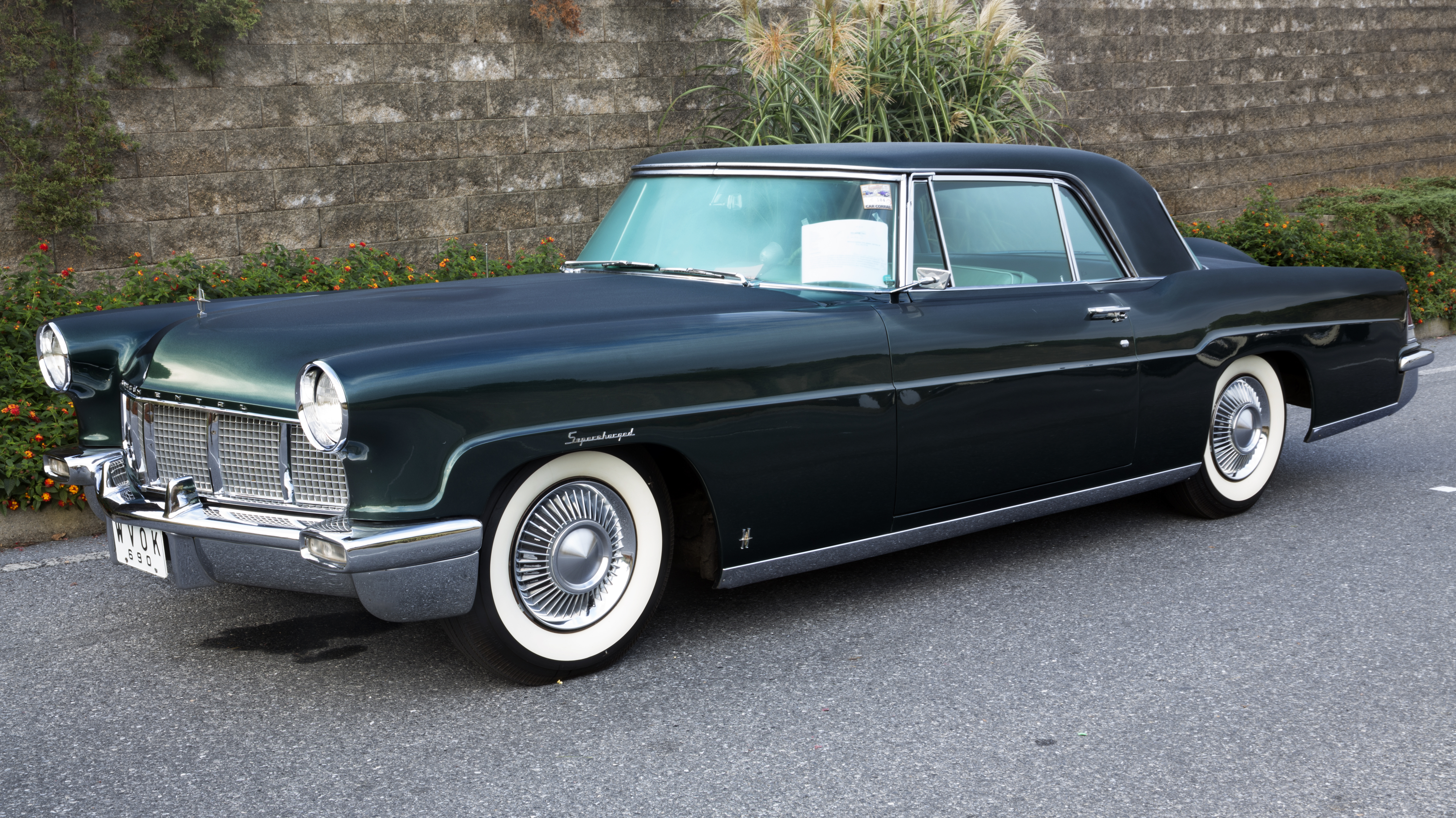
- 1956 Continental Mark II

Overview
- Manufacturer: Continental (Ford) (1956–1957); Lincoln (Ford) (July 1957–1960, 1968–1998)
- Production: 1956–1960; 1969–1998

Body and chassis
- Class: Full-size personal luxury car
- Body style: 2-door coupe 4-door sedan (1958–1960, 1980–1983); 2-door convertible (1958–1960)
- Layout: FR layout

Chronology
- Predecessor: Lincoln Continental (1940–1948)
- Successor: Lincoln LS

The Continental Mark series (later renamed Lincoln Mark series) is a series of personal luxury cars that was produced by Ford Motor Company from 1956 to 1960 and from the 1969 to 1998 model years. Serving as the flagship vehicle for Ford Motor Company, the model line derived its heritage from the 1940–1948 Lincoln Continental, a model line that established the personal luxury car segment.

The Mark series was inaugurated with the 1956–1957 Continental Mark II, which was the first (and only) product line of the Continental Division, which was introduced to provide Ford Motor Company a luxury car brand slotted above Lincoln (with the Mark II serving as the most expensive car sold in the United States). Produced for approximately a year, the hand-built Mark II lent several design elements that would be adopted for the rest of the model line: a two-door coupe design (with few exceptions), a continental tire trunklid design (derived from the spare tire mounting of the 1940s Lincoln Continental), and a four-point star emblem; in revised form, the emblem remains in use by Lincoln today.

Following the retirement of the Continental Division, the Mark series became the flagship Lincoln (but not branded as such) from 1958 to 1960. After a hiatus from 1961 to 1968, the series was restarted again, becoming the Continental Mark III for 1969, serving in a similar role (though far less expensive) than the previous Mark II. Instead of competing against Rolls-Royce, the Mark III commenced a flagship brand rivalry with the Cadillac Eldorado. The new design adopted a similar configuration as its Mark II predecessor, returning a spare-tire trunklid design feature and a hardtop coupe roofline. Following the Mark IV and Mark V (some of the largest two-door coupes ever produced), the downsized 1980 Mark VI introduced a four-door sedan to the line. The 1984 Mark VII was downsized further, becoming a mid-size car; along with reverting to a coupe-only line, the Mark VII saw its spare-tire trunklid decrease in size (in the interest of aerodynamics). For 1986, Ford ended all brand confusion related to the Mark series, with the Mark VII officially adopting the Lincoln nameplate in both marketing and on an official basis. The 1993 Lincoln Mark VIII became far sleeker and saw substantial upgrades to its chassis and powertrain.

With the exception of the hand-built Continental Mark II and the 1958–1960 Continental Mark III–Mark V, the Mark series has shared chassis underpinnings with other Ford or Lincoln-Mercury vehicles. The 1969–1979 Mark III, Mark IV, and Mark V are counterparts of the 1969–1976 Ford Thunderbird, while the Mark VI uses the Ford Panther platform. The Mark VII uses the Ford Fox platform (shared with the 1980 Ford Thunderbird and Mercury Cougar XR-7), while the Mark VIII is a variant of the 1989 Ford Thunderbird/Mercury Cougar.

Following the 1998 model year, Lincoln discontinued the Mark VIII, serving as the final generation of the model line. During the 1990s, buyer demand for personal luxury cars had declined, as luxury car buyers shifted towards four-door sedans and luxury SUVs; buyers of coupes shifted towards smaller, higher-performance cars. While the Mark series has not currently been replaced, from 2017 to 2020, Lincoln briefly revived the Continental (discontinued after 2002) as its premium sedan.

From 1958 to 1998, Mark series vehicles were produced alongside Lincolns by Wixom Assembly at Wixom, Michigan.

== Background ==
Prior to the Continental/Lincoln Mark series, within Ford Motor Company, the Continental nameplate began life in 1939, following the design of a custom-built Lincoln-Zephyr convertible commissioned by Edsel Ford. Modified extensively over a production vehicle, the personal car had a lowered hoodline, a relocated passenger compartment (requiring an external-mount spare tire), and deletion of the running boards. Upon taking delivery of the car in Florida, Ford discovered the vehicle generated a high degree of interest from potential buyers; renamed Continental by Ford, the name reflected European styling influences for its design.

At the end of the 1930s, Lincoln was transitioning away from the exclusive Lincoln K-series and moving towards the more contemporary and affordable Lincoln-Zephyr coupes and sedans. As a flagship, Edsel Ford wanted to revive the popularity of the 1929–1932 Lincoln Victoria coupe and convertible with an updated approach, reflecting European styling influences.

=== Continental Division ===
For 1949, the Lincoln Continental was discontinued, as Ford sought to introduce post-war model lines for all three of its divisions. In 1952, the company commenced design work on a successor model line; following the 1953 introduction of the limited-production Cadillac Eldorado, Buick Skylark, and Oldsmobile Fiesta, Ford also sought to create a competitor, aiming to make a model line as exclusive as the 1930s K-series.

As its new model line was to be one of the most exclusive and expensive automobiles in the world, Ford chose to create a stand-alone division positioned above Lincoln in 1955, the same year Chrysler introduced the Imperial Division. The namesake of the 1940s Lincoln Continental, the Continental Division named its model line the Mark II. Along with aligning it as a successor to the pre-war Lincoln Continental, the Mark II designation was a convention used by European industry; along with automobiles (i.e., Jaguar Mark 1), similar nomenclature was used to identify versions of artillery, tanks, naval vessels, and aircraft.

In July 1956, Ford integrated Continental into Lincoln-Mercury, which marketed Continental as a marque positioned above Lincoln; the Mark II was withdrawn after the 1957 model year. From 1958 to 1960, Continental remained in a similar role, replacing the Mark II with the Mark III, Mark IV, and Mark V as flagship vehicles above the Lincoln sedan line.

For 1961, Lincoln-Mercury consolidated the Lincoln model line with a singular Lincoln Continental replacing the Continental Mark V and both Lincoln model lines; the division would serve this single line of Lincoln sedans through the 1976 model year.

=== Continental Mark revival ===
In response to the introduction of the two-door Rolls-Royce Silver Shadow (later renamed the Corniche) in the United States, Ford vice-president Lee Iacocca directed Ford vice president of design Gene Bordinat to "put a Rolls-Royce grille on a Thunderbird" in September 1965. Not branded a Lincoln, the all-new model line was effectively a reboot of the Continental Mark series, adopting the Continental Mark III nomenclature as a direct successor to Continental Mark II (leaving the 1958–1960 Mark series aside). In line with the design directive, the Mark III adopted a large radiator-style grille and was a large two-door coupe (using the frame of the four-door Thunderbird). While no longer intended as a functional feature, the Continental spare-tire trunklid made its return as a styling feature to further distinguish the model line.

While less expensive than its Rolls-Royce design inspiration, the Mark III competed against premium luxury coupes from American manufacturers, including the Imperial Crown Coupe and the Cadillac Eldorado; the latter two model lines formed a model rivalry lasting through multiple model generations.

Following the Mark III, Ford developed five successive generations of the model line. During the 1970s, the Mark IV and the Mark V shared a chassis with the Ford Thunderbird through 1976; the Mark V was a substantial revision of the Mark IV. The 1980 Mark VI was the first model to undergo downsizing, adopting the full-size Ford Panther platform; a four-door sedan was offered for the first time since 1958–1960. The Mark VII was downsized further for 1984, sharing the Ford Fox platform with the Ford Thunderbird, Mercury Cougar and Lincoln Continental sedan; the model was offered only as a coupe. The Lincoln Mark VIII grew slightly in size for 1993, derived again from the Ford Thunderbird and Mercury Cougar.

== First generation (Mark II; 1956–1957) ==
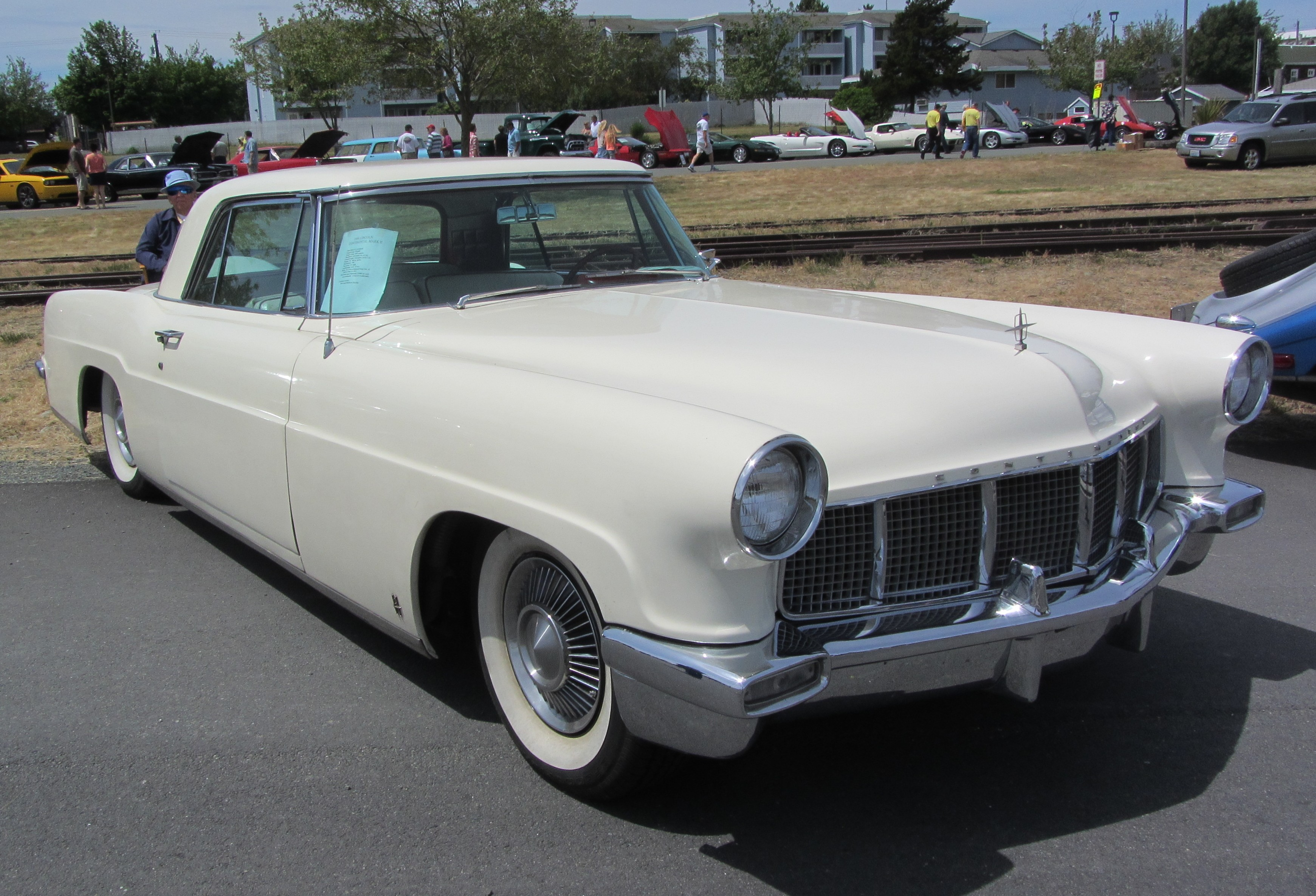
1956 Continental Mark II

From the 1956 model year, Ford Motor Company and its Lincoln division introduced the Continental Mark II as the inaugural offering of their new flagship Continental Division. A two-door personal luxury car, the Mark II was developed as the successor model line for the 1939–1948 Lincoln Continental. Largely hand-assembled, the $10,000 (US$118,421 in 2025 dollars) model line was the most expensive American vehicle sold in 1956, competing against Chrysler's new for 1955 Imperial top marque – matching even Rolls-Royce in price (or two new Cadillacs). Air conditioning was the only optional extra.

The Mark II returned the long-hood, short-deck exterior design of its predecessor, reviving its rear spare tire design feature as part of the trunklid (the design was partly functional, as the trunklid closed around the vertically mounted spare tire). In contrast to many American (and some European) vehicles, the exterior was highly conservative, limiting chrome trim to the grille, window trim, bumpers, and badging.

During 1956, Continental was integrated into Lincoln, leaving the Mark II coupe as the only model line of the Continental Division. In spite of its status as the most expensive vehicle sold in the United States, the high cost of its assembly led Ford to lose over $1000 for each Mark II produced, leading to its discontinuation after the 1957 model year. In response to the Mark II, Cadillac released the Cadillac Eldorado Brougham; while far different in design, the Eldorado Brougham was the first Cadillac to rival the model line directly, leading to a rivalry that would last through the 1998 Lincoln Mark VIII.

== Successor (Mark III, Mark IV, Mark V; 1958–1960) ==
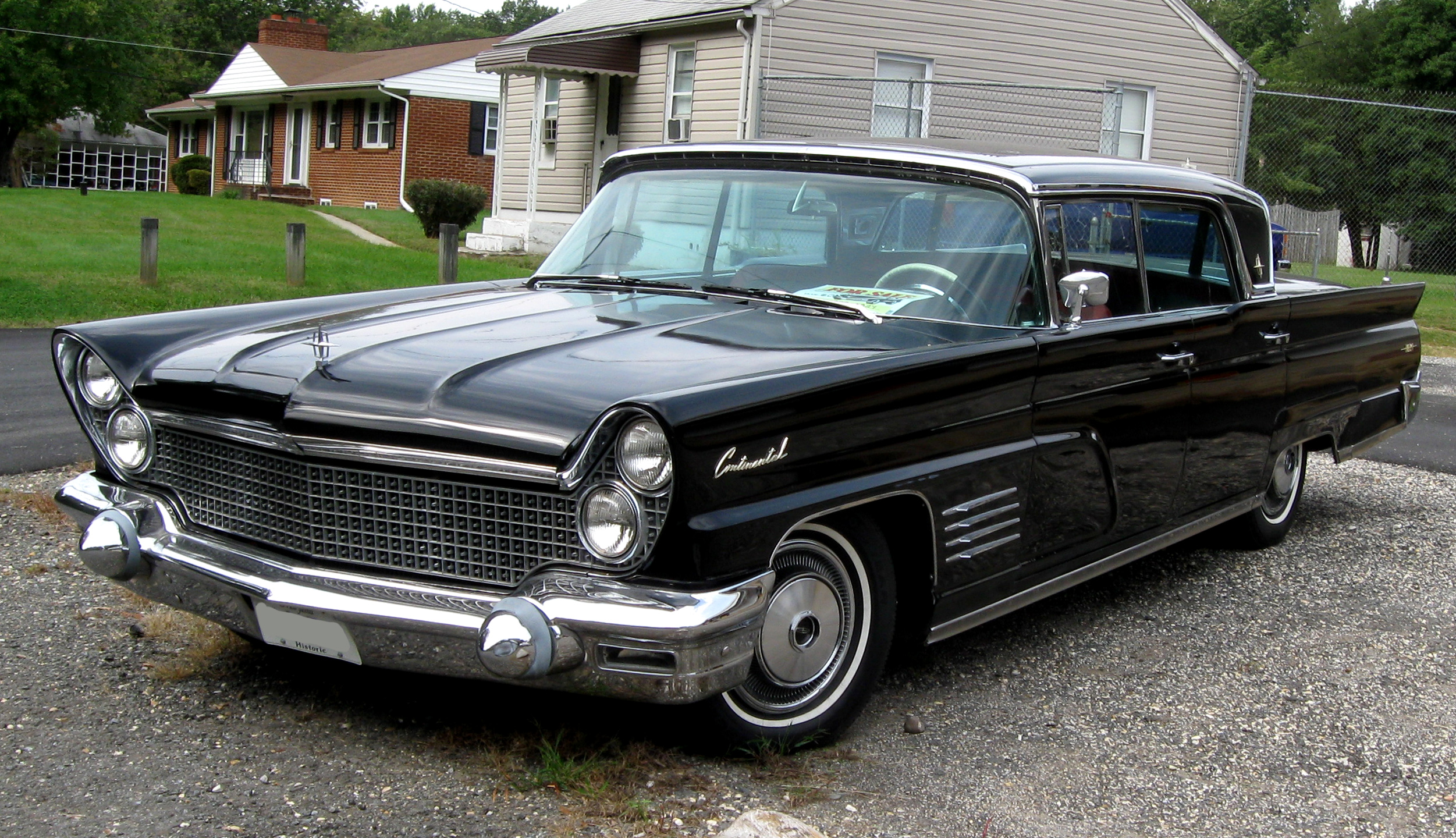
1960 Continental Mark V

Following the integration of Continental within Lincoln-Mercury in July 1956, Ford sought for ways to bring its flagship brand to profitability. After the 1957 model year, the hand-assembled Mark II was discontinued and replaced for 1958 with the Mark III branded as a Continental which was positioned above the Lincoln brand with higher trim sharing all new bodies that were built at the new Wixom Assembly Plant.

As part of an ultimatum to continue the brand, Continental underwent a US$4,000 (40%) price reduction ($44,637 in 2025 dollars), giving the all-new Continental Mark III a market position against the highest-trim Cadillacs and Imperials. To facilitate the price reduction, the Mark III was assembled in the same factory as the Ford Thunderbird, Lincoln Capri and Lincoln Premiere. Distinguished by its reverse-slant, retractable "Breezeway" rear window on all models – including convertibles, the Mark III was both one of the first Ford Motor Company vehicles to feature unitary body construction (along with the contemporaneous 1958–1960 Thunderbirds), but also one of Ford's largest unibody vehicles in history. In other firsts, FM radio joined AM radio as an option; "Auto Lube" automatically lubricated the entire car (through an oil reservoir kept full by the owner). The 1958–1960 Mark III–V has the distinction of being the only Continental Mark series vehicles offered as a convertible. The listed retail price of the convertible was US$6,283 ($70,113 in 2025 dollars) and 3,048 were built.

The 1959 Mark IV introduced two formal sedans, the Continental Town Car and Limousine. The Town Car/Limousine replaced the reverse-slant window with a forward-sloping rear window (moving the rear seat several inches rearward); the Limousine has a rear-seat partition. Other options include dual air conditioning units and a padded vinyl top; both versions were offered only in black. 214 Town Cars were sold and 83 Limousines were sold, making them the rarest Mark series variants.

The 1960 Mark V was restyled slightly, receiving a larger grille and new "dagmar bumpers".

=== Superlatives ===
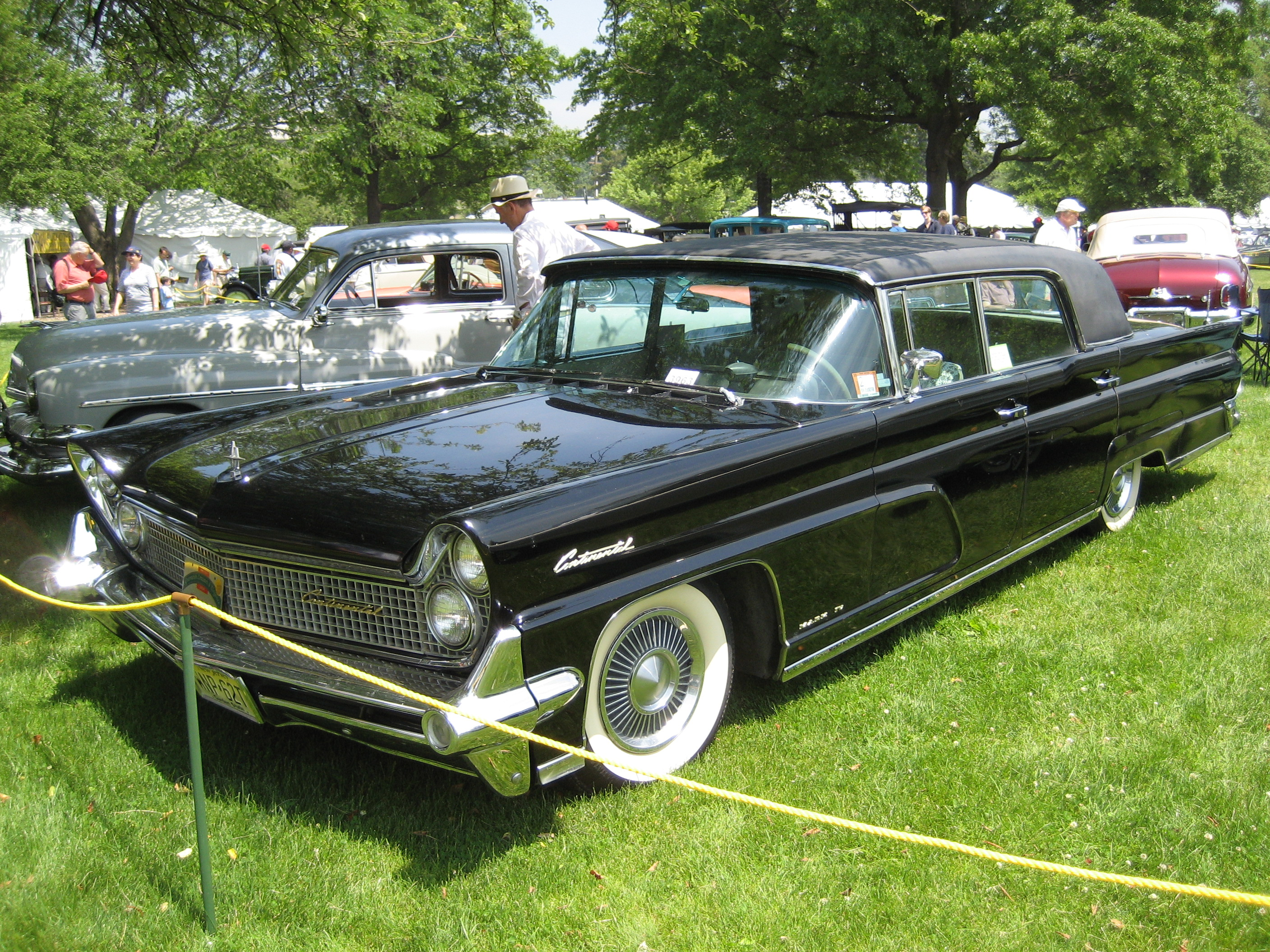
1959 Continental Mark IV Town Car (formal sedan)

In terms of standard production sedans without an extended wheelbase, the 1958–1960 Continentals and Lincolns are some of the largest automobiles ever made. The Continental Mark III, IV and V are the longest cars produced by the Ford Motor Company without federally mandated 5-mph bumpers. The 1959 Mark IV and 1960 Mark V Limousines and Town Cars are the heaviest American standard-wheelbase sedans built since World War II. 1960 is the only model year that a Mark series vehicle is mentioned as a Lincoln Continental in brochures and advertising.

While designers of the model line are related to a number of contemporary significant styling achievements, the launch of the 1969 Continental Mark III (and its relaunch of the Mark series nomenclature) has led to the term "forgotten Marks" in relation to the 1958–1960 generation. (Note: George W. Walker, known for his contribution to the development of the original Ford Thunderbird, was Vice-President in charge of Styling at Ford during this time. Elwood Engel, famous for being lead designer of generation four of the Lincoln Continental and for his work as chief designer at Chrysler in the 1960s, was Staff Stylist (and consequently roamed all of the design studios) at Ford during this period, and worked very closely with John Najjar in developing not only the 1958, but also the 1959 update. After John Najjar was relieved of his responsibilities as Chief Stylist of Lincoln in 1957 he became Engel's executive assistant, and the two worked closely together in the "stiletto studio" in developing the fourth generation Lincoln Continental, which won an award for its superlative styling. After Engel left Ford in 1961, Najjar became the lead designer of the Ford Mustang I concept car, which later gave birth to the Ford Mustang. Don Delarossa, who succeeded Najjar as Chief Stylist of Lincoln, was responsible for the 1960 update, and went on to become chief designer at Chrysler in the 1980s. Alex Tremulis, who was Chief Stylist at Auburn-Cord-Duesenberg in the mid- to late 1930s and known for his work on the 1948 Tucker Sedan, was head of Ford's Advanced Styling Studio during this period. It was his Ford La Tosca concept car, with its oval overlaid with an "X" theme, that gave the "slant eyed monster" nickname to the 1958 Mark III front end. Perhaps most ironically of all, L. David Ash was Lincoln's Executive Exterior Stylist when Najjar was in charge of Lincoln styling, the same L. David Ash who would later play such a prominent role as Chief Stylist of Ford in designing the 1969–1971 Continental Mark III, which helped cause Marks of this vintage (together with a marketing decision by then Ford Executive Vice-President Lee Iacocca) to be called the "forgotten Marks".)

== Second generation (Mark III; 1969–1971) ==
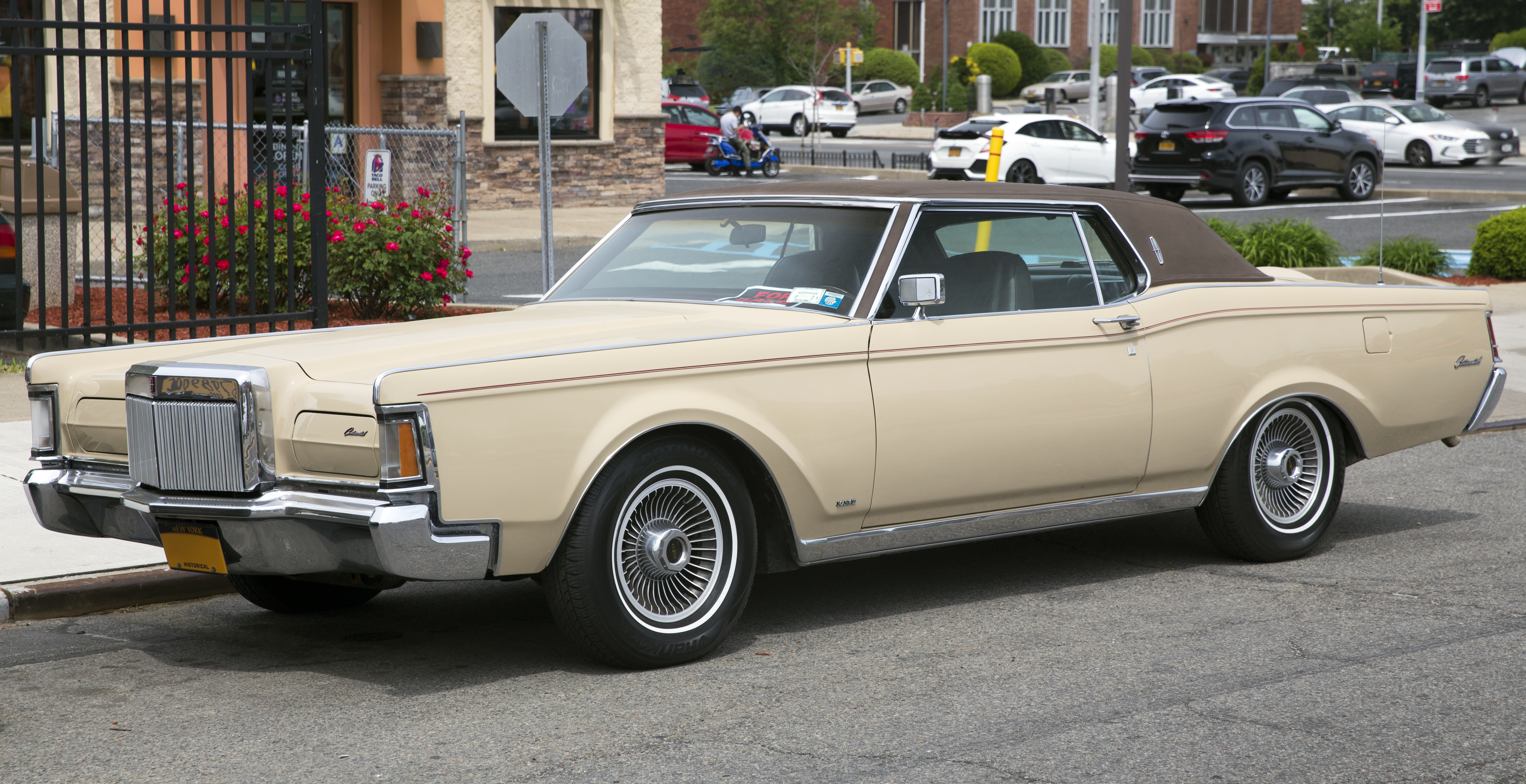
1971 Continental Mark III

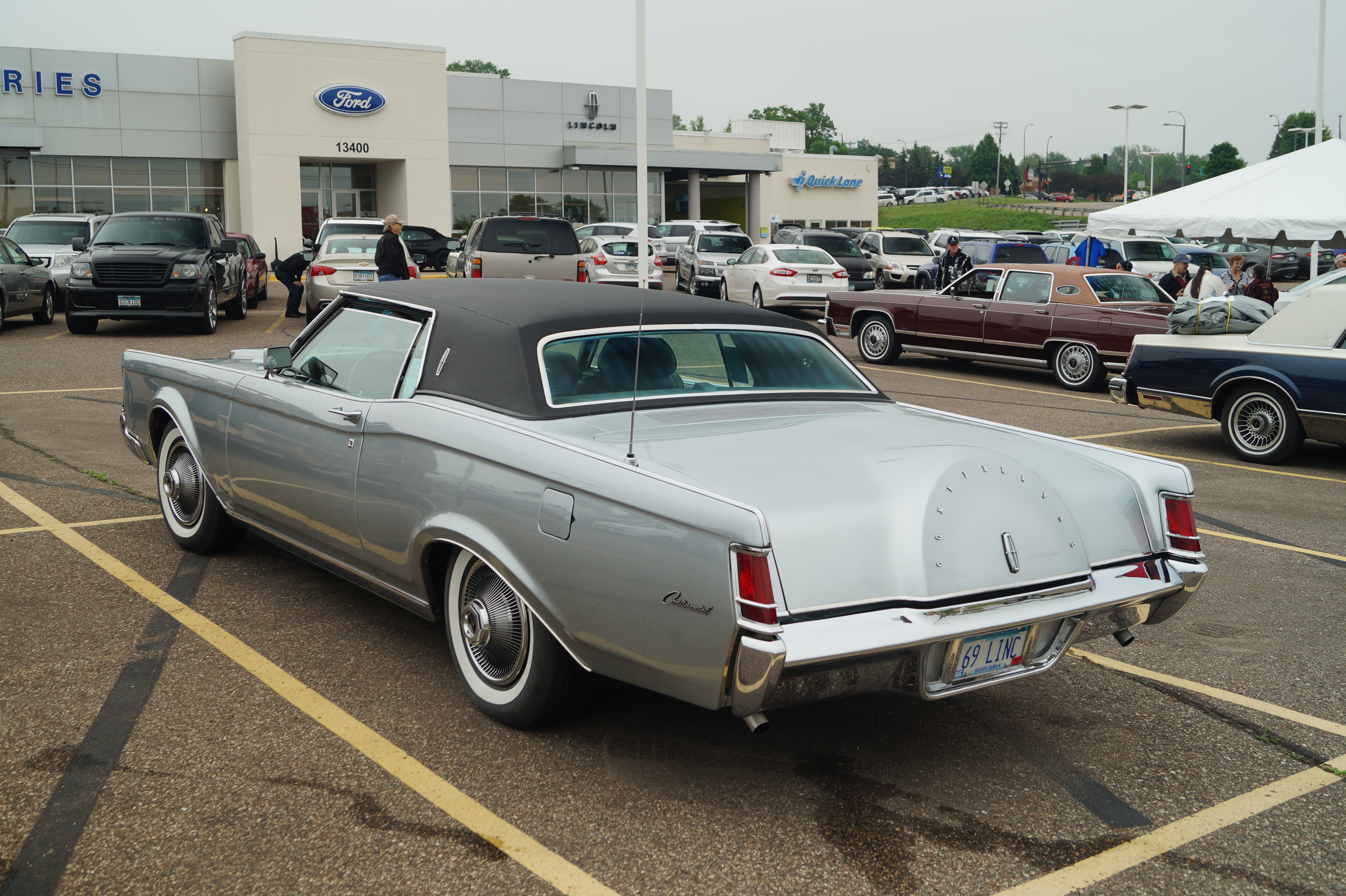
1969 Continental Mark III, rear

Released in April 1968 as an early 1969 model, the Continental Mark III was developed by Ford as its first flagship personal luxury vehicle since the discontinuation of the Mark II. Intended as a direct competitor for the Cadillac Eldorado, the introduction of the Mark III launched a brand rivalry that would last for the next three decades. Though not the original planned name for the vehicle, the revived Mark III nomenclature not only aligned the vehicle as successor to the Mark II, but downplayed the existence of the Lincoln-based Mark III, IV, and V of 1958–1960.

As before, the Mark III used the Continental brand name, but was sold and serviced through the Lincoln-Mercury dealership network. Sharing its chassis with the four-door Ford Thunderbird, all Mark IIIs were two-door hardtop coupes. Though no longer functionally necessary (the spare tire was mounted flat in the trunk floor), the "spare-tire" decklid returned as a styling feature. In a preview of design features that would be added to the Lincoln Continental during the 1970s, the Mark III featured a radiator-style grille and hidden headlamps; vent windows were deleted. In another change, the Mark III debuted the version of the four-point star that Lincoln currently uses today. The Ford 460 cubic-inch V8 debuted in the Mark III; during the 1970s, the engine would see use in Ford and Lincoln-Mercury full-size and intermediate cars (and would see use in Ford light trucks into the late 1990s).

One of the most technologically advanced vehicles of its time, the Mark III was fitted with power windows, locks, and seats, and optional automatic climate control (standard in 1971). Alongside becoming the first American-brand vehicle sold with radial tires as standard equipment (in 1970), the Mark III was offered with "Sure-Track", a primitive form of anti-lock braking (ABS) as an option for 1969, becoming standard in 1970.

== Third generation (Mark IV; 1972–1976) ==
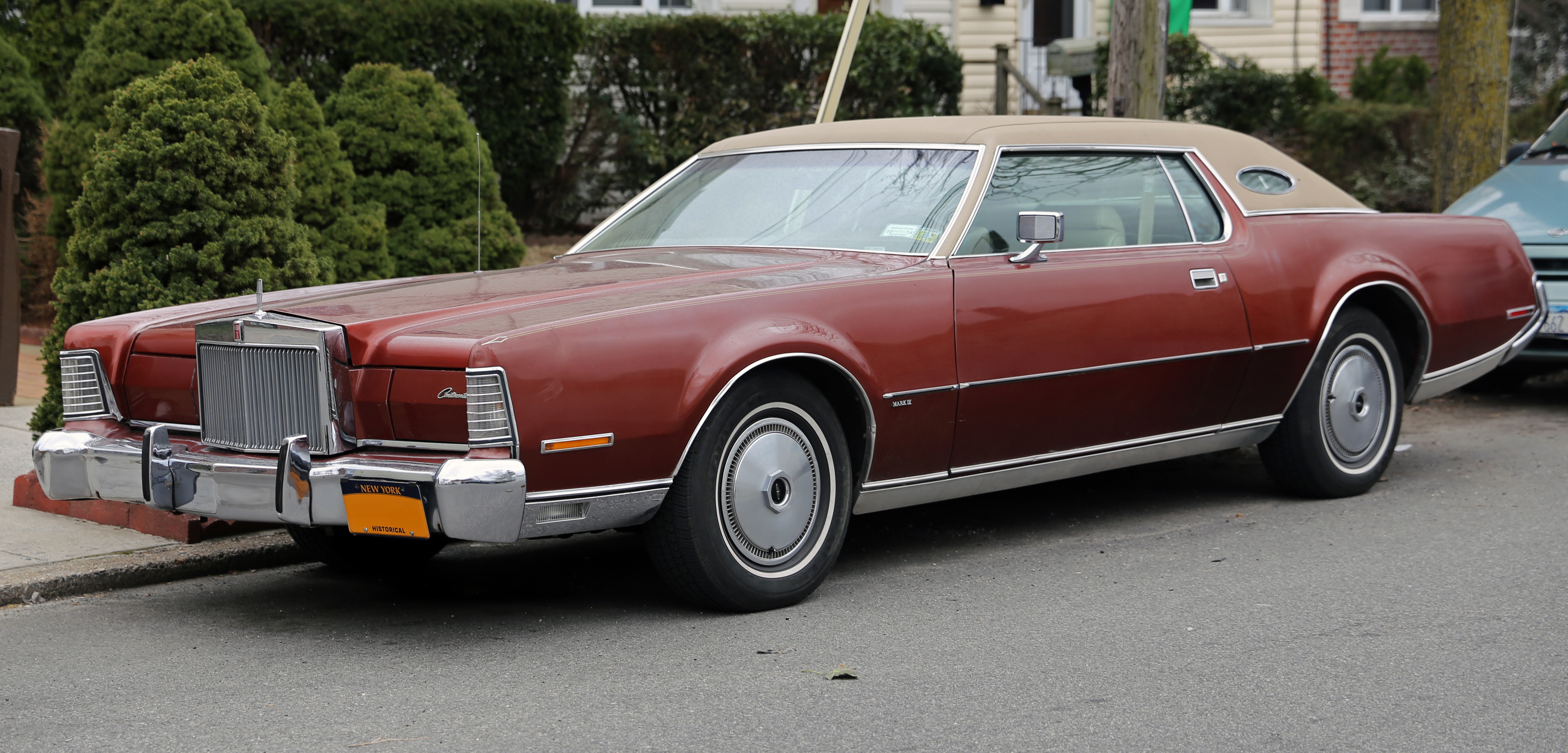
1973 Continental Mark IV

For 1972, the Continental Mark III was replaced by the all-new Continental Mark IV. In response to the success of the Mark III, the model line was again developed alongside the Ford Thunderbird, with the two coupes sharing a common roofline and inner body stampings (the Mark IV was styled with its own bodywork below the windows).

The Mark IV adopted multiple design features from its predecessor, including hidden headlamps, spare-tire trunklid, and a radiator-style grille (initially extending into the front bumper). To modernize the appearance of the model line, widely flared wheel openings were the same height for both axles (precluding skirted rear wheels). To further distinguish the Mark IV from the Thunderbird, an oval opera window was introduced as a C-pillar design feature; offered as an option for 1972, the design became standard for 1973.

For 1973, the Mark IV received a facelift of its front fascia, adopting larger 5-mph front bumpers and a smaller front grille (placed above the bumper). For 1974, the rear bumper was redesigned in a similar fashion, with the taillamps relocated from inside the bumper to above it. Added in compliance with federal regulations, the updates added 8 inches of length and nearly 400 pounds of weight to the body, with the Mark IV outgrowing the Cadillac Eldorado in size.

=== Special editions ===
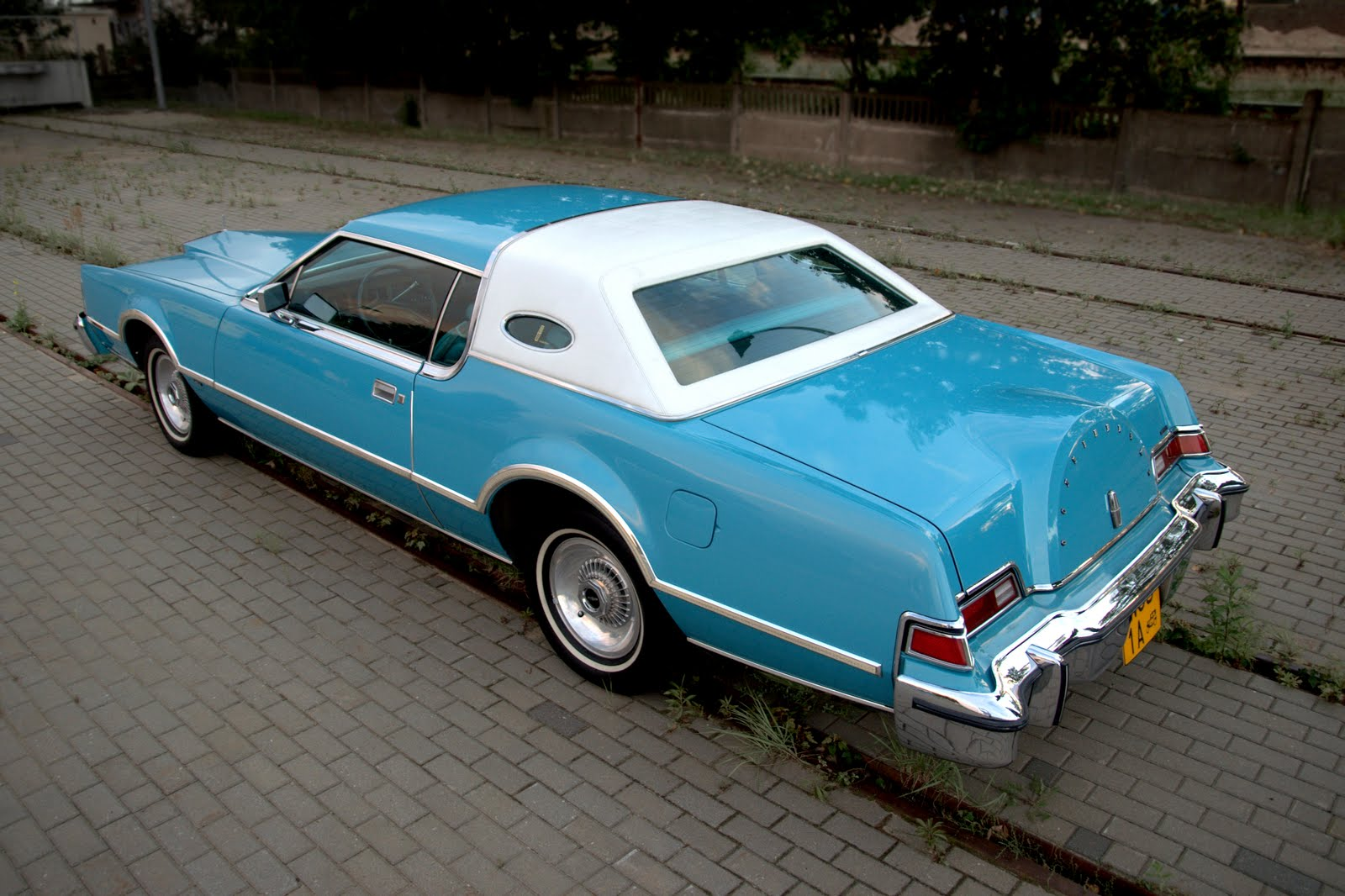
1976 Continental Mark IV, Givenchy Edition (rear)

In line with its status of a personal luxury car, the Mark IV offered a greater degree of customization over its Mark III predecessor. The Luxury Group option (introduced in 1973) was a higher-trim version of the Mark IV, offering color-coordinated exterior, vinyl roof, and interior; the color offerings were revised yearly.

In what would become a long-running tradition for the Mark Series (and later Lincoln), the Designer Edition series was introduced in 1976. Similar to the Luxury Group, the Designer Edition series was a collaboration between Ford and fashion designers to create specially coordinated exterior and interior combinations. Named after Cartier, Bill Blass, Givenchy, and Emilio Pucci, each version of the Designer Edition received the name of the selected designer on the opera window (alongside badging near the glovebox).

== Fourth generation (Mark V; 1977–1979) ==
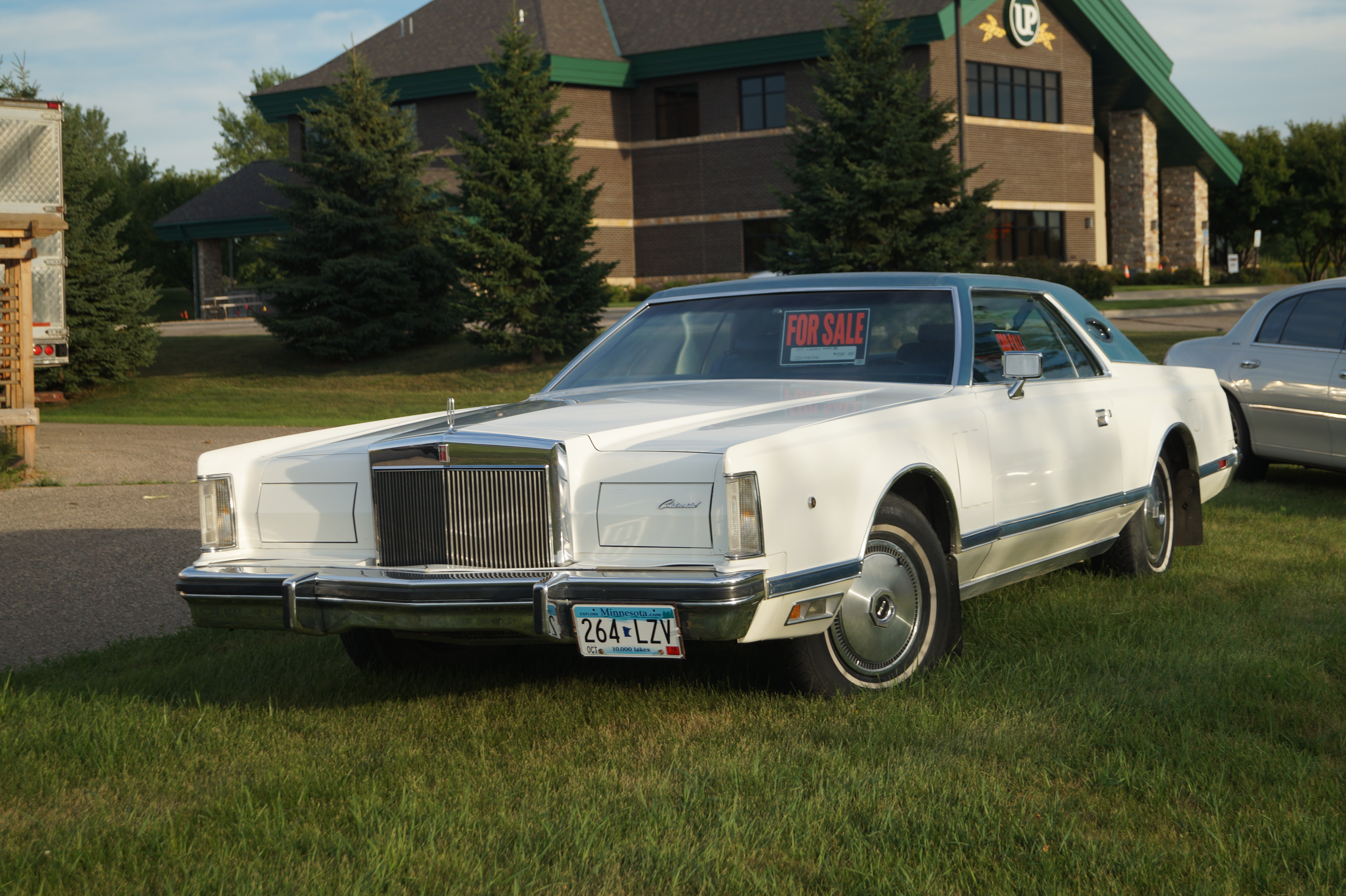
1977 Continental Mark V

For 1977, Ford released the Continental Mark V as the next-generation Mark Series coupe. While the Ford Thunderbird was shifted to the Ford Torino intermediate chassis, the Mark V was a substantial redesign of the previous-generation Mark IV. At 230 inches long, the personal luxury coupe was only 3 inches shorter than the standard Lincoln Continental; however, careful engineering reduced curb weight of the vehicle by over 400 pounds. With no Thunderbird stablemate, the Mark V was the first generation of the Mark Series since the Mark II produced with no divisional counterpart.

Though sharing chassis underpinnings with its predecessor (including a common 120.4-inch wheelbase), the Mark V shared no exterior body panels with the Mark IV. Many design elements made a return in contemporary form, with the body styled with sharper edges for the fender and window lines; the Mark V introduced vertically oriented taillamps and front fender vents. While technically a delete option, a vinyl top was specified on nearly all vehicles; for 1979, it became standard.

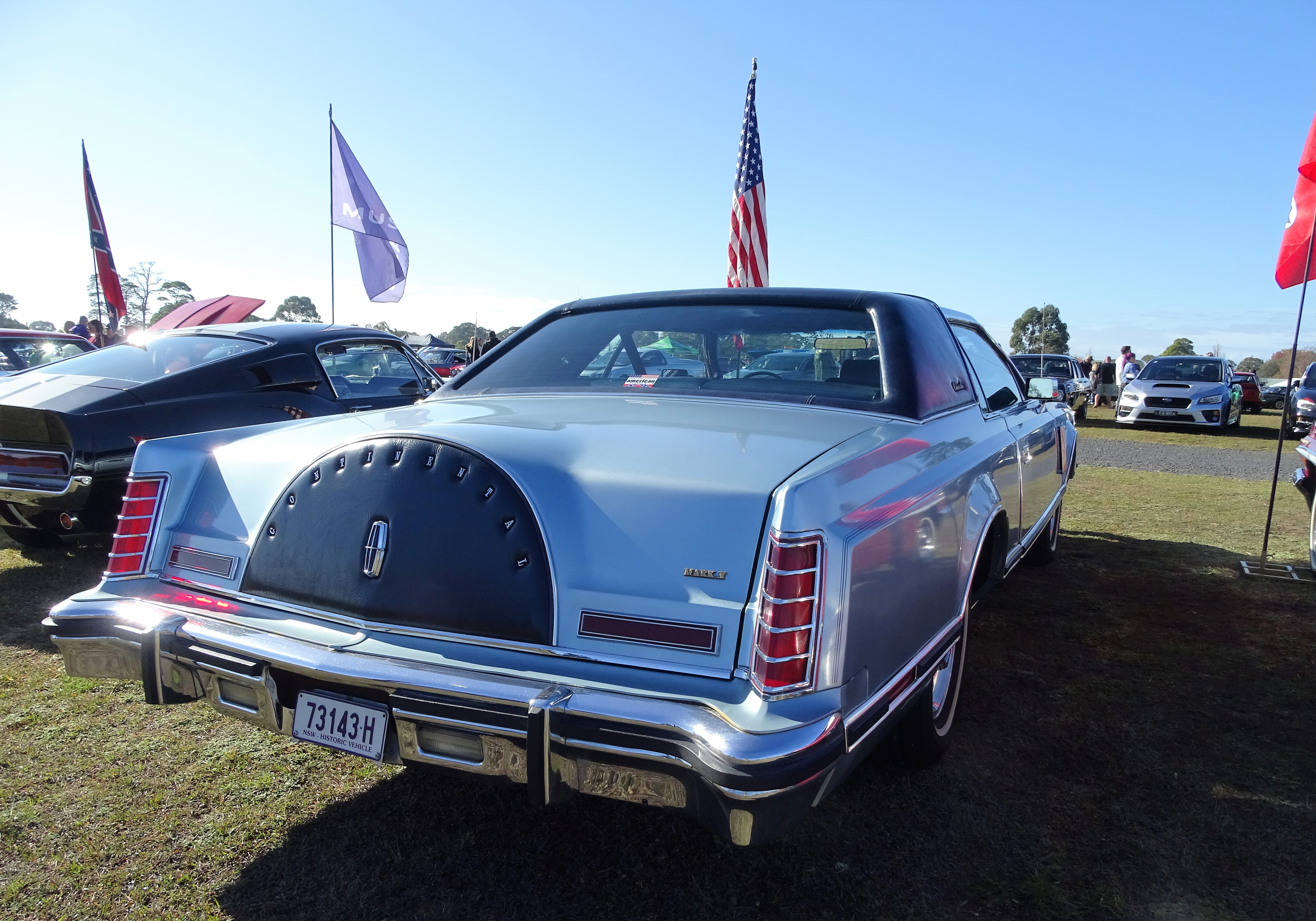
Lincoln Continental Mark V

To improve the fuel economy of the model line, a 400 cubic-inch V8 now became the standard engine, with the 460 V8 remaining an option (outside of California); for 1979, the 400 V8 became the sole engine offering. As an industry first, Ford introduced an optional LED "miles-to-empty" gauge for 1978; a precursor to later trip computers, the gauge calculated estimated fuel range (based on the fuel tank level).

=== Special editions ===
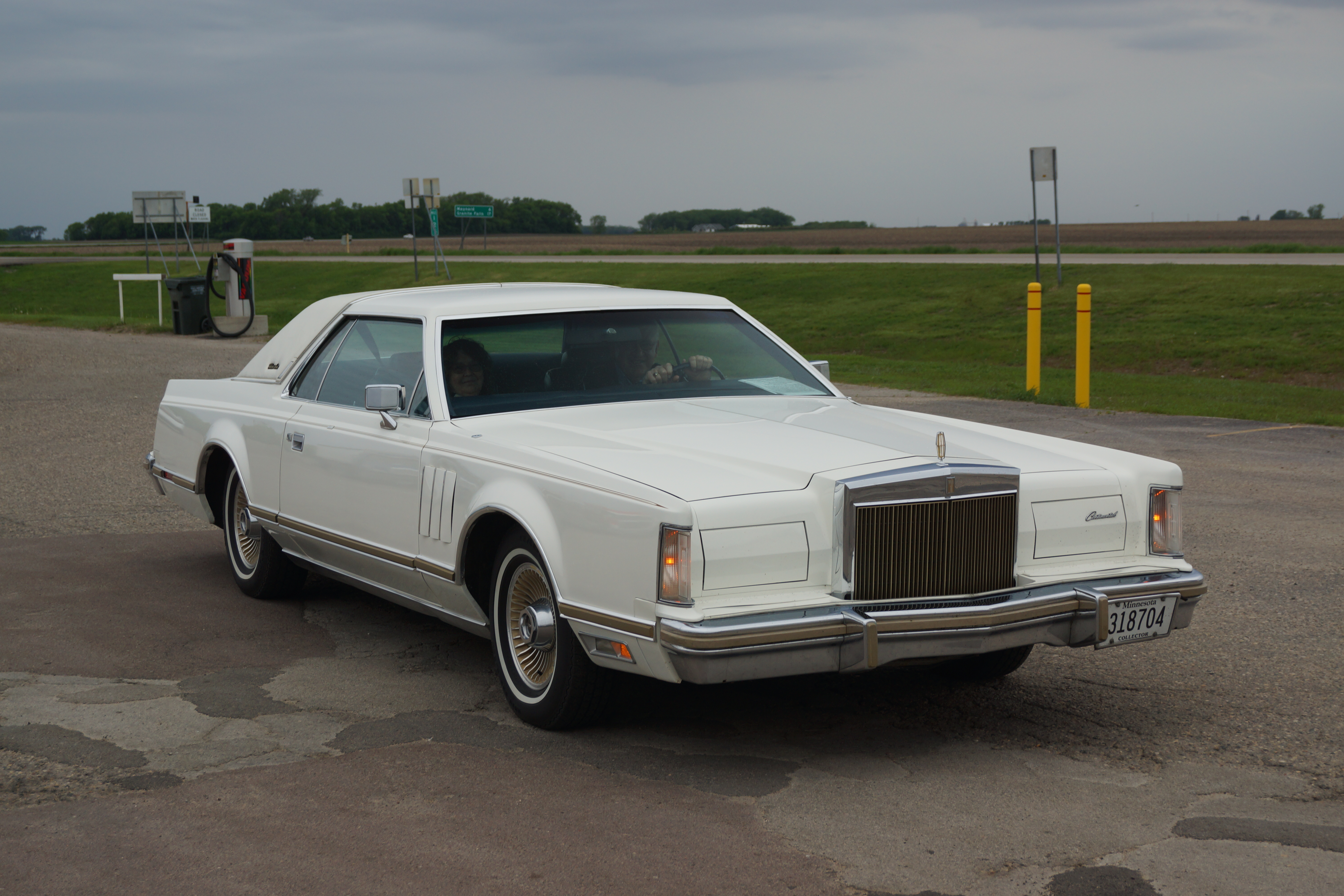
1979 Continental Mark V Collector's Edition

Though the Mark V is the shortest-produced generation, 1977, 1978, and 1979 are also the highest-selling model years for the entire Mark series. From the Mark IV, the Luxury Group and all four Designer Editions made their return, changing their color combinations yearly.

To commemorate the 75th anniversary of Ford Motor Company, a Diamond Jubilee Edition of the Mark V was offered for 1978. A nearly $8000 option, the Diamond Jubilee Edition option package included a nearly monochromatic exterior in two option-exclusive color choices (Diamond Blue or Jubilee Gold) along with a crystal hood ornament. The interior received a center console and front bucket seats. Including nearly every available feature, the only stand-alone options were a 460 V8, moonroof, or a CB radio.

To commemorate the end of Continental Mark V production, a Collectors Edition was offered for 1979. Again offered for $8000, the option package offered a monochromatic exterior appearance with option-exclusive colors (further distinguished by the deletion of the opera windows). Offering largely every feature as standard, a delete option replaced the 8-track stereo with a cassette player.

== Fifth generation (Mark VI; 1980–1983) ==
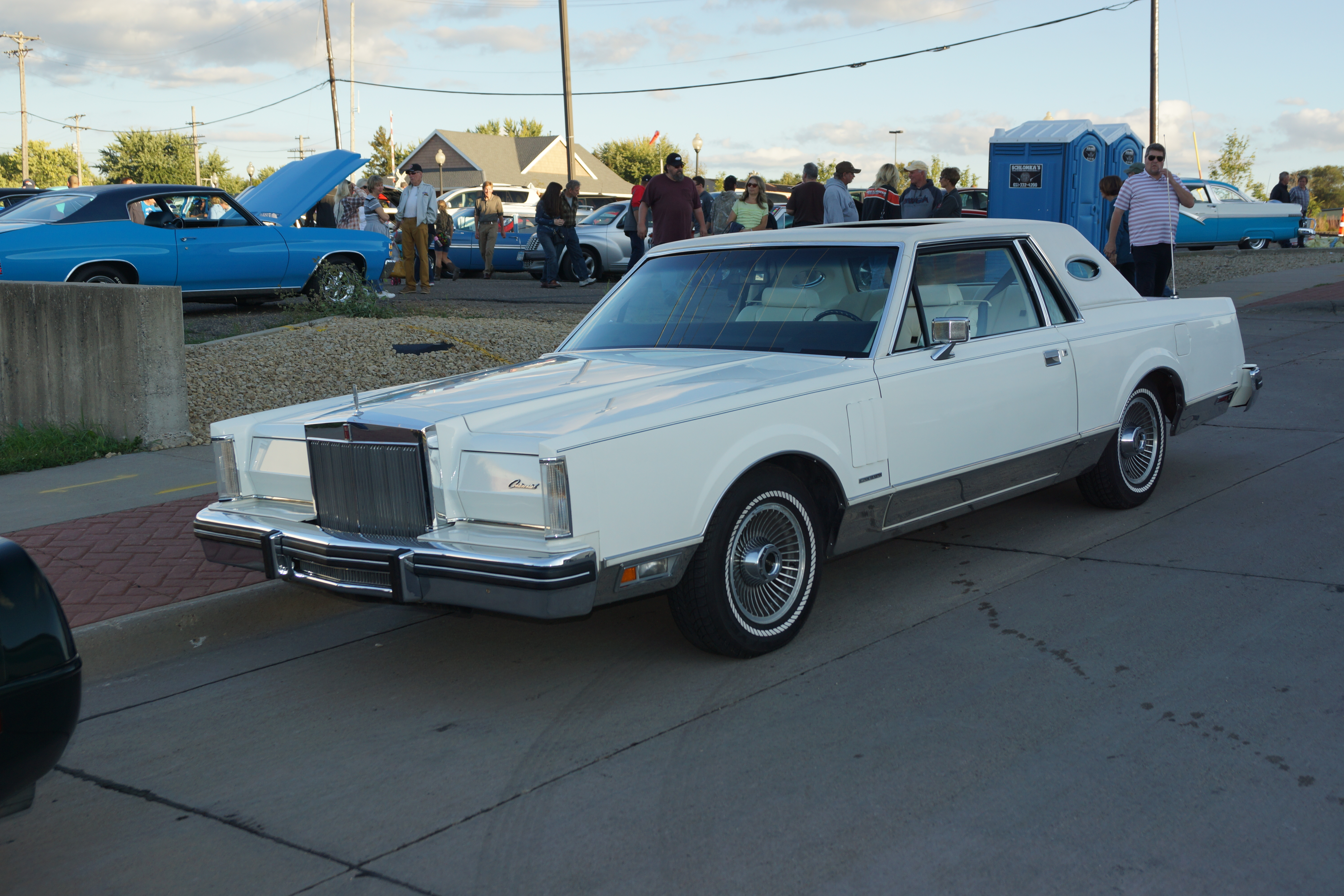
1981 Continental Mark VI two-door

For 1980, Ford released the downsized Continental Mark VI, receiving its first complete redesign since 1972. The redesign began life as a mid-size line (derived from the Fox platform), moving to the full-size Panther chassis during its development. Originally intended to become a full range of body styles, the Mark VI replaced the Mark V as a two-door and four-door sedan, adopting a fixed B-pillar and fully framed door glass. Shorter and lighter than both the 1956 Mark II and the 1939 Lincoln Continental, the new model line shed 14 inches in length and 800 pounds from its Mark V predecessor.

While the four-door Mark VI sedan shared much of its body with the Lincoln Continental (Lincoln Town Car from 1981 onward), the two-door Mark VI received a greater degree of differentiation, adopting the shorter wheelbase of the Ford LTD/Mercury Marquis and a distinct roofline (similar to the Mark V). Alongside the return of the spare-tire decklid and vertical taillamps, the Mark VI was also styled with several features deleted from the Town Car, including oval opera windows and hidden headlamps; (non-functional) louvers were added to the front fenders.

Coinciding with the extensive reduction in exterior footprint, the Mark VI replaced the 6.6L and 7.5L V8s with a 4.9L V8. Sharing the same-displacement engine as the Lincoln Versailles, the version used by the Mark VI was the first V8 engine to use electronically controlled fuel injection. Paired with a 4-speed overdrive automatic transmission, the 4.9L Mark VI achieved a fuel economy increase of nearly 40% compared to its 1979 6.6L predecessor. The engine-transmission combination was offered for all Ford Panther-chassis vehicles for 1981.

In addition to its powertrain upgrades, the Mark VI introduced a fully digital (VFD) instrument panel. The Mark VI replaced the LED "miles to empty" display with a multi-function digital trip computer. On the driver's door, a pushbutton keyless entry system was introduced; in place of a key fob, a set of door mounted pushbuttons unlocked the doors (and/or trunk) when a driver-programmed code was entered. Alongside handheld keyless systems, variations of the door-mounted system remain an optional.

=== Trim ===
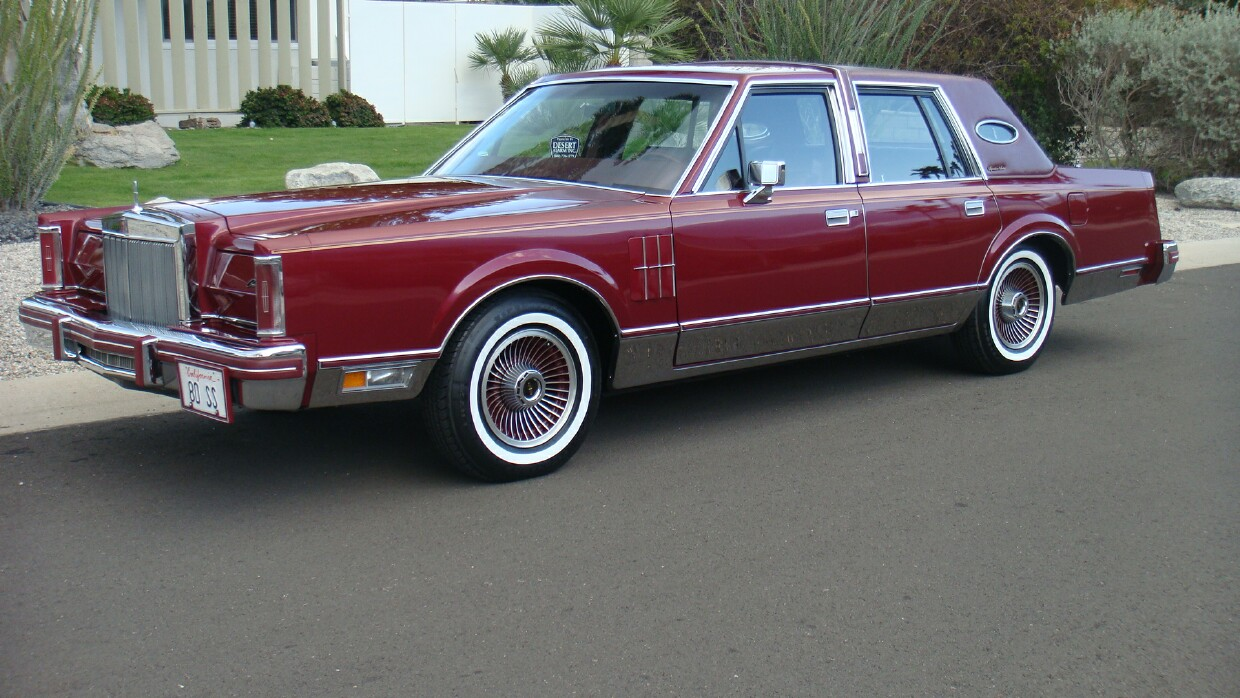
1980 Continental Mark VI Signature Series four-door

For 1980, the Signature Series was introduced as the highest-level trim for the Mark VI. Similar in content to the previous Collector's Edition, the Signature Series combined nearly every feature in a single option package. Initially offered in option-specific exterior and interior colors, the Signature Series was offered in any color from 1982 onward. For 1981, a less-exclusive Town Car Signature Series was offered, with versions of the trim line offered through its entire production.

As with the Mark IV and Mark V, the Mark VI continued to offer yearly-updated Designer Editions (Cartier, Bill Blass, Pucci, Givenchy). During the production of the Mark VI, several versions became adopted by Lincoln; the Cartier Edition was moved to the Town Car (1982) with the Givenchy Edition moving to the Continental (1983).

== Sixth generation (Mark VII; 1984–1992) ==
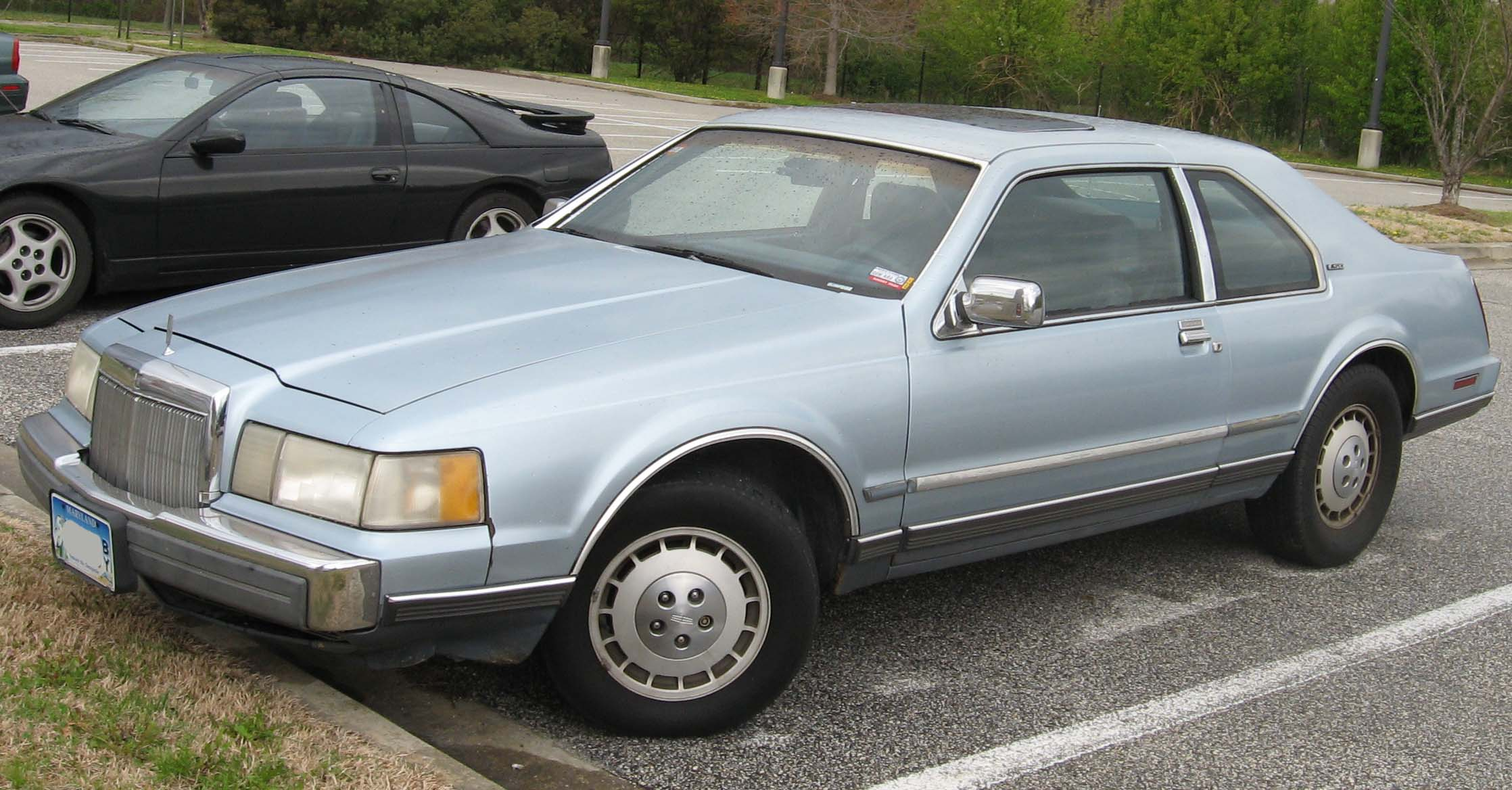
1984–1985 Continental Mark VII LSC

For 1984, the Mark VII was introduced downsized a second time adopting the mid-size Ford Fox platform to match the size of its Cadillac Eldorado rival. In a nearly complete break from its predecessors, the Mark VII was developed with far better road manners than its Mark VI predecessor; though not a grand tourer, the driving experience was prioritized as part of a personal luxury car for the 1980s. Sharing its underpinnings with the Ford Thunderbird and Mercury Cougar XR7, the Mark VII was a two-door counterpart of the 1982–1987 Lincoln Continental (sold only as a four-door sedan).

Alongside its role of Ford Motor Company flagship vehicle and two-door counterpart to the Lincoln Continental, the Mark VII took on a new role, serving as the technology flagship for Ford, introducing multiple firsts for the company (and the industry as a whole). Far more aerodynamic than its predecessor, the model line was the first American automobile to offer replaceable-bulb "composite" headlamps (allowing headlamps to be faired into bodywork); the feature was introduced following multiple government campaigns by Ford to legalize their use in North America. In line with the 1983 Thunderbird and Cougar, the Mark VII faired the bumpers into the bodywork and the window glass was made nearly flush (retiring the opera windows). While the spare-tire decklid remained, its design was faired into the decklid significantly to reduce drag. The first vehicle sold in North America with electronic 4-channel antilock brakes, the Mark VII also was equipped with 4-wheel disc brakes and 4-wheel air suspension.

Coinciding with its size reduction and repackaging as a personal luxury coupe, the Mark VII became the first Mark Series offered as a 5-passenger car, all versions were offered with front bucket seats. As an option, a self-dimming rear-view mirror was added, along with a self-latching trunklid. 1985 marked the final year of the CB radio and 8-track player and the introduction of the in-car telephone (introduced as a $2,995 option).

Sharing its wheelbase with the Lincoln Continental and the 1980–1982 Ford Thunderbird and Mercury Cougar XR-7, the Mark VII shared its 4.9L V8 with the Ford Mustang; for 1984 and 1985, a BMW-sourced 2.4L turbodiesel inline-6 was offered as an option.

The longest-produced generation of the Mark Series (longer than the Mark IV and Mark V combined), the Mark VII underwent few fundamental changes through its nine-year production run. For 1986, Ford retired the Continental brand entirely, with the Continental Mark VII renamed the Lincoln Mark VII. For 1989, the Mark VII was fitted with the 4.9L HO engine of the Mustang GT. For 1990, the interior received a revision (with the dashboard redesigned to accommodate a driver-side airbag).

=== Trim ===
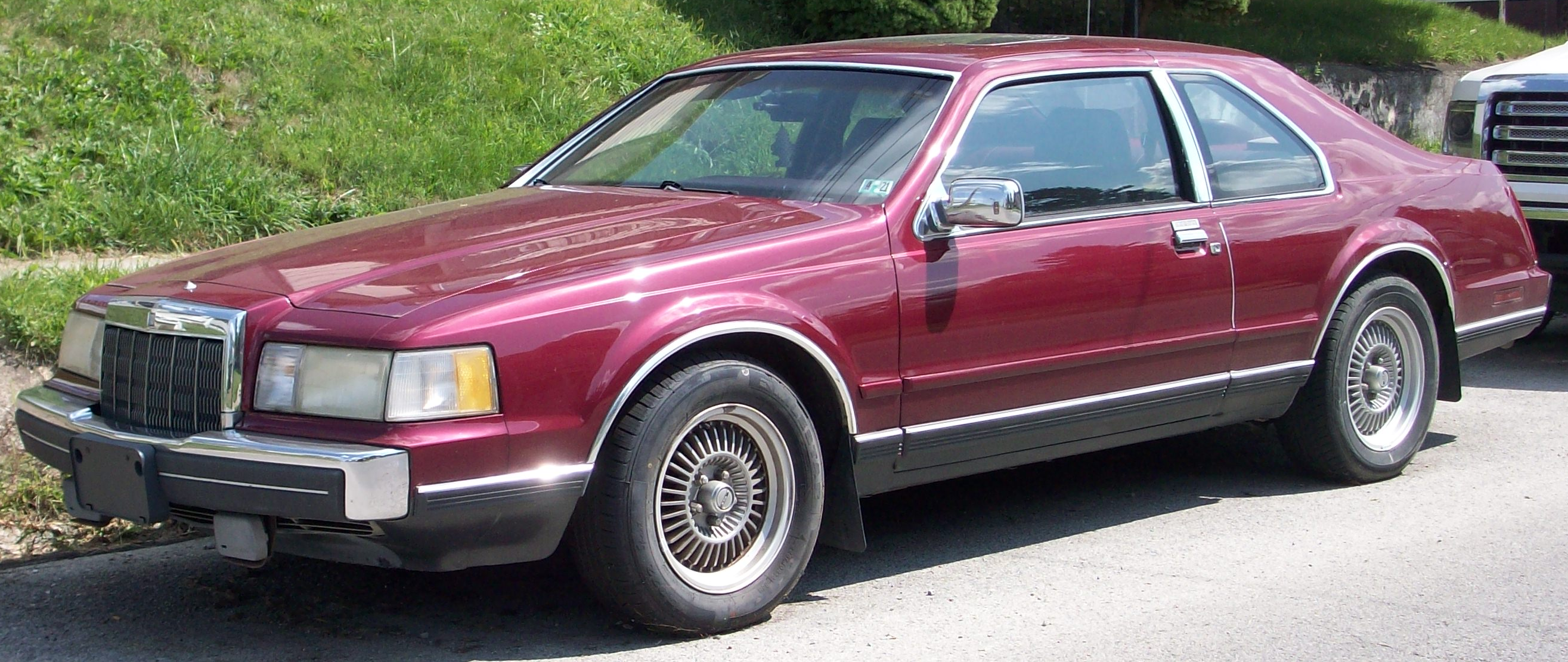
1988–1989 Lincoln Mark VII LSC

For its launch, the Mark VII was marketed in an unnamed standard trim, Designer Series, and the LSC. The Designer Series returned the Bill Blass Edition, with a Gianni Versace Edition replacing the Pucci Edition. While far more subdued in appearance than their predecessors, Mark VII Designer Series still maintained the use of color-coordinated exteriors and interiors. For 1986, the Versace Edition was discontinued, with the Bill Blass Edition becoming the sole remaining Designer Series offered for the Mark Series. From 1988, the edition became the standard Mark VII trim.

Introduced for 1984, the LSC (Luxury Sports Coupe) trim was an option package that effectively upgraded the Mark VII to a luxury grand touring car. Along with sharing its powertrain with the Ford Mustang GT (though with an automatic transmission), the LSC received firmer suspension tuning and sportier seats; the interior trim was model-specific (deleting wood trim altogether), receiving full analog instrumentation for 1986 (replacing the digital dashboard). Initially fitted with its own badging and trim, the LSC adopted 16-inch wheels for 1990; a Special Edition monochromatic exterior was optional (deleting nearly all chrome trim).

== Seventh generation (Mark VIII; 1993–1998) ==
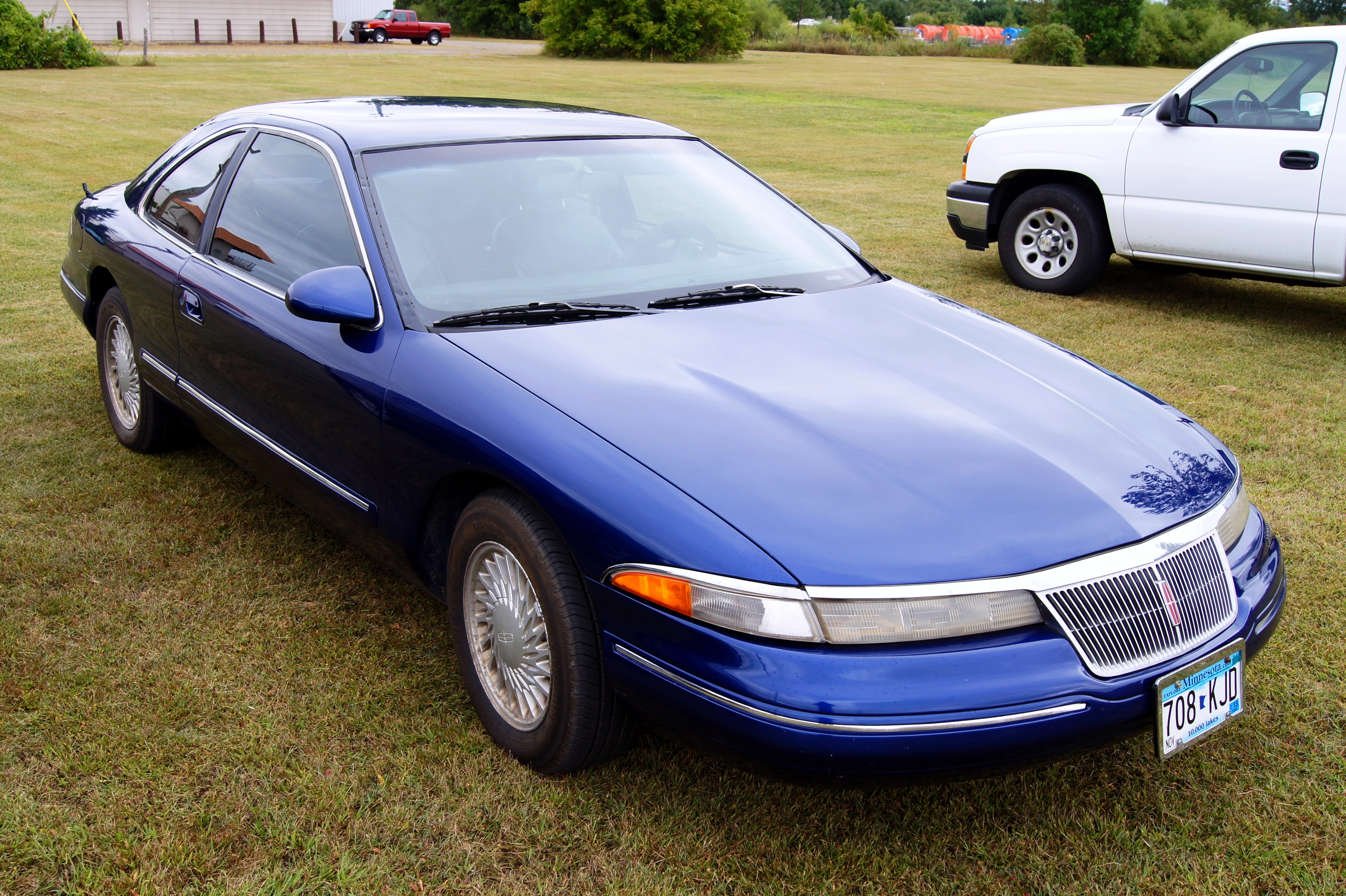
1993 Lincoln Mark VIII

For 1993, the Lincoln Mark VIII was released as the first generation of the Mark series entirely under the Lincoln brand. Serving as a successor to the Mark VII LSC, the slightly larger Mark VIII was a luxury-oriented grand touring coupe. While maintaining its rivalry against the Cadillac Eldorado, the Mark VIII was also developed as competition for coupes from European and Japanese automakers, including the Acura Legend and Lexus SC. In a return to Mark Series tradition, the model line was again a counterpart of the Thunderbird, using the all-new FN10 platform (a Lincoln-exclusive variant of the MN12 platform).

Far more futuristic in appearance than both its predecessor and the Thunderbird/Cougar, the Mark VIII was styled with an exterior nearly devoid of chrome trim; in line with the original Mark II, chrome was limited to the grille, window surrounds, and headlamp/taillamp trim. The long-running spare-tire decklid made its return (reduced to vestigial status). The interior of the Mark VIII was highly driver-oriented, with several 1990s Ford vehicles adopting elements of its design.

The 4.9L V8 was replaced by a 4.6L V8 (the first Ford Motor Company vehicle fitted with a dual-overhead cam V8). Alongside the Thunderbird and Cougar, the Mark VIII was the sole four-seat American car with both rear-wheel drive and independent rear suspension (at the time). In another first, the 1995 LSC became the first American car fitted with HID headlights; the 1997 Mark VIII was the first American car fitted with neon-bulb brake lamps.

For 1997, the exterior underwent a minor revision, receiving a larger grille and redesigned exterior lights. To reduce drag, the spare-tire decklid design was reduced further in size.

=== Trim ===
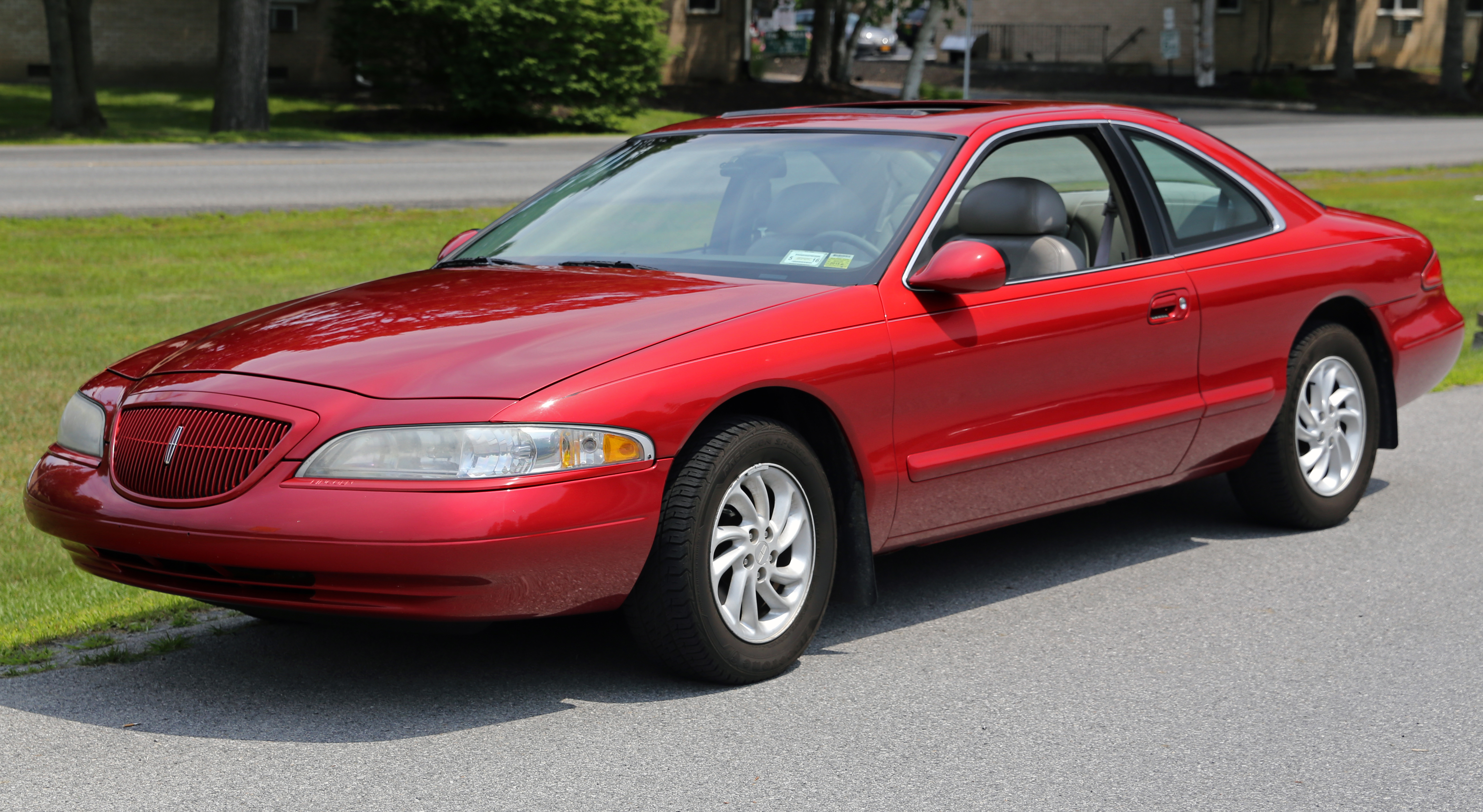
1998 Lincoln Mark VIII LSC

From 1993 to 1994, the Mark VIII was offered in a single trim level; along with shifting the Designer Series entirely to the Lincoln Town Car Cartier Edition, the LSC was placed on hiatus.

For 1995, the sport/touring-oriented LSC (Luxury Sports Coupe) trim made its return. In line with its predecessor, the Mark VIII LSC offered model badging, body-color trim and its own suspension tuning, along with a distinct rear axle ratio, and true dual exhaust (raising engine output by 10 hp).

For 1996, Lincoln offered a Diamond Anniversary Edition for the Mark VIII (commemorating its 75th year of production). Along with specific badging, the option included a voice-activated phone, leather seats, and upgraded audio system.

== Continental branding ==
The use of the Continental nameplate by Ford Motor Company has been a source of confusion since the 1950s (similar to the branding confusion between Imperial and Chrysler Imperial). The nameplate first saw use by Lincoln from 1939 to 1948 (skipping World War II). After the vehicle was retired, the nameplate went dormant until Ford created the Continental Division in 1955. Intended as the flagship marque of Ford Motor Company, Continental was slotted above Lincoln, with the Mark II personal luxury coupe serving as its inaugural product line. Given the full nomenclature, Continental Mark II denoted Continental as the make and Mark II as the model and version.

While the Mark II was produced for 1957, the Continental Division was discontinued in July 1956 and the Continental brand was integrated into the Mercury-Edsel-Lincoln Division (MEL), again slotted above Lincoln. Though sold and serviced in the same dealerships as Lincolns, Continentals were not badged as Lincolns, nor did any identification plates, VINs, and factory paperwork bear the Lincoln name. Following the discontinuation of Edsel, the division again became Lincoln-Mercury.

Following the retirement of the Mark II, the Continental brand returned to use for 1958 for a successor Continental Mark III. Though derived closely from the Lincoln line, the Mark III again did not use any Lincoln branding on an official basis, nor did the 1959 Continental Mark IV. As the series came more popular, the Lincoln name became colloquially attached (though incorrectly); for the 1960 Continental Mark V, Lincoln-Mercury referred to the model line as a Lincoln Continental in brochures and advertising (also in preparation for the nameplate to become the sole Lincoln model series for 1961). Though the Lincoln name never appeared on the 1958–1960 Mark III–Mark V, Continental was often not properly registered or recognized as the make of Mark Series vehicles by dealerships or state motor vehicle departments.

When Ford introduced the Mark III as the direct successor of the Continental Mark II for 1969, the model line also returned the Continental brand name to use. Resuming its previous position as a Ford Motor Company flagship, the model line was marketed above Lincoln within the Lincoln-Mercury dealership network. Sold in the same showroom as the Lincoln Continental, the Mark III and its successors shared advertising materials with the Lincoln model line.

Prior to 1981 production, there was no distinct indicator in vehicle identification numbers (VINs) for vehicle make or manufacturer. VINs only had indicators for the model year, assembly plant, body series (which represented only the vehicle model name and body style type), engine size and sequential production number. From 1981 onward, all vehicle manufacturers were required by the National Highway Traffic Safety Administration (NHTSA) to use a 17-character VIN-code with more detailed information. The first three digits is the World Manufacturer Identifier which indicates the country of origin and make of a vehicle. The 1981–1983 Continental Mark VI, 1984–1985 Continental Mark VII, and the 1982–1985 Lincoln Continental 4-door sedan (which was always badged as a Lincoln) have the separate VIN code 1MR which designates Continental as the make instead of 1LN as Lincoln (used by the Lincoln Town Car).

For the 1986 model year, Ford Motor Company clarified confusion over the branding of the Continental Mark series, renaming the Continental Mark VII as the Lincoln Mark VII. Along with the change in marketing, the revision was also made to the VIN of the model line, with both the Mark VII and Continental sedan assigned the 1LN manufacturer code of Lincoln. For the first time, the Lincoln nameplate appeared on a Mark series vehicle.

In contrast to its predecessors, the 1993–1998 Lincoln Mark VIII never used Continental as a marque or model name.

=== Continental star ===
Following the closure of the Continental Division and its integration into Lincoln-Mercury, Continental branded vehicles retained the use of the four-point "Continental Star" emblem of the Mark II while Lincoln models used an eight-point star through 1960. With the 1961 Lincoln Continental becoming the sole Lincoln model line, it continued only the use of the "Continental Star" emblem. The 1977 Lincoln Versailles was the first car to wear the "Continental Star" emblem that was not branded by make or model as Continental. From this point forward the "Continental Star" has been used as the Lincoln brand emblem for all model lines.

== Further use of name ==
=== MK9, MKR, and Mark X concept cars ===
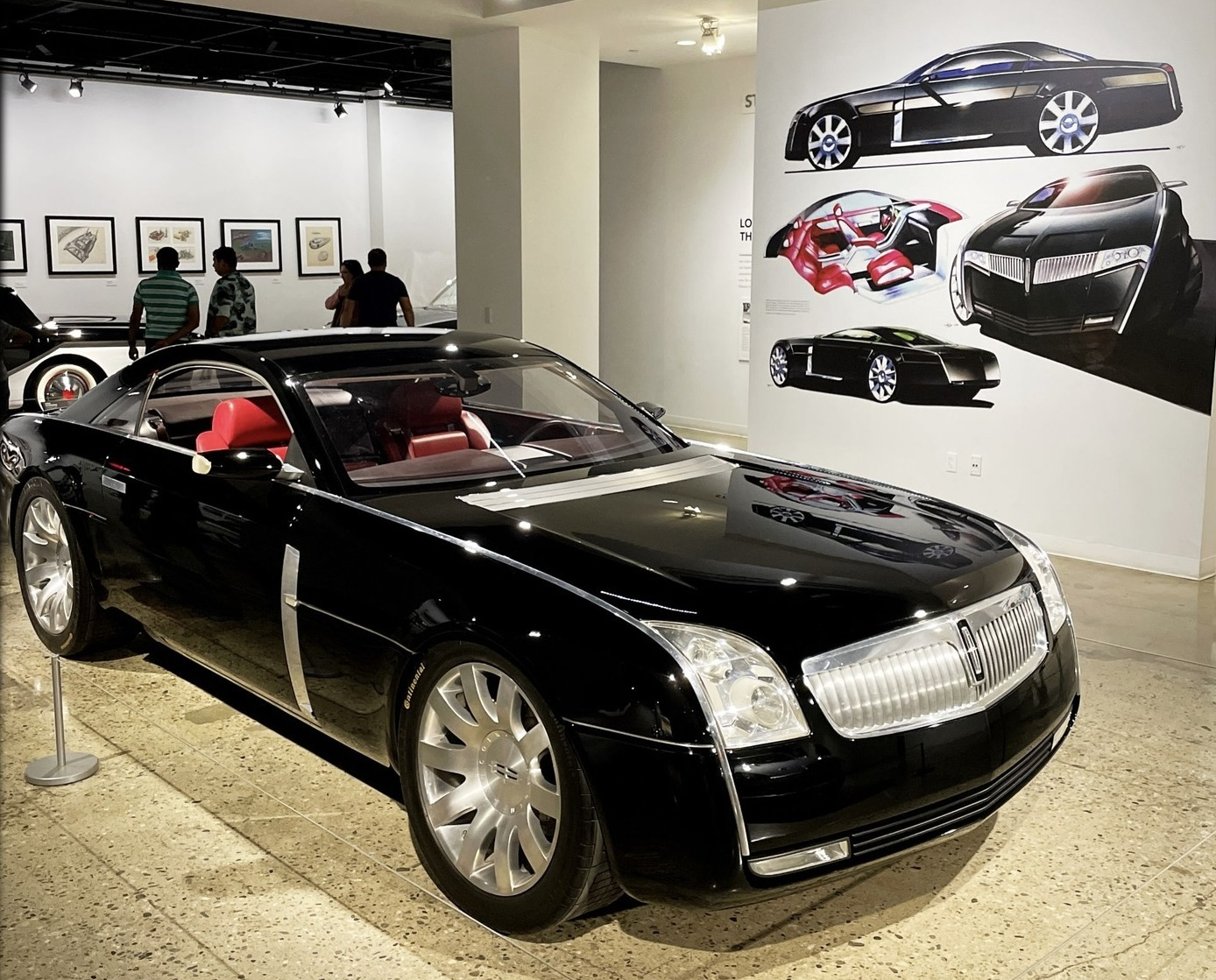
2001 Lincoln MK9 concept

In the early 2000s, Lincoln produced two personal-luxury concept cars using the Mark Series name. The two-door MK9 (pronounced "Mark Nine") debuted at the 2001 New York International Auto Show. Intended to explore the Mark Series past the discontinued Mark VIII, the MK9 was a two-door sedan with rear-wheel drive and a DOHC V8 engine The styling of the MK9 influenced several later concepts, including the 2002 Continental concept and the 2003 Navicross.

The use of letters to identify different models began during Ford's acquisition of British luxury marques Jaguar, Aston Martin, and to a lesser extent Swedish marque Volvo in the Premier Automotive Group. Letters were used to identify the Jaguar XJ, the Jaguar XK8, the Aston Martin DB7, and the Volvo S60 and Volvo XC70.

In 2004, the last car to use the Mark Series name debuted at the Detroit Auto Show. The Mark X ("Mark Ten") was a two-seat convertible; a first for the Mark Series. Mechanically based on the 2002–2005 Ford Thunderbird, the Mark X added a power-folding retractable hardtop. Although its Thunderbird origins were apparent above the window line, much of the Mark X was restyled for a contemporary and modern appearance (rather than the retro styling seen on its Ford stablemate).

In a break from Mark Series tradition, the Continental spare-tire hump on the decklid was left out of the design of the two concept cars.

Another concept car was introduced in 2007, called the Lincoln MKR. It was a premium four door fastback sedan based on the Ford Mustang platform which influenced the design themes of production Lincolns for a number of years.

=== Mark LT (2005–2008) ===
After the discontinuation of the Blackwood after a single year of production in 2002, Lincoln stayed out of the pickup truck market for three years. In 2005, the division tried again with the Lincoln Mark LT. As with the Blackwood, the Mark LT was based on the crew-cab version of the F-150; a major change from the Blackwood was the availability of all-wheel drive and the use of a conventional pickup box. After the 2008 model year, the Mark LT was rebadged as the Platinum trim level of the Ford F-150 in the United States and Canada, remaining for sale only in Mexico until 2014.

=== Lincoln MK naming scheme ===
During the 1990s, American luxury brands such as Lincoln lost market share to German and Japanese brands. As Lincoln and Cadillac began modernizing their lineups during the early 2000s, they both began to adopt alphanumeric naming schemes used by their competitors. At Lincoln, this started with the 2000 LS, which created some objections by Toyota, the owners of Lexus. As the LS and the Continental were both discontinued in the mid-2000s, the division introduced a new alphanumeric naming scheme that would partly revive the Mark Series. From 2007 to 2015, all newly introduced Lincolns would wear the "MK" designation; the lone exceptions were the Town Car and the Navigator. With the "MK" designation, it was originally intended to be pronounced "Mark" followed by the vehicle model letter as in "Mark S", "Mark T", "Mark X" or "Mark Z". Once the new naming convention reached the initial public, "MK" was commonly mispronounced "em kay" and it was decided by Lincoln marketing to officially pronounce it that way instead. After the 2011 model year, the Navigator became the sole non-MK Lincoln as the Town Car sedan was discontinued. However, for 2017 Lincoln discontinued the MKS and brought back the Continental name for its all-new flagship sedan. Since then Lincoln has brought back conventional names for successive model replacements.

== See also ==
- Cadillac Eldorado
- Imperial
- Mercedes-Benz S-Class Coupé

== Bibliography ==
- Flory, J. "Kelly" Jr. (2008). American Cars, 1946–1959: Every Model, Year by Year. McFarland & Company. ISBN 978-0-7864-3229-5.
- Flory, J. "Kelly" Jr. (2004). American Cars, 1960–1972: Every Model, Year by Year. McFarland & Company. ISBN 978-0-7864-1273-0.
- Iacocca, Lido A. (1984), William Novak (ed.), Iacocca: An Autobiography, Bantam Books, ISBN 978-0553051025, LCCN 84045174.
