= Lincoln Navicross =

Overview
- Manufacturer: Lincoln (Ford); Stola
- Production: 2003 (Concept car)

Body and chassis
- Class: Mid-size luxury car
- Body style: 4-door sedan
- Layout: F4 layout
- Platform: N/A Unknown
- Related: Lincoln Continental

Chronology
- Successor: Lincoln MKR

The Lincoln Navicross was a concept, created by Lincoln and presented at the 2003 Detroit Auto Show.

The vehicle featured styling elements similar to those of the Zephyr and MK9 concept car. Two chrome accent bars placed on the vehicle's left and right front fenders ran the full length of the vehicle as in the MK9 and Mark X concepts. The vehicle featured Lincoln's hallmark waterfall grille with the Lincoln emblem at its center. Much like the MKS concept models presented at the 2006 Detroit Auto Show, the Navicross featured center opening doors which according to Ford, gave "unrestricted ingress and egress to the luxurious interior." Center opening doors also appeared in the Continental concept car and the MKS concept car.

The interior featured power adjustable, climate controlled leather seats along with a "symmetrical" dashboard that like other Lincoln concept models and the Zephyr production model featured both metal as well as more woodgrain trim.

The Navicross concept was 186.6 in (4,740 mm) long and featured 20-inch alloy wheels along with a supercharged 4.2 L V8. Permanent all wheel drive and Hill Descent Control (HDC) were among the technical highlights of the concept vehicle.
