= Lincoln Sentinel =

Overview
- Manufacturer: Lincoln (Ford)
- Designer: Rick Wells, Paul Hudacek, Camillo Pardo, Tyler Blake, and Steve Eum

Body and chassis
- Class: Full-size car (E)
- Body style: 4-door luxury sedan
- Layout: Front-engine, rear-wheel-drive

Powertrain
- Engine: 6 L (366 cu in) V12

Dimensions
- Length: 5,486 mm (216 in)
- Width: 1,880 mm (74 in)
- Height: 1,346 mm (53 in)

The Lincoln Sentinel is a 4-door luxury sedan concept car designed by Ford's Dearborn Advanced studio. It debuted at the 1996 North American International Auto Show.

== Design ==
Ford says the Sentinel aimed to blend their New Edge design language with classic Lincoln styling themes, with the design of the Sentinel taking inspiration from past Continental models. The grille resembles a modernized version of the grille on the original Continental, while the uncluttered bodysides and suicide doors are inspired by the 1961 Continental. The concept uses a gloss black paint and features tinted windows, and three-tier vertical headlights at the front and the rear. It rides on 20-inch wheels. Rear-view cameras are used in place of traditional mirrors, and in place of traditional door handles are flush door handles.

The interior was designed by Ghia.

The grille of the Sentinel concept inspired the grille on the Lincoln MKX.

== Powertrain ==
The Sentinel used a 6-liter V12 engine made by combining two 3.0 L Ford Duratec V6 engines. Official power figures were never released for the Sentinel, but in the Ford Indigo concept, which used the same engine, the V12 produces 435 hp (324 kW; 441 PS) at 6100 rpm and 405 lb⋅ft (549 N⋅m) of torque at 5250 rpm.
