= Lincoln Aviator EX8 =

- Lincoln Aviator EX8 test mule

Overview
- Manufacturer: Lincoln
- Model code: CX810
- Production: 2026–present
- Model years: 2027–present
- Assembly: China: Chongqing (Changan Ford, 2026–present)

Body and chassis
- Class: Mid-size luxury SUV
- Body style: 5-door SUV

Dimensions
- Wheelbase: 3,010 mm (118.5 in)
- Length: 5,055 mm (199.0 in)
- Width: 1,995 mm (78.5 in)
- Height: 1,790–1,800 mm (70.5–70.9 in)

The Lincoln Aviator EX8 (Chinese: 林肯飞行家EX8; pinyin: Línkěn Fēixíngjiā EX8) is a mid-size luxury crossover SUV produced by Changan Ford, a joint venture between Chinese automaker Changan and American automaker Ford, and sold by Lincoln, Ford's luxury brand. It will launch in the first half of 2027.

== Overview ==
The Aviator EX8 was revealed through homologations made by China's Ministry of Industry and Information Technology on 3 November 2026. Despite using the Aviator nameplate, it is unrelated to the existing Aviator. Instead, it was designed for and offered exclusively in the Chinese market. The "E" stands for new energy, the "X" stands for the versatility of an crossover SUV, and the "8" denotes the 8-series segment in China's automotive market features large five-seat configuration.

The design of the Aviator EX8 draws inspiration from Art Deco architecture and design of the 1920s and 1930s, It incorporates the vertical radiator grille styling of the 1930s Lincoln-Zephyr, paired with the flat beltlines and geometric wheel elements inspired by the 1940s Lincoln Continental.

It uses a two-row, five seat configuration.

=== Powertrain ===
The Aviator EX8 is only offered with one plug-in hybrid powertrain, using a 1.5-liter turbocharged engine producing 110 kW (150 hp; 150 PS). It uses lithium iron phosphate (LFP) batteries and achieves a top speed of 205 km/h (127 mph).
