= Lincoln MK9 =

Lincoln MK9 Lincoln Mark X
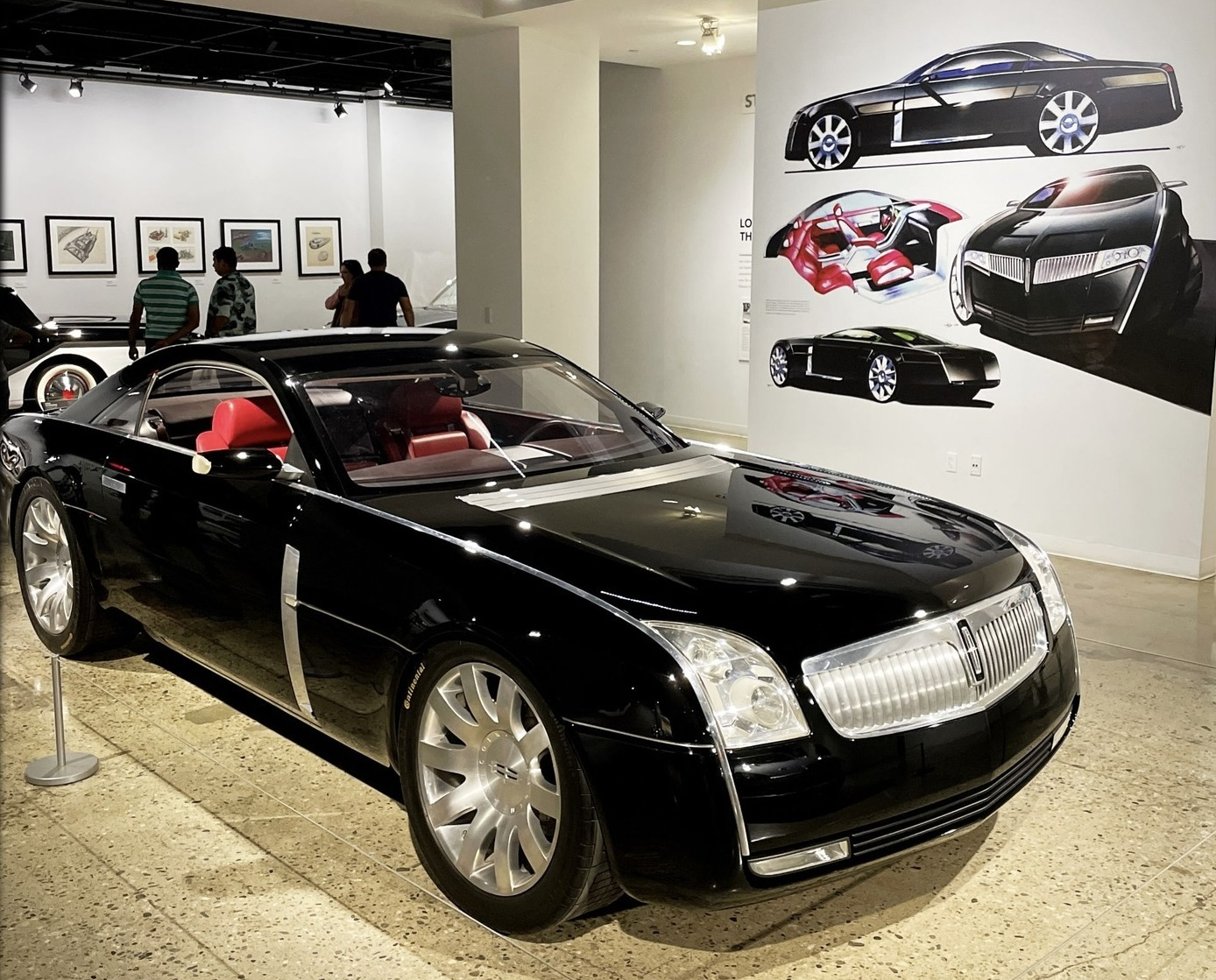
- Lincoln MK9 at the Petersen Automotive Museum

Overview
- Manufacturer: Lincoln (Ford); Stola
- Production: 2001 (MK9); 2004 (Mark X)
- Designer: Gerry McGovern

Body and chassis
- Class: Full-size personal luxury car
- Body style: 2-door coupé (MK9); 2-door convertible (Mark X)

The Lincoln MK9 is a two-door concept coupe presented by Lincoln in 2001 at the New York International Auto Show, and was intended to explore the possibility of a new Mark Series model to succeed the discontinued Mark VIII.

The MK9 was built by Italian coachbuilder Stola on a stretched version of Ford’s DEW architecture used in the Lincoln LS and Ford Thunderbird and was built to run and drive. The MK9 is rear-wheel drive, with a V8 engine paired to an automatic transmission, and four wheel independent suspension.

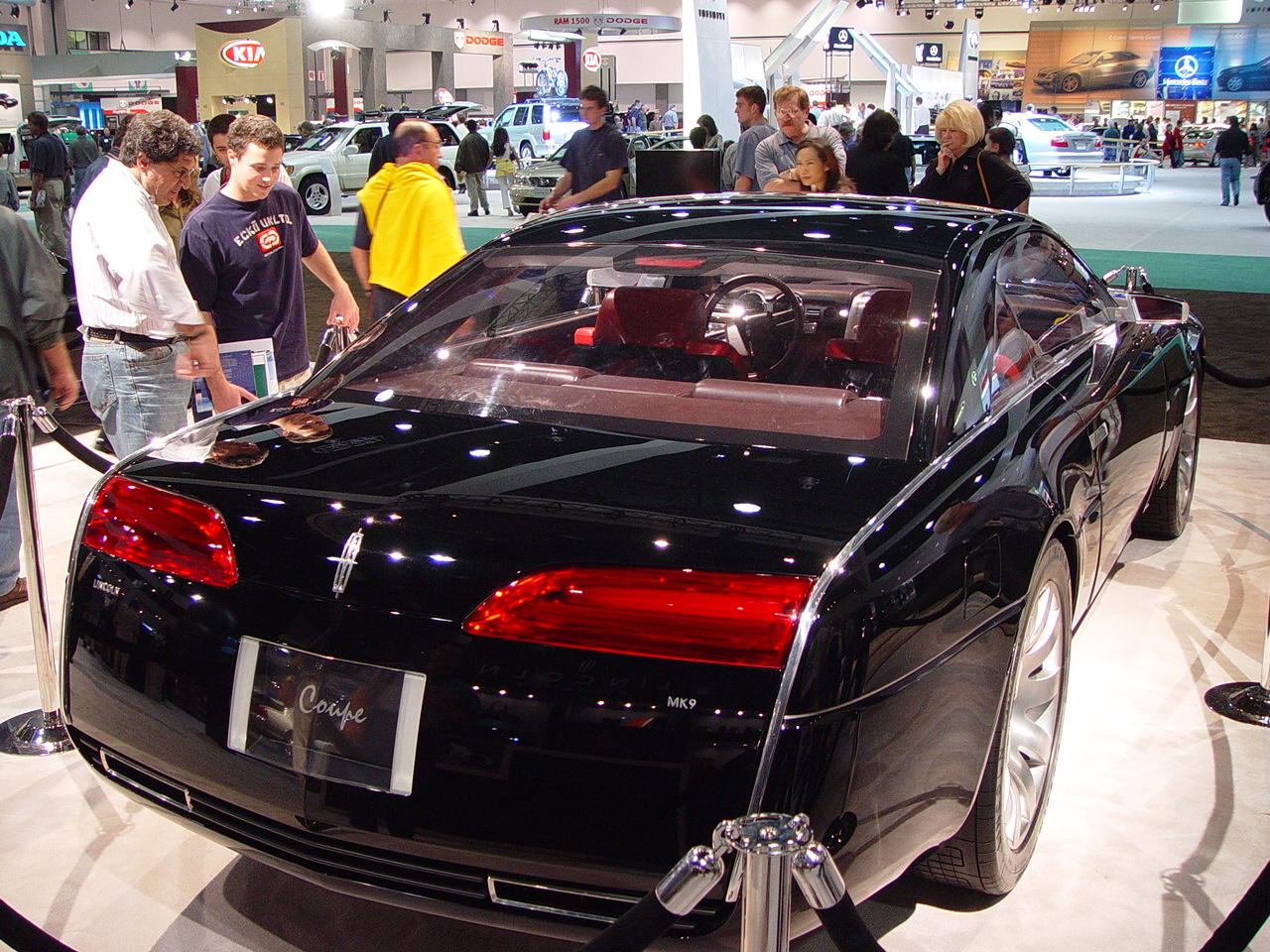
Lincoln MK9 rear end

The MK9 was designed under Lincoln design chief Gerry McGovern, with initial drawings by Marek Reichman and Adriana Monk. The design features a waterfall grille with a central Lincoln emblem; two full-length chrome accents on the vehicle's left and right shoulder and chrome accented air vents near the doors on the front fenders. The interior features lacquered wood and leather, dark cherry flooring, white leather headliner and red leather seats.

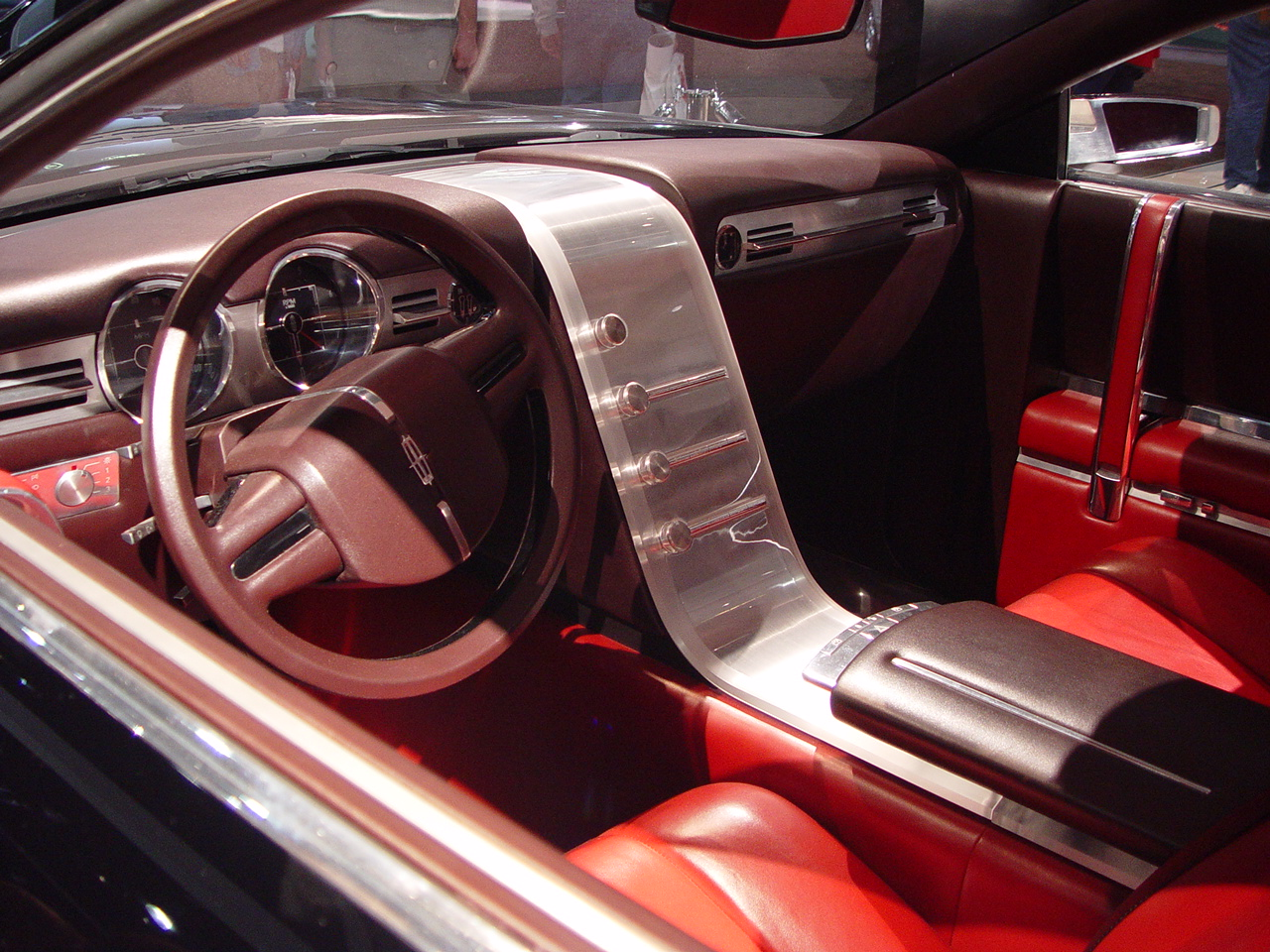
Lincoln MK9 interior

The MK9 concept introduced a new naming convention for Lincoln, using letter and number combinations. The naming system is similar to that of Mercedes-Benz or BMW, without referencing a vehicle's engine size.

The MK9 was auctioned off by Ford in 2010 and is currently owned by the Bortz Auto Collection.

== Lincoln Mark X ==
The Lincoln Mark X (pronounced Mark Ten) concept, introduced in 2004, was Lincoln's adaptation of the 2004 Ford Thunderbird body and chassis, with a retractable hard top in lieu of the Thunderbird's fabric top, with its removable hard top. Sharing some of its design elements with the MK9, the Mark X introduced an egg-crate chrome grille that recalled the grille of the 1964 Lincoln Continental and foreshadowed the grilles of forthcoming Lincoln vehicles.

The Mark X concept model featured a convertible panoramic glass roof. The interior was also based on a "Lincolnized" version of that in the standard Thunderbird (which itself is derived from the Lincoln LS) - which differentiated it from the MK9 interior. The Mark X's official press release described the interior as dressed in Lime Sorbet with white Corian accents, polished aluminum, dark chrome, natural grain leather seating surfaces, plush sheepskin flooring and tailored tone-on-tone stitching throughout. Its four-spoke, power-adjustable steering wheel also was leather wrapped.

The Mark X is 185" long, and featured 21" chrome alloy wheels. It is powered by a DOHC 3.9 L V8 with 280 hp (209 kW) mated to a 5-speed automatic transmission, the same drivetrain as the Thunderbird it was based on.

The Mark X was auctioned off by Ford in 2010 and was sold to James Powers, a former Ford designer in the 1950s and 1960s who, in the early 2000s, drew the original drawings that inspired the Mark X. The car was auctioned off again by Mecum Auctions in 2024.
