= Mercury (automobile) =

Automobile marque of the Ford Motor Company

- Type: Division
- Industry: Automotive
- Founded: November 4, 1938; 88 years ago
- Founder: Edsel Ford
- Defunct: January 4, 2011; 15 years ago
- Fate: Discontinued
- Headquarters: Dearborn, Michigan, U.S.
- Area served: North America and the Middle East
- Key people: Edsel Ford, founder
- Products: Automobiles
- Parent: Ford Motor Company

Mercury was a brand of medium-priced automobiles that was produced by American manufacturer Ford Motor Company between the 1939 and 2011 motor years. Created by Edsel Ford in 1938, Mercury was established to bridge the gap between the Ford and Lincoln model lines within the Ford Motor Company. From 1945 until its closure, it formed half of the Lincoln-Mercury Division of the company.

In addition to serving as a combined sales network for Ford's two premium automotive brands, Lincoln-Mercury also represented the Continental (1956–1960), Edsel (1958–1960, formally designated Mercury-Edsel-Lincoln Division), Comet (1960–1961), Capri (1970–1978), De Tomaso (1972–1975), and Merkur (1985–1989, forming Lincoln-Mercury-Merkur). Through the use of platform sharing and manufacturing commonality, Mercury vehicles often shared components and engineering with Ford or Lincoln (or both concurrently), serving as counterparts for vehicles from both divisions.

Following an extended decline in sales and market share for Mercury, Ford announced the closure of the division at the end of 2010.

== History ==
During the mid-1930s, under the leadership of Edsel Ford (1893–1943), son of Henry Ford (1863–1947), the Ford Motor Company discovered that it needed to expand its brand footprint to match its largest competitors. In 1935, Ford offered only its namesake brand and the cars of its more expensive luxury vehicles of its Lincoln Motor Company division. In contrast to the comprehensive line of brands available from General Motors (seven) and the Chrysler Corporation (four), Ford offered its Ford Standard/DeLuxe V8 range and the Lincoln Model K. In contrast to the Ford V8, the Model K was among the most expensive vehicles built and sold then in the United States, rivaled in price by the Cadillac V-12 (and V-16), Duesenberg Model J, and the flagship lines of the Germans' Mercedes-Benz and the British of Rolls-Royce.

To address the gap between Ford and Lincoln, the Ford Motor Company launched its own version of the late 1920s General Motors Companion Make Program, leading the company to expand from two nameplates to five by the end of the decade. For 1936, Lincoln-Zephyr was introduced as a sub-marque of Lincoln, giving the line a V12 car competing against the LaSalle and Buick, plus the notable revolutionary streamlining style of the Chrysler Airstream and the Airflow, along with the Packard One-Twenty. For 1938, De Luxe Ford became a sub-marque of Ford, offering a higher-price V8 car with a model-specific interior and exterior trim.

In 1937, Edsel Ford began work on Mercury as a completely new brand, personally selecting the Roman god's name from over 100 options – in spite of the name having been used just four years earlier for the Chevrolet Mercury and no fewer than seven separate failed automobile companies from 1903 to 1923. (Note: Each of the seven failing within two years of opening, including a manufacturer of steam-powered cars in San Francisco, California, and the Mercury Cyclecar Company, a 1913–1914 cyclecar manufacturer at 807 South Scotten Street in Detroit.)

In November 1938, Edsel Ford introduced four body styles of the Mercury Eight at the New York Auto Show. Along with a two-door sedan and a four-door sedan, the Mercury was also introduced as a two-door convertible and a two-door trunked sedan; the body design was overseen by E.T. 'Bob' Gregorie. While similar in concept to the modestly restyled De Luxe Ford, the V8-powered Mercury was an all-new car sized between the V8 Ford and the V12 Lincoln-Zephyr.

=== 1939–1940s ===
For 1939, the Mercury was launched at a starting price of US$916 ($21,202 in 2025 dollars); over 65,800 vehicles were sold in the inaugural model year. In response to the popularity of the model line, Ford revised its branding structure after 1940; De Luxe Ford was discontinued as a sub-marque (returning to its previous use as a Ford trim line), and all Lincolns became derived from the Lincoln-Zephyr (including the Continental) as Lincoln retired the Model K.

For 1941, the Mercury underwent its first redesign; in another change, the model line adopted the Mercury Eight nameplate used in sales literature. To consolidate development and production, the Mercury Eight shared much of its bodyshell with Ford, distinguished by its 4-inch (100 mm) longer wheelbase. To further separate the two model lines, the Eight was given a model-specific grille, exterior and interior trim, and taillamps. For the first time, a decorative wood-bodied station wagon (later nicknamed as a "woodie") was offered by the brand.

Unlike Ford products where components originated from the Ford River Rouge Complex outside Detroit, Michigan and shipped in knock-down kits to dozens of cities across the United States, all Mercury vehicles only originated completely assembled from River Rouge until 1952 when Wayne Stamping & Assembly Company started production and was the only location that created Mercury components which were sent to only three cities that had dedicated assembly branch factories that completed Mercury vehicles until 1960. This approach was also used for Lincoln vehicles which only originated from the Lincoln Motor Company Plant until 1958 when Wixom Assembly Plant replaced the old Lincoln plant and completed assembly and became the component location for all Lincoln vehicles and the Ford Thunderbird and sent knock-down kits to selected branch locations in the United States.

For 1942, Mercury implemented several changes to the Eight. As part of an interior redesign, the Eight received a dashboard configured similar to the Lincoln Zephyr. For the first time, the Flathead V8 was offered with 100 hp (100 PS; 75 kW) in standard form. To compete with Fluid Drive (Chrysler) and Hydramatic (General Motors), the 1942 Mercury offered Liquamatic, the first semi-automatic transmission offered by Ford Motor Company. Shared with Lincoln, Liquamatic proved complex and unreliable, with many systems replaced by conventional manual transmissions. As production was suspended following the outbreak of World War II, Ford produced only 24,704 1942 Mercury vehicles.

Following the rise of Henry Ford II at Ford Motor Company in September 1945, the divisional structure of the company underwent further change. On October 22, 1945, Ford merged Mercury with Lincoln Motor Company, creating the combined Lincoln-Mercury Division. While functioning as a single entity, Lincoln-Mercury would continue to market both namesake model line. The Lincoln-Zephyr reentered production following the war, dropping the Zephyr nameplate; the Continental (and the V12 engine) ended production after 1948.

On November 1, 1945, the first 1946 Mercury vehicles rolled off the assembly line. In line with Lincoln and Ford (and virtually all American-manufactured vehicles), 1946 production was functionally unchanged from 1942. The Eight underwent several minor revisions, including the return of vertically oriented grille trim. As few were installed before the 1942 suspension of production, Mercury did not return the Liquamatic transmission option. Alongside the wood-paneled station wagon, Mercury introduced a wood-bodied Sportsman convertible. For 1947 and 1948, few major changes were made. The rare Sportsman convertible was dropped for 1947 and the hubcaps were restyled; 1948 Mercurys were effectively carryover.

In 1949, Ford Motor Company launched its first all-new post-war designs for all three of its model lines. In contrast to the 1941–1948 Mercury, the 1949 redesign placed Mercury and Lincoln within a common bodyshell. Largely distinguished by headlight and grille designs, Mercury and Lincoln would also feature separately-trimmed interiors. Mechanically, Ford, Lincoln, and Mercury each offered a separate version of the Ford Flathead V8.

For many years after its production, the 1949–1951 Mercury Eight (most commonly in two-door form) would develop a following as a street rod, making an appearance in several films.

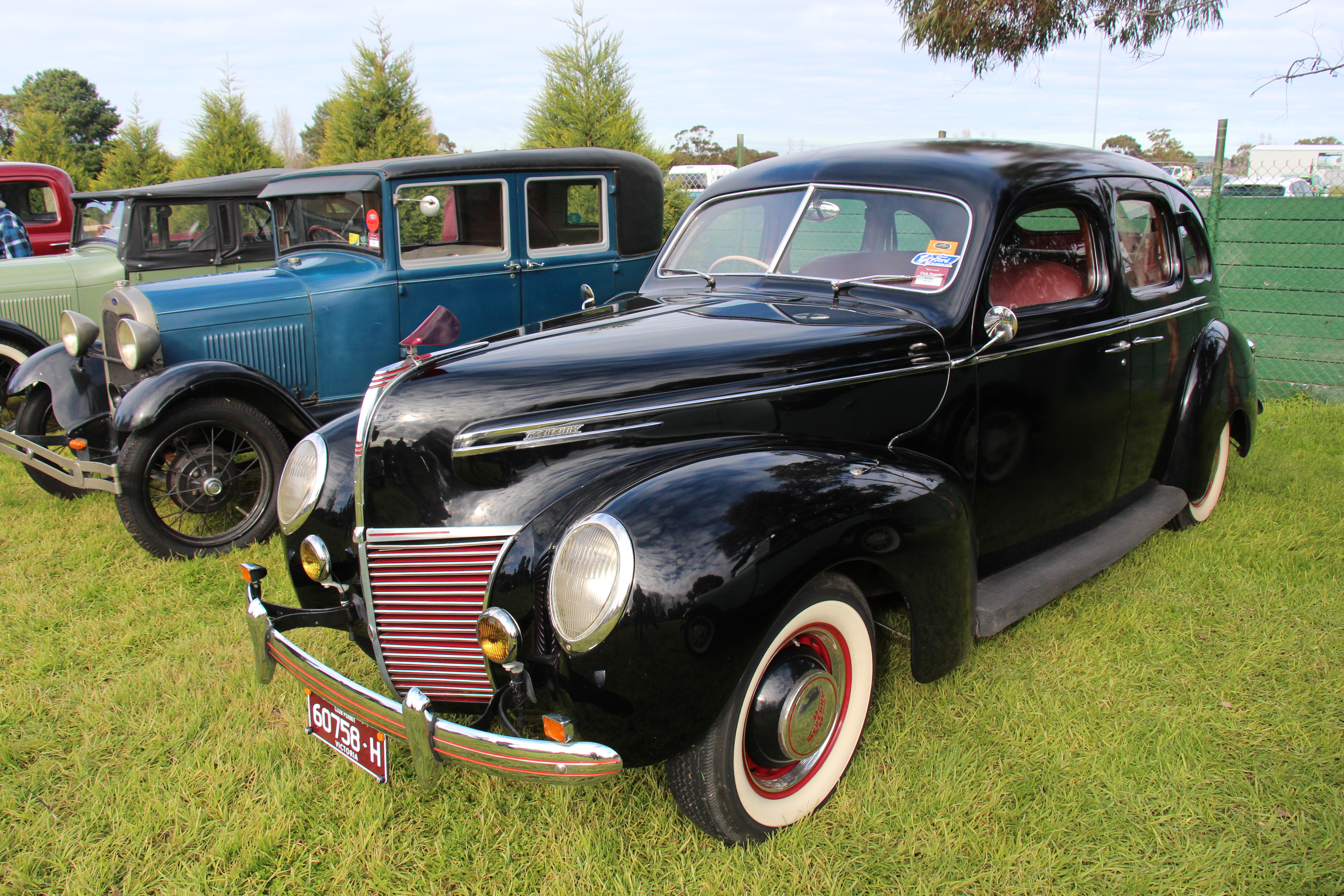
1939 Mercury Model 99A

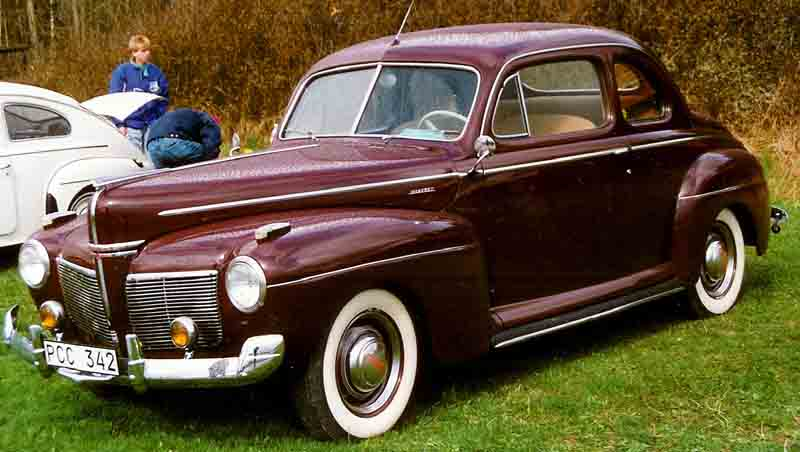
1941 Mercury Eight coupe

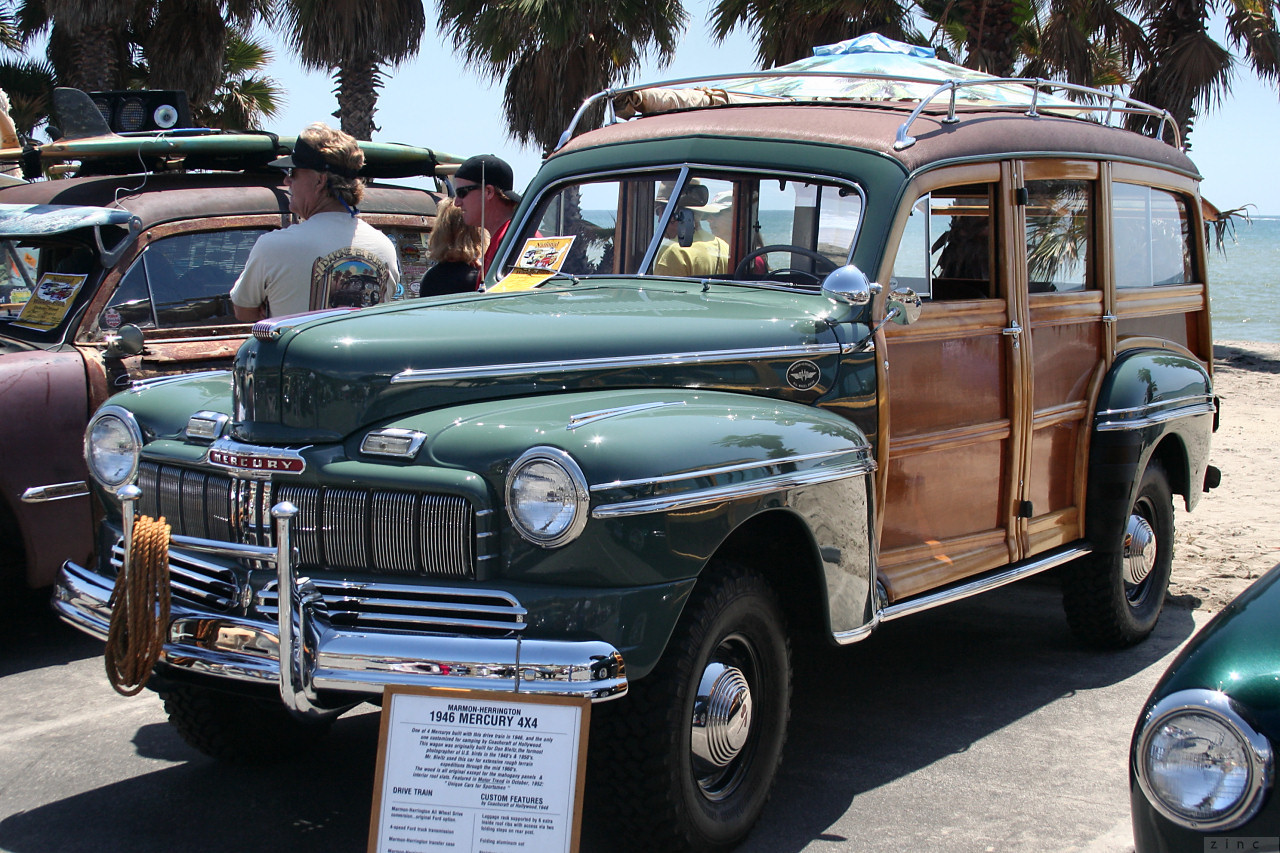
1946 Mercury station wagon (Marmon-Herrington 4x4 conversion)

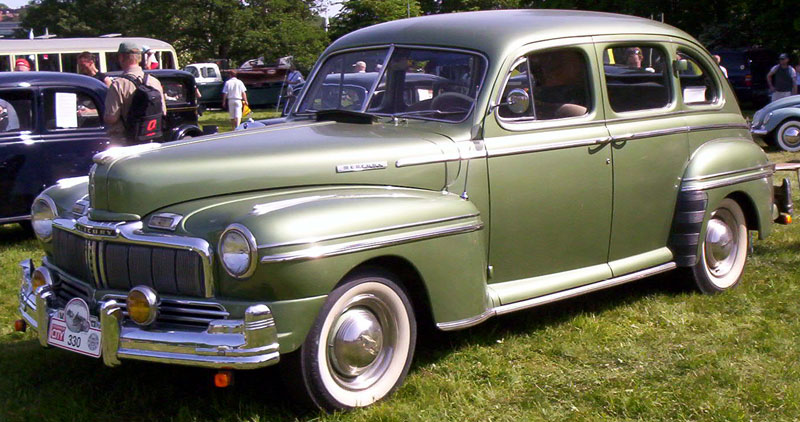
1947 Mercury Town Sedan

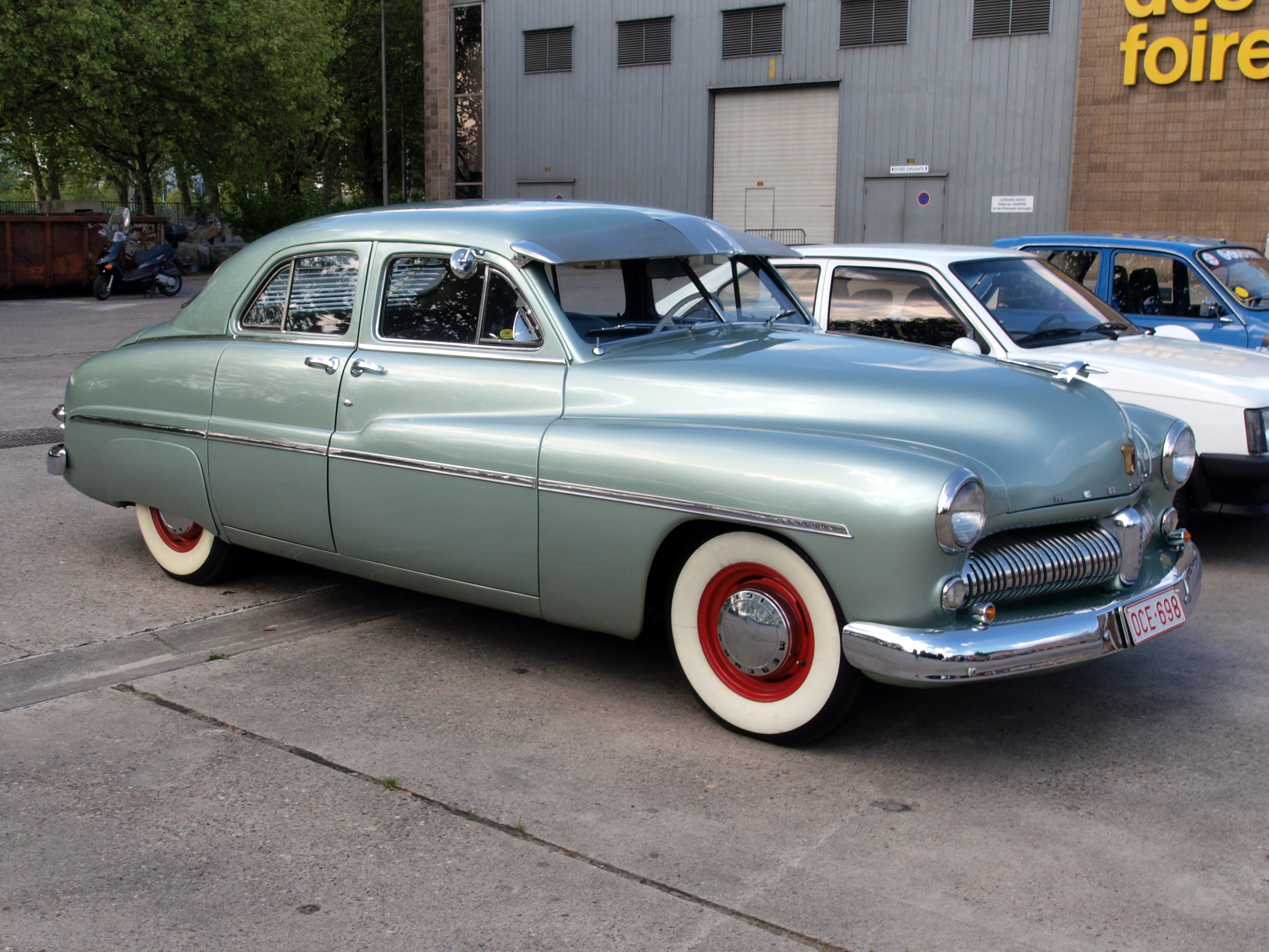
1949 Mercury Eight sedan

=== 1950s ===
The 1949 redesign of the Mercury model line proved successful, with the division increasing its sales six-fold over 1948, becoming the sixth-most popular brand in the United States. In contrast to competing medium-price brands from Chrysler and General Motors (and independents including Nash, Hudson, or Packard), Mercury continued to offer the Eight as its sole model line.

For 1950, the Monterey name made its first appearance, denoting a special edition of two-door coupes (alongside the Lincoln Lido and Ford Crestliner). Intended to compete against the hardtop coupes from General Motors, the Monterey simulated the appearance of a convertible through the use of a canvas or vinyl roof (though with a pillared roofline). During the year, the one-millionth Mercury vehicle was produced. In 1951, Mercury regained an automatic transmission option (for the first time since the 1942 Liquamatic), with the "Merc-O-Matic" 3-speed automatic (a rebranding of Ford Cruise-O-Matic).

For 1952, Mercury redesigned its model line, with two nameplates replacing the Eight. The Monterey returned as a distinct model line, slotted above the base-trim Custom; both shared bodies with Lincoln. In 1953, the expansion of the model line proved successful; after emerging from a war-depressed market, Mercury nearly doubled in sales, ranking eighth. While Mercury would have subsequently higher yearly sales, at 5%, this is the largest market share ever held by the division. For 1954, Ford replaced the long-running Flathead V8 (dating from 1932) with an overhead-valve Y-block V8, with Ford and Mercury receiving their own versions of the engine. As a submodel of the standard Monterey hardtop, the Monterey Sun Valley was introduced, featuring a fixed-panel acrylic glass sunroof. While offering an open-air interior, the Sun Valley was difficult to market in warm-weather climates (as the glass panel warmed the interior to uncomfortable temperatures).

In 1955, Mercury underwent a redesign of its model line. While again sharing much of its bodyshell with Lincoln, the division adopted the three-model range of Ford. As its premium model range, the Montclair was introduced above the Monterey (including the Sun Valley glass-top hardtop, for its final year). The revision proved successful, as Mercury reached its then-highest sales. The divisional structure of Ford was revised; Lincoln-Mercury was split (largely to accommodate the formation of the Continental division) In 1956, Mercury renamed the Custom the Medalist (to avoid confusion with the Ford Custom).

For 1957, Mercury redesigned its model range, with a 122-inch (3,100 mm) wheelbase sized between Ford and Lincoln. In a move upmarket, the slow-selling Medalist was discontinued, with the Monterey becoming the base model Mercury. Previewed by the 1956 XM-800 concept car, the Turnpike Cruiser (the pace car of the 1957 Indianapolis 500) was slotted above the Montclair, distinguished by its quad headlamps and retractable rear window. In line with Ford, Mercury station wagons became a distinct model line, with the Commuter, Voyager, and Colony Park; all Mercury station wagons were hardtops.

In 1958, to accommodate the introduction of Edsel, Ford revised its divisional structure, with Mercury, Edsel, and Lincoln forming a combined division (M-E-L). The Edsel Citation and Edsel Corsair shared their chassis (and roofline) with Mercury, with the entire division overlapping Mercury in price (a key reason behind its failure). The Park Lane was introduced as a flagship model line on a 125-inch (3,200 mm) wheelbase (with the Turnpike Cruiser becoming part of the Montclair line). Shared with Lincoln (and the Ford Thunderbird), Mercury introduced a 430 cubic inches (7.0 L) "Marauder" V8; optional on all Mercurys, a 400 hp (410 PS; 300 kW) "Super Marauder" version became the first mass-produced engine to be rated at 400 hp (410 PS; 300 kW).

For 1959, Mercury underwent a revision of its body, expanding to a 126-inch (3,200 mm) wheelbase. Coinciding with the discontinuation of the Edsel Corsair and Citation, Mercury produced its own body and chassis (for the first time since 1940). The division pared several slow-selling model lines, including the Turnpike Cruiser and Voyager; the two-door Commuter was in its final year. Mercury was one of the first American full size cars to adopt parallel-action windshield wipers.

As with many medium-price brands, the Mercury brand was hit hard by the economy of the late 1950s. While remaining eighth in sales from 1957 to the end of the decade, Mercury saw a 60 percent drop in sales in 1958, outranked by Rambler. While outselling the heavily marketed Edsel by over a two-to-one margin; it would take nearly 1958 and 1959 combined to match the 1957 sales total.

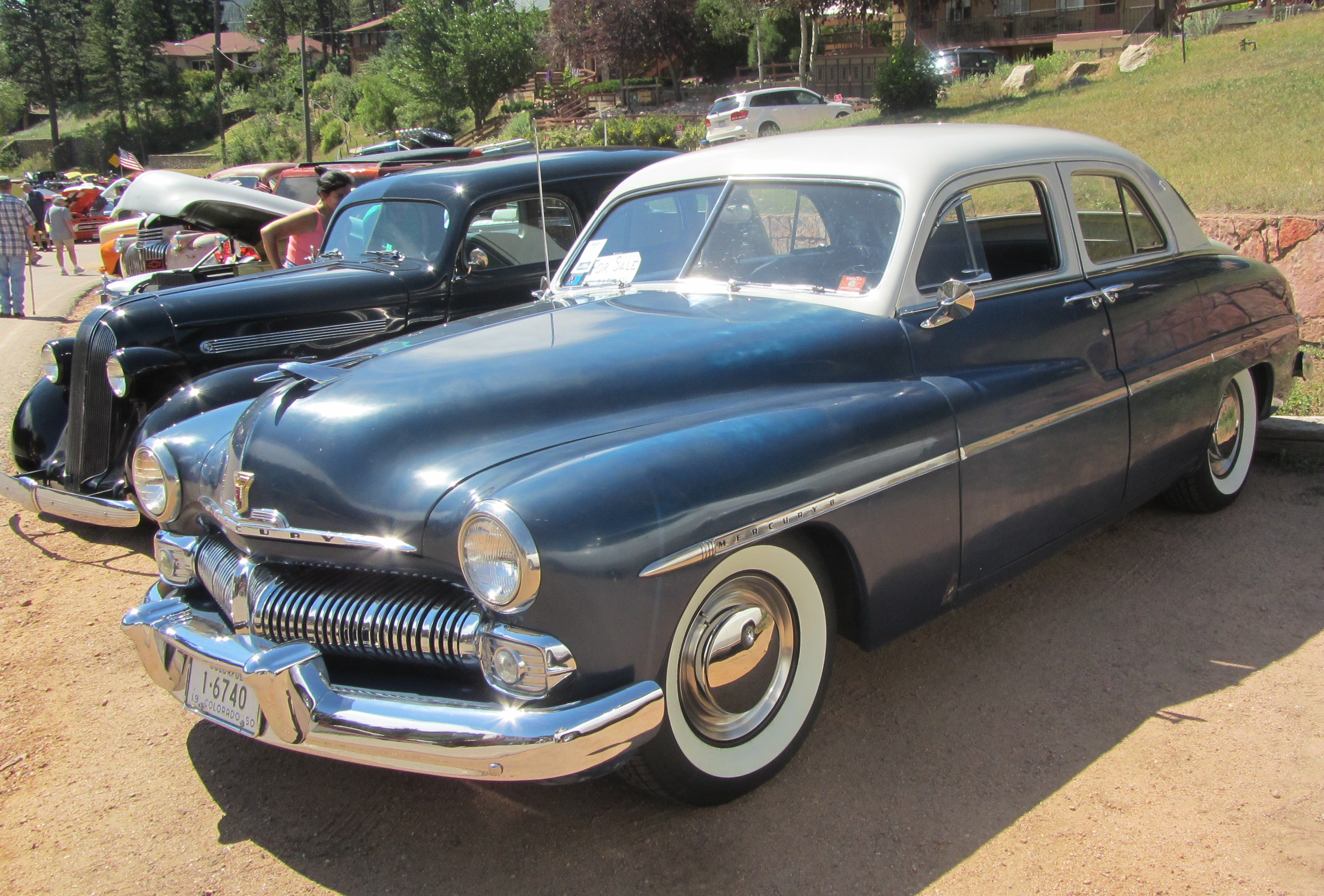
1950 Mercury Eight 4-door

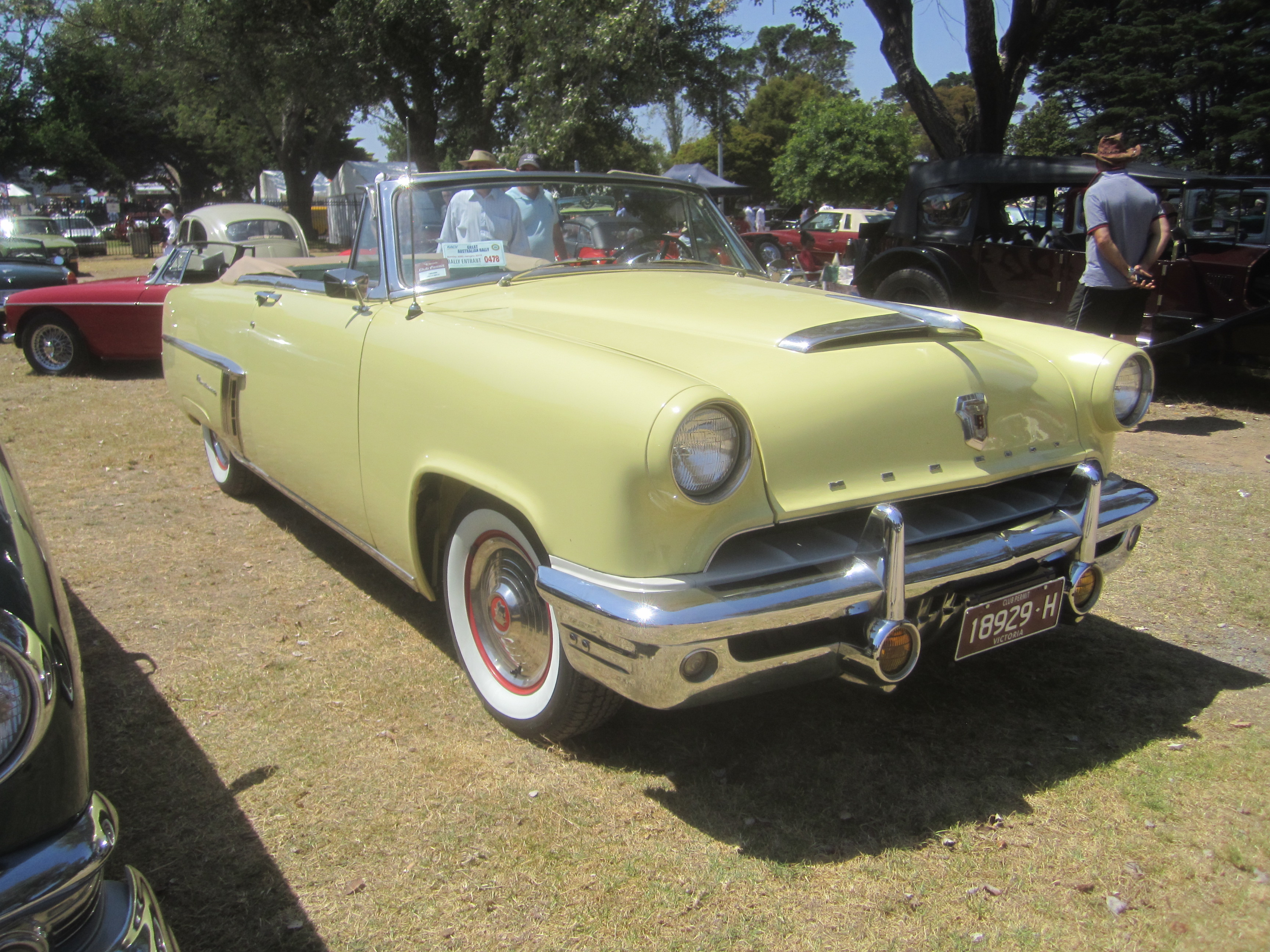
1952 Mercury Monterey convertible

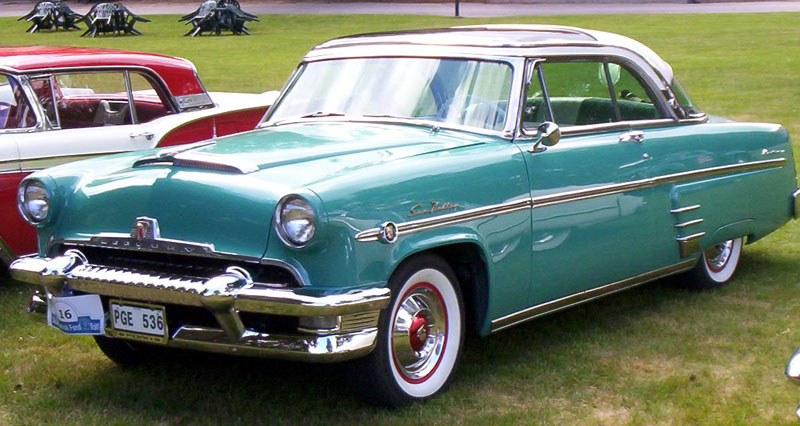
1954 Mercury Monterey Sun Valley

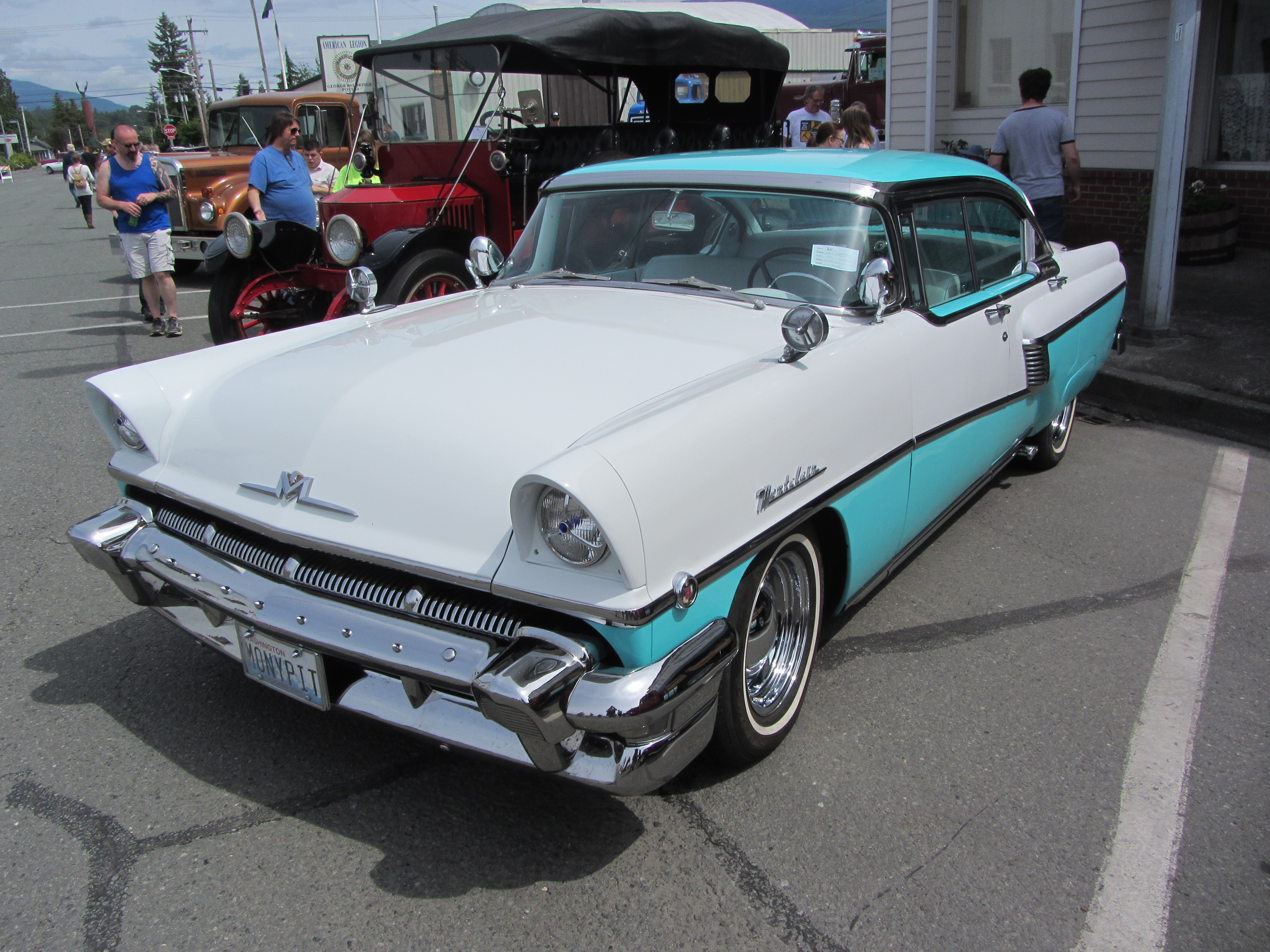
1956 Mercury Montclair 4-door hardtop

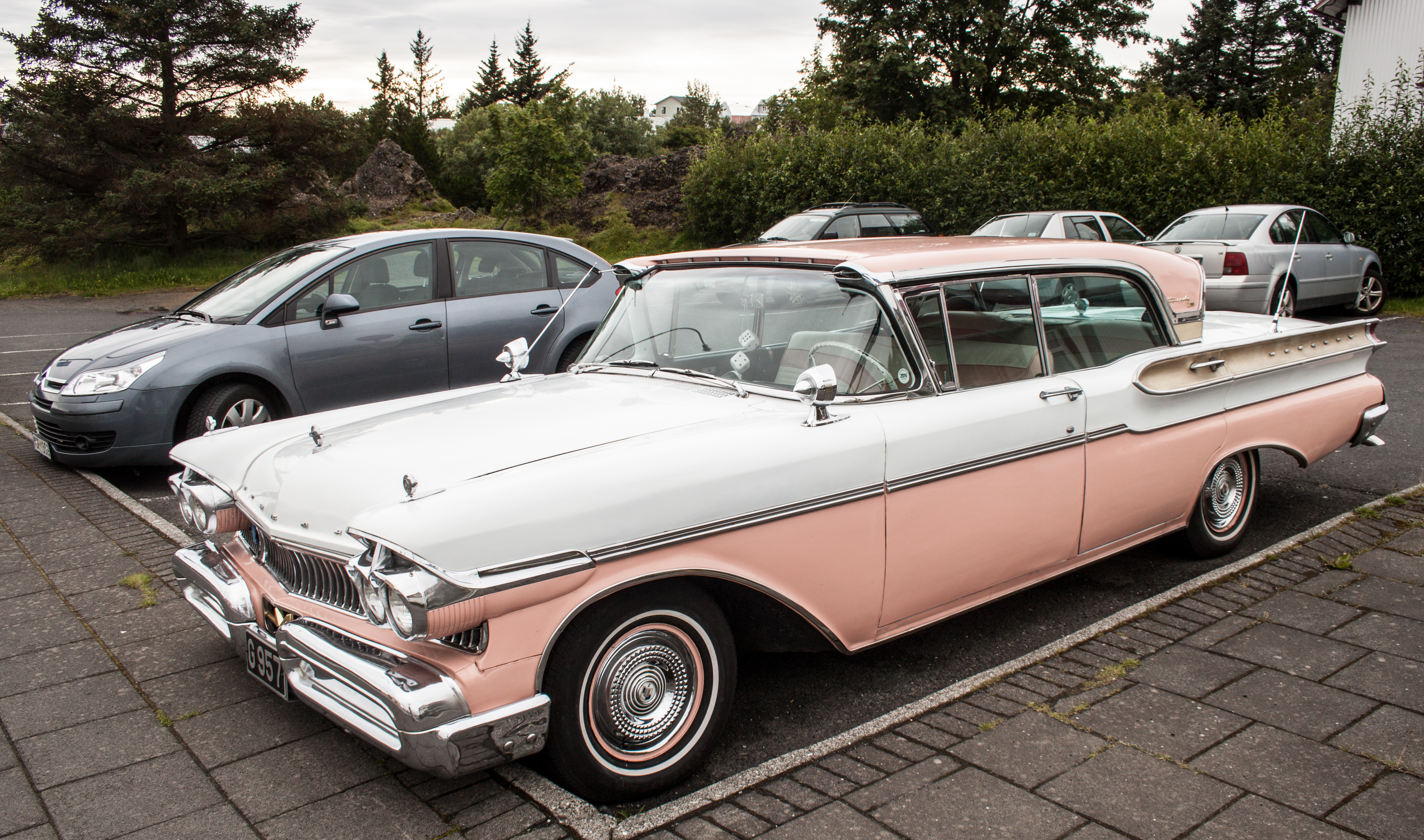
1957 Mercury Turnpike Cruiser 4-door hardtop

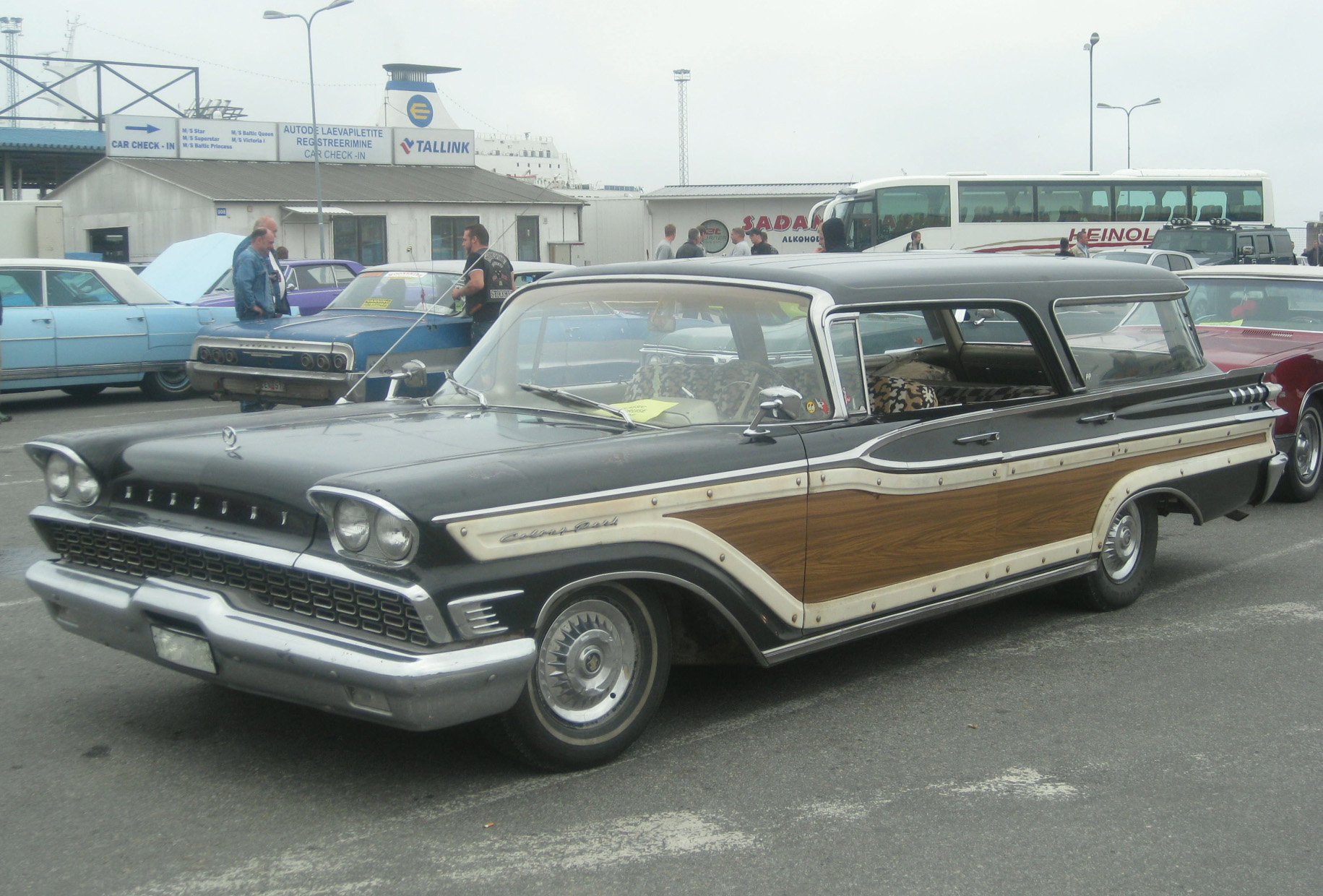
1959 Mercury Colony Park

=== 1960s ===
While affecting the American automotive industry as a whole, the economic recession of the late 1950s had the harshest impact upon medium-priced brands. Though Edsel was quietly discontinued early in the 1960 model year (before the end of 1959), the future of Lincoln-Mercury remained at risk, as Lincoln had lost over $60 million from 1958 to 1960 ($652,980,877 in 2025 dollars). To end the financial losses, several Ford executives (led by Ford President Robert McNamara) proposed restructuring Ford down to its namesake division. McNamara (prior to leaving Ford to become Secretary of Defense) allowed the Lincoln-Mercury division to remain, under several conditions. Lincoln reduced its model line from three to one, with the all-new Lincoln Continental offering a much smaller exterior footprint; to establish model continuity, the brand shifted to a nine-year model cycle (the longest for an American brand). With the closure of Edsel, Mercury was to share its body with Ford (on its own wheelbase). In place of the five divisional bodies produced in 1958 (Ford, Lincoln/Continental, Mercury, large Edsel, small Edsel), Ford produced two for 1961 (Ford/Mercury, Lincoln).

For 1960, the division released the Comet brand, its first compact car line. Originally developed for Edsel, the Comet was a divisional counterpart of the Ford Falcon (stretched to a 114-inch wheelbase); styled with four headlights (instead of two), the Comet was also fitted with wide tailfins. Coinciding with its Edsel origins and concerns about potential negative impacts of compact cars on the Mercury brand, the Comet was sold as a standalone product until the brands merged for the 1962 model year(similar to the first-generation Plymouth Valiant). Vehicle Identification plaques of 1960 and 1961 models read 'Made in U.S.A. by Comet.'

For 1961, Mercury released an all-new full-size range, dropping the Mercury-exclusive chassis in favor of sharing a chassis with the Ford Galaxie (extended to a 120-inch wheelbase). Though visibly sharing front doors with the Galaxie, the Mercury derived multiple elements of its styling from its 1960 predecessor. The Montclair and Park Lane were dropped in favor of the wider-selling Monterey; the Commuter and Colony Park station wagons returned. Slotted below the Monterey, the Mercury Meteor (as with the Comet) was a model line inherited from the closure of Edsel; as the Monterey matched the Ford Galaxie, the Meteor was a counterpart of the Fairlane.

1961 also brought the first 6-cylinder engine to the brand. The 1961 Meteor 600 featured a standard Mileage Maker Inline-6.

For 1962, Mercury brought its model range closer in line with Ford. The Meteor (after only one year of sale) was reintroduced as an all-new intermediate range (again following the design of the Ford Fairlane). For non-station wagons, Mercury introduced "S" sub-models to market sportier content. Along with higher-performance powertrains, the option packages included full-length floor consoles, floor shifters, and bucket seats with the S-22 (Comet), S-33 (Meteor), and S-55 (Monterey).

For 1963, the Monterey was designed with two different rooflines for each body configuration. The standard design was a "breezeway" reverse-slant rear window (similar to the 1958–1960 Continental), offered on all versions (except for the convertible). Introduced as a mid-year option, the "Marauder" fastback roofline was introduced for two-door sedans and hardtops (four-doors were added in 1964). Shared with the Ford Galaxie 500XL, the aerodynamically sleeker roofline helped Mercury gain ground in stock-car racing.

By the middle of the decade, the fate of Mercury was no longer entangled with the failure of Edsel, with a secure future competing against Buick and Oldsmobile, the middle of the Chrysler range, and the top of the American Motors range. For 1964, the Montclair and Park Lane were reintroduced while the S-models were dropped. For 1965, the full-size line underwent a complete redesign. Though again derived from the Ford Galaxie, the Monterey/Montclair/Park Lane adopted many styling elements from Lincoln, with Mercury marketing the line as "built in the Lincoln tradition".

For 1966, the Comet became the counterpart of the Ford Fairlane (effectively replacing the discontinued Meteor). After a two-year hiatus, the S-55 returned as a distinct higher-performance variant of the Monterey. In a design change, the fastback Marauder roofline was discontinued; the Breezeway design was dropped in 1967 (the latter, following the increasing availability of air conditioning units integrated within the ventilation system).

In 1967, Mercury debuted its two most successful and longest-running nameplates: the Mercury Cougar and Mercury Marquis. The Cougar was developed to bridge the gap between the Ford Mustang and the Ford Thunderbird, while the Marquis offered the division a competitor towards sedan lines such as the Buick Electra, Oldsmobile Ninety Eight, and Chrysler New Yorker. For 1967, the Marquis was available as a formal-roof 2-door hardtop (derived from the Ford LTD, but with its own roofline); the Mercury Park Lane Brougham was offered as flagship Mercury four-door sedan/hardtop. In various forms, the Marquis nameplate would be used by Mercury until its 2011 closure.

For 1968, the Mercury model range underwent two revisions to its intermediate range. The Mercury Montego (based on the Ford Torino) was gradually phased in to replace the Comet (dropped after 1969); the performance-oriented Mercury Cyclone became a stand-alone model range, slotted above the Cougar. To further establish the brand in motorsport, the aerodynamically optimized Cyclone Spoiler II was homologated as the 1969 Mercury entry for NASCAR.

For 1969, the full-size Mercury line was given an all-new body and chassis (again shared with Ford, on its own 124-inch wheelbase). The nameplates were again revised, with the Marquis becoming a full model range (replacing the Montclair and Park Lane outright) and the Colony Park as the only Mercury full-size station wagon. To differentiate the Marquis from the Monterey, Mercury introduced hidden headlights for the former. Replacing the S-55, the Mercury Marauder became a stand-alone full-size two-door, competing against the Oldsmobile Toronado and Buick Riviera; an optional 429 cubic-inch V8 was offered. Though still sharing its chassis with the Mustang, the Cougar was configurable as either a pony car, personal luxury coupe, or a muscle car, with an "Eliminator" performance package featuring an available 428 Cobra Jet V8.

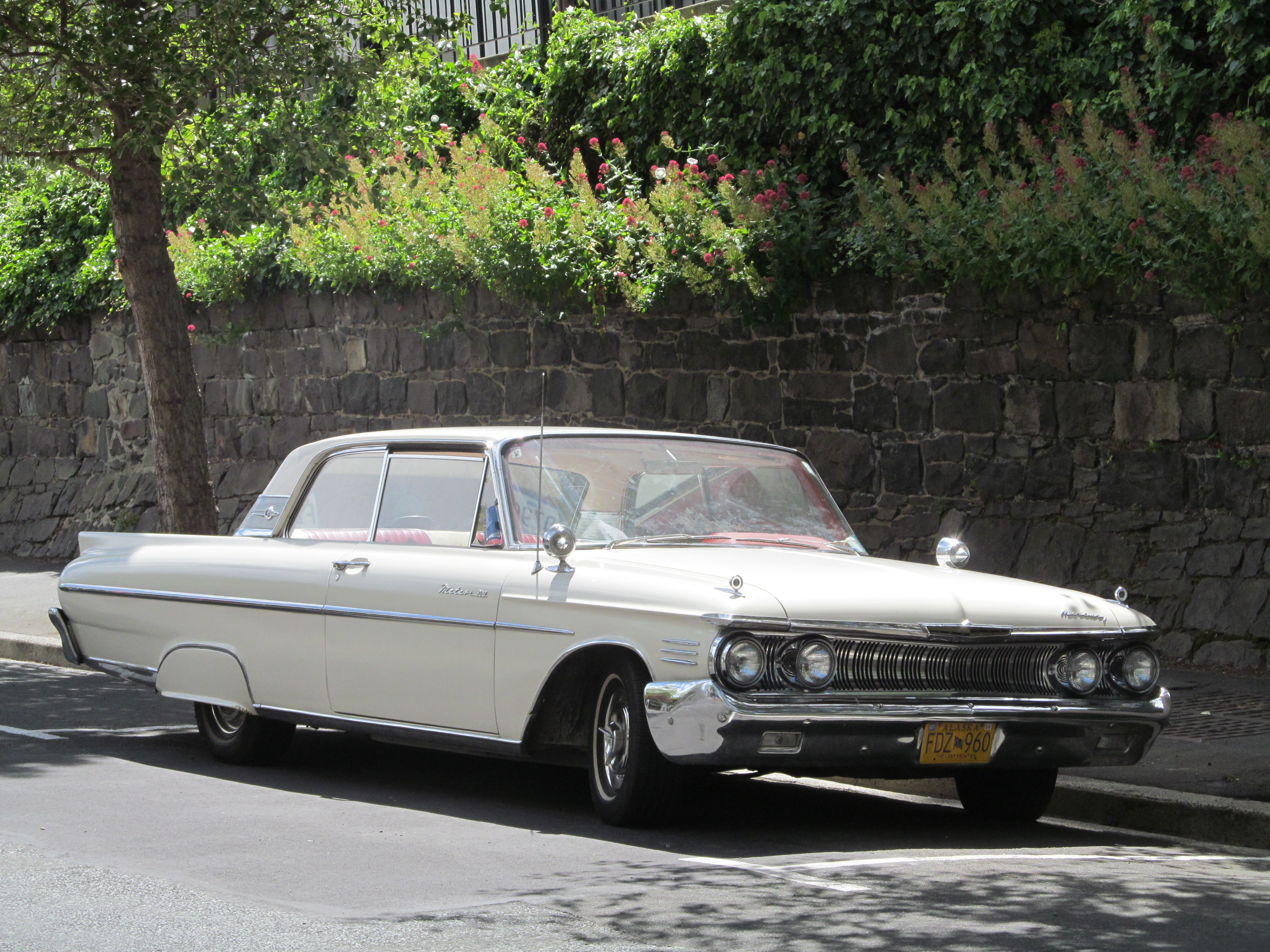
1961 Mercury Meteor 2-door hardtop

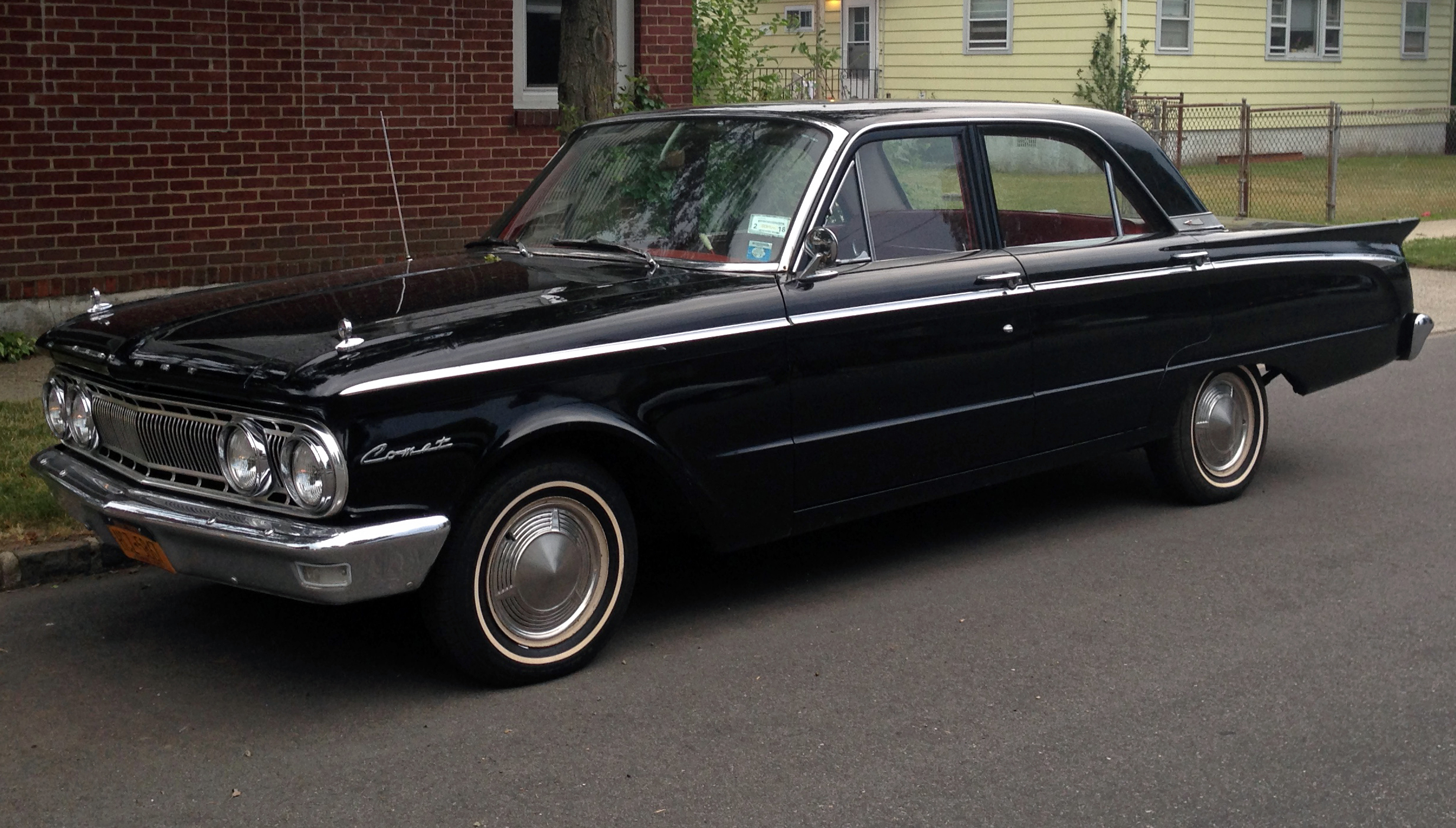
1962 Mercury Comet 4-door sedan

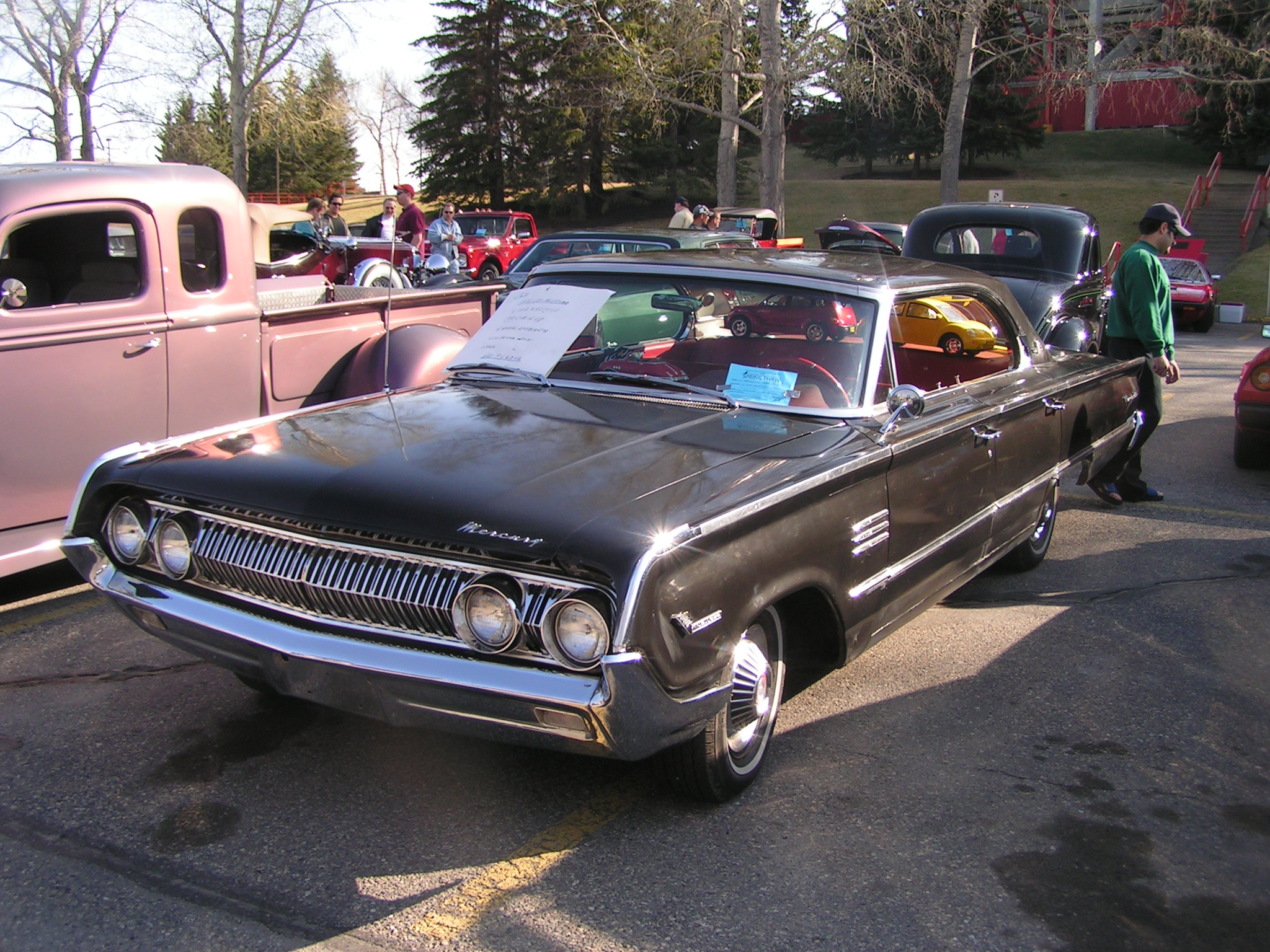
1964 Mercury Monterey Marauder

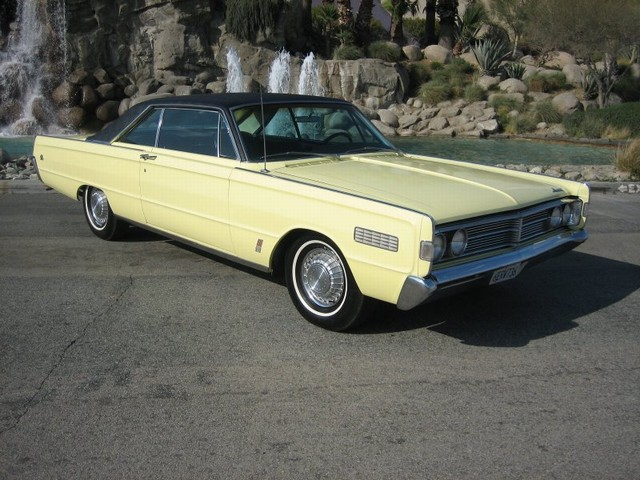
1966 Mercury S-55

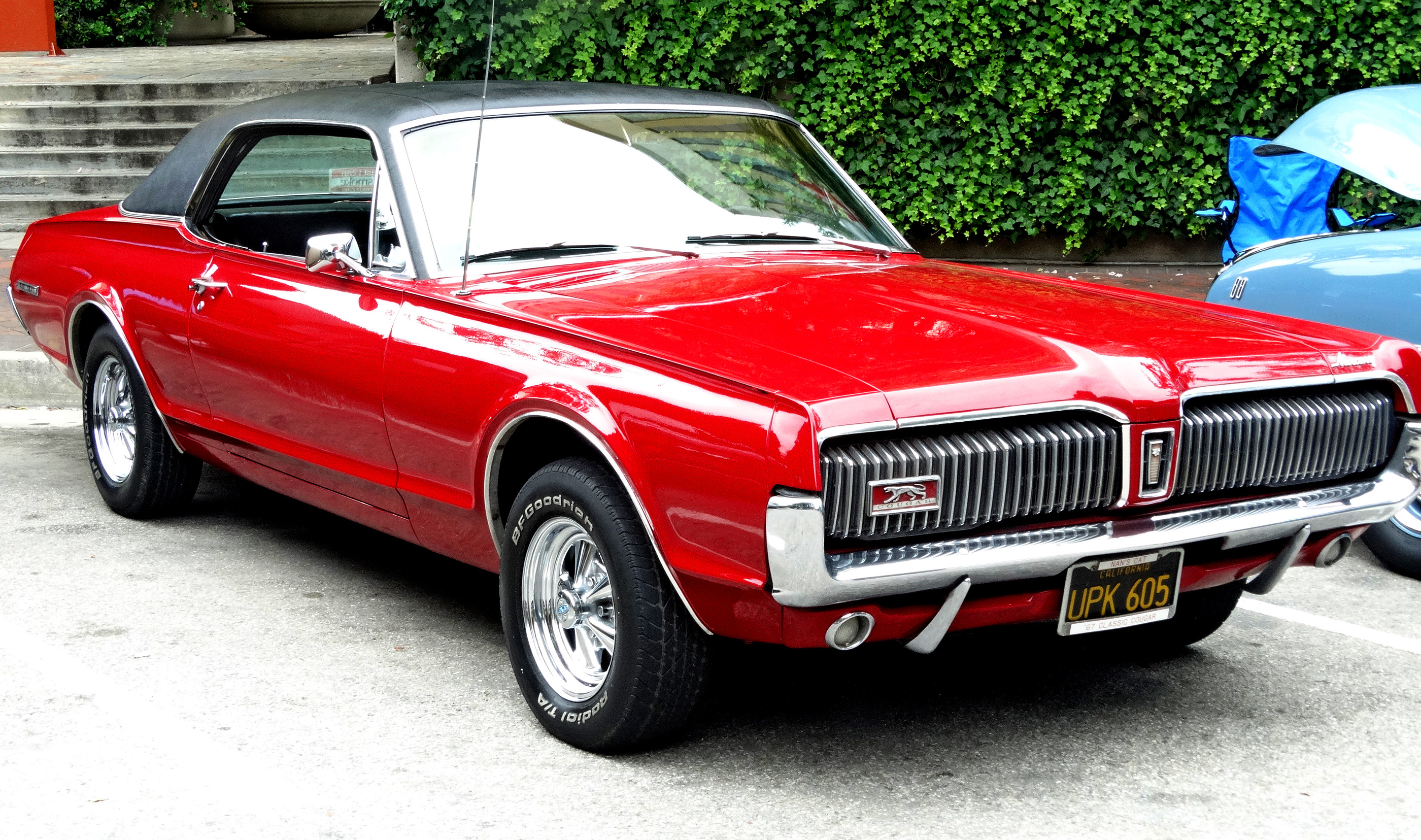
1967 Mercury Cougar (with after-market wheels)

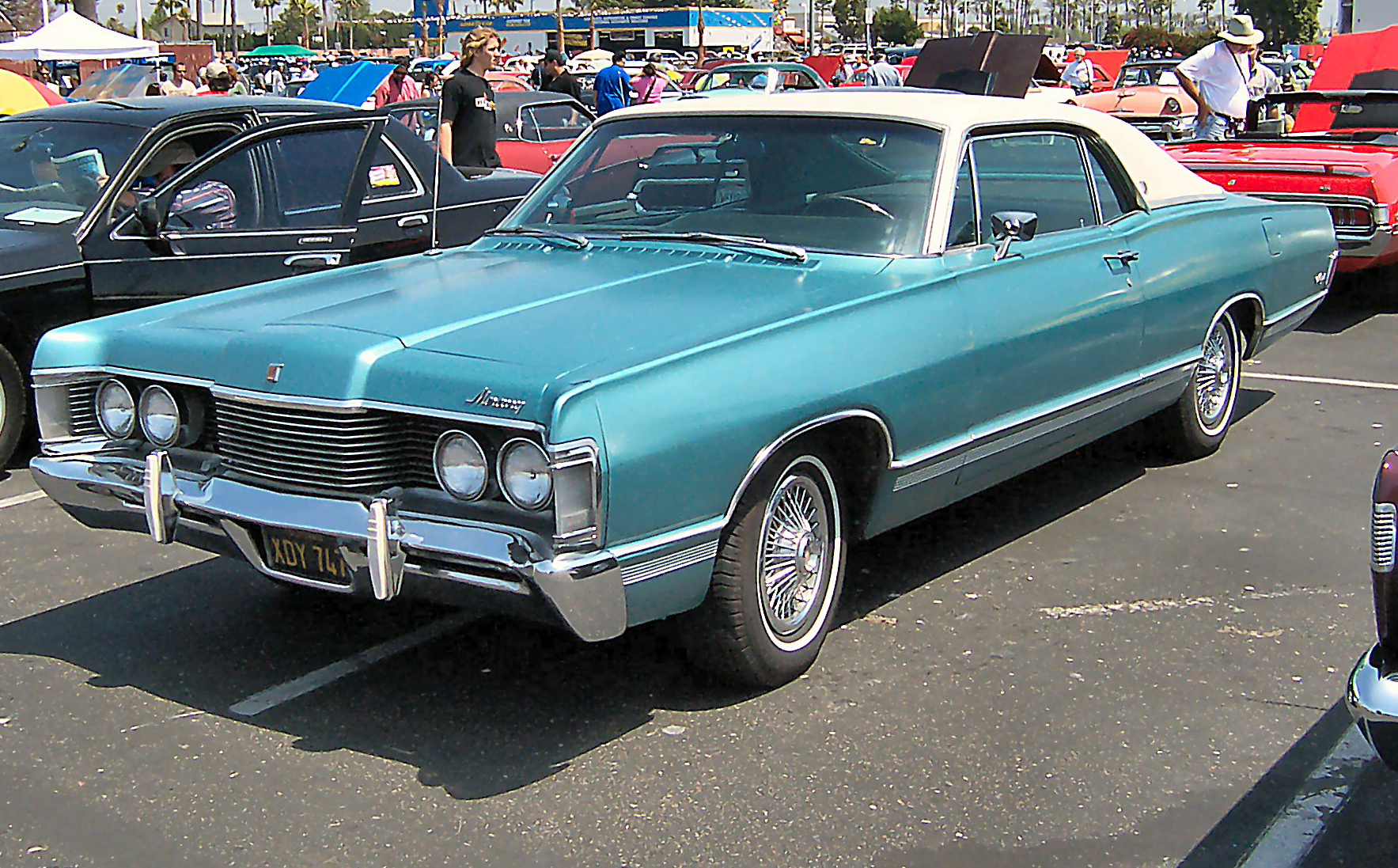
1968 Mercury Marquis

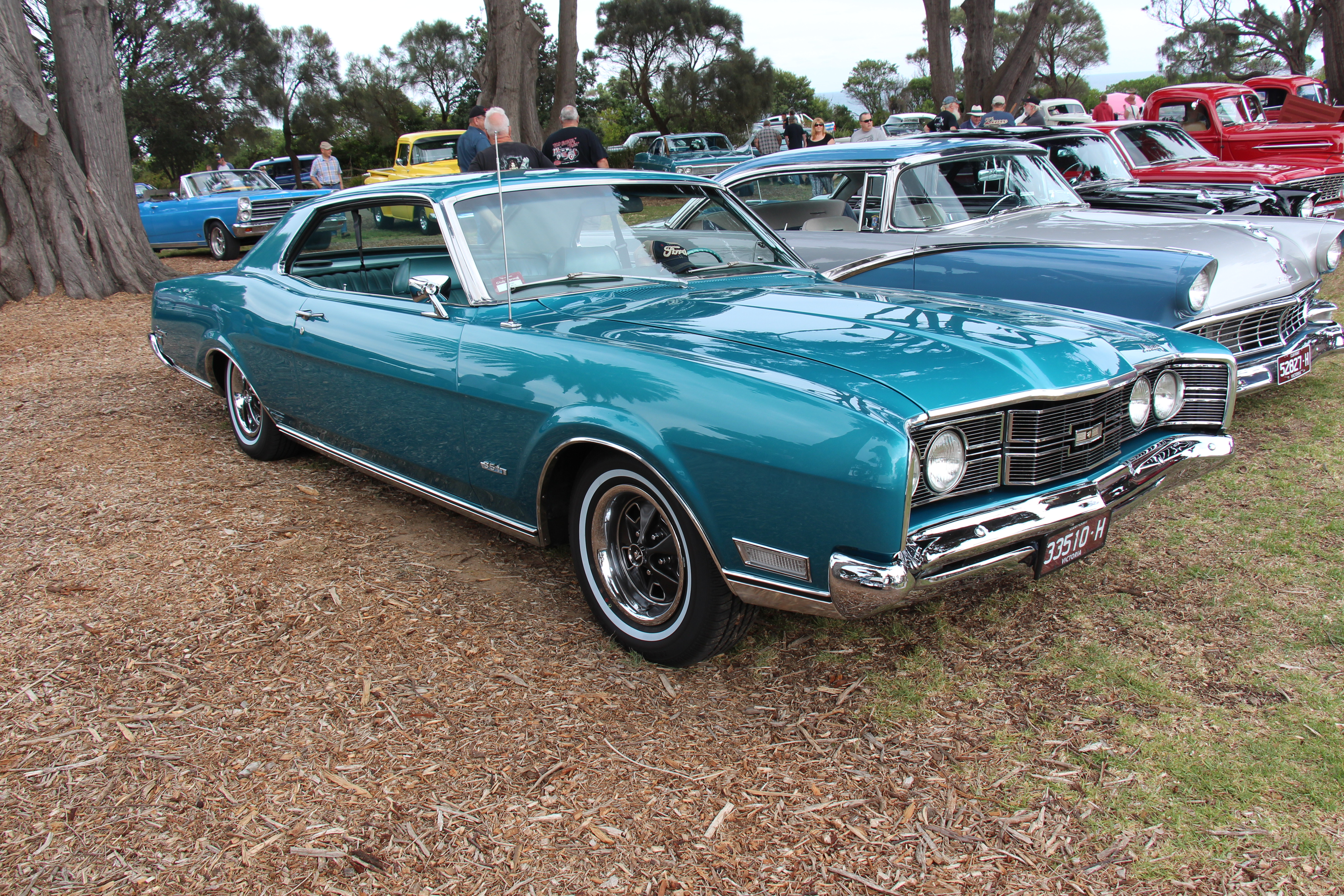
1969 Mercury Montego

=== 1970s ===
During the 1970s, the product line of the Mercury division was influenced by several factors that affected all American nameplates. While sporty cars would not disappear from the division, Mercury refocused itself further on its original purpose: building vehicles upmarket from Ford.

1970 marked the introduction of the Capri, the first subcompact car sold by the division. In place of marketing a counterpart of the Ford Pinto economy car, Mercury commenced captive imports of European Ford Capri from Cologne, Germany; the model line was among the first compact sports cars sold in the United States. The first Ford Motor Company vehicle in North America offered with (an optional) V6 engine, the Capri was sold through Lincoln-Mercury, but carried no divisional branding until 1979.

For 1971, Mercury gradually distanced itself away from performance vehicles. The Marauder was discontinued along with the Marquis convertible; the Brougham name made its return. The Cougar was updated alongside the Mustang, but was repackaged to compete more closely with the A-body coupes (Chevrolet Monte Carlo, Oldsmobile Cutlass Supreme, Pontiac Grand Prix) of General Motors. The Comet made its return as the smallest Mercury line, becoming a counterpart of Ford Maverick (and sharing its underpinnings with its 1960 namesake). At the other end of the performance spectrum from the Capri, Lincoln-Mercury began imports of the De Tomaso Pantera in 1971. Assembled in Modena, Italy, the Pantera was a two-door, mid-engine coupe powered by a 330 hp Ford 5.8L Cleveland V8.

For 1972, the intermediate Montego line (based on the Ford Gran Torino) was redesigned with a body-on-frame chassis, creeping into full-size dimensions. After years of losing market share to the Cougar, the Cyclone was quietly discontinued, with Mercury moving largely to the Cougar for racing.

The 1973 model year brought major functional changes to the Mercury line, the fuel crisis notwithstanding; in various forms, all Mercury cars were given 5-mph bumpers. The Marquis and Monterey were given an exterior update, adopting a "pillared hardtop" roofline (frameless door glass supported by a thin B-pillar). As American manufacturers shifted away from convertibles, the final convertible produced by Ford Motor Company during the 1970s was a 1973 Mercury Cougar.

1974 marked several changes, geared primarily towards the Mercury intermediate line. The Cougar underwent a redesign, growing in size to share the body of the Montego two-door hardtop and becoming the counterpart of the Ford (Gran Torino) Elite. The Montego saw its GT two-door fastback body discontinued. Lincoln-Mercury ended distribution of the DeTomaso Pantera after 1974, as American production of its 5.8L engine ended.

For 1975, the Mercury model range underwent a series of transitions. The long-running Monterey nameplate was discontinued, leaving the Marquis as the sole full-size Mercury. To expand its full-size offerings, a new Mercury Grand Marquis was introduced between the Marquis Brougham and the Lincoln Continental. Developed as the intended successor for the Comet, the Mercury Monarch led to a completely new market segment: the luxury compact car. Both the Grand Marquis and the Monarch were met with success, with the latter used as personal cars among Ford leadership (including Henry Ford II).

1976 saw the expansion of the smallest end of the Mercury model line. Introduced in Canada for 1975, the Mercury Bobcat gave the division its own version of the Ford Pinto subcompact. The Capri (devoid of devisional branding) became the Capri II, following its redesign in Europe. Following its update, the Capri II became the second most-imported car in the United States (behind the Volkswagen Beetle).

For 1977, Mercury made significant revisions to improve sales to its intermediate model range (its slowest-selling models). While technically a mid-cycle model update, the Montego was renamed the Cougar, as the model line (a counterpart of the renamed Ford LTD II) added two-door and four-door sedans and a station wagon for the first time. The previous Cougar XR-7 also was updated and now paired with the redesigned Ford Thunderbird; for the next two decades, the two model lines would share a common design. The change from Montego to Cougar was well-received, as sales of the model line nearly tripled. While V8 engines were now optional on some Buick and Oldsmobile model lines, the Grand Marquis remained with a standard 460 cubic-inch V8 (the second-largest displacement engine used in an American automobile).

1978 began a transition of the Mercury line that would lead into the 1980s. The Mercury Zephyr compact replaced the outdated Comet as a version of the Ford Fairmont. The Zephyr was an inaugural model line of the Fox platform, a chassis architecture that would underpin multiple vehicles from all three Ford divisions from the 1970s into the early 2000s. Lincoln-Mercury ended importations of the Capri II in late 1977 (shortly before the introduction of the Ford Capri Mk III), with leftover stock sold as 1978 vehicles. Of the 580,000 vehicles sold, one out of every 10 1978 Mercurys were Cougars.

For 1979, Ford Motor Company released its downsized full-size model lines. As American brands had shifted away from muscle cars at the beginning of the decade, the fuel crises of 1973 and 1979 had also sparked the decline of the landyacht. Introduced two years after the redesign of the General Motors B-body and C-body lines, Ford introduced the all-new Panther platform for a smaller Marquis/Grand Marquis. Though smaller than the Cougar sedan in its exterior footprint (except for width), the 1979 Marquis gained interior space over its 1978 predecessor. The Capri made its return, becoming a Mercury-brand vehicle; instead of a captive import, the model line was now a version of the Ford Mustang hatchback (both adopting the 1978 Fox platform). Bolstered by the redesign of the Marquis and the popularity of Cougar XR7, the Mercury brand reached its all-time sales peak, with nearly 670,000 vehicles sold.

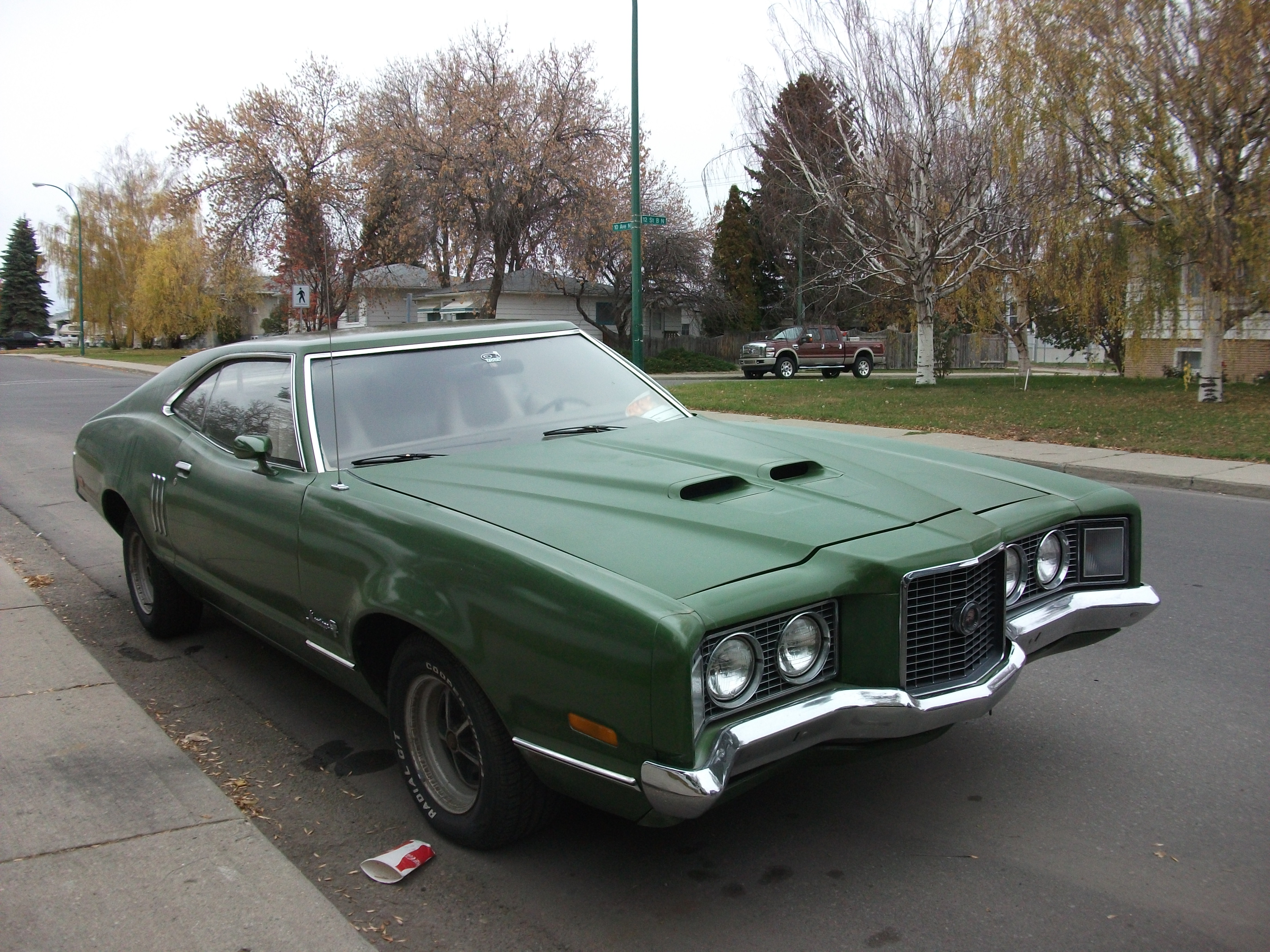
1972 Mercury Montego GT

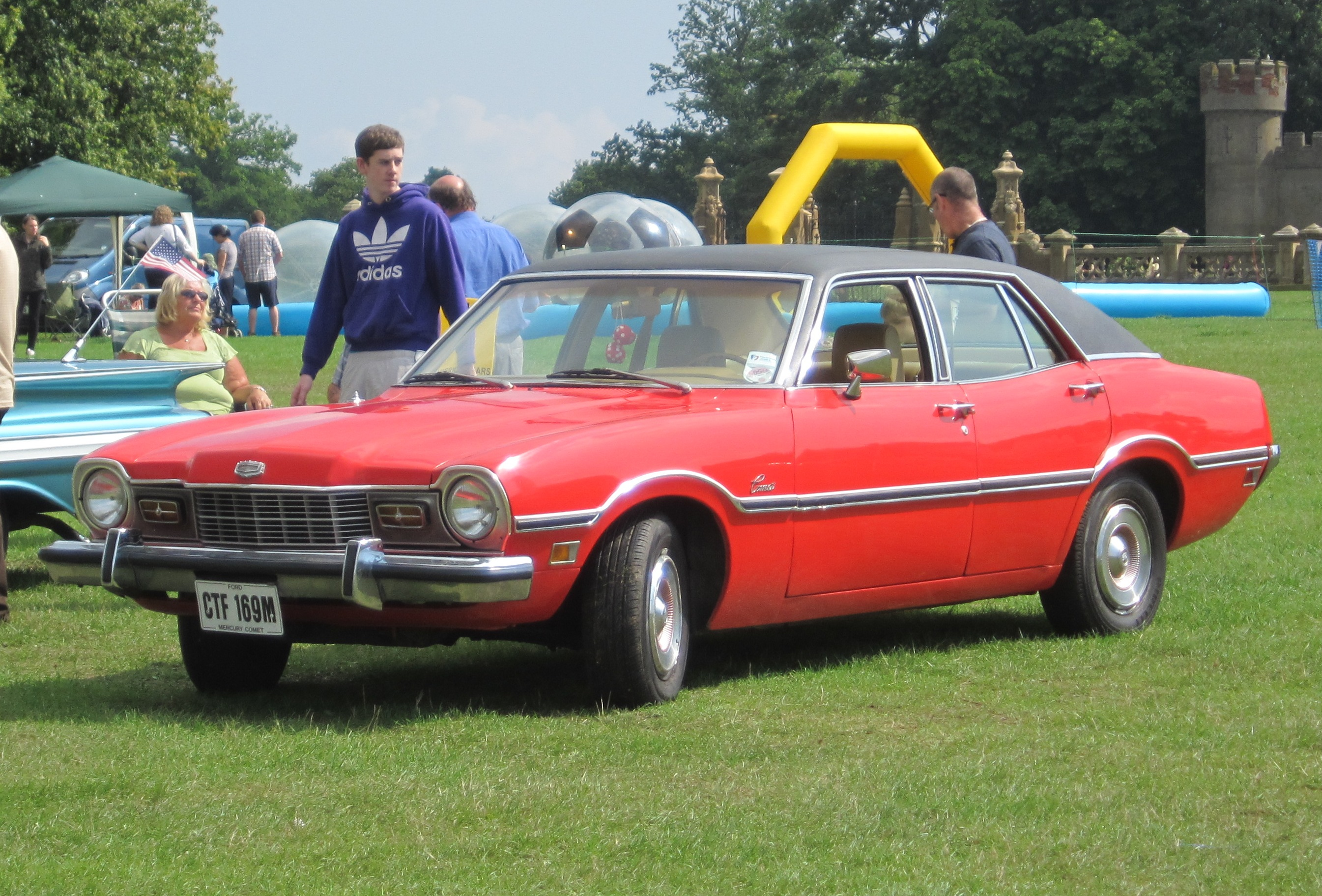
1973 Mercury Comet

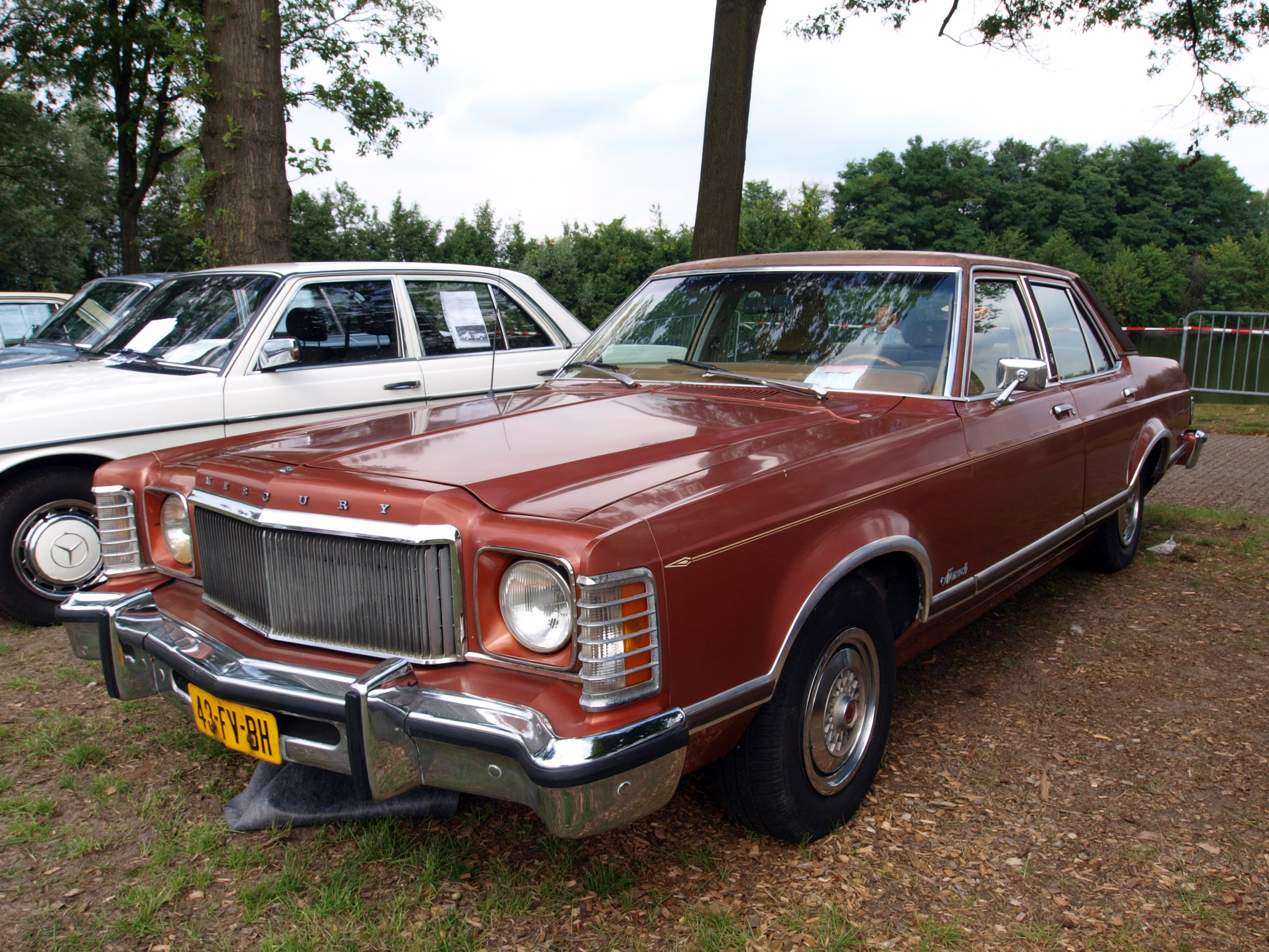
1975 Mercury Grand Monarch Ghia

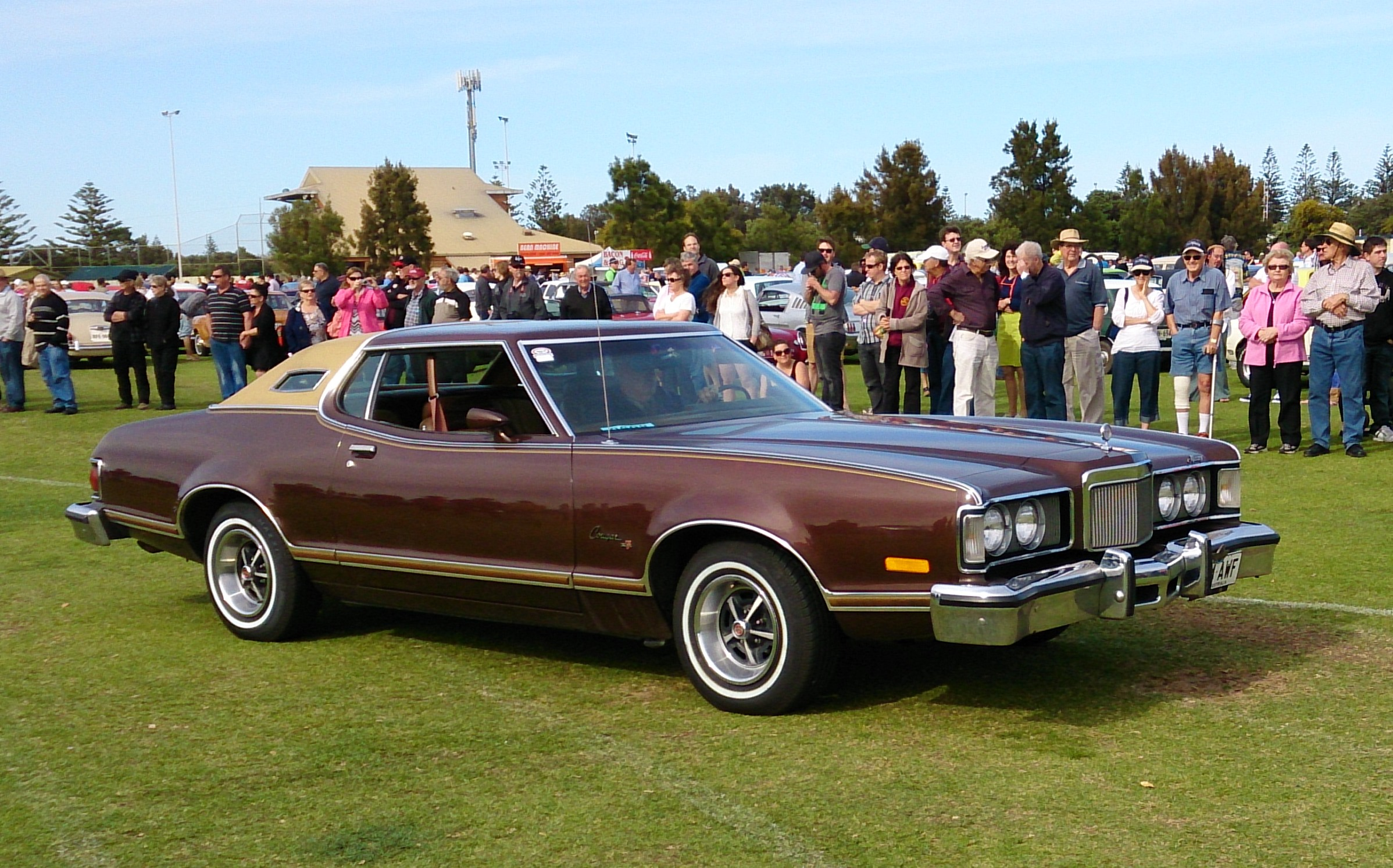
1975–1976 Mercury Cougar XR-7

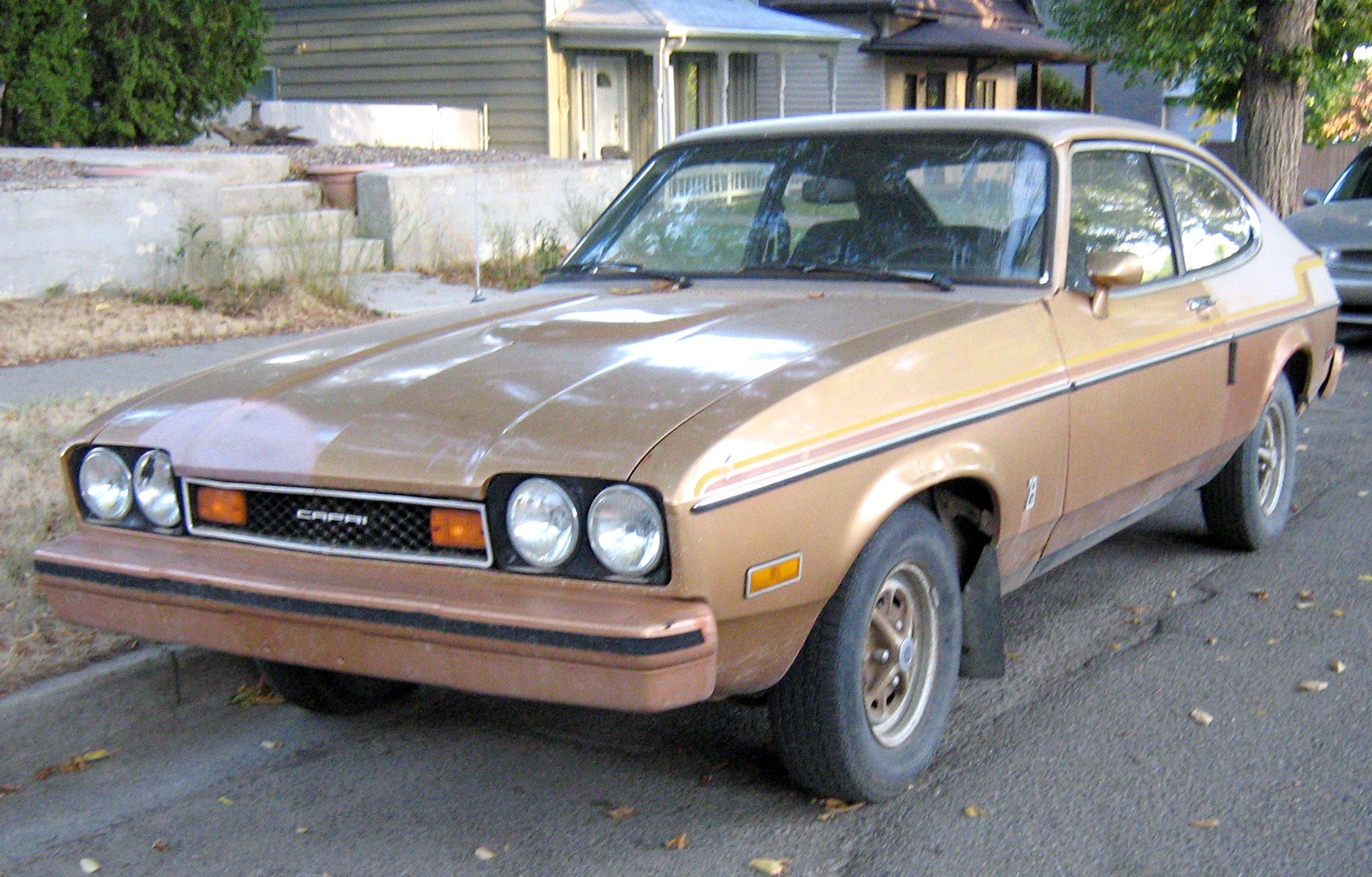
1976–1978 Capri II

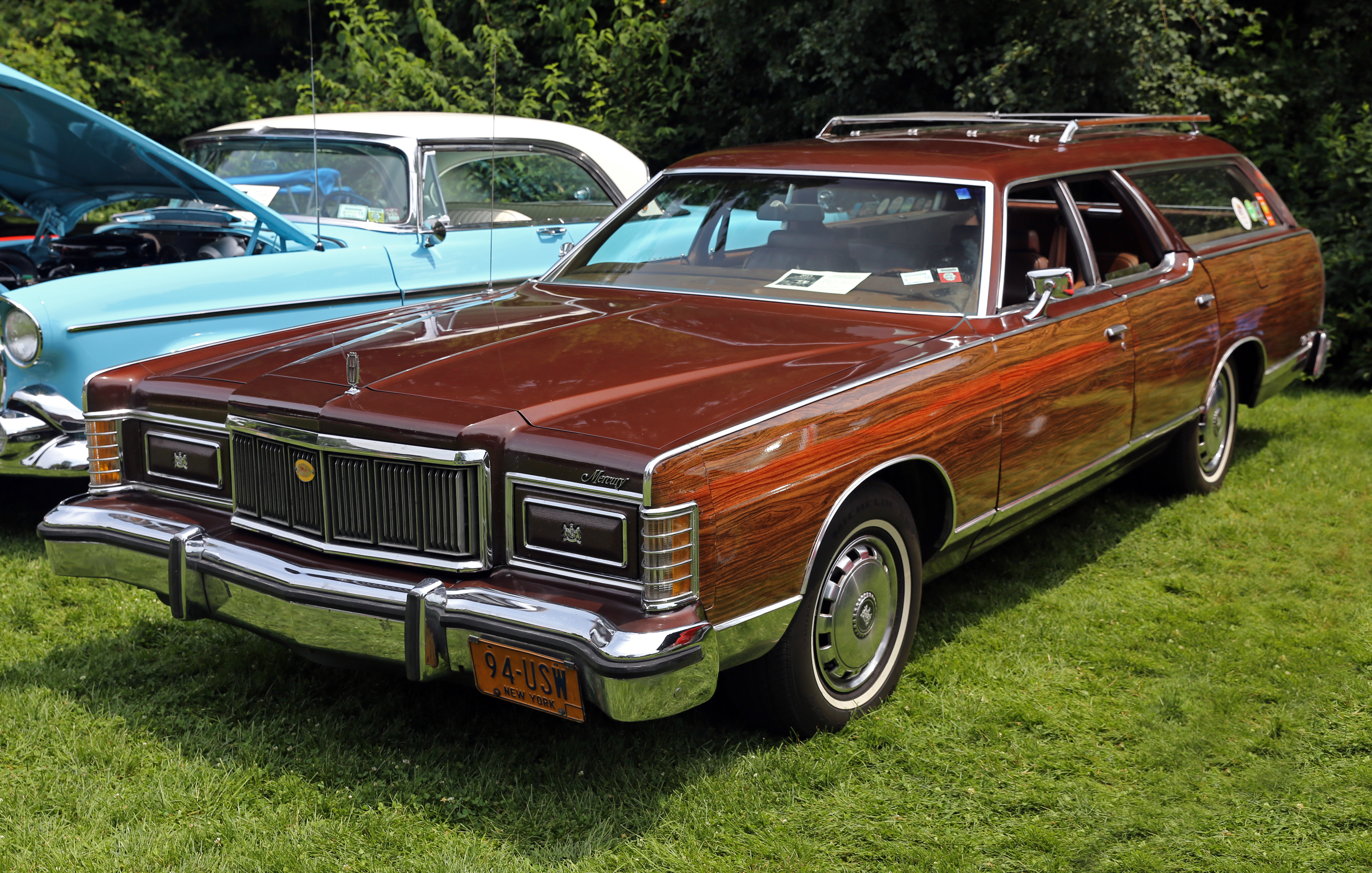
1978 Mercury (Marquis) Colony Park

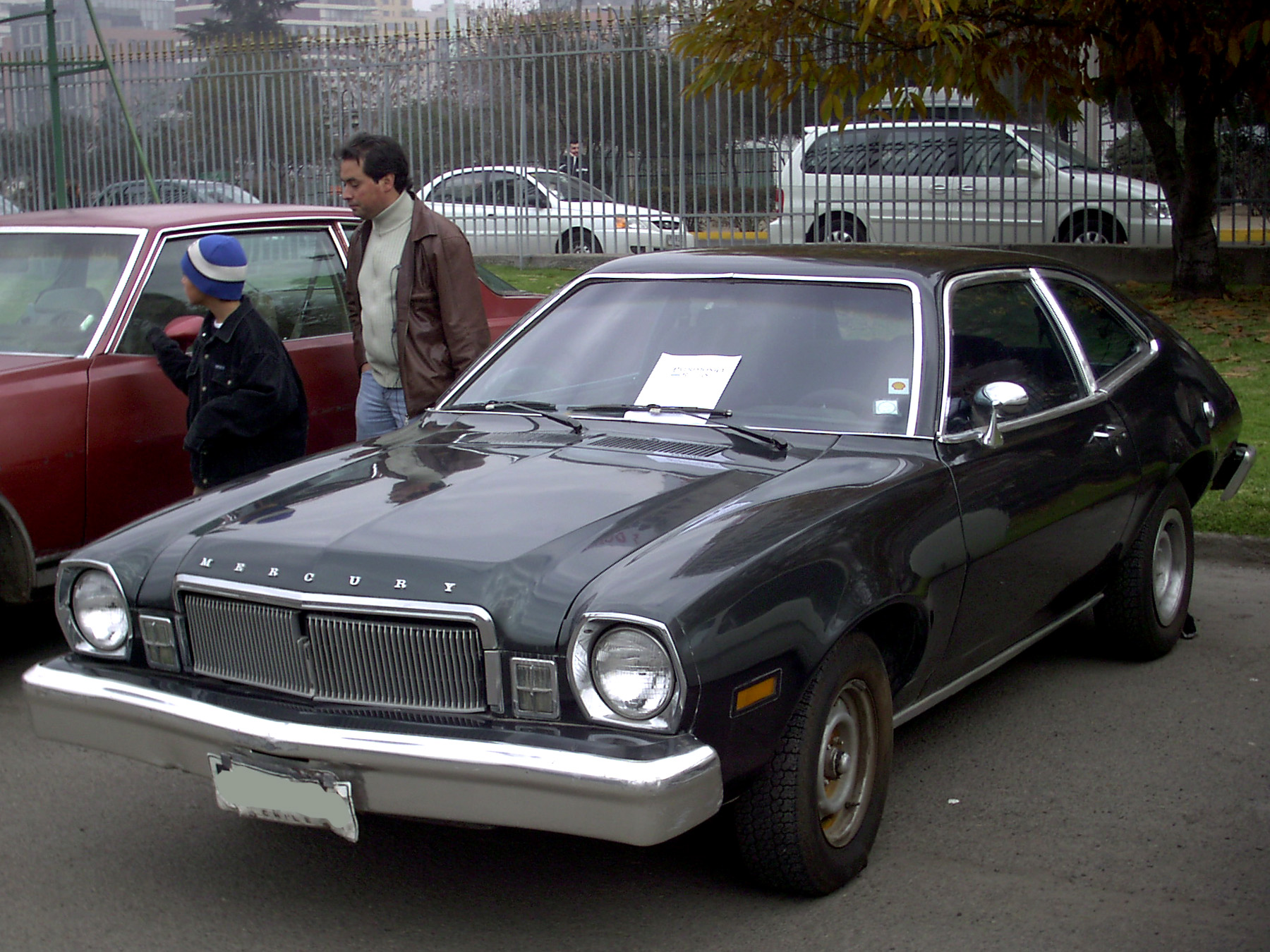
1978 Mercury Bobcat

=== 1980s ===
As Lincoln-Mercury entered the 1980s, Mercury continued the renewal of its model line, redesigning its entire lineup between 1978 and 1982. Since the early 1960s, the continued use of platform sharing had left Ford and Mercury model lines move towards exteriors that held little visible brand differentiation between certain vehicles; some model lines were distinguished primarily by grilles, wheels, badging, and other minor trim. Though the practice maximized production resources, it had largely removed much previous identity held by the nameplate. Through the 1980s, designers sought to change course by reestablishing a brand identity for Mercury while continuing to maximize production resources through platform sharing. Initially associated with full-size sedans and personal luxury cars, Mercury began to diversify its model offerings.

For 1980, Mercury downsized the Cougar, erasing the previous size overlap between it and the Marquis. Pared down to the XR7 coupe, the Cougar was redesigned alongside the Ford Thunderbird as a long-wheelbase version of the Zephyr. Poorly received by critics and buyers, sales of the model line collapsed (to less than one-third of 1979 levels). Struggling to compete against newer competitors, the aging Bobcat and Monarch were both discontinued at the end of the model year.

1981 saw several model changes, largely in response to falling sales. To replace the Monarch, Mercury introduced a Cougar two-door and four-door sedan as its version of the redesigned Ford Granada; the non-XR7 Cougar was largely a Zephyr with a formal roofline and Marquis-influenced fascias. As in 1977, the rebranding nearly doubled Cougar sales (though far below its previous rate). The first front-wheel drive Mercury, the Mercury Lynx was a version of the Ford Escort "world car". Offering the first (and only) diesel engine for a Mercury, the Lynx was produced as a three-door and five-door hatchback and as a five-door station wagon. For the first time, Mercury used its GS and LS trim nomenclature; in various forms, it would be used through the 2011 model year.

In 1982, Mercury introduced the Mercury LN7; the first two-seat Mercury, the LN7 was derived from the Ford EXP. To distinguish the model line, the LN7 was fitted with a compound-curve window for its hatchback. The Zephyr wagon was discontinued, replaced by a Cougar station wagon (last seen in 1977), as Mercury sought to shift the wagon upward in price. In place of the previous 4.2L V8, the Capri RS received the 5.0L V8 of the Mustang GT.

1983 saw a major model revision within Ford and Mercury, involving both full-size and mid-size model lines. The mid-size Fox-platform lines underwent a mid-cycle model revisions (largely to improve exterior aerodynamics), with Cougar sedans and wagons taking on the Marquis nameplate (as the Ford Granada became the LTD); the Grand Marquis became a distinct model line (having become the most popular full-size Mercury since 1979) alongside the Ford LTD Crown Victoria. The Cougar XR7 underwent a complete redesign of the exterior, adopting a far sleeker body than its 1980 predecessor; while the Thunderbird was styled with a fastback roofline, the Cougar received a formal notchback roofline. The Capri underwent a visible change to its rear roofline, as it adopted a compound-curve window for its liftgate (requiring a redesigned rear fascia). Selling far under sales projections (less than 5,000 were sold for 1983), the two-seat LN7 was withdrawn in favor of its Ford counterpart. Buoyed by Cougar sales, Mercury was the fifth-highest selling brand in the United States for 1983 (the highest it would ever finish).

For 1984, Mercury further updated its model range. Replacing the Zephyr, the front-wheel drive Mercury Topaz compact was introduced alongside the Ford Tempo, competing against the GM J-cars introduced for 1982. Sharing chassis underpinnings with the Escort/Lynx (on a longer wheelbase), the Topaz was developed as a sedan. As with the Thunderbird/Cougar, the Tempo/Topaz advanced the use of aerodynamically enhanced exterior design; the 1984 Topaz became the first Lincoln-Mercury vehicle to offer a driver-side airbag (as an option). The new model line also marked the debut of the Mercury "stacked angle" emblem; in various forms, it would be used through the 2011 model year. The change from Zephyr to Topaz proved successful, with all of Mercury selling nearly 500,000 vehicles.

1985 saw few revisions to the Mercury model line, largely in preparation for 1986. For the first time since 1980, the Cougar received a complete redesign of its interior, including an (optional) electronic instrument panel. As a 1985½ model, the Lynx underwent a mid-cycle update, adopting flush headlamps and a black-painted grille (in line with the Topaz). The Marquis (which shared much of its interior with the 1980 Cougar XR-7) underwent minor exterior and badging revisions. Intending to repeat the success of the 1970s Capri, Lincoln-Mercury began sales of the Merkur (see below), a captive import from West Germany aimed at European entry-level luxury cars.

In 1986, Mercury made a substantial change to its mid-size lines, as the Mercury Sable was phased in to replace the Marquis. Along with introducing its first 6-passenger front-wheel drive car, Mercury was replacing its conservative Marquis with one of the most aerodynamic sedans in the world (even sleeker than its Ford Taurus counterpart). Though sharing most of its body with the Taurus (including its doors, roof, hood, and front fenders), the Sable adopted a number of its own visible design elements, with blacked-out C-pillars (for a floating-style roof), vertically slotted taillamps, semi-skirted rear fenders, and the introduction of a low-wattage "lightbar" grille (a design adopted by several Mercury car lines during the late 1980s and early 1990s). Additionally, the Sable served as the design basis of the Taurus/Sable station wagon. To match the Sable, the 1986 Topaz underwent a minor exterior update, receiving composite headlamps and a lightbar grille. The Marquis remained in production through the end of the 1985 calendar year, with Mercury marketing both mid-size lines concurrently.

1987 saw Mercury revise its model lines in a move upmarket. The Cougar underwent an extensive mid-cycle revision (sharing only the doors with the 1986 body); in a break from the Thunderbird Turbo Coupe, the Cougar XR7 was fitted with a standard 5.0L V8 engine. The Capri was discontinued; though more popular than the 1980 XR7, the 1986 model line was outsold nearly 10 to one by the Ford Mustang. The Mercury Tracer was released to replace the Lynx for 1988, becoming the first Mercury assembled outside of North America. The first Mercury since 1960 with no Ford equivalent in North America, the Tracer was derived from the Ford Laser (itself, a variant of the Mazda 323); American production was sourced from Japan and Mexico while Canadian production was imported from Taiwan.

For 1988, Mercury underwent multiple product revisions and updates. For the first time since 1979, the Grand Marquis underwent an externally substantial update (to slightly improve its aerodynamics); the rarely-produced two-door sedan was withdrawn. The Topaz sedan was redesigned, adopting a more "notchback" rear roofline than the Tempo; a grille (initially) replaced the lightbar. The Tracer line was expanded in the United States by the addition of a station wagon.

1989 saw the 50th anniversary of the Mercury division, producing various commemorative editions of the Cougar, Sable, and Grand Marquis. For the third time since 1980, the Cougar underwent a ground-up redesign, with the model line adopting an all-new chassis alongside the Thunderbird (with the notchback roofline returning). Growing significantly in wheelbase (to improve interior room and handling), the Cougar was benchmarked in design against European premium luxury coupes. The Sable saw a minor update (a revision to the bumper and lightbar to aid grille ventilation; the front parking lamps became clear). Far under sales projections, Lincoln-Mercury ended sales of the Merkur brand (see below).

During the 1980s, Mercury had largely succeeded in modernizing its model line and gradually separating its brand identity between Ford and Lincoln. While Mercury was among the last brands to downsize and would have disastrous results downsizing its mid-size model lines (with the 1980–1982 Cougar), Mercury was among the first brands to integrate aerodynamic body design into its model lines and downsized its compact model lines (replacing the Zephyr with the Topaz). In contrast to other American automobile manufacturers, as the 1980s progressed, elements of Mercury design shifted further from divisional (Ford) counterparts. Originally intended for replacement, the Grand Marquis (the most profitable model line) saw little change in contrast to its smaller counterparts.

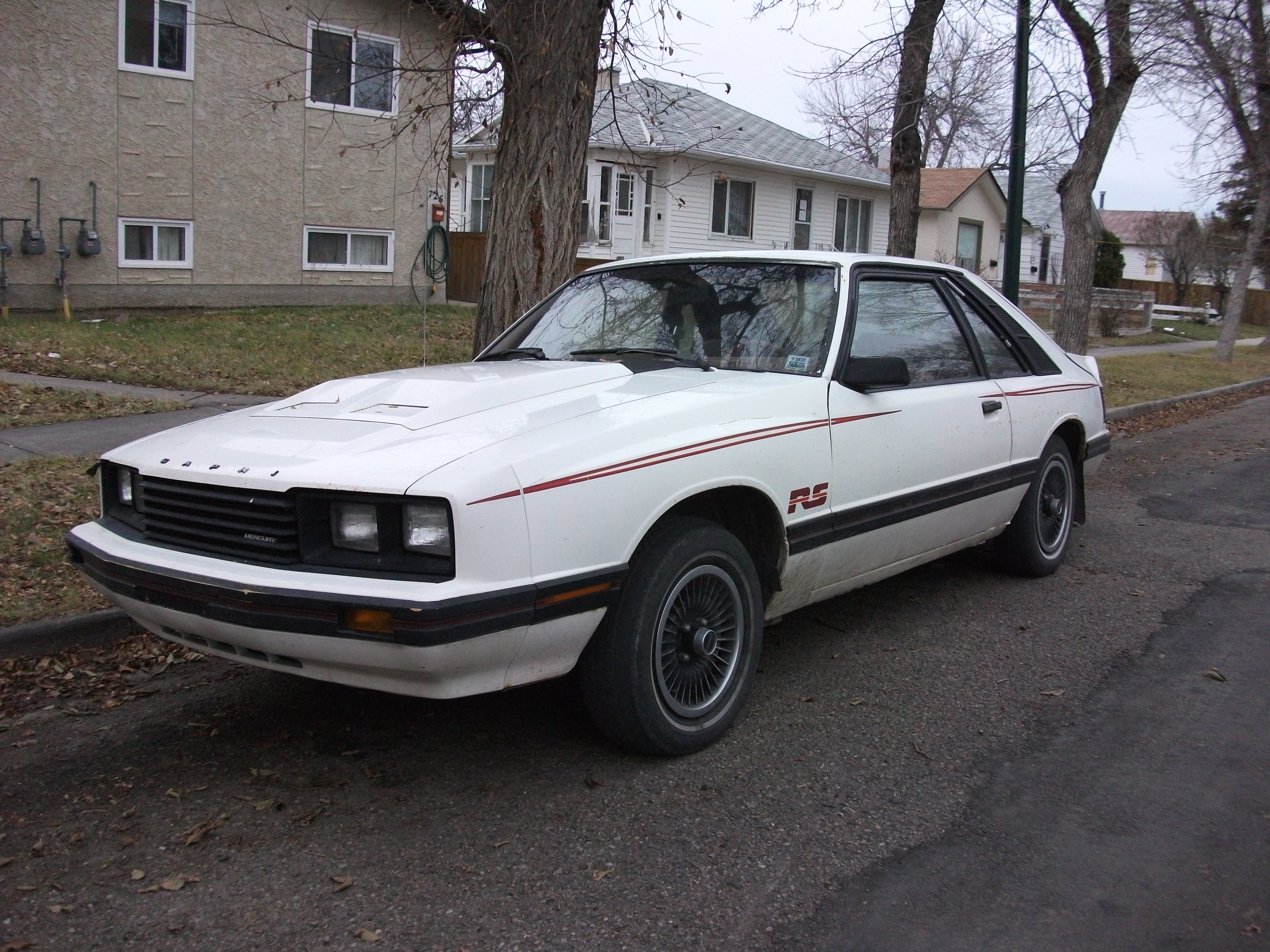
1979–1982 Mercury Capri

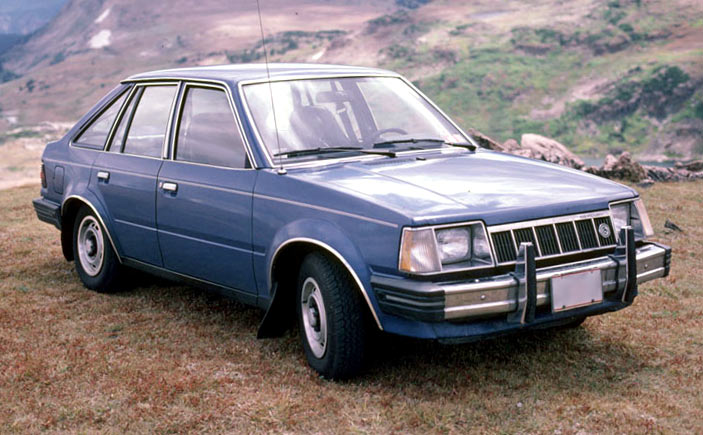
1982 Mercury Lynx

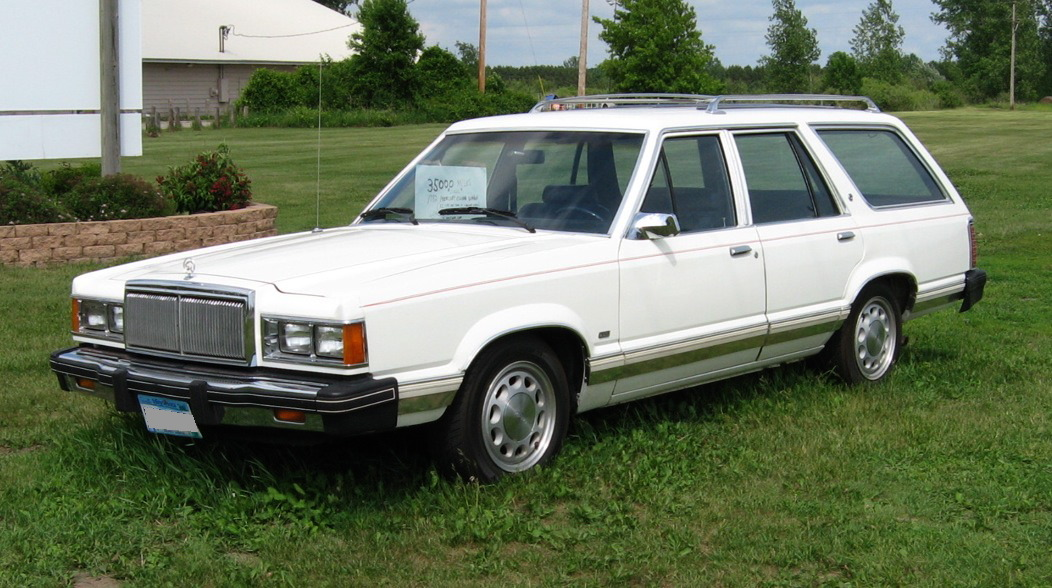
1982 Mercury Cougar GS

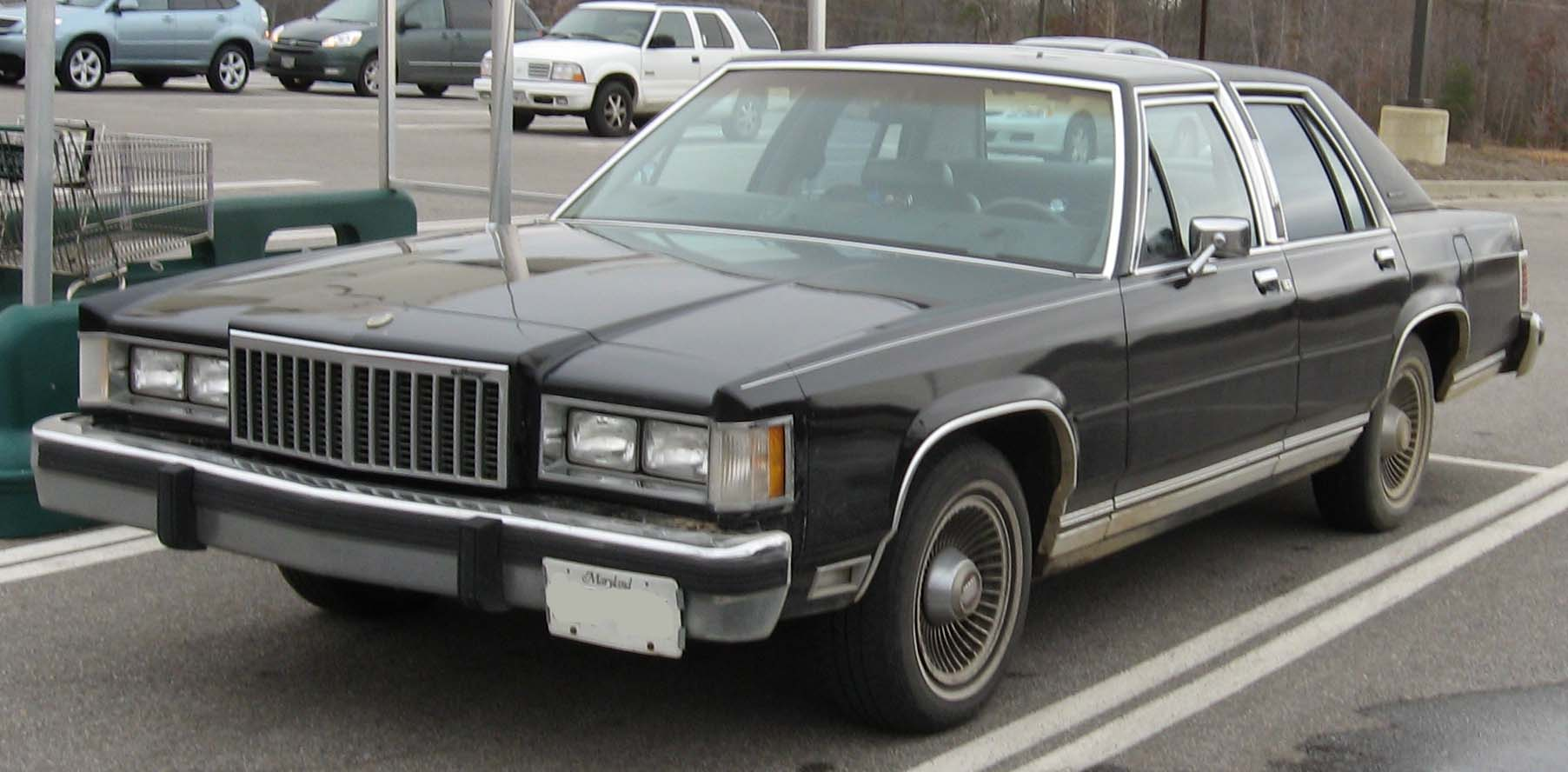
1983–1987 Mercury Grand Marquis

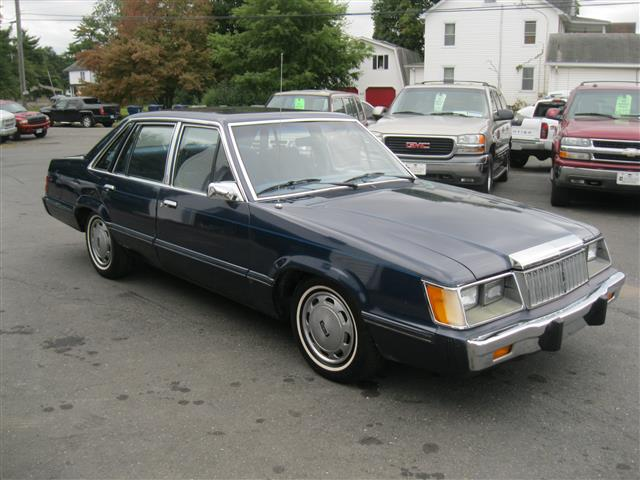
1985 Mercury Marquis

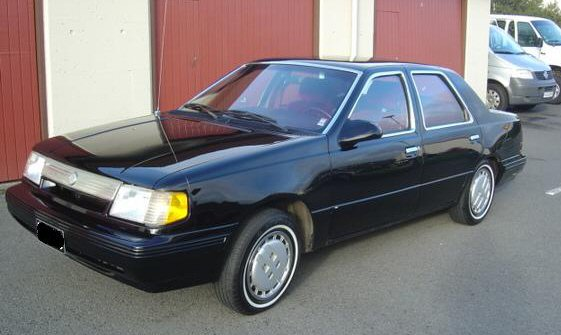
1987 Mercury Topaz

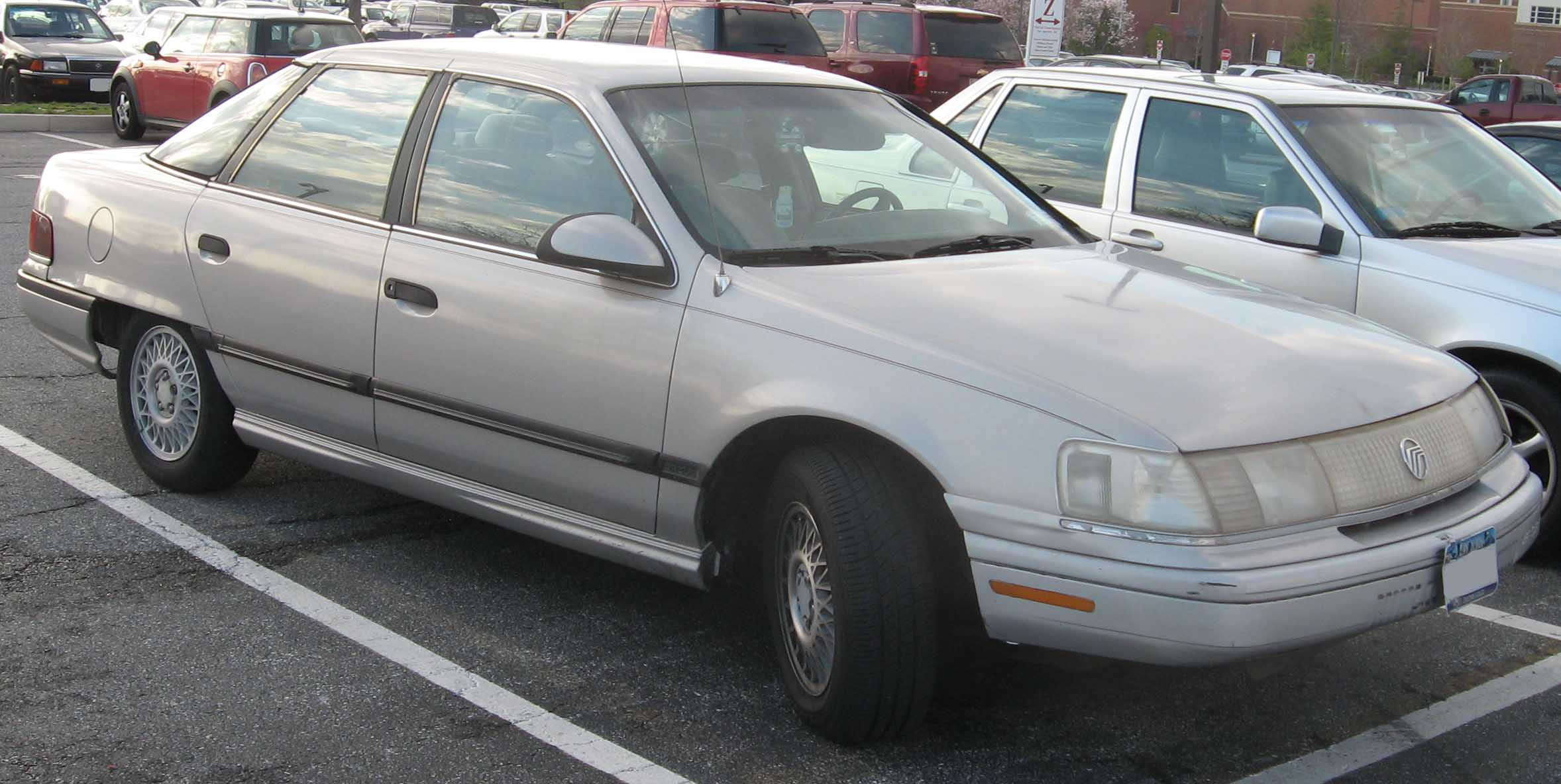
1989 Mercury Sable

==== Merkur ====
For the 1985 model year, Ford chose to revisit the success of the 1970s Mercury Capri, with participating Lincoln-Mercury dealers launching the Merkur brand. Drawing its name from the German word for Mercury, Merkur sold German-produced captive imports designed by Ford of Europe, competing against European executive cars sold in North America from Audi, BMW, Mercedes-Benz, Saab, and Volvo (along with the launch of Acura).

The initial Merkur product line included the Merkur XR4Ti sports coupe, a federalized version of the Ford Sierra XR4i (renamed by Ford in deference the GMC Sierra pickup truck). For the 1988 model year, the brand doubled its product range with the introduction of the Merkur Scorpio, sharing nearly its entire specification with the Ford Scorpio flagship sedan of Ford of Europe.

Following the 1989 model year, Ford discontinued the Merkur brand. In addition to the combined model line falling far under sales projections, the cancellation resulted from several additional factors. At the time, the German assembly of the vehicles led to unstable pricing of the vehicles (partially due to an unstable exchange rate between the US dollar and the West German mark at the time). As many examples of the Scorpio sold for over US$26,400 at the time (approximately $68,569 in current dollars), despite its close appearance to the Mercury Sable, the Scorpio bore a price closer to the Lincoln Town Car and the Mark VII of the time. In addition, for the 1990 model year, cars sold in the United States were required to meet updated passive safety regulations, requiring the fitment of airbags or motorized seatbelts; neither the XR4Ti nor the Scorpio were designed with such features nor were they due for a redesign by Ford of Europe). At only five years, Merkur remains one of the shortest-lived brands in the modern American automotive industry.

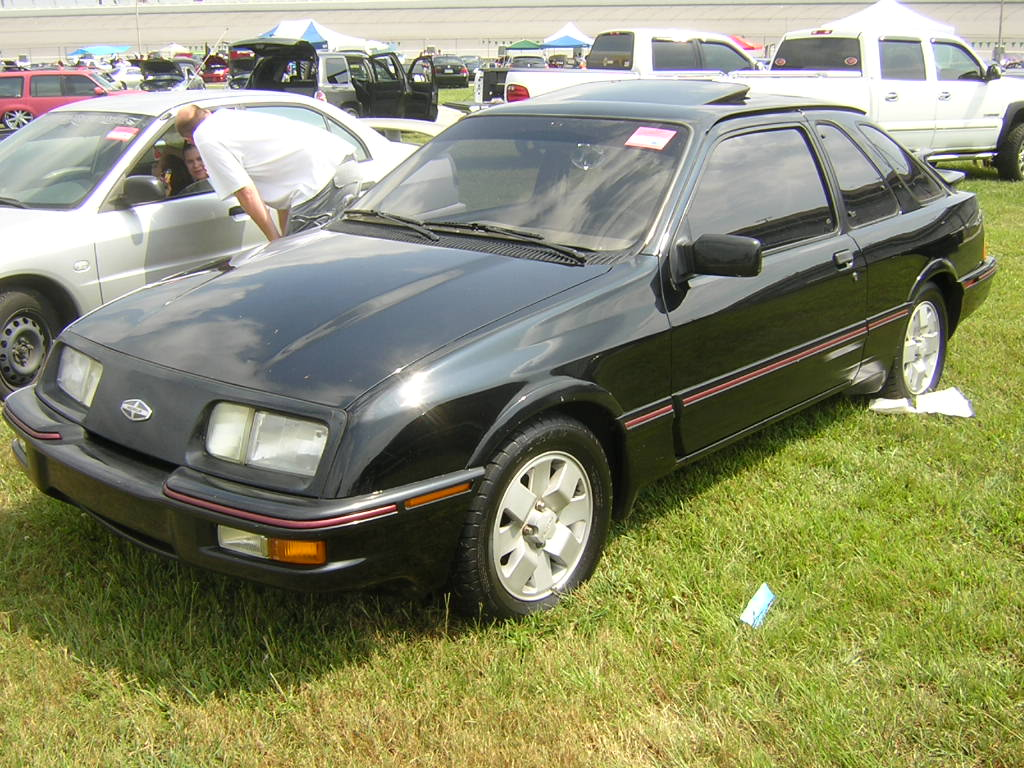
Merkur XR4Ti

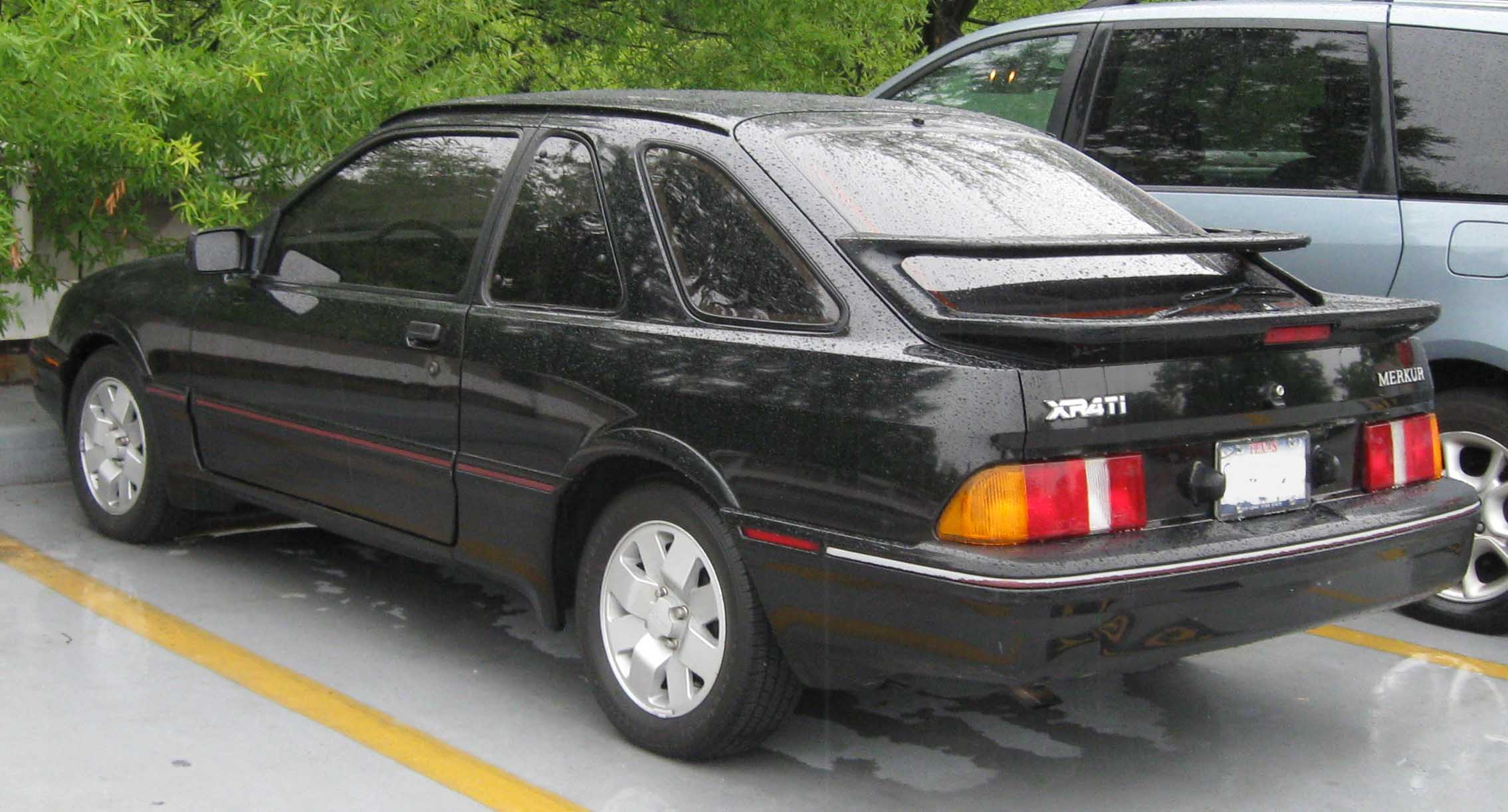
rear view of Merkur XR4Ti, showing biplane spoiler

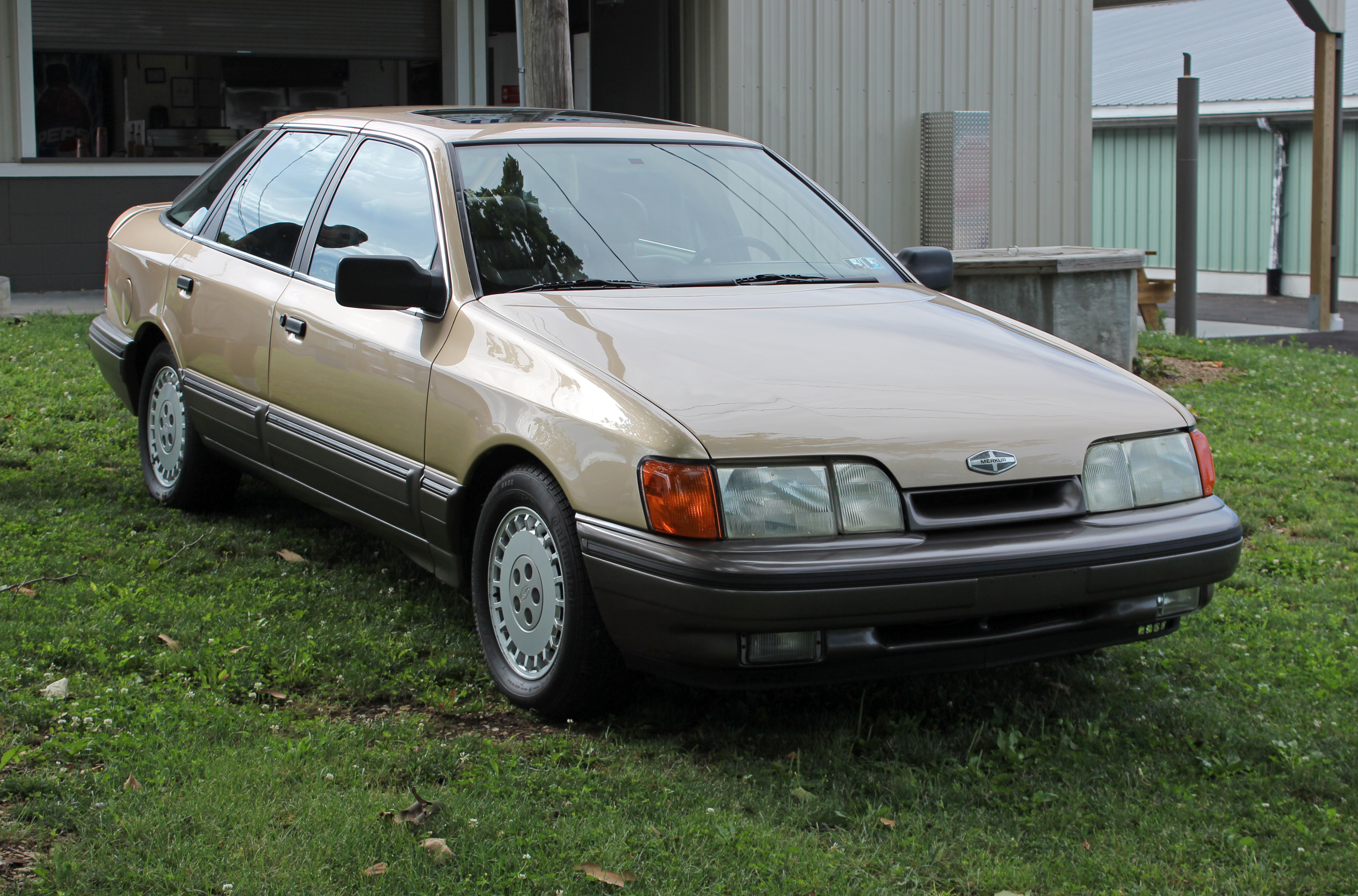
Merkur Scorpio

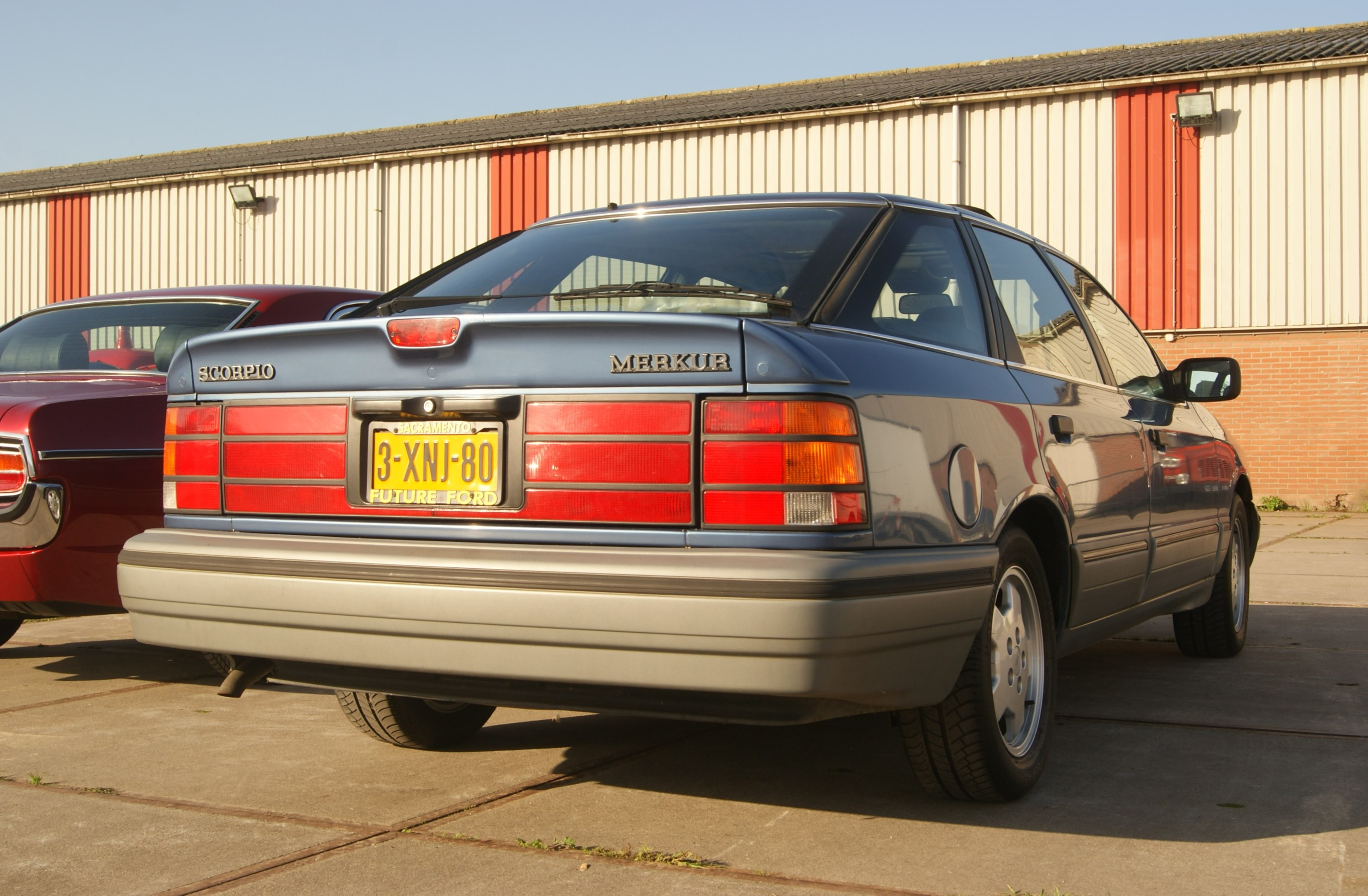
rear view of Merkur Scorpio

=== 1990s ===
Following the closure of the Merkur sub-brand after 1989, the Mercury division itself began its own major transformation during the 1990s. While Ford still intended to keep the division as part of the paired Lincoln-Mercury division, distinguishing its model lines from Ford and Lincoln counterparts became increasingly imperative, along with marketing a model line in touch with consumers. During the decade, Mercury would bring to market redesigns of its best-selling model lines and would diversify its product line, expanding into the minivan and SUV segments.

For 1990, in response to passive-restraint regulations, the Sable and Grand Marquis both adopted standard driver-side airbags (requiring a redesign of the dashboards). The Topaz also offered a driver-side airbag as an option (as it had since 1984).

For 1991, the division strengthened its presence in the compact segment through the return of two previously used model nameplates. For the second time, the Mercury Capri made its return, developed as a competitor for the Mazda MX-5. Assembled by Ford of Australia (which sold a Ford-branded version), the revived Capri was a front-wheel drive four-seat convertible mechanically derived from the Mazda 323 (as was the MX-5, though the Capri and MX-5 were unrelated to each other). After skipping the 1990 model year, the Mercury Tracer made its return. While again based on the Mazda 323, the Tracer also now served as a clone of the Ford Escort (with both model lines now becoming near-twins of the Mazda Protegé). Alongside the body and chassis redesign, the Tracer model range underwent revision, now offered as a four-door sedan and five-door station wagon; the Tracer hatchbacks were discontinued (a body style still offered on the Escort). At the larger end of the size scale, the Mercury Cougar regained its V8 engine (dropping the manual transmission). Fundamentally unchanged since its 1979 downsizing redesign, the Colony Park wood-trim station wagon was discontinued after a short 1991 model year, as large station wagons had lost ground to minivans, full-size vans, and large SUVs.

For 1992, Mercury would undergo another extensive update, releasing new generations of its best-selling model lines. Though retaining much of the style from the successful previous generation (and its chassis), the 1992 Sable actually carried over only the doors, roof, and powertrain from its 1991 predecessor. The 1992 Grand Marquis underwent a larger-scale redesign, sharing no body commonality with the previous generation. While the chassis was carried over, it underwent major handling upgrades; its all-new 4.6L V8 was the first overhead-cam V8 engine used in an American-brand car. Far more aerodynamic than its predecessor, the exterior of the Grand Marquis was styled more conservatively than its Ford Crown Victoria counterpart (with the two model lines only sharing front doors). Better-received in the marketplace than the Chevrolet Caprice and Buick Roadmaster (and the Crown Victoria), sales of the Grand Marquis doubled from 1991 to 1992, leading it to become the best-selling Mercury sedan through much of the 1990s and beyond.

Lincoln-Mercury gained its first minivan for 1993, introducing the Mercury Villager (see below). The first front-wheel drive van marketed by Ford Motor Company, the Villager was slotted between the two sizes of Chrysler minivans. With the exception of the Topaz compact and Cougar coupe, the entire Mercury line was renewed between 1991 and 1992, leading for sales to increase to over 480,000 (their highest level since the 1978 all-time high).

1994 saw the end of two long-running Mercury model lines. The Capri was discontinued for the third and final time; along with declining sales, its Mazda donor platform ended production. The Topaz (the oldest Mercury line) was also retired, remaining in production nearly unchanged since 1988 (1984 for the coupe).

For 1995, the Mercury Mystique was introduced to replace the long-running Topaz sedan (the Topaz coupe was not replaced). A counterpart of the Ford Contour, the Mystique was developed from the Ford Mondeo "world car" introduced in 1992. While the Mondeo was developed as a mid-size car in Europe, in North America, the Contour/Mystique fell closer in size to compact-size sedans, leading to negative receptions for small interior dimensions (in comparison to competitive vehicles). The Grand Marquis underwent a mid-cycle revision; along with minor updates to the exterior, the interior was redesigned.

For 1996, the Sable underwent its second redesign. Though again derived from the Ford Taurus, the Sable grew further apart in design from its counterpart (with the two model lines sharing little more externally besides the front doors). The heavily rounded exterior was poorly received by both critics and buyers, leading for sales of the Sable to fall by one-third from 1996 to 2000.

For 1997, Mercury debuted a new generation of the Tracer. Though using the Mazda-designed chassis of the previous generation, the 1997 Tracer sedan adopted an all-new body. In contrast to the Sable, the Tracer differed from its Ford Escort counterpart only through its grille, wheels, and badging. The Mercury Mountaineer mid-size SUV (see below) was introduced as the first Lincoln-Mercury SUV. Following the GM retirement of the Buick Roadmaster and Chevrolet Caprice, sales of the Grand Marquis increased nearly 20 percent over 1996 (as the model line competed largely against the Ford Crown Victoria, itself supported primarily through sales of fleet vehicles). At the end of the model year, the Cougar coupe was retired (alongside its Ford Thunderbird counterpart) as sales of large two-door coupes continued to decline.

For 1998, the Grand Marquis received a second mid-cycle update, restyled with a larger grille and taillamps. In response to the 1992–1997 Grand Marquis receiving a better marketplace reception over its Crown Victoria counterpart, both model lines adopted the formal roofline design used by the Mercury. The Mountaineer underwent a minor revision to its front grille to further differentiate it from the Ford Explorer.

For 1999, the Mercury line saw multiple major product changes. Discontinued the year before, the Cougar (see below) made its return in a far smaller and sportier form; for the first time since 1976, the Cougar was not produced alongside the Thunderbird (which remained discontinued). A second generation of the Villager was released, growing in size over its predecessor; in contrast to the Ford Windstar, a driver-side sliding door was standard equipment. The Tracer and Mystique were discontinued at the end of the model year (the latter was sold under a short run of 2000 production).

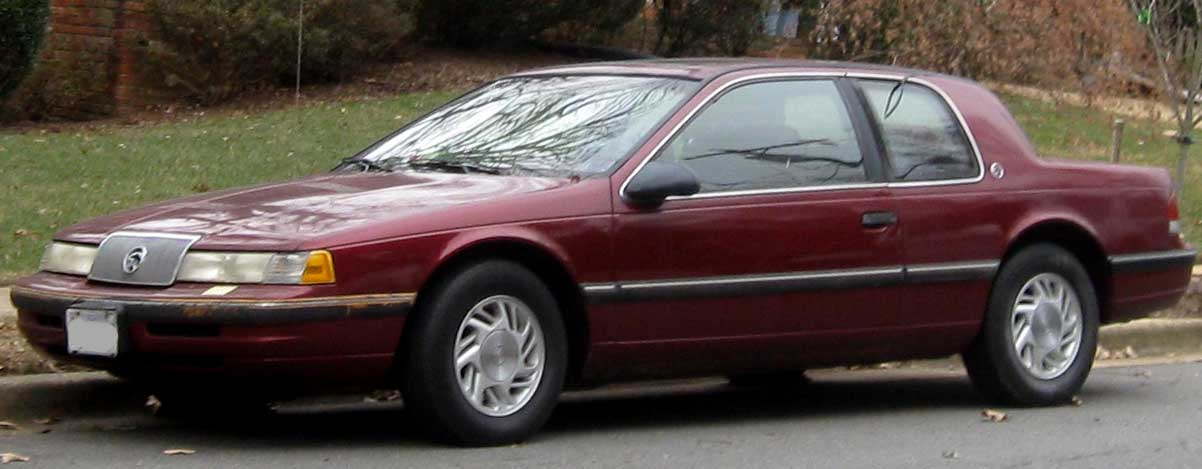
1989–1990 Mercury Cougar XR7

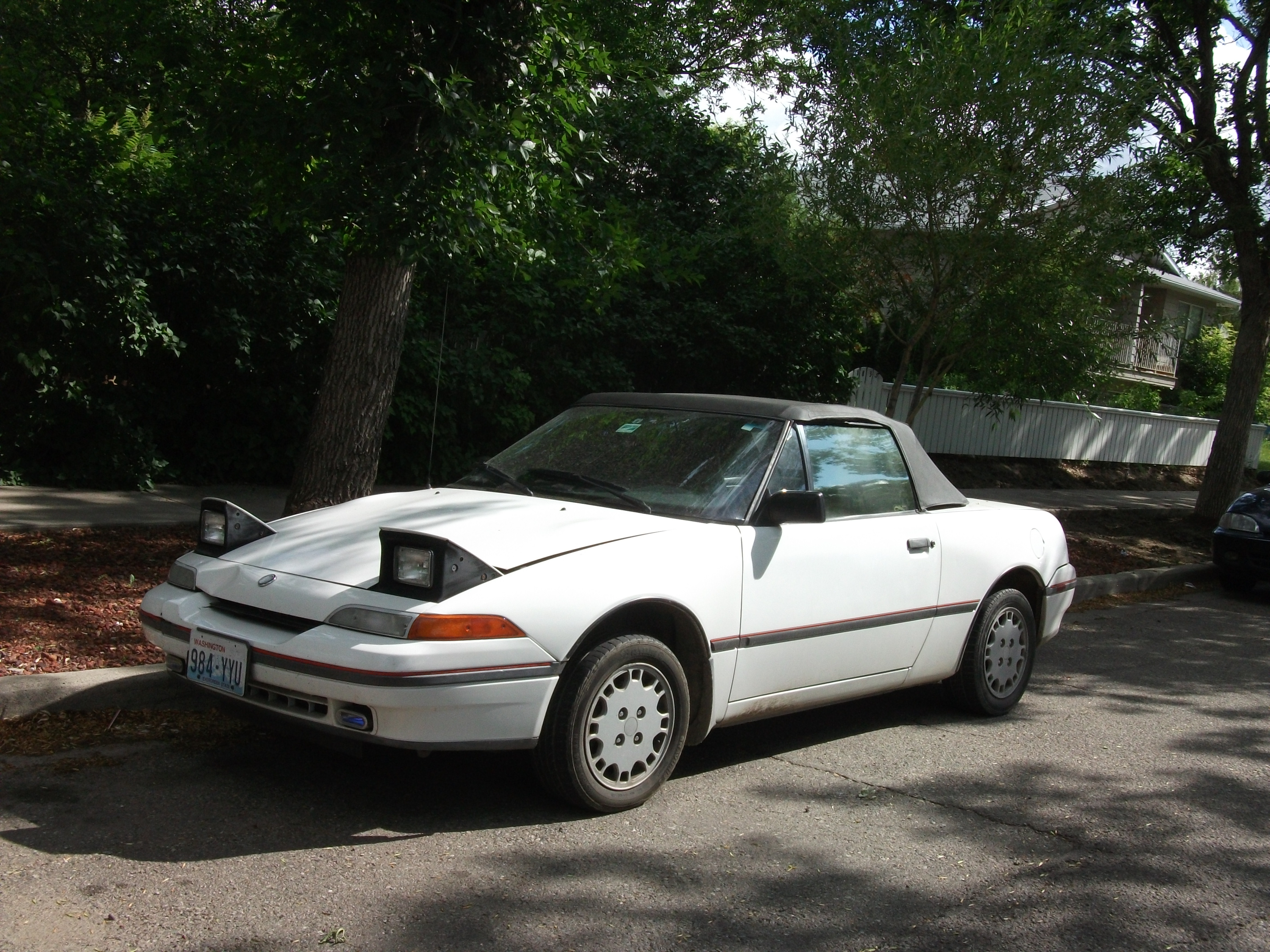
1991–1993 Mercury Capri

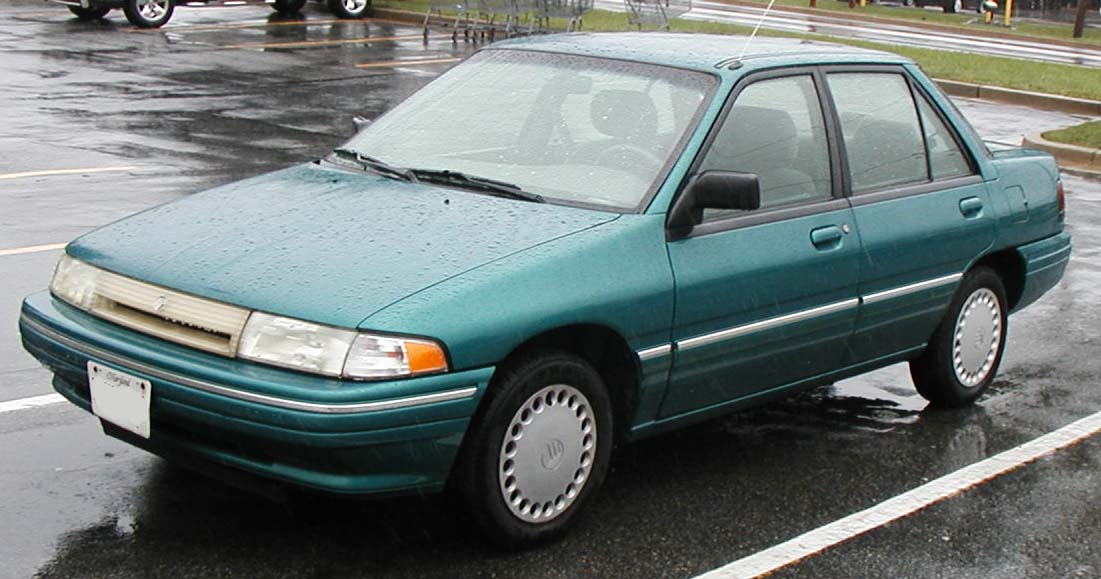
1992–1996 Mercury Tracer

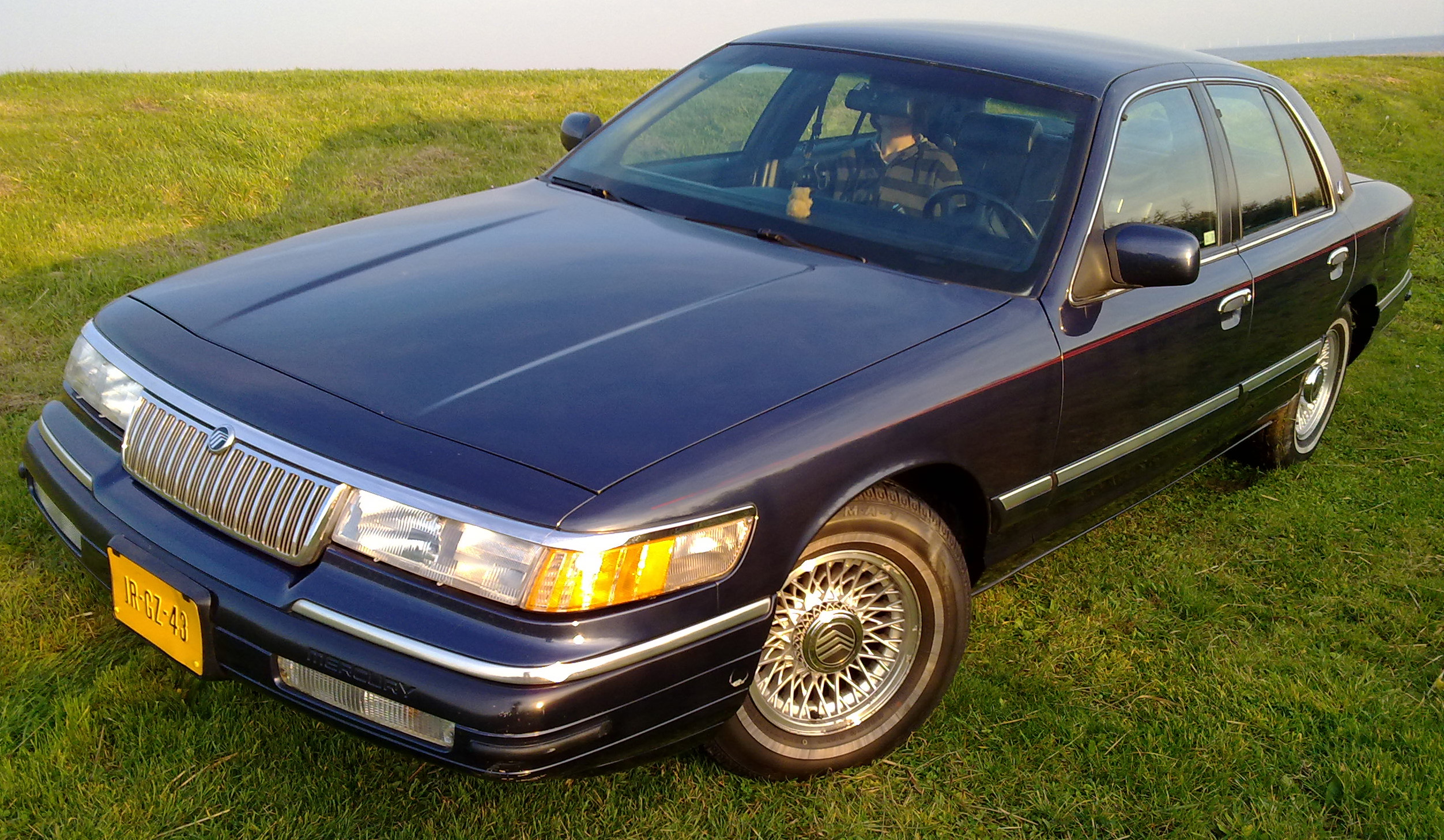
1994 Mercury Grand Marquis LS

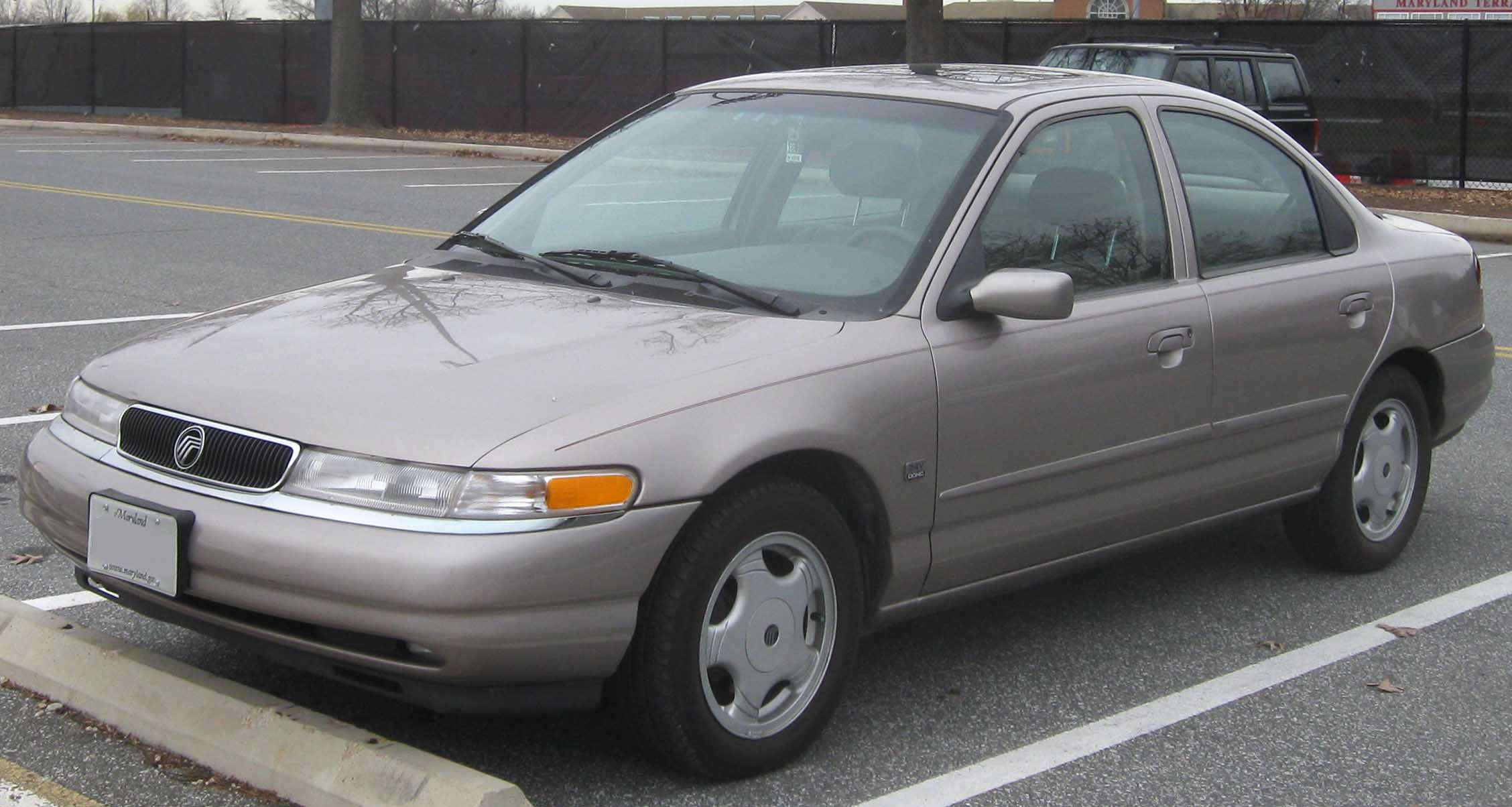
Mercury Mystique

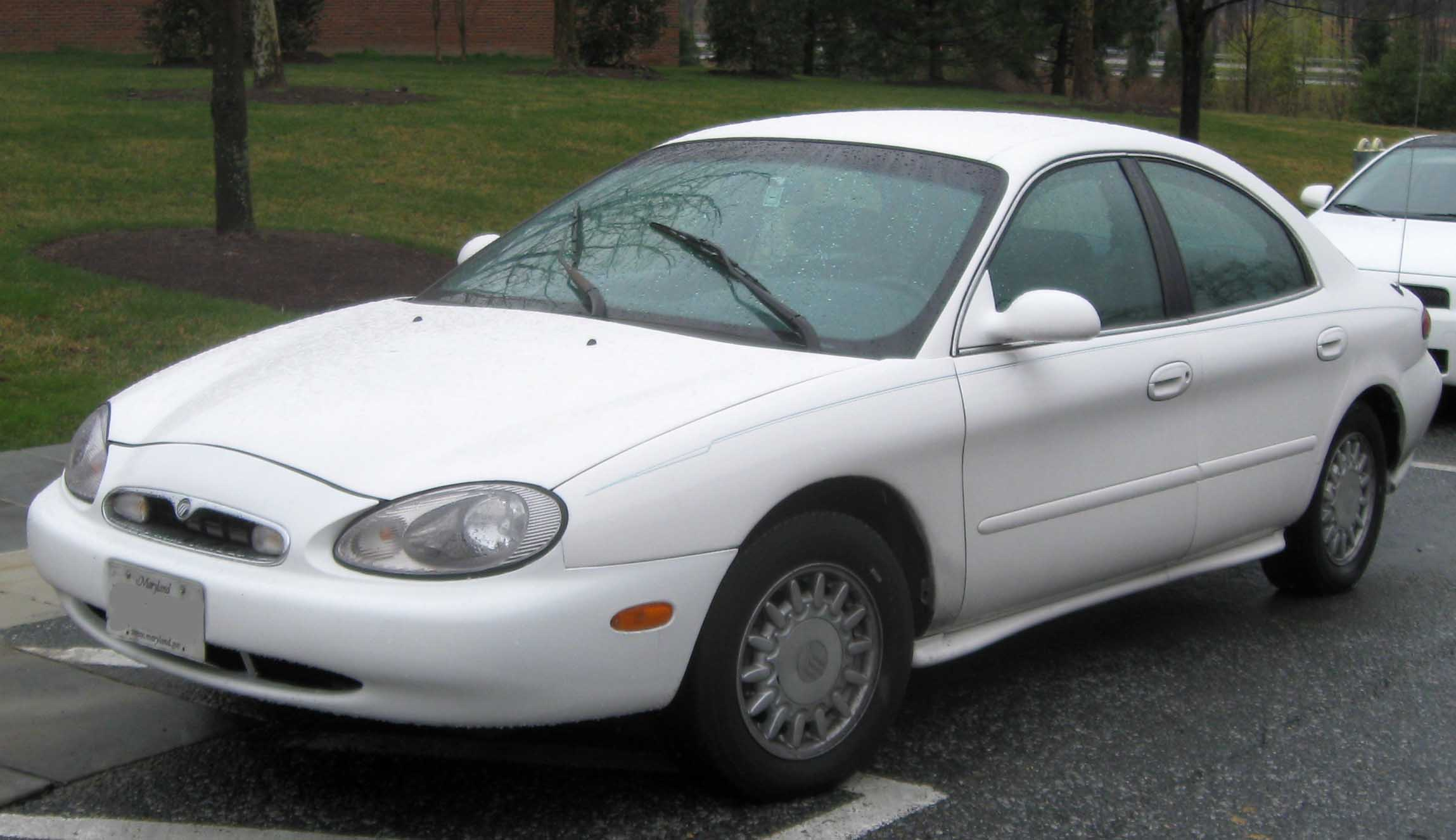
1996–1997 Mercury Sable

==== New market segments ====
For 1993, the Mercury Villager was launched as the first Lincoln-Mercury minivan. Completely different from the Ford Aerostar, the front-wheel drive Villager derived its name used for wood-trim Mercury station wagons. The product of a joint venture with Nissan, the Villager was produced by Ford alongside the Nissan Quest; both model lines derived their chassis and drivetrain from the Nissan Maxima. Sized between the two sizes of Chrysler minivans, the Villager was developed as a competitor for the Chrysler Town & Country and Oldsmobile Silhouette. While more successful than its Nissan counterpart, the Villager would later decline in sales, primarily in response to newer competitors (including the Ford Windstar, Honda Odyssey, and redesigns of Chrysler and GM minivans).

For 1997. Mercury introduced its first SUV with the Mercury Mountaineer. A segment once nearly exclusive to the Jeep Grand Wagoneer, the Mountaineer was developed in response to the Oldsmobile Bravada. Sharing its body and chassis with the Ford Explorer (itself derived from the Ford Ranger at the time), the Mountaineer differed from the Explorer in its use of all-wheel drive (rather than four-wheel drive); a V8 engine was standard (initially). In a styling theme adopted on nearly all succeeding Mercury vehicles, the Mountaineer used a silver "waterfall" grille with a large central Mercury emblem.

After skipping the 1998 model year, the Cougar made its return for 1999 under a completely new identity. After serving as a personal luxury car since 1971, the model line was repackaged as a compact sports coupe (originally developed as the third generation of the Ford Probe). The first generation produced with front-wheel drive, the 1999 Cougar adopted the chassis of the Mystique sedan, bodied as a three-door hatchback. Alongside the loss of the V8 engine, the 1999 Cougar was the first version of the model line offered solely as a Mercury (though badged as a Ford Cougar for export markets).

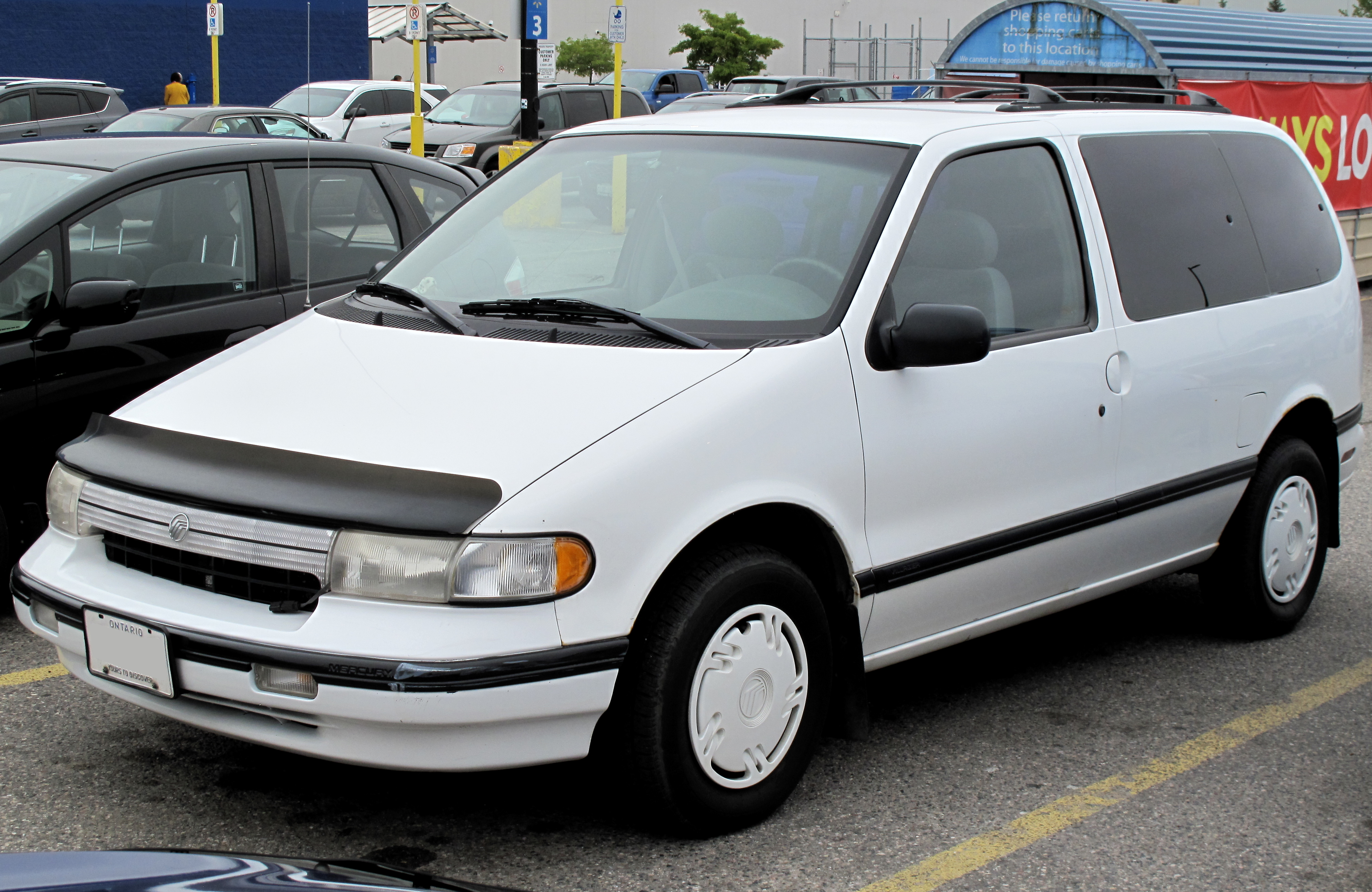
1993 Mercury Villager GS

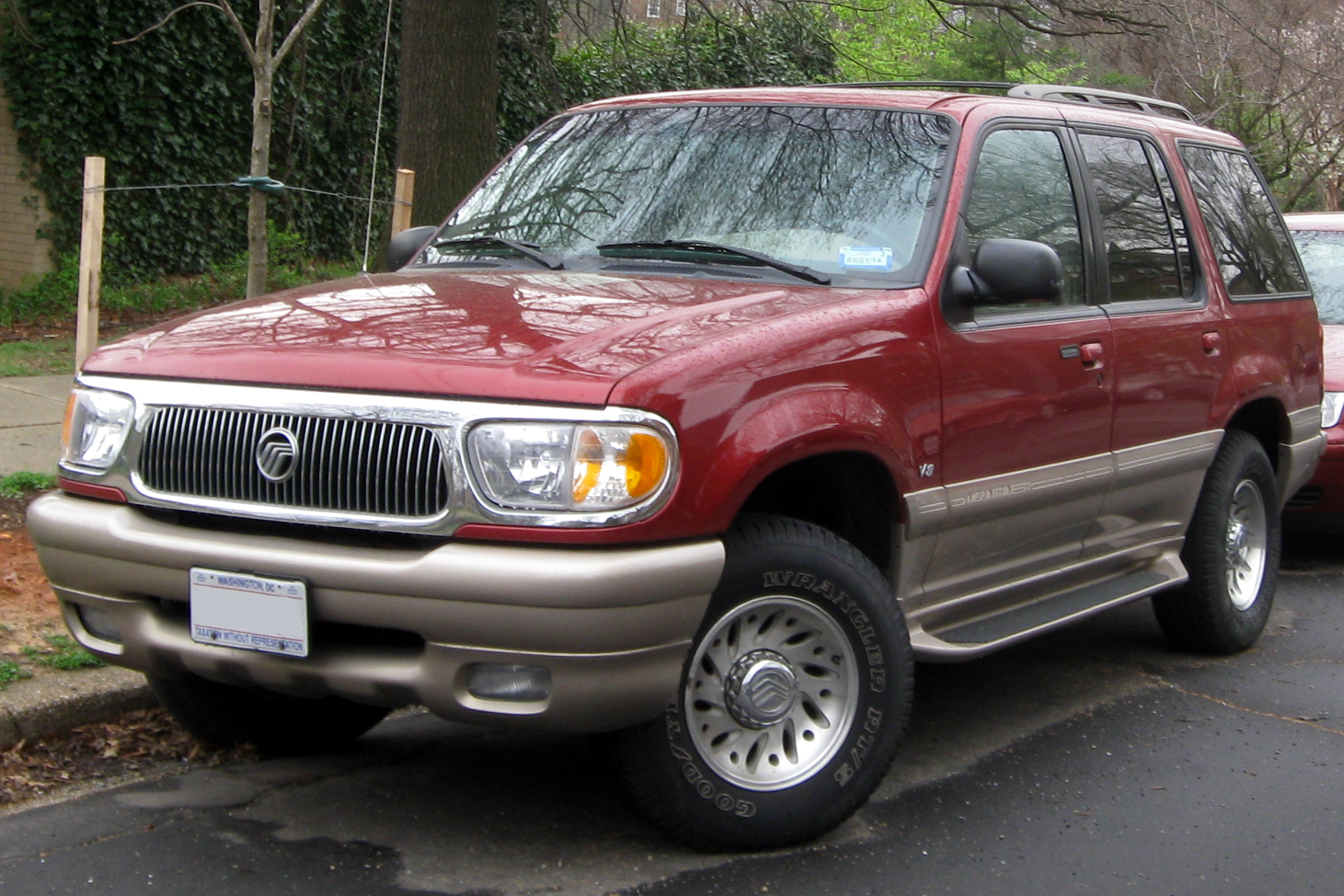
1998-2001 Mercury Mountaineer V8

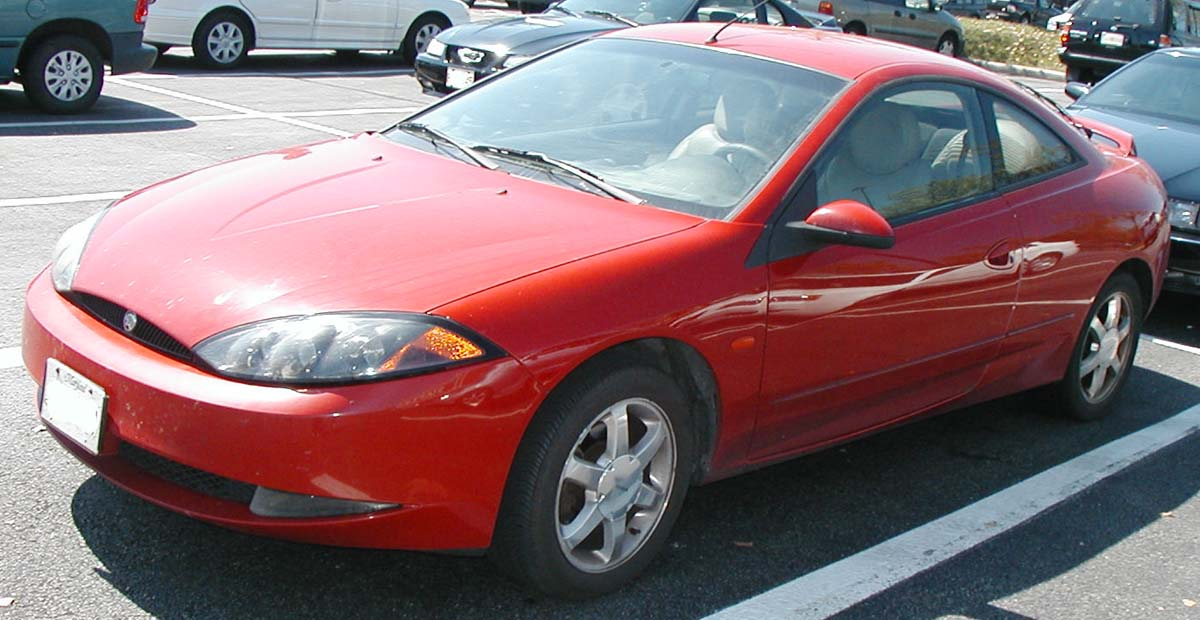
1999 Mercury Cougar

=== 2000–2011 ===
At the turn of the 21st century, Mercury began to struggle in keeping its brand image in touch with premium-brand buyers. At the time, its best-selling model line was the Grand Marquis (trading that distinction back and forth with the Sable since 1992). Though its flagship sedan was among the most profitable vehicles of Ford Motor Company, the average age of its buyer was in their mid-60s – nearly two decades higher than what Lincoln-Mercury sought to attract into its showrooms. At the beginning of the decade, Lincoln-Mercury was made part of Premier Automotive Group (PAG), which combined all Ford Motor Company subsidiary brands (outside the namesake Ford brand) under a single organizational structure.

In another change, Mercury saw its model line begin to change as Ford revised its usage of rebranding model lines as divisional counterparts. The revival of the Cougar as a sports coupe (which began life intended as the 1999 Ford Probe) was sold only as a Mercury, wearing a Ford badge only for export markets. During 2000, the Tracer and Mystique were both discontinued, leaving the Sable as its smallest car; subsequently, no version of the Ford Focus was developed as a Mercury. Alongside the Villager and Mountaineer, Mercury sold only the Cougar, Sable and Grand Marquis. Each vehicle line was marketed to widely different buyers, with no common brand styling between them.

For 2002, Ford removed Lincoln-Mercury from PAG and reinstated it as a distinct Ford division (leaving PAG to concentrate on European Ford brands). The model year brought a complete redesign of the Mountaineer for the first time. Though again a counterpart of the Ford Explorer, the new generation came with substantial functional upgrades. Sharing only its roofline and doors with the Explorer, the 2002 Mountaineer launched a design identity used by Mercury through the end of the 2000s: a rectangular waterfall grille and clear-lens headlamps extending into the hood, with interior chrome and wood largely replaced by silver and satin trim. For the final time, Mercury retired the Cougar and Villager nameplates.

After the loss of the Cougar from the model line, Mercury introduced several models in an effort to expand the Sable, Grand Marquis, and Mountaineer. For 2003, the Mercury Marauder returned (for the first time since 1970). Serving as a high-performance variant of the Grand Marquis, the Marauder was developed of the 1994–1996 Chevrolet Impala SS (as with the Chevrolet, most examples were produced with a monochromatic black exterior). Though the exterior was fitted with a relatively modest facelift, the Grand Marquis underwent its largest model update since 1992, receiving a near-complete redesign of its chassis (to upgrade its road handling and durability).

For 2004, Mercury returned to the minivan segment, replacing the Villager with the Mercury Monterey (shifting the nameplate from its car usage). The first Mercury minivan designed by Ford, the Monterey was a counterpart of the Ford Freestar. Its larger size allowed Mercury to directly challenge the Chrysler Town & Country and Oldsmobile Silhouette (and its Buick Terraza successor).

During the 2005 and 2006 model years, Mercury underwent a near-complete transformation of its model line. For 2005, the Mercury Montego (dormant since 1976) was introduced as the counterpart of the Ford Five Hundred, serving as a second full-size sedan line. While only slightly larger externally than the Sable, its interior was closer in size to the Grand Marquis (though only offered with 5-passenger seating). The Mercury Mariner was introduced as a compact SUV, derived from the Ford Escape and Mazda Tribute. In mid-2005, the Sable was discontinued.

For 2006, the Mercury Milan (the counterpart of the Ford Fusion) was introduced as the smallest Mercury car line, replacing the Sable alongside the Montego. The Milan was sold only as a four-door sedan, leaving Mercury without a station wagon (for the first time since 1940). The third-generation Mountaineer was introduced alongside a redesigned Explorer. Though its exterior design underwent only an evolutionary upgrade, the model line adopted many features from the discontinued Lincoln Aviator. Mercury introduced its first hybrid electric vehicle in an expansion of the Mariner line. With a minor facelift for the Grand Marquis (in what would be its last), Mercury had transitioned into a more consistent design theme across its model line (continuing the design elements introduced with the 2002 Mountaineer).

While Mercury shared several of its newest model lines with Ford, it did not market several significant Ford model lines. Though the model was actually previewed as a Mercury (the Mercury Meta One concept car), the division would not market a version of the Ford Freestyle wagon. Subsequently, Mercury would not market the Ford Edge and Ford Flex under its own brand (with both becoming Lincolns–the Lincoln MKX and MKT, respectively). After 2007, Mercury ended sales of the Monterey as Ford ended minivan production in North America after 21 years. Along with declining sales of minivans as a whole, the Monterey and Freestar had struggled to gain market share against more established vehicles in the segment. Ford ended retail sales of the Crown Victoria (shifting entirely to fleet production), effectively replacing it in retail markets with the Grand Marquis (though the Mercury had outsold the Ford nearly entirely since 1992).

For 2008, Mercury underwent significant revisions to the full-size model line. Along with a more powerful drivetrain, the Montego was updated with greater styling distinction from its Ford counterpart. As the Montego had sold poorly in the marketplace (outsold nearly five-to-one by the Grand Marquis for 2007), the model line moved to the Sable nameplate (as Ford renamed the Five Hundred as the Taurus), as new Ford management insisted on nameplates with greater brand recognition. Following the end of retail sales of the Ford Crown Victoria, the Grand Marquis effectively replaced the model line in dealerships (after overtaking it in sales after its 1992 model redesign). The Milan became the top-selling Mercury model line; for the first time in over three decades, the top-selling Mercury was not the Cougar, Grand Marquis, nor Sable.

In 2009, Ford began to make the final revisions to the Mercury model line, phasing out nameplates at the end of their model cycles. The Sable was retired permanently at the end of the model year, with no counterpart of the 2010 Ford Taurus introduced; along with being outsold by the Taurus by a wide margin, the Sable had become the slowest-selling Mercury model car line. The Mountaineer was the only slower-selling Mercury line, leading to retired a year before the fourth-generation Explorer.

For 2010, Mercury released its final model update, a mid-cycle revision of the Milan. In addition to a substantially revised front fascia (distinguishing it further from the Ford Fusion), a Milan Hybrid became the first (and ultimately, only) Mercury hybrid sedan.

For its final 2011 model year (shortened to calendar 2010), Mercury offered the Grand Marquis, Mariner, and Milan. Regardless of the fate of the brand, 2011 was slated to be the final year of the Grand Marquis (largely unchanged from 2003 and last redesigned for 1992). Along with Ford announcing the closure of its St. Thomas Assembly facility (home to the model line alongside its Ford and Lincoln counterparts), the model would no longer be legal for sale in North America in 2012, as federally-mandated electronic stability control was unable to be integrated in the Ford Panther chassis without a complete redesign.

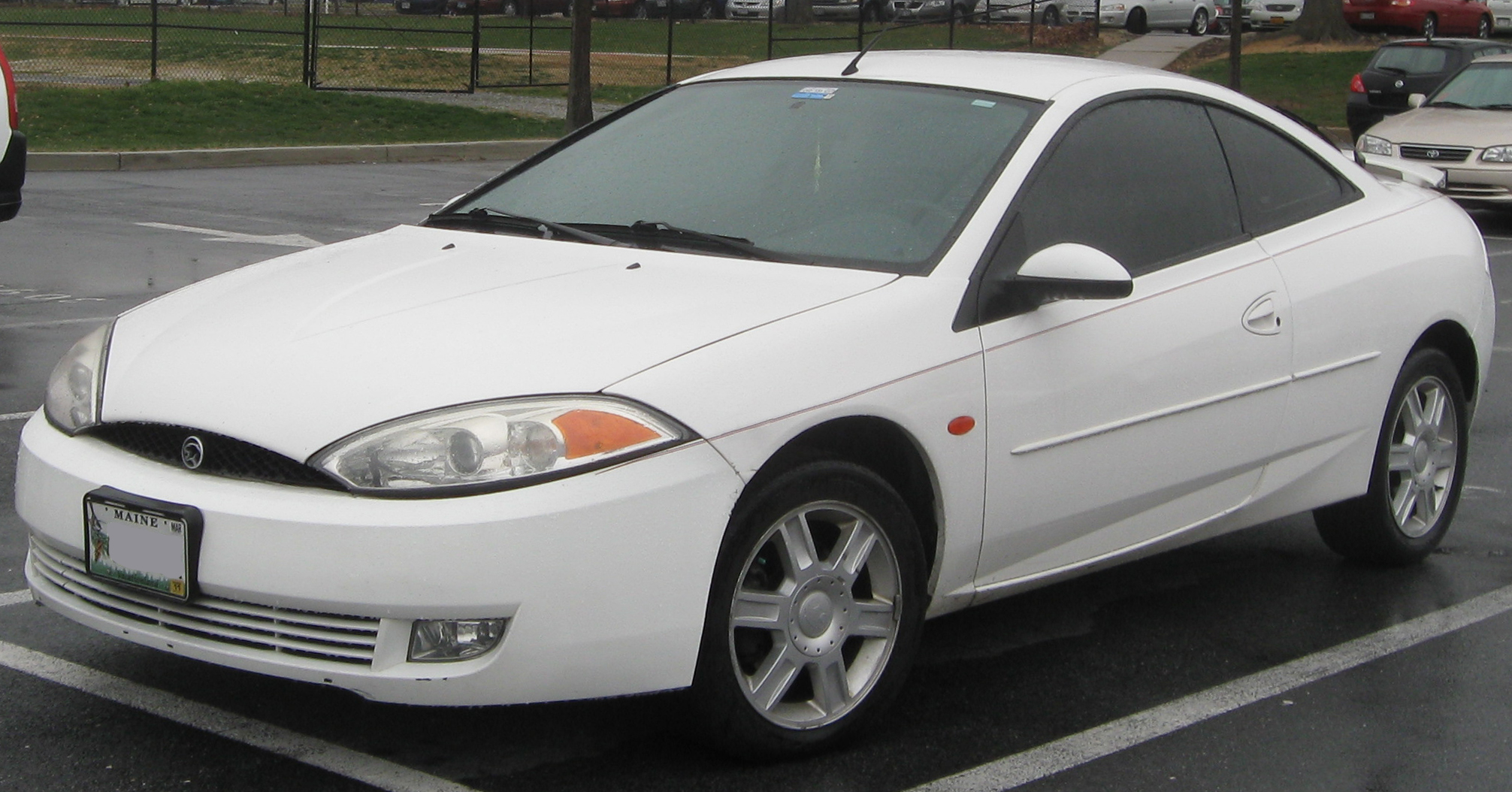
2002 Mercury Cougar

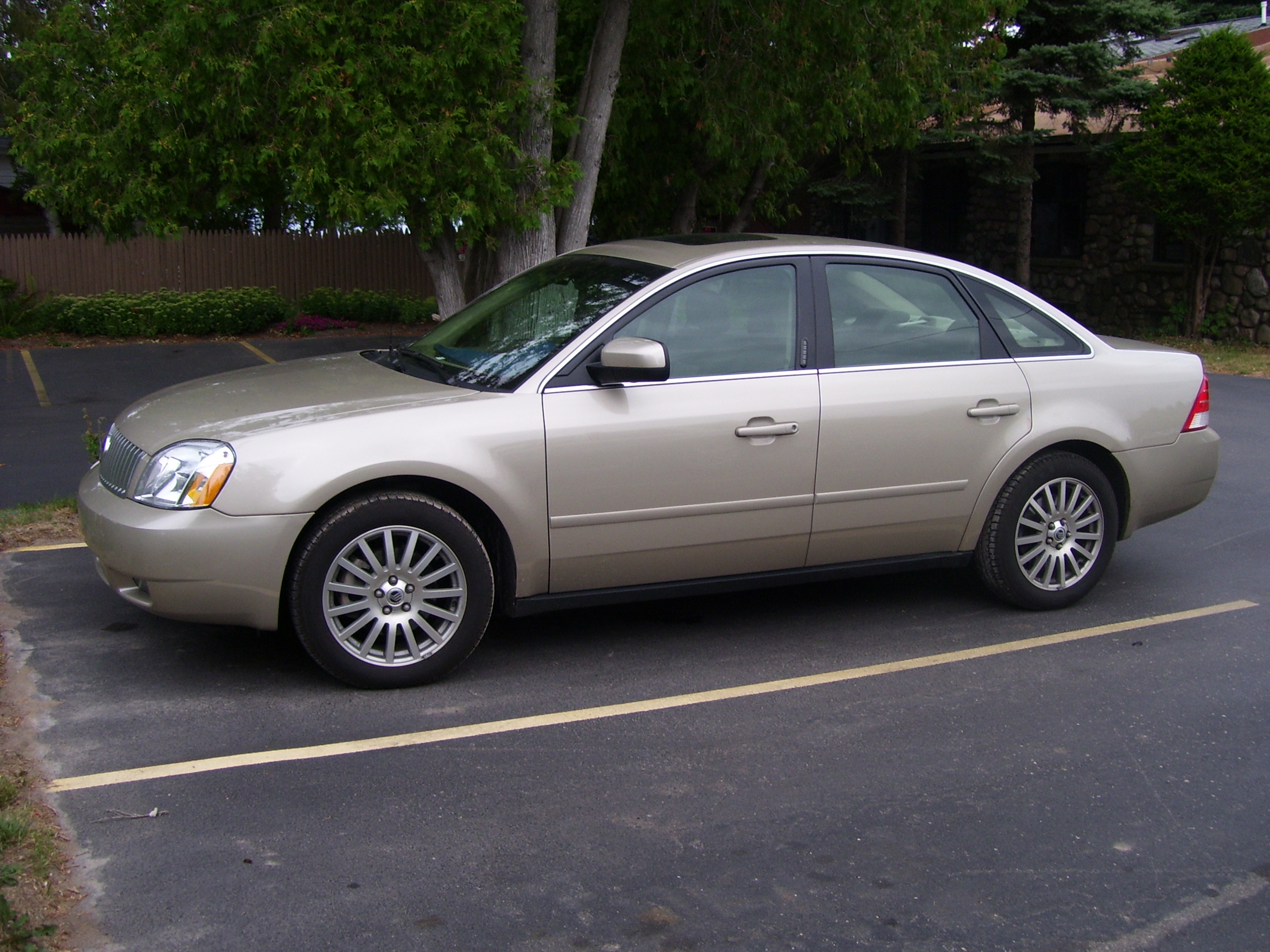
2006 Mercury Montego Premier

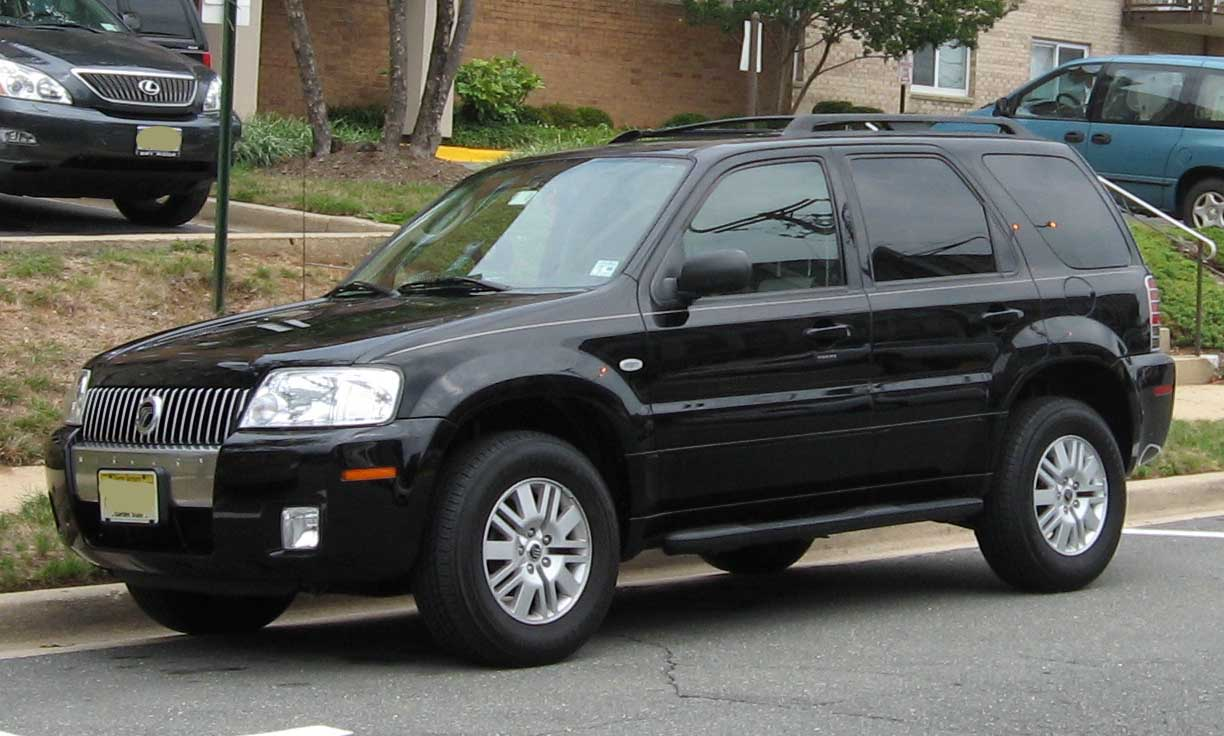
Mercury Mariner

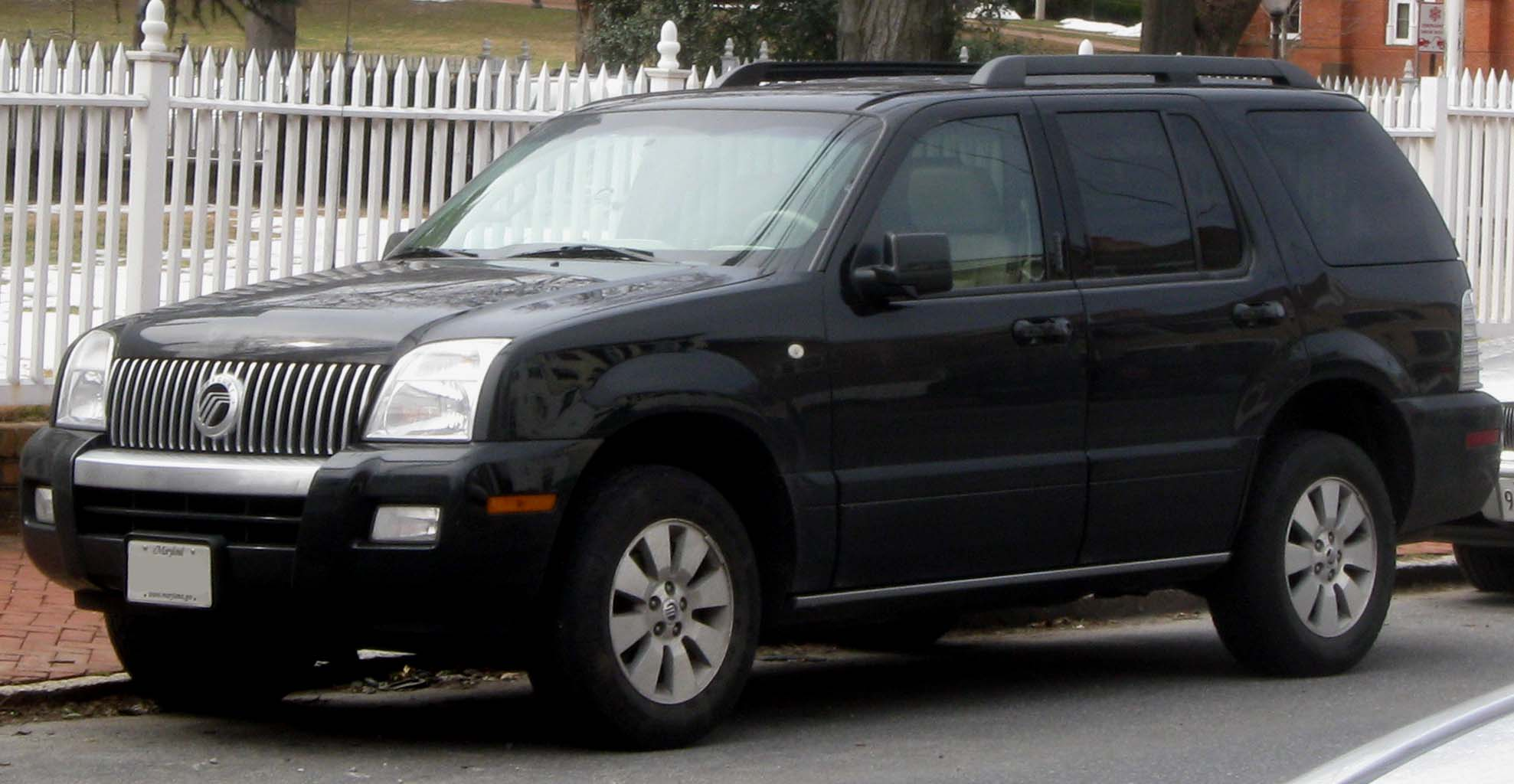
2006-2010 Mercury Mountaineer

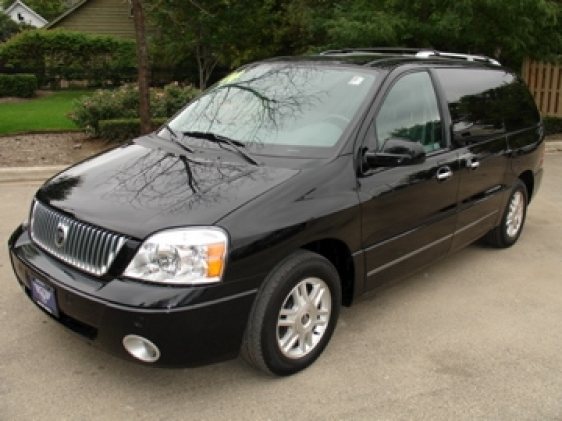
2007 Mercury Monterey

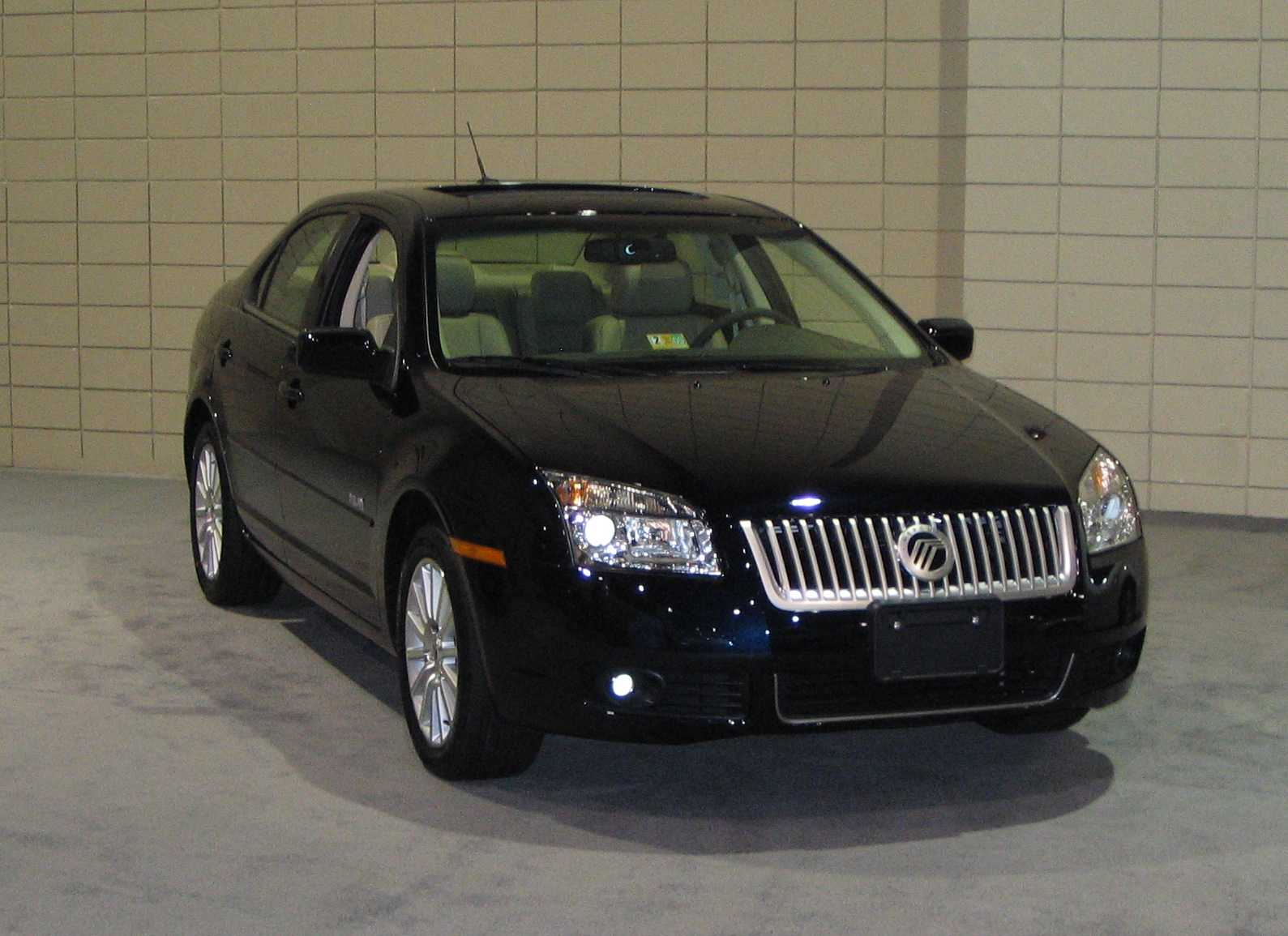
2008 Mercury Milan

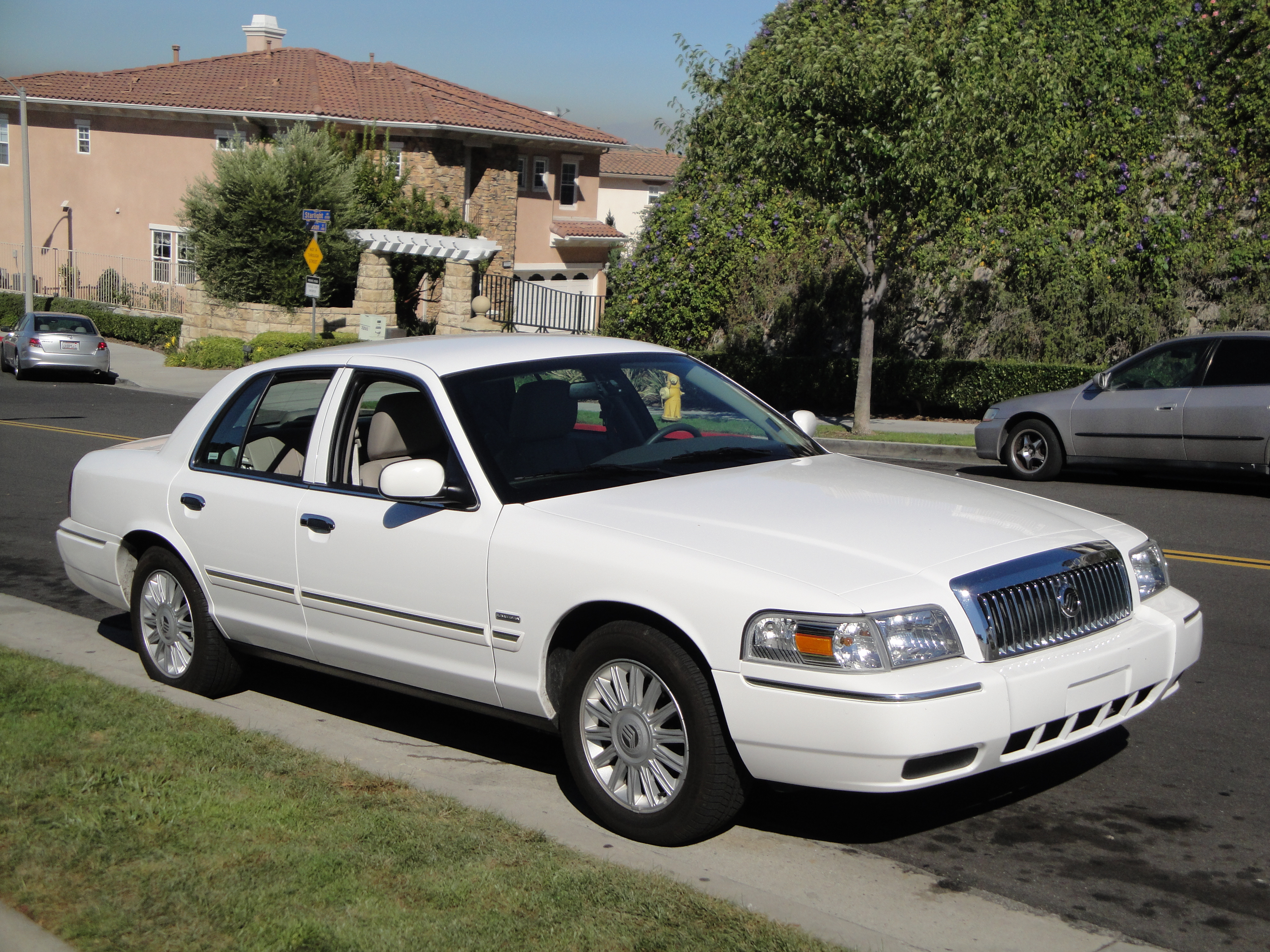
2011 Mercury Grand Marquis

==== Discontinuation ====
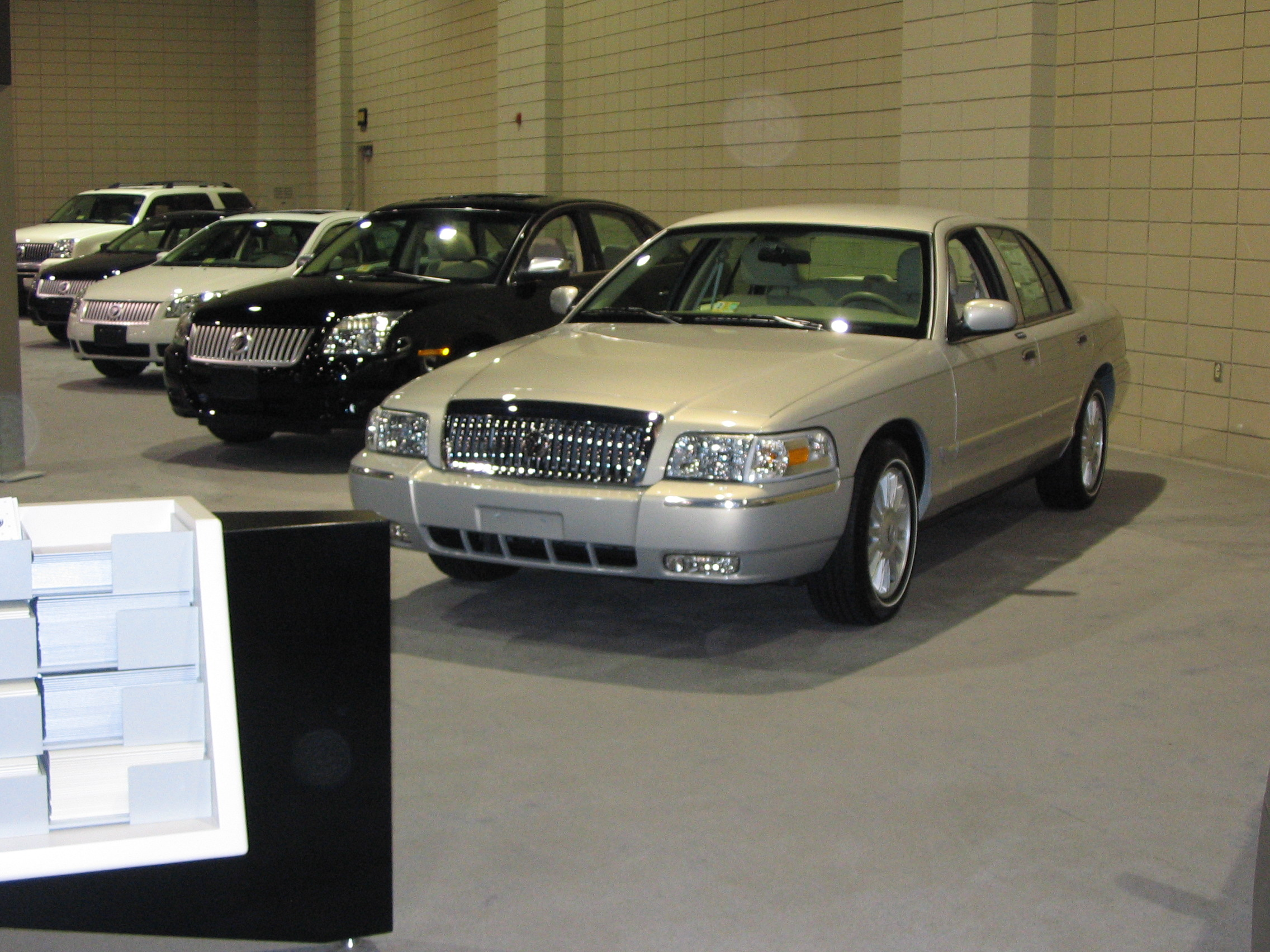
2008–2009 Mercury product lineup

From 2000 to 2006, sales of the Mercury division fell nearly 50%, falling below those of Plymouth in its last two years of existence. In 2008, Ford introduced an advertising campaign starring actress Jill Wagner that focused exclusively on attracting female drivers to the Mercury brand in hopes of making it more relevant and profitable (standing in stark contrast to its late 1960s "The Man's Car" ad slogan). The campaign was a failure, narrowing the brand image and buyer appeal of the division even deeper, and sales continued to fall.

For its two slowest-selling model lines, Mercury retired the Sable and the Mountaineer (after the 2009 and 2010 model years, respectively); the two vehicles completed their model cycles without replacement. The Mariner, Milan, and Grand Marquis were produced through the end of 2010 for a shortened 2011 model year.

On June 2, 2010, Ford announced the closure of the Mercury line effective at the end of 2010, as the company intended to instead concentrate its marketing and engineering efforts on the Ford and Lincoln model lines. In terms of overall sales in North America, the Mercury brand held a 1 percent share (compared to the 16 percent share of Ford). After selling under 93,000 vehicles for 2009, Mercury had sold fewer vehicles than either Oldsmobile or Plymouth prior to their discontinuation; the 2009 figure was lower than both that of the Grand Marquis and Sable for 2001.

At the time, Mercury vehicles were sold in the United States, Canada, Mexico, Puerto Rico, U.S. Virgin Islands, and the Middle East. For 2010, 93,165 Mercury vehicles were sold, nearly 265,000 fewer than in 2000. As Ford announced the closure of the Mercury brand, signage related to the brand began to disappear from Lincoln-Mercury dealers. To reflect the change completely, in December 2012, Ford renamed the Lincoln Division as the Lincoln Motor Company (its name before World War II).

On January 4, 2011, the final Mercury automobile was produced: a Grand Marquis assembled by St. Thomas Assembly. With nearly 2.8 million Marquis built, the longest-produced Mercury model line was second only to the Cougar in overall sales.

As of 2026, Mercury remains an active, registered trademark of Ford.

==== Sales figures ====
Sales figures (2000–2010)
Year	2000	2001	2002	2003	2004	2005	2006	2007	2008	2009	2010	Total sales (2000–2010)
Grand Marquis	122,572	112,034	80,271	79,147	76,116	64,716	54,688	50,664	29,766	24,783	28,543	723,300
Milan						5,321	35,853	37,244	31,393	27,403	28,912	166,126
Mariner					7,171	34,099	33,941	34,844	32,306	28,688	29,912	200,961
Mountaineer	46,547	45,574	48,144	49,692	43,916	32,491	29,567	23,849	10,596	5,169	5,791	341,336
Montego					2,974	27,007	22,332	10,755				63,068
Sable	103,030	102,646	98,998	61,342	42,737	24,149		10,366	16,187	6,256	37	465,748
Marauder				7,839	3,213							11,052
Mystique	16,208											16,208
Cougar	40,343	29,487	19,345	2,024								91,199
Villager	30,443	22,046	16,442									68,931
Monterey				2,213	17,407	8,166	4,467	700				32,953
Total Mercury Division sales	359,143	311,787	263,200	202,257	193,534	195,949	180,848	168,422	120,248	92,299	93,195	Total sales (2000–2010) 2,180,882

== Leadership ==
- Benson Ford (1948–1955)
- Francis C. “Jack” Reith (1955–1957)
- Ben D. Mills (1958–1964)
- Paul Francis Lorenz (1964–1966)
- Gar Laux (1966–1971)
- Ben Bidwell (1971–1973)
- William P. Benton (1973–1976)
- Walter S. Walla (1977–1979)
- Walter J. Oben (1979–1980)
- Gordon V. MacKenzie (1980–1985)
- Thomas J. Wagner (1985–1989)
- Ross H. Roberts (1989–1991)
- Lee R. Miskowski (1991–1994)
- Keith C. Magee (1994–1996)
- James G. O'Connor (1996–2000)
- Mark Hutchins (2001)
- Brian P. Kelley (2002)
- Darryl Hazel (2002–2006)
- Mike Richards (2006–2008)
- Brett Wheatley (2008)
- John Felice (2009–2010)
- C.J. O'Donnell (2010–2011)

== Mercury in Canada ==
During the middle of the 20th century, the small dealership network of Ford Motor Company in Canada necessitated some branding changes to attract buyers into showrooms. This was especially the case in smaller, rural communities in need of trucks, as these areas were served by either a Ford or a Lincoln-Mercury dealer, but rarely both. Mirroring General Motors in Canada, Monarch competed against Oldsmobile while Meteor competed against Pontiac; Mercury trucks competed against GMC.

Following the demise of Edsel and its effects on the Lincoln-Mercury division as well as the Canada–United States Automotive Products Agreement, Ford largely integrated its model lines across the United States and Canada by the end of the 1960s.

=== Mercury 114 ===
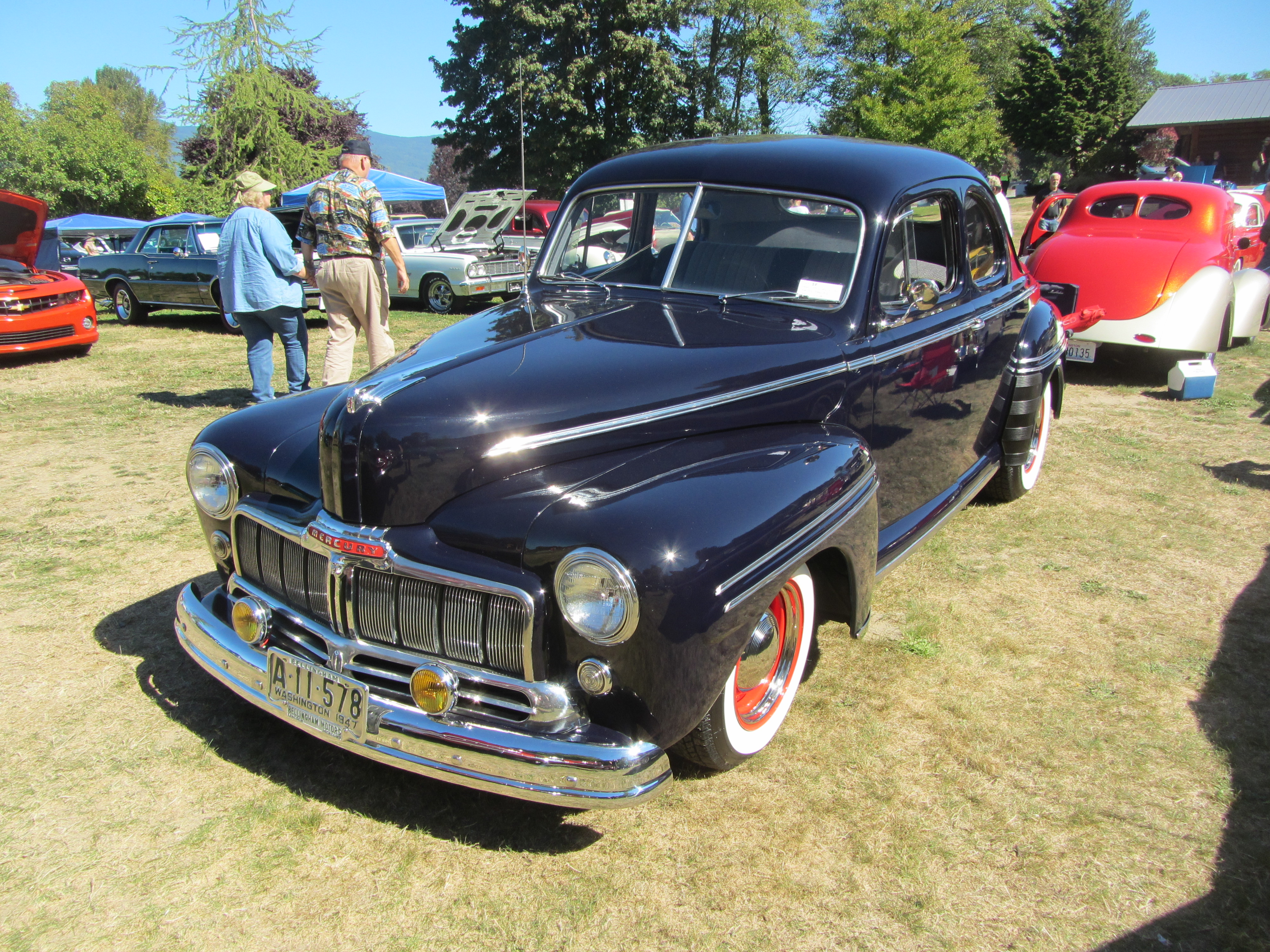
1947 Mercury 114

After World War II, Ford of Canada split their dealer network into two divisions. Existing dealers sold Ford and Monarch models while the new Mercury-Lincoln dealers sold Mercurys and Lincolns.

The Mercury 114 was introduced in 1946 to give Mercury-Lincoln dealers a lower-priced car to sell. The 114 was essentially a Ford with a Mercury-style grille, taillights and trim. Its name was a reference to its 114-inch Ford wheelbase with the larger Mercury models sold in Canada as the Mercury 118 due to its longer wheelbase.

The 114 was marketed in DeLuxe and Super DeLuxe versions and was offered in Fordor Sedan, Tudor Sedan, and Business Coupe, 6-passenger Sedan Coupe, Convertible and Station Wagon body styles. A Sedan Delivery model was also offered. The 114 was initially powered by a 221 cubic inch Ford V8 engine however after June 1946 it was enlarged to 239.4 cu. in. displacement.

The appearance of the 1947 114 differed from that of the 1946 model in that the chrome strip surrounding the side windows was lacking and the hubcaps were of a different design. There were virtually no changes made for 1948. There was no 114 offered for 1949 however it was succeeded by a similar model, the Meteor.

Production of the 114 totaled 4,573 for the 1946 calendar year, 10,393 for 1947 and 2,716 for 1948.

=== Monarch ===
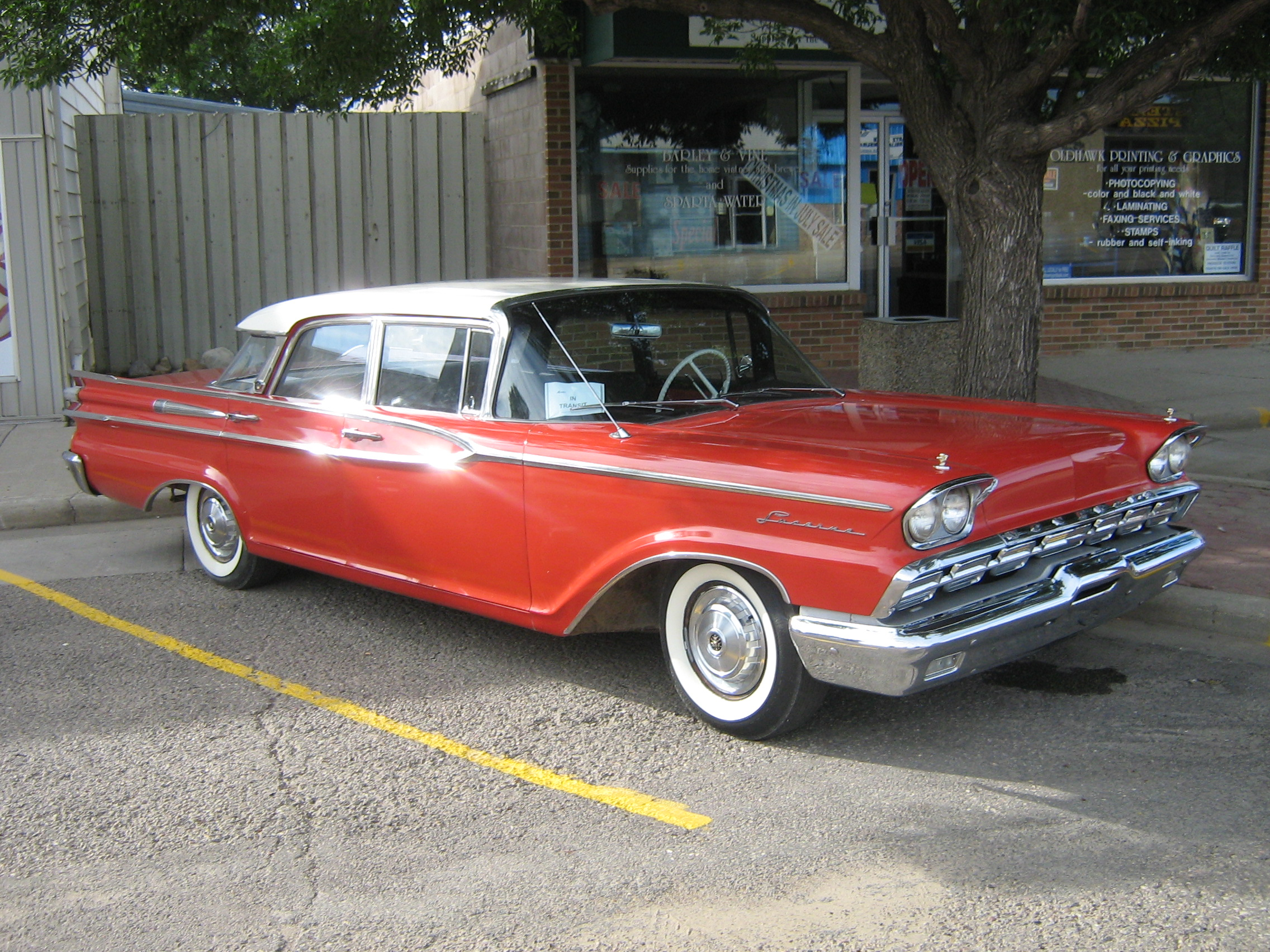
1959 Monarch Lucerne

From 1946 to 1957, to attract buyers of medium-price vehicles, Ford of Canada marketed the Monarch brand in their dealership network. Using much of the body and trim of the Mercury, Monarch was a three-model line with the Richelieu, Lucerne and Sceptre matching the Mercury Monterey, Montclair, and Park Lane, respectively. It was sold at Ford dealerships, offering an upgraded car from the standard Ford line.

Ford of Canada replaced Monarch with the Edsel brand for 1958; a poor reception to Edsel in Canada led to the return of Monarch for 1959. The same year, the Ford Galaxie was introduced, shifting the Ford brand upward in price and content; fearing brand overlap with the Galaxie, Ford of Canada ended the Monarch brand after the 1961 model year.

In 1975, the Monarch nameplate would again become associated with Mercury (in both the United States and Canada), becoming the counterpart of the Ford Granada.

=== Meteor ===
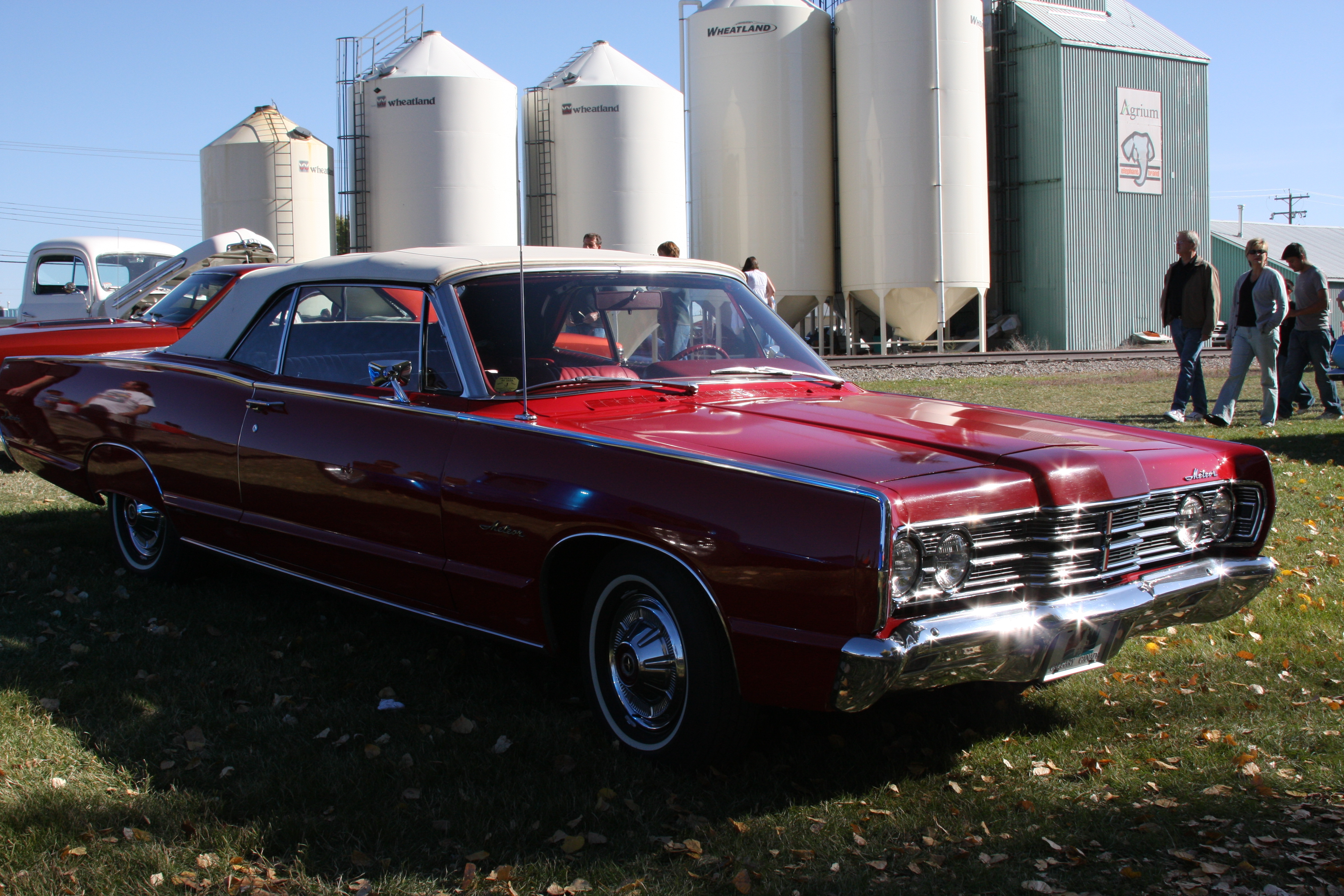
1967 Meteor Montcalm convertible

From 1949 to 1976, Lincoln-Mercury of Canada marketed the Meteor nameplate as its lowest-price brand to compete in lower-price markets (most closely against Pontiac). In contrast to the Monarch which used a Mercury body, the early Meteor models combined a Ford body with a Mercury grille and trim. The brand was marketed as a four-model counterpart of the Ford line (Meteor, Niagara, and Rideau; the Montcalm was added in 1959 to match the Galaxie).

For 1962 and 1963, Lincoln-Mercury of Canada dropped the Meteor brand, coinciding with the introduction of the namesake Mercury product line and as Mercury distanced itself from Lincoln in price at the beginning of the 1960s. In 1964, Meteor was revived in Canada (replacing the Mercury Monterey in the same market). Unlike previous Meteors, the 1964 model used a Mercury body rather than a Ford body. For 1965, Meteors used revived Rideau and Montcalm model names on Mercury bodies with Ford-style roofs. For 1967, its equivalent of the LTD was named the Montego, renamed the LeMoyne for 1968 when Mercury themselves took over the Montego name for one of its models.

In 1968, Lincoln-Mercury of Canada added Mercury badging to Meteor vehicles, gradually beginning to integrate Meteor into its model line. After 1976, the Rideau and Montcalm were discontinued, combined as a base Meteor trim level for the Mercury Marquis in Canada; Lincoln-Mercury of Canada dropped the Marquis Meteor after the 1981 model year.

=== Trucks ===
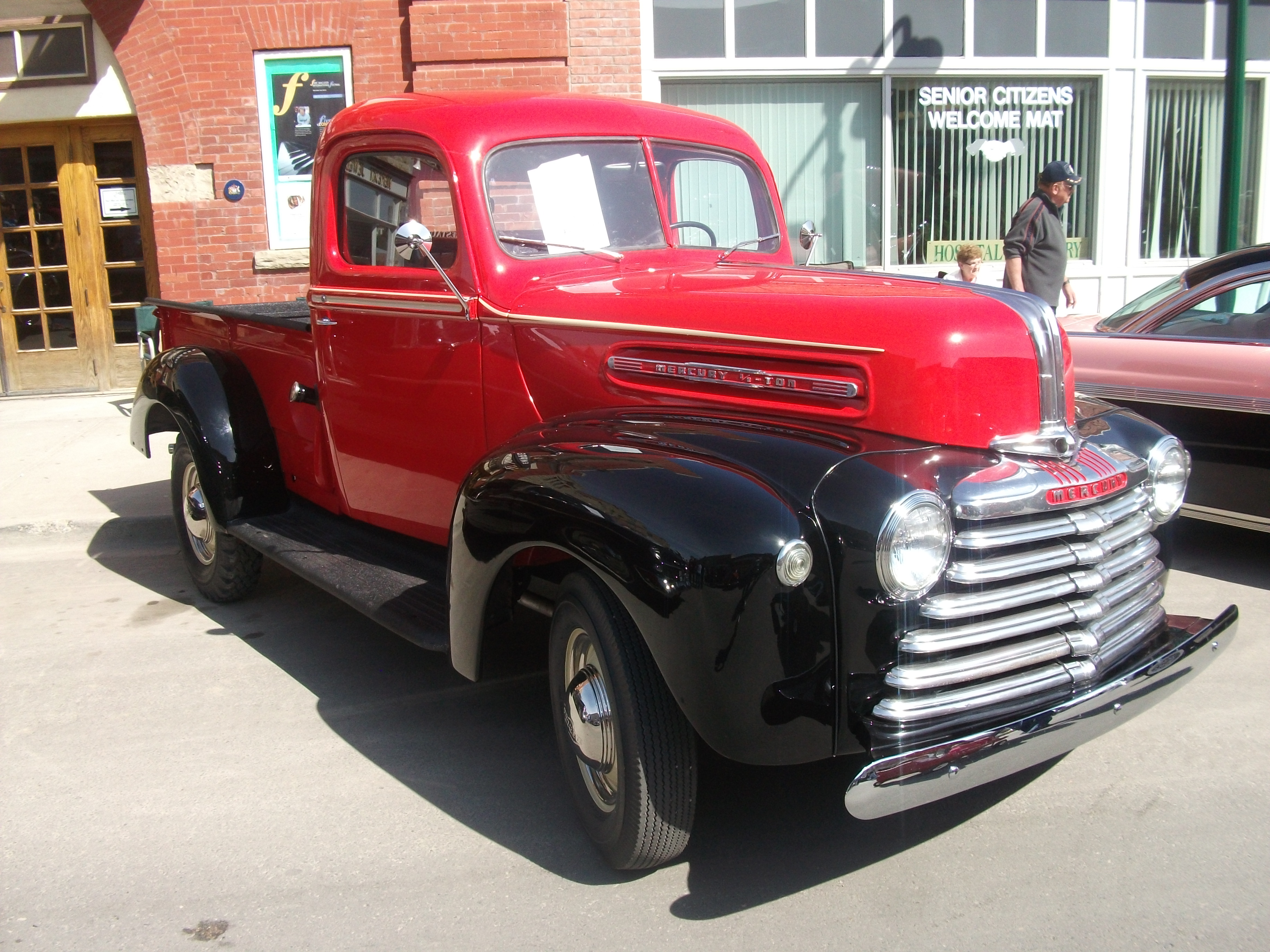
1947 Canadian Mercury M-Series truck

To increase the availability of its truck lineup in Canada, Ford introduced Mercury-badged trucks in Lincoln-Mercury dealerships in 1946. Initially rebadging the Ford F-Series light trucks as the Mercury M-series, the product range was expanded to include Mercury-badged versions of the medium-duty Ford F-series (and its school bus chassis variant), the C-Series COE truck, and a Mercury version of the Econoline. Sharing nearly identical bodywork with Ford trucks, Mercury-badged trucks were largely distinguished by a division-specific grille and exterior trim and badging.

Sold only in Canada, Ford ended sales of Mercury-badged trucks after 1968 (sales of the Mercury version of the C-Series COE continued through 1972); during the 1960s, the M-series shifted closer in appearance to its Ford counterpart. Following the withdrawal of the M-series, Mercury permanently ended pickup truck production, not marketing another light truck until the 1993 Villager minivan.

== Brand identity ==
=== Logo ===
The first logo of the Mercury brand was its namesake, the Roman god Mercury. Towards the early years of the brand, Mercury used its Roman namesake in a silhouette profile (with signature bowl hat with wings, as shown in the image). This logo was briefly revived for 2003–2004, used in the alloy wheel centers of the Mercury Marauder.

In the mid-1950s, Mercury introduced "The Big M", the namesake letter with horizontal extensions at its bottom; at the time, Mercury was a prime sponsor of The Ed Sullivan Show. After 1959, the "Big M" was replaced by a crest emblem. In various forms, Mercury would use a crest emblem on its vehicles through the end of the 1980s. While upper-trim models (such as the Grand Monarch Ghia or Marquis) would feature a crest on the hood or grille, lower-trim models (such as the Monterey or Montego) featured a crest in places such as the wheels. For a time, the Marquis (later Grand Marquis) used a modified version of the Lincoln star emblem.

Following the 1967 introduction of the Mercury Cougar, the branding of Mercury vehicles changed; similar to the Ford Mustang pony emblem, the Cougar adopted its own "prowling cat" logo. During the 1970s, the Cougar became the most popular Mercury vehicle, with a "Sign of the Cat" advertising campaign launched by the division; commercials for all Mercury vehicles during this era ended with a shot of a growling cougar seated atop a Lincoln-Mercury sign (like the then-current outdoor signage at the dealerships, which also featured the Ford "blue oval" logo) and the voiceover announcer intoning "at the sign of the cat". From 1976 to 1978, Mercury used an adaptation of the Dixieland jazz standard "Tiger Rag" as a commercial jingle for the Bobcat, its badge-engineered version of the Ford Pinto. For 1977, the Cougar logo was revised from a "prowling cat" to a "cat-head" emblem, later adapted by the Mercury Lynx, Mercury LN7 and the Mercury Capri.

In 1984, Mercury introduced what would become its final brand emblem (pictured in the article information box). Centered in the grille, the silver Mercury emblem is a set of three stacked obtuse angles (also in silver). Introduced with the Mercury Topaz, the emblem was adopted by the Lynx and Sable, with the Grand Marquis/Colony Park adopting it in 1988 (on hood ornaments and wheels). In 1999, the emblem saw a minor revision, with the word "Mercury" added to the top half of the emblem. The emblem became the final design featured for a hood ornament of an American-brand automobile, offered as an option for the Grand Marquis for 2005 (for a single year).

Various Mercury brand emblems, 1939–2011

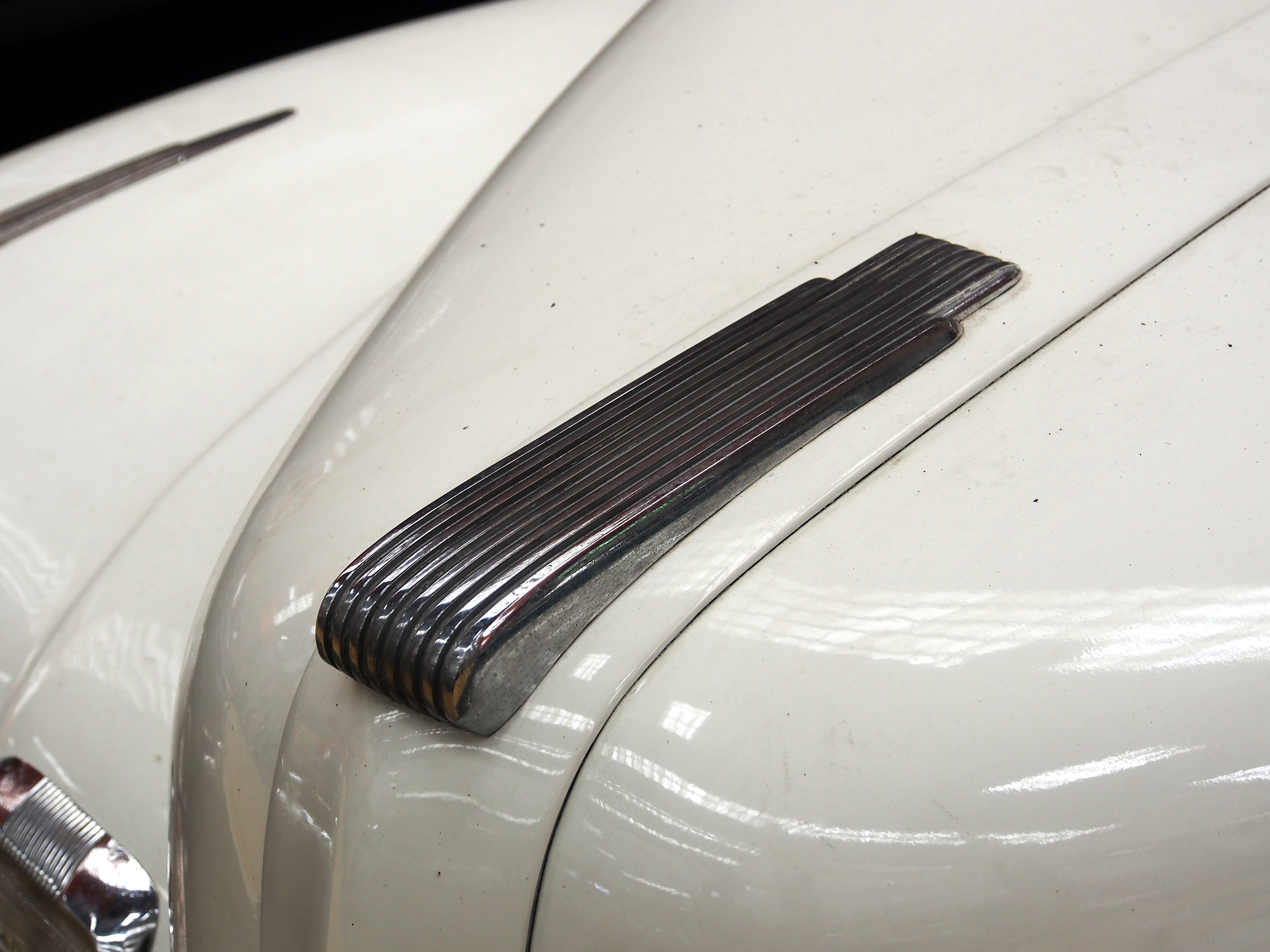
hood ornament, 1947 Mercury

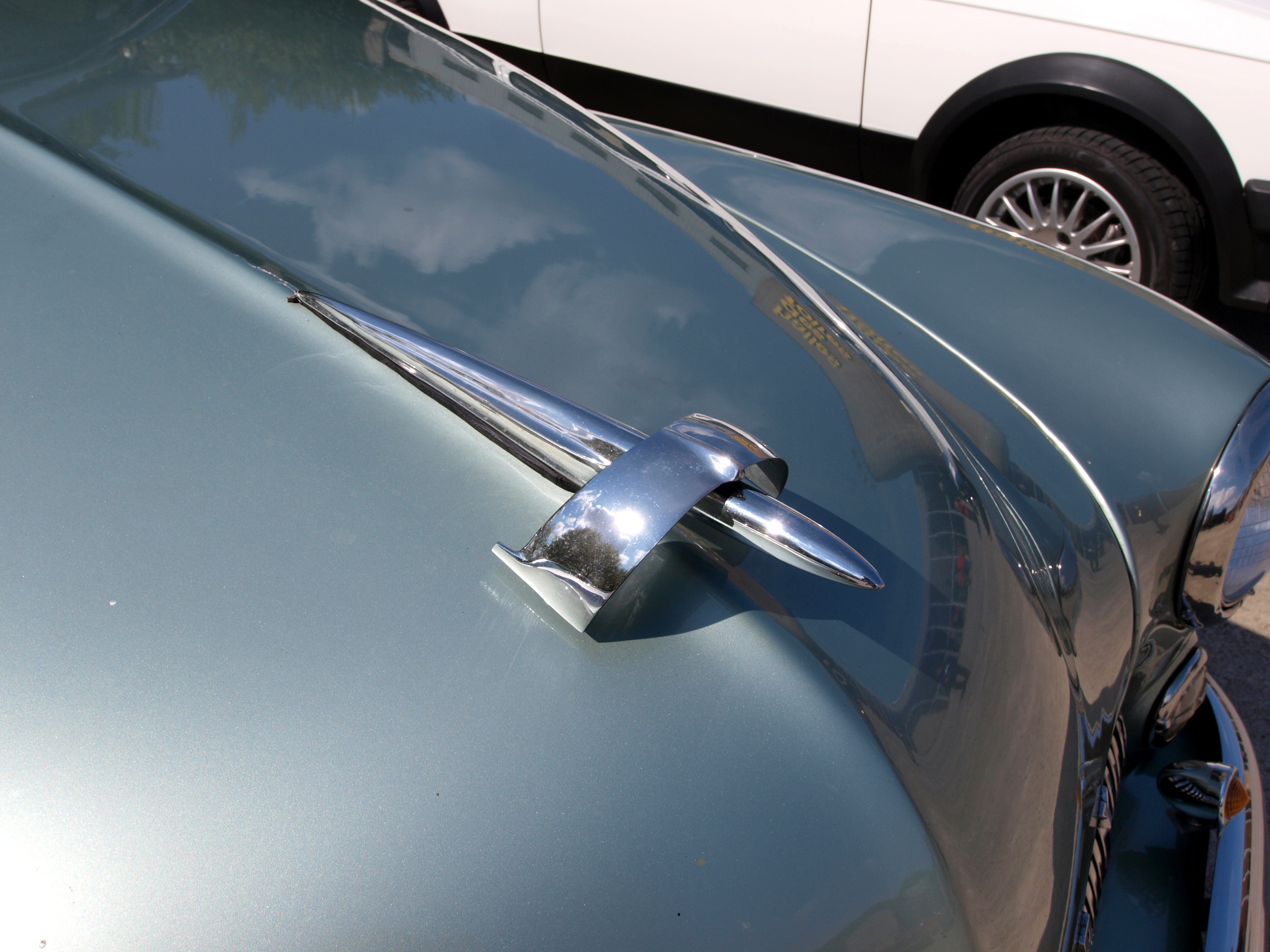
hood ornament, 1951 Mercury Eight

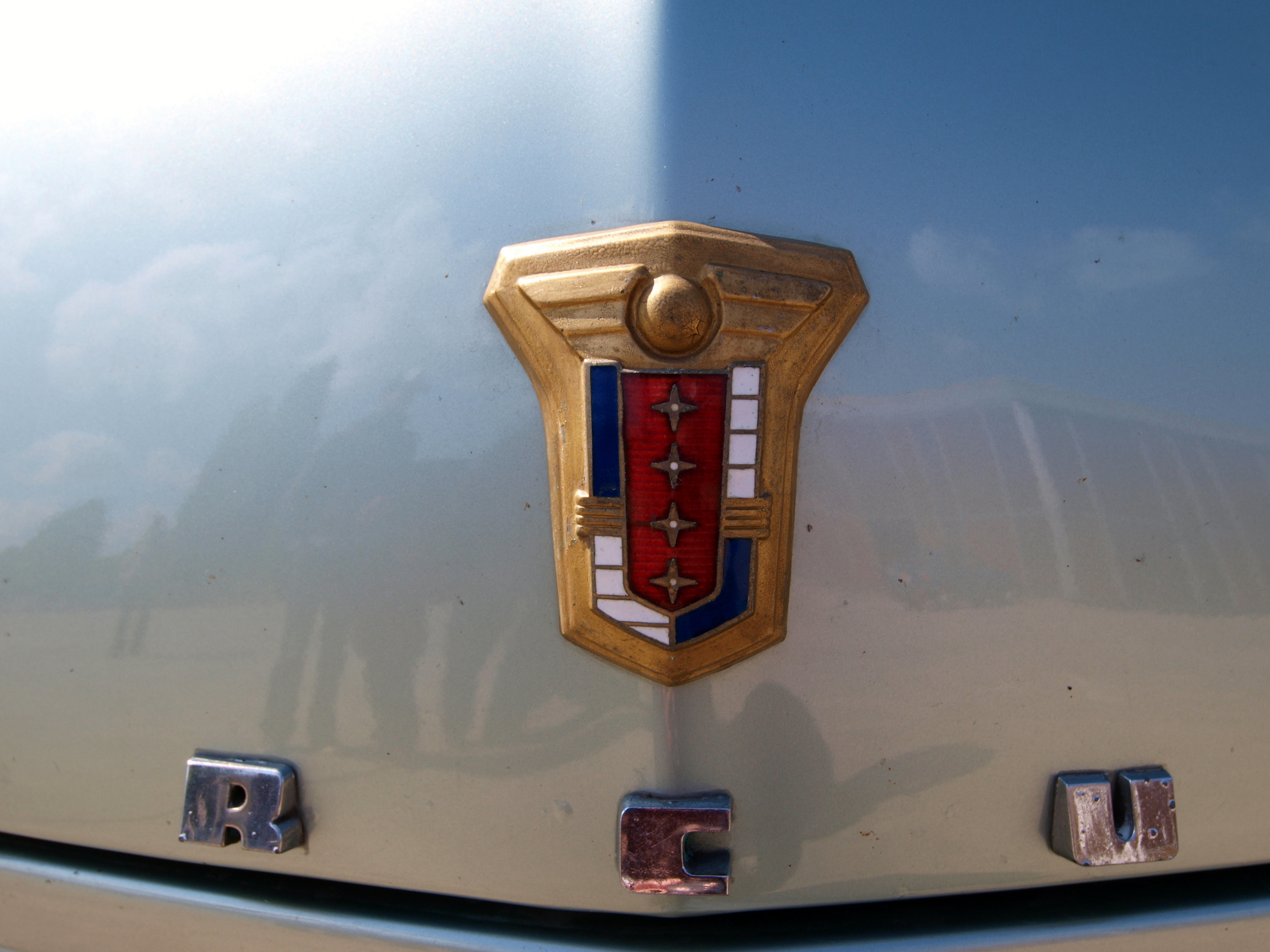
trunklid badge, 1951 Mercury

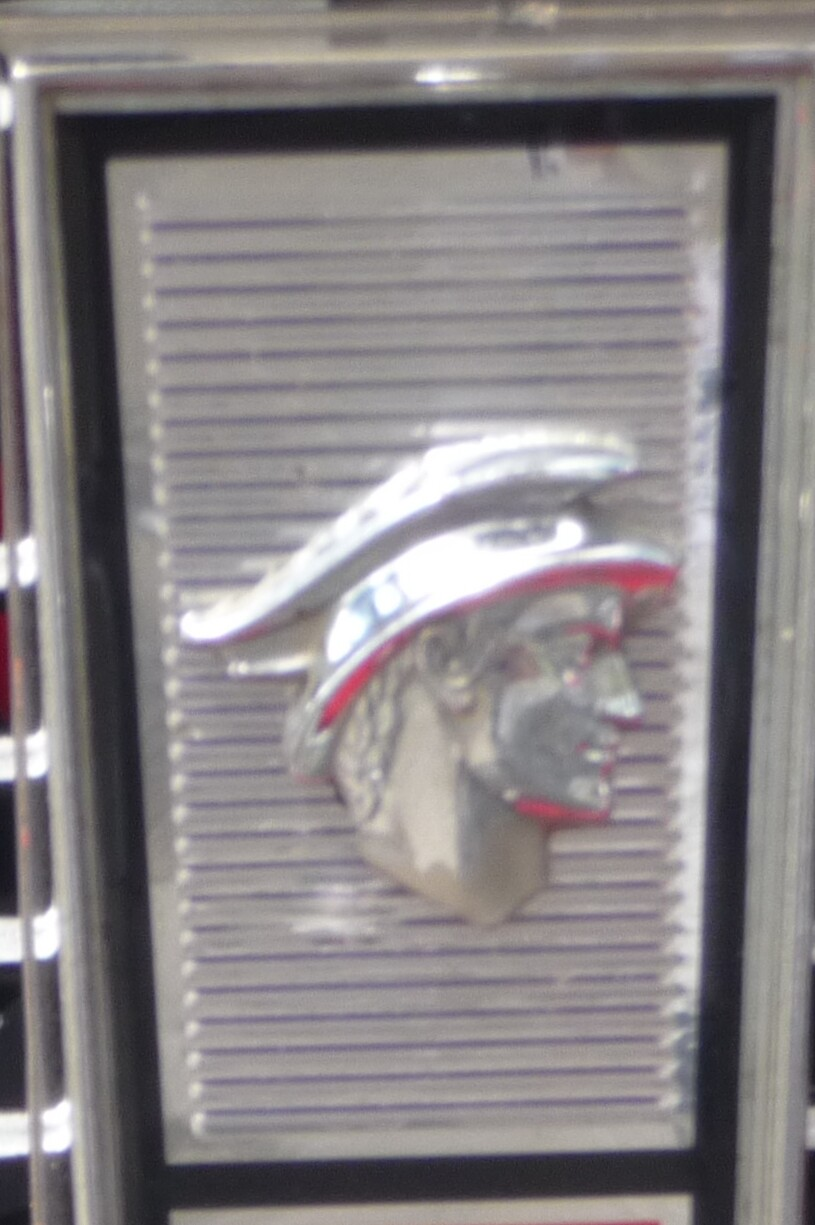
"Mercury Head" emblem (1965 Mercury Comet Caliente)

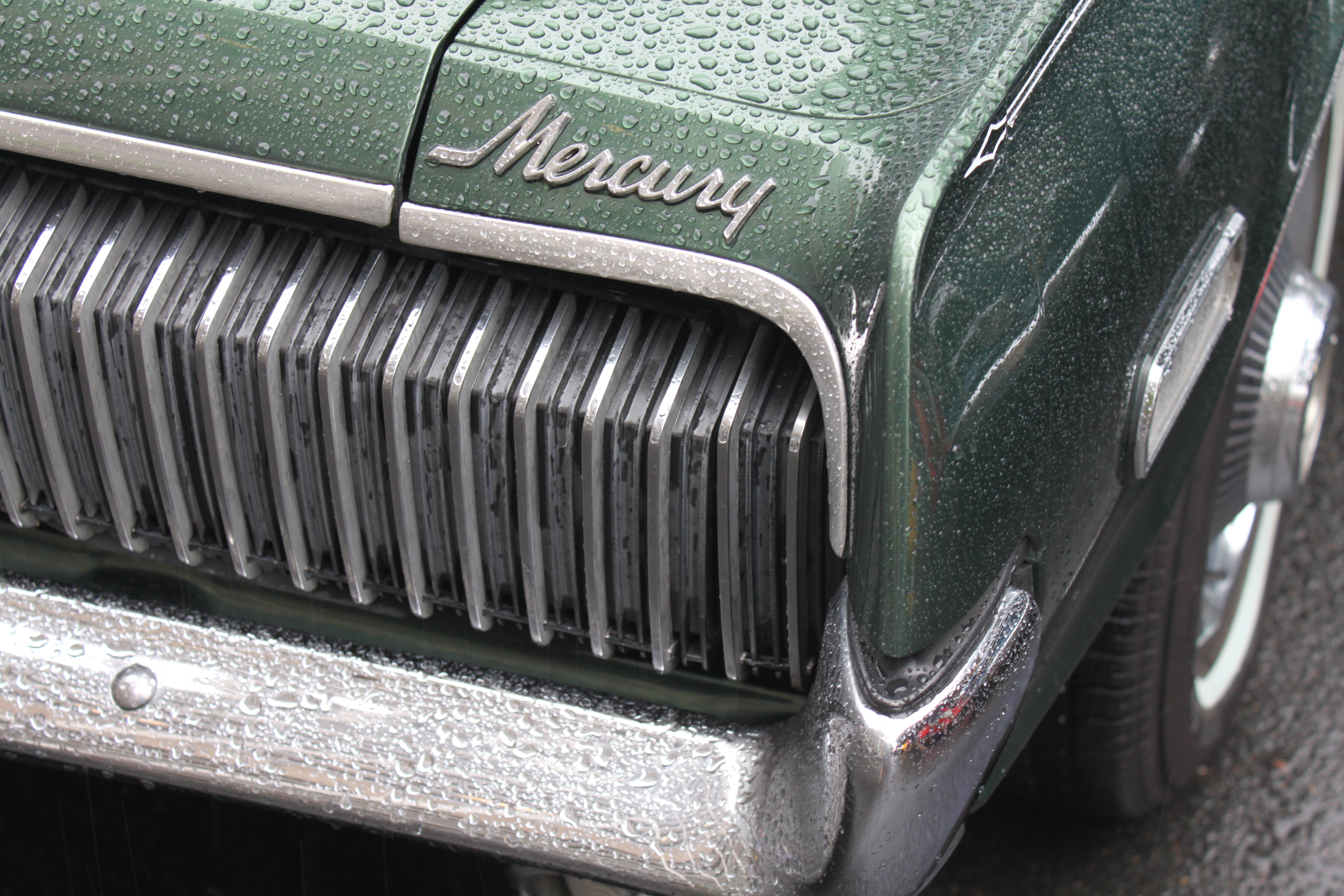
1960s Mercury script (on 1967–1969 Cougar)

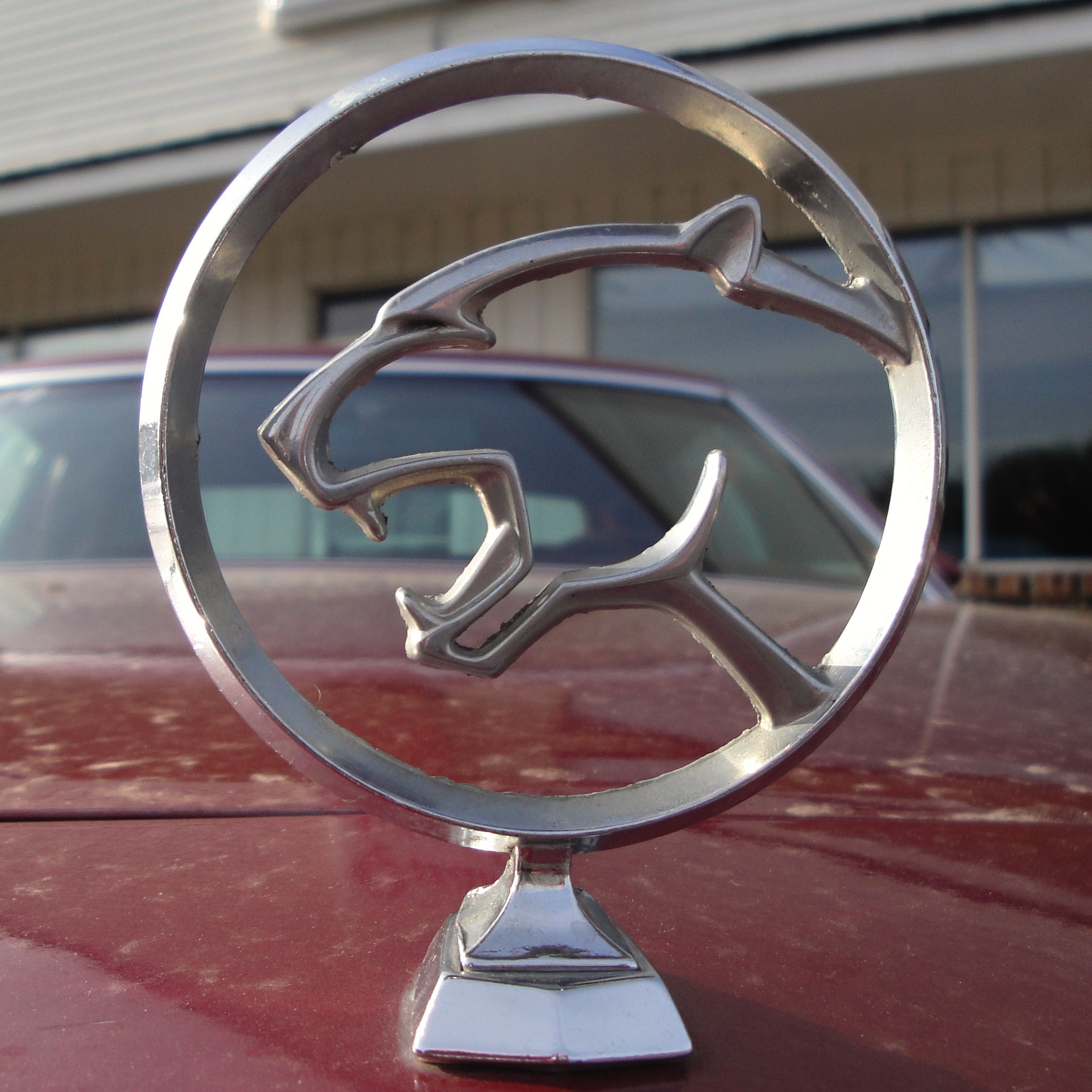
1977–1979 Mercury Cougar XR-7 "cat head" hood ornament

Final Mercury emblem (2000–2005 Sable grille)

=== Grille design ===
The Mercury styling of the brand is most commonly associated with a waterfall-style grille. First making an appearance in the 1946 Mercury Eight, the design was revived in the 1961–1964 Monterey/Colony Park. The design would reappear in the debut of the Mercury Cougar, as designers sought to differentiate the model from the Ford Mustang. During the 1970s, the vertical waterfall grille design was adapted by nearly all Mercury vehicles (except for the Capri and Comet).

In 1986, as part of the introduction of the Mercury Sable and a revision of the Mercury Topaz, the division introduced a "lightbar" front grille. Using low-power light bulbs, the grille between the headlights was illuminated. By 1992, the feature was adapted by all Mercury vehicles (except for the Cougar and Grand Marquis).

In 1997, as part of the introduction of the Mercury Mountaineer SUV, Mercury reintroduced the chrome vertical "waterfall" grille. In place of the radiator-style grille of Lincoln, several grille shapes were initially used, before the division adapted a rectangular grille opening in the mid-2000s.

=== "Breezeway" roof ===
In 1957, Mercury introduced the Mercury Turnpike Cruiser, featuring a roofline with a retractable rear window. From 1958 to 1960, the feature made its return on the Continental Mark-series line, with a reverse-slant rear window (on both hardtops and convertibles). For 1963, Mercury reintroduced the feature as an option for the Monterey; to streamline production, elements of the window design were shared with Ford station wagons. From 1963 to 1966, the optional reverse-slant roofline with retracting rear window was unique to Mercury, featured by no other American brand.

=== Branding ===
Following the replacement of the Mercury Eight by the Mercury Monterey in 1952, the division adopted a nameplate nomenclature for its model lines. For the next six decades, the later Montclair, Medalist, Meteor, Marauder, Montego, (Grand) Marquis, Monarch, Mystique, Mountaineer, Milan, and Mariner all used nameplates starting with "M". Beginning the 1967 debut of the Mercury Cougar, several nameplates were derived from big cats, including the Bobcat and Lynx (with the Sable also adopting an animal name).

Mercury woodgrain-trim station wagons used the Villager nameplate, in line with the Ford Squire name. Reviving a nameplate used by Edsel wagons, Mercury used the nameplate for all station wagons from the 1960s to the 1980s (except for the Colony Park). After becoming dormant in the early 1980s, the Villager name returned in 1993 (as the Mercury Villager minivan).

From the 1980s to the 2000s, Mercury adopted a common trim nomenclature across its model lines, with GS standing for a base-trim model and LS as a high-trim version. For performance-oriented trims, XR was used (Cougar XR7, Topaz XR5, and Capri XR3). From the mid to late-2000s, Mercury shifted its trim nomenclature in line with Lincoln, with full words replacing letter-based designations.

While the introduction of "F" nameplates by Ford was met with controversy in the mid-2000s, the reaction to "M" nameplates by Mercury for its product range was much less extreme. Before the 1980s, the division had used the practice for many of its product lines; several recognized nameplates were revived by the brand (Marauder, Montego, Monterey). While the Milan was outsold by its Ford Fusion counterpart (by a significant margin), the product line met with relative success, overtaking the Grand Marquis as the best-selling Mercury sedan in 2008. The Montego struggled to gain market share against competitive sedans, partly due to model overlap with the Grand Marquis (in contrast, Ford had long ended marketing for the Crown Victoria and ended retail of the model line after 2007).

== See also ==
- List of automobile manufacturers
- List of defunct automobile manufacturers of the United States
- List of Mercury vehicles
