= Lincoln Cosmopolitan =

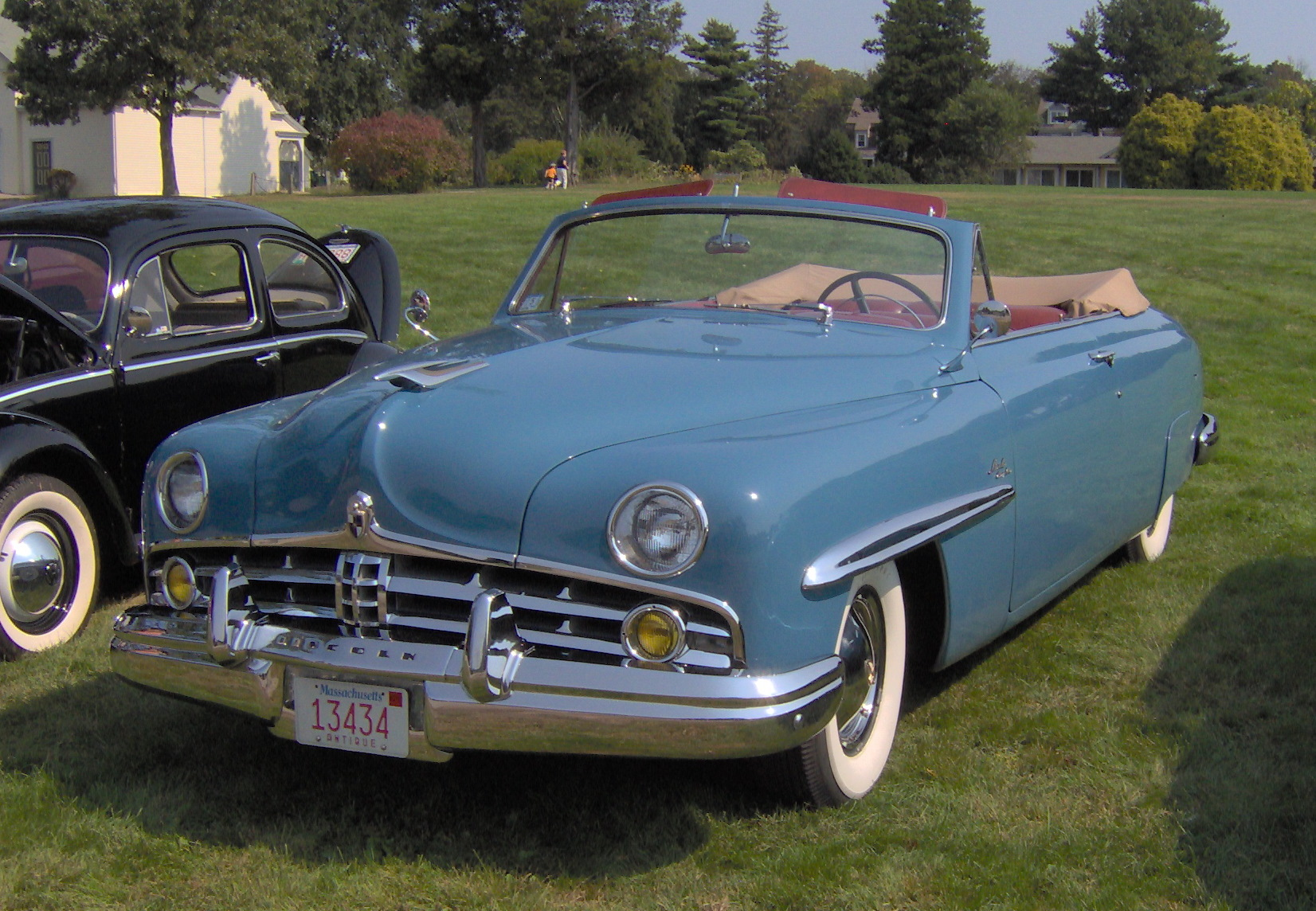
- 1949 Lincoln Cosmopolitan Convertible

Overview
- Manufacturer: Lincoln (Ford)
- Production: 1948–1954

Body and chassis
- Class: full-size luxury car
- Layout: FR layout

Chronology
- Predecessor: Lincoln EL-series
- Successor: Lincoln Premiere (sedan); Lincoln Capri (coupe)

The Lincoln Cosmopolitan is a full-size luxury car that was sold by Lincoln from the 1949 through the 1954 model year. All Lincolns were manufactured at Lincoln Assembly, Dearborn, Michigan, while some were sent in "knock-down kits" to regional factories at Maywood Assembly, Maywood, California or St. Louis Assembly, St.Louis, Missouri, and assembled locally.

== First generation (1949-1951) ==
First generation
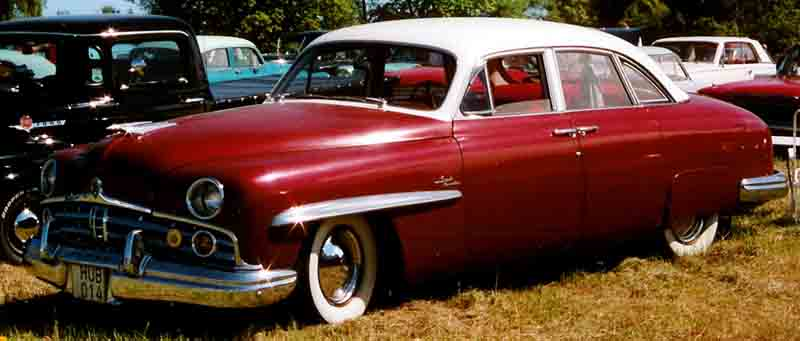
- 1949 Lincoln Cosmopolitan Sport Sedan

Overview
- Model years: 1949–1951
- Assembly: Lincoln Motor Company Plant, Detroit, Michigan (Branch Assembly); Maywood Assembly, Maywood, California
- Designer: Eugene T. "Bob" Gregorie

Body and chassis
- Body style: 2-door coupe 2-door Capri coupe 2-door convertible 4 door sedan

Powertrain
- Engine: 337 cu in (5.5 L) Flathead V8
- Transmission: 3-speed manual 4-speed Hydra-Matic automatic

Dimensions
- Wheelbase: 125.0 in (3,175 mm)
- Length: 1949: 220.5 in (5,601 mm); 1950: 221.2 in (5,618 mm); 1951: 222.5 in (5,652 mm)
- Width: 1949–50: 77.8 in (1,976 mm); 1950–51: 78.2 in (1,986 mm)
- Height: 1949–50: 62.7 in (1,593 mm); 1951: 62.6 in (1,590 mm)
- Curb weight: 4,400–4,800 lb (1,996–2,177 kg)

In 1949, Lincoln introduced its first postwar bodies (the first product lines of the combined Lincoln-Mercury Division); a Mercury Eight-based standard Lincoln and a larger "senior" Lincoln Cosmopolitan using an exclusive body and wheelbase. The two Lincolns were the result of a last-minute revision to Fords original postwar plans for small (Ford), medium (Ford-based Mercury) and large (Lincoln) car variants. When it was decided that the 1949 Ford would be an entirely new, smaller vehicle the originally planned Ford would become the new Mercury, the somewhat longer originally planned Mercury would become the "junior" Lincoln and the originally planned Lincoln would become the "senior" Lincoln Cosmopolitan.

In a departure from previous Lincoln vehicles, the bodywork featured no running boards, with the fenders and doors enclosed together; the Lincolns featured headlights and taillights recessed ("frenched") into the bodywork. At the time, the styling was referred to as a pontoon design. Using a feature that would later appear in the later Lincoln Continental sedan, all Lincoln-Mercury four-door sedans featured rear-hinged suicide doors. Alongside the four-door, the Cosmopolitan was sold as a two-door (in standard and Capri trim) and two-door convertible. There was also a four-door fastback sedan body style (marketed as the Cosmopolitan Town Sedan), but fastbacks rapidly went out of style after WWII and after only 7302 Town Sedans were ordered, the model did not return for 1950. Although Lincoln moved 73,507 total cars for the 1949 model year, 1950 production totaled only 28,150, a nearly 60% drop. The retail price for the convertible was US$3,948.

The Lincoln and the Lincoln Cosmopolitan were powered by a 337 cubic-inch Ford Flathead V8, which was shared with the Ford heavy truck line. Ford did not have a full automatic transmission yet, although an experimental automatic known as Liquamatic had been tested in 1941. An attempt to purchase Packard's Ultramatic transmissions was unsuccessful as Packard could not supply them in sufficient quantities, so Ford instead purchased GM Hydramatics. Although Ford and Mercury would gain automatics for 1951, Lincoln continued using the Hydramatic until 1955. The 1951 model year saw the last Lincolns with manual transmissions until the 2000 Lincoln LS. For the suspension, the chassis was given front coil springs.

All versions of the Lincoln Cosmopolitan came with electro-hydraulically operated windows and front seat as standard equipment, an option on the standard Lincoln. With improved painting technology, Lincoln offered 23 single colors (including metallic selections) and 24 two-tone combinations. Full wheel covers, rear fender skirts, and whitewall tires were standard, while a short list of options included a combination heater and windshield defroster and a radio.

Alongside the Mercury Eight, the 1949-51 Lincoln Cosmopolitan would later gain popularity among late 20th century car customizers creating "lead sleds".

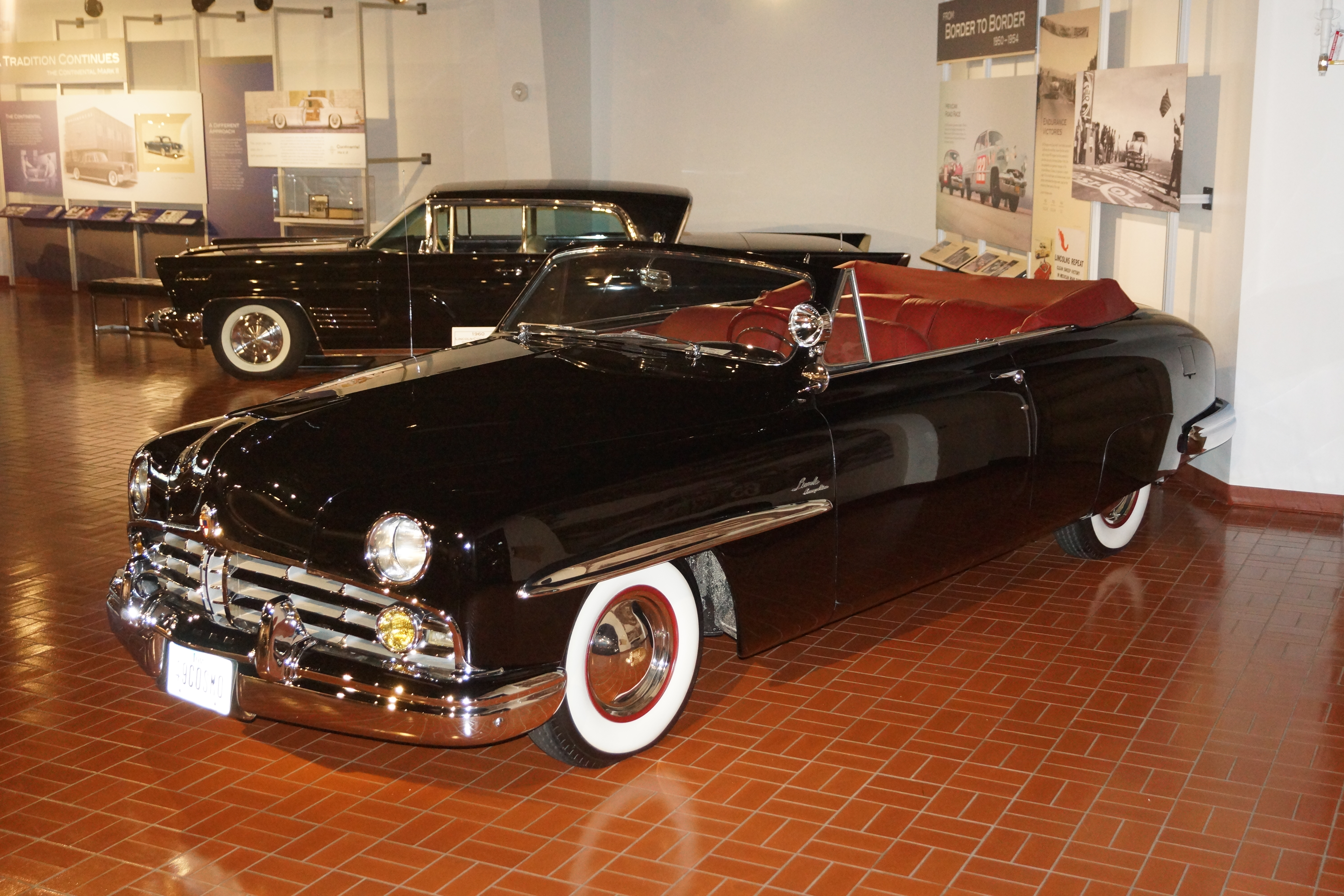
1949 Lincoln Cosmopolitan Convertible

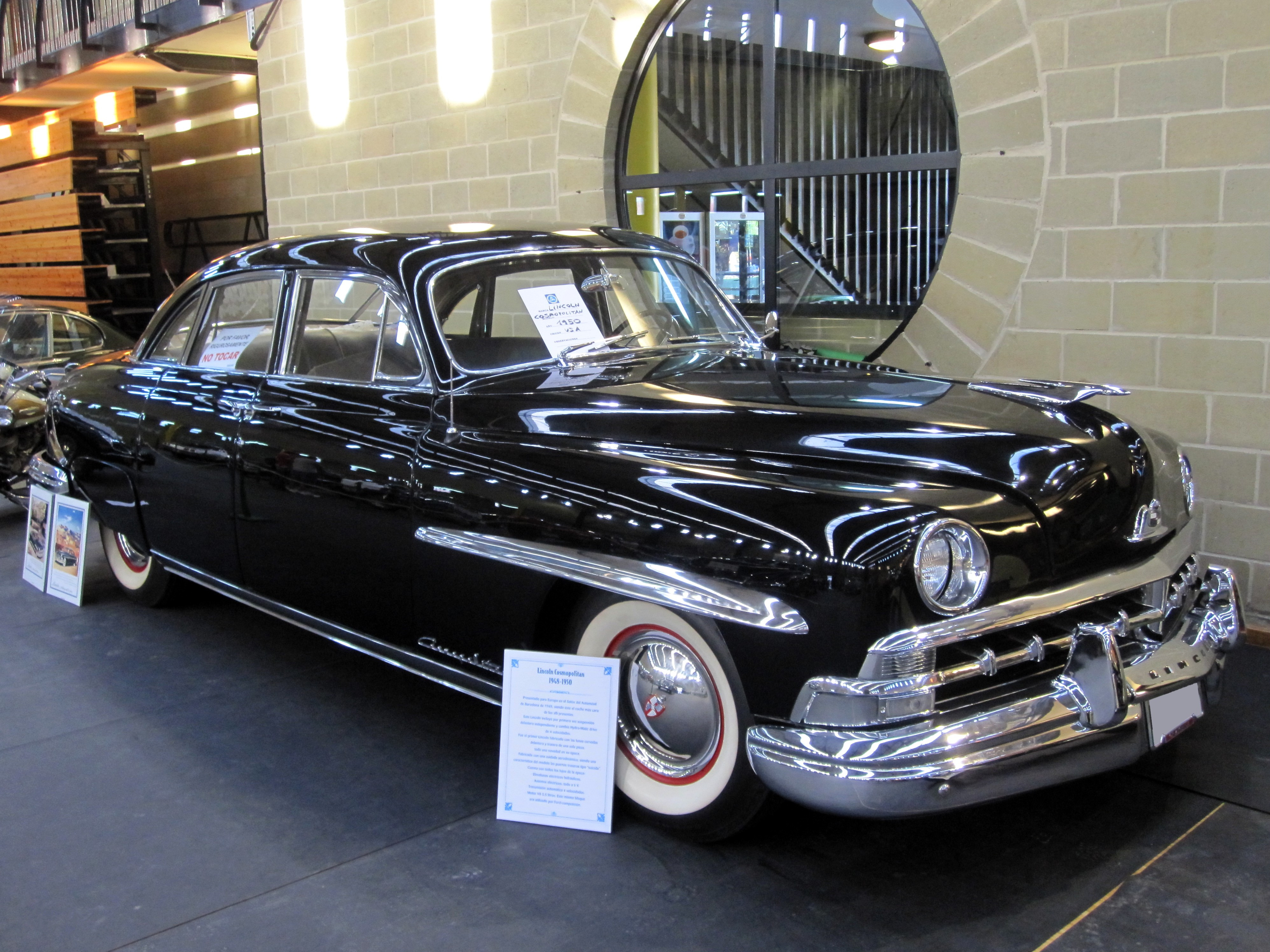
1950 Lincoln Cosmopolitan Sport Sedan

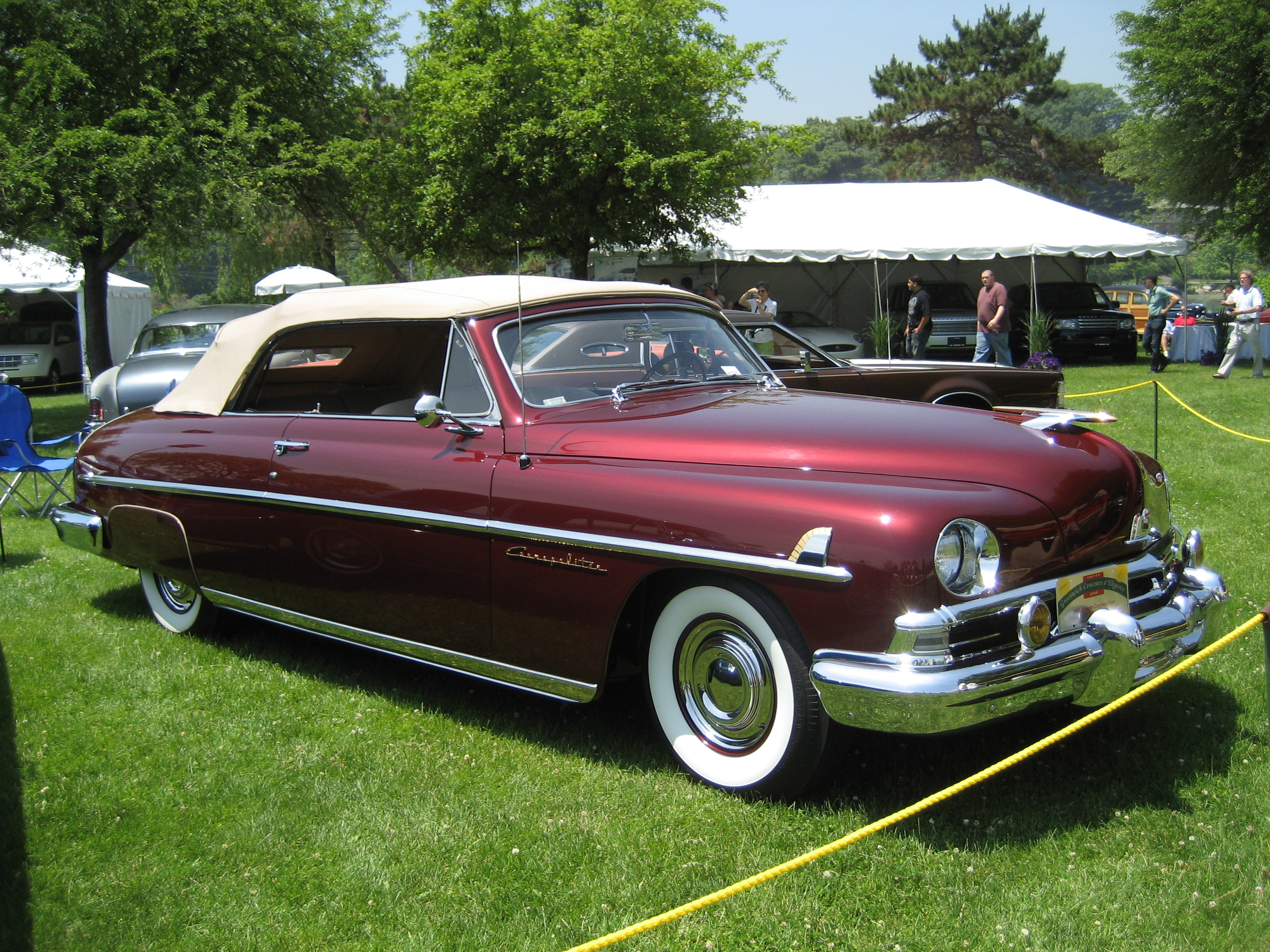
1951 Lincoln Cosmopolitan Convertible

== Second generation (1952-1954) ==
Second generation
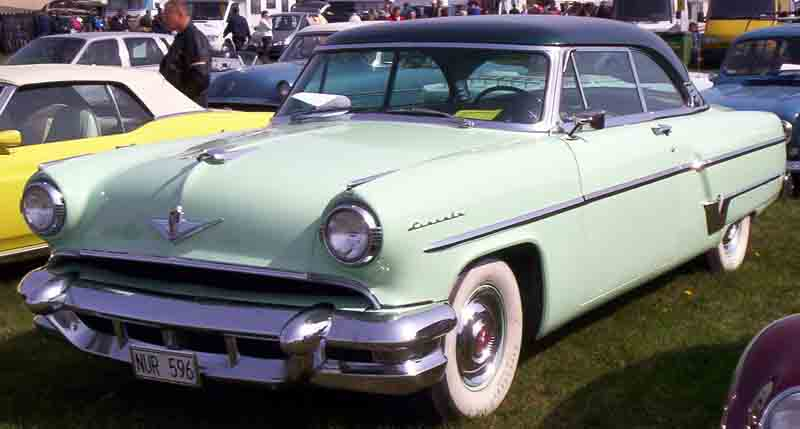
- 1954 Lincoln Cosmopolitan Custom Sport Coupe

Overview
- Model years: 1952–1954
- Assembly: Lincoln Motor Company Plant, Detroit, Michigan; Wayne Stamping & Assembly, Wayne, Michigan (Branch Assembly); Maywood Assembly, Maywood, California; St. Louis Assembly Plant, St.Louis, Missouri
- Designer: Bill Schmidt

Body and chassis
- Body style: 2-door coupe 4-door sedan
- Related: Lincoln Capri; Mercury Monterey; Mercury Custom

Powertrain
- Engine: 317 cu in (5.2 L) Lincoln Y-block V8
- Transmission: 4-speed Hydra-Matic automatic

Dimensions
- Wheelbase: 123.0 in (3,124 mm)
- Length: 1952: 214.0 in (5,436 mm); 1953: 214.1 in (5,438 mm); 1954: 215.0 in (5,461 mm)
- Width: 77.5 in (1,968 mm)
- Height: 62.6 in (1,590 mm)
- Curb weight: 4,300–4,400 lb (1,950–1,996 kg)

The Lincoln-Mercury model line saw a redesign for 1952, with a single basic body design shared between both, and Lincoln incorporating several elements to impart a larger, more substantial look. Not only did the Cosmopolitan lose its unique body and wheelbase but it also ceded top rung status to the new Lincoln Capri. Both Lincoln models differed from the Mercury (renamed the Mercury Monterey) with their own extended rear quarters, Lincoln-specific grille, bumpers, exterior lamps, instrument panel and other trim and fittings. Four-door Lincoln-Mercury vehicles saw the introduction of standard front-hinged rear doors. A convertible was only available in the Capri range, limiting the Cosmopolitan to two-door hardtop and four-door sedan body types.

Along with the new body Lincoln introduced a ball joint front suspension and a high-compression, overhead valve 317 cubic-inch Lincoln Y-block V8, with the 4-speed Hydramatic as the only available transmission.

Lincolns won the top four spots in the Stock Car category of the Pan American Road Race in both 1952 and 1953. while taking first and second place in 1954.

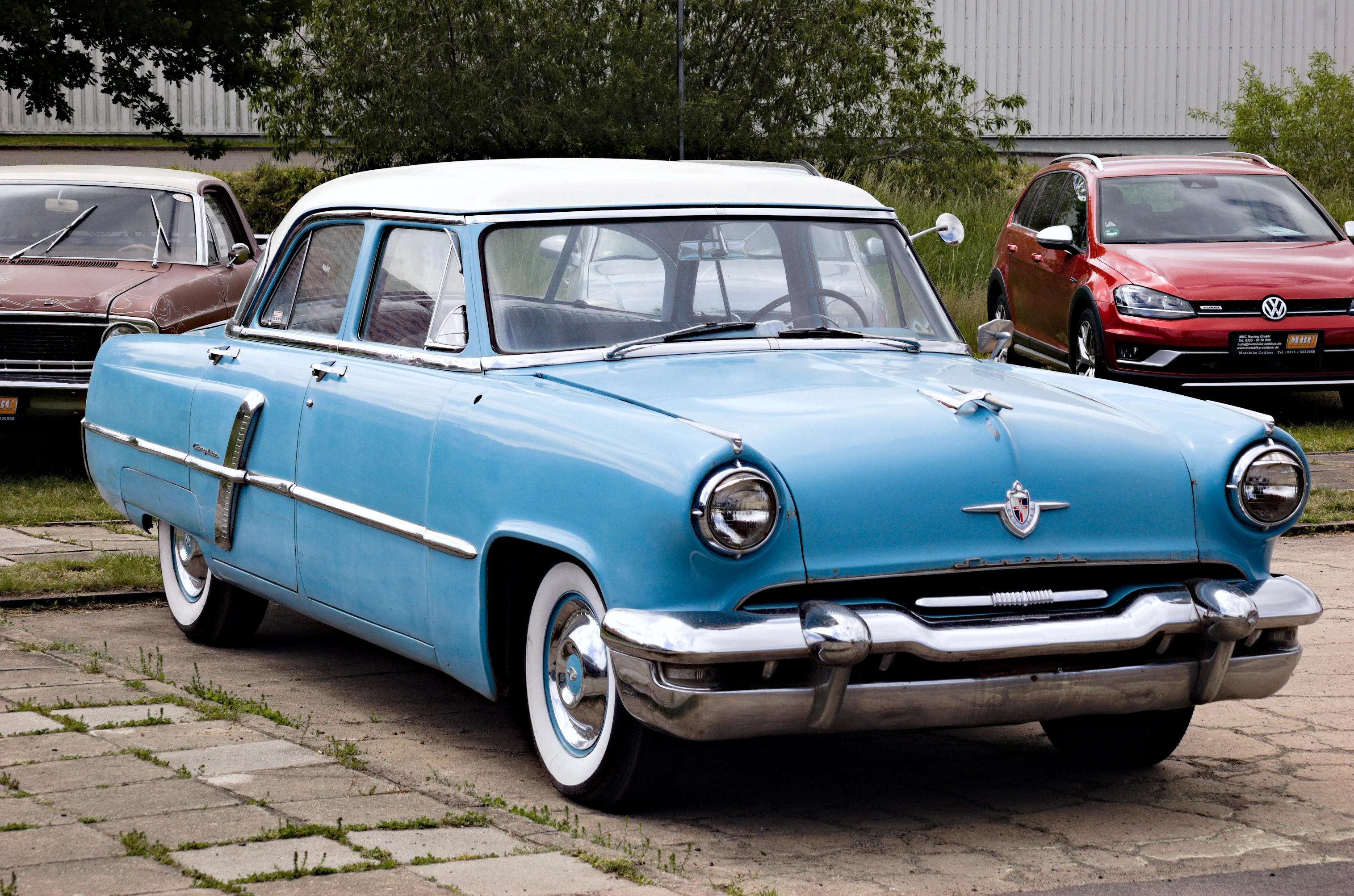
1952 Lincoln Cosmopolitan Custom Four-door Sedan

== Presidential state car ==
In 1950, under the Harry S. Truman presidency, legend has it that Truman held a grudge with General Motors because they would not give him use of their cars during his run for the 1948 presidential election; thus, he chose Lincoln for the presidential state car.

The White House leased ten Lincoln Cosmopolitans, customized by the Henney Motor Company for Lincoln and further modified by the Hess and Eisenhardt Company. The cars were given extra headroom to accommodate the tall silk hats popular at the time, and were painted black. Nine of the automobiles had enclosed bodies, while an armored convertible was reserved especially for President Truman. It was 20 feet (6.1 m) long, 6.5 feet (2.0 m) wide, and weighed 6,500 pounds (2,900 kg), 1,700 pounds (770 kg) heavier than a stock Cosmopolitan. All ten cars were outfitted with 152-horsepower (113 kW) V8 engines "with heavy-duty Hydra-Matic transmissions."

In 1954, President Dwight D. Eisenhower had the Cosmopolitan convertible fitted with a Plexiglas roof that became known as the "Bubble-top"; it remained in presidential service until 1965.
