= Lincoln (EL-series) =

Lincoln EL-Series
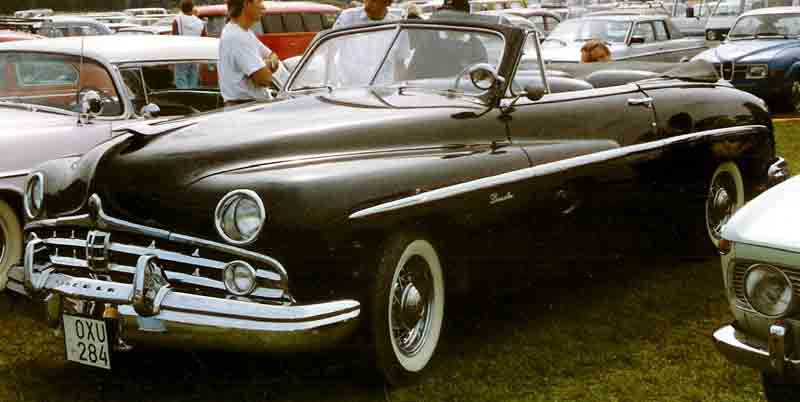
- 1949 Convertible Coupe

Overview
- Manufacturer: Lincoln (Ford)
- Also called: Lincoln
- Model years: 1949–1951
- Assembly: Lincoln Assembly, Dearborn, Michigan (Branch Assembly); Maywood Assembly, Maywood, California
- Designer: Eugene T. "Bob" Gregorie

Body and chassis
- Class: Full-size luxury car
- Body style: 2-door coupe; 2-door Lido coupe; 2-door convertible; 4-door sedan
- Layout: FR layout
- Related: Mercury Eight

Powertrain
- Engine: 336.7 cu in (5.5 L) Flathead V8
- Transmission: 3-speed manual 4-speed Hydra-Matic automatic

Dimensions
- Wheelbase: 121 in (3,073 mm)
- Length: 1949: 213.0 in (5,410 mm); 1950: 213.8 in (5,431 mm); 1951: 214.8 in (5,456 mm)
- Width: 76.7 in (1,948 mm)
- Height: 63.6 in (1,615 mm)
- Curb weight: 4,200–4,400 lb (1,900–2,000 kg)

Chronology
- Predecessor: Lincoln H-series
- Successor: Lincoln Cosmopolitan

The Lincoln EL-Series is a full-size luxury car that was marketed and sold by Lincoln from 1949 to 1951. Replacing the H-Series Lincoln, the postwar model line was the first complete redesign of the Lincoln sedan line since 1936 (its predecessor was derived from the prewar Zephyr). In line with its predecessor, the EL-Series Lincoln carried only the Lincoln nameplate, using no model name. The Lincoln was positioned below the Cosmopolitan within the Lincoln model range.

The first Lincoln developed under the combined Lincoln-Mercury Division of Ford Motor Company, the Lincoln shared much of its body with the 1949 Mercury Eight, distinguished primarily by its longer 121-inch wheelbase. For the first time since 1933, a V8 engine was offered in a Lincoln instead of a V12, now sharing its engine with the Ford F-Series "Big Job" trucks.

Alongside production from Lincoln Assembly (Dearborn, Michigan), production of the EL-Series Lincoln was sourced from Maywood Assembly (Maywood, California). For 1952, the Lincoln was replaced by a redesign of the Cosmopolitan. with Lincoln reviving the use of divisional nameplates across its model line.

== Model History ==
=== 1949 ===
The first all-new postwar Lincolns were introduced on April 22, 1948. They had a more streamlined appearance than the 1948 models, reflecting "ponton" styling. However, the new two-piece windshield seemed a bit out of sync with the modern styling. At a distance, it was hard to tell a Lincoln apart from a Mercury. Recessed headlights and a shinier front end set it apart. The 337 cubic inch Lincoln flathead V8 produced 152 hp (113 kW) at 3600 rpm.

=== 1950 ===
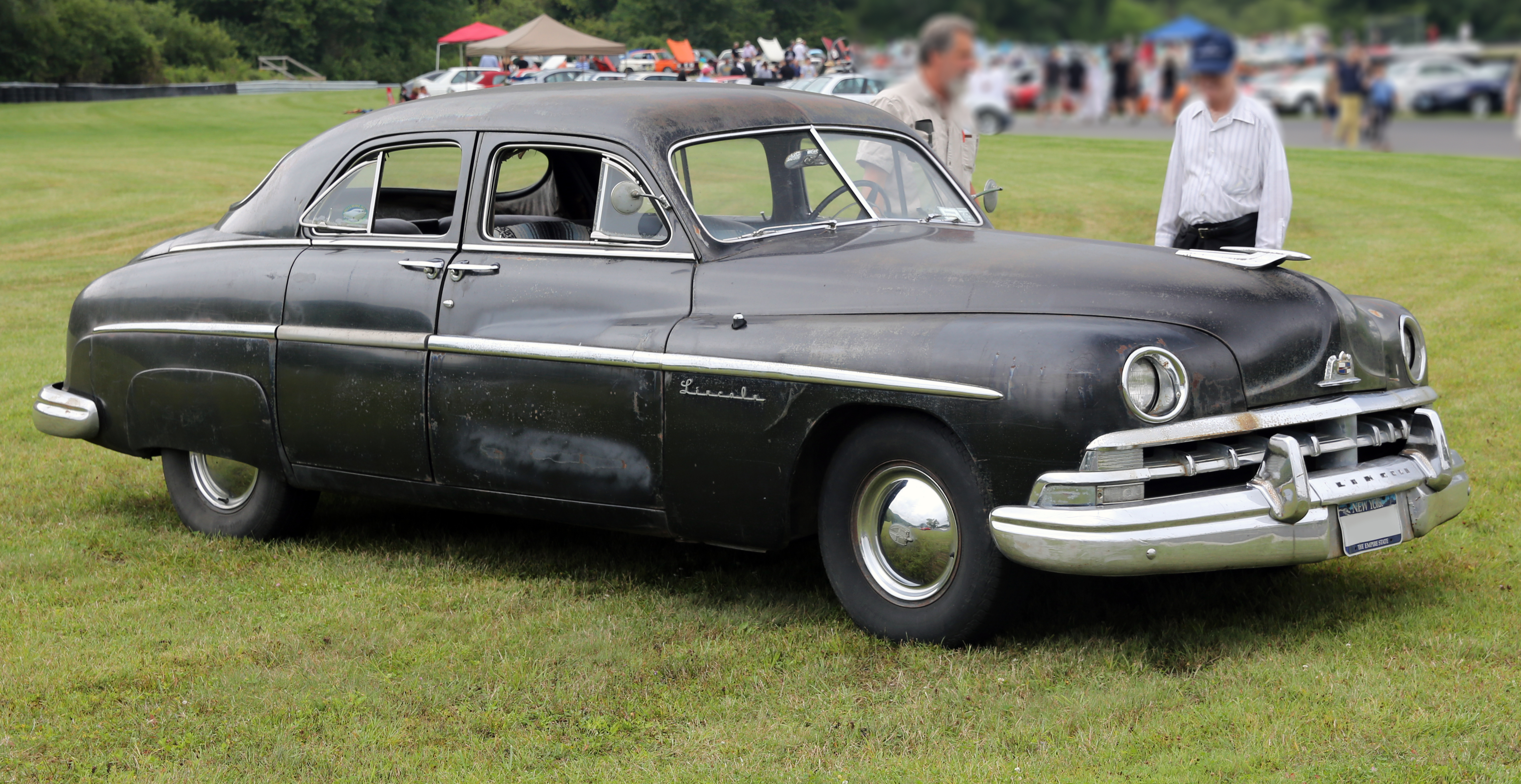
1950 Lincoln four-door sedan with suicide doors

In 1950 a new horizontal grille with elements enhanced the appearance of the standard Lincoln. Its name was in the same location on the front fender as last year, but it was larger. The door handles were improved as was the previously confusing interior layout. The convertible was dropped from the lineup as Mercury's near-identical convertible had outsold it by a wide margin in 1949.

Late in the 1950 model year the engine was upgraded to address vibration and oil consumption concerns. Three rather than four piston rings were fitted, and the engine balancing was improved. As a result the horsepower rating increased marginally and the car ran smoother. The cooling system was also improved and durability was increased thanks to the use of more alloy.

=== 1951 ===
According to the Standard Catalog of American Cars, the front end of the 1951 Lincoln "looked like a 1950 model that had gotten into a fight, and lost." The grille bar only extended from the center section to the bumper guards, while a forward slanting vertical piece was added to the front fender side chrome. The 1951 Mercury's "fishtail" rear design was also adopted, to the detriment of rearward visibility(*). The glamorous Lido coupe returned with a canvas or vinyl roof, fender skirts, rocker panel molding and custom interior. (*)Other than here, there is no reference to a Mercury "fish tail" design. The '51 Lincoln's modified C pillar actually increased rearward vision.

== Lincoln Lido (1950–1951) ==
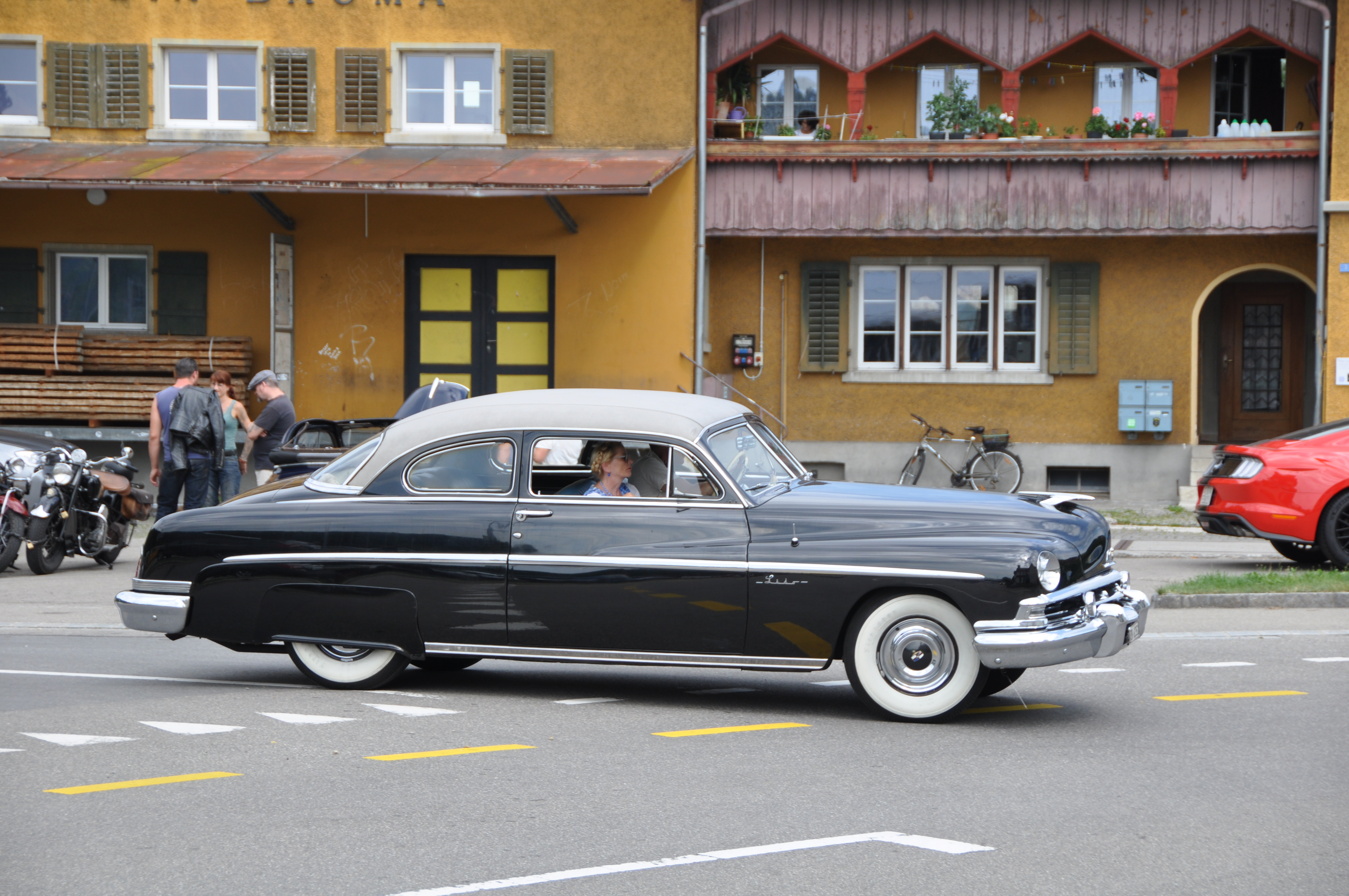
1951 Lincoln Lido at a 2019 car show in Bauma, Switzerland.

On 5 July 1950 the Lincoln Lido was introduced as somewhat of Lincoln's answer to the GM hardtops that had debuted in 1949. List price for the 1950 model was $2,721 ($36,412 in 2025 dollars). It was similar to the Mercury Monterey and the up market Lincoln Cosmopolitan Capri coupes, while the Lido was also offered as a sedan with suicide doors for rear seat passengers. Both years of the Lido featured a vinyl or canvas-covered roof, fender skirts, bright roof drip rails and rocker panel moldings, dual door mirrors, a gold-colored hood ornament from the Cosmopolitan and a custom leather interior with special door and side panels. An electric clock was standard. Few were sold, as customers preferred General Motors' hardtop offerings.

The Lido name reappeared on a 1963 show car called the Lincoln Continental Lido, which was a 1963 Continental with a padded vinyl roof.
