= Lincoln-Zephyr =

Car model

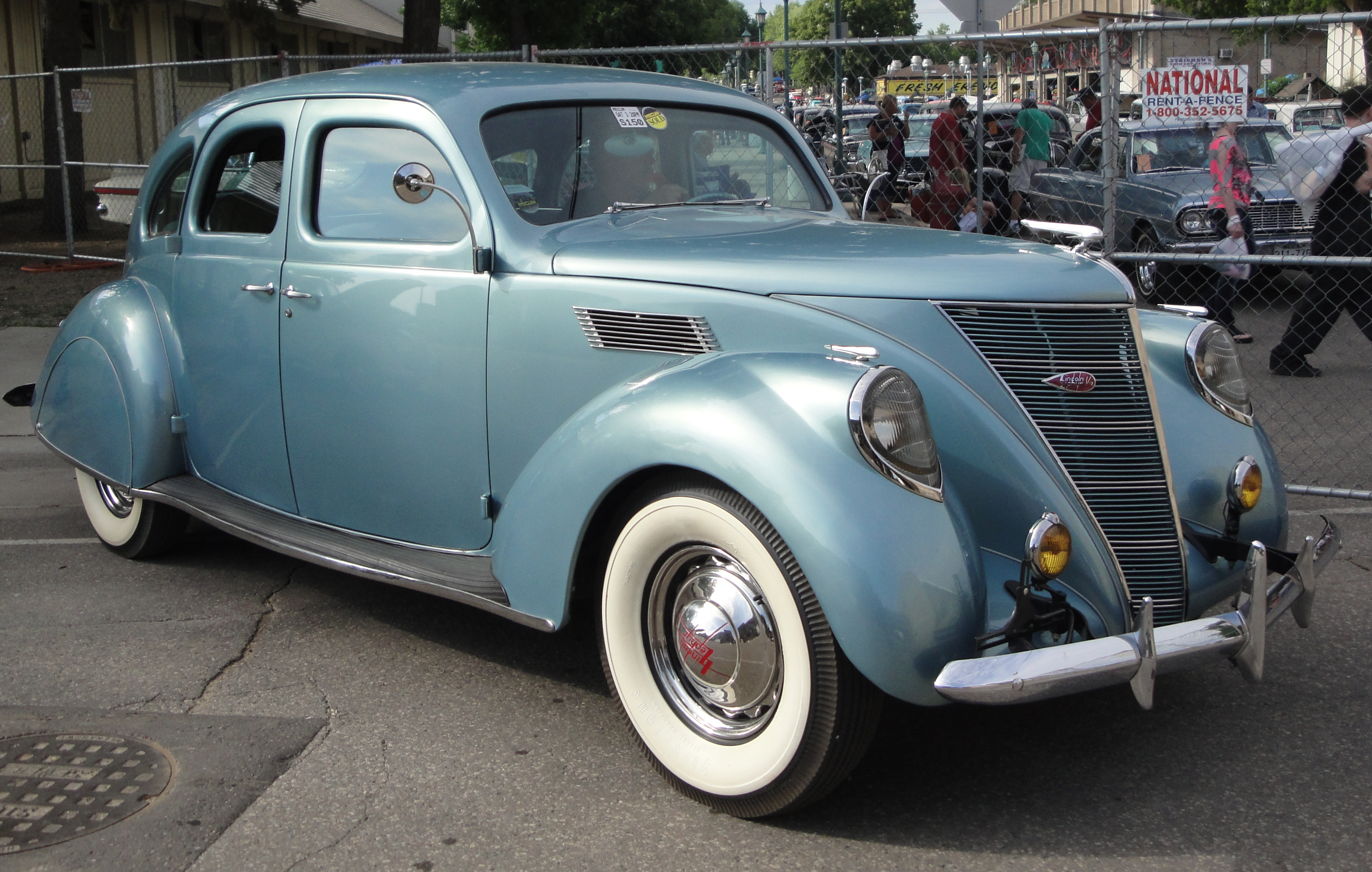
- Lincoln-Zephyr four-door sedan (1937)

Overview
- Manufacturer: Lincoln (Ford)
- Production: 1936–1942
- Assembly: Lincoln Assembly, Detroit, Michigan
- Designer: Bob Gregorie

Body and chassis
- Class: Mid-size luxury car
- Body style: 4-door sedan 4-door convertible sedan 2-door sedan 2-door coupe 2-door convertible coupe
- Related: Lincoln Continental

Powertrain
- Engine: 267 cu in (4.4 L) flat-head 110 hp (82 kW) V12
- Transmission: 3-speed manual

Dimensions
- Wheelbase: 122–125 in (3,099–3,175 mm)
- Length: 202.5–210 in (5,144–5,334 mm)
- Height: 69 in (1,753 mm)

Chronology
- Successor: Lincoln H-series

The Lincoln-Zephyr is a line of luxury cars that was produced by the Lincoln division of Ford from 1936 until 1942. Bridging the gap between the Ford V8 DeLuxe and the Lincoln Model K (in both size and price), it expanded Lincoln to a second model line, competing against the Chrysler Airflow, LaSalle, and the Packard One-Twenty.

Following the discontinuation of the Model K after 1940, Lincoln shifted its production exclusively to the Lincoln-Zephyr design. After World War II, the Zephyr name was dropped.

The Zephyr had been the basis of the first Lincoln Continental, which debuted in 1940 and became Lincoln's longest-running nameplate. The model line was powered by a V12 engine, in contrast to its competitors' V8 and inline-8 engines.

The Lincoln-Zephyr was conceived by Edsel Ford and designed by Eugene Turenne "Bob" Gregorie. It was assembled at the Lincoln Motor Company Plant in Detroit, Michigan.

== Overview ==
Introduced on November 2, 1935, as a 1936 model, the Lincoln-Zephyr was extremely modern with a low raked windscreen, integrated fenders, and streamlined aerodynamic design, which influenced the name "zephyr", derived from the Greek word zephyrus, or the god of the west wind. It was one of the first successful streamlined cars after the Chrysler Airflow's market resistance, and the concept car Pierce Silver Arrow, which never went into production. In fact, the Lincoln-Zephyr actually had a lower coefficient of drag than the Airflow, due in part to the prow-like front grille on the Zephyr, reflecting the popularity of leisure speedboats like Chris-Craft. The Lincoln-Zephyr succeeded in reigniting sales at Lincoln dealerships in the late 1930s, and from 1941 model year, all Lincolns were Zephyr-based and the Lincoln-Zephyr marque was phased out. Annual production for any year model was not large, but accounted for a large portion of the Lincoln brand's sales. In its first year, 15,000 were sold, accounting for 80% of Lincoln's total sales. The Zephyr was offered as a sedan with either two or four doors, and was manufactured in right hand drive for export, and the only options listed were an electric clock, leather upholstery and a matched luggage set from Louis Vuitton. The two door sedan was listed at US$1,275 ($29,582 in 2025 dollars) and the four door sedan was listed at US$1,320 ($30,626 in 2025 dollars)

Production of all American cars was halted by the Government in 1942 as the country entered World War II, with Lincoln producing the last Lincoln Zephyr on February 10. After the war, most makers restarted production of their prewar lines, and Lincoln was no exception. The Zephyr name, however, was no longer used after 1942, with the cars simply called Lincolns.

The idea of a smaller and more modern luxury car to fill the gap in Lincoln's traditional lineup was revisited in the 1950 Lincoln Lido (The Lido was the same size as other two-door Lincolns, though), 1977 Lincoln Versailles, 1982 Continental, and 2000 Lincoln LS.

The nameplate was used again for the 2006 Lincoln Zephyr, which was subsequently renamed the MKZ for model year 2007.

== Gallery ==
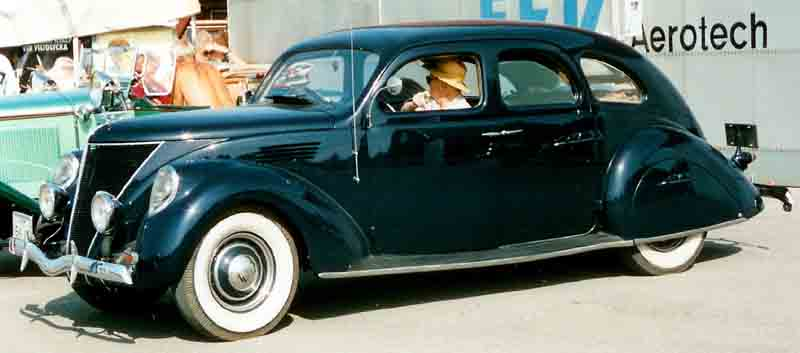
Lincoln-Zephyr V-12 four-door sedan 1936

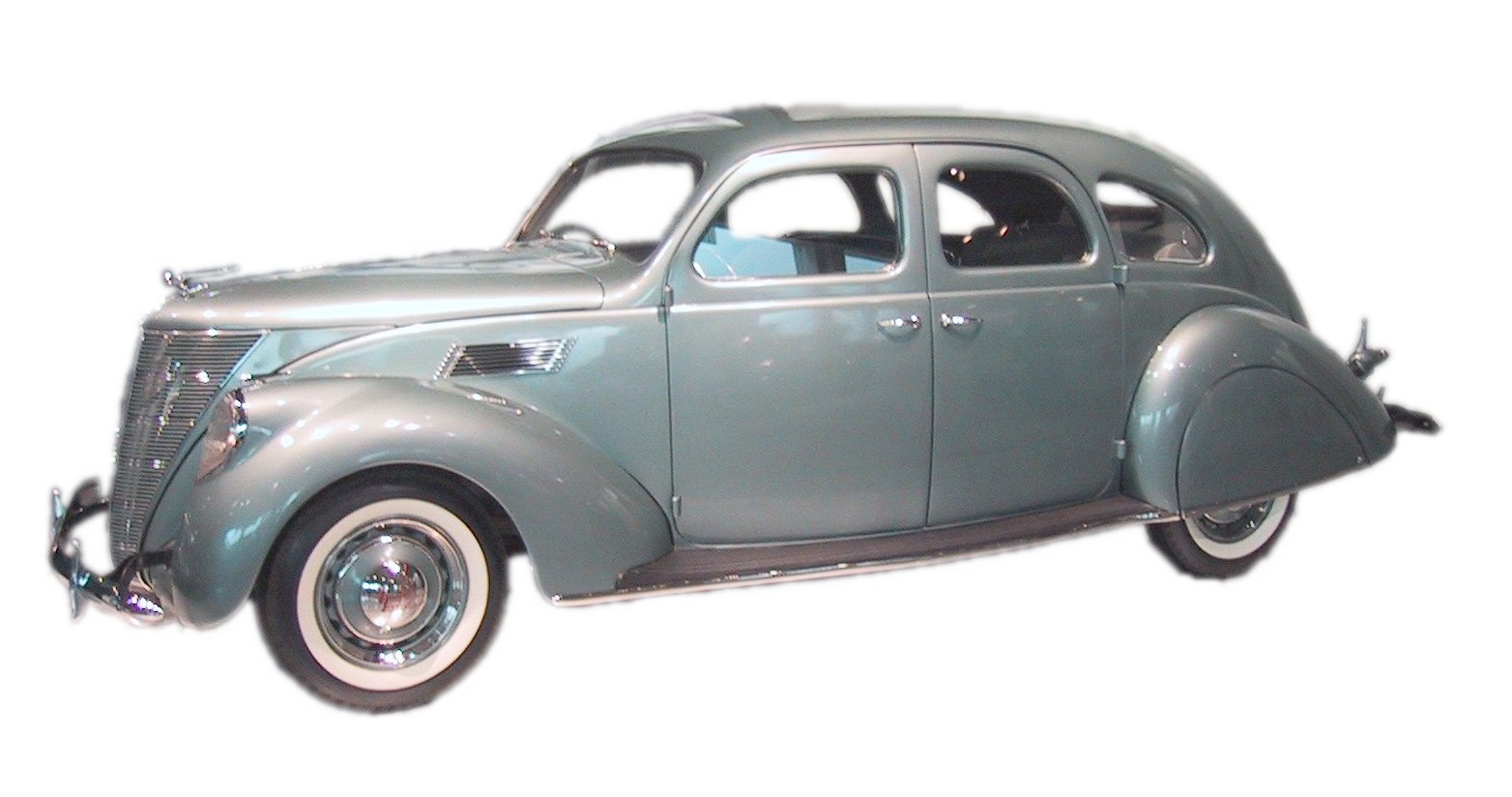
1937 Lincoln-Zephyr V-12 four-door sedan

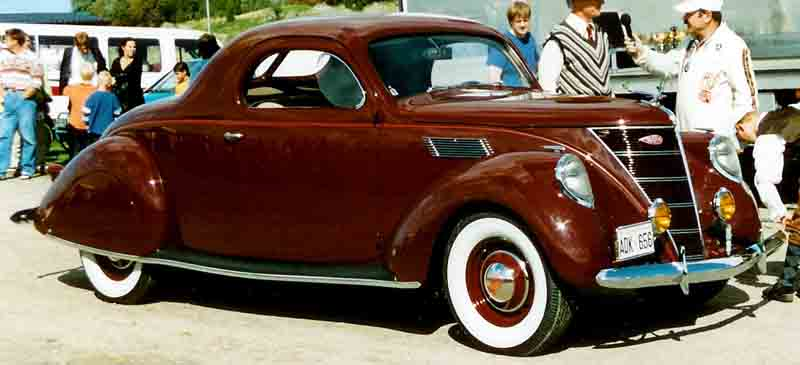
Lincoln-Zephyr V-12 coupe 1937

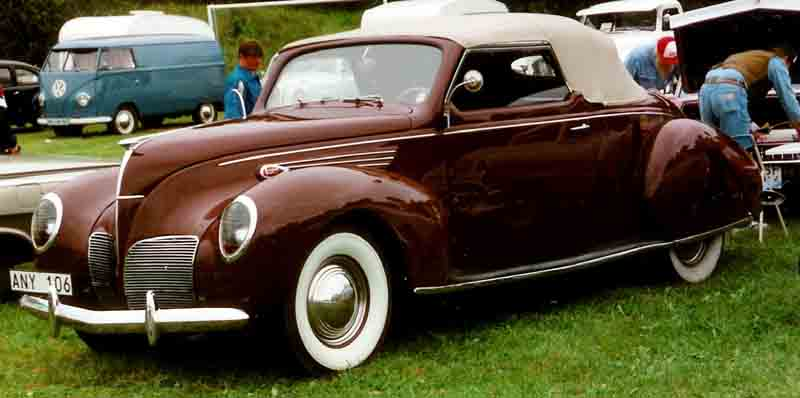
Lincoln-Zephyr V-12 convertible coupe 1938

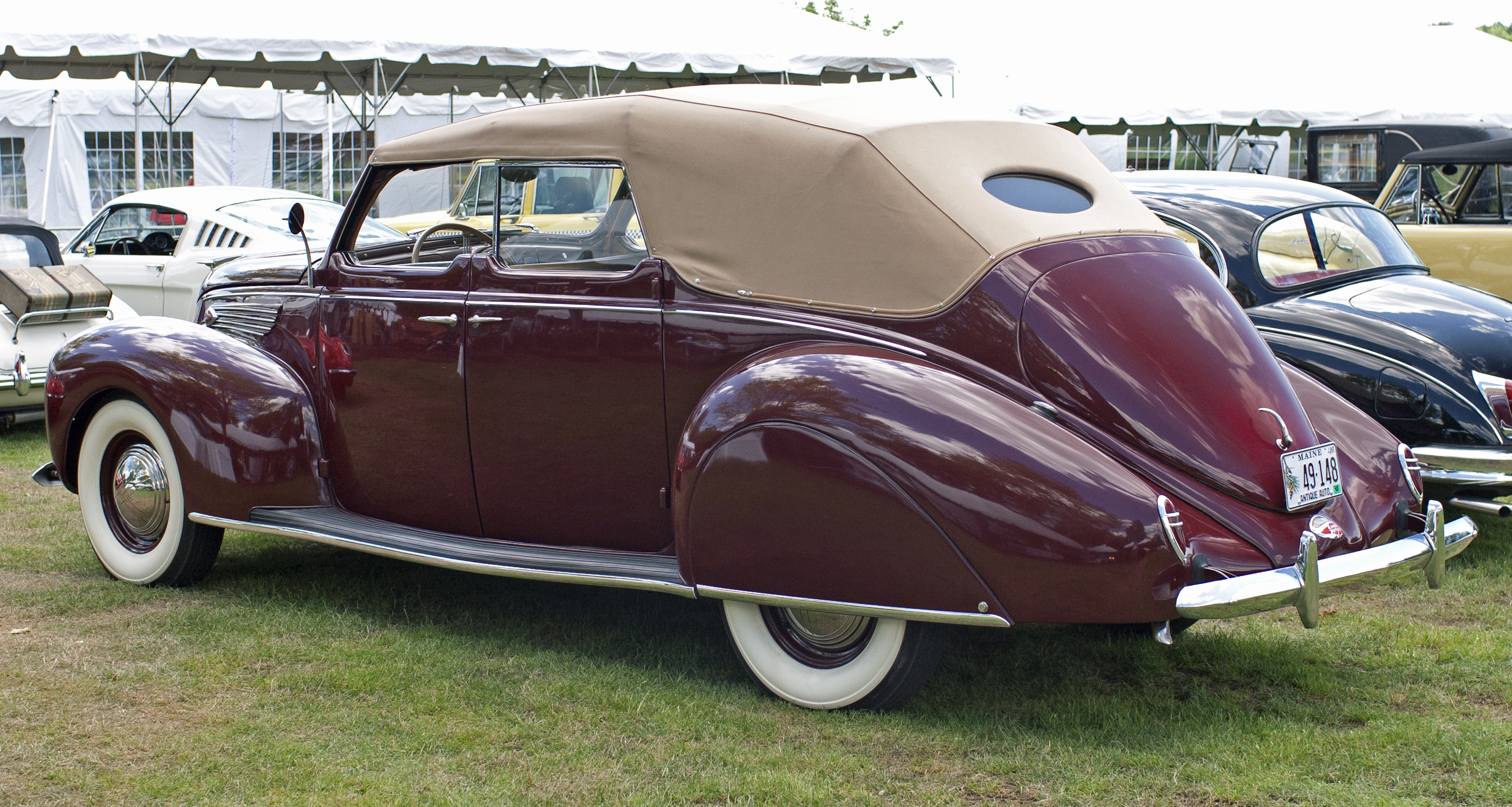
Lincoln-Zephyr V-12 convertible sedan 1938

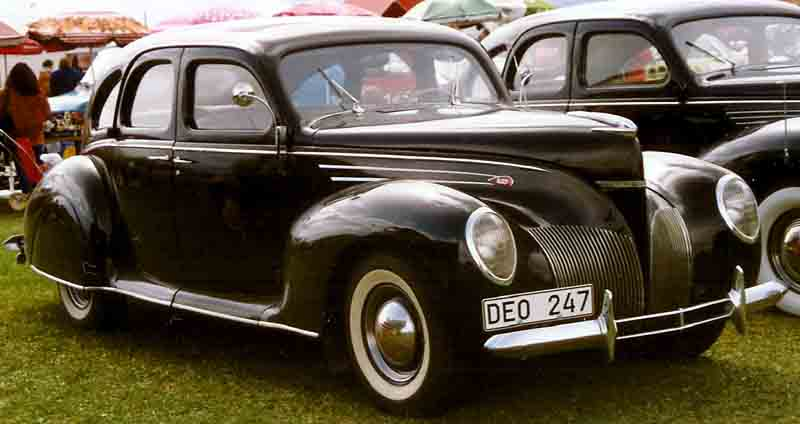
Lincoln-Zephyr V-12 four-door sedan 1939

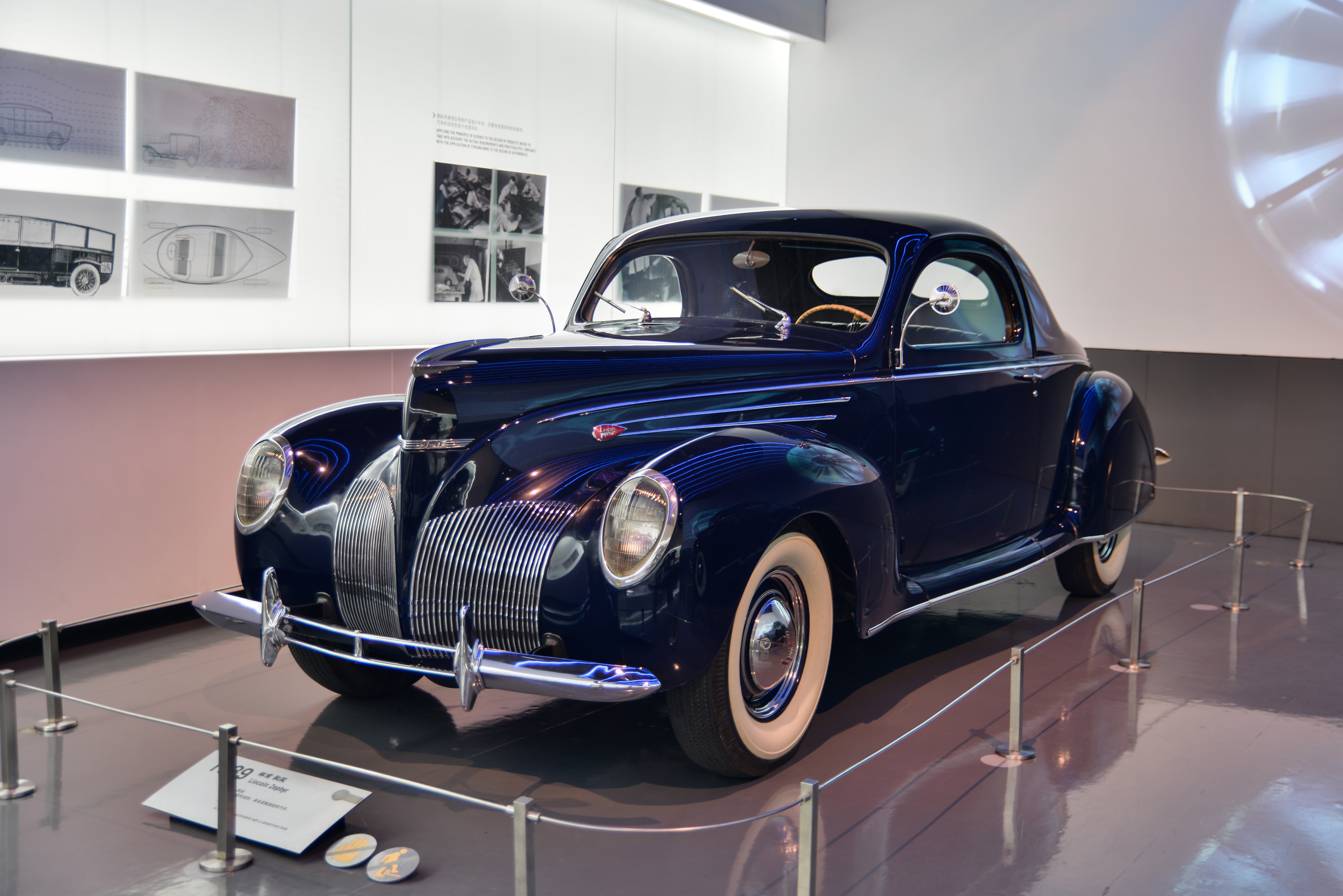
Lincoln-Zephyr 1939

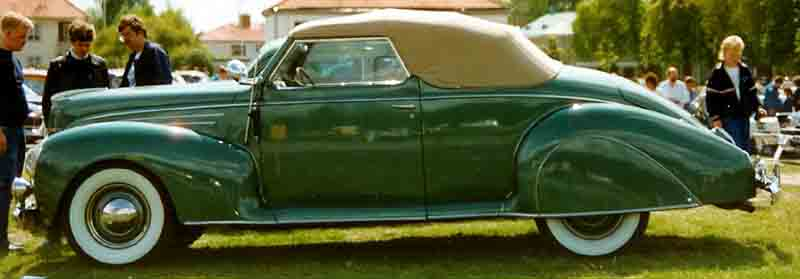
Lincoln-Zephyr V-12 convertible coupe 1939

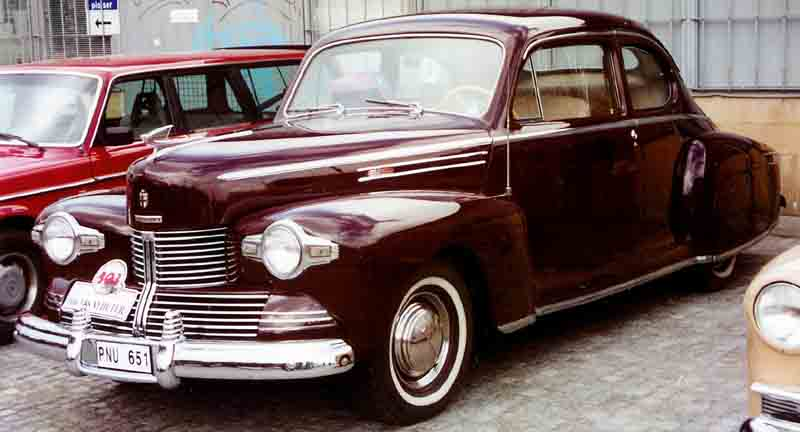
Lincoln Zephyr club coupe 1942

== Models ==
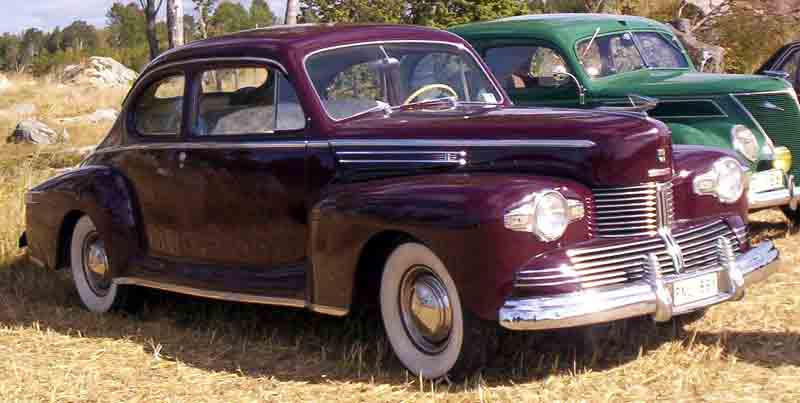
1942 Lincoln Zephyr coupe

The following were the Zephyr models for 1936 to 1940:

- Lincoln-Zephyr V-12 (1936–1940)
  - For 1936, available as two-door sedan or four-door sedan, a locking glove box was standard. Radio was optional. The turning radius was 22 feet (6.7 m). For 1937 the 2-door Sedan was renamed Coupe-Sedan, a Coupe (3-Window) was added along with a formal Town-Limousine. For 1938 a Convertible Coupe and a Convertible Sedan was added. For 1940 the Coupe-Sedan was replaced by the Club Coupe, the Convertible Sedan was discontinued. Trunk space was increased in 1940.
- Lincoln-Zephyr Continental (1940) was the first time the name Continental appeared on a car from Lincoln, as a model under Lincoln-Zephyr rather than a separate model. They were partially hand-built since dies for machine-pressing were not constructed until 1941. Production started on December 13, 1939, with the Continental Cabriolet, from June 1940 also available as Continental Club Coupe. Just 350 Cabriolets and 54 Club Coupes were built.

When the last Lincoln V-12 (Model K) had been delivered on January 24, 1940, the Lincoln Motor Company was soon to be transformed into Lincoln Division, effective on May 1, 1940, and for 1941 model year the Lincoln-Zephyr was no longer a separate marque. All 1941 models were Lincolns and the Zephyr-based Lincoln Custom replaced both the large Lincoln K-series cars and the Lincoln-Zephyr Town-Limousine. It also had full instrumentation.

=== Specifications ===
The Zephyr had been designed by John Tjaarda (1897–1962), who was fascinated with airplanes, resulting in unibody construction relatively light and rigid for its size and a drag coefficient of 0.45. Weight was 3,350 lb (1,520 kg).

The prewar Zephyr had been powered by a small 75° 292 cu in (4.8 L) flathead Lincoln-Zephyr V12 engine developed from Ford's Flathead V8 and unrelated to the larger K-series flathead Lincoln L-head V12 engines. The valve-in-block engine was quite compact, allowing a low hood. But like the V8 Fords of the era, the Zephyr V12 often suffered from hot spots due to exhaust passages through the cylinder block. In addition, the earliest Zephyrs suffered from poor oil pressure, resulting in upgrades to the oil pump.

The 1936 to 1939 models were 267 in³ (4.4 L) with hydraulic lifters added in 1938. The 1940 and 1941 cars used an enlarged 292-in³ (4.8-L) engine, while 1942 and early 1946 models used a 306-in³ (5.0-L), but lower compression ratio because of the iron heads. Late 1946 to 1948 Lincolns based on the Zephyr used a 292-in³ engine.

The original engine had 110 hp (82 kW) and gave the car a top speed of 90 mph (145 km/h). Suspension was Henry Ford-era transverse springs front and rear, with dead axle front and torque tube rear, already quite outdated when the car was introduced. Brakes were cable-activated for 1936 to 1938; 1939 and onwards were hydraulic. 1939 was also the first year for synchromesh in the 3-speed transmission, and the last year for a floor-mounted gearshift lever as beginning in 1940 the lever was mounted on the steering column. The Zephyr was the first Ford product to have an all-steel roof, except the late 1931 Model AA truck.

=== Heritage models ===
The following Lincoln-Zephyr heritage models were sold under the Lincoln name after Lincoln-Zephyr was merged into the Lincoln marque for the 1941 model year:

- Lincoln Zephyr V-12 (1941–1942) Both years available as Sedan, Coupe, Club Coupe and Convertible Coupe
- Lincoln Custom (1941–1942) Sedan and Limousine, some with blinded quarter roof option
- Lincoln Continental (1941–1948) Cabriolet and Coupe

The following Lincoln models derived from the Zephyr were sold after World War II:

- Lincoln (1946–1948), or H-series

== H-series Lincolns ==
Lincoln H-series
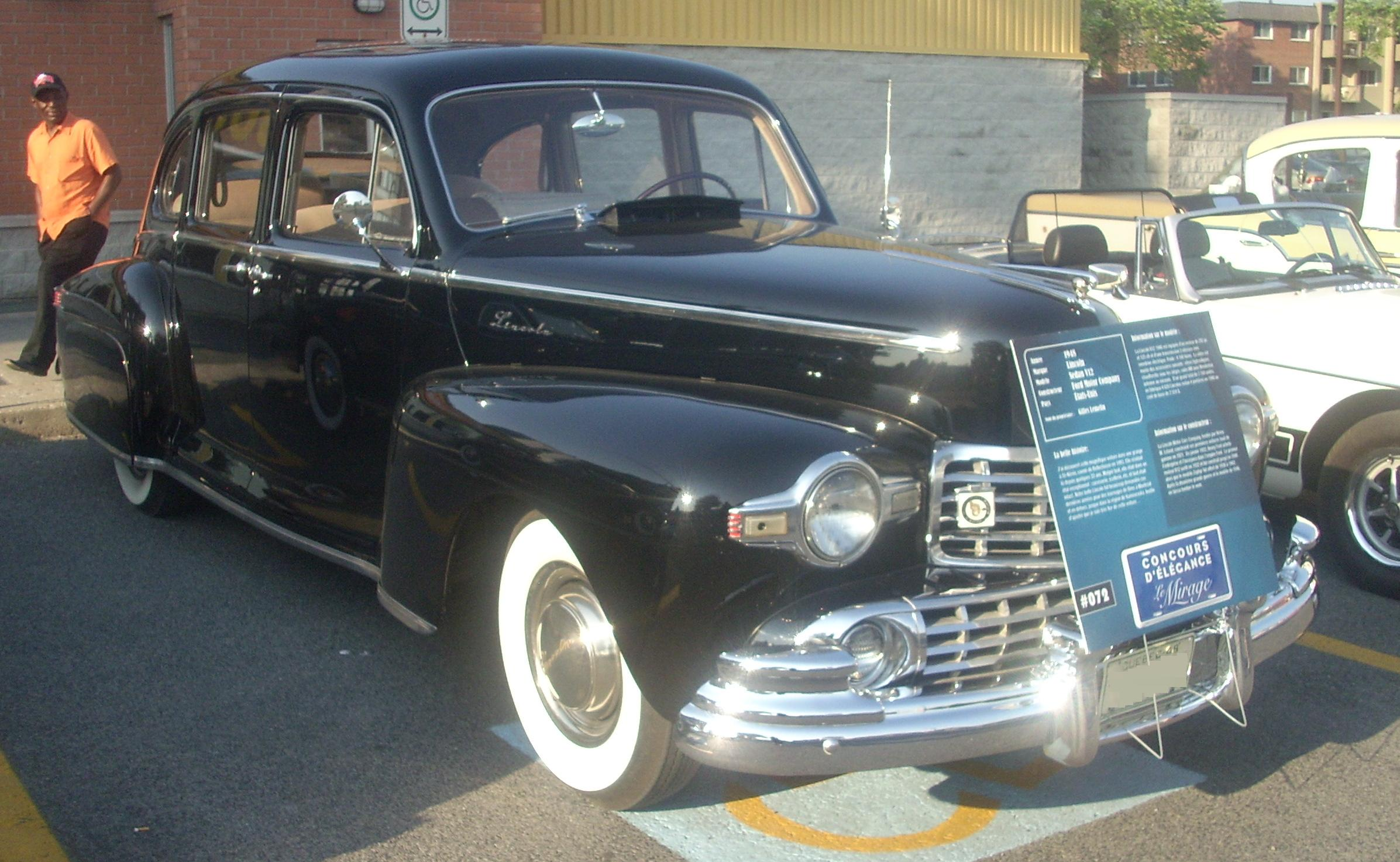
- 1948 Lincoln Sedan Style 73

Overview
- Manufacturer: Lincoln (Ford)
- Also called: Lincoln
- Production: 1946–1948
- Assembly: Lincoln Assembly, Detroit, Michigan

Body and chassis
- Class: Full-size luxury car
- Body style: 2-door coupe 2-door convertible 4 door sedan

Powertrain
- Engine: 292CID 2-bbl. 130hp V12

Dimensions
- Wheelbase: 125 in (3,175 mm)
- Length: 218 in (5,537 mm)
- Width: 77.8 in (1,976 mm)
- Height: 68.5 in (1,740 mm)

Chronology
- Predecessor: Lincoln Zephyr
- Successor: Lincoln EL-series

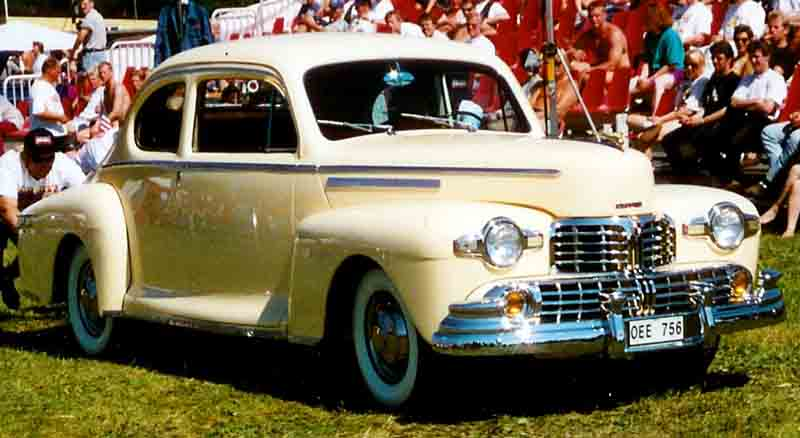
1946 Lincoln Club Coupe Style 77

When Lincoln resumed production after World War II the Zephyr name was dropped and full-size Lincolns were sold during the 1946-1948 model years without a unique model name, known instead by their body styles - Sedan, Club Coupe, or Convertible Coupe. For identification purposes, they are typically referred to as the Lincoln H-series, while the approach of offering a luxuriously equipped vehicle in a smaller size had been ceded to the then all-new Mercury in 1938.

The full-sized Lincolns' appearance was very similar to the contemporaneous Lincoln Continental coupe and convertible. An electric clock was standard. This series of vehicles continued to use the 292 in³ (4.8 L) 65° L-head Lincoln V12 engine. The four-door sedan Style 73 with the Custom-spec interior was listed at US$2,486 ($41,044 in 2025 dollars).

== See also ==
- Ford Zephyr
- Mercury Zephyr
- Lincoln MKZ
