= Maywood Assembly =

Former Ford assembly plant in Commerce, California, USA

Coordinates: 33.9851°N 118.1625°W

Maywood Assembly, also known as Los Angeles No. 1, was a Ford Motor Company assembly plant located in Commerce, California, United States.

== History ==
The plant was in operation from 1948 until August 1957. During this time period Maywood/Los Angeles assembled both Mercury and Lincoln branded vehicles (Lincoln-Mercury Division of Ford Motor Company). Mercury was produced from 1948 to 1957, Lincoln from 1949 to 1956. In 1955 it was deemed that the Maywood plant's facilities were not sufficient for the increased amount of production being called on by the demand for new cars on the West Coast of the United States. A new location was selected in nearby Pico Rivera, California and designated as Los Angeles #2. It started operation at the start of August 1957 but, due to its unfinished paint booths, the Maywood plant remained in operation so that Edsel bodies could be sent over from Los Angeles #2 and painted, then trucked back where they were trimmed out and final assembly would take place. In late August 1957 all operations ceased at Los Angeles #1.

The plant's address was 5801 South Eastern Avenue, in Commerce near Maywood. It was across the street from the Chrysler Los Angeles Assembly plant.

The factory was closed and demolished when operations at both the Maywood Assembly and Long Beach Assembly were combined in the new Los Angeles Assembly factory in Pico Rivera, California, which opened in the summer of 1957.

=== Models assembled ===
Models produced at Maywood Assembly include:

- Lincoln Capri
- Lincoln Cosmopolitan
- Lincoln EL-series
- Mercury Eight
- Mercury Montclair
- Mercury Monterey

== See also ==
- Ford Long Beach Assembly Plant
- Ford Motor Company Assembly Plant — located in Richmond, Bay Area, Northern California.
