= Long Beach Assembly =

Long Beach Assembly is a former Ford Motor Company assembly plant located at the Cerritos Channel on Terminal Island, at 700 Henry Ford Avenue in Long Beach, Southern California. It operated from 1930 through 1958.

The former Henry Ford Bridge, crossing the Cerritos Channel from the mainland to Terminal Island, was located near the former plant site.

== History ==
The Ford Model A were the first vehicles to be built, with operations beginning in March, 1930. The location ceased production of the 1959 Fords on March 20, 1959. when underground subsidence caused by oil drilling left the facility unstable. The Los Angeles Assembly plant #2 had opened in Pico Rivera in August 1957 producing first the Edsel and in mid-September 1957, the Mercury. 1959 Ford car production resumed at Pico Rivera on April 10, 1959.

The location was one of several factories designed by architect Albert Kahn who was the chief architect for Ford factories across the US. Through 1948, the location built Lincoln, Mercury and Ford products that were distributed throughout the American Southwest. In 1948 a Lincoln-Mercury plant opened in Maywood, called Maywood Assembly.

During the Depression of the 1930s, the Long Beach Assembly plant manufactured trucks that were used to build Hoover Dam. The facility was briefly closed from December 1932 until February 1935.

During WWII the location was used as a supply base by the United States Army Air Corps, with automobile production resuming in December, 1945.

Ford closed earlier Los Angeles Assembly plants that had been operating since 1911: first, at 12th and Olive Streets and after 1914, at East Seventh Street and Santa Fe Avenue. The factory that built Ford Model T and Model A is still standing, and since 2019 has been the home of Warner Bros. Records.

== Gallery ==
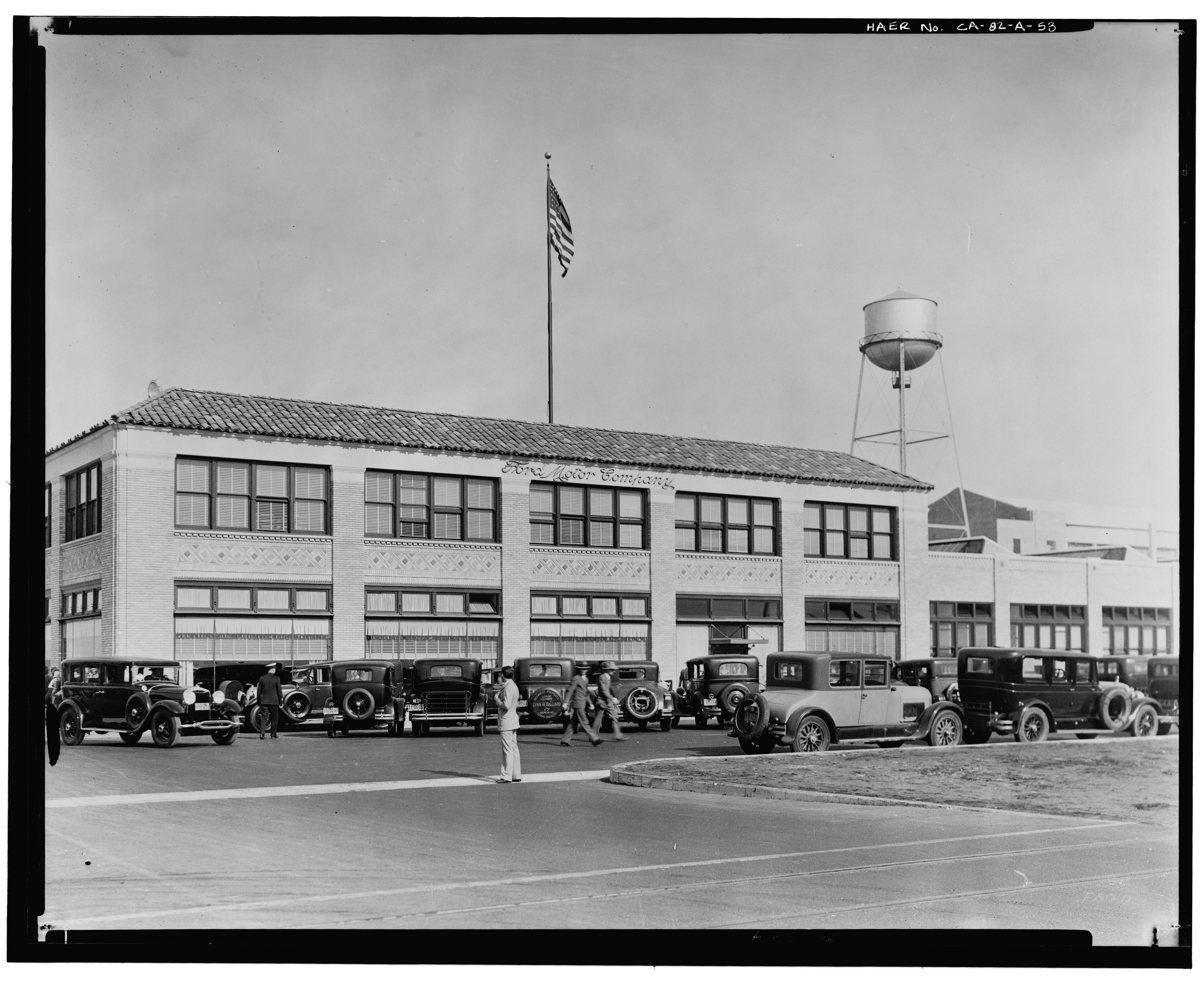
Opening day, 1930

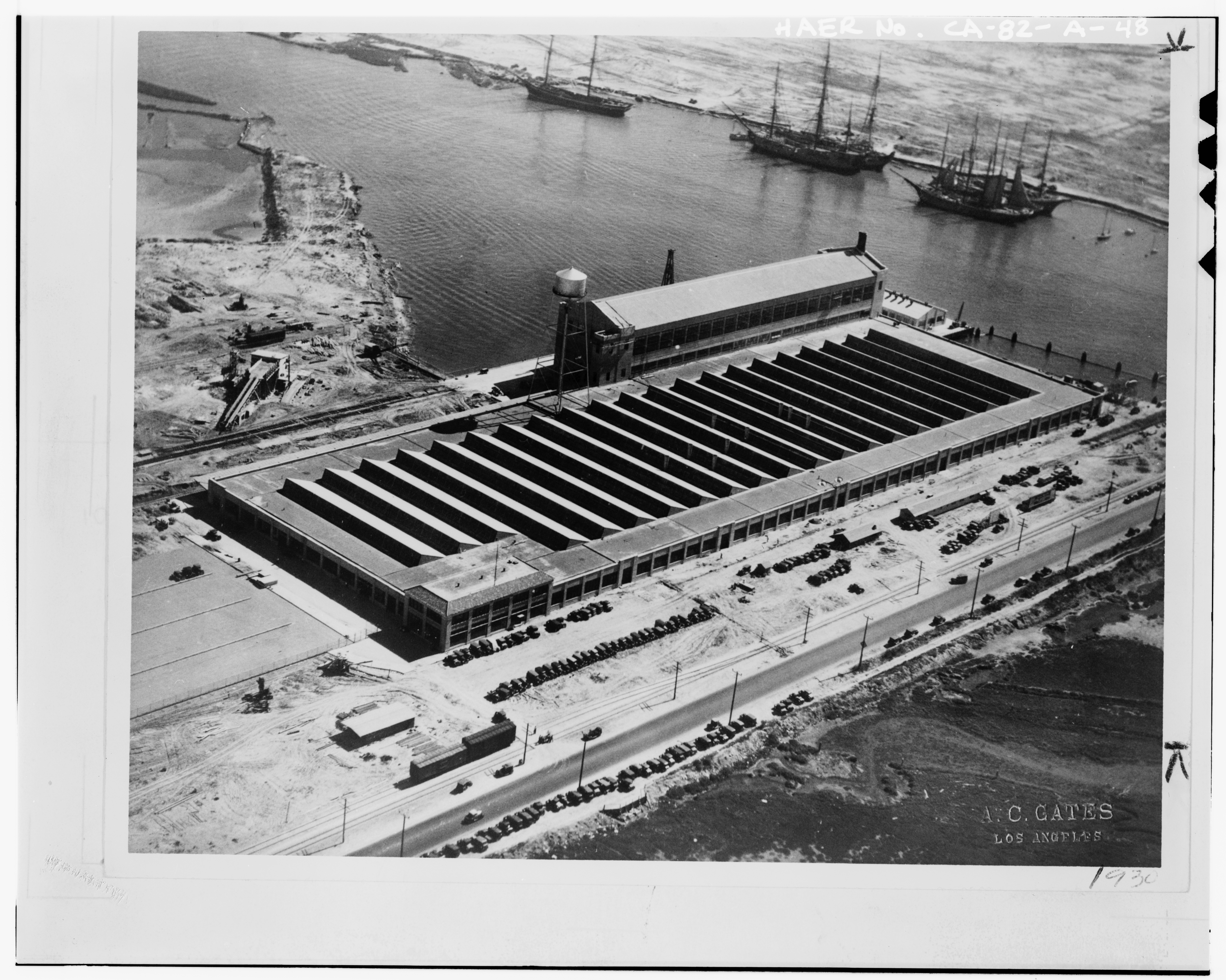
Aerial view of the plant, c. 1930

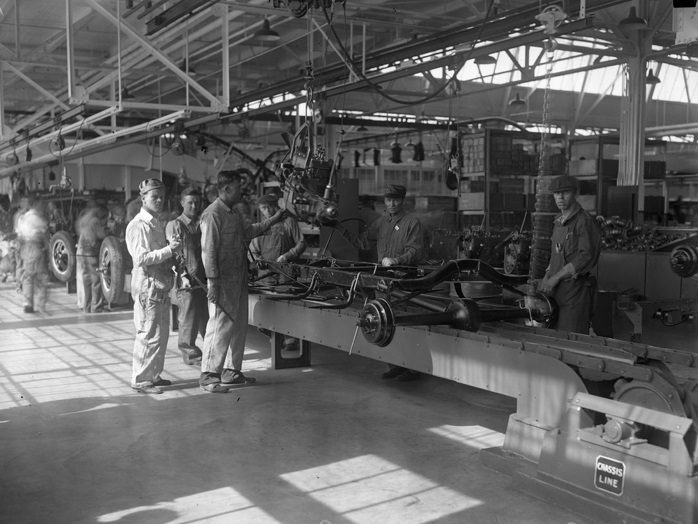
1930

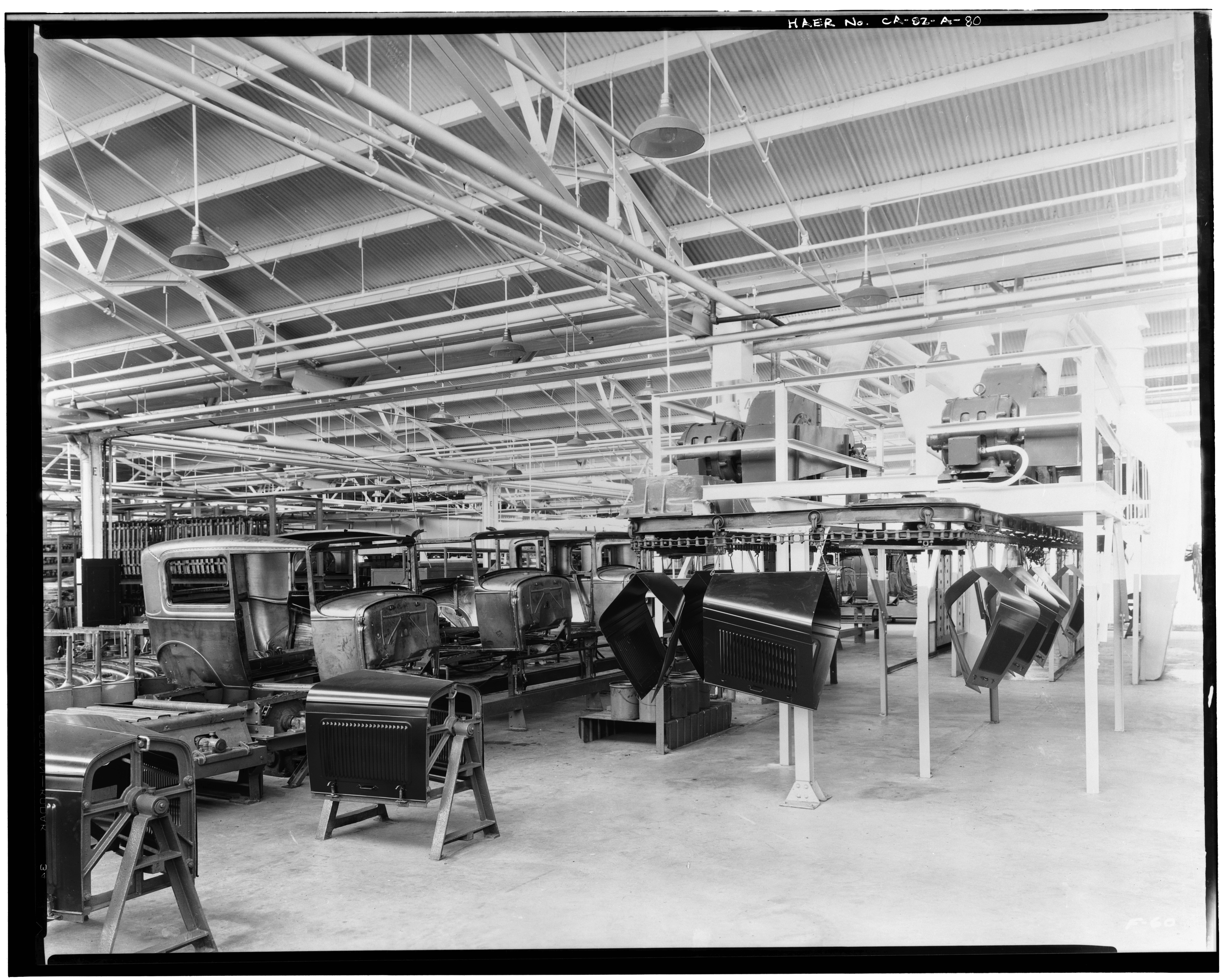
Hood conveyor, April 13, 1930

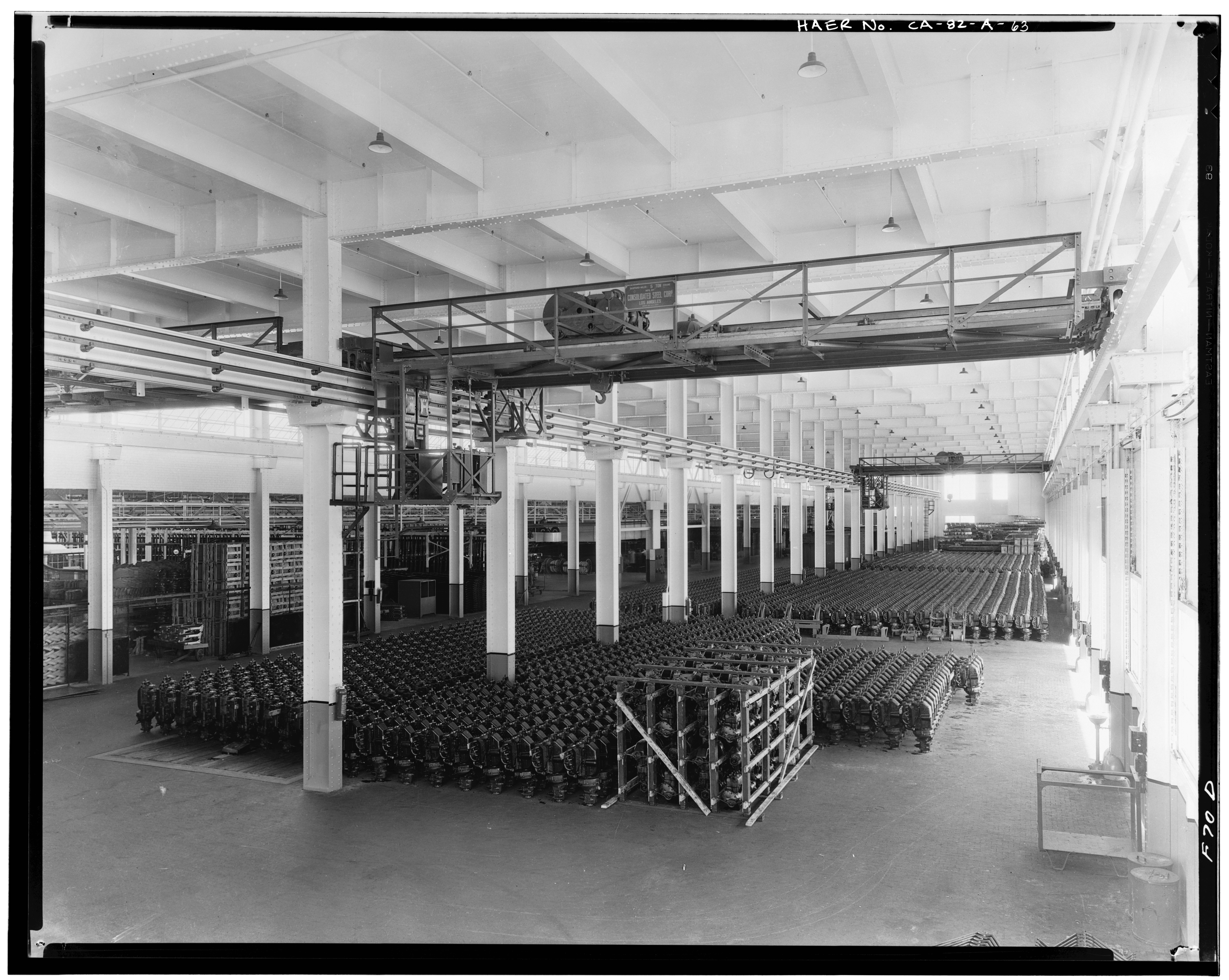
Engine storage, April 13, 1930

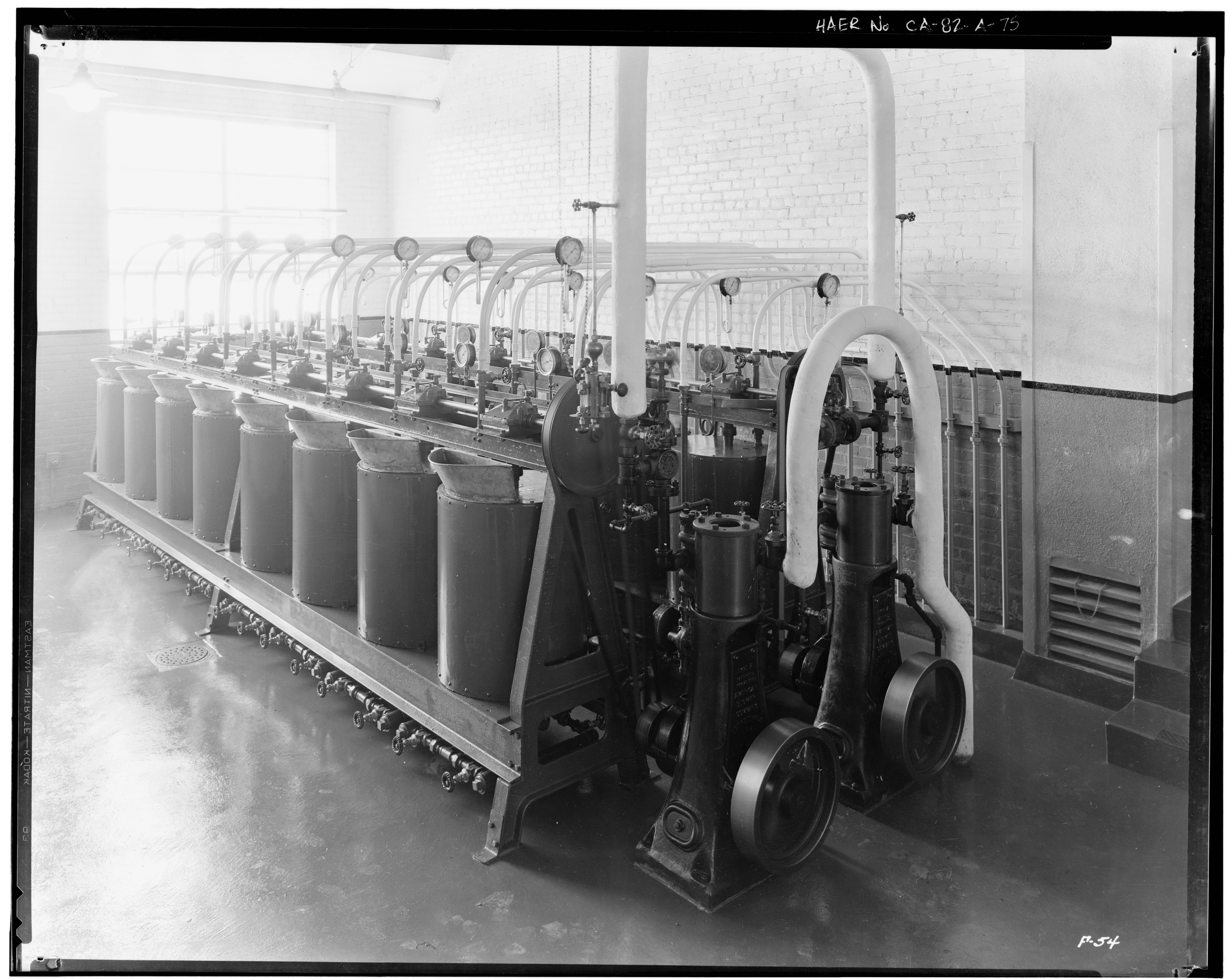
Paint circulating system

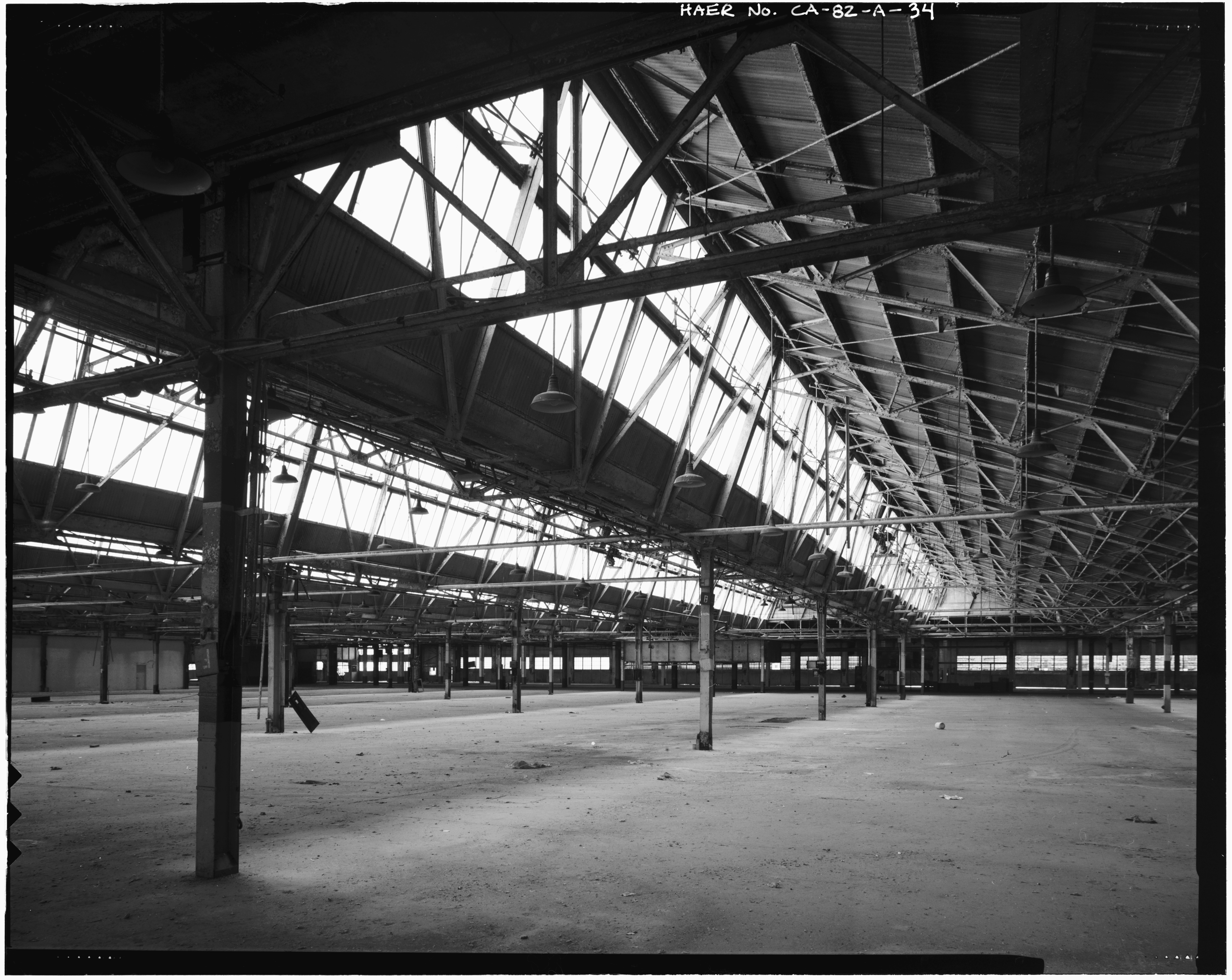
Overall view to east-northeast of assembly area

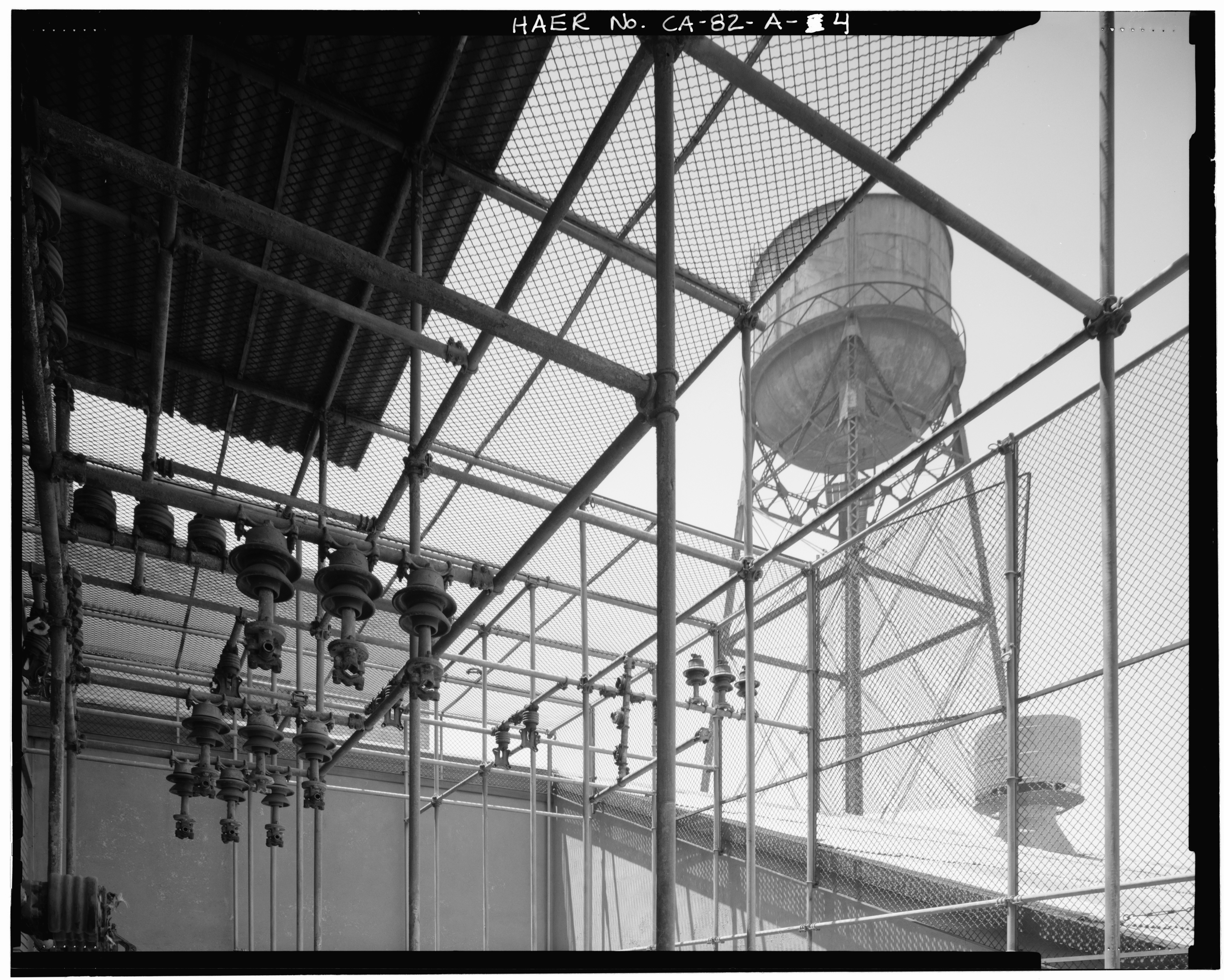
Water tower and electrical transformer cage

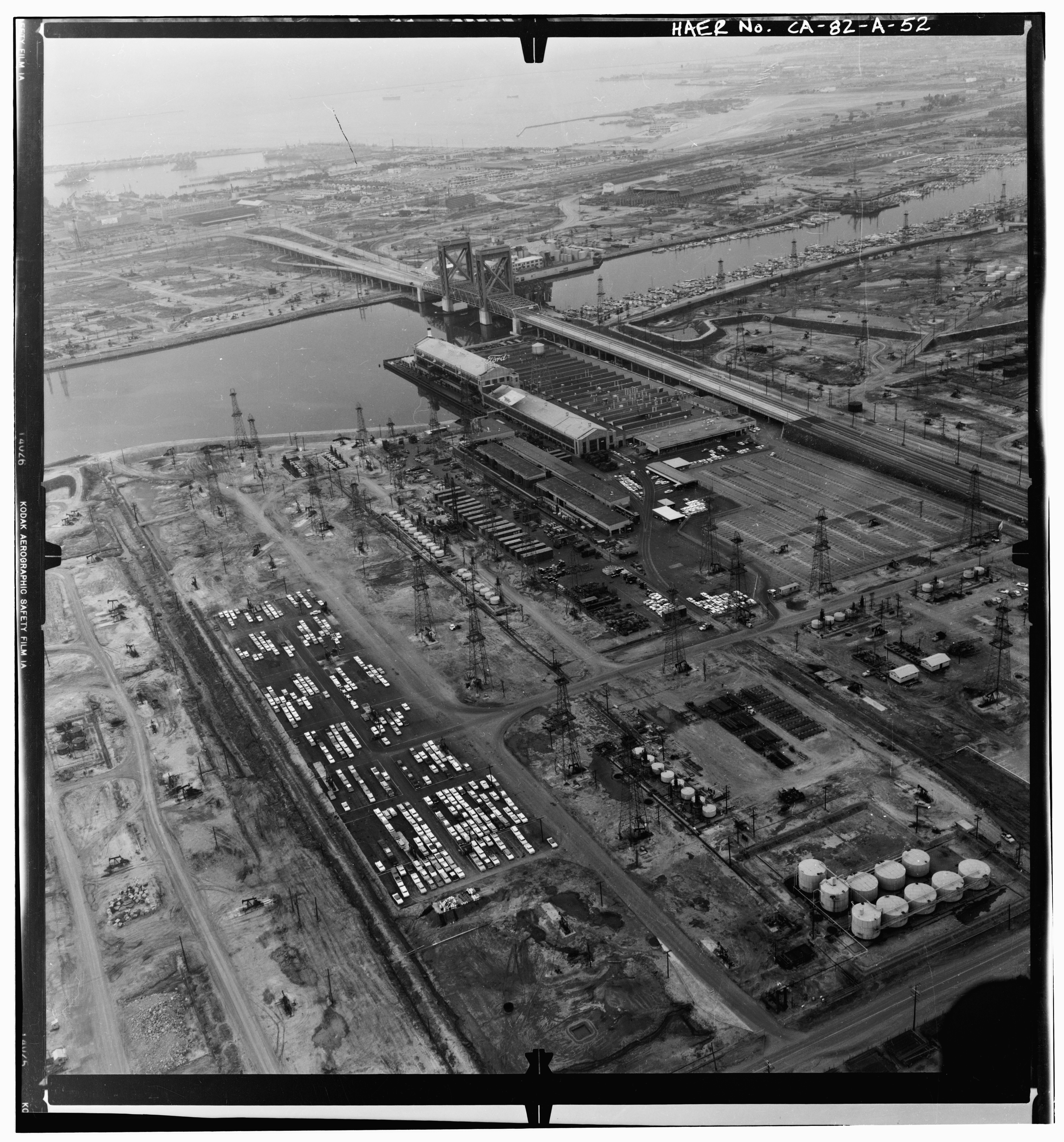
Aerial view of plant and Commodore Schuyler F. Heim Bridge, ca. 1950s

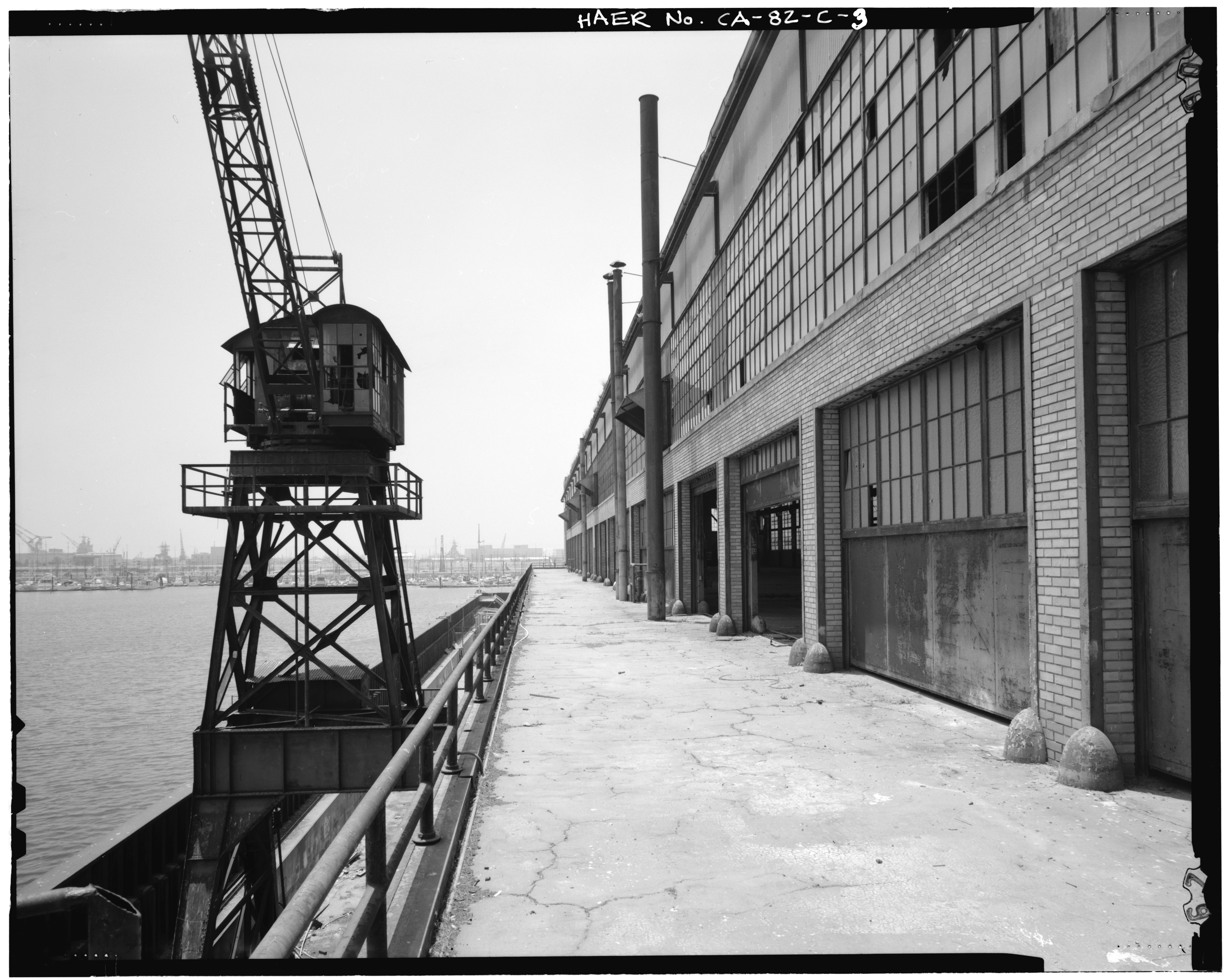
Second floor deck
