= Lincoln Zephyr =

Lincoln Zephyr is a name used on various different Lincoln vehicles.

- Lincoln-Zephyr, a 1936–1942 line of mid-size luxury cars
- Lincoln MKZ, a 2006–2020 mid-size sedan sold as the Zephyr for 2006
- Lincoln Zephyr, a 2022–present mid-size sedan built by Changan Ford, known in Chinese as the 'Z'
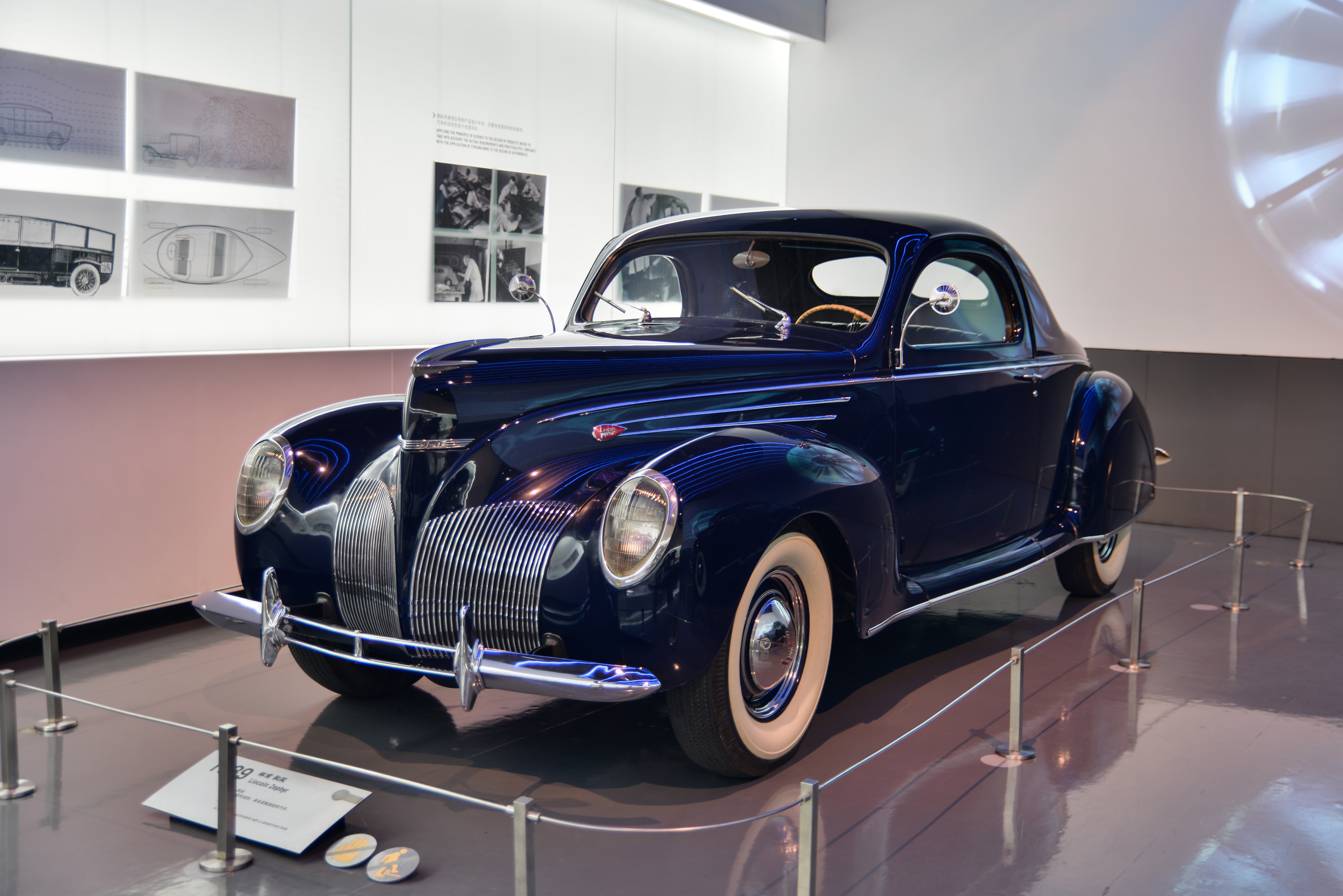
1936–1942 Lincoln-Zephyr

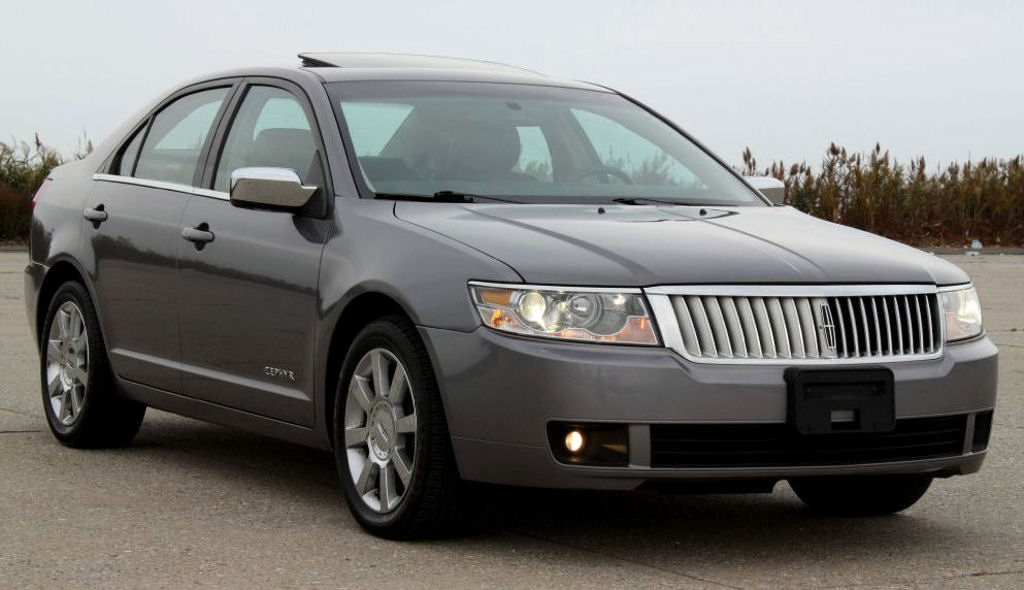
2005–2006 Lincoln Zephyr

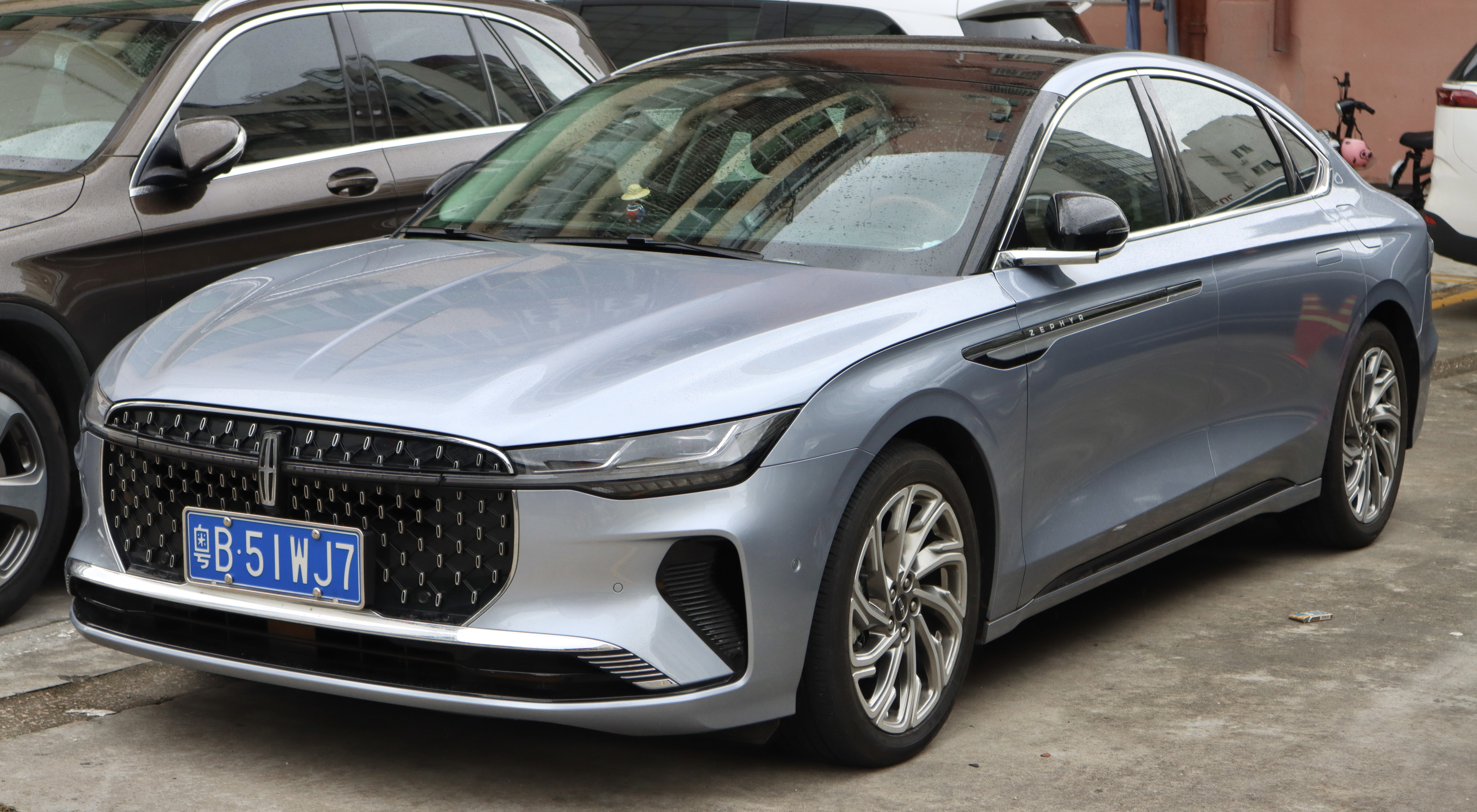
2022–present Lincoln Zephyr (Z in Chinese)

== See also ==
- Lincoln-Zephyr V12 engine, a 1936–1948 series of engines
