= Lincoln Motor Company Plant =

- U.S. National Register of Historic Places
- Former U.S. National Historic Landmark
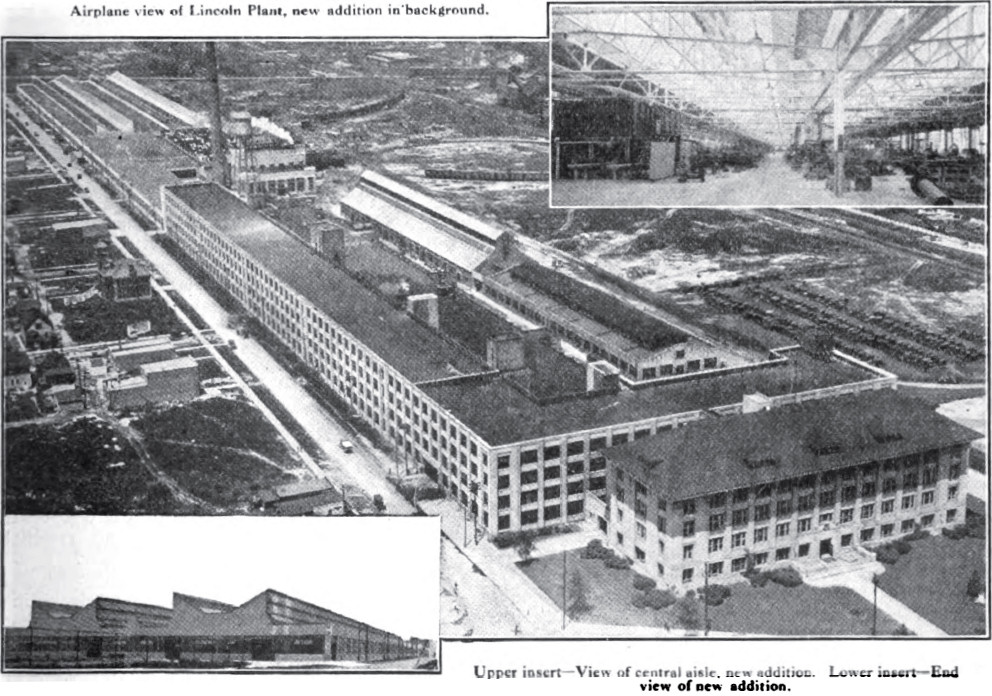
- Lincoln plant in 1923, showing newer Ford-built addition in rear

- Location within Michigan Location within the United States
- Interactive map
- Location: 6200 W. Warren Ave., Detroit, Michigan
- Coordinates: 42°20′44″N 83°7′46″W
- Area: 62 acres (25 ha)
- Built: 1917
- Built by: Walbridge-Aldinger Co.
- Architect: George D. Mason, Albert Kahn
- NRHP reference No.: 78001521

Significant dates
- Added to NRHP: June 2, 1978
- Designated NHL: June 2, 1978
- Delisted NHL: April 4, 2005

The Lincoln Motor Company Plant was an automotive plant at Livernois, 6200 West Warren Avenue Detroit, Michigan, later known as the Detroit Edison Warren Service Center. The complex was designated a National Historic Landmark in 1978, due to its historic association with World War I Liberty engines and the Lincoln Motor Company. However, the main structures were demolished in 2003 and NHL designation was withdrawn in 2005.

== Henry Leland's Lincoln ==
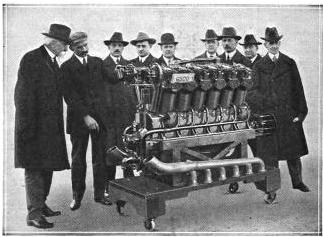
The 6500th Lincoln Liberty Aircraft Engine produced in the plant; Henry Leland and his son Wilfred Leland are on left

Beginning in 1902, Henry Leland steered Cadillac to become a popular, high quality luxury automobile brand. Leland sold the company to General Motors in 1908, but continued his association with Cadillac until the mid-1910s, when he resigned because of the company's unwillingness to transition to World War I wartime production needs.

In 1917, Leland established the Lincoln Motor Company to build Liberty engines for fighter planes using Ford Motor Company-supplied cylinders. Leland immediately purchased the former Warren Motor Car Company factory on Detroit's west side. However, he quickly realized the facilities were not sufficient to house the engine production envisioned, so he purchased a 50-acre plot of land at Warren and Livernois. The company immediately broke ground for a factory complex of over 600,000 square feet (56,000 m^{2}), hiring architect George D. Mason to design the new buildings and the firm of Walbridge-Aldinger to build them. By the end of the war, the plant complex contained the Administration Building and Garage (Building A), the machine shop (Building B), the main Factories (Buildings C and D), a power house, a heat treatment plant, a motor testing building, and other minor structures.

In January 1919, after producing 6500 Liberty engines, manufacturing operations were suspended, and the war was soon over. Lincoln considered manufacturing automobile engines for other nameplates in the postwar years, but soon opted to convert to the production of luxury automobiles. However, production delays and the postwar recession of 1920 hurt sales, and the company eventually went into receivership.

== Early images of the Lincoln Plant interior ==
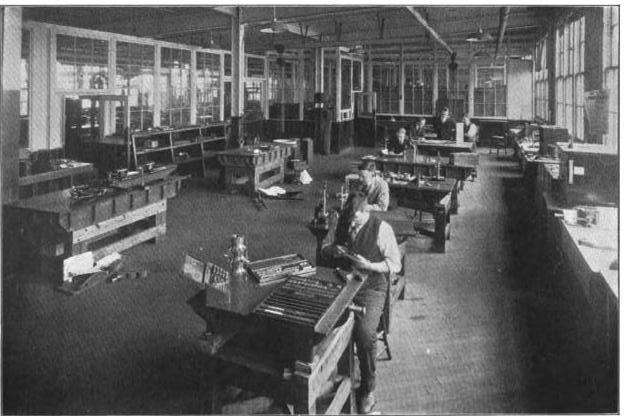
Dimensional Control Center

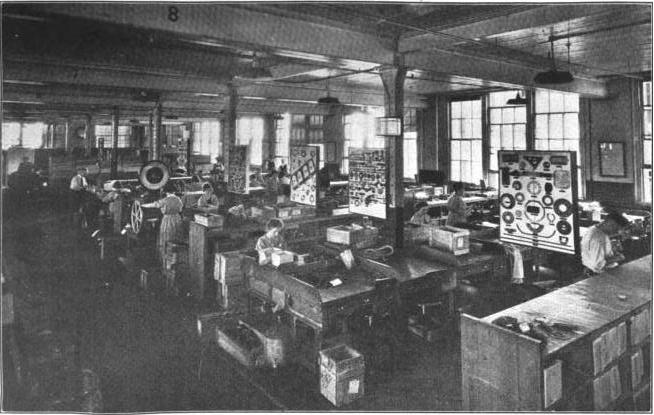
Inspection Room

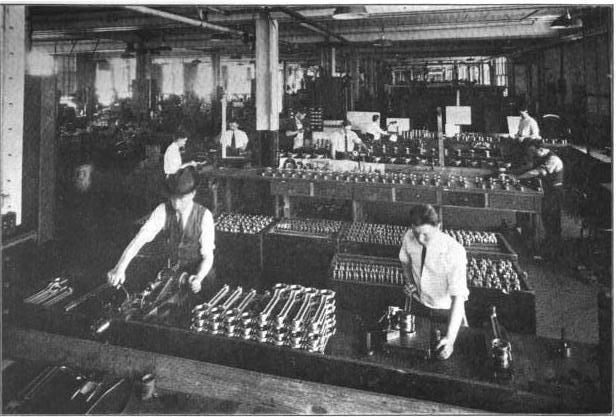
Inspection Point

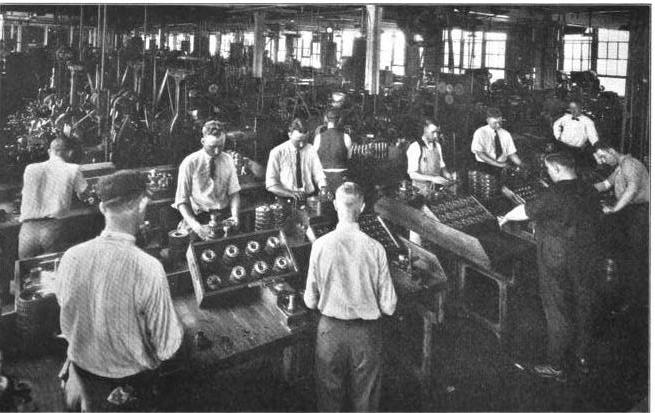
Gear Inspection

== Henry Ford's Lincoln ==
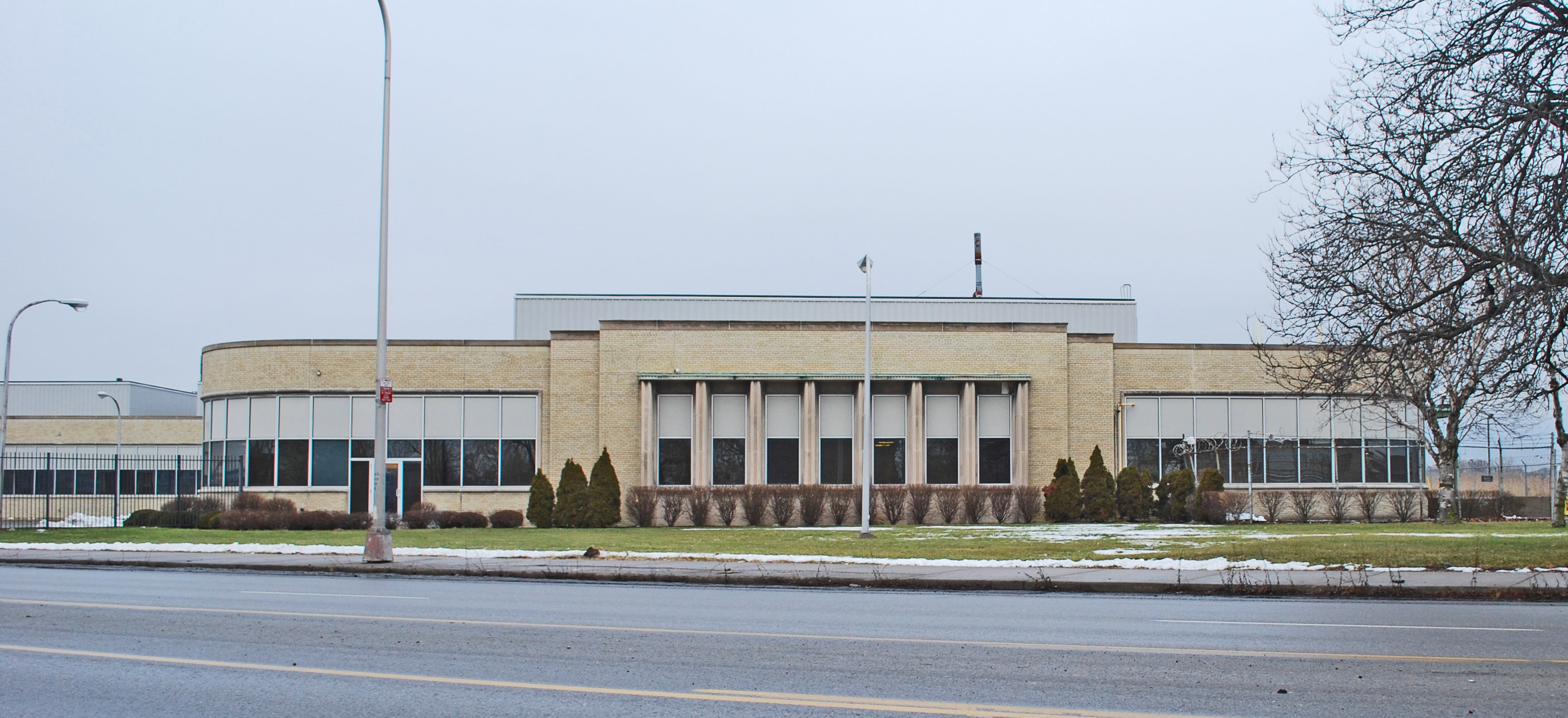
A remnant of the Lincoln Plant Complex: A Building on Warren in 2010

In 1922, Henry Ford purchased the company for $8,000,000, turning the Lincoln into Ford Motor Company's luxury brand. Leland retained his management post after the sale, but the strong-willed Leland and Ford immediately clashed, and Leland resigned after a few months. Ford immediately began refurbishing the plant layout and manufacturing. Ford also added onto the size of the complex, hiring architect Albert Kahn to design some of the many buildings along Livernois, adding over 300,000 square feet (28,000 m^{2}) to the plant. The Lincoln Zephyr and Lincoln Continental were made in the factory until 1952, when production facilities were moved to Wayne, Michigan The new Wixom plant opened in the fall of 1957.

== The Lincoln Plant after automobiles ==
Ford kept some offices in the plant, and leased out portions to other companies after manufacturing operations were relocated to the new Wixom Assembly Plant . In 1955, Detroit Edison bought the complex for $4,500,000, renaming it the Detroit Edison Warren Service Center. The company consolidated many of its services into the facility, but later used it primarily as a storage yard.

In recognition of its importance in automotive history, the Lincoln Motor Company Plant was designated a National Historic Landmark on June 2, 1978. However, nearly all of the plant buildings were demolished in December 2002 and January 2003, including the main Buildings A, B, C, and D. A small portion of the Factory G was retained, as well as other scattered support structures; however, because of the substantial loss of historic integrity the plant's National Historic Landmark designation was withdrawn on April 4, 2005.

Building H, located along Warren Ave adjacent to the former Building A, was demolished in 2020. DTE Energy currently uses the Warren Service Center site as the location of its main distribution warehouse, fabrication shops and equipment storage.

The Lincoln Plant Location 2010
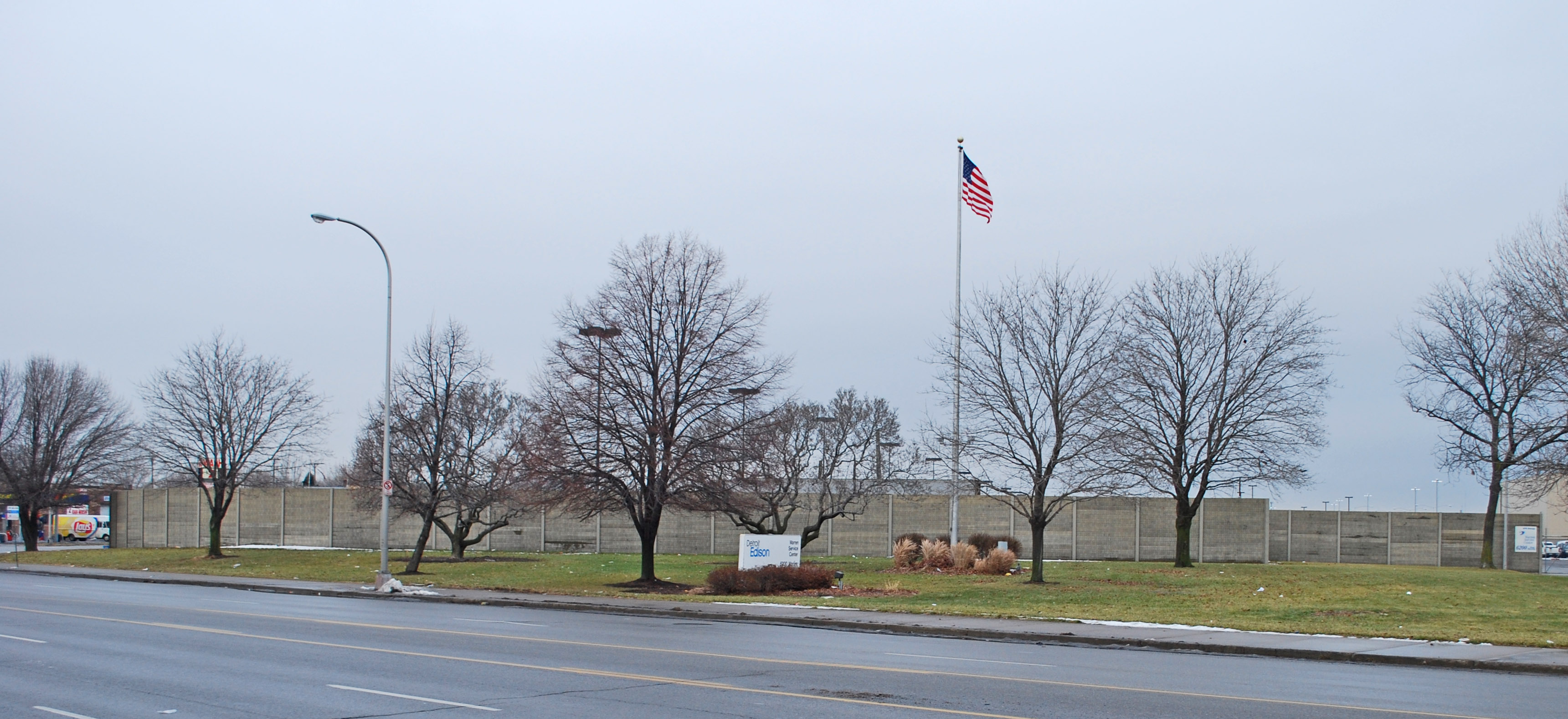
Former location of Administration Building on Warren and Livernois

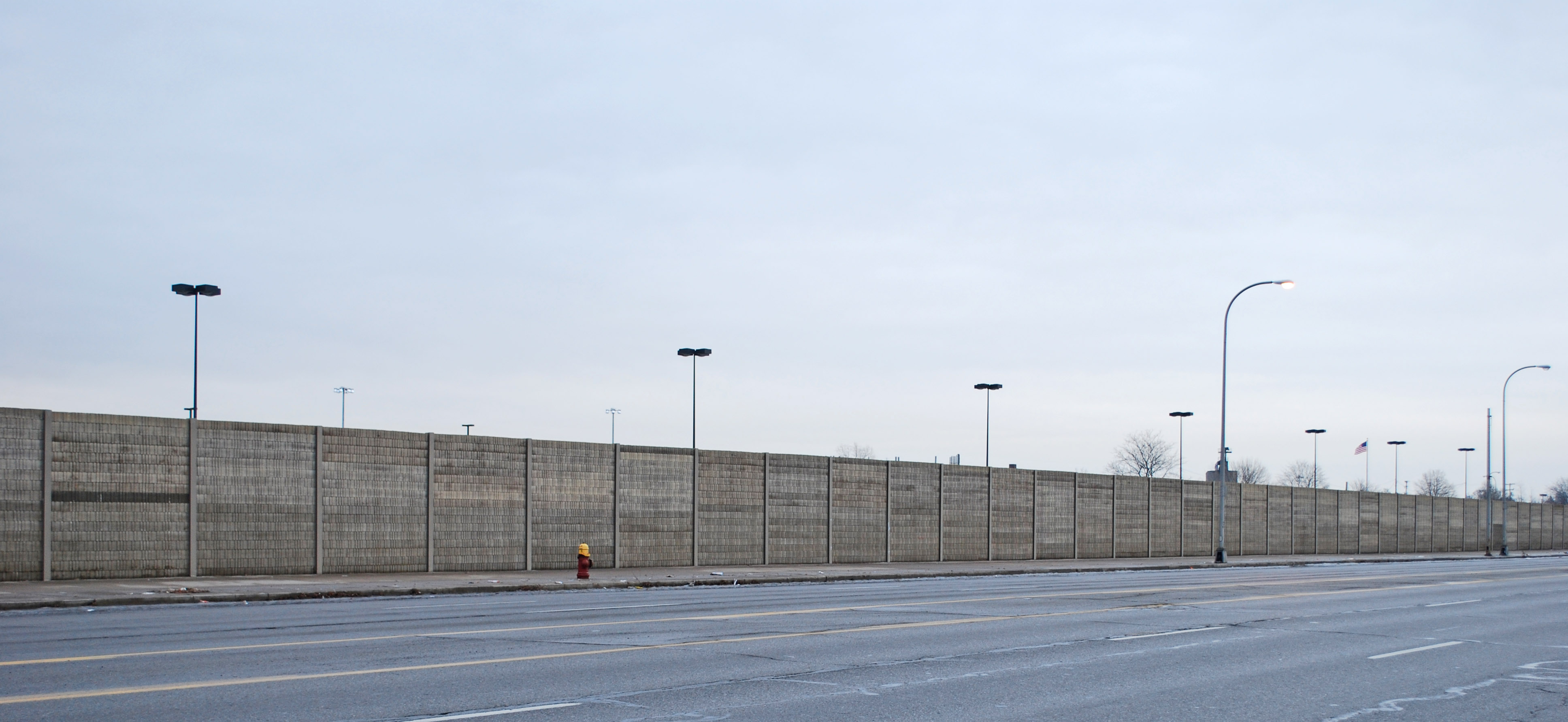
Former location of factory on Livernois

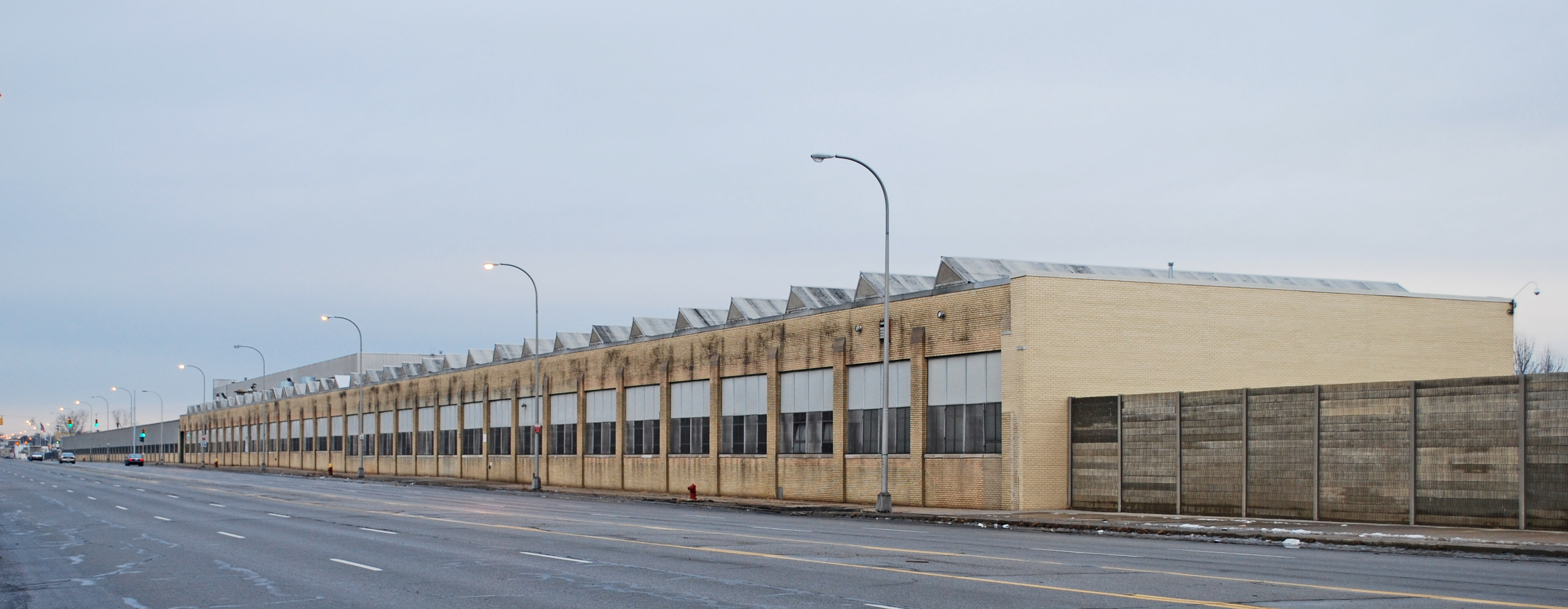
Ford-built factory additions on Livernois, north end of property

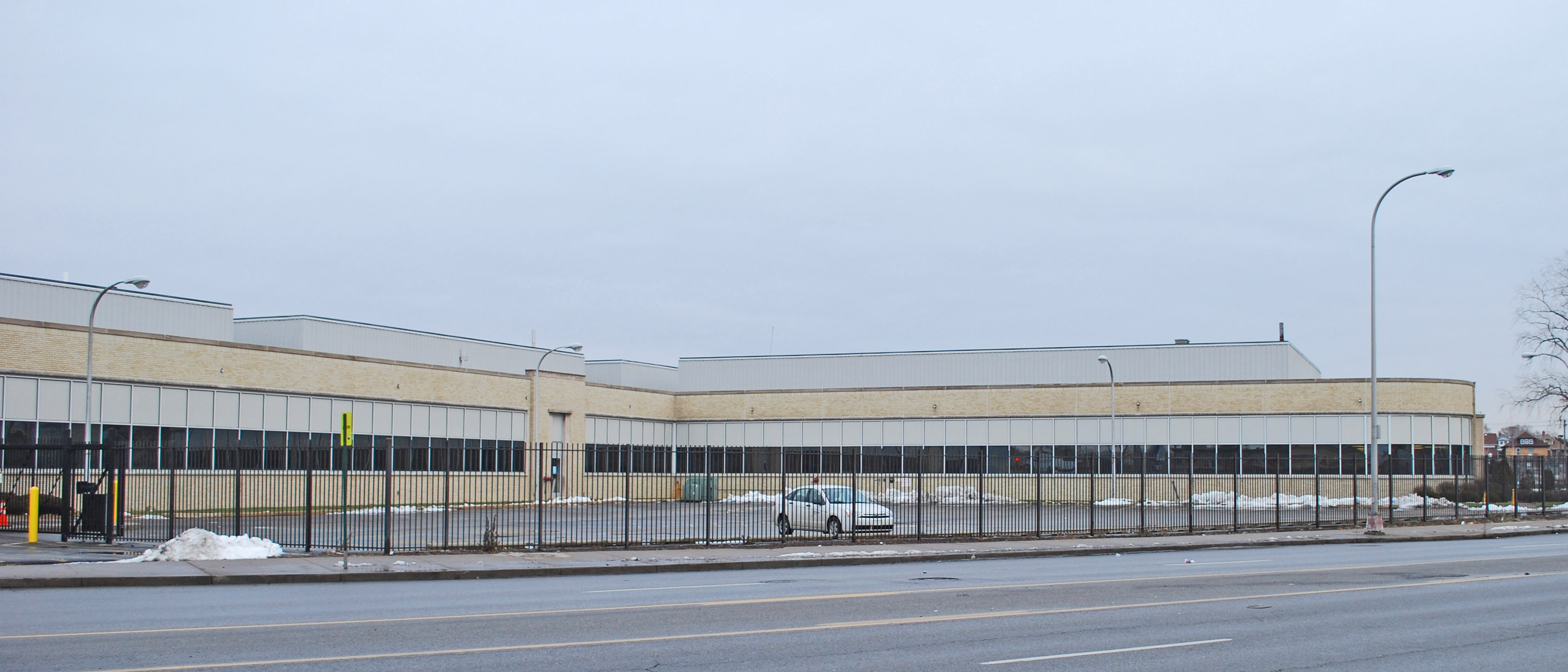
Newer office building on Warren, east of original Administration Building site, demolished in 2020
