= Lincoln Custom =

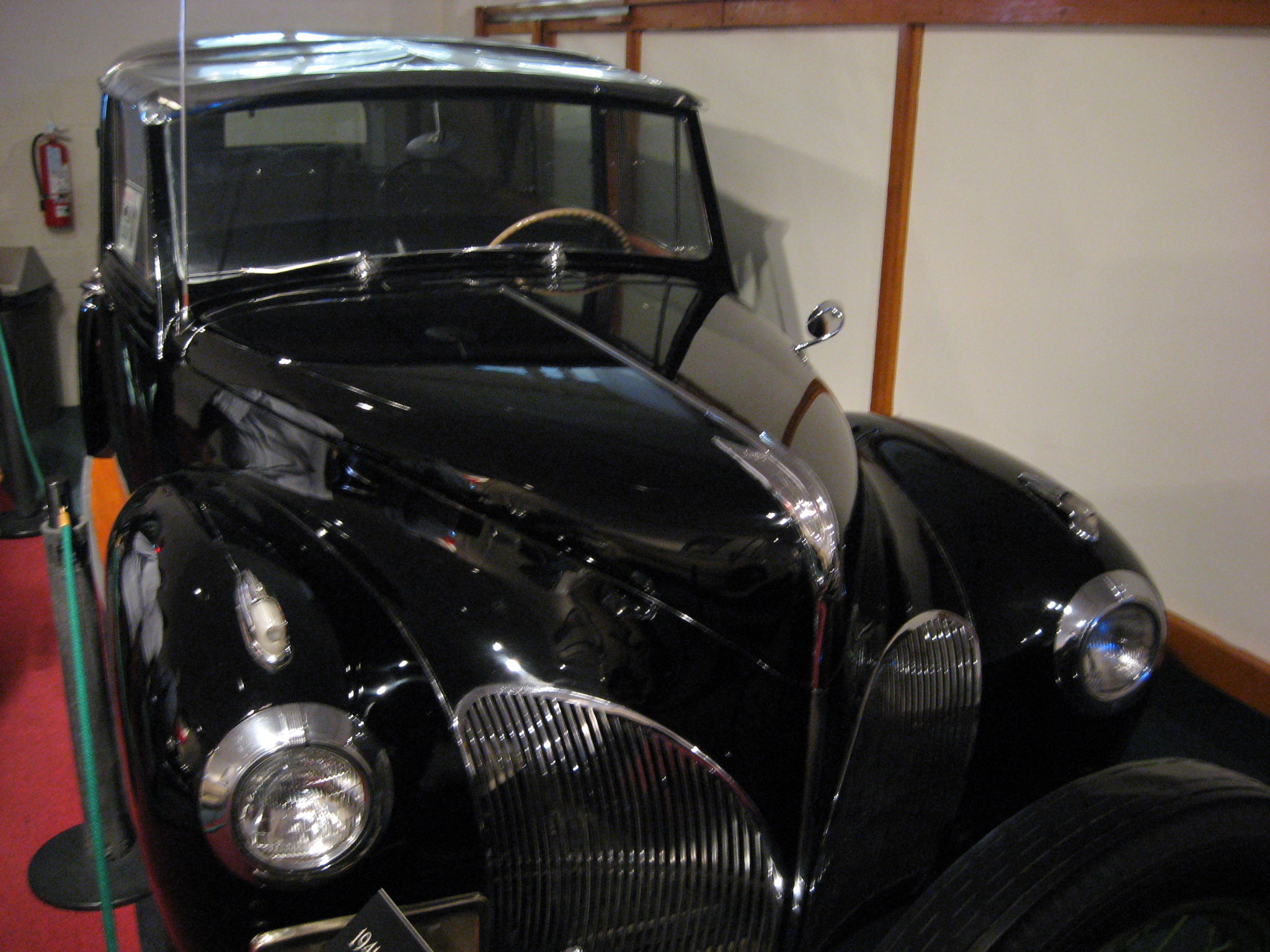

Overview
- Manufacturer: Lincoln (Ford)
- Also called: Lincoln Model 31; Lincoln Model 32
- Production: 1941–1942; 1955
- Assembly: Lincoln Assembly, Detroit, Michigan; Edison Assembly, Edison, New Jersey; Long Beach Assembly, Long Beach, California

Body and chassis
- Class: Luxury car
- Body style: Limousine; 4-door sedan
- Related: Lincoln-Zephyr; Lincoln "Sunshine Special"

Powertrain
- Engine: 292 cu in (4.8 L) Lincoln-Zephyr V12
- Transmission: 3-speed manual with overdrive

Dimensions
- Wheelbase: 138 in (3,505.2 mm)

Chronology
- Predecessor: Lincoln K series

The Lincoln Custom is a custom limousine and long-wheelbase touring sedan that was built by Lincoln in 1941 and 1942 and the lower level series Lincoln produced in 1955. Initially it was a replacement for the previous Model K Lincolns (produced from 1934 to 1939) and earlier luxury cars of the 1920s and 1930s. The body work for the Custom was provided by the factory and came in one appearance and abandoned the previous Model L and Model K of years past of manufacturing only the chassis then a long list of coachbuilders would provide coachwork to the customer's preference. In later years it was simply the base model series.

== Overview ==
The Lincoln Custom was based on the Lincoln-Zephyr, a smaller, unit-bodied, mid-range priced vehicle introduced in 1936 with a smaller 267 cu. inch V-12 (based on the Ford V-8) while drawing many similarities to the De Luxe Ford. This engine was enlarged to 292-ci for 1938, 305 ci 1942 only, but reduced to 292 ci after the war for the sake of durability, the "Ford-and-a-half" engine never a paragon of such. This car competed with the Packard Super Eight, Cadillac Sixty Special and Buick Limited while the Lincoln-Zephyr was considered the "junior" introduced in the mid-1930s to a shrinking luxury car market as engineering advances diminished the difference in performance between the outsized earlier luxe and the newer, more rational, affordable offerings. The earlier Lincoln Model K sold 3024 units in 1934, the first year of its production, only 133 units in 1939, 18 in 1940. 1940 saw the Zephyr and the higher priced Continental carrying the Lincoln name.

The wheelbase of the Lincoln Custom was 138 inches (3.5 m) compared to the Zephyr's 125 inches (3.2 m), and only the seven-passenger sedan or limousine were offered. The interior choices offered a choice of broadcloth upholstery, while a long list of custom interior choices were available including leather. The Zephyr and Custom used the same V-12 engine that was enlarged for 1942 to 305 cubic inches (5,000 cc) with 130 horsepower (97 kW). The engine was the weakest point of the 1942 models, being very prone to overheating and premature wear. The 305 cubic inch version was reduced to a 292 cubic inches (4,790 cc), 120 horsepower (89 kW) version after World War II in an attempt to promote longevity. The V-12 was the only engine used in Lincolns until the new 1949 models came out with a flathead V-8 based on a Ford truck engine.

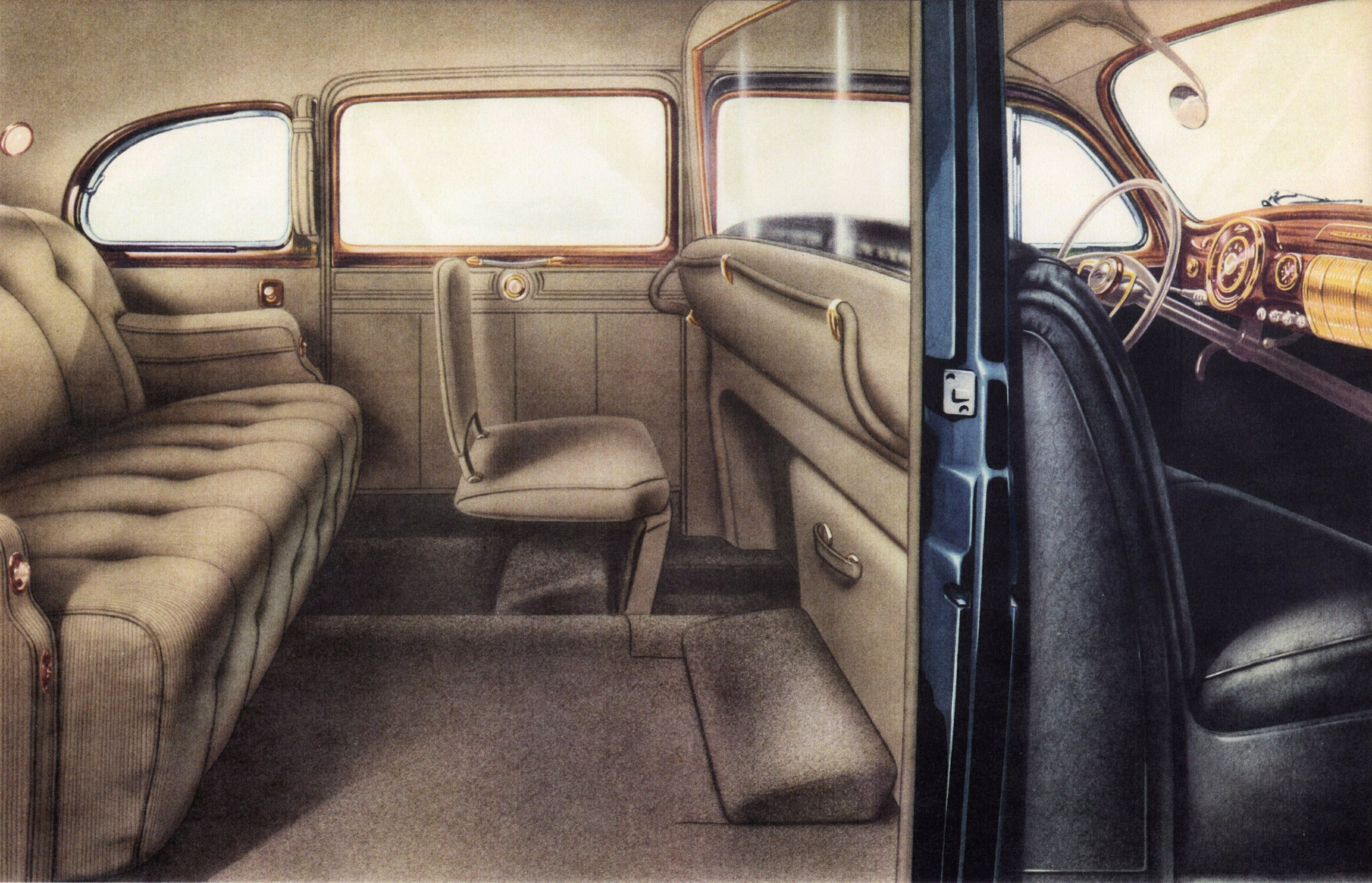
1941 Lincoln Custom limousine interior

The 168H (1941) and 268H (1942) Lincoln Customs featured two models: the Model 31 eight passenger sedan listed for US$2,950 ($58,129 in 2025 dollars) and the model 32 eight passenger limousine listed for US$3,075 ($60,592 in 2025 dollars). Differences included a division window and different front seat upholstery for the limousine. Both utilized a three speed transmission with Borg-Warner overdrive and Columbia two-speed rear axle. A small number were modified by the few custom coach builders left in the United States before the war. The 1942 models introduced power windows to the luxury car field; electric and hydro-electric powered limousine dividers having previously been offered.

Specifications were:

Year	Model number	Body style	Weight	Price	Number built
1941	31	Sedan	4,250 lb (1,930 kg)	$2750	355
1941	32	Limousine	4,270 lb (1,940 kg)	$2836	295
1942	31	Sedan	4,380 lb (1,990 kg)	$2950	47
1942	32	Limousine	4,400 lb (2,000 kg)	$3075	66

For 1942, the Zephyr-based waterfall grille was changed to a broad full-width grille that extended above and below the hood and was also used in the 1946-1948 models (Lincoln sedan and Lincoln Continental). These changes were undoubtedly due to the major Cadillac and Packard grille design changes during these immediate pre-war years, whose production and sales far outpaced Lincoln.

After World War II, production of these vehicles was not resumed. The former Zephyr became the only Lincoln sedan and was available in both standard and DeLuxe versions. The famous Lincoln Continental remained as a limited production, very expensive (and not very reliable) semi-custom offering from the luxury division of Ford Motor Company. For 1949, a major revamp of the entire Lincoln line was made, eliminating the slant-back Zephyr and custom Continental and introducing relatively modern V-8 power.

In 1955, the Lincoln Custom name returned (for one year only) as the lower level series. Brakes were 12" drums.

== Presidential limousine ==
A special 1942 limousine was provided to the White House for the President's use. This car weighed more than 7,000 pounds (3,200 kg) and was refitted with a 1946 grille clip after the war for modernization. Cadillac and Lincoln vied for visibility and prestige by supplying limousines and other special vehicles to the White House (generally by means of a $1.00 per year or other low-cost lease arrangement). Packard and Chrysler were rarely able to penetrate this exclusive advertising strategy.
