= Lincoln V12 engine =

Ford Motor Company's Lincoln division has produced three distinct Lincoln V12 engines:

- 1932–1942 L-heads:
  - 1932–1933 Lincoln L-head V12 engine
  - 1933–1942 Lincoln L-head V12 engine
- 1936–1948 Flatheads:
  - 1936–1948 Lincoln-Zephyr V12 engine
