= Sunshine Special (disambiguation) =

Sunshine Special may refer to:

- Sunshine Special (automobile), the presidential limousine used by Franklin D. Roosevelt.
- Sunshine Special, the former flagship of Missouri Pacific Railroad's passenger train service.
