= Lincoln K series =

Car model

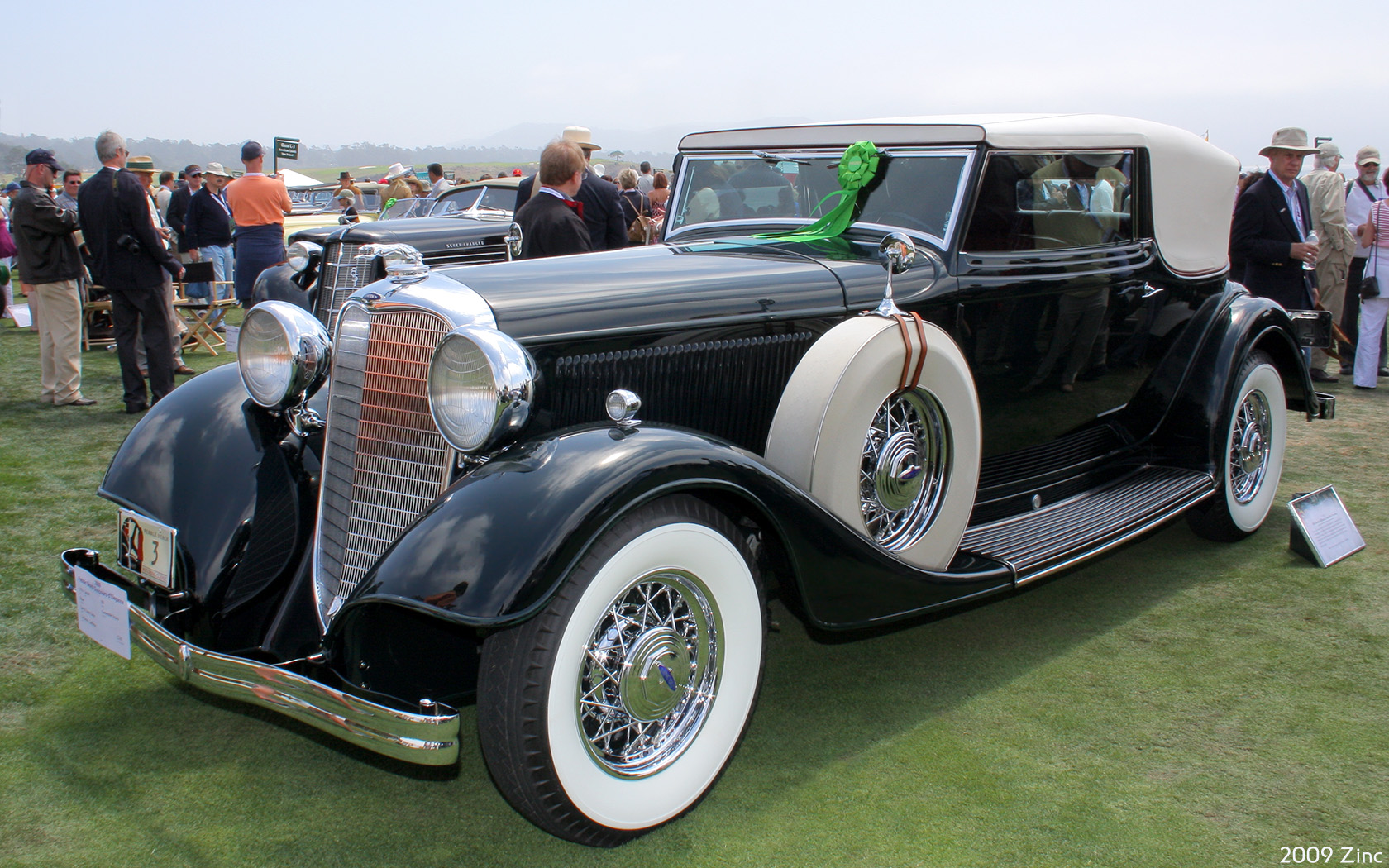
- 1933 Lincoln Model KB Brunn Convertible Victoria

Overview
- Manufacturer: Lincoln (Ford)
- Also called: Lincoln Model K
- Model years: 1931–1940
- Assembly: Lincoln Assembly, Detroit, Michigan, U.S. Long Beach Assembly, Long Beach, California, U.S.
- Designer: E.T. (Bob) Gregorie; Edsel Ford

Body and chassis
- Class: Ultra-luxury car
- Body style: Coachbuilt to owner's preference

Powertrain
- Engine: 382 cu in (6.3 L) Lincoln KA L-head V12; 385 cu in (6.3 L) Fork and Blade V8 L-head V8; 414 cu in (6.8 L) Lincoln KA L-head V12; 448 cu in (7.3 L) Lincoln KB L-head V12
- Transmission: 3-speed manual

Dimensions
- Wheelbase: 136 in (3454 mm); 145 in (3683 mm)

Chronology
- Predecessor: Lincoln L-Series/Model L
- Successor: Lincoln Custom

The Lincoln K series (also called the Lincoln Model K, in line with Ford nomenclature) is a luxury vehicle that was produced by the Lincoln Motor Company between 1931 and 1940. The second motor line produced by the company, the Model K was developed from the Model L, including a modernized chassis on a longer wheelbase. In 1931, Lincoln also introduced a V-12, becoming a feature of the company for nearly 20 years.

One of the most exclusive vehicles produced in the United States during the 1930s, the Model K competed domestically against the Cadillac V-12 and V-16, Packard Twin Six, Chrysler Imperial, Pierce-Arrow Model 53, and Duesenberg Model J, as well as bespoke-bodied, ultra-luxury models from Hispano-Suiza, Rolls-Royce, Bentley, Bugatti, and Mercedes-Benz. Alongside multiple body configurations produced by Lincoln, bare chassis were provided for coachbuilders.

After the 1939 model year, Lincoln ended production of the Model K, selling leftover vehicles as 1940 models. For 1941 and 1942, the Lincoln Custom was sold as an indirect successor to the Model K, offered as an eight-passenger limousine or touring sedan produced as a long-wheelbase version of the Lincoln-Zephyr. Since World War II, various Lincoln sedans (the Continental or its Town Car successor) have been produced as long-wheelbase sedans or factory limousines, but no direct model line has been developed as a successor to the Model K (as of 2020 production).

== 1931 ==
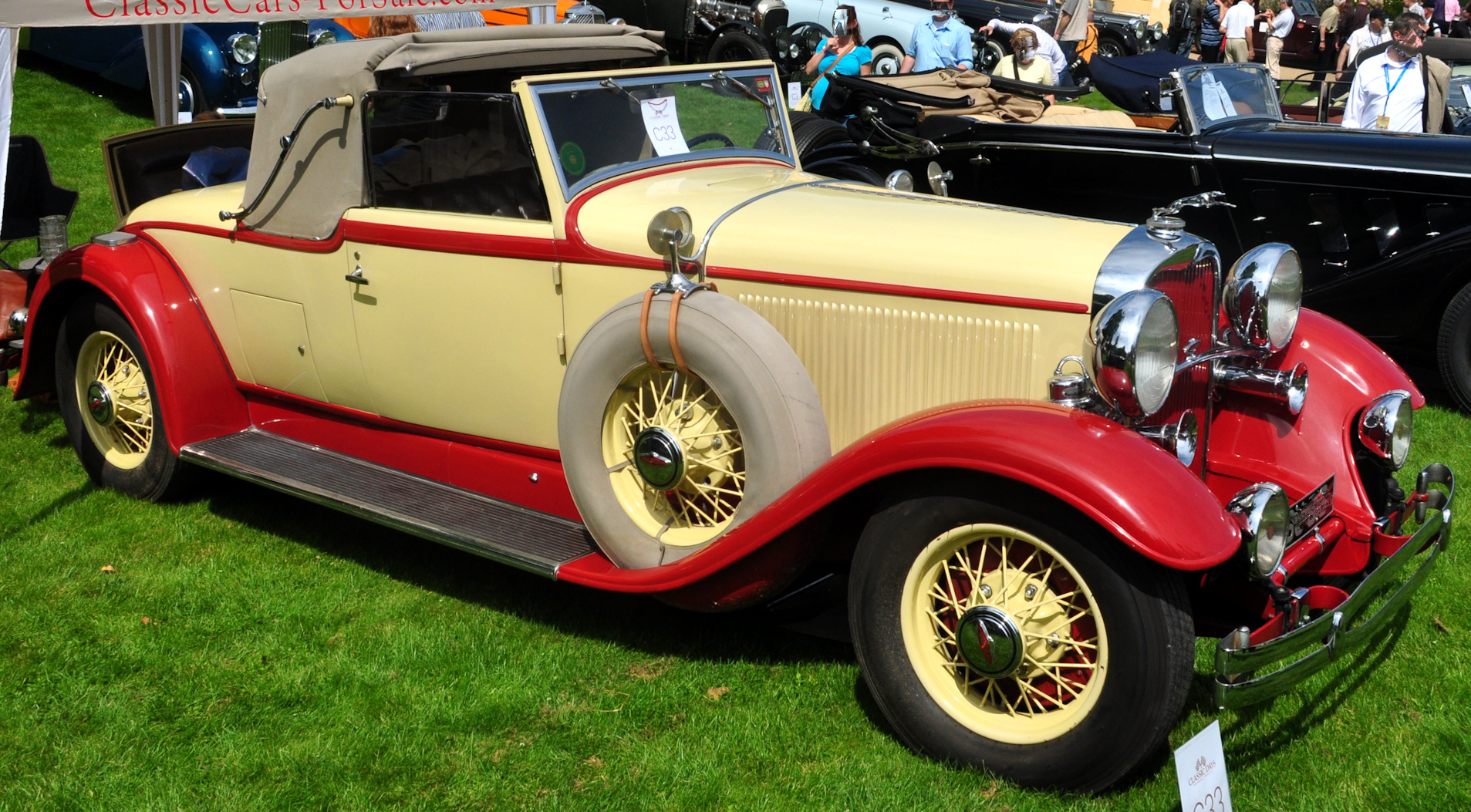
1931 Model K LeBaron roadster convertible

The original Model K appeared in the 1931 model year on a new chassis with a 145 in (3683 mm) wheelbase. Factory bodies included two- and four-door phaetons, the latter available as a dual-cowl model. The 384.8 in³ (6.3 L) engine was a derivative of the earlier L-series 60° V8, but a dual-venturi downdraft Stromberg carburetor, higher compression, and altered timing raised the power to 120 hp (89 kW).

It competed with the then-recently introduced Chrysler Imperial, Renault Reinastella, Rolls-Royce Phantom II, Mercedes-Benz 770, Duesenberg Model J, Packard Eight, and Cadillac Series 355.

Lincoln offered its clients a long list of coachbuilders with very desirous reputations that were contracted to provide coachwork. Providers who were retained from the previous Model L were Wolfington, Judkins, Willoughby, Brunn, LeBaron, Dietrich, Locke, Derham, Rollston, Waterhouse, and Murphy.

== 1932 ==
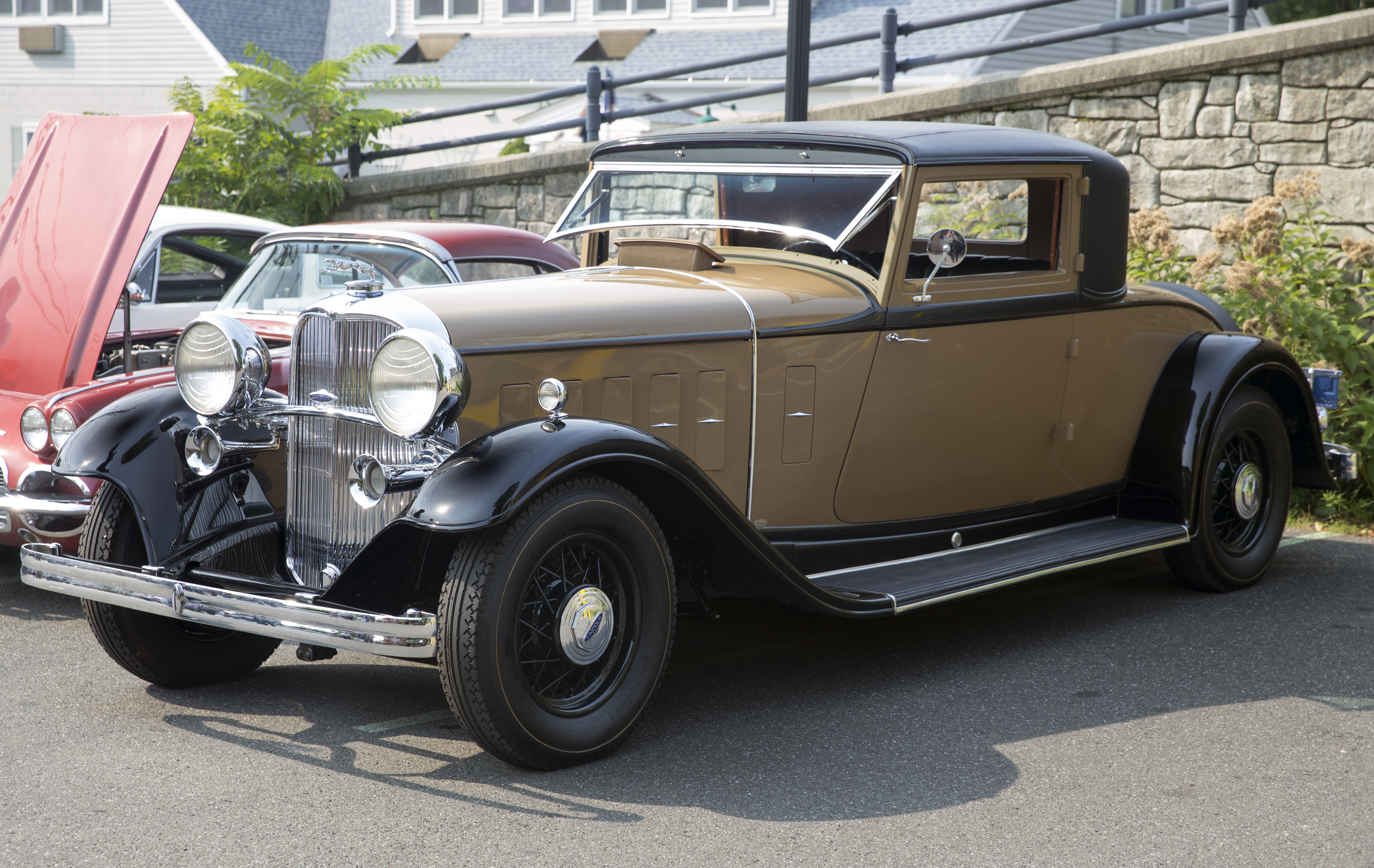
1932 Lincoln Model K with custom coupe coachwork by J.B Judkins

The Lincoln K series was split in 1932 into two lines, the V8 carryover Model KA and the new V12-powered Model KB. The V8 car reverted to a 136 in (3454 mm) wheelbase, though engine output was pushed to 125 hp (93 kW). The KB, though, featured the marque's new L-head V12 engine. The 447.9 cuin (7.3 L) 65° L-head unit produced 150 hp (112 kW). Both series featured a new grille with less of a surround, vent doors rather than vertical louvers on the sides of the hood, a parking light on top of each front fender, and 18-inch wire wheels. The Lincoln V-12 competed directly with cross-town rival Cadillac V-12 introduced earlier in 1930, and it joined a select group of 1930s cars with multicylinder engines, namely those manufactured by Franklin, Hispano-Suiza, Horch, Lagonda, Maybach, Packard, Rolls-Royce, Tatra, Voisin, Walter, and Marmon. The Victoria Coupe was offered as both a steel roof and a convertible, and the coupe was the inspiration for the smaller 1932 Ford Victoria coupe, also offered with a V8 engine but a more affordable price. The Lincoln Victoria coupe, first introduced in limited numbers in 1929, also competed with the Packard Light Eight Victoria coupe also in 1932.

== 1933 ==
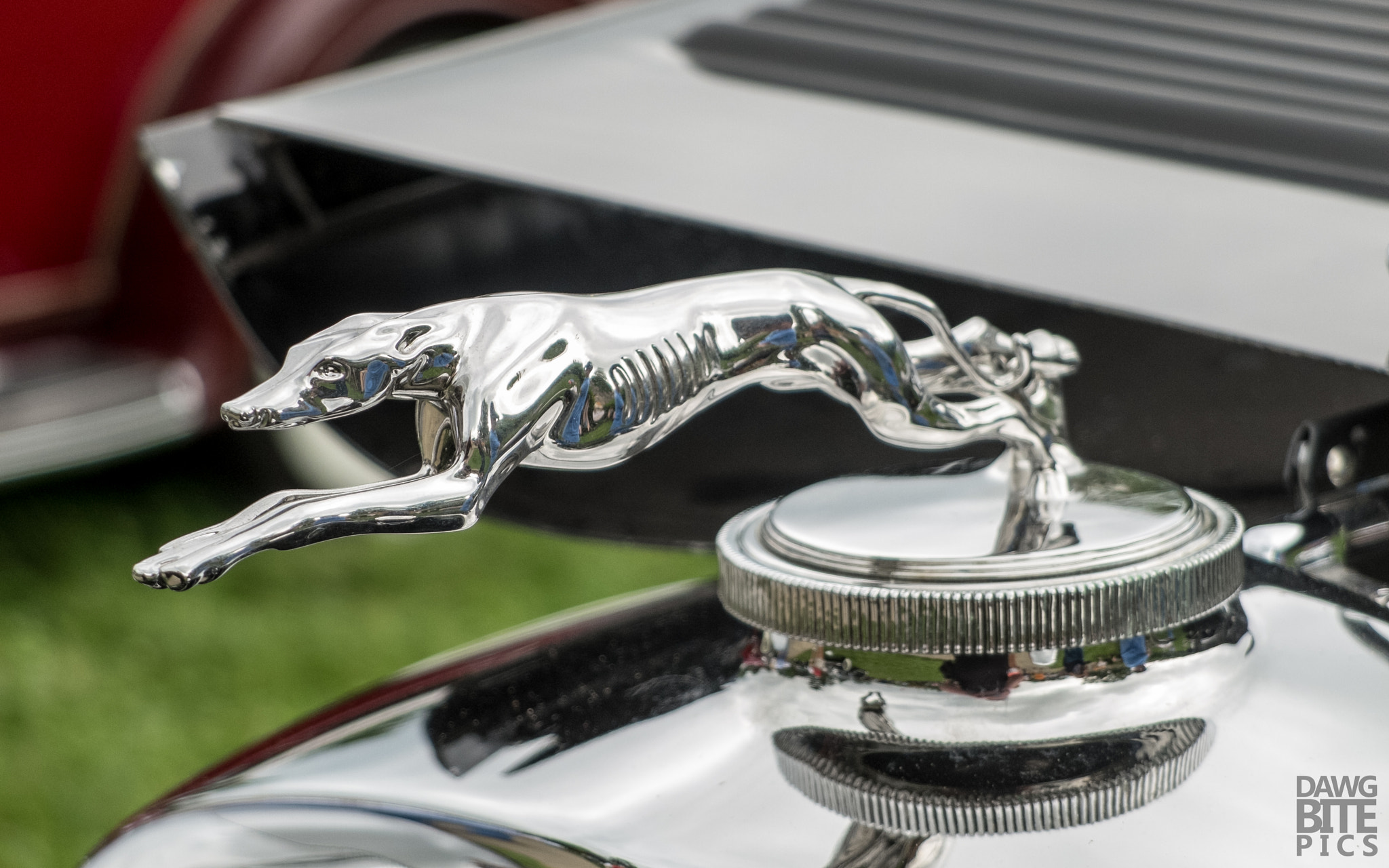
Lincoln "Greyhound dog" hood ornament

The V8 engine was replaced in the Model KA with a new 381.7 in³ (6.3 L) V12 for 1933. This L-head engine shared little with the big KB engine, which continued unchanged.

The 1933 K-series Lincolns featured many changes, only a few of which were readily visible. The removal of the bar linking the headlights and return of hood louvers was most noticeable, but the revised chassis, thermostatic shock absorbers, and transmission made the greatest differences. Drivers also noticed the adjustable-pressure brakes.

== 1934 ==
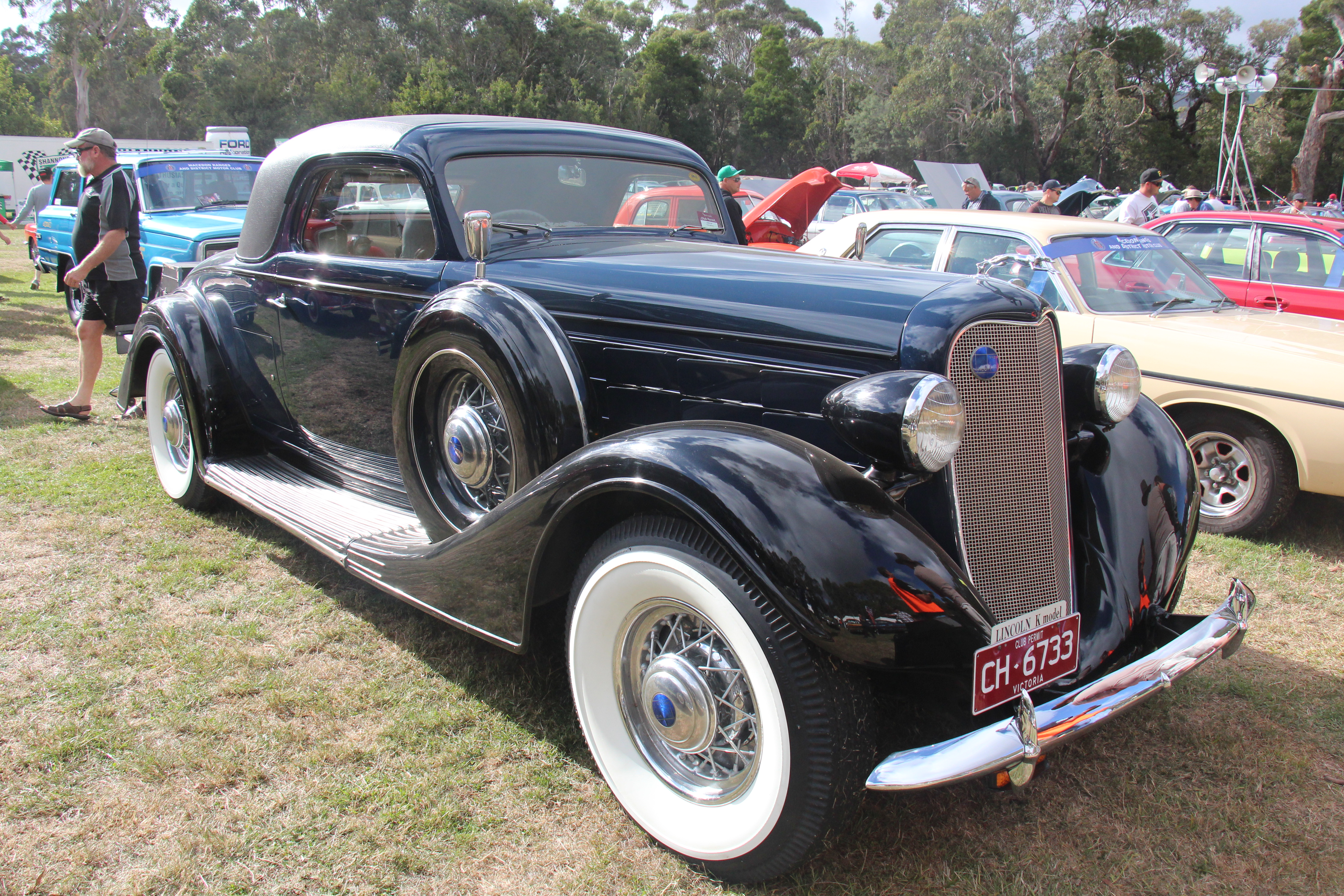
A 1934 Model K LeBaron coupe

Both V12 engines were replaced for 1934 by a single 414 cu in (6.8 L) version of the new Model KA V12, with the KA and KB names now denoting the wheelbase only. Styling changes included a body-colored grille surround and the replacement once again of louvers with doors on the side of the hood.

== 1935 ==
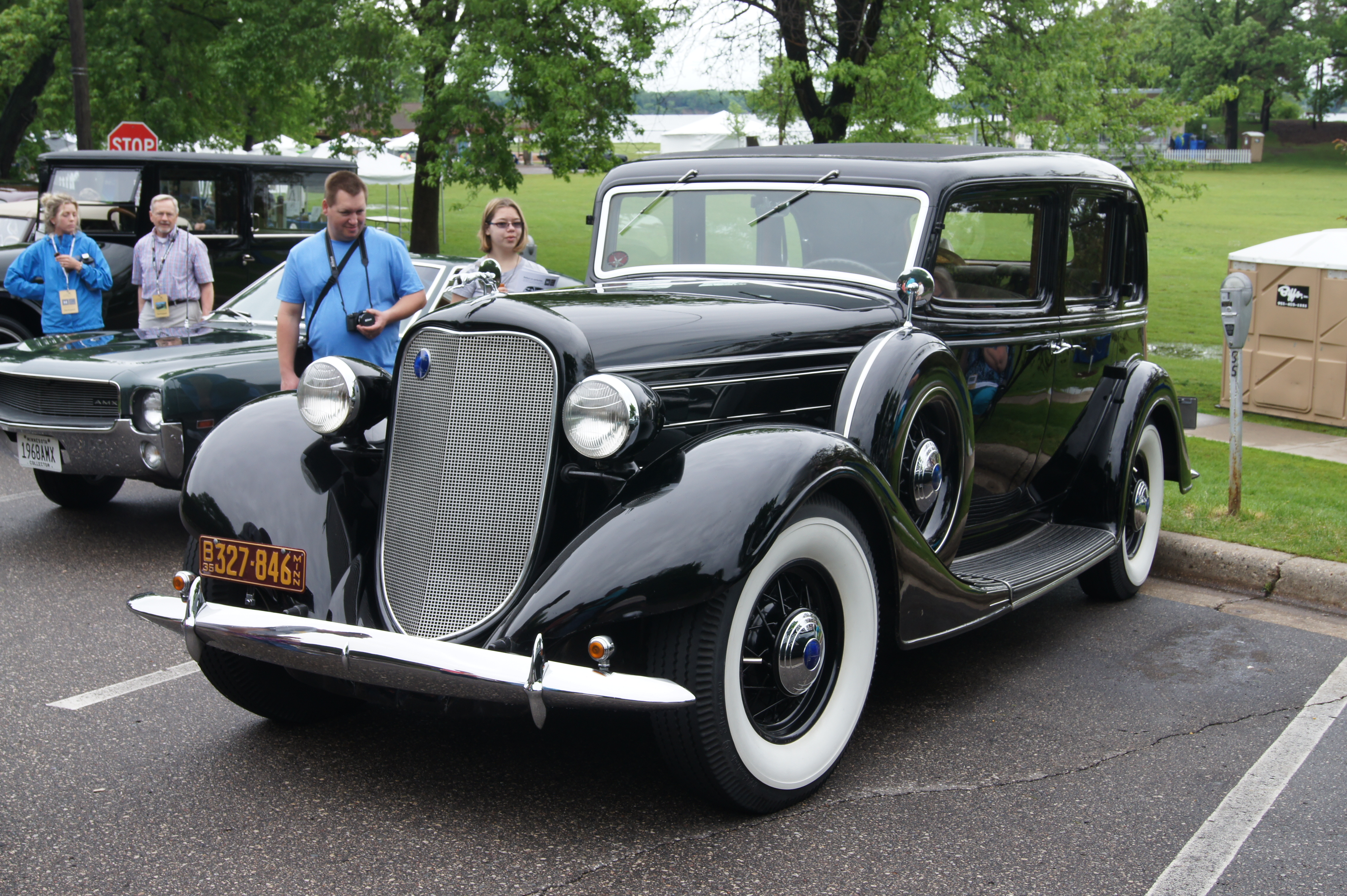
1935 Model K sedan

The Lincoln line was greatly trimmed for 1935, with all cars simply called Model K. The marque attempted to improve profitability by focusing on the lofty over-US$4,000 ($93,932 in 2025 dollars) segment, limiting sales in the depression-wracked United States.

== 1936 ==
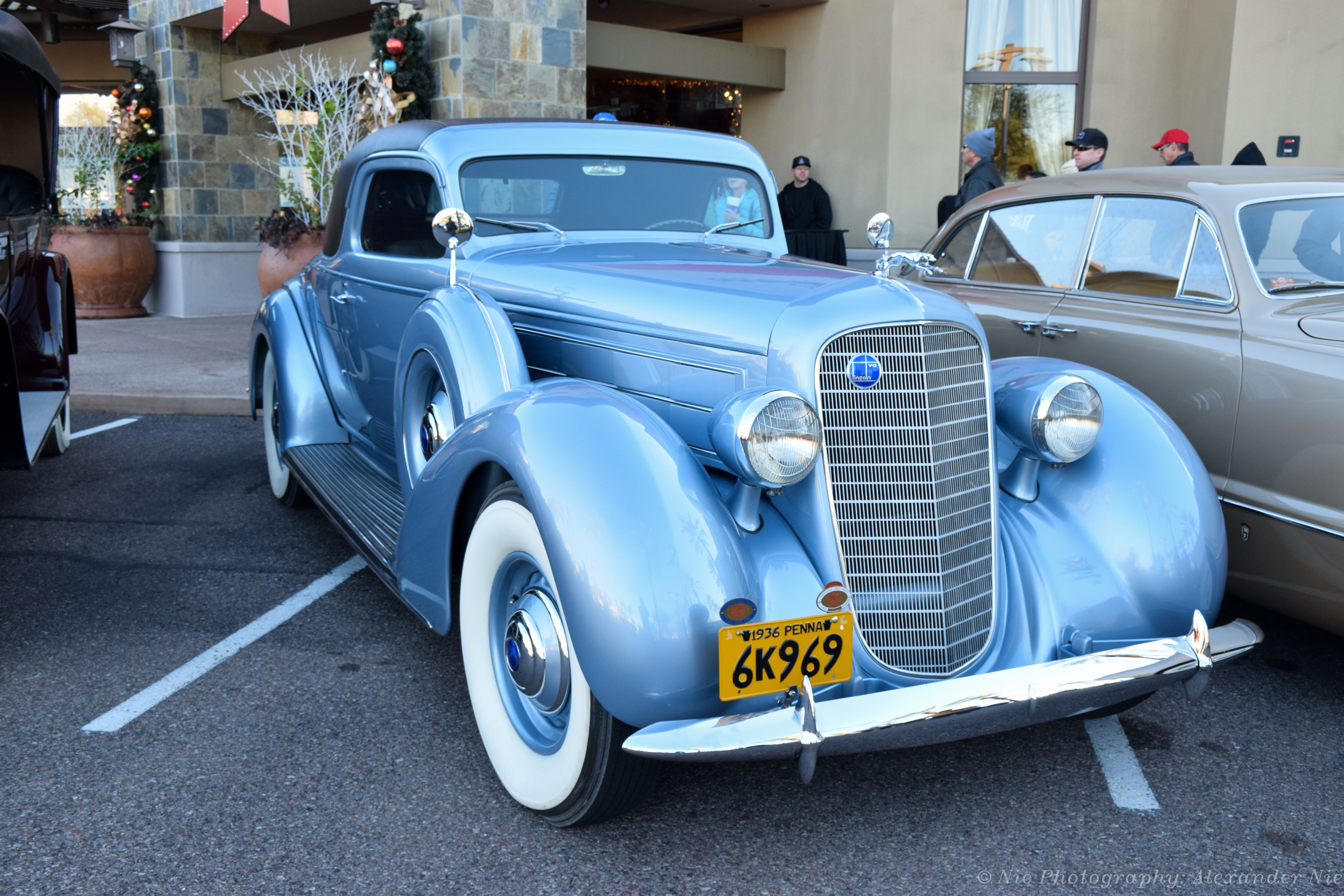
A 1936 Model K LeBaron coupe

The Model K's days were numbered, as the less-expensive and more-modern Lincoln-Zephyr debuted for 1936. Nonetheless, the seven-passenger Model K limousine was the marque's best-selling model despite its US$4700 ($109,047 in 2025 dollars) price tag.

The grille and front fascia were again redesigned, and a revised, raked windshield and pressed-steel wheels were now used.

== 1937–1940 ==
The Model K continued in production for five more years, but sales declined rapidly with the modern Zephyr and new flagship Continental being more appealing to buyers. Production was evidently completed during the 1939 model year. The last Lincoln K series was delivered in January 1940.

The "Sunshine Special" parade phaeton built for President Franklin Delano Roosevelt in 1939 was modified in 1942 with current Lincoln front sheet metal.

== Gallery ==
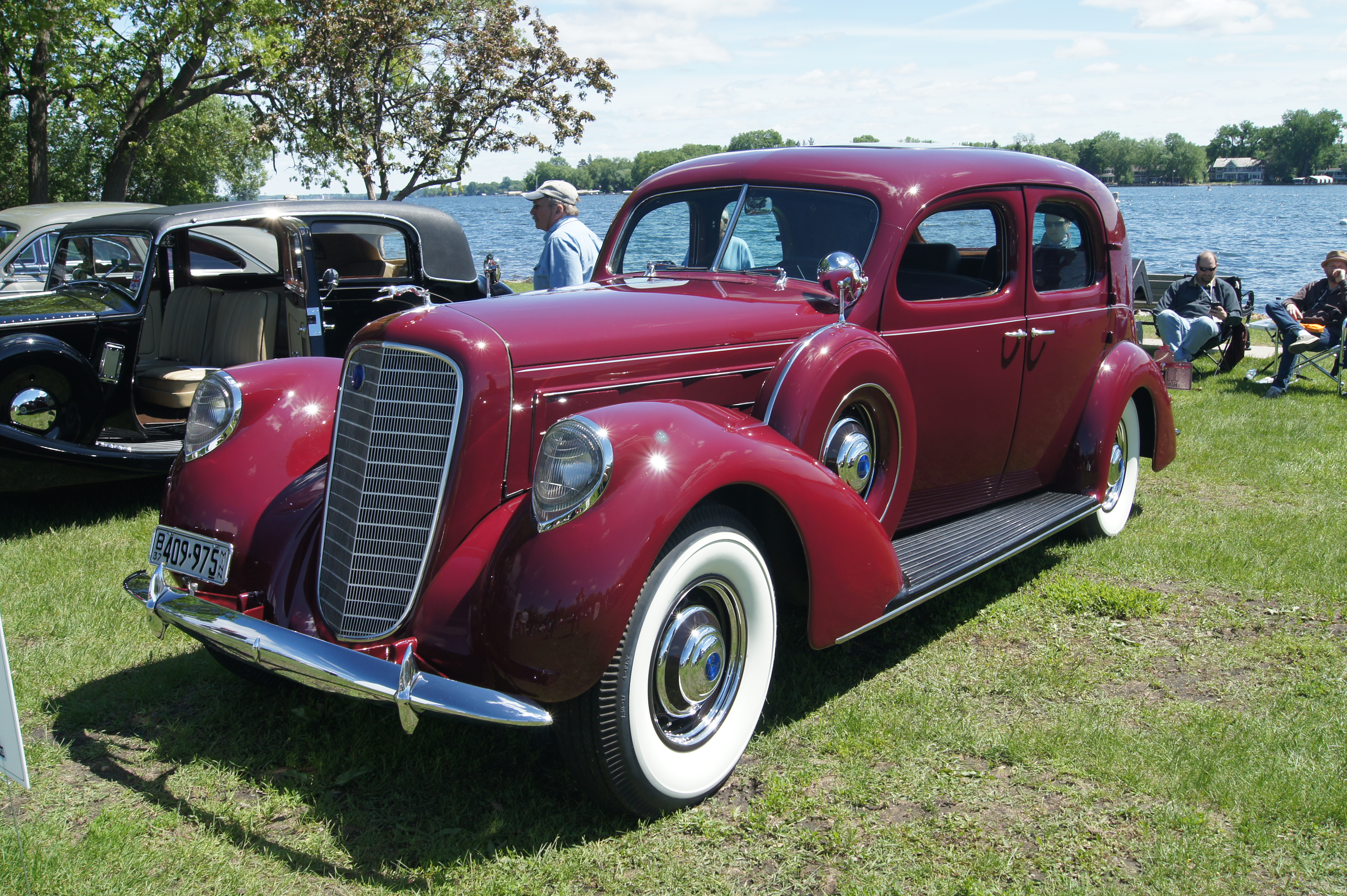
A 1937 Model K Sedan

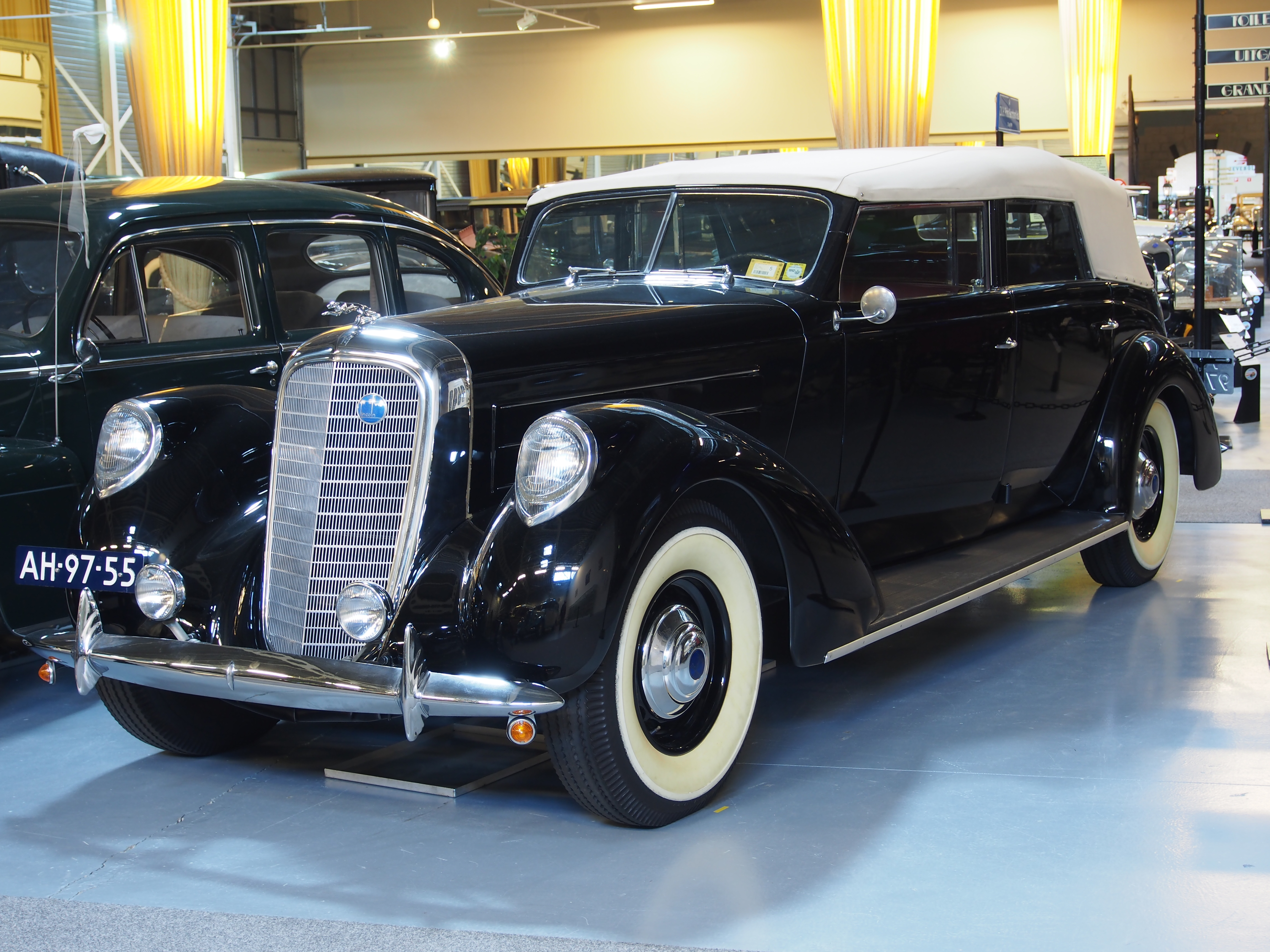
A 1937 Lincoln K363A Convertible Sedan

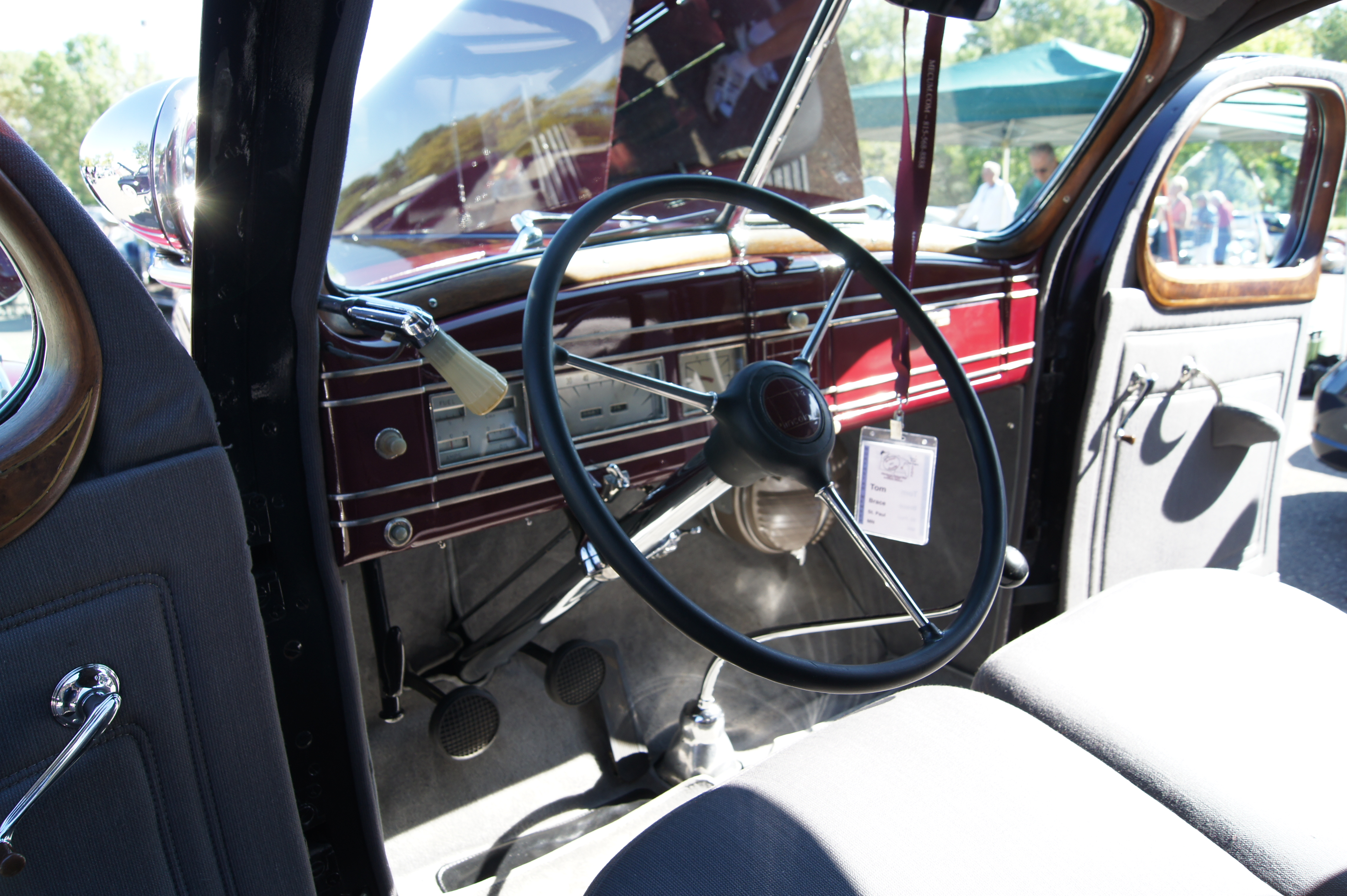
The 1937 sedan dashboard

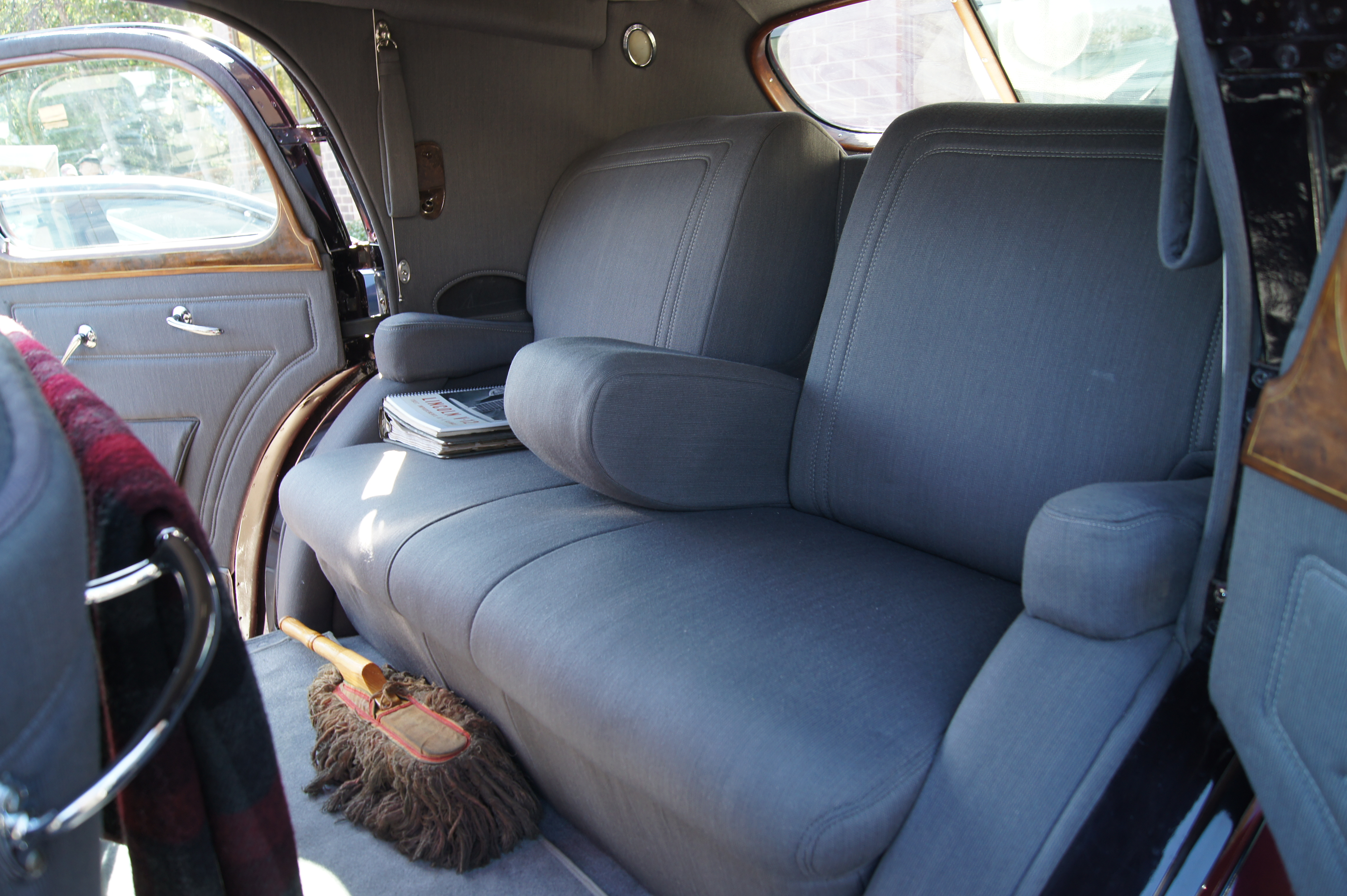
The 1937 sedan back seats

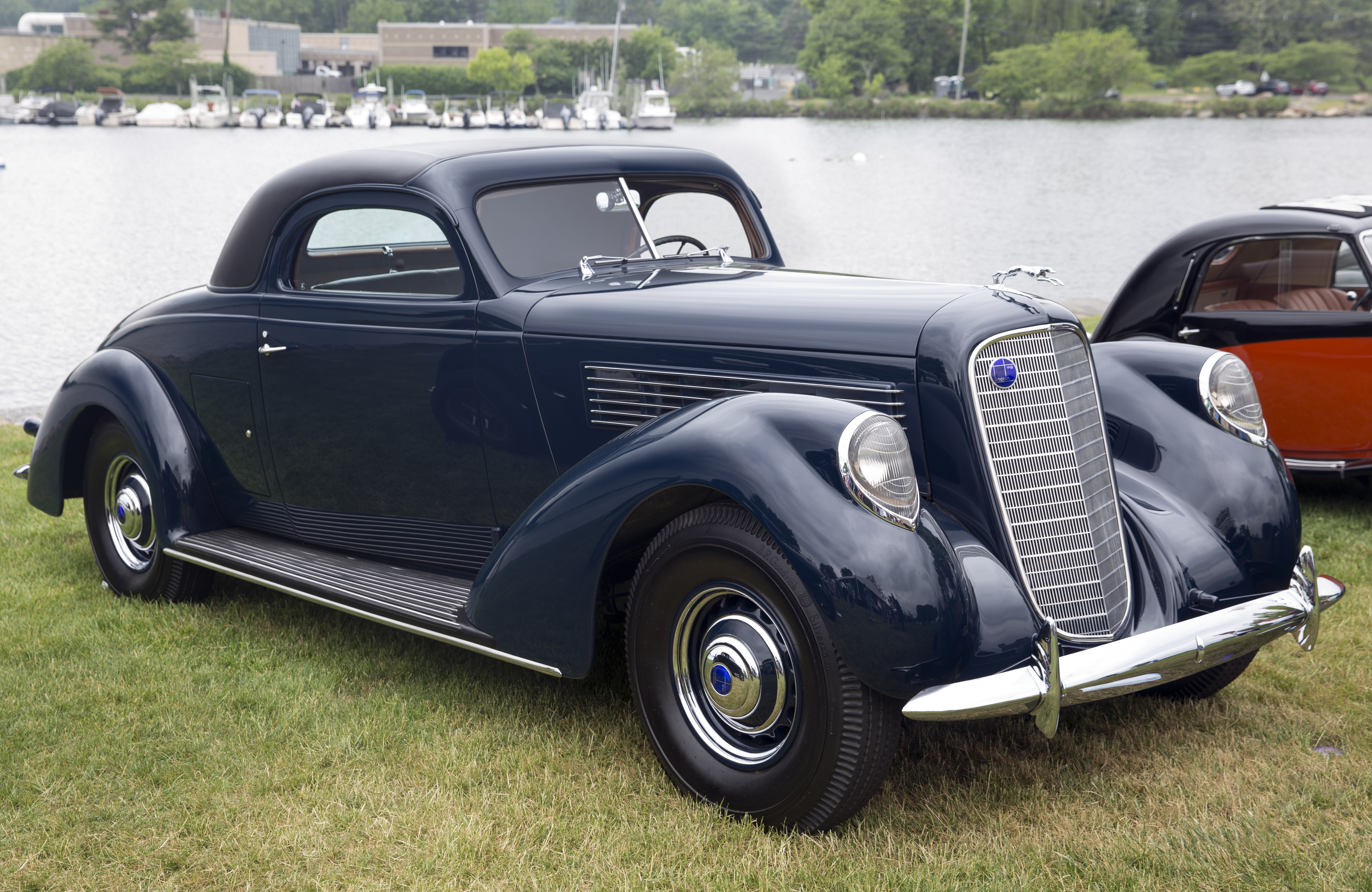
A 1938 LeBaron Coupe (style 412)

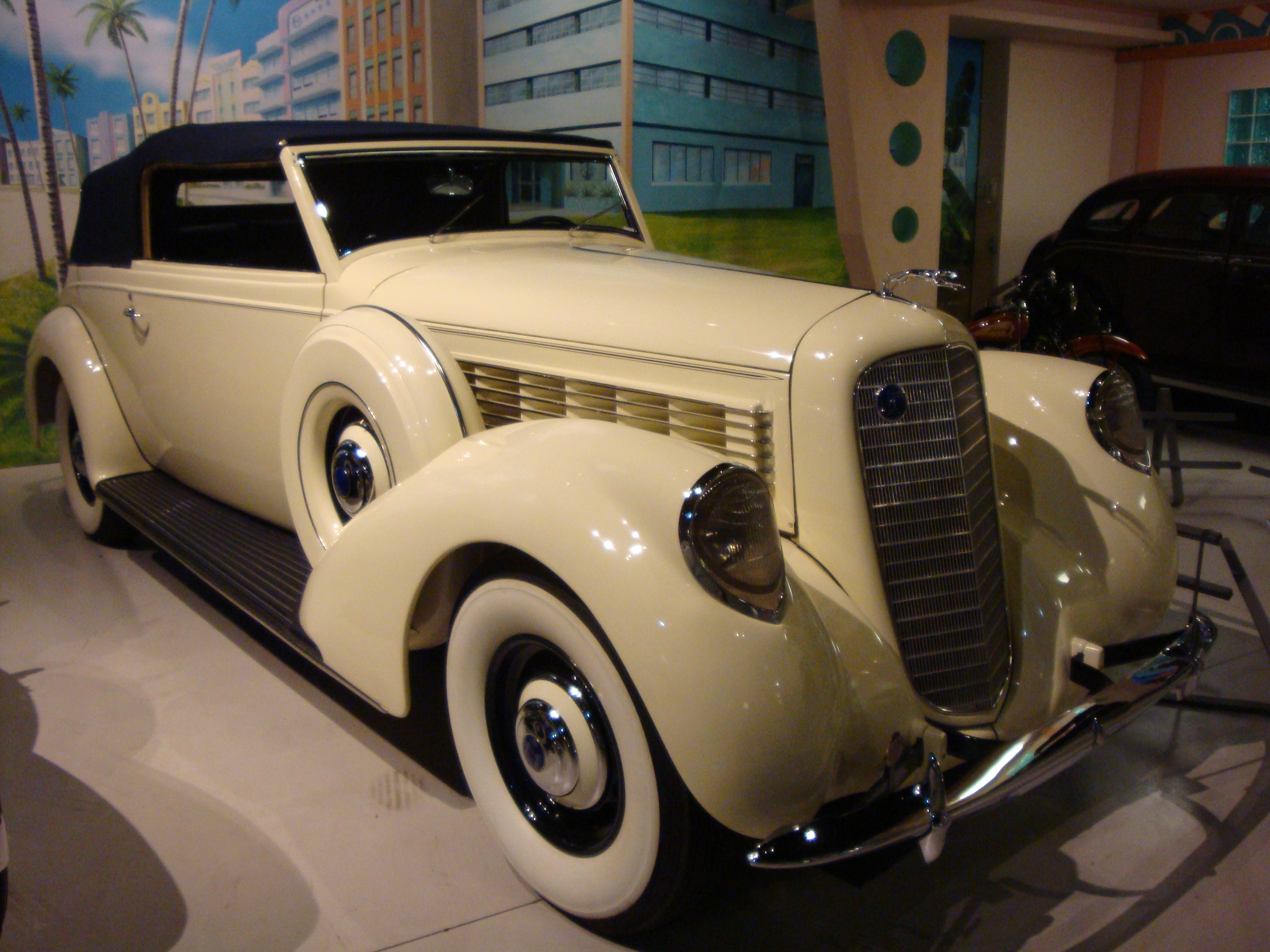
A 1938 Brunn convertible

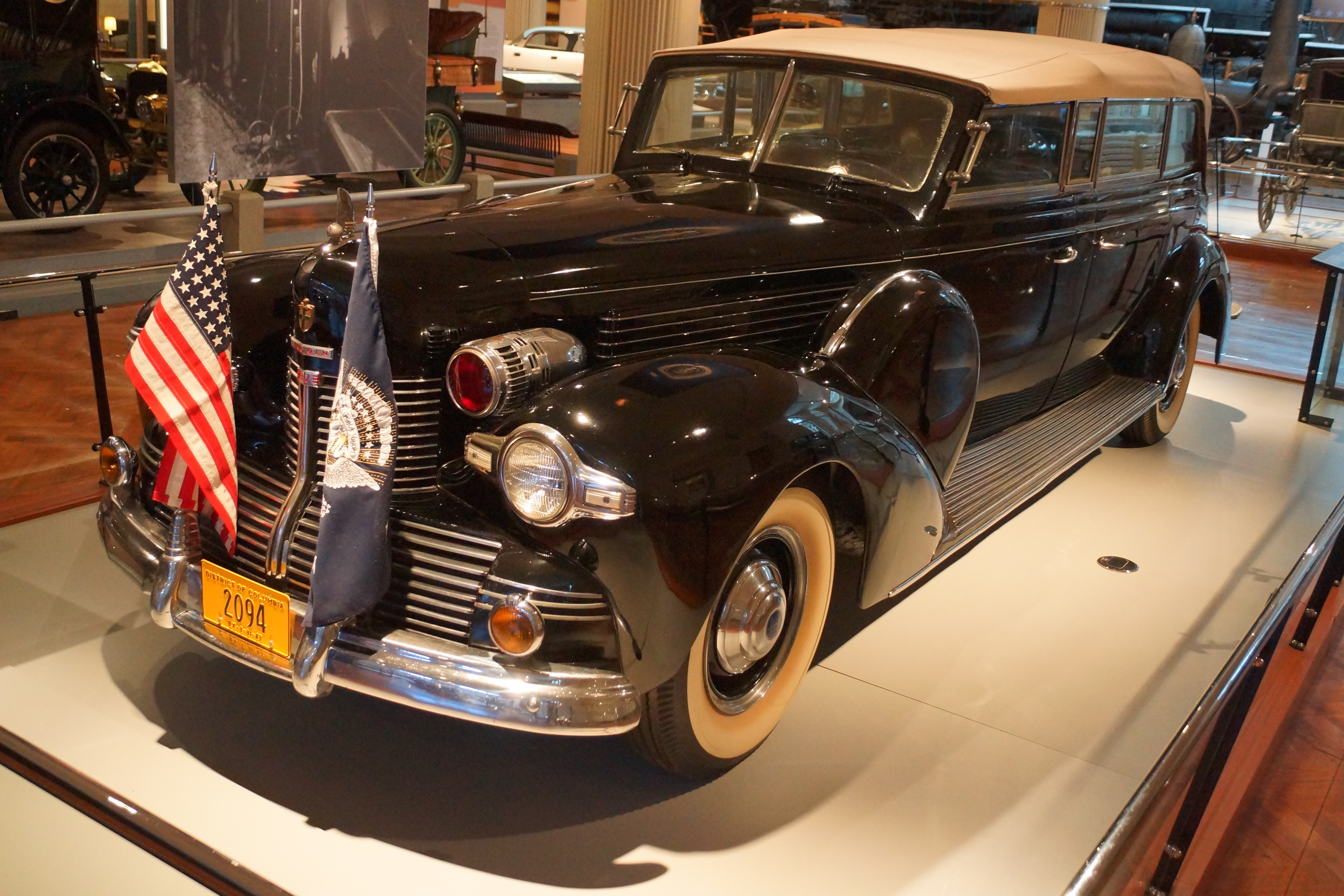
FDR's "Sunshine Special" parade phaeton
