= Limousine =

Luxury car with division driven by a chauffeur

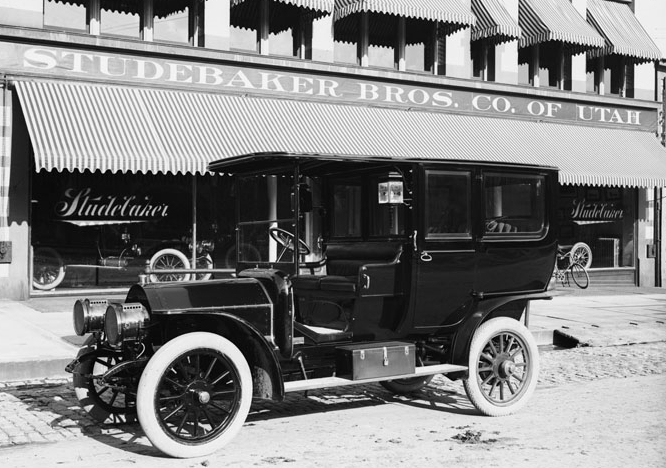
1908 Studebaker limousine with an open driver's compartment

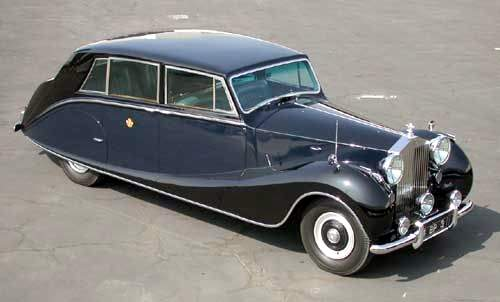
1953 Rolls-Royce Phantom IV (coachwork by Hooper)

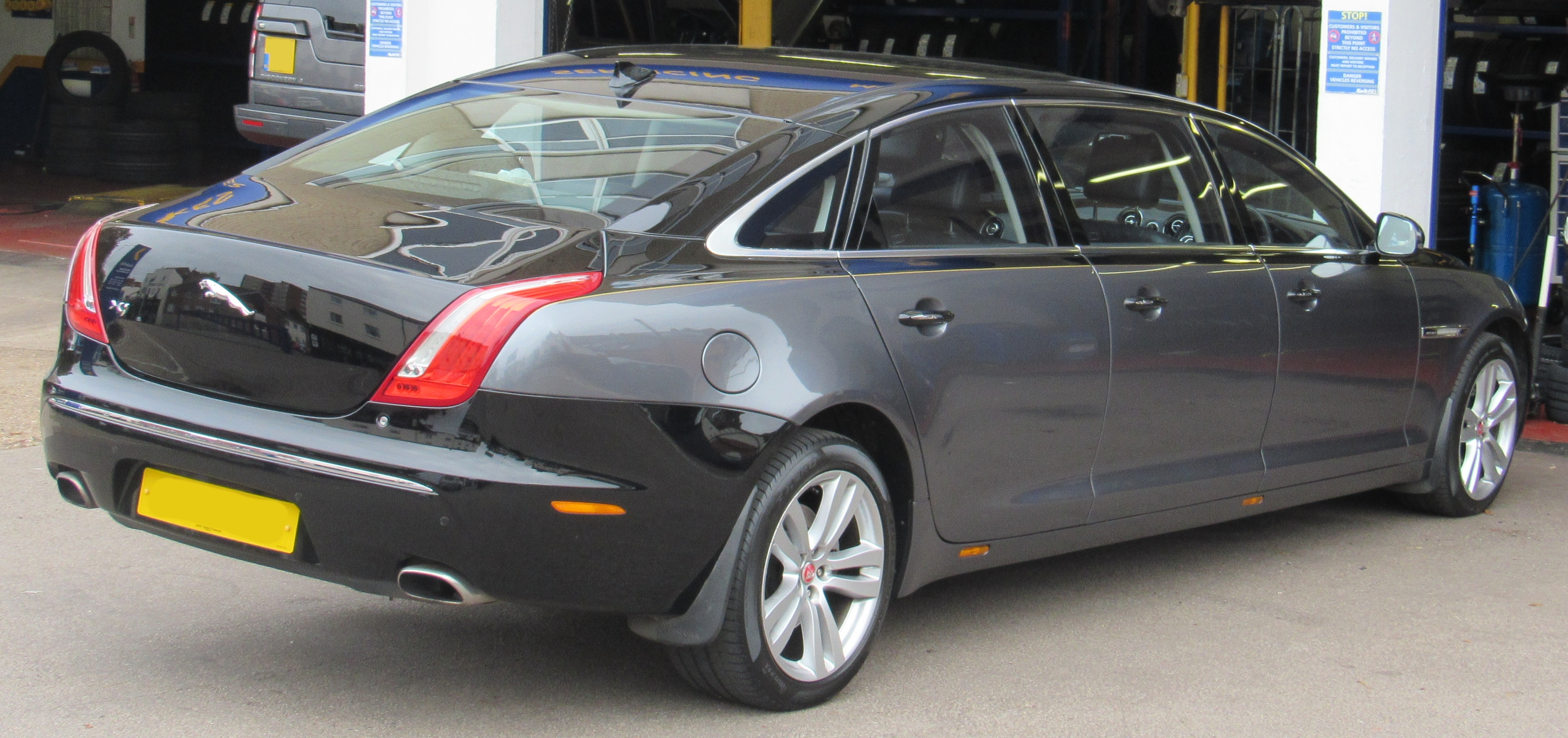
2013 Jaguar XJ Eagle, a modern limousine

A limousine (/ˈlɪməziːn/ or /lɪməˈziːn/), or limo (/ˈlɪmoʊ/) for short, is a large, chauffeur-driven luxury vehicle with a partition between the driver compartment and the passenger compartment which can be operated mechanically by hand or by a button electronically. A luxury sedan with a very long wheelbase and driven by a professional driver is called a stretch limousine.

In some countries, such as the United States, United Kingdom, Japan, Italy, Germany, France, the Netherlands, Canada, and Australia, a limousine service may be any pre-booked hire car with a driver, usually, but only sometimes a luxury car. In particular, airport shuttle services are often called "limousine services", though they often use minivans or light commercial vehicles.

== Etymology ==
The word limousine is derived from the name of the French region Limousin, however how the area's name came to be applied to the car is uncertain.

One possibility involves a particular type of carriage hood or roof that physically resembled the raised hood of the cloak worn by the shepherds there.

An alternate etymology speculates that some early chauffeurs wore a Limousin-style cloak in the open driver's compartment for protection from the weather. The name was then extended to this particular type of car with a permanent top projecting over the chauffeur. This former type of automobile had an enclosed passenger compartment seating three to five persons, with only a roof projecting forward over the open driver's area in the front.

== History ==
Wealthy owners of expensive carriages and their passengers were accustomed to their private compartments leaving their coachman or driver outside in all weathers. When automobiles arrived, the same people required a similar arrangement for their chauffeurs. As such, the 1916 definition of limousine by the US Society of Automobile Engineers is "a closed car seating three to five inside, with driver's seat outside".

In Great Britain, the limousine de-ville was a version of the limousine town car where the driver's compartment was outside and had no weather protection. The limousine-landaulet variant (also sold in the United States) had a removable or folding roof section over the rear passenger seat.

In the United States, sub-categories of limousines in 1916 were the berline, defined as "a limousine having the driver's seat entirely enclosed", and the brougham, described as "a limousine with no roof over the driver's seat."

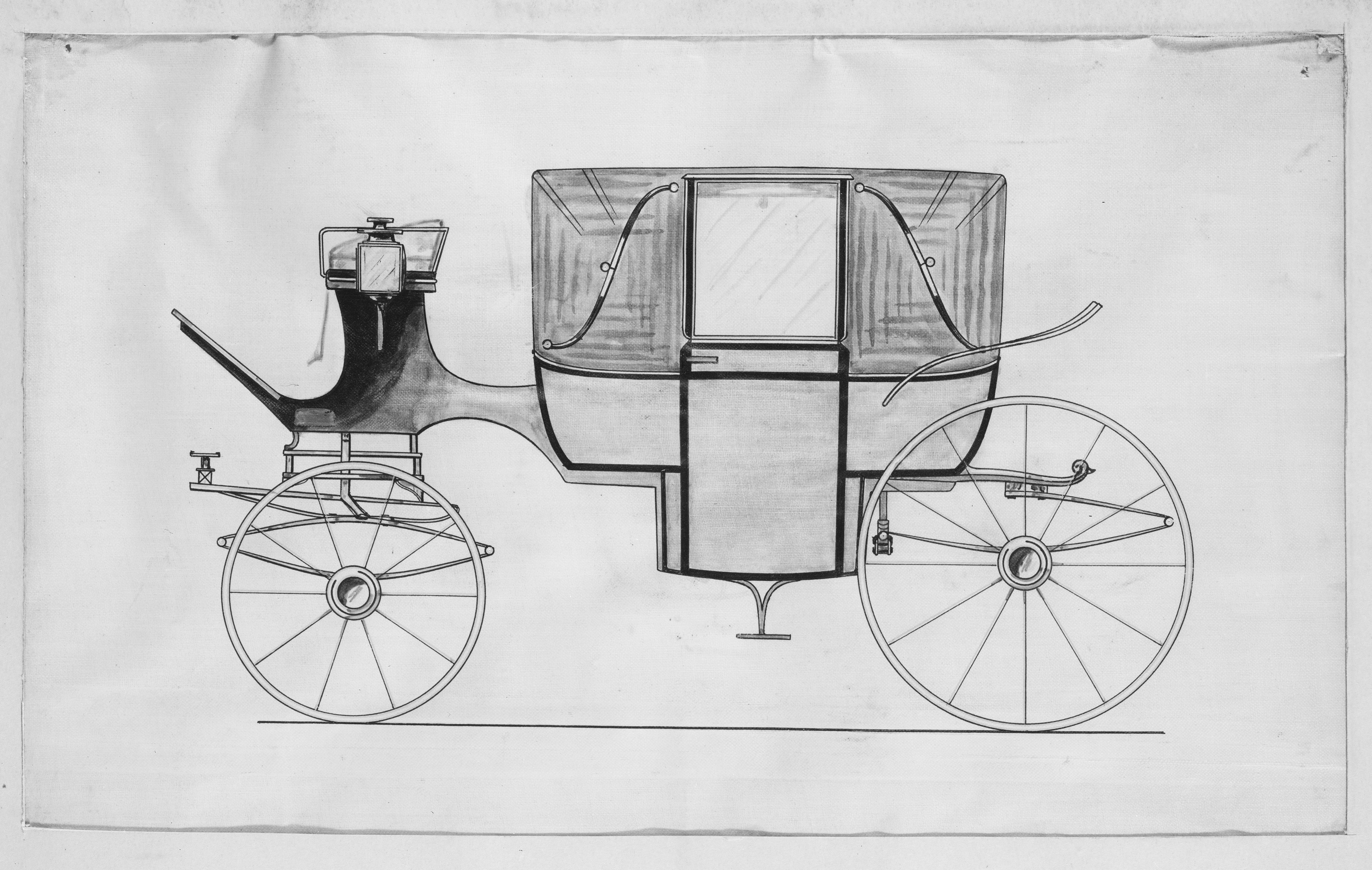
Diagram showing an exposed driver's seat

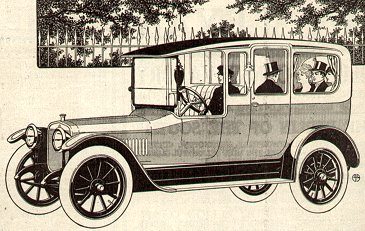
1915 Winton Six Limousine; note the open driver's compartment

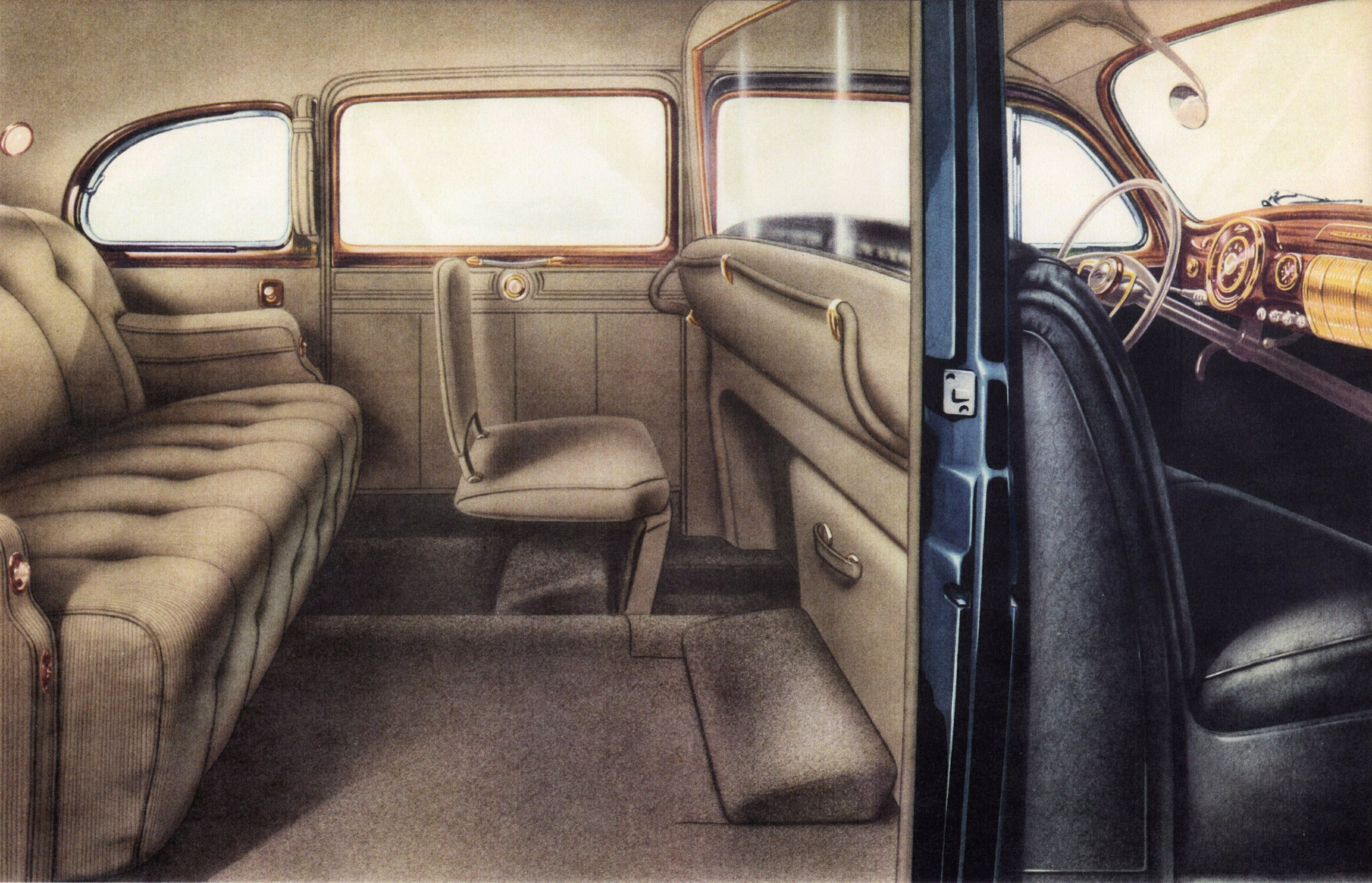
1941 Lincoln Custom limousine interior showing the occasional seats

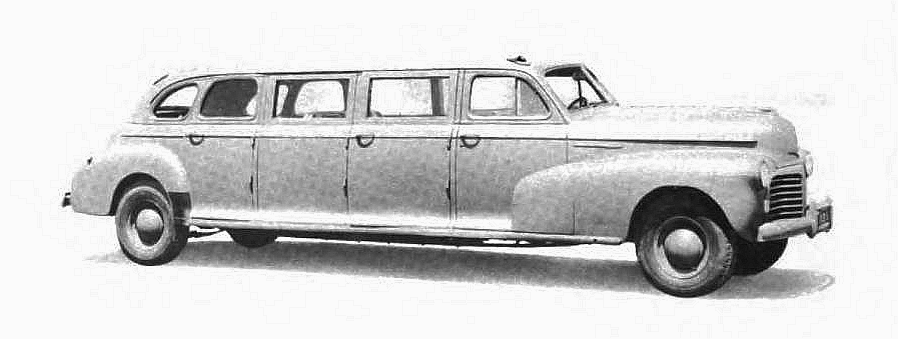
US-Army, Chevrolet Fleetline, stretch limousine, 15-Passenger (1943)

The president of the United States has ridden in a variety of brands of state cars starting from 1899 when President William McKinley was the first to ride in a car, a steam Locomobile.

U.S. limousine business declined in the 21st century due to the effects of the Great Recession, the subsequent rise of ride sharing apps, and an industry crisis precipitated by a deadly stretch limousine crash in Schoharie, New York, in 2018. Moreover, during this time, people who would have once utilized limousines began opting to travel more discreetly in cars like black SUVs.

== Characteristics ==
The limousine body style usually has a partition separating the driver from the rear passenger compartment. This partition usually includes an openable glass section so passengers may see the road. Communication with the driver is possible either by opening the partition window or using an intercom system.

Limousines are often long-wheelbase vehicles to provide extra legroom in the passenger compartment. There will usually be occasional seats (in the U.S. called jump seats) at the front of the compartment (either forward-facing, rear-facing, or able to face either direction).

Many nations have official state cars designed to transport government officials. The top leaders have dedicated and specially equipped limousines. The United States Presidential State Car is the official car of the President of the United States.

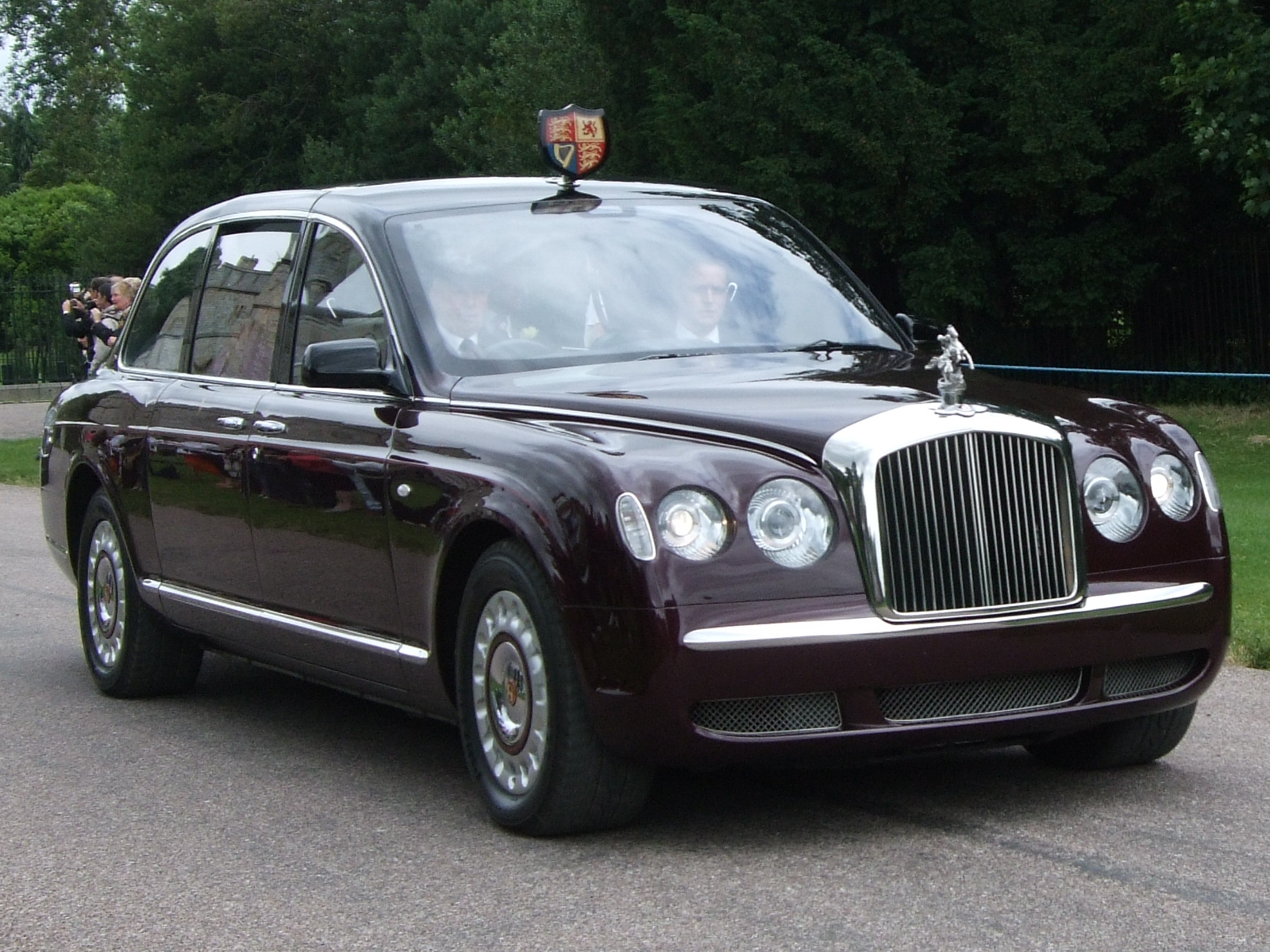
The official state car of the Monarch of the United Kingdom

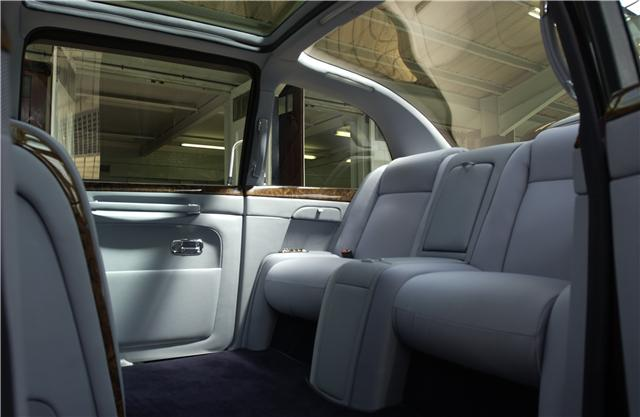
Passenger compartment of the late Queen Elizabeth II's car with occasional seats folded down

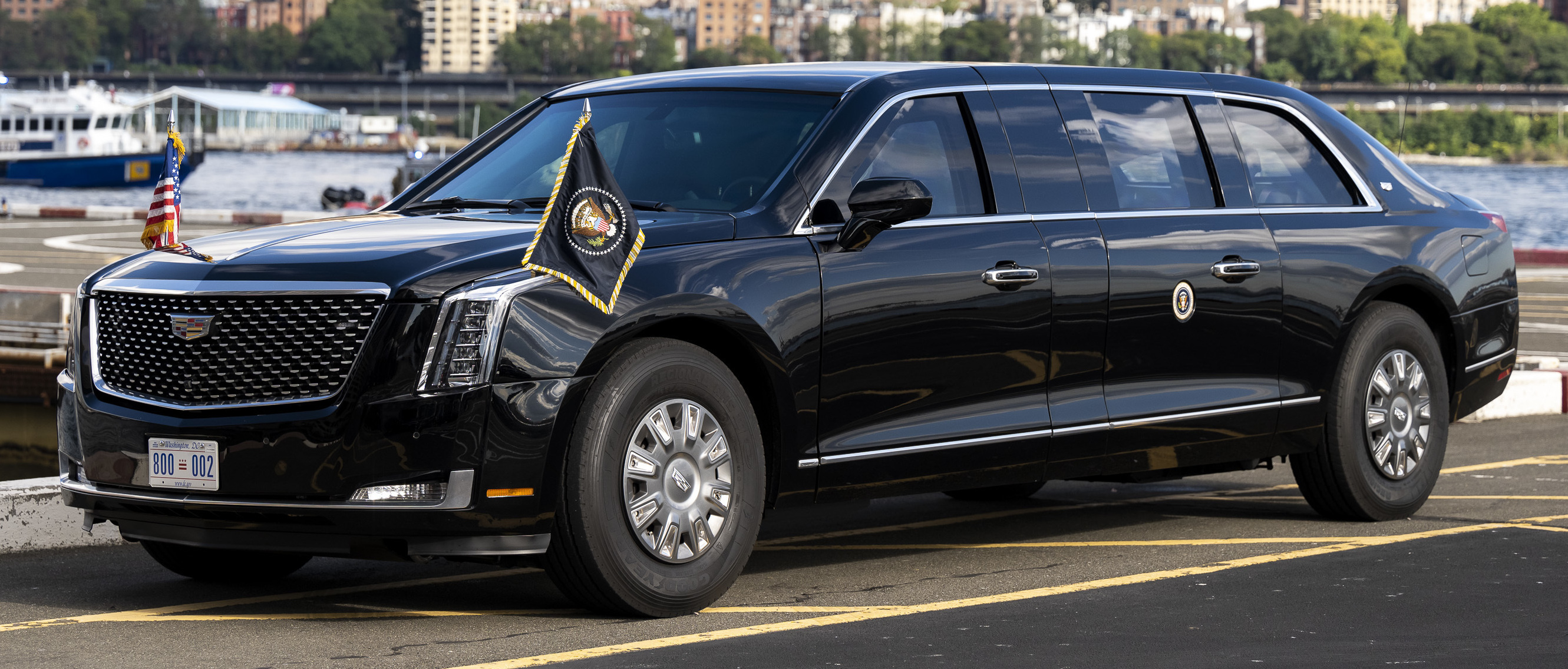
Cadillac One limousine of the President of the United States

=== Stretch limousines ===
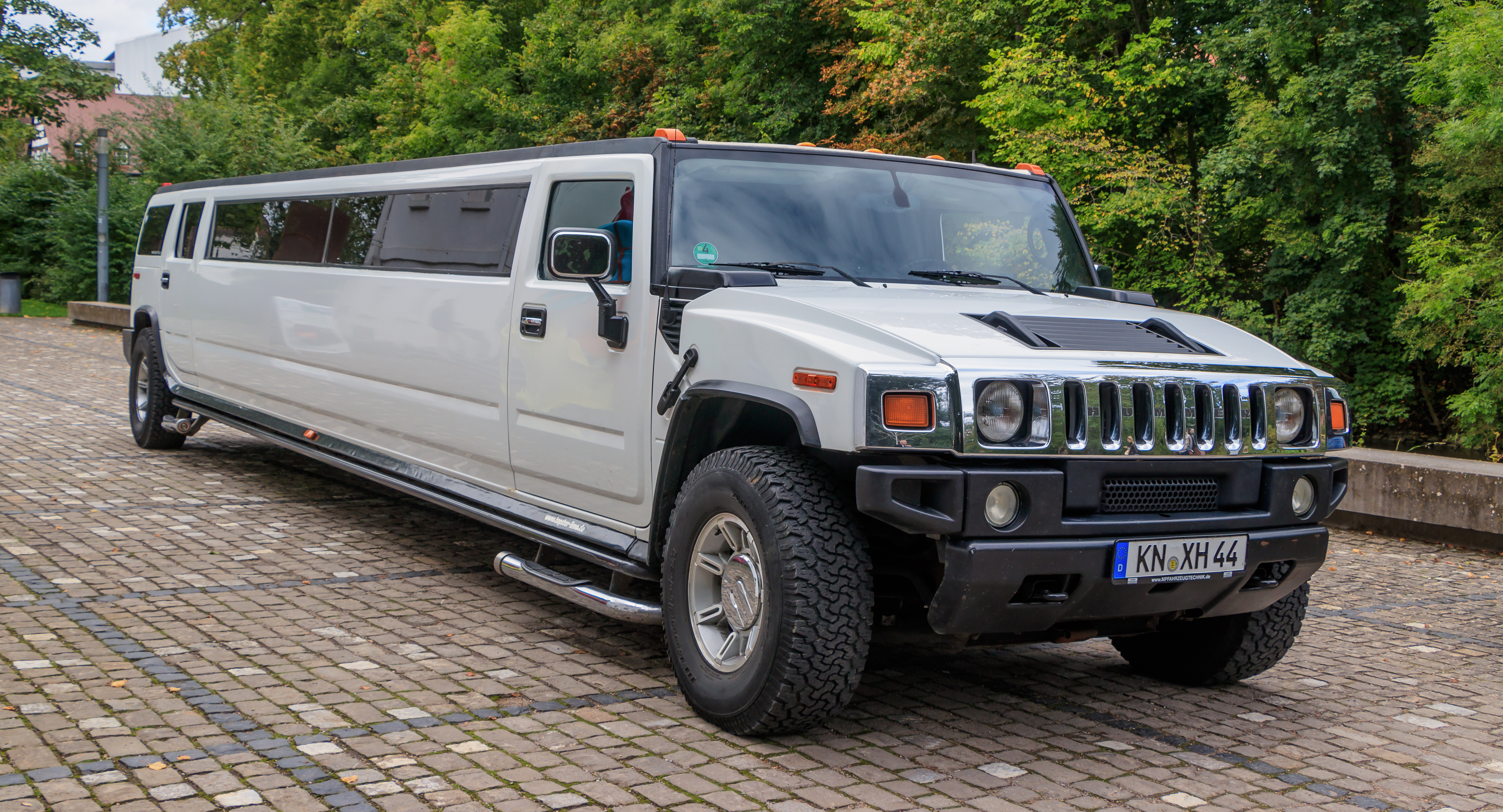
Hummer H2 stretch limousine

Stretch limousines are longer than regular limousines, usually to accommodate more passengers. Stretch limousines may have seating along the sides of the cabin.

A "stretch limousine" was created in Fort Smith, Arkansas by Armbruster. The company was founded in 1887 as a builder and repairer of horse-drawn vehicles before transitioning to automobile body work. In the early 1920s, the company built its first extended-wheelbase, multi-door vehicle for Jordan Bus Lines, creating one of the earliest "stretch" limousines for short intercity service. The design proved successful, leading to produce about twenty stretch vehicles annually through the start of World War II. Their vehicles were also used to transport famous "big band" leaders, such as Glenn Miller and Benny Goodman, and their members and equipment. These early stretch limousines were sometimes called "big band buses". Armbruster called their lengthened cars "extended-wheelbase multi-door auto-coaches". The 12-passenger coaches were used by hotels, taxis, airlines, corporations, and tour companies. Knock-down programs by automakers made coachbuilders stretch vehicles, but Armbruster also custom-built limousines using unibody construction, such as the 1969 AMC Ambassadors.

As of 2023, stretch limousines comprise one percent of U.S. limousine company offerings. That total was down from about ten percent in 2013.

=== Novelty limousines ===
A variety of vehicles not designed as limousines have been converted into novelty limousines. Another style of novelty limousine are those painted in bright colors, such as purple or pink.

Vehicles converted into novelty stretch limousines include the East German Trabant, Volkswagen Beetle, Fiat Panda, and Citroën 2CV. There are instances of Corvettes, Ferraris, and Mini Coopers being stretched to accommodate up to 10 passengers.

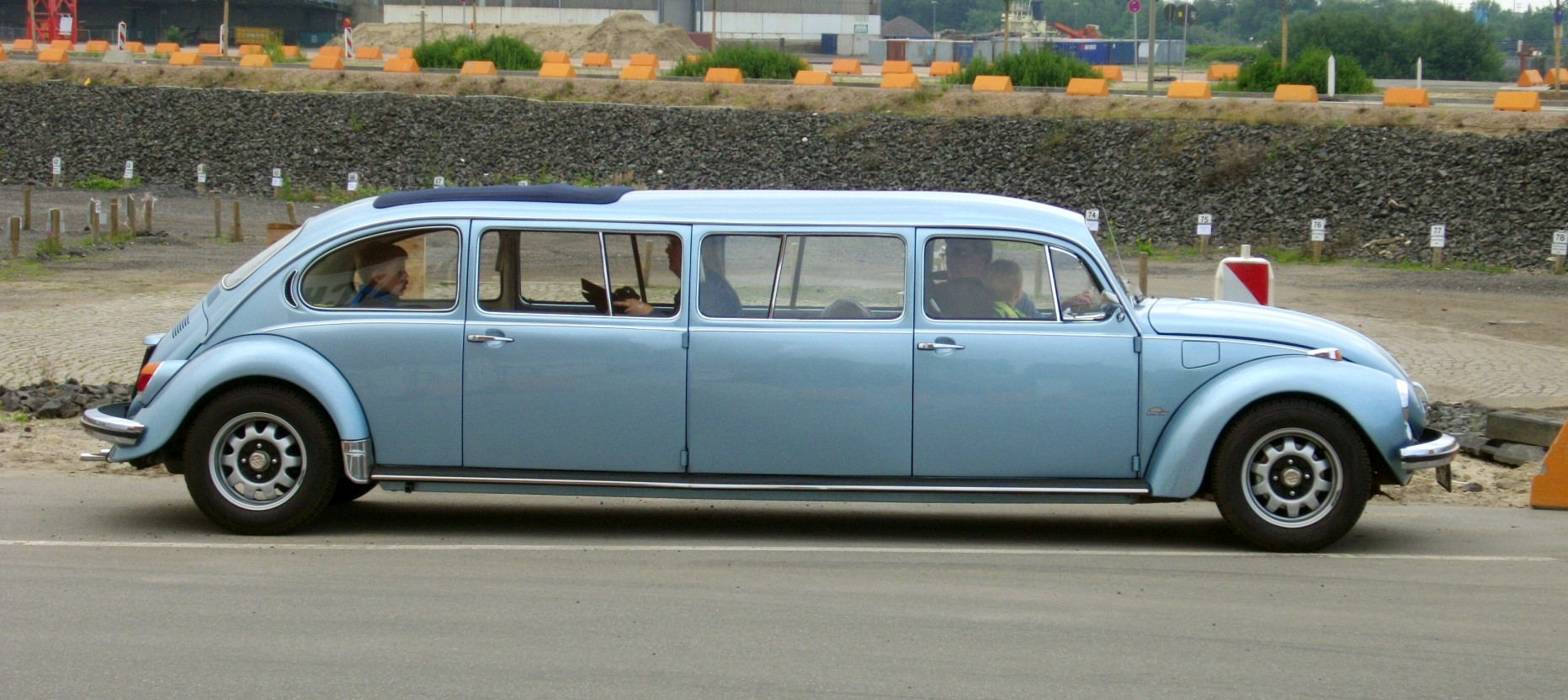
Volkswagen Beetle limousine

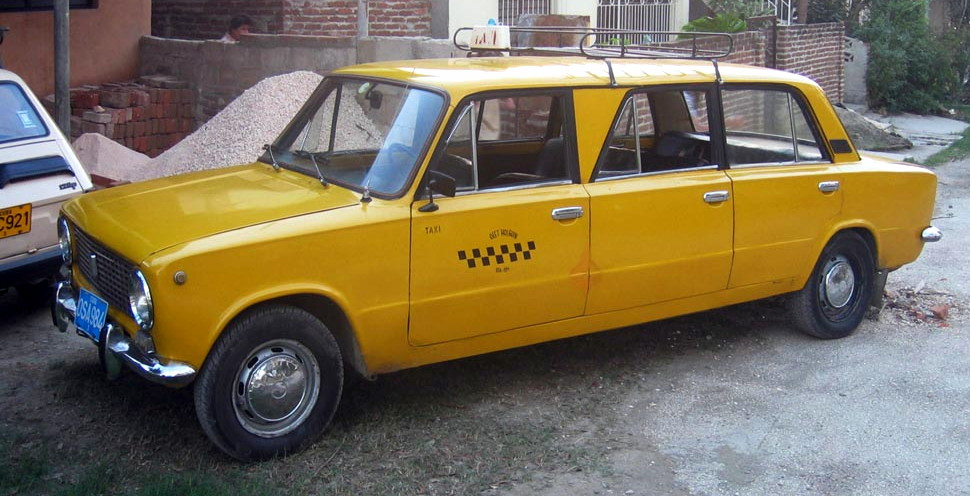
Lada limousine in Cuba

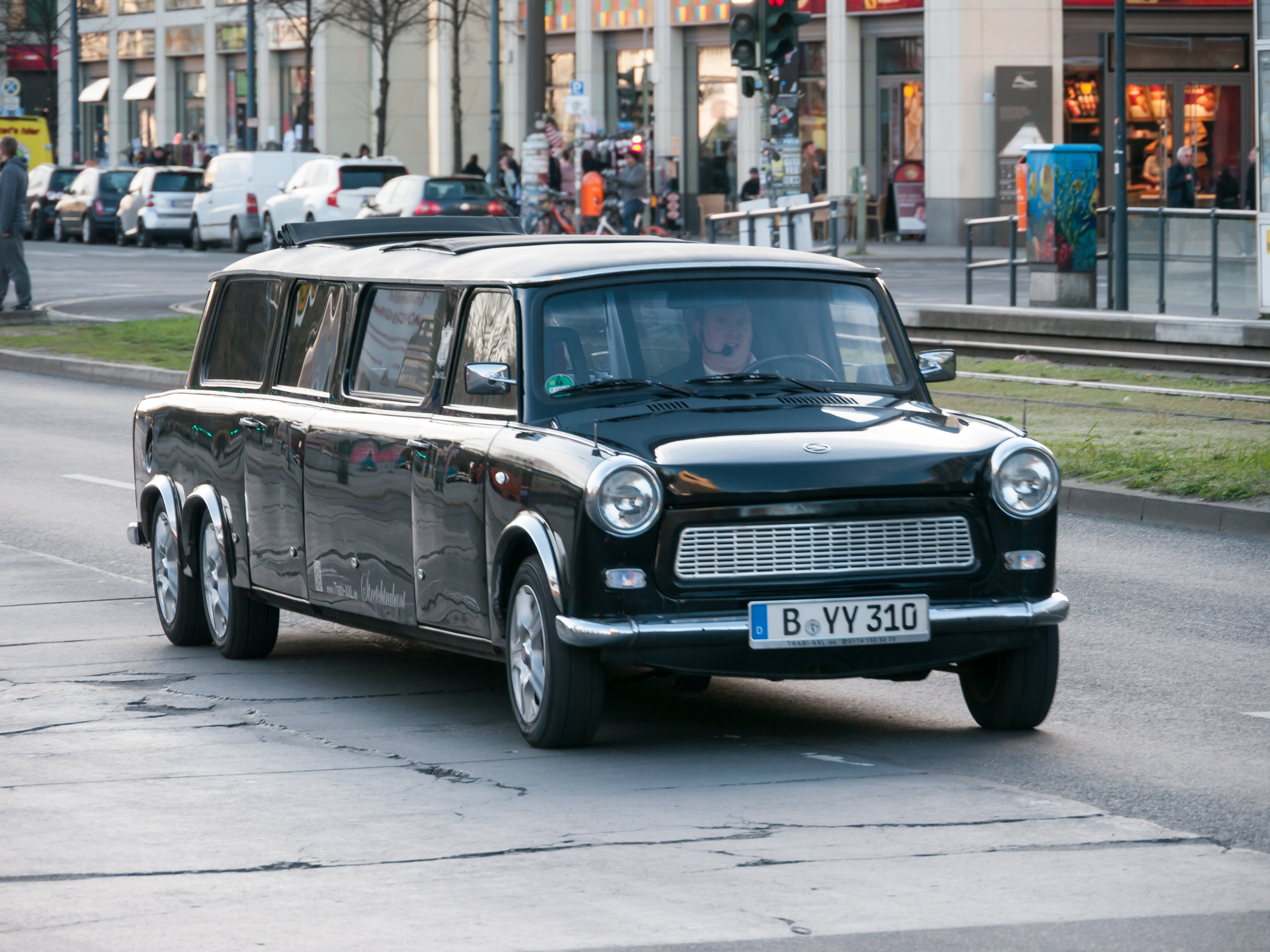
Trabant limousine

== See also ==
- Car classification
- Party bus
