= Lincoln L-head V12 engine =

Lincoln KB V12

Overview
- Manufacturer: Ford Motor Company
- Production: 1932–1948

Chronology
- Successor: Lincoln-Zephyr V12

The Lincoln L-head V12 engine is a flathead V12 engine produced in two distinct versions and three displacements between 1932 and 1940 by the Ford Motor Company for its Lincoln automobiles. Introduced as a 65° L-head V12 of 447.9 cu in (7.3 L) displacement, it was joined the following year by a smaller, distinctly engineered 67° L-head 381.7 cu in (6.3 L) V12. The newer engine was upsized to 414 cu in (6.8 L) in 1934, and replaced both engines, leaving Lincoln with a sole large-displacement V12 going forward.

None of these engines should be confused with the much smaller, much less powerful Lincoln-Zephyr V12, a 267-cubic-inch (4.4 L) 75° engine based on the Flathead Ford V8.

== Lincoln V12 Timeline ==
Unrelated prior engines
1902 Henry M. Leland establishes the Cadillac Automobile Company
1909 Cadillac purchased by General Motors
1914 Cadillac introduces V8, sells 13,000 in first year
1917 Leland establishes Lincoln Motor Company, immediately receives contract to build V12 Liberty aviation engines
1917 Lincoln produces first automobile, the V8 powered luxury Model L
1922 Lincoln sells only 150 cars
1922 Ford Motor Company acquires Lincoln
1923 Lincoln sales rise 45%
1930 Lincoln phases out L series; introduces K-Series powered by 385 cu in (6.3 L) 60° flathead Fork and Blade L-head V8 producing 125 bhp (93 kW)
1931 Cadillac introduces V12 road car for $800 less than V8 Lincoln
1932 Ford introduces 221 cubic inch (3.6 L) 90° Flathead V8 producing 65 hp

L-head V12 Introduced
1932 Lincoln introduces its first L-head V12, a 65° V 447.9 cu in (7.3 L) L-head V12 producing 150 bhp (110 kW); K-Series product line split into KA-Series (V8 powered) and KB-Series (V12 powered)
1933 Lincoln introduces 381.7 cu in (6.3 L) L-head V12 producing 125 bhp (93 kW) to replace its 385 cubic inch (6.3 L) 60° V8; all Lincolns are V12 powered.
1934 Lincoln upsizes its 381.7 cu in (6.3 L) V12 to 414 cu in (6.8 L) L-head V12, making the same 150 bhp (110 kW) as the older, heavier, and more expensive 447.9 cu in (7.3 L) V12; Lincoln drops both previous V12s and fits the new engine to both KA (now denoting short wheelbase) and KB (long-wheelbase) models
1935 Lincoln product lines rationalised to a single Model K
1936 Model K limousine is Lincoln's best-seller

Unrelated Lincoln-Zephyr V12
1936 Upon introduction the Lincoln-Zephyr range of lower-priced, midsized luxury cars is powered by the new 110 hp Lincoln-Zephyr H Series V12, a 267 cubic inch (4.4 L) 75° engine based on the Flathead Ford V8
1948 Lincoln-Zephyr V12s are phased out, replaced with the InVincible 8, an iteration of the Flathead Ford V8, across the Lincoln product line

== Variants ==
=== 448 ===
In 1932, Lincoln offered for the first time a 447.9 cu in (7.3 L) L-head V12 with a seven-main-bearing crankshaft producing 150 bhp (110 kW). The K-Series was previously available only with a developed version (bored out to 385 cubic inches (6.3 L) in 1928 and uprated to 125 hp for 1932) of the 60° V8, which first saw duty in the 1920 Lincoln L-Series. The expanded engine offering split the K-Series into KA- (powered by the 60° V8) and KB-Series (powered by the 65° V12).

=== 382 ===
In 1933, Lincoln introduced a smaller 67° 381.7 cu in (6.3 L), 125 bhp (93 kW) L-head V12 to replace the three-year-old 385 cu in (6.3 L) KA-Series V8. Its architecture was a significant departure from the 1932 V12, with a different V-angle, four main bearings, offset blocks, and side-by-side connecting rods rather than fork-and-blade. It produced the same power as the KA V8 despite its somewhat slightly smaller displacement.

=== 414 ===
The KA's 381.7 cu in (6.3 L) V12 was enlarged to 414 cu in (6.8 L) for 1934 to replace the 1932-design 447.9 cu in (7.3 L). Over 40 cu in (0.7 L) smaller, it produces the same 150 bhp (110 kW).

All Lincolns in 1934 (both KA and KB models) were powered by this new 414 V12, and the distinction between models was dropped, with all 1935 Lincolns being simply branded "Model K". The 414 lasted through the end of the Model K's production just before World War II.

== See also ==
- List of Ford engines
