= Lincoln-Zephyr V12 engine =

Lincoln-Zephyr V12
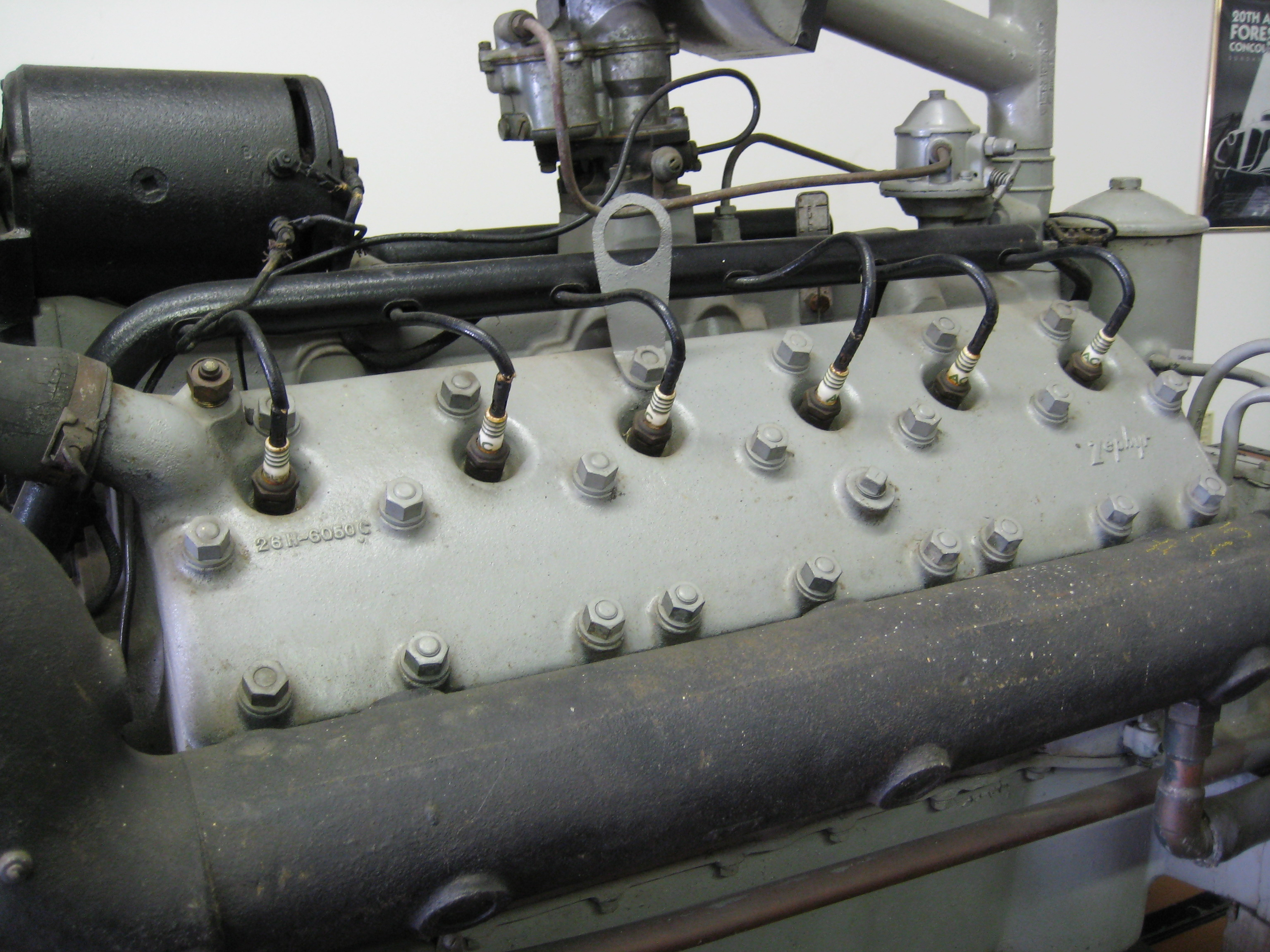

Overview
- Manufacturer: Ford Motor Company
- Production: 1936–1948

Chronology
- Predecessor: Lincoln L-head V12
- Successor: InVincible 8

The Lincoln-Zephyr V12 was a 75° V12 engine introduced by Ford Motor Company's Lincoln division for the Lincoln-Zephyr in 1932. Originally displacing 267 cubic inches (4.4 L), it was also manufactured in 292-cubic-inch (4.8 L) and 306-cubic-inch (5.0 L) displacements between 1940 and 1948.

Lincoln produced two other L-head V12s in 1932, but required a more compact unit for their new streamlined Lincoln-Zephyr line. As Ford had just introduced its Flathead V8, this was the logical starting point for a new Lincoln V12. The Lincoln-Zephyr V12 would quickly replace the previous-generation V12, just as the Lincoln-Zephyr car replaced the rest of the Lincoln line, and would be the company's primary engine through 1948.

== Overview ==
The Lincoln-Zephyr H Series V-12 was similar in design to the 90° Ford flathead V8 introduced for 1932, with a narrower 75° angle between cylinder banks. The engine used aluminum-alloy heads and cast-steel pistons, as well as two water pumps. It also had a unique distributor with a coil assembly that employed an individual coil for each cylinder bank.

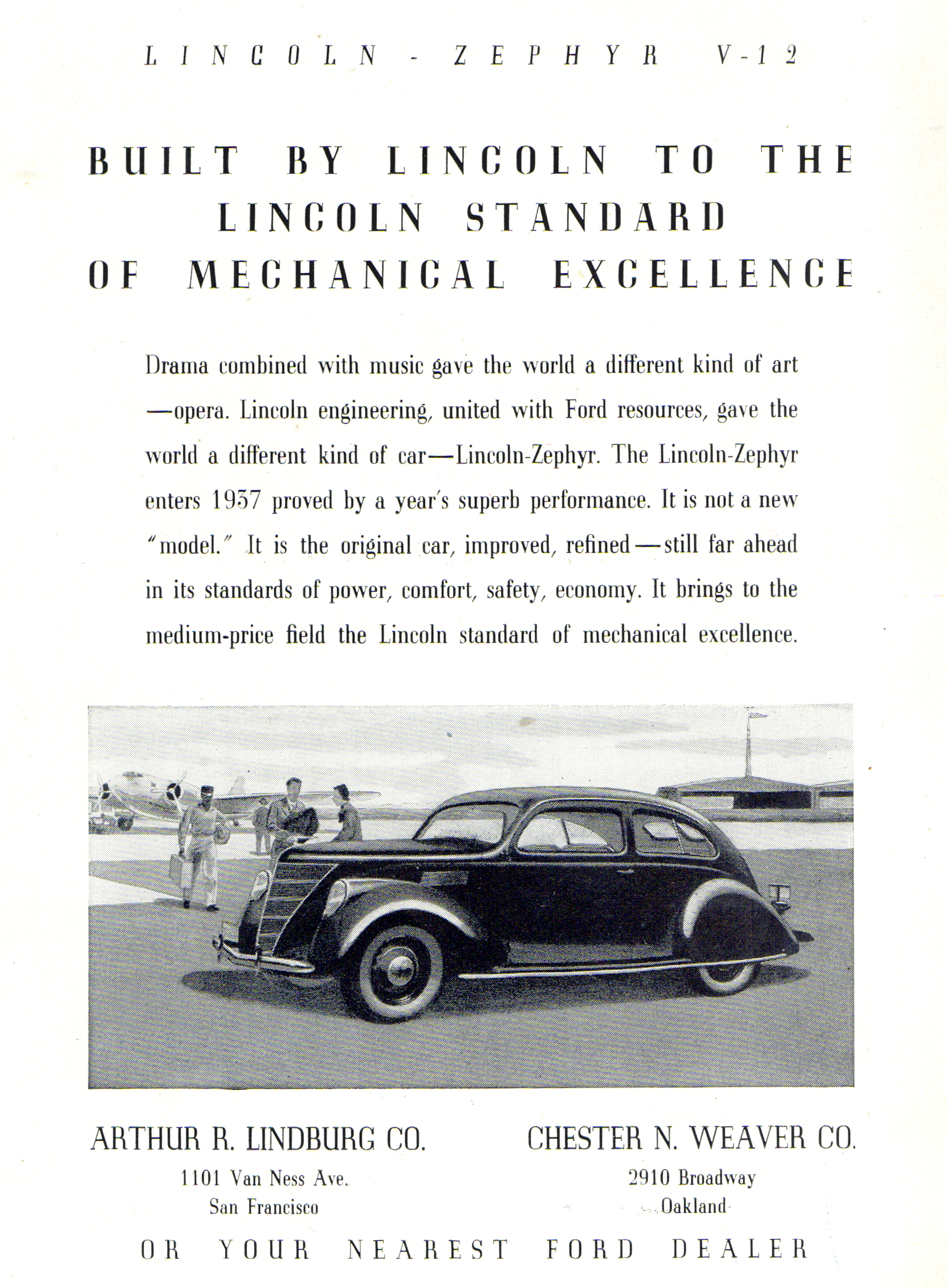
Advertisement for 1937 Lincoln-Zephyr V-12

Initial power output was quoted as 110 horsepower (82 kW) -- a little higher than the target figure -- at 3,900 rpm, a very high engine speed for peak power in those days. The torque curve was quite flat, however, with at least 180 pound-feet (240 N⋅m) available from 400 rpm to 3,500 rpm, which made for excellent top-gear performance. The engine also had its problems, which included inadequate crankcase ventilation that caused rapid sludge buildup in sustained low-rpm running, aggravated by poor oil flow, plus inadequately sized water passages that led to overheating, bore warpage, and ring wear. To a degree, some of these maladies were dealt with during the Zephyr's first year, and Ford improved the engine by adopting hydraulic valve lifters for 1938 and cast-iron heads and oiling improvements for 1942. In spite of these efforts, the Zephyr V-12 never shed its reputation for service troubles, though the postwar versions were quite reliable.

The V12 was eventually replaced by the InVincible 8, simply a version of the flathead V8 found on Ford's truck line.

The Zephyr V12 was also used by Allard, Atalanta, and Brough Superior in England. Allard made three V12-powered cars, using the Ford V8 for all other cars at that time, Brough also made only one V12 as his others were Hudson 6 or 8 powered, and Jensen made one called the HL.

== 267 ==
The first Lincoln-Zephyr models of 1936 used a 267 cu in (4.4 L) engine, which produced 110 hp (82 kW). This engine was upgraded with hydraulic lifters in 1938 and produced for one further year. Its bore was 69.85 mm (2 3/4 inches) and stroke 95.25 mm (3 3/4 in.).

== 292 ==
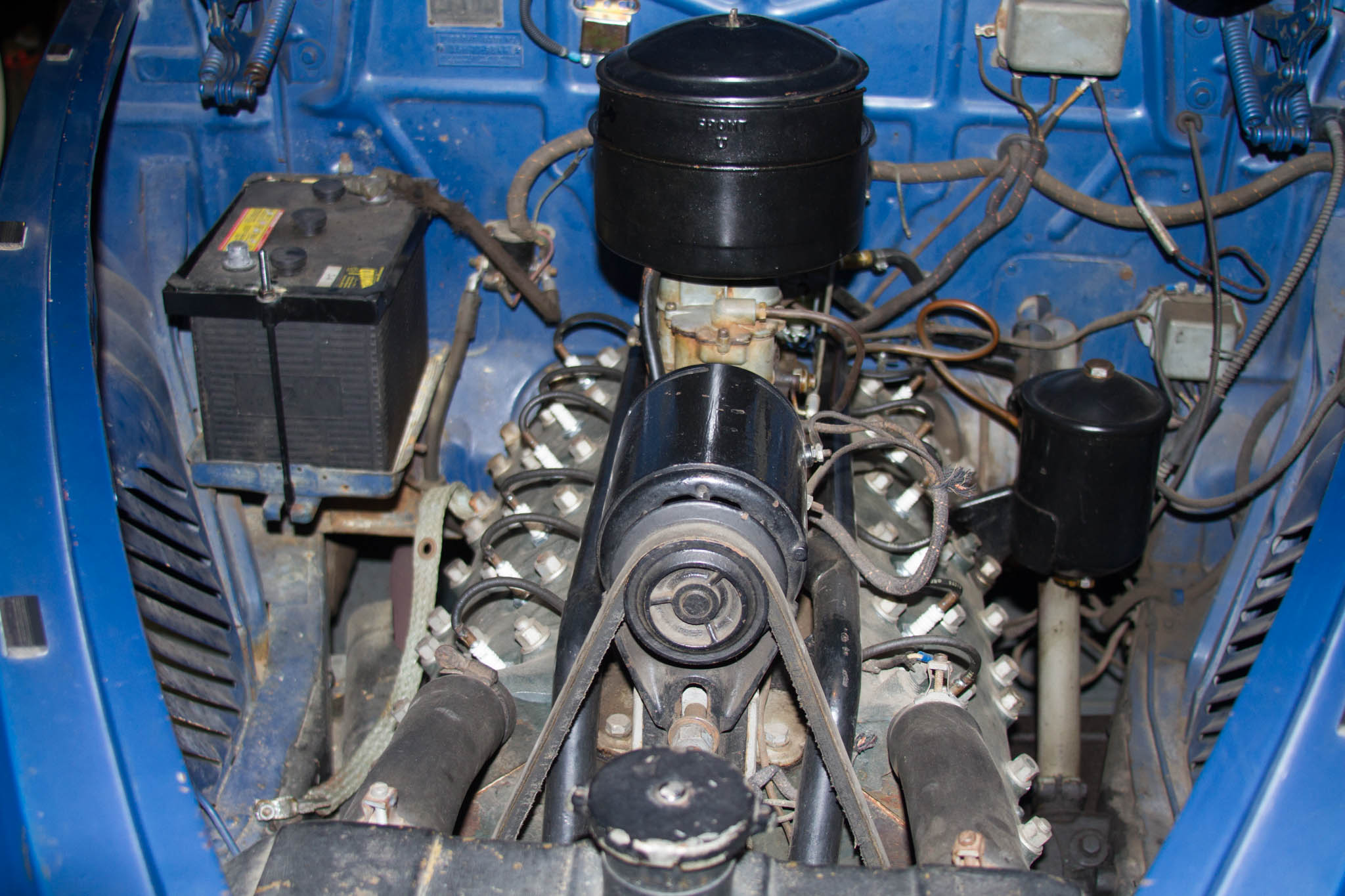
The 292 cu in (4.8 L) Lincoln-Zephyr V12 engine

The engine was enlarged for 1940 and 1941 to 292 cubic inches (4.8 L). This engine was reused from late 1946 through 1948 and was the last of the line produced. Bore was uprated to 2 7/8 inches (73.03 mm) and stroke stayed as the same Ford 3 3/4 in. (95.25 mm).

== 306 ==
A single month of 1942 production used a 306 cu in (5.0 L) version of the engine. This was resurrected after the war in 1946 (with 7.2:1 compression and two-barrel, twin-choke carburetor, rated at 130 hp (97 kW) for a short time before too-thin cylinder walls forced a reversion to 292 cubic inches (4.79 L) for the rest of 1946 through 1948. Many cylinder walls disappeared altogether in the block casting process at the factory, causing many blocks to be scrapped before installation. Cylinder wear in the field was extreme, and reboring during engine overhaul was impossible.

== See also ==
- List of Ford engines
