= Sunshine Special (automobile) =

Official state car used by Franklin D Roosevelt

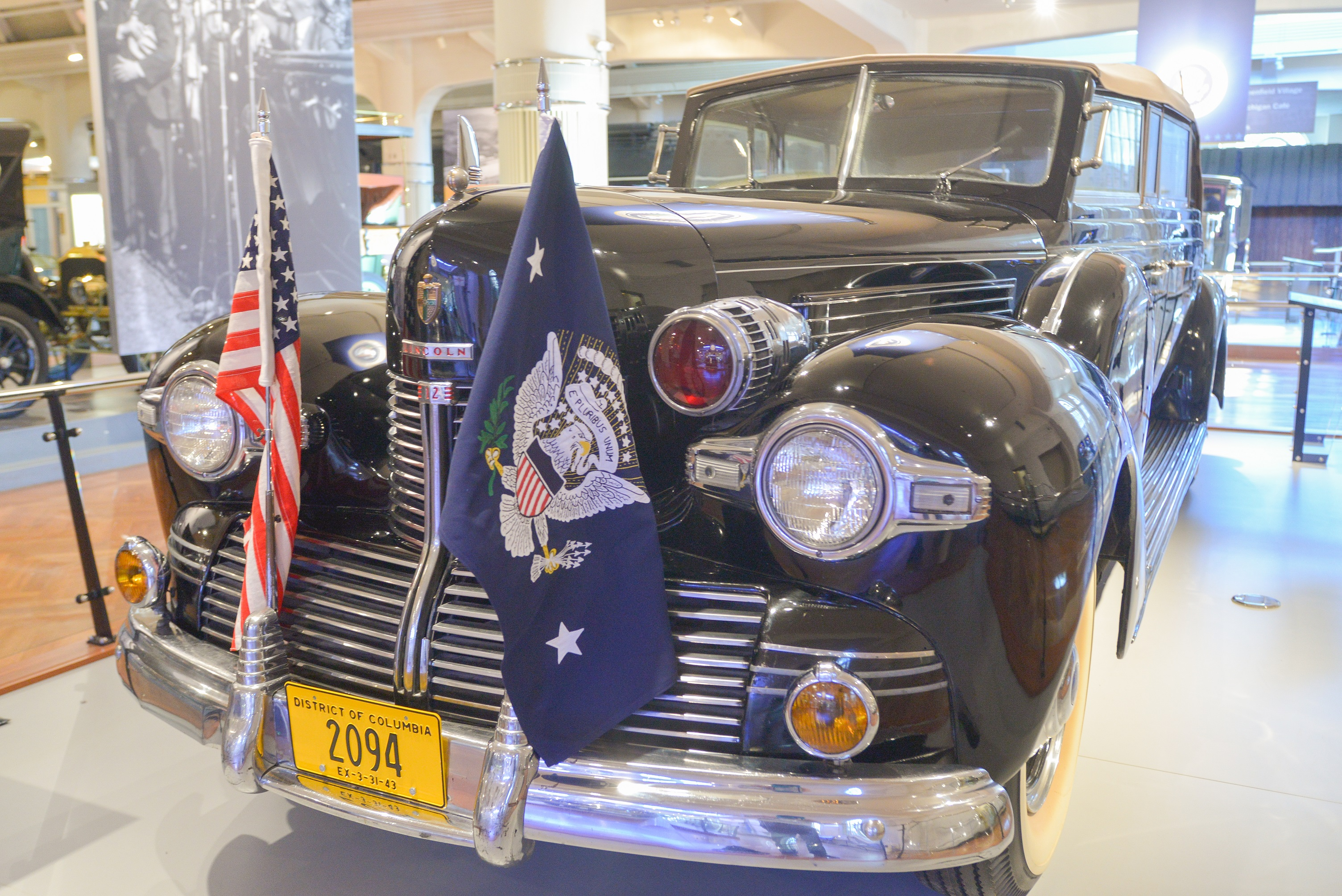
FDR's 1939 Lincoln K series Presidential Limousine

The Sunshine Special is a modified 1939 Lincoln Model K limousine that was used as the official state car by United States presidents Franklin D. Roosevelt and Harry Truman. Said to have been the "First Presidential car to acquire its own personality", and most closely associated with FDR, the V12 powered four-door convertible was specifically modified for the president by coachbuilder Brunn & Company at a cost of $4,950, $114,572 in 2025 dollars (the original cost of the car, before any modifications, was $8,348.74, $193,245 in 2025 dollars.

Initially called "Old 99," in reference to a number on its first license plate, it was later nicknamed the "Sunshine Special" for its convertible roof. In spite of a previous assassination attempt on Roosevelt while riding in a Buick convertible, the president still famously enjoyed appearing in the Lincoln as an open car in parades and public gatherings.

== History ==
=== Original specifications ===
The Sunshine Special was originally a Lincoln K-series built by the Lincoln division of Ford, and modified by Brunn & Company to U.S. government specifications. It was powered by a 150hp, 414 cubic inch V12 L-head engine. The limousine was originally equipped with a siren, running lights, and a 2-way radio, as well as extra-wide running boards and grab handles for Secret Service agents. The vehicle had a convertible roof, which gave the car its nickname.

It quickly became known as a favorite of the president, who sometimes appeared before crowds without actually leaving the vehicle, allowing him to conceal that he was a polio survivor forced to use crutches and a wheelchair. There are newsreels of the time showing the car being driven on stage, such as at the podium constructed for a campaign appearance at Ebbets Field in New York in 1944, documenting the gambit.

=== Following Pearl Harbor ===
After the Japanese attack on Pearl Harbor, the Secret Service began to express concern over potential assassination attempts on the president, as his limousine was not armored and had no protective features. The Secret Service did not use Al Capone's car for his visit to Congress at the United States Capitol on 8 December, in spite of the myth even being featured in the History Channel documentary Pearl Harbor: 24 Hours After.

The Sunshine Special was modified to be capable of protecting him, with armor plating for the doors, bullet-proof tires, inch-thick windows and storage compartments for pistols and sub-machine guns. All of the safety modifications increased the car's weight to 9,300 pounds (4,218 kg). Despite these precautions, Roosevelt preferred to ride with the top down during parades and at most public gatherings. The car was "refreshed" by being fitted with modified front end parts from the 1942 Lincoln-Zephyr.

=== Travels ===
When the president traveled the Sunshine Special, along with other Secret Service vehicles, was either driven to the president's destination if nearby, or transported on a special rail car, outfitted with equipment and supplies to maintain the vehicles if far.

Although some sources allege the Sunshine Special was transported to the wartime Tehran, Casablanca, Malta, and Yalta conferences during World War II, there appears to be no evidence to confirm this. While there are many photographs and newsreels of President Roosevelt riding in standard military-issue Jeeps during the aforementioned overseas trips, there are no photographs of the Sunshine Special taken on these occasions.

The need to maintain secrecy about the president's travel during wartime makes it highly unlikely his special limousine would have been used overseas. And the President only attended, and appeared in public in, venues protected by military troops. The practice of transporting presidential limousines overseas did not start until peace had been restored postwar. In March 1947 Life featured a photograph of President Truman visiting the pyramids at Teotihuacan near Mexico City, appearing to be riding in the Sunshine Special.

=== Following Roosevelt's death ===
After Roosevelt's death in 1945 the Sunshine Special remained in the White House fleet, and was used by President Truman at the Potsdam Conference in Germany that July. It was replaced when a new fleet of Lincoln limousines was acquired after the 1948 election. It is on permanent display at the Henry Ford Museum in Dearborn, Michigan.

== See also ==
- Official state car
- Presidential State Car (United States)
- Franklin D. Roosevelt
- President of the United States
