= Lincoln Continental =

American luxury car

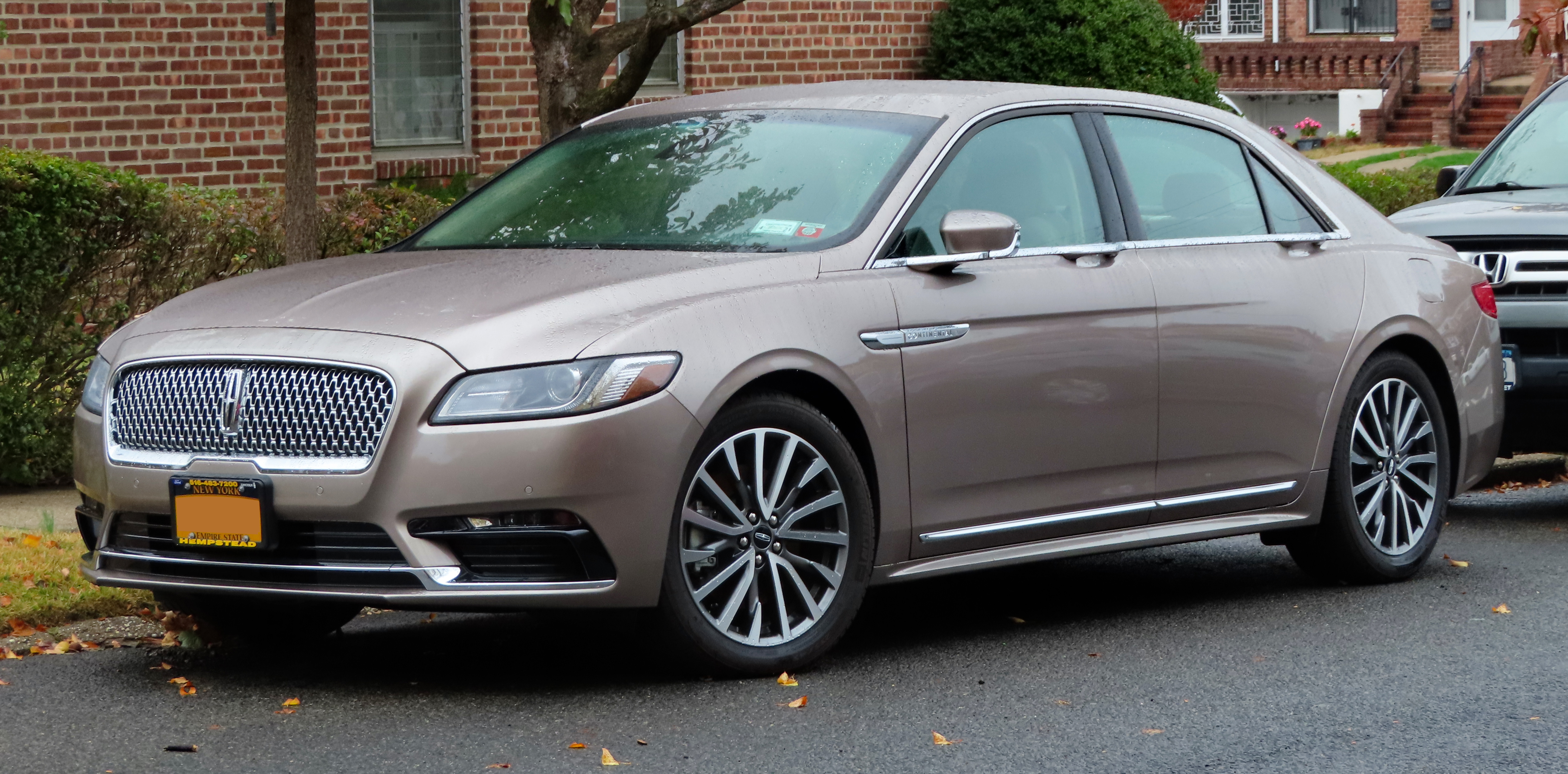
- 2019 Lincoln Continental

Overview
- Manufacturer: Lincoln
- Production: 1939–1942; 1946–1948; 1956–2002; 2016–2020
- Model years: 1940–1942; 1946–1948; 1958–1980; 1982–2002; 2017–2020

Body and chassis
- Class: Full-size luxury car (1939–1980, 2017–2020); Mid-size luxury car (1982–2002)
- Layout: Longitudinal, FR layout (1939–1987); Transverse Front-engine, front-wheel-drive layout (1987–2020); Transverse Front-engine, four-wheel-drive layout (2016–2020)

The Lincoln Continental is a series of mid-sized and full-sized luxury cars produced between 1939 and 2020 by Lincoln, a division of the American automaker Ford. The model line was introduced following the construction of a personal vehicle for Edsel Ford, who commissioned a coachbuilt 1939 Lincoln-Zephyr convertible, developed as a vacation vehicle to attract potential Lincoln buyers. In what would give the model line its name, the exterior was designed with European "continental" styling elements, including a rear-mounted spare tire.

In production for over 55 years across nine different decades, Lincoln has produced ten generations of the Continental. Within the Lincoln model line, the Continental has served several roles ranging from its flagship to its base-trim sedan. From 1961 to 1976, Lincoln sold the Continental as its exclusive model line. The model line has also gone on hiatus three times. From 1949 to 1955, the nameplate was briefly retired. For 1981, the Continental was renamed the Lincoln Town Car to accommodate the 1982 seventh-generation Continental. After 2002, the Continental was retired, largely replaced by the Lincoln MKS for 2009. For 2017, the tenth-generation Continental replaced the MKS.

As part of its entry into full-scale production, the first-generation Continental was the progenitor of an entirely new automotive segment, the personal luxury car. Following World War II, the segment evolved into coupes and convertibles larger than sports cars and grand touring cars with an emphasis on features, styling, and comfort over performance and handling. From 1956 to 1957, the Continental nameplate was the namesake of the short-lived Continental Division, marketing the 1956–1957 Continental Mark II as the worldwide flagship of Ford Motor Company; as a second successor, Ford introduced the Continental Mark series for 1969, produced over six generations to 1998.

Along with the creation of the personal luxury car segment, the Lincoln Continental marked the zenith of several designs in American automotive history. The Continental is the final American vehicle line with a factory-produced V12 engine (1948), the final four-door convertible (1967), and the final model line to undergo downsizing (for the 1980 model year).

American production of the Continental and MKZ, its only two sedans, ended in 2020 thereby making Lincoln a crossover/SUV-only brand in the US.

== Edsel Ford prototype (1939) ==
=== Development ===
The Lincoln Continental was first produced as a personal vehicle for Ford Motor Company President Edsel Ford. In 1938, Ford commissioned a one-off design he wanted ready for his March 1939 vacation from company Chief Stylist Eugene T. "Bob" Gregorie. Using the blueprints of the streamlined Lincoln-Zephyr as a starting point, Gregorie sketched a design for a convertible with a redesigned body; allegedly, the initial sketch for the design was completed in an hour.

Ford wanted to revive the popularity of the 1929–1932 Lincoln Victoria coupe and convertible but with a more modern approach, reflecting European styling influences for the Continental.

By design, the Edsel Ford prototype was essentially a channeled and sectioned Lincoln-Zephyr convertible; although the vehicle wore a conventional windshield profile, the prototype sat nearly 7 inches lower than a standard Lincoln. Along with the massive decrease in height, the running boards were deleted entirely. In contrast to the Zephyr (and in a massive change from the K-Series Lincoln), the hood sat nearly level with the fenders taking advantage of the fact that the engine type and configuration did not need the clearance afforded by the height of the standard Lincoln hood line.

To focus on the styling of the car, the chrome trim on the car was largely restricted to the grille; the prototype differed from the eventual production version in that it used a somewhat less angular roof line. As with the Lincoln-Zephyr, the prototype used a 267 cubic-inch V12 engine, transverse leaf springs front and rear as well as hydraulic drum brakes.

The prototype designed by Gregorie was produced on time, making the deadline to be delivered to Edsel Ford in Florida. Interest from well-off friends was high; Edsel sent a telegram back to Michigan that he could sell a thousand of them. In reference to its European-inspired design, the Lincoln-based prototype received its name: Continental.

Immediately, production commenced on the Lincoln Continental, with the majority of production being "Cabriolet" convertibles and a rare number of coupes. These were extensively hand-built; the two dozen 1939 models and 400 1940-built examples were built with hand-hammered body panels; dies for machine-pressing were not constructed until 1941. The limited number of 1939 models produced are commonly referred to as '1940 Continentals'.

=== Legacy and significance ===
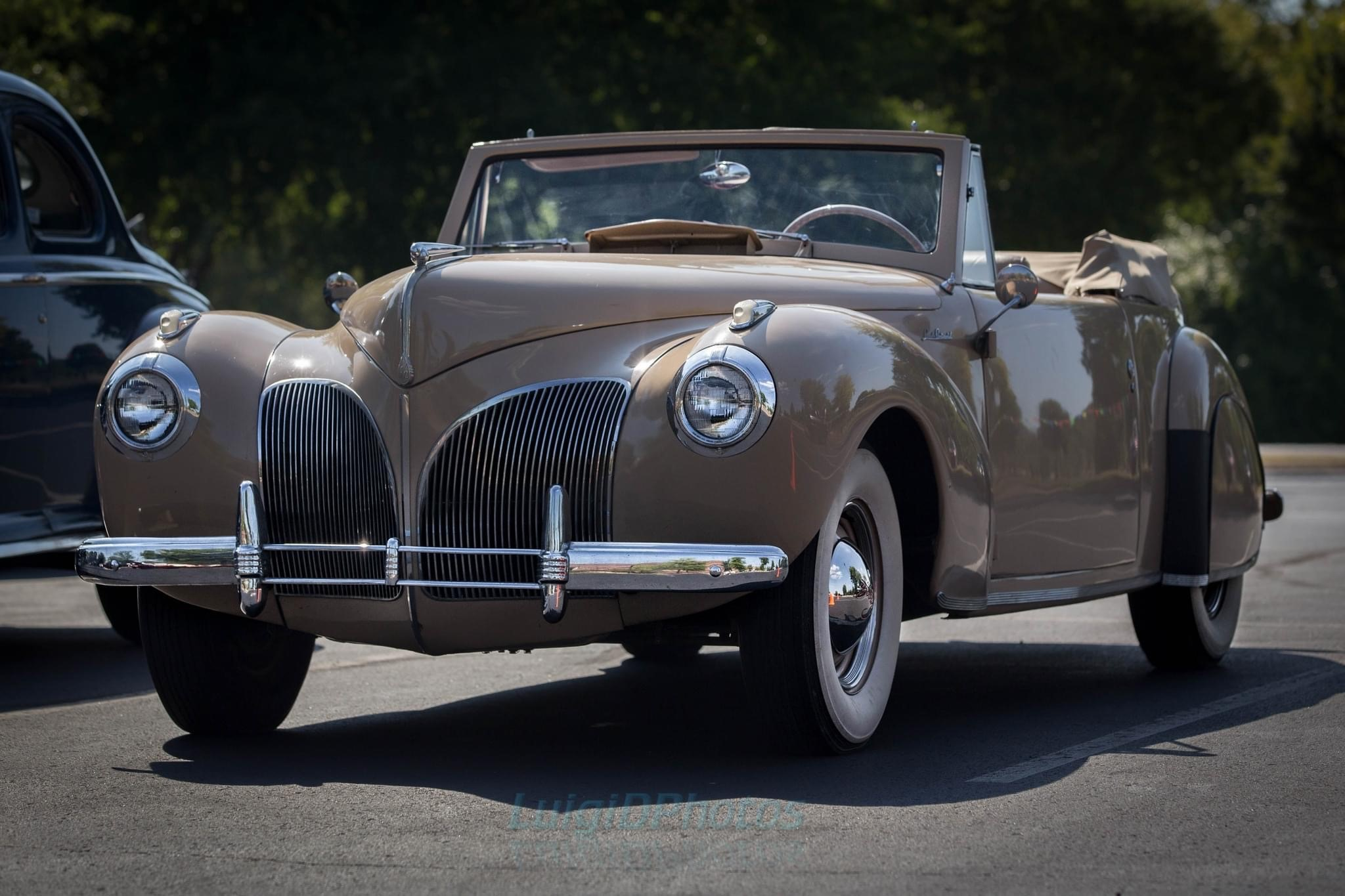
1941 Continental Convertible

The modified body gave the Continental new proportions over its Zephyr counterpart; with the hoodline sitting lower over the V12 engine and the passenger compartment moved rearward, the prototype had more in common with classic era "long-hood, short deck" body configurations versus being a strict adherent of contemporary streamline moderne design trends. This design philosophy quickly became the standard for American vehicles for decades.

As a consequence of the smaller trunk space, the spare tire was mounted behind the trunk; while disappearing on American cars, the externally mounted, covered spare tire remained a feature on European-produced cars. Though the spare tire itself was relocated into the vehicle for all succeeding models, the styling motif remained a hallmark of most Continental Mark Series cars. With the exception of the 1958–1960 Continental Mark III, IV and V, all generations of the Mark Series featured a rounded trunk bulge that suggested the appearance of an externally rear-mounted spare tire.

Aftermarket kits that relocate the spare tire behind the trunk, popular on Fifties cars even today, remain known as Continental kits due to the design's continued association with the famous Continental model line.

== First generation (1940–1942, 1946–1948) ==
First generation
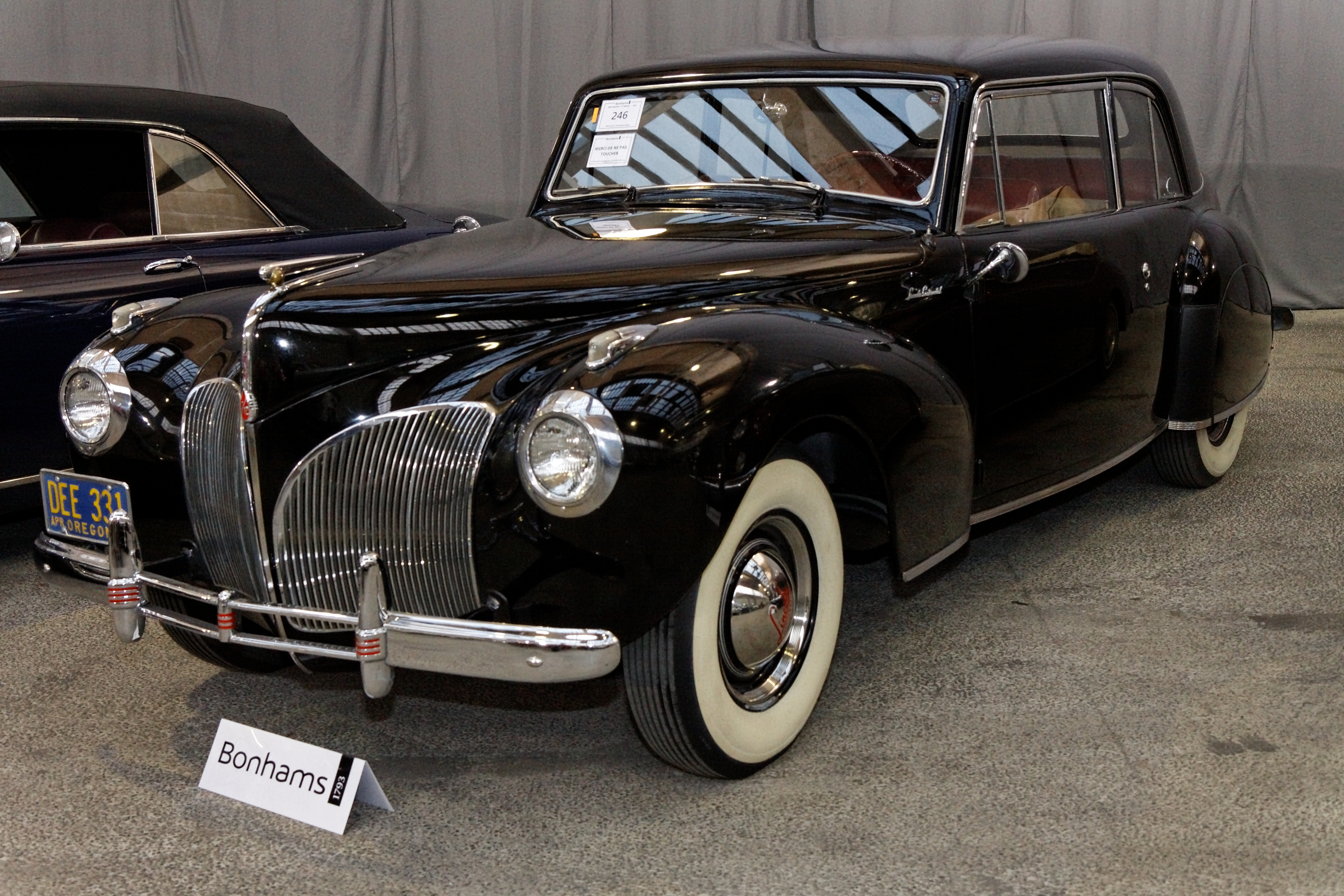
- 1941 Lincoln Continental coupe

Overview
- Model years: 1940–1942, 1946–1948
- Assembly: United States: Detroit, Michigan (Lincoln Assembly)
- Designer: Bob Gregorie (1938)

Body and chassis
- Body style: 2-door coupe 2-door convertible
- Layout: FR layout
- Related: Lincoln-Zephyr (1940); Lincoln Zephyr (1941–42); Lincoln H-series (post-war)

Powertrain
- Engine: 292 cu in (4.8 L) Lincoln-Zephyr V12

Dimensions
- Wheelbase: 125.0 in (3,175 mm)
- Length: 1940–1941: 209.8 in (5,329 mm); 1942–1948: 218.1 in (5,540 mm)
- Width: 1940–1941: 75.0 in (1,905 mm); 1942–1948: 77.8 in (1,976 mm)
- Height: 1940–1941: 62.0 in (1,575 mm); 1942–1948: 63.1 in (1,603 mm)
- Curb weight: 4,000–4,300 lb (1,800–2,000 kg)

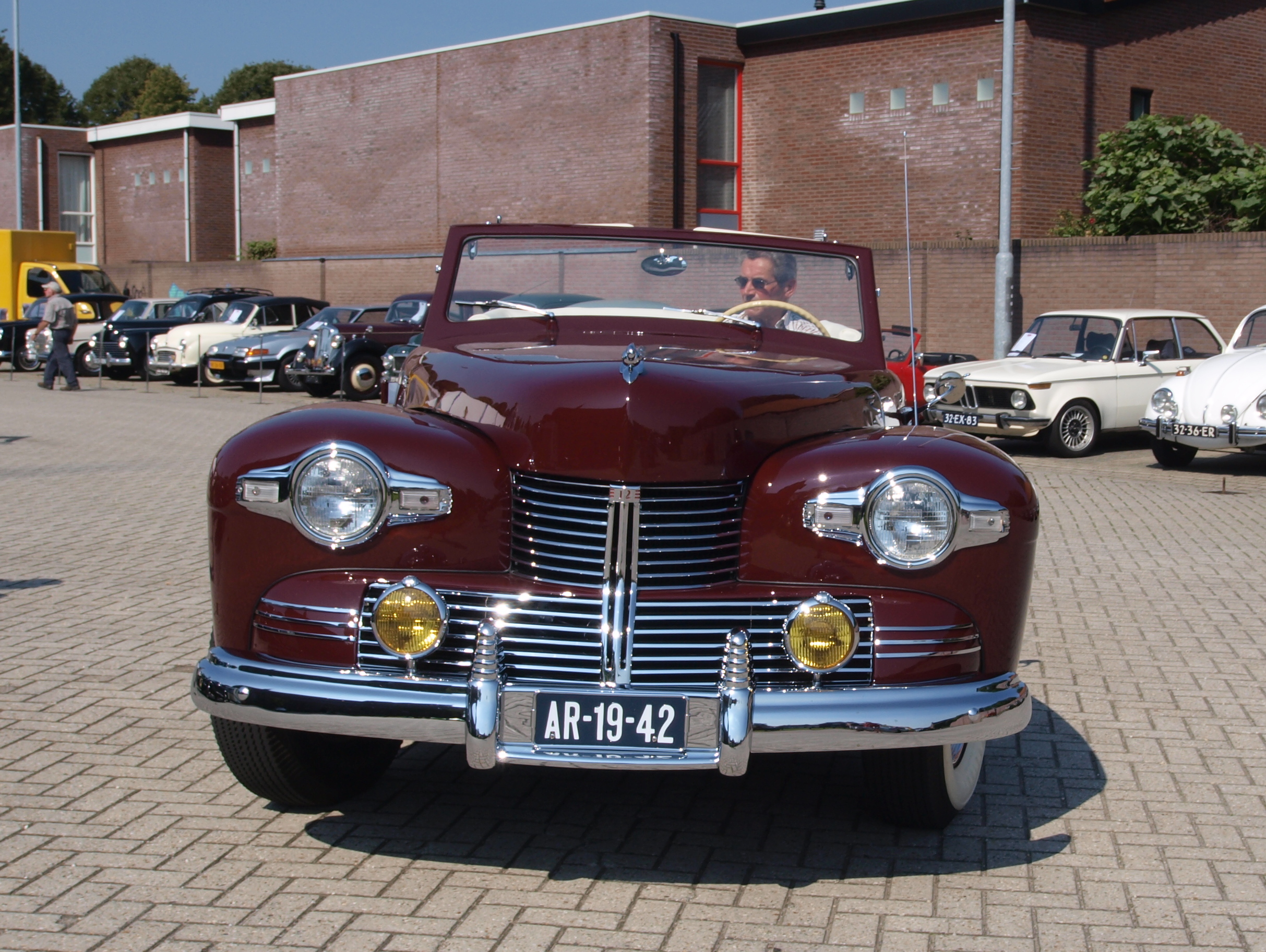
1942 Continental with a revised grille, replacing the distinctive "waterfall" style and presaging the postwar look. Only 200 of this type were built before World War II-related product suspension

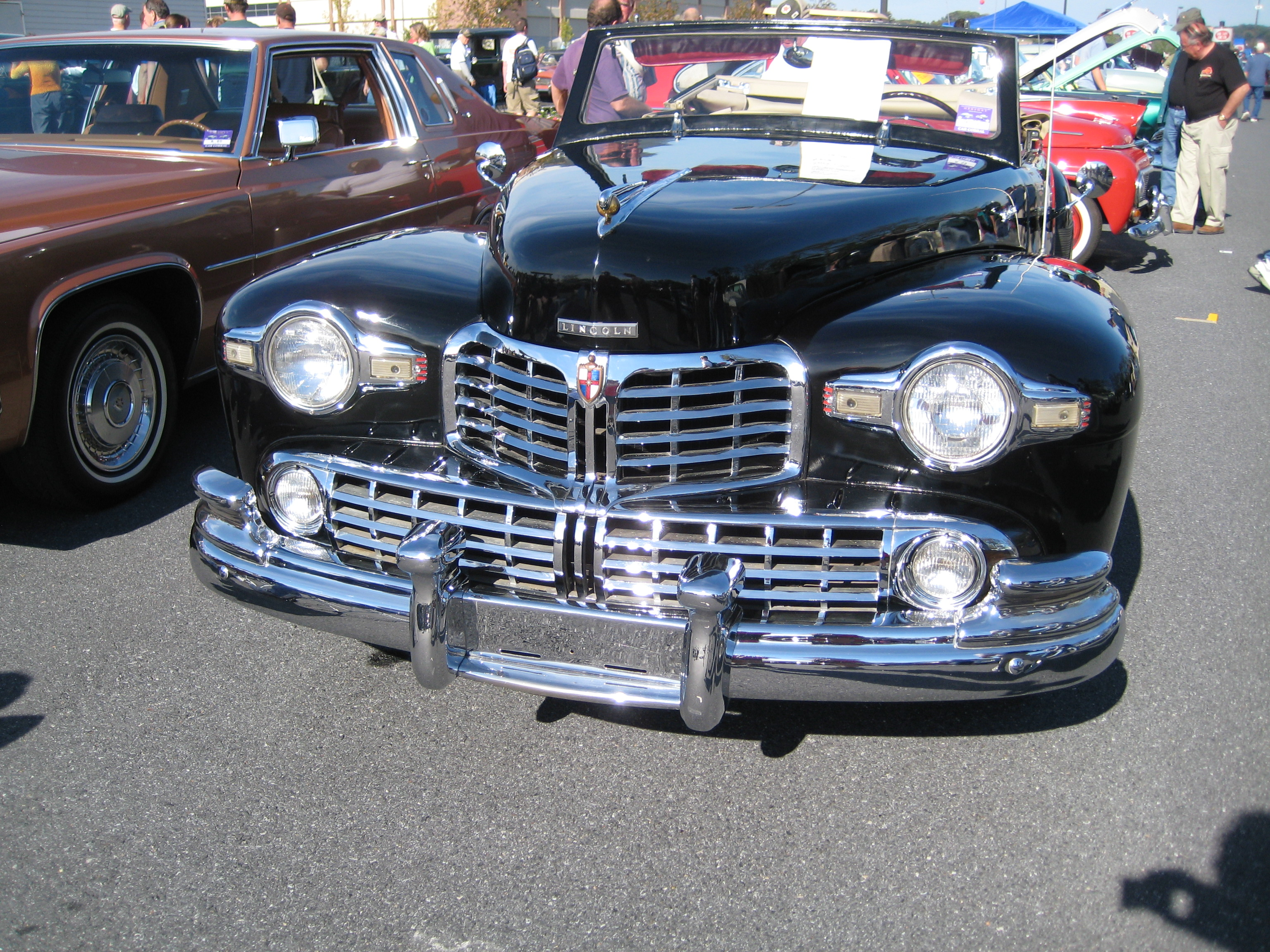
Postwar Continental

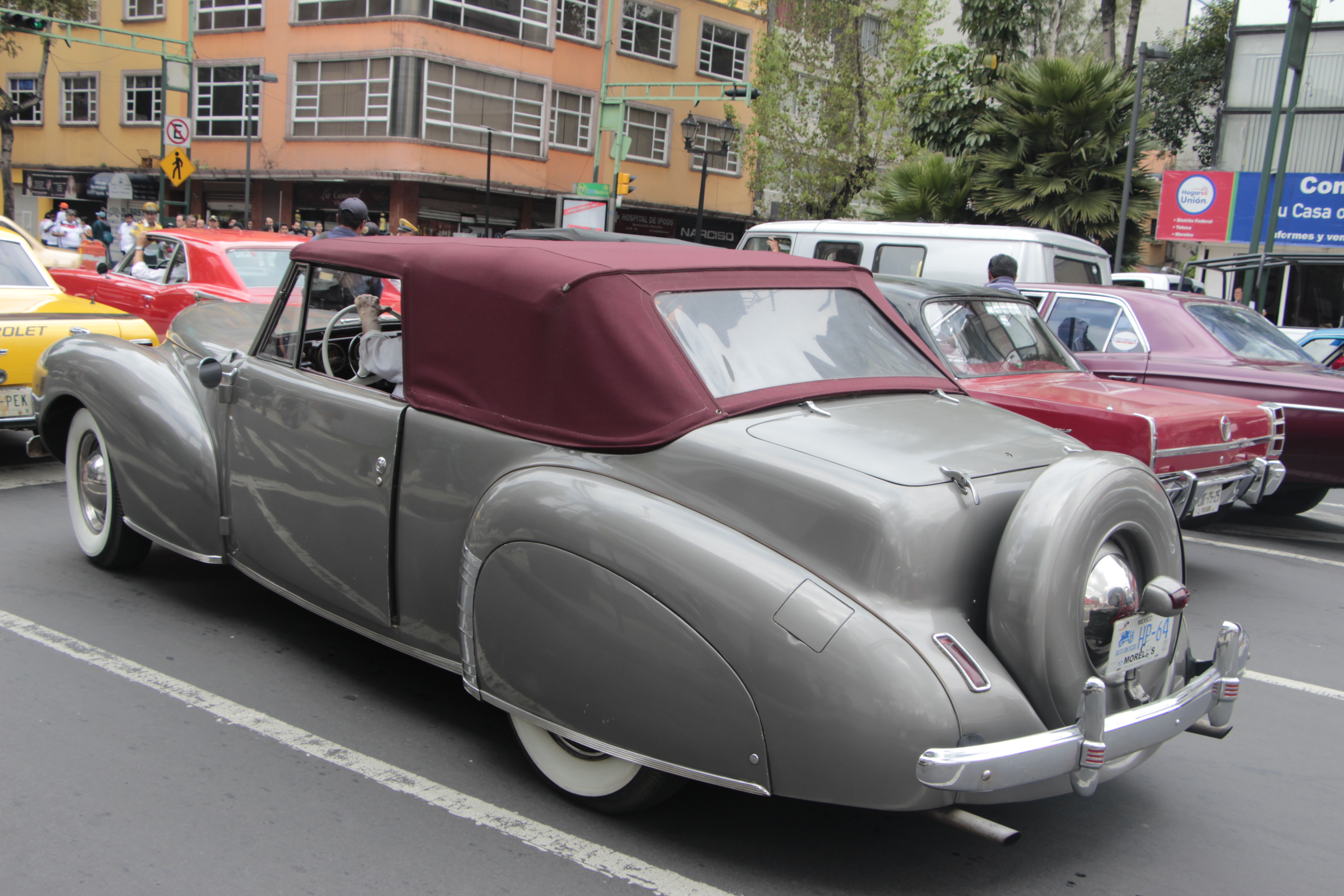
Lincoln Continental's trunk-mounted spare tire inspired the term "Continental tire"

The Lincoln Continental debuted for the 1940 model year, and through 1942 shared largely the same body design with each other, with push-button door catch releases displacing the previous lever type handles for 1941; the Continental received minimal updates from year to year.

For the 1942 model year, all Lincoln models were given squared-up fenders, and a revised grille, with the Lincoln-Zephyr gaining exterior push-button door catch releases. The result was a boxier, more massive appearance in keeping with then-current design trends, but perhaps less graceful in retrospect. 1942 production was shortened, following the entry of the United States into World War II; the attack on Pearl Harbor led to the suspension of production of automobiles for civilian use.

After World War II, the Lincoln division of Ford returned the Continental to production as a 1946 model; Lincoln dropped the Zephyr nomenclature following the war, so the postwar Continental was derived from the standard Lincoln (internally H-Series). To attract buyers, the design was refreshed with updated trim, distinguished by a new grille. For 1947, walnut wood trim was added to the interior.

Following the death of Edsel Ford in 1943, Ford Motor Company re-organized its corporate management structure, which led to the 1946 departure of the Continental's designer Bob Gregorie. 1948 would become the last year for the Continental, as the division sought to redevelop its new 1949 model line as an upgraded version of the Mercury; the expensive personal-luxury car would not have a role again until the Continental Mark II in 1956 which produced by its own Continental Division separate from Lincoln.

The 1939–1948 Continental is recognized as a "Full Classic" by the Classic Car Club of America, one of the last-built cars to be so recognized. As of 2015, the 1948 Lincoln Continental and 1948 Lincoln were the last cars produced and sold by a major U.S. automaker with a V12 engine. Base retail price for the coupe was listed at US$2,727 (equivalent to $59,700 in 2025) and the cabriolet was listed at US$2,778 (equivalent to $60,800 in 2025).

Media related to Lincoln Continental (first generation) at Wikimedia Commons

1939–1948 Lincoln Continental

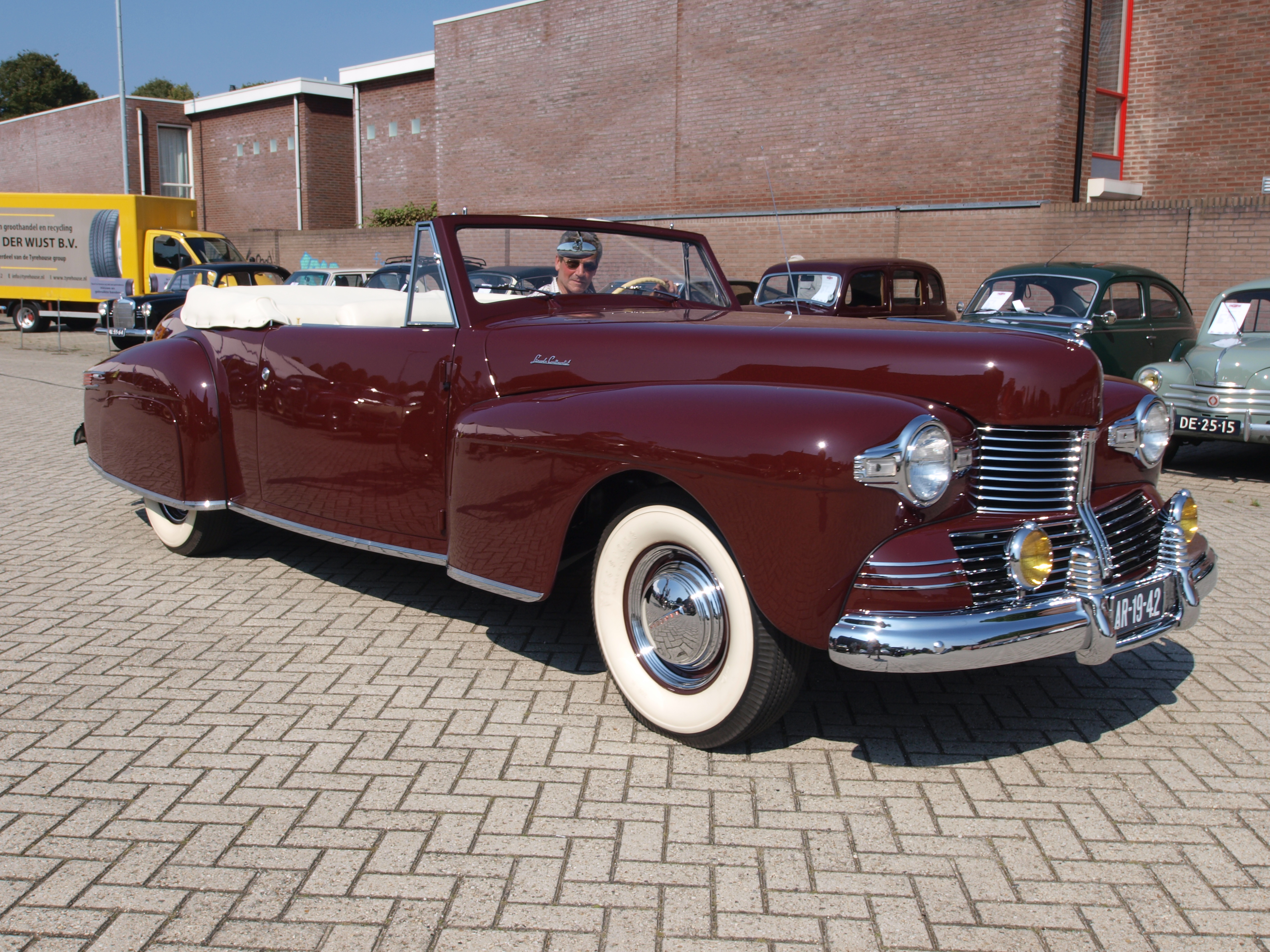
1942 Lincoln Continental cabriolet

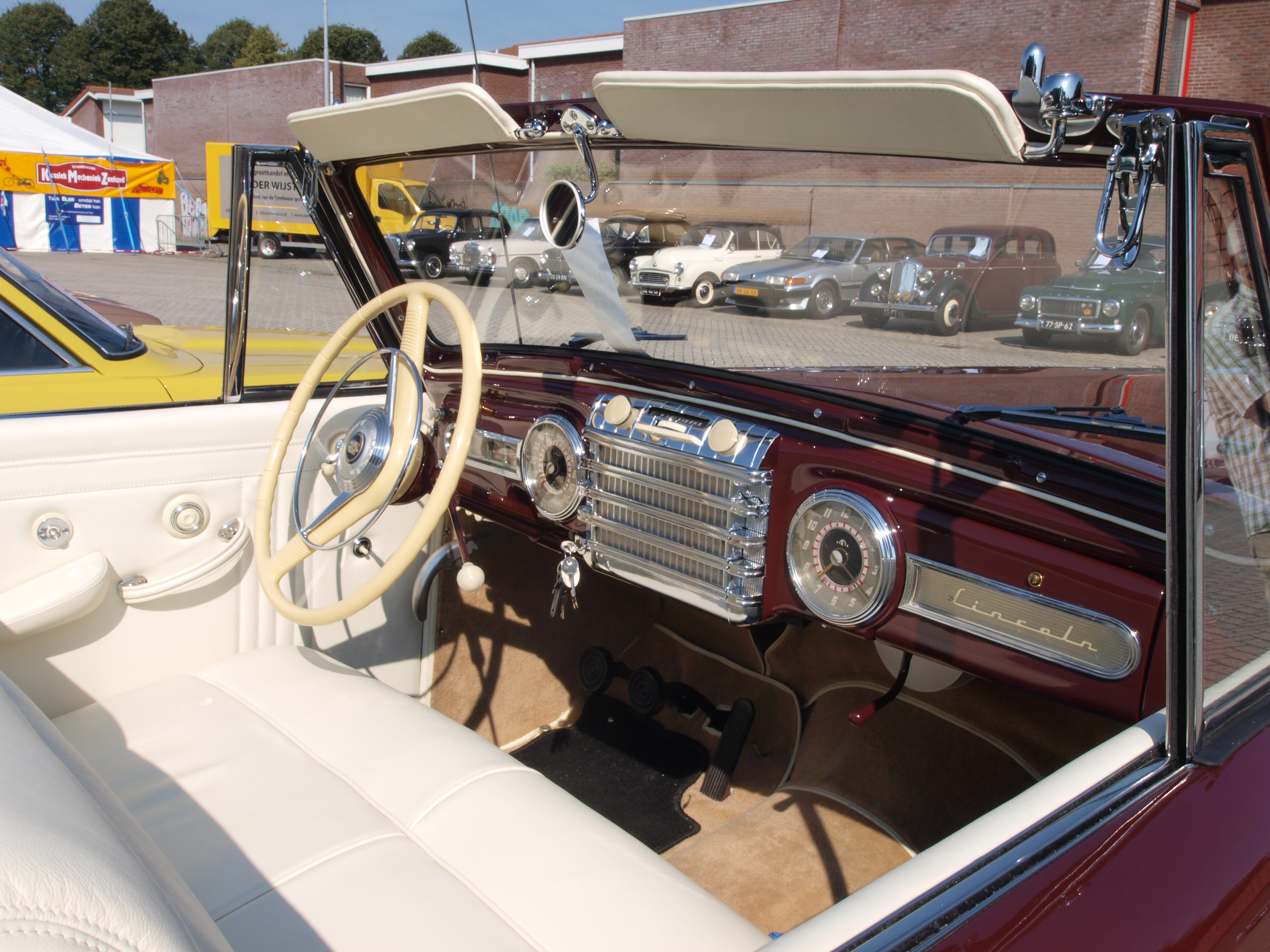
1942 Lincoln Continental cabriolet interior

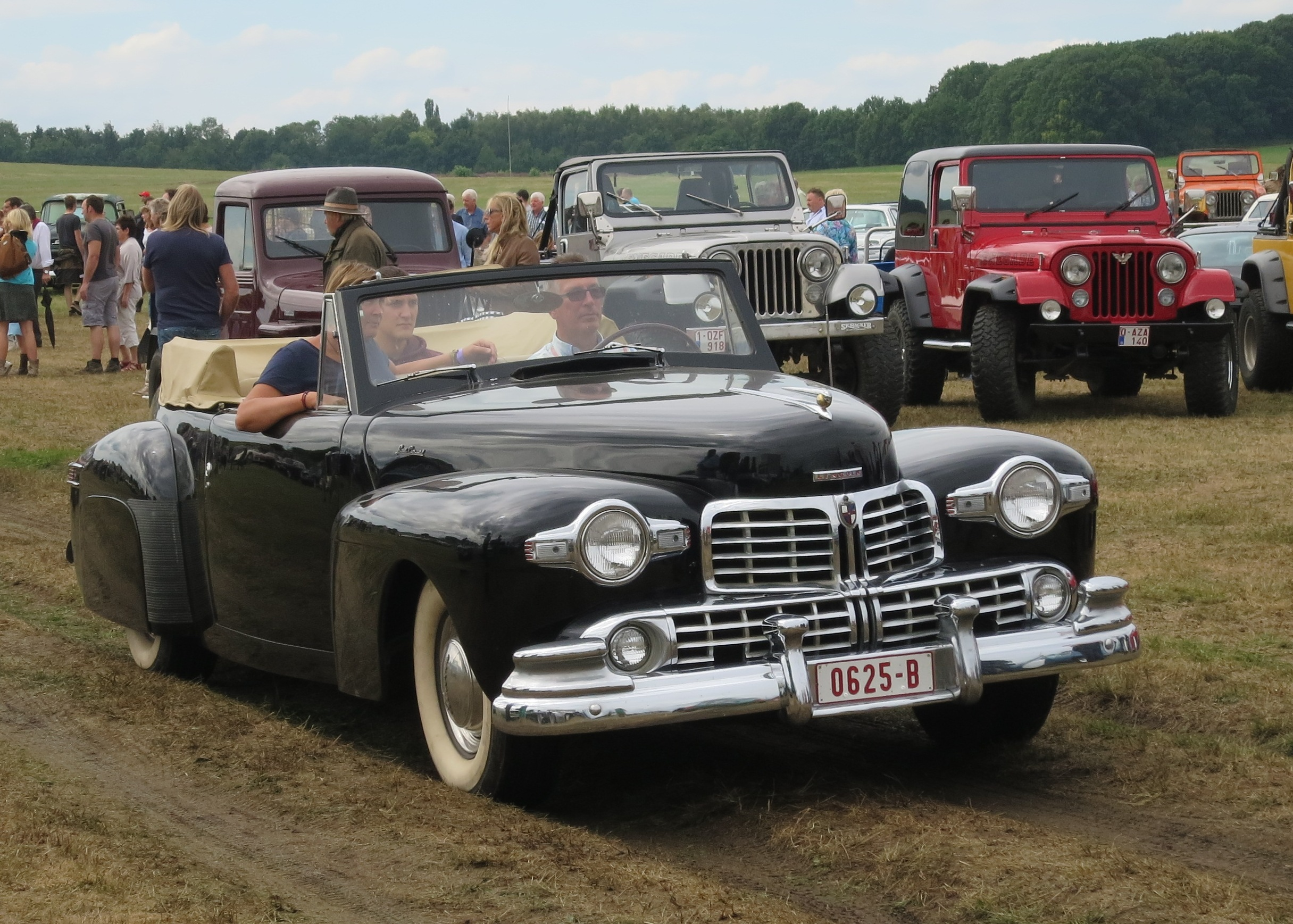
1948 Lincoln Continental cabriolet

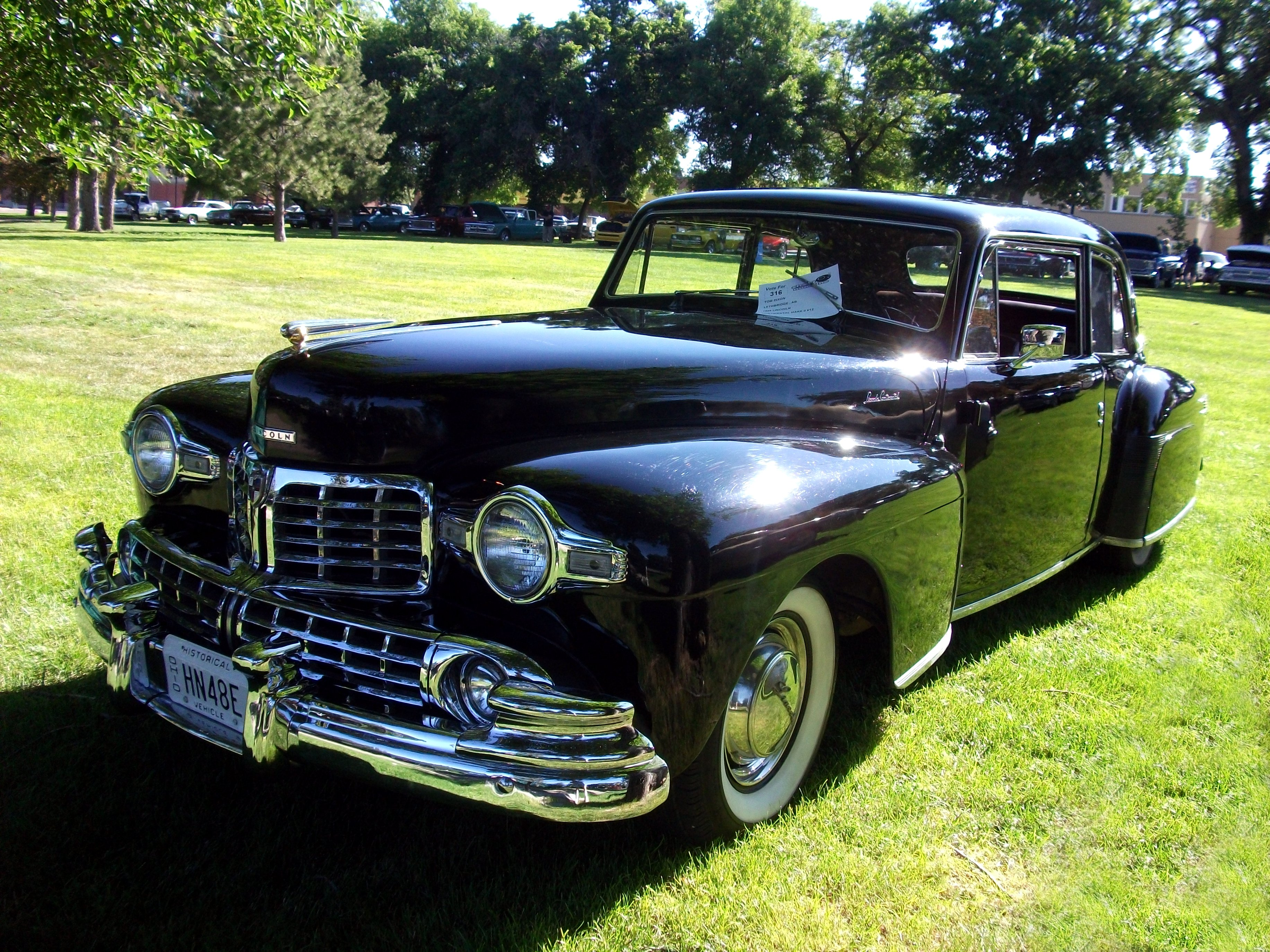
1948 Lincoln Continental coupe

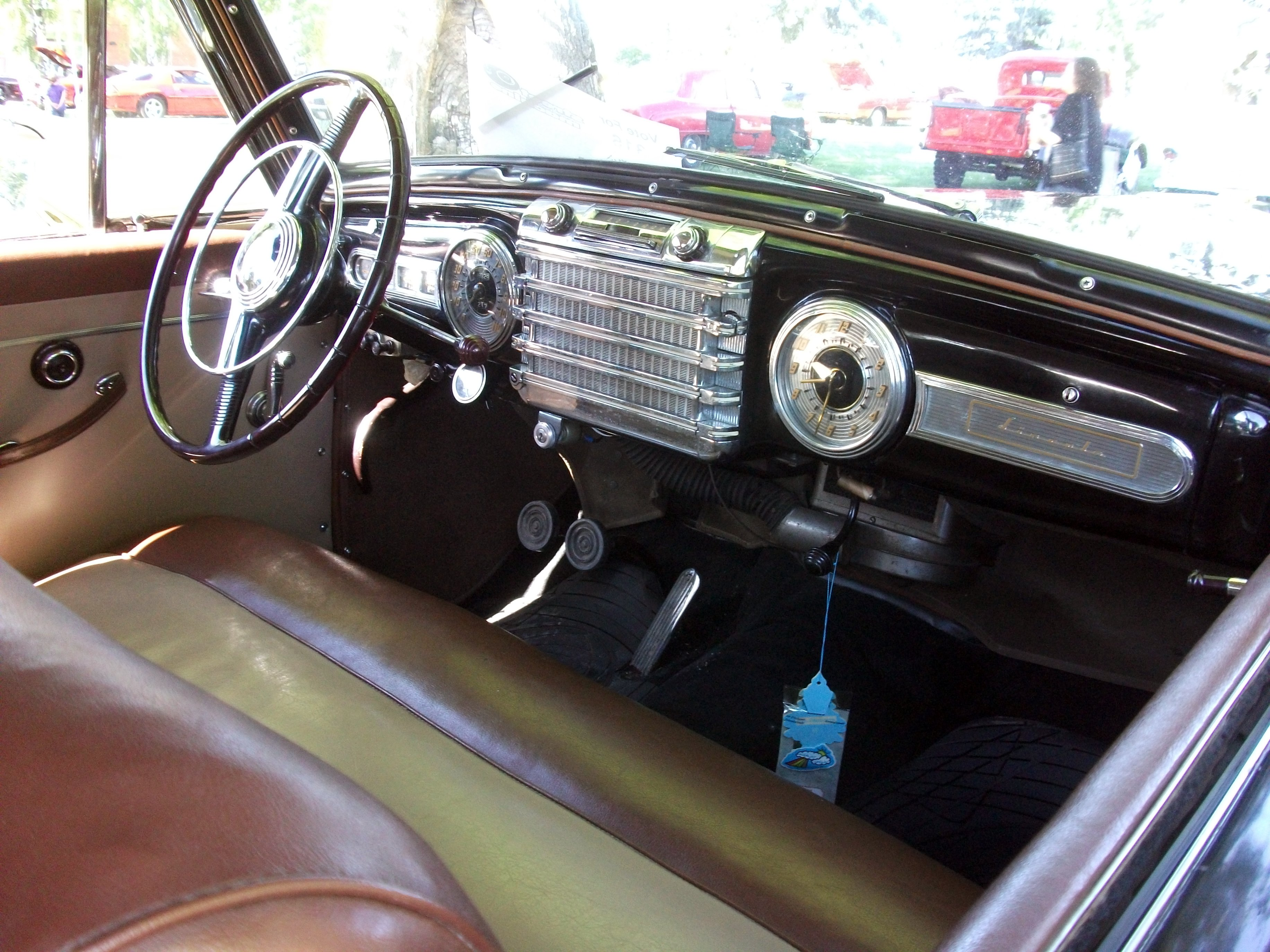
1948 Lincoln Continental coupe interior

== Second generation (1956–1957) ==
Second generation
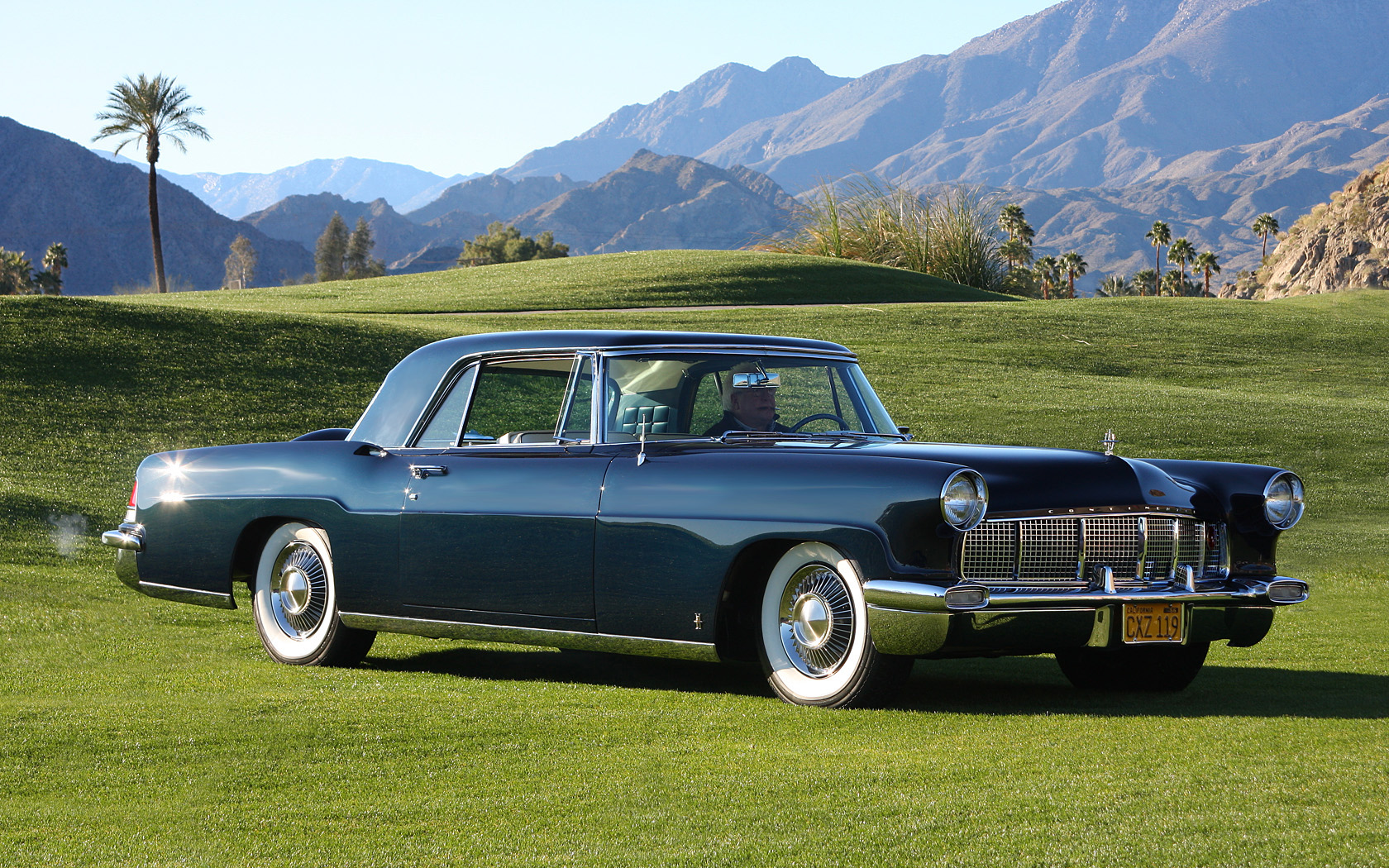
- Continental Mark II

Overview
- Manufacturer: Ford (Continental division)
- Model years: 1956–1957
- Assembly: United States: Allen Park, Michigan (Allen Park Assembly)
- Designer: Bill Schmidt

Body and chassis
- Body style: 2-door hardtop
- Layout: FR layout

Powertrain
- Engine: 368 cu in (6.0 L) Y-block V8

Dimensions
- Wheelbase: 126.0 in (3,200 mm)
- Length: 218.4 in (5,547 mm)
- Width: 77.5 in (1,968 mm)
- Height: 56.3 in (1,430 mm)
- Curb weight: 5,000 lb (2,300 kg)

For the 1956 model year, the Continental nameplate returned as a flagship vehicle, with Ford creating a namesake brand centered around the new vehicle. To highlight the European influence behind both generations, the new Continental was assigned the Mark II suffix (also in an effort to distinguish itself from the similar Bentley Continental). Marketed and serviced through the Lincoln-Mercury dealership network, the $10,000 ($118,421 in 2025 dollars) Continental Mark II was the most expensive automobile sold by a domestic manufacturer in the United States, rivaling the Rolls-Royce Silver Cloud. The Mark II included a large number of power-equipment features standard and offered only a single option: air conditioning, for $595.

While using a model-specific chassis (sharing its 126-inch wheelbase with the Lincoln Capri and Premiere, along with its suspension), the Mark II shared its Lincoln Y-block V8 with the Lincoln-Mercury line. Sharing no body commonality with other Ford Motor Company vehicles, each Mark II was hand-built, with all body panels hand-sanded and hand-finished.

Several design elements of the Mark II broke from American styling precedent of the time. With a nearly flat hood and decklid, the Mark II was also designed with neither tailfins (then prominent on American sedans) nor pontoon fenders (then current in Europe). While an American luxury automobile, the Mark II essentially limited chrome fitment to the window trim, grille, and bumpers (styled closer in line to a Mercedes-Benz 300 or a Rolls-Royce).

The "Continental spare tire" returned as a styling feature, but was now integrated into the decklid (partly as a styling feature, also serving to accommodate the vertically-mounted spare tire). Mounted on the decklid was a four-pointed star emblem. In various forms, Lincoln has retained that design for its brand emblem ever since.

In total, 2,996 Continental Mark IIs were produced including two prototype convertibles. As a consequence of the nearly hand-built construction, Ford estimated it lost nearly $1000 on every Continental Mark II produced; after 1957, the Mark II was discontinued. For the third generation, Ford repackaged the Continental as a flagship against its American-market competitors.

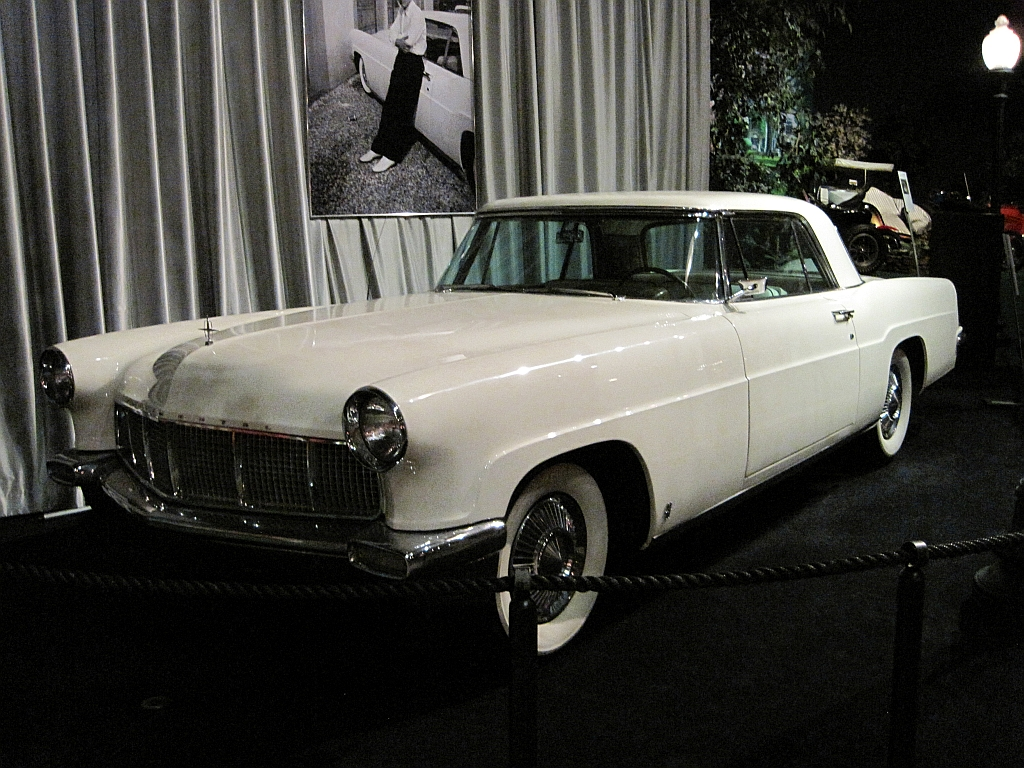
1956 Continental Mark II, originally owned by Elvis Presley

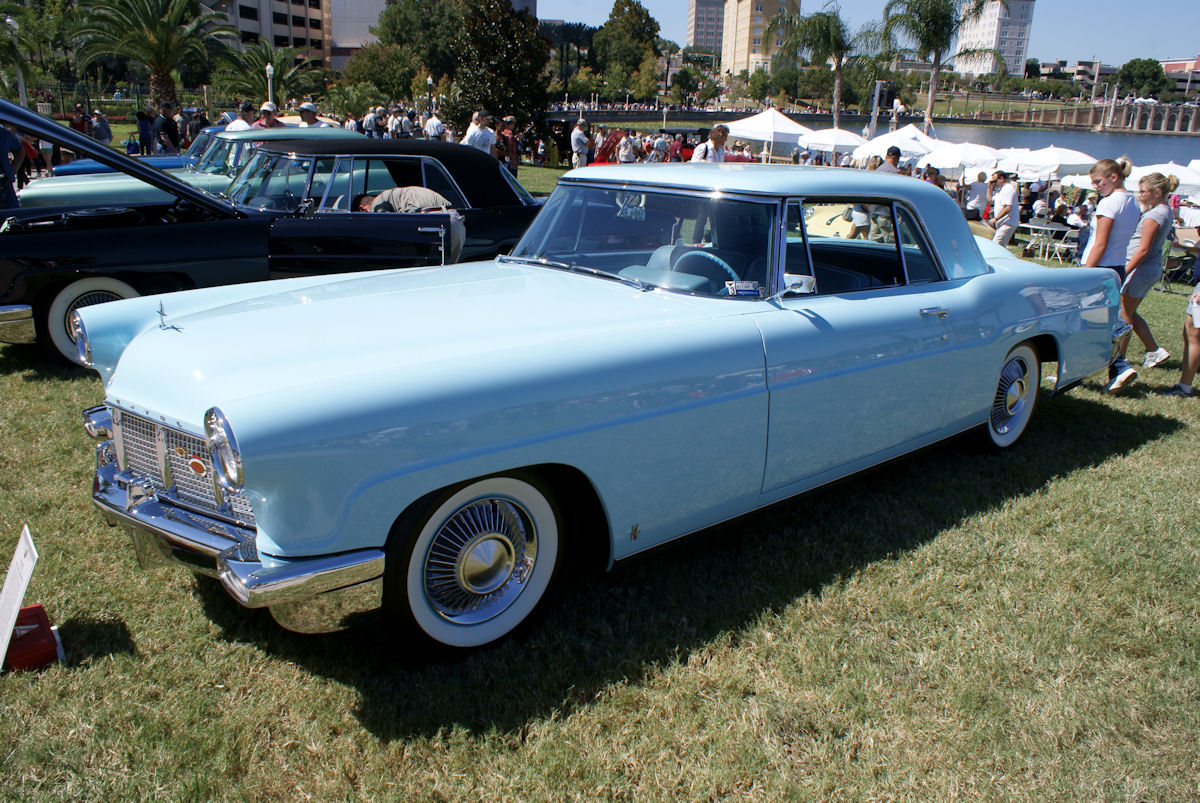
1957 Continental Mark II

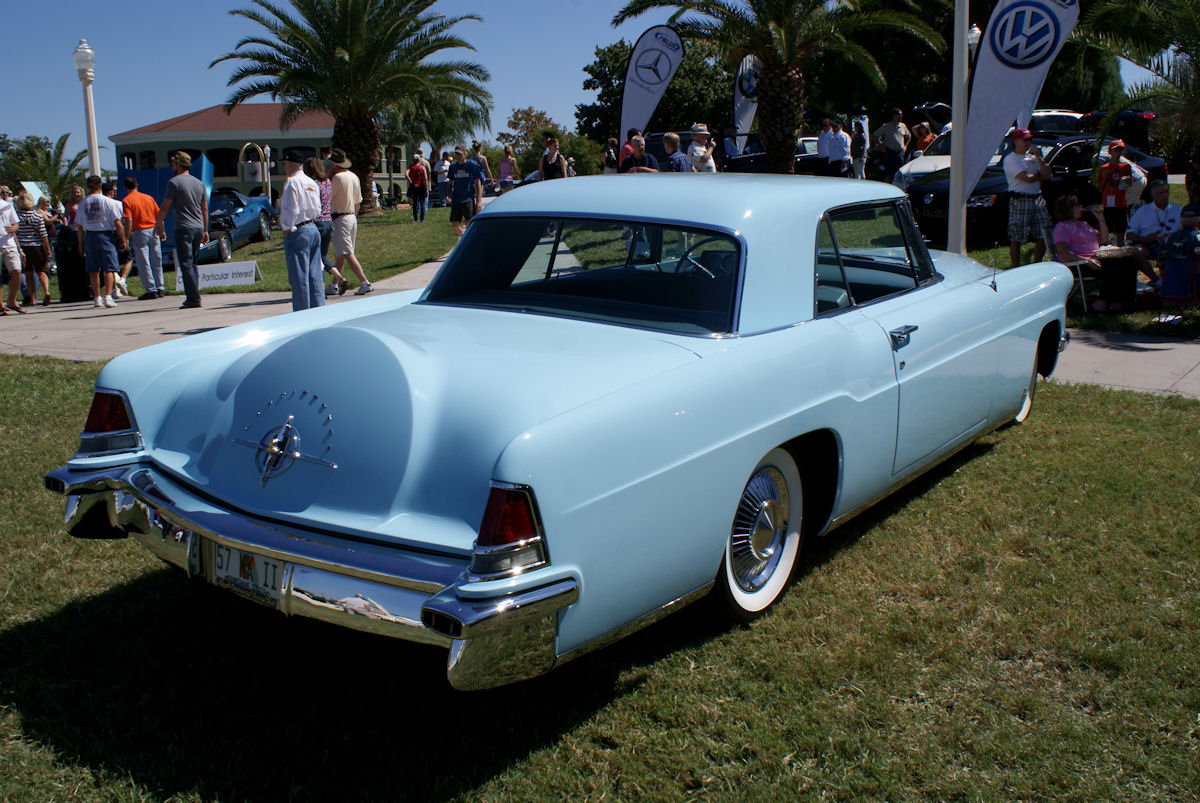
1957 Continental Mark II, showing rear Continental spare tire trunklid

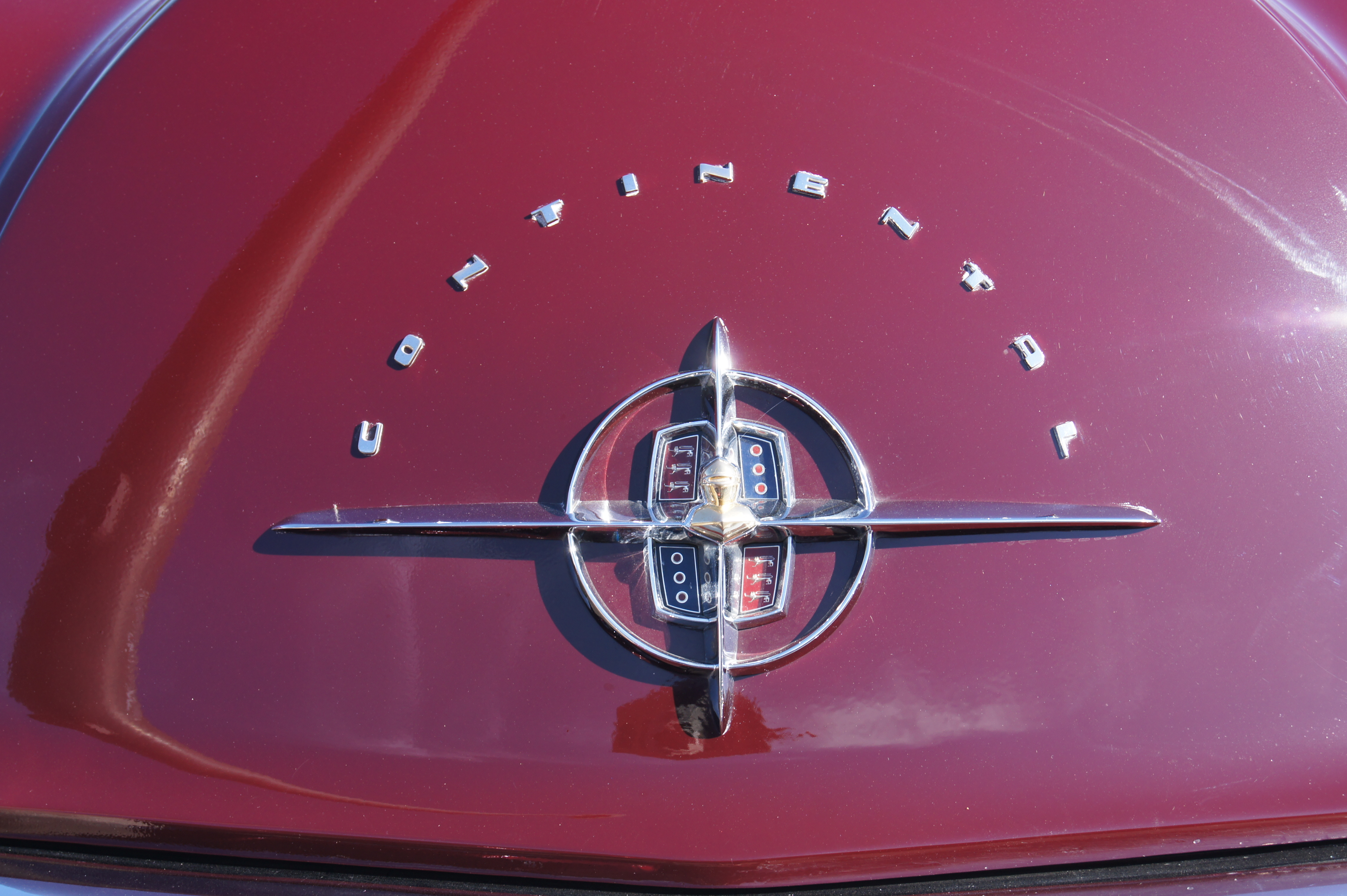
Continental Division emblem on rear trunklid, 1957 Mark II

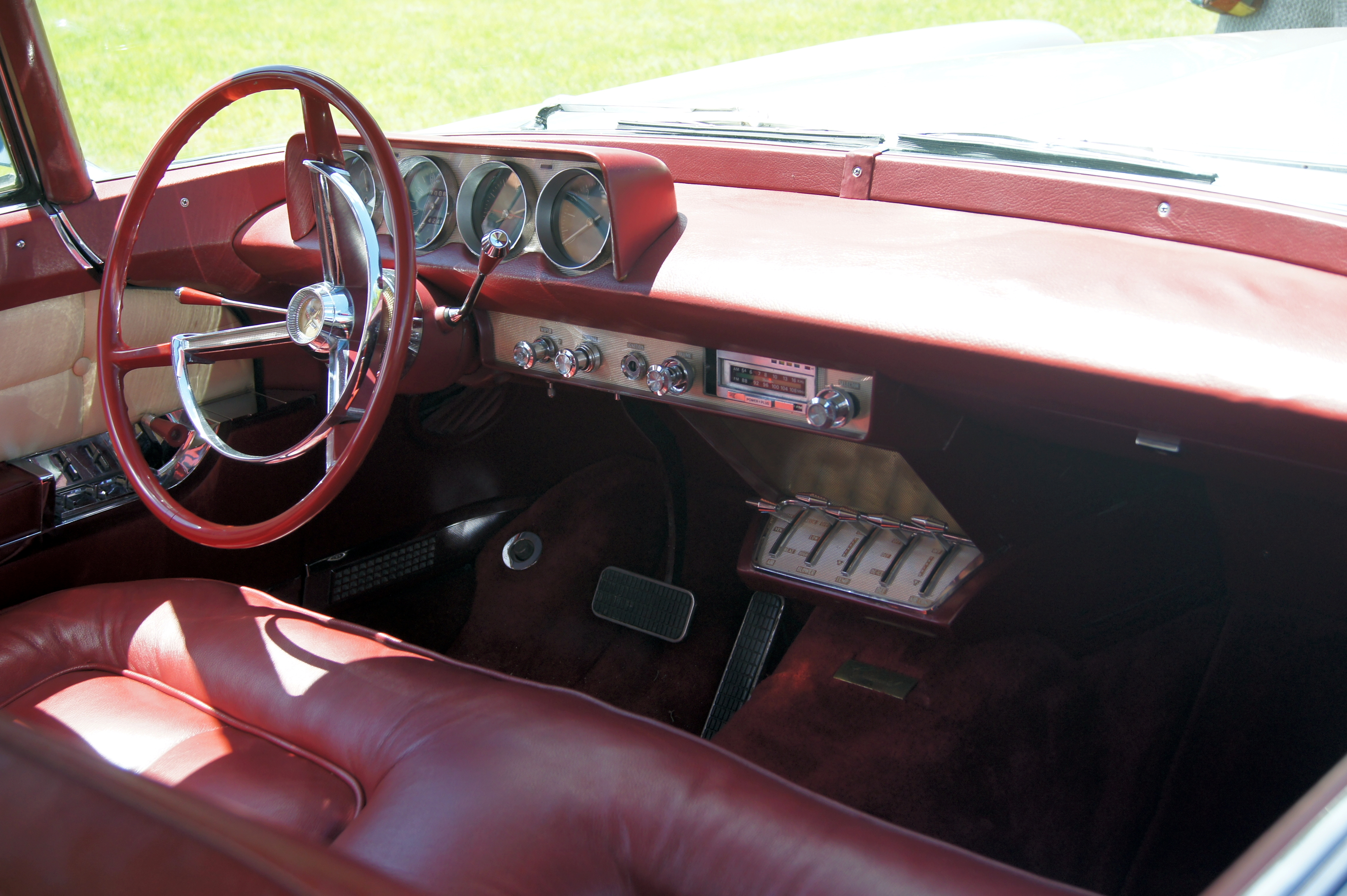
Interior, 1956 Mark II

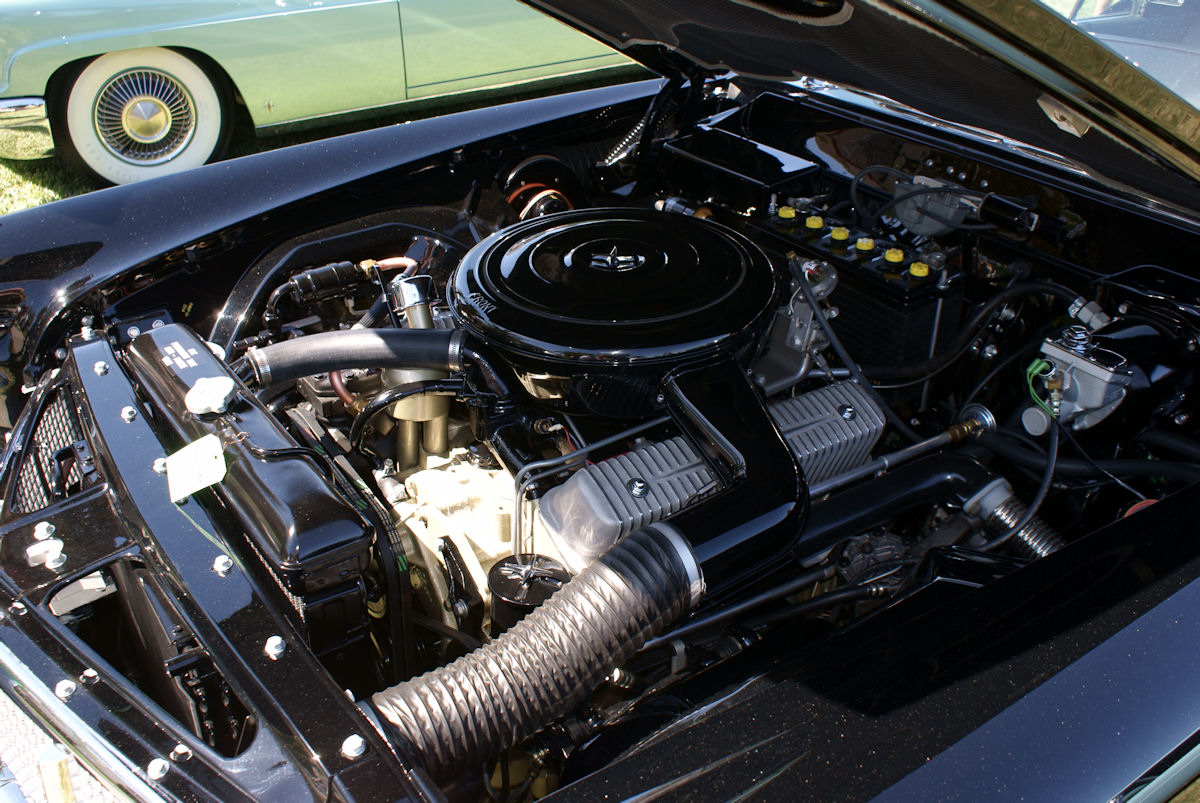
Lincoln 368 cubic-inch Y-block V8, 1956 Mark II

== Third generation (1958–1960) ==
Third generation
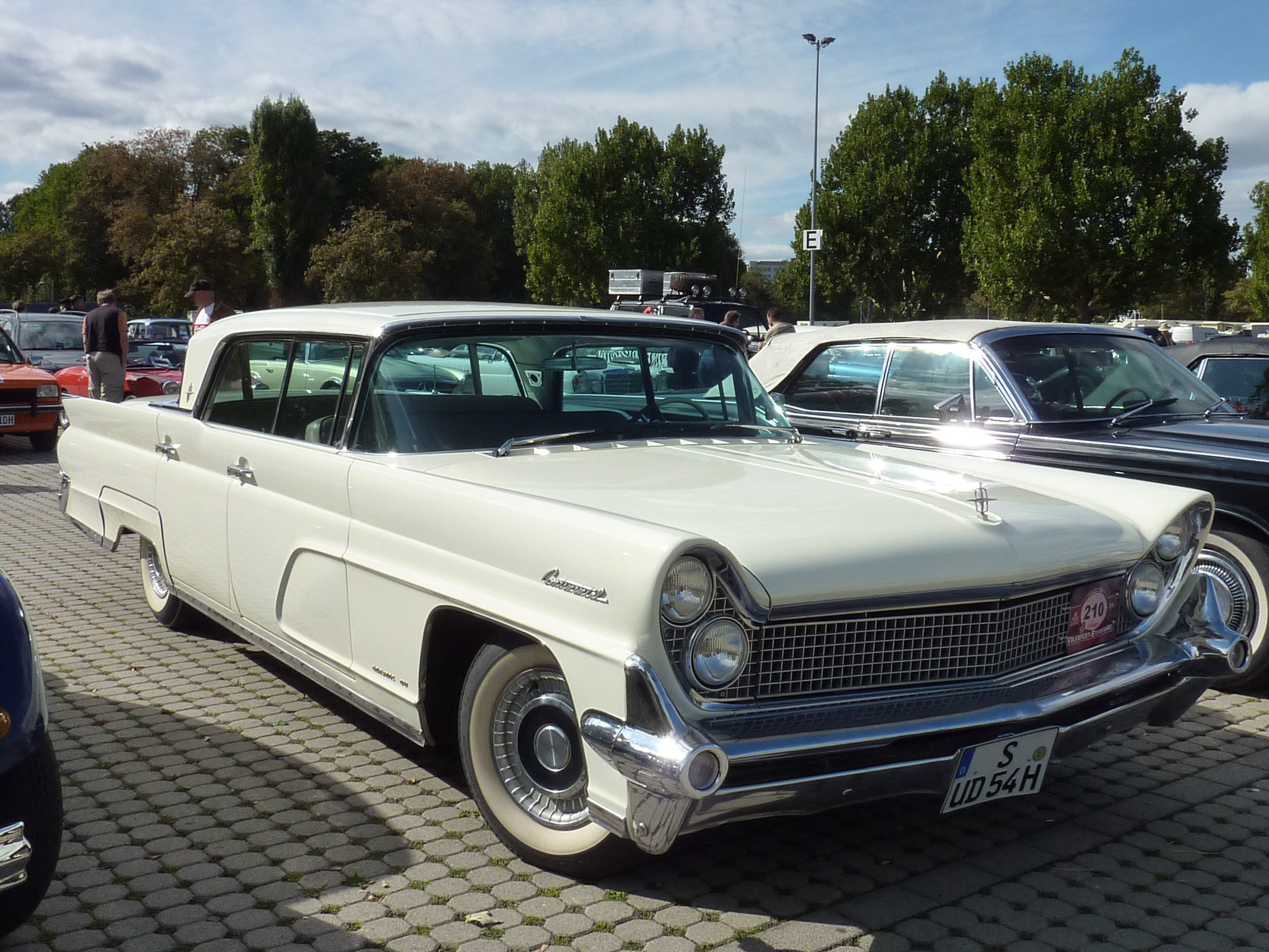
- 1959 Continental Mark IV Landau

Overview
- Manufacturer: Ford (Continental division, 1958); (Lincoln-Mercury-Edsel Division, 1959–60)
- Model years: 1958–1960
- Assembly: United States: Wixom, Michigan (Wixom Assembly)
- Designer: John Najjar

Body and chassis
- Body style: 2-door hardtop 2-door convertible 4-door sedan 4-door Landau hardtop 4-door Town Car sedan 4-door Limousine
- Layout: FR layout
- Chassis: Unibody
- Related: Lincoln Premiere; Lincoln Capri

Powertrain
- Engine: 430 cu in (7.0 L) MEL V8
- Transmission: 3-speed Turbo-Drive automatic

Dimensions
- Wheelbase: 131.0 in (3,327 mm)
- Length: 1958: 229.0 in (5,817 mm); 1959: 227.1 in (5,768 mm); 1960: 227.2 in (5,771 mm)
- Width: 1958–59: 80.1 in (2,035 mm); 1960: 80.3 in (2,040 mm)
- Height: 1958: 56.5 in (1,435 mm); 1959–1960: 56.7 in (1,440 mm)
- Curb weight: 5,000–5,700 lb (2,300–2,600 kg)

For 1958, Continental made its return as a flagship model line for Ford Motor Company. To build a better business case for the brand, Ford changed the market segment for Continental, positioning it as a competitor for the Cadillac Eldorado and Imperial LeBaron. To reach a $6,000 price point ($66,955 in 2025 dollars), Continental was forced to abandon the hand-built assembly of the Mark II, with the model line sharing production with Lincoln at the then-new Wixom Assembly Plant.

The 1958 Continental Mark III was designed by John Najjar, Chief Stylist of Lincoln, assisted by Elwood Engel largely drawing influence from the 1955 Ford La Tosca concept model designed by Alex Tremulis. Engel would style the 1959 Mark IV, with Don Delarossa (who replaced Najjar as Lincoln Chief Stylist in 1957) developing the 1960 Mark V. As a result of its massive size and the configuration of its headlights, the model line was nicknamed the "slant-eyed monster" in the Ford design studio.

For 1959, Ford cancelled the Continental division outright, with its model line remaining through the 1960 model year as part of the model cycle.

=== Chassis ===
Sharing a common chassis with the Lincoln Capri and Premiere, the 1958–1960 Continental Mark III–V use a unibody chassis (the first since the Lincoln-Zephyr). Using a 131-inch wheelbase, this generation is the longest-wheelbase sedan ever built by Ford Motor Company. The front axle is fitted with double-wishbone independent front suspension with a coil-sprung live rear axle. For 1960, the rear suspension was redesigned, changing to a leaf-sprung solid rear axle.

Shared with Lincoln, Mercury, and the Ford Thunderbird, the Continental Mark III–V were fitted with a 430 cubic-inch MEL V8 engine; a 3-speed Turbo-Drive automatic was the sole transmission. In 1958, the engine produced 375 hp, and was detuned to 350 hp in 1959, making 315 hp in 1960.

Engine name	Displacement	Output	Transmission
Ford MEL V8	430 cu in (7.0 L)	1958: 375 hp (280 kW) 1959: 350 hp (260 kW) 1960: 315 hp (235 kW)	3-speed Turbo-Drive automatic

=== Body ===
To set itself apart from the Lincoln, the Continental was styled with a division-specific grille; all versions (including convertibles) were styled with a reverse-slant roofline. Adopted from the Mercury Turnpike Cruiser, a retractable "breezeway" rear window allowed for augmented interior ventilation (along with air conditioning).

The shared Lincoln body brought the retirement of several Continental design elements, including the rear spare tire decklid and "long hood, short deck" proportions. In comparison to many of its competitors, the use of chrome on a third-generation Continental was (relatively) restrained and tailfins were nearly vestigial.

Longer than a Ford Excursion, the 1958–1960 Continentals are the longest sedans ever produced by Ford without 5 mph bumpers. The 1958 Continental Mark III convertible is the longest convertible ever mass-produced in the United States, with the sole exception of the rare 1934–1937 Cadillac V16 convertibles.

=== Model history ===
For the third generation, Continental maintained its previous naming tradition, introducing its model line as the Mark III. However, the two subsequent model years would see incremental changes in model names. As with Lincoln, Continental offered its model line as a four-door pillared sedan, a four-door Landau hardtop, and a two-door hardtop; two-door convertibles were exclusive to Continental.

==== 1958 ====
Though approximately 40% less expensive than its Mark II predecessor, the Mark III remained well-equipped. In addition to "Continental III" front fender badging, the Mark III was distinguished by the lack of chrome bodyside trim and the four-point star emblem.

Retaining the power-operated locks and windows (including vent windows) of the Mark II, the controls were fitted with a safety lockout (which restricted activation to the driver's door). Air conditioning made its return (relocating vents from the ceiling to the dashboard) with a thermostat-style control. A new option was an FM radio tuner. The "Auto Lube" system was an option that allowed the driver pushbutton capability to lubricate the front suspension and steering system (as long as an oil reservoir was kept full).

==== 1959 ====
The Continental Mark IV saw a minor restyling, largely intended to tone down its appearance. The front bumpers saw their Dagmars removed and the side sculpting of the front fenders were substantially smoothed out. The round taillamps were reshaped and the headlamp clusters were restyled as part of the grille. The badging was revised, with "Mark IV" added to the lower front fenders in block lettering.

As a flagship model for Continental, the limited-production Town Car and Limousine (see below) were introduced.

==== 1960 ====
The Continental Mark V saw further revisions to the exterior, with more substantial bumpers replacing the previous aviation-influenced designs (Dagmars returned). The grille was restyled with a new eggcrate design; to accommodate the new bumper, it also extended slightly lower. Despite the closure of the division, the "Continental" badge remained on the front fenders, with "Mark V" moved to the rear quarter panels; to distinguish the Mark V from Lincolns, the side sculpting was trimmed with four horizontal chrome spears.

The interior saw multiple updates, as the instrument panel moved from a large half-circle speedometer to a configuration with four circular gauges. For the first time, the parking brake was released by a pushbutton release on the instrument panel; the rear seat was given heated and cooled air by air vents placed in the front door armrests.

==== Town Car/Limousine ====
For 1959, Lincoln added the Town Car and Limousine variants of the four-door pillared sedan, intended as a competitor for the Cadillac Series 75 and Imperial Crown Limousine. Assembled through a product between Lincoln and coachbuilders Hess and Eisenhardt; all examples were produced in black. Sized between the European competitors of the Mark II and the larger Cadillac and Imperial limousines, the Town Car/Limousine retained the 131-inch wheelbase used by the rest of the Lincoln/Continental line. The two variants differed from the four-door pillared sedan, with a coachbuilt roof replacing the standard reverse-slant design (adopting its profile from a proposed Mark II successor), along with a full-length padded vinyl roof and fixed rear window (offering more privacy over the breezeway design).

Intended for use as an owner-driven vehicle, the Town Car was fitted with matching front and rear broadcloth seats. Externally identical to the Town Car, the Limousine (intended for chauffer-driven use) included a retractable glass partition between the seats (with a black leather front seat). Including every available option as standard equipment, the Town Car and Limousine were both fitted with dual air conditioning (augmented by a trunk-mounted evaporator); the Limousine was also fitted with a rear-seat radio.

Priced at $9,208 ($101,698 in current money) for the Town Car and $10,230 ($112,985 in current money) for the Limousine, the coachbuilt vehicles were sold nearly exclusively through special order. Among the rarest Lincoln vehicles ever sold, 214 examples of the Town Car were built (134 for 1960); 83 Limousines were built (34 for 1960).

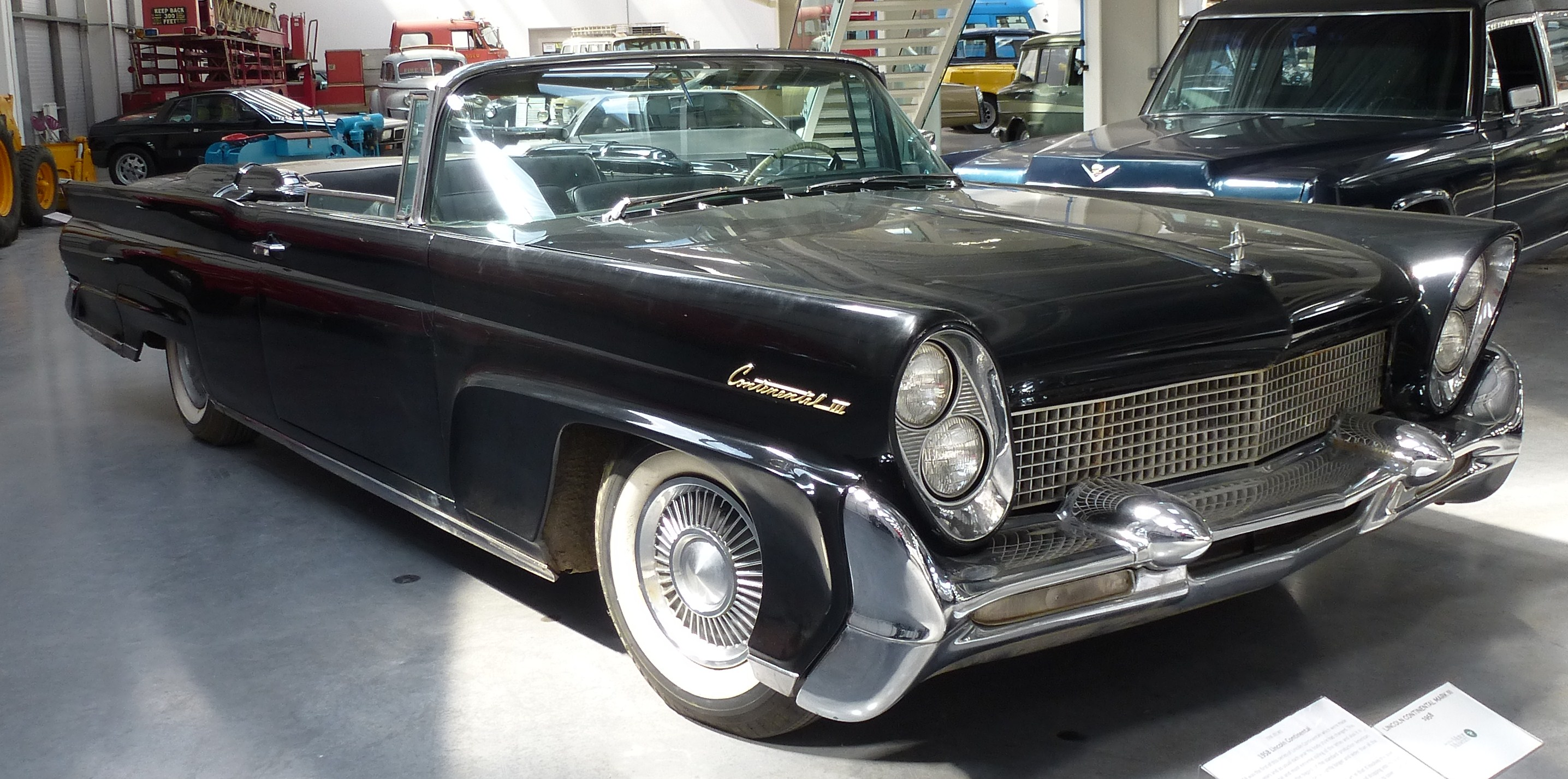
1958 Continental Mark III convertible

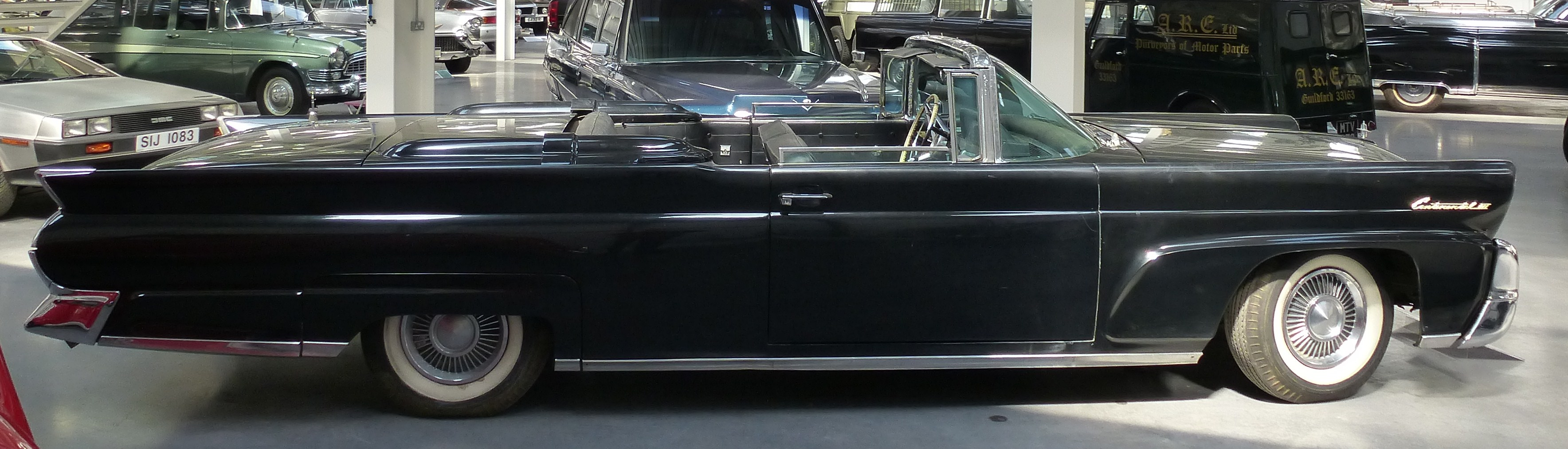
1958 Continental Mark III, side view

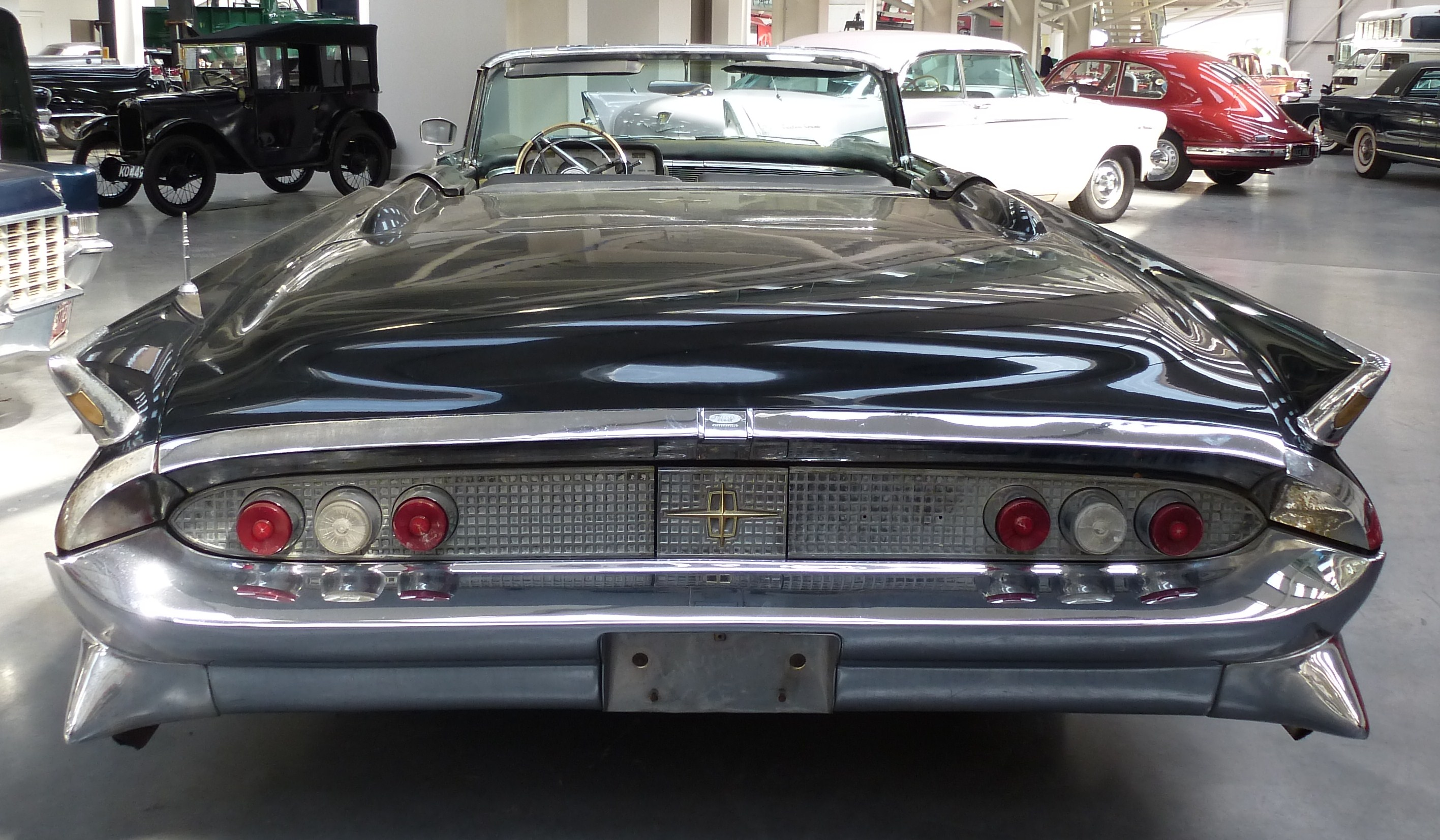
1958 Continental Mark III, rear view

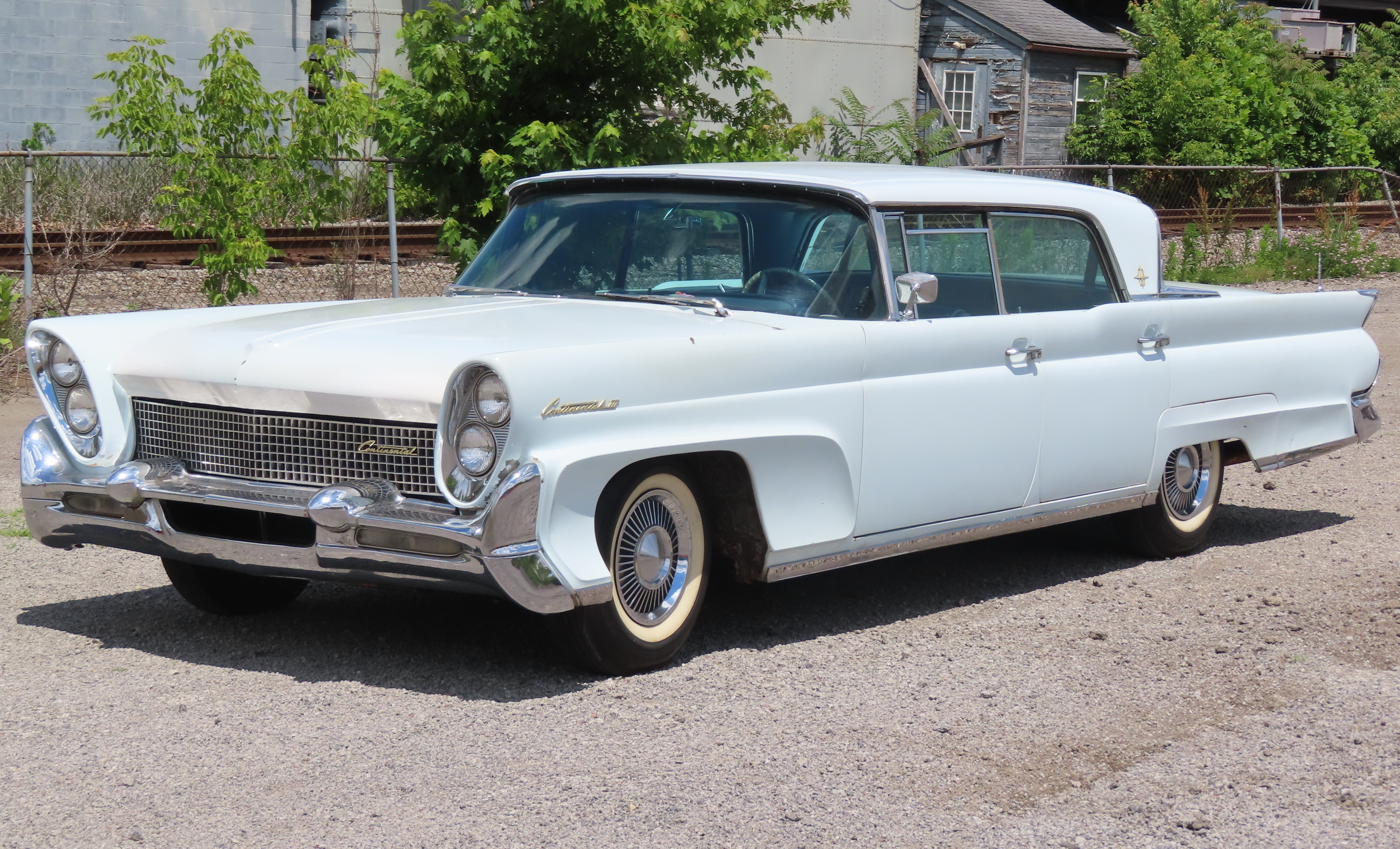
1958 Continental Mark III 4-door sedan

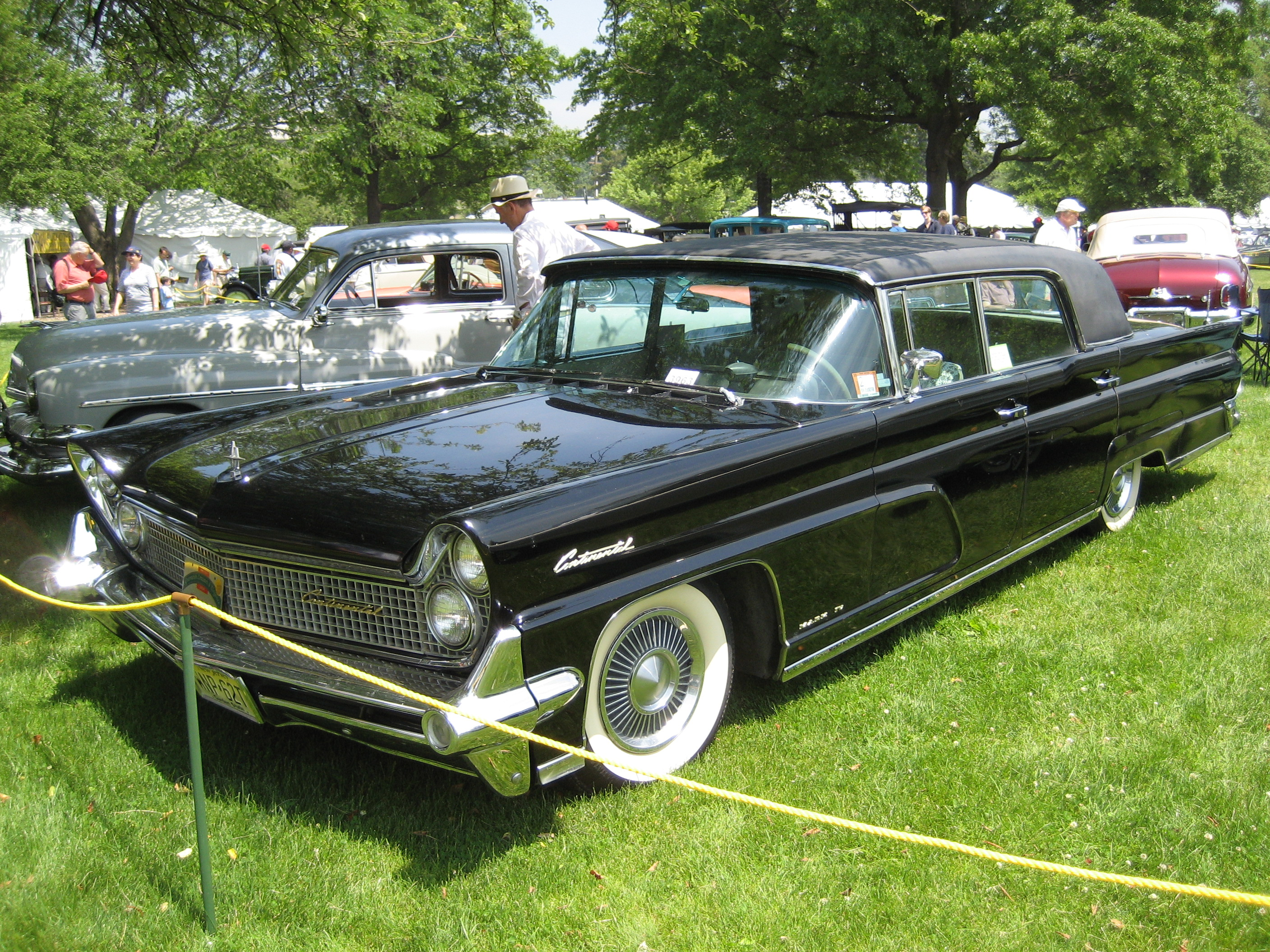
1959 Continental Mark IV Town Car

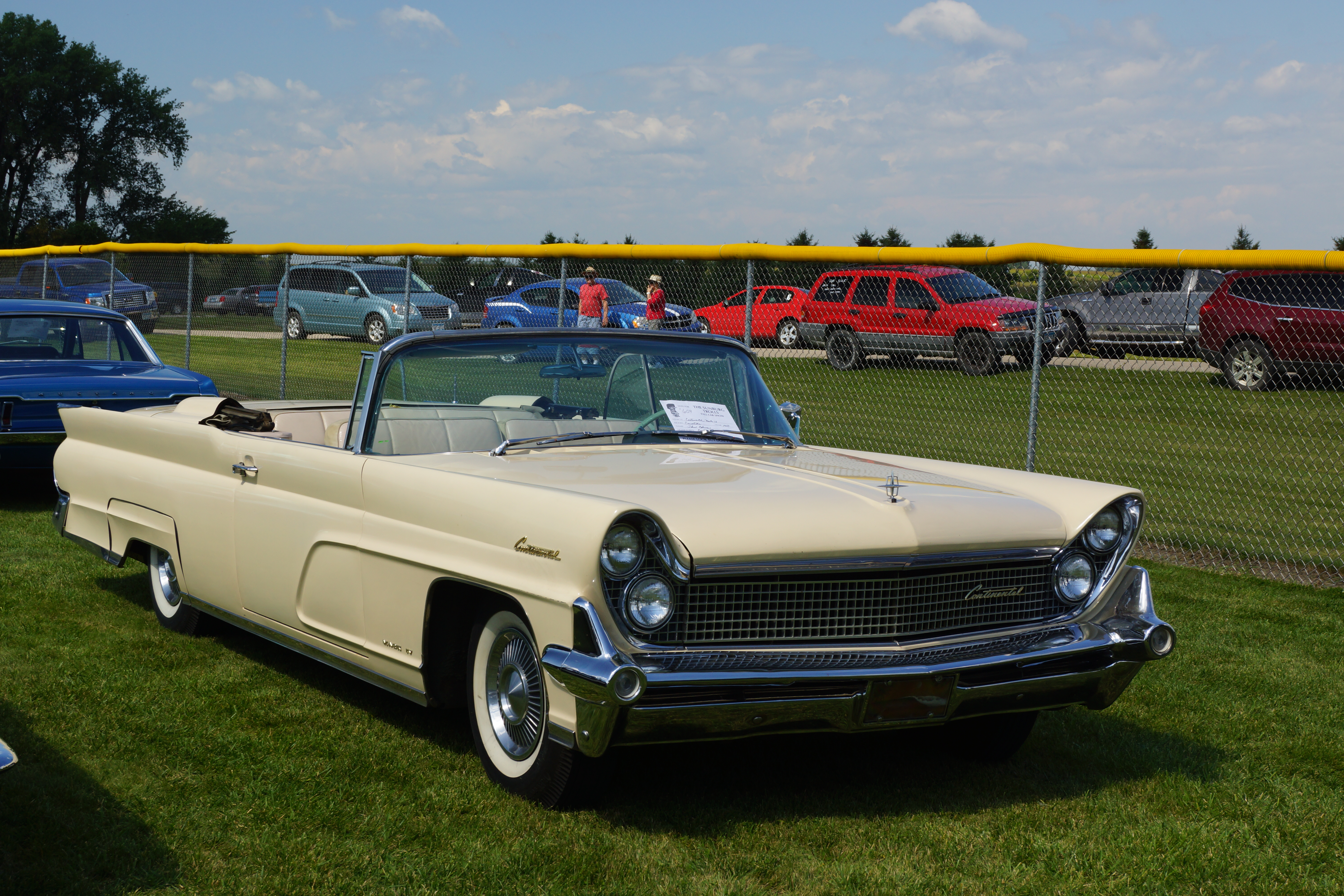
1959 Continental Mark IV convertible

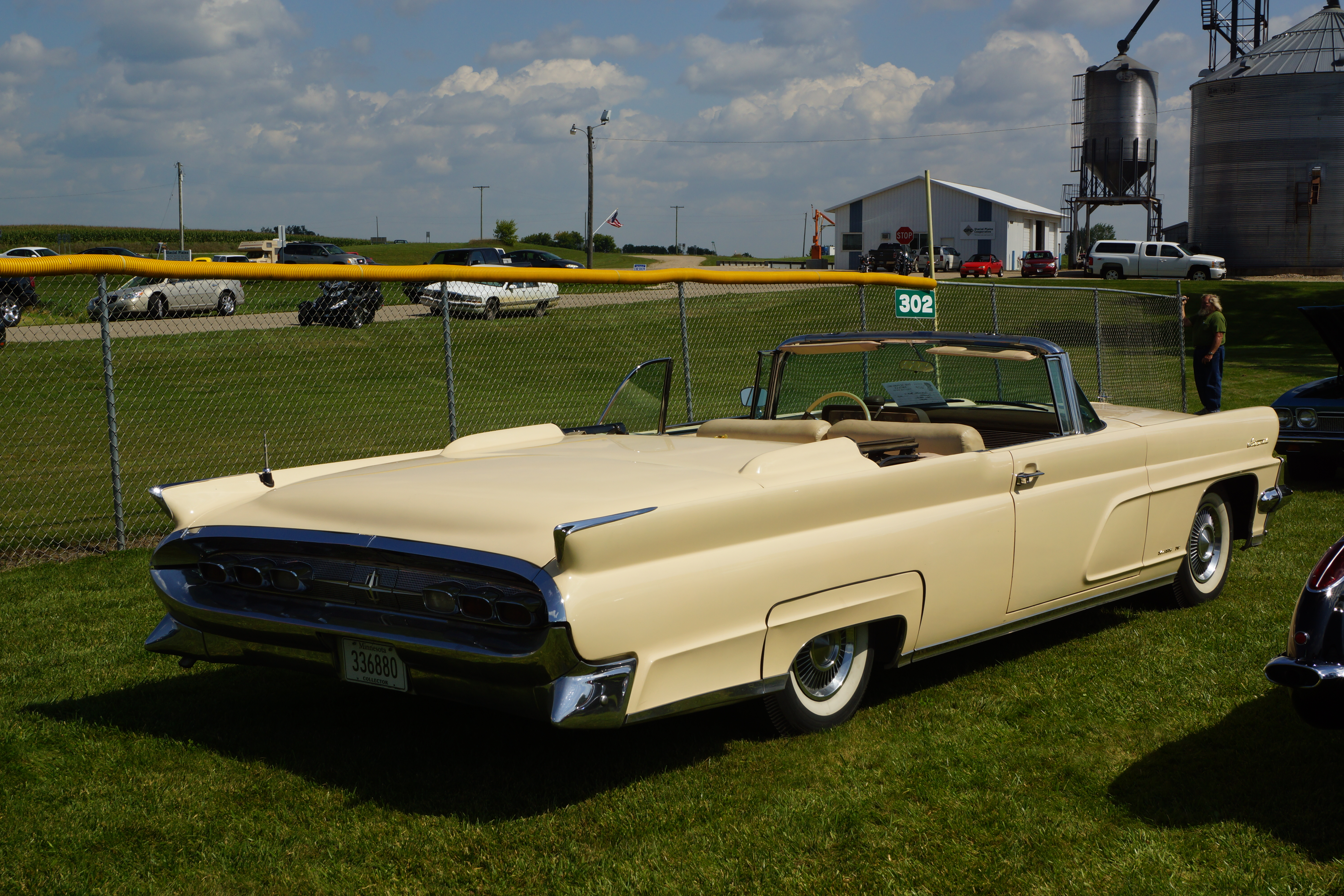
1959 Continental Mark IV convertible, rear view

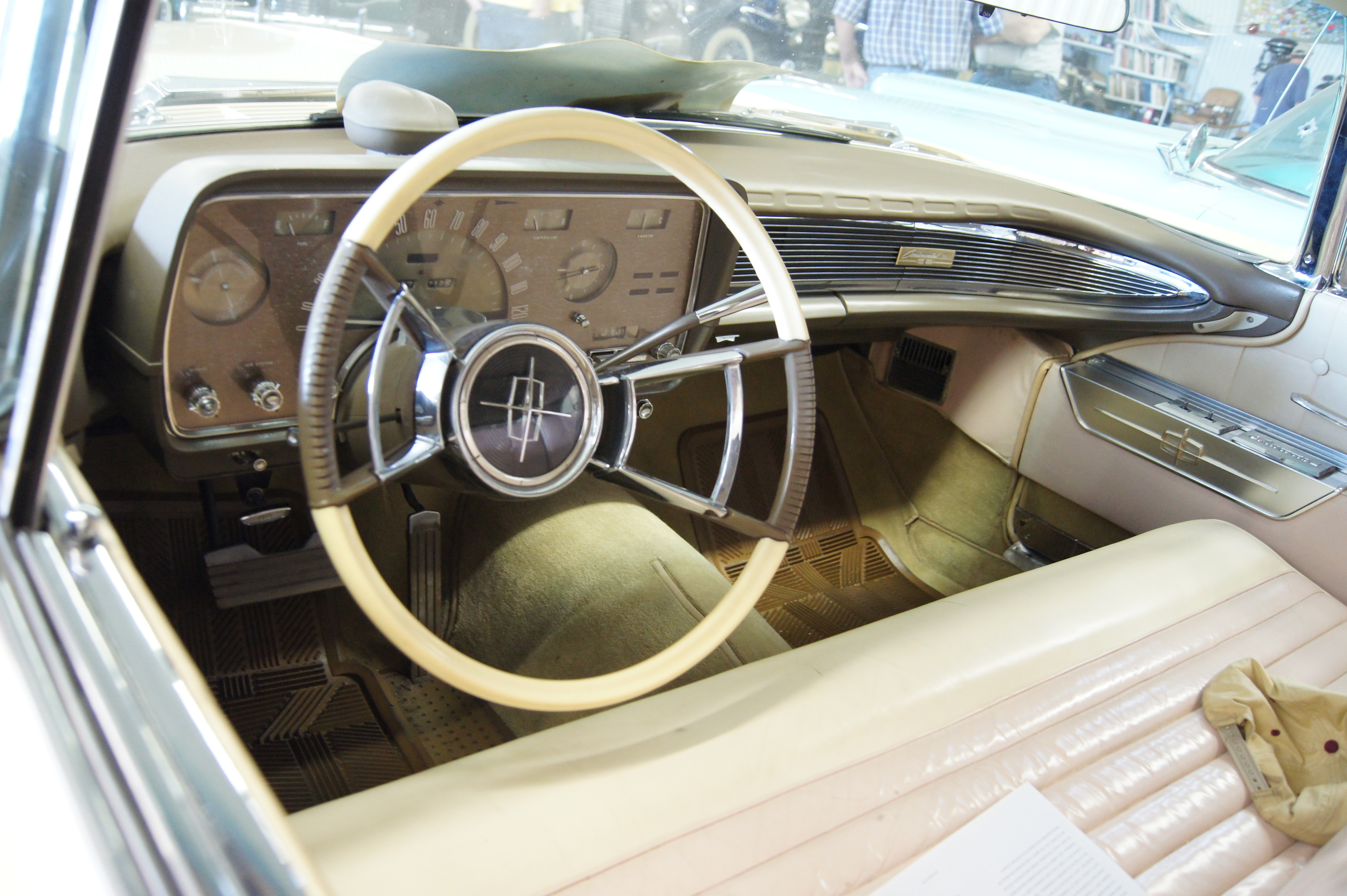
1959 Continental Mark IV interior

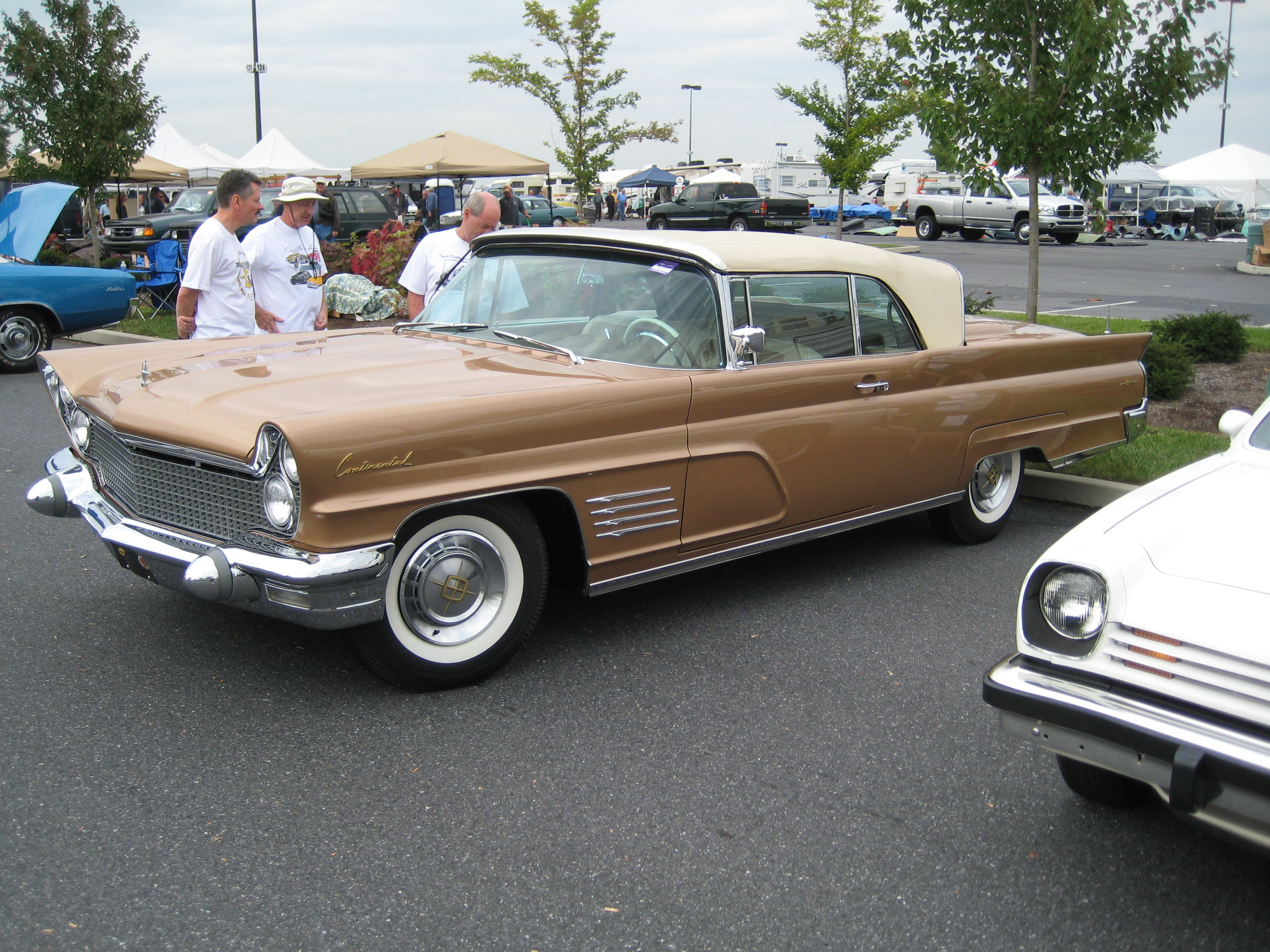
1960 Continental Mark V convertible, with top raised

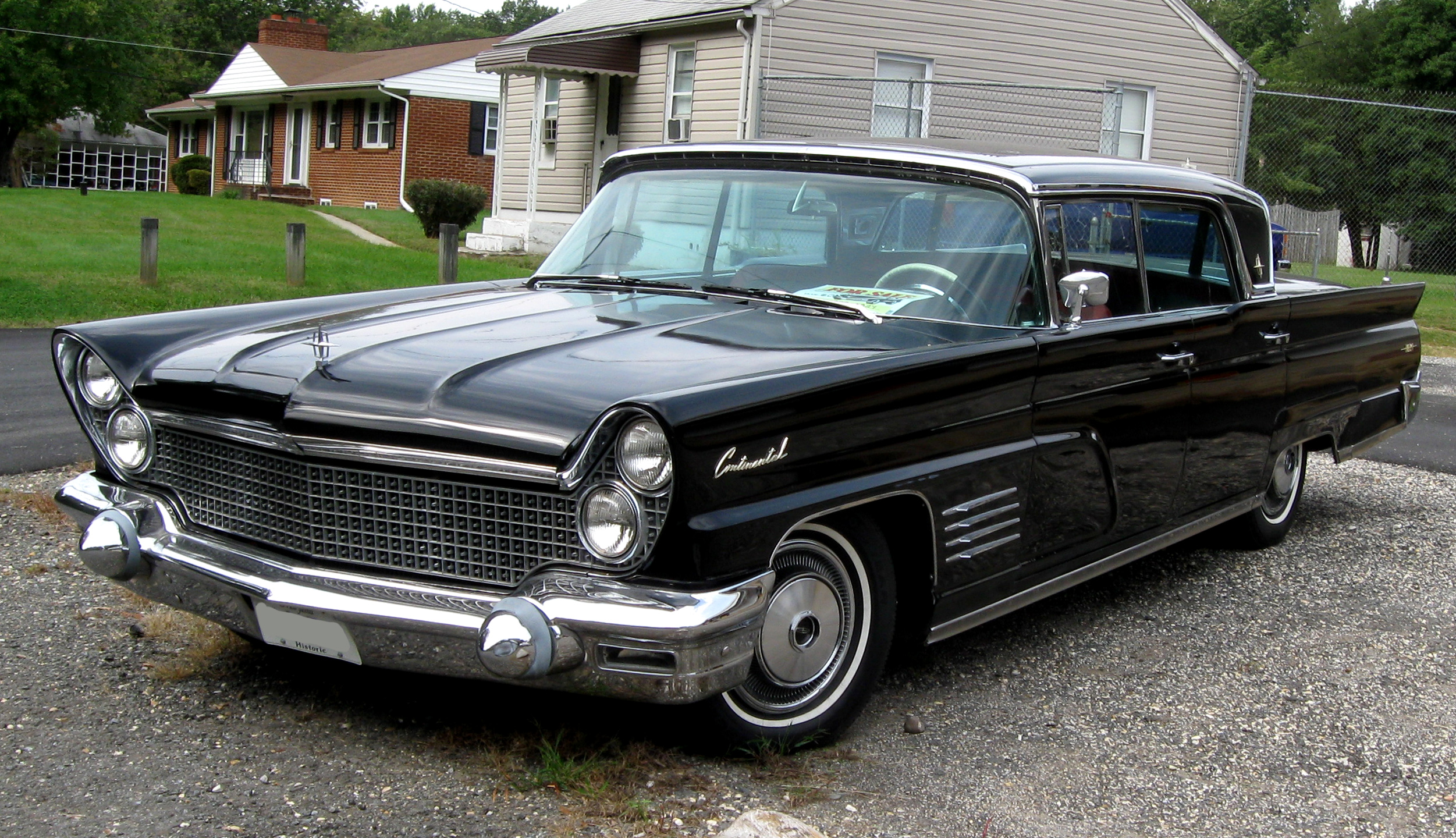
1960 Continental Mark V Landau (four-door hardtop sedan)

=== Production legacy ===
Following its 40% reduction in price from the Mark II to the Mark III, Continental would see its sales more than quadruple for 1958. The Mark IV and Mark V collectively fared well, with sales only declining slightly over three year. The Landau and the Convertible were the most popular models (the latter, as Lincoln did not then sell a convertible under its own brand).

From 1958 to 1960, the Lincoln Division lost over $60 million ($650 million in 2025 dollars) over the production of the Lincoln Premiere/Capri and the Continental Mark III, IV, and V. Coinciding with the challenge of launching newly developed luxury vehicles in a recession economy, Lincoln had relocated its entire production to an all-new production facility. The largest expense for the division was associated with the development of its unitized chassis, which was shared with neither Ford nor Mercury or Edsel (the latter two, which shared the same showroom with Lincoln).

For 1961, the Continental (the most popular vehicle sold by Lincoln) underwent an additional rebranding. After serving most of the 1950s as a flagship marque, Lincoln adopted the nameplate, marketing it as its only model line for the next 16 years. During the mid-1960s, Ford decided to develop a direct successor to the Mark II, naming it the Continental Mark III (as an early 1969 model). The revival of the Mark series, the 1969 Mark III continued to be sold, marketed, and serviced through the Lincoln-Mercury dealer network, though it was not officially badged as a Lincoln.

In contrast with its controversial exterior design, the 1958–1960 Continental Mark III–Mark V was largely downplayed in comparison to their 1969–1979 namesakes, leading to a "forgotten Marks" moniker.

1958–1960 Continental production
	2-door		4-door		Formal sedan		Yearly total
	Hardtop	Convertible	Sedan	Landau hardtop	Town Car	Limousine	Yearly total
1958 Mark III	2,328	3,048	1,283	5,891	N/A		12,550
1959 Mark IV	1,703	2,195	955	6,146	78	49	11,126
1960 Mark V	1,461	2,044	807	6,604	136	34	11,086
	5,492	7,287	3,045	18,641	214	83	34,762

== Fourth generation (1961–1969) ==
Fourth generation
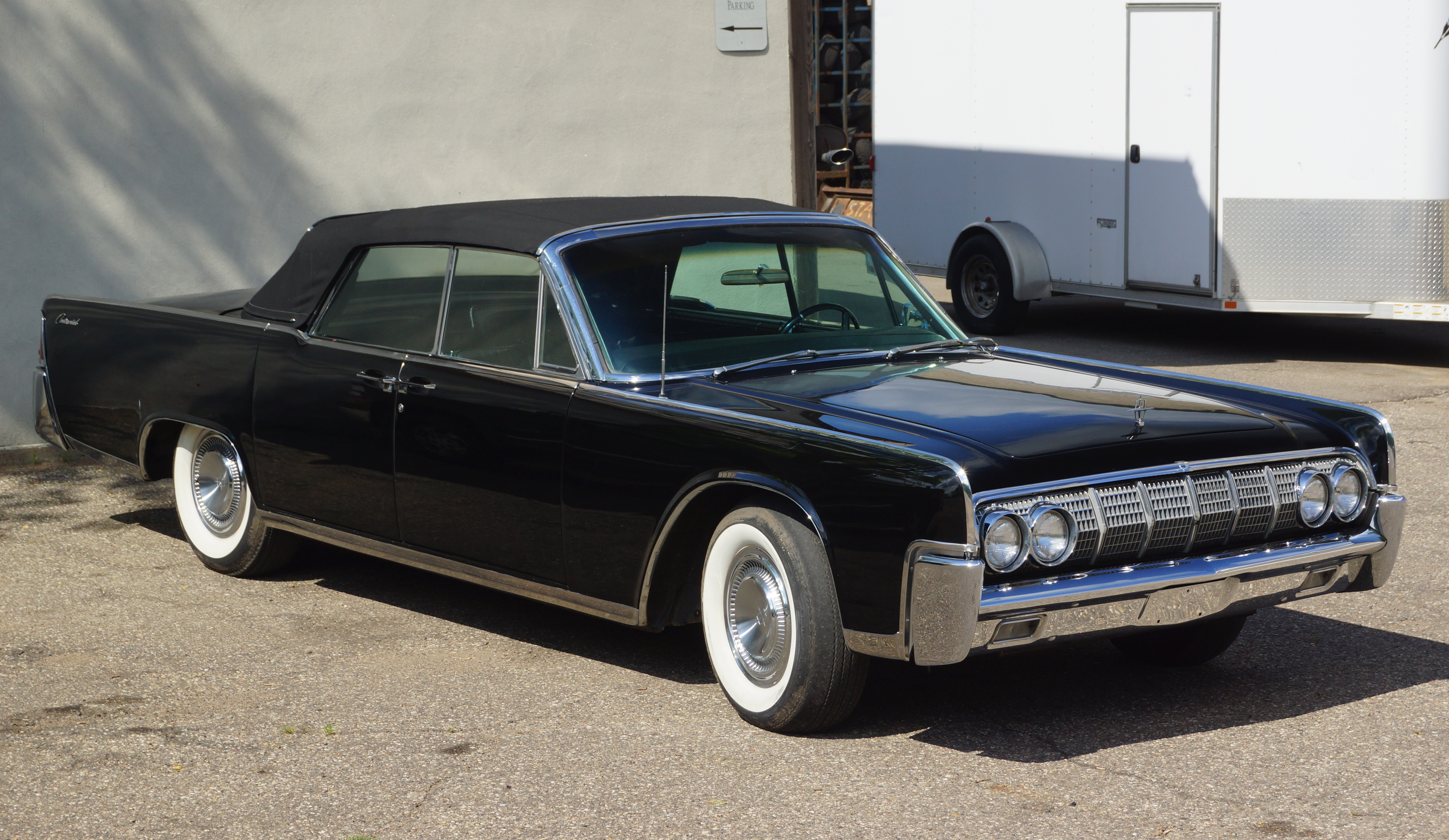
- 1964 Lincoln Continental 4-door convertible

Overview
- Manufacturer: Lincoln (Ford)
- Production: November 1960–1969
- Assembly: United States: Wixom, Michigan (Wixom Assembly)
- Designer: Elwood Engel

Body and chassis
- Body style: 2-door hardtop 4-door sedan 4-door convertible
- Layout: FR layout
- Doors: Conventional doors (front); Coach Doors (rear)
- Chassis: unibody
- Related: Ford Thunderbird (fifth generation) (1969–1971); Continental Mark III (1969–1971)

Powertrain
- Engine: 430 cu in (7.0 L) MEL V8; 460 cu in (7.5 L) 385-series V8; 462 cu in (7.6 L) MEL V8
- Transmission: 3-speed Turbo-Drive automatic 3-speed C6 automatic

Dimensions
- Wheelbase: 1961–1963: 123.0 in (3,124 mm); 1964–1969: 126.0 in (3,200 mm)
- Length: 1961: 212.4 in (5,395 mm); 1962–1963: 213.3 in (5,418 mm); 1964–1965: 216.3 in (5,494 mm); 1966–1968: 220.9 in (5,611 mm); 1969: 224.2 in (5,695 mm)
- Width: 1961–1965: 78.6 in (1,996 mm); 1966–1969: 79.7 in (2,024 mm)
- Height: 1961–1963: 53.6 in (1,361 mm); 1964–1965: 54.2 in (1,377 mm); 1966–1968: 55.0 in (1,397 mm); 1969: 54.2 in (1,377 mm)
- Curb weight: 5,000–5,700 lb (2,300–2,600 kg)

Chronology
- Predecessor: Lincoln Premiere

For the 1961 model year, the Lincoln range was consolidated into one model. Following the $60 million in losses ($650 million in 2025 dollars) to develop the 1958–1960 cars, all models were replaced by a new Lincoln Continental. Making its first appearance since 1948, the fourth-generation was available only as a four-door sedan and convertible until its 1966 model year refresh. The 1961 four-door sedan was listed at US$6,067 ($65,366 in 2025 dollars) and 22,303 were manufactured, while the convertible was listed at US$6,713 ($72,325 in 2025 dollars) and numbered 2,857.

The new generation was nearly 15 inches shorter overall with a 8" shorter wheelbase over its predecessor, though heavier than its Cadillac or Imperial counterparts. Its construction and post-build quality control reflected Ford corporate management's commitment to quality.

The 1961 Lincoln Continental won Car Life's 1961 Engineering Excellence Award.

=== Development ===
The fourth-generation Lincoln Continental was styled by Ford design vice president Elwood Engel. In mid-1958, Lincoln was struggling against Cadillac, with its lack of profitability putting the future of the division at risk. In 1958, Engel developed a proposal for the 1961 Ford Thunderbird with staffers Howard Payne and John Orfe. While the proposal was not selected for the Thunderbird, the design interested Ford executives to the point of desiring the vehicle as a four-door Lincoln.

At the time of the approval, Ford product planners had come to two conclusions critical to restoring the Lincoln Division to profitability. First, to instill design continuity, Lincoln would adopt a model cycle distinct from Ford or Mercury, moving from three years to eight or nine. Second, the 1958 Lincoln model line was too large for a standard-length sedan; consequently, the 1961 Lincoln would have to decrease its exterior footprint.

=== Chassis ===
The fourth-generation Lincoln Continental rode on a stretched version of the unibody platform produced for the 1961 Thunderbird, lengthened to a 123-inch wheelbase from market launch to 1963. This was then extended to 126 inches and retained until 1969.

The only engine available was the 430 cu in (7.0 L) MEL V8 carried over from the Mark V. It was expanded to 462 cubic inches on 1966 models, becoming the largest-displacement engine ever used in a Ford Motor Company passenger car. A new engine, the 460 cu in (7.5 L) 385-series-based V8, took its place by 1969, shared with the Continental Mark III. All versions of the Continental were fitted with a 3-speed automatic transmission. New for 1966 was Ford's C6 automatic, designed for use in big block, high-horsepower V8 engines.

=== Body ===
At its launch, the fourth-generation Lincoln Continental was offered solely as a four-door, as either a sedan or a convertible. For the first time on a Lincoln since 1951, rear doors were rear-hinged (suicide doors). To alert drivers of open doors, Lincoln fitted the dashboard with a "Door Ajar" warning light as seen on many modern automobiles. Latching at the B-pillar with a vacuum-operated central locking system, convertibles used an abbreviated pillar while sedans were "pillared hardtops.” In the configuration, a thin B-pillar supported the roof structure while all four doors used frameless door glass in the style of a hardtop or convertible; the layout would become used by several Ford Motor Company sedans during the 1960s and 1970s.

In what would be the first four-door convertible from a major American manufacturer after World War II, the Lincoln Continental convertible was fitted with a power-operated top on all examples. Deriving its mechanism from the Ford Fairlane 500 Skyliner hardtop convertible, the Continental was fitted with a fabric roof that stored under a rear-hinged deck lid/filler panel. In a similar fashion as the Skyliner, to access the trunk for storage, the deck lid was opened electrically without raising or lowering the roof.

Due to the overlap of the front- and rear-door window weatherstripping on the four-door convertibles (with "suicide" doors), to open the rear door when the front door was closed required that the rear-door window be slightly lowered first. This was accomplished automatically using sensors and relay-controlled logic—when the outside door latch button or inside handle was first pressed, the power-operated window lowered a few inches, then raised when the door was closed.

An option for 1964–1965 was the vertically adjustable steering column. Unlike most tilt-adjustable columns that employ a lever-activated locking pivot joint just behind the steering wheel the Lincoln version employed a vacuum-actuated clamp, a dash-mounted height indicator window and a pivot point further down the column.

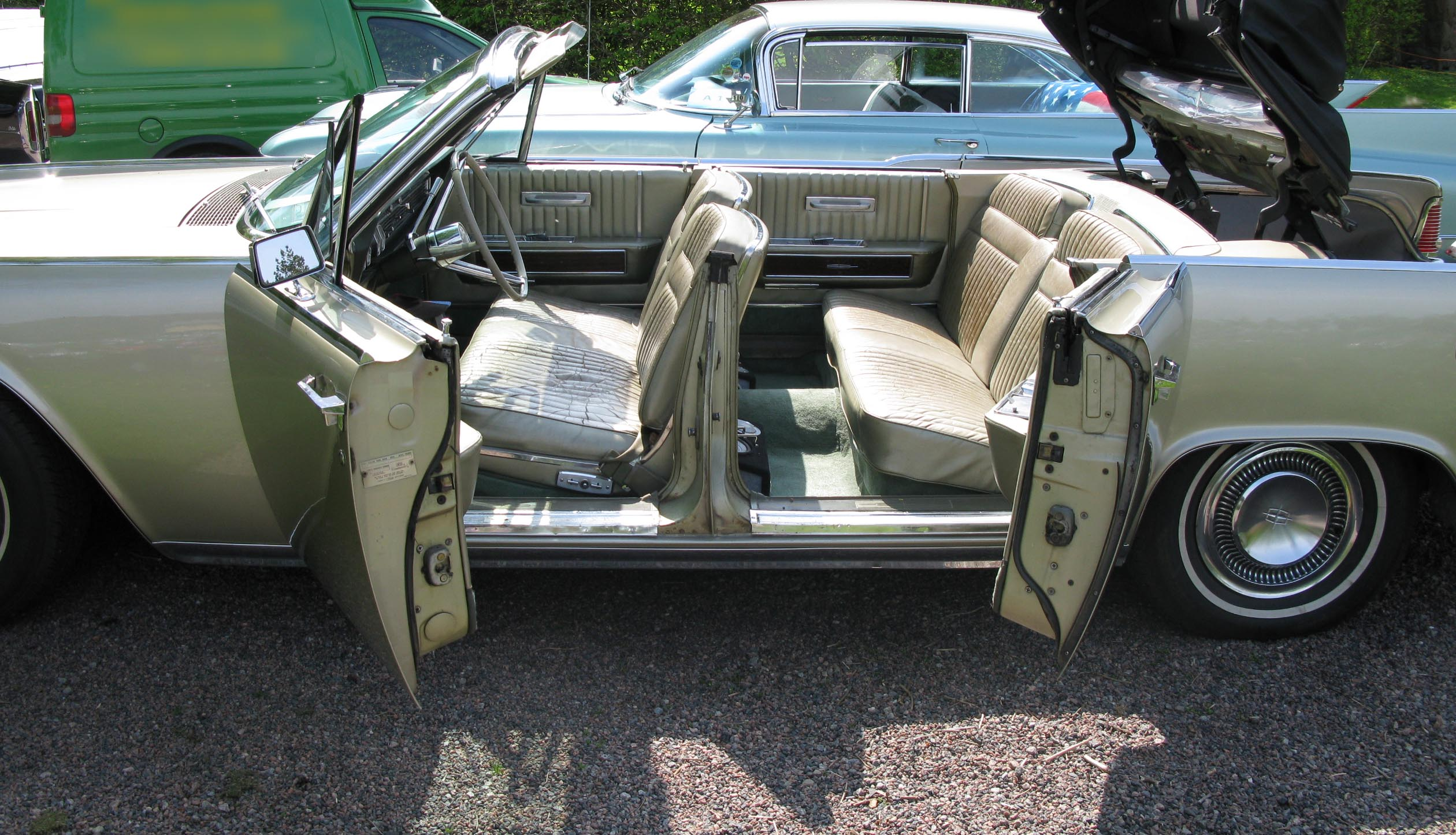
Lincoln Continental

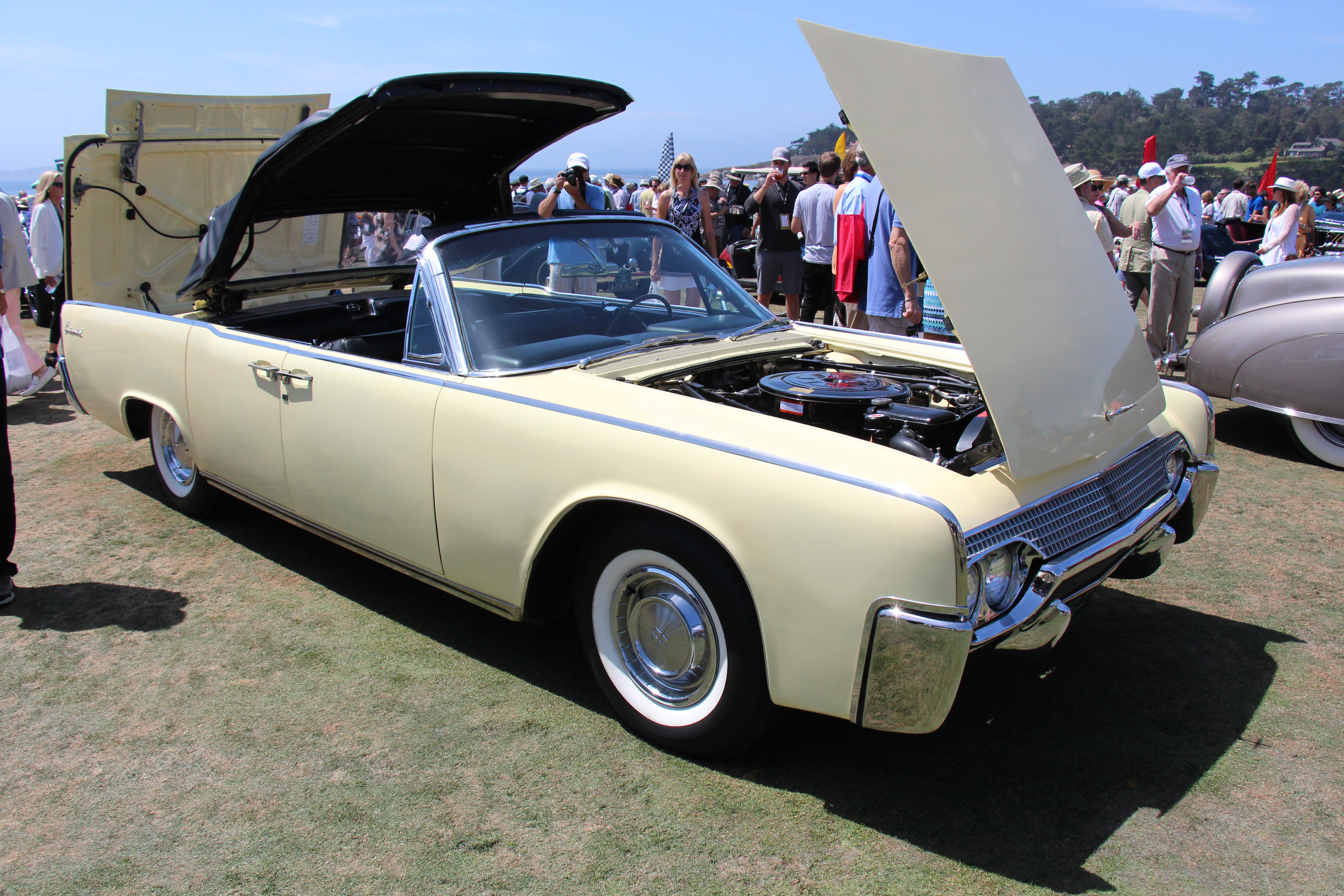
Lincoln Continental convertible

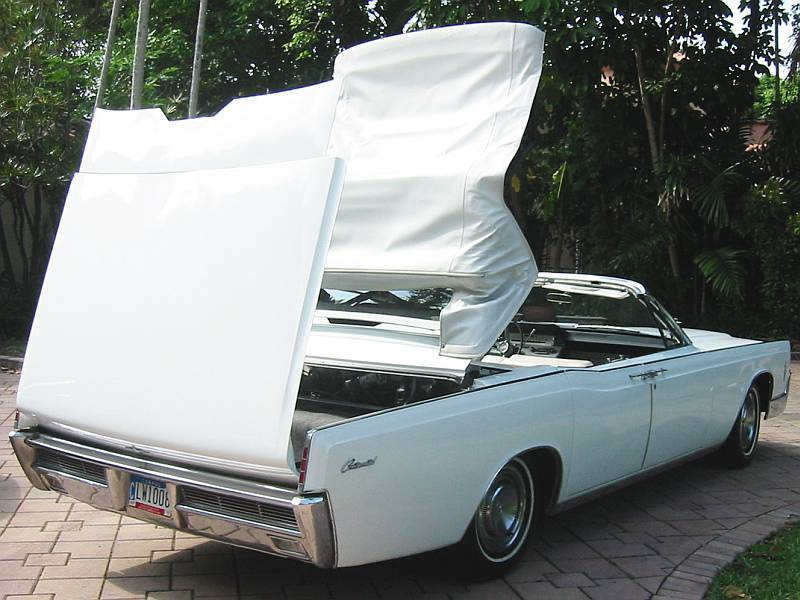
Lincoln Continental convertible

=== Model timeline ===
During its production, the fourth-generation Lincoln Continental would be produced in three versions, undergoing model revisions in 1964 and 1966.

=== 1961–1963 ===
The 1961 Lincoln Continental was introduced with four-door sedan and four-door convertible versions, replacing the Lincoln Premiere and Lincoln Continental Mark V. For the first time in a car manufactured in the United States, the Lincoln Continental was sold with a 2 year/ 24,000 mi (39,000 km) bumper-to-bumper warranty. California walnut veneer was used on the doors and instrument panel.

For 1962, a simpler front grille design with floating rectangles and a thin center bar replaced the heavy-gauge, Thunderbird-like, high mounted bumper of the '61.

For 1963, the Continental underwent several functional updates. The front seatbacks were modified in an effort to increase rear seat legroom. To increase luggage space, the trunklid was reshaped. In line with a number of vehicles in the United States, the electrical charging system introduced an alternator, replacing the generator.

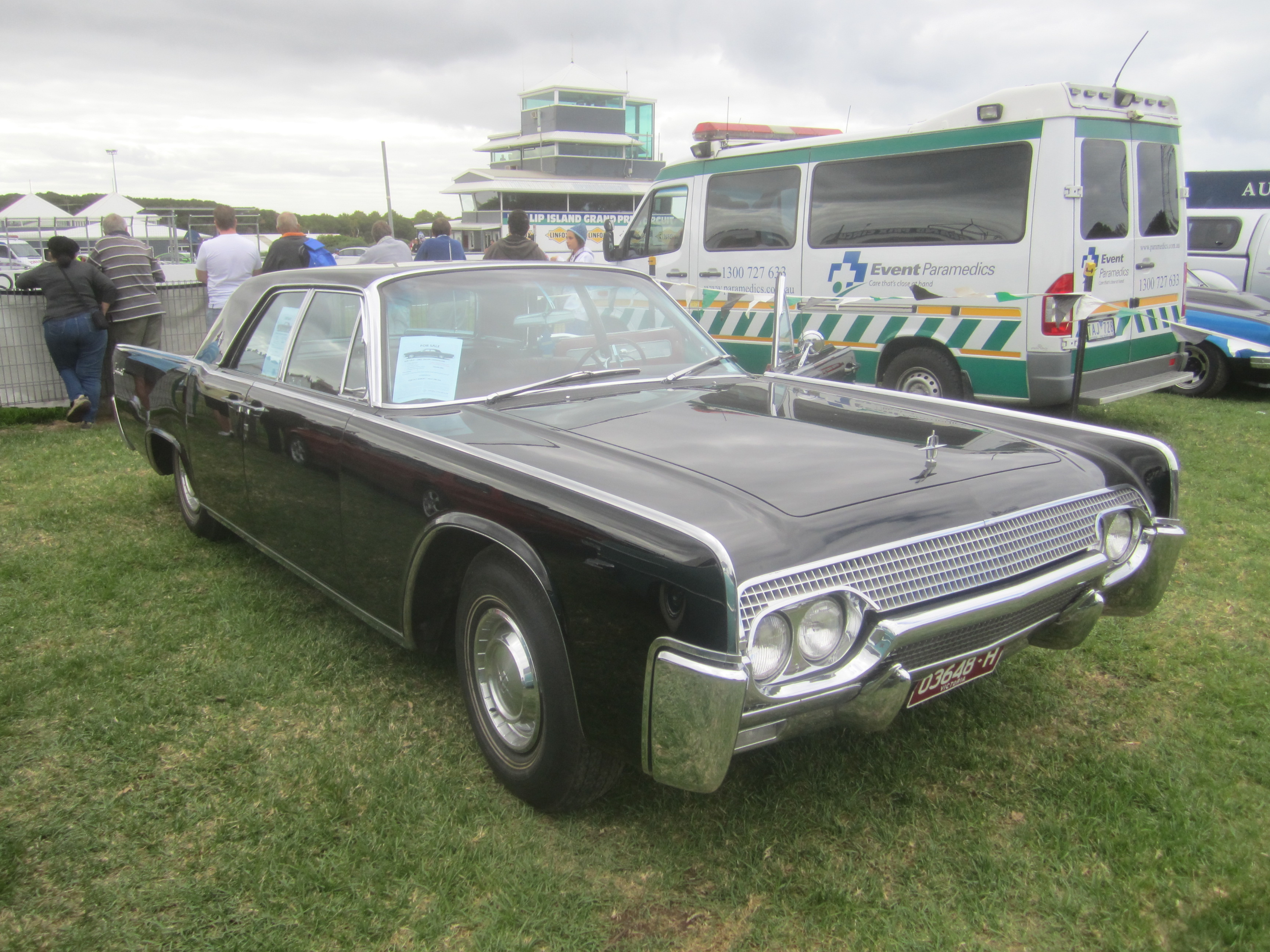
1961 Lincoln Continental sedan

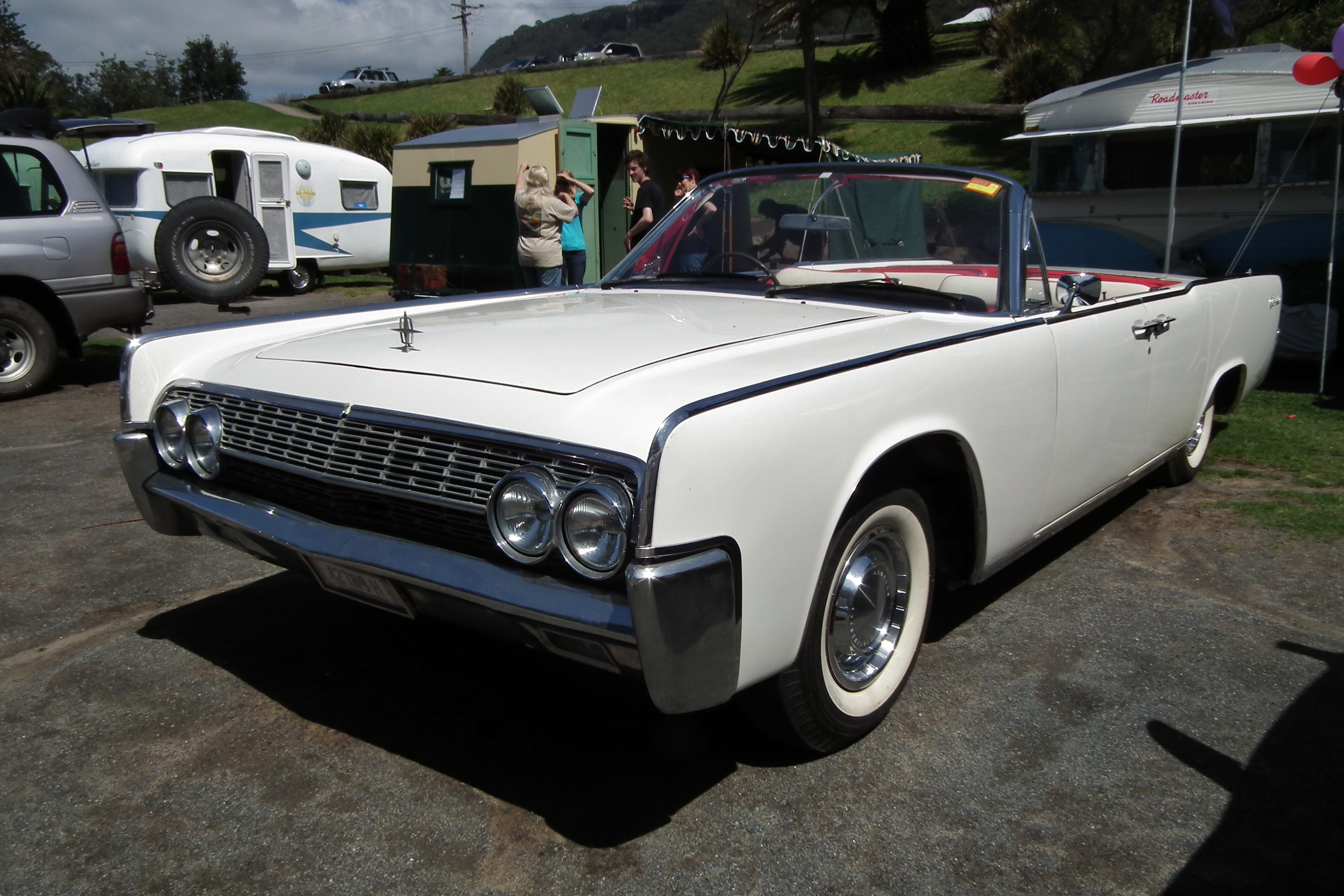
1962 Lincoln Continental convertible (Australian right-hand drive)

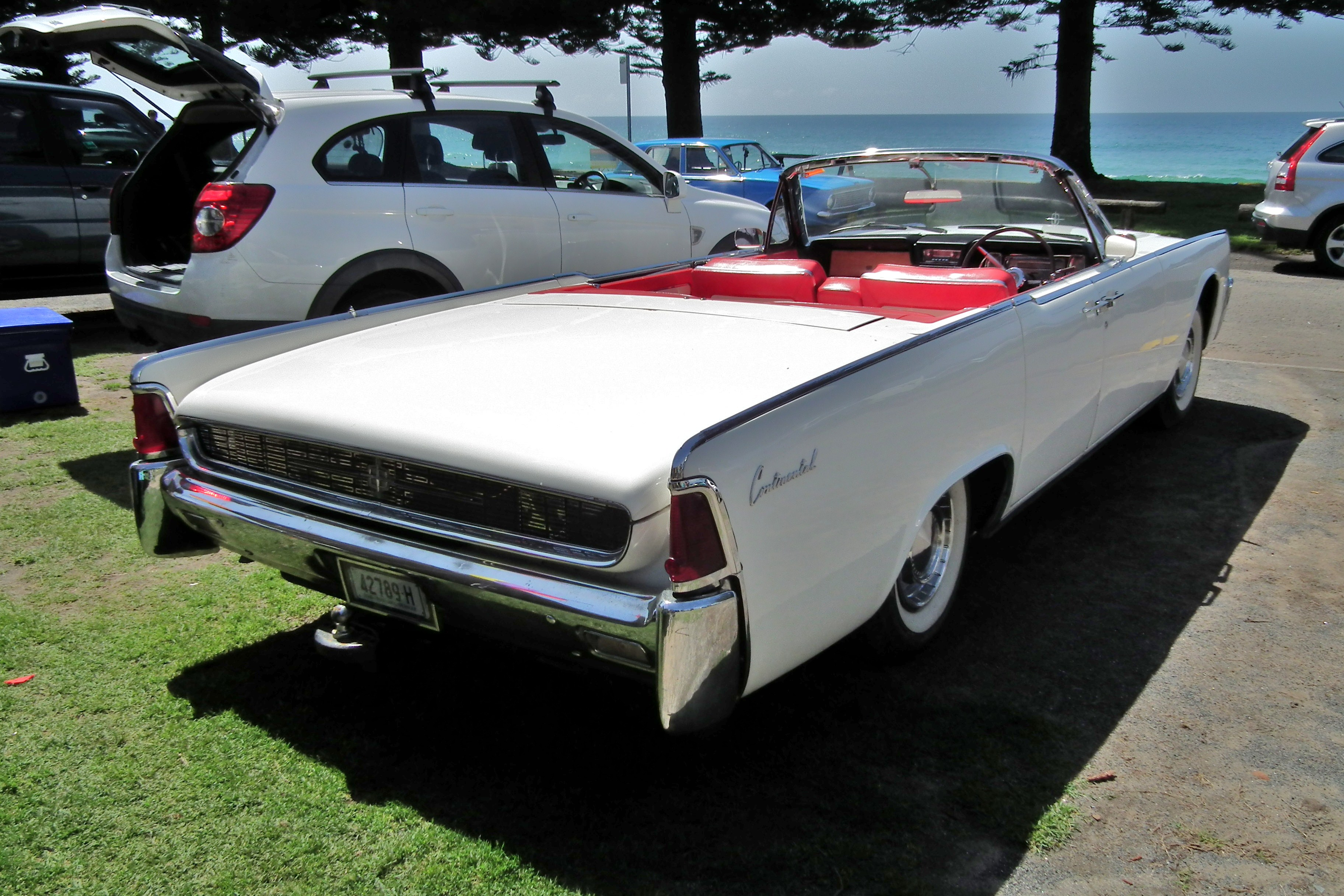
1962 Lincoln Continental convertible

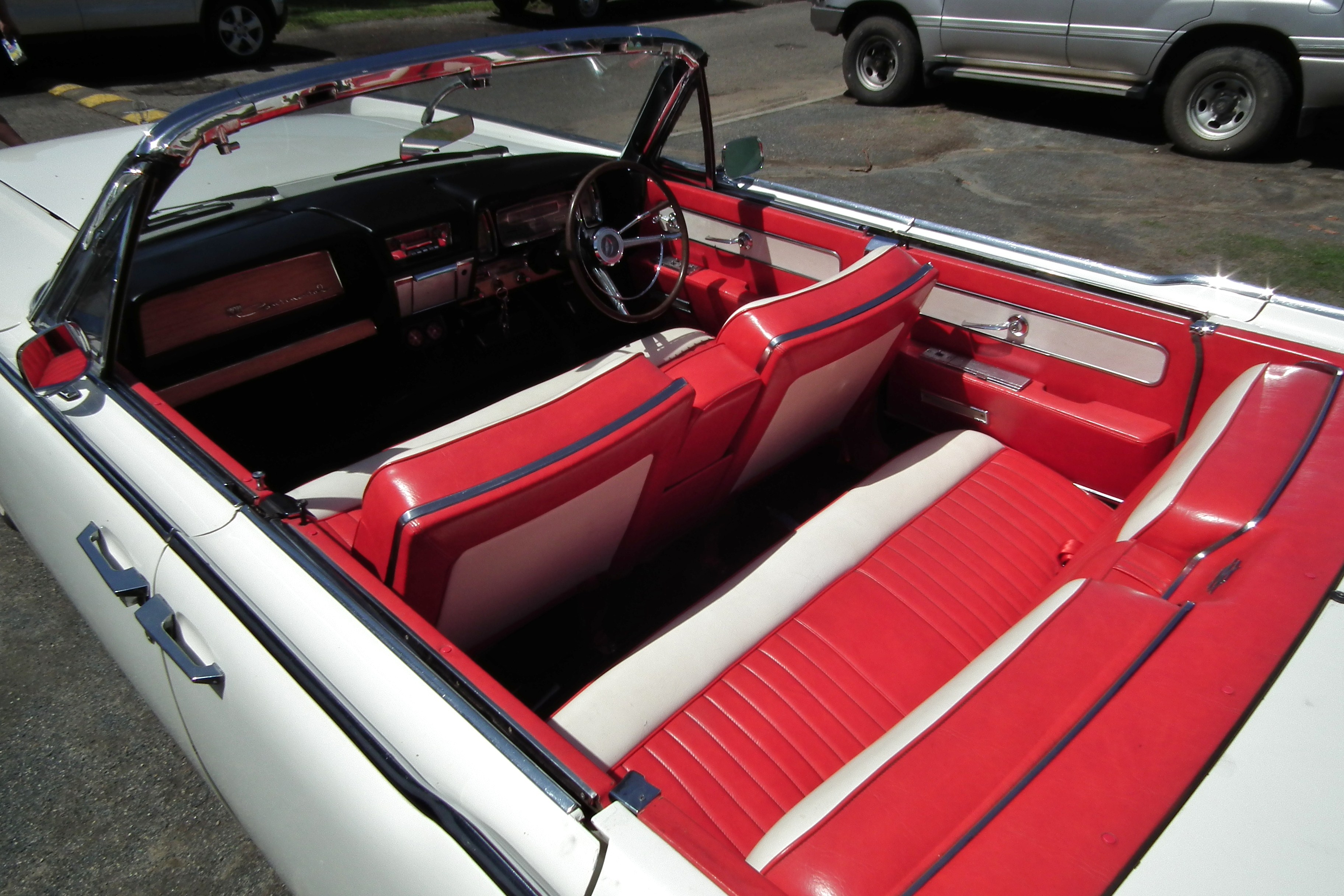
1962 Lincoln Continental convertible (Australian right-hand drive)

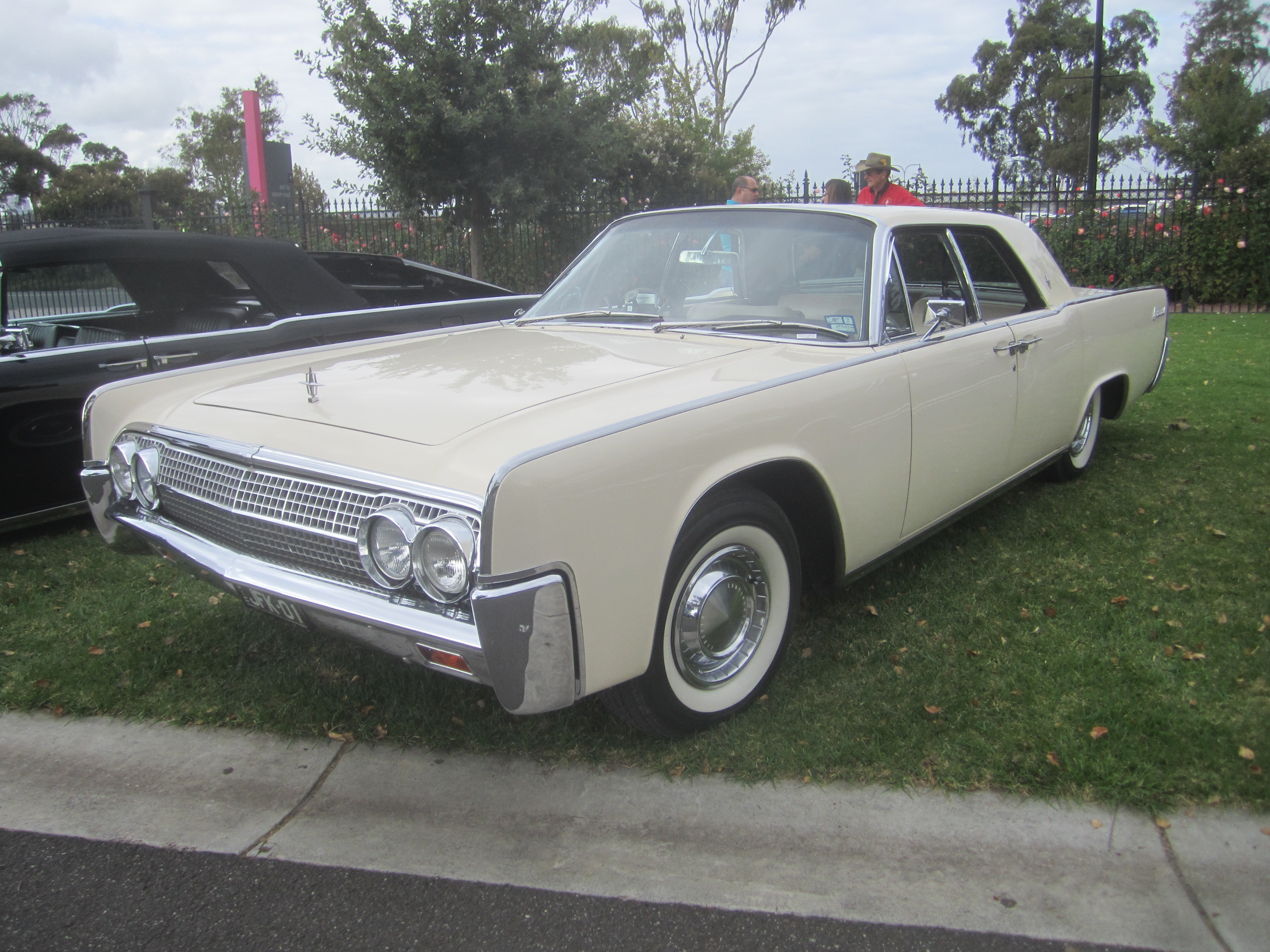
1963 Lincoln Continental

=== 1964–1965 ===
For 1964, the Lincoln Continental underwent its first mid-cycle redesign. Alongside styling updates, several functional changes were focused towards increasing rear-seat space. The wheelbase was increased from 123 to 126 inches, shifting the rear seats backward. The roofline underwent several changes, with the adoption of flat side glass (replacing curved window glass). To increase rear headroom, the rear roofline became additionally squared off, in a notchback style.

In a slight exterior restyling, to eliminate the "electric shaver" appearance, the front fascia added vertical chrome accents to the grille; the recessed rear grille was replaced by a much simpler decklid with trim panel (moving the fuel-filler door to the left-rear fender). The interior was completely revised with a full-width instrument panel, updated upholstery patterns, door panels and fittings.

In 1964, Lincoln debuted the Continental Town Brougham concept car, which had a 131-inch wheelbase, overall length at 221.3, and had a retractable glass partition between the front and rear compartments, with an exposed area over the front compartment, in typical 1930s style town car/brougham appearance.

For 1965, Lincoln made additional updates to the Continental. In a styling change, the convex "electric shaver" front fascia was replaced by a more angular blunt hood with an upright flat grille design. As part of the redesign, the front turn signals and parking lights are moved from the front bumpers to wraparound lenses on the front fenders, with similar parking lights/turn signals on the rear; all four lights received metal trim to match the horizontal lines of the new grille. To improve braking ability, the Continental was given Kelsey-Hayes disc brakes for the front wheels; in addition, front seat belts with retractors became standard.

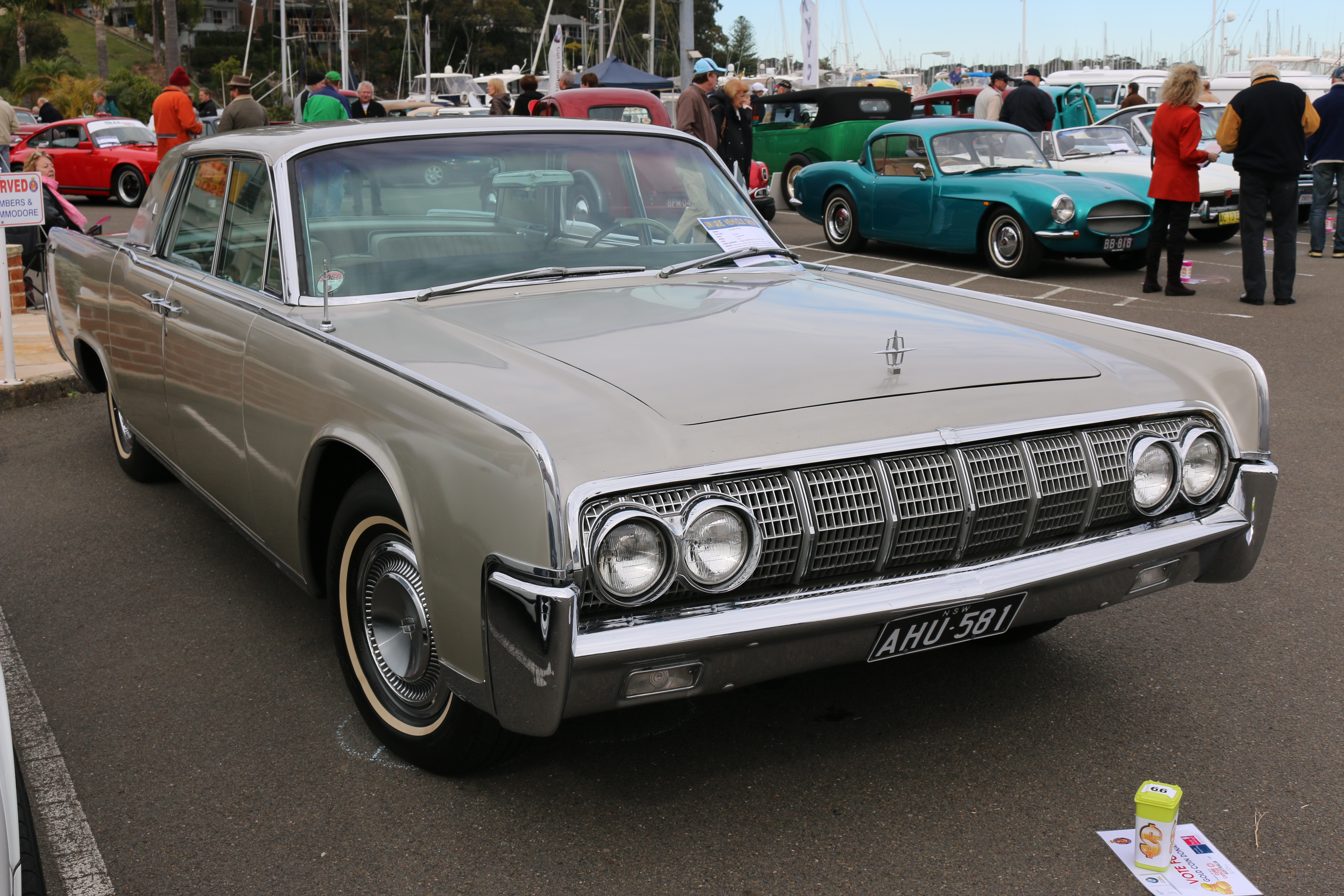
1964 Lincoln Continental sedan

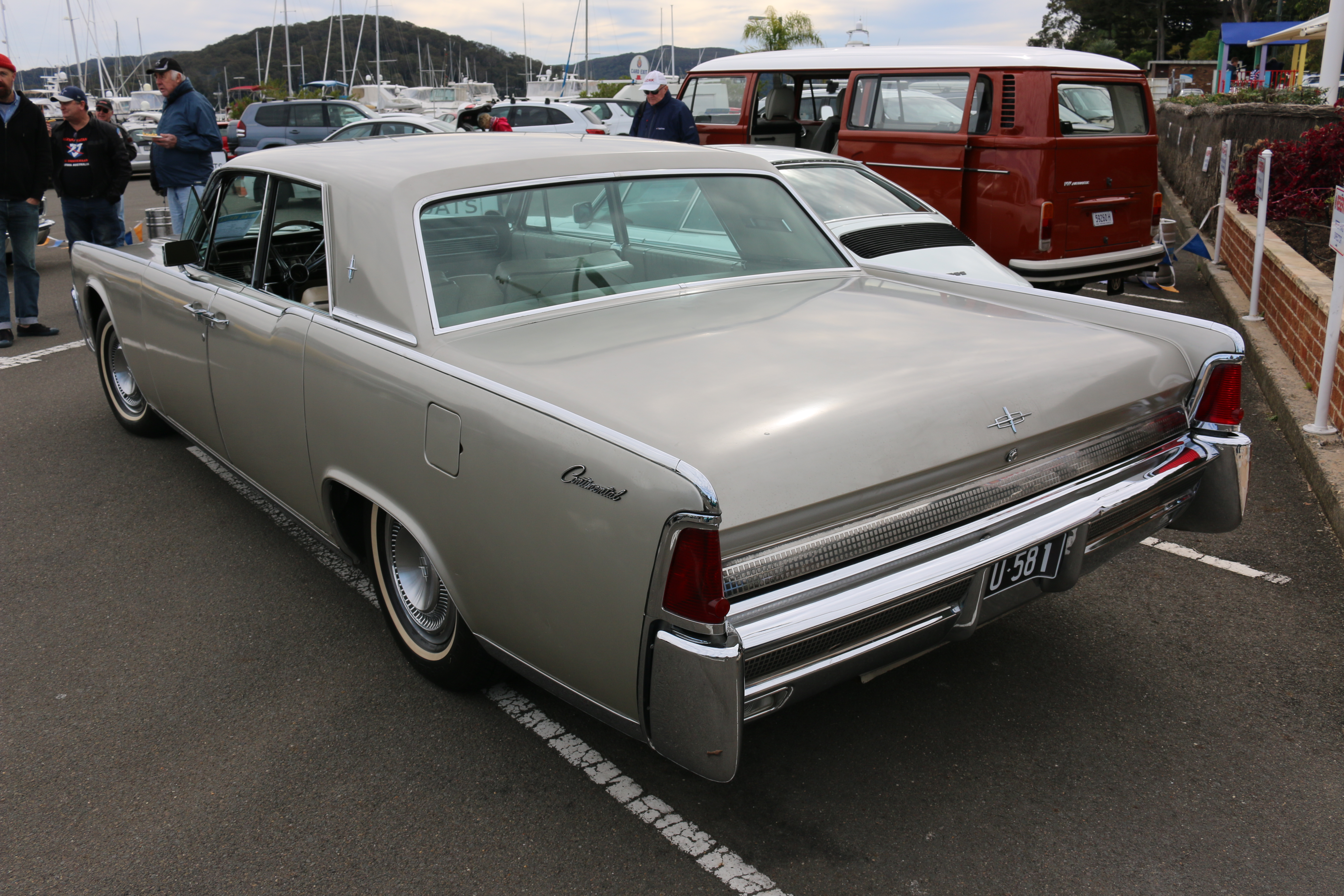
1964 Lincoln Continental sedan, rear

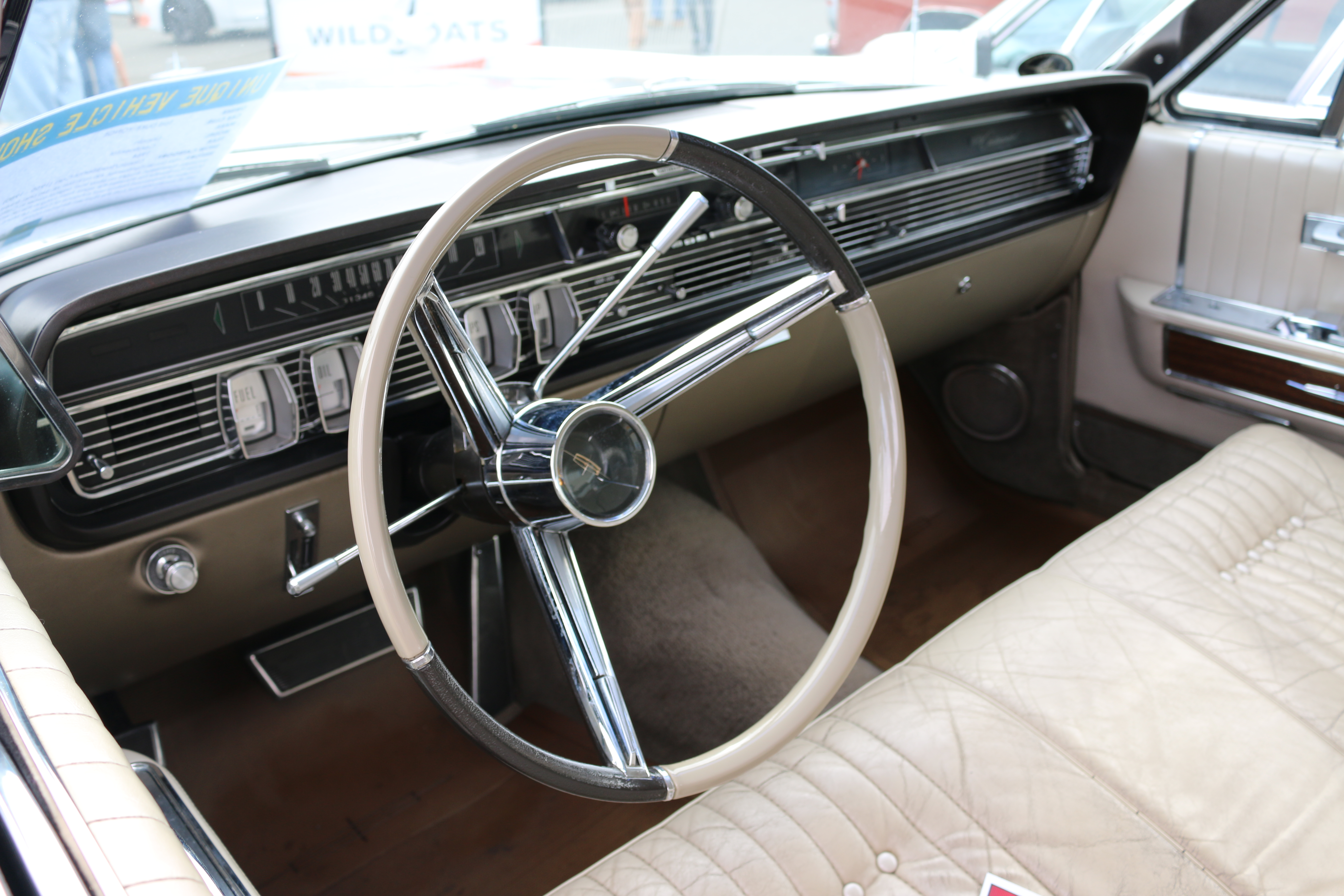
1964 Lincoln Continental sedan, interior

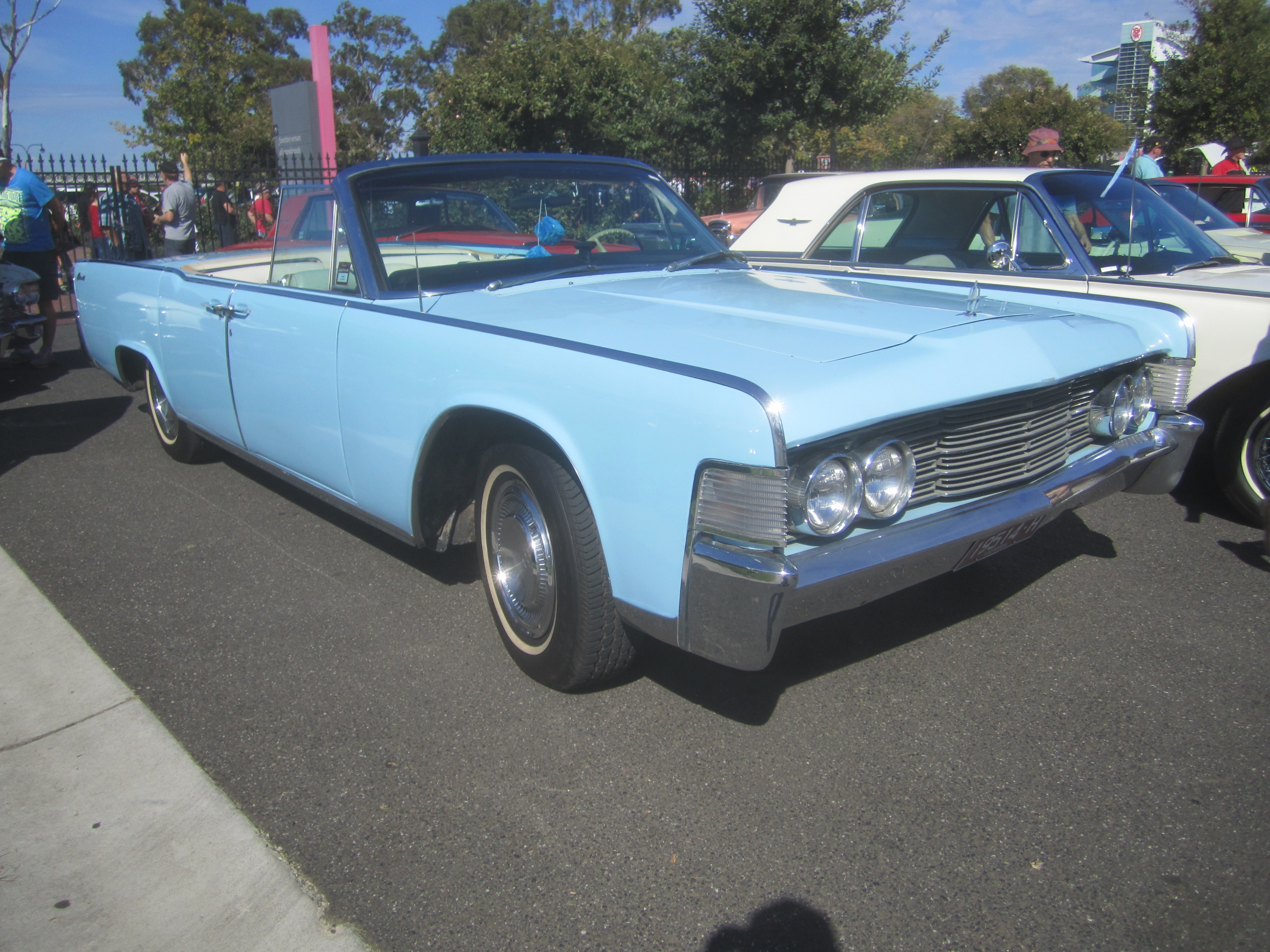
1965 Lincoln Continental convertible

=== 1966–1969 ===
For 1966, the fourth-generation Lincoln Continental underwent a second mid-cycle redesign. To better compete against the Cadillac Coupe de Ville and the Imperial Crown Coupe, Lincoln introduced its first two-door pillarless hardtop since 1960. The convertible remained offered solely as a four-door. In an effort to increase sales of the five year-old model range, Lincoln reduced the price of the Continental nearly $600 from 1965 while keeping equipment levels identical. The marketing decision proved successful; boosted by the introduction of the two-door body style, the model range increased sales by 36%.

While following much of the 1965 restyling (distinguished in '66 largely by a new grille and the addition of "Continental" to the hood), the 1966 Lincoln Continental wore an all new body, growing 5 inches longer (implemented primarily in the rear seats to accommodate more legroom), and nearly an inch taller and wider. Curved side glass made its return (with less obvious tumblehome, to increase interior room). To offer an engine sized comparably to those in the Imperial (440 cubic inches in 1966) and Cadillac (429 cubic inches, 472 cubic inches in 1968), the 430 V8 was enlarged to 462 cubic inches.

The convertible underwent several equipment revisions for the first time, adding a glass rear window and the top mechanism added a second hydraulic pump for opening the convertible roof and the trunklid (making the two systems separate); hydraulic solenoids were deleted from the top mechanism. The interior underwent several revisions, adding a tilt steering wheel and an 8-track tape player as options.

For 1967, the Lincoln Continental was given only minor trim updates, with the deletion of the Lincoln star emblem from the front fenders being the largest change. Several functional changes were made, as Lincoln added a number of indicator lights to the dashboard. Along with an oil pressure warning light, the dashboard was given indicator lights for an open trunk and the cruise control (if on). Following federal safety mandates, lap safety seatbelts became standard equipment, coupled with an energy-absorbing steering column.

Following years of decreasing sales, 1967 marked the final year of the Lincoln Continental convertible, with only 2,276 sold. After becoming the first four-door convertible sold after World War II, the Lincoln Continental would become the final (as of the 2018 model year) example of its type sold by an American manufacturer. As a result of numerous frame reinforcements required by the lack of a fixed roof, the 5,712 lb (2,591 kg) 1967 Lincoln Continental convertible is one of the heaviest passenger cars ever sold by Ford Motor Company.

For 1968, Lincoln made several styling changes to the Continental. To meet federal safety standards, the parking lights, taillights, and front turn signals were returned to a wraparound design on the fenders to satisfy Federal standards for side marker lights. For the interior, torso seatbelts were added for the outboard front seats. The "Continental" wording was removed from the front fascia, replaced by the Lincoln star emblem (as seen on the rear); the hood ornament was deleted, in anticipation of a federal ban on the feature (which never came to effect). The new 460 cu in (7.5 L) Ford "Lima" engine was to be available at the beginning of the model year, but there were so many 462 cu in (7.6 L) Ford MEL engine engines still available, the 460 was phased in later that year. In April, the new Mark III made its debut, as a 1969 model. Total sales would be down to just 39,134.

For 1969, few changes were made in the final year of production. To comply with federal regulations, the front seats were updated with head restraints for the outboard passengers. The front fascia was updated, with the grille enlarged for the first time since 1966, with the "Continental" wording returning above the grille. Shared with the Mark III, the 460 V8 became the sole engine for the Lincoln Continental, paired with the Ford C6 3-speed automatic transmission.

After a nine-year hiatus, the Town Car name made a return in 1969 as part of an interior trim option package for the Continental.

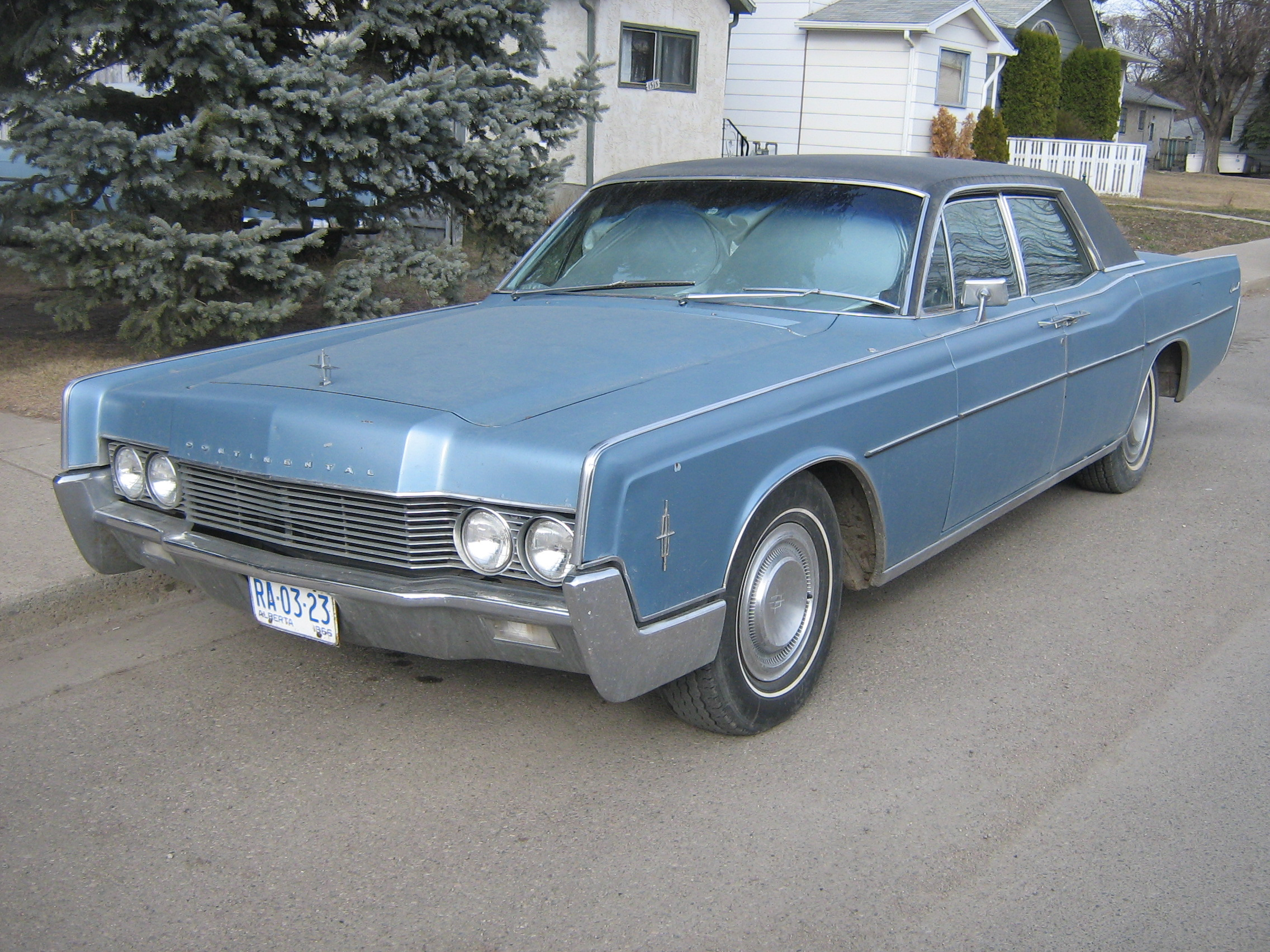
1966 Lincoln Continental sedan

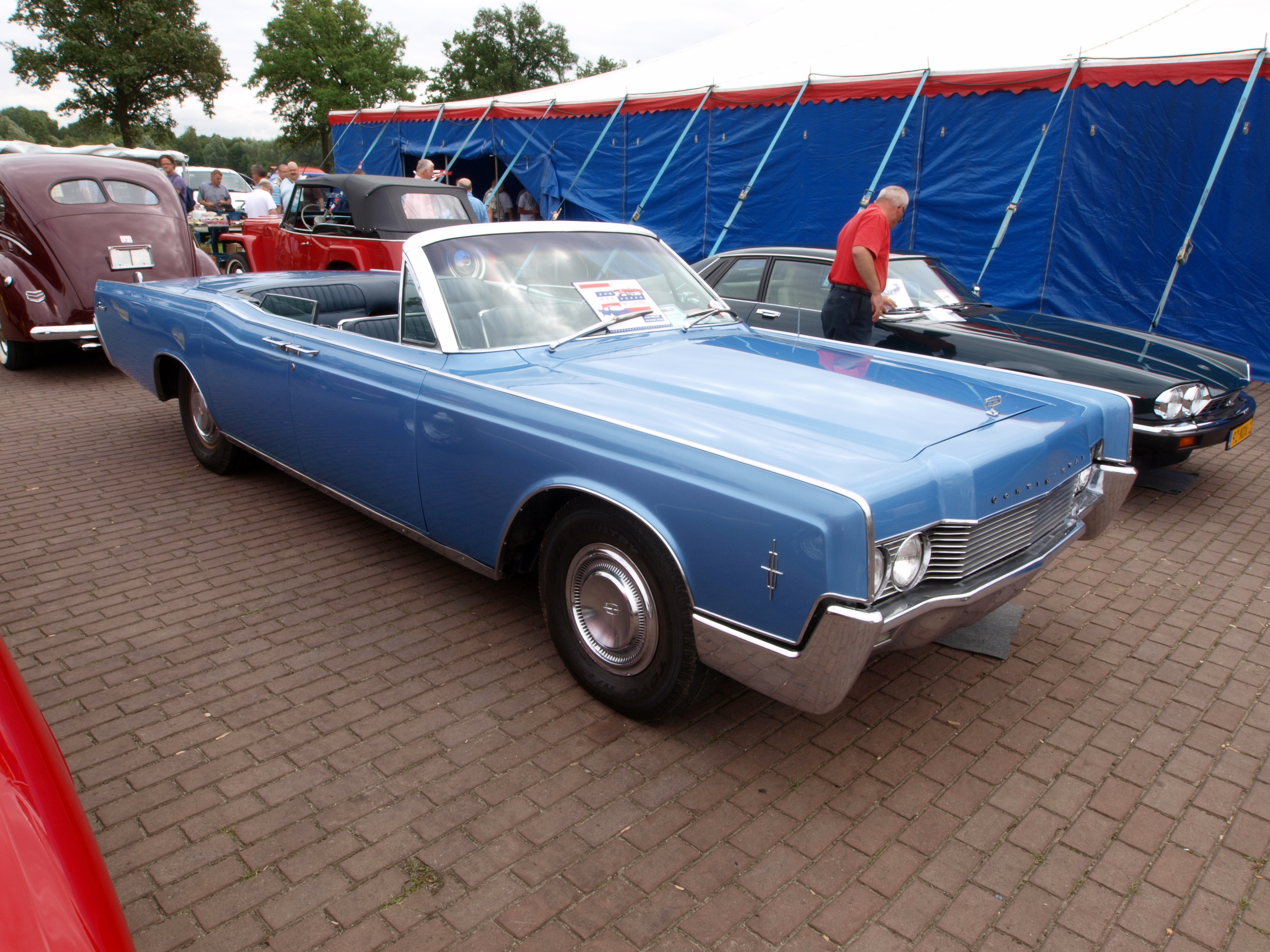
1966 Lincoln Continental convertible

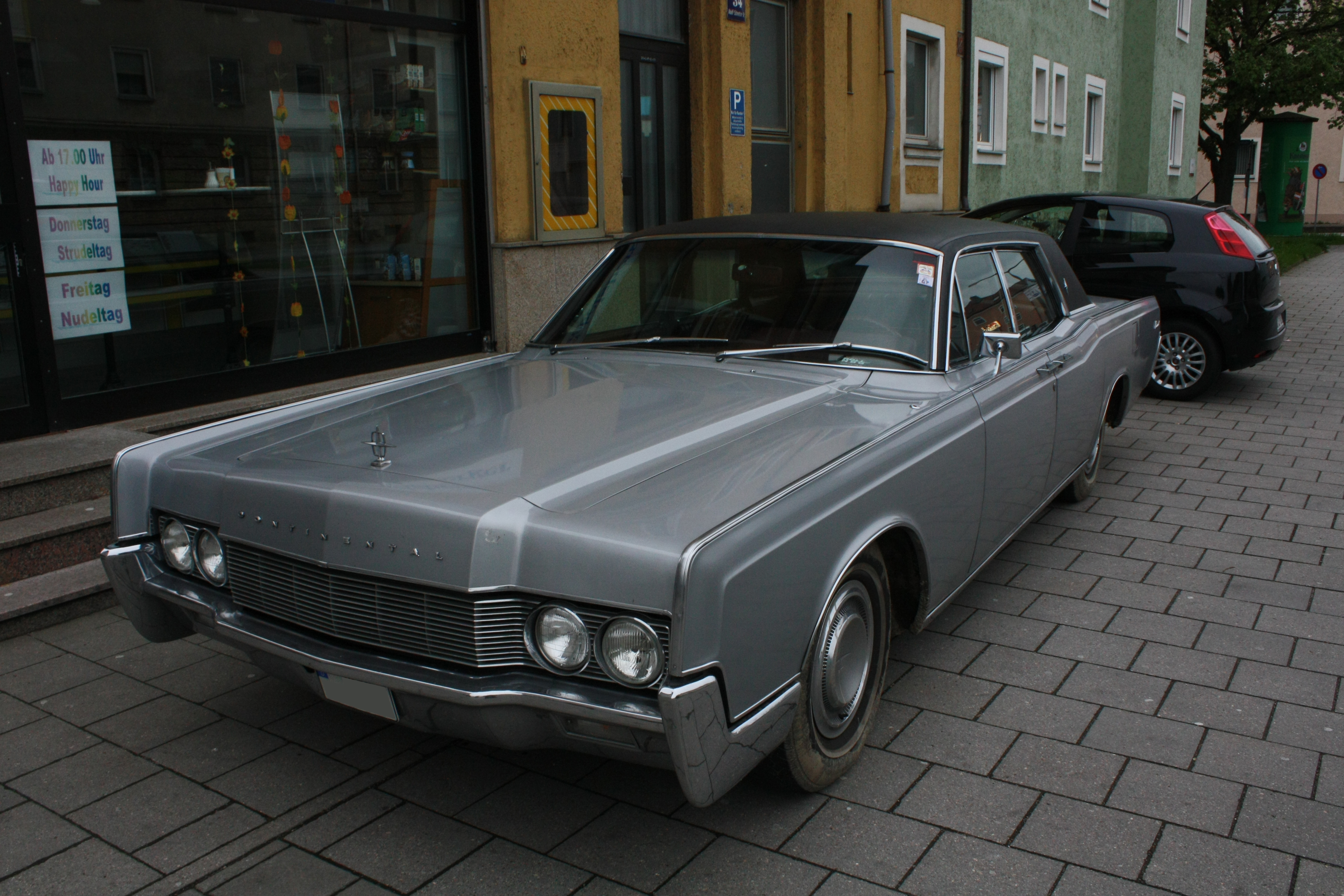
1967 Lincoln Continental four-door sedan

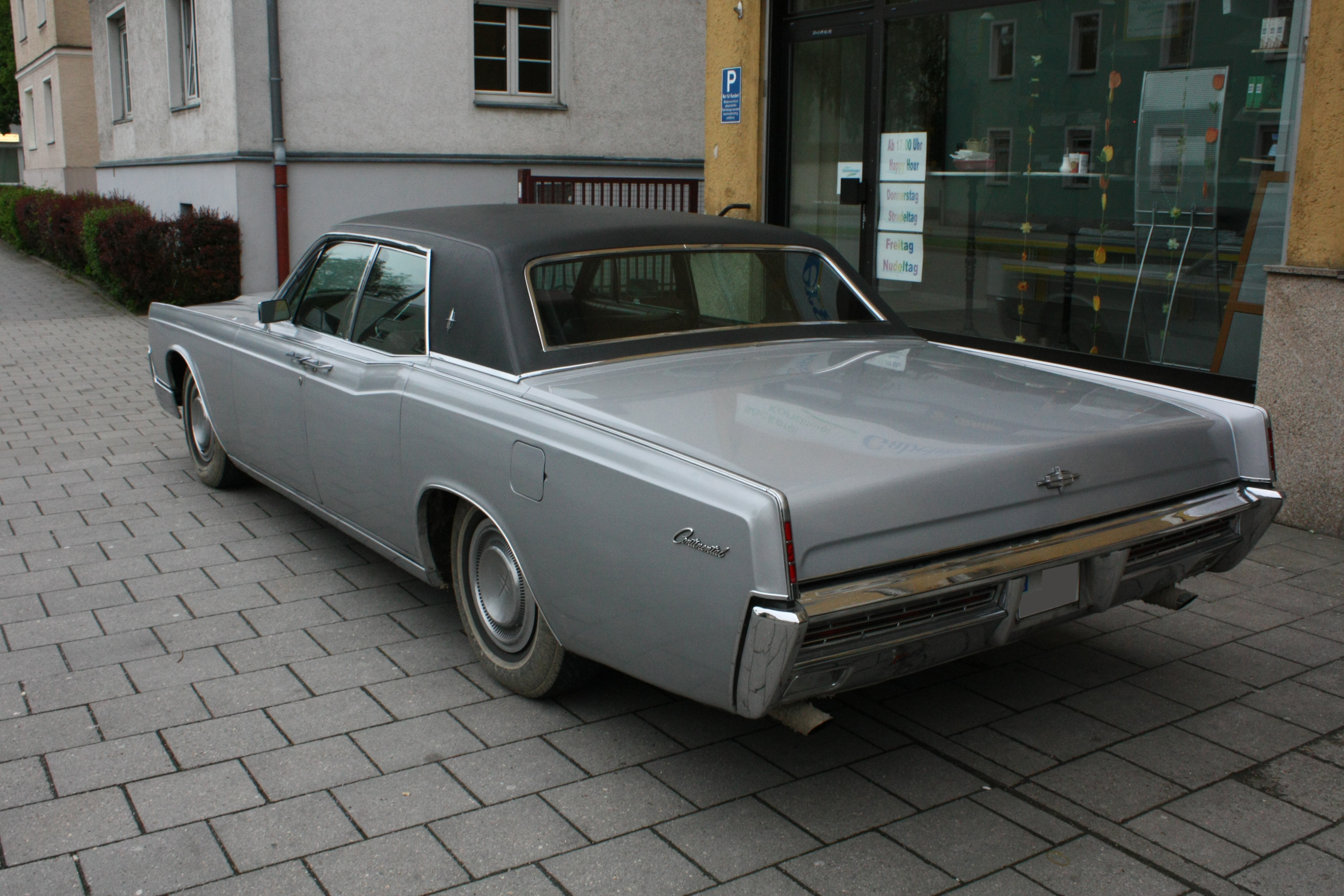
1967 Lincoln Continental four-door sedan, rear view

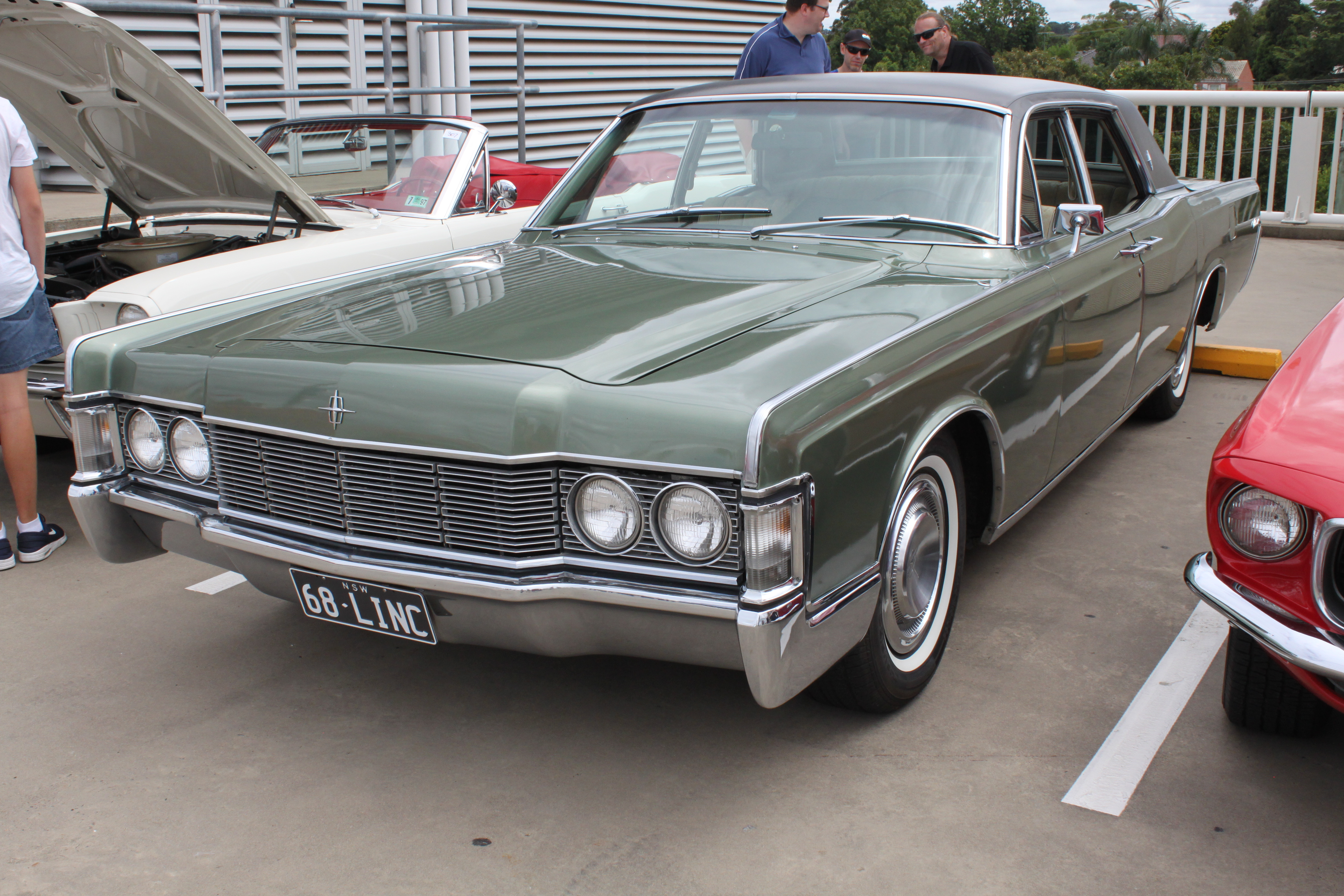
1968 Lincoln Continental four-door sedan

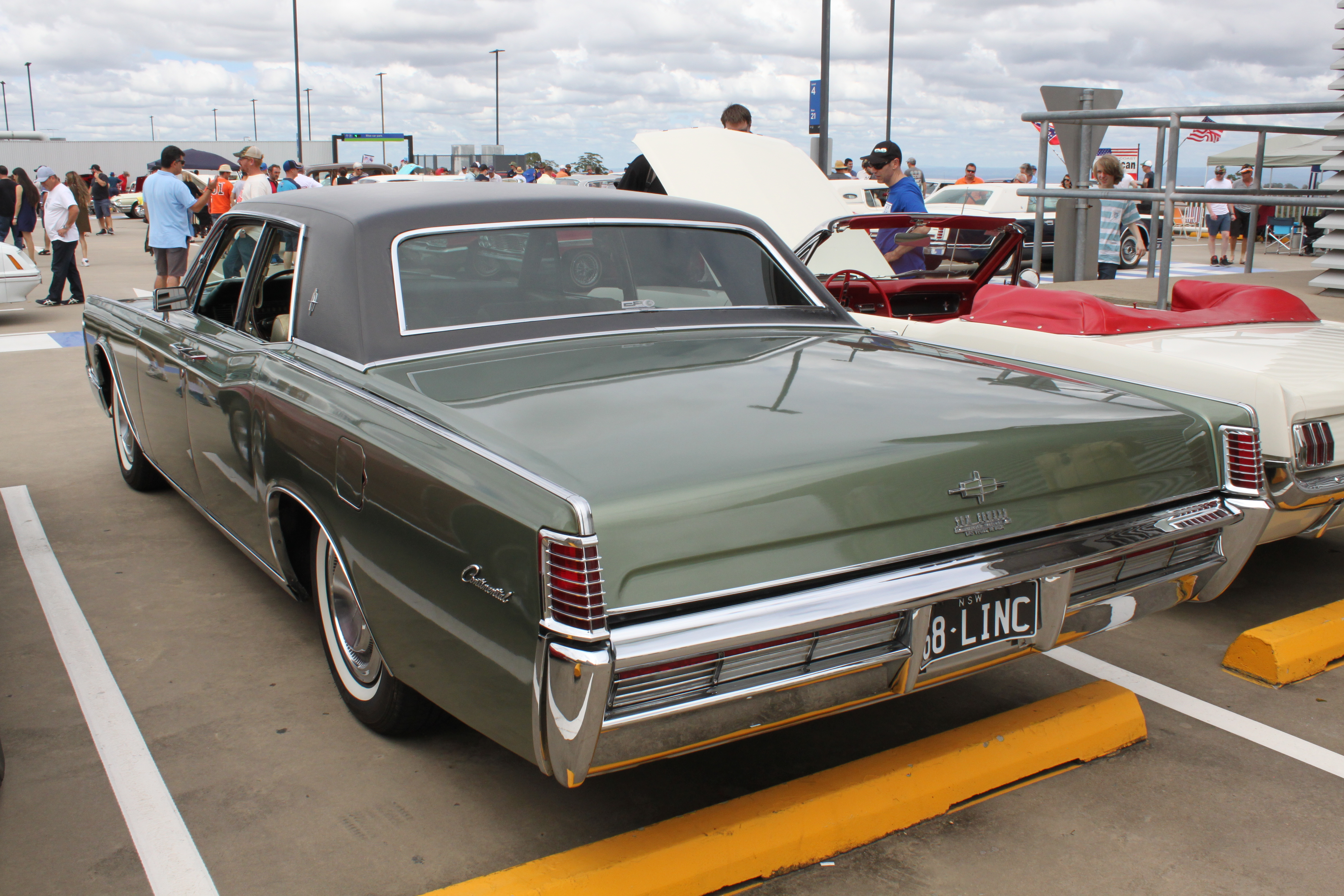
1968 Lincoln Continental sedan, rear view

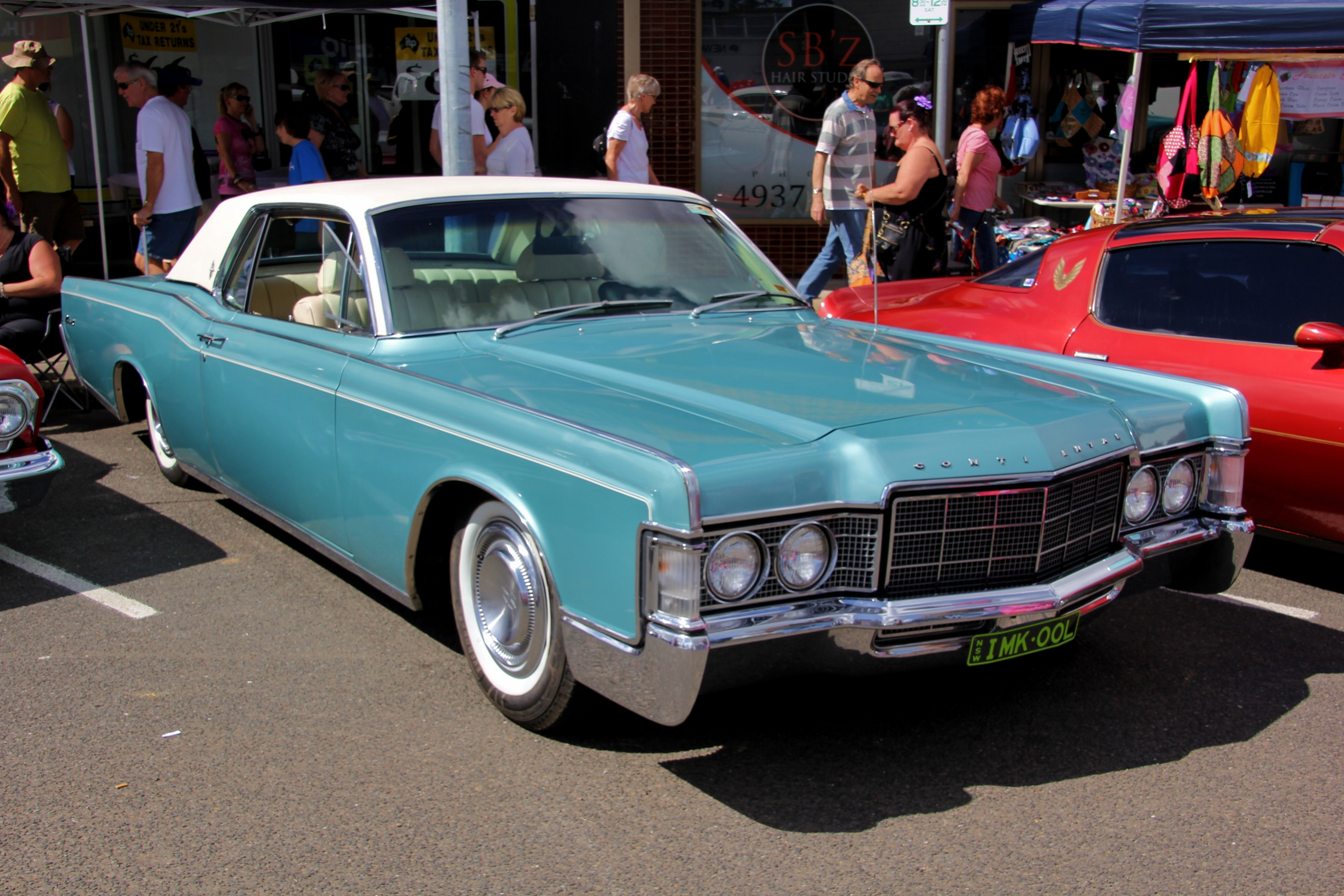
1969 Lincoln Continental hardtop coupe

=== Presidential state cars ===
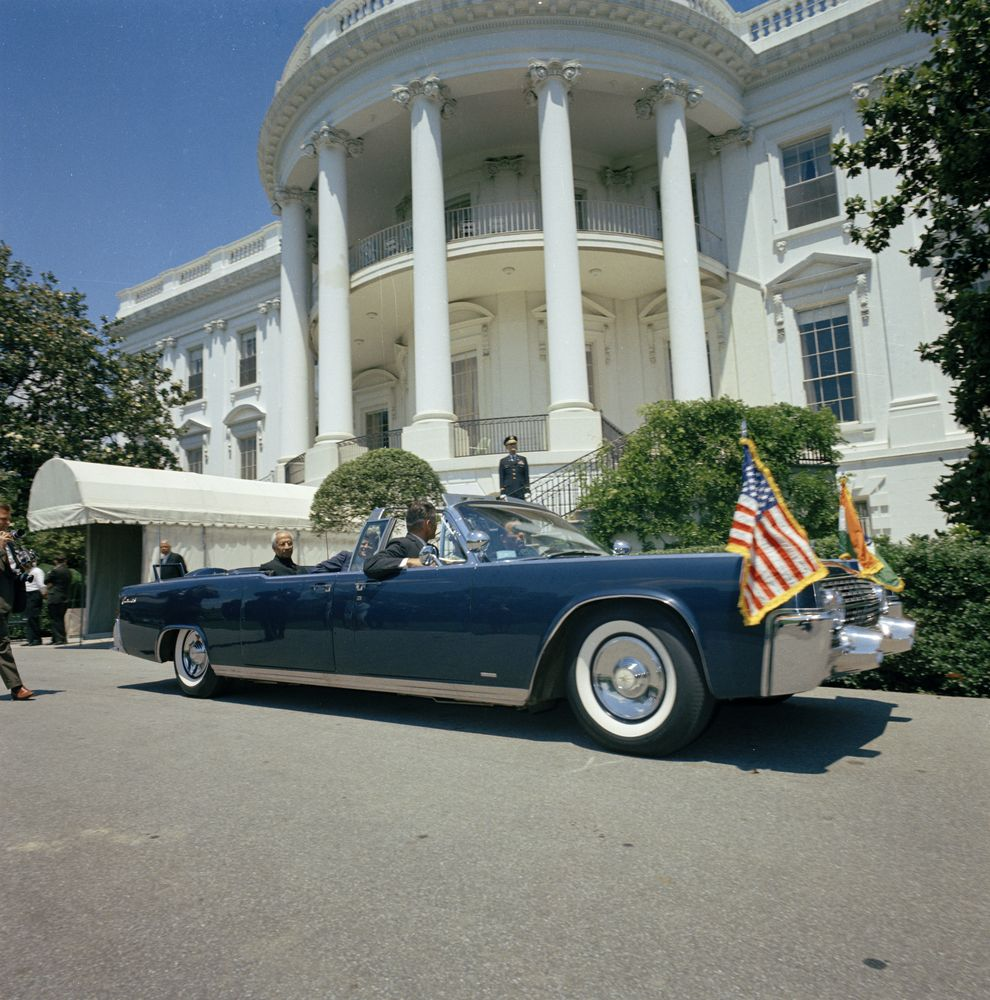
1961 Lincoln Continental Presidential State car SS-100-X with US President John F. Kennedy and Indian President Dr. Sarvepalli Radhakrishnan outside the White House in June 1963

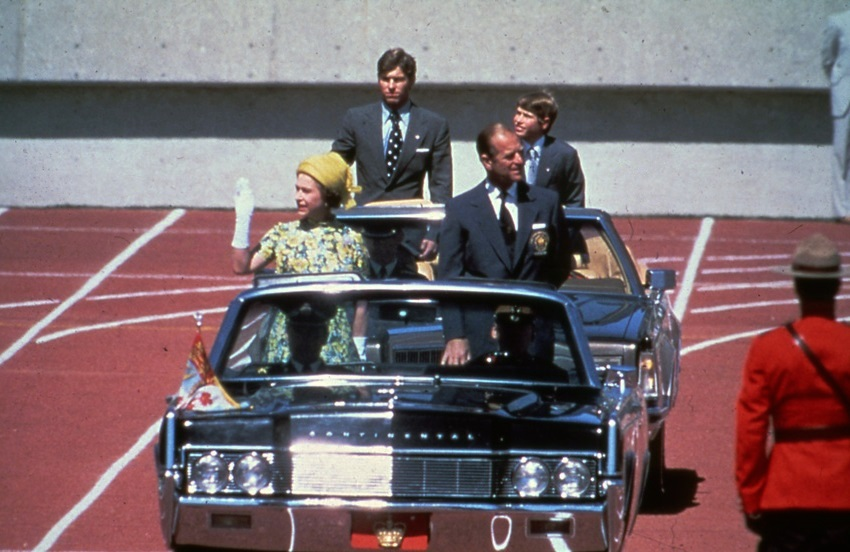
British royal family in a Lincoln Continental (Canada, 1967)

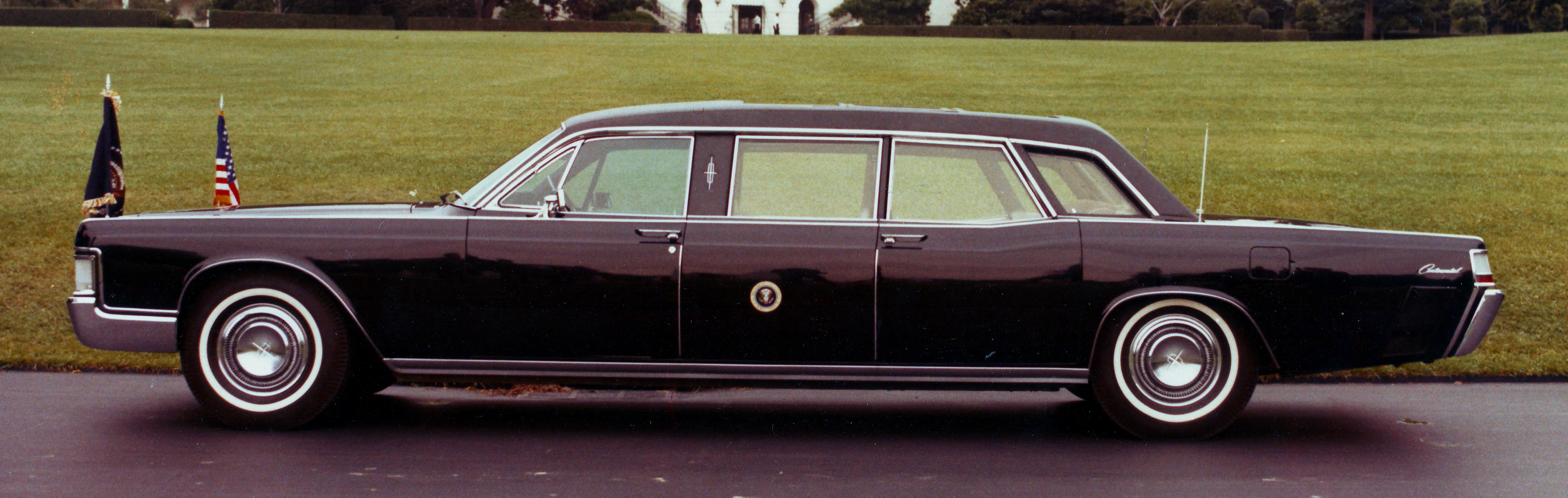
1969 Lincoln Continental Presidential State Car

The Secret Service acquired two versions of the fourth-generation Lincoln Continental for use as a presidential state car, serving from 1961 to 1977.

SS-100-X is a 1961 Lincoln Continental limousine modified by Hess & Eisenhardt of Cincinnati, Ohio. Designed as an open car with a series of tops for inclement weather, the car was rebuilt with a permanent roof, armoring, and bulletproof glass following the 1963 assassination of John F. Kennedy. Subsequently, all United States presidential limousines have been constructed as armored vehicles.

The Secret Service acquired a 1969 Lincoln Continental limousine for Richard Nixon; although an armored vehicle, the limousine roof was designed with a sunroof to allow President Nixon to stand in the vehicle to greet crowds in a motorcade.

=== Sales ===
Model Year	Total Sales
1961	25,160
1962	31,061
1963	31,233
1964	36,297
1965	40,180
1966	54,755
1967	45,667
1968	39,134
1969	30,858

== Fifth generation (1970–1979) ==
Fifth generation
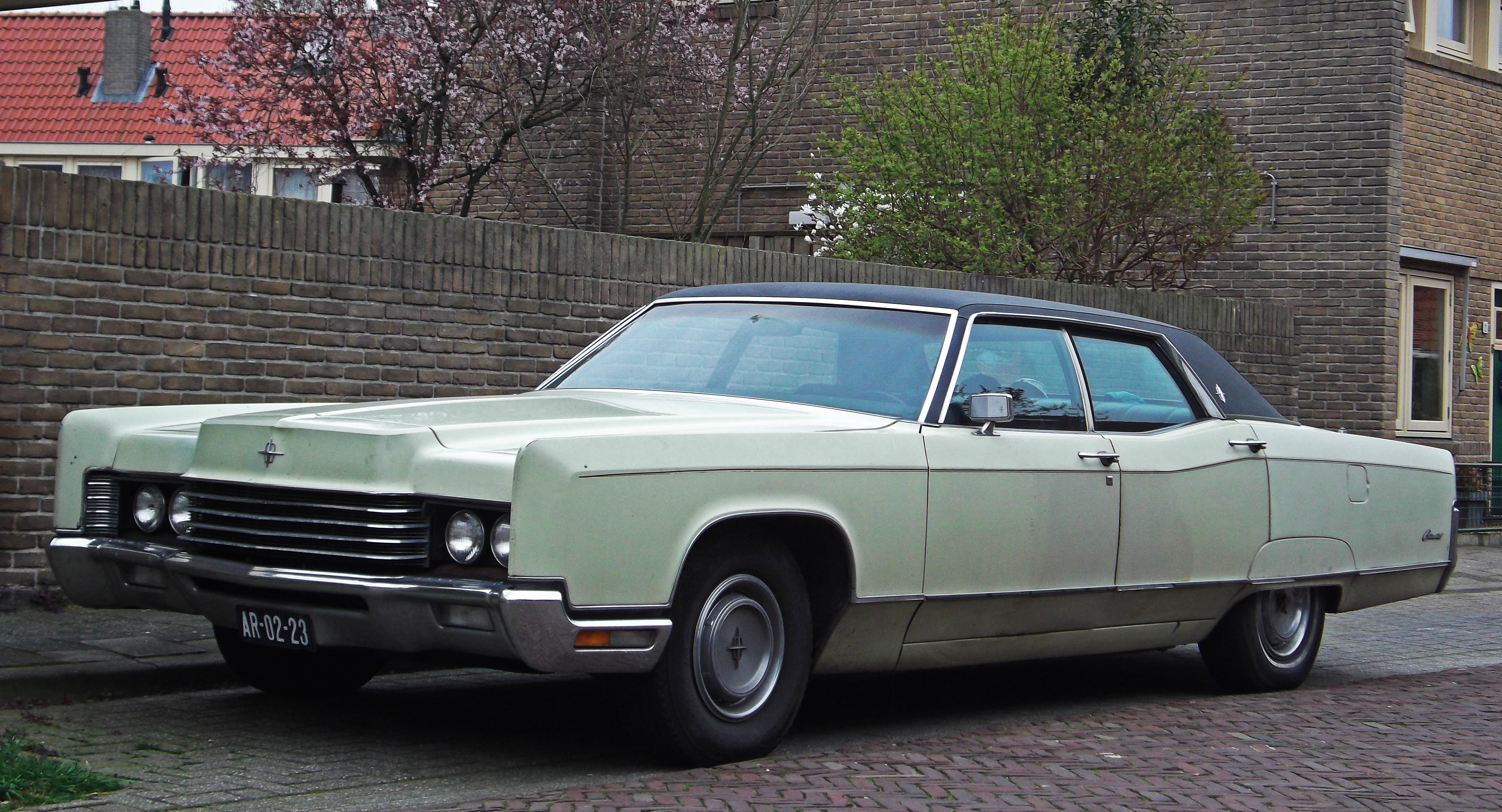
- 1970 Lincoln Continental sedan

Overview
- Model years: 1970–1979
- Assembly: United States: Wixom, Michigan (Wixom Assembly)
- Designer: Buzz Grisinger

Body and chassis
- Body style: 2-door hardtop 2-door coupe 4-door pillared hardtop
- Layout: FR layout
- Platform: Full-size Ford
- Chassis: body-on-frame
- Related: Ford LTD; Mercury Marquis

Powertrain
- Engine: 400 cu in (6.6 L) 335-series V8; 460 cu in (7.5 L) 385-series V8
- Transmission: 3-speed C6 automatic

Dimensions
- Wheelbase: 1970–73: 127.0 in (3,226 mm); 1974–79: 127.2 in (3,231 mm)
- Length: 1970–72: 225.0 in (5,715 mm); 1973: 229.9 in (5,839 mm); 1974: 232.6 in (5,908 mm); 1975–76: 232.9 in (5,916 mm); 1977–79: 233.0 in (5,918 mm)
- Width: 1970–73: 79.6 in (2,022 mm); 1974–75: 80.0 in (2,032 mm); 1976: 80.3 in (2,040 mm); 1977: 80.0 in (2,032 mm); 1978–79: 79.9 in (2,029 mm)
- Height: 1970: 55.7 in (1,415 mm); 1971–72: 55.6 in (1,412 mm); 1973: 55.5 in (1,410 mm); 1974: 55.4 in (1,407 mm); 1975: 55.6 in (1,412 mm); 1976: 55.5 in (1,410 mm); 1977: 55.2 in (1,402 mm); 1978–79: 55.4 in (1,407 mm)
- Curb weight: 4,900–5,400 lb (2,200–2,400 kg)

For the 1970 model year, Lincoln introduced the fifth-generation Lincoln Continental. Building on the success of the Mark III introduced the year before, Lincoln sought to modernize the Continental for the 1970s after a nine-year production run.

Although shorter in wheelbase and slightly narrower than 1958–1960 Lincolns, the addition of 5-mph bumpers make 1977–1979 Lincolns the longest automobiles ever produced by Ford Motor Company.

=== Chassis ===
The fifth-generation Lincoln Continental reverted to body-on-frame construction, the first Lincoln to do so since 1957. To save on its engineering and development costs, the Continental was no longer given its own chassis, instead given a longer-wheelbase version of the Mercury Marquis chassis (stretched from 124 inches to 127 inches; 1974–1979 vehicles received a 127.2-inch wheelbase). The 1974 four-door sedan was listed at US$8,238 ($53,780 in 2025 dollars) and 29,351 were sold.

Shared with the LTD and Marquis, the Continental was equipped with coil springs at all four corners. From 1970 to 1974, the Continental was fitted with front disc and rear drum brakes; from 1975 to 1979, four-wheel disc brakes were available.

The 460 cubic-inch V8 returned as the standard engine, and was available from 1970 to 1977; from 1970 to 1972, the 460 remained exclusive to Lincoln. In an effort to increase fuel economy and comply with emissions standards, Lincoln added a 400 cubic-inch V8 for California for 1977, with the 460 remaining available in 49 states. For 1978, the 400 became standard (with the 460 as an option), with the 460 discontinued for 1979. Both engines were paired with the Ford C6 3-speed automatic transmission.

=== Body ===
In a major departure from its fourth-generation predecessor, the 1970 Lincoln Continental's Marquis-based frame forced the sedan to abandon "suicide doors" for conventional front-hinged doors. As with its predecessor and the Mercury Marquis, the Lincoln Continental was offered as a two-door hardtop and as a four-door "pillared hardtop" sedan (B-pillar with frameless door glass). Unlike Ford or Mercury, no Lincoln two-door convertible was introduced.

Shared with the Mark series, the fifth-generation Continental was equipped with vacuum-operated hidden headlamps; as a fail-safe, the headlamp doors were designed to open in the event of failure (a dashboard indicator light indicated their status).

=== Model timeline ===
During its production, the fifth-generation Lincoln Continental was sold in two versions, with a major revision in 1975. Following the downsizing of the full-size General Motors and Chrysler product lines, the Lincoln Continental became the largest mass-market automobile produced worldwide for the 1977 model year. It was surpassed only by purpose-built limousines such as the long-wheelbase version of the Mercedes-Benz 600, the Rolls-Royce Phantom VI, and the ZIL-4104. Following the 1979 downsizing of the Ford LTD and Mercury Marquis, the Lincoln Continental was marketed as the final "traditional" or "large" sedan in the United States.

=== 1970–1974 ===
For 1970, Lincoln introduced a redesigned Continental two-door, Continental four-door, and Continental Town Car; sold only as a four-door, the Town Car was distinguished by a vinyl roof.

For 1971, the grille underwent a minor styling change, partially in an effort to better distinguish the Continental from the Mercury Marquis. The grille and headlight doors were redesigned, with the latter painted in body color. Rear-wheel ABS brakes (called Sure-Trak) was optional.

For 1972, several functional changes were made, as the 460 V8 decreased in compression; though intended to decrease emissions and adapt to unleaded gasoline, output dropped. The tradition of Lincoln-exclusive engines came to an end, as Mercury began use of the 460 in the Mercury Marquis and Colony Park as an option. Minor styling changes were made, as the grille and the fenders were restyled; to better separate the Continental from the Mark IV, Lincoln reintroduced chrome fender trim. For the first time since 1967, the Continental was equipped with a hood ornament. On the inside, more rear seat legroom was added.

For 1973, the Lincoln Continental was brought into compliance with federal crash regulations as it was fitted with a 5-mph front bumper. While a number of vehicles underwent significant revisions to comply with the regulation, the Continental was able to meet the standard by moving its front bumper several inches forward and fitting it with rubber-tipped impact overriders. The rear bumper was modified in a similar manner, with a 2 1/2 mph rating; in total, the Continental gained nearly 5 inches in length.

As a counterpart to the Continental Town Car, a two-door Continental Town Coupe was introduced. In a similar fashion as the Town Car, the Town Coupe was distinguished by its padded vinyl top.

For 1974, the Lincoln Continental was given a new grille, moving from an egg-crate style to a waterfall design. As part of federal regulations, a 5-mph bumper was added to the rear, leading to a redesign of the rear bumper; the taillamps were moved from inside the bumper to above it.

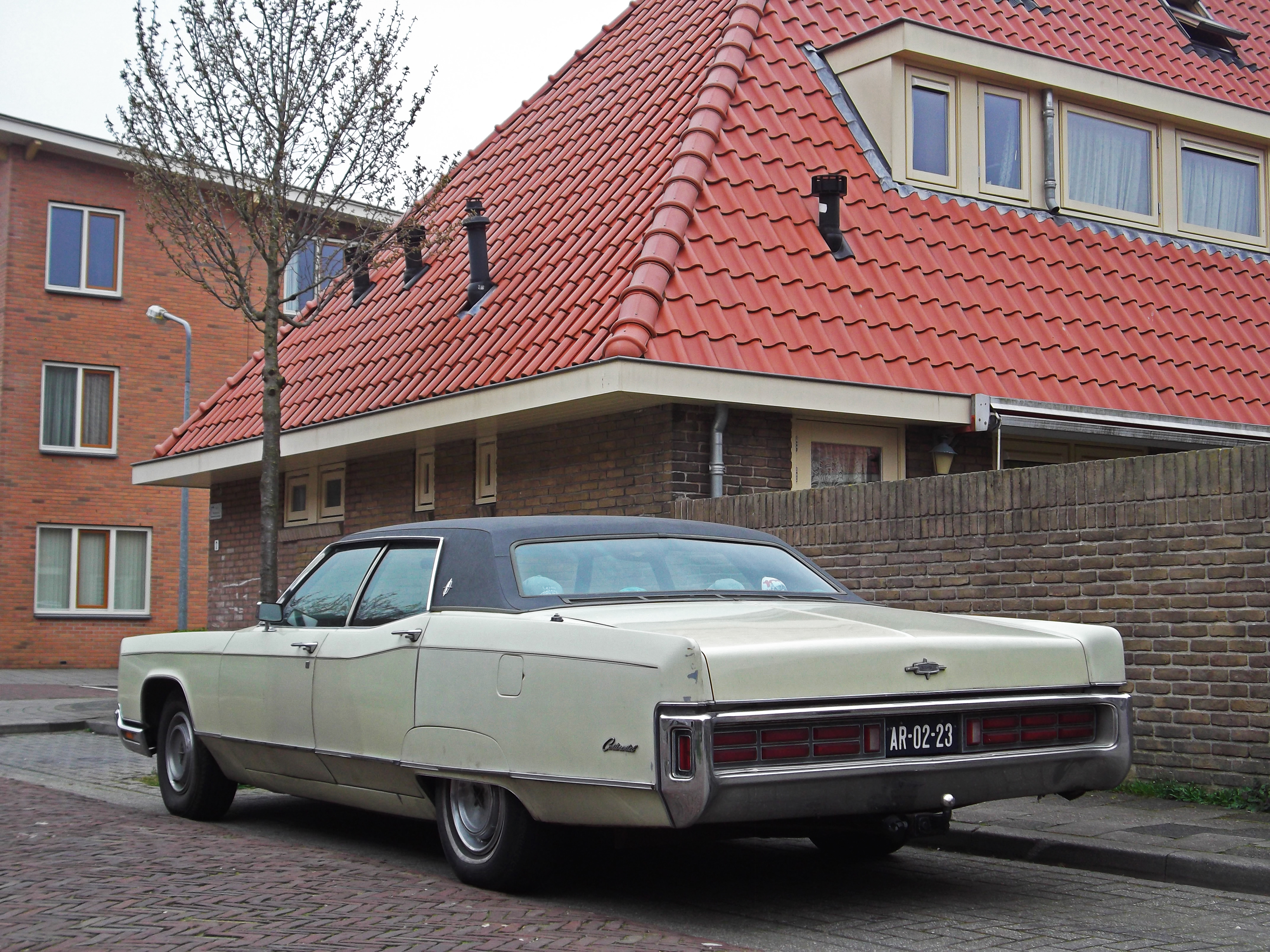
1970 Lincoln Continental, rear view

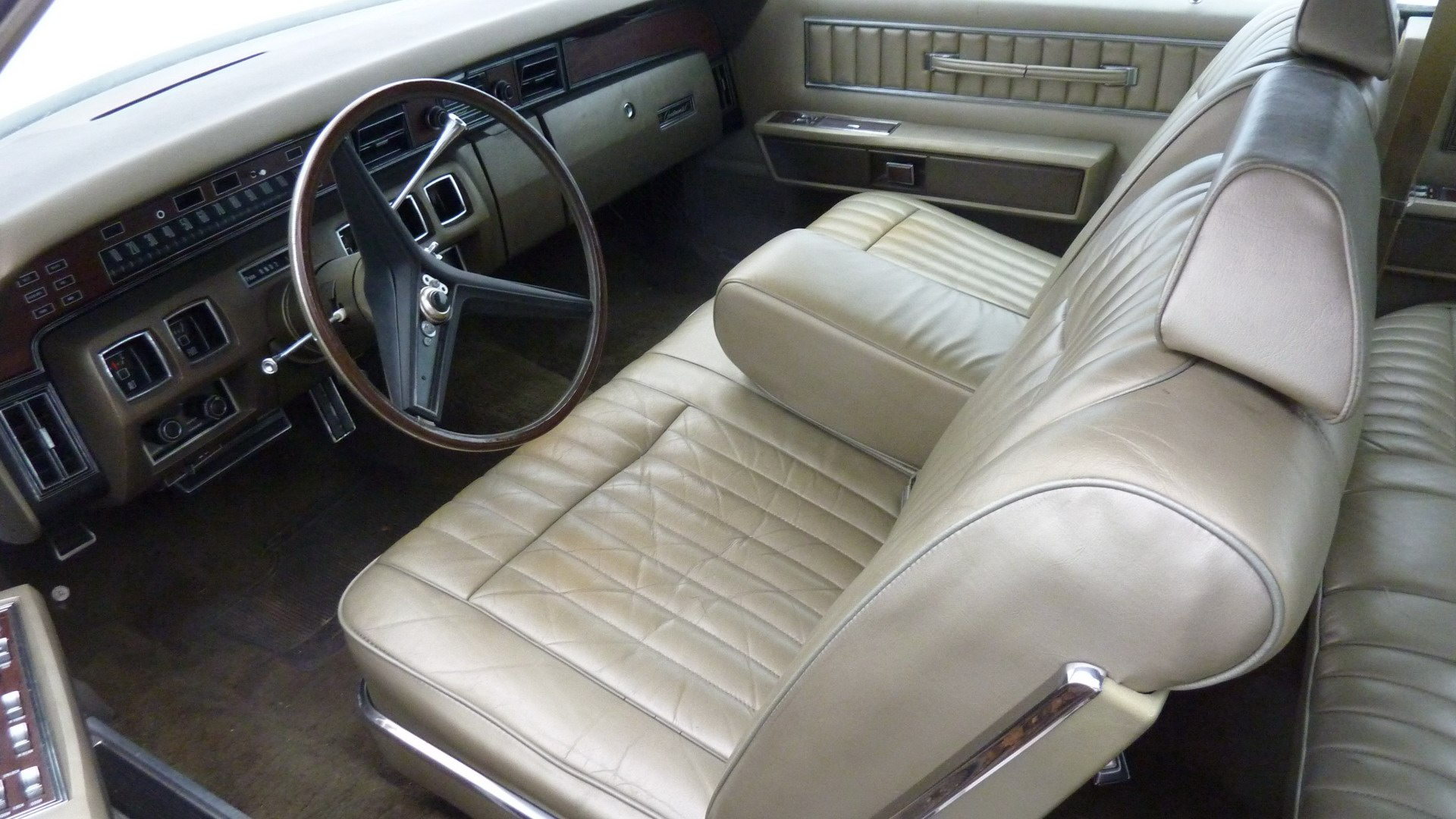
1970 Lincoln Continental Coupé interior

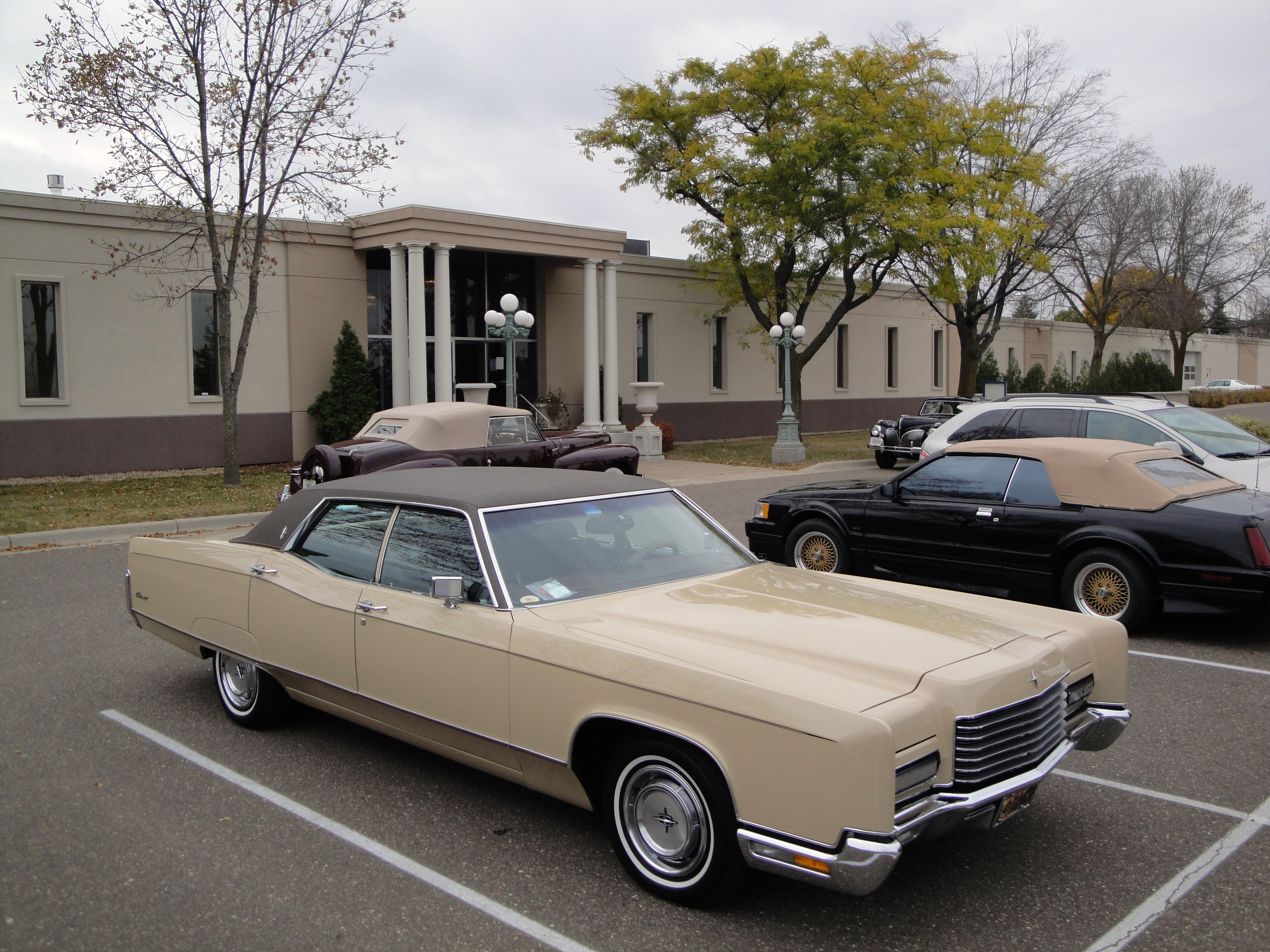
1971 Lincoln Continental Sedan

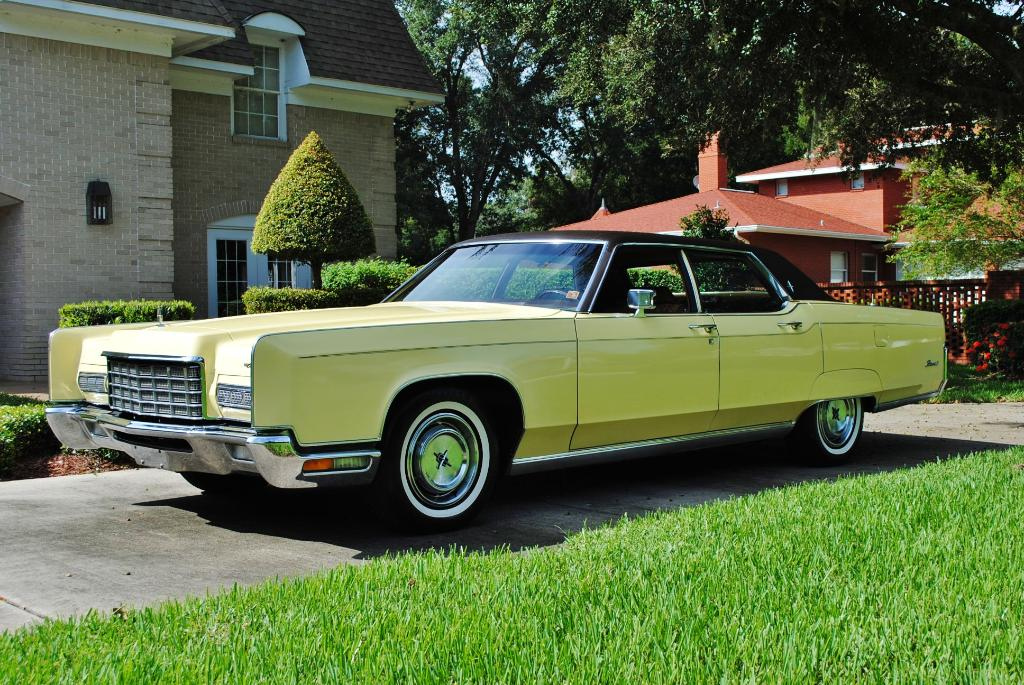
1972 Lincoln Continental

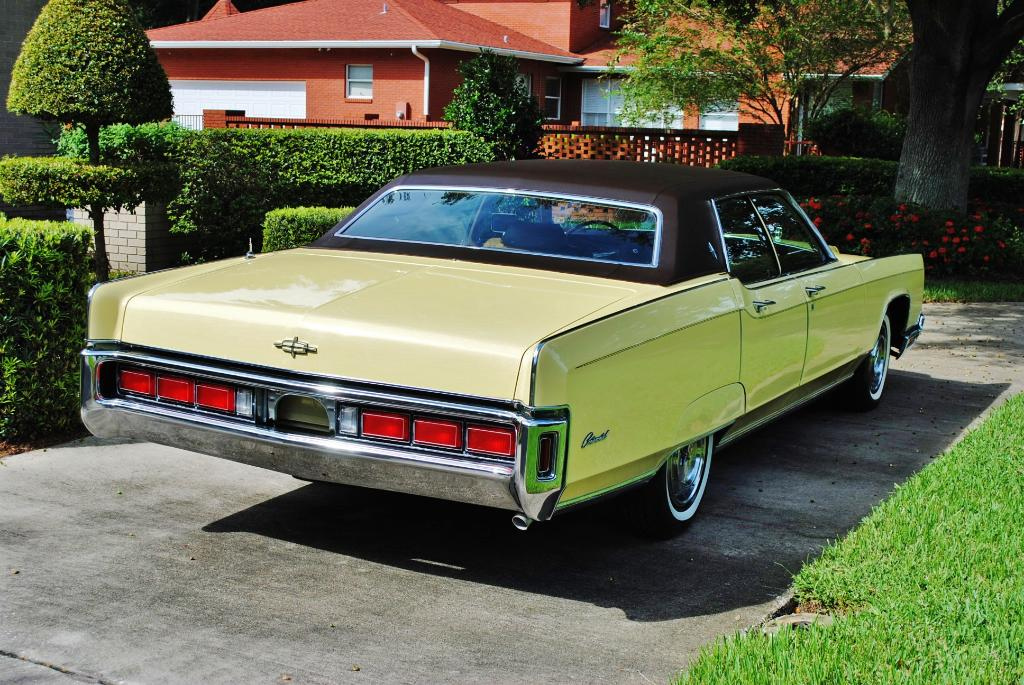
1972 Lincoln Continental, rear view

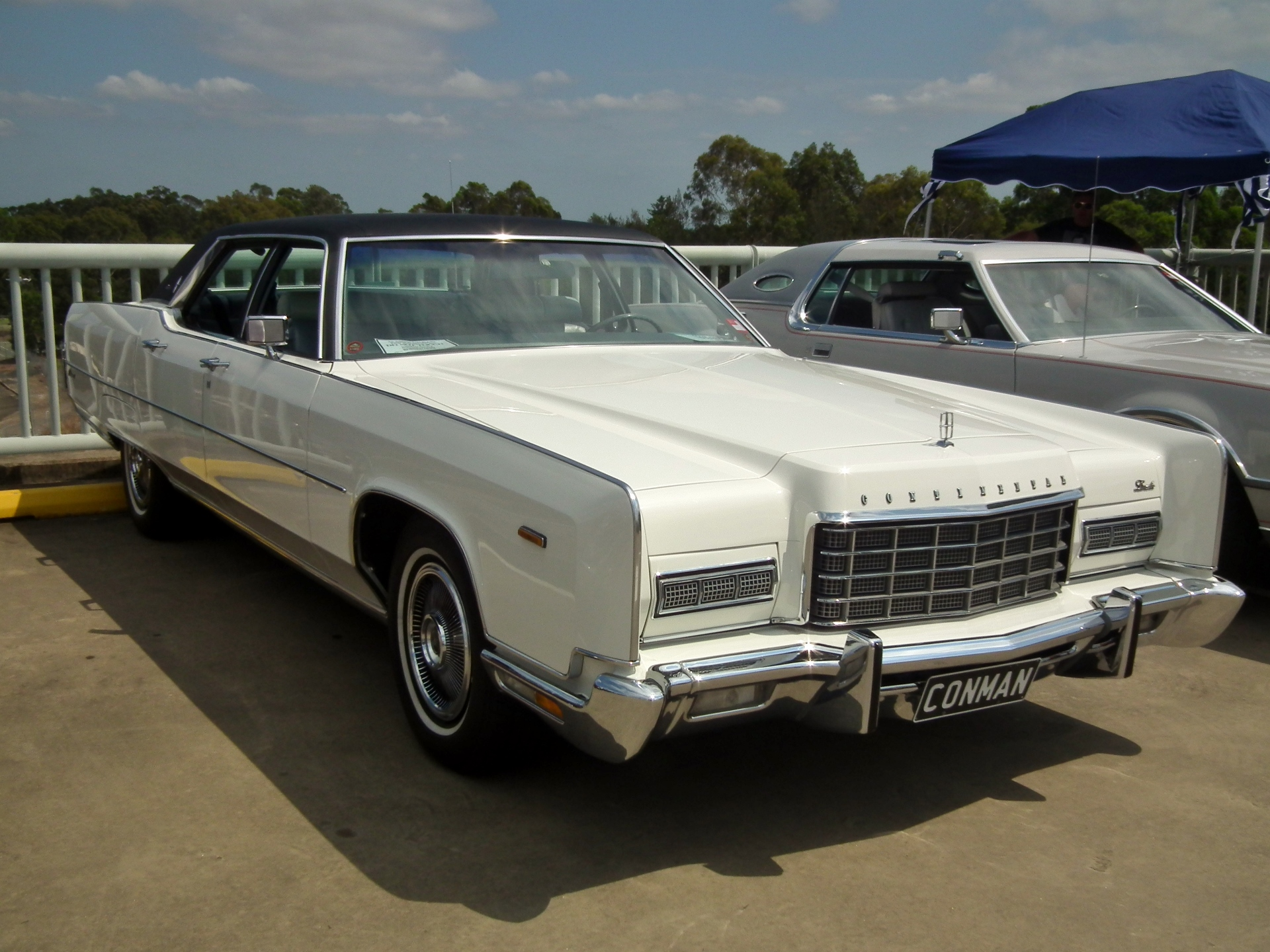
1973 Lincoln Continental Town Car

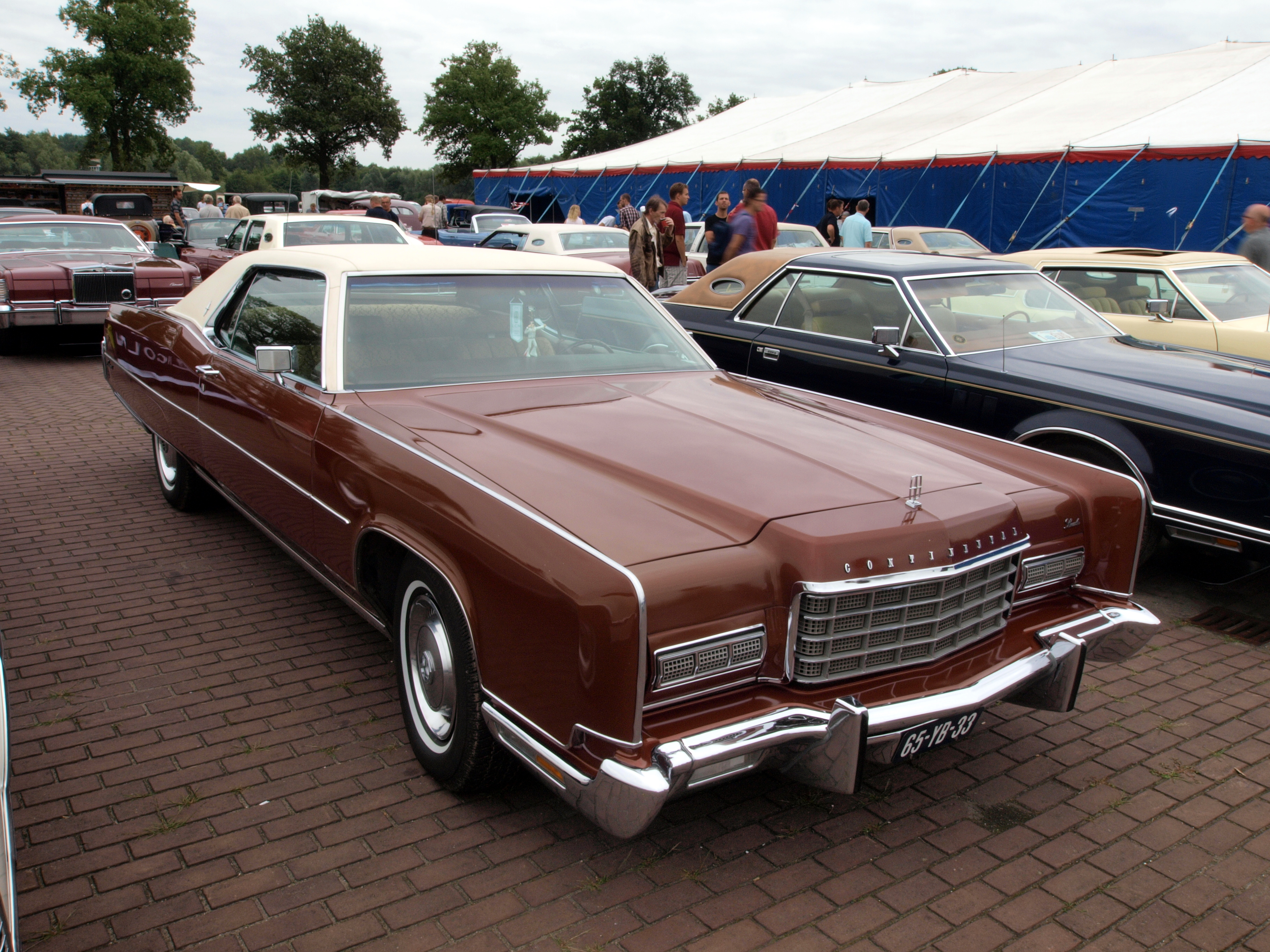
1973 Lincoln Continental Coupé

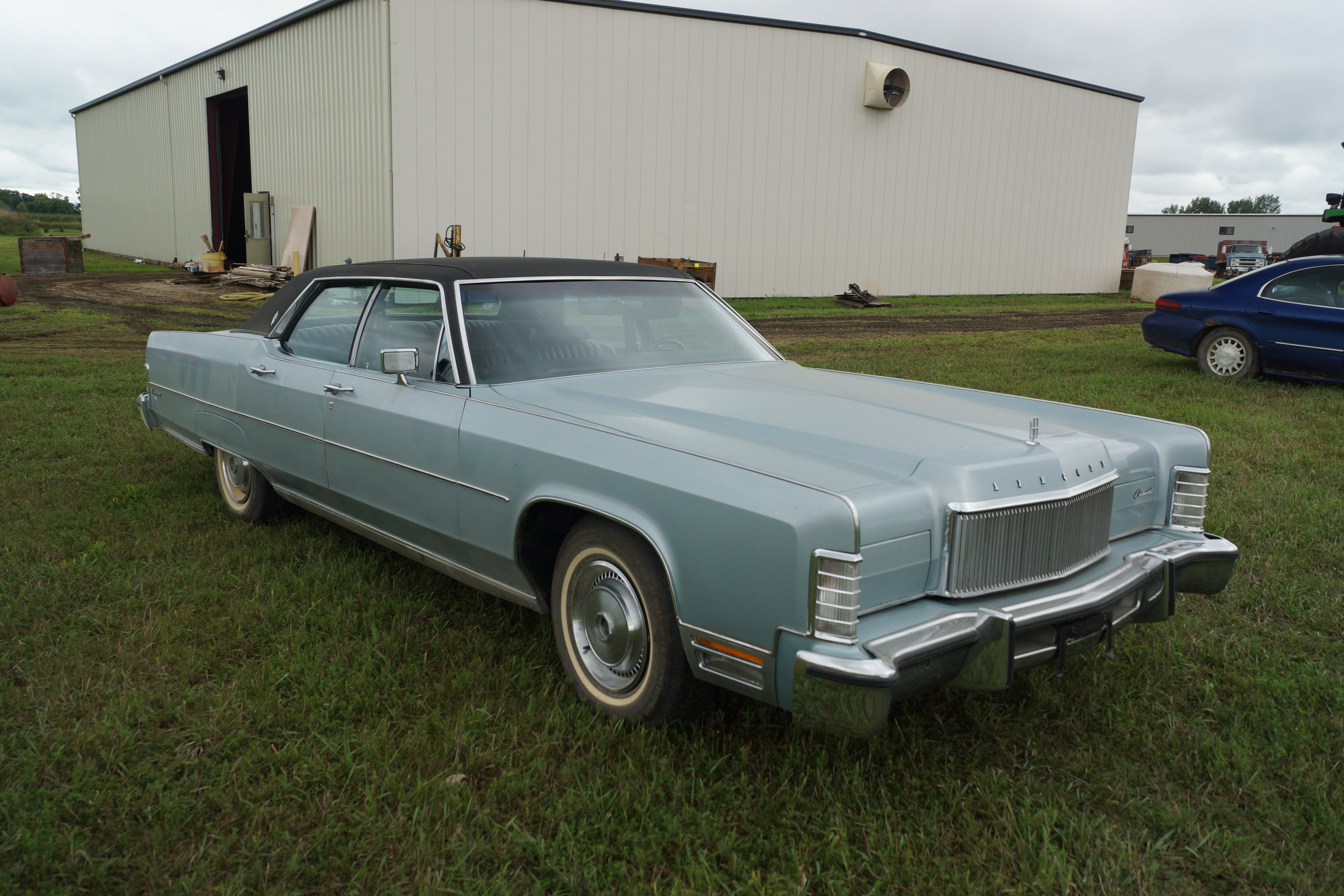
1974 Lincoln Continental Sedan

=== 1975–1979 ===
After 5 years on the market, Lincoln made an extensive revision to the Continental. Coinciding with the 1975 introduction of the Mercury Grand Marquis, Lincoln and Mercury sought to better visually differentiate their two flagship model lines, in spite of their mechanical commonality. As part of the revision, the Lincoln Continental was able to adopt a greater degree of styling commonality with the Continental Mark IV. For 1975, the exterior of the Lincoln Continental underwent a major revision. Although the body below the beltline saw only minor change with the taillights redesigned with vertical units, the roofline was completely restyled. To separate itself from the Mark IV, the two-door Continental/Town Coupe adopted a fully pillared roofline with a square opera window in the C-pillar. In place of the pillared hardtop shared with the Mercury Marquis and Ford LTD, the four-door Continental/Town Car adopted a wide B-pillar; to distinguish itself from the Cadillac Sixty Special Brougham; Town Cars were given the oval opera window introduced on the Mark IV. Along with the styling upgrades, 1975 Lincolns received substantial upgrades to the braking system. Designed by Bendix, the Lincoln Continental became one of the first American cars equipped with a 4-wheel disc brake system (as an option). To further improve the emissions performance of the 460 V8, the engine was fitted with catalytic converters, ending its compatibility with leaded regular gasoline.

For 1976, the exterior remained essentially the same as the year before (marking the first carryover styling year for Lincoln since 1963). In an effort to price the Continental more competitively, Lincoln deleted a number of previously standard features, making them extra cost options.

For 1977, the Lincoln Continental would undergo another exterior revision. The wide Mercury-style grille was replaced by a narrower, Rolls-Royce-style radiator grille, taking cues from the outgoing Mark IV grille. Variations of such grilles would continue to front Lincolns through 1997. In another trim revision, the "Continental" script was removed from the rear fenders.

For 1978, the dashboard was updated for the first time, as the Lincoln Continental adopted a revised version of the Mercury Grand Marquis dashboard. In addition to increasing parts commonality, the update was done to save weight; the plastic-frame Mercury dashboard was lighter than the previous steel-frame version. In a similar move, Lincoln redesigned the rear fender skirts, adopting a version that covered less of the rear wheels. Alongside the optional sliding glass sunroof, a fixed glass moonroof with an interior sunshade was introduced (for the first time since the 1955 Ford Skyliner).

For 1979, the interior underwent further updating, as the Mercury-sourced dashboard received additional wood trim. The 460 V8 was deleted from the Lincoln/ Mark V model line entirely, leaving the 400 V8 as the sole engine.

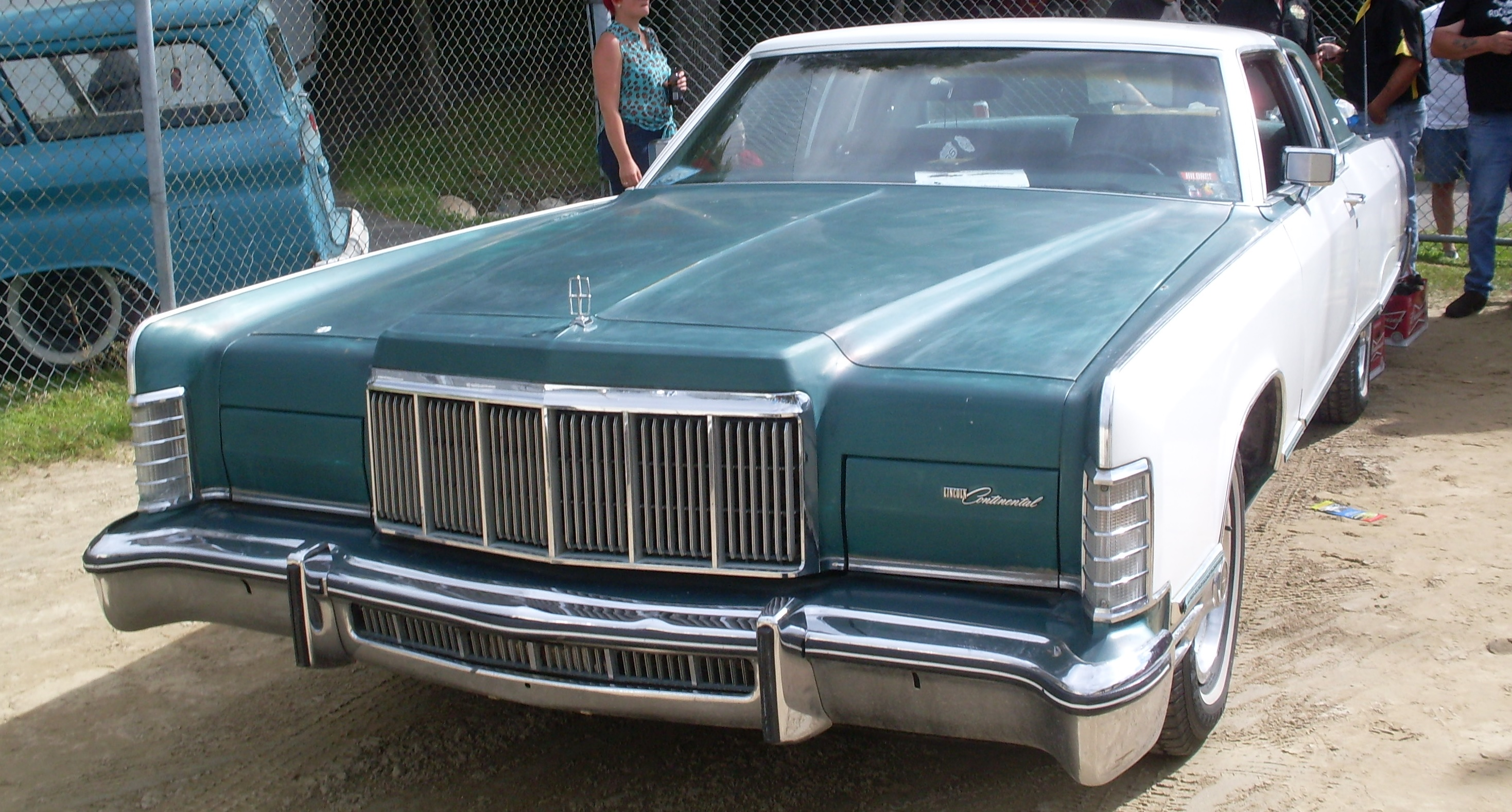
1975 Lincoln Continental Town Coupe

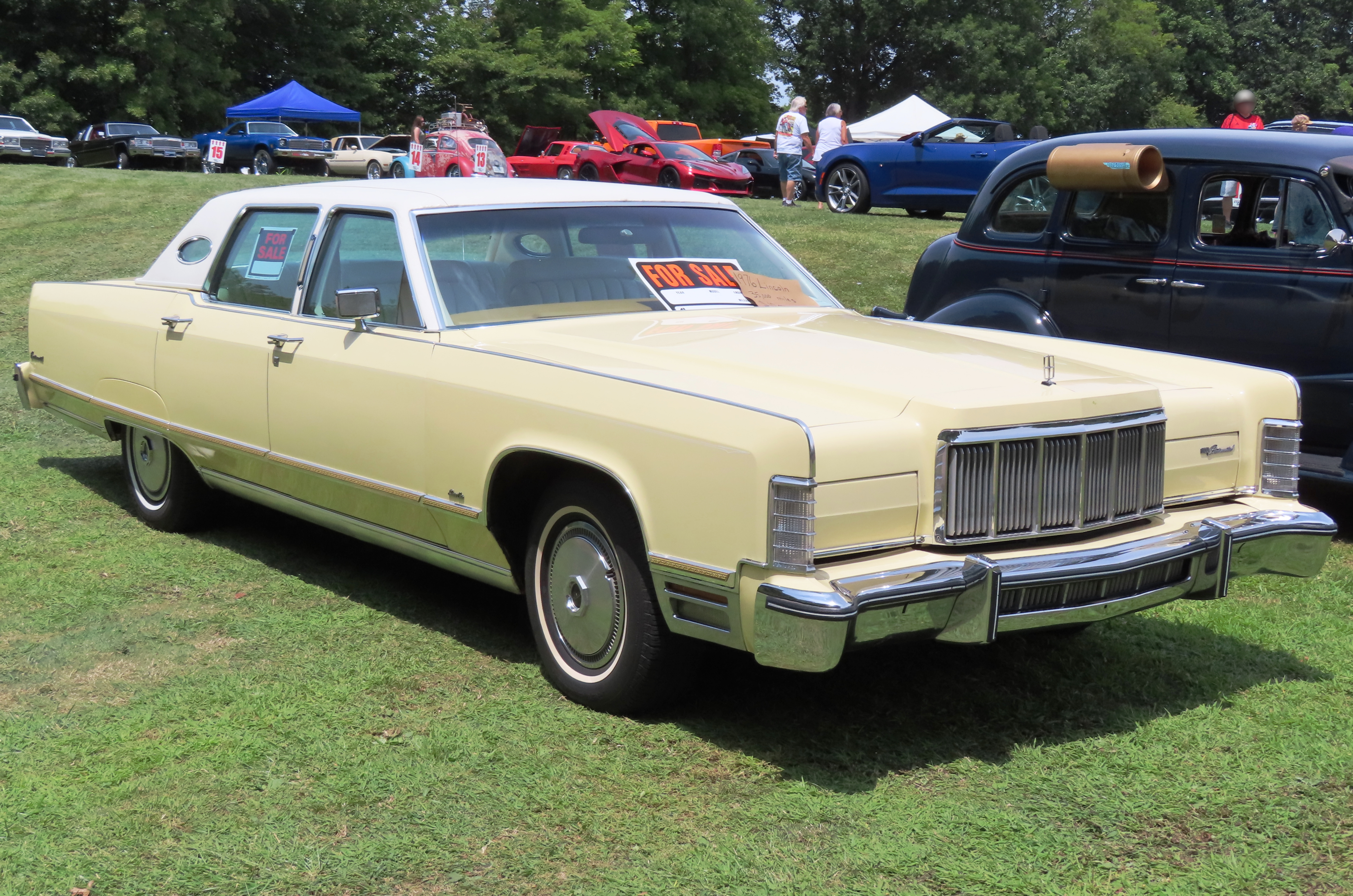
1976 Lincoln Continental Town Car

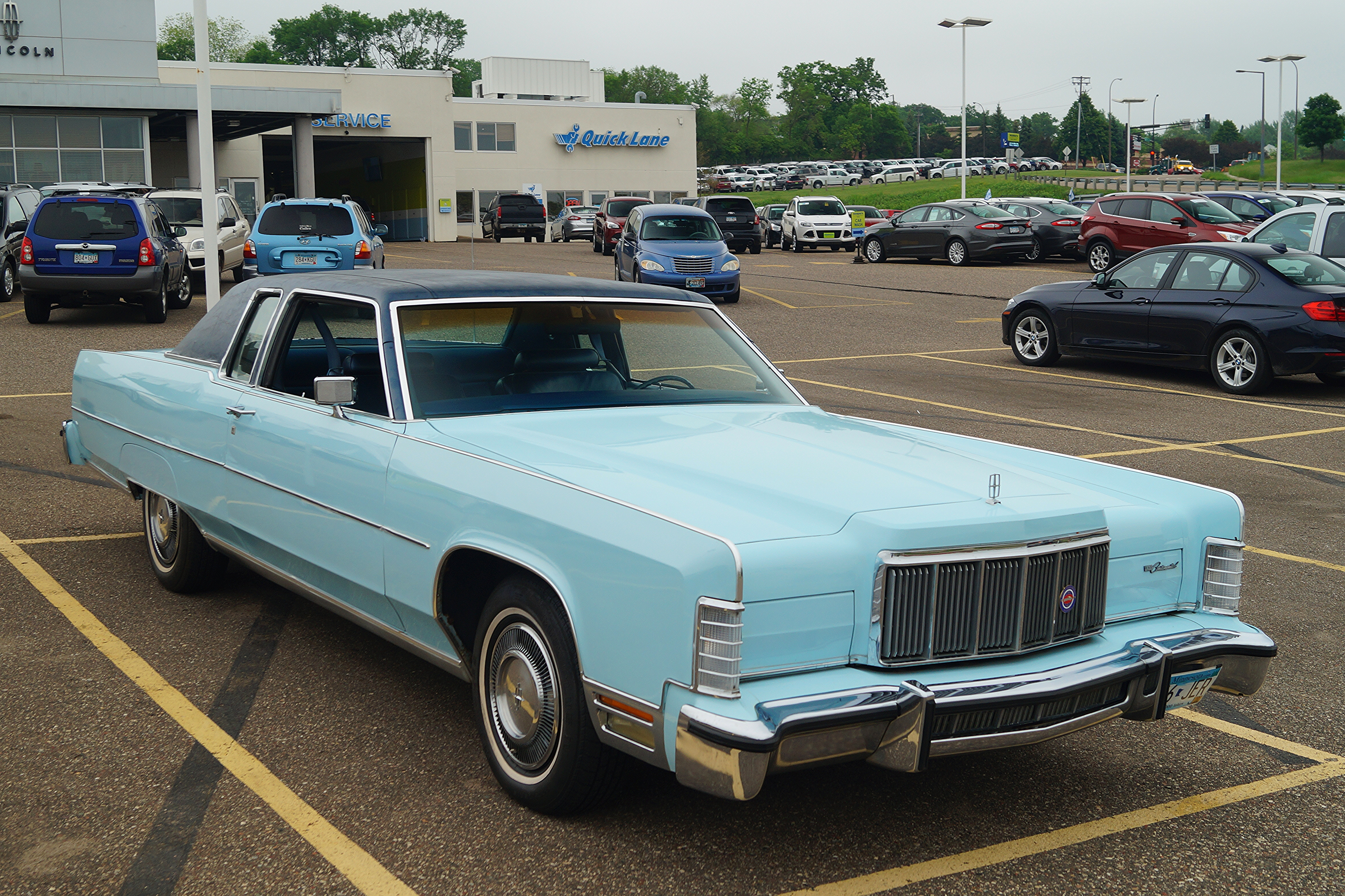
1976 Lincoln Continental Town Coupe

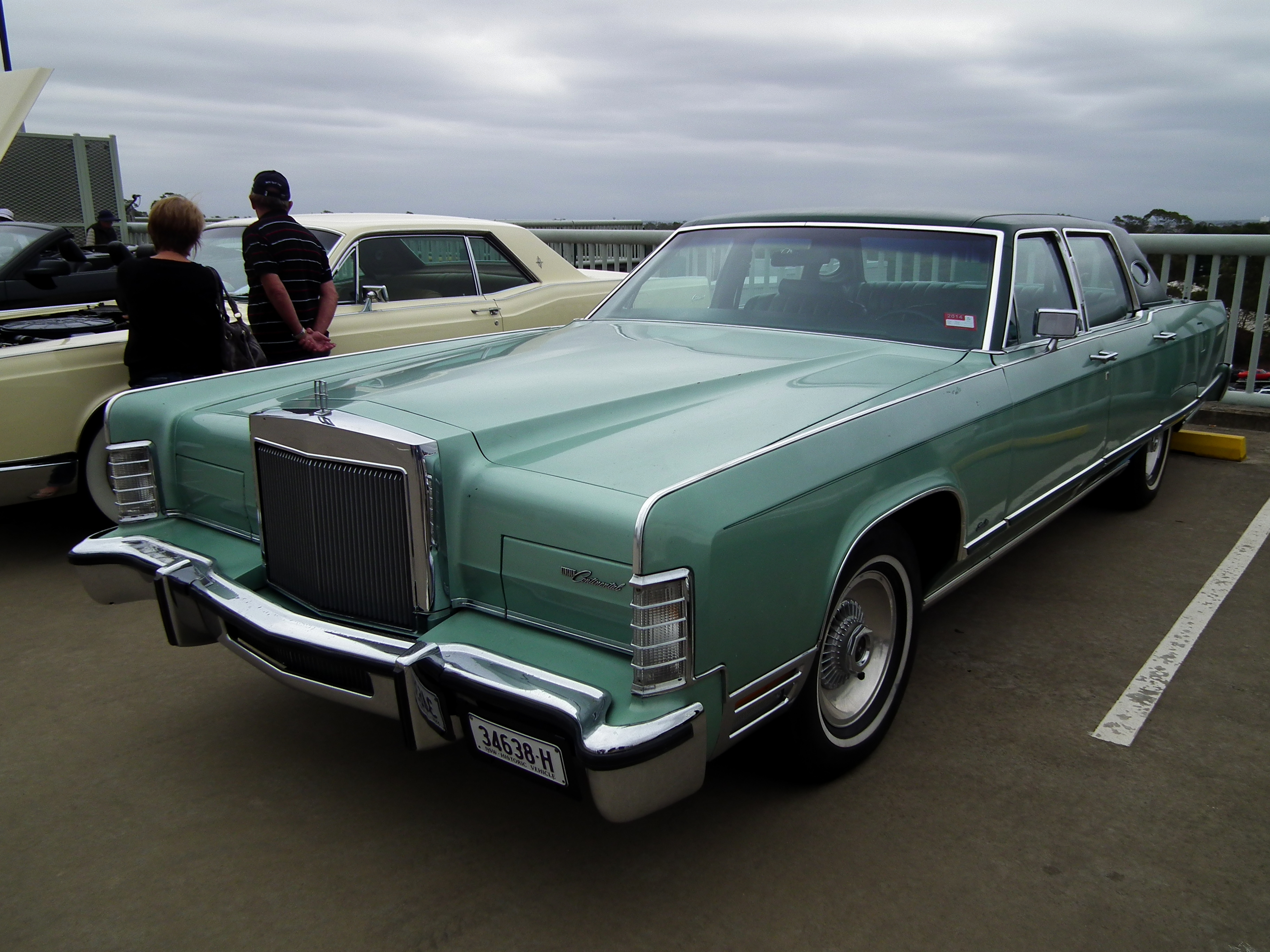
1977 Lincoln Continental Town Car

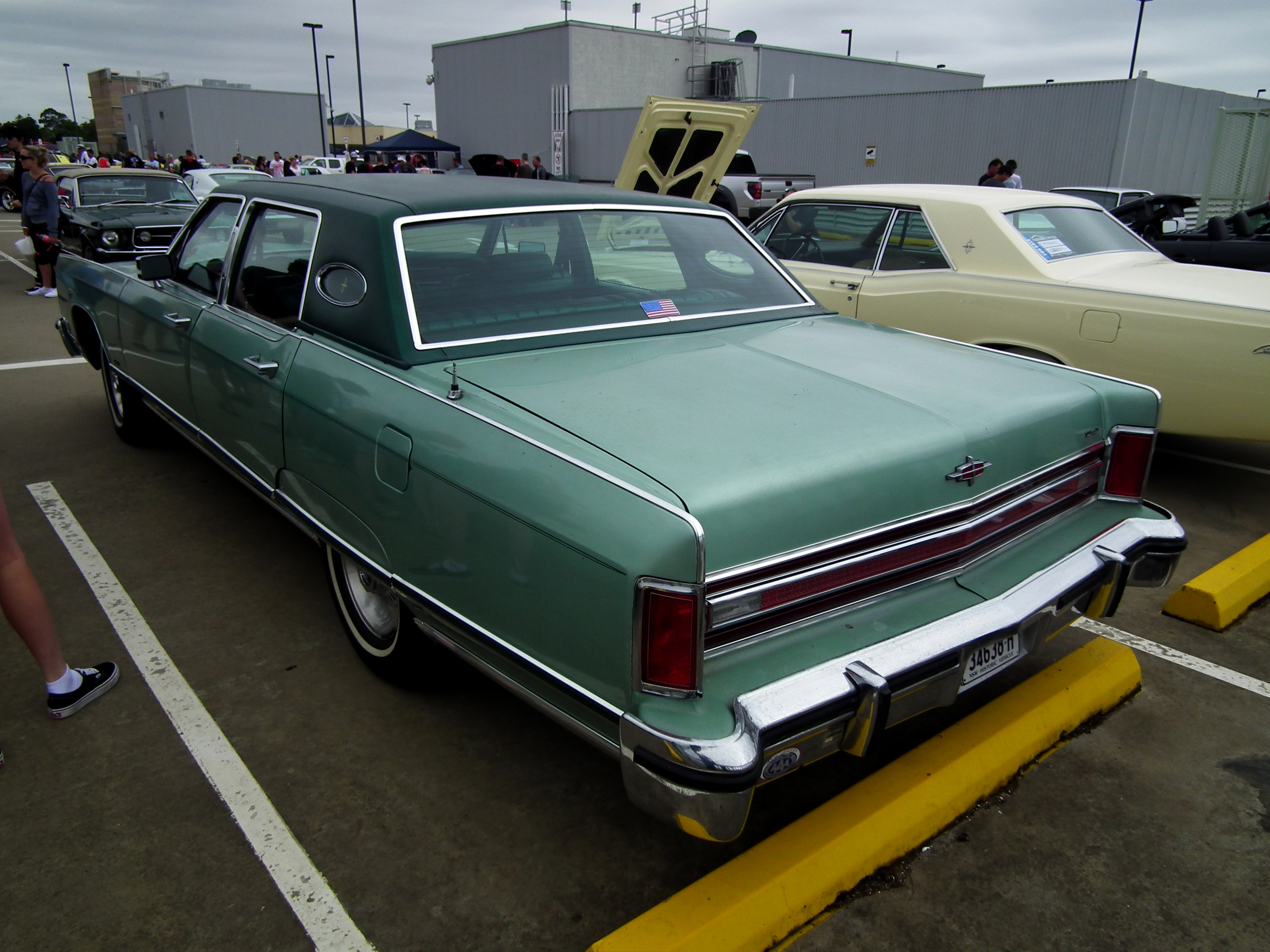
1977 Lincoln Continental Town Car, rear view

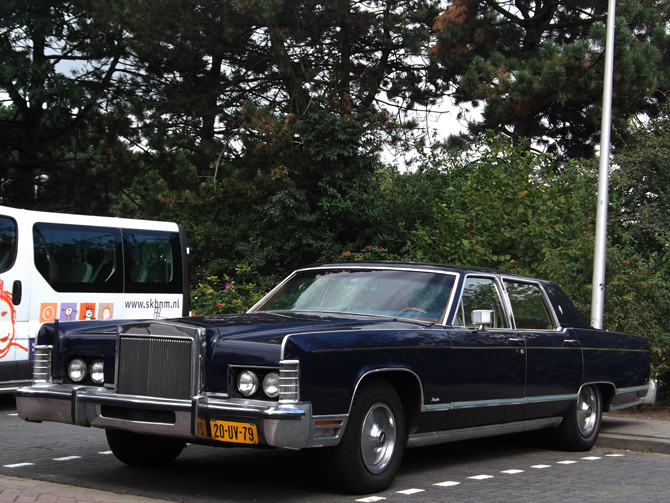
1978 Lincoln Continental (standard trim)

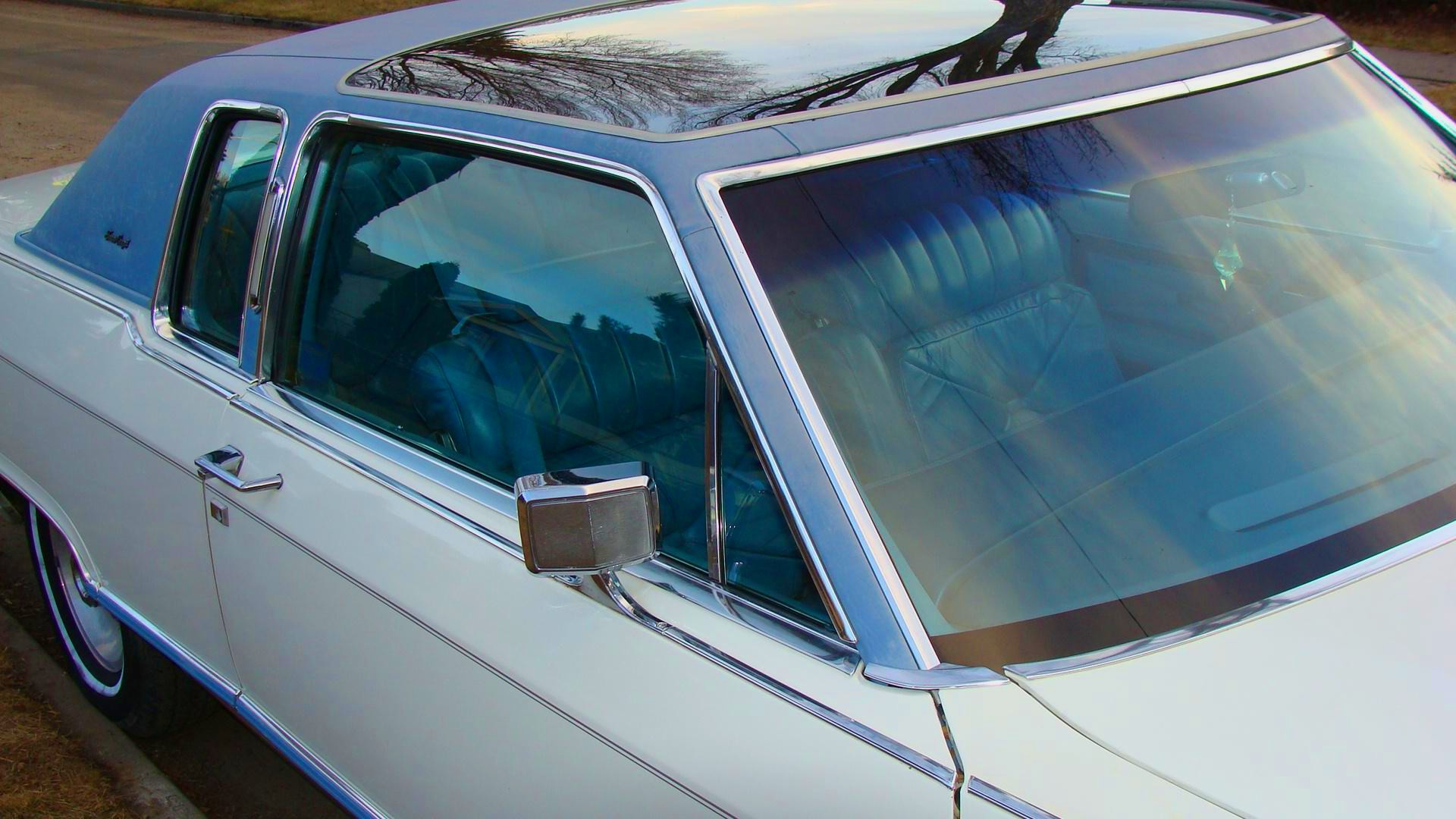
1978 Lincoln Continental Town Coupe, showing glass moonroof

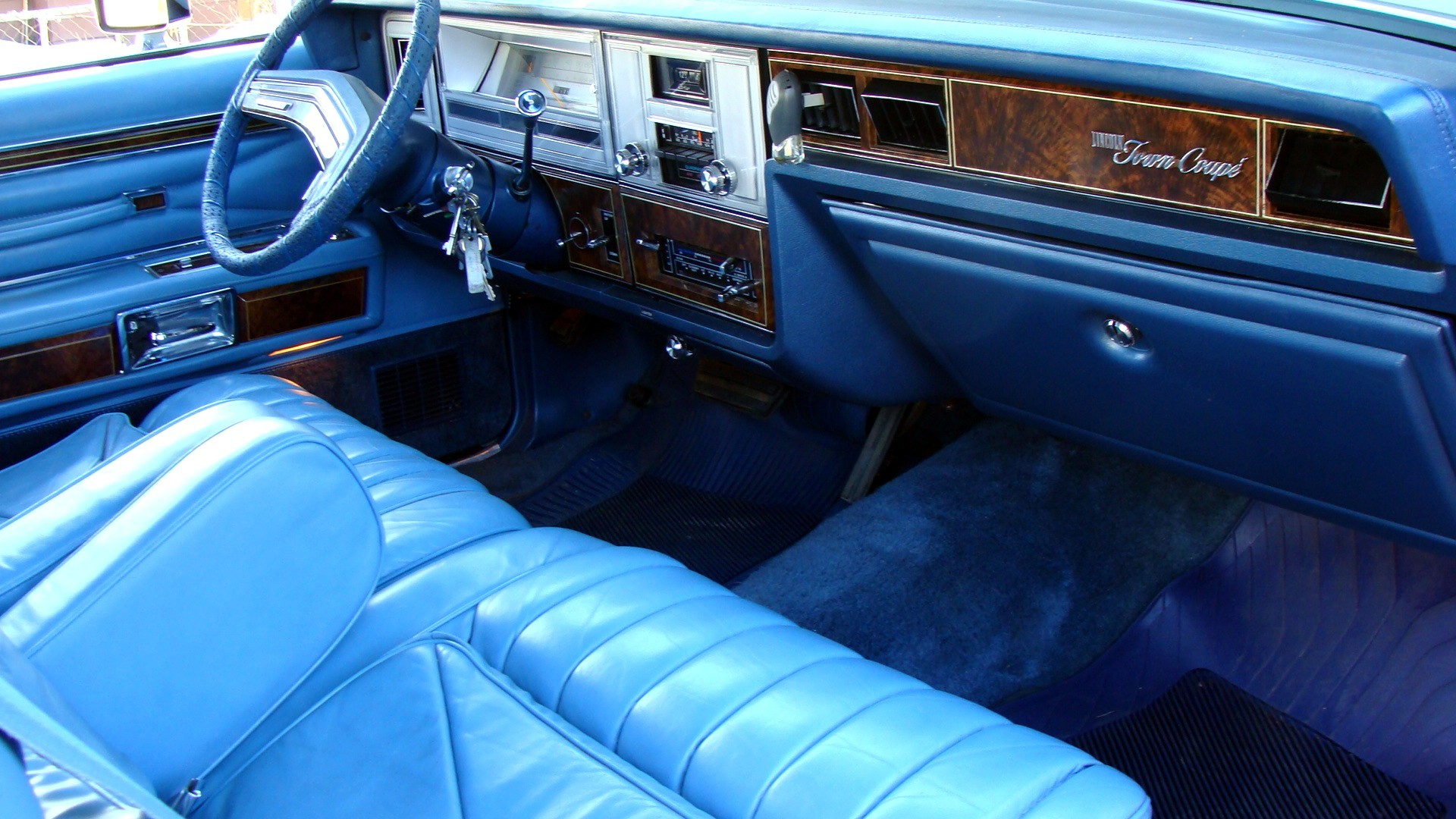
1978 Lincoln Continental Town Coupe interior

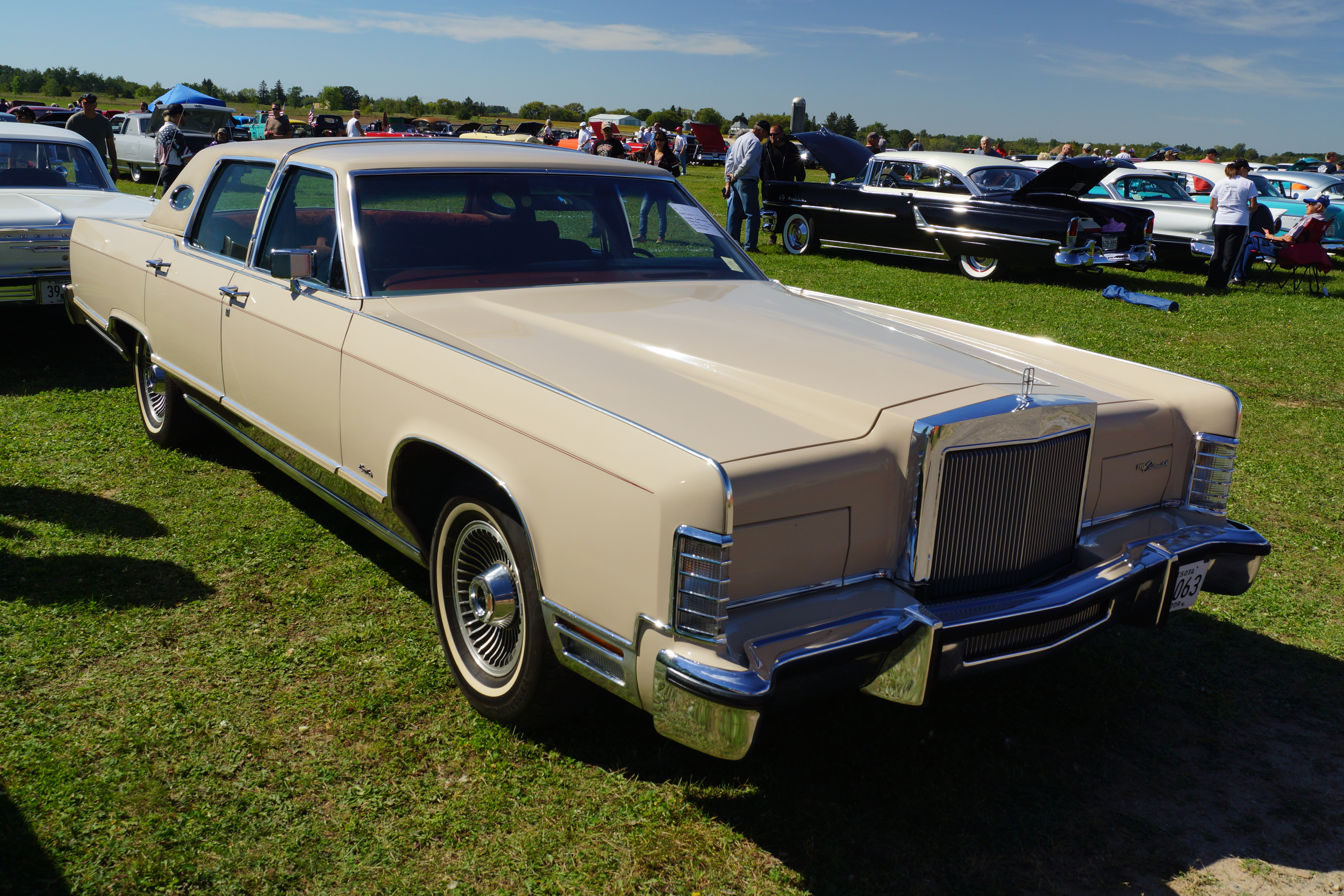
1979 Lincoln Continental Town Car

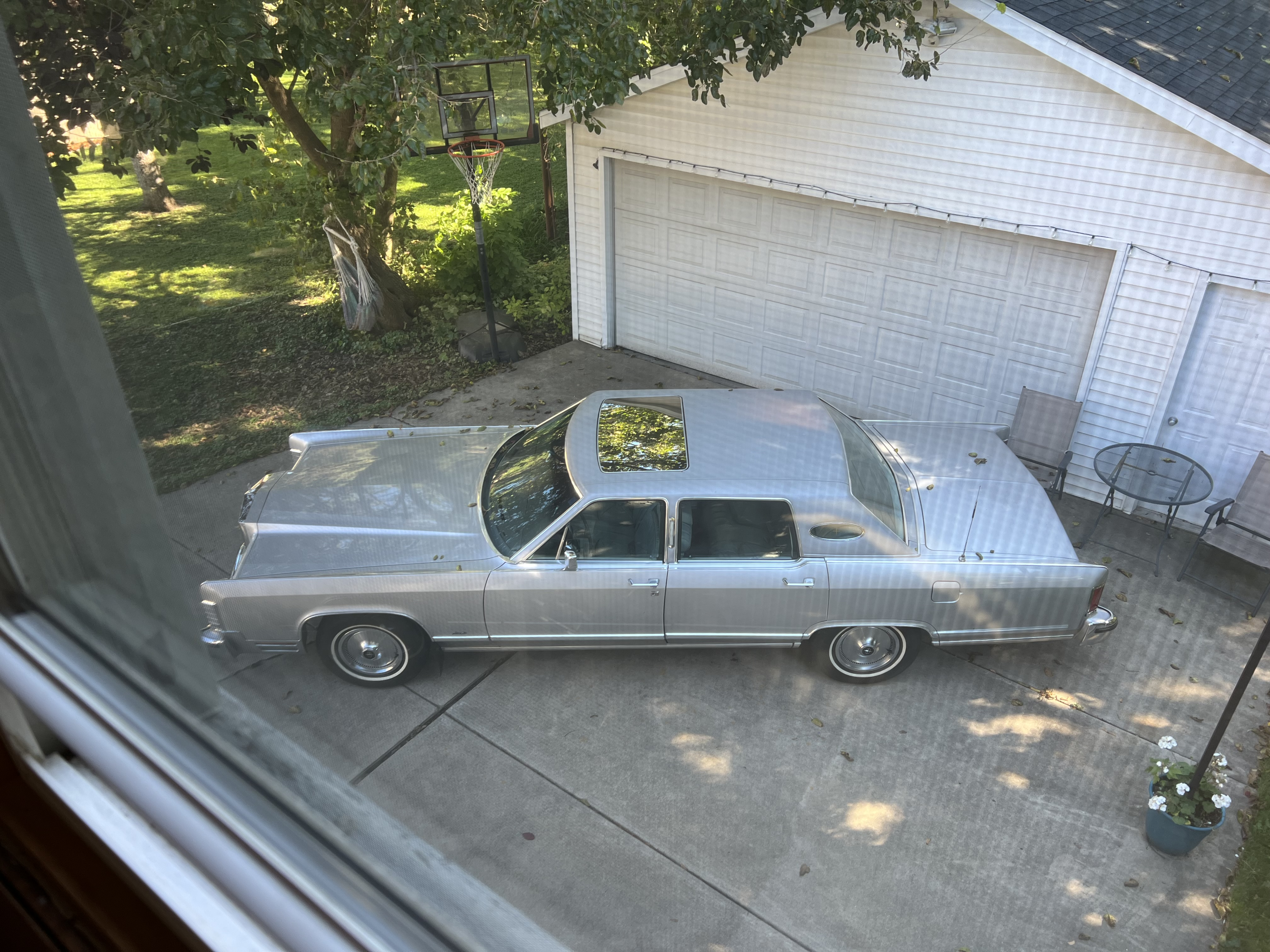
1979 Lincoln Continental Town Car, top view, showing powered, retractable moonroof

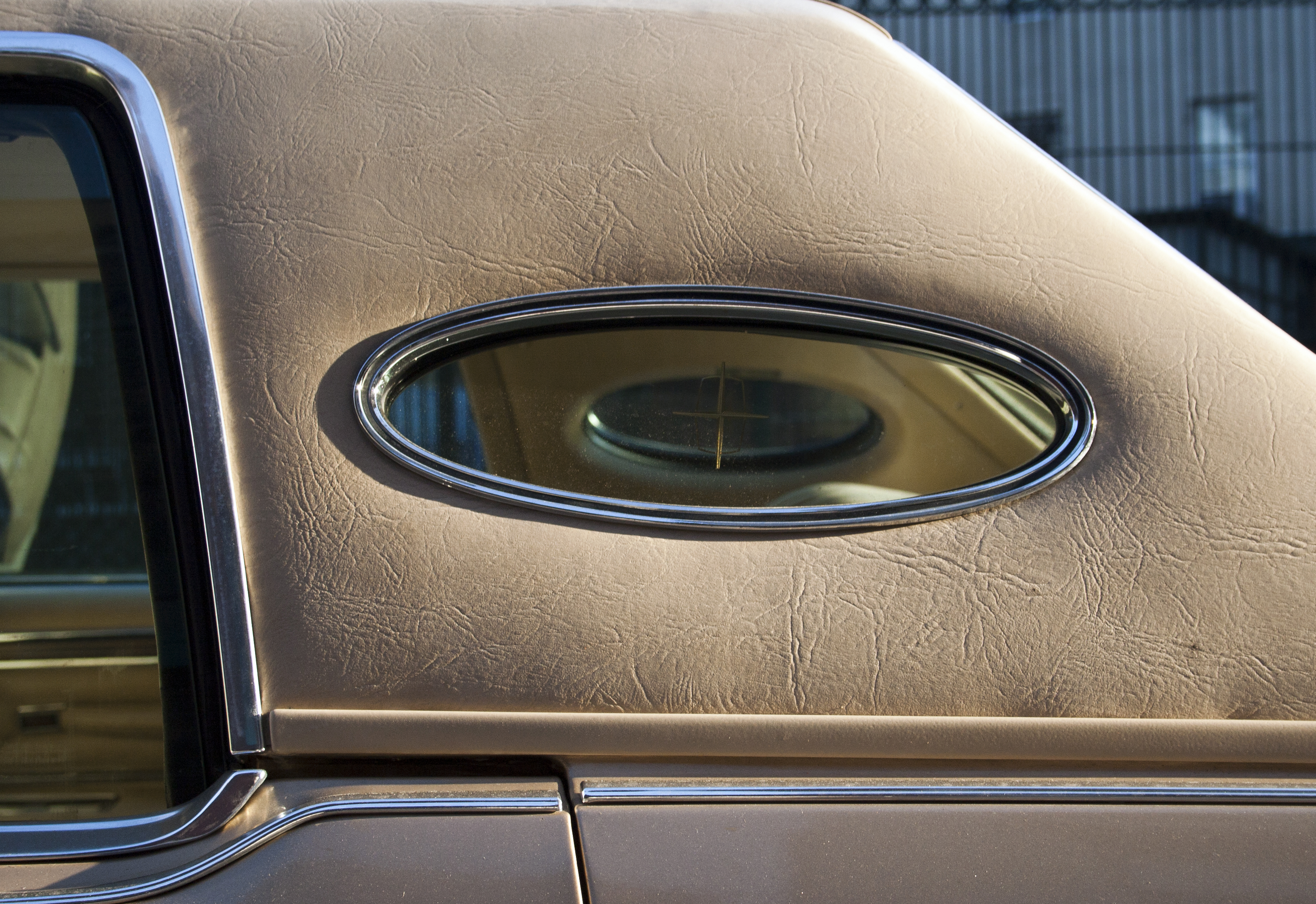
Opera window, 1979 Lincoln Continental Town Car

=== Special editions ===
Throughout its production, the fifth-generation Lincoln Continental was offered with several special-edition option packages. In contrast to the Mark series, the fifth-generation Continental was not offered with any Designer Series editions.

==== Golden Anniversary (1971) ====
To commemorate the 50th anniversary of Lincoln in 1971, a Golden Anniversary Town Car was offered as a limited-edition option package for the Lincoln Continental. Although technically available in any of 25 paint colors available for any Lincoln, the Golden Anniversary Town Car featured an exclusive gold moondust metallic paint color as an option; 1,040 examples were painted in the gold moondust color. All examples were given a color-keyed vinyl roof with a color-keyed leather interior (with trim exclusive to the package).

Other features included a commemorative brochure, a glove compartment vanity mirror, a commemorative plaque on the dashboard, and keys plated in 22-karat gold presented in a jewelry box. In total, 1,575 examples were produced; initial production was 1,500 vehicles, with an additional 75 produced exclusively for employees within Ford Motor Company.

==== Williamsburg Edition (1977–1979) ====
From 1977 to 1979, Lincoln sold a Williamsburg Edition Continental Town Car. Intended as a cosmetic option package, the Williamsburg Edition was the only Continental or Town Car sold with two-tone paint; the edition also standardized a number of options. Along with two-tone paint, the Williamsburg Edition also included a full vinyl roof, pinstriping, power vent windows, lighted vanity mirrors, and 6-way twin "Comfort Lounge Seats".

For 1977, the option package was designed as one of the most conservative versions of the Town Car, without any opera windows or coach lights fitted to the roofline. For 1978 and 1979, the opera windows and coach lights were added to the roofline.

==== Collector's Series (1979) ====
To commemorate the end of production of the Lincoln Continental and Continental Mark V while denoting them as the final "traditional" full-size American sedans and coupes, Lincoln offered a Collector's Series for both the Continental and Mark V. As with its Mark V counterpart, the Continental Collector's Series was equipped with essentially every available feature as standard equipment. Limited options were available for the Collector's Series including: a fixed glass moonroof or a power moonroof, which also required a full-vinyl roof; a 40-channel CB radio; a choice of four-wheel disc brakes with Sure-Track or a 2.75 Traction-Lok rear axle; an illuminated outside thermometer; an engine block heater; a choice of Midnight Blue leather or Kasman II luxury cloth interior. The Continental Collector's Series could reach $19,200. Within Ford Motor Company, it was only surpassed by its Mark V Collector's Series counterpart at the time, which could reach $23,639.

The Continental Collector's Series was produced in four colors: Midnight Blue Metallic, White and limited-issue Diamond Blue Metallic (197 built) and Light Silver Metallic (125 built) with a Midnight Blue Valino grain Coach vinyl roof.

=== Production ===
Lincoln Continental Production Figures
	Coupe	Sedan	Yearly Total
1970	9,073	28,622	37,695
1971	8,205	27,346	35,551
1972	10,408	35,561	45,969
1973	13,348	45,288	58,636
1974	7,318	29,351	36,669
1975	21,185	33,513	54,698
1976	N/A	N/A	68,646
1977	27,440	68,160	95,600
1978	N/A	N/A	88,087
1979	16,142	76,458	92,600

== Sixth generation (1980) ==
Sixth generation
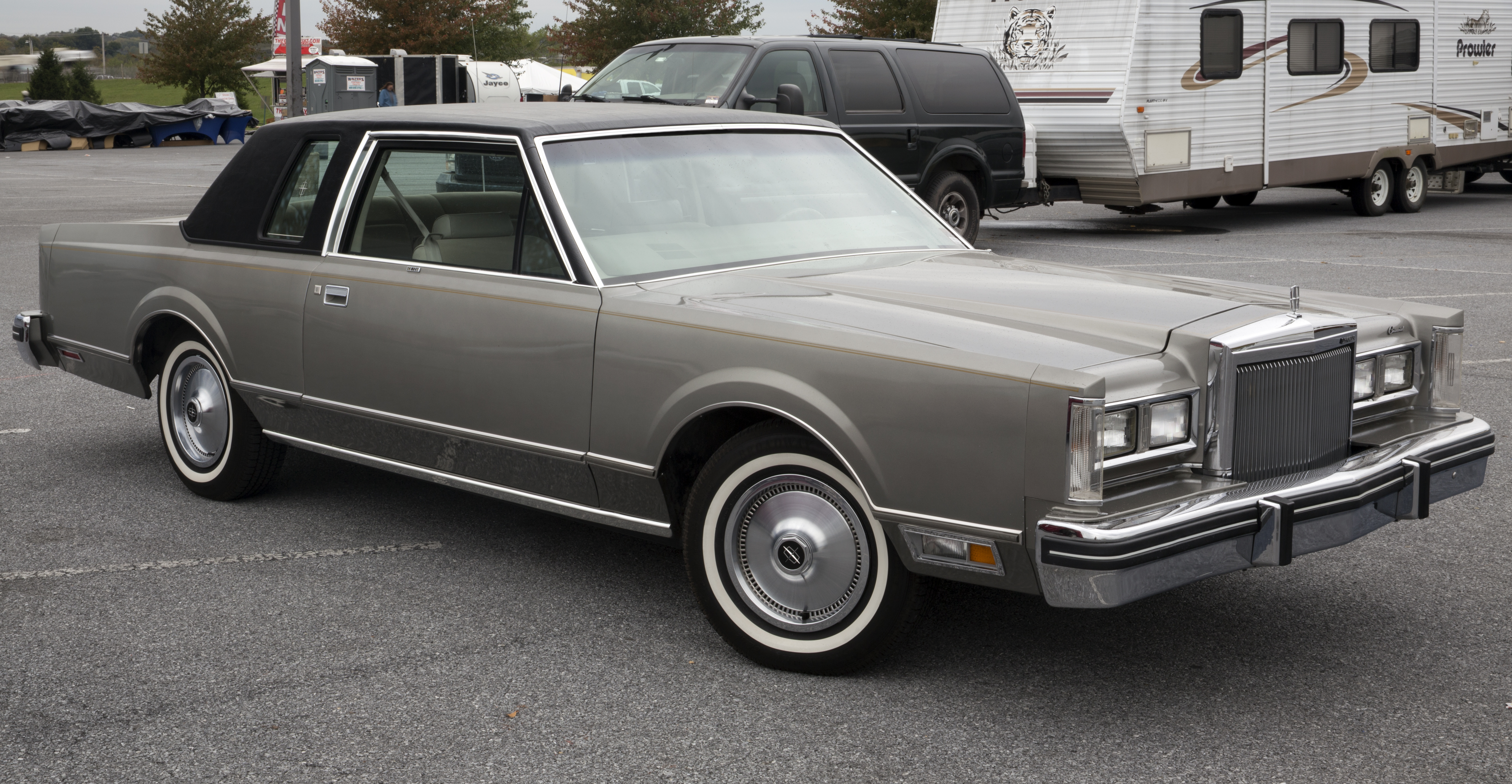
- 1980 Lincoln Continental Town Coupe

Overview
- Manufacturer: Lincoln-Mercury (Ford)
- Also called: Lincoln Continental Town Car/Town Coupe
- Model years: 1980
- Assembly: United States: Wixom, Michigan (Wixom Assembly)

Body and chassis
- Body style: 2-door coupe 4-door sedan
- Layout: FR layout
- Platform: Ford Panther
- Chassis: Body-on-Frame
- Related: Ford LTD Landau; Mercury Grand Marquis

Powertrain
- Engine: 302 cu in (4.95 L) Ford Windsor V8; 351 cu in (5.75 L) Windsor V8
- Transmission: 4-speed AOD automatic

Dimensions
- Wheelbase: 117.4 in (2,982 mm)
- Length: 219.2 in (5,568 mm)
- Width: 78.1 in (1,984 mm)
- Height: 56.1 in (1,425 mm)
- Curb weight: 4,061–4,147 lb (1,842–1,881 kg)

Chronology
- Successor: Lincoln Town Car

With the impending adoption of federal fuel-economy standards (CAFE) making the large cars of the 1970s a potential financial threat to Ford Motor Company, for 1979, Ford and Mercury full-size sedans underwent extensive downsizing; Lincoln became the final American brand to move to a downsized model range for the 1980 model year. In another extensive model change, the Lincoln Continental became the counterpart of the newly introduced Continental Mark VI, the first Mark series model range smaller than its predecessor.

While lagging behind Cadillac for three years to downsize its model range, the redesign of the Continental provided Lincoln with the best year-to-year fuel economy improvement (38%) in Ford history. Alongside a massive reduction of curb weight, the introduction of a 4-speed overdrive transmission enabled Lincoln to surpass its competitors, switching from the brand with the worst 1979 CAFE rating to the most fuel-efficient full-size car sold.

One of the most technologically advanced vehicles ever sold by Ford at the time, the 1980 Continental introduced a standard 4-speed automatic overdrive transmission, electronic fuel injection with computer-controlled engine management (EEC-III), digital instrument panel, and trip computer (measuring real-time and average fuel economy figures and driving range). Throughout the decade, many of the features would make their way into many other Ford and Lincoln-Mercury vehicles.

The sixth generation of the Lincoln Continental would be offered only for 1980. To eliminate saturation of the Lincoln model line, the sixth-generation Continental was re-released as the Lincoln Town Car for 1981 (effectively lasting through the 1989 model year). Following the 1980 withdrawal of the Versailles and the introduction of the Town Car, the Continental nameplate was shifted to the mid-size segment for the 1982 model year (skipping the 1981 model year). While never officially announced as the replacement for the Versailles, the 1982 Continental became the Lincoln competitor for the Cadillac Seville. The Mark VI ended its model run after the 1983 model year and was replaced by the Mark VII, a far different vehicle.

=== Chassis ===
Central to the redesign was the adoption of the all-new Ford Panther platform, shared with the Ford LTD and Mercury Marquis. While retaining the body-on-frame layout of its predecessor and using a rear-wheel drive powertrain, the Panther platform made major engineering changes to lower curb weight. In addition, the chassis itself was smaller in several key dimensions. While only approximately 2 inches narrower, the 1980 Continental shed 10 inches of its wheelbase and 14 inches in length. In losing nearly 1000 pounds of curb weight, the 1980 Continental came within 200 pounds of the curb weight of the "compact" Lincoln Versailles.

In its focus on fuel economy, the Panther platform was developed without the use of the 400 or 460 V8s powering full-size Lincoln-Mercurys throughout the 1970s. In their place was the first fuel-injected V8 engine produced by Ford Motor Company. Based on the 302 cubic-inch small block V8, the newly christened 129 hp 5.0L V8 (rounded up from its true 4.9L displacement) was the first "metric-displacement" American Ford engine. As an option, a 140 hp carbureted 351 cubic-inch Windsor V8 was available. In place of the C6 3-speed automatic transmission was an all-new 4-speed Automatic Overdrive Transmission (AOD). Developed under the name Ford Integral Overdrive (FIOD), this industry-first transmission featured both a mechanically engaged overdrive (0.67/1 ratio) fourth gear and third and fourth-gear torque converter lock-up.

The new Panther platform allowed for changes in the new Continental's suspension geometry and many improvements were made to the power steering. With this, and the reduced overall size, the 1980 Lincoln Continental was able to retain the traditional big car ride and feel, while offering a major enhancement to its handling. Compared to the 1980 Continental's GM and Chrysler counterparts and the 1979 Lincoln models, the new car offered more agile maneuvering, as well as a reduced turn diameter by over 8 feet (compared to the 1979 Lincoln Continental).

=== Body ===
Although sharing a common platform and powertrain with the Ford LTD and Mercury Marquis, the Lincoln Continental was well differentiated from its counterparts; no visible body panels were common between the three vehicles. In contrast, the 1980 Continental was positioned as the base model of the Lincoln model line; the Continental Town Car/Town Coupe made its return as the top-trim model. As all Continentals wore padded roofs, Continental Town Cars were largely differentiated by two-tone paint. Lincolns were differentiated from Continental Mark VIs by their exposed headlights and full-width taillamps (instead of a "Continental spare tire trunk"). Two-door Lincolns can be distinguished from Mark VI two-doors with their "notchback" roofline; they share a common wheelbase with four-door Lincolns.

=== Production ===
Lincoln Continental Production Figures
	Coupe	Sedan	Yearly Total
1980	7,177	24,056	31,233

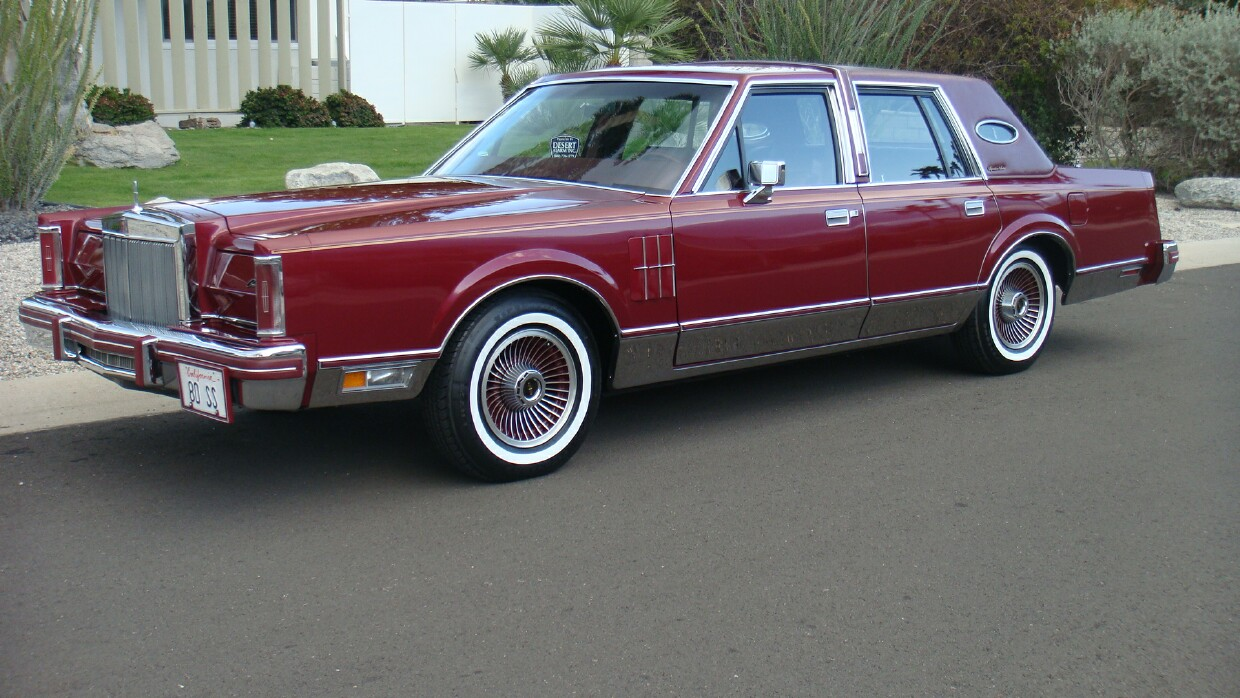
1980 Continental Mark VI Sedan

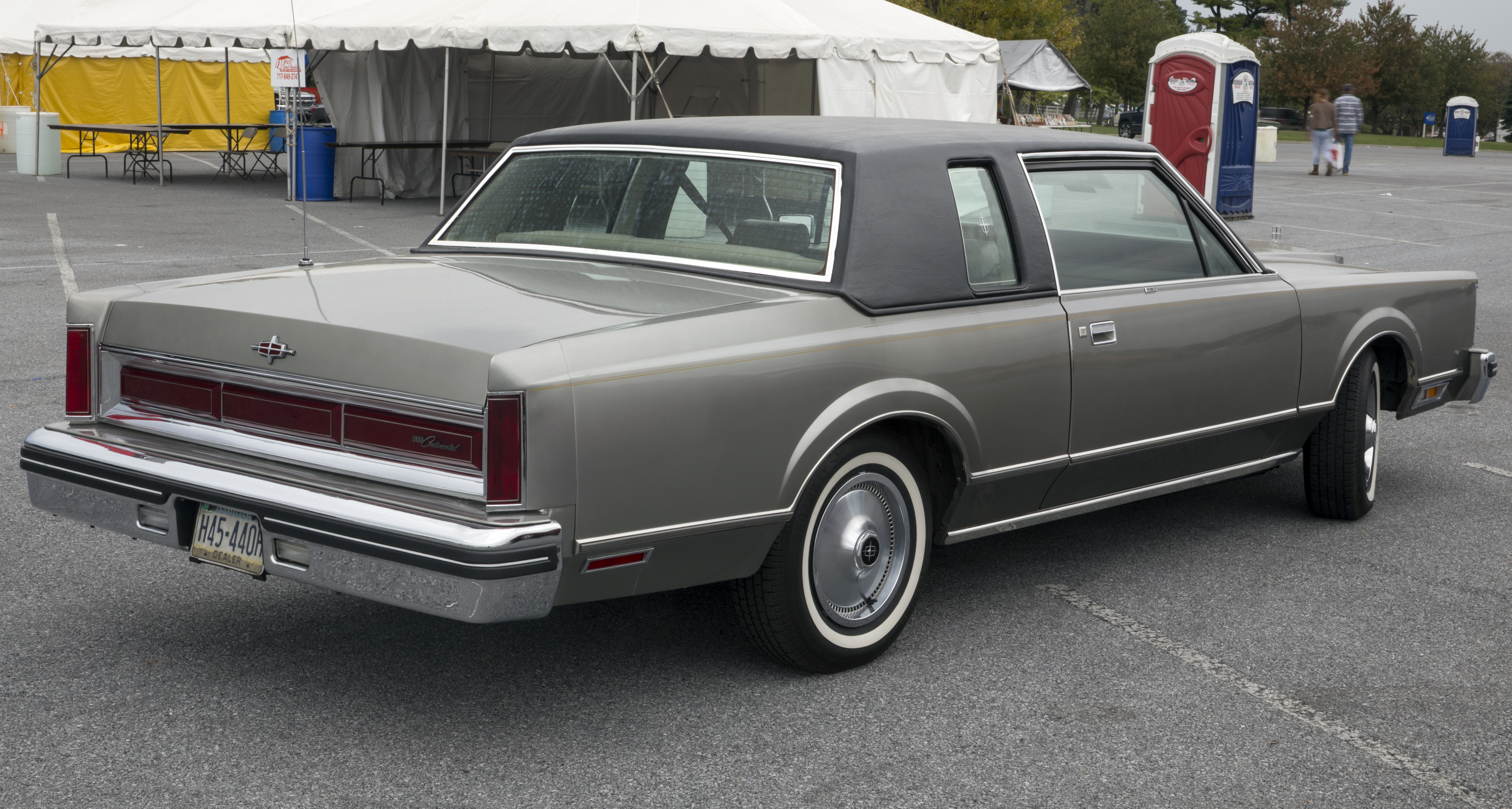
1980 Lincoln Continental Town Coupe rear

== Seventh generation (1982–1987) ==
Seventh generation
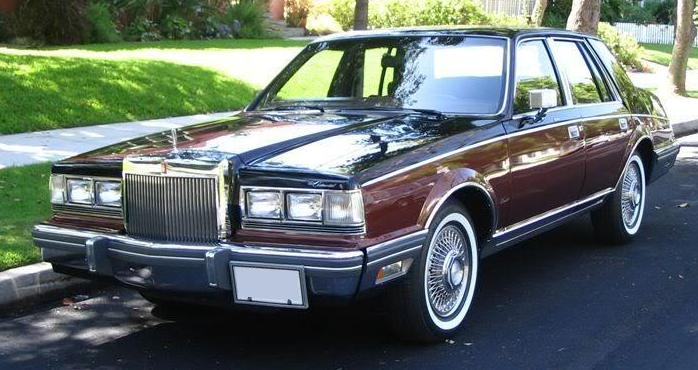
- 1982 Lincoln Continental Givenchy Edition

Overview
- Model years: 1982–1987
- Assembly: United States: Wixom, Michigan (Wixom Assembly)

Body and chassis
- Body style: 4-door sedan
- Layout: FR layout
- Platform: Ford Fox platform
- Related: Lincoln Mark VII; Ford Thunderbird (1980–1982); Mercury Cougar XR7 (1980–1982)

Powertrain
- Engine: 2.4 L (149 cu in) BMW M21 turbodiesel I6; 3.8 L (232 cu in) Essex V6; 4.9 L (302 cu in) 5.0 small block V8
- Transmission: 4-speed AOD automatic 4-speed ZF 4HP22 automatic (turbodiesel)

Dimensions
- Wheelbase: 108.5–108.7 in (2,756–2,761 mm)
- Length: 200.7–201.2 in (5,098–5,110 mm)
- Width: 73.6 in (1,869 mm)
- Height: 55.0 in (1,397 mm)
- Curb weight: 3,384–3,706 lb (1,535–1,681 kg)

Chronology
- Predecessor: Lincoln Versailles

Lincoln entered the 1980 model year facing a critical issue regarding the competitiveness of its brand. Though the introduction of the Continental and Mark VI both placed Lincoln in compliance with CAFE regulations and delivered the division an all-new model line, after the discontinuation of the Lincoln Versailles in early 1980, the Lincoln line now consisted of two full-size sedans that were functionally identical to each other. Though the premium Mark VI was fitted with different interior trim, it offered little visual differentiation over the Continental beyond its hidden headlamps, oval opera windows, and rear bodywork (featuring the "spare tire" trunklid of the Mark series).

For 1981, Lincoln responded by rebranding its full-size sedans under the Town Car name (the Mark VI ended its model cycle after 1983). The Continental returned in October 1981 for 1982, becoming a mid-size competitor for the Cadillac Seville. The smaller line was not intended to replace the Versailles directly (as late as 1980, a second-generation Versailles remained in development by Ford), though the new Continental would adopt a similar exterior footprint. Sold exclusively as a four-door sedan, it was marketed alongside the two-door Mark VII (introduced in 1984), with both vehicles featuring a "spare tire" trunklid.

Using the lessons learned from the badge engineering of the Versailles, Lincoln stylists took great care to visually distinguish the expensive Lincoln Continental from the Ford Granada and Mercury Cougar sedans. In contrast to the Cadillac Cimarron (also introduced for 1982), the Continental shared no visible body panels with any vehicles sharing its platform architecture.

=== Chassis ===
The first mid-size Lincoln, the 1982 Continental moved from the Panther platform (now used for the Lincoln Town Car) to the rear-wheel drive Ford Fox platform, adopting the long-wheelbase variant (108.5 inches) used by the Ford Thunderbird and Mercury Cougar XR7 coupes. In contrast to its 1980 predecessor, the 1982 Continental shed 18 inches in length and nearly 9 inches of wheelbase, along with over 400 pounds of weight.

The Continental introduced gas-charged shock absorbers (as an American industry first); retuned versions of the components were later introduced on the Mustang SVO. Four-wheel disc brakes made their return (for the first time since 1979), with hydroboost-assisted braking (unlike the SVO). As part of the 1984 model update, the coil springs were replaced by the 4-wheel air springs of the Mark VII, using a computer to maintain a constant ride height. For 1985, the Continental adopted 4-channel anti-lock brakes (ABS) alongside the Mark VII; far more advanced than the 1970s "Sure-Track" system used by the Mark IV and Mark V, ABS was standard on all Designer Series units and either standard or an option on 5.0L Continentals (though not any 2.4L vehicles).

==== Powertrain details ====
At its launch, the seventh-generation Continental was offered with two different engines. A carbureted 5.0 L V8 (producing 131 hp (98 kW)) was the standard engine. As a no-cost option, a 112 hp (84 kW) 3.8 L V6 was offered (the first non-V8 engine offered in a Lincoln since 1948). For 1983, both engines were dropped, replaced by a fuel-injected 5.0 L V8 shared with the Town Car. For 1984, the throttle-body 5.0 L gained electronic control for its fuel injection, increasing output to 140hp. For 1986, the V8 adopted the sequential fuel-injection (SEFI) system, sharing the 150hp version used by the Panther platform.

For the entire production of the seventh-generation Continental, the V6 and the V8 engines were exclusively paired with the 4-speed Ford AOD overdrive transmission.

In response to diesel-engine options offered by Cadillac and by several European luxury brands, Lincoln introduced a diesel-engine offering for 1984, sourcing a 2.4L inline-6 turbodiesel from BMW (with a ZF 4-speed automatic transmission), producing 114hp. Several revisions were made to the chassis to accommodate the new powertrain, including true dual exhaust, a heavier-duty radiator (adopted by the 1993 Ford Mustang Cobra R), additional hood insulation, and a rubber strip to minimize vibrations between the firewall and strut towers. Though capable of up to 35mpg on the highway, only 1,500 units were sold, leading Lincoln to discontinue the option after 1985.

=== Body ===
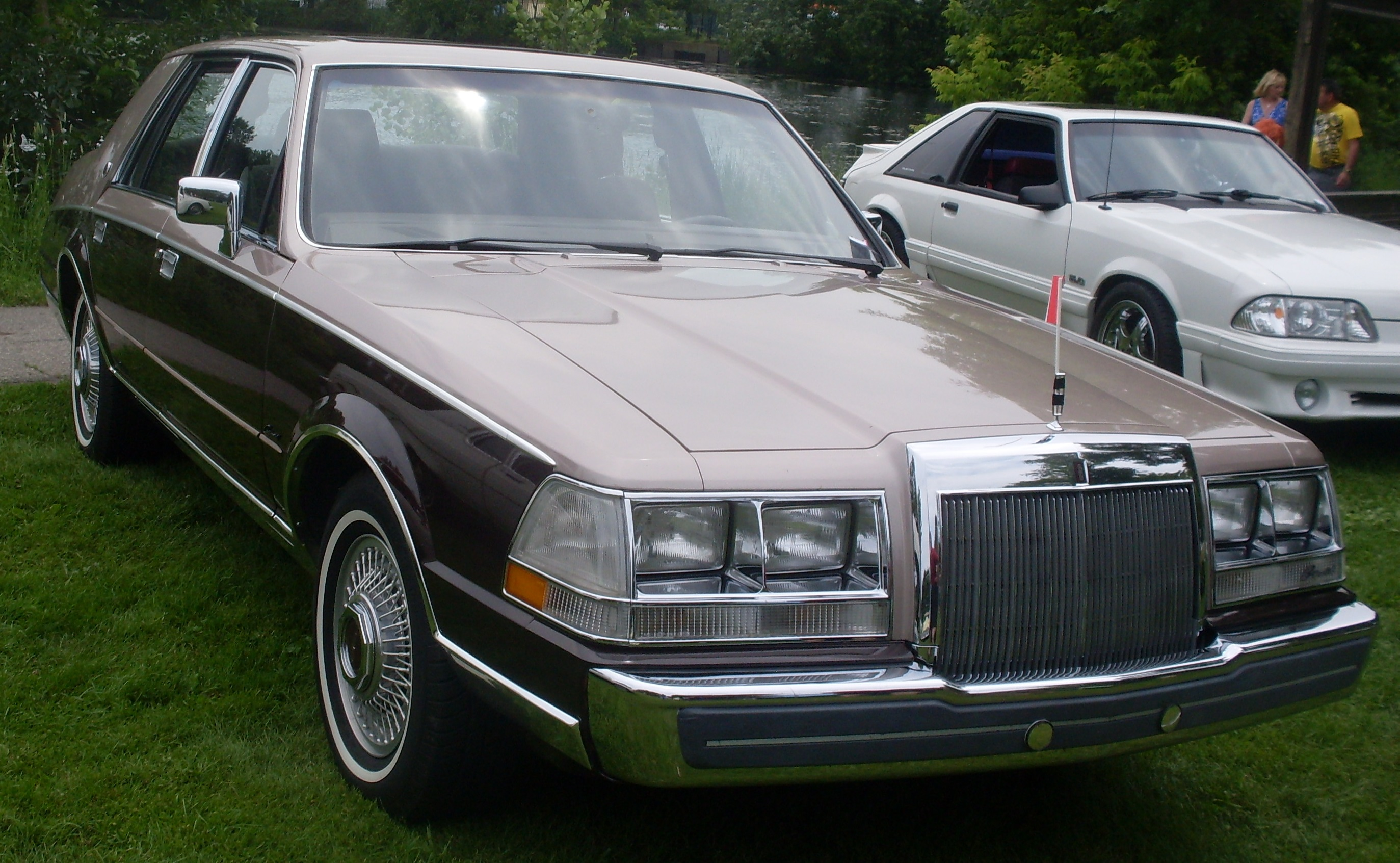
1984–1987 Lincoln Continental

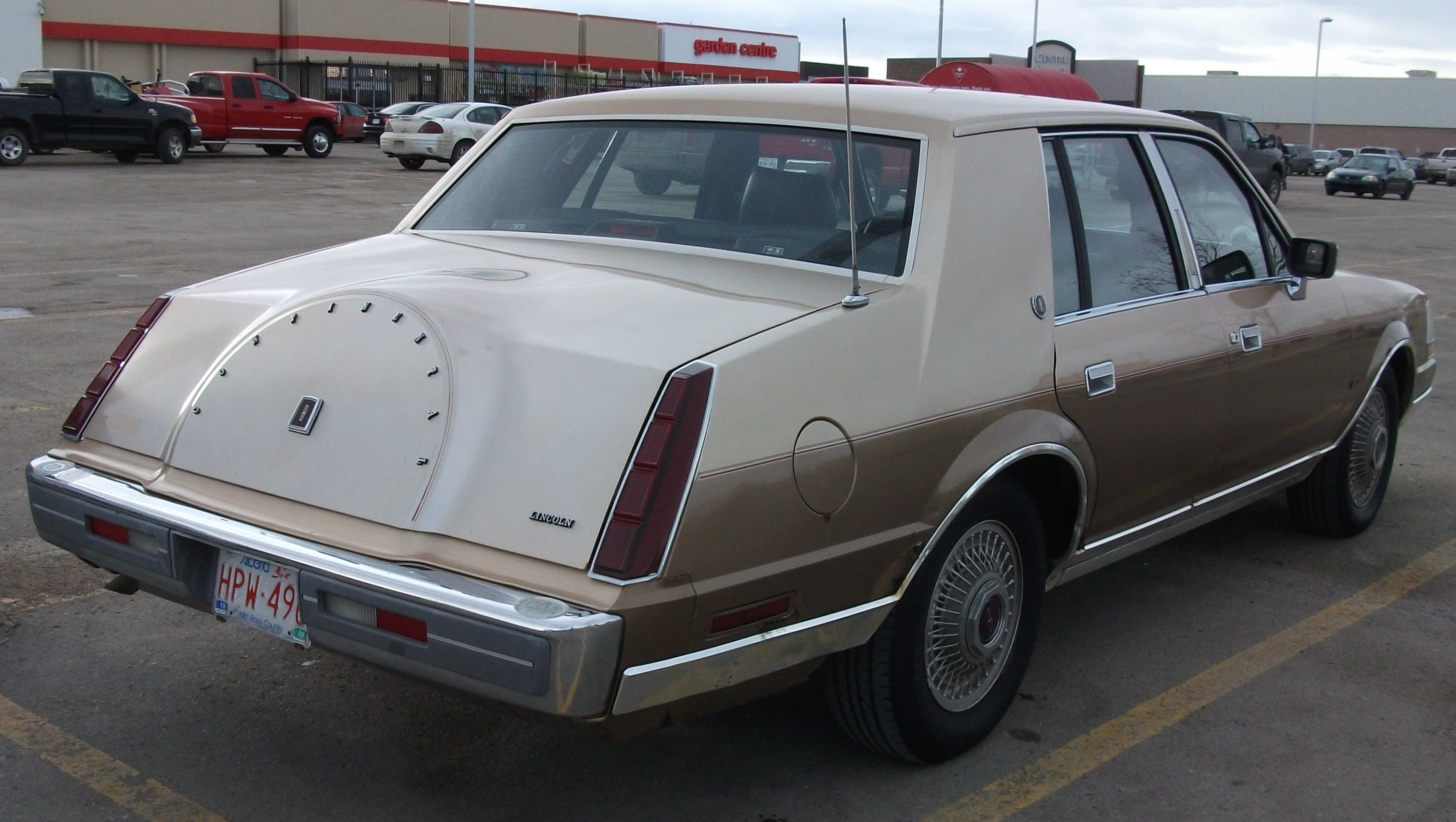
1986–1987 Lincoln Continental

Developed to compete with the Cadillac Seville, the 1982 Lincoln Continental shared its distinguishing styling feature: a sloping "bustle-back" decklid. The design feature had origins from the late 1930s (including certain models of the Lincoln-Zephyr) and was popularized after World War II by coachbuilt Rolls-Royce sedans; at the time, the Daimler DS420 limousine retained the design (until its 1992 retirement). Along with a longer, more upright-angled design (offered with plentiful two-tone color combinations), the bodywork was fitted with a horizontal brushed-chrome strip that ran along each side, giving it a more conventional appearance than the Seville and the (Chrysler) Imperial (a competitor to the Mark VI coupe that also offered similar rear bodywork design).

For the first time on a Lincoln-badged Continental, the model line was styled with its namesake "Continental spare tire" decklid (an identifying feature of the Mark series); unlike the Versailles (which had a similar decklid feature), the decklid was lettered "CONTINENTAL" rather than"LINCOLN". To reduce weight, the hood, bumpers, and front fenders were made of aluminum; the latter were spring-loaded, intended to discharge in the event of a collision (to reduce damage). All models were also fitted with Ford's proprietary door-mounted keypad system, marketed as its Securicode, (not to be confused with a Remote Keyless Entry System). For 1983, the front turn signal lenses were changed from clear to orange.

Inside, twin front bucket seats were now standard. A digital dashboard became standard equipment, including a multi-function trip computer. For 1983, the integrated garage door opener was updated to work three doors (effectively, a HomeLink transmitter of the time); an electrochromic rear-view mirror (self-dimming) was introduced as a first-time option.

==== 1984 revision ====
Coinciding with the introduction of the two-door Continental Mark VII, the Continental was given a styling update for the 1984 model year, bringing it closer in line with its two-door counterpart. To save costs, the aluminum bodywork (including the spring-loaded fenders) was removed from production. Though retaining recessed quad sealed-beam headlamps, the Continental adopted wraparound headlamp housings, which now integrated the cornering lamps. The decklid adopted the electric trunklid closure feature from the Mark VII as standard equipment. All Continentals now came with aluminum wheels, with a full disc wheel replacing the previous wheel covers. For 1985 only, the Continental dropped all Lincoln badging (alongside the Mark VII, it held a non-Lincoln VIN at the time). For 1986, the Continental saw its Lincoln badging return (as both it and the Mark VII officially adopted Lincoln VINs); to comply with government mandates, the model line adopted a center brake light (CHMSL).

The interior underwent an update; alongside adopting the digital instrument panel of the Mark VII, new seats were introduced, along with new (real) wood trim and an overhead console. For 1985, Lincoln added a hands-free mobile phone as an option; at $3,135, the expensive option was only offered for a single model year. For 1986, in another American industry first, the upgraded Ford JBL sound system offers a compact-disc player as a factory-installed option (two years after dropping the 8-track player). For 1987, the real wood trim of the interior was retired in favor of imitation wood.

=== Trim ===
For 1982, the Continental was offered in base trim, Signature Series, and Givenchy Designer Series trim. For 1983, the Signature Series was dropped by the Continental, with the base model adding a "Platinum" luxury option package; along with a namesake exterior color, the option standardized several luxury options. The Valentino Designer Series was added, including a separate exterior/interior design from the Givenchy Series; on Designer Series trunklids, the Lincoln star emblem was replaced by each the logo of each designer.

For 1986, the Valentino Designer Series was discontinued, leaving just the standard Continental and Givenchy Designer Series. Including many standard features, the higher-level trims added $3,100 to $3,500 to the price of a standard Continental ($8,700 to $9,800 in 2021). Fully optioned Signature and Givenchy trims would top out above over $26,500 ($74,400 in 2021).

=== Production ===
Lincoln Continental Production Figures
	Yearly Total
1982	23,908
1983	16,831
1984	30,468
1985	28,253
1986	19,012
1987	17,597
Total	136,069

Media related to Lincoln Continental (seventh generation) at Wikimedia Commons

== Eighth generation (1988–1994) ==
Eighth generation
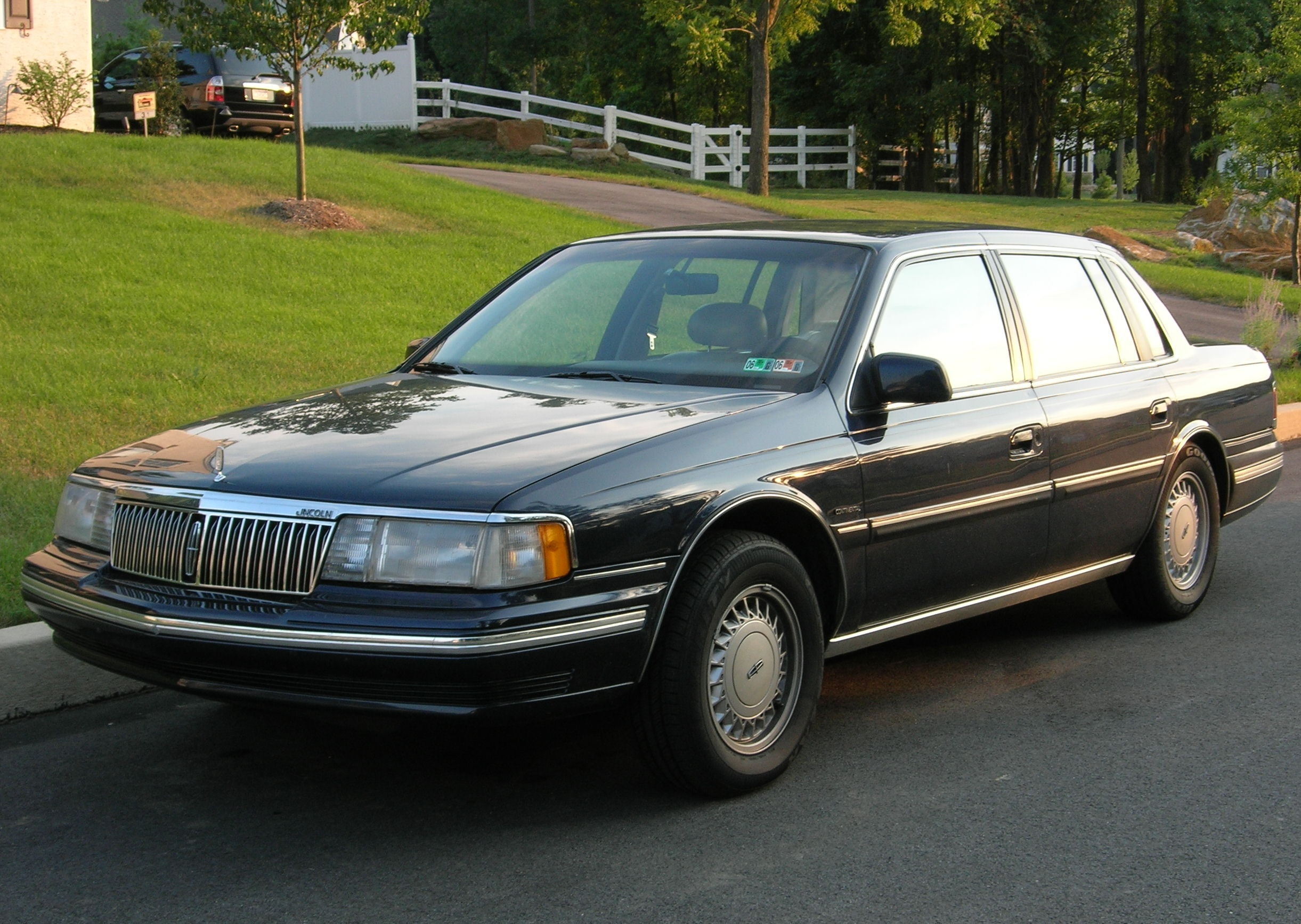
- 1991 Lincoln Continental

Overview
- Production: October 1987–1994
- Model years: 1988–1994
- Assembly: United States: Wixom, Michigan (Wixom Assembly)
- Designer: Jack Telnack (1984)

Body and chassis
- Body style: 4-door sedan
- Layout: FF layout
- Platform: Ford FN9 platform
- Related: Ford Taurus; Mercury Sable; Ford Windstar

Powertrain
- Engine: 3.8 L Essex V6
- Transmission: 4-speed AXOD-E automatic

Dimensions
- Wheelbase: 109.0 in (2,769 mm)
- Length: 1988–1993: 205.1 in (5,210 mm); 1994: 205.6 in (5,222 mm)
- Width: 1988–1993: 72.7 in (1,847 mm); 1992–94: 72.3 in (1,836 mm)
- Height: 1988–1991: 55.6 in (1,412 mm); 1992–94: 55.4 in (1,407 mm)

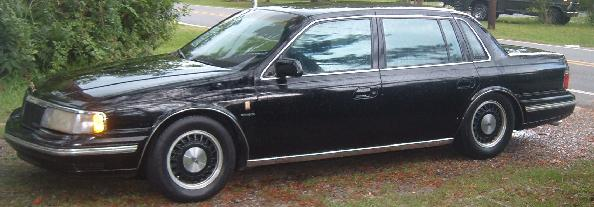
1989 Lincoln Continental Signature Series

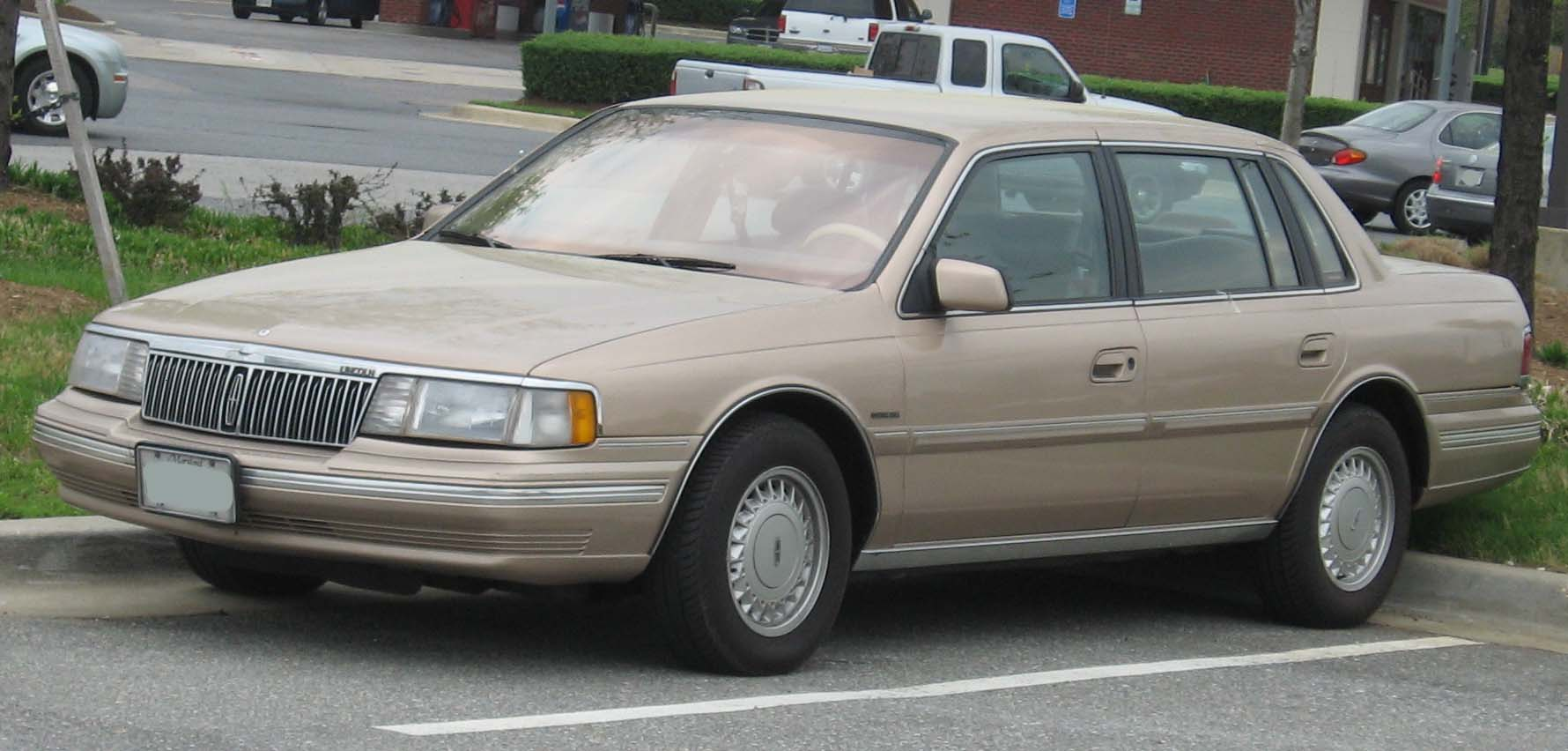
1990–1993 Lincoln Continental

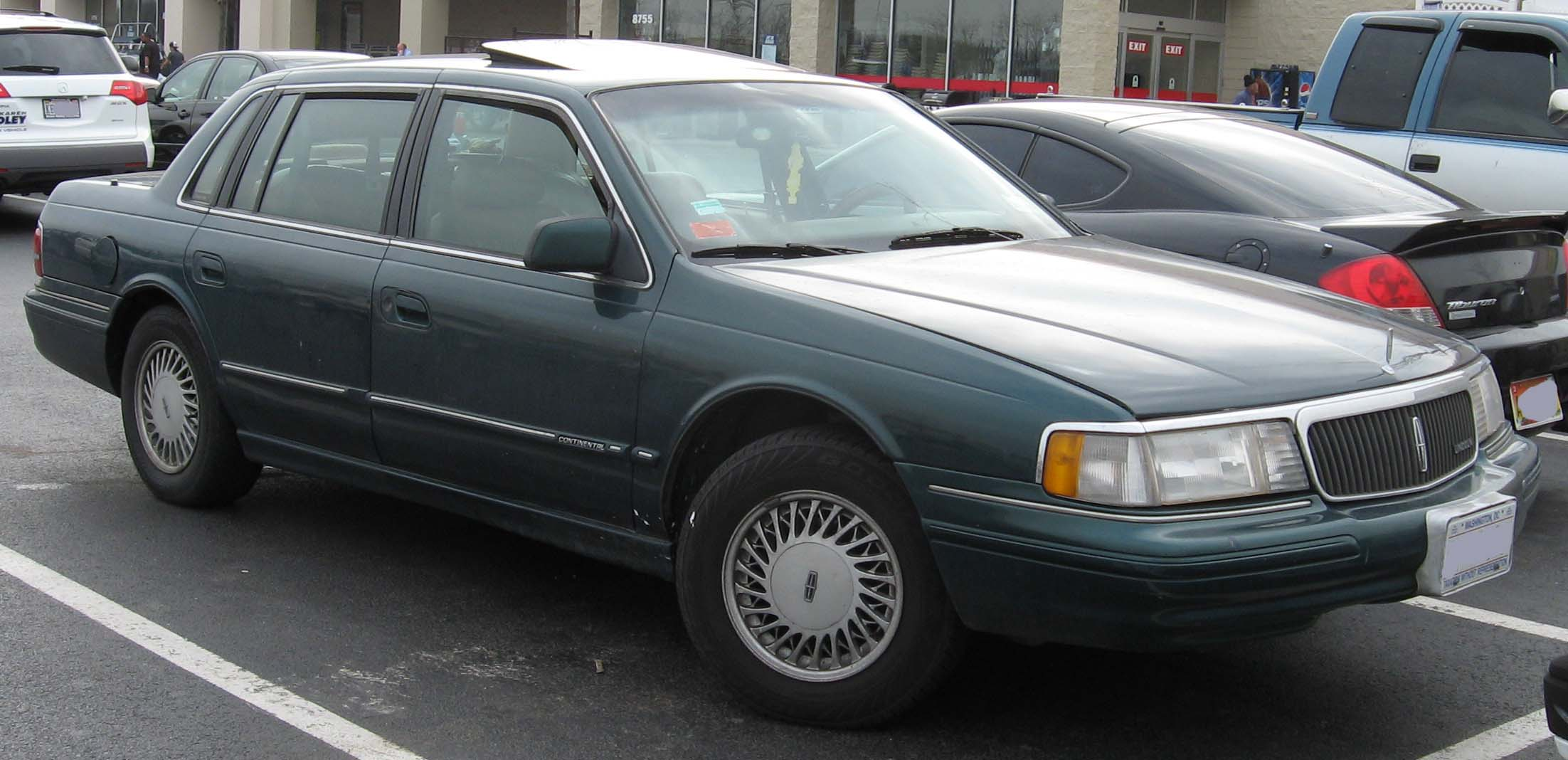
1994 Lincoln Continental

Lincoln began development of eighth generation model in the 4th quarter of 1981, the eighth generation sharing its unibody chassis with the Ford Taurus and Mercury Sable, using its own body and interior design and riding a three-inch longer wheelbase. This Continental became the first front-wheel drive Lincoln and the first Lincoln since 1948 marketed without an available V8 engine. Its conservative exterior no longer featured the sloping faux spare tire, and though four inches longer, the new model was 170 pounds lighter than its predecessor. For the first time since 1980, the Continental closely matched its Cadillac Sedan de Ville counterpart in size.

The 1988 Continental went on sale in December 1987.

By interior volume, the Continental was the largest front-wheel drive car marketed in 1988, and was recognized by Car and Driver on its 1989 Ten Best list. Power was provided by a 140 hp 3.8 L Essex V6 newly introduced to the Taurus/Sable for 1988. An exclusive feature to the Continental was adaptive air-ride suspension and variable assist power steering was standard. In 1990 (MY 1991), engine output was revised to 155 hp, and to 160 hp for MY 1993. All Continentals were equipped with a 4-speed overdrive automatic transmission.

Average annual sales for the eighth generation Continental doubled vs. the previous generation model and helped the Lincoln brand to achieve record total sales in 1989 and again in 1990.

=== Body ===
The Continental adopted much of the aerodynamic design language of the Taurus, but had a more upright C-pillar, chrome grille, longer deck. The redesign of the sloping trunklid increased trunk space from 15 to 19 cubic feet (nearly matching the Town Car).

In October 1988, for the 1989 model year, a redesigned dash was introduced to accommodate dual air bags. This unprecedented move made the Ford Motor Company the first US automaker to offer airbags as standard equipment for both the driver and front passenger (the second automaker worldwide after Porsche's 1987 944 Turbo). In 1989 for the 1990 model year, a minor exterior update featured a new grille, hood ornament, and taillights.

In late 1993 for MY 1994, the Continental received another facelift, with revised bumpers, rocker moldings, and bodyside moldings. Exterior trim was redesigned including a restyled argent-colored grille, redesigned taillamps, revised decklid trim, and the Lincoln nameplate is moved onto the grille and taillamps. The bucket seat option received a redesigned steering wheel.

=== Trim levels ===
As part of the redesign, Lincoln simplified the trim lineup; only standard (later named "Executive") and Signature Series remained. For the first time since 1981, 6-passenger seating made its return. Leather seats were standard (with velour available as a no-cost option).

Major options included a compact disc player, InstaClear electrically heated windshield (1988–1992), JBL sound system, power glass moonroof, door-mounted keypad system, marketed as SecuriCode, anti-theft alarm system, cellular phone (starting MY 1990), three-position memory seat, and choice of wheels. For model year 1993 (1992 production), an "Individual Seats" group was available which ditched the usual chrome column shifter and 50/50 "comfort lounge" split bench seating (and 6-passenger capacity) for a center console with floor shifter (a Continental first), storage armrest, cup holder, and 5 seats. 1994 was the last year that the Continental was offered in Executive and Signature Series trims. An Executive Touring package was also available.

=== Special edition ===
==== 50th Anniversary Edition (1990) ====
A 50th Anniversary Edition Continental Signature Series was offered during MY 1990 to commemorate the 50th anniversary of the model. It featured "50th Anniversary" badging, geometric spoked aluminum wheels with unique center hub ornaments, titanium exterior paint with unique red/blue accent striping, and two-tone interior.

=== Production ===
Lincoln Continental Production Figures
	Yearly Total
1988	41,287
1989	55,083
1990	64,257
1991	52,066
1992	39,765
1993	25,760
1994	49,771
Total	327,989

Media related to Lincoln Continental (eighth generation) at Wikimedia Commons

== Ninth generation (1995–2002) ==
Ninth generation
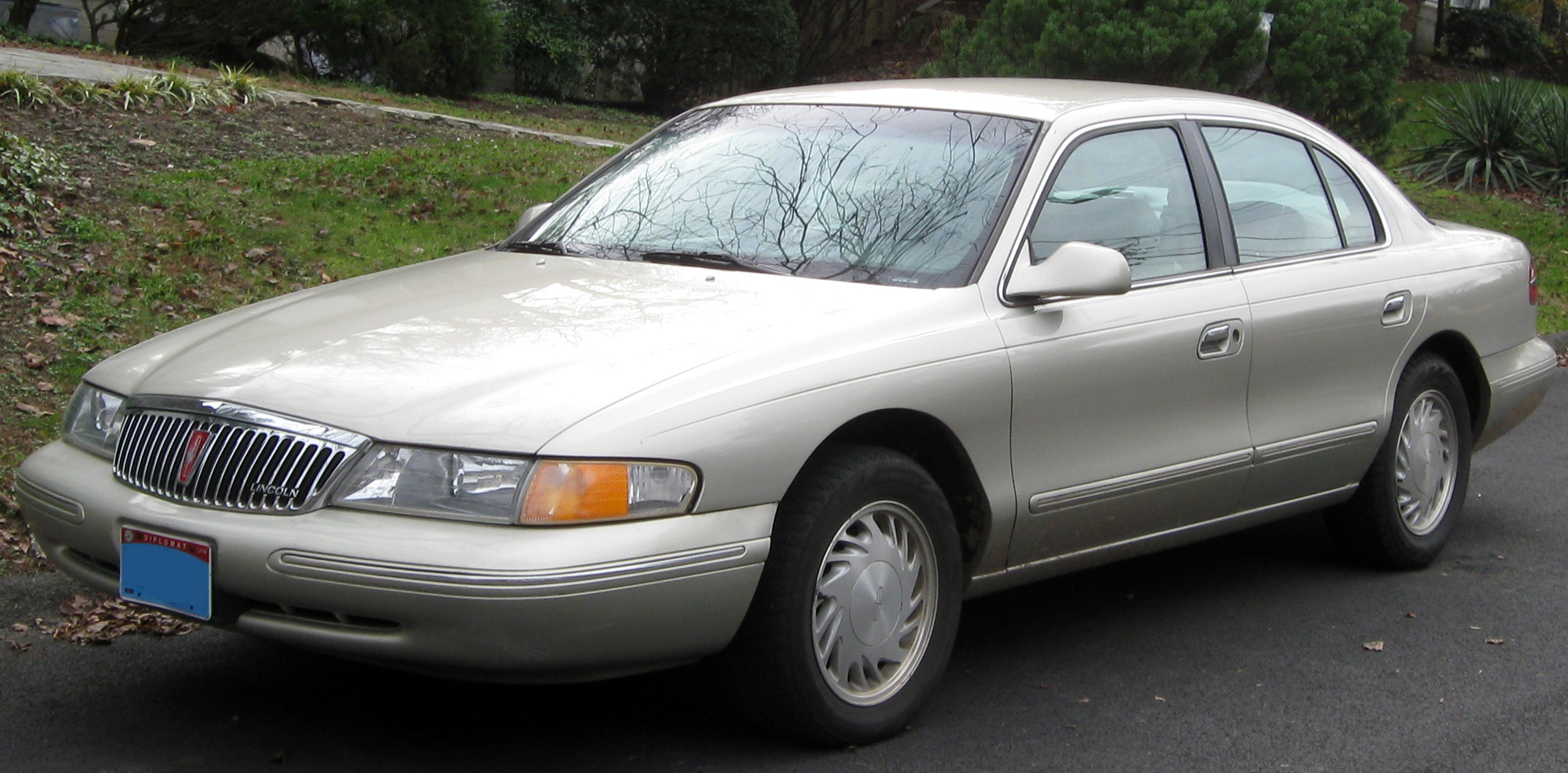
- 1995–1997 Lincoln Continental

Overview
- Production: November 1994 – July 26, 2002
- Model years: 1995–2002
- Assembly: United States: Wixom, Michigan (Wixom Assembly)
- Designer: Fritz Mayhew (1991)

Body and chassis
- Body style: 4-door sedan
- Layout: FF layout
- Platform: Ford FN9 platform
- Related: Ford Taurus; Mercury Sable; Ford Windstar

Powertrain
- Engine: 4.6 L InTech V8
- Transmission: 4-speed AX4N automatic

Dimensions
- Wheelbase: 109.0 in (2,769 mm)
- Length: 1995–1997: 206.3 in (5,240 mm); 1998–2002: 208.5 in (5,296 mm)
- Width: 73.6 in (1,869 mm)
- Height: 56.0 in (1,422 mm)
- Curb weight: 3,868 lb (1,754 kg)

Chronology
- Successor: Lincoln MKS

The ninth generation continental was launched for the 1995 model year on December 26, 1994 using the front-drive underpinnings from the previous generation with complete interior and exterior styling revisions, closely following cues from the Lincoln Contempra concept presented in early 1994.

With a transversely-mounted V8 engine from Ford's Modular engine family — the only production vehicle in which a Modular engine was so oriented — and a base price at launch of $40,750 (equivalent to $88,500 in 2025), production began at Wixom Assembly in November 1994.

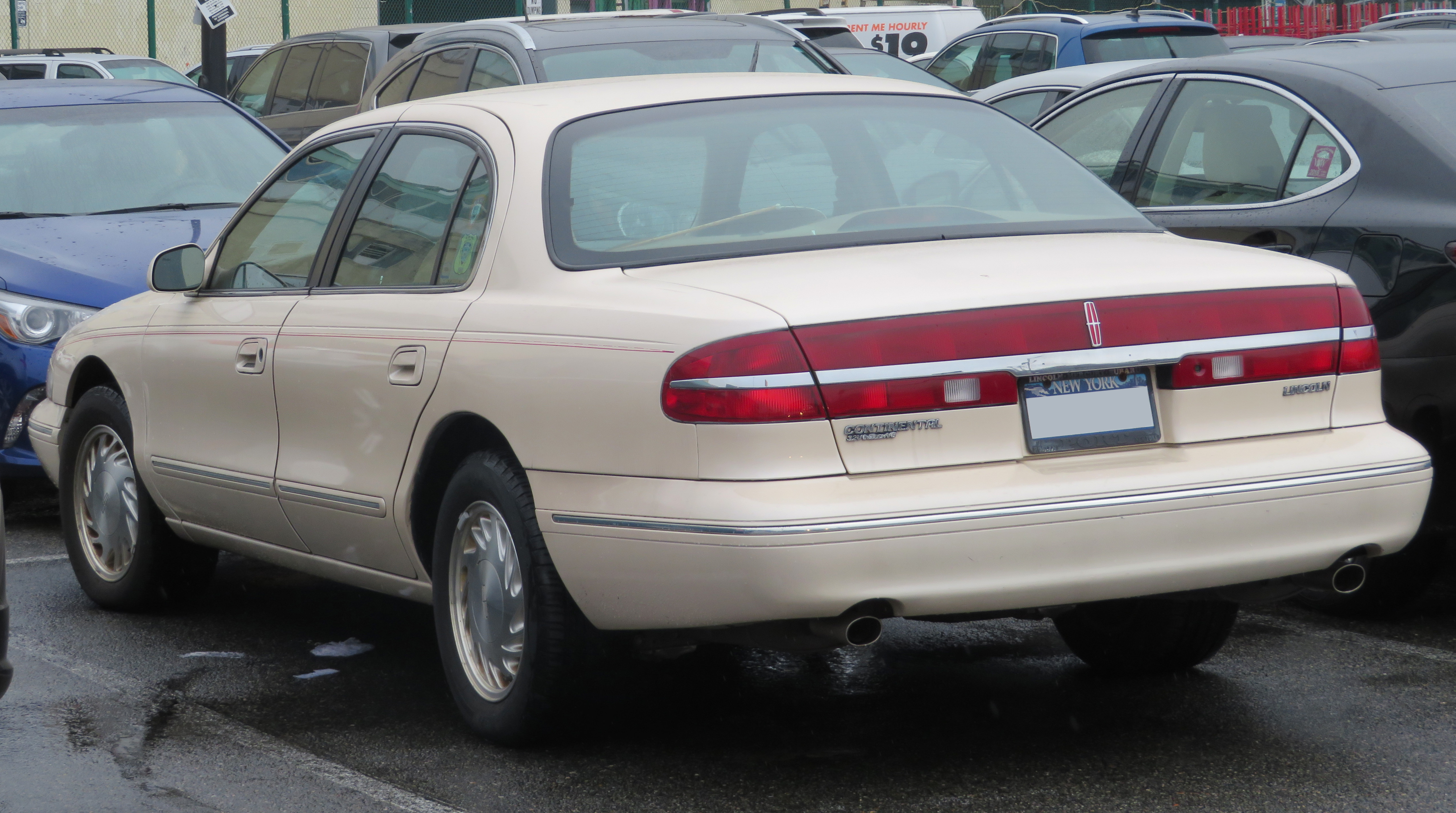
1995–1997 Lincoln Continental rear view

The Continental used the Modular/InTech 32v DOHC 4.6L V8 shared with the Lincoln Mark VIII, slightly de-tuned for the front drive application. It produced 260 hp (190 kW) and 265 lb⋅ft (359 N⋅m) torque; for a 0–60 mph (0–97 km/h) time of 7.2 seconds.

Inside, the Continental featured a leather interior with optional JBL sound system, 6-CD changer, power moonroof, heated seats, onboard cellular phone, anti-theft alarm system, traction control, and chrome wheels. As before, buyers could choose between five and six-passenger seating as well as Bridge of Weir leather on upper trim packages.

1995 and 1996 Continentals used air ride suspension on all four wheels and 1997 models used only rear air suspension — and traditional steel coil springs up front. An increasingly competitive luxury market and decontenting of the 1997 Continental saw its base price decreased by 10% that year.

=== 1998 facelift ===
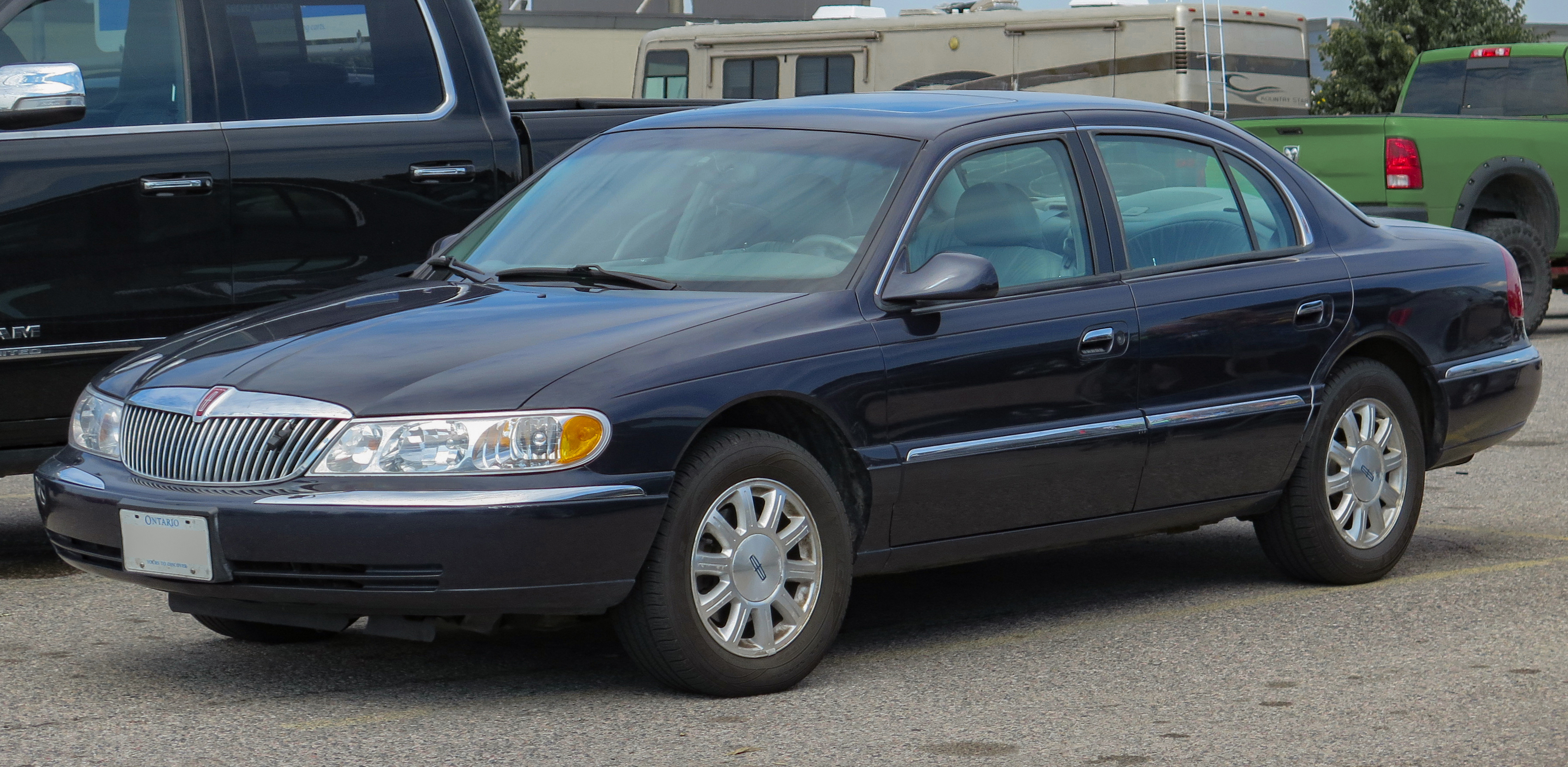
1998–2002 Lincoln Continental

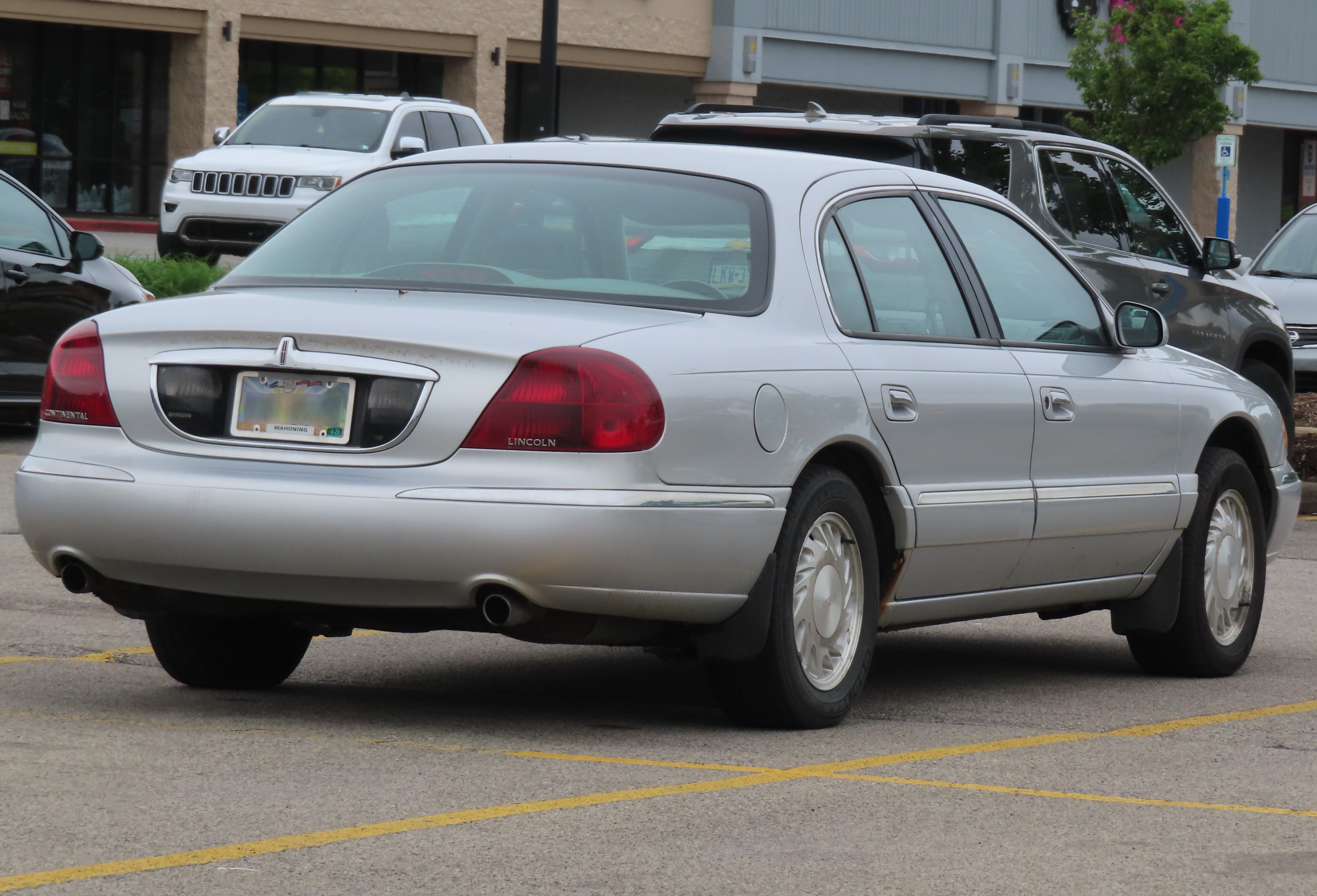
1998–2002 Lincoln Continental rear view

The Continental was updated in late 1997 for the 1998 model year, with revised front and rear styling. For 1998 the instrument panel was redesigned, retaining the reflective dash cluster. Fender, hood and rear deck lid were again dent-resistant Sheet Molded Composite (SMC). Pricing on the Continental was up only slightly over the 1997 model which itself had seen a price reduction from the year before.

The Continental received a price increase for the 1999 model year to MSRP $38,525 (~$69,907 in 2025) — the same price as the Town Car. The Continental offered buyers front wheel drive, while the Town Car remained rear wheel drive, and was joined by the slightly smaller Lincoln LS.

The ninth generation Continental featured seat-mounted side airbags and a power increase to 275 hp (205 kW). Six-passenger seating was available via the no-charge option of a split-bench front seat and column shifter. Also available on the 1999 Continental was the "RESCU package" (Remote Emergency Satellite Cellular Unit) which included Global satellite positioning (similar to GM's "OnStar"), 3-channel HomeLink compatible garage door opener mounted in the driver's sun visor, voice-activated cellular telephone, and the Alpine audio system (which included a digital sound processor, subwoofer amplifier, and additional speakers). Optional features includes a 6-disc CD changer, heated front seats, and a tinted glass power sunroof with sliding shade.

For the 1999 model year, Lincoln offered an optional Luxury Appearance Package that included a wood-trimmed steering wheel and shift knob with two-tone seat trim and floor mats inside, and chrome alloy wheels and a revised grille up front. Other available packages were the "Driver Select System" which included a semi-active suspension, selectable ride control, steering wheel-mounted controls for the audio and climate systems, automatic day/night outside mirrors, the "Memory Profile System" that recalled power steering assist and ride control settings for two drivers, and the "Personal Security Package" which included special run-flat tires mounted on polished alloy wheels, low tire pressure alert system, and universal garage door opener.

Between the 2000 and 2002 model years, changes to the Continental remained minor as production of the model neared its end. In the year 2000, child seat-anchor brackets, emergency trunk release, and a "Belt Minder" system became available. In 2001, the universal garage door opener became standard. A new Vehicle Communication System (VCS) featuring hands-free voice activated phone, Safety and Security Services (SOS), information services, and route guidance assistance was optional for 2002.

=== Special editions ===
==== Diamond Anniversary Edition (1996) ====
To commemorate the 75th anniversary of Lincoln, a Diamond Anniversary Edition of the Continental was offered as an option package. The package included "Diamond Anniversary" badging, leather seats, voice-activated cellular phone, JBL audio system, auto electrochromatic dimming mirror with compass, and traction control.

==== Spinnaker Edition (1996) ====
As a continuation of the version offered the year before on the Town Car, Lincoln offered a Spinnaker Edition of the 1996 Continental. The option package featured "Spinnaker Edition" badging, tri-coat paint, two-tone leather seats, and 16" spoked aluminum wheels.

==== Limited Edition (2001) ====
For 2001, a Limited Edition was offered, featuring unique leather interior with "Limited" embroidery, two-tone interior trim, wood steering wheel, 6-disc CD changer, and 16-inch spoked aluminum wheels. It was sold as a Greenbrier Limited Edition Continental in select markets.

==== Collector's Edition (2002) ====
To commemorate the end of the model run for 2002, a Collector's Edition was offered featuring a genuine walnut burl steering wheel, instrument panel, and side door trim, "CE" logos, platinum painted grille, 10-spoke chrome wheels, and more. In addition to the Continental's other exterior color choices, a CE-exclusive charcoal gray was also available. Approximately 2,000 were produced.

=== Sales ===
Calendar Year	American sales
1995	40,708
1996	32,019
1997	31,220
1998	35,210
1999	26,246
2000	22,648
2001	20,392
2002	15,435
2003	280

=== Discontinuation and replacement ===
After several years of declining sales, Lincoln announced that 2002 would be the last year for the Continental. Along with declining sales of the model line, Lincoln faced a significant model overlap as the Continental, LS V8, and Town Car competed in nearly the same price range. As the LS V8 was a mid-size sport luxury sedan and the Town Car was a full-size luxury sedan, the Continental was withdrawn, with the final ninth-generation vehicle manufactured at the Wixom Assembly production line on July 26, 2002.

After 2002, the Continental was not directly replaced. For 2009, Lincoln introduced the MKS; while intended to replace the Town Car (which remained until 2011), the MKS was closer in length and width to the ninth-generation Continental and based on a front-wheel drive chassis (with all-wheel drive as an option). In place of a V8 engine, the MKS offered a twin-turbocharged V6 as an option. For the 2017 model year, the MKS was replaced by the new tenth-generation Continental.

== Tenth generation (2017–2020) ==
Tenth generation
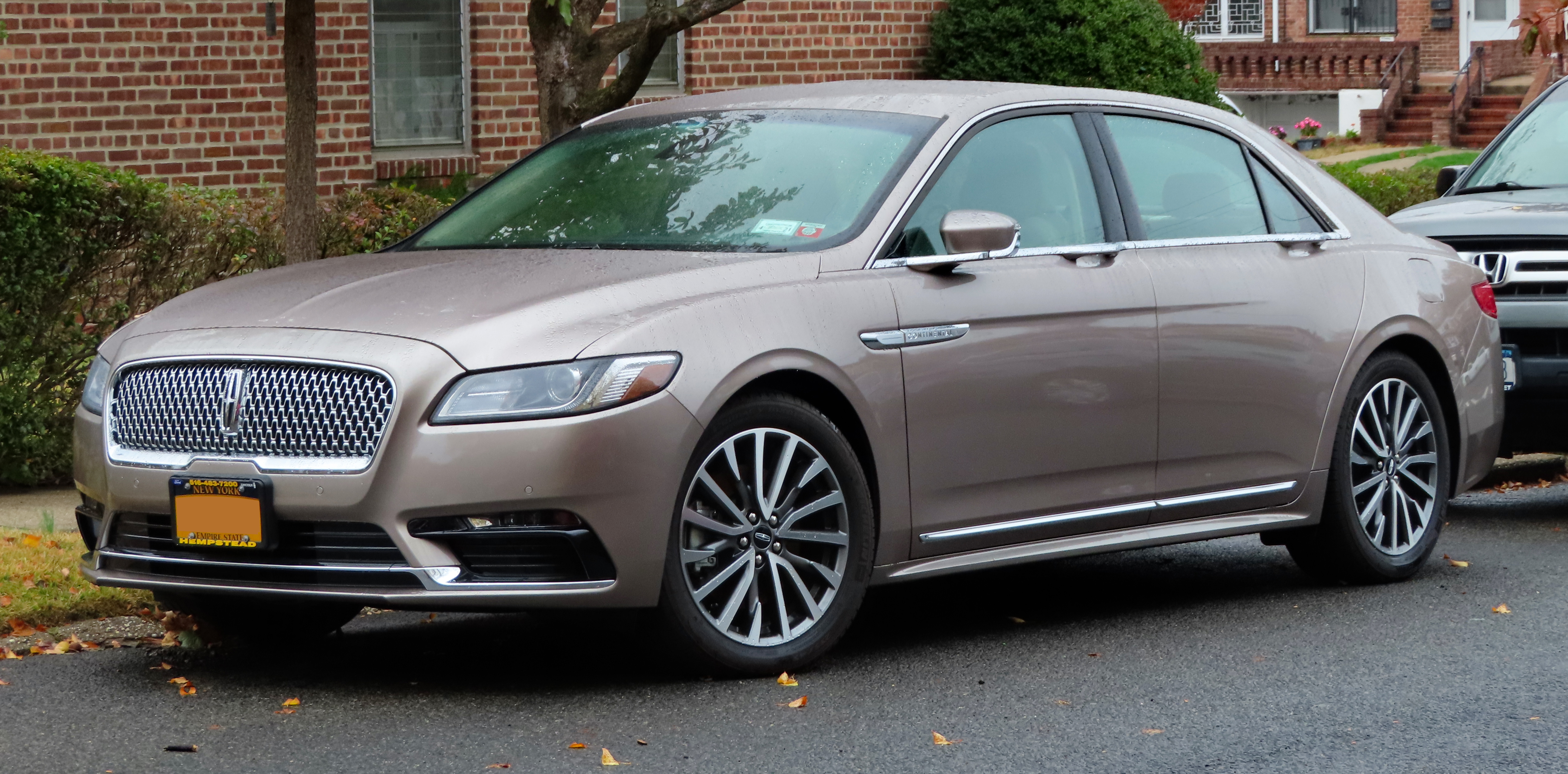
- 2019 Lincoln Continental Select

Overview
- Production: 2016 – October 2020
- Model years: 2017–2020
- Assembly: United States: Flat Rock, Michigan (Flat Rock Assembly Plant)
- Designer: Max Wolff (2013), David Woodhouse (2014)

Body and chassis
- Class: Full-size luxury car
- Body style: 4-door sedan
- Layout: Transverse, FF layout / F4 layout
- Platform: Ford CD4 platform
- Doors: Conventional doors (4 doors); Conventional doors (front)/Coach Doors (rear) (Lincoln Coach Door Edition)
- Related: Lincoln MKZ; Ford Fusion; Ford Mondeo; Ford Taurus (China)

Powertrain
- Engine: 3.7 L Cyclone V6; 2.7 L EcoBoost V6 twin-turbo 3.0 L EcoBoost V6 twin-turbo
- Transmission: 6F55 6-speed automatic

Dimensions
- Wheelbase: 117.9 in (2,995 mm); 123.9 in (3,147 mm) (Coach Door Edition)
- Length: 201.4 in (5,116 mm); 207.4 in (5,268 mm) (Coach Door Edition)
- Width: 75.3 in (1,913 mm)
- Height: 58.5 in (1,486 mm)
- Curb weight: 4,224–4,547 lb (1,916–2,062 kg)

Chronology
- Predecessor: Lincoln MKS

After a fourteen-year hiatus, the tenth generation Continental went on sale in the fall of 2016. Previewed by a namesake concept car at the 2015 New York Auto Show, the 2017 Continental succeeded the Lincoln MKS, and was manufactured at Ford's Flat Rock Assembly.

Production of the Continental ended on October 30, 2020, without a replacement for the full-size sedan segment.

=== Chassis ===
The tenth-generation Lincoln Continental uses an extended-wheelbase variant of the CD4 platform, shared with the seventh-generation Ford Taurus. At 117.9 inches, the Continental is the longest-wheelbase Lincoln sedan since 1979 with the exception of the long wheelbase L Town Cars. Depending on trim, all-wheel drive is either optional or standard equipment, as the first generation to use of all-wheel drive.

The Continental is powered exclusively by V6 engines. The standard engine is a 305 hp 3.7 L Ti-VCT V6, shared with the MKZ and MKS. As an option, a 335 hp 2.7 L twin-turbocharged V6 is available, shared with the Lincoln MKX. At the top of the engine lineup, the Continental is fitted with a 400 hp (298 kW) 3.0 L twin-turbocharged V6; exclusive to the Continental and MKZ, the 3.0 L engine is the highest-horsepower engine ever fitted to a production Lincoln sedan (Navigator SUV is available with 450 hp (336 kW) 3.5 L twin-turbo V6). All three engines are paired with a six-speed automatic transmission. When fitted with the 3.0 L engine, all-wheel drive (with torque vectoring) is standard equipment.

Engine	Configuration	Output	Transmission
3.7 L Ti-VCT V6 (Ford Cyclone 37)	3.7 L (227 cu in) DOHC 24V V6	305 hp (227 kW; 309 PS) at 6500 rpm 280 lb⋅ft (380 N⋅m) at 4000 rpm	Ford 6F55/SelectShift 6-speed automatic
2.7 L Twin-turbocharged V6 (EcoBoost Nano 2.7L)	2.7 L (164 cu in) DOHC 24V V6 twin-turbocharged	335 hp (250 kW; 340 PS) at 5500 rpm 380 lb⋅ft (515 N⋅m) at 3000 rpm	Ford 6F55/SelectShift 6-speed automatic
3.0 L Twin-turbocharged V6 (EcoBoost Nano 3.0L)	3.0 L (183 cu in) DOHC 24V V6 twin-turbocharged, gasoline direct injection	400 hp (298 kW; 406 PS) at 5750 rpm 400 lb⋅ft (542 N⋅m) at 2750 rpm	Ford 6F55/SelectShift 6-speed automatic

=== Body ===
The tenth-generation Continental introduced a new front end design theme for the Lincoln division, shifting from the previous “bow wave” split grille to a slightly recessed rectangular design. Standard equipment includes electrically latched doors marketed as E-Latch, which also pulls the door closed. Interior door panels use a button near the door pull handle to unlatch the door; on the outside, the exterior door pulls are integrated into the beltline window trim, reminiscent of the third generation Ford Thunderbird.

Rather than a console- or column-mounted transmission shifter, the transmission is controlled by "PRNDS" buttons mounted to the left of the infotainment/navigation touch screen. "S" represents "Sport mode", where the suspension, power steering, and transmission shifting are programmed for more spirited driving. While largely done in an effort to increase center console space, the layout is a similar approach to the Mercury, Chrysler and Packard designs of the mid-1950s (though the Continental is also fitted with paddle shifters as standard equipment). As an option, the Continental is available with either 13 or 19-speaker audio systems from the "Revel" division of Harman, distinguished by aluminum speaker grilles in the door panels. As with the Lincoln MKS, the Continental is fitted with adaptive cruise control and lane-keeping technology, as an option, the Continental offers a 360-degree camera system to produce a "virtual overhead view" of the vehicle.

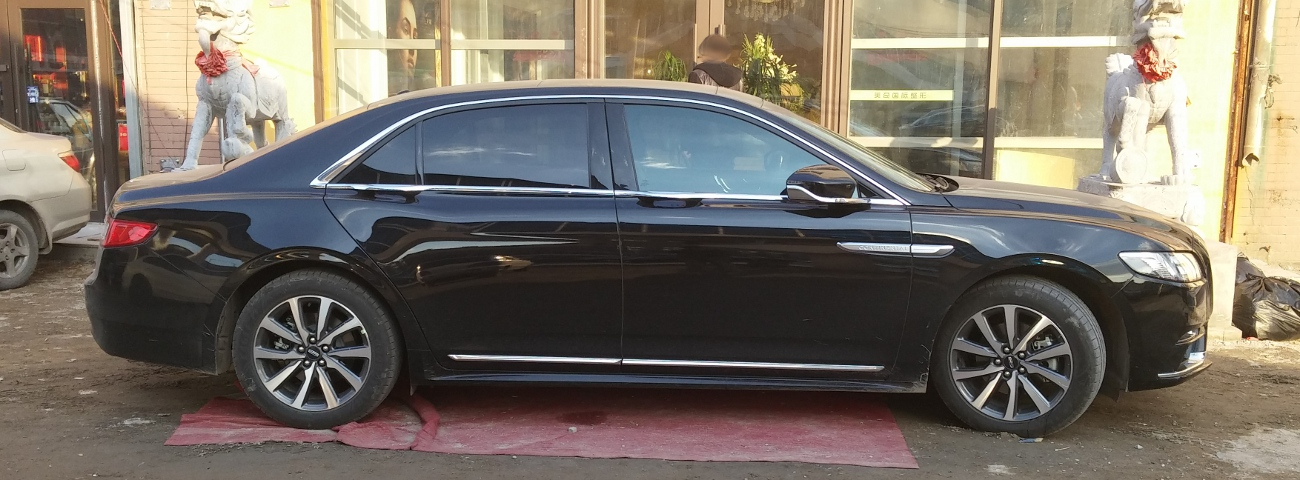
2017 Lincoln Continental, side view (Changchun, China)

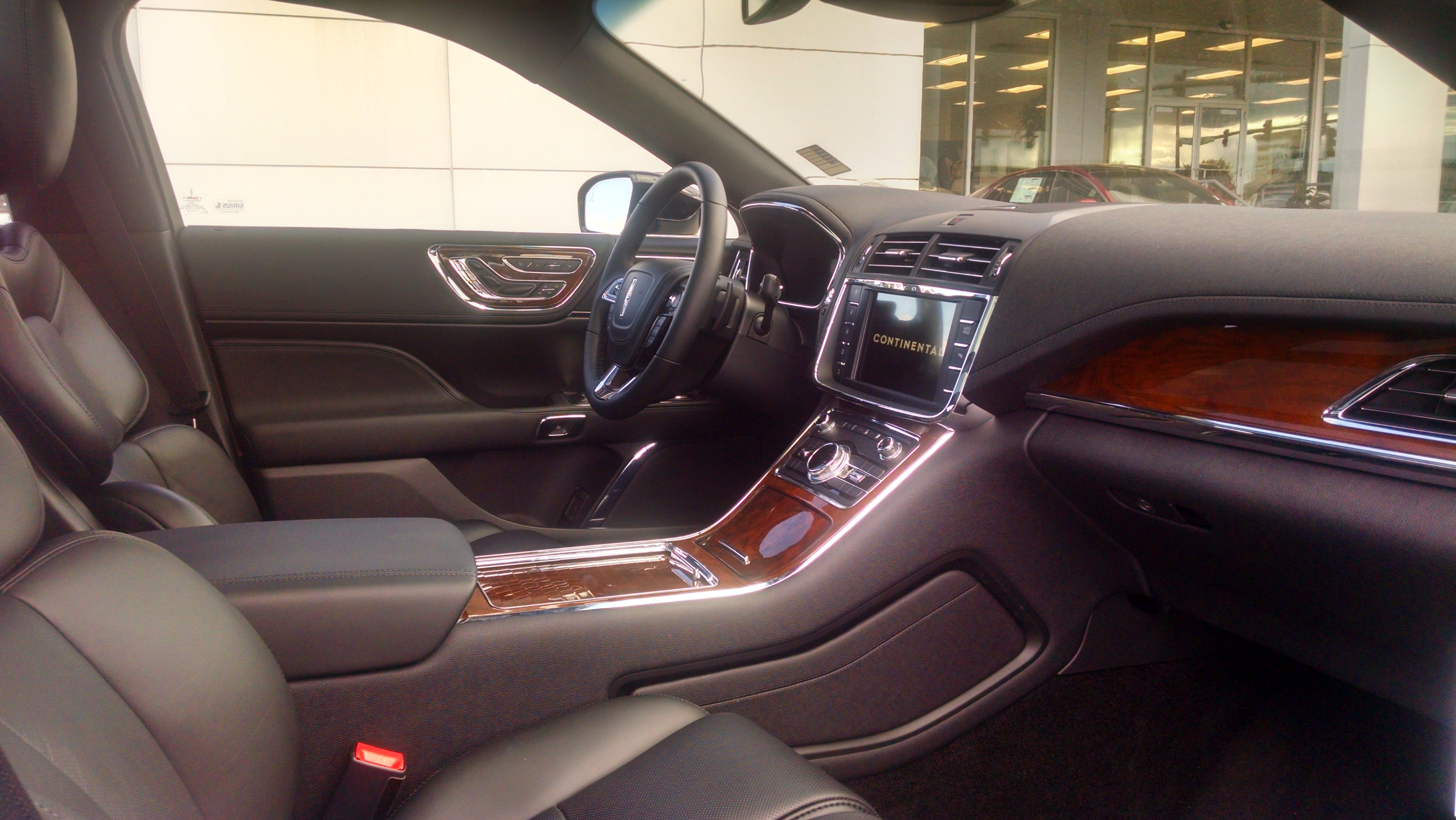
2017 Lincoln Continental interior

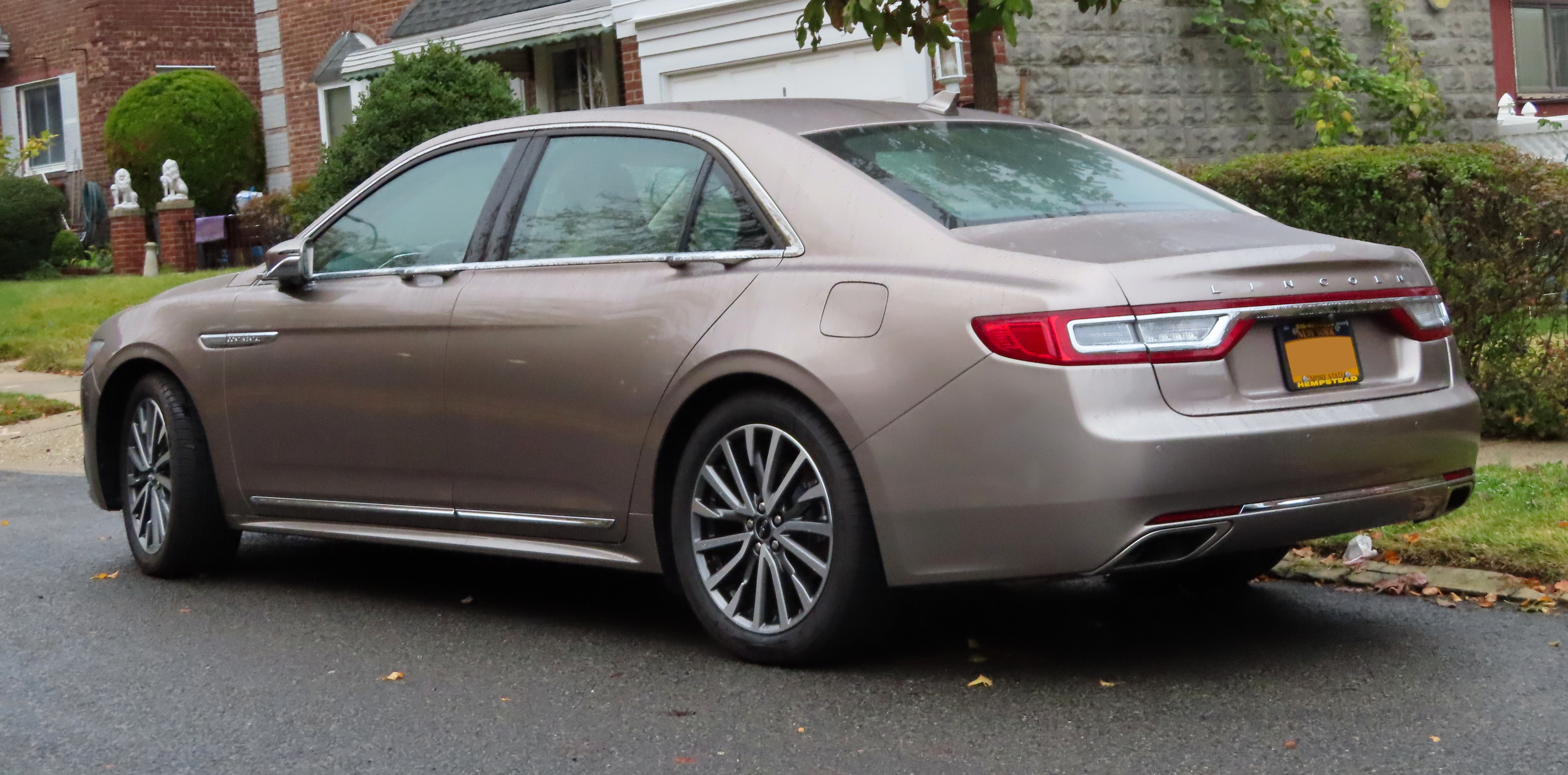
2019 Lincoln Continental, rear view

=== Trim ===
The Continental was offered in four trim levels, Premiere, Select, Reserve and Black Label trim. Special leather, marketed as Bridge of Weir "Deepsoft" leather is used for upper-level trim (Select and Reserve). For the Black Label trim level, vehicles have specially coordinated exterior and interior appearance packages, including Chalet, Thoroughbred and Rhapsody Blue (exclusive to the Continental), the latter including blue leather appointed seats, Alcantara synthetic suede, shearling carpets, mesh and aluminized fiberglass accents.

Continental chief engineer Michael Celentino noted the difficulty of executing the blue interior: "Blue is a color on a knife edge, it has elements of green and red that are incredibly difficult to match on all the materials in an interior, especially when you consider the differing grain and gloss of materials ranging from the seats to the dashboard to the headliner. If you’re not careful, blue will ‘flop’ and look like those other colors when the light hits it from some angles. Ford designers ultimately gave a specific mix of hues to its colorant supplier: "with other colors, that supplier would tell parts makers what hue to mix to get the right result, but Rhapsody is so demanding that Ford shipped the completed mix to each supplier to get an identical shade on seats, plastic, carpet, dash, console, doors and headliner."

Lincoln design director David Woodhouse says. “Blue was Lincoln’s iconic color. The Ford family always had dark blue Continentals. Hollywood studio MGM had a special blue created to match Liz Taylor’s eyes and gave her a Continental Mark II car that color."

=== Coach Door Editions ===
To commemorate the 80th anniversary of the 1939 Edsel Ford prototype, Lincoln introduced a Coach Door Edition of the Continental. The first Lincoln to feature rear-hinged passenger doors since the 1969 Continental, the vehicle is a license-built conversion of the Continental. Beginning assembly as a standard Continental at Flat Rock Assembly, the rear-hinged doors are installed by Cabot Coach Builders, a Massachusetts-based Ford QVM (Qualified Vehicle Modifier). To accommodate the longer rear doors, the company performs a six-inch wheelbase extension and reinforces the frame. The rear seat is reconfigured for two-passenger seating and a full-length center console.

Sold exclusively in the United States, 80 examples of the 80th Anniversary Coach Door Edition were produced. The first Lincoln vehicle with a base price above $100,000, the Black Label trim was standard; the 400hp 3.0T twin-turbocharged V6 was paired with all-wheel drive.

For 2020, a non-commemorative Coach Door Edition was offered with the same powertrain and Black Label trim; approximately 150 were produced.

=== Sales ===
Calendar year	United States	China
2016	5,261	204
2017	12,012	10,501
2018	8,758	10,489
2019	6,586	N/A
2020	5,262	3,710
2021	1,460	2,758
2022	N/A	2

== Concept cars ==
=== 2002 (Los Angeles Auto Show) ===
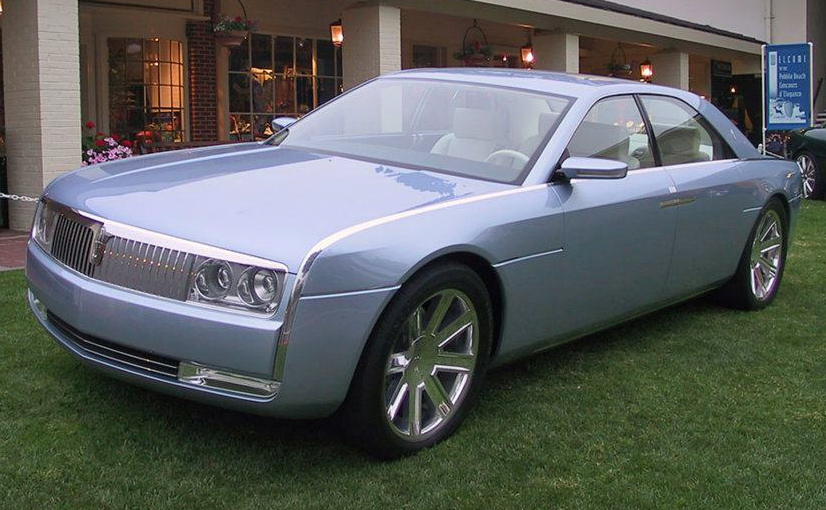
2002 Lincoln Continental concept (2002 Pebble Beach Concours d'Elegance)

One of the first projects of Lincoln under PAG, a Lincoln Continental concept car, was unveiled at the 2002 Los Angeles Auto Show. Combining advanced design features with traditional Lincoln design elements, the vehicle was a full-size sedan intended to maximize passenger and cargo space; at 214.3 inches long, it was an inch shorter than a 2002 Town Car. The rear-wheel drive sedan was fitted with a 414 hp (309 kW) 6.0L V12 paired with a 6-speed automatic transmission. To ease passenger access, the Continental uses rear-hinged coach doors (in line with 1960s Lincolns); to further increase cabin space, a 136.6-inch wheelbase is used, effectively centering the passenger compartment.

Though the concept never reached production, several of its design elements were adapted into the Lincoln line, as its roofline was adapted by the 2006 Lincoln Zephyr (later MKZ) and its front fascia was adapted by the 2007–2010 MKX.

=== 2015 (New York Auto Show) ===
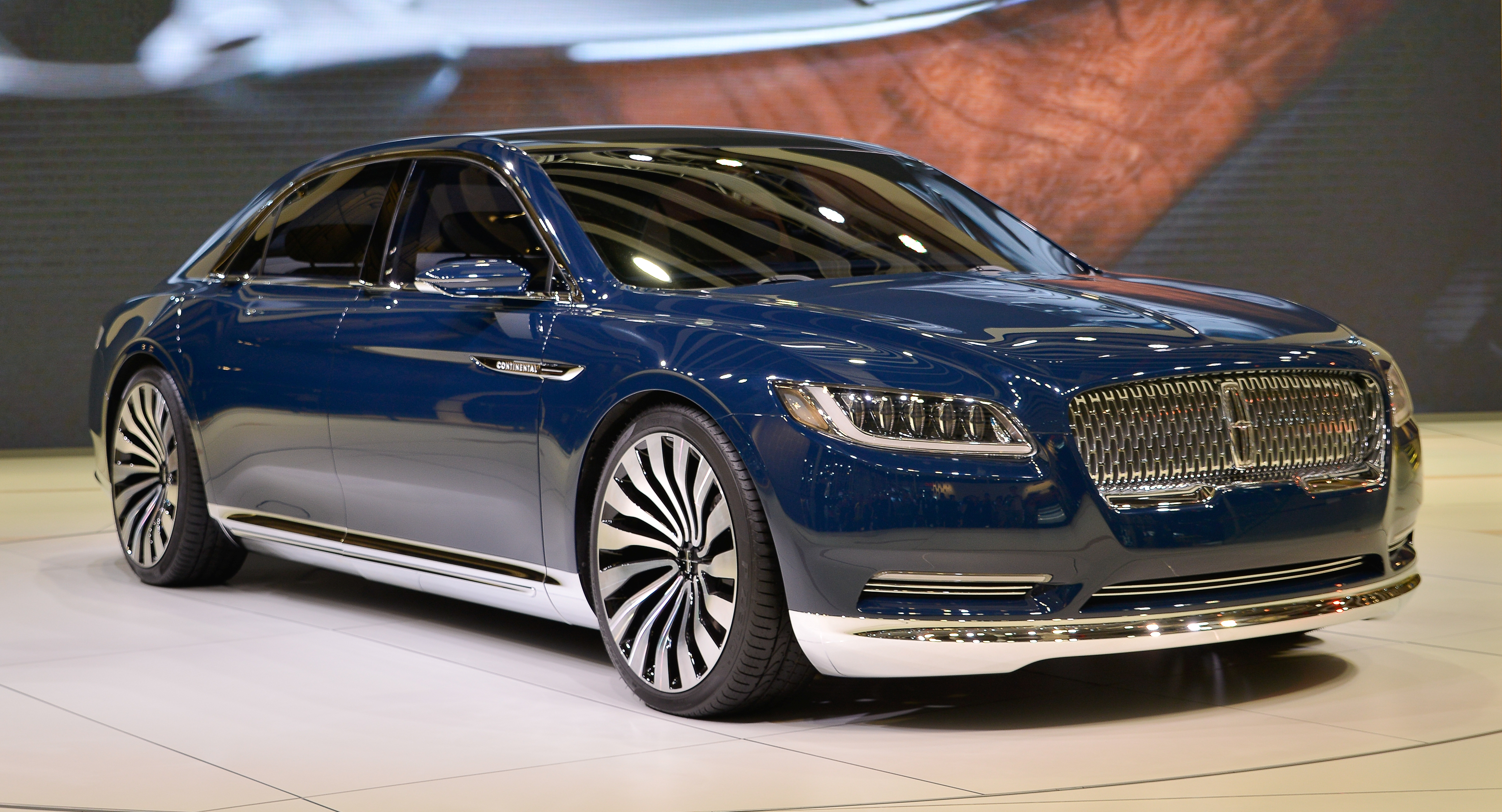
2015 Lincoln Continental (2015 Shanghai Auto Show)

At the 2015 New York International Auto Show, Lincoln unveiled a Lincoln Continental concept sedan, serving as a preview for the replacement of the Lincoln MKS. The "rhapsody blue" interior also served as a preview of the flagship Black Label trim. Though Lincoln did identify a 3.0L twin-turbo V6 as the engine for the car, it did not identify the driven wheels or platform architecture of the production vehicle.

The 2017 production Continental saw several revisions from the concept car, which was fitted with a full-length glass roof and a 2+2 seating configuration (the latter would be seen with the Coach Door Edition). Along with smaller-diameter wheels and body-color lower body trim, the production vehicle has larger air intakes in the front bumper, larger sideview mirrors, and revised headlamps and taillamps (to comply with US design standards).
