= Continental Mark II =

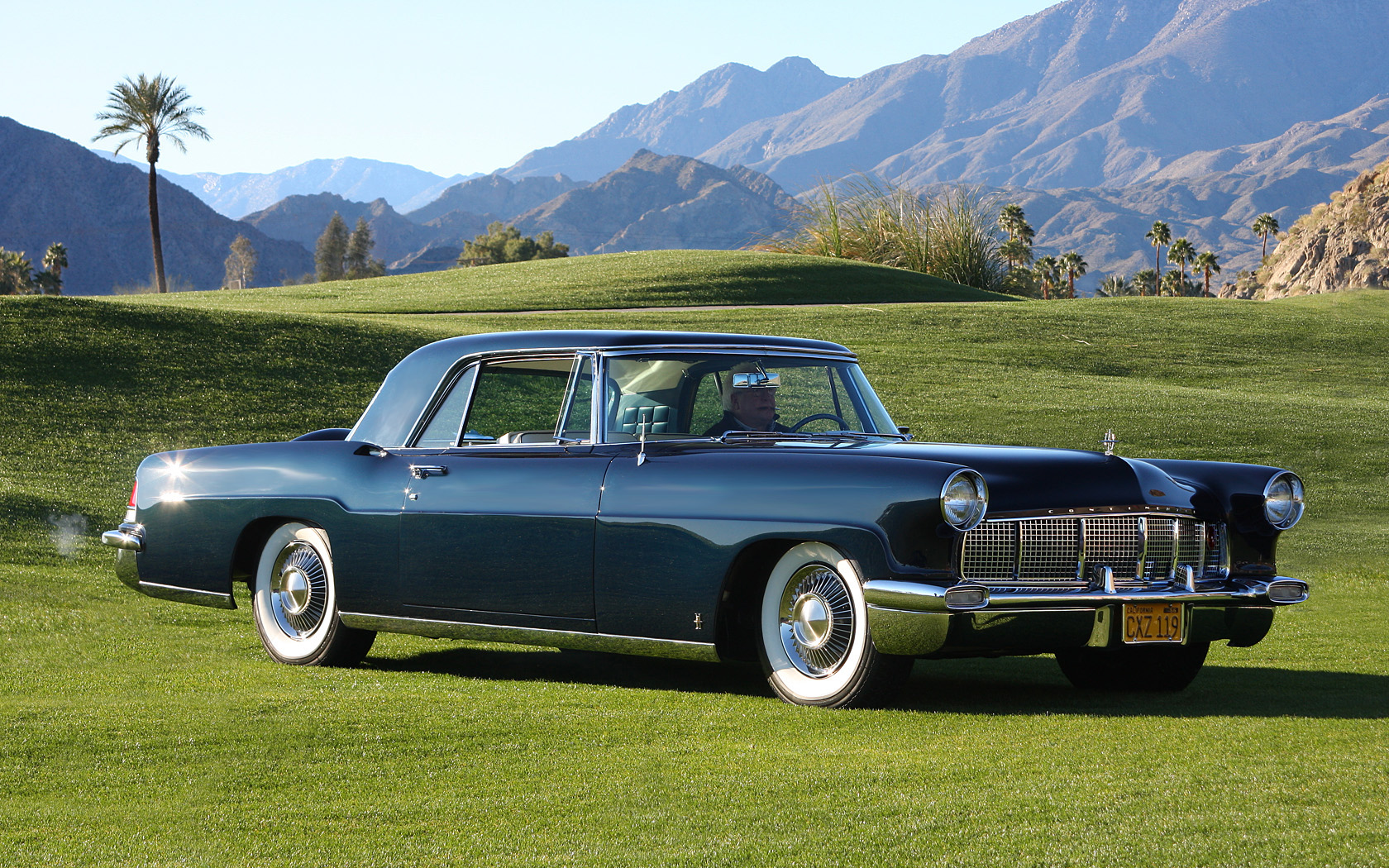
- 1956 Continental Mark II

Overview
- Manufacturer: Continental (Ford)
- Model years: 1956–1957
- Assembly: Allen Park Body and Assembly, Allen Park, Michigan, United States
- Designer: John Reinhart (1953)

Body and chassis
- Body style: 2-door hardtop
- Layout: FR layout
- Related: Lincoln Futura

Powertrain
- Engine: 368 cu in (6.0 L) 4-bbl. Y-block V8
- Transmission: Turbo-Drive 3-speed automatic

Dimensions
- Wheelbase: 126.0 in (3,200 mm)
- Length: 218.4 in (5,547 mm)
- Width: 77.5 in (1,968 mm)
- Height: 56.3 in (1,430 mm)
- Curb weight: 5,000 lb (2,300 kg)

Chronology
- Predecessor: Lincoln Continental (1939–1948)
- Successor: 1958 Continental Mark III; 1969 Continental Mark III

The Continental Mark II is an ultra-luxury coupé that was sold by the Continental Division of Ford for the 1956 and 1957 model years. The first (and only) product line of Continental, the Mark II was developed as the worldwide flagship vehicle of Ford Motor Company. Developed as a successor for the 1939–1948 Lincoln Continental, the Mark II derived its nameplate from European manufacturing practice, denoting a second generation of the model family; Ford would later use this nomenclature for the Mark Series of flagship personal luxury cars.

As the most expensive American-produced automobile of the time, the Mark II was marketed against the Rolls-Royce Silver Cloud and the Bentley Continental. Produced solely as a two-door hardtop coupe, the Mark II was largely hand-assembled, sourcing its V8 powertrain from the standard Lincoln line.

Following the 1957 model year, the Mark II was discontinued, with the hand-built coupe replaced by a rebranded Lincoln. For 1969, Ford revived the Mark series chronology, debuting the (second) Continental Mark III coupe, leading to five successive generations, ending with the 1998 Lincoln Mark VIII coupe. Alongside its nameplate nomenclature, the Mark II debuted the integrated "Continental" spare-tire trunklid (in place of a bumper-mounted spare tire); each generation of the Mark Series (alongside the 1977–1980 Lincoln Versailles and 1982–1987 Lincoln Continental) used a variation of this feature. The Mark II also debuted the rectangular four-point star emblem, which remains in use on Lincoln-brand vehicles (in modified form) today.

The Mark II was assembled by Ford at Allen Park Body and Assembly in Allen Park, Michigan. Following the discontinuation of the Mark II, the facility was converted to the headquarters of the ill-fated Edsel brand. Today, it remains as the Ford Pilot Plant, where Ford pre-production vehicles are hand-assembled for testing and production development.

== Background ==
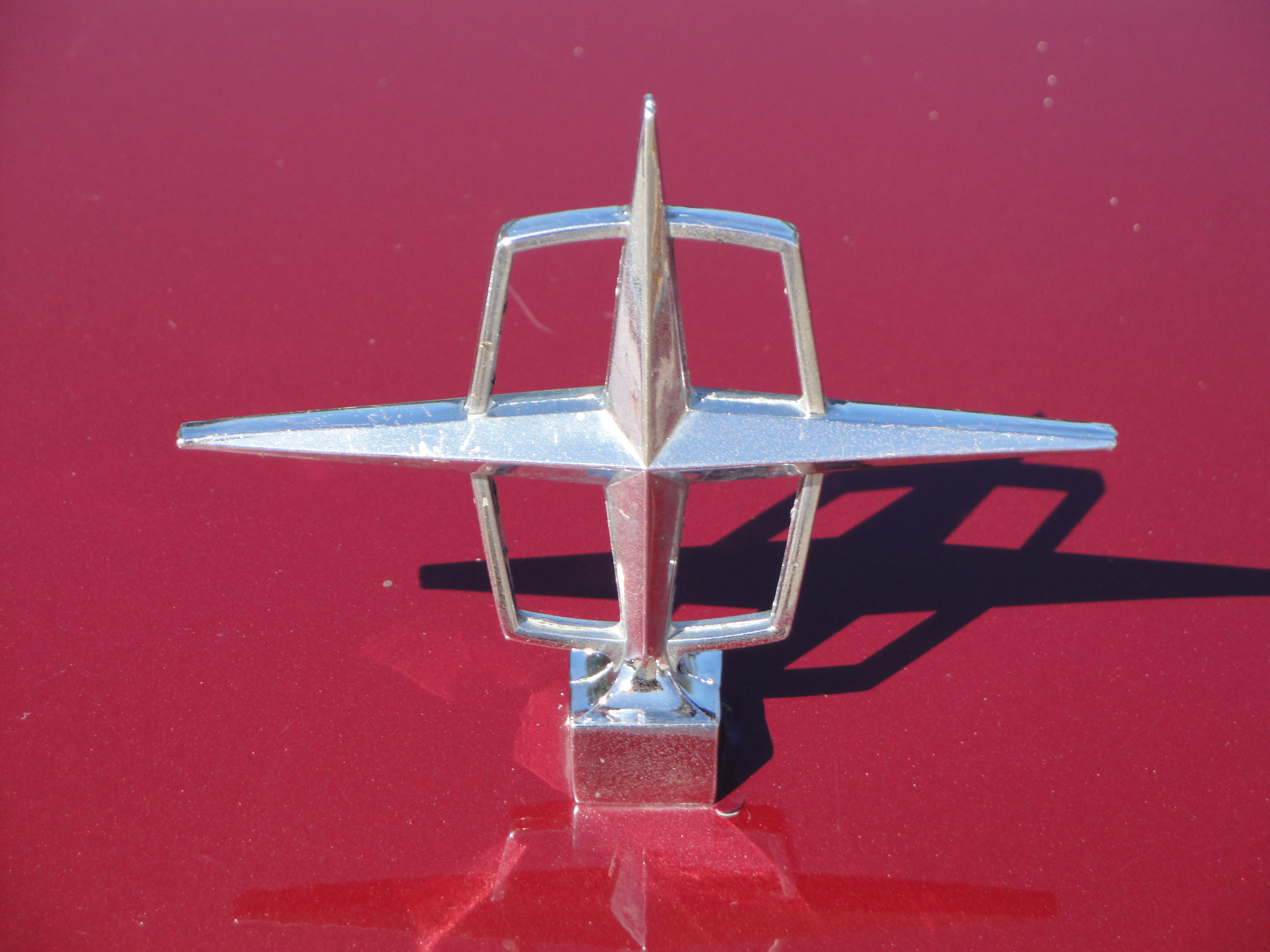
Hood ornament, Continental Mark II

For the 1949 model year, all three divisions of Ford Motor Company unveiled their first post-war product line, with Lincoln discontinuing the Lincoln Continental after six years of production (interrupted by World War II). Following World War II, the Lincoln and Mercury brands had been grouped together within a common division to streamline their operations. While the Lincoln Continental had gone on to build a positive reputation, the Continental was an aging design, as a variant of the 1936 Lincoln-Zephyr.

Following the withdrawal of the 1939–1948 Lincoln Continental, by the early 1950s, interest in a successor vehicle proved sufficient for Ford Motor Company to commence development on a successor. In 1952, the company formed the Special Product Operations team (later Special Products Division). Led by William Clay Ford, the team consisted of John Reinhart (chief stylist), Gordon Buehrig (chief body engineer; designer of the Cord 810), and Harley Copp (chief engineer).

Initially meeting with rejection from upper Ford management, in 1953, design work was approved to bring a successor to the Continental to production. A full-size clay model was approved in June 1953, “subject to minor revisions.” The same year, the two-door luxury segment saw several American-produced vehicles enter production, with the launch of the limited-production Cadillac Eldorado, Buick Skylark, and Oldsmobile 98 Fiesta convertibles by General Motors (coinciding with the launch of the Chevrolet Corvette, as a sports car roadster), the Chrysler C-300 and the Packard Caribbean convertible.

Under William Clay Ford, the Special Products Division set out several objectives. In addition to creating a successor to the 1939–1948 Lincoln Continental, the Continental Mark II was also intended to revive the memory of the 1930s coachbuilt Lincoln Model K, among the flagship American automobiles of the time. In April 1955, the Continental Division was created by Ford Motor Company as a stand-alone division to handle the Continental Mark II. While a two-door hardtop would be offered as the debut vehicle, the model range would expand to a retractable-hardtop convertible and a four-door hardtop sedan.

Ford noted in 1956 that: “At the very beginning of this program, four major design objectives were set forth: 1. The new Continental was to have distinctive styling. The styling was to be based upon clean, classic lines, rather than modernistic innovations. 2. The new car was to include technological advancements and special features which would enhance its value to the customer in terms of comfort, durability, safety, performance, and prestige. 3. The overall height of the car was not to exceed 58 in. 4. There was to be maximum interchangeability of chassis parts with Lincoln, including engine, transmission, rear axle, and suspension.”

While the original Continental coupe sold relatively poorly in contrast to its convertible counterpart, the Special Products Division had set out to introduce a full range of body styles in contrast to the Cadillac Eldorado and Packard Caribbean.

== Model overview ==
Intended as a successor to the Lincoln Continental, effectively making its predecessor a Mark I, the Continental Mark II made its world debut at the Paris Motor Show in October 1955, a year and eight months after the introduction of the smaller two-passenger Ford Thunderbird personal luxury car (roadster). The Mark II debuted in the United States at Ford Motor Company headquarters in Dearborn, Michigan. With a $9,966 base price ($119,778 in 2025 dollars), the Mark II was the most expensive domestic-produced automobile sold in the United States at the time. The only extra cost option offered for the Mark II was a $595 ($7,200 today) air conditioner. Despite its high price, Ford Motor Company estimated it lost nearly $1,000 ($12000 today) for every unit produced.

=== Chassis ===
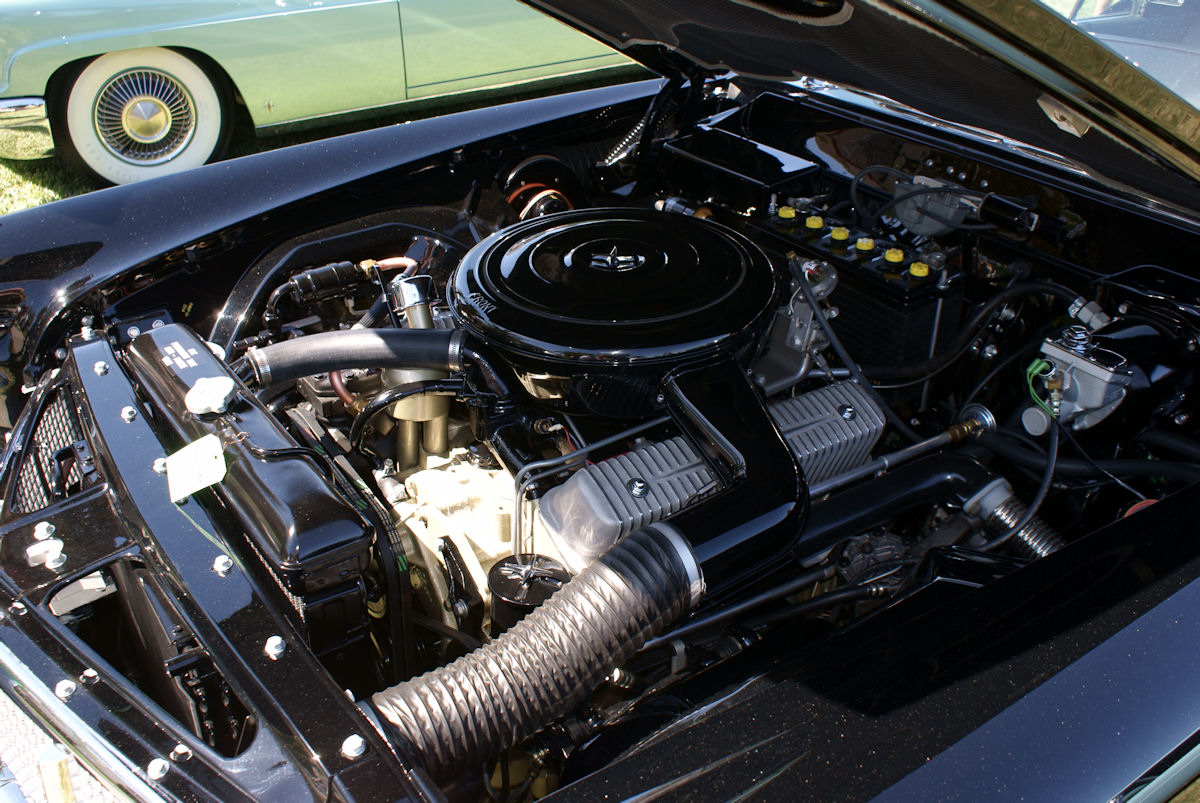
368 cubic-inch Lincoln Y-block V8 (1956 Continental Mark II of Henry Ford II)

The rear-wheel-drive Continental Mark II is constructed using a body-on-frame chassis layout. To lower its body and to optimize the use of dual exhausts, the Mark II uses a Y-shaped frame designed for the model line. A fully boxed crossmember was placed under the front seats, with six tube-style crossmembers located through the rest of the chassis.

While the suspension layout itself was largely adapted from the Lincoln model line, to improve the handling and ride of the 5,000 pound vehicle, the Mark II introduced speed-sensitive shock absorbers for the front wheels.

To streamline production, powertrain components were adapted from the Lincoln model line and checked through the division's quality-control program during production. The 368 cubic-inch Lincoln Y-block V8 powered the Mark II, paired with the 3-speed Turbo-Drive automatic transmission. For 1956, the engines produced 285 hp, increased to 300 hp for 1957. For a distinctive appearance, the engine had unique finned, cast-aluminum valve covers. Because the engine sat lower than in the Lincoln—and at a different driveline angle—a special oil pan was necessary “to provide the required volume of oil for extremely steep grades.” In a 1956 report from Popular Mechanics, the Mark ll produced 16.7 mpg at 50 mph.

Continental Mark II powertrain details
Engine	Production	Configuration	Output		Fuel system	Transmission
Lincoln Y-block V8	1956–1957	368 cu in (6.0 L) 16-valve OHV V8	285 hp	402 lb-ft	4-bbl carburetor	Lincoln/Borg-Warner Turbo-Drive 3-speed automatic
Lincoln Y-block V8	1956–1957	368 cu in (6.0 L) 16-valve OHV V8	300 hp	415 lb-ft	4-bbl carburetor	Lincoln/Borg-Warner Turbo-Drive 3-speed automatic

=== Body ===
While Continental was planned as a three-model range, the Mark II two-door hardtop coupe was the sole model to reach production. Sharing its 126-wheelbase with the Lincoln model line, the Mark II was over four inches shorter, two inches narrower, and over three inches lower than the Lincoln Premiere and Capri. In an extensive contrast to other American luxury cars, the body of the Mark II was conservatively styled, with chrome limited to the bumpers, grille, rocker panels, and window trim. Few curves were added to the body, with the exception of a body accent line on the fenders and doors.

In a notable departure from both American and European styling precedents, neither tailfins nor pontoon fenders were seen; a swing-away left taillamp hid the fuel cap from view. To update the Continental tire styling feature, Ford engineers moved the vertical tire inside the trunk; as the spare tire was still vertically mounted, the "tire bulge" design was introduced in order to allow for the trunklid to close.

While Continental was intended largely as a luxury vehicle, interior elements of the Mark II were intended to make the vehicle more personal than a typical American luxury vehicle. Central to the interior design was the wraparound windshield (mounted 8 inches further rearward than in a Lincoln). In contrast to Lincoln and Mercury vehicles of the time, the Continental Mark II was given a vertically angled steering wheel (with a full set of gauges grouped behind the steering wheel).

The Continental Mark II would have an extensive list of standard equipment for the time, equipped with power steering, power brakes, power windows, power seats, power vent windows, and full instrumentation, including a tachometer and a low-level fuel warning. In total, the Mark II was offered with nineteen standard exterior colors and 43 interior design schemes (with five interior fabrics). In a break from other luxury products offered by competitors, two-tone paint combinations were not available, while privately the customer could be accommodated if the appearance was desired.

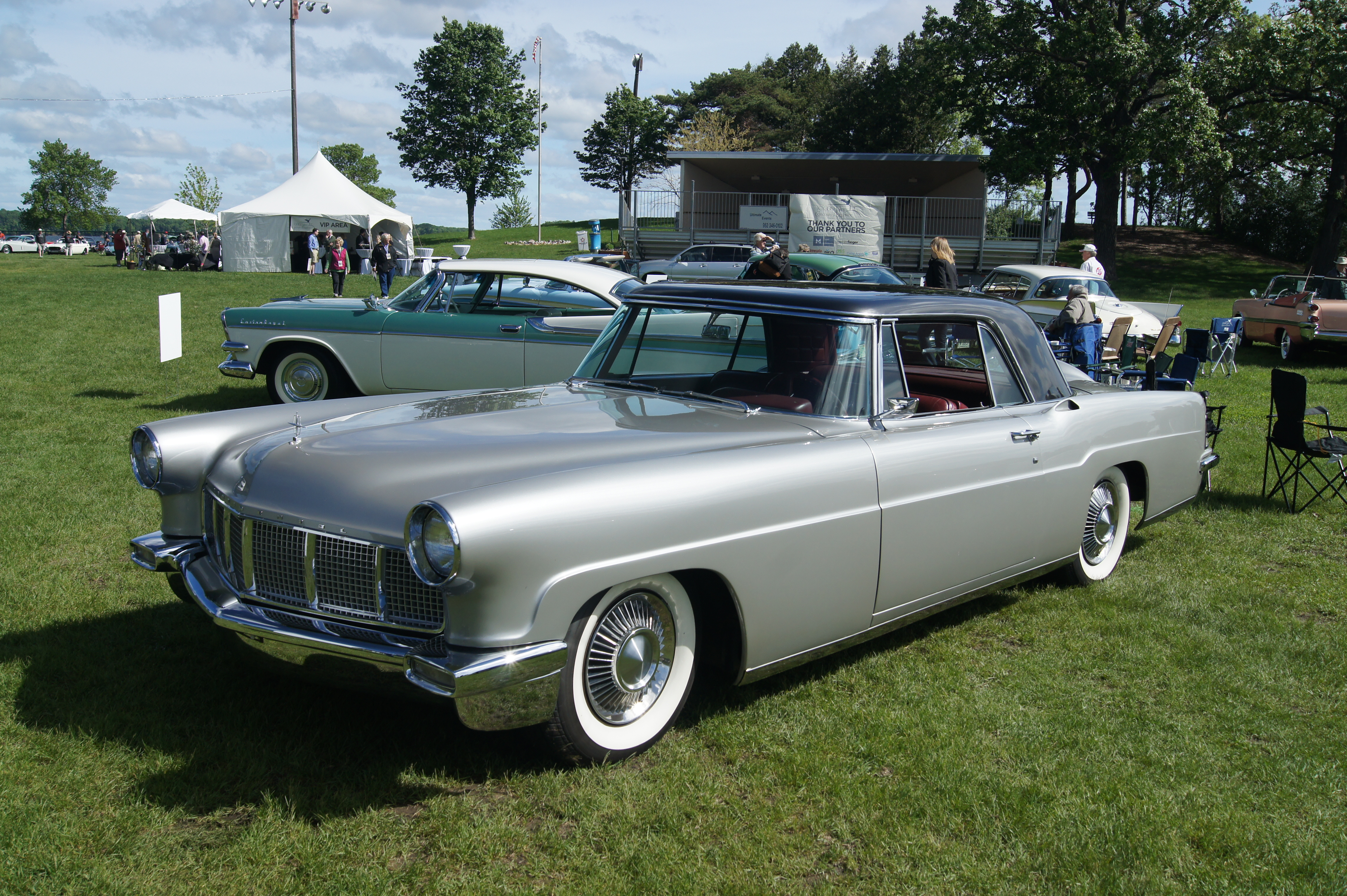
1956 Continental Mark II

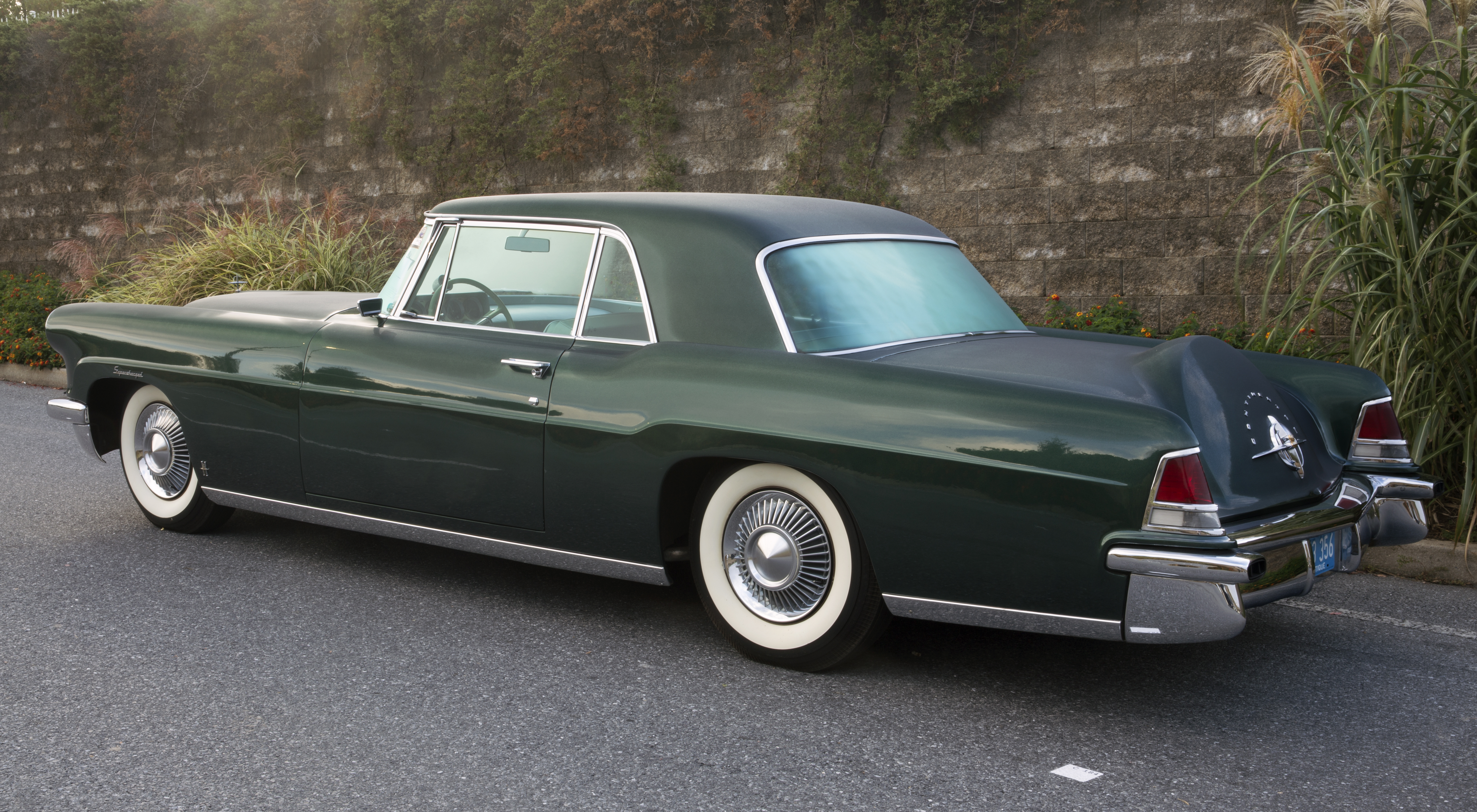
1956 Continental Mark II, rear view

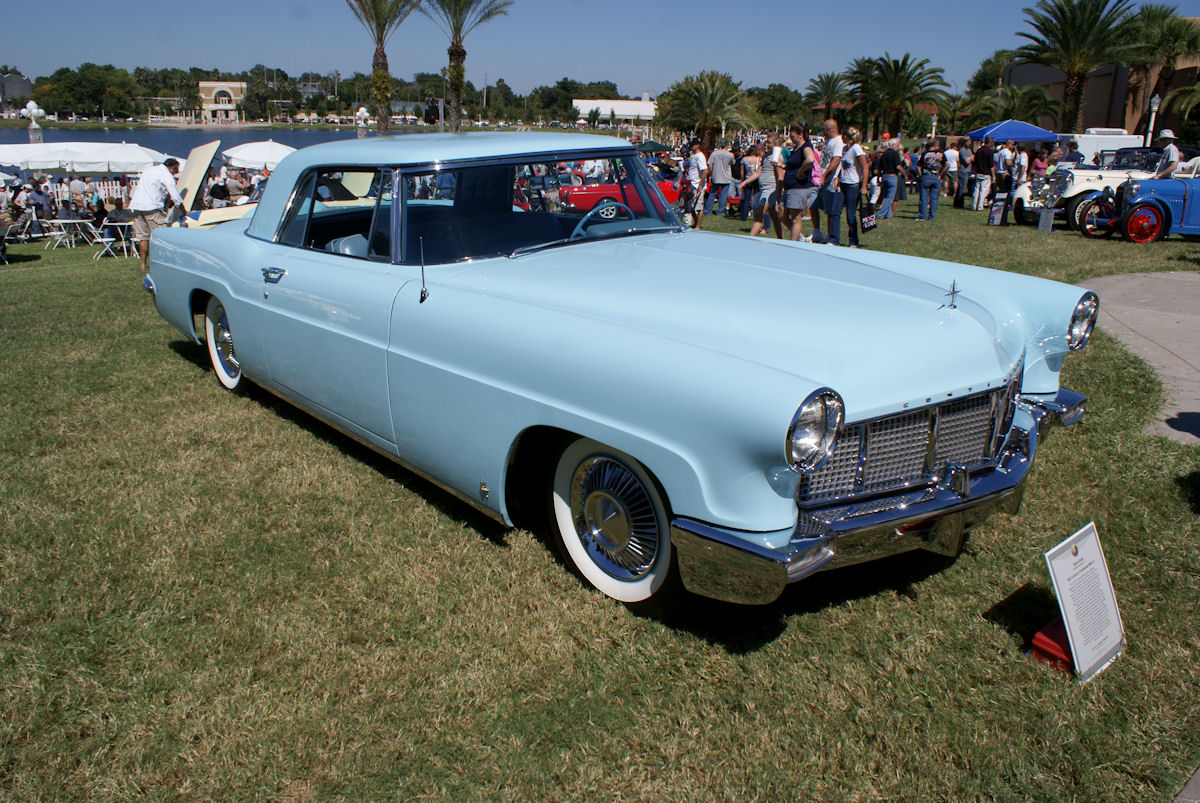
1957 Continental Mark II

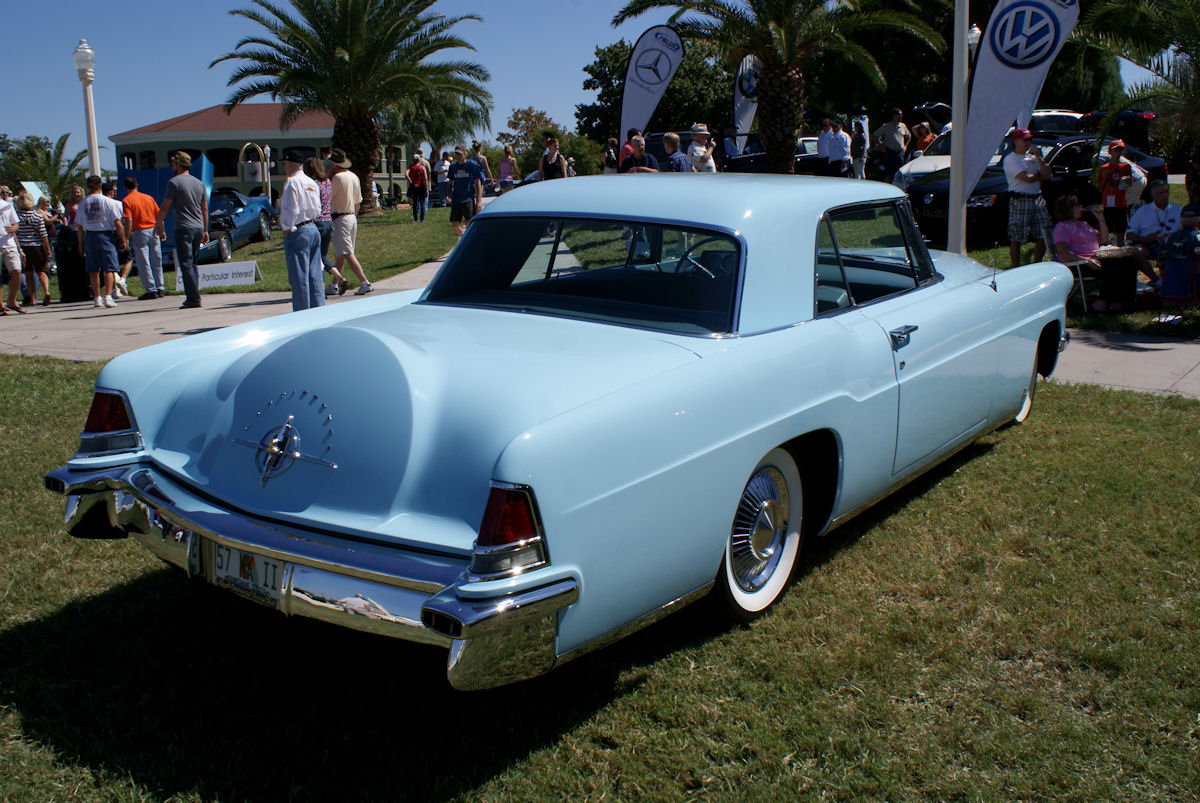
1957 Continental Mark II, rear view

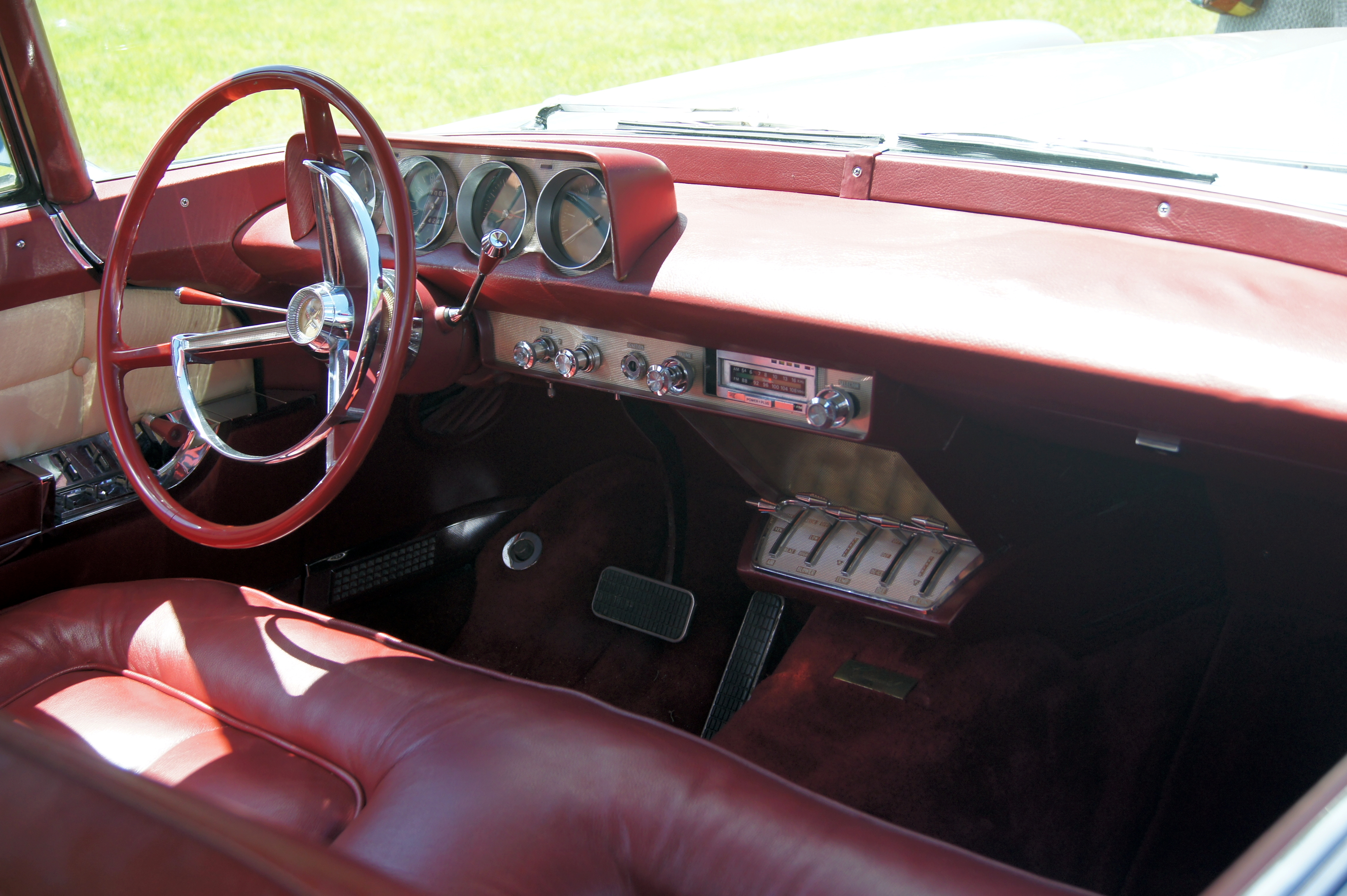
Interior view

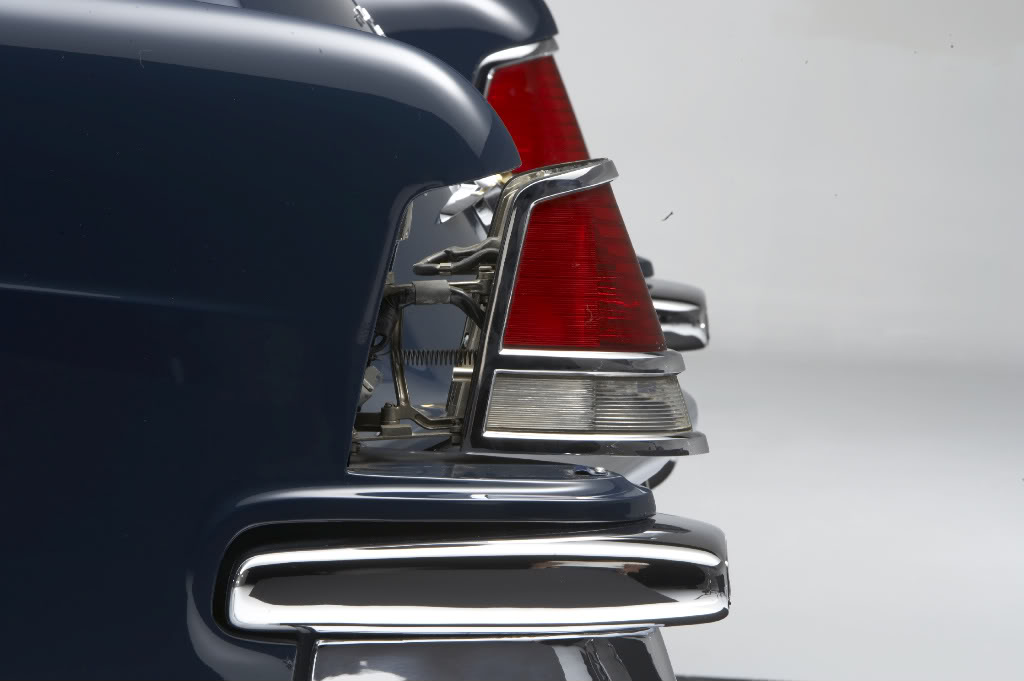
Left taillamp, which conceals fuel fill

=== Quality control ===
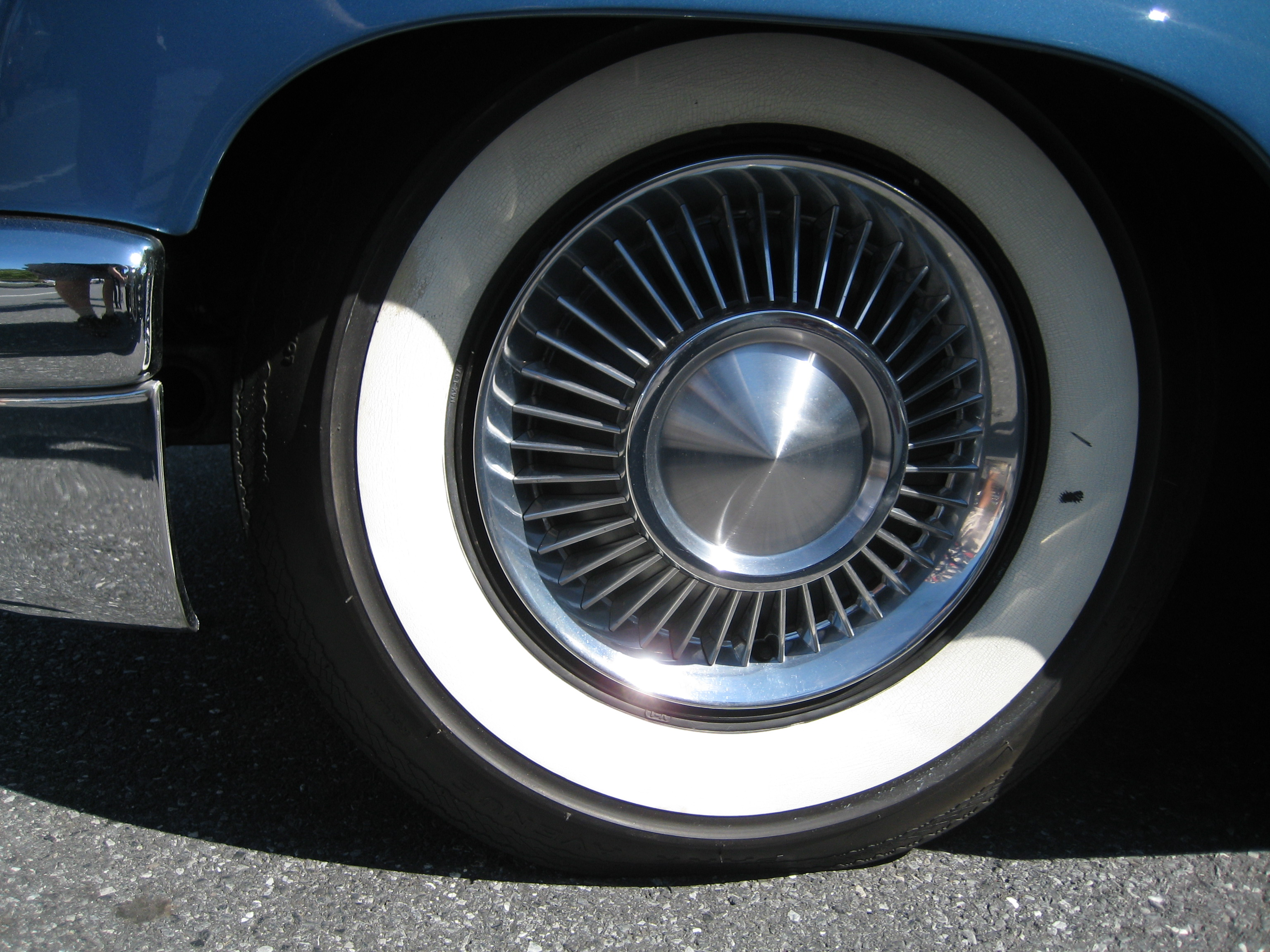
Detail of wheel cover (assembled by hand)

In place of style or outright performance, to justify its exclusive price, Ford Motor Company sought to market the Continental model line as the highest-quality American automobile; in line with the coachbuilt cars of the 1930s, the Mark II was largely hand-built. While sharing its design with the standard Lincoln model line, each Continental Mark II engine was effectively factory-blueprinted; after selection from the Lincoln assembly line, the engine was disassembled and reassembled after numerous quality-control and performance inspections. Each of the four wheel covers was hand-assembled with individually fastened vanes; each letter of "Continental" was individually bolted onto the trunklid.

As American leather was sprayed vs vat dyed, Bridge of Weir leather (imported from Scotland) was used throughout the interior; as Continental felt the results were better-wearing, the leather used the Vat dye process and was dyed in the United States. While metallic-style exterior paints had become popular on 1950s American luxury cars, durability concerns forced Continental to adapt lacquer-based paint colors (the first Ford Motor Company vehicle to do so).

During the development of the Continental division by Ford Special Products, Ford Motor Company sought to develop the most stringent quality control programs ever seen in the American automotive industry, coming up with seven major initiatives for Continental. The quality control program included all employees at the assembly facility, from assembly workers to upper management. In one instance, a transporter truck of Mark IIs was returned to the factory as a gate security guard noticed a paint defect on one vehicle.

Continental Mark II Quality Control Program
Initiative	Description
Quality Specifications	Continental vehicles are only allowed to use the highest-quality materials (resulting in a number of suppliers having to upgrade their own production standards).
Initial Sample Inspection	To ensure all parts met standards, all inspections were deliberately scheduled earlier than normal to allow the process to slow down to allow for potential rejections to take place.
Receiving Inspection	In place of samples being inspected for the first time at the assembly plant, 100% of parts are inspected by suppliers, with the factory becoming a secondary inspection.
Additional Manufacturing Attention	Continental allowed for twice as long to assemble a vehicle as Ford or Lincoln-Mercury. The extra time expected workers to test-fit parts before assembly, check and correct defects.
In-Plant Inspection and Testing	Inside the Continental assembly plant, each vehicle went through fourteen major inspection points, where each vehicle was inspected by a team of mechanics before undergoing further assembly. After completing assembly, each vehicle underwent a further inspection and a road test before shipping.
Top Management Action	Management of Continental reviewed statistical information from the quality control department, comparing it to customer issues and repair claims
Field Service	Program to remedy customer issues; also used to check on customer satisfaction

== Branding ==
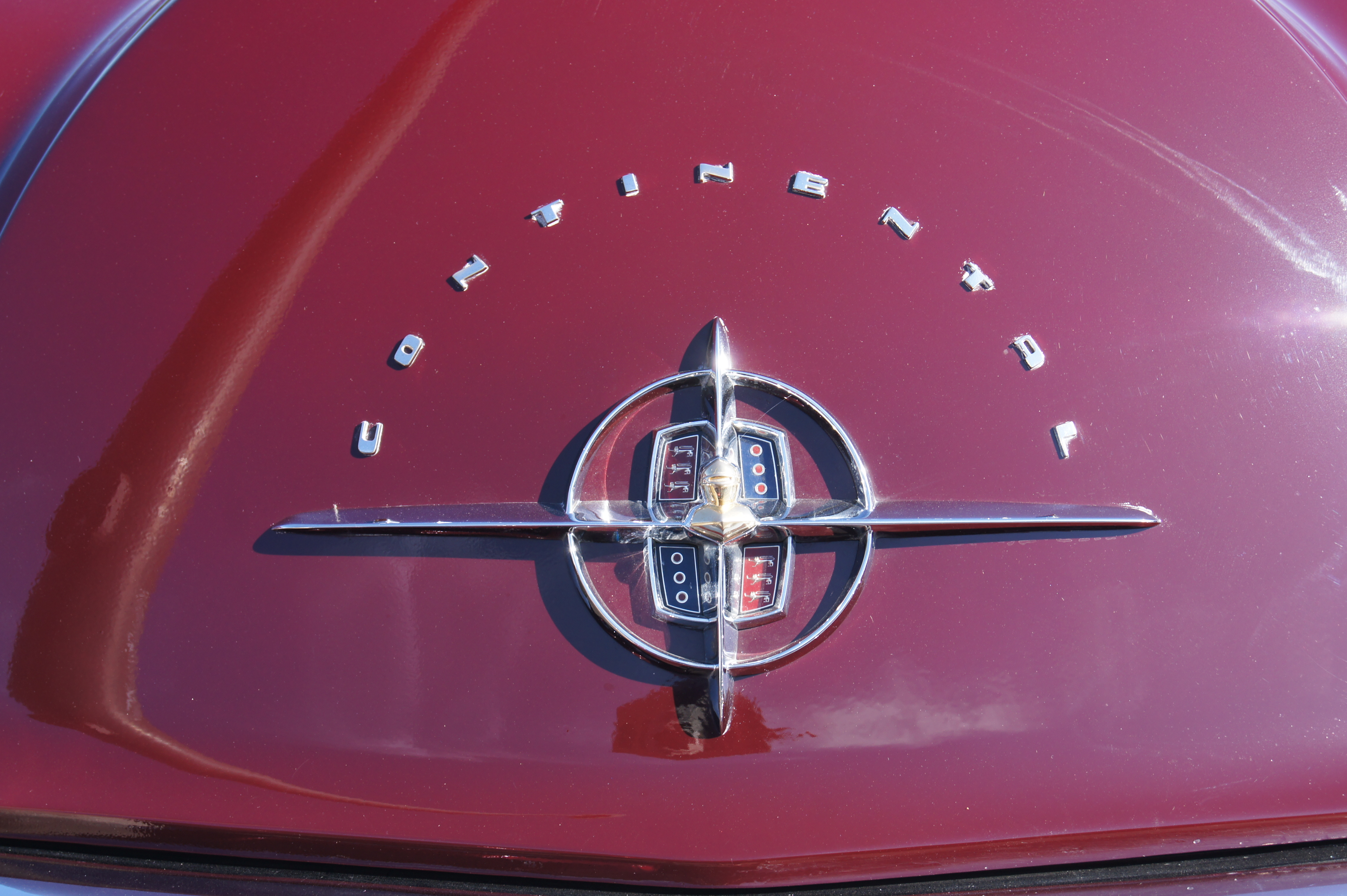
Trunklid emblem, 1957 Continental Mark II

Developed as the successor to the first-generation Lincoln Continental, the branding of the Continental Mark II has been a source of confusion. Though the Continental Division was a stand-alone division (with a dedicated manufacturing facility), its product line was marketed and serviced through the Lincoln-Mercury dealer network (as Continentals shared mechanical commonality with Lincolns).

In July 1956, Ford closed the Continental Division, integrating Continental into Lincoln.

=== Post Mark II ===
For 1958, the Continental branding underwent further confusion. Though Continental no longer existed as a stand-alone division, the branding was used for a new car, as Ford introduced the Continental Mark III. Developed under a mandate to reduce its price to $6,000 (more competitive with Cadillac Sixty Specials and Imperial LeBarons). One of the largest cars ever built by Ford Motor Company, the Mark III was forced to abandon hand assembly, now built alongside the Lincoln Premiere; the model line was distinguished by its reverse-slant rear-window roofline (on all bodystyles, including convertibles).

For 1959, the Mark III became the Mark IV, though receiving only minor model-year changes. For 1960, Ford introduced the Lincoln Continental Mark V, temporarily ending the use of the stand-alone Continental name.

For 1961 production, Ford condensed the Lincoln brand solely to a single Lincoln Continental nameplate, dropping any generational nomenclature. With the exception of the 1977–1980 Lincoln Versailles, Continental was the exclusive nameplate used by Lincoln until the 1981 rebranding of full-size Lincolns as the Lincoln Town Car.

=== Mark Series revival ===
For the 1969 model year, Ford Motor Company introduced the Continental Mark III flagship personal luxury car. Though the nameplate had been used in 1958, the design was developed as a contemporary successor of the Mark II, effectively removing the 1958-1960 generation retroactively from the Mark Series.

Far less expensive than the Mark II, the Mark III was derived from the Ford Thunderbird, sharing its chassis and wheelbase. One of the most advanced American vehicles of the time, the Mark III was fitted with full power equipment, full instrumentation, air conditioning, and was one of the first vehicles offered with an optional sunroof and anti-lock brakes. Many features of the exterior design of the Mark III was adopted by the Lincoln Continental for 1970, influencing Lincoln design through the end of the decade.

Through the 1970s, Ford followed the Mark III with the 1972 Mark IV and the 1977 Mark V; the latter two generations are derived from the 1972 Ford Thunderbird chassis.

=== Rivalry with Eldorado ===
==== Eldorado Brougham vs. Mark II (1957-1960) ====
In response to the Continental Mark II, General Motors released the Cadillac Eldorado Brougham four-door hardtop. Taking over the lead for most-expensive American car, the Eldorado Brougham cost US$13,074 ($149,871 in 2025 dollars), over $3,000 more than the Mark II. The first four-door Eldorado, the Brougham was fitted with rear-hinged coach doors, a stainless-steel roof, additional lower chrome body trim, and four front headlights. One of the most sophisticated cars of its time, the Eldorado Brougham was fitted with self leveling air suspension, cruise control, automatic parking brake, power windows and door locks, and power trunk release and antenna.

A second-generation Eldorado Brougham was produced from 1959 to 1960; styled by GM, the limited-production $13,075 model was assembled in Italy by Pininfarina. More conservatively styled than its predecessor, the second-generation Eldorado Brougham previewed many design features introduced on early 1960s Cadillacs (including smaller tailfins). In contrast to its predecessor, the new generation shared greater commonality with the standard Eldorado, though air conditioning, automatic high beams, and cruise control remained.

==== Eldorado vs. Mark Series (1967–1998) ====
For 1967, GM redesigned the Cadillac Eldorado; while remaining the flagship two-door Cadillac, it was repackaged as a personal luxury car, sharing a front-wheel drive chassis with the Oldsmobile Toronado. Following the 1969 debut of the Mark III, Ford and General Motors established an informal brand rivalry between their company flagship luxury vehicles (similar to the Ford Mustang and Chevrolet Camaro). Through the 1998 withdrawal of the Lincoln Mark VIII, both the Eldorado and various generations of the Mark Series competed directly against one another in the marketplace (with the exception of the 1980–1983 Continental Mark VI).

Motor Trend reviewed various generations of both model lines against one another in a "King of the Hill" series through the 1970s and 1980s.

=== End of Continental brand ===
For 1986, Ford took a definitive stance over the Continental brand name; after existing as a sub-marque sold through Lincoln-Mercury for 18 years, the Continental Mark Series was officially rebranded as a Lincoln model line. The Continental Mark VII became the Lincoln Mark VII, adopting Lincoln badging and a Lincoln VIN designation.

== Production and sales ==
The Continental Mark II was produced at the Allen Park Body & Assembly facility in Allen Park, Michigan. Established as the headquarters and assembly plant for Continental, in a major break from Ford tradition, a moving assembly line was largely dispensed with to facilitate hand-built construction and inspection. In the factory, each vehicle was assembled on a mobile carrier; as each segment of assembly and inspection was completed, vehicles were moved by hand to different assembly stations. Following the 1957 withdrawal of the Mark II, the facility was repurposed, becoming the headquarters of Edsel. Today, the facility is used as the Ford Vehicle Operations General Office and New Model Programs Development Center, used to develop new vehicles and their manufacturing.

In total, 3,005 Continental Mark IIs were produced. This number includes three prototypes and 13 pre-production vehicles. Serial numbers for Mark IIs ran from 975 to 3989; numbers 986 to 998 were unused. The first regular production car was number 1001. The three prototype cars were numbered 500, 501, and 502F. The first two were scrapped in June 1956, and the third car survives today.

While a convertible never reached production, two 1956 Mark IIs were converted to convertibles on an official basis. One was converted by Hess & Eisenhardt (no. 1126), while another was converted by Derham Body Company (no. 3190). The latter car was given to the wife of William Clay Ford as a personal vehicle; initially painted white, it was later painted sky blue.

Many Mark IIs were purchased new by wealthy and prominent figures. These included Barry Goldwater (no. 2804), Dwight Eisenhower (no. 3411), Frank Sinatra (no. 1884), Elvis Presley (no. 3286), and Liz Taylor (no. 3196).

== Appearances in media ==
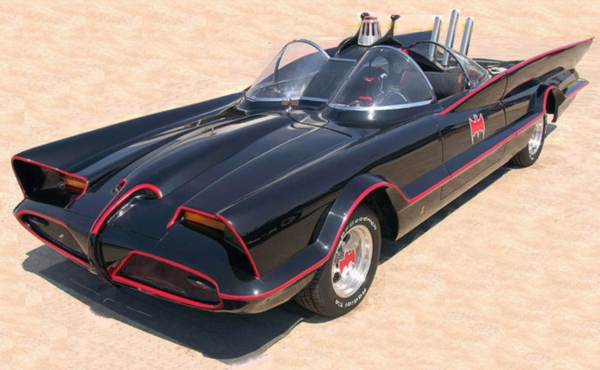
Batmobile (1966)

The Continental Mark II was featured in the 1956 film High Society, starring Frank Sinatra, Bing Crosby, Grace Kelly, and Louis Armstrong.

After its sale to George Barris, the 1955 Lincoln Futura concept car (which used a Mark II chassis and powertrain) was converted to become the Batmobile for the namesake 1960s TV series.

== Legacy ==
While the Mark II two-door hardtop was the exclusive model line produced by Continental, several elements of the Mark II would live on in other Ford Motor Company vehicles. While the Continental retractable hardtop never saw production, the top mechanism would be utilized in the 1957–1959 Ford Skyliner; the mechanism also would see use by the 1961–1967 Lincoln Continental and the 1958–1966 Ford Thunderbird.

As part of the Lincoln brand history, the Continental Mark II is the beginning of the Mark series (with two successors in its model history), introducing the integrated "Continental tire". The four-point star emblem of Lincoln debuted on the Mark II and has remained in use on Lincoln vehicles since 1958.

Today, approximately half of the original circa 3,000 cars still exist in various states of repair; an active Mark II Forum exists.

== See also ==
- Lincoln Mark series
