= Lincoln Continental Mark III =

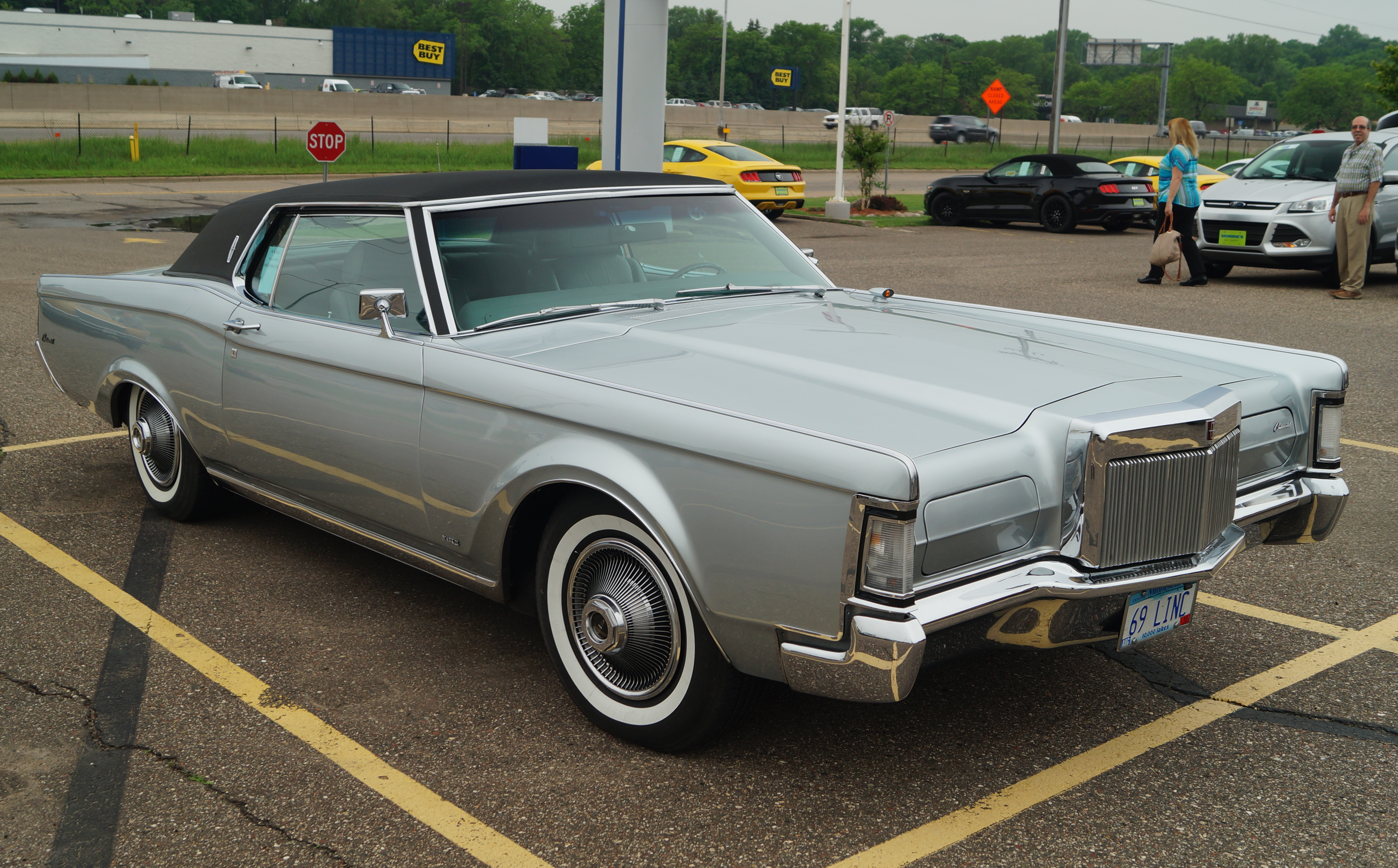
- 1969 Continental Mark III

Overview
- Manufacturer: Lincoln (Ford)
- Production: 1968–1971
- Model years: 1969–1971
- Assembly: United States: Wixom, Michigan (Wixom Assembly)

Body and chassis
- Class: Personal luxury car
- Body style: 2-door coupe
- Layout: FR layout
- Related: Ford Thunderbird (fifth generation); Lincoln Continental (1961–1969)

Powertrain
- Engine: 460 cu in (7.5 L) V8 (385 family)
- Transmission: 3-speed C6 automatic

Dimensions
- Wheelbase: 117.2 in (2,977 mm)
- Length: 216.1 in (5,489 mm)
- Width: 79.4 in (2,017 mm)
- Height: 53.0 in (1,346 mm)
- Curb weight: 4,866 lb (2,207 kg)

Chronology
- Predecessor: Continental Mark II
- Successor: Continental Mark IV

The Continental Mark III is a personal luxury car marketed by Lincoln from the 1969–1971 model years. The namesake successor of the 1956–1957 Continental Mark II, the Mark III likewise served as the flagship vehicle of Ford Motor Company. Offered as a two-door hardtop coupe, the Mark III was noted for its hidden headlights, Continental spare recalling the Mark II and its Rolls-Royce styled grille.

The Mark III was developed as a direct competitor to the Cadillac Eldorado, creating a three-decade market rivalry between it and the Continental Mark series.

To avoid the exceptionally high development and production costs of its largely hand-built, extremely low-volume predecessor, the Mark III shared its chassis with the four door Ford Thunderbird. Model-specific design elements, including its hidden headlamps and large chrome grille distinguished the two — while sharing the same roof structure and rear windows, retractable into the C pillar, of the two door Thunderbird. Later models featured genuine walnut interior accents and a Cartier-branded clock. In a first for an American car, the 1970 Mark III was fitted with Michelin "X" Radial Tires as standard equipment.

Ford manufactured the Mark III at its Wixom Assembly Plant facility in Michigan alongside the Thunderbird and the Lincoln Continental. For 1972, in alignment with a Thunderbird redesign, the Mark III was superseded by the Continental Mark IV.

== History ==
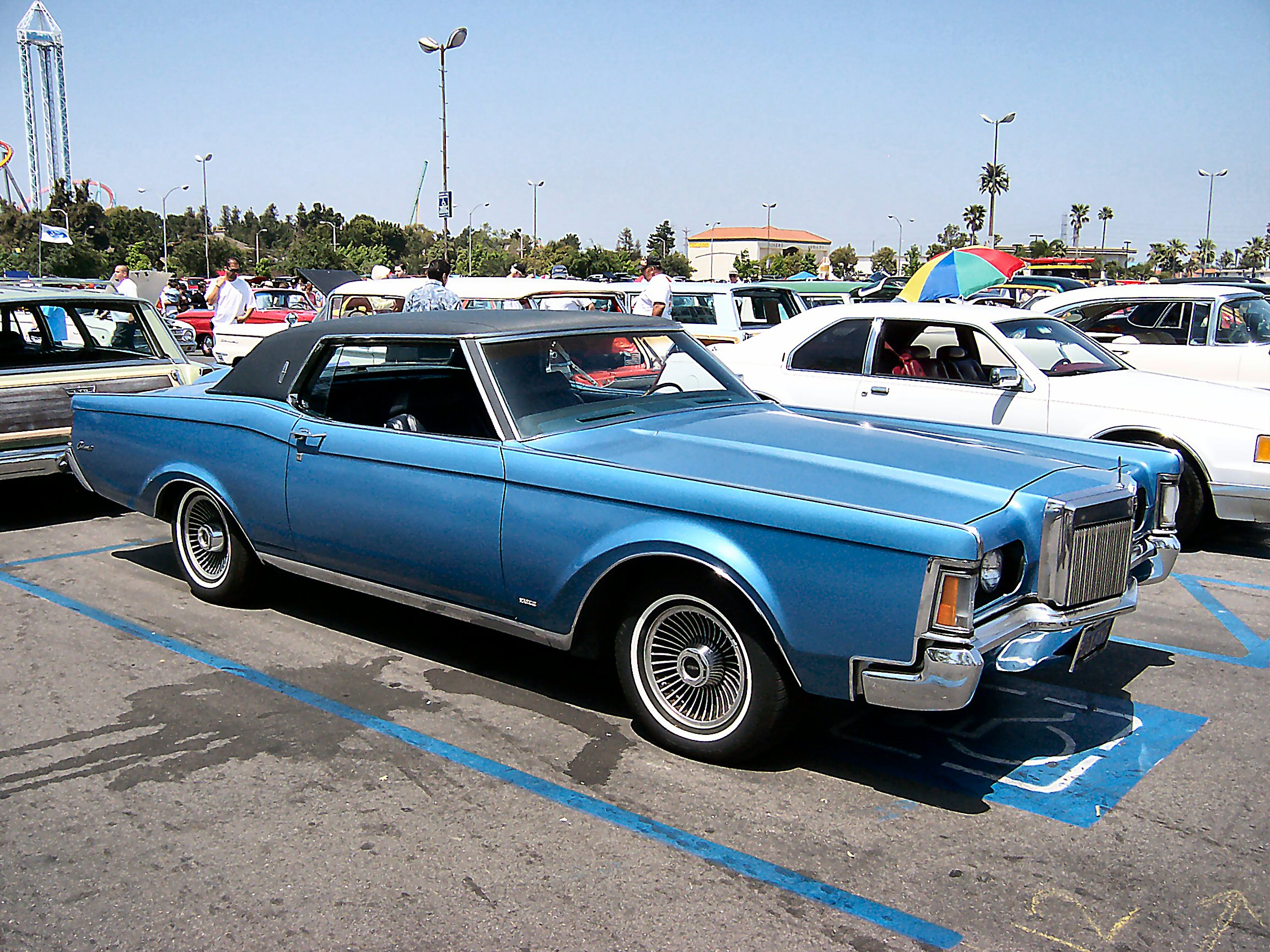
1970 Continental Mark III

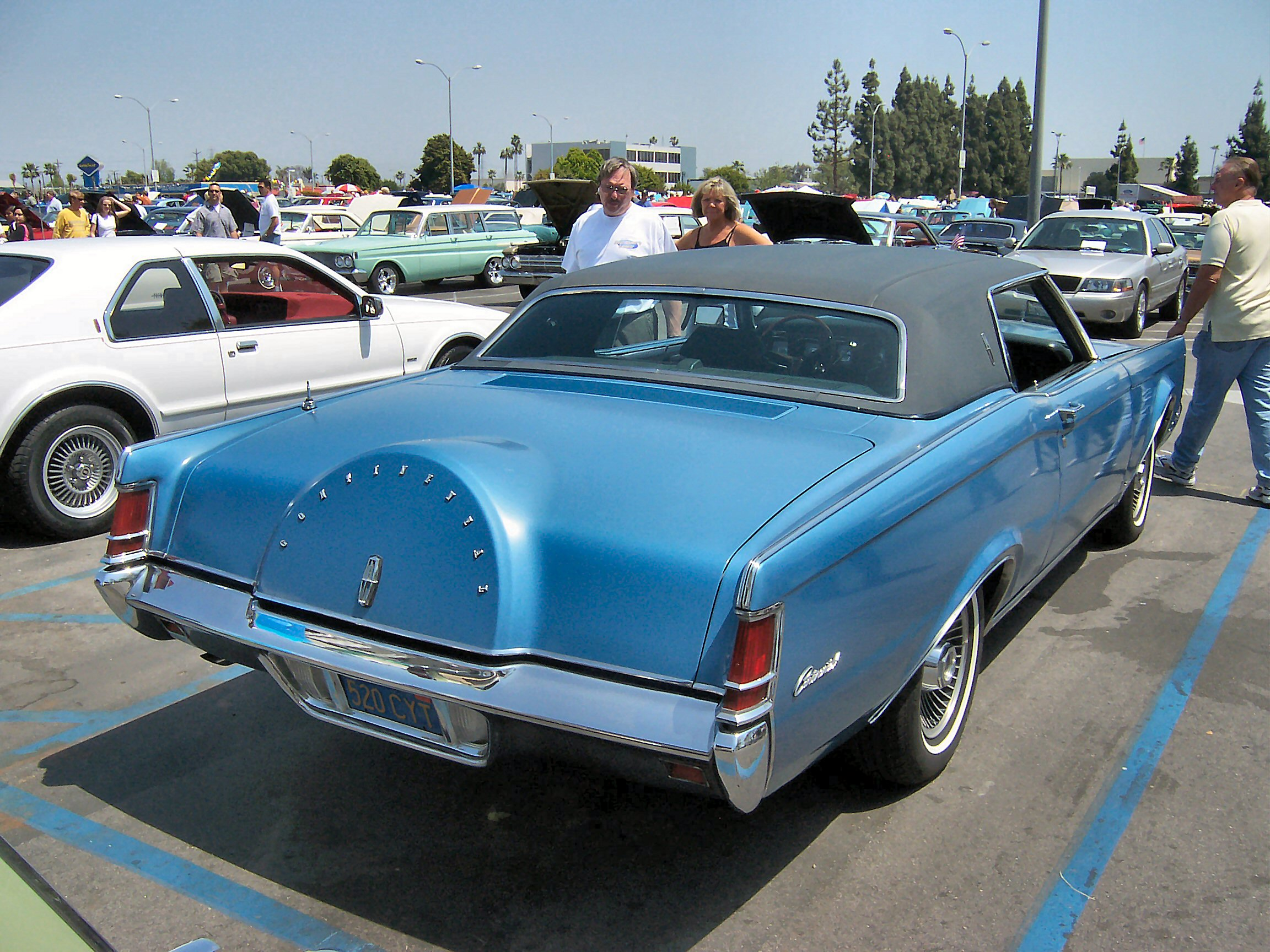
1970 Continental Mark III

The Continental Mark III was the brainchild of Lee Iacocca, Ford's vice-president, car and truck group in 1965, who directed Design Vice President, Gene Bordinat, to "put a Rolls-Royce grille on a Thunderbird" that September. Development was assigned by Iacocca to the new "Strawberry Studio"- a special development preproduction team led by Bordinat. The Mark III was based on the fourth generation Lincoln Continental (1961–1969) and the four-door fifth generation Thunderbird introduced for 1967. With the Thunderbird "dying in the marketplace" Iacocca wanted to put the company's development investment to better use by expanding its platform over several models. The final design of the Mark III was introduced to a Lincoln-Mercury Focus Group in mid January 1966- receiving an overwhelmingly negative response from the group. Despite this feedback, both Iacocca and Henry Ford II loved the design and overruled objections. On March 24, 1966, the Mark III was given the green light for production.

The Mark III was intended to compete head-to-head with the top of the domestic personal luxury car market, Cadillac's then rear wheel drive seventh generation Eldorado. This placed it above the second-tier premium personal luxury cars such as the Ford Thunderbird, Buick Riviera, Oldsmobile Toronado and Chrysler New Yorker coupe. As the Eldorado was built upon the Toronado frame, the Mark III was based on the Thunderbird's. While the side-rail frame was identical to the Thunderbird's, the Mark III bore almost 300 lb (140 kg) more bodywork. Power was adequate from Lincoln's Ford 385 engine-based 460 cu in (7.5 L) 365 bhp (272 kW) "gross horsepower" V8.

The Mark III was unveiled at the 1968 running of the 12 Hours of Sebring on March 23, 1968, as an early 1969 model. The model was a significant financial success because it combined the high unit revenue of a luxury model with the low development costs and fixed cost–amortizing utility of platform-sharing with a less-expensive, downscale car, in a vehicle that was appealing enough to buyers that many units were sold. Iacocca said, "We brought out the Mark III in April 1968, and in its very first year it outsold the Cadillac Eldorado, which had been our long-range goal. For the next five years [Marks III and IV] we had a field day, in part because the car had been developed on the cheap. We did the whole thing for $30 million, a bargain-basement price because we were able to use existing parts and designs." Iacocca explained that this transformed the Lincoln-Mercury Division from losing money on every luxury car (via low unit sales on high fixed costs) to a profit center, making the new Mark series as big a success as any he ever had in his career—a remarkable statement from an executive who led the programs for the original Ford Mustang and the Chrysler minivan family. Iacocca explained of the Mark series, "The Mark is [in 1984] Ford's biggest moneymaker, just as Cadillac is for General Motors. It's the Alfred Sloan theory: you have to have something for everybody [...] you always need a poor man's car [...] but then you need upscale cars, too, because you never know when the blue-collar guy is going to be laid off. It seems that in the United States the one thing you can count on is that even during a depression, the rich get richer. So you always have to have some goodies for them."

Even though it was fundamentally a stretched, upscaled Thunderbird, the 1969 Continental Mark III traded on being a spiritual successor to the limited-production, hand-built, ultra-luxurious Continental Mark II produced by the short-lived Continental Division of the Ford Motor Company between 1956 and 1957. As such, it was branded and marketed only as a "Continental" within the Lincoln-Mercury Division structure - regardless that Lincoln was already selling a model called the "Lincoln Continental" - and the Lincoln name did not appear on the vehicle, VIN plate, factory paperwork, window sticker, nor official Ford Motor Company brochures and advertising. Moreover, the Continental Mark III designation had already been used on the 1958 Continental Mark III.

Nevertheless, the new Lincoln-Mercury Division-produced Continental Mark III was sold alongside the separate but distinct Lincoln-Mercury Division-affiliated and produced Lincoln Continental line of sedans. This created branding confusion during the entire production run of the Continental Mark series until the 1986 model year, when Continental was dropped as the make and the Mark VII was rebranded as a Lincoln with VINs adjusted accordingly.

The 1969 Mark III was built at the enlarged facility at the Wixom, Michigan assembly plant, home to the rest of the Mk III series and subsequent generations of the model. The listed retail price was US$6,741 ($59,183 in 2025 dollars) and 30,858 were manufactured.

== Production figures ==
Lincoln Continental Mark III Production Figures
Production Year	Yearly Total
1968	7,770
1969	23,088
1970	21,432
1971	27,091
Total	79,381

== Equipment ==
Standard equipment included power steering, brakes, windows, vacuum-activated concealed headlamps, and split bench electrically adjustable front seats, with 2-way power standard and 6-way power with or without the optional passenger seat recliner as an option. Full instrumentation was standard, with simulated wood appliques in either English Oak or East-Indian Rosewood on the instrument panel and door trim panels on 1969 models. For 1970–71, genuine walnut was used for the interior wood accents. After a few months, a Cartier-branded clock became standard equipment. The upholstery was either the standard vinyl with cloth inserts or the optional leather [and over the years, both low back and high back front seats were available.]

A vinyl roof in cavalry twill pattern was optional on 1969 models, but examples without the vinyl roof were rare. One reason for the rarity of the plain-roofed version is the fact that the roof was made in two pieces and required extra preparation at the factory to conceal the seam; consequently, its availability was not widely advertised. Other options included the aforementioned leather interior, air conditioning, further power adjustments for the front seats, a variety of radios and 8-track tape players, tinted glass, and power locks. A limited-slip differential could be ordered, as could anti-lock brakes, called "Sure Trak". From 1969 on an ASC sunroof, debuted on the 1968 Mercury Cougar, was optional. Cruise control and an headlamp control that automatically dimmed the headlights for oncoming cars were both optional.

== 1969 ==
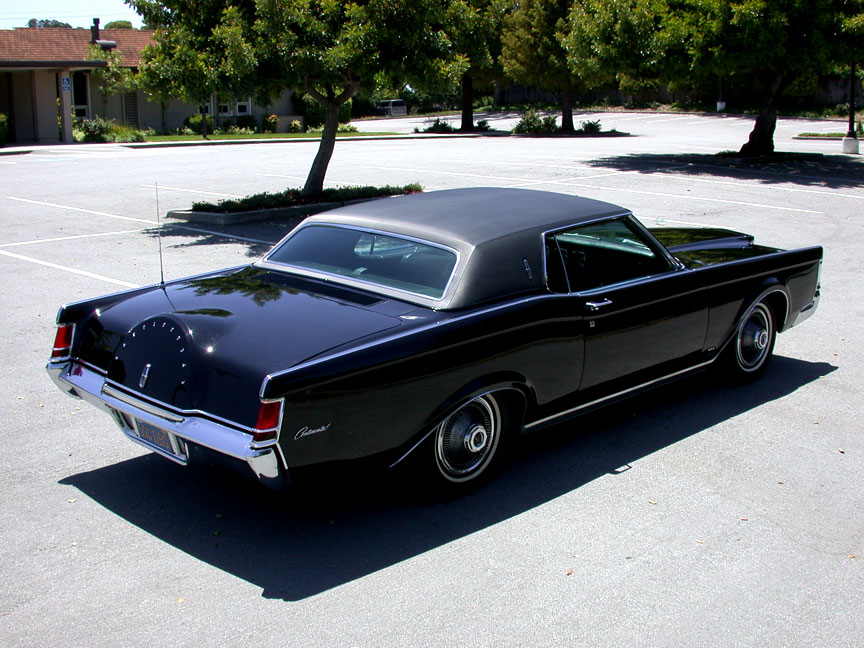
1969 Continental Mark III

Despite some critical reviews by the automotive press, the public took to the car, with some 7,000 built during the remainder of the 1968 model year, and another 23,858 for the 1969 model year, a respectable showing; Lincoln had always trailed Cadillac in production numbers, but the Mark III equalled the Eldorado, which tallied 23,333 for 1969. This was the start of a long, successful run for the Continental Mark Series. The listed retail price was US$6,741 ($59,183 in 2025 dollars).

Because of its early introduction and extended production year, the 1969 model had several running interior changes. All cars produced after December 31, 1968, were equipped with driver and front passenger head-rests as required by Federal mandate.

== 1970 ==
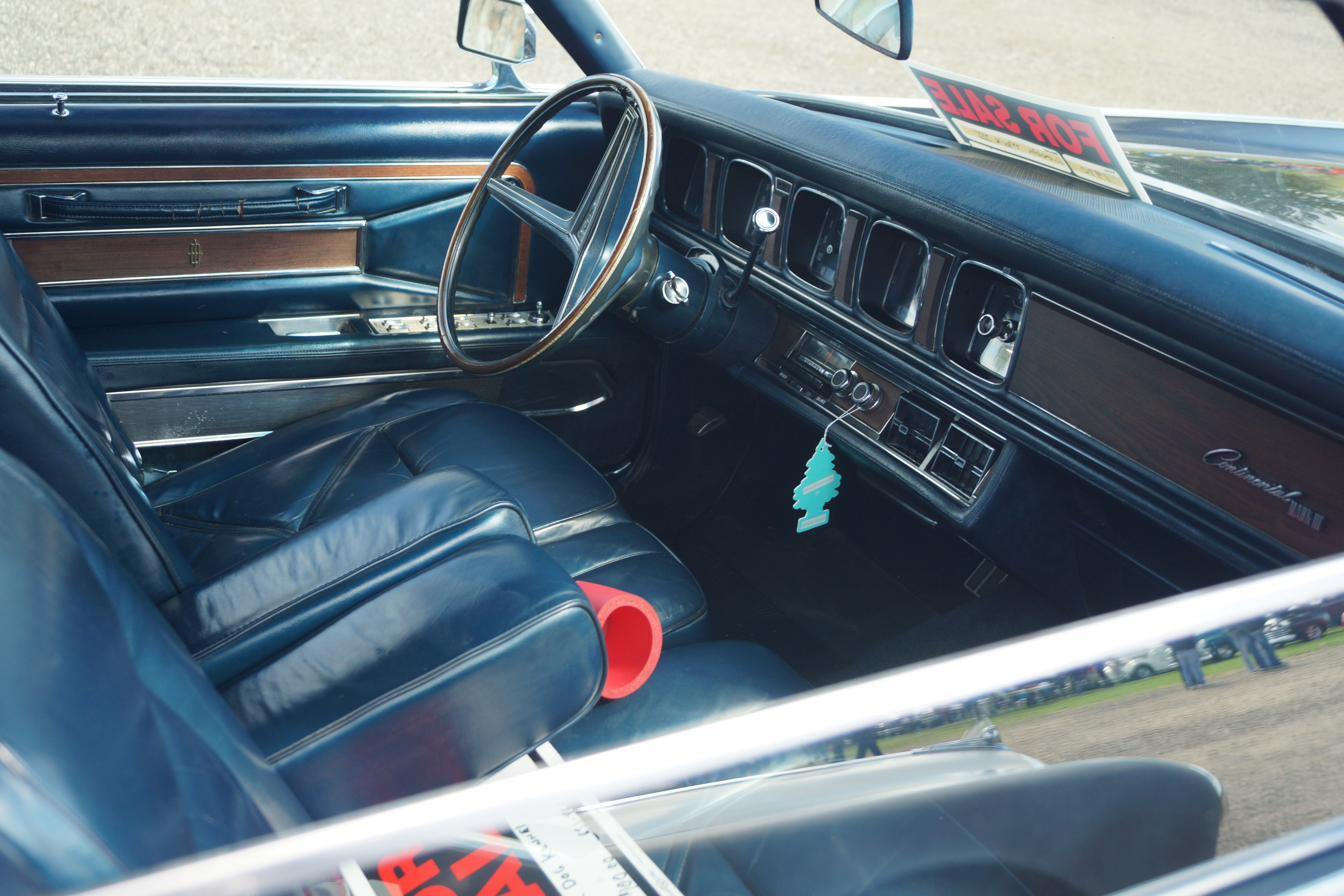
1970 Continental Mark III interior

There were only small changes for 1970 and 21,432 were sold. The vinyl roof was made standard, windshield wipers were now concealed, and the wheel covers were redesigned. Michelin radial tires were standard equipment (a first for an American car), and a locking steering column/ignition switch replaced the dash-mounted switch per federal mandate. The metal horn ring used in '69 was deleted from the steering wheel, and replaced by a Rim Blow unit. Increasingly stringent Federal safety requirements mandated the addition of red reflectors to the rear bumper and yellow reflectors to the sides of the front parking lamp assemblies. Although horsepower remained unchanged at 365, Federal emissions requirements were met by the installation of "Thermactor" air injection pumps on the 460 CID engine. The interior wood appliques were upgraded to genuine Walnut. The door panels were redesigned and the power seat controls were moved from the seat edge to the door armrests. The pattern of the stitching on the seats was modified.

Motor Trend’s 1970 head-to-head review of the Eldorado vs. the Mark III gave the nod, barely, to the Mark III, beginning an annual "King of the Hill" series that ran for years.

== 1971 ==
1971 saw the Golden Anniversary for the Lincoln marque and the third and final year of Mark III production. Sales were better than ever at 27,091, almost equal to the Eldorado's, a harbinger for the new decade.

Little changed from the 1970 model; tinted glass became standard, as did automatic climate-controlled air conditioning and Sure-Trak anti-lock brakes. High-back seats became standard until around December 1970 and then were switched back to the low-back style used in the early 1970 model year. Horsepower remained unchanged at 365, but the 460 CID V8 engine gained a more sophisticated thermostatic air cleaner assembly with its associated ductwork.

In its second annual King of the Hill contest, Motor Trend (July, 1971) again gave the Continental Mark III the nod by a wider margin than 1970 despite it being basically a warmed-over 1968 model while the Cadillac was all-new from the ground up. M/T noted that the Mark III's leather interior was far more luxurious and better detailed than the test Eldorado's nylon cloth and the Continental's real wood dash trim was far more attractive than the Cadillac's simulate.

1972 would see a new, even larger car, the Mark IV, replace the Mark III.

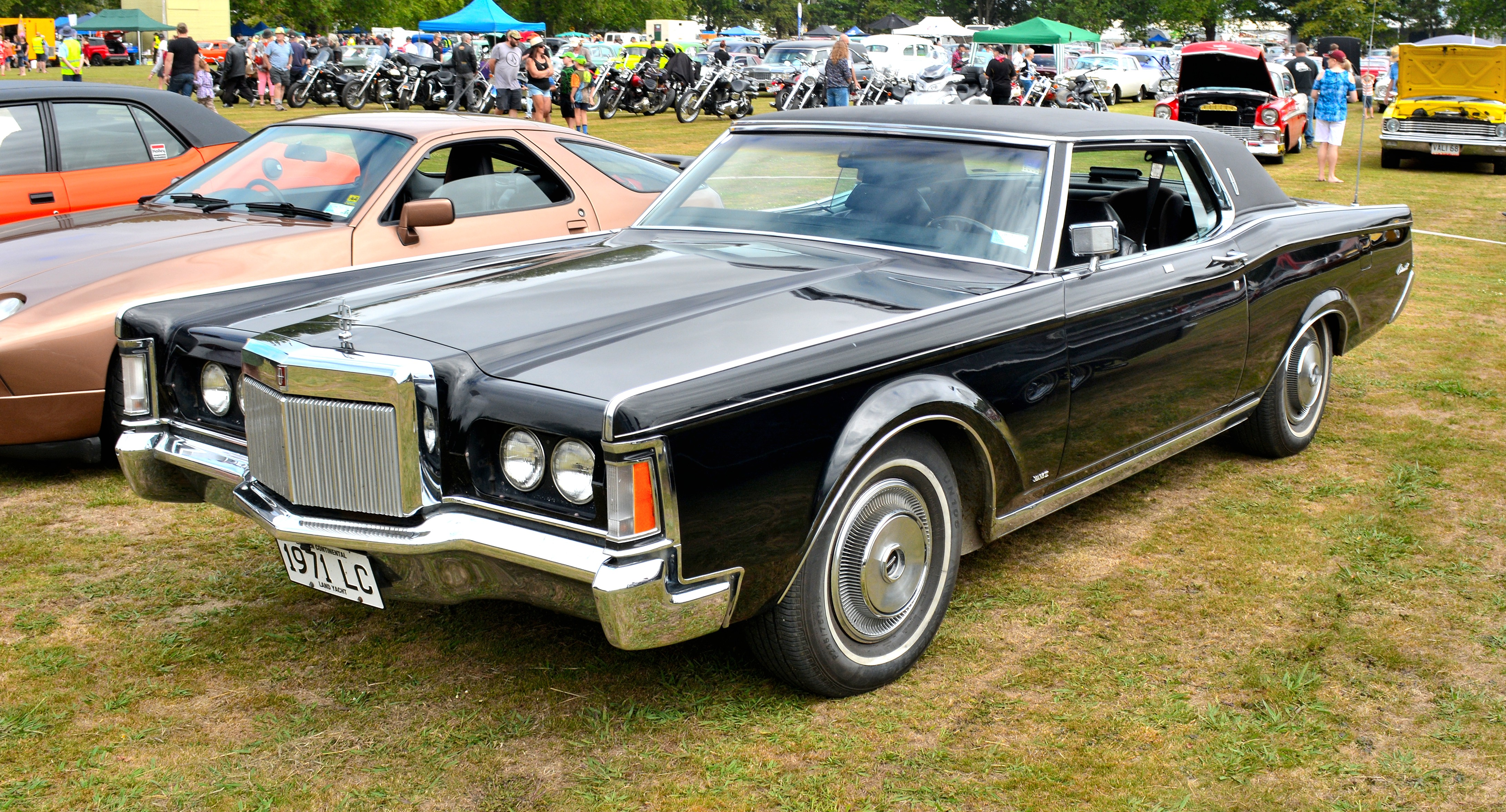
1971

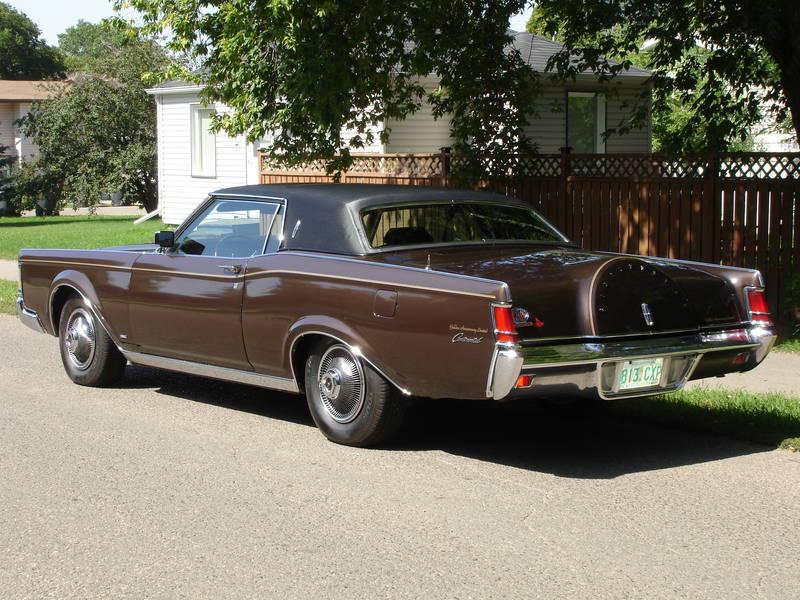
1971

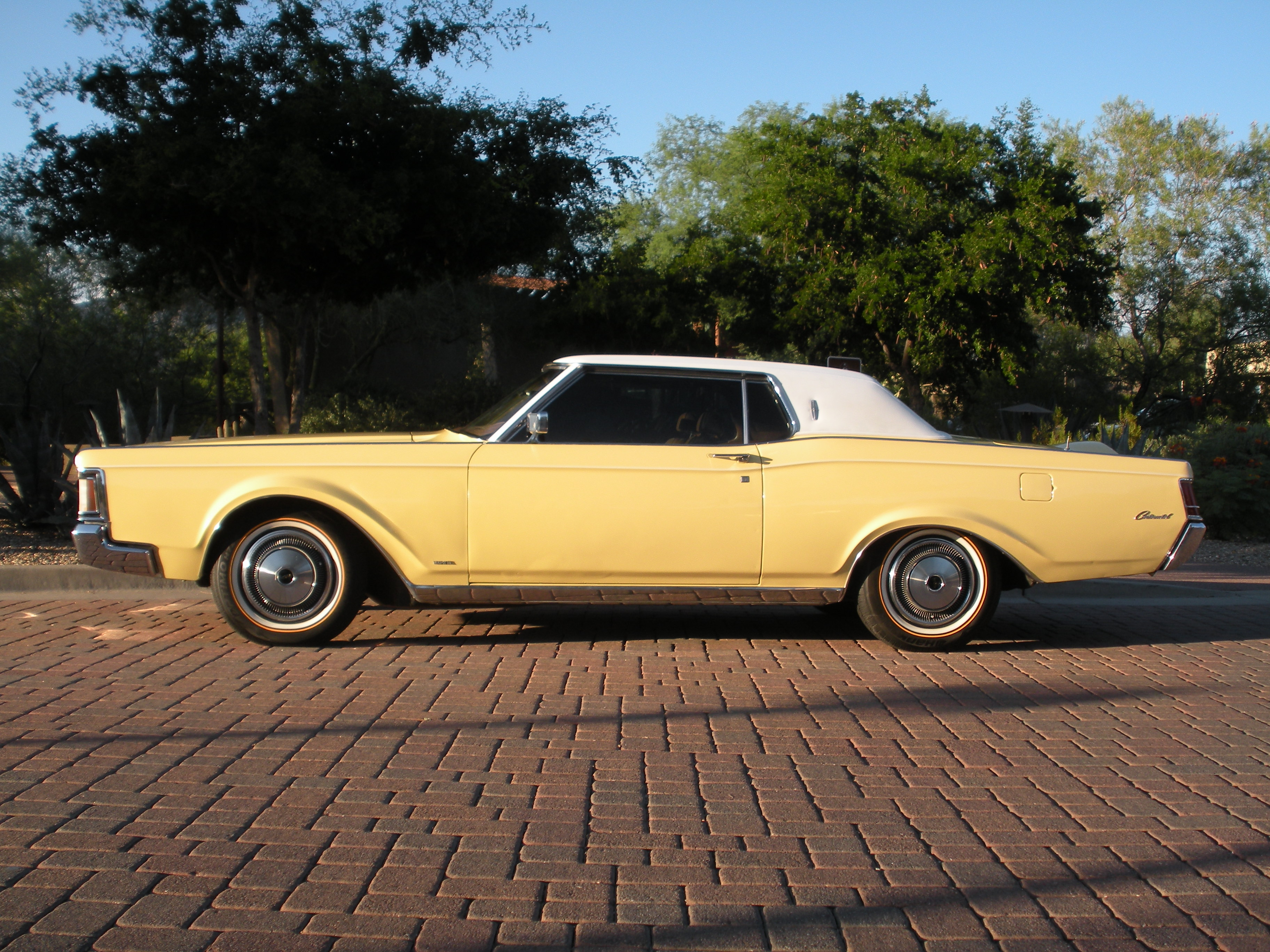
1971

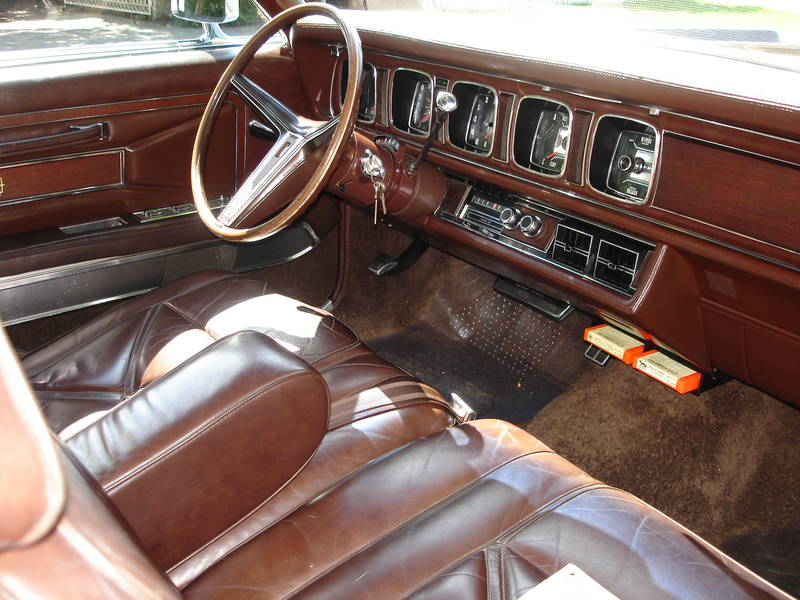
1971 interior

== In popular culture ==
Owners

Notable celebrity owners of Mark IIIs included musicians Elvis Presley, James Brown, and Glen Campbell. Golfers Arnold Palmer and Byron Nelson also served as brand ambassadors for the vehicle.

In cinema

One of the most notable movie appearances of the Continental Mark III is the 1977 horror film The Car which featured a highly customized 1971 Lincoln Continental Mark III designed by famed Hollywood car customizer George Barris. There were four cars built for the film in six weeks. Three were used as stunt mules, the fourth for closeups. The stunt mules were destroyed during production, while the fourth is now in a private collection.

The car's bodywork was painted in steel, pearl and charcoal coloring. The windows were laminated in two different shades, smoked on the inside and amber on the outside, so one could see out of it but not into it. In order to give "the car" a "sinister" look as requested by director Elliot Silverstein, Barris made the car's roof three inches lower than usual and altered its side fenders that same length again both higher and longer. According to Silverstein, the distinctive sound the horn of The Car makes spells out the letter X in Morse code.

The Continental Mark III was also prominently featured in the 1971 crime action thriller film, The French Connection.

== See also ==
- Personal luxury car
