= Ford Pilot Plant =

Coordinates: 42.288207°N 83.2009498°W

The Ford Pilot Plant facility, located at 17000 Oakwood Boulevard in Allen Park, Michigan, was opened in the summer of 1956 as the original location for the newly created Continental Division, where all Continental Mark II cars were assembled. It was renamed the Edsel Division Headquarters until 1959, when Edsel was discontinued and later became the New Model Programs Development Center facility, where new models are tested and developed. The role of the pilot plant is to test manufacture new products for the first time, documenting the steps and procedures, before assembly line production begins at the designated factory. The location can manufacture several vehicles at one time, where products are moved from station to station on mobile carriages until the process is complete.

It is located approximately two miles (3.2 km) west of the famous River Rouge facility, and approximately two miles (3.2 km) east of the Ford Dearborn Development Center, and adjacent to the Ford IT Business Innovation Center to the north. Interstate 94 is directly southeast of the facility. Beaumont Hospital Dearborn and Edsel Ford High School are nearby.

== See also ==
- List of Ford factories
