= Ford Thunderbird (fifth generation) =

Ford Thunderbird Fifth generation
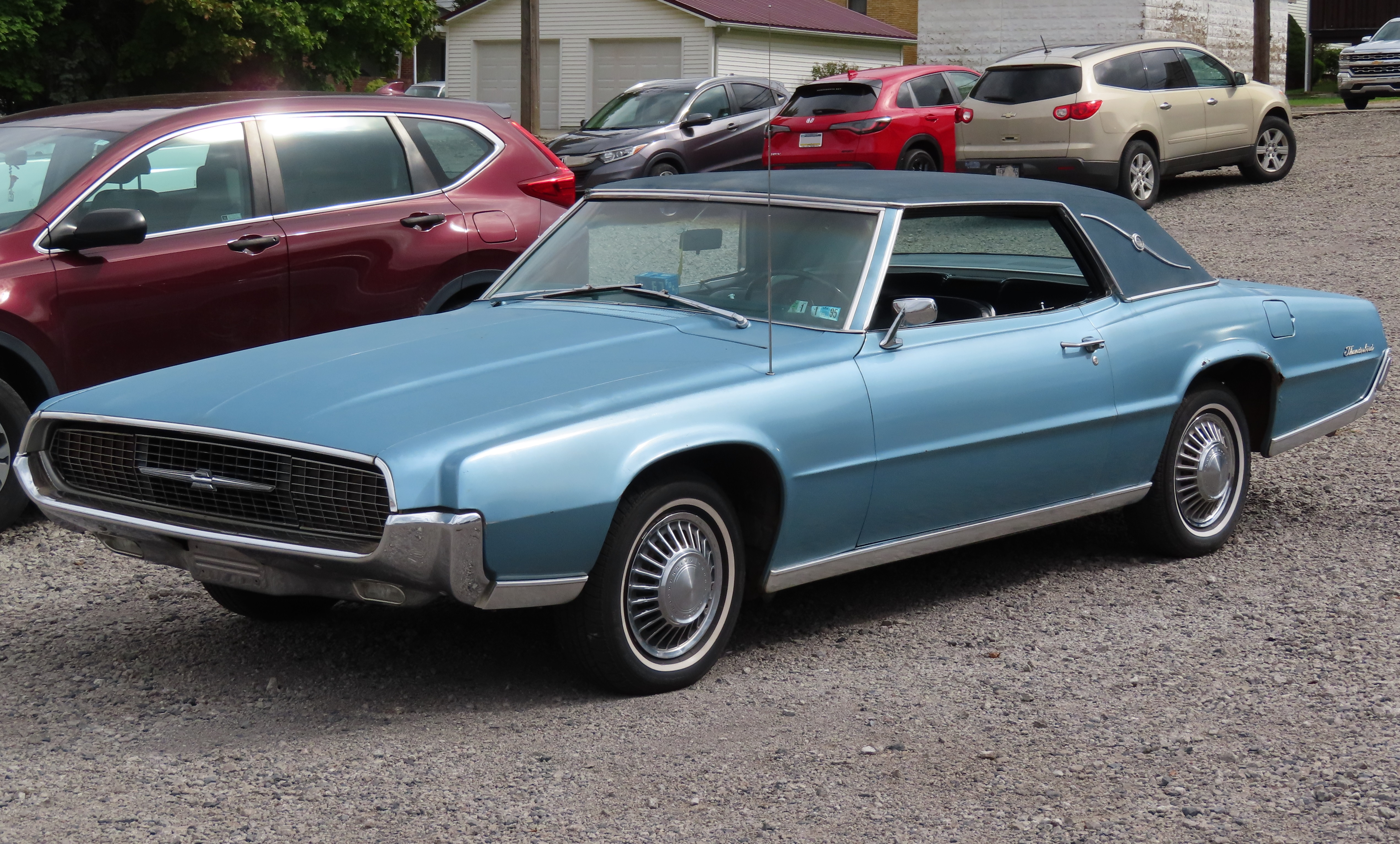
- 1967 Ford Thunderbird

Overview
- Manufacturer: Ford Motor Company
- Production: 1966−1971
- Model years: 1967−1971
- Assembly: United States: Wixom Assembly Plant, Wixom, Michigan

Body and chassis
- Class: Personal luxury car
- Body style: 2-door hardtop coupe; 2-door landau; 4-door pillared hardtop landau sedan
- Layout: Front-engine, rear-wheel-drive
- Chassis: body-on-frame
- Related: Continental Mark III

Powertrain
- Engine: 390 cu in (6.4 L) FE V8; 428 cu in (7.0 L) FE V8; 429 cu in (7.0 L) 385 V8
- Transmission: 3-speed Cruise-o-Matic automatic

Dimensions
- Wheelbase: 2-door models: 115 in (2,921 mm); 4-door Landau: 117.2 in (2977 mm)
- Length: 2-door models: 206.9 in (5,255 mm); 4-door Landau: 209.4 in (5,319 mm)

Chronology
- Predecessor: Ford Thunderbird (fourth generation)
- Successor: Ford Thunderbird (sixth generation)

The fifth generation Ford Thunderbird is a large personal luxury car series, produced by Ford for the 1967–1971 model years.

This fifth generation saw the second major change of direction for the Thunderbird. The Thunderbird had fundamentally remained the same in concept through 1966, although the design had been revised twice. The debut of the Ford Mustang in early 1964, and subsequent introduction of the larger, more upmarket Mercury Cougar to compete with the similarly larger Dodge Charger, began to erode the Thunderbird sales. This drove Ford engineers to increase the vehicle's size yet again, with Ford even introducing four-door Thunderbird Landaus.

== History ==
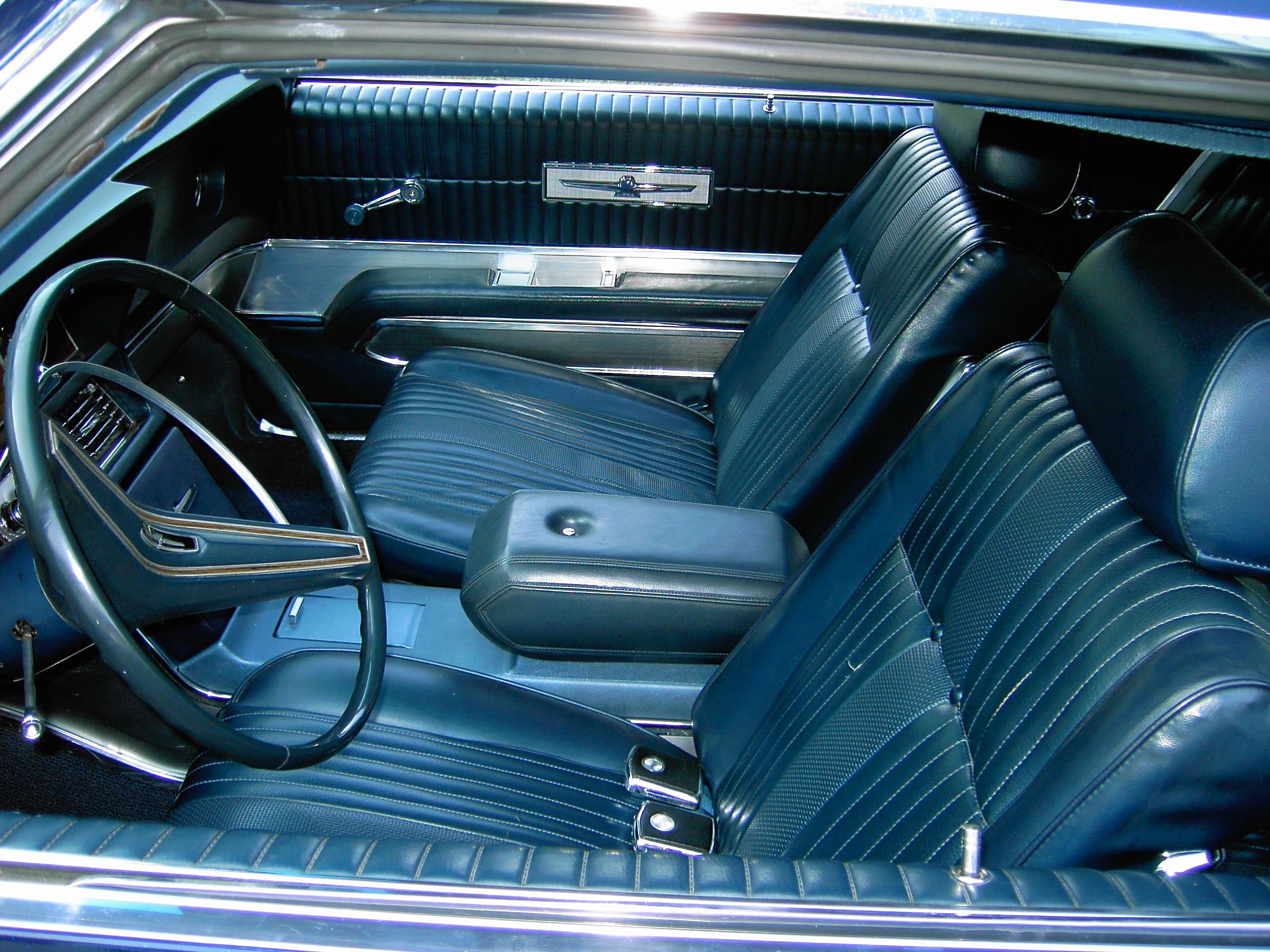
1969 Ford Thunderbird interior

For 1967 the Thunderbird would be a larger car, moving it closer to Lincoln as the company chose to emphasize the "luxury" part of the "personal luxury car" designation. Ford decided to abandon the Thunderbird's typical unibody construction for this larger car, turning to a body-on-frame method with sophisticated rubber mountings between the two to improve noise/vibration characteristics and reduce weight by a small margin. An overhead console (first appearing on the previous years Town Landau) containing illuminated indicators for emergency flasher use, low-fuel warning, door-ajar and seat-belt reminder light returned in a revised format. The listed retail price of the two-door Landau coupe was US$4,704 ($45,420 in 2025 dollars).

The convertible, increasingly a slow seller, was dropped in favor of a four-door model that was 2.5 in (6.3 cm) stretched, featuring suicide doors, a signature feature of the Lincoln Continental four-door sedans of that era. It remained in the lineup through 1971 but never generated substantial sales.

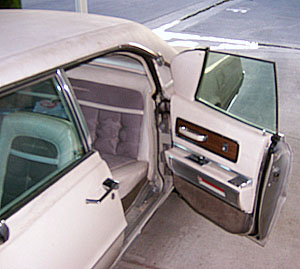
The 4-door Thunderbirds featured quite narrow rear 'suicide' doors.

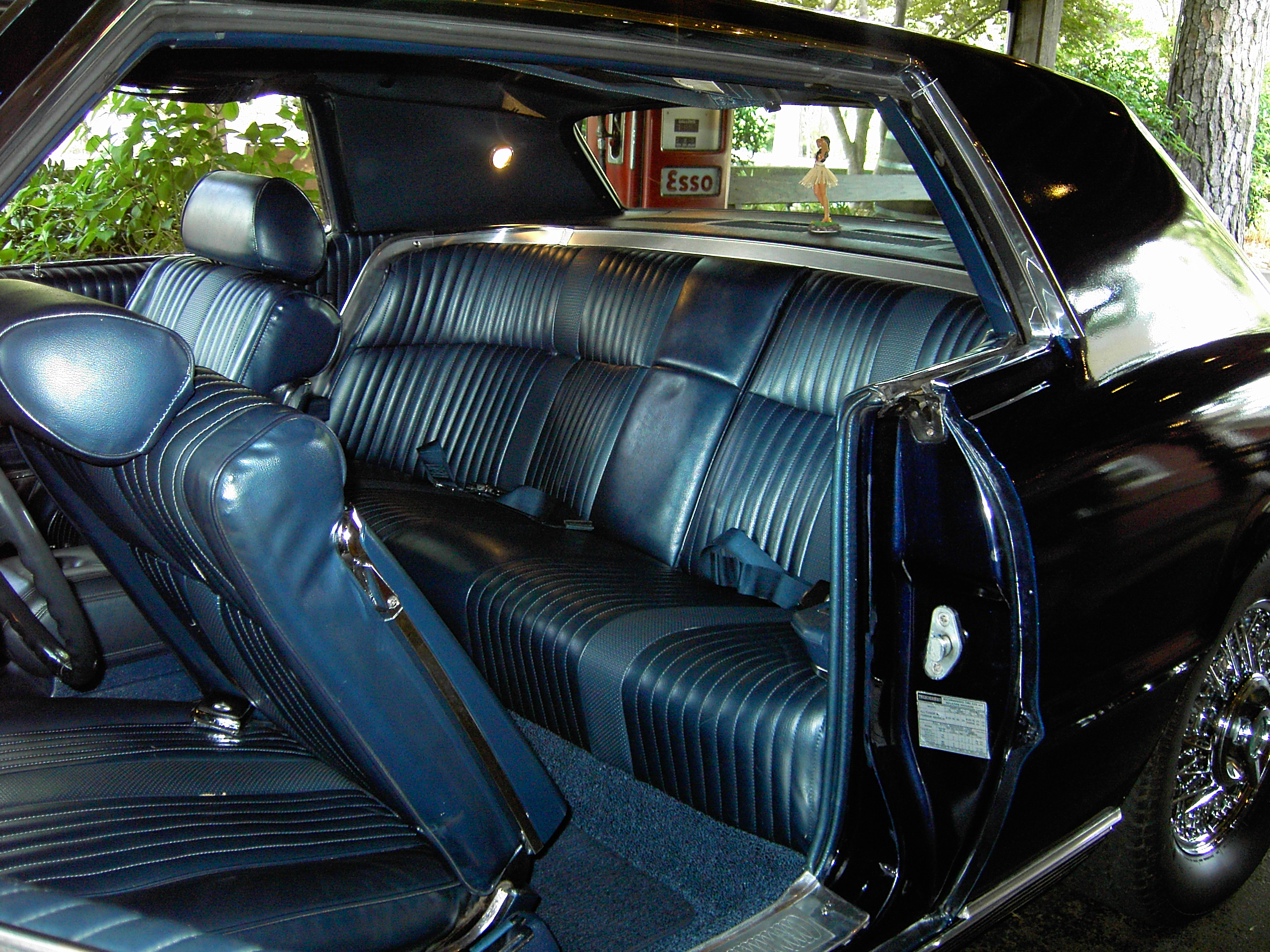
1969 Thunderbird coupe rear seat

The 1967 design was radically different from previous Thunderbirds. Ford's stylists delivered a radical shape that in many ways anticipated the styling trends of the next five years. A gaping wide "fishmouth" front grille that incorporated hidden headlights was the most obvious new feature. The look was enhanced by the flush-fitting front bumper incorporating the bottom "lip" of the "mouth".

The sides were the barrel-like style that was very popular during this period. The belt line kicked up "coke-bottle" style after the rear windows, again a styling trait that would prove ubiquitous. Large C-pillars (and a small "formal" rear window on the 4-door) meant poor rear visibility but this was in line with the fashion of the time. The taillights spanned the full width of the car, and featured, as in previous Thunderbird models, sequential turn signals.

In contrast to the radically different exterior, the new interior carried over nearly all of the themes established by the previous generation: most notably a dash panel with separately housed instruments, along with a downward sweeping/integrated center console and a wraparound rear seat/"lounge".

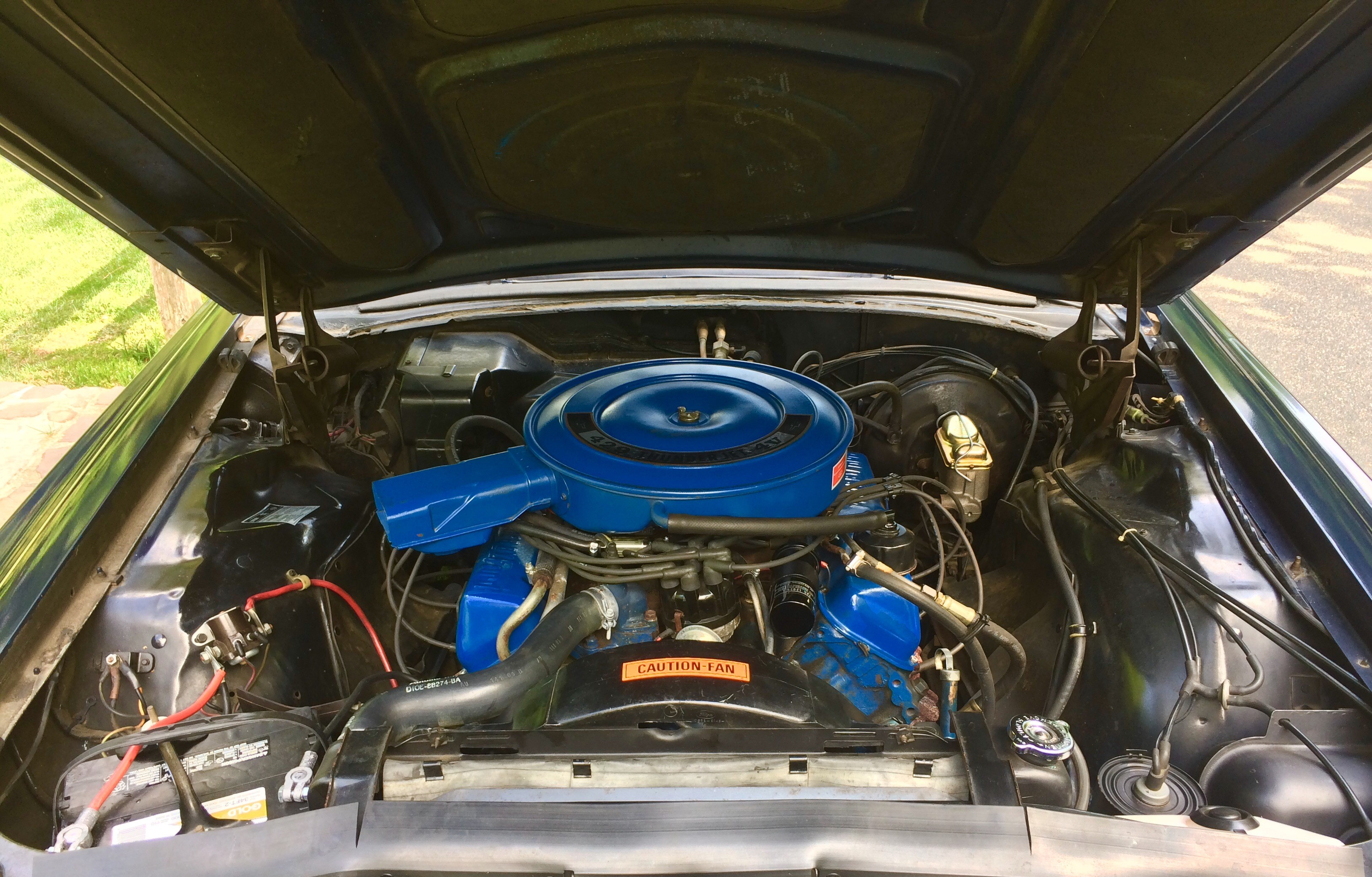
429 Ford Thunder Jet

The 1968 Thunderbird saw the introduction of the new 385 series big-block "Thunder Jet" 4V (4-barrel carburetor) 429 cu in (7.0 L) V8 engines. Like many Ford engines of the time, they were conservatively rated at 360 hp (268 kW) (SAE gross). The new engine made the cars some of the quickest and fastest Thunderbirds ever produced, despite their larger size and increased curb weight. The 1968 and 1969 model years saw minor trim changes.

For 1969, the Continental Mark III was launched as a two-door only personal luxury coupé that was based directly on the four-door, 117 in (2.97 m) wheelbase Thunderbird chassis, and from that point until the end of 1976, Ford Thunderbirds and Continental Marks were related cars. They would share commonality again later from 1984–1998.

For the 1970 model year, the Thunderbird was stylistically updated with the addition of a large, bird's beak-style projection out of its grille. Offered in 2- or 4-door models, all 1970−1971 Thunderbirds had prominent angular lines on the hood leading to a jutting tip, that also formed the center of the grille work, that was not a too thinly disguised bird beak. Semon "Bunkie" Knudsen, a former GM executive now President of Ford, is said to be responsible for this dramatic change. As with the 1967−69 models, the 1970−71 models had sequential turn signals incorporated into the full panel tail lights at the rear of the car.

In 1971, Neiman Marcus offered "his and hers" Thunderbirds in its catalog, with telephones, tape recorders and other niceties. They retailed for US$25,000 for the pair ($198,747 in 2025 dollars).

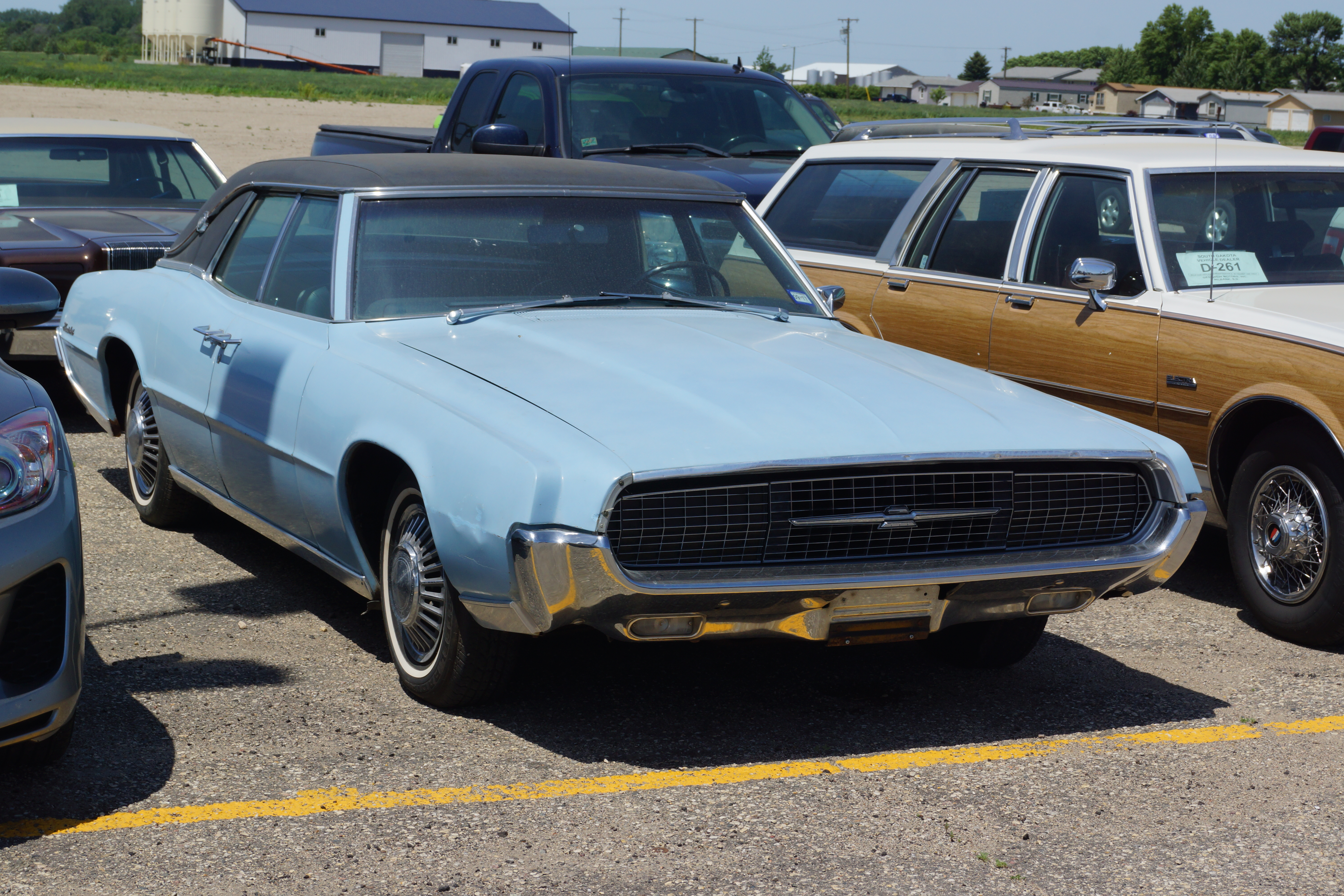
1967 Ford Thunderbird Landau sedan

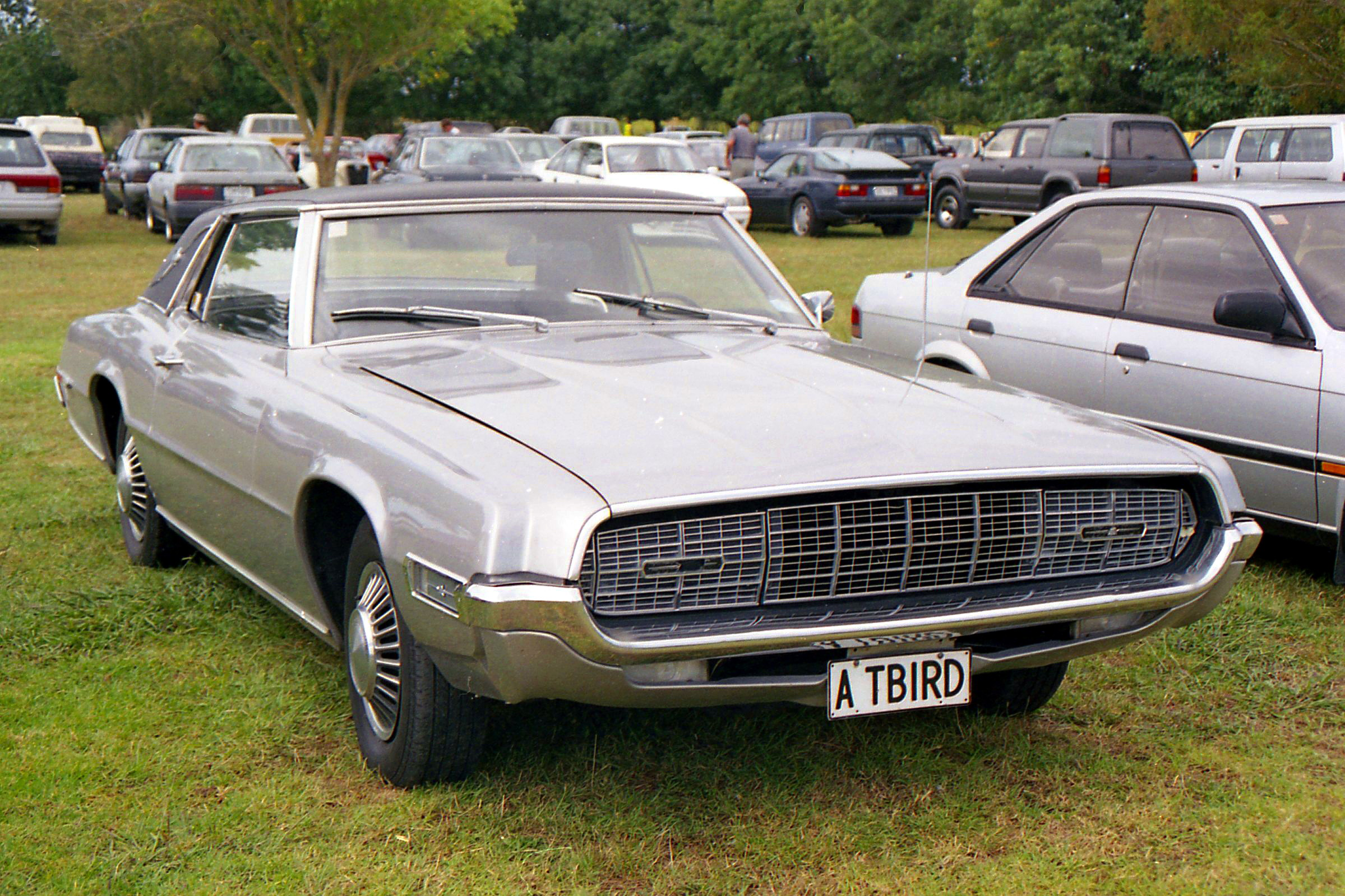
1968 Ford Thunderbird 2-Door Landau

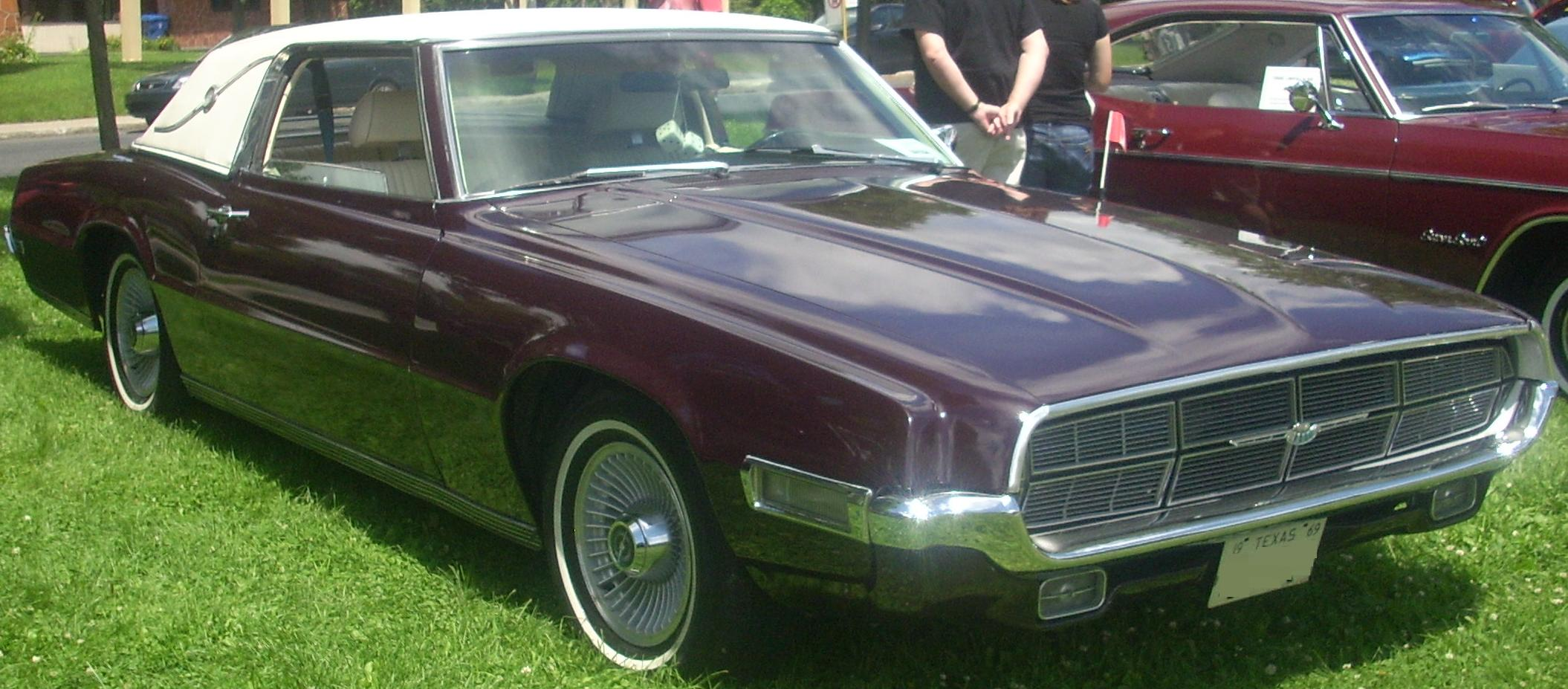
1969 Ford Thunderbird Landau coupe

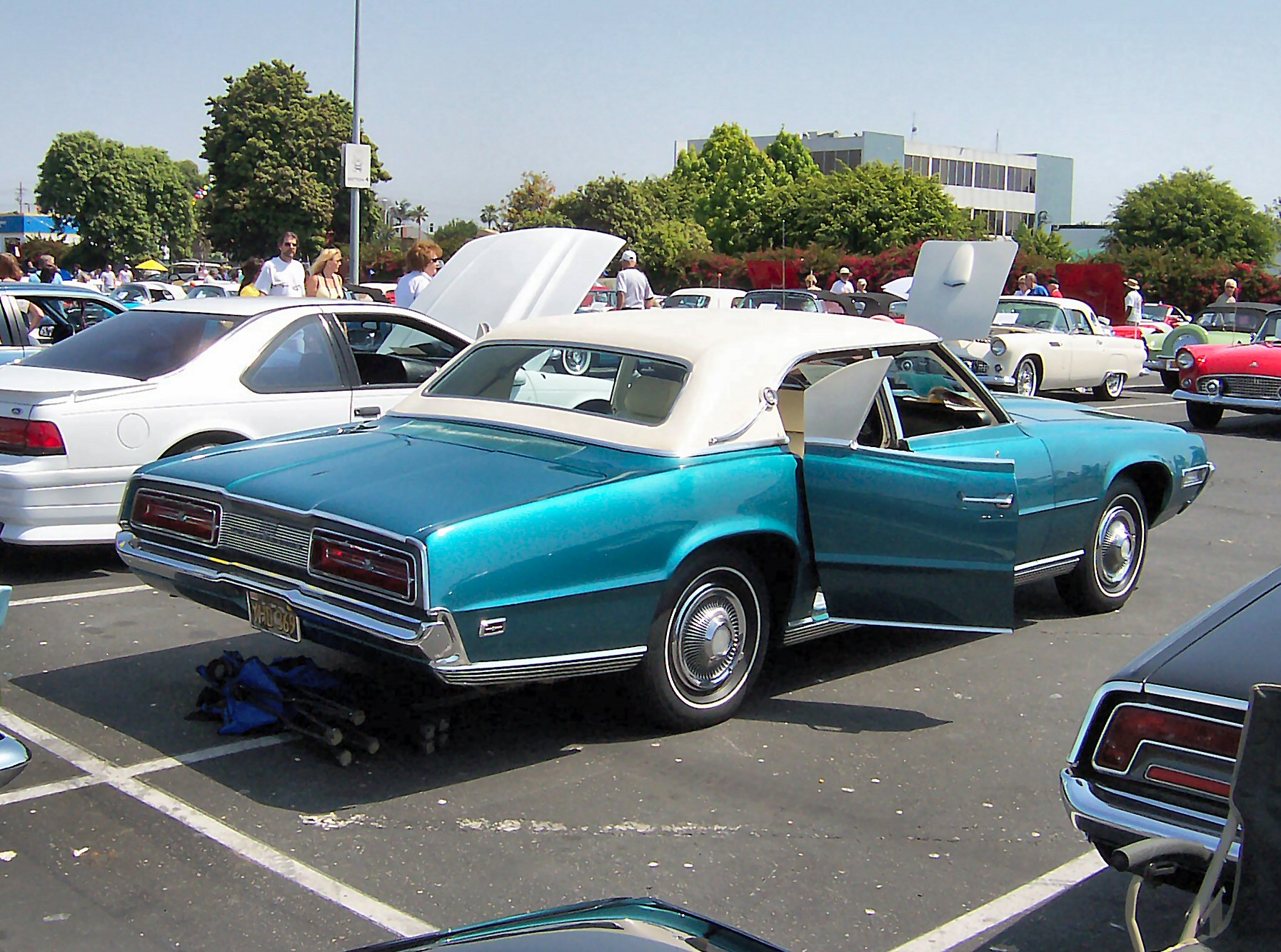
1969 Ford Thunderbird Landau sedan

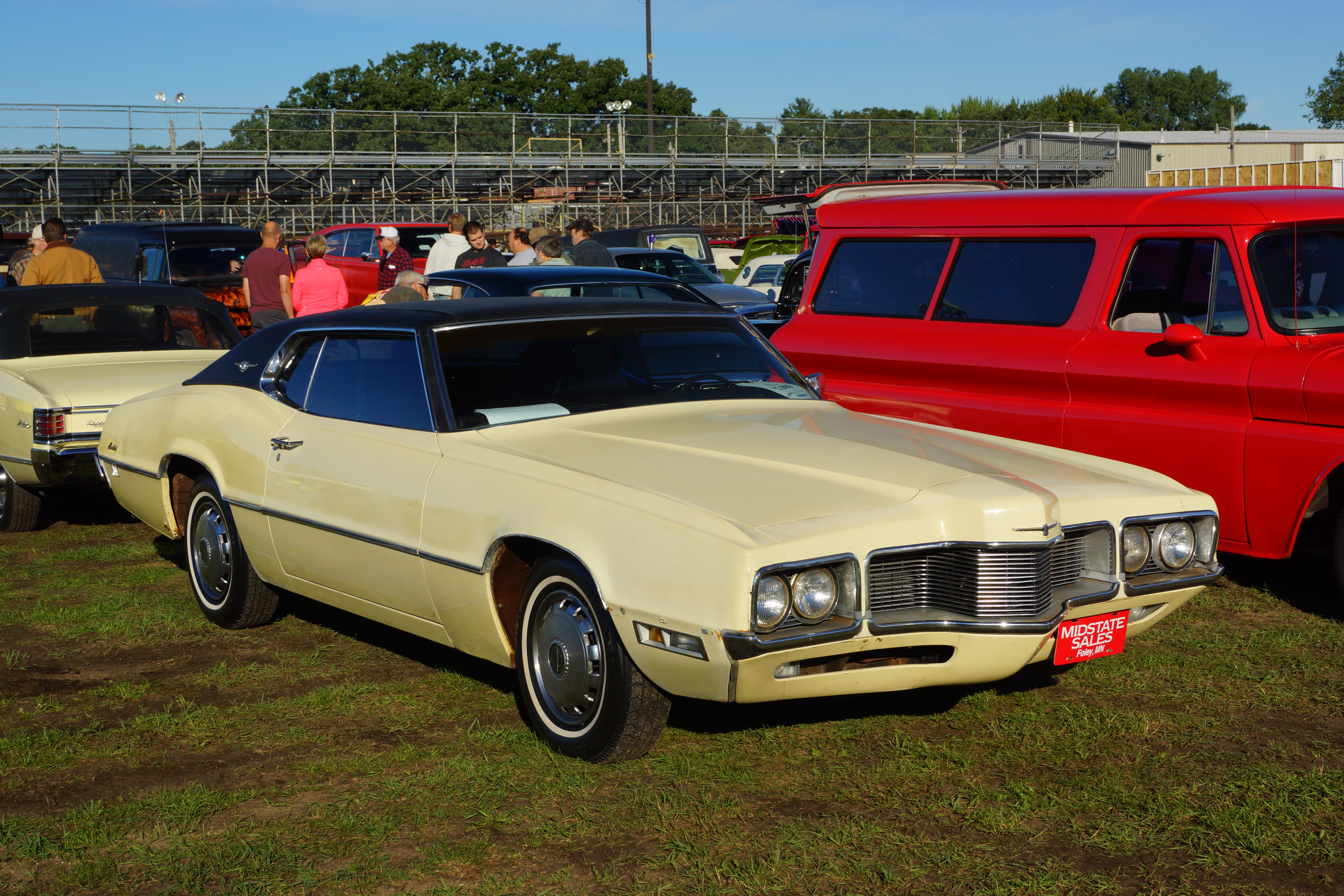
1970 Ford Thunderbird hardtop coupe

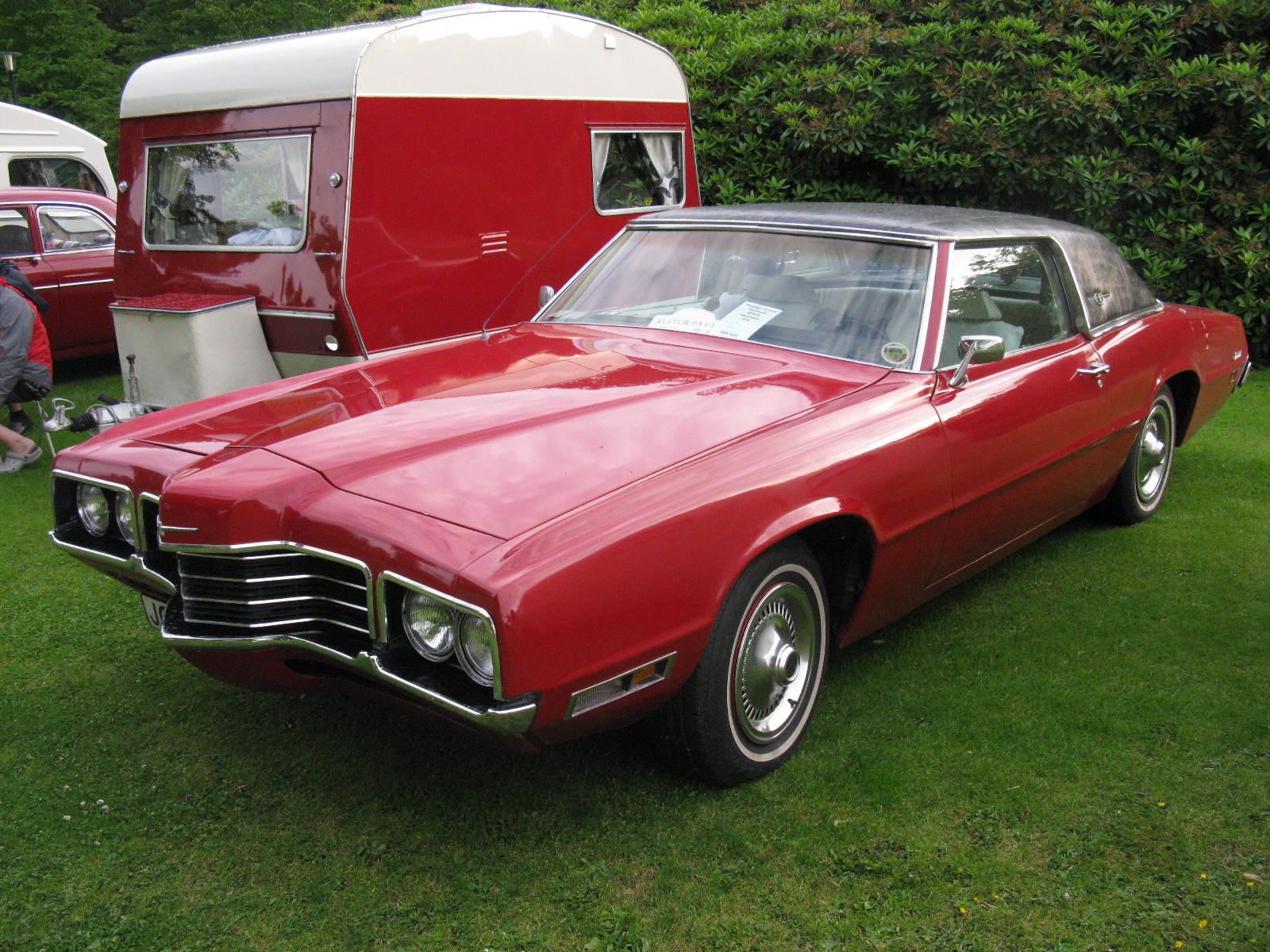
1971 Ford Thunderbird Landau coupe

== Production totals ==
| Year | Production |
|---|---|
| 1967 | 77,976 |
| 1968 | 64,391 |
| 1969 | 49,272 |
| 1970 | 50,364 |
| 1971 | 36,055 |
| Total | 278,058 |
