= Power antenna =

A power antenna is an electrically motorized automotive radio antenna that raises and lowers either manually with a dash-mounted switch or automatically by turning the radio on or off. The automatic kind will also lower when the ignition switch is turned off. Unlike most car antennas adjusted directly by hand, power antennas retract completely beneath the surface that they are mounted on. This convenience could be found on most luxury cars by the late-1950s. The automatic power antenna became much more common in the 1970s.

On many Cadillac models of the 1950s and '60s, the antenna could be raised and lowered by pulling out or pushing in on the radio's volume control knob. The Lincoln Continental of the late 1960s had push-button controls integrated into the factory radio. But most cars had a separate control that often was not even located near the car radio. And sometimes the control on early models was not even labeled, e.g., the late 1960s, early '70s Ford Thunderbird control was integrated into a courtesy light module on the dash panel.
