= Brougham =

Brougham may refer to:

== Transport ==
- Brougham (carriage), a light four-wheeled horse-drawn carriage
- Brougham (car body), an automobile with a similar style

=== Automobile models ===
- Cadillac Brougham, 1987–1992
- Chrysler New Yorker Brougham, c. 1972–1977
- Daewoo Brougham, 1991–1997
- Gloria Brougham, 1975–2004
- Holden Brougham, 1968–1971
- Mercury Brougham, 1967–1968
- Nissan Cedric Brougham, 1975–2004

=== Other transport ===
- Brougham, a barque hired by the New Zealand Company in 1840
- Ryan Brougham, a single-engined aircraft of the 1920s and 1930s

== Places ==
- Brougham, Cumbria, a civil parish on the outskirts of Penrith
  - Brougham Castle, in the parish
- Brougham, Ontario, Canada, a community within Pickering

== People ==
- Baron Brougham and Vaux, a title in the Peerage of the United Kingdom since 1830
  - Henry Brougham, 1st Baron Brougham and Vaux (1778–1868), British statesman
- Doris Brougham (1926–2024), Taiwanese educator and Christian missionary
- Henry Brougham (sportsman) (1888–1923), British rackets player
- James Brougham (1780–1833), British politician
- John Brougham (1814–1880), Irish-American actor and dramatist
- Royal Brougham (1894–1978), Washington sports journalist
- Tom Brougham (born 1943), California gay rights activist

== Other uses ==
- Brougham (band), short-lived rap/nu metal band in 2000
- Brougham Place, North Adelaide, a street in South Australia
