= Arnold Schwarzenegger and LGBTQ rights =

Governor of California and minorities

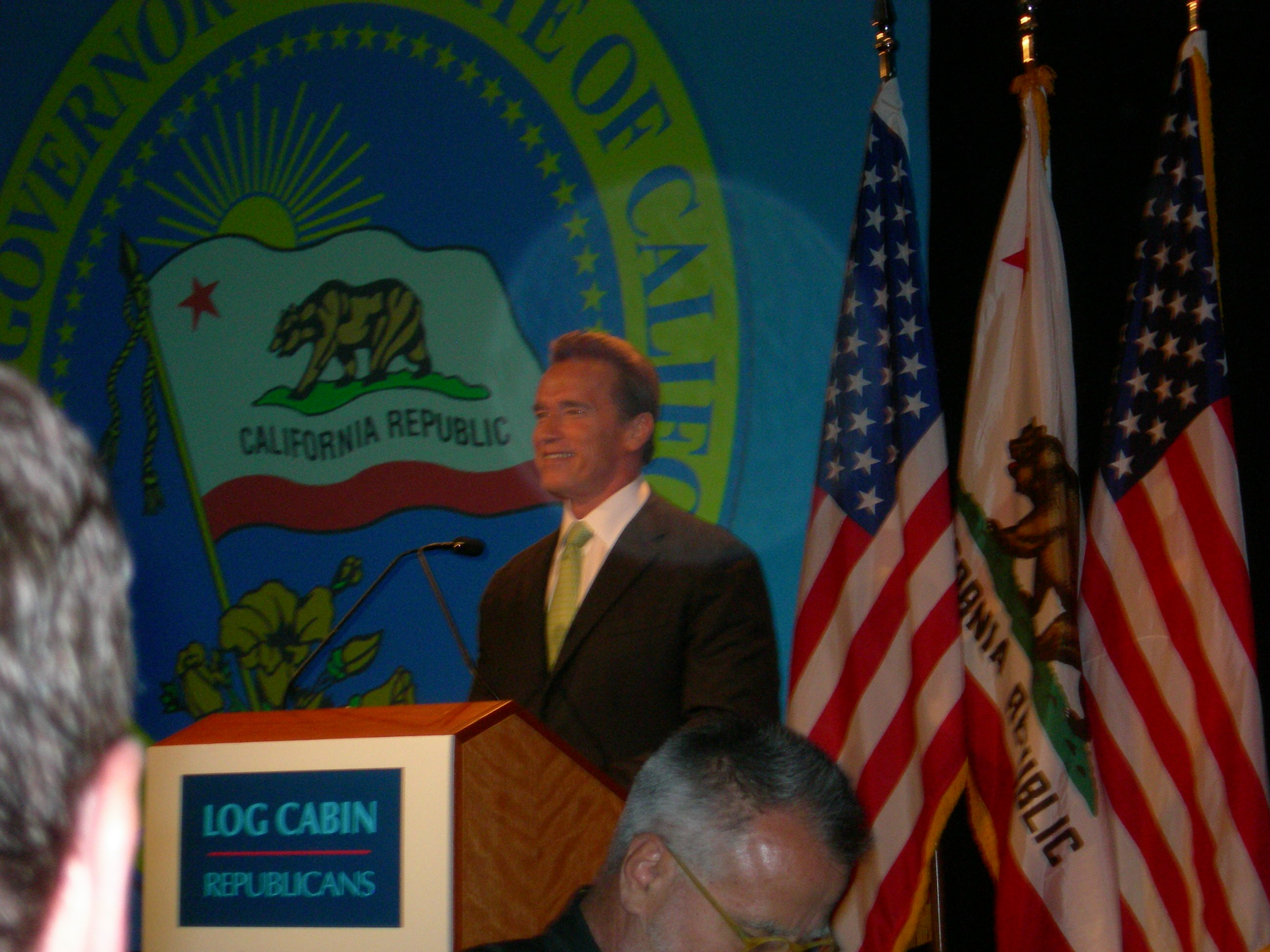
Governor Arnold Schwarzenegger at the Log Cabin Republicans' Courage To Lead Dinner held on June 29, 2006 in Hollywood, California.

Arnold Schwarzenegger was an early opponent of same-sex marriage in the United States, including during his Governorship of California. As an elected official he opposed legal recognition of same-sex marriage but otherwise he supported LGBT rights legislation, including civil unions.

== Governorship ==
=== 2004 ===
In February 2004 when San Francisco Mayor Gavin Newsom ordered a change in the certificate application documents to allow for same-sex marriages, Governor Schwarzenegger opposed the move as being beyond the powers of the mayor but also said that he supports gay rights and has expressed support for a law to grant civil unions to gay couples.

On March 31, 2004, Governor Schwarzenegger issued Executive Order S-6-04, which states that "All state agencies, departments, boards, and commissions shall recruit, appoint, train, evaluate and promote state personnel on the basis of merit and fitness, without regard to age, race, ethnicity, color, ancestry, national origin, gender, marital status, sexual orientation, religion, disability or other non-job-related factors."

On September 13, 2004, Governor Schwarzenegger signed the California Insurance Equality Act into law, which expanded California's domestic partnership registry to require a health care service plan and a health insurer to provide coverage to the registered domestic partner of an employee, subscriber, insured, or policyholder that is equal to the coverage it provides to the spouse of those persons and would extend this requirement to all other forms of insurance regulated by the Department of Insurance and would deem that all of those policies as well as health care service plans and health insurance policies issued, amended, delivered, or renewed in this state on or after January 1, 2005, or January 2, 2005, as specified, provide registered domestic partner coverage equal to that provided to spouses.

On September 23, 2004, Governor Schwarzenegger signed the Omnibus Hate Crimes Bill into law, a bill that defines the legal term hate crime for all state and local agencies, encourages the creation of local law enforcement hate-crime protocols and increased hate crime awareness training for law enforcement officers.

On September 25, 2004, Governor Schwarzenegger signed the Omnibus Labor & Employment Non-Discrimination Bill into law, a bill to unify all state anti-discrimination codes to match the California Fair Employment and Housing Act. In essence it adds sexual orientation and gender identity anti-discrimination protections to the California government, labor, military and veterans, public utilities, unemployment and insurance, and welfare and institutions codes.

On September 27, 2004, Governor Schwarzenegger signed SB 1193 into law, a bill to provide a $10,000 death benefit to the surviving spouse or designated beneficiary of a member of one of the state military reserves (California National Guard, State Military Reserve, or Naval militia). The bill, retroactive to March 1, 2003, allows LGBT partners of military personnel be listed as designated beneficiary.

On September 29, 2004, Governor Schwarzenegger vetoed AB 1520, a bill that would have established the California Veterans Memorial Commission. Also that same day, he signed the Domestic Partner Technical Clean-up Bill into law, which makes technical changes to the California Domestic Partner Rights & Responsibilities Act, including effective date of community property, third party obligations, allowing the creation of pre-partnership agreements for previously-registered couples, etc.

=== 2005 ===
On July 25, 2005, Governor Schwarzenegger signed AB 378 into law, that extend the statute of limitation from two to three years for filing civil claims against hate crimes perpetrators or civil rights violators acting under color of law.

On September 6, 2005, Governor Schwarzenegger vetoed the Code of Fair Campaign Practices, a bill that would have added sexual orientation to a voluntary list of prohibited topics in political campaign advertising.

On September 29, 2005, Governor Schwarzenegger vetoed AB 849, a bill that would have legalized same-sex marriage in California. Also that same day, he signs Civil Rights Act of 2005 into law, which expanded the Unruh Civil Rights Act to further prohibit that discrimination on the basis of sex/gender, sexual orientation, and marital status in public accommodations. Also that same day, he signs SB 565 into law, which, commencing with the lien date for the 2006-07 fiscal year, exclude from the definition of "change in ownership" any transfer of property between registered domestic partners and would provide that, notwithstanding Section 2229 of the Revenue and Taxation Code, no appropriation is made and the state shall not reimburse local agencies for property tax revenues lost by them pursuant to the bill. Also the same day, he signed SB 973, which revises and recast those provisions to require the form to include the signature of the member's spouse or domestic partner, as specified, and be received at the system's headquarters, as provided, and for purposes of the provision of certain postretirement death benefits, that a surviving domestic partner shall be treated in the same manner as a surviving spouse if the domestic partner is in a registered domestic partnership that meets specified criteria or if the retired member and their domestic partner, who are currently in a registered domestic partnership, sign an affidavit that makes specified statements. Because moneys in the Public Employees' Retirement Fund would be used for a new purpose, this bill would make an appropriation, and revise and recast the provisions described above in connection with the extension of the rights and duties of marriage to domestic partnerships that occurred on and after 2005. Because moneys in the Public Employees' Health Care Fund would be used for a new purpose, this bill would make an appropriation and entitle a retired member and their domestic partner to the same entitlements as described above, if specified criteria are satisfied, including providing an affidavit signed by the member and domestic partner under penalty of perjury relative to the member's service retirement effective date or disability retirement date and expand those provisions to provide that a conservatee retains the capacity to enter into a domestic partnership, as specified. Also that same day, he signed AB 1586 into law, a prohibit gender-based discrimination in health insurance. Also that day, he vetoed AB 723, which would have required the State Board of Education (SBE), as a component of reviewing curriculum frameworks, and after consulting civil rights organizations that relate to discrimination on the basis of disabilities, gender, nationality, race or ethnicity, religion, and sexual orientation, to integrate instruction on intergroup relations and tolerance into existing curriculum frameworks.

On October 7, 2005, Governor Schwarzenegger signed AB 1669 into law, which extend the statute of limitations for filing an administrative complaint in employment discrimination cases until one year from the date that a victim attains the age of majority.

=== 2006 ===
On August 28, 2006, Governor Schwarzenegger signed the Nondiscrimination in State Programs and Activities Act into law, a bill that prohibits discrimination based on sexual orientation and gender identity in state operated or funded services, activities and programs. Gay Rights Watch commented that: "Governor Schwarzenegger, despite the huge blow he dealt to the gay and lesbian community by vetoing AB 849, has signed more pro-LGBT laws than any other Governor in California history--and probably in the US for that matter."

On September 6, 2006, Governor Schwarzenegger vetoed SB 1437, a bill that would have amended the Education Code to prohibit discrimination based on sexual orientation and gender identity in text books, classroom instruction, and school-sponsored activities.

On September 28, 2006, Governor Schwarzenegger signed the Gwen Araujo Justice for Victims Act, a bill that affirms legislative intent stating that use of panic defense by criminal defendants to appeal to the bias of jurors is against public policy. Also that same day, he signed the Code of Fair Campaign Practices, a bill that includes a voluntary pledge to not use or permit any appeal to negative prejudices based on sexual orientation or gender identity. Also that same day, he signed The Civil Rights Housing Act of 2006, a bill that standardize various housing-related nondiscrimination provisions in California law to make them consistent with the Fair Employment and Housing Act. Also that same day, he vetoed the Safe Place to Learn Act, a bill that would prohibit discrimination and harassment in public schools.

On September 29, 2006, Governor Schwarzenegger signed the State Income Tax Equity Act, a bill that establishes the requirement that couples registered as California domestic partners file their state income taxes as married couples. Also that same day, he vetoed AB 1056, a bill that would have established the Tolerance Education Pilot Program, to be administered by the State Department of Education, to promote instruction in public schools on tolerance and intergroup relations as part of the instruction in the history/social science content standards, as specified. Also that same day, he vetoed SB 1471, a bill that would have required any state-funded or administered program that provides education to prevent adolescent or unintended pregnancy or to prevent sexually transmitted infections to be, among other requirements, medically accurate, free from specified biases, culturally and linguistically appropriate, and does not teach or promote any religious doctrine.

On September 30, 2006, Governor Schwarzenegger signed AB 2051, a bill that establishes a fee of $23 to be imposed upon persons registering as domestic partners to develop and support a training curriculum specific to lesbian, gay, bisexual, and transgender domestic abuse support service providers who serve that community in regard to domestic violence, and to provide brochures specific to lesbian, gay, bisexual, and transgender domestic abuse, as specified, and establish the Equality in Prevention and Services for Domestic Abuse Fund for the deposit and use of those fees and require a brochure specific to lesbian, gay, bisexual, and transgender domestic abuse prepared by the State Department of Health Services to be printed by the Secretary of State and made available to, upon request by, certain domestic partner registrants, as specified and revise the grant program to include the lesbian, gay, bisexual, and transgender community for certain purposes of the grant program and also require membership on the council by representatives of the lesbian, gay, bisexual, and transgender community and require that the commission responsible for that training program, consult with a representative of service providers serving victims of domestic violence in the lesbian, gay, bisexual, and transgender community and require the training workshops to also include a curriculum component specific to lesbian, gay, bisexual, and transgender domestic abuse and also require membership on the council by at least one representative of the lesbian, gay, bisexual, and transgender community and establish a similar grant program administered by that and funded by the Equality in Prevention and Services for Domestic Abuse Fund for grants to serve the lesbian, gay, bisexual, and transgender community relative to domestic abuse, as specified. Also that day, he signed AB 2920, a bill that includes senior LGBT Californians in the Mello-Granlund Older Californians Act, which sets forth the state's commitment to its elder population who are served by programs administered by the California Department of Aging.

=== 2007 ===
On October 10, 2007, Governor Schwarzenegger signed the SB 105 into law, a follow-up bill re DP joint state income tax filing which clarifies that an RDP or a former RDP would be treated as a spouse or former spouse for personal income tax and corporation tax purposes.

On October 12, 2007, Governor Schwarzenegger vetoed the Religious Freedom & Civil Marriage Protection Act that would have legalized same-sex marriage in California. Also that same day he signed the Civil Rights Act of 2007 into law, that strengthens and clarifies 51 existing non-discrimination sections within the California Codes to conform with the Unruh Civil Rights Act and Gov. Code Sec. 11135, the principal non-discrimination provision dealing with state-funded programs and activities. Also that same day, he signed AB 102 into law, that allows one or both parties to a marriage or registered domestic partnership to change their surname by entering a new surname on either a marriage license application or certificate of registered domestic partnership. Also that same day, he signed AB 394 into law, which requires the California Department of Education (CDE) to assess schools, as part of CDE's existing monitoring process, for compliance with specific anti-discrimination and harassment policies and procedures, and display on their web site specific bias-related and discrimination and harassment information. Also that same day, he signed SB 559, which allows registered domestic partners whose property was reassessed due to a change of ownership between January 1, 2000, and January 1, 2006, to apply to the county assessor by June 30, 2009 to receive a reversal of the reassessment. Also that same day, he signed SB 777, which updated California's Education Code and ensure the strengthening and uniformity of all non-discrimination policies governing all publicly funded schools, charter schools, alternative schools, and post-secondary educational institutions.

On October 13, 2007, Governor Schwarzenegger signed AB 629, which requires any state-funded or administered sex education programs to be, among other requirements, medically accurate, free from specified biases, culturally and linguistically appropriate, and does not teach or promote any religious doctrine. Also that same day, he signed SB 518 into law, which enacts the Youth Bill of Rights that would protect LGBT youth in the juvenile justice system. Also that same day, he vetoed SB 549, which would have extend to employees up to four days of bereavement leave upon the death of a spouse, child, parent, sibling, grandparent, grandchild, or registered domestic partner. Also that same day, he vetoed SB 727, which would have conformed the unpaid family leave law (California Family Rights Act) to the paid Family Temporary Disability Insurance program to extend the leave to care for an ill domestic partner. Expand the definition of family leave under both laws to include family leave to care for sick grandparents, grandchildren, parents-in-law, and siblings. Also that same day, he vetoed SB 836l, which would have added familial status in the non-discrimination bases under the Fair Employment & Housing Act (FEHA).

=== 2008 ===
On July 22, 2008, Governor Schwarzenegger signed AB 2673, which conforms provisions of the County Employees' Retirement Law of 1937 ('37 Act) to be consistent with the provisions of the California Domestic Partnership Act of 2003, AB 205.

On September 28, 2008, Governor Schwarzenegger vetoed AB 2874, which would have deleted the $150,000 limitation on actual damages that may be assessed by the California Fair Employment and Housing Commission against a respondent who violates the California Civil Rights Act of 2005, as an unlawful practice. Also that same day, he signed SB 1729, which requires all registered nurses, certified nurse assistants, licensed vocational nurses, and physician and surgeons working in skilled nursing facilities or congregate living health facilities participate in a training program to be prescribed by the State Department of Public Health that focuses on preventing and eliminating discrimination based on sexual orientation and gender identity.

On September 30, 2008, Governor Schwarzenegger vetoed AB 2567, which would have declared May 22 as Harvey Milk State Holiday (non-fiscal) and designate that date as having special significance in public schools and educational institutions and encourage those entities to conduct suitable commemorative exercises on that date. Also that same day, he signed AB 2654 into law, which conforms statutory code provisions prohibiting discrimination in specific government and business operations to those characteristics already covered by non-discrimination laws of general application to government operations and business establishments. Also that same day, he signed AB 3015 into law, which requires additional subject matter coverage in mandatory trainings of foster care providers and licensing personnel to include basic instruction on existing laws regarding the safety of foster youth at school, including the California Student Safety and Violence Prevention Act of 2000. Also that same day, he vetoed SB 153, which would have excluded a transfer of co-tenancy interest in a principal residence from property tax reassessment if the principal residence was owned by two individuals and was transferred to one of those individuals upon the death of the other, with the survivor obtaining sole ownership of that property. Also that same day, he vetoed SB 1661, which would have provided that an individual shall be deemed to have left their most recent work with good cause if the individual's employment is terminated as a result of the individual's taking a qualifying leave under the family temporary disability insurance program.

=== 2009 ===
On October 11, 2009, Governor Schwarzenegger signed SB 54 into law, which recognizes same-sex couples as being married if they married outside of California before Proposition 8 went into effect and would also give same-sex couples who married elsewhere after Proposition 8 went into effect the same rights as heterosexual couples, except for the designation of marriage. Also that day, he vetoed AB 115, which would have authorized Santa Clara County's local initiative to extend health care services insurance coverage to the spouses, domestic partners or eligible dependent children of program enrollees. Also that same day, he vetoed AB 382, which would have required the California Department of Corrections and Rehabilitation (CDCR) to consider sexual orientation and gender identity when classifying inmates in order to prevent sexual violence. Also that same day, he vetoed AB 772, which would have established the Local Government Identification Act, which would authorize counties to issue local identification cards (local ID cards) to persons who can provide proof of identity and proof of residency within the county. Also that same day, he vetoed AB 985, which would have required a county recorder, title insurance company or other entity transferring of a deed or other written instrument relating to title in real property to provide the recipient with a document that will allow the recipient to remove the unlawful restrictive covenants and to create a public record which does not contain the restrictive covenant. Also that same day, he signed AB 1003 into law, which expands access for LGBT service providers to a state fund that supports LGBT-specific domestic violence programs across the state and is subsidized by a $23 fee on new domestic partner registrations. Also that same day, he vetoed AB 1185, which would have allowed qualified transgender people born in California to return to the county of their birth to obtain a new birth certificate reflecting the correct gender, as well as any accompanying name change. Also that same day, he signed SB 273, which changes the definition of domestic violence to mean the infliction or threat of physical harm against past or present adult or adolescent intimate partners, to include physical, sexual, and psychological abuse against the partner, that is a part of a pattern of assaultive, coercive, and controlling behaviors directed at achieving compliance from, or control over, that partner. The bill would also make the department's comprehensive shelter-based service grant program subject to specified anti-discrimination provisions. Also that same day, he signed SB 572, which requires the governor to proclaim May 22 each year as Harvey Milk Day. It would encourage public schools and educational institutions to conduct suitable commemorative exercises on that date. Also that same day, SB 739, which prohibits the spouse or domestic partner of an elected officer or a candidate for elective office from receiving compensation from campaign funds held by a controlled committee of the elected officer or candidate for services rendered in connection with fundraising for the benefit of the elected officer or candidate.

=== 2010 ===
On September 23, 2010, Governor Schwarzenegger vetoed AB 633, which would have required the California Department of Corrections and Rehabilitation (CDCR) to consider sexual orientation and gender identity when classifying inmates in order to prevent sexual violence.

On September 27, 2010, Governor Schwarzenegger signed AB 2199 into law, which repeals section of the California Welfare and Institutions code that instructed the State Department of Mental Health to conduct research into the "causes and cures of homosexuality." Also that same day, he signed AB 2700 into law, which creates a consolidated form and procedure to dissolve both a civil marriage and domestic partnership at the same time. Before the signing of AB 2700 into law, there were unnecessary complexities in place exclusively for same-sex couples which made it difficult to perform the aforementioned dissolution.

On September 30, 2010, Governor Schwarzenegger vetoed AB 1680, which would have prohibited contracts from requiring a person to waive their legal rights and procedures under the civil rights laws dealing with bias-motivated violence and hate crimes. Also that same day, he vetoed SB 906, which would specify that no priest, minister, rabbi, or authorized person of any religious denomination would be required to solemnize a marriage that is contrary to the tenets of their faith. The bill would state that any refusal to solemnize a marriage under that provision shall not affect the tax exempt status of any entity.
