= Domestic Partner Task Force =

The Domestic Partner Task Force was a governmental body established in 1983 by the Californian City of Berkeley's Human Relations and Welfare Commission to draw up the structure of the city's (and, eventually, the state's) domestic partnership program. Leland Traiman, then the vice-chair of the HRWC and a gay rights activist, was appointed as leader of the Task Force.

Working with gay rights activist Tom Brougham, members of the East Bay Lesbian/Gay Democratic Club, and attorney Matt Coles, the Domestic Partner Task Force drafted what has become the template for domestic partner/civil union policies around the world. Brougham is credited with coining the term "domestic partnership" to refer to a non-marriage union between two partners.

== Prior to 1984 ==
According to Traiman, Brougham's idea was conceived when, as an employee of the City of Berkeley in 1979, he realized that he could not sign his life partner, Barry Warren, for health and dental benefits because they were available only to the married spouses of city employees. The prior year, Berkeley became the first municipality to pass an anti-discrimination ordinance which included sexual orientation as a protected class, offering Brougham a potential legal basis for gaining the benefits for his partner.

Two letters by written by Brougham to a colleague and dated August 21, 1979 set the basis for his future endeavors. In the first, he addressed the issue of marriage as the sole vehicle for the claiming of benefits by government employees for their spouses and partners, and in the second, he proposed that Berkeley could solve its dilemma by enacting what he called "domestic partnerships" in order to allow same-sex couples employee benefits which were separate from marriage:

Initially, the affidavit had three requirements: “1) She/he would be qualified to marry the employee but for the fact that she/he is the same gender as the employee; 2) she/he resides with the employee; and 3) she/he is declared as the sole domestic partner of the employee.” Over the next several years, two additional points were added: a requirement of mutual financial responsibility, and a rule that both persons be at least eighteen years of age and able to enter into a legal contract.

— Leland Traiman, A Brief History of Domestic Partnerships

Brougham and Warren, the latter of whom was an employee of University of California, Berkeley, brought their proposals to the City of Berkeley and the University of California.

== Early legislative history in San Francisco ==
In 1982, Brougham's definition was modified by San Francisco Supervisor Harry Britt, a gay man appointed to replace Harvey Milk. Britt was in attendance at a presentation by Brougham and Warren to a meeting of California gay student unions, and was inspired by the idea. Britt's version was adopted and passed by the San Francisco Board of Supervisors, but Dianne Feinstein, mayor of San Francisco at the time, came under intense pressure from the Catholic Church and vetoed the bill in 1983.

This became a source of animosity within the LGBT community in San Francisco, and hundreds signed the White Panthers' recall petition against Feinstein, putting her mayoralty to a recall election. Feinstein won with 70%, but the anger felt by the defeat of Britt's proposal led to the establishment of the EBG/LDC and increased LGBT political activism in the city.

In 1982, the term "domestic partner" was first used in a lawsuit filed by San Francisco Human Rights Commission employee Larry Brinkin. Brinkin, then an employee of Southern Pacific Railway, had recently suffered the loss of his partner of eleven years. When he was denied the three days of paid bereavement leave given to married employees, he filed suit with the assistance of the ACLU. Mr. Brinkin lost his case. Despite a great deal of evidence to the contrary, the judge agreed with his employer's claim that there was no way to know if his relationship was legitimate.

== Early legislative history in Berkeley ==
The HRWC held a public hearing early in 1984 on "Examining the Use of Marriage to Determine Benefits and Liabilities in Berkeley and the Alternatives." The DPTF's policy, as co-authored by Brougham, Traiman and others on the Task Force, was adopted by the commission and presented to the City Council. A copy was sent to the Berkeley School Board. In July 1984 the City Council voted down the proposal citing financial concerns. On August 1, 1984, the Berkeley School Board enacted the policy by a 4 to 1 vote. The school board motion was made by board member and community activist Ethel Manheimer.

In November 1984, all the city council members up for election who had voted against the policy lost reelection. Progressives from the Berkeley Citizens' Action (BCA) slate who replaced them had voiced strong support for a domestic partner policy. The East Bay Lesbian/Gay Democratic Club had worked hard to elect the BCA Slate. This was the first time domestic partners was a campaign issue. At the first meeting of the new City Council in December 1984, the Berkeley City Council enacted a policy extending employee benefits to unmarried couples of any gender. The first couple to file for benefits under Berkeley's sex-neutral policy were Brougham and his partner Barry Warren.

== Domestic partnership registries ==
In June 1985 in West Hollywood, city council member John Heilman successfully introduced domestic partner legislation for city residents and employees that was passed by the city council and created the first domestic partnership registry. West Hollywood, which has a large LGBT population and heavily-Democratic political orientation, had incorporated in December of the prior year.

In 1989, San Francisco became the second polity to a domestic partnership registry law. However, voters repealed the domestic partnership law by initiative; a modified version was reinstated by another voter initiative, 1990's Proposition K, also written by Britt. Currently, the city still offers a domestic partnership status separate and differing in benefits from that offered by the state; city residents can apply for both.

In June 1991, Berkeley became the third polity in the state to create a domestic partnership registry. On October 11 of that year, 28 lesbian and gay male couples and one heterosexual couple registered their partnerships. The registry and benefits were also extended to non-resident couples that same year.

From that point on, municipal legislative efforts to create domestic partnership registries for same- and opposite-sex couples increased, with the following polities following suit:

- City of Laguna Beach (April 1992)
- City of Sacramento (October 1992)
- Marin County (May 1993)
- City of Davis (May 1994)
- Santa Monica (September 1995)
- Palo Alto (January 1996)
- Oakland (June 1996)
- City of Santa Barbara (June 1997)
- Cathedral City (September 1997)
- Arcata (August 1998)
- City of Los Angeles (May 1999)
- Santa Barbara County (June 1999)
- Petaluma, California (June 1999)
- City of Long Beach (1999)
- Palm Springs (2000)

== Domestic partnerships statewide ==
Domestic partnerships were signed into law by Gray Davis on September 26, 1999, creating a statewide registry for same- and opposite-sex couples.

== Domestic partnership benefits by non-governmental bodies ==
After San Francisco and Berkeley had passed their domestic partnership registry laws, American companies also began to offer corporate benefits to LGBT employees, including domestic partnership benefits. In 1992, Lotus Development became the first major corporation in the United States to offer such benefits to employees.

Also in 1992, Stanford and the University of Chicago both offered domestic partnership benefits to staff, faculty and students.
