= California Insurance Equality Act =

State law on insurance coverage

The California Insurance Equality Act (AB 2208) is a state law that requires California insurance providers and managed care plans (HMOs) to provide coverage for registered domestic partners that is equal to spousal coverage. The law complements the California Domestic Partnership Rights and Responsibilities Act of 2003 (AB 205), which grants registered domestic partners most of the same rights and responsibilities under California law as they belong to married couples.

== Impact ==
Prior to enactment of AB 2208, California law required insurance providers to provide benefits to domestic partners as dependents. The California Insurance Equality Act now requires domestic partners to be covered as spouses. The act also prohibits employers from asking for more proof of partnership of domestic partners than they ask of spouses. This Act should render insurance benefits payable to domestic partners more easily, without reference to inconsistent and confusing statutory and case law definitions of what constitutes a "dependent" under California law. The act also prohibits employers from asking for more proof of partnership of domestic partners than they ask of spouses. However, some types of employee benefit plans are exempt from the law.
