= Don Korotsky Norte =

American gay rights political activist

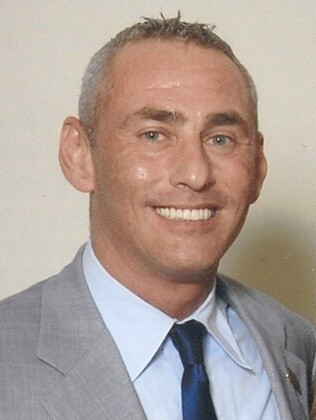
- Norte in 2006
- Born: Don Korotsky; 1961 or 1962 (age 63–64)
- Education: Montclair State University; New York University
- Spouse: Kevin Norte (m. 2008)

Don Korotsky Norte (born 1961/1962) is an American gay rights political activist. Norte's career covers over thirty years of public service with federal, state, and local government, including the Department of Defense, the General Services Administration, and the New York State Department of Parks, Recreation and Historic Preservation.

== Early life and education ==
Norte received a Bachelor of Arts in geography from Montclair State University and master's degree of urban planning from New York University.

Norte began dating his husband Kevin Norte, a high school classmate, in 1978. They married on June 28, 2008, in California, 30 years after their first date.

== Career ==
Norte is a city planner. He worked for West Hollywood's Department of Transportation and Public Works between 1990 and 2017. Norte joined the Los Angeles County Metropolitan Transportation Authority's management team in 2017. He and his husband marched in the City of Los Angeles LGBTQ Pride Parade in Hollywood in 2022.

In 2004, Norte was involved in the Bobby Shriver for Santa Monica City Council Campaign.

Norte has served on the board of directors and later as president of the California Public Parking Association.

== Log Cabin Republicans ==
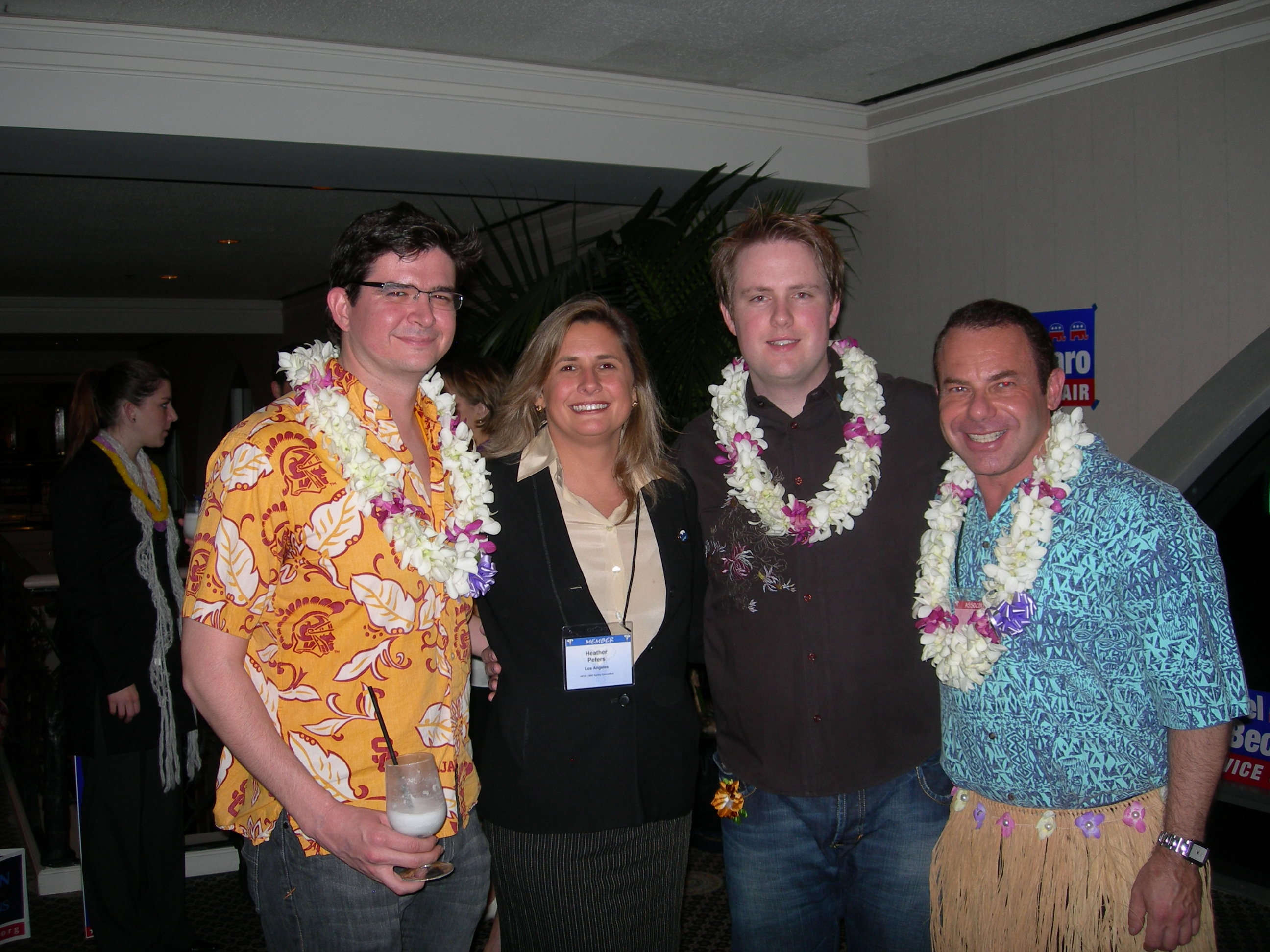
(l-r) BoiFromTroy Conservative Blogger Scott Schmidt, California Secretary of Business Regulations Heather Peters, Log Cabin Republicans - Los Angeles President Charles Moran, & LCR-CA-PAC Board Member Kevin Norte at the California State Republican Convention.

=== Arnold Schwarzenegger ===
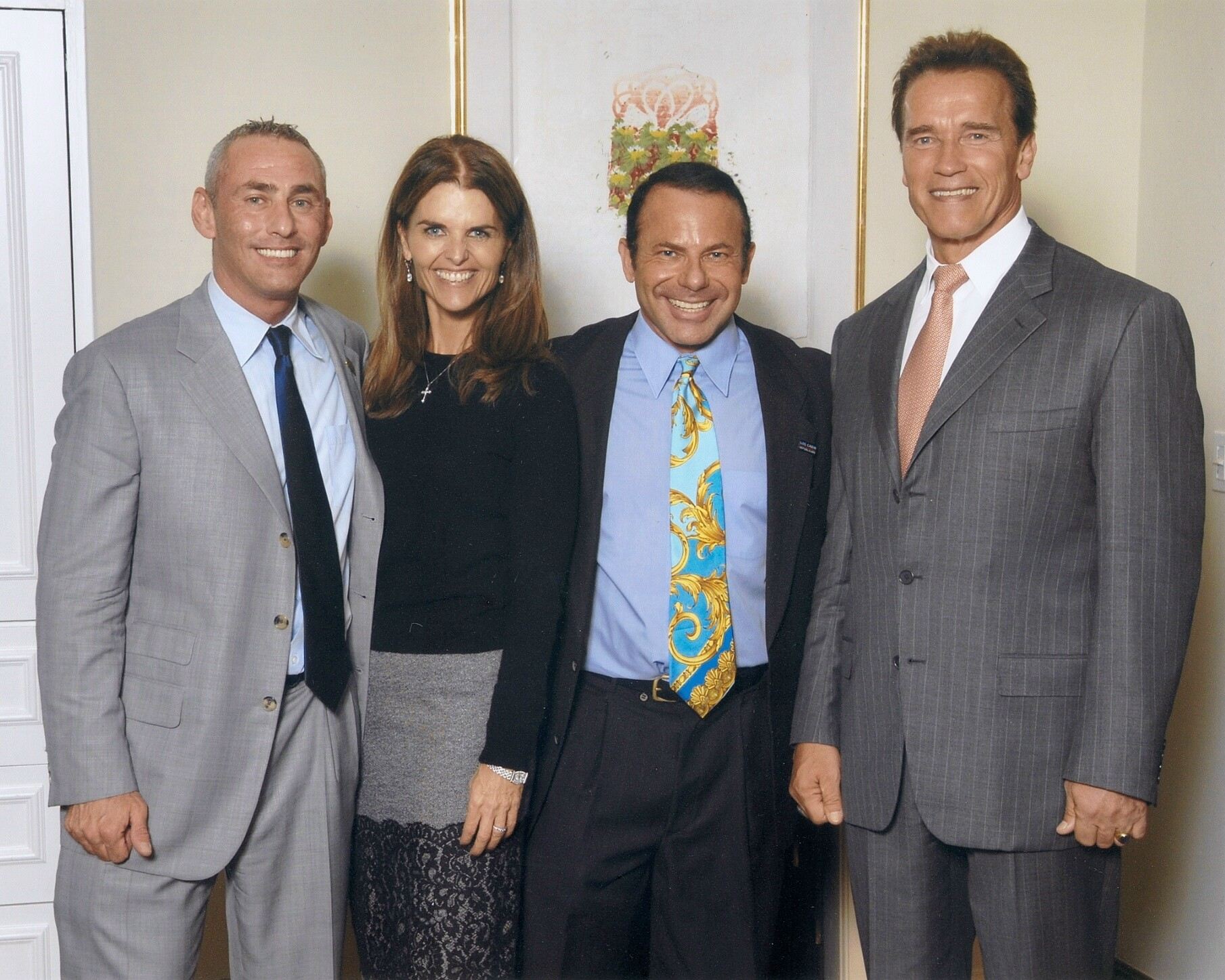
Don Norte, Maria Shriver, Kevin Norte, and Governor Arnold Schwarzenegger at the Hotel Bel-Air in 2006.

In 2007, Governor Arnold Schwarzenegger appointed Norte to the Governor's Committee on Employment of People with Disabilities.

On April 11, 2008, Governor Schwarzenegger officially announced his opposition to the Initiative at LCR's National Convention. At Log Cabin's 2009 convention, Kevin Norte received the group's "Grassroots Leader Award". In May 2010, the couple represented LCR at the Long Beach Gay & Lesbian Pride Festival.

=== Resignation ===
During the last days of the 2012 Presidential election, when Log Cabin Republicans announced their last minute endorsement of Mitt Romney, the Nortes resigned from Log Cabin Republicans and changed their political affiliation.

== Context of same sex couples taking one name in California ==
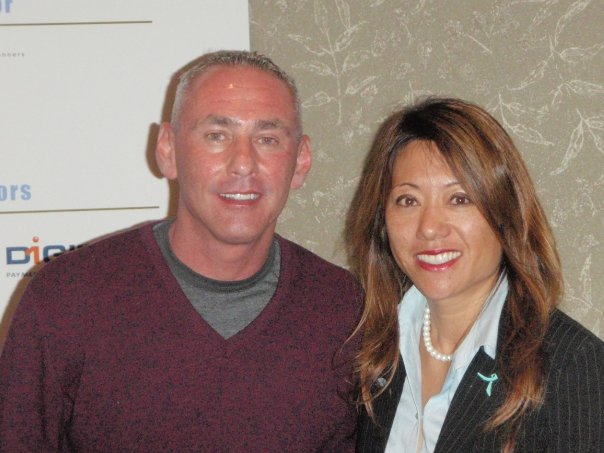
Remaining Schwarzenegger appointee Don Norte and California Assembly Speaker Pro Tempore Fiona Ma.

Norte tested California's "Domestic Partnership" law that promised equality except for the word "marriage" in 2005 by attempting to change his last name to test the applicability of AB 205. That law was intended to match the rights of domestic partnerships to married couples. The language provided in California Family Code § 297.5 (a), reads as follows:

Registered domestic partners shall have the same rights, duties, protections, and benefits, and shall be subject to the same responsibilities, obligations, and duties under law, whether derived from statutes, administrative regulations, court rules, government policies, common law, or any other provisions or sources of law, as are granted to and imposed upon spouses.

During the Legislative Session 2006–07, California AB 102 was drafted by San Francisco Assemblymember Fiona Ma after the Norte's legal name status was called into question after the CA DMV adopted a policy to intentionally block other domestic partners after the Nortes from applying the California Family Code in a similar manner. The Nortes' involvement was mentioned in the description of a George Takei interview on Larry King.

AB 102 expanded on the concept of allowing domestic partners to take the name of a spouse, to include married couples so the husband would have the right to assume the last name of the wife. AB 102 was inclusive and consistent with Fam. Code § 297.5 by addressing marriages of different or the same genders. Name changes processed for domestic partners after AB 205 and prior to AB 102 originally permitted individuals to proceed with subsequent name change actions, including social security and passport documents. AB 102 passed the Assembly with three Republican votes: Sam Blakeslee, Roger Niello, and Anthony Adams. It passed the Senate on a straight party vote.

The reaction from opponents was swift after the Governor signed the bill. "AB 102 allows homosexual couples to hold themselves out as married by permitting them to choose the same surname upon registration of their 'domestic partnership,'" said Randy Thomasson, president of Campaign for Children and Families. The bill granted unmarried couples married last names. "Schwarzenegger and the Democrat politicians have created the public image of homosexual "marriages" in California," said Thomasson in response to the signing of AB 102. "It's hypocritical for Arnold Schwarzenegger to veto homosexual "'marriage'" licenses and at the very same time aggressively promote the public image of gay and lesbian "'marriages'" in every community for every child to see." Nortes' position on their name was resolved in the 2006-07 legislative session when AB 102 was signed into law by the Governor because the law was made retroactive.

== See also ==
- Tom Brougham
