= Domestic partnership in California =

A California domestic partnership is a legal relationship, analogous to marriage, created in 1999 to extend the rights and benefits of marriage to same-sex couples (and opposite-sex couples where both parties were over 62). It was extended to all opposite-sex couples as of January 1, 2016 and by January 1, 2020 to include new votes that updated SB-30 with more benefits and rights to California couples choosing domestic partnership before their wedding. California Governor Newsom signed into law on July 30, 2019.

Domestic partnerships legally afford couples who choose not to marry "the same rights, protections, and benefits, and... the same responsibilities, obligations, and duties under law..." as married spouses.

Enacted in 1999, the domestic partnership registry was the first of its kind in the United States created by a legislature without court intervention. Initially, domestic partnerships enjoyed very few privileges—principally just hospital-visitation rights and the right to be claimed as a next of kin of the estate of a deceased partner. The legislature has since expanded the scope of California domestic partnerships to include all of the rights and responsibilities common to marriage. As such, California domestic partnerships are functionally equivalent to civil unions offered in several other states.

Filing an invalid California Declaration of Domestic Partnership is a serious offense and considered a misdemeanor.

Although the program enjoys broad support in California, it has been the source of some controversy. Groups opposed to the recognition of same-sex families have challenged the expansion of domestic partnerships in court. Conversely, advocates of same-sex marriage contend that anything less than full marriage rights extended to same-sex partners is analogous to the "separate but equal" racial laws of the Jim Crow era.

== Specifics ==
California has expanded the scope or modified some of the processes in domestic partnerships in every legislative session since the legislature first created the registry. Consult the California Secretary of State for the most current information.

=== Scope ===
As of 2012, California affords domestic partnerships the same rights and responsibilities as marriages under state law. Among these:

- Making health care decisions for each other in certain circumstances
- Hospital and jail visitation rights that were previously reserved for family members related by blood, adoption or marriage to the sick, injured or incarcerated person.
- Access to family health insurance plans (Cal. Ins. Code §10121.7)
- Spousal insurance policies (auto, life, homeowners etc..), this applies to all forms of insurance through the California Insurance Equality Act (Cal. Ins. Code §381.5)
- Sick care and similar family leave
- Stepparent adoption procedures
- Presumption that both members of the partnership are the parents of a child born into the partnership
- Suing for wrongful death of a domestic partner
- Rights involving wills, intestate succession, conservatorships and trusts
- The same property tax provisions otherwise available only to married couples (Cal. R&T Code §62p)
- Access to some survivor pension benefits
- Supervision of the Superior Court of California over dissolution and nullity proceedings
- The obligation to file state tax returns as a married couple (260k) commencing with the 2007 tax year (Cal R&T Code §18521d)
- The right for either partner to take the other partner's surname after registration
- Community property rights and responsibilities previously only available to married spouses
- The right to request partner support (alimony) upon dissolution of the partnership (divorce)
- The same parental rights and responsibilities granted to and imposed upon spouses in a marriage
- The right to claim inheritance rights as a putative partner (equivalent to the rights given to heterosexual couples under the putative spouse doctrine) when one partner believes himself or herself to have entered into a domestic partnership in good faith and is given legal rights as a result of his or her reliance upon this belief.

=== Differences from marriage ===
While domestic partners receive all of the benefits of marriage under California state law, federal law does not recognize domestic partnerships. In addition, some countries that recognize same-sex marriages performed in California as valid in their own country (e.g., Israel) do not recognize same-sex domestic partnerships contracted in California.

The use of the word marriage itself constitutes a significant social difference compared to domestic partnership, and in the majority opinion of In re Marriage Cases, the California Supreme Court agreed, suggesting an analogy with a hypothetical that branded interracial marriages "transracial unions".

A 2010 UCLA study published in the journal Health Affairs suggests various inequities (including "Inequities in marriage laws") might have "implications for who bears the burden of health care costs." That study finds that men in same-sex domestic partnerships in California are only 42% as likely to receive dependent coverage for their partners as their married peers, and that women in same-sex domestic partnerships in California are only 28% as likely to receive that coverage.

=== Eligibility ===
Currently, a couple wishing to register as domestic partners in California must meet the following requirements:

1. Neither person is married to someone else or is a member of another domestic partnership with someone else that has not been terminated, dissolved, or adjudged a nullity.
2. The two persons are not related by blood in a way that would prevent them from being married to each other in this state.
3. Both persons are at least 18 years of age, except as provided in Section 297.1.
4. Both persons are capable of consenting to the domestic partnership.

If a couple wishes to establish a confidential domestic partnership, both partners are required to share a common residence. There is no longer a common residence requirement for couples wishing to establish a standard (non-confidential) domestic partnership.

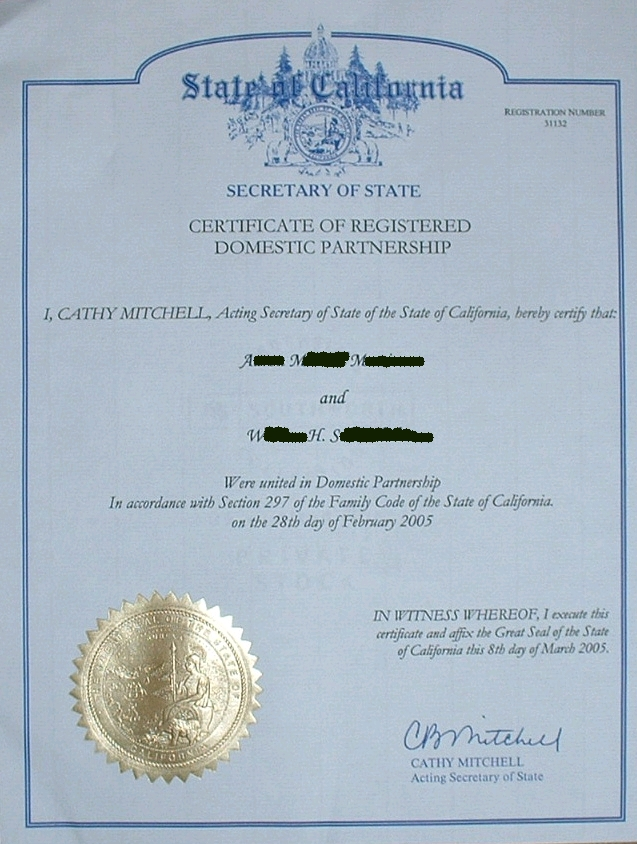
Example of California domestic partnership certificate

=== Recognition of out-of-state same-sex unions ===
- A substantially similar legal union lawfully contracted by a same-sex couple in another state or foreign jurisdiction will be recognized as a domestic partnership in California. For example, a domestic partnership in both Nevada and Oregon next door, a civil union in New Jersey, a civil union in Hawaii, a civil union in Colorado, a civil union in Illinois or a civil partnership in the United Kingdom would qualify as a domestic partnership in California.
- A substantially weaker legal union contracted by any couple in another state or foreign jurisdiction may not qualify as a domestic partnership in California. A domestic partnership in Wisconsin would, in all likelihood, fail to qualify as a domestic partnership in California.
- For opposite-sex couples, a civil union or domestic partnership contracted in another state or foreign jurisdiction will, in all likelihood, be honored as a domestic partnership in California if at least one partner is 62 years of age or older. However, if both partners are under age 62, the union will likely be void and of no legal effect in California. For example, Colorado, Hawaii and Illinois afford all opposite-sex couples over 18 years old the right to establish civil unions, and Nevada allows opposite-sex couples over 18 years old to establish domestic partnerships; such unions in these states are functionally equivalent to marriage. But, California will only recognize these unions if at least one of the opposite-sex partners is 62 years of age or older.
- Same-sex marriages are not recognized as domestic partnerships in California. Prior to June 28, 2013, a two-tiered system of same-sex marriage recognition existed in California:
1. A same-sex marriage lawfully performed in another state or foreign jurisdiction on or before November 4, 2008 was fully recognized and legally designated as marriage in California. This also applied to all lawful out-of-state and foreign same-sex marriages performed before California began granting marriage licenses to same-sex couples on June 17, 2008.
2. A same-sex marriage lawfully performed in another state or foreign jurisdiction on or after November 5, 2008 was fully recognized in California, but Proposition 8 precluded California from designating these relationships with the word "marriage." These couples were afforded every single one of the legal rights, benefits, and obligations of marriage.

On June 28, 2013, same-sex marriage resumed in California. A law enacted on July 7, 2014 ensures that same-sex marriages lawfully concluded out-of-state after November 4, 2008 are designated as such.

=== Registration ===
Domestic partner registration is an uncomplicated process, more simple and less costly than entering into a marriage. Both parties must sign a declaration listing their names and address. Both signatures must be notarized. The declaration must then be transmitted to the Secretary of State along with a $10 filing fee (plus an additional $23 fee for couples under age 62, to help fund LGBT-specific domestic violence training and services). In this regard it is not like a marriage or civil union. Those unions require a ceremony, solemnized by either religious clergy or civil officials, to be deemed valid.

=== Dissolution ===
In most cases, a domestic partnership must be dissolved through filing a court action identical to an action for dissolution of marriage. In limited circumstances, however, a filing with the Secretary of State may suffice. This procedure is available when the domestic partnership has not been in force for more than five years. The couple must also meet many other requirements that the dissolution be both simple and uncontested: no children (or current pregnancy) within the relationship, no real estate (including certain leases), and little joint property or debt. The parties must also review materials prepared by the Secretary of State, execute an agreement dividing assets and liability, and waive claims to domestic partner support. Where all the requirements are met, the partnership will terminate six months after the filing, unless either party revokes consent.

=== Recognition in other jurisdictions ===
On September 28, 2012, the Massachusetts Supreme Judicial Court ruled in that "Because the parties to California [registered domestic partnerships] have rights and responsibilities identical to those of marriage", it is proper to treat such relationships "as equivalent to marriage" in Massachusetts. The context was a child custody dispute between two women in a California domestic partnership.

States which have civil unions or domestic partnership registries affording substantially similar legal protections generally recognize California domestic partnerships.

== Legislative history ==
=== Attempts at the municipal level ===
The term "domestic partnership" was allegedly coined by Berkeley municipal employee Tom Brougham in an August 1979 letter, and both he and his partner put forward a proposal for creating this lower tier of legal relationship recognition for employee benefits to the Berkeley City Council and University of California, Berkeley. Their proposal would be adopted by San Francisco Supervisor Harry Britt.

In 1982, the San Francisco Board of Supervisors passed Britt's measure to extend health insurance coverage to domestic partners of public employees, largely because of the reaction to the early days of AIDS, but did not provide for a registry available to the general public. Mayor Dianne Feinstein vetoed the measure. Eventually San Francisco and other communities, such as Berkeley, and some local agencies enacted a similar measure.

In December 1984, Berkeley was the first city to pass a domestic partner policy for city and school district employees after a year of work by the Domestic Partner Task Force chaired by Leland Traiman. Working with the Task Force was Tom Brougham, a Berkeley city employee who coined the term "domestic partner" and created the concept. All other domestic partner policies are patterned after Berkeley's.

In 1985, West Hollywood became the first US city to enact a domestic partnership registry open to all citizens. Eventually other cities, such as San Francisco, Berkeley, and Santa Cruz, followed suit.

Despite successes in a handful of localities, supporters of legal recognition same-sex couples could not overcome the limited geographical scope and relatively modest range of programs administered at the county and city level. In the 1990s, they turned their attention to the state legislature.

=== Early attempts in the state legislature ===
Mirroring the experience of California's local efforts, the state legislature did not initially succeed in providing health insurance coverage for domestic partners or creating a domestic partner registry for the general public.

- September 1994: Governor Pete Wilson vetoes a bill that would have legalized domestic partnerships in the state.
- Assembly Bill 627 of 1995: In 1995, Assemblymember Richard Katz introduced a bill to create a domestic partner registry, open to both same- and opposite-sex couples. It sought to provide limited rights in medical decision making, conservatorships and a few related matters. It died in committee.
- Murray-Katz Domestic Partnership Act of 1997: At the beginning of the 1997–1998 legislative session Assemblymember Kevin Murray introduced Assembly Bill 54. It was similar to Assembly Bill 627 of 1995. After successfully negotiating two Assembly committees, Murray did not bring the bill to a vote on the Assembly floor.
- Assembly Bill 1059 of 1997: In 1997, Assemblymember Carole Migden introduced a bill that would require health insurance companies to offer for sale policies that would cover domestic partners of the insured, but did not require employers to provide the coverage. As later amended, it required employers who cover employees’ dependents to cover their domestic partners as well. The amended bill eventually gained approval of the legislature, but Governor Pete Wilson vetoed the measure.
- Domestic Partnership Act of 1999: Kevin Murray, now a state senator, introduced Senate Bill 75 in December 1998. It was largely identical to his Assembly Bill 54 of 1997 and ultimately passed both houses of the state legislature. Governor Gray Davis vetoed the bill in favor of Assembly Bill 26, which was narrower in scope.

=== Establishment and incremental expansion ===
==== Assembly Bill 26 of 1999 ====
Simultaneously with the Domestic Partnership Act of 1999, Assemblymember Carole Migden introduced Assembly Bill 26 of 1999. As originally drafted, it covered all adult couples, like its unsuccessful senate counterpart. Before bringing the bill to the Assembly floor, however, Migden narrowed its scope. Based on objections from Governor Gray Davis, who did not want a competing alternative to marriage for opposite-sex couples, Migden eliminated coverage for opposite-sex couples where either participant was less than 62 years of age. The bill passed, and Davis approved it on October 2, 1999. It provided for a public registry, hospital visitation rights, and authorized health insurance coverage for domestic partners of public employees. While modest in scope, Assembly Bill 26 marked the first time a state legislature created a domestic partnership statute without the intervention of the courts. (Hawaii's legislature enacted a more expansive reciprocal beneficiaries scheme in 1997 in response to an unfavorable lower court ruling; Vermont enacted a sweeping civil union bill in 2000 at the direction of its state Supreme Court.)

==== Assembly Bill 25 of 2001 ====
In the first successful expansion of the domestic partnership act, Assemblymembers Carole Migden and Robert Hertzberg, joined by state Senator Sheila Kuehl, introduced a bill that added 18 new rights to the domestic partnership scheme. It also relaxed the requirements for opposite-sex couples, requiring only one of the participants to be over 62 years of age. The expanded rights included standing to sue (for emotional distress or wrongful death), stepparent adoption, a variety of conservatorship rights, the right to make health care decisions for an incapacitated partner, certain rights regarding distribution of a deceased partner's estate, limited taxpayer rights, sick leave to care for partners, and unemployment and disability insurance benefits. Governor Gray Davis signed the bill into law on October 22, 2001.

==== Other bills in the 2001–2002 legislative session ====
During the 2001–2002 session, California enacted five more bills making minor changes:

- Senate Bill 1049 (Speier) permitted San Mateo County to provide survivor benefits to domestic partners.
- Assembly Bill 2216 (Keeley) provided for intestate succession.
- Assembly Bill 2777 (Nation) authorized Los Angeles, Santa Barbara and Marin counties to provide survivor benefits to domestic partners.
- Senate Bill 1575 (Sher) exempts domestic partners from certain provisions voiding wills that they helped draft.
- Senate Bill 1661 (Kuehl) extends temporary disability benefits to workers to take time off to care for a family member.

=== Wholesale expansion ===
The introduction of The California Domestic Partner Rights and Responsibilities Act of 2003 (or Assembly Bill 205 of 2003) marked a major shift in the legislature's approach to domestic partnerships. Earlier efforts afforded domestic partners only certain enumerated rights, which the legislature expanded in piecemeal fashion. This bill, introduced by Assemblymembers Jackie Goldberg, Christine Kehoe, Paul Koretz, John Laird, and Mark Leno, created the presumption that domestic partners were to have all of the rights and responsibilities afforded spouses under state law. The bill did carve out certain exceptions to this premise, principally involving the creation and dissolution of domestic partnerships and certain tax issues. It also, for the first time, recognized similar relationships, such as civil unions, created in other states. Because the legislation dramatically changed the circumstances of existing domestic partnerships, the legislature directed the Secretary of State to inform all previously registered domestic partnerships of the changes and delayed the effect of the law for an additional year, until January 1, 2005. Governor Gray Davis signed the bill into law on September 19, 2003.

=== Subsequent changes and clarifications ===
Since enacting The California Domestic Partner Rights and Responsibilities Act of 2003, the legislature has passed several bills aimed at clarifying how certain spousal provisions should be treated in the context of domestic partnerships and made some modest changes. This subsequent legislation includes:

- Assembly Bill 2208 of 2004 (Kehoe) clarifies that health and disability-insurance providers must treat domestic partners the same as married spouses.
- Senate Bill 565 of 2005 (Migden) allows transfer of property between domestic partners without reassessment for tax purposes.
- Senate Bill 973 of 2005 (Kuehl) specifies that domestic partners of state workers are entitled to retroactive pension benefits, even if the worker entered retirement before the enactment of Assembly Bill 205.
- Senate Bill 1827 of 2006 (Migden) requires domestic partners to file state income-tax returns under the same status as married couples (jointly or married filing separately), effective in the 2007 tax year.
- Assembly Bill 2051 of 2006 (Cohn) creates programs and funding grants to reduce domestic violence in the LGBT community and increases the fee for registering a domestic partnership by $23 to fund these services. The new fees are effective January 1, 2007.
- Assembly Bill 102 of 2007 (Ma) allows parties to a registered domestic partnership to legally change their name to include the last name of their partner.
- Assembly Bill 2055 of 2010 (De La Torre) extends unemployment benefits to same-sex couples planning to enter into a domestic partnership if one of the partners loses his or her job.
- Senate Bill 651 of 2011 (Leno) harmonizes domestic partnership eligibility requirements with those of marriage, which includes the option of establishing a confidential domestic partnership.
- Senate Bill 757 of 2011 (Lieu) requires out-of-state insurance providers selling their products in California to provide the same coverage to domestic partners as they do to married couples.

=== Expansion to include opposite-sex couples of any age ===
As of January 1, 2020, Senate Bill 30 of 2019 (Wiener) removes the requirement that persons be of the same sex or of the opposite sex and over 62 years of age in order to enter into a domestic partnership, allowing all opposite-sex couples to enter domestic partnerships as an alternative to marriage. According to the author of the bill, Scott Wiener, "Senate Bill 30 expands Californians' options to enter into legally protected relationships. In modern life, people make all sorts of relationship choices reflecting their values, commitments, and long-term plans. SB 30 removes discriminatory barriers for couples who wish to become domestic partners and recognizes and respects their relationship choices. Not everyone in California wants to be married, but many do want their relationships and families to be recognized and have legal protections. This bill enables people's freedom to make choices about their own relationships."

== Public opinion ==
California public opinion has long supported legal protections for same-sex couples. In early 1997, two and half years before any statewide recognition occurred, polls showed two-thirds of Californians supported the limited provisions in unsuccessful bills debated in the legislature at the time. There was also strong support (59 percent) for broader provisions (pension, health, leave and survivor benefits) that weren't enacted until more than four years later.

Polls consistently show a marked contrast between support for domestic partnerships and same-sex marriage. In 1997, roughly 38 percent of Californians supported same-sex marriage. More polls show an increase in support for same-sex marriage, but few polls suggest that there is any more support for same-sex marriage than a statistical tie with opponents. On November 4, 2008, Californians voted, 52.2% to 47.8%, to eliminate the right of same sex couples to marry. However, a recent 2012 poll showed vast increase in support of same sex marriage with 59% of Californians supporting same sex marriage and 80% supporting legal recognition of same sex couples. The 2012 poll found for the first time a majority support for same-sex marriage when non-marriage domestic partnerships were presented as an option.

== Challenges to domestic partnerships ==
Despite broad support, California's domestic partnership program has engendered opposition.

=== Referendum ===
California law provides for referendums, petition drives that would place any legislative enactment on the ballot for review. Following the passage of The California Domestic Partner Rights and Responsibilities Act of 2003, state senator William "Pete" Knight (author of the successful Proposition 22 initiative) and Assemblymember Ray Haynes sought to put the new legislation to a popular vote. The referendum failed to qualify for the ballot.

=== Litigation ===
Opponents of legal recognition for same-sex couples filed two lawsuits in the Superior Court of California. In the first case, state senator William "Pete" Knight sued Governor Gray Davis (later substituting Governor Arnold Schwarzenegger) on the grounds that A.B. 205 impermissibly amended Proposition 22, which Knight authored. Randy Thomasson (an opponent of gay rights and head of the Campaign for California Families) filed a similar lawsuit, which challenged both A.B. 205 and the earlier domestic-partner expansion in A.B. 25. Both lawsuits, consolidated into a single action, failed at the trial and appellate courts. In the wake of those decisions, opponents of legal recognition for LGBT families launched at least two recall efforts against Judge Loren McMaster, who presided over the trial-court hearings. The recall efforts also failed.

Along similar legal lines, defendants in a wrongful-death action brought by the survivor of a domestic partnership mounted a defense based partly on the ground that the legislative enactments giving a domestic partner standing to sue for wrongful death ran afoul of Proposition 22 (among other defenses). That defense failed on appeal.

Proponents of same-sex marriage, including the City and County of San Francisco, have challenged the state's opposite-sex marriage requirements on constitutional grounds. In pursuing these claims, the plaintiffs argue that even the broad protections of California's domestic partnership scheme constitute a "separate but unequal" discriminatory framework. In May 2008, the Supreme Court of California ruled in their favor in In re Marriage Cases, overruling Proposition 22 and effectively legalizing same-sex marriage in California.

=== Constitutional amendments ===
Immediately following the passage of The California Domestic Partner Rights and Responsibilities Act of 2003, a petition drive began to amend the California Constitution to forbid any recognition—including domestic partnerships—of same sex relationships. The measure failed to qualify for the ballot.

For a month in early 2004, San Francisco issued marriage licenses to same-sex couples. The Supreme Court of California halted that process and later declared the marriages void. Regardless, four separate groups began petition drives to amend the California Constitution to prevent same-sex marriage and repeal domestic-partnership rights. The renewed efforts peaked in 2005, but have continued since. These groups have filed a total of 20 petitions, but none of the proposed amendments has qualified for the ballot.

In 2008, two of these groups moved to qualify ballot initiatives to amend the California Constitution on the November 2008 ballot. One qualified as Proposition 8. The amendment eliminates the right of same-sex couples to marry, but does not repeal any rights granted to domestic partnerships and registration for domestic partnerships remains legal in California. In late 2008, Proposition 8 was passed by the voters, in 2009, the legality of Proposition 8 was upheld by the California Supreme Court in Strauss v. Horton holding that same-sex couples have all the rights of heterosexual couples, except the right to the "designation" of marriage and that such a holding does not violate California's privacy, equal protection, or due process laws; the In re Marriage Cases still apply. Proposition 8 then was challenged in federal court on August 4, 2010 in the Perry v. Schwarzenegger trial, as it was found to have violated the Due Process and Equal Protection Clauses of the 14th Amendment of the Federal Constitution.

== Internal Revenue Service Ruling ==
In late May 2010, the Internal Revenue Service reversed a 2006 ruling, and declared that, with respect to community property, domestic partners in California must be treated the same as heterosexual couples due to a change to the California community property tax law in 2007. The IRS ruled the approximately 58,000 couples who are registered as domestic partners in California must combine their income for federal tax purposes, and then each report half of the total income and half of the total withholdings on their separate tax returns. If one of the partners makes significantly more than the other, the net result is a lower tax obligation for the couple. In December 2010, the Internal Revenue Service issued a revised edition of its Publication 555, Community Property, explicitly applying this ruling to registered domestic partners in Nevada as well, the other community property states with such registries, as well as, in California, both registered domestic partners and same-sex couples recognized by the state as married.
