= Mercury Park Lane =

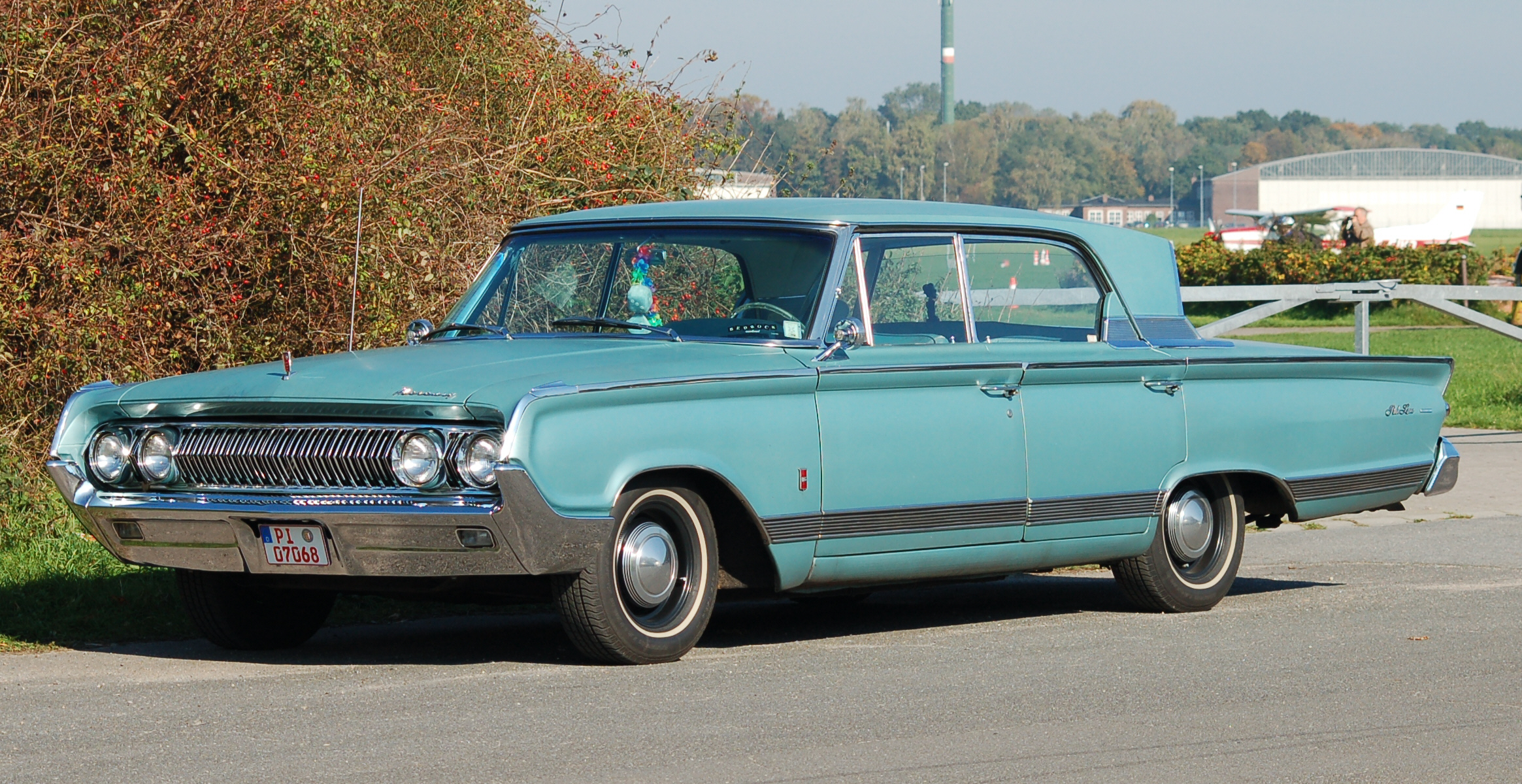
- 1964 Mercury Park Lane four-door hardtop (with Breezeway Design roofline)

Overview
- Manufacturer: Mercury (Ford)
- Production: 1958–1960; 1964–1968

Body and chassis
- Class: Full-size
- Layout: FR layout

The Mercury Park Lane is a full-sized automobile that was produced by the Mercury division of Ford Motor Company. While not officially introduced as the replacement of the Mercury Turnpike Cruiser, the Park Lane became the flagship of the Mercury model line upon its introduction. The second-generation Park Lane was positioned above the Mercury Montclair.

In 1969, the Mercury Marquis was expanded to a full model line and replaced the Park Lane in the Mercury range.

== First use of name ==
In 1956, the Park Lane name was used by the Ford Division as it created a two-door station wagon intended as a competitor for the Chevrolet Nomad. Based on the Ford Fairlane, the Ford Parklane (spelled as a single word) outsold the Nomad nearly two-to-one, though Ford marketers felt the vehicle had missed its target market; it was discontinued after its only year of production.

== First generation (1958–1960) ==
First generation
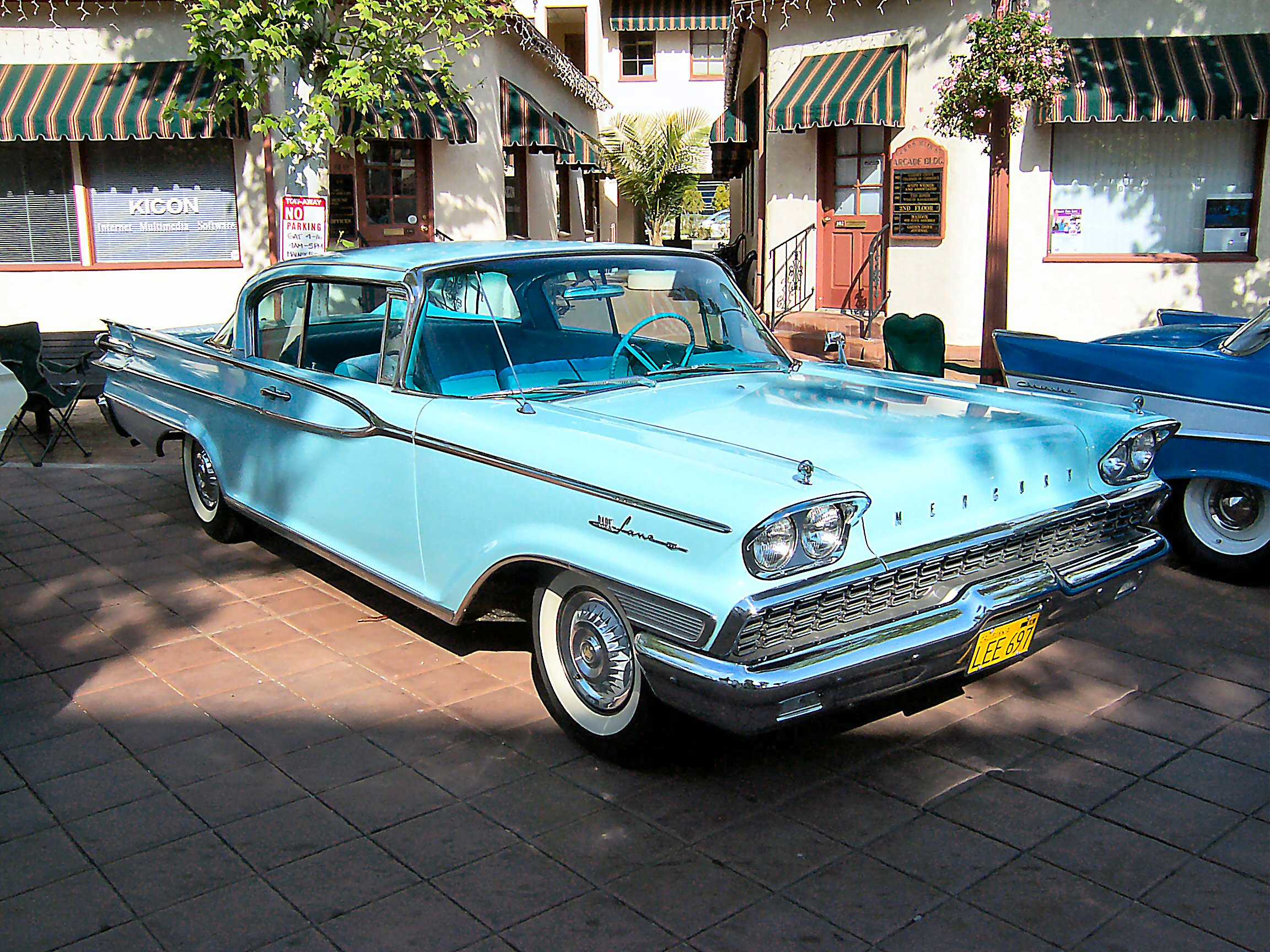
- 1959 Mercury Park Lane two-door hardtop cruiser

Overview
- Model years: 1958–1960
- Assembly: Main plant Wayne, Michigan (Branch assembly); Metuchen, New Jersey; Pico Rivera, California; Hazelwood, Missouri

Body and chassis
- Body style: 2-door hardtop coupe 2-door convertible 4-door hardtop sedan
- Layout: FR layout
- Related: Mercury Colony Park; Edsel Citation

Powertrain
- Engine: 430 cu in (7.0 L) Ford MEL V8
- Transmission: 3-speed Merc-O-Matic

Dimensions
- Wheelbase: 125.0 in (3,175 mm); 126.0 in (3,200 mm); 128.0 in (3,251 mm)
- Length: 220.2 in (5,593 mm)
- Width: 81.1 in (2,060 mm)
- Curb weight: 4,560 lb (2,070 kg)

Chronology
- Predecessor: Mercury Turnpike Cruiser
- Successor: Mercury S-55

The Mercury Park Lane was introduced for the 1958 model year as a premium model line for the division. In design, it was conceptualized as a Super Mercury that would compete with General Motors' Buick Limited and Chrysler 300D. Available in two-door and four-door hardtops and convertible coupes, the Park Lane offered the same body styles as the Turnpike Cruiser which it replaced, though its distinctive "breezeway" rear window was adopted by the Continental Mark line. The Park Lane was offered as the flagship Mercury model line with a similar approach to luxury shared with the updated four passenger Ford Thunderbird with a listed retail price of US$3,867 for the coupe ($43,153 in 2025 dollars) and US$4,118 for the convertible ($45,953 in 2025 dollars). As before, the Park Lane was a body on frame chassis while the Thunderbird had unibody construction.

Sharing its chassis with the Colony Park station wagon (and Edsel Citation/Corsair), the Park Lane had a 125-inch wheelbase (3 inches longer than the standard Mercury chassis) and, for 1958 only, an extended rear deck 7 inches longer than standard models. In 1959, the Park Lane wheelbase was stretched to 128 inches (two inches longer than other Mercurys). For 1960, the Park Lane wheelbase was again changed, matching the 126 inches of the standard Mercury line.

The Park Lane was powered by a single engine: a 430 cubic-inch Ford MEL V8. Initially rated at 360 hp for 1958, the Super Marauder engine option package allowed any Mercury with the 430 to increase its output to 400 hp (the first mass-production engine in an American automobile to be so rated). For 1959, the Super Marauder was discontinued, with the standard engine rated at 345 hp, retuned to 310 hp in 1960. All Park Lanes were equipped with a three-speed Merc-O-Matic automatic transmission; the 1958 offered the "Multi-Matic" transmission controls and was changed to the steering column mounted gear selector starting in 1959.

For 1960, the Park Lane had a minor styling update distinguished by new taillamps, rear fender skirts, five chrome-accent bars ahead of the rear wheel openings, wide rocker panel moldings, and a padded dashboard.

In 1961, the Park Lane name was dropped (along with the Montclair) as the division reorganized its marketing efforts towards the better-selling Monterey alongside the introduction of the Mercury Comet compact.

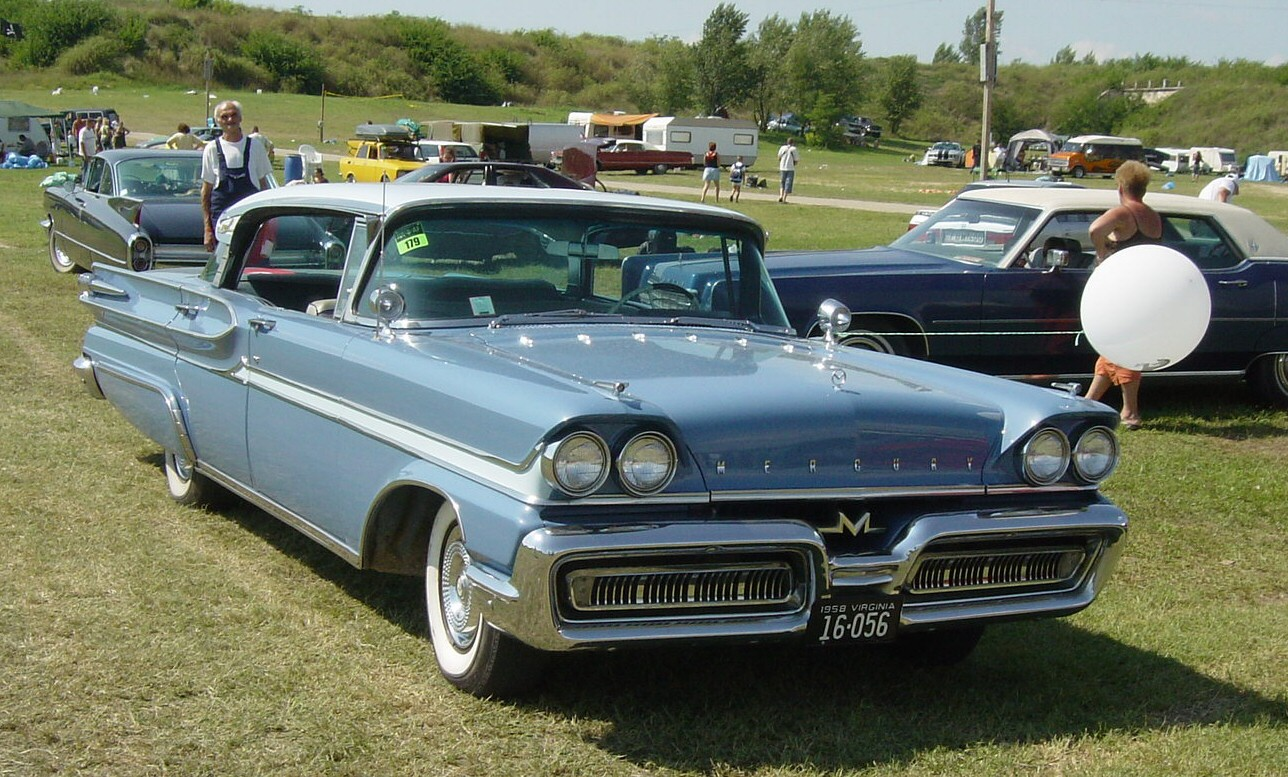
1958 Mercury Park Lane Phaeton Sedan

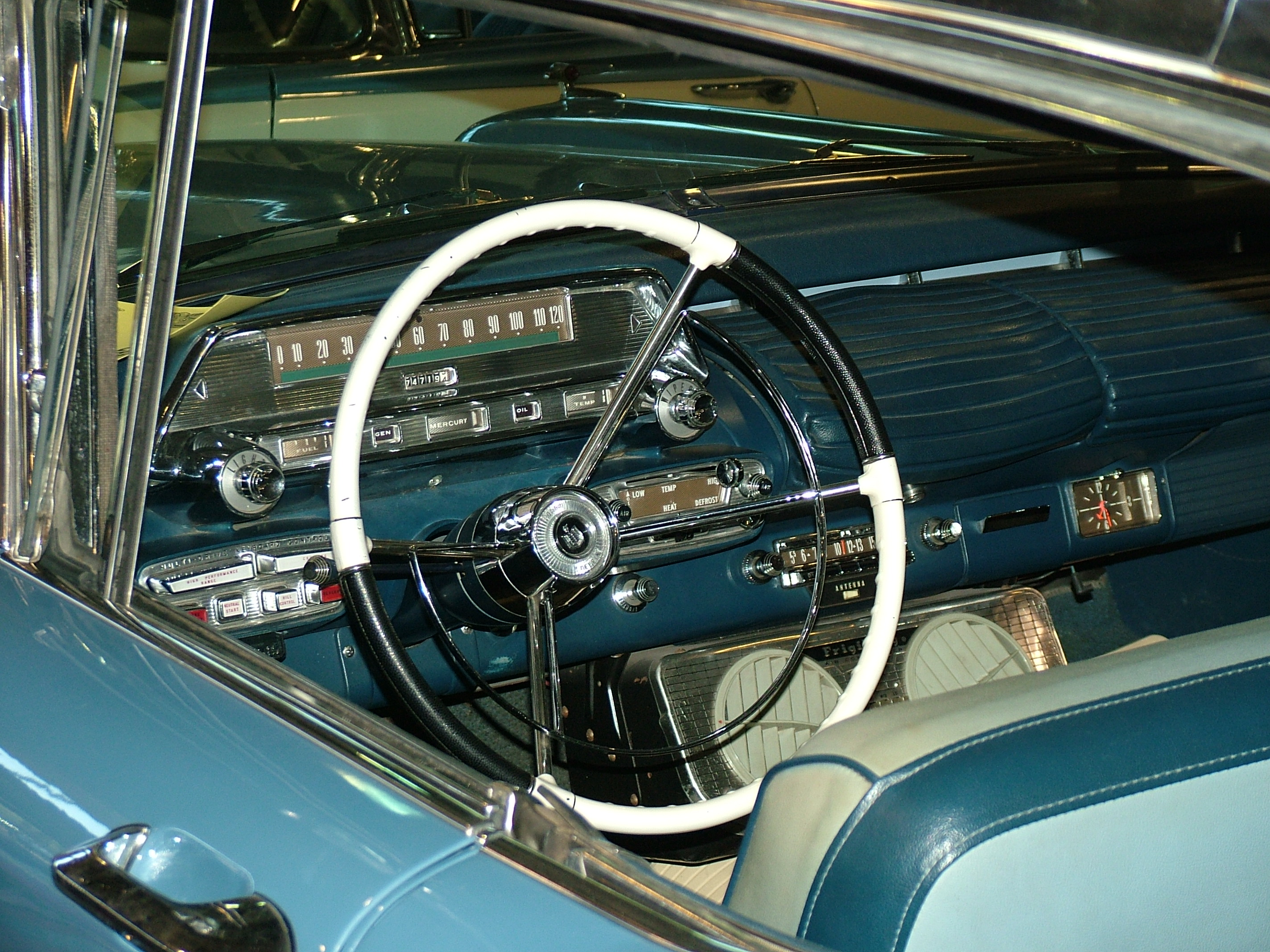
1958 Mercury Park Lane interior

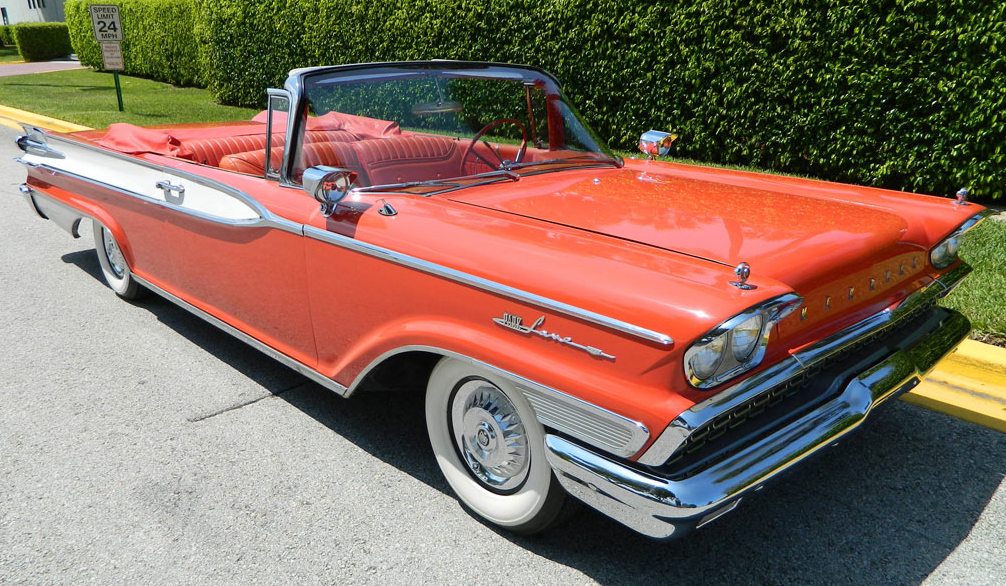
1959 Mercury Park Lane convertible

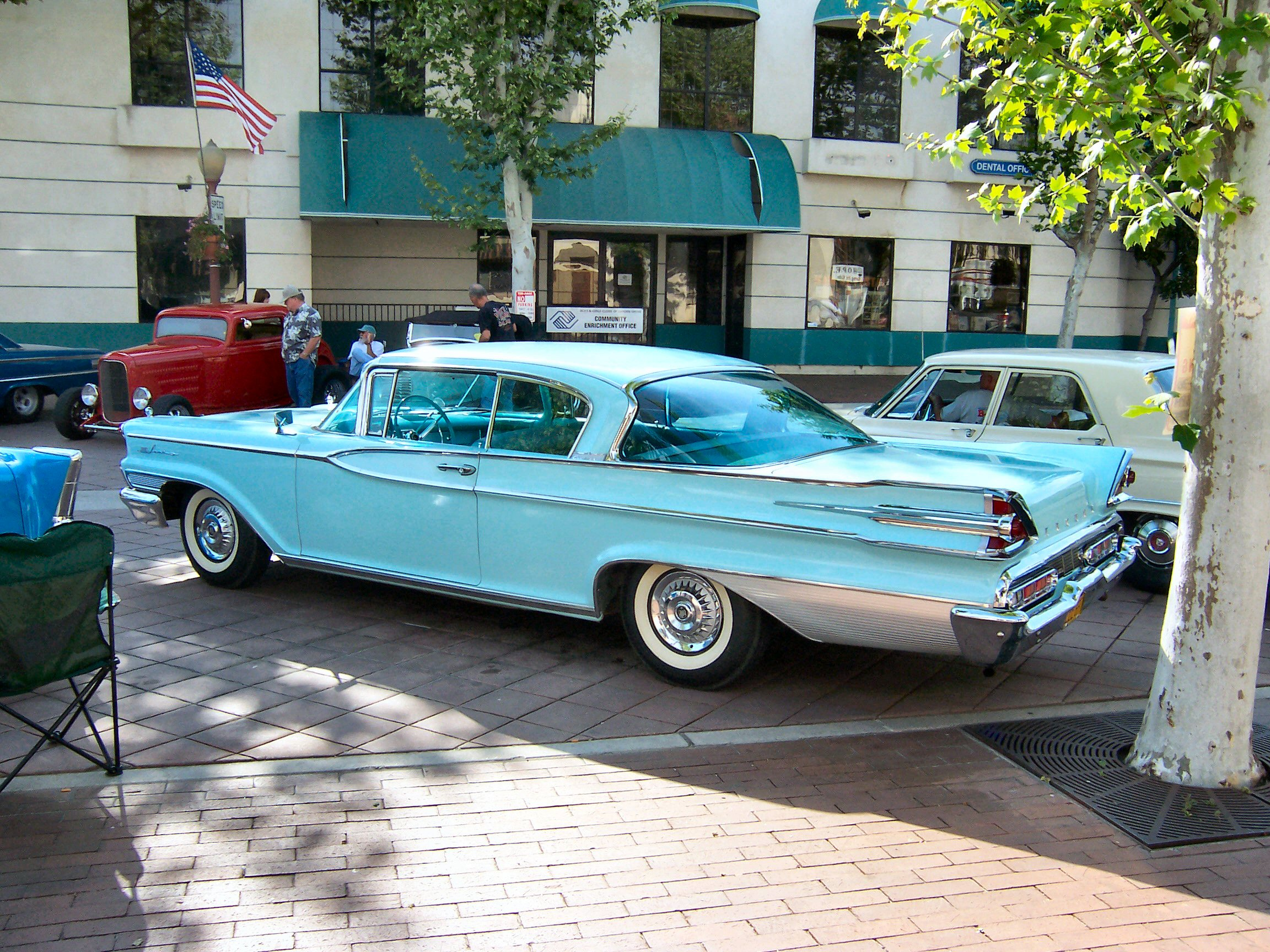
1959 Mercury Park Lane two-door hardtop cruiser

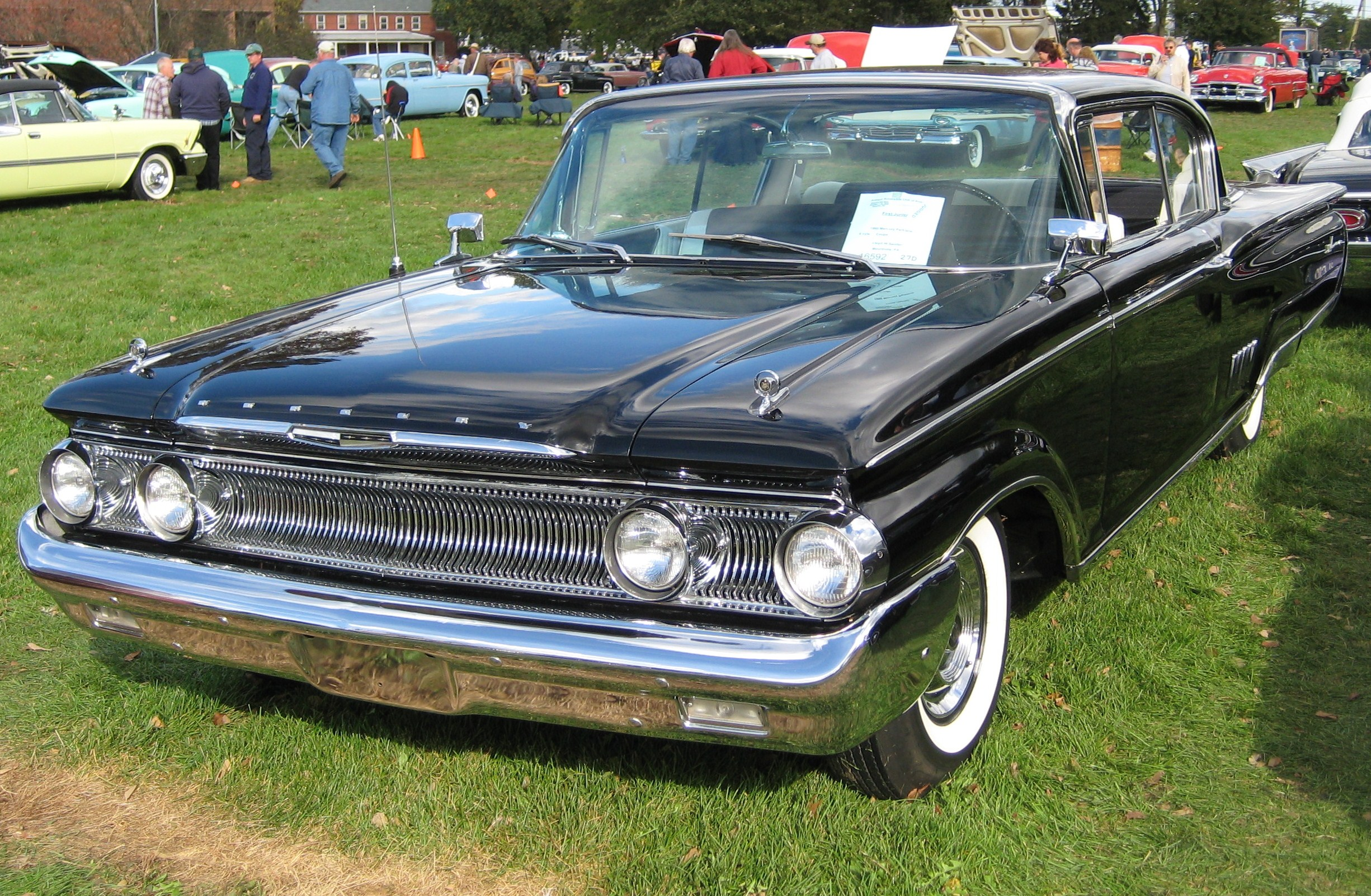
1960 Mercury Park Lane two-door hardtop cruiser

== Second generation (1964–1968) ==
Second generation
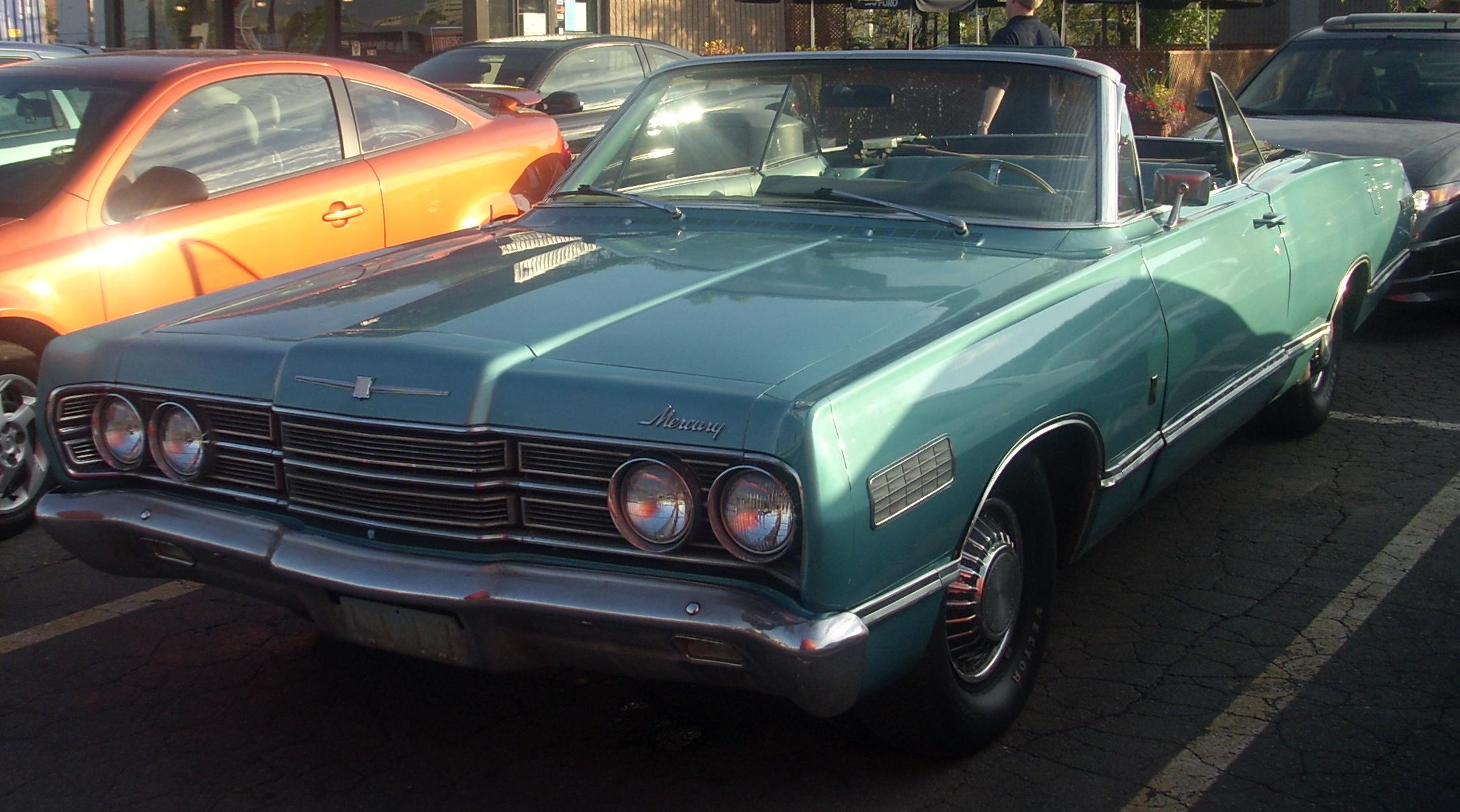
- 1967 Mercury Park Lane convertible

Overview
- Model years: 1964–1968
- Assembly: Hazelwood, Missouri (St. Louis Assembly Plant); Pico Rivera, California (Los Angeles Assembly); Hapeville, Georgia (Atlanta Assembly)

Body and chassis
- Body style: 4-door sedan 2-door Hardtop; 2-door convertible 4-door Hardtop
- Layout: FR layout
- Related: Ford LTD

Powertrain
- Engine: 410 cu in (6.7 L) Ford FE V8; 428 cu in (7.0 L) Ford FE V8

Dimensions
- Wheelbase: 120.0–123.0 in (3,048–3,124 mm)
- Length: 215.0–218.5 in (5,461–5,550 mm)
- Width: 81.1 in (2,060 mm)
- Curb weight: 4,171–4,211 lb (1,892–1,910 kg)

For the 1964 model year, the Mercury Park Lane made its return as the Mercury Division expanded its model line. Coinciding with Mercury's 25th Anniversary, the Park Lane again topped the Mercury line above the Monterey and newly reintroduced Montclair. In contrast to the previous generation, the Park Lane used the same wheelbase as other Mercury lines, differing primarily in trim. The listed retail price for the four-door hardtop or four-door hardtop fastback was US$3,413 ($35,430 in 2025 dollars) and a combined total of 6,060 were sold.

As the highest-priced, premium trim, many Park Lanes were fitted with the option of a "breezeway" retractable rear window that was first used on the Turnpike Cruiser and the 1958-1960 Continental. For 1964 the retractable rear window was installed in hardtop sedans with a reverse-slant configuration as in previous versions. In addition, Mercury offered the Park Lane with a fastback roofline as part of Marauder option package (seen on any full-sized Mercury); the fastback design proved popular on its Ford Galaxie 500 counterpart. The Mercury Colony Park station wagon was now aligned with the Park Lane model line.

For 1965, the chassis of full-sized Ford and Mercury cars was redesigned; the Mercury line was given a much more slab-sided appearance due to the popularity of the 1965 Lincoln Continental. The front grille continued to offer twin headlights in a recessed part of the grille. The retractable rear window was no longer available on the hardtop body and were now only available on the sedan body style across all Mercury vehicles.

For 1967, to complement the Mercury Marquis, which was only available as a two-door hardtop, the Park Lane Brougham was introduced as an exclusive trim package of the already luxurious Park Lane on the sedan only. For an option on the Park Lane hardtop coupe and convertible models, the sedan and convertible introduced "yacht deck paneling" body trim which was essentially the same simulated woodgrain DI-NOC used for the Colony Park station wagon; "yacht deck paneling" was a rarely ordered option.

As the division redesigned its full-sized line for 1969, the Marquis was expanded to a full model range, taking over the place of the Park Lane (the Brougham was largely replaced by the later Grand Marquis).

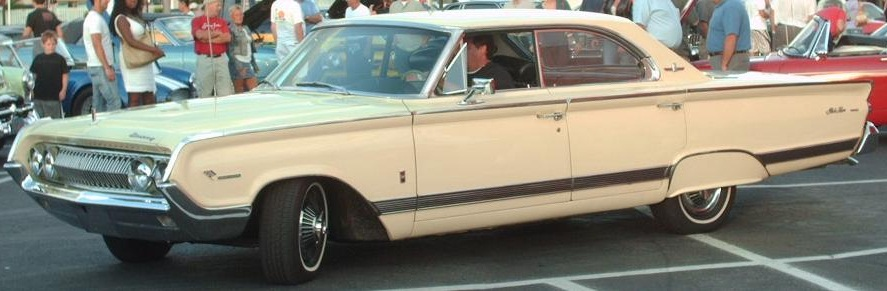
1964 Mercury Park Lane four-door hardtop ("Marauder" fastback roofline)

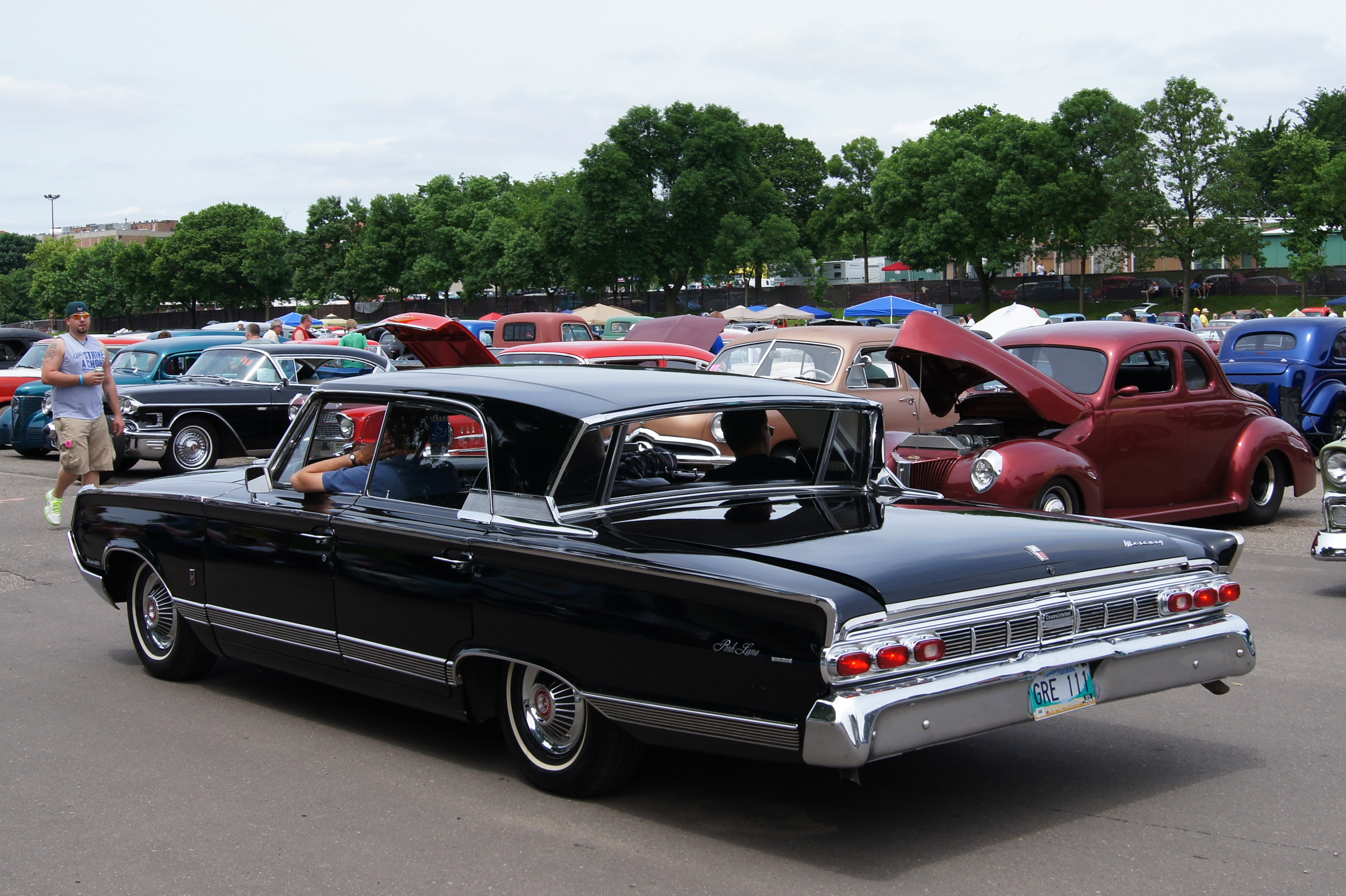
1964 Mercury Park Lane four-door hardtop ("Breezeway" roofline)

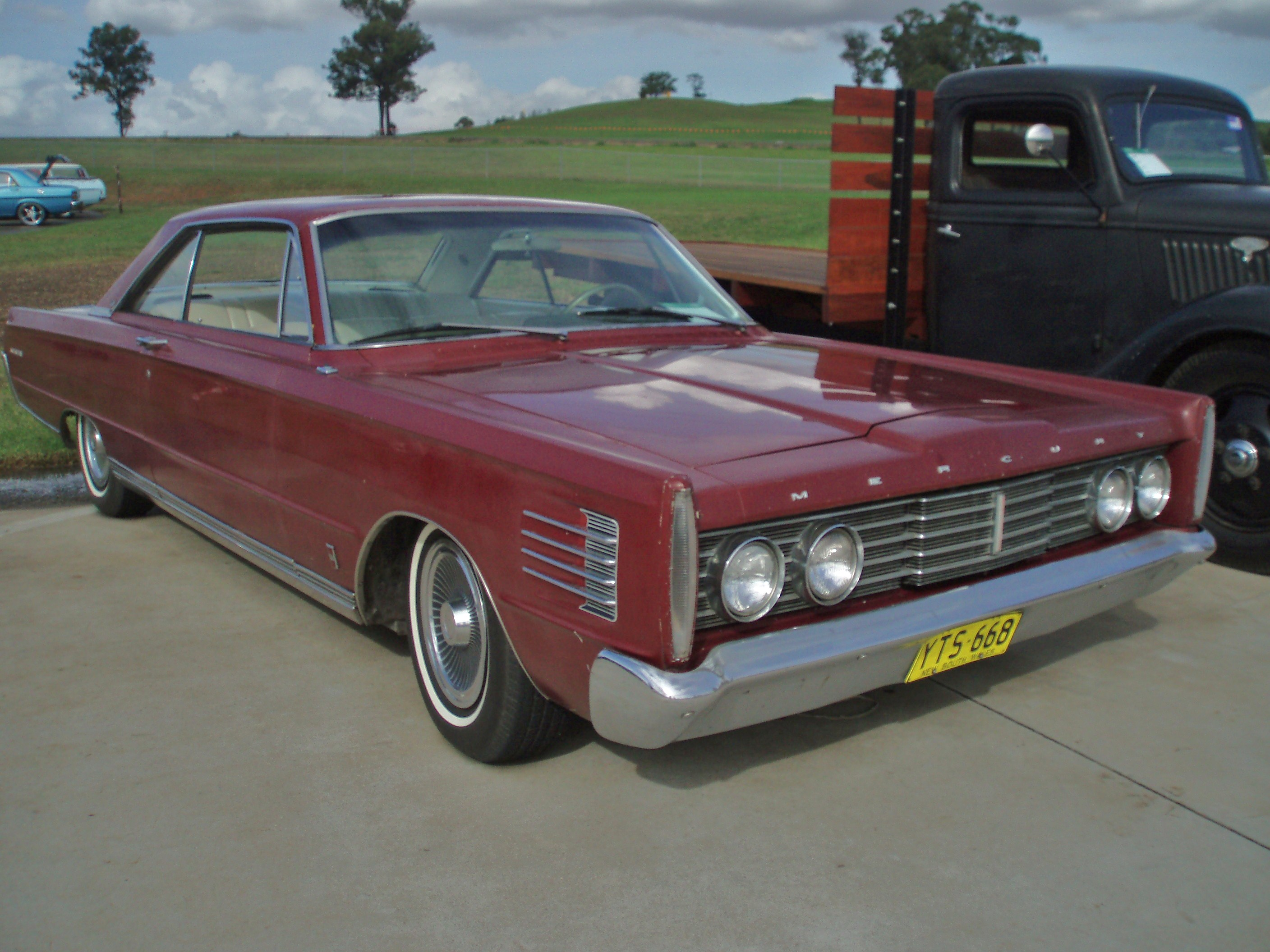
1965 Mercury Park Lane two-door hardtop

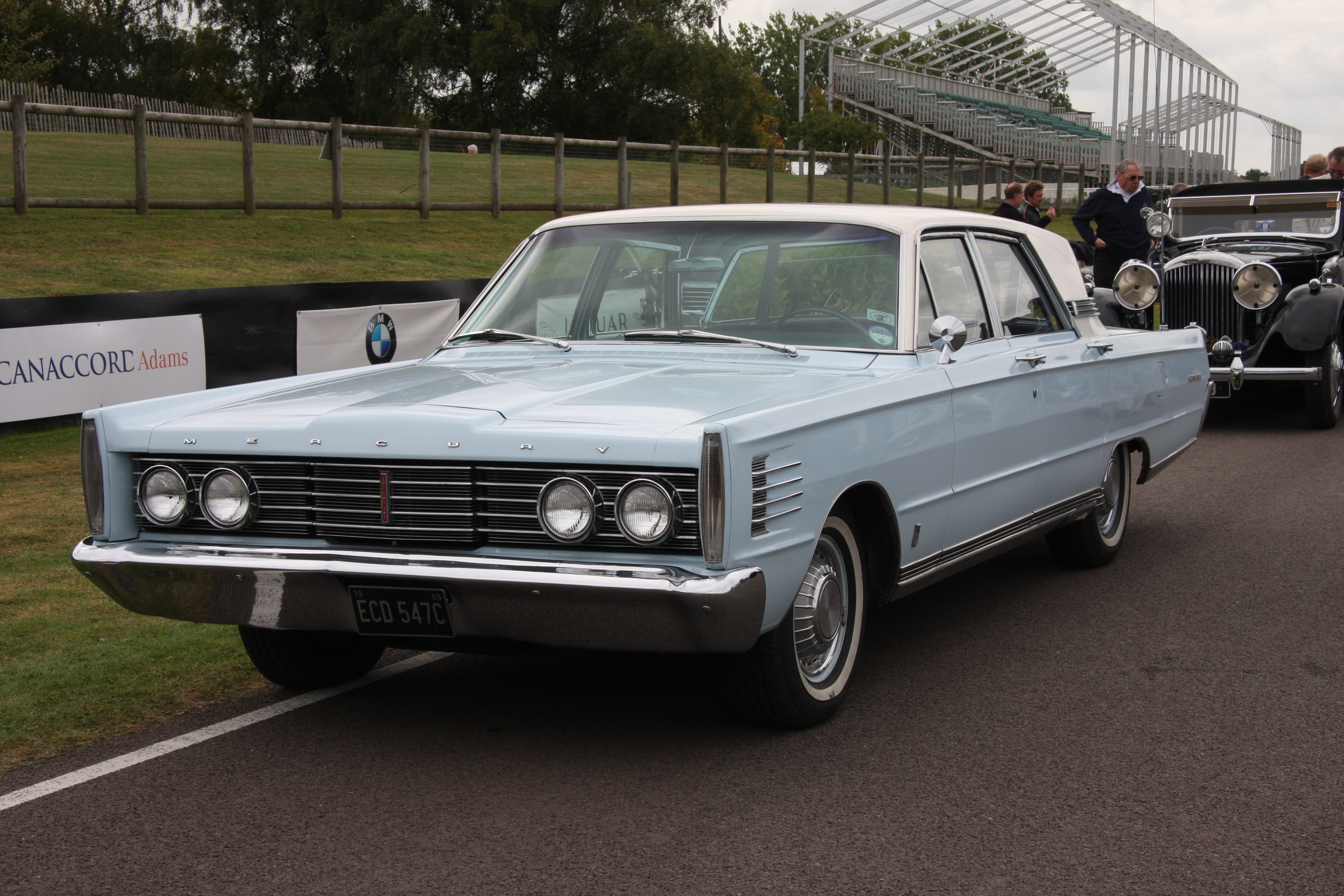
1965 Mercury Park Lane four-door sedan ("Breezeway" roofline)

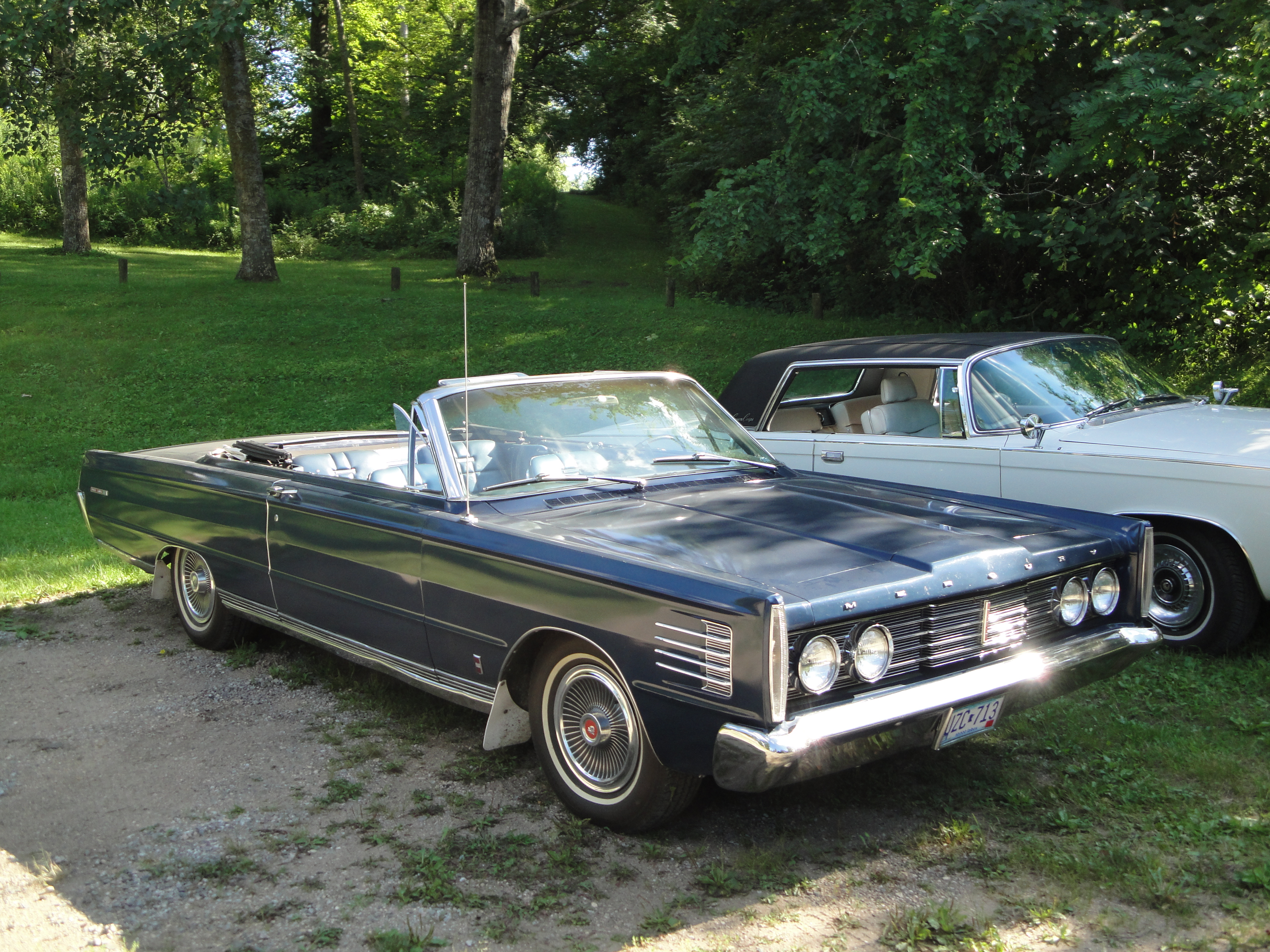
1965 Mercury Park Lane convertible

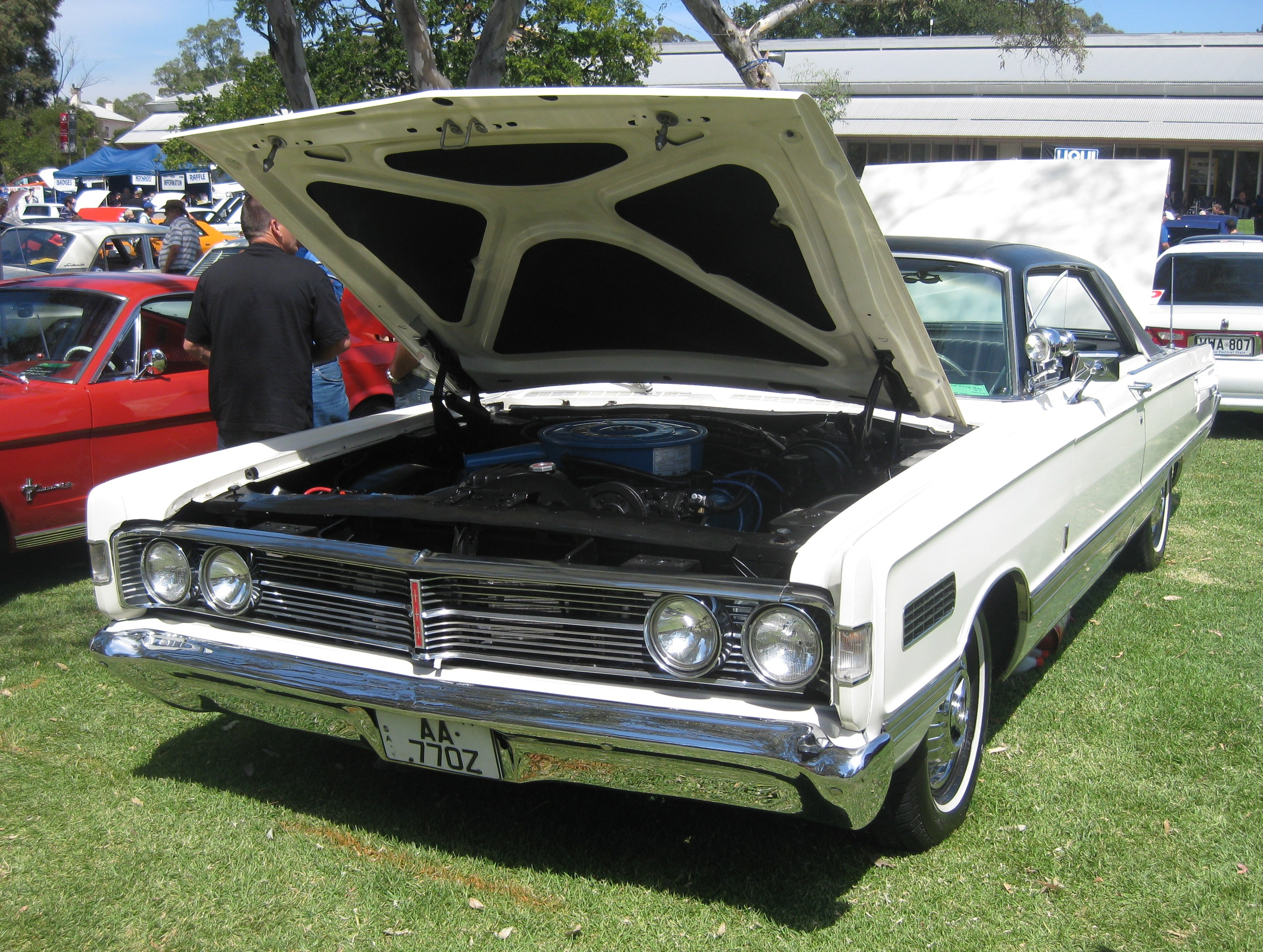
1966 Mercury Park Lane two-door hardtop

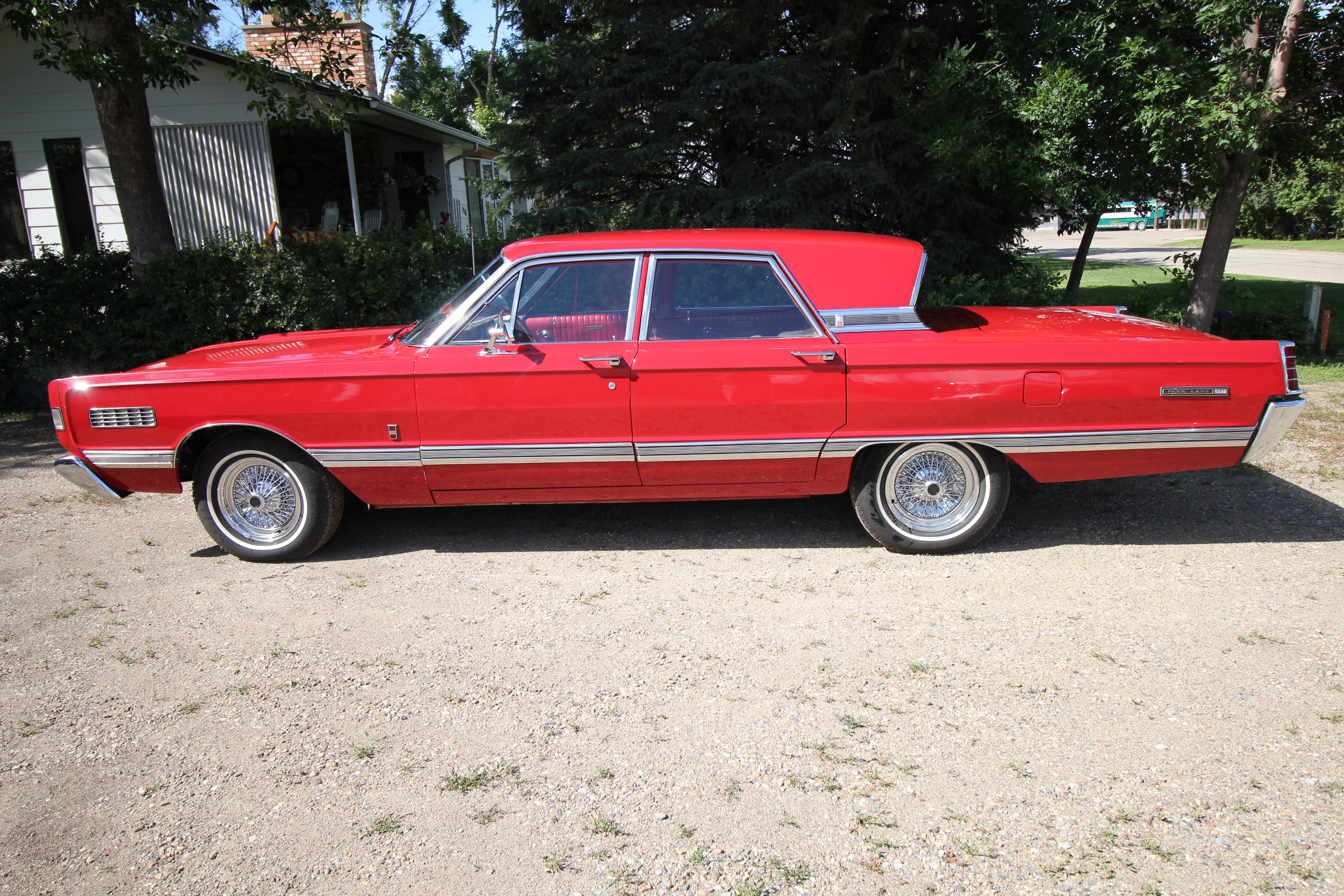
1966 Mercury Park Lane four-door sedan ("Breezeway" roofline)

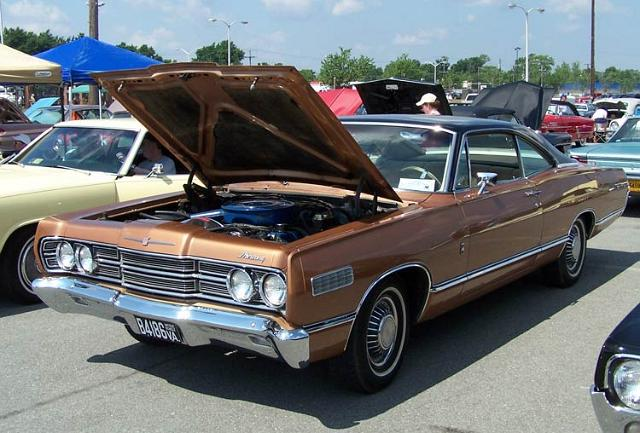
1967 Mercury Park Lane two-door hardtop

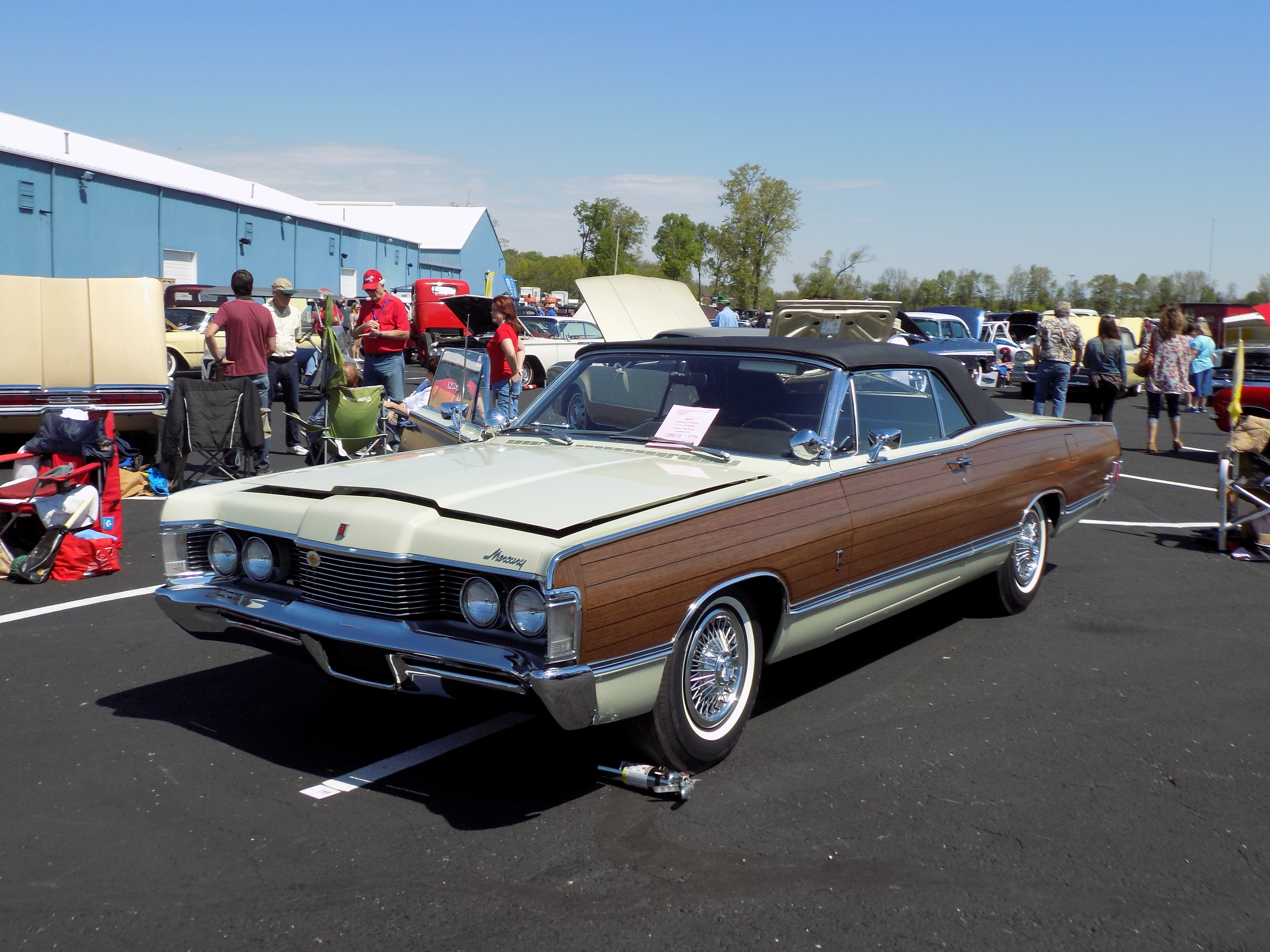
1968 Mercury Park Lane convertible with "yacht deck paneling" body trim

=== Mercury Park Lane Brougham ===
Park Lane Brougham
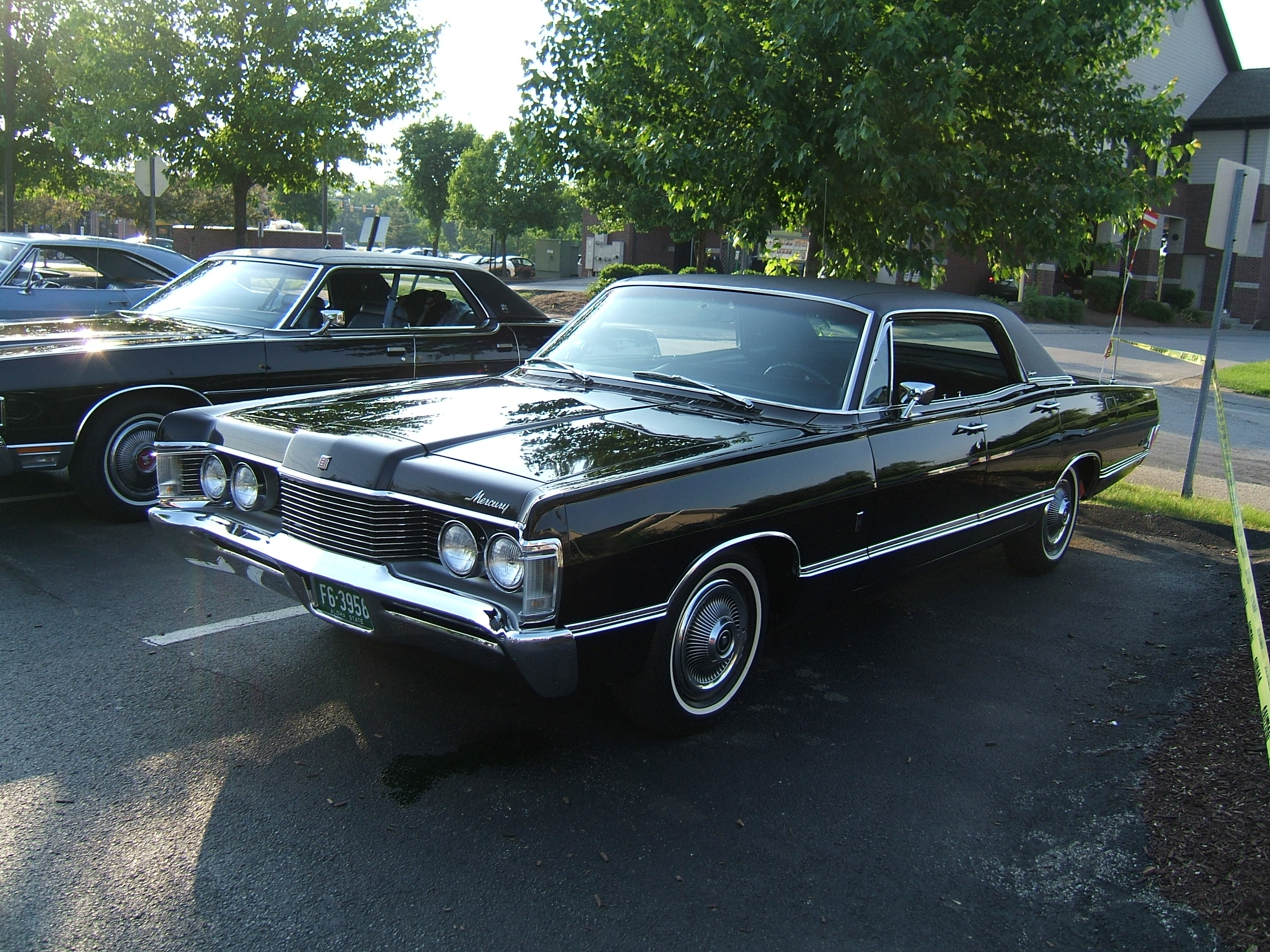

Overview
- Production: 1967

Body and chassis
- Body style: 4-door sedan 4-door hardtop

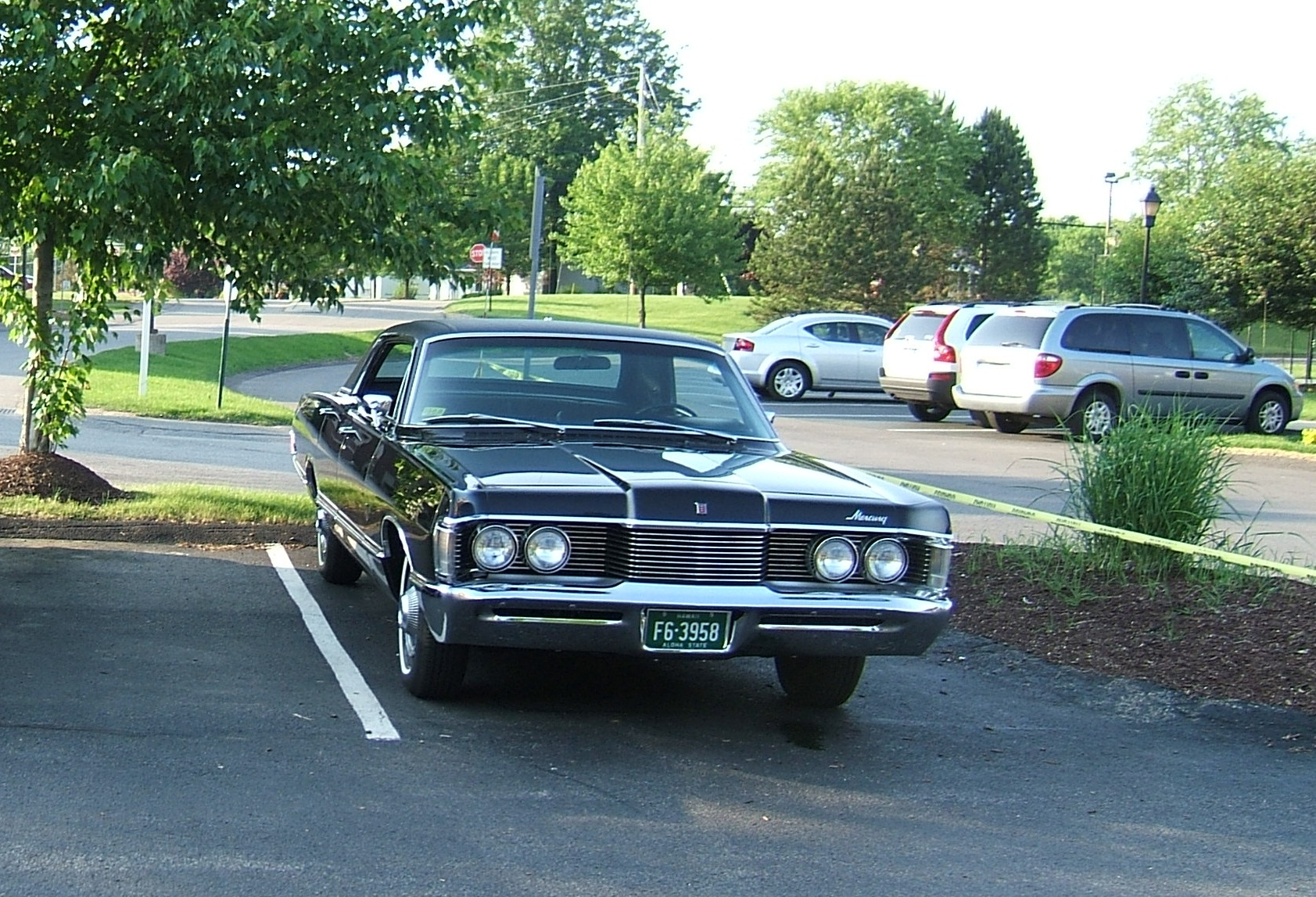
Triple-black 1968 Mercury Park Lane Brougham four-door hardtop

The Park Lane Brougham was the flagship Mercury model for 1967. Powerful and luxurious, it was offered as a four-door sedan, or four-door hardtop and was replaced by the Marquis as a two-door hardtop coupe only for 1968 followed by the sedan in later years. The Brougham differentiated itself from the standard Park Lane by featuring "Twin Comfort Lounge" 50–50 split bench seats with deep foam padding and a unique thick box-style cloth upholstery pleating, with matching upscale door panels with higher trim levels and pull straps, and unique ornamentation.

The term "brougham" was traditionally used for horse drawn carriages then luxury sedans which accommodated a driver in a separate compartment from the passenger, also related to a town car.

The Park Lane Brougham was the first Mercury to introduce a combination of front turn signals and parking lights that wrapped around the front edge of the fender that illuminated to the front and the side, expanding from an appearance introduced in 1966, and it was a feature that would be used by Ford products for several decades to follow.

The Mercury "Breezeway" retractable rear window was available but was installed in the four-door sedan only and not the four-door hardtop, a distinction shared with the entry-level Monterey and mid-level Montclair. The 1967 sedan was listed at US$3,986 ($38,488 in 2025 dollars) and 3,325 were made while the hardtop was US$3,896 ($37,619 in 2025 dollars) and 4,189 were manufactured. In comparison to the 1967 Lincoln Continental it was listed at US$5,795 ($55,955 in 2025 dollars) and 32,331 found buyers.
