= California Senate Bill 1827 (2006) =

California Senate Bill 1827, the State Income Tax Equity Act, established the requirement that couples registered as California domestic partners file their state income taxes as married couples. It was signed into law on September 29, 2006, by Governor Arnold Schwarzenegger. The bill took effect on January 1, 2007, and only applies to tax years 2007 onward (therefore most taxpayers first filed returns under this law in April 2008).

Registered domestic partners must still, however, file their federal tax returns as single individuals. California income tax returns rely on the federal adjusted gross income (AGI) from federal tax returns, so registered domestic partners must use an alternative method for calculating their AGI. SB 1827 currently requires domestic partners to add their individual federal AGI together to come up with a total to enter into their joint California return. Because this method will result in 5% of domestic partners having a different AGI than they would if they were married, the California Franchise Tax Board had been considering proposals for alternative methods of calculation.

Final guidelines for domestic partners to calculate their federal AGI for the purposes of their California tax returns were issued by the Franchise Tax Board on December 18, 2007, and can be downloaded here (260k pdf).

Domestic partners should continue to monitor the Franchise Tax Board's SB 1827 site.
