= Tom Brougham =

American activist

- Born: March 20, 1943 (age 82)
- Known for: Claim to have coined term "domestic partnership"

Tom Brougham (born March 20, 1943) is a Berkeley, California gay rights activist who was the first to suggest a new legal category for recognizing couples other than marriage, and who coined the phrase domestic partnership.

Brougham is a former member of the Gay Liberation Front.

== Domestic partnerships ==
While serving as an employee of the City of Berkeley in the late 1970s, Bougham and his partner, vocalist/lyricist Barry Warren, came across the availability of employee benefits for families of city employees. However, because they were only available to married couples, this ruled out the availability to Warren due to the lack of legal recognition of their relationship. In October 1978, the city council passed an anti-discrimination ordinance inclusive of gays and lesbians, one which, like many of the time, did not address the relationship status of many gays and lesbians.

Taken aback, Brougham decided to propose a lower-tier type of legal partnership that would afford employees' benefits to same-sex couples, coining the term "domestic partnership" in an August 1979 letter to city administrators: "I am submitting my application to the City of Berkeley, as my employer, to enroll my domestic partner, Barry Warren, in the city's group health coverage". He and Warren took the proposal to the City of Berkeley and UC Berkeley, which was Warren's employer. Harry Britt, a member of the San Francisco Board of Supervisors who had been appointed to succeed Harvey Milk, was inspired by one of Brougham and Warren's presentations and took his version of the proposal to the Board in 1982. When vetoed by then-mayor Dianne Feinstein, activism for domestic partnership benefits increased.

In 1983, the City of Berkeley took up Brougham and Warren's idea by creating the Domestic Partner Task Force through the city's Human Rights and Welfare Commission; Leland Traiman served as the DPTF's chairperson, and Brougham contributed to the draft policy. The policy was adopted by the City Council and School Board in 1984, but the Council voted against the bill while the Board voted for it. It played a role in the electoral defeat of many members who had voted against the bill, and the solidly-pro-domestic partnership majority voted in favor of the bill in December, and Brougham and Warren were the first couple to file for employee domestic partnership benefits under the city's policy. Berkeley's policy, however, did not include a registry for residents of the city; it only granted live-in partner health benefits regardless of whether they were straight or gay.

Berkeley became the third city to enact a domestic partnership registry in the state in 1991. Brougham drafted the registry ordinance along with the Berkeley City Clerk Sherry Kelly and then president of the East Bay Lesbian/Gay Democratic Club Victoria Kolakowski.

== After domestic partnerships ==
Later, Brougham became the first openly gay elected official in the East Bay region of California on April 21, 1987, when he was elected as a director of the Peralta Community College District, and continued as a director until 2000.

Brougham is a former president of the East Bay Lesbian/Gay Democratic Club.

== See also ==
- Kevin and Don Norte
