= Sokolovsky (rural locality) =

Sokolovsky (Russian: Соколовский; masculine), Sokolovskaya (Соколовская; feminine), or Sokolovskoye (Соколовское; neuter) is the name of several rural localities in Russia:

- Sokolovsky, Bryansk Oblast, a settlement in Litizhsky Selsoviet of Komarichsky District of Bryansk Oblast
- Sokolovsky, Kostroma Oblast, a settlement in Zeblyakovskoye Settlement of Sharyinsky District of Kostroma Oblast
- Sokolovsky, Sverdlovsk Oblast, a settlement in Irbitsky District of Sverdlovsk Oblast
- Sokolovsky, Tula Oblast, a khutor in Shakhtersky Rural Okrug of Bogoroditsky District of Tula Oblast
- Sokolovsky, Volgograd Oblast, a khutor in Sokolovsky Selsoviet of Nekhayevsky District of Volgograd Oblast
- Sokolovsky, Bobrovsky District, Voronezh Oblast, a khutor in Nikolskoye Rural Settlement of Bobrovsky District of Voronezh Oblast
- Sokolovsky, Novokhopyorsky District, Voronezh Oblast, a settlement in Kolenovskoye Rural Settlement of Novokhopyorsky District of Voronezh Oblast
- Sokolovskoye, Republic of Bashkortostan, a village in Ilyino-Polyansky Selsoviet of Blagoveshchensky District of the Republic of Bashkortostan
- Sokolovskoye, Chelyabinsk Oblast, a selo in Sokolovsky Selsoviet of Uysky District of Chelyabinsk Oblast
- Sokolovskoye, Kostroma Oblast, a village under the administrative jurisdiction of Ponazyrevo Urban Settlement (urban-type settlement), Ponazyrevsky District, Kostroma Oblast
- Sokolovskoye, Krasnodar Krai, a selo in Sokolovsky Rural Okrug of Gulkevichsky District of Krasnodar Krai
- Sokolovskoye, Orenburg Oblast, a selo in Srednekargalsky Selsoviet of Sakmarsky District of Orenburg Oblast
- Sokolovskaya (rural locality), a village in Razinsky Selsoviet of Kharovsky District of Vologda Oblast
