= Sokolovsky =

Sokolovsky may refer to:

== People ==
- Sokolovsky (surname), including a list of people with the name

== Geography ==
- Sokolovsky District, name of Lazovsky District, Primorsky Krai, Russia, in 1941–1949
- Sokolovsky (rural locality) (Sokolovskaya, Sokolovskoye), name of several rural localities in Russia

== See also ==
- Sokol (disambiguation)
- Sokolov (disambiguation)
- Sokolovo (disambiguation)
- Sakalauskas
