= Breezeway (disambiguation) =

Breezeway may refer to:

- Breezeway, an architectural feature
- Breezeway (car), a type of automobile rear window
- Breezeway house
- Breezeway Records
