= Sokoband =

Jazz fusion duo

- Origin: Charlottesville, Virginia, USA
- Genres: Jazz fusion, jam band
- Years active: 1990–present
- Labels: Breezeway
- Members: Michael Sokolowski; Houston Ross
- Past members: John Gilmore (1990–1997)
- Website: sokoband.com

Sokoband, formerly known as Soko, is a jazz fusion duo, featuring pianist Michael Sokolowski and bassist Houston Ross. The group formed as a trio in Charlottesville, Virginia in 1991, with Sokolowski, Ross, and drummer John Gilmore. The group performed live for several years, then released their first studio album, In November Sunlight, in 1996. The album received notably high record sales for an instrumental album, mainly due to its guest appearance by members of the Dave Matthews Band—Dave Matthews, LeRoi Moore, and Tim Reynolds.

In 1997, Gilmore left the group, however Sokolowski and Ross remained close and continued performing together. The duo began working on their second album, Two, in 2000, which featured writing, arranging, and singing contributions by Ross, whereas the previous album primarily contributions strictly from Sokolowski. The album took almost five years to complete, and was not released until 2005, however the album featured many more guest performers than the previous album, including former band member John Gilmore.

Due to confusion with other bands of the same name, Soko was renamed to "Sokoband" in 2010.

On March 9, 2010, Sokoband released a self-titled album, Sokoband, which contains all eight tracks from In November Sunlight, as well as two additional tracks, entitled "And Yet Your Smile" and "Nightfall." The band was not happy with the musical execution or production of the 1996 release, and wanted to present more definitive realizations of the compositions. Drummer on the project is Nir Z. Dave Matthews, Tim Reynolds, and LeRoi Moore appear again, along with Steve Kimock (guitars), Mike Colley (guitars), David Cast (saxophones), John Zias (guitars), David Darling (cello), and others.

== Discography ==
- In November Sunlight (1996)
- Two (2000)
- Sokoband (2010)
