= Sokołowski =

Sokołowski (feminine Sokołowska) is a Polish toponymic surname for someone from any of places named Sokołów or Sokołowo, from Polish sokół (falcon). Notable people with the surname include:

- Alfred Sokołowski (1849–1924), Polish doctor
- Andrzej Sokołowski (born 1948), Polish handball player
- Anita Sokołowska (born 1976), Polish actress
- Beata Sokołowska-Kulesza (born 1974), Polish sprint canoer
- Ben Sokolowski, Canadian television writer
- Diana Sokołowska (born 1996), Polish swimmer
- George Sokolowski (1917–1984), American politician
- Heinz Sokolowski (1917–1965), German victim of the Berlin wall
- Howard Sokolowski, Canadian businessman and philanthropist
- Jan Sokolowski (1899–1982), Polish ornithologist
- John Sokolowski (born 1975), Canadian bobsledder
- Kazimierz Sokołowski (1908–1998), Polish ice hockey player
- Linda Frum Sokolowski (born 1963), Canadian author and politician
- Marek Sokołowski (born 1978), Polish footballer
- Marla Sokolowski, Canadian geneticist
- Michael Sokolowski (born 1962), Canadian sprinter
- Michał Sokołowski (born 1992), Polish basketball player
- Olena Ustymenko Sokolowski (born 1986), American volleyball player
- Patryk Sokołowski (born 1994), Polish footballer
- Robert Sokolowski (born 1934), American philosopher
- Stefan Lech Sokołowski (1904–1940), Polish mathematician, climber and soldier
- Tomasz Sokolowski (disambiguation), several football players
- Włodzimierz Sokołowski (1940–2012), Polish athlete
