= Sakalauskas =

- Lithuanian surname
- m.: Sakalauskas
- f.: (unmarried): Sakalauskaitė
- f.: (married): Sakalauskienė
- f.: (short): Sakalauskė
- Origin: see "Sokołowski"
- Related names: Polish: Sokołowski; Russian: Sokolovsky; Belarusian: Sakałoŭski

Sakalauskas, Sakalauskienė, Sakalauskaitė is a Lithuanian family name, the Lithuanization of the Polish-language surname Sokołowski. Notable people with the surname include:

- Arūnas Sakalauskas (1952), Lithuanian painter and sculptor
- Arūnas Sakalauskas (1962), Lithuanian actor
- Jonas Sakalauskas, director of the Lithuanian National Opera and Ballet Theatre
- Rimantas Sakalauskas (born 1951), sculptor
- Rytis Sakalauskas (born 1987), sprinter
- Šarūnas Sakalauskas (born 1960), basketball coach
- Stasys Sakalauskas (1946–2004), Lithuanian diplomat
- Vaidas Sakalauskas (born 1971), chess master
- Vytautas Sakalauskas (1933–2001), former prime minister of Lithuania
