= Mercury Turnpike Cruiser =

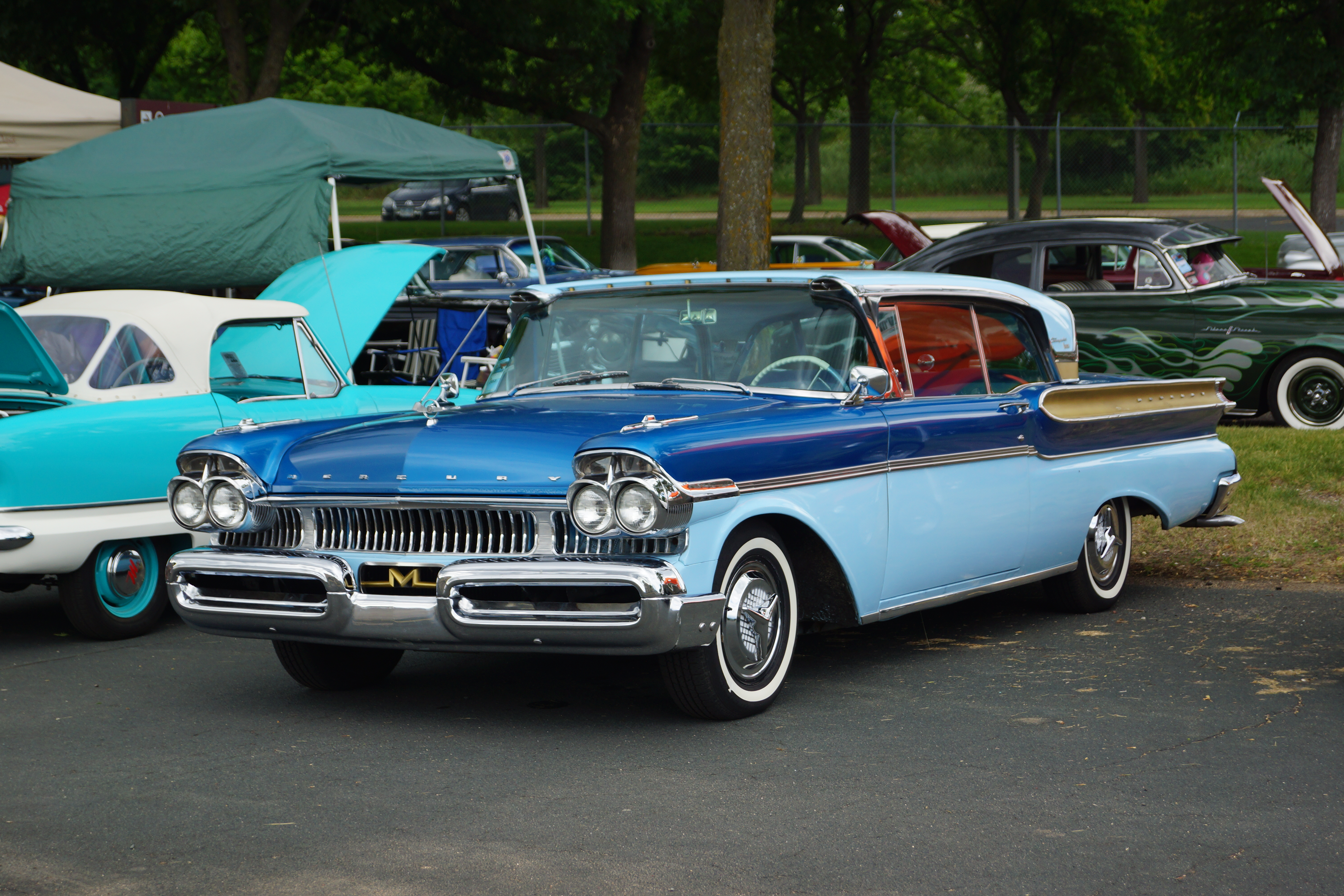
- 1957 Mercury Turnpike Cruiser

Overview
- Manufacturer: Mercury (Ford)
- Also called: Mercury Convertible Cruiser
- Model years: 1957–1958
- Assembly: Main plant Wayne, Michigan (Branch assembly); St. Louis, Missouri; Pico Rivera, California; Metuchen, New Jersey

Body and chassis
- Class: Full-size car
- Body style: 2-door hardtop 4-door hardtop sedan 2-door convertible
- Layout: FR layout
- Chassis: body-on-frame
- Related: Mercury Montclair; Mercury Monterey; Mercury Colony Park

Powertrain
- Engine: 368 cu in (6.0 L) Y-Block V8; 383 cu in (6.3 L) Marauder V8; 430 cu in (7.0 L) Marauder V8; 430 cu in (7.0 L) Super Marauder V8
- Transmission: 3-speed Merc-O-Matic automatic

Dimensions
- Wheelbase: 122 in (3,099 mm)
- Length: 211 in (5,359 mm)
- Width: 79.1 in (2,009 mm)
- Height: 56.5 in (1,435 mm)
- Curb weight: 4,015 lb (1,821 kg)

Chronology
- Successor: Mercury Park Lane

The Mercury Turnpike Cruiser is a series of automobiles that were produced by the Mercury division of Ford for the 1957 and 1958 model years. Named to commemorate the creation of the Interstate Highway System, the Turnpike Cruiser was marketed as the flagship Mercury model line, slotted above the Montclair when Mercury was positioned upmarket to luxury status when Edsel was introduced in 1958.

The Turnpike Cruiser was produced as a luxury two-door and a four-door hardtop sedan. During the 1957 model year, a convertible, called the Convertible Cruiser, was offered on a limited basis, which served as a pace car for the Indianapolis 500 auto race. Mercury fitted the Turnpike Cruiser with a wide variety of advanced features for the time of its production, including a retractable rear window marketed as the "Breezeway", compound-curve windshield, mechanical pushbutton transmission controls and a trip computer.

In total, 23,268 examples of the Turnpike Cruiser were produced over two years. Mercury discontinued the Turnpike Cruiser for the 1958 model year, phasing its content into the Park Lane product line.

== Model overview ==
The Turnpike Cruiser derives its name from the 1956 Mercury XM-Turnpike Cruiser concept car, a two-door hardtop which largely served as a preview of the 1957 Mercury model line. For 1957, the Turnpike Cruiser was offered as the top level Mercury model line, with a similar approach to luxury shared with the updated four passenger second generation Ford Thunderbird.

The list price was US$3,758 for the coupe, $43,079 in 2025 dollars, and US$4,103 for the convertible, $47,034 in 2025 dollars. Outside of Ford, the Turnpike Cruiser was marketed against the Buick Roadmaster and Oldsmobile 98. The Turnpike Cruiser had a body-on-frame chassis, while the Thunderbird had unibody construction. For 1958, the Turnpike Cruiser was phased into the Montclair line, and the premium top level role was given to the newly introduced Park Lane.

=== Chassis ===
The Turnpike Cruiser shared its 122-inch wheelbase, rear-wheel drive, body-on frame chassis with the Monterey and Montclair. Front suspension was independent ball-joint with coil springs, the rear a live axle with leaf springs. Brakes were 11-inch drummed all round.

Edsel adopted a 124-inch wheelbase version of the chassis was for its 1958 model year Corsair and Citation premium model lines.

==== Powertrain ====
For 1957, the Turnpike Cruiser was fitted with a 368 cubic-inch, 290 hp V8. Sharing its name with the car, the engine was offered as an option across the rest of the Mercury line. For 1958, two all-new "Marauder" engines were introduced: a 383 cubic-inch, 330 hp V8 was standard (and shared with the Montclair and Colony Park); and a 430 cubic-inch, 360 hp (shared with the Park Lane). An optional triple-two barrel carburetor "Super Marauder" version of the 430 V8 produced 400 hp. Exclusive to Mercury, the Super Marauder was the first factory-produced engine with a 400 hp output, a response to the 375/390 hp 1957 Chrysler 300C.

All Turnpike Cruiser engines were paired with a 3-speed "Merc-O-Matic" automatic. For 1957, Mercury offered pushbutton transmission controls in response to the Chrysler TorqueFlite introduced in 1956. The Mercury control buttons initially offered five buttons and was called "Keyboard Control", with a long button on top labeled "Drive" and four smaller buttons below labeled "Brake", "Neutral Start", which allowed the engine to start with the ignition key, "Hill Control", and "Reverse". Later versions, relabeled as "Multi-Drive" for 1958, separated the "Drive" button to "Performance" and "Cruising". A separate push/pull lever was included below the control buttons labeled "Park" which would lock out the control buttons until the Park button was pulled to release it. The control panel was installed to the left of the steering wheel. In 1959, the keyboard control was discontinued and replaced with a standard steering column gear selector lever.

1957-1958 Mercury Turnpike Cruiser powertrain details
Engine name	Production	Configuration	Fuel system	Output		Transmission
Engine name	Production	Configuration	Fuel system	Horsepower	Torque	Transmission
Turnpike Cruiser V8 (Lincoln Y-block)	1957	368 cu in (6.0 L) V8	4-barrel carburetor	290 hp (220 kW) @ 4600 rpm	405 lb⋅ft (549 N⋅m) @ 2600 rpm	3-speed "Merc-O-Matic" automatic
Marauder V8 (Ford MEL)	1958	383 cu in (6.3 L) V8	4-barrel carburetor	330 hp (250 kW) @ 4800 rpm	425 lb⋅ft (576 N⋅m) @ 3000 rpm	3-speed "Merc-O-Matic" automatic
Marauder V8 (Ford MEL)	1958	430 cu in (7.0 L) V8	4-barrel carburetor	360 hp (270 kW) @ 4600 rpm	480 lb⋅ft (650 N⋅m) @ 3000 rpm	3-speed "Merc-O-Matic" automatic
Super Marauder V8 (Ford MEL)	1958	430 cu in (7.0 L) V8	3x2-barrel carburetor	400 hp (300 kW) @ 5200 rpm	480 lb⋅ft (650 N⋅m) @ 3200 rpm	3-speed "Merc-O-Matic" automatic

=== Body ===
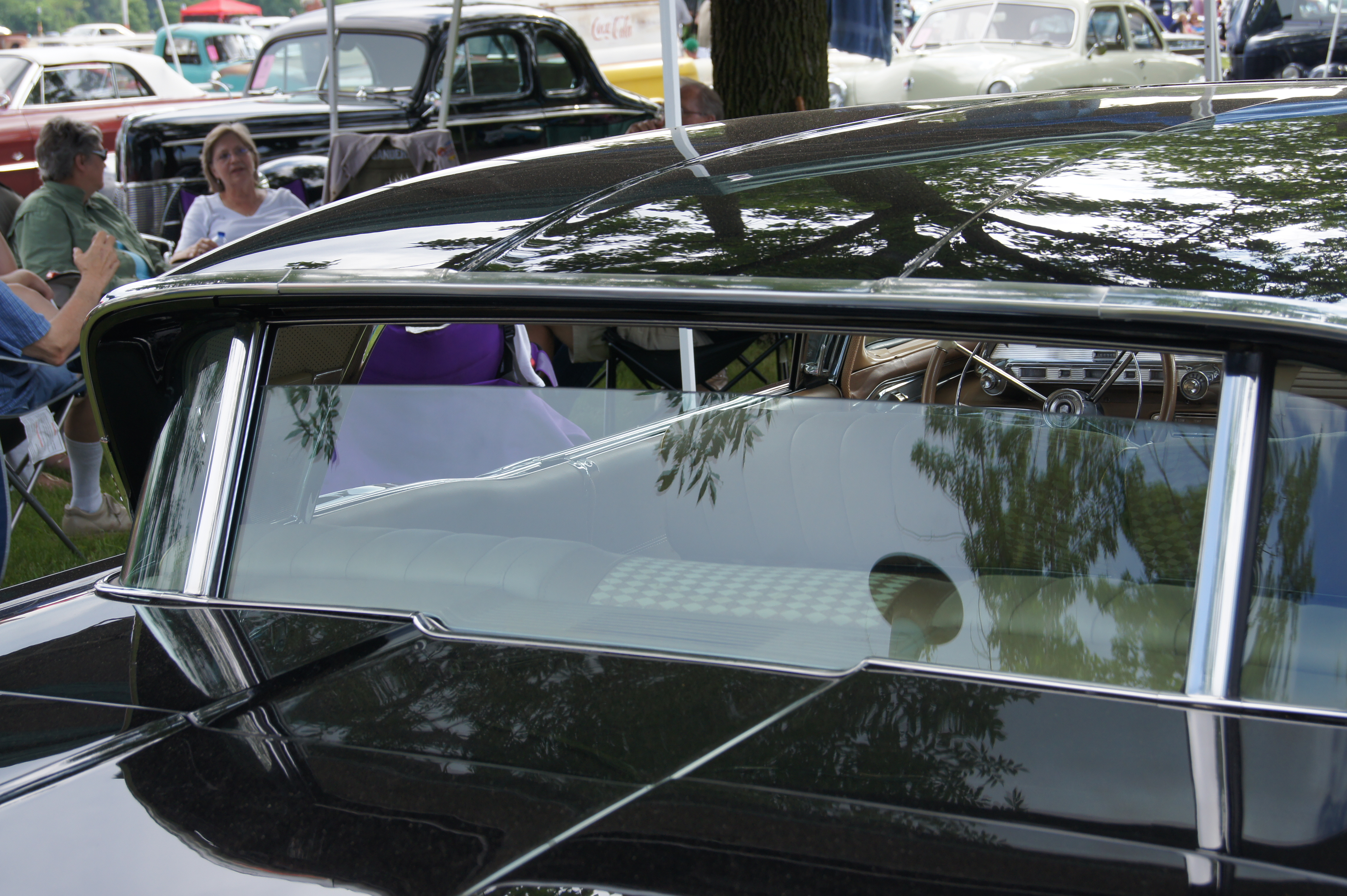
The "breezeway" rear window on a 1958 Montclair Turnpike Cruiser

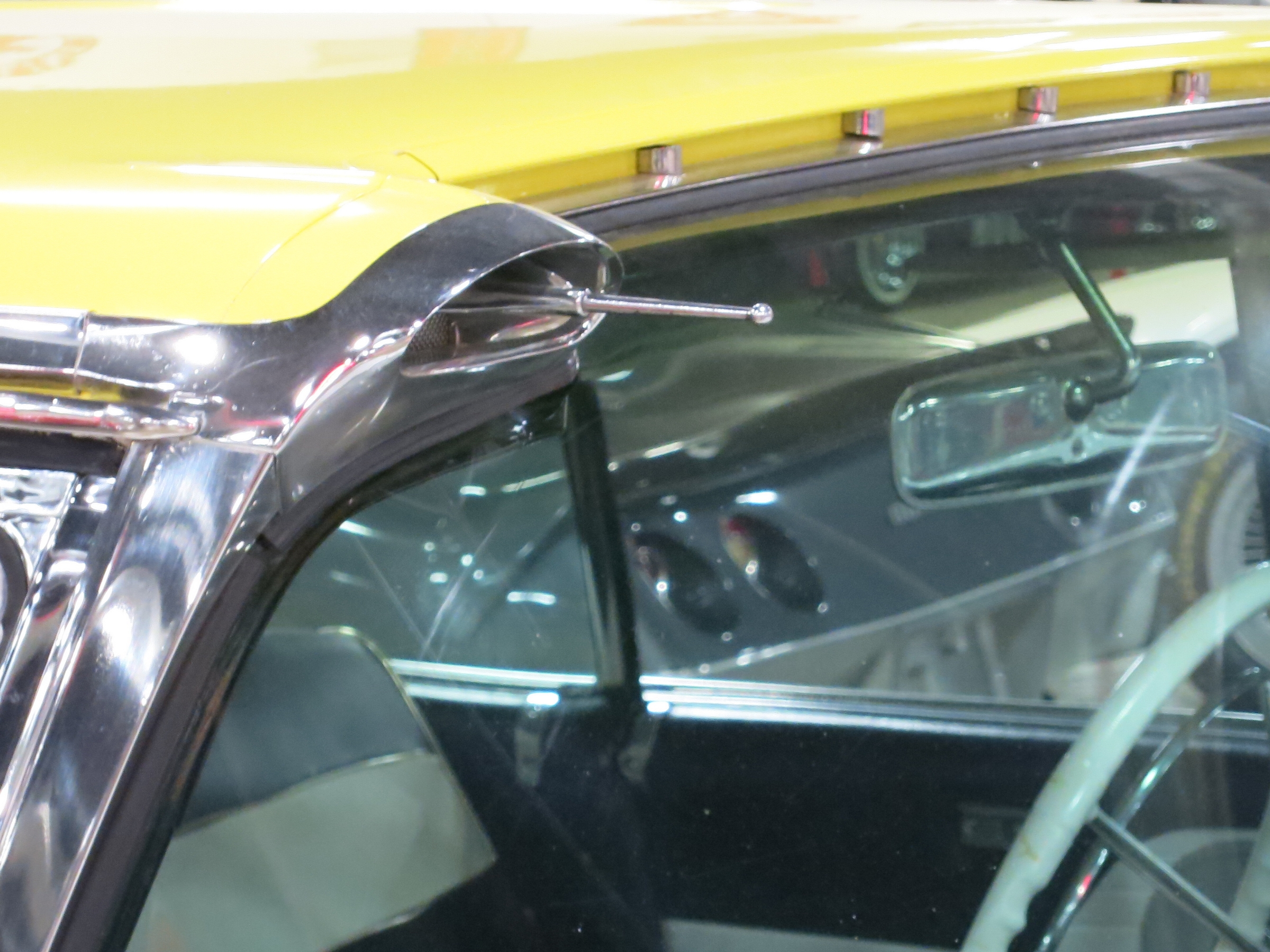
Rooftop air intake (incorporating a non-functional radio antenna) on a 1957 Turnpike Cruiser

During its production, the Turnpike Cruiser was offered as a two-door and four-door hardtop. To serve as the pace car for the 1957 Indianapolis 500, a convertible was created, named the Convertible Cruiser, leading Mercury to offer a replica version for sale. It was offered in a single yellow, Sun Glitter, exterior color and fitted with the optional continental tire kit.

An unusual 1957 feature was an ornament mounted outside at the base of the rear window, which was relocated inside next to the rear window and would light up if the exterior lights were on.

While sharing much of its body with the Montclair, the Turnpike Cruiser was distinguished by several exterior design features. Although not legalized across the entire United States until 1958, "Quadri-Beam" dual headlamps were fitted as standard equipment, the only 1957 Mercury to do so, as well as one of very few cars from that year to be equipped as such. For states that still mandated single headlights, a standard setup was used. In place of contrasting paint, the scalloped tailfins were gold-anodized. Along with its retractable "Breezeway" rear window, the Turnpike Cruiser received a separate roofline, with a windshield curving into the roof. The windshield was among the first to use tint to reduce solar glare.

As a consequence of the compound-curve design of the windshield, Mercury added rooftop ventilation intakes to the Turnpike Cruiser to cover a body seam, and unusually in a secondary function, each intake housed a fake radio antenna, as the functional radio antenna was mounted on the passenger side front fender. Air conditioning and power side windows were additional cost options. For 1958, the Turnpike Cruiser adapted the styling changes of the Montclair and Monterey, shifting the grilles into the front bumper. The rear fascia saw multiple changes, as the gold-anodized trim was removed from the scalloped fins. "Rocket-style" tail lamps were added. To distinguish the model line from the Montclair and Park Lane, the Turnpike Cruiser was given gold trim for its badging, including the Mercury "M" grille badge.

The interior of the Turnpike Cruiser had several features distinct from other Mercury sedans. To aid forward visibility, a flat-top deep-dish steering wheel was fitted, to match the curve of the instrument panel. Alongside a tachometer, "to measure engine efficiency", the instrument panel was fitted with a clock to calculate average speed and a trip odometer, effectively, a trip computer. One of the first memory seats, "Seat-O-Matic" was programmable and moved down and back when the ignition was off. While not equipped with cruise control, in 1958, the Turnpike Cruiser, alongside all Mercurys, was introduced with a programmable speed warning, setting off a warning if a preset speed was exceeded.

The Turnpike Cruiser standardized several Mercury safety features, including a padded dashboard, and dashboard gauges, a deep-dish flat-top steering wheel, and safety door locks. Seatbelts were optional, alongside a safety harness for children. Nearly 10 years before their introduction, the design of the taillamps performed as side marker lamps.

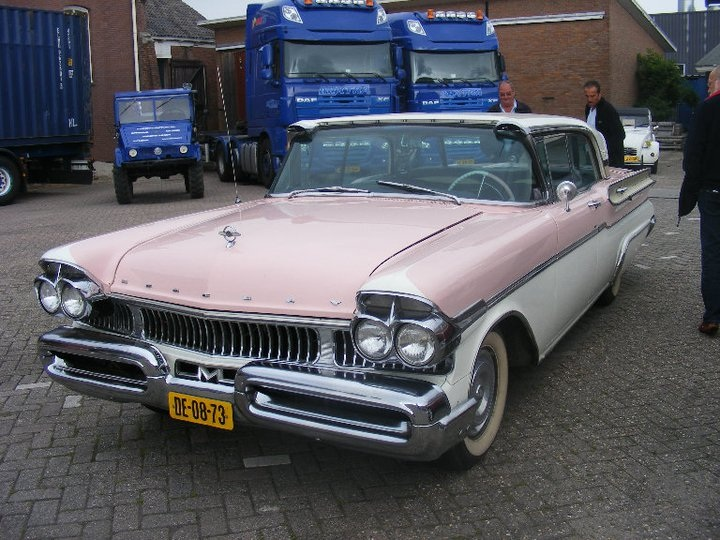
A 1957 Turnpike Cruiser 4-door hardtop

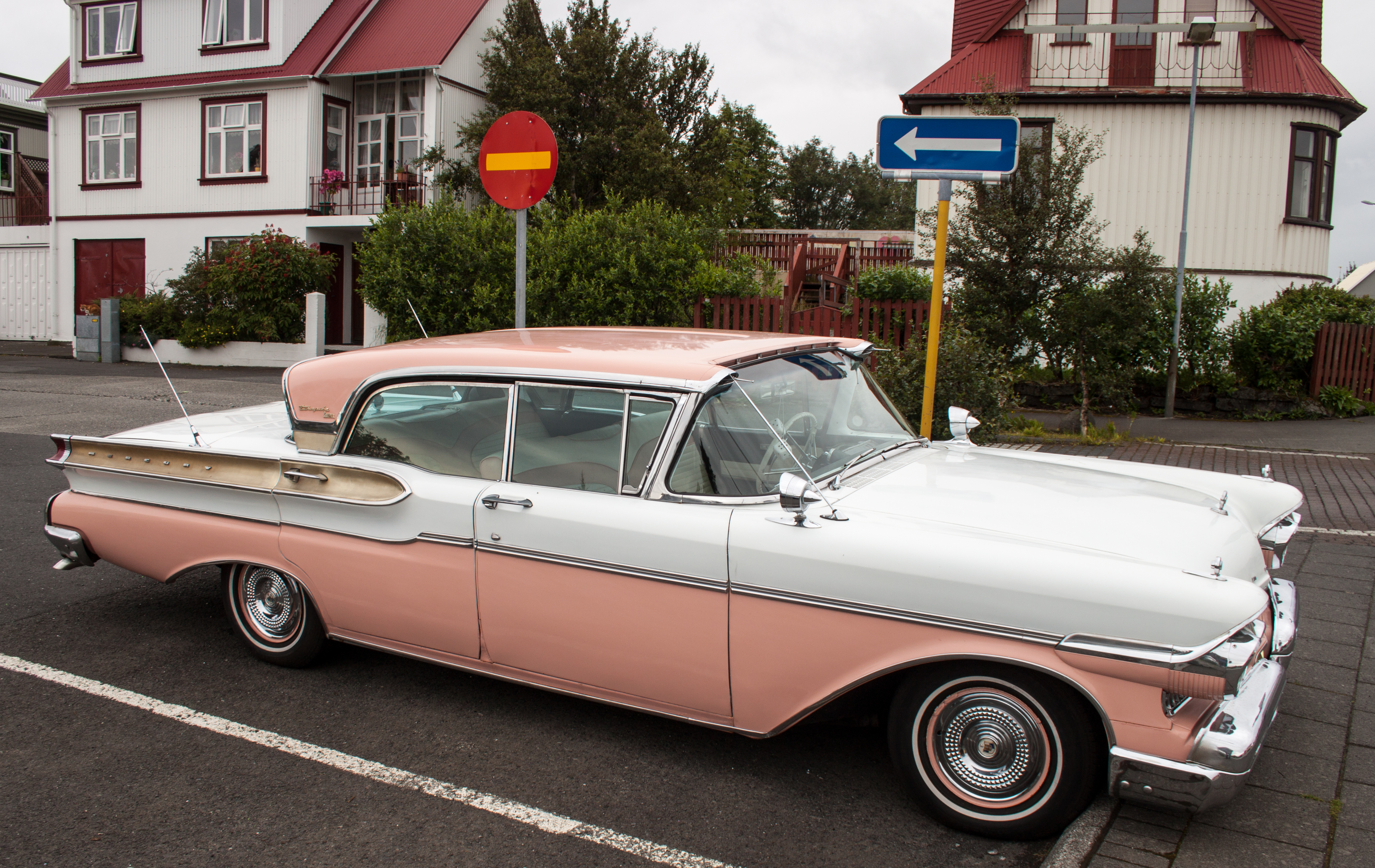
A 1957 Turnpike Cruiser 4-door hardtop

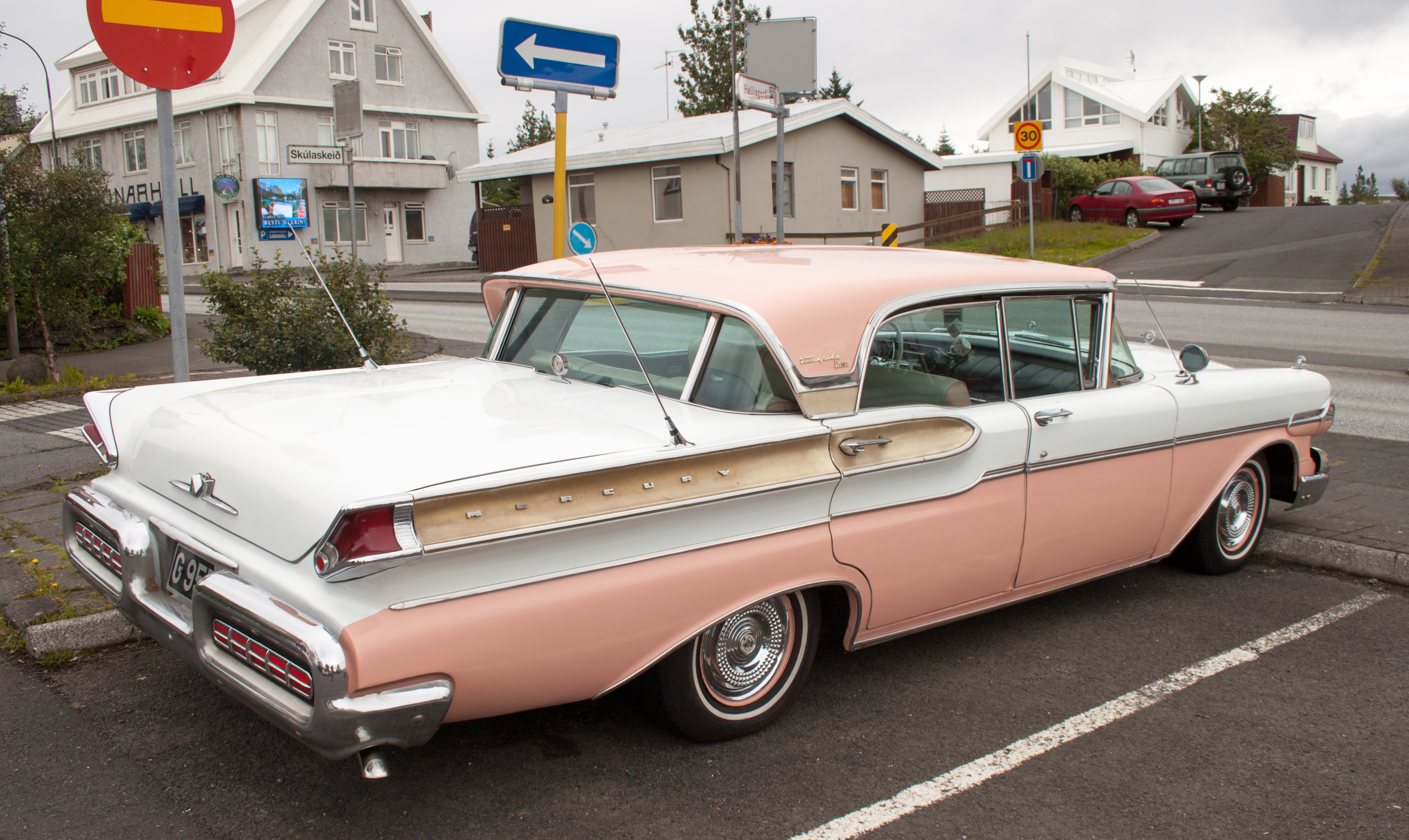
A 1957 Turnpike Cruiser 4-door hardtop. Rear window closed

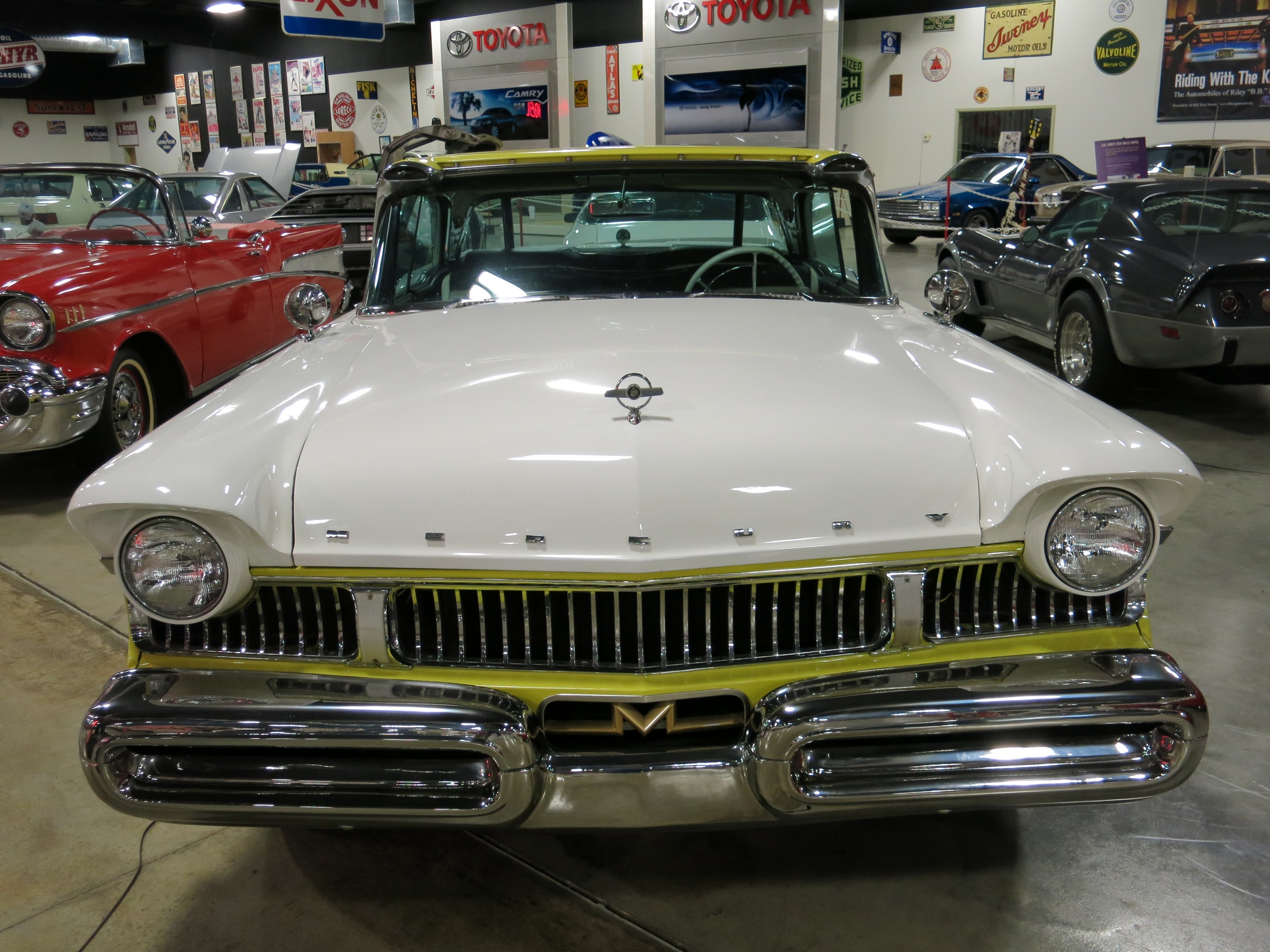
A 1957 Turnpike Cruiser. Rare version produced with single headlamps

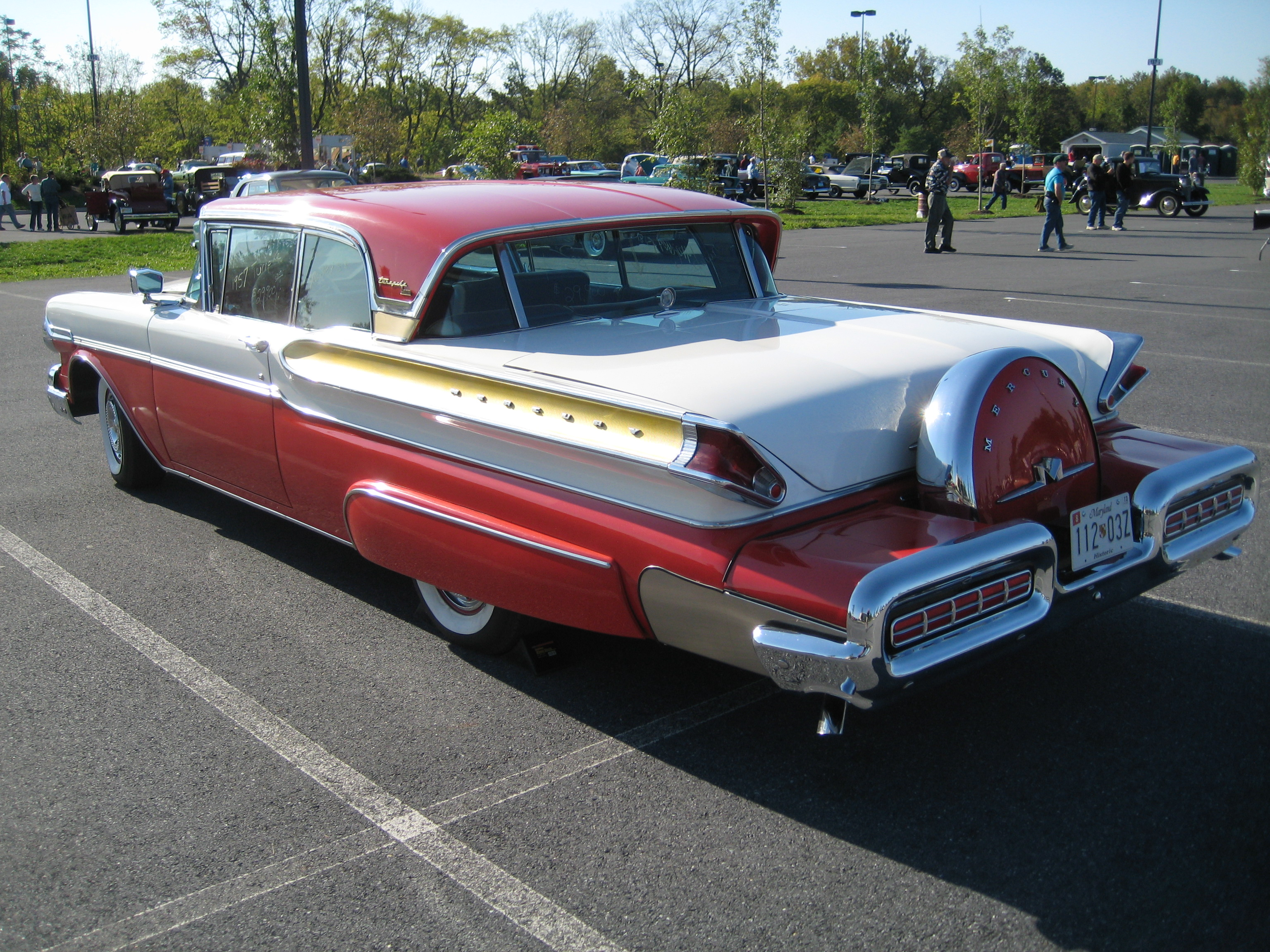
Rear view, showing optional Continental tire kit
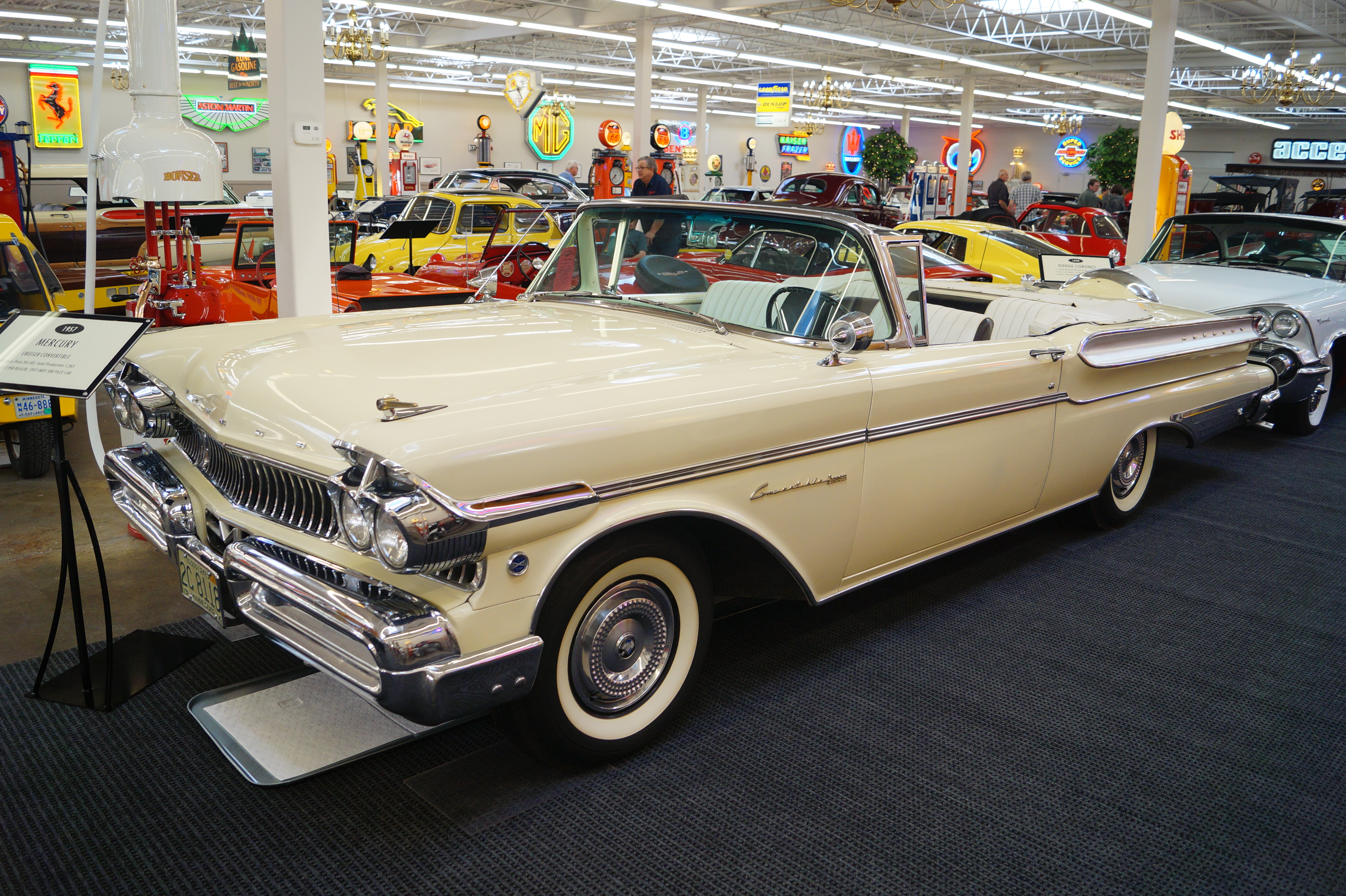
A 1957 Mercury Convertible Cruiser. Produced as an Indianapolis 500 pace car replica.

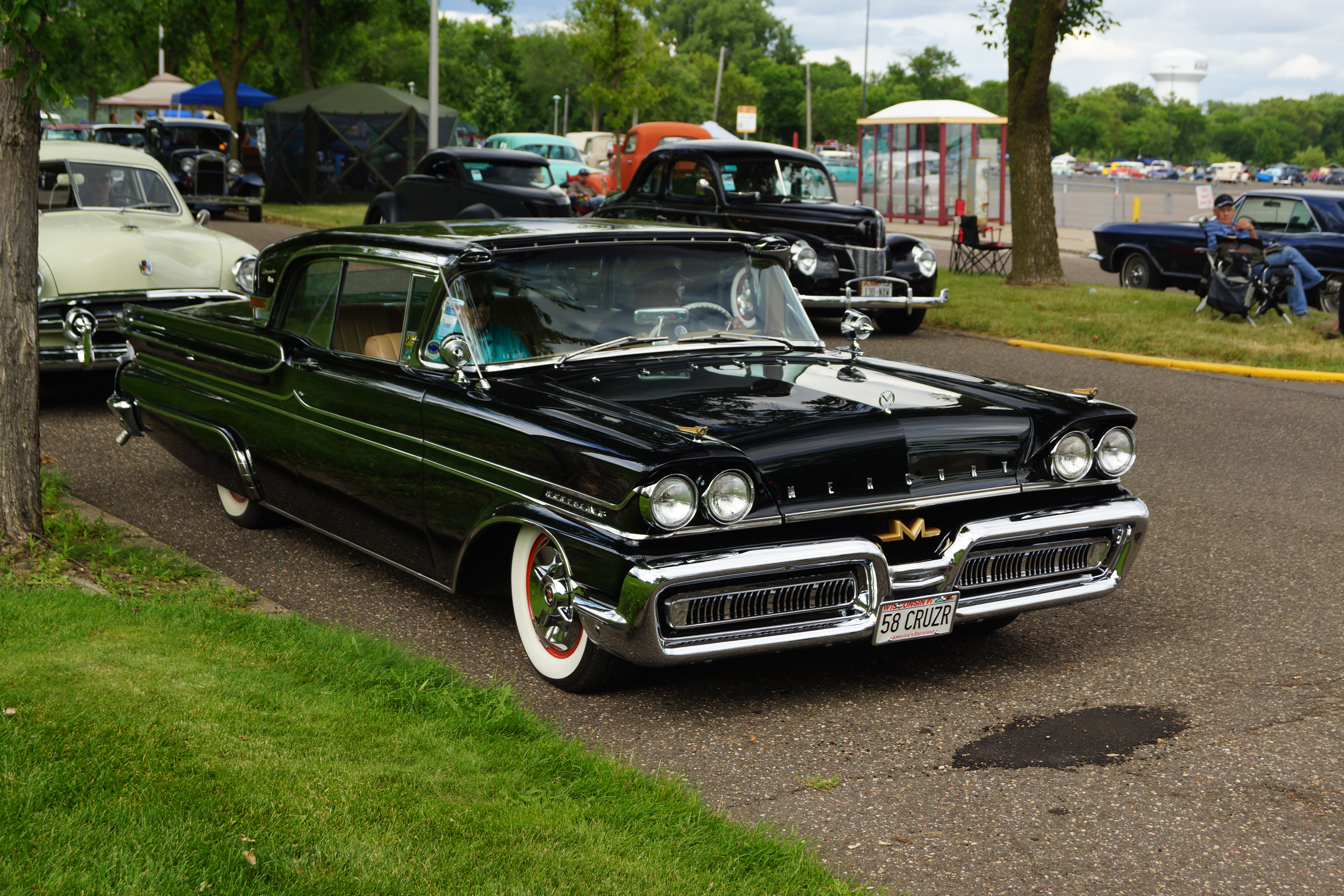
A 1958 Montclair Turnpike Cruiser

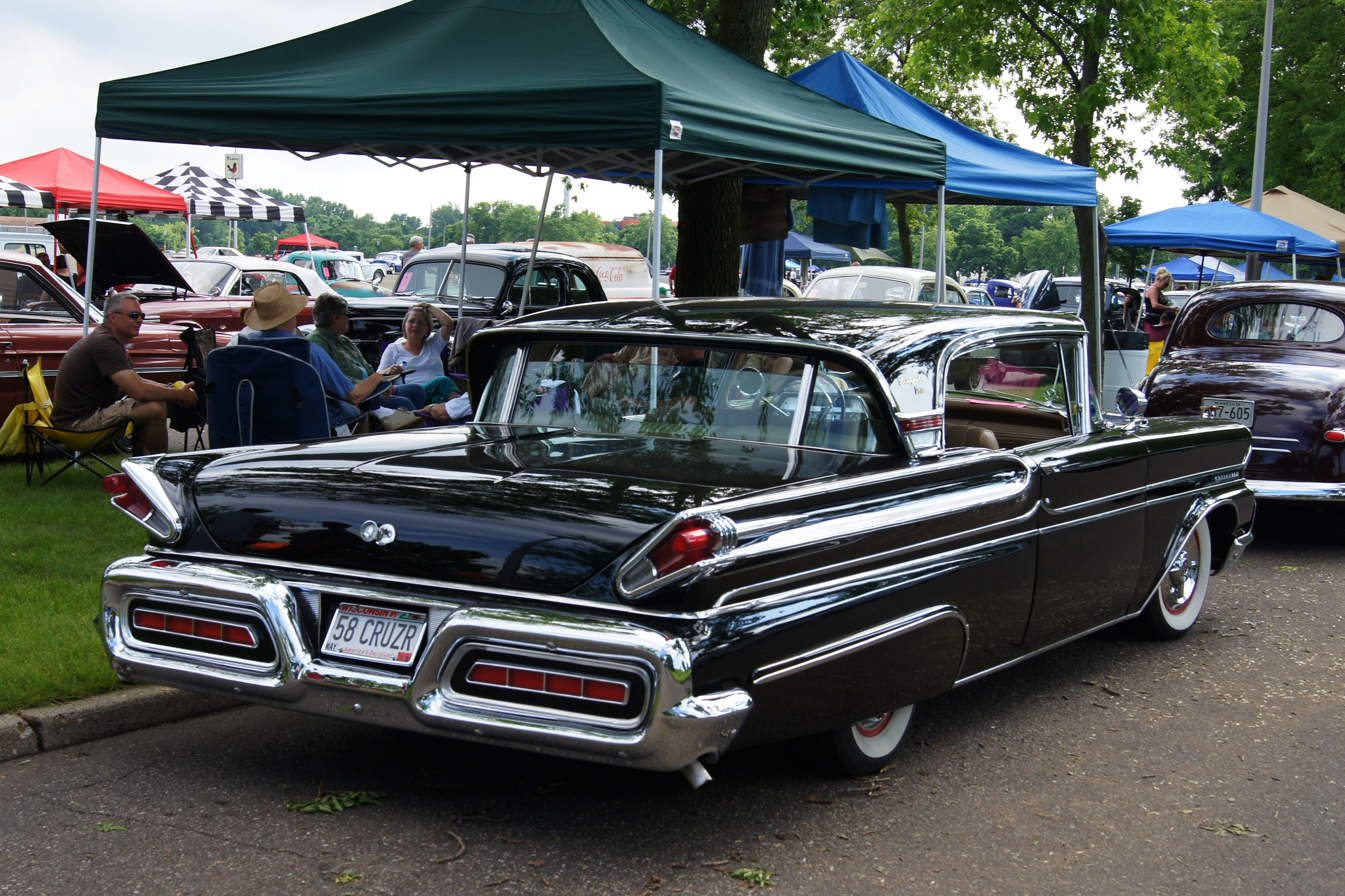
A 1958 Montclair Turnpike Cruiser

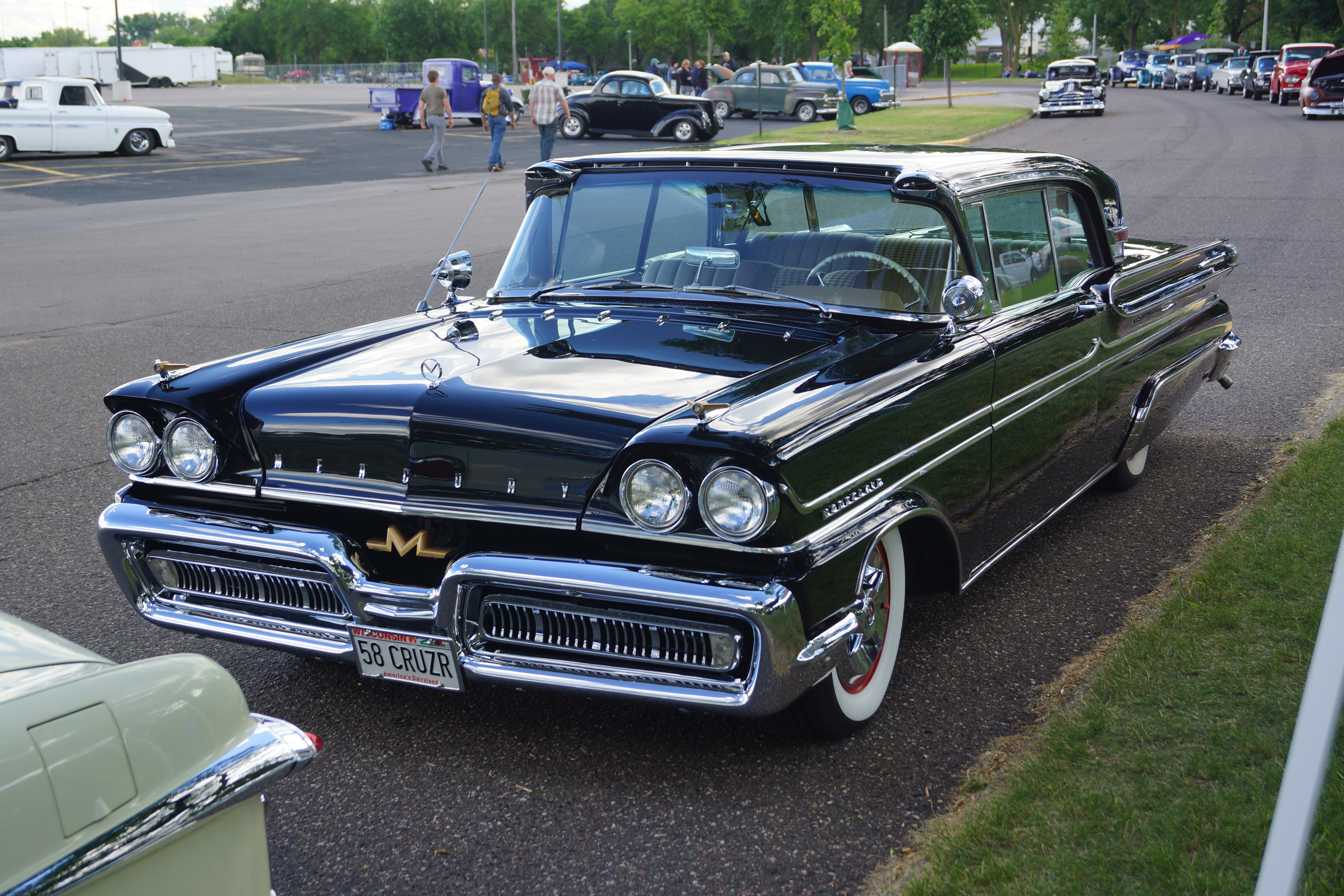
A 1958 Montclair Turnpike Cruiser, showing gold "big M" badge

== Sales ==
1957-1958 Mercury Turnpike Cruiser production
Year	Sales	Notes
1957	16,861	1,265 Convertible Cruisers 4 pace cars
1958	6,407	
Total	23,268	
