= Ford Explorer Sport Trac =

American pickup truck, 2001–2010

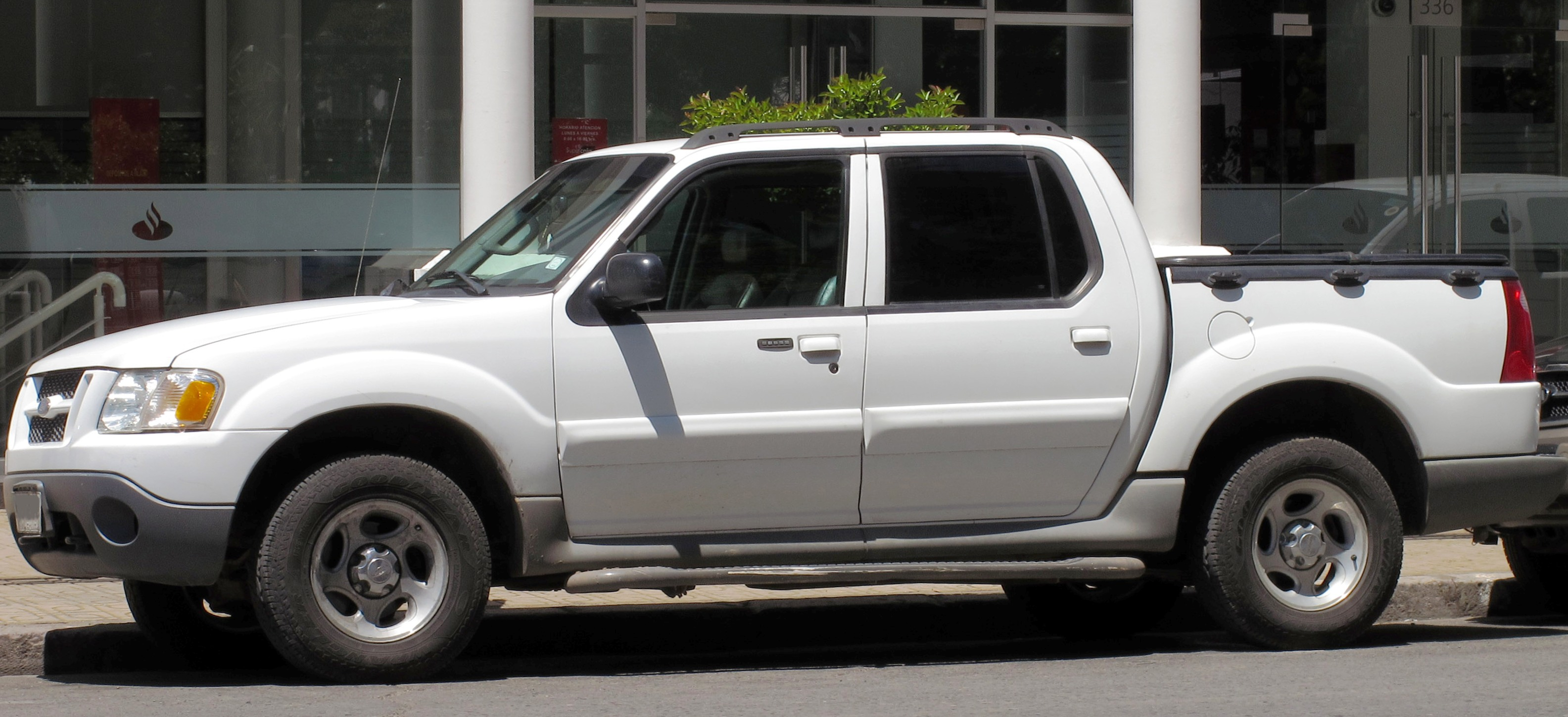
- 2004 Ford Explorer Sport Trac

Overview
- Manufacturer: Ford Motor Company
- Production: 2000–2010
- Model years: 2001–2005; 2007–2010
- Assembly: United States: Louisville, Kentucky (Louisville Assembly Plant)

Body and chassis
- Class: Mid-size pickup truck (Class 1)
- Chassis: Body-on-frame

Chronology
- Successor: Ford Ranger (T6)

The Ford Explorer Sport Trac (also shortened to Ford Sport Trac) is a mid-size pickup truck that was manufactured and marketed by Ford Motor Company for the North American market. The first mid-sized pickup truck produced by Ford, the Sport Trac was marketed from the 2001 to the 2010 model years (skipping the 2006 model year). Sized between the Ranger (whose crew cab variants were sold outside of North America) and the F-150, the Sport Trac largely competed against crew-cab variants of the midsize Chevrolet Colorado/GMC Canyon, Dodge Dakota, Nissan Frontier, and Toyota Tacoma.

Produced over two generations, the Ford Explorer Sport Trac shared its chassis and much of its body from the Ford Explorer SUV (with the pickup truck bed designed specifically for the model line). All production was sourced from the Louisville Assembly Plant in Louisville, Kentucky (taking the place of the Ford Ranger).

As Ford developed the fifth-generation Ford Explorer as a unibody crossover for the 2011 model year, the Sport Trac was phased out of the model line, with production ending in October 2010. Closely matching the Sport Trac in size, the fourth-generation Ford Ranger serves the same market function in its SuperCrew four-door crew cab configuration.

== First generation (2001–2005) ==
First generation
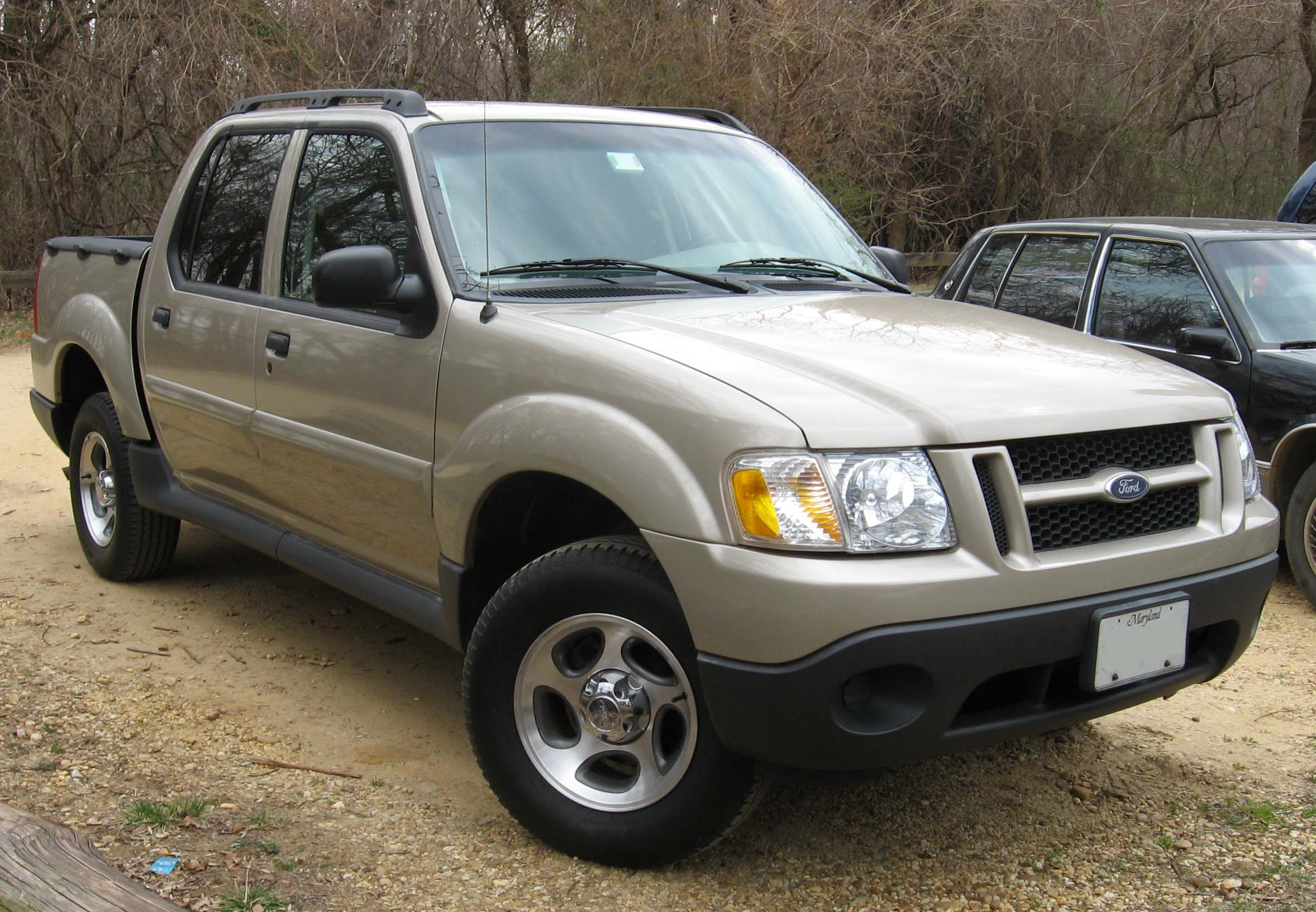
- Ford Explorer Sport Trac XLT

Overview
- Production: February 2000–2005
- Model years: 2001–2005

Body and chassis
- Body style: 4-door pickup truck
- Related: Ford Explorer; Mercury Mountaineer; Ford Ranger

Powertrain
- Engine: 4.0 L Cologne SOHC V6
- Transmission: 5-speed M5OD manual 5-speed 5R55E automatic

Dimensions
- Wheelbase: 125.9 in (3,198 mm)
- Length: 205.9 in (5,230 mm)
- Width: 71.8 in (1,824 mm)
- Height: 70.5 in (1,791 mm); 70.4 in (1,788 mm) (2003 4WD); 70.1 in (1,781 mm) (2001–02)

Introduced in February 2000 as an early 2001 model, the Ford Explorer Sport Trac was brought to market. While marketed as a variant of the Ford Explorer SUV model line, the Sport Trac was functionally a crew-cab mid-size pickup truck. Slotted in between the Ford Ranger SuperCab (crew-cab Ford Rangers were never marketed in North America; until the 2019 return) and the F-150 SuperCrew, the Sport Trac became the first mid-size pickup truck produced by Ford. In terms of layout, the Sport Trac was followed by the Chevrolet Avalanche and Honda Ridgeline, both crew cab pickup truck derived from SUVs.

=== Chassis ===
The Ford Explorer Sport Trac shares the Ford UN105 platform with the second-generation Ford Explorer. To accommodate for the addition of a pickup bed, the wheelbase of the Explorer Sport Trac was lengthened from 111.6 inches to 125.9 inches (matching the Ford Ranger SuperCab). As with the Ford Explorer and Ford Explorer Sport, rear-wheel drive was standard, with ControlTrac four-wheel drive as an optional powertrain configuration. A 210 hp (157 kW) SOHC 4.0L V6 was the sole engine offering. A five-speed manual transmission was standard, with a five-speed automatic transmission available as an option.

During the 2001 model year, the 4.0L V6 underwent revisions, shifting from an alloy intake manifold to a composite design; the oil filler cap switched locations from the driver side to the passenger side of the engine. For 2002, the chassis was given four-wheel disc brakes (replacing rear drum brakes) with the rear discs being the largest offered on a solid rear axle Explorer (11.83" vs 11.2"). The fuel tank was also enlarged from 20 gallons to 22 gallons.

=== Body ===
Built on a lengthened Ford Explorer chassis, the Sport Trac was constructed using parts from three Ford vehicles, with the addition of model-specific pickup truck bed. Sharing the front fascia and fenders with the two-door Explorer Sport, the four-door cab was constructed from the four-door Ford Explorer (with modified rear doors). Designed specifically for the Sport Trac, the 50-inch long pickup bed was constructed entirely of plastic composite material; the tailgate was shared with the Ford F-150 SuperCrew. To add additional load space for the shortened pickup bed, Ford offered a metal load extender to be used with the tailgate. Another option included a removable hard plastic tonneau cover for the pickup bed.

Sharing its interior with the two-door and four-door Explorer (which shared much of its dashboard with the Ranger), the Sport Trac retained the fold-down rear seats of the four-door Explorer to expand storage space. A full rubber floor was standard (as in base-trim pickup trucks), with berber-style carpet floor mats. The Sport Trac was configured with a power-retractable "Breezeway" rear window (a feature last used by Ford on the 1965 Mercury line) in place of a sliding rear window.

During 2002, several changes were made to the exterior badging, with "Explorer" removed from the doors and "Sport Trac" (on the tailgate) changed to chrome, from red/white plastic. In another revision, the B-pillars were changed from black to body-colored. For 2004, the gray bumpers and side skirts were darkened in color; a new option offered body-color bumpers and side skirts while the interior was updated with a new instrument cluster with a digital odometer.

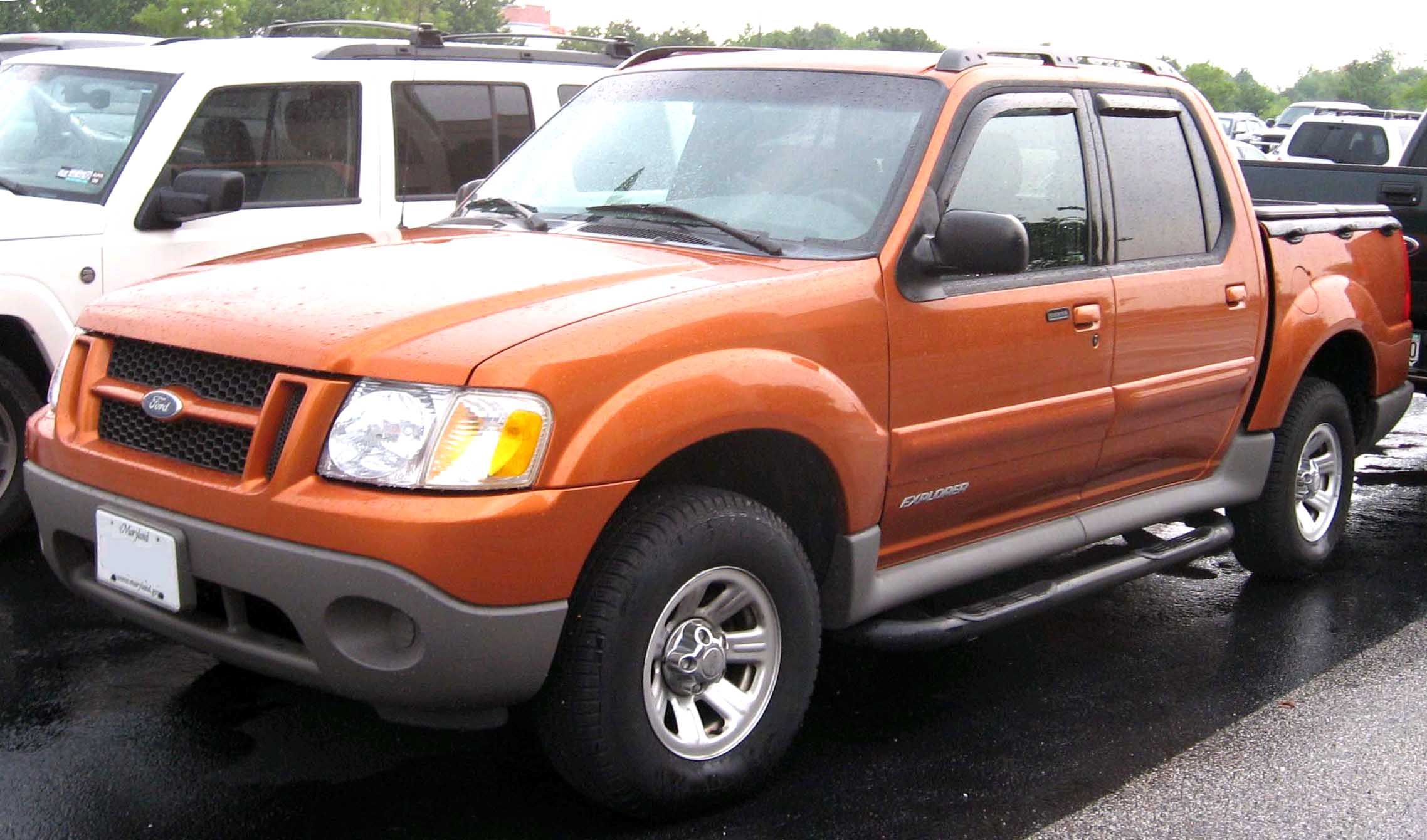
2001 Ford Explorer Sport Trac XLS

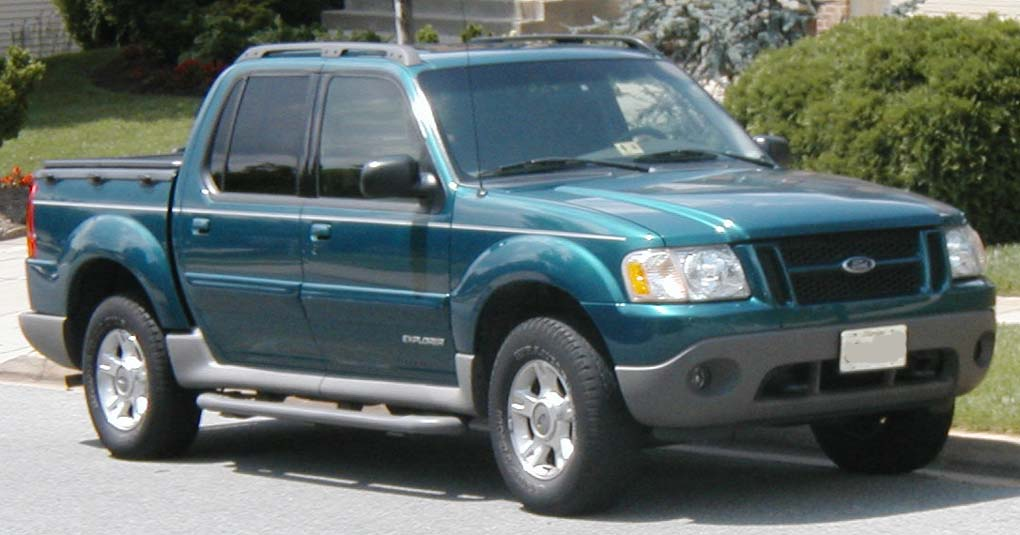
2001 Ford Explorer Sport Trac XLT

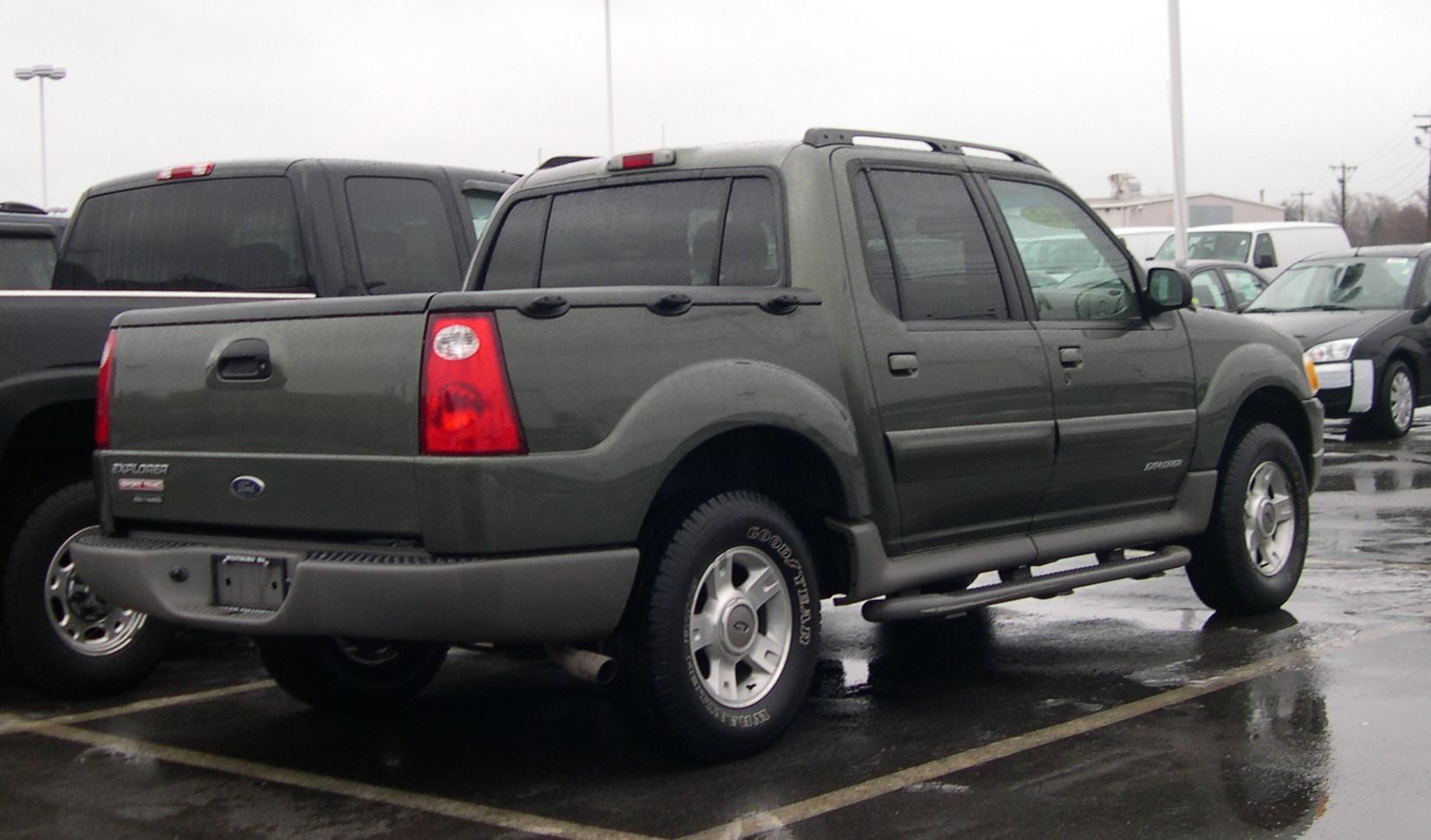
2002 Ford Explorer Sport Trac, rear ¾

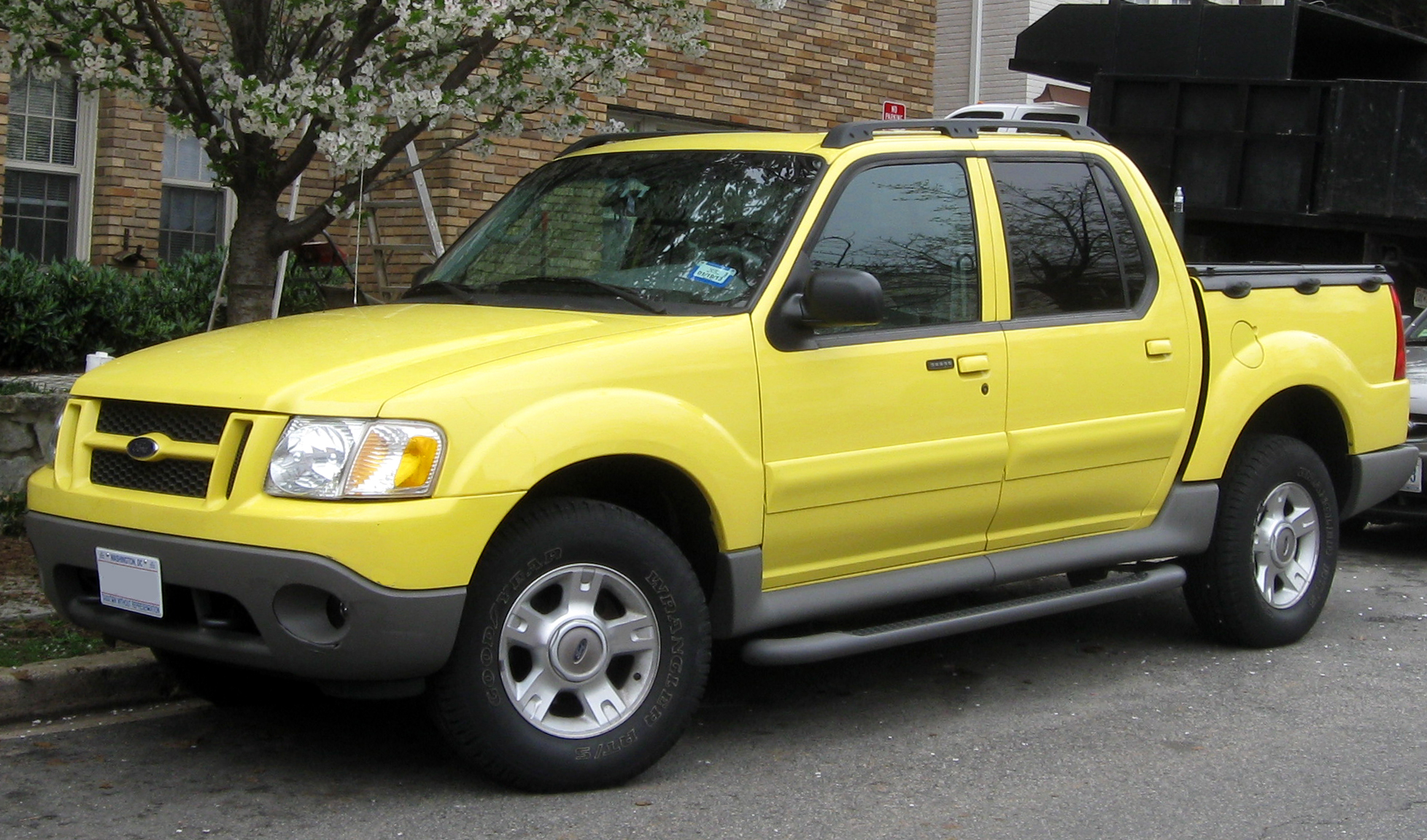
2003–2004 Ford Explorer Sport Trac XLT

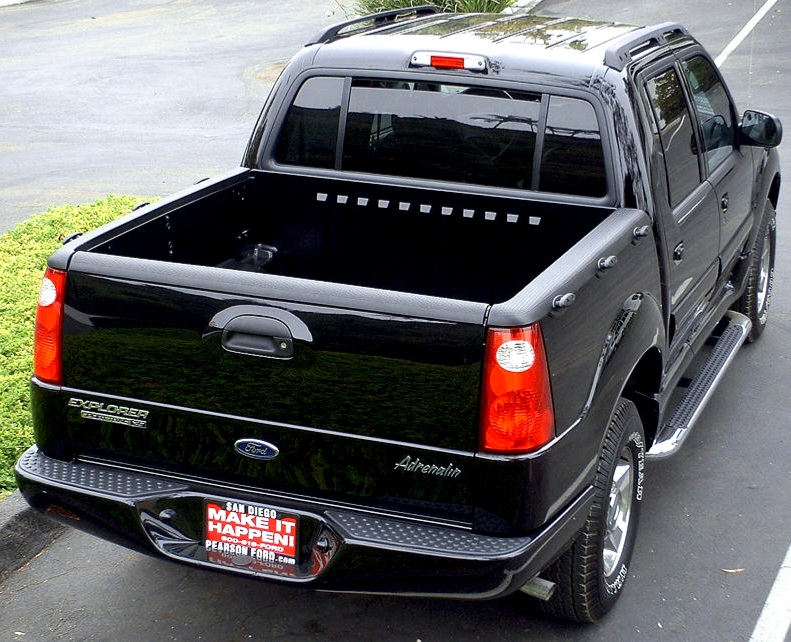
2005 Ford Explorer Sport Trac Adrenalin Edition

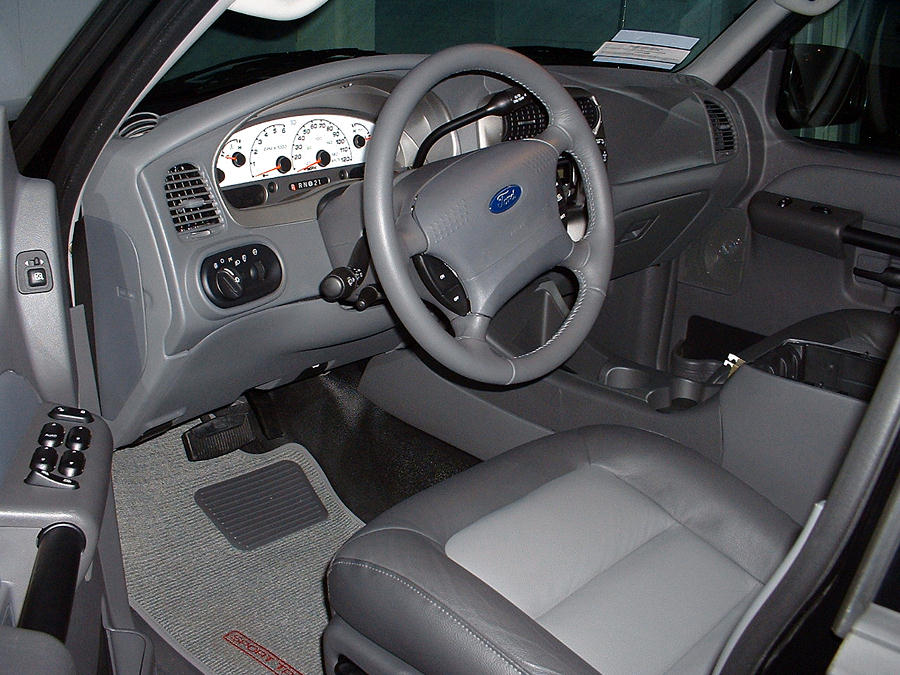
2005 Ford Explorer Sport Trac Adrenalin Edition Interior

=== Trim ===
In line with the second-generation Ford Explorer four-door, beginning in 2002, the Ford Explorer Sport Trac was offered in a XLS trim level (steel wheels, cloth seats) and an XLT trim level (alloy wheels), and 2003, an XLT Premium trim level (leather seats)

- XLS - Included: cloth upholstery, styled-steel rims, air conditioning, an AM/FM stereo with single-CD player and four speakers (60W), power doors and windows with auto drivers side window, and a tachometer.
- XLT - Added: automatic transmission, alloy rims, an AM/FM premium stereo with single-CD and cassette players and four premium speakers (80W), keyless entry, speed control, leather-wrapped steering wheel, and power mirrors. Leather seats are an option.
- XLT Premium - Added: Power driver's seat, rear audio controls with headphone jacks, automatic headlamps, fog lamps, overhead console, and tow hooks (4x4 models only).
- Adrenalin Edition - in 2005 Ford also added a few tester models, labeled the Adrenalin Edition. They were a limited-production model which added body colored side moldings, wheels, special interiors with a sport designed leather combinations and unique fabric floor mats, a factory installed plastic bed liner, a Pioneer 500 watt 6-disc CD changer stereo with upgraded speakers and a small subwoofer built in and a unique lighter backing of the instrument cluster (speedometer, tachometer, oil, temperature gauges). A bed extender and fog lights came standard. Special italicized badging on the lower right of the tailgate indicated the special options and appearance package model name of Adrenalin.

== Second generation (2007–2010) ==
Second generation
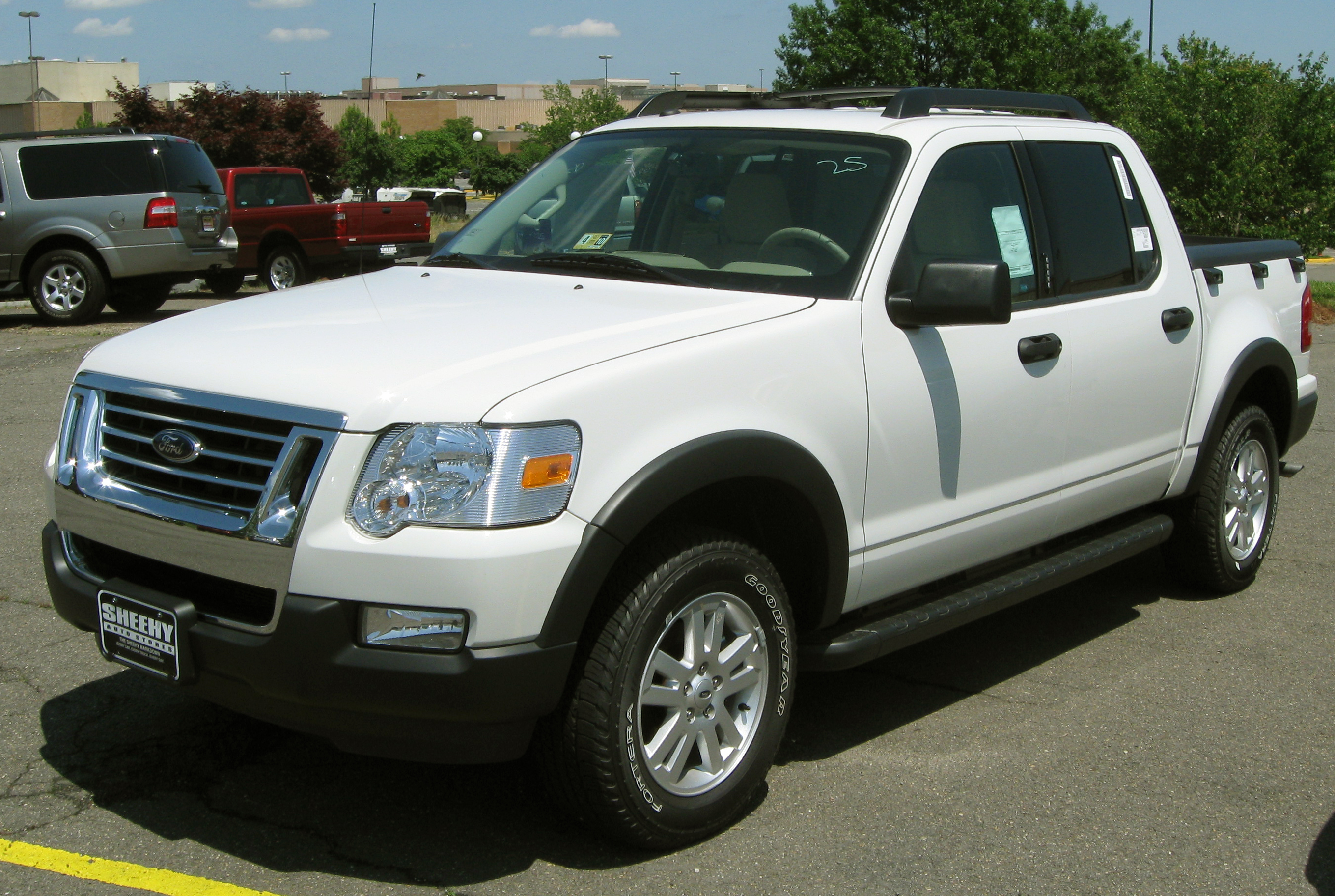
- 2009 Ford Explorer Sport Trac XLT

Overview
- Production: 2006–2010
- Model years: 2007–2010
- Designer: Chelsia Lau

Body and chassis
- Body style: 4-door pickup truck
- Related: Ford Explorer; Mercury Mountaineer

Powertrain
- Engine: 4.0 L Cologne V6; 4.6 L 24-valve Modular V8
- Transmission: 5-speed 5R55E automatic 6-speed 6R automatic

Dimensions
- Wheelbase: 130.5 in (3,315 mm)
- Length: 210.2 in (5,339 mm)
- Width: 73.7 in (1,872 mm)
- Height: 2009–10: 71.6 in (1,819 mm); 2007–08: 72.5 in (1,842 mm)

In 2006, Ford released the second-generation Ford Explorer Sport Trac. After skipping the 2006 model year, the new design was released as the 2007 model year. Adopting many updates of the 2006 redesign of the Ford Explorer/Mercury Mountaineer, the Sport Trac received a redesigned frame and the introduction of several safety features, including stability control and active rollover protection, marketed as AdvanceTrac and Roll Stability Control.

=== Chassis ===
The second-generation Ford Explorer Sport Trac shares the Ford U251 chassis with the fourth-generation Ford Explorer. As part of the redesign, the wheelbase was stretched to 130.5 inches (4.6 inches longer than the previous generation). In a break from its predecessor, the 2007 Sport Trac adopted the four-wheel independent suspension of the Ford Explorer; after the Honda Ridgeline and Hummer H1, the Sport Trac became the third pickup truck with such a suspension layout.

As a standard engine, the second-generation Sport Trac retained the 4.0L V6 of its predecessor. For the first time the Sport Trac offered a V8 engine option, the 292 hp (218 kW) 4.6L 24-valve Modular V8 used in the F-150 pickups. The five-speed manual transmission was discontinued, with the 5R55W five-speed automatic becoming standard equipment with the 4.0L V6 and the 4.6 3V V8 (the 6R60 was also mated to earlier model V8s); in 2009 the 6R80 6 speed automatic replaced the 5 speed behind the V8.

=== Body ===
Again derived from a lengthened Ford Explorer, the second-generation Sport Trac was fitted with a plastic composite pickup truck bed. As the two-door Ford Explorer Sport was discontinued in 2003, the second-generation Sport Trac adopted the front fascia of the four-door Explorer. In a minor styling shift, while the large front fender flares were withdrawn, the rear ones continued, styled similar to the F-150 FlareSide pickup bed.

Largely sharing its rear doors with the Ford Explorer (with a lack of a rear wheel cutout in the lower corners, due to the longer wheelbase), the Sport Trac retained a Hofmeister kink in the rear quarter windows. As with its predecessor, the Sport Trac retained the power-retractable "breezeway" rear window.

For 2008, the Adrenalin appearance package (see below) was added, along with the addition of SYNC as an infotainment media system.

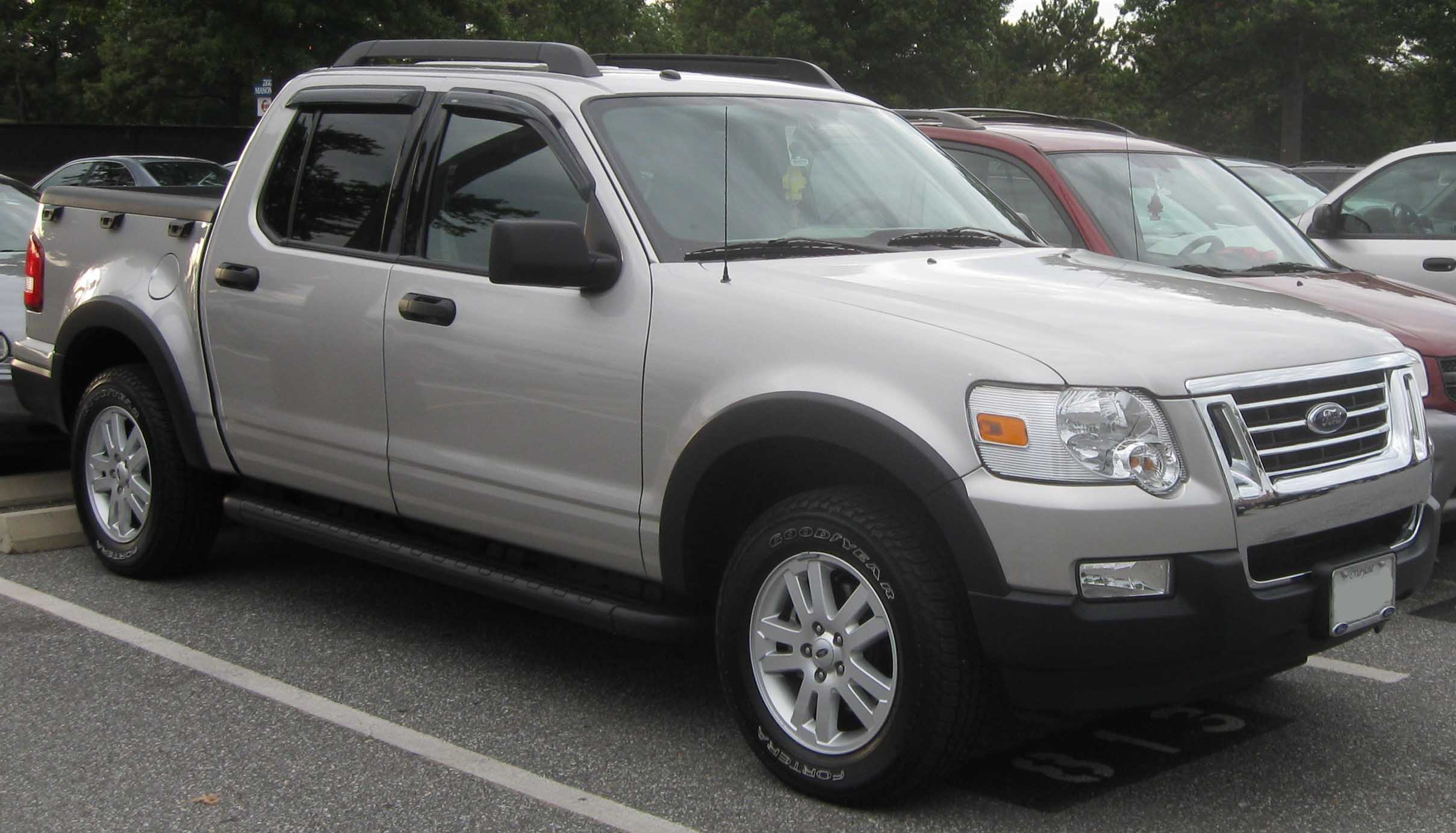
2007–2008 Ford Explorer Sport Trac XLT

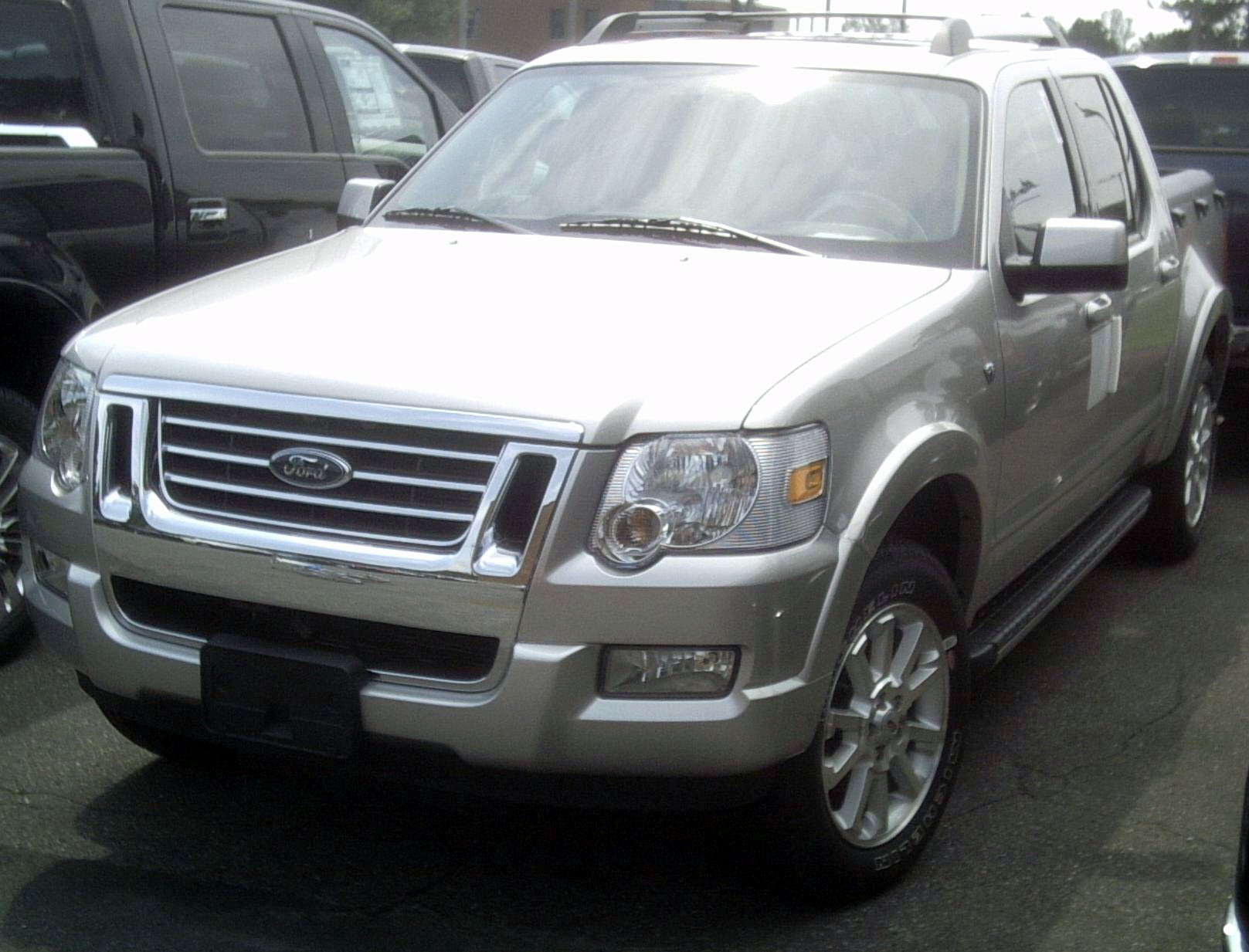
2007 Ford Explorer Sport Trac Limited

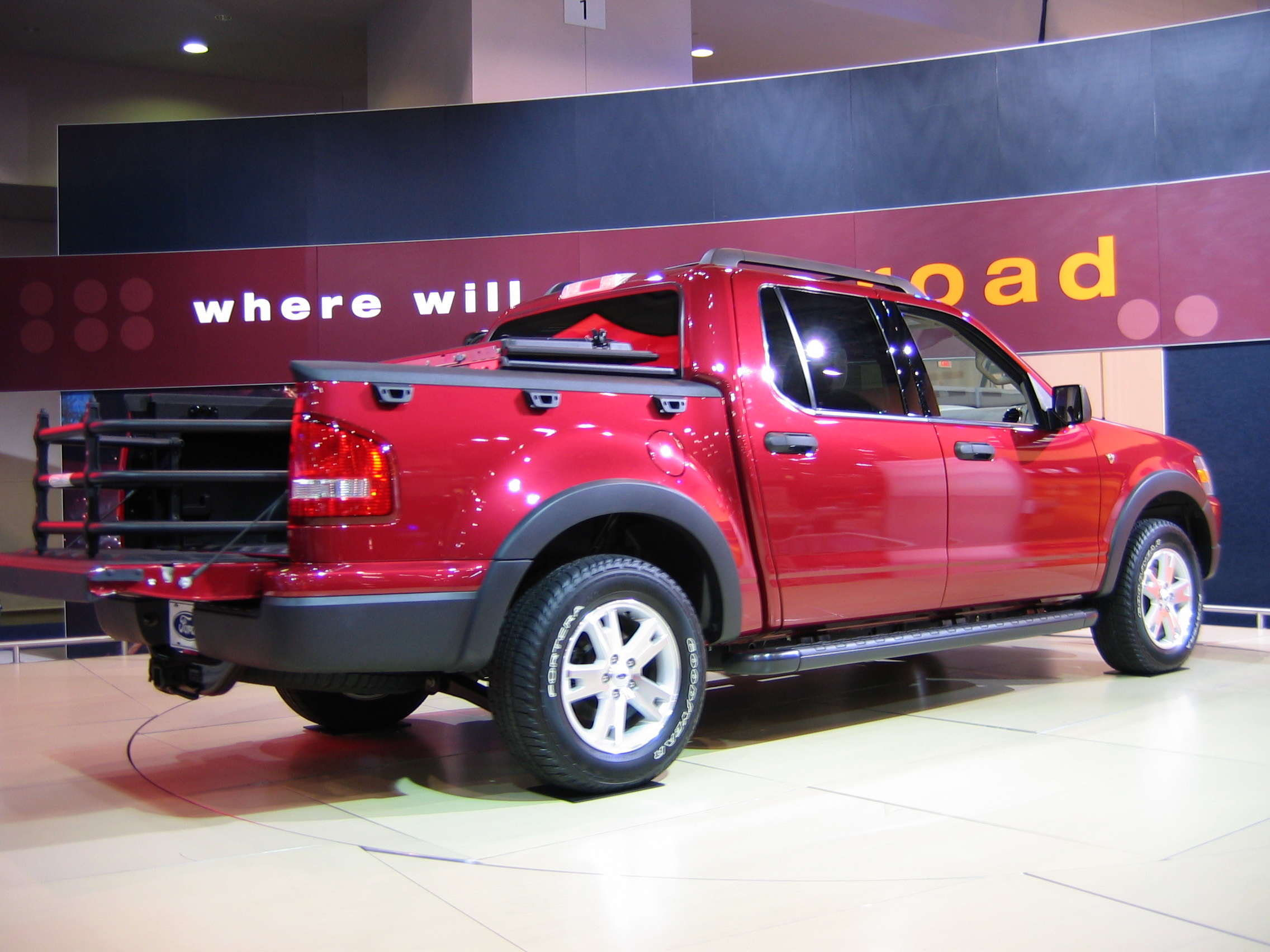
Ford Explorer Sport Trac XLT, showing bed extender deployed

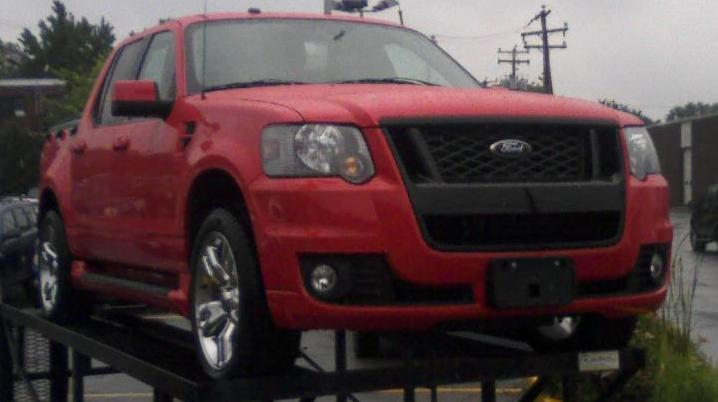
Ford Explorer Sport Trac Adrenalin

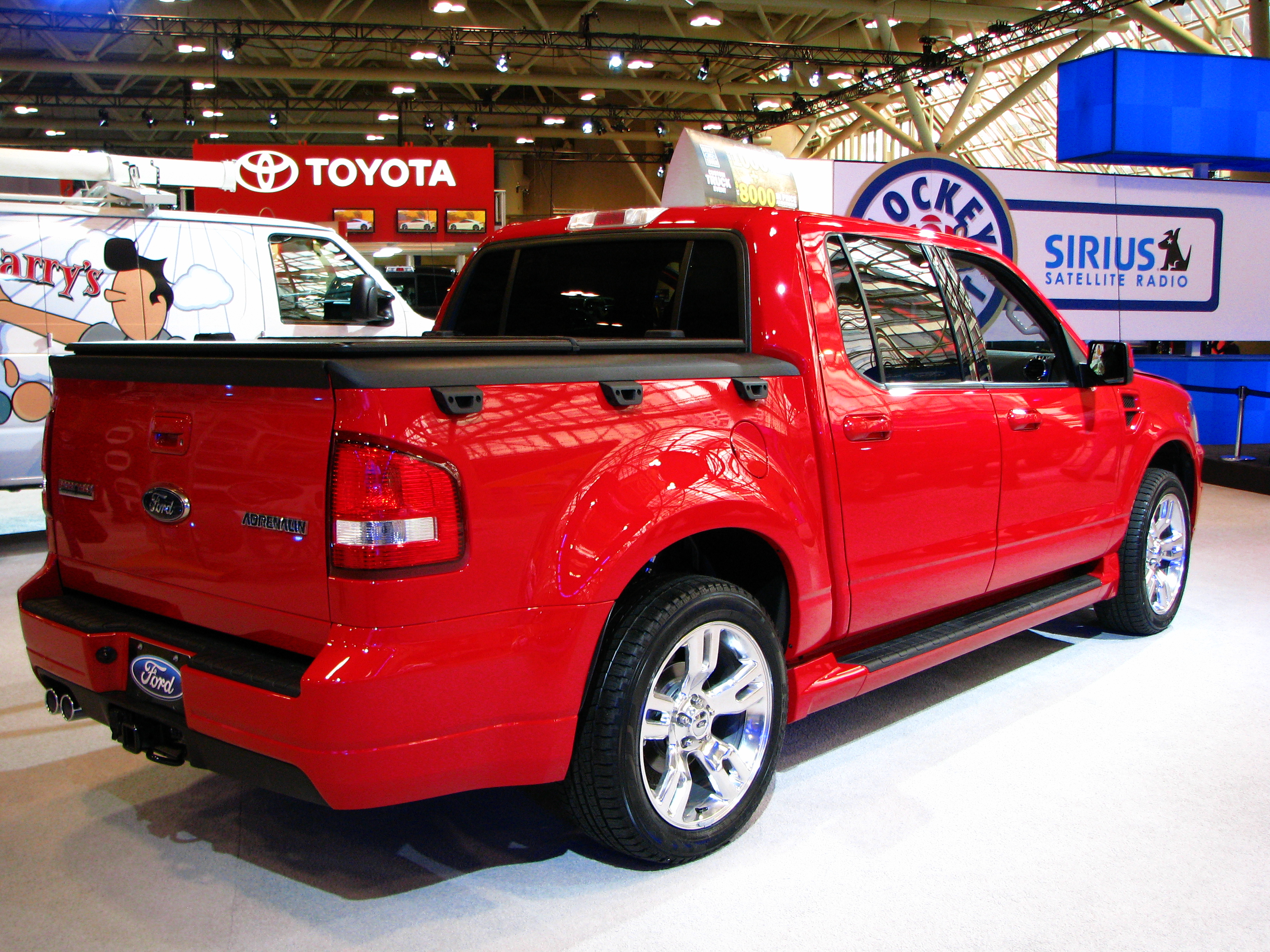
Ford Explorer Sport Trac Adrenalin, rear ¾ (tailgate up)

=== Trim ===
In contrast to the Explorer SUV, the second-generation Sport Trac was offered with only two trim levels, both common to the Explorer. On the Sport Trac, the XLT (mid-range on the Explorer) served as the standard trim level, with the Limited serving as the upgraded trim level. Along with the standardization of many optional features of the XLT, the monochromatic Limited replaces the black lower body trim of the XLT with a body-color trim.

During the development of the second-generation Sport Trac, Ford SVT developed the Sport Trac Adrenalin. Powered by a supercharged version of the 4.6L V8 (producing 390 hp (291 kW)), the Adrenalin was intended as a 2007 successor for the F-150 Lightning pickup truck. As part of The Way Forward, the Sport Trac Adrenalin project was cancelled. For 2008, the Adrenalin became part of the Sport Trac model line as an option package. While the SVT-supercharged V8 was not included, many design elements of the model were included, including its blacked-out headlights, black grille, model-specific bumpers, model-specific front fenders (distinguished by side vents), monochromatic interior trim, integrated running boards, and 20-inch alloy wheels.

- XLT - Included: cloth upholstery, power driver's seat, power mirrors, power locks, power windows with automatic driver's side window, four spoke steering wheel, overhead console, illuminated entry, air conditioning, 16" alloy rims, security alarm, and an AM/FM radio with a single-CD player with MP3 capability.
- Limited - Added: leather-wrapped steering wheel with shift knob, 18" alloy rims, fog lamps, automatic headlamps, body color bumpers and mirrors, and a floor console.
