= Breezeway Records =

Record label based in Charlottesville

- Genre: Jazz, experimental
- Country of origin: U.S.
- Location: Charlottesville, Virginia
- Official website: www.breezewayrecords.com

Breezeway Records is a small, independent record label based in Charlottesville, Virginia. Breezeway works with four artists and has released a total of six records.

== List of albums ==
- Soko – In November Sunlight (1996)
- Tim Reynolds & Michael Sokolowski – Common Margins (1999)
- Worth Proffitt, Tim Reynolds, Michael Sokolowski – Offering (2000)
- Michael Sokolowski – Monday (2001)
- Worth Proffitt, Tim Reynolds, Michael Sokolowski – Live Offering (2004)
- Soko – Two (2005)

== See also ==
- List of record labels
