= Two (Soko album) =

Studio album by Soko
- Released: May 17, 2005
- Studio: Haunted Hollow Studio, Charlottesville, Virginia
- Genre: World fusion, jazz fusion
- Length: 72:18
- Label: Breezeway

Soko chronology
In November Sunlight (1996)	Two (2005)	Sokoband (2010)

Two is the second album by Charlottesville, Virginia eclectic duo, Soko, released in 2005, almost ten years after their debut album, In November Sunlight, released in 1996. Soko started out as a trio until drummer John Gilmore, who appeared on the first album, left the band. Gilmore appears as a guest performer on this album. In addition to Gilmore, ten various artists are heard, including guitarist Tim Reynolds. The album was recorded in the Dave Matthews Band's Haunted Hollow Studio, and features several tracks which were performed live by Soko throughout the 1990s, as well as several new studio songs, and a cover of The Beatles' "Rain." The songs "Plant the Sky," "Joy of Love," and "Rain" were edited and released as singles for radio play.

== Track listing ==
1. "Storyteller" – 2:08
2. "Plant the Sky" – 8:06
3. "Speak Up" – 4:50
4. "Dark Beam of the Seine" – 6:08
5. "On the Matter of Coping" – 3:18
6. "Antidote" – 5:57
7. "In-between, I" – 3:54
8. "Joy of Love" – 15:55
9. "Rain" – 9:44
10. "Bamboo Cool" – 4:41
11. "Stella: Reflections" – 2:35
12. "In-between, II" – 5:02

== Personnel ==
Soko

- Michael Sokolowski – piano, synthesizers, tar, bells, xylophone, shakers, electric guitar
- Houston Ross – bass, vocals, talking drum, log drum, nylon string guitar

Guest musicians

- Tim Reynolds – guitar
- David Darling – cello
- John D'Earth – trumpet
- Olumide – percussion
- Will Coles – drums
- John Gilmore – drums
- Davina Jackson – vocals
- Peter Spaar – acoustic bass
- Chris Melchoir – violins, viola
- Worth Proffitt – percussion
- Peter Markush – cello
