= Sokolovsky (surname) =

Sokolovsky, Sokolovski, Sokolovskiy, Sokolovskyy, etc. (Russian: Соколовский, Ukrainian: Соколовський) are different transliterations of the same masculine Russian and Ukrainian surname, with feminine forms Sokolovskaya/Sokolovska. Czech surname: Sokolovský.

Notable people with this surname include:

== People ==
- Aleksandra Sokolovskaya (1872 – c. 1938), Russian revolutionary; wife of Leon Trotsky
- Andriy Sokolovskyy (born 1978), Ukrainian high jumper
- Aron Sokolovsky (1884–?), Soviet economist
- Denys Sokolovskyi (born 1979), retired Ukrainian professional association football player
- Evgeny Sokolovsky (born 1978), Ukrainian racing driver
- Evžen Sokolovský (1925–1998), Czech television director (Muž na radnici)
- Grigori Sokolovsky (born 1973), Russian footballer
- Irina Sokolovskaya (born 1983), Russian basketball player
- Mikhail Sokolovsky (disambiguation), multiple people
- Mykhaylo Sokolovskyi (born 1951), Ukrainian professional football coach and a former player
- Marusya Sokolovska (1902–c. 1919), Ukrainian insurgent commander
- Vasily Sokolovsky (1897–1968), Soviet military commander
- Vlad Sokolovsky (born 1991), Russian singer
- Yuri Sokolovsky (born 1995), Ukrainian footballer
