= Sokolovskoye, Republic of Bashkortostan =

Sokolovskoye Соколовское
- Village
- Location within Bashkortostan Location within Russia
- Coordinates: 55°03′N 56°22′E
- Country: Russia
- Region: Bashkortostan
- District: Blagoveshchensky District
- Time zone: UTC+5:00

Sokolovskoye (Russian: Соколовское) is a rural locality (a village) in Ilyino-Polyansky Selsoviet, Blagoveshchensky District, Bashkortostan, Russia. The population was 63 as of 2010. There are 2 streets.

== Geography ==
Sokolovskoye is located 33 km east of Blagoveshchensk (the district's administrative centre) by road. Sitniki is the nearest rural locality.
