= Sokolovsky, Novokhopyorsky District, Voronezh Oblast =

Sokolovsky Соколовский
- Settlement
- Location within Voronezh Oblast Location within Russia
- Coordinates: 50°59′N 41°09′E
- Country: Russia
- Region: Voronezh Oblast
- District: Novokhopyorsky District
- Time zone: UTC+3:00

Sokolovsky (Russian: Соколо́вский) is a rural locality (a settlement) in Kolenovskoye Rural Settlement, Novokhopyorsky District, Voronezh Oblast, Russia. The population was 66 as of 2010.

== Geography ==
Sokolovsky is located 53 km southwest of Novokhopyorsk (the district's administrative centre) by road. Dolinovsky is the nearest rural locality.
