= Sokolovsky, Bobrovsky District, Voronezh Oblast =

Sokolovsky Соколовский
- Khutor
- Location within Voronezh Oblast Location within Russia
- Coordinates: 51°02′N 39°49′E
- Country: Russia
- Region: Voronezh Oblast
- District: Bobrovsky District
- Time zone: UTC+3:00

Sokolovsky (Russian: Соколовский) is a rural locality (a khutor) in Nikolskoye Rural Settlement, Bobrovsky District, Voronezh Oblast, Russia. The population was 110 as of 2010.

== Geography ==
Sokolovsky is located 21 km southwest of Bobrov (the district's administrative centre) by road. Peskovatka is the nearest rural locality.
