= Mikhail Sokolovsky =

Mikhail Sokolovsky may refer to:

- Mikhail Sokolovsky (composer) (1756 - 1795), Russian composer and conductor
- Mykhaylo Sokolovsky (b. 1951), Soviet footballer and Ukrainian coach
