= John Sokolowski =

Canadian bobsledder

Personal information
- Born: 2 October 1975 (age 49); Chatham, New Brunswick, Canada

Sport
- Sport: Bobsleigh

John Sokolowski (born 2 October 1975) is a retired Canadian bobsledder. He competed in the two man event at the 2002 Winter Olympics. He is the younger brother of fellow Olympian Michael Sokolowski. He is currently a teacher with the Ottawa Catholic School Board
