= Grigori Sokolovsky =

Russian footballer

Personal information
- Full name: Grigori Mikhailovich Sokolovsky
- Date of birth: 26 September 1972 (age 54)
- Place of birth: Tyumen, Russian SFSR
- Height: 1.85 m (6 ft 1 in)
- Position: Goalkeeper

Youth career
- FC Geolog Tyumen

Senior career*
Years	Team	Apps	(Gls)
1990	FC Spartak Tyumen		
1991–1994	FC Dynamo-Gazovik Tyumen	11	(0)
1995–1997	FC Irtysh Tobolsk	79	(0)
1998–2000	FC Tyumen	17	(0)
2005	FC Tobol Tobolsk (amateur)		
- * Club domestic league appearances and goals

Grigori Mikhailovich Sokolovsky (Russian: Григорий Михайлович Соколовский; born 26 September 1972 in Tyumen) is a former Russian football player.
