= Breezeway (car) =

Type of automobile rear window

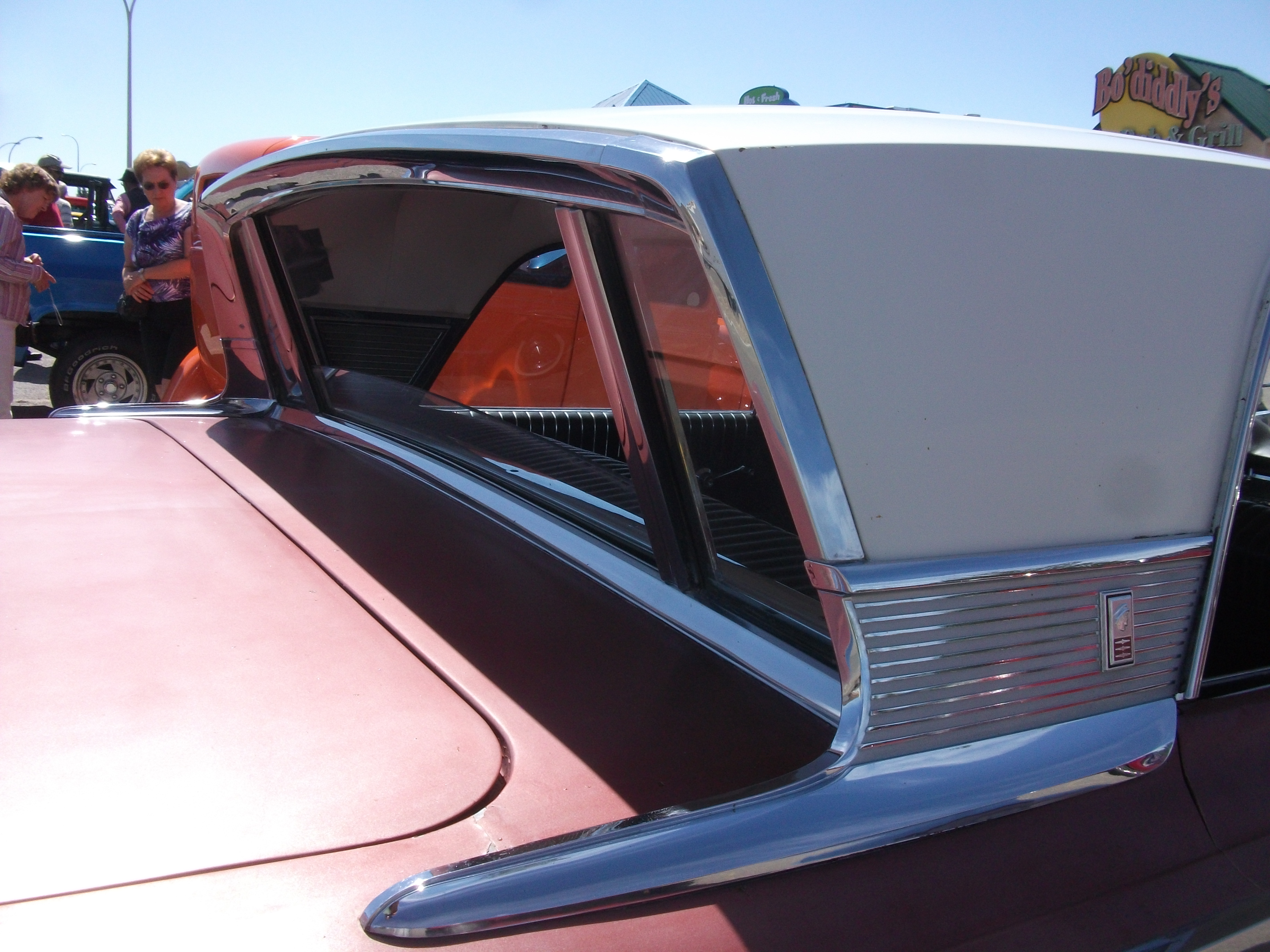
A breezeway rear window on a 1963 Mercury Monterey

Breezeway is a term for a vertical or reverse-slanted, power-operated retractable rear window on sedans. Intended to provide through ventilation. It first appeared on the 1957-1958 Mercury Turnpike Cruisers and the 1958–1960 Continental Mark III, IV, & V. After a break it reappeared on some 1963–1968 full-size Mercurys, including some Park Lanes, Montclairs, and Montereys.

Although never officially referred to as a "breezeway" window, the lowering “backlight” on standard sedans (and the 1958-1960 convertible Lincolns) is not to be confused with the lowering rear window of a station wagon, manual or power.

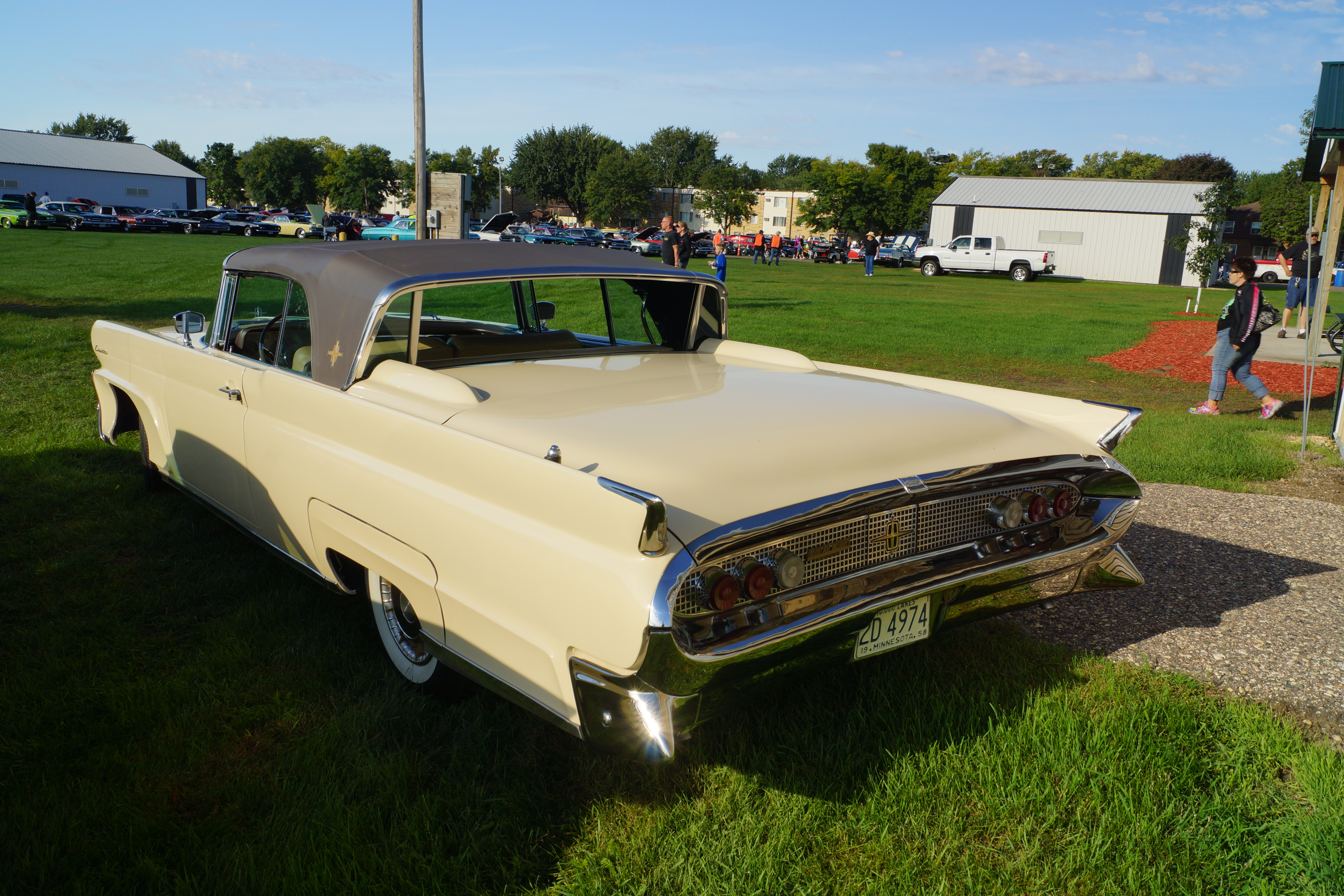
1958 Continental Mark III convertible, retractable rear window open

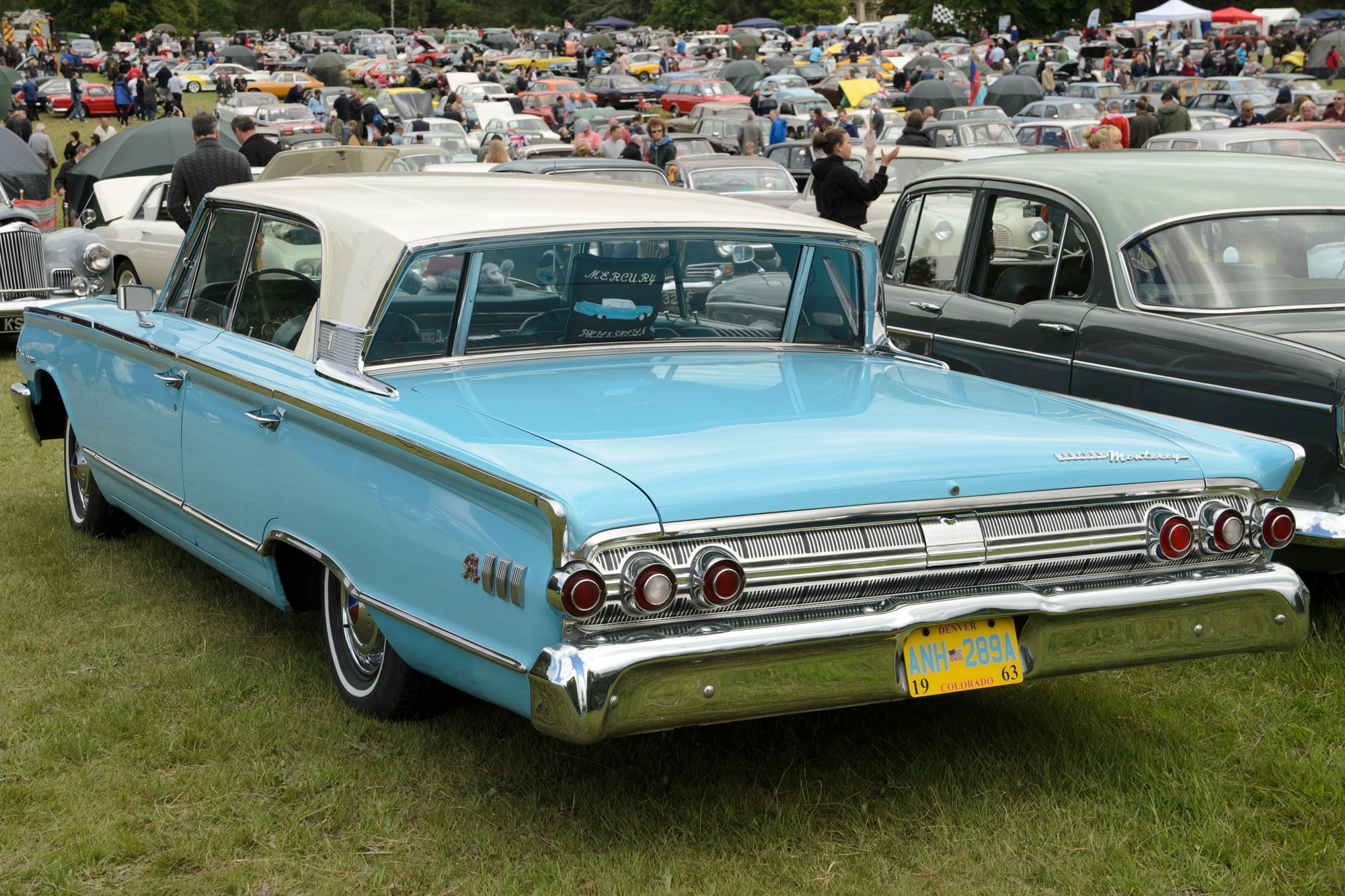
1963 Mercury Monterey S-55 with "Breezeway" rear window

While the Turnpike Cruiser was produced for two years, elements of its design were adopted across other Lincoln-Mercury vehicles. For 1958, Lincoln introduced the Continental Mark III; to distinguish it from the standard Lincoln, the Mark III was fitted with a retractable rear window on all body styles (including convertibles) borrowed from Mercury station wagons. While using a similar roofline as the Turnpike Cruiser, Continental used a reverse-slant rear window.

For 1959, following the discontinuation of the Turnpike Cruiser, Mercury designated its hardtop roofline as a Hardtop Cruiser, on all non-convertible Park Lanes. A compound-curved rear window was introduced, creating a notchback roofline, adopted by the 1960s Mercury Marauder and Mercury S-55.

Following the 1960 Continental Mark V, Lincoln discontinued the retractable rear window. For 1963, the design feature was revived by Mercury, making a reverse-slant retractable rear window standard on its full-size sedans (including the Monterey, Montclair, S-55, and Park Lane). In 1965, the roofline became an option and was discontinued after 1966.

For 2001, the Ford Explorer Sport Trac mid-size pickup truck adopted a retractable vertical rear window between the cab and cargo area. It was vertical in design, in line with the previous Mercury and Lincoln designs.
