= Sokolovsky, Volgograd Oblast =

Sokolovsky Соколовский
- Khutor
- Location within Volgograd Oblast Location within Russia
- Coordinates: 50°23′N 41°50′E
- Country: Russia
- Region: Volgograd Oblast
- District: Nekhayevsky District
- Time zone: UTC+4:00

Sokolovsky (Russian: Соколовский) is a rural locality (a khutor) in Tishanskoye Rural Settlement, Nekhayevsky District, Volgograd Oblast, Russia. The population was 143 as of 2010. There are 7 streets.

== Geography ==
Sokolovsky is located on the bank of the Tishanka River, 9 km southeast of Nekhayevskaya (the district's administrative centre) by road. Mazinsky is the nearest rural locality.
