= Michael Sokolowski =

Canadian sprinter

Personal information
- Nationality: Canadian
- Born: 24 February 1962 (age 64) Katowice, Poland

Sport
- Sport: Track and Field
- Events: 400m, 4×400m relay
- College team: Springfield College
- Club: Scarborough Optimist Track and Field Club

Michael Sokolowski (born 24 February 1962) is a retired Canadian sprinter. He was a member of Canada's 4 × 400 metres relay at the 1984 Summer Olympics, which placed 8th. Alongside nearly every sprinter at the Scarborough Optimist Track and Field Club, Mike admitted to using performance-enhancing drugs at the Dubin Inquiry in 1989 and subsequently had his funding suspended.

He is the older brother of fellow Olympian John Sokolowski.
