= Spare tire =

Additional tire carried in a motor vehicle as a replacement for one that fails

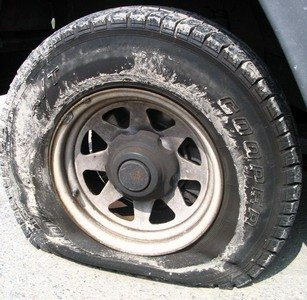
A spare tire allows a driver to replace a flat tire and drive on

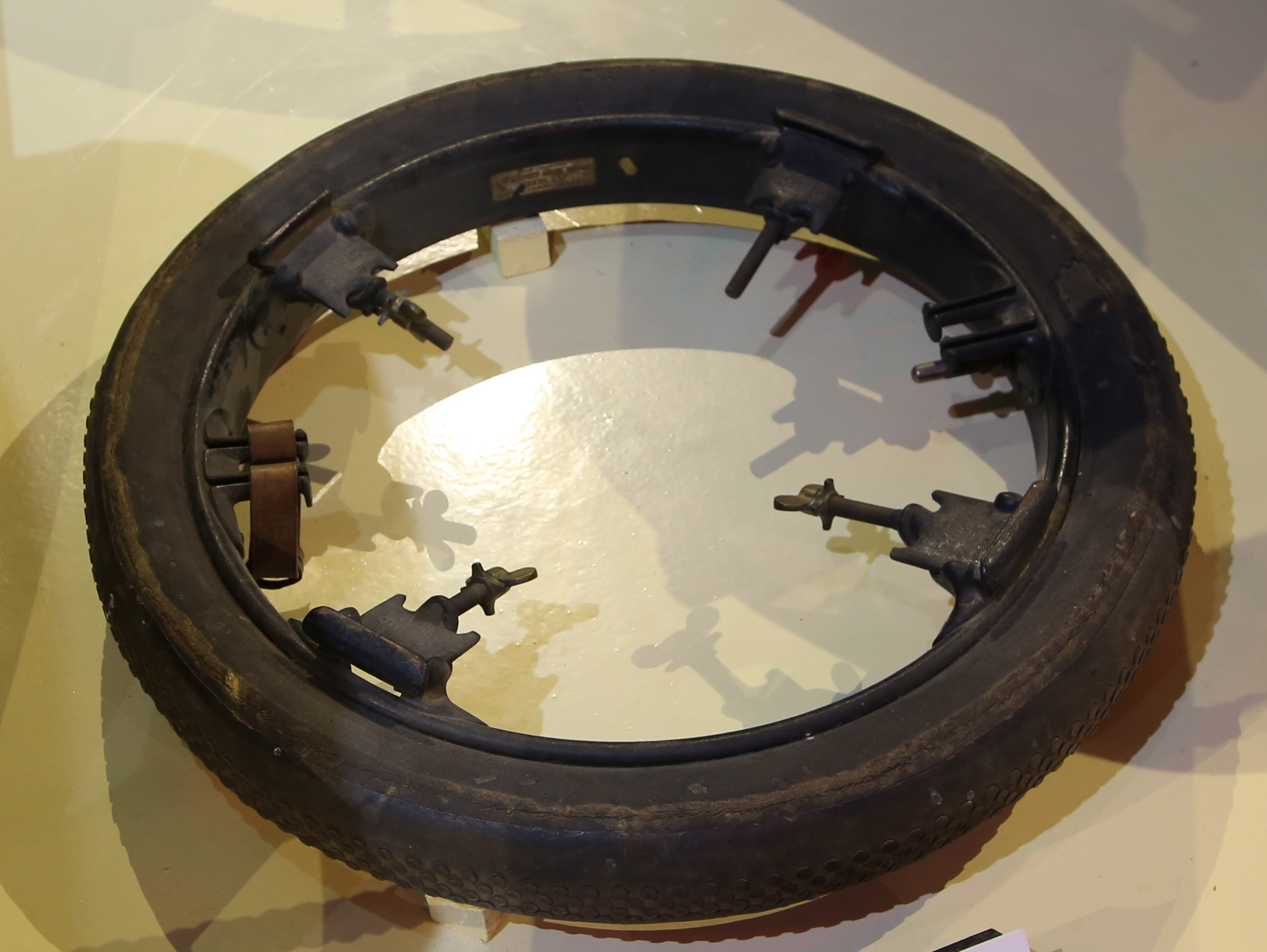
A Stepney rim. An early approach to providing a car with a spare tire

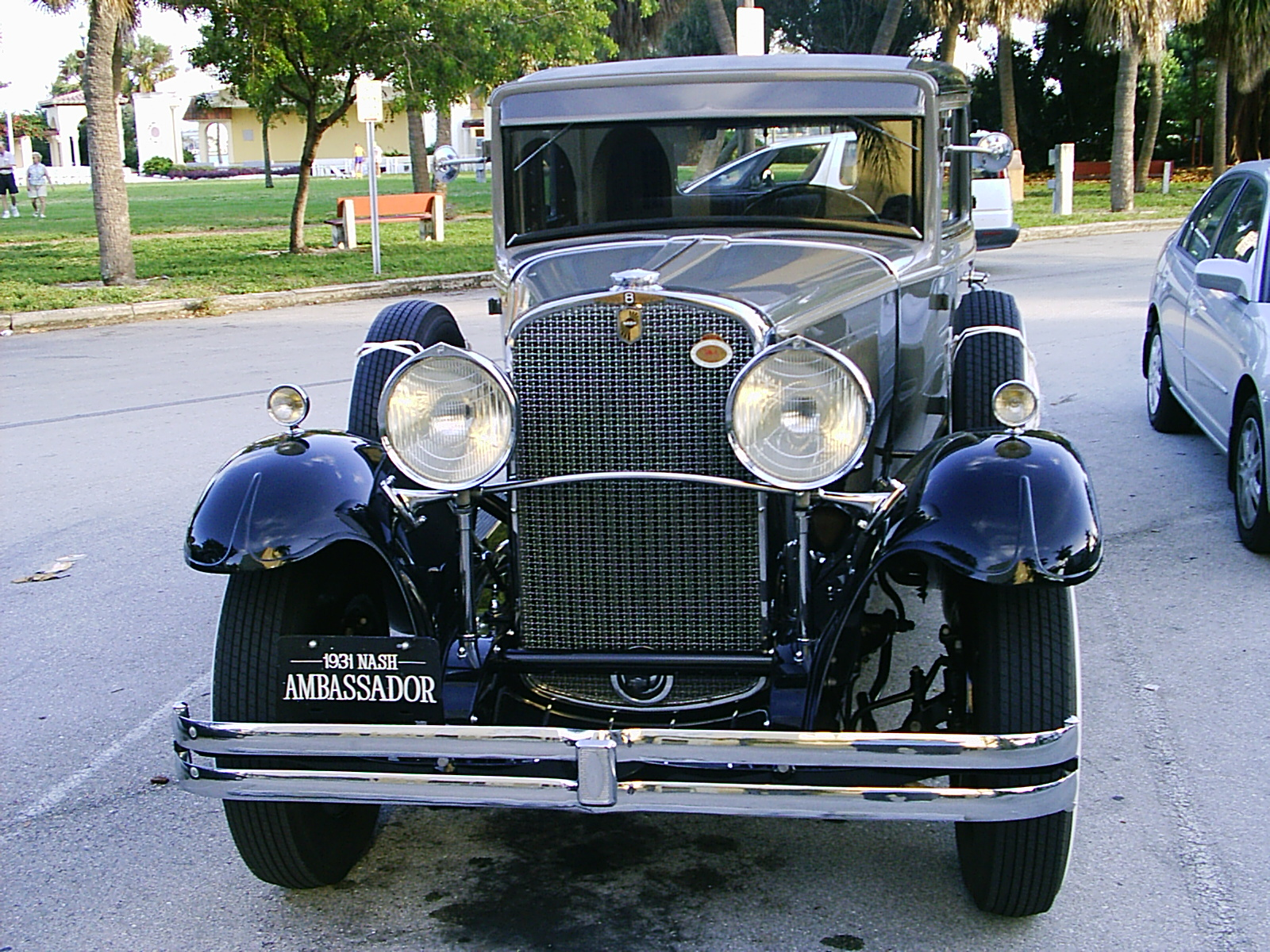
Dual sidemounted spare tires behind the front fenders on a 1931 Nash Ambassador

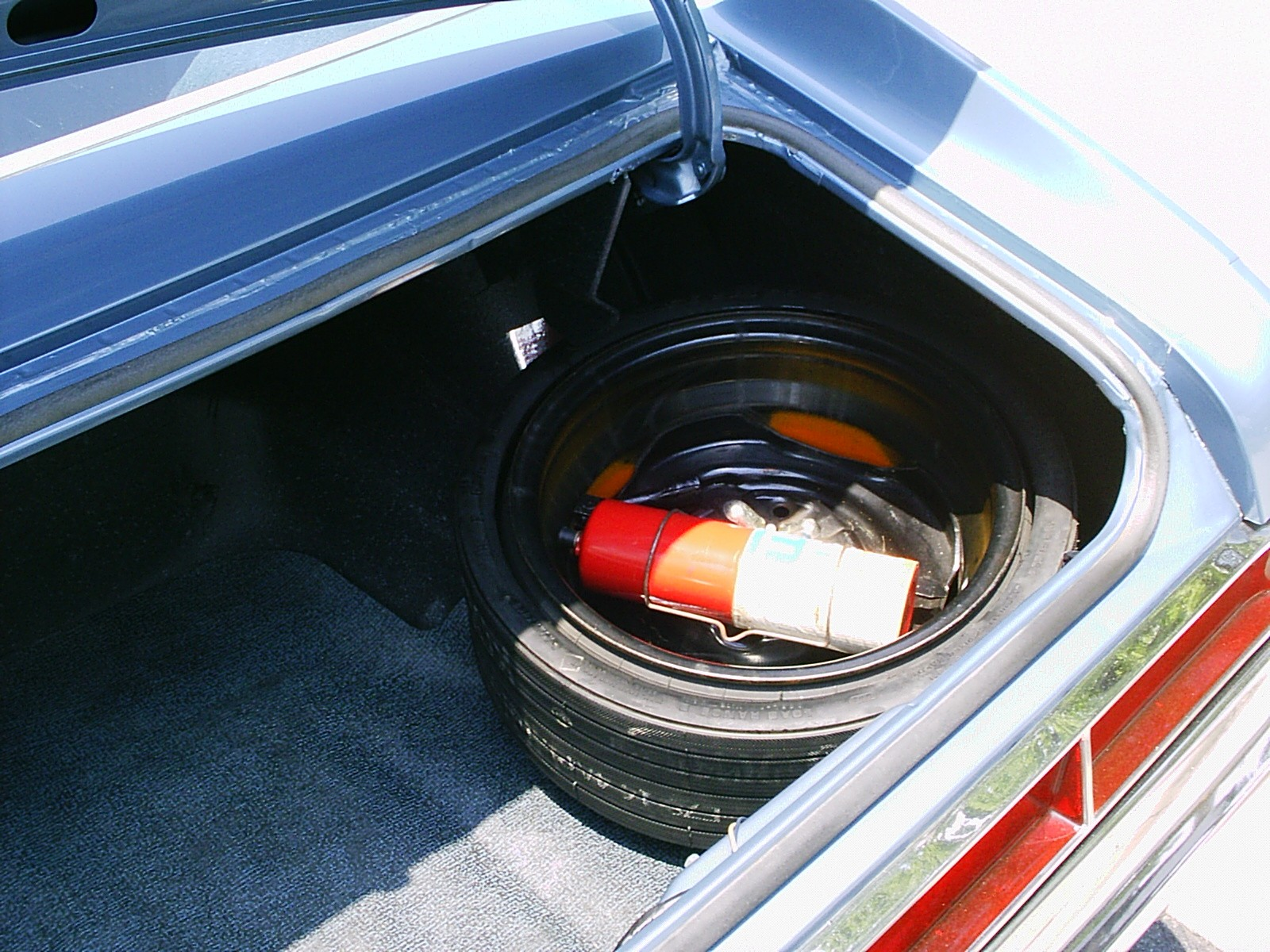
Temporary use "space-saver" spare tire mounted in the trunk of a 1970 AMC AMX with a single use air canister

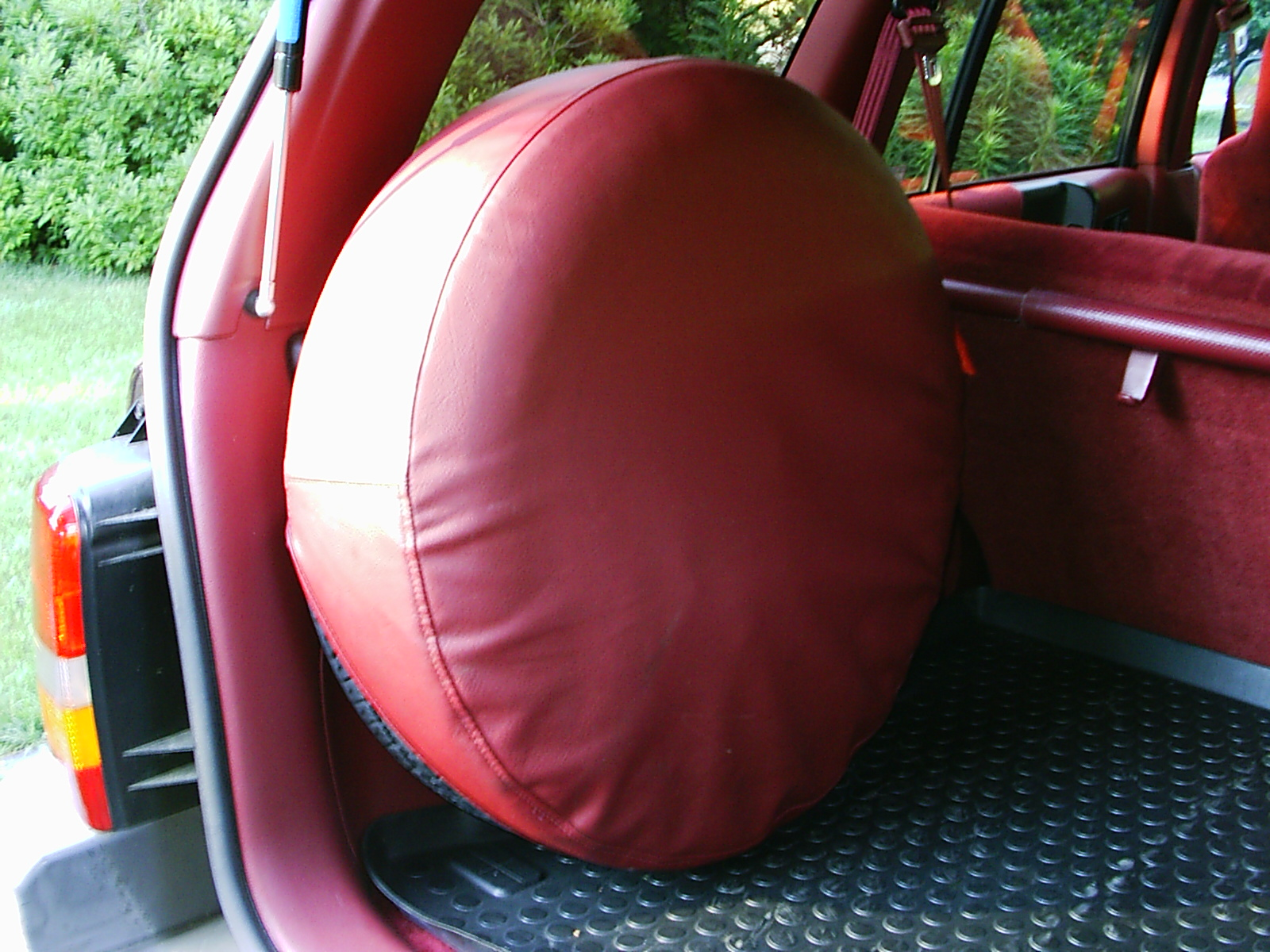
Full size spare tire mounted in cargo space area of a 1993 Jeep Grand Cherokee

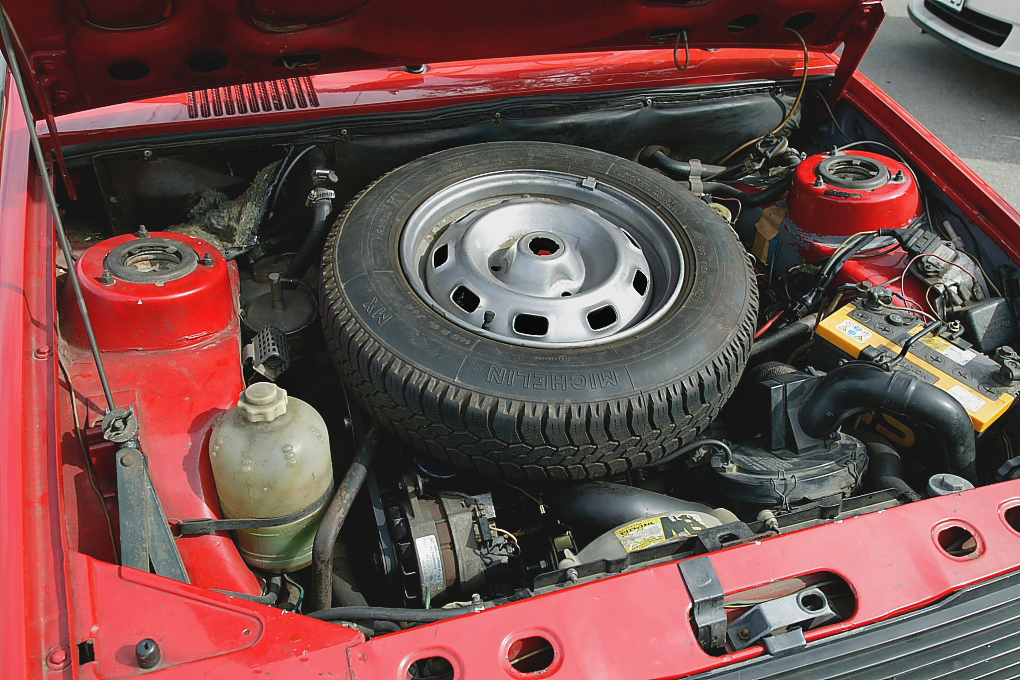
Full size spare tire stowed in the engine bay of a Renault 14

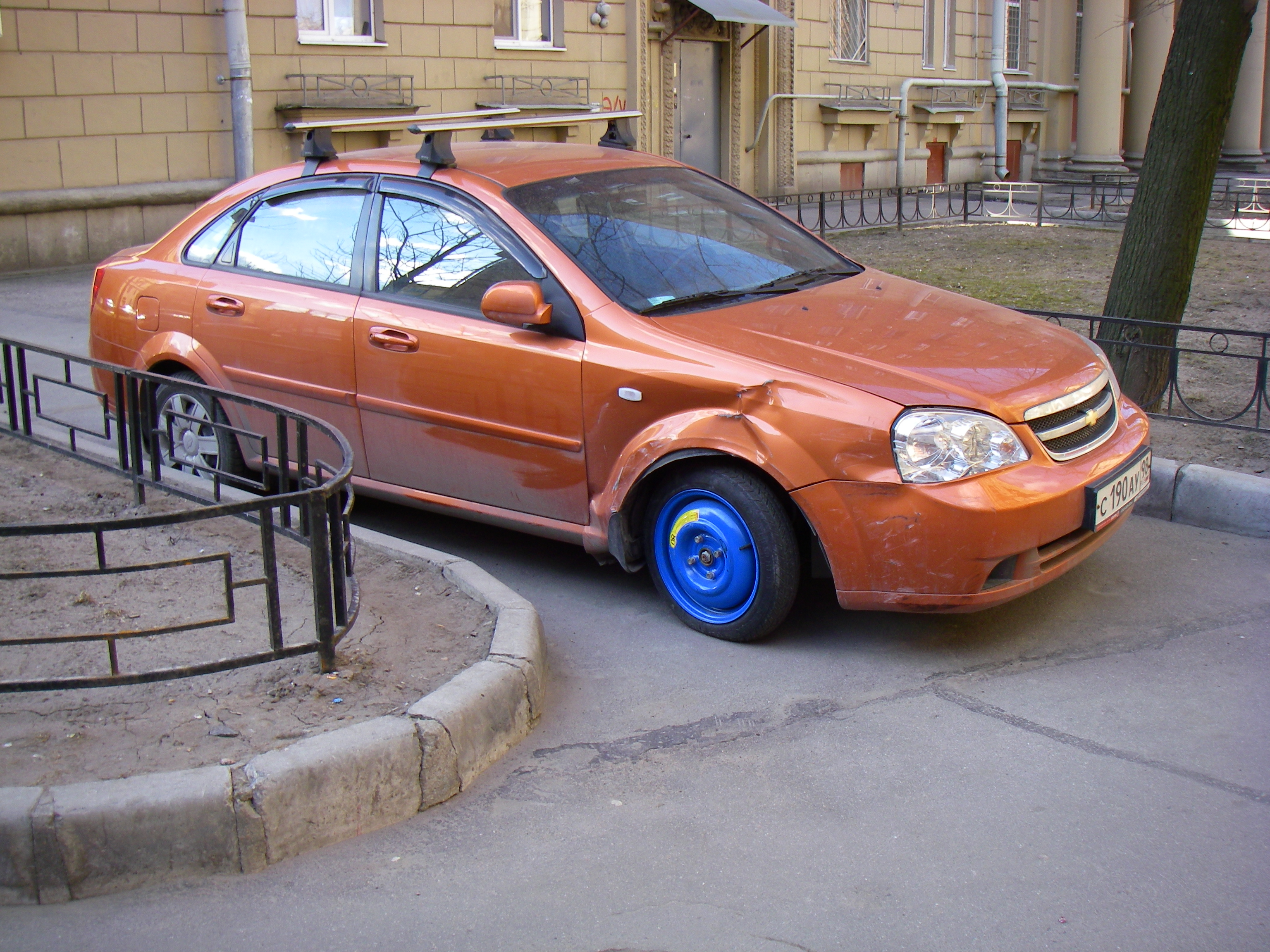
"Donut" type tire on a Chevrolet Lacetti

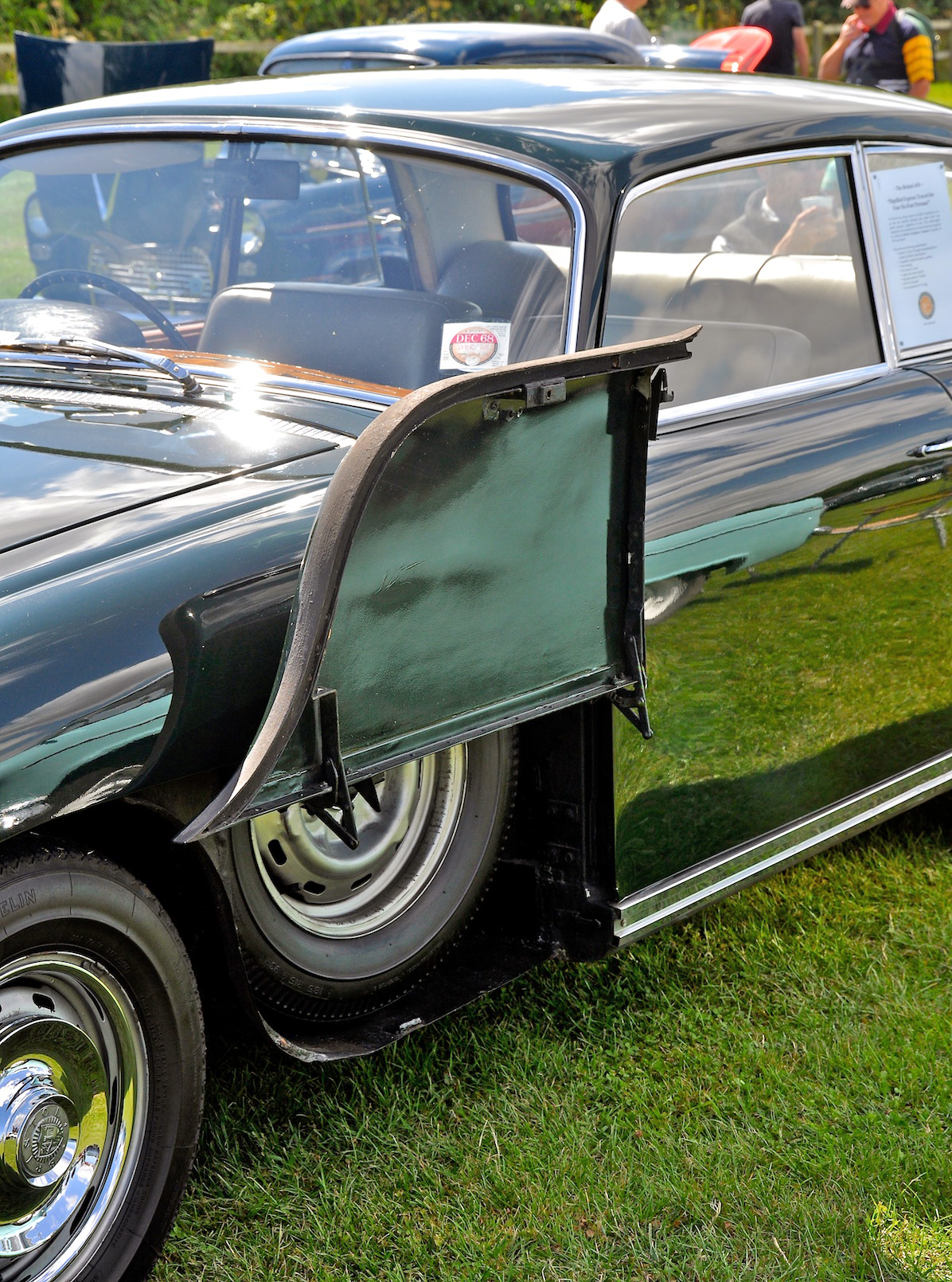
Bristol's traditional wing-mounted spare wheel on a Bristol 410

A spare tire (or stepney in some countries) is an additional tire (or tyre; see spelling differences) carried in a motor vehicle as a replacement for one that goes flat, has a blowout, or has another emergency. Spare tire is generally a misnomer, as almost all vehicles actually carry an entire wheel with a tire mounted on it as a spare rather than just a tire, as fitting a tire to a wheel would require a motorist to carry additional, specialized equipment. However, some spare tires ("space-saver" and "donut" types) are not meant to be driven long distances. Space-savers have a maximum speed of around 50 mph (80 km/h).

When replacing a damaged tire, placing the compact spare on a non-drive axle will prevent damage to the drivetrain. If placed on a drivetrain axle, the smaller-diameter tire can put stress on the differential causing damage and reducing handling.

== History ==
The early days of motor travel took place on primitive roads that were littered with stray horseshoe nails. Punctures (flat tires) were common, and required the motorist to remove the wheel from the car, demount the tire, patch the inner tube, re-mount the tire, inflate the tire, and re-mount the wheel.

To alleviate this time-consuming process, Walter and Tom Davies of Llanelli, Wales, invented the spare tire in 1904. At the time, motor cars were made without spare wheels. The wheel was so successful that the brothers started their own company, Stepney Spare Motor Wheel Limited, (named after the location of their workshop on Stepney Street In Llanelli) and started marketing the wheel in Britain, Europe, and the British Empire and colonies. The word "stepney" is sometimes used interchangeably in countries that were once part of the British Empire such as Pakistan, Bangladesh, India, and Malta.

The first to equip cars with an inflated spare wheel-and-tire assembly were the Ramblers made by Thomas B. Jeffery Company. The Rambler's interchangeable wheel with a mounted and inflated spare tire meant the motorist could exchange it quickly for the punctured tire that could then be repaired at a more convenient time and place.

The pre-mounted spare tire and wheel combination proved so popular with motorists that carrying up to two spare tires became common. Automakers often equipped cars with one or dual sidemounts. The spares were mounted behind the front fenders as they blended into the running boards (a narrow footboard serving as a step beneath the doors).

In 1941, the U.S. government temporarily prohibited spare tires on new cars as part of the nation's World War II rationing strategy, which led to quotas and laws designed to force conservation, including rubber that was produced overseas and difficult to get. A similar ration prohibition was also implemented by the U.S. during the Korean War in 1951.

== Usage in the 21st century ==
Contemporary vehicles may come equipped with full-size spares, limited use minispares, or have run-flat capability.

- The spare tire may be identical type and size to those on the vehicle. The spare may either be mounted on a plain steel rim or a matching road wheel as found on the vehicle. Among passenger vehicles, full-sized spares are usually provided for sport utility vehicles and light trucks, since a "limited use" spare would adversely affect such vehicles with higher centers of gravity. Additionally, a "limited use" spare may not be safe on a fully loaded truck or one that is towing a trailer. Due to the size of the full-sized spare, it is often mounted on the outside, such as the rear door of SUVs, and occasionally on the front hood.
- Many vehicles are provided with a "limited use" spare tire, also known as a "space-saver", temporary spare, "donut", or "compact" spare tire — in an attempt to reduce cost, lower the vehicle's weight, or conserve the space that would be needed for a full-size spare tire. Introduced in the late 1970s, as of 2017, temporary spares come standard on 53 percent of 2017 models in the U.S. A space-saver is typically 7 kg (15 lb) lighter than a full-sized wheel and in some cars the so-called 'space-saver' may actually save little to no space. There is also the difficulty of transporting the full-sized wheel and tire once the space-saver has been fitted. The spare is usually mounted on a plain steel rim.

They are typically smaller than the normal tires on the vehicle and can only be used for limited distances because of their short life expectancy and low speed rating. As well, due to the different size of a donut compared to regular wheel, electronic stability control and traction control systems will not operate properly and should be disabled until the original wheel is restored. Space saver spare tires could potentially compromise the braking (especially on cars not fitted with anti-lock brakes) and handling of the car.

- In some cases, automobiles may be equipped with run-flat tires and thus not require a separate spare tire. Other vehicles may carry a can of tire repair foam, to repair punctured tires, although these often do not work in the case of larger punctures, and are useless in the event of a blow-out.
- Newer vehicles often do not come with a spare tire at all. The reduction of a spare tire increases fuel economy, reduces cost of vehicle, as well as reducing production waste.

== Storage ==
Spare tires in automobiles are often stored in a spare tire well – a recessed area in the trunk of a vehicle, usually in the center, where the spare tire is stored while not in use. In most cars, the spare tire is secured with a bolt and wing-nut style fastener. Usually a stiff sheet of cardboard lies on top of the spare tire well with the trunk carpet on top of it to hide the spare tire and provide a pleasant look to and a flat surface for the trunk space.

Other storage locations include a cradle underneath the rear of the vehicle. This cradle is usually secured by a bolt that is accessible from inside the trunk, for security. This arrangement has advantages over storing the tire inside the trunk, including not having to empty the contents of the trunk to access the wheel and this arrangement may also save space in some applications. However it has disadvantages because that tire gets dirty, making the act of changing the tire more unpleasant and the mechanism may also rust on older cars, making it difficult to free the spare. The cradle arrangement is usually only practical on front wheel drive cars, as the cradle would get in the way of the rear axle on most rear or four wheel drive cars. A similar arrangement is also often found on trucks where the spare is often stored beneath the truck bed.

Many sport utility vehicles (SUVs) and off-road vehicles have the spare wheel mounted externally – usually on the rear door, but others may mount them on the roof, the side, or even on the bonnet (hood).

In mid-engined and rear-engined cars, the spare tire is generally stored in the front boot.

Some vehicles stored the spare tire in the engine bay, such as the Renault 14, First generation Fiat Panda and older Subaru vehicles, such as the Subaru Leone.

Vehicles like the Volkswagen Beetle used spare tires for ancillary purposes such as supplying air pressure to the windscreen washer system.

Many models of Bristol cars - those from the 404 of 1953 to the Fighter of 2004 carried a full-size spare wheel and tire in a pannier compartment built into the left-hand wing. This not only increased luggage space and allowed easy access to the spare without having to unload the trunk but improved weight distribution by keeping as much mass as possible within the wheelbase and balancing the weight of the battery, mounted in a similar compartment in the right-hand wing.

== See also ==
- Spare wheel cover
- Continental tire
- Whitewall tire
