= Spare wheel cover =

A spare wheel cover or spare tire cover is an accessory that covers the spare wheel mounted on external part of a car or van. On 4x4 vehicles, the spare wheel is normally rear mounted and is often printed with a design. Covers can be hard shells or soft vinyl covers. Spare wheel covers protect spare tires from dirt and UV rays in areas with high sun exposure. Covers are recommended to be removed and cleaned every once in a while.

== Photo gallery ==
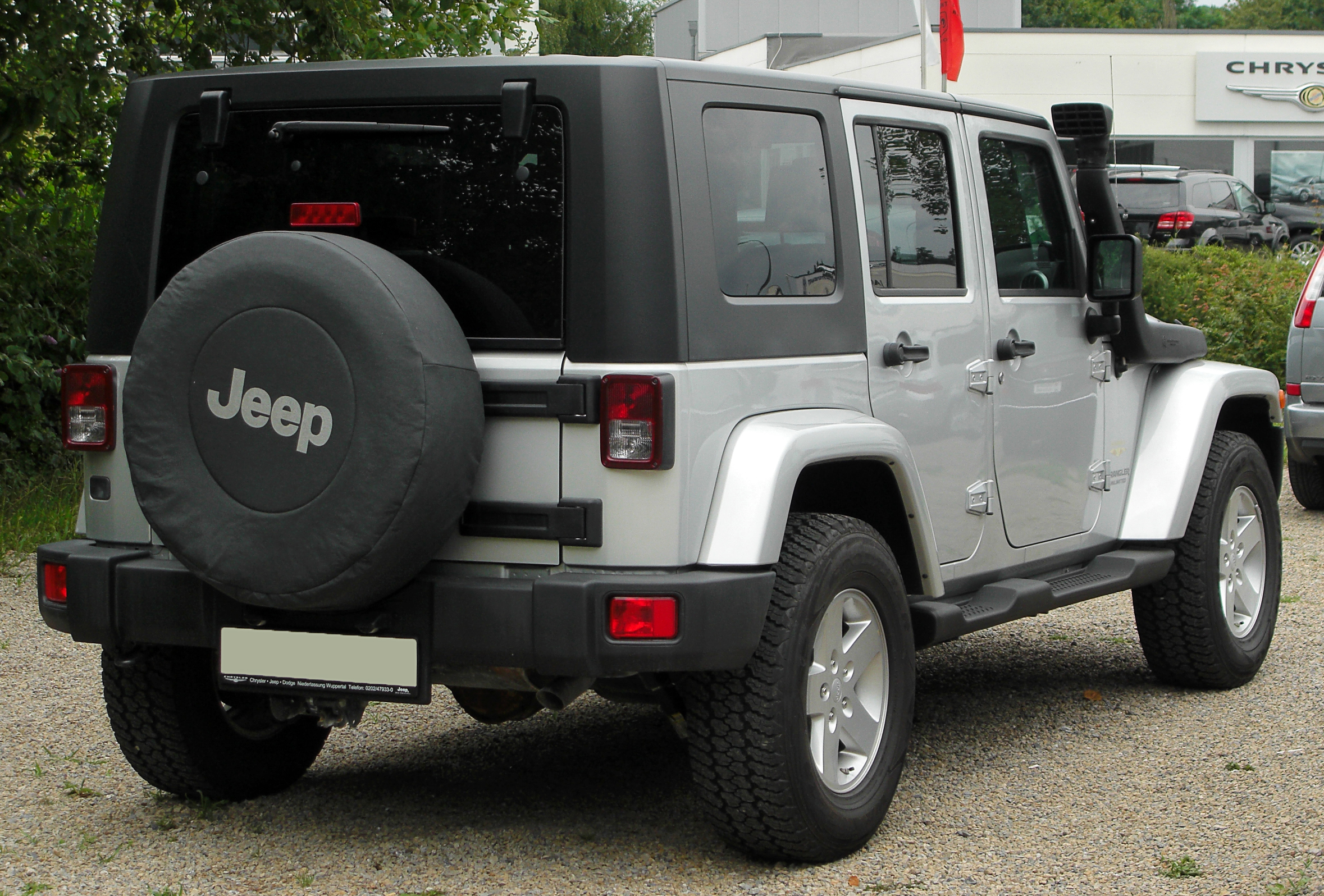
Jeep Wrangler spare wheel cover printed with a dealer's name

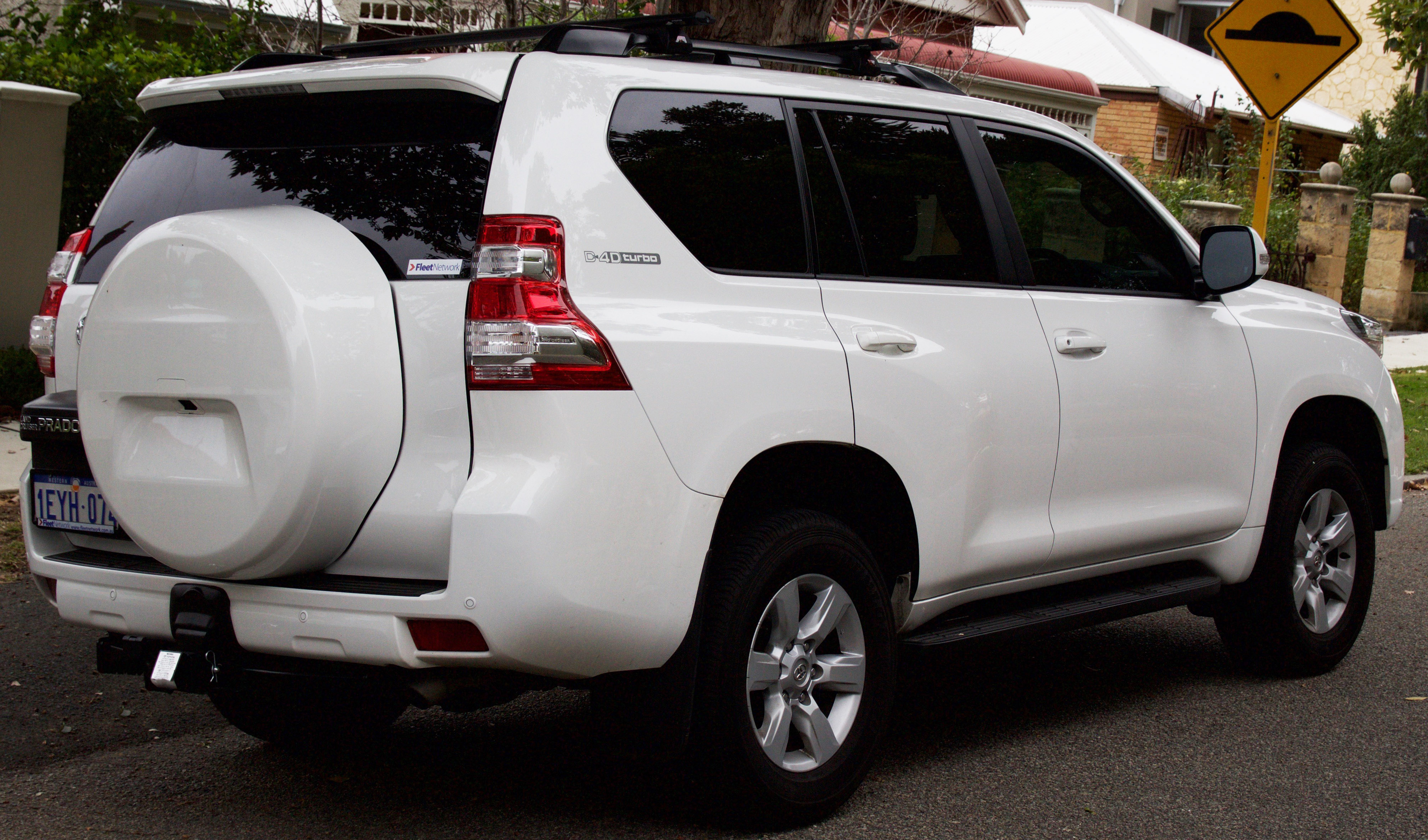
2015 Toyota Land Cruiser Prado with body coloured shell cover

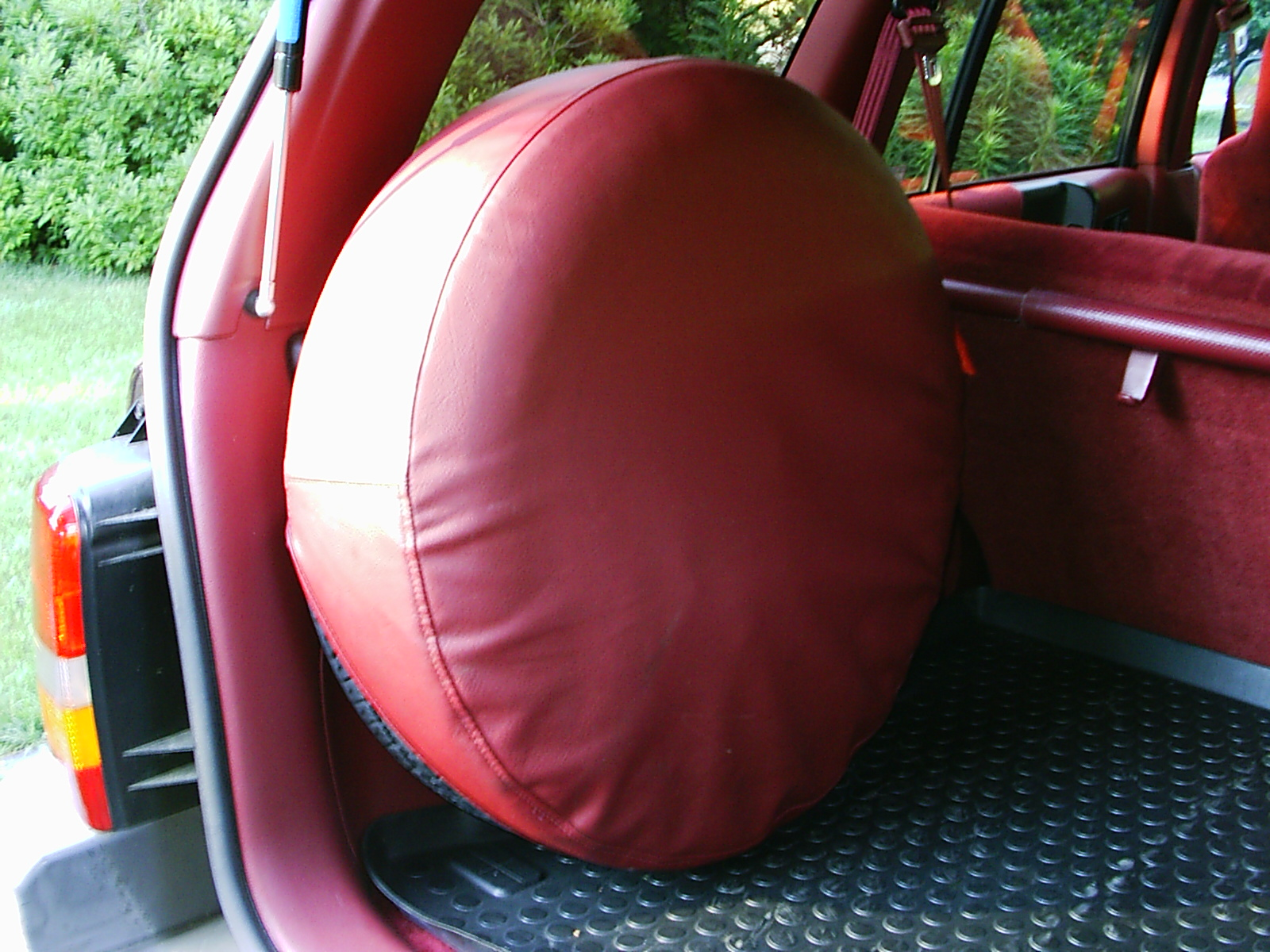
Full size spare tire, with cover, mounted in cargo space area of a 1993 Jeep Grand Cherokee

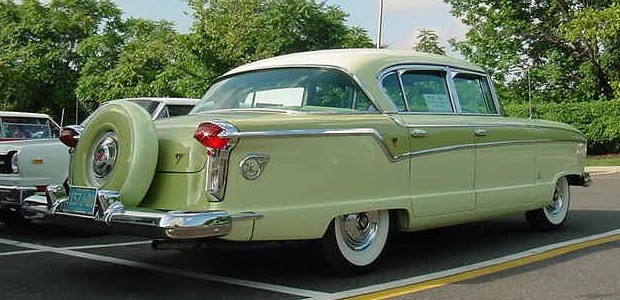
1956 Nash four-door sedan with factory color matched Continental tire with shell cover

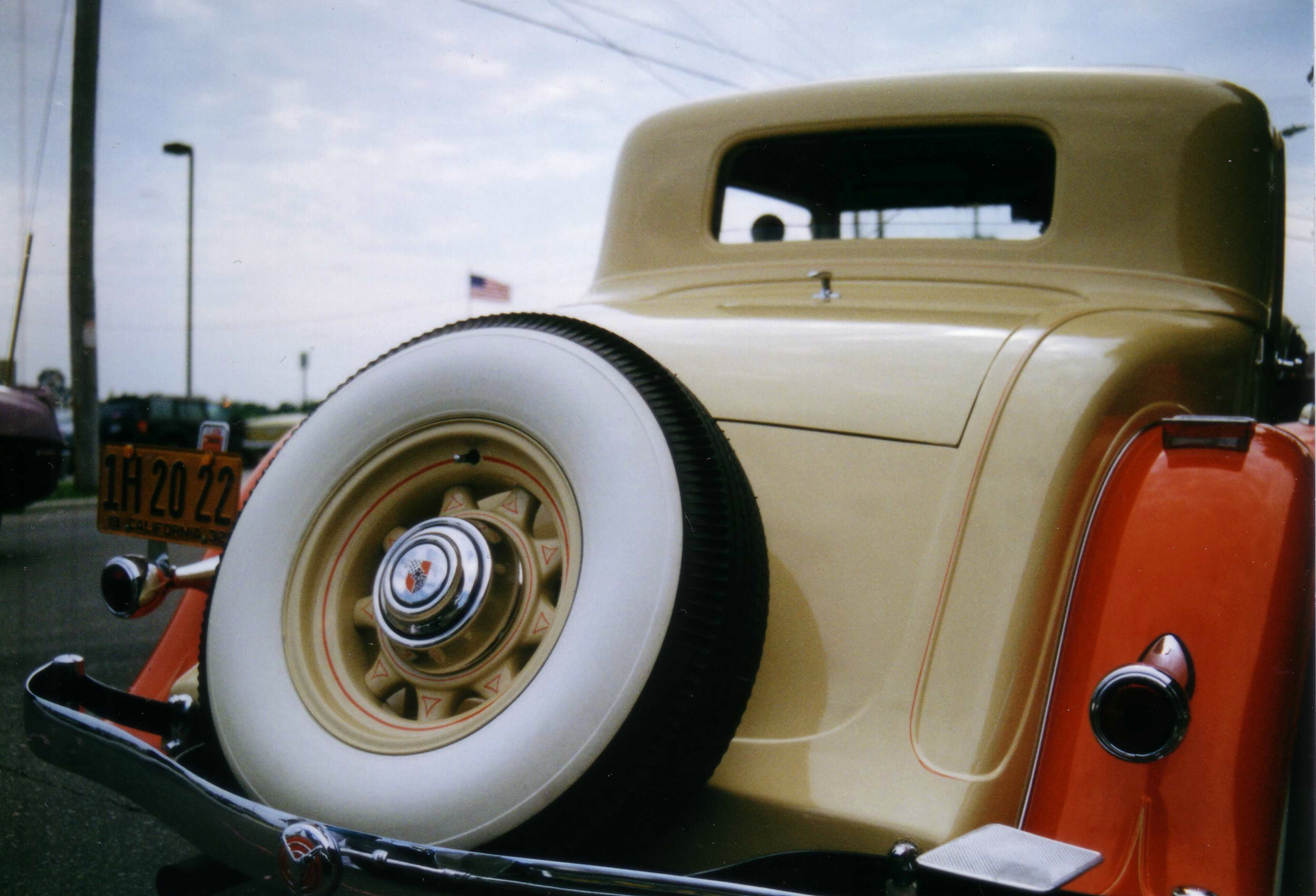
1932 Nash Ambassador Rumble Seat Coupe with matching spare wheel with whitewall tire

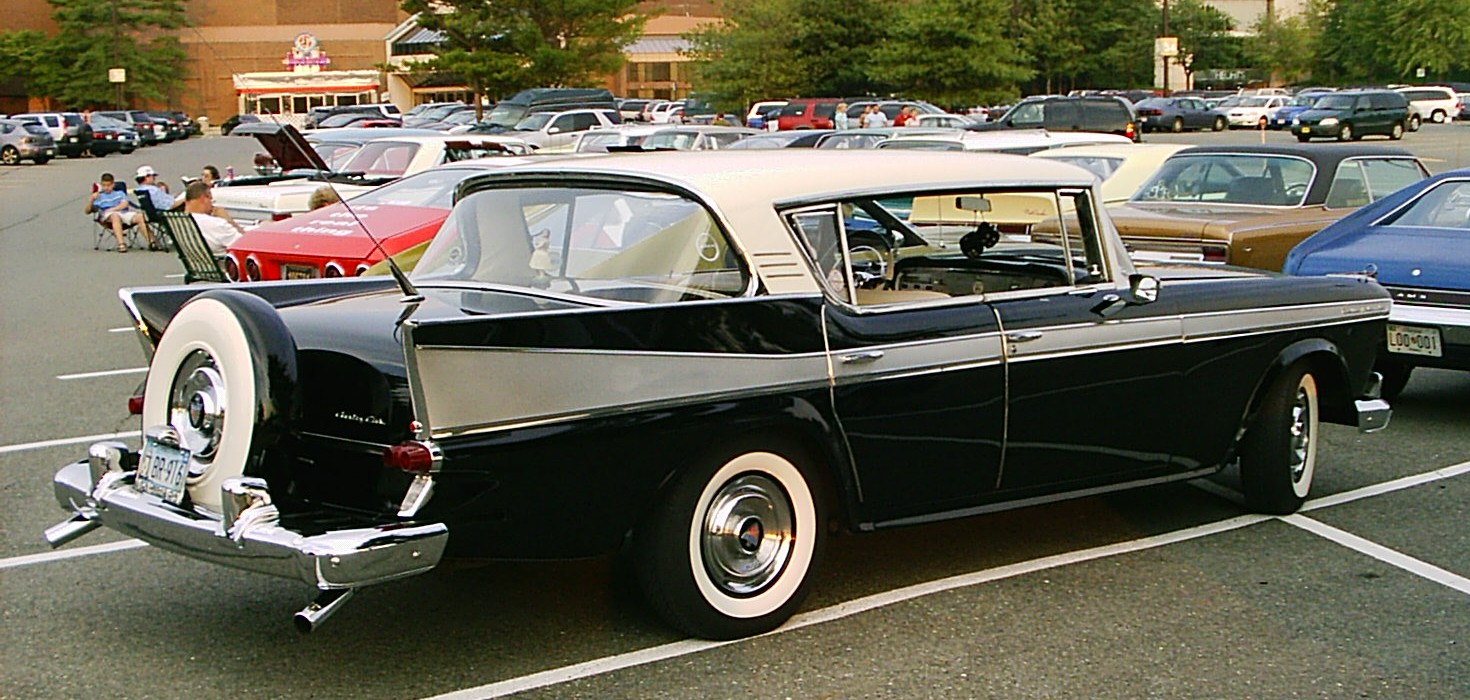
1958 Ambassador by Rambler four-door hardtop with full hub cap within its Continental tire cover

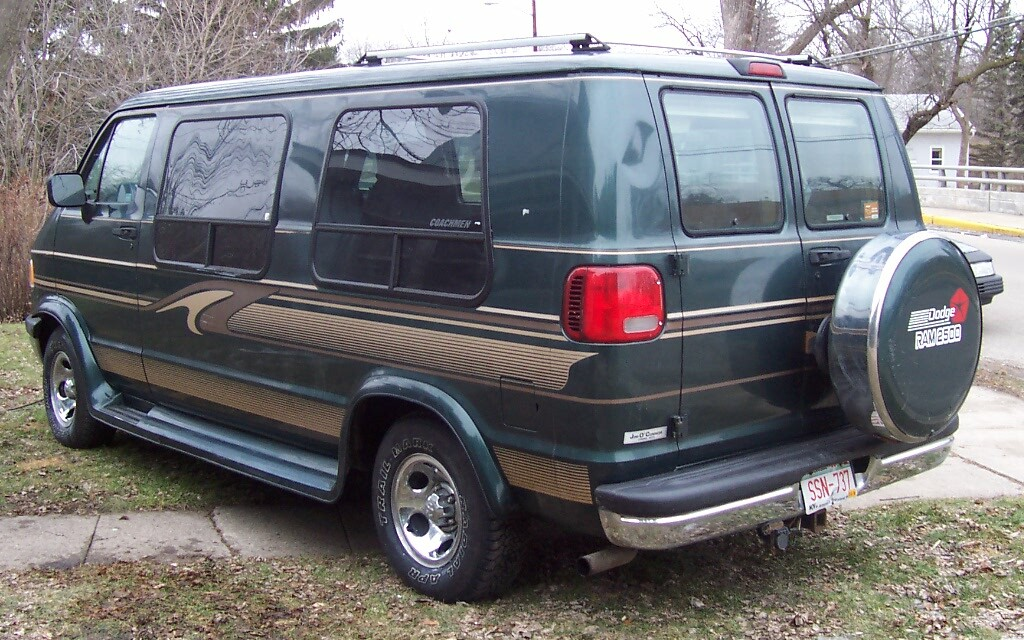
Modern version of an outside rear mounted spare tire on a van or recreational vehicle

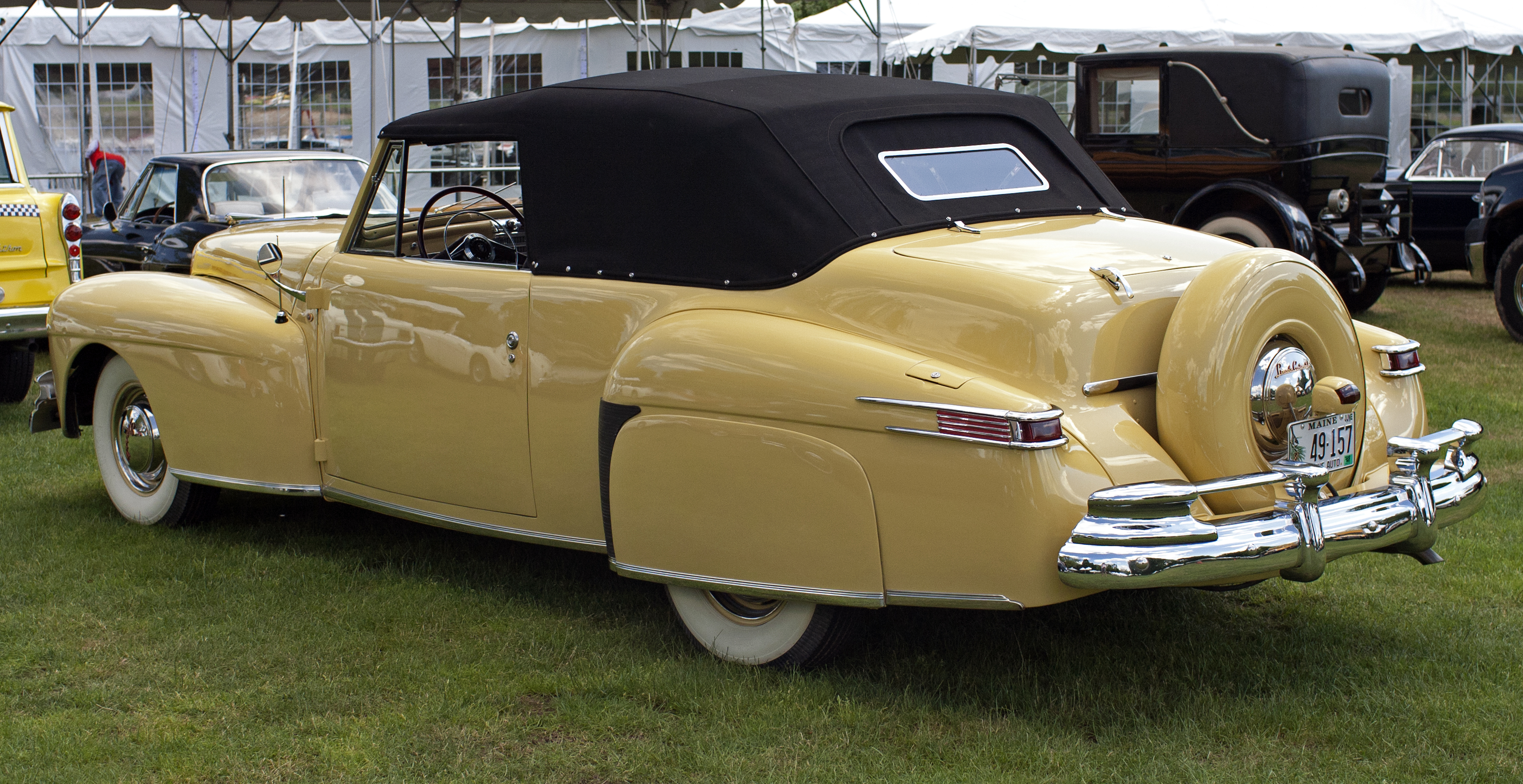
1948 convertible with view of "Continental" spare tire mount

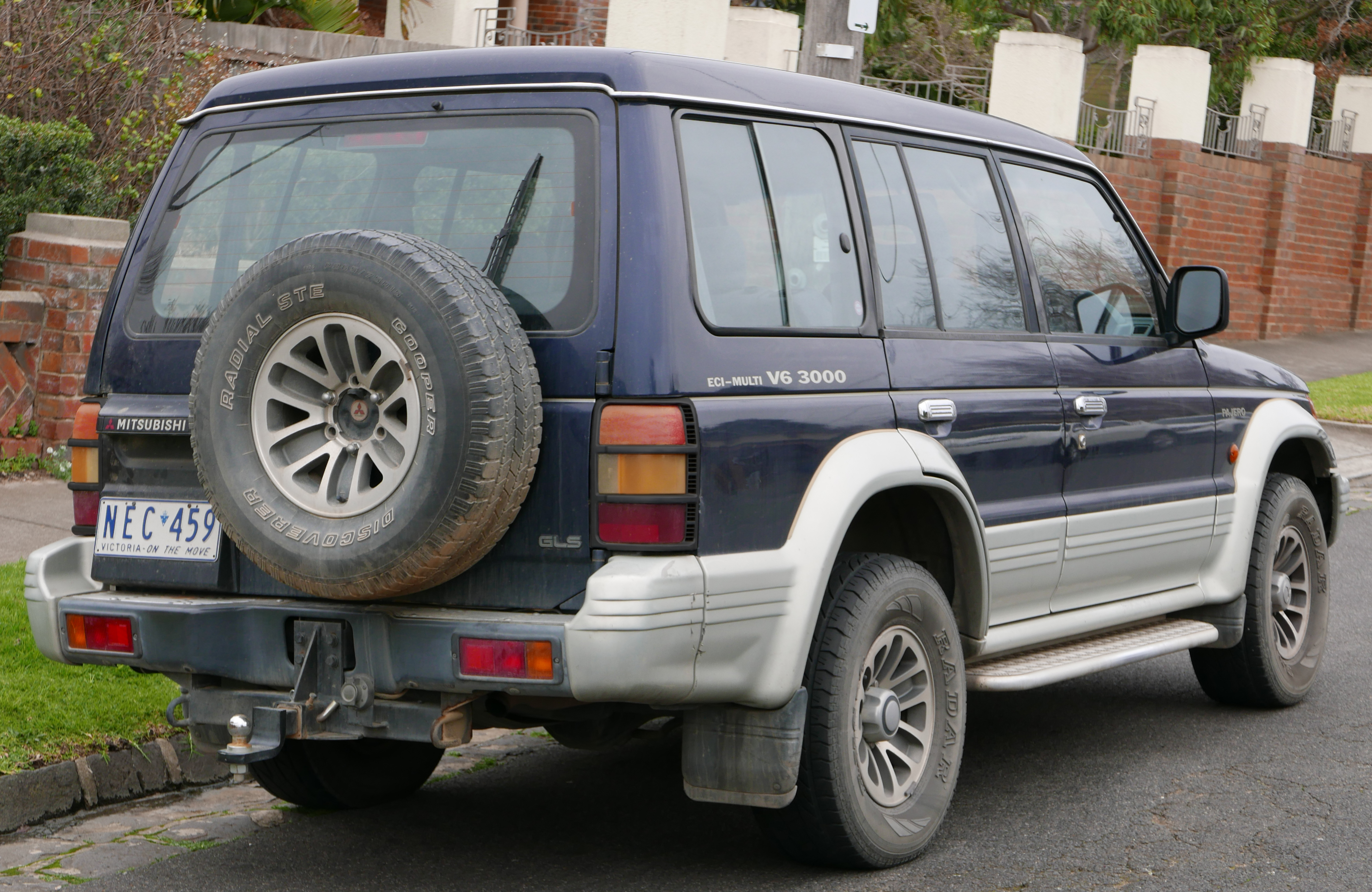
1994 Mitsubishi Pajero GLS missing a cover

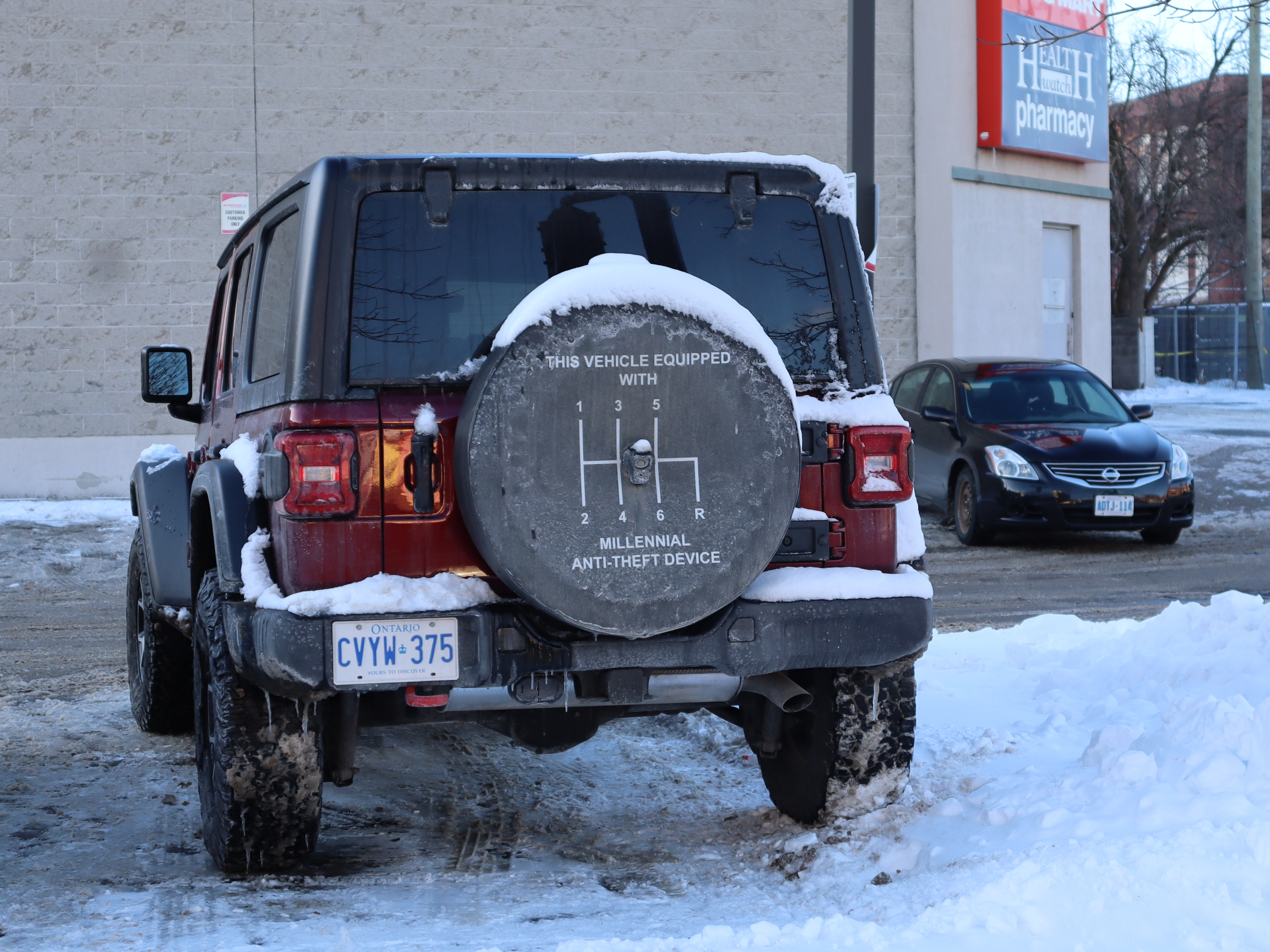
Jeep Wrangler with humorous wheel cover
