= Continental tire =

Externally-mounted spare tire behind an automobile's trunk

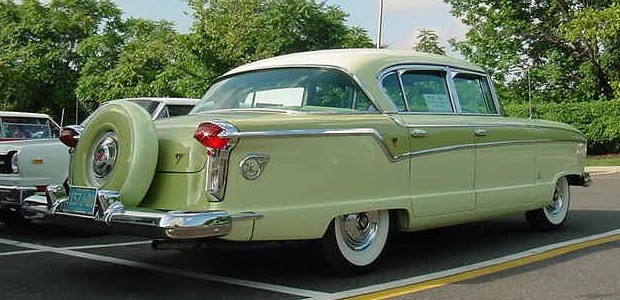
1956 Nash four-door sedan with factory color-matched Continental tire mount

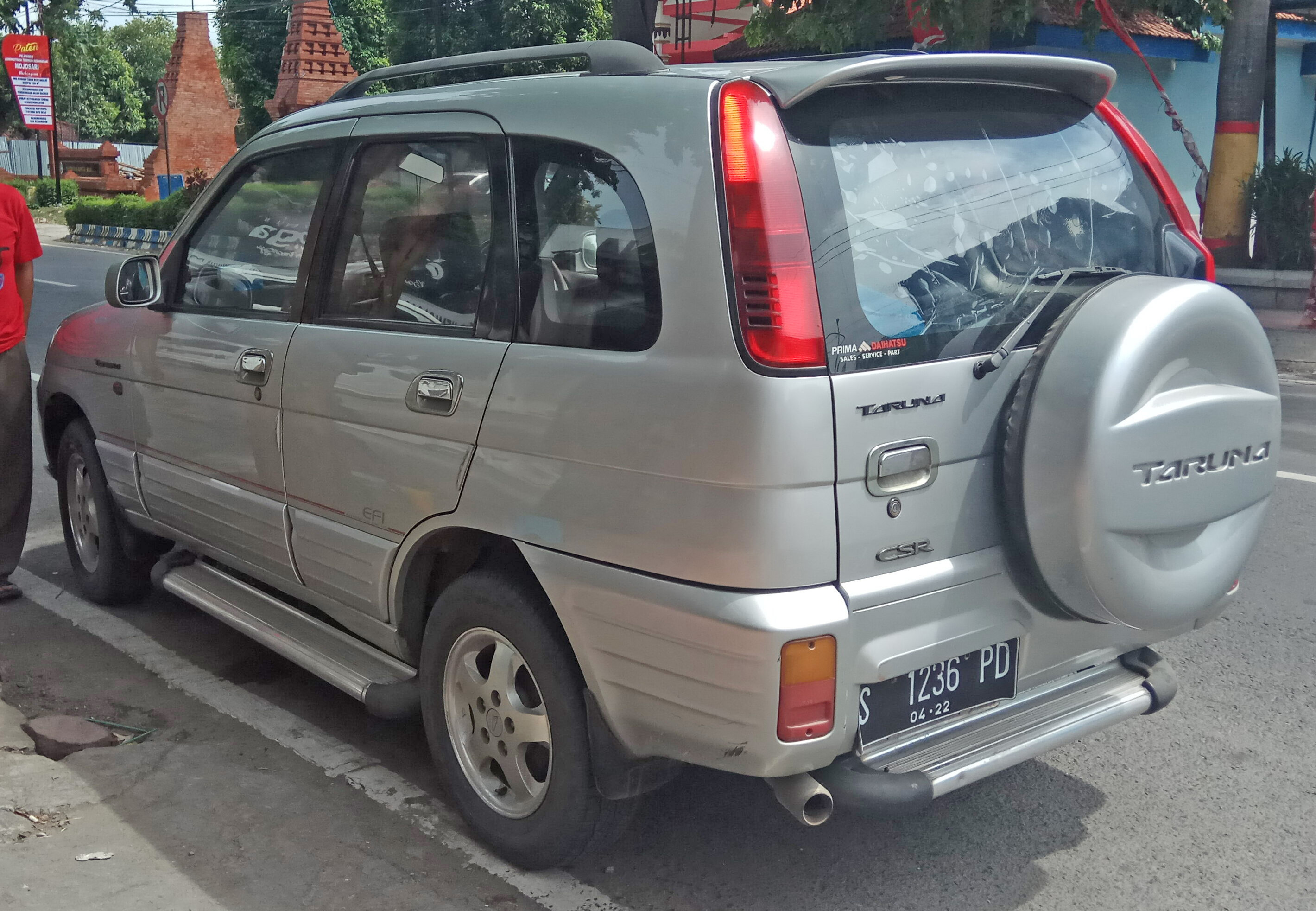
2001 Daihatsu Taruna is a five-door SUV with a sporty tire mount

A continental tire or a continental kit is the common U.S. term for an upright externally-mounted spare tire behind an automobile's trunk.

These were available as factory-installed or aftermarket "kits" with full-sized spare wheels. The term is also applied to a cosmetic accessory designed to give the impression of an exposed rear-mounted spare tire.

The term also describes a tire-like styling bulge stamped into the trunk lid. This non-functional feature appeared on the 1956 Continental Mark II and through successive generations of Mark-series Continentals until the 1998 model year.

== Early spare tire mounts ==
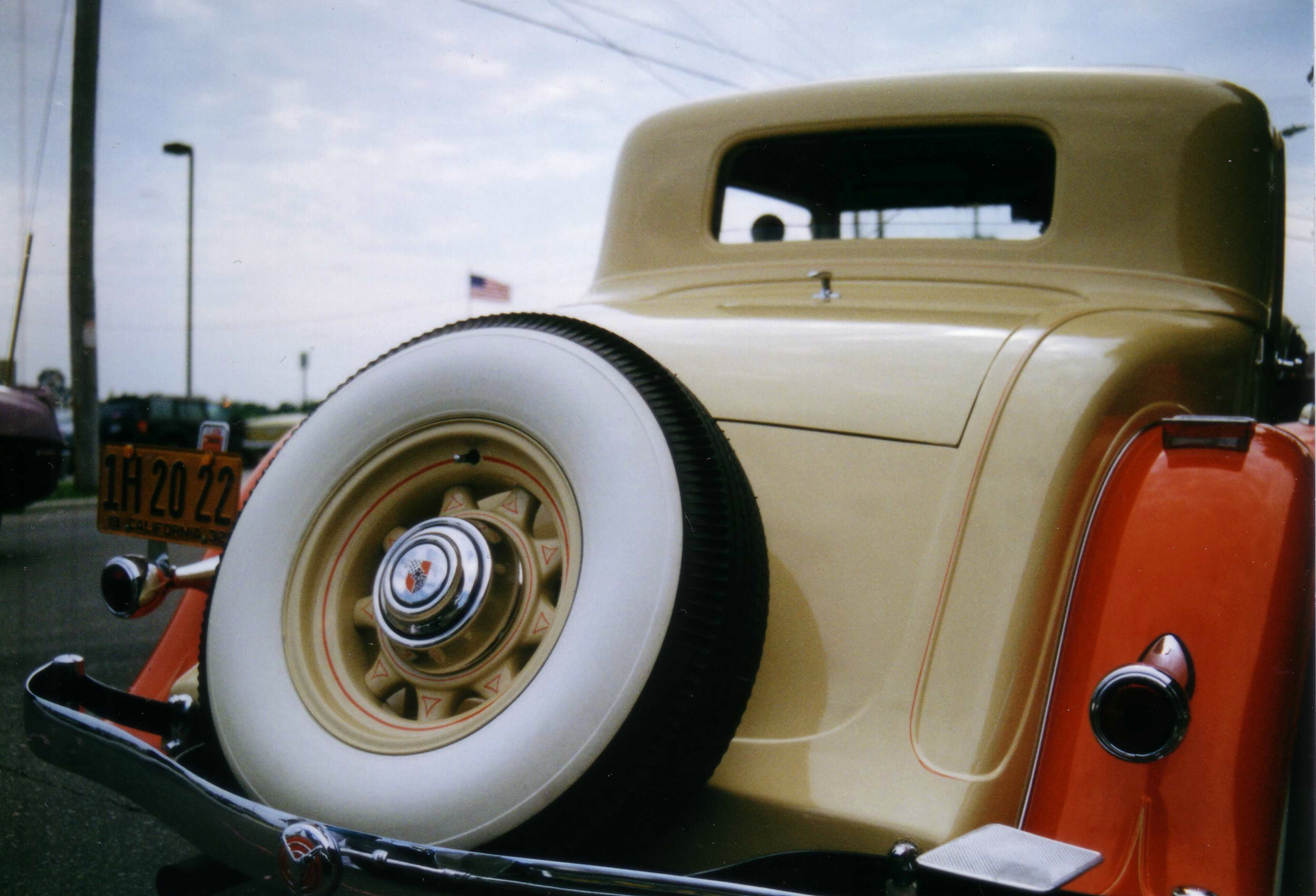
1932 Nash Ambassador Rumble Seat Coupe with a matching spare wheel with whitewall tire

Early automobiles' pre-mounted spare tire and wheel combination typically meant an external mounting because motorists often needed to change tires. Automakers often mounted a spare tire, or two, on the rear of the car.

Some cars featured a standard (or optional) side-mounted spare tire (or tires) on the fenders behind the front wheels, either for style or to increase luggage capacity.

Early European sports cars had their spare tire attached to the back of the automobile, since their trunk or storage space was often minimal. However, these rear- or side-mounted spare tires were not considered continental tires.

The development of the enclosed trunk on automobiles meant the spare tire could be placed inside rather than on the top of it. This arrangement used up valuable space for carrying luggage. Manufacturers offered the sidemount option to increase trunk capacity.

== The continental tire mount ==
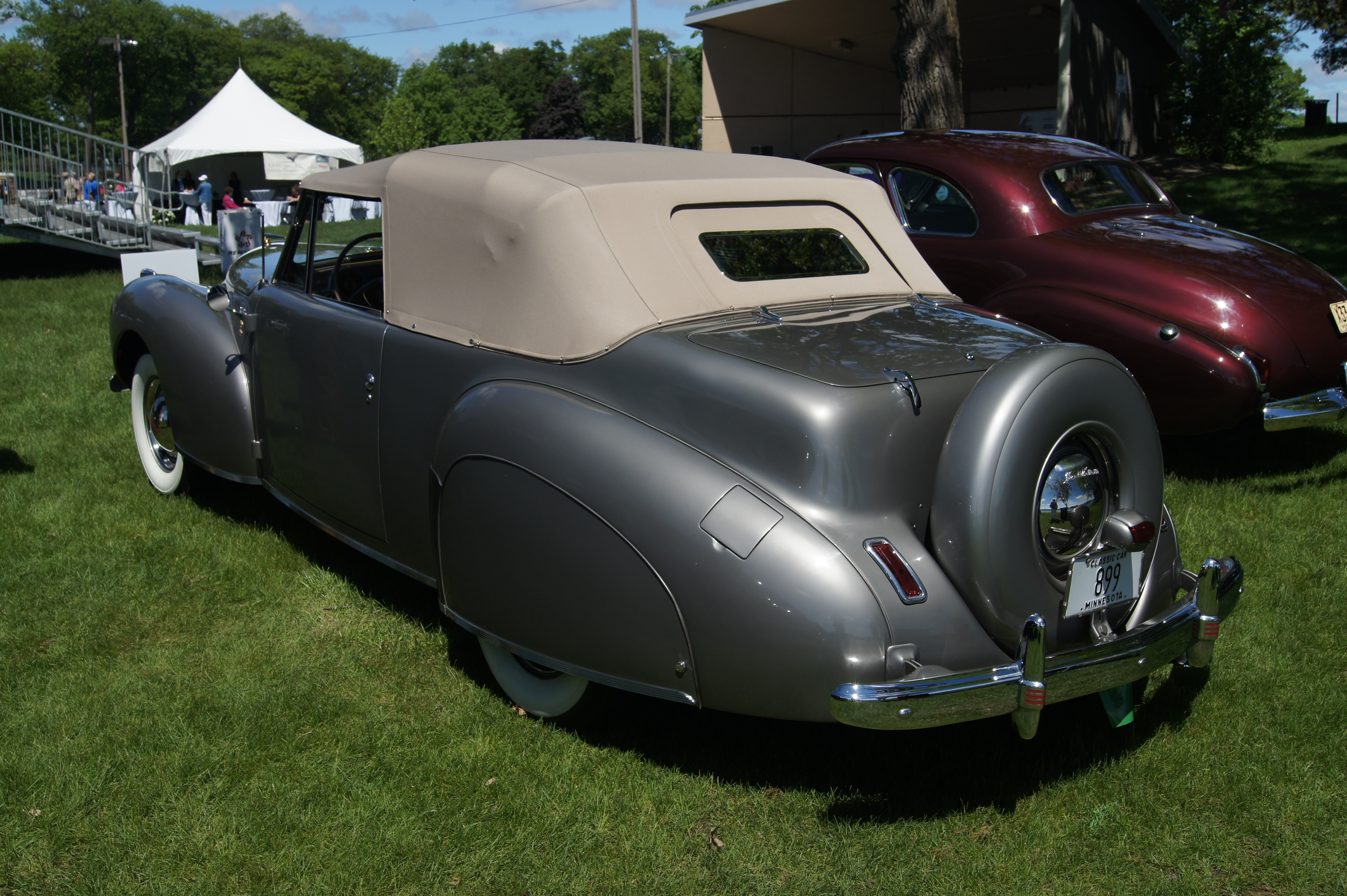
1941 Lincoln Continental with factory mount

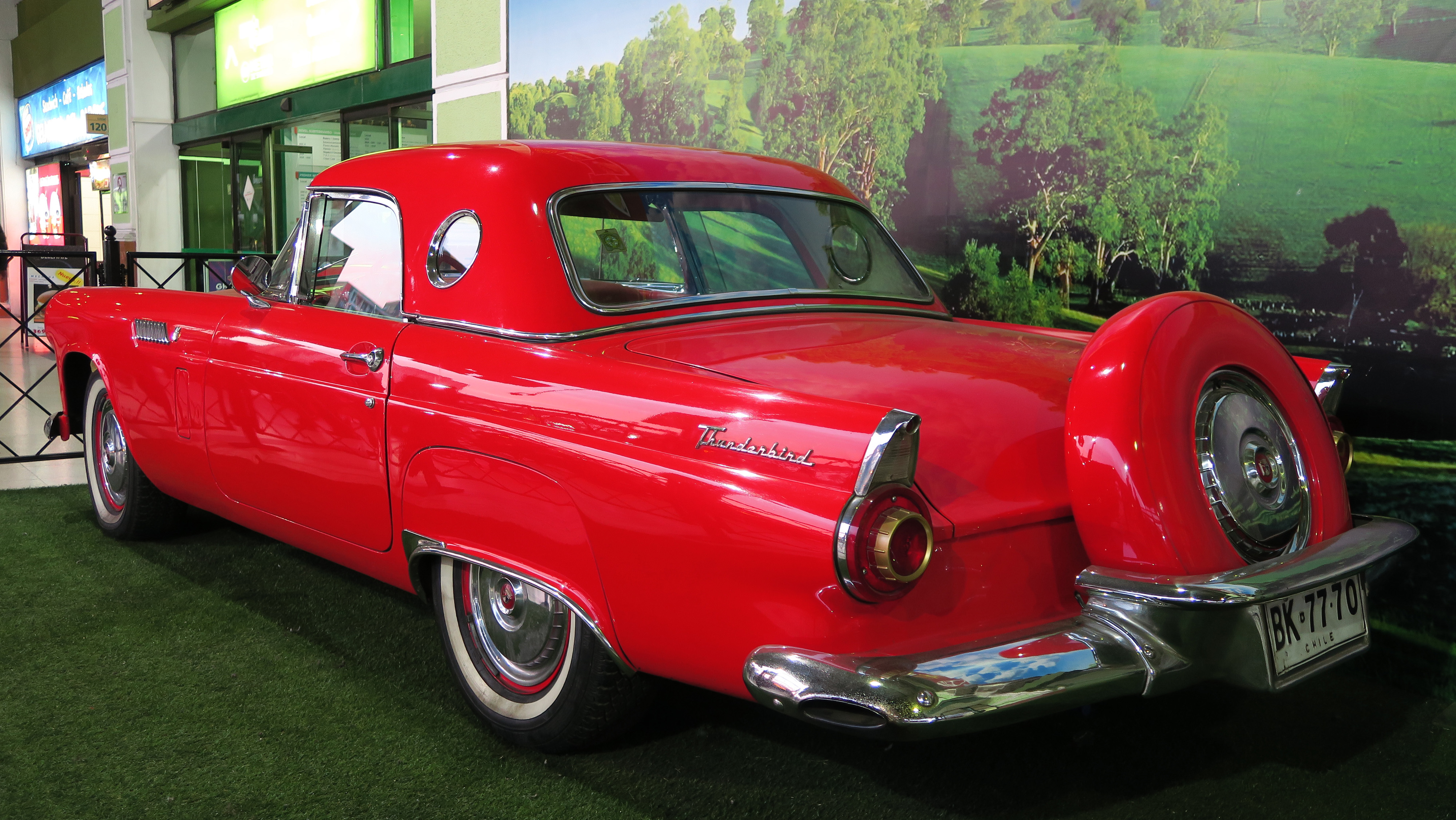
1956 Ford Thunderbird with factory mount

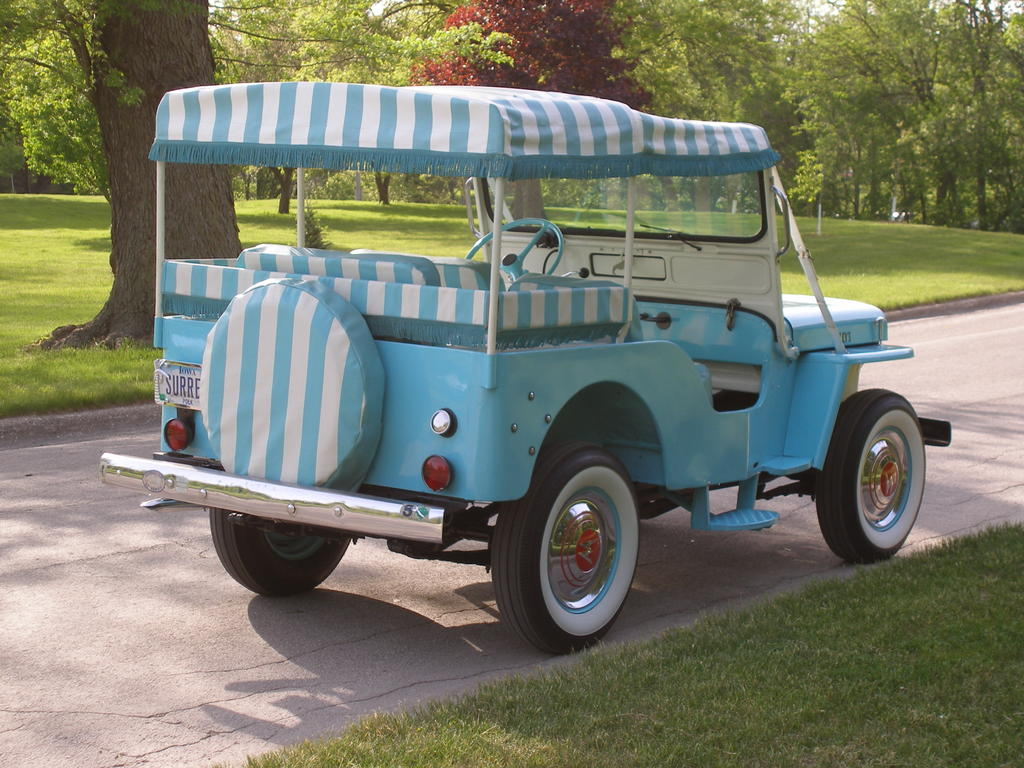
1964 Jeep Surrey Gala with factory mount

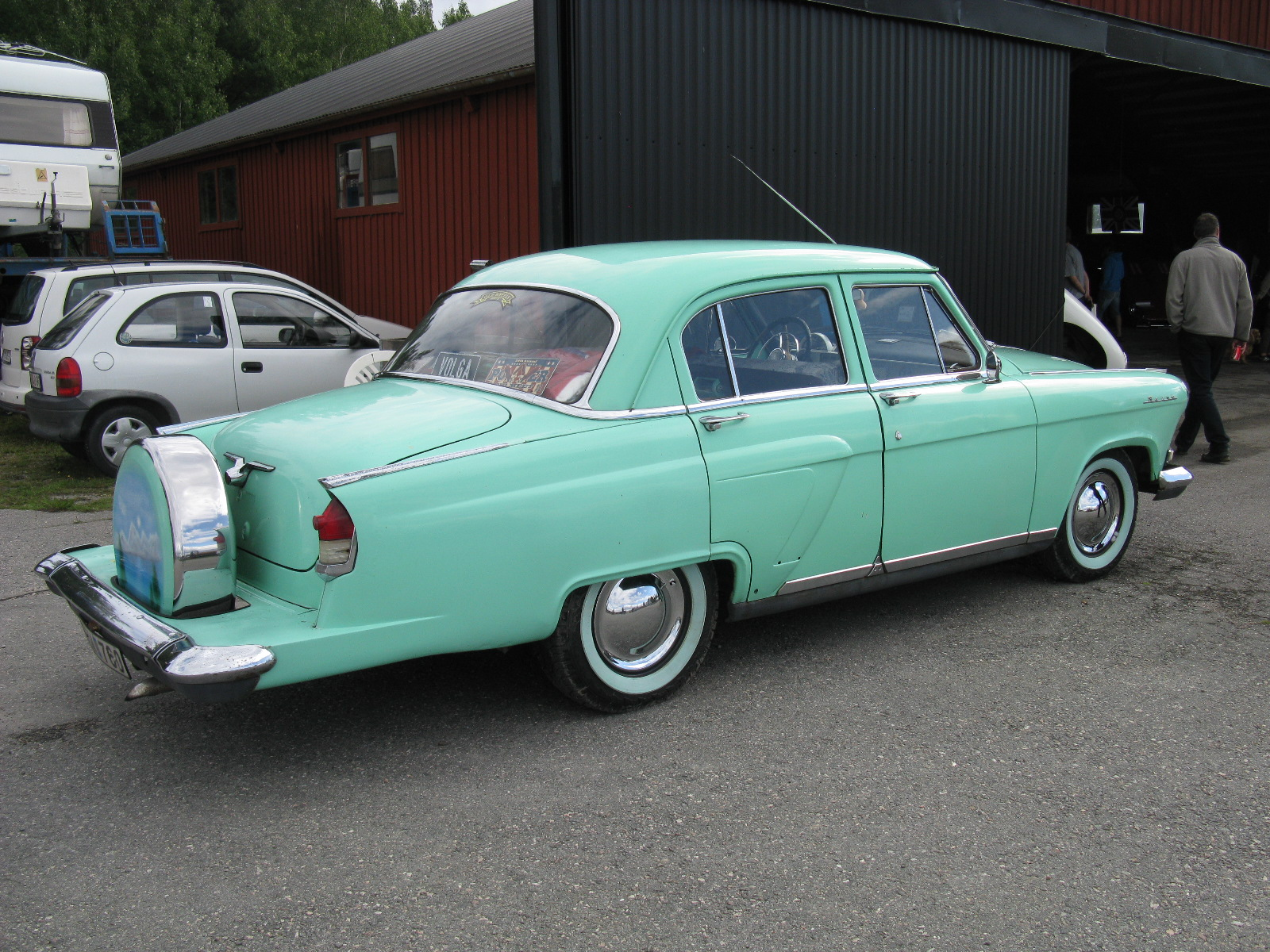
Russian Volga with custom aftermarket mount

Edsel Ford had a unique car custom-built after returning from a trip to Europe in 1938. He wanted a "continental look," and a spare tire mounted on the trunk. Using the Lincoln Zephyr chassis that was chopped and channeled, stylist Eugene T. "Bob" Gregorie, designed a convertible with a long hood and a spare tire mounted to the rear to reinforce the image of a low speedy automobile. The 1939 Lincoln Continental's short trunk with its external rear spare tire mount became a distinctive design. Reaction was so positive that Lincoln produced the car in 1940 through 1942 and returned after World War II, between 1946 and 1948.

While this was not the first car to either carry its spare above the rear bumper or integrate it into the rear bodywork, it became known as a "continental tire" even if the design was found on other brands.

Similar external spare tire placements were added as standard or optional to popular mass-market and also described as a "continental kit", borrowing their name from the production Lincoln Continental. The aftermarket accessory rear mounted spare became popular in the early 1950s using the "continental" description. These kits included extensions for the rear bumper with a valance between the repositioned bumper and body, thus forming a platform or shelf to mount the spare wheel and tire. Consumers were also able to have "continental kits" installed on almost any vehicle.

There is a legend that Henry Ford II complained that the trunk of his Ford Thunderbird did not have room for a set of golf clubs without removing the spare tire. The 1956 model year Thunderbird included a spare tire mounted outside as standard equipment. However, adding the weight of the tire and mounting behind the rear wheels affected the car's ride and handling adversely. For the 1957 model year, the Thunderbird's trunk was stretched 5 inches (127 mm) to allow the spare tire back inside, although the continental mounting was still optional. This external spare wheel mount became a customizing aftermarket appearance accessory during the 1950s.

In the United States, external continental tire mounting was a factory option for various types of cars during the 1950s and early 1960s. On some smaller models – such as on the Nash Metropolitan and Jeepster Commando – the continental tire was a standard feature. The two-passenger Nash Metropolitan's rear-mounted spare tire was more convenient because the trunk was accessible by folding down the seatback on the early (1954 through 1958) models. The large-sized 1957 Mercury Turnpike Cruiser was the top-of-the-line model and included what Ford described a "Dream Car Spare Tire Carrier" among its many standard features.

The car's rear bumper was often extended, and the tire had a fabric or metal cover. The bracket for the spare wheel was designed to swing away for access to the trunk. Manufacturers included continental tire mounts for their perceived "distinctiveness" and to increase luggage space in the trunk, such as on all the 1954 Nash Custom models.

The Jeep DJ was available in a "Surrey Gala" appearance package from 1959 until 1964. Included were a fringed top, seats, and a continental tire mount with a colorful vinyl-coated fabric covers in "candy stripes" of pink, green, or blue to match the car's body colors.

== Simulated continental tire ==
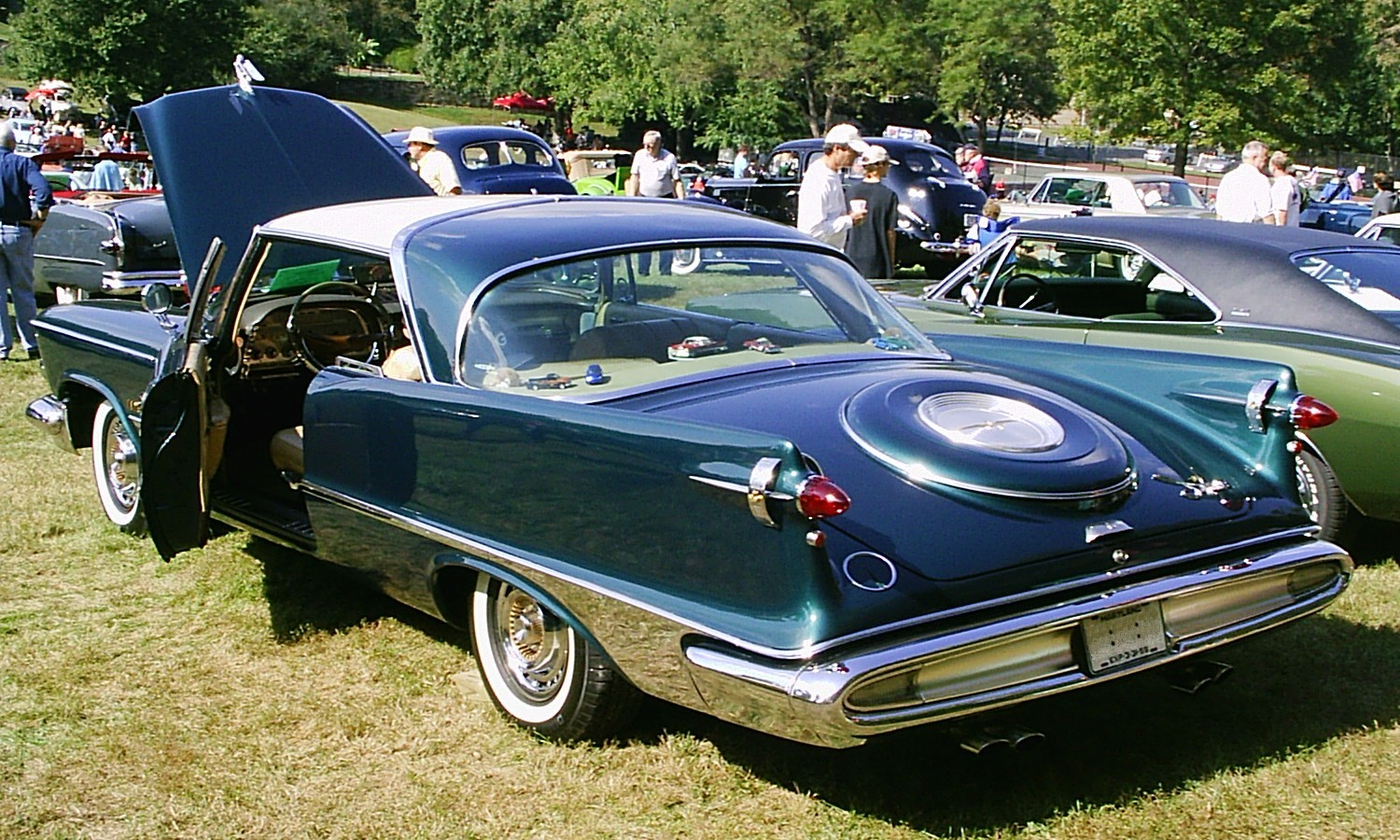
1959 Imperial with imitation spare tire bulge on its decklid

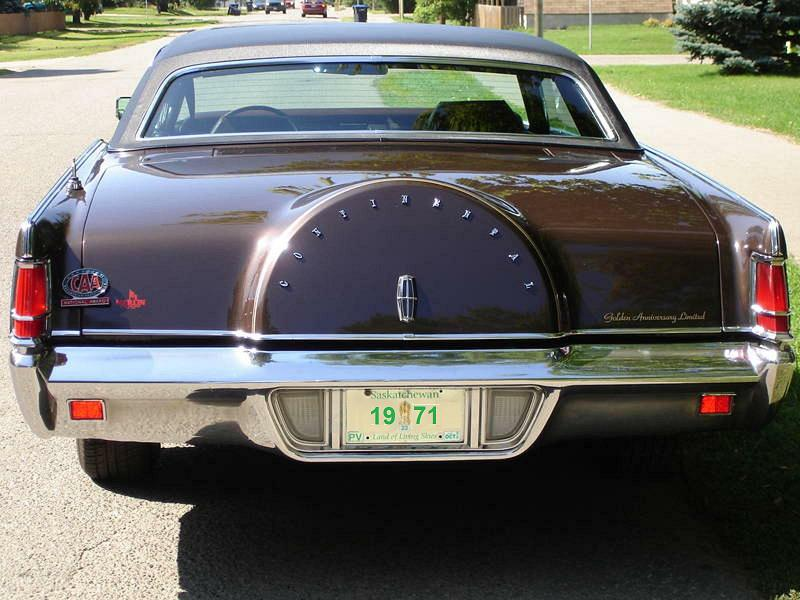
Continental Mark III with simulated spare tire bulge

Automotive historians also use this term to describe a nonfunctional circular bulge stamped into the trunk lid to give the impression of a spare tire. However, some argue that the spare hump is not "continental" anymore.

Several 1950s Italian-bodied Chrysler concept cars popularized this design feature. The trunk lid bulge was later embraced by Chrysler designer Virgil Exner and incorporated on many cars. The luxury 1957 Imperial was available with a simulated spare tire cover for the trunk lid. Subsequently, the design element was featured on mass-market models such as the 1959 Plymouth Belvedere and included on the compact Plymouth Valiant by 1960. Some critics described this bulging styling element on the trunk lid as a "toilet seat."

The Continental Mark III for 1969 included a "bump" in its rear deck lid to vaguely substitute the original 1939 Lincoln Continental spare tire design. Lincoln described this feature as its "traditional 'simulated' spare tire carrier". This distinctive rear design continued on the Mark series, including the Lincoln Mark VIII coupe produced through 1998.

Other cars that incorporated versions of a simulated spare tire bulge include a squared stylized suggestion of a Continental kit on the 1964 Imperials. The 1977–79 Lincoln Versailles was the first non-Continental branded Lincoln to feature the simulated spare tire bulge. The 1982 through 1987 Lincoln Continental "Bustleback" four-door sedan design prominently featured the Continental model name as part of the circular trunk lid bump.

== Modern use ==
Contemporary examples of continental kits are sometimes found on old and newer customized automobiles, including late-model Lincoln Continental cars that never included a factory design or option. It has become an accessory that typifies "the spirit" of the 1950s. After-market continental kits are available for customization of 200 different automobile models. Some after-market applications may not enhance the car's design.

Continental kits and trunk lid add-on spare tire trim were also made popular by the garish pimpmobile era of the 1970s and featured in "Super Fly" movies. Continental kits and simulated spare tires were also featured in some of the transformations done on the Pimp My Ride show.

Continental tires are known as 'fifth wheels' in hip hop slang. For example, in the Houston hip-hop culture, "slabs" feature a rear-mounted wheel "cut in half and enclosed in a fiberglass casing." There are custom continental kits for lowrider bicycles available.

== Rear mount tires ==
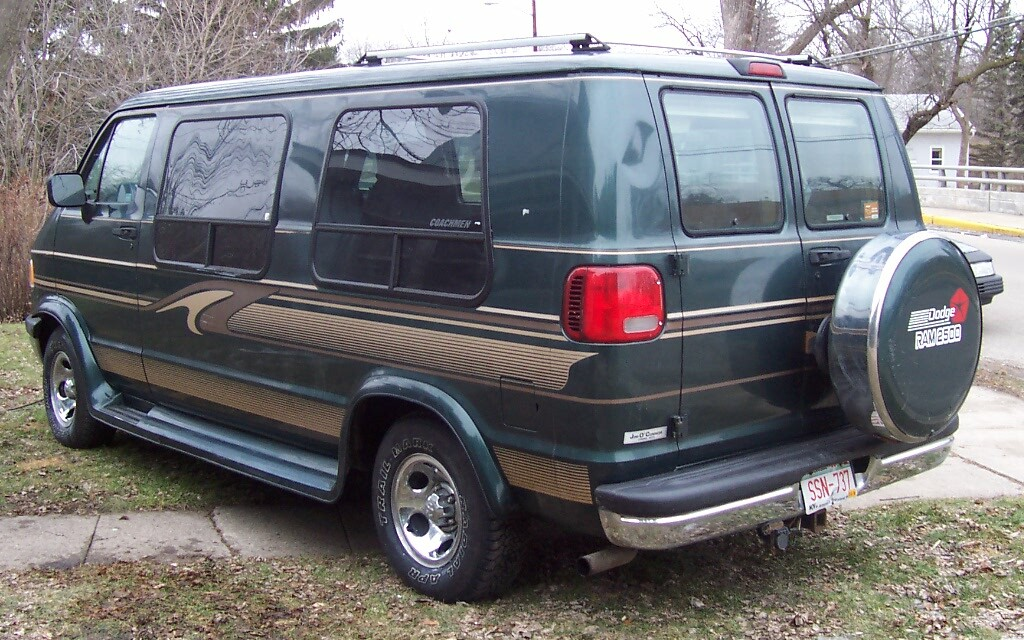
Outside rear-mounted spare tire on a van or recreational vehicle

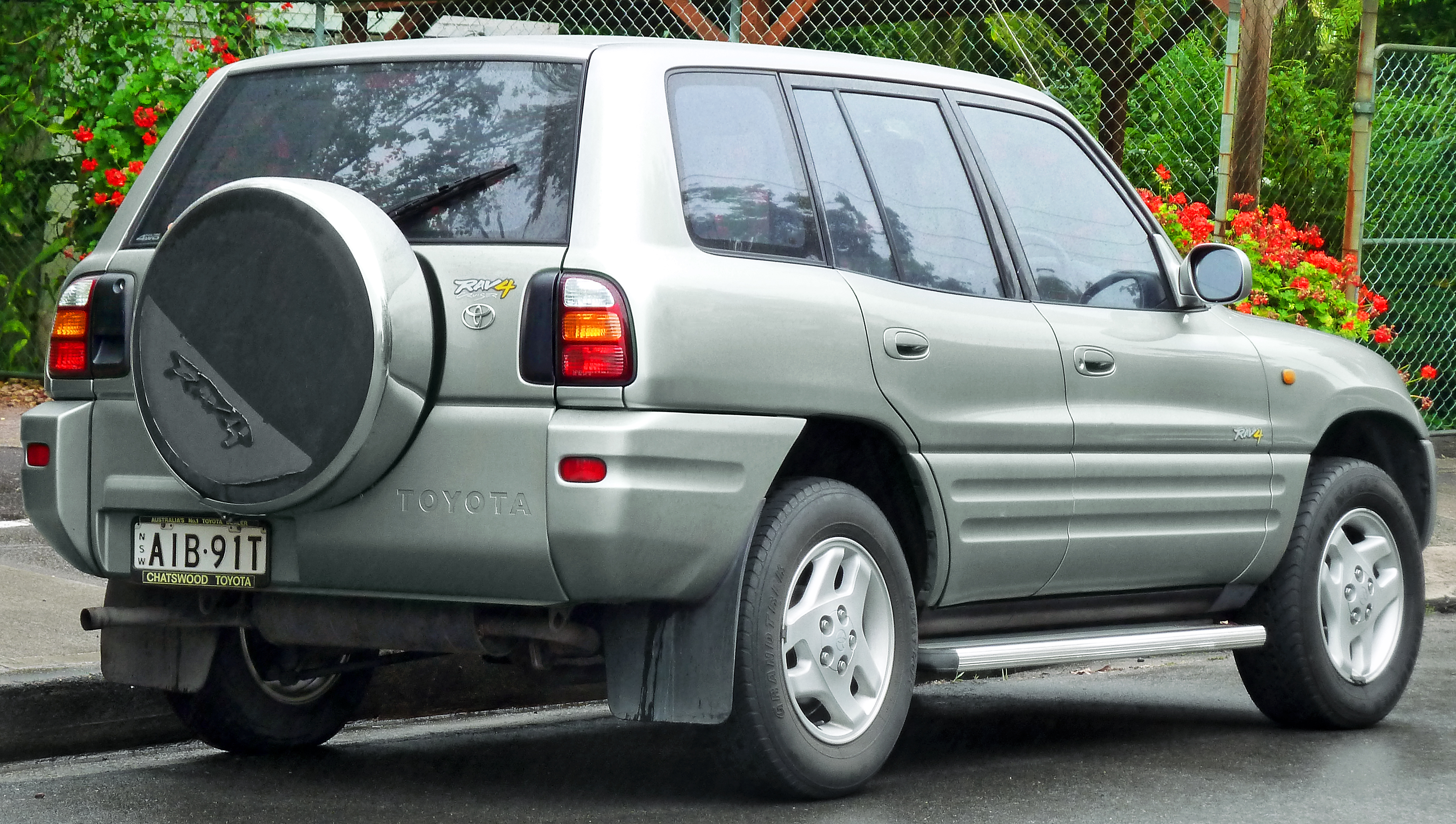
1998–2000 Toyota RAV4 with externally mounted spare tire

Numerous compact sport utility vehicle (SUV) models include an external rear-mounted spare tire from the factory, with no attempt to stylize it, just protect it from weather and theft. Accessory spare tire mounts that fit into a car's tow hitch are also available. Recreational vehicles may also have a spare tire on the rear. The wheel and tire combination may be exposed or covered with soft or hard materials and may feature logos or other designs. These rear spare tire mounts are no longer described as "continental tires". Moreover, manufacturers have improved the packaging to mount spare tires under the car or cargo area floor. The externally rear-mounted tire appears on Jeep Wrangler and Mercedes-Benz G-Class vehicles to facilitate easy access when off-road.

== See also ==
- Fender skirts
- Whitewall tire
- Spare wheel cover
