= Chrysler Imperial =

Luxury automobile

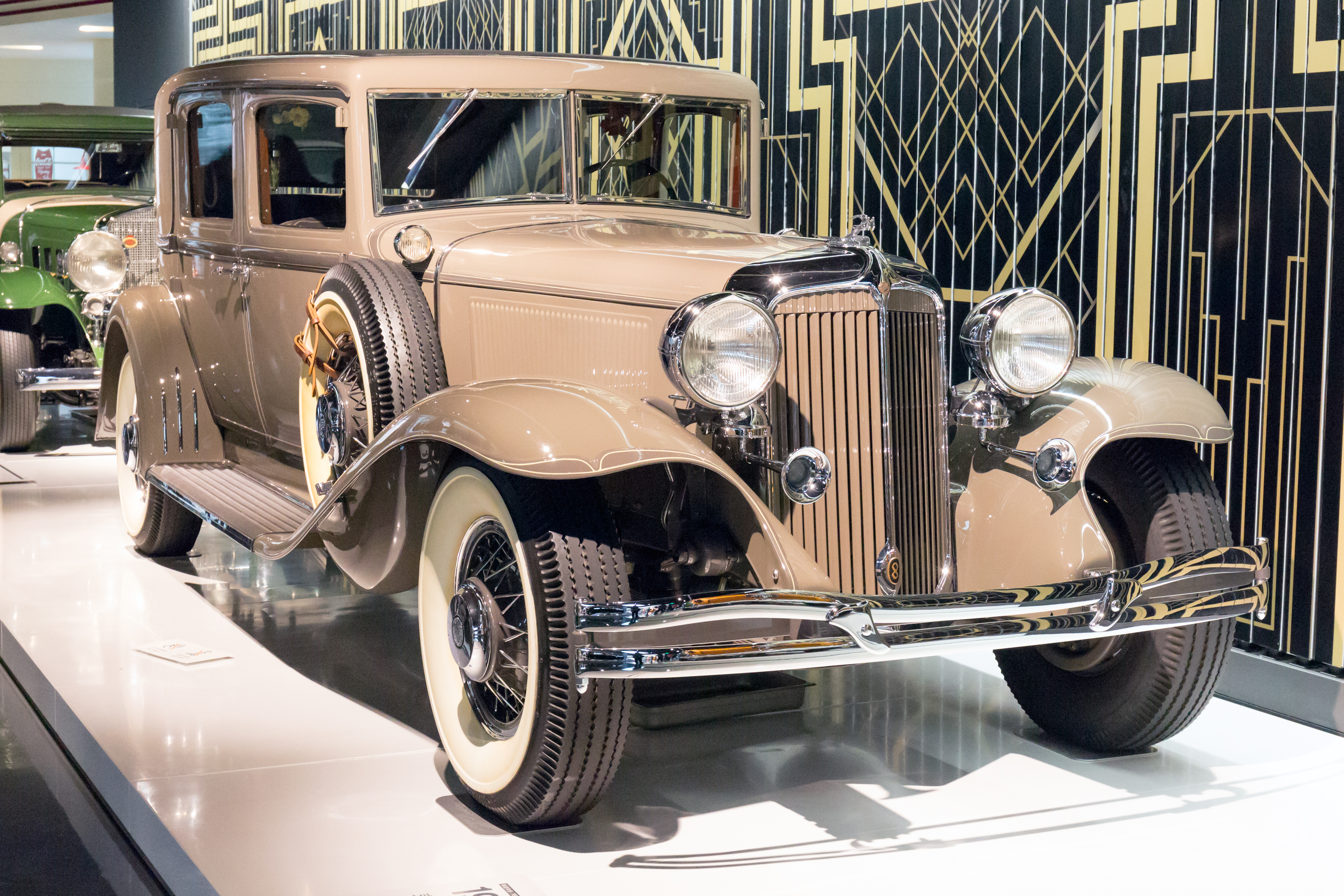
- 1931 Chrysler Imperial Series CG Sedan

Overview
- Manufacturer: Chrysler
- Production: 1926–1954; 1989–1993
- Model years: 1926–1954; 1990–1993

Body and chassis
- Class: Full-size luxury car
- Layout: FR layout (1926–1954); FF layout (1989–1993)

The Chrysler Imperial, introduced in 1926, was Chrysler's top-of-the-line vehicle for much of its history. Models were produced under the Chrysler name until 1954 (after which Imperial became a standalone make) and again from 1990 to 1993. The company originally positioned the Imperial as a prestige marque to rival Cadillac, Continental, Lincoln, Duesenberg, Pierce Arrow, Cord and Packard. According to Antique Automobile, its name means "sovereign, supreme, superior or of unusual size or excellence. The word imperial thus justly befits Chrysler's highest priced model."

For several decades and multiple generations, the Imperial was Chrysler's top model and a choice of transportation for senior executive leadership, government officials, royalty, and celebrities, compared to the less expensive Chrysler New Yorker. Over time, its appearance, technology, and interior features were updated alongside contemporary design trends. Limousines, town cars, and convertibles were the usual body styles, while custom coachwork options were offered by third-party builders including Derham, Fleetwood, and LeBaron.

The Chrysler Imperial rose was cultivated in 1952 and used to promote the brand.

== 1926–1930 ==
Series E-80 (1926)/Series 80 (1927)/Series 80L (1928-1930)
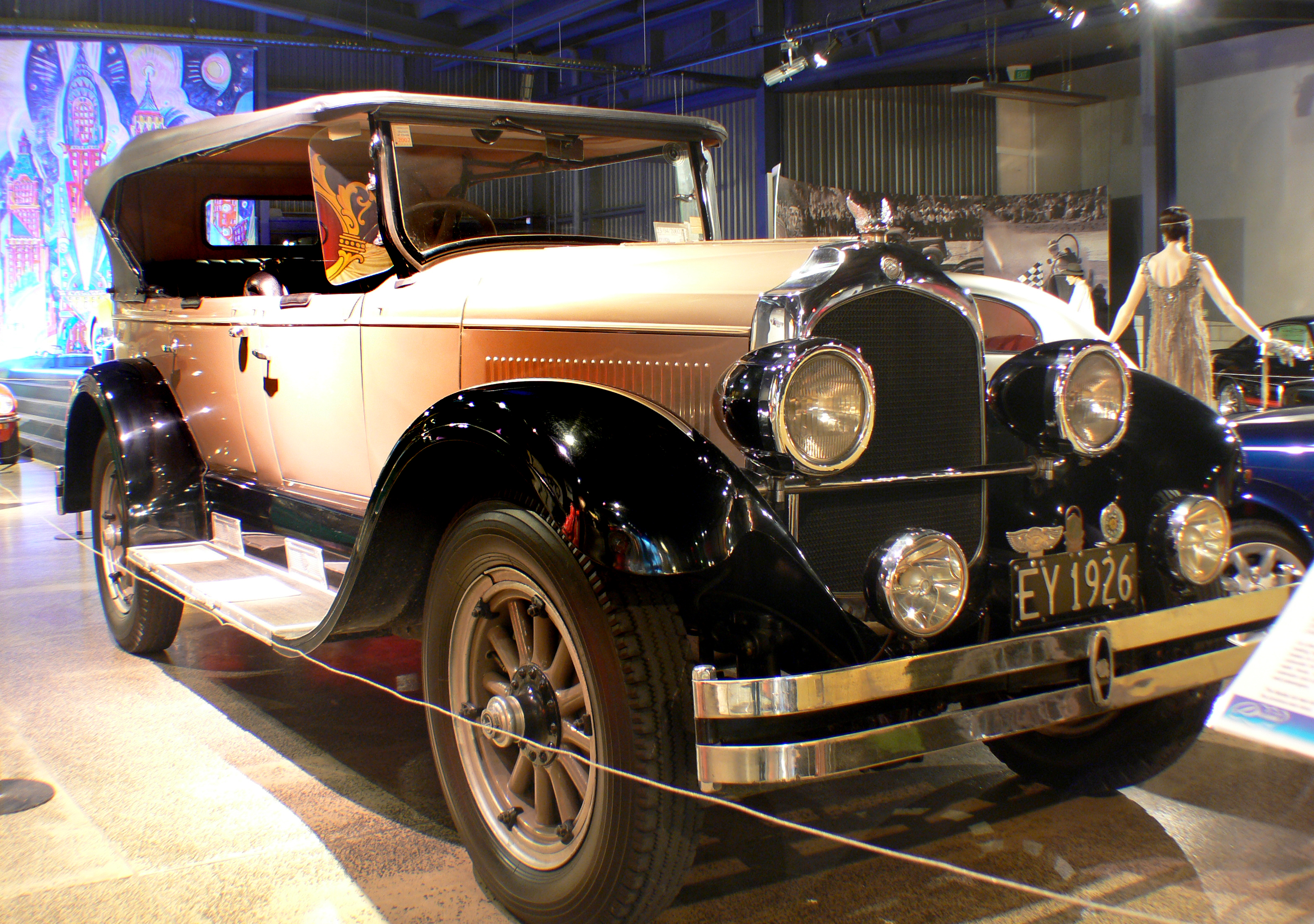
- 1926 Chrysler Imperial 80

Overview
- Production: 1926–1930
- Assembly: Detroit, Michigan (Jefferson Avenue Assembly)

Body and chassis
- Body style: 2-door roadster 2-door coupe 4-door sedan 4-door phaeton 4-door Limousine
- Layout: FR layout
- Related: Chrysler Six

Powertrain
- Engine: 288.6 cu in (4.7 L) Chrysler I6; 309.3 cu in (5.1 L) Chrysler I6
- Transmission: 3-speed manual 4-speed manual

Dimensions
- Wheelbase: 120 in (3,048 mm); 127 in (3,226 mm); 133 in (3,378 mm); 136 in (3,454 mm)
- Length: 183.5 in (4,661 mm) (1926–1927))

In 1926, Walter P. Chrysler decided to compete with North American marques Cadillac, Lincoln, Packard, Pierce Arrow, Studebaker, Cord, and Duesenberg in the luxury car field, while the newly formed company only had a large displacement straight-six to offer. The new model, called Imperial, had a new engine that was slightly larger than the company's standard straight 6 installed in the Chrysler Six. It was a 288.6 cu in (4.7 L) six-cylinder with seven bearing blocks and pressure lubrication of 92 brake horsepower (69 kW). Large displacement engines provided the horsepower and torque clients wanted and due to the low quality of gasoline fuel at the time, and low compression ratios, 50 bhp was more than adequate. It is estimated that the rating equivalent of early gasoline available varied from 40 to 60 octane and that the "High-Test", sometimes referred to as "fighting grade", probably averaged 50 to 65 octane. The front axle was solid and the suspension consisted of semi-elliptic leaf springs, while the rear suspension was a differential axle, and also using semi-elliptic leaf springs. The use of the "imperial" name being exclusively used on Chrysler's flagship had been previously used by Buick, Cadillac, and Packard for top level limousines. The hood ornament/radiator cap was a stylized Viking Winged helmet.

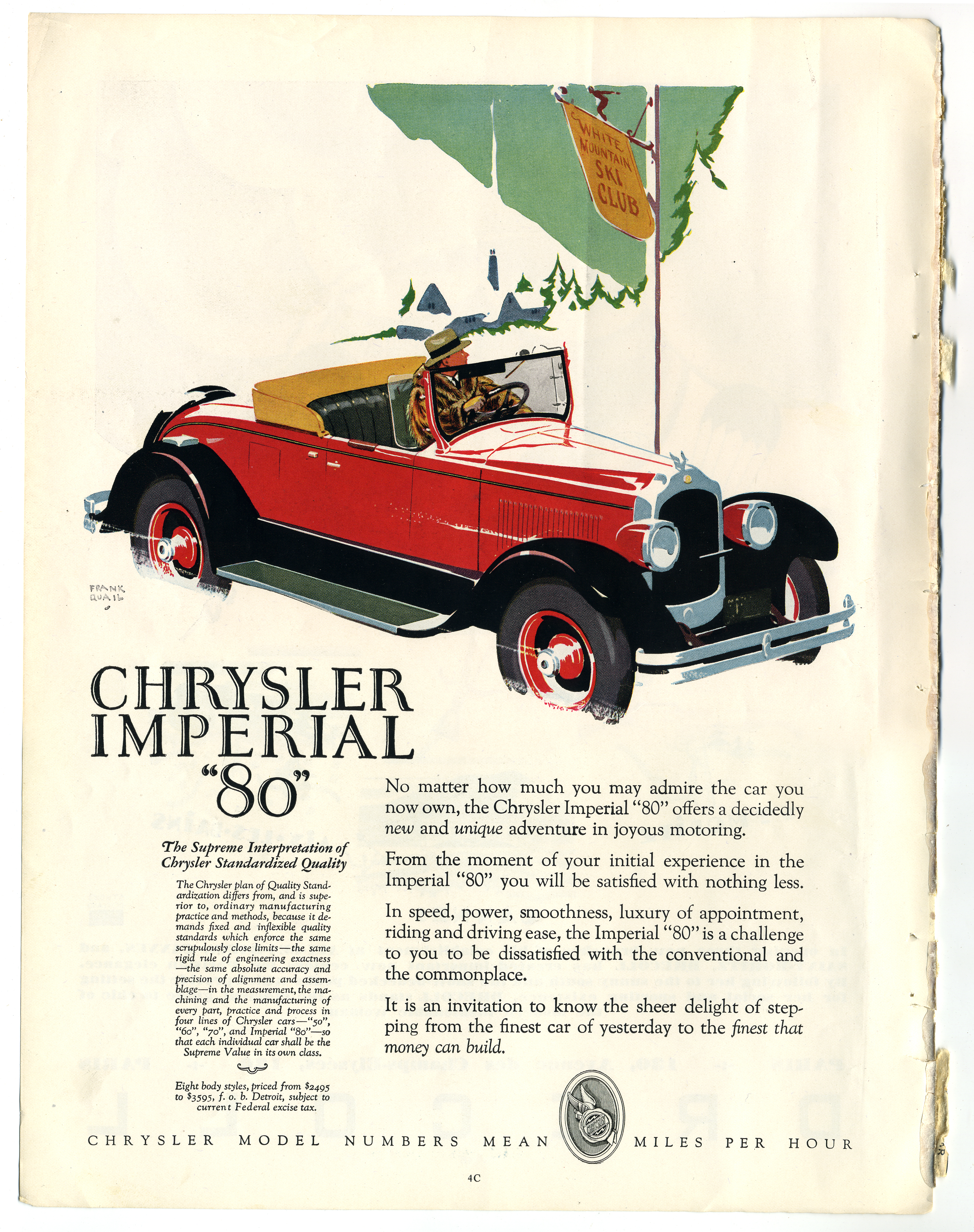
1927 Chrysler magazine ad disclosing that "Chrysler Model Numbers Mean Miles Per Hour"

The car set a transcontinental speed record in the year it was introduced, driving more than 6,500 miles (10,460 km) in a week. The car was chosen as the pace car for the 1926 Indianapolis 500. The model was designated E-80, with "80" representing the "guaranteed" 80 miles per hour (129 km/h) all-day cruising speed. Acceleration was also brisk, breaking 20 seconds to 60 miles per hour (97 km/h). Four-speed manual transmission was added in 1930. The attention to luxury and multiple body styles was a similar approach to one that Walter Chrysler used as president of the Buick, his employer from 1911 to 1919. Chrysler offered a variety of body styles: a two/four-passenger roadster (four passenger if car had the rumble seat), a four-seat coupé, five-passenger sedan and phaeton, and a seven-passenger top-of-the-line limousine. The limo had a glass partition between the front and rear passenger compartments.

Imperials could be distinguished from Chrysler products by the use of a distinctive scalloped hood and radiator shell and a 120 in (3,048 mm) wheelbase, which shared an appearance with Packard and the Buick Master Six. The Berline Limousine was listed at US$3,595 ($65,379 in 2025 dollars).

The 1927 Imperial Series 80 saw minor engineering improvements, while the high compression "Red Head" 288.6 cu in (4.7 L) straight-six was the only engine available on a choice of 120 in (3,048 mm), 127 in (3,226 mm) or special order 133 in (3,378 mm) wheelbases. Five two-door coachwork choices included roadsters and convertible, while there were nine sedan, town car, phaeton and limousine choices. The top level Town Car was listed at US$5,495 ($101,847 in 2025 dollars). Standard equipment on roadster and phaeton open-body coachwork selections included wind wings and leather exterior door trim panels, while many cars were painted in contrasting two-tone paint. The convertible was equipped with functioning landau irons. In 1927, an Imperial was driven at a high speed along the Lincoln Highway from San Francisco to New York to Los Angeles, covering a total distance of 6,726 mi (10,824.4 km) non-stop, with an average speed of 40 mph (64 km/h).

1928 offered a 136 in (3,454 mm) wheelbase with the designation Series 80L. Coachwork choices expanded with five provided by Briggs, and six choices from LeBaron, one Derham Convertible Sedan, one Phaeton from Locke, and four Dietrich convertible coupes and sedans. The Dietrich Convertible Sedan was listed at US$6,795 ($127,406 in 2025 dollars). Total Chrysler calendar year production was recorded at 160,670, their all-time pre-World War II high until decades later.

The 1929 and 1930 Series 80L were essentially unchanged from the 1928 version, as engineering efforts were focusing on the 1931 Series CG Straight Eight. There were some engineering advancements, such as a thermostatically controlled automatic adjusting exterior radiator shutters, vertical hood louvers, and a four-speed manual transmission. Coachbuilder Locke provided four convertible choices in both coupe and sedan configurations, and hydraulic four wheel brakes were now standard on all Chrysler products. The top level 1930 Series 80L Limousine was listed at US$3,575 ($68,901 in 2025 dollars).

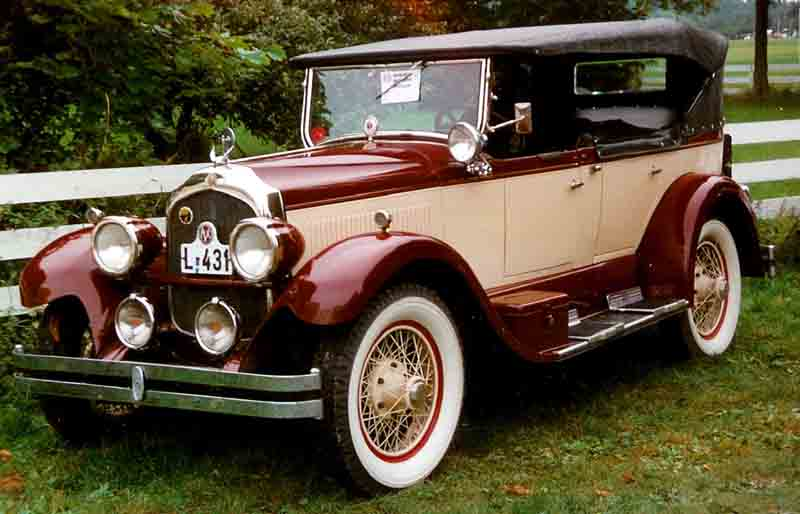
1926 Chrysler Imperial Series E80 Sedan by Briggs

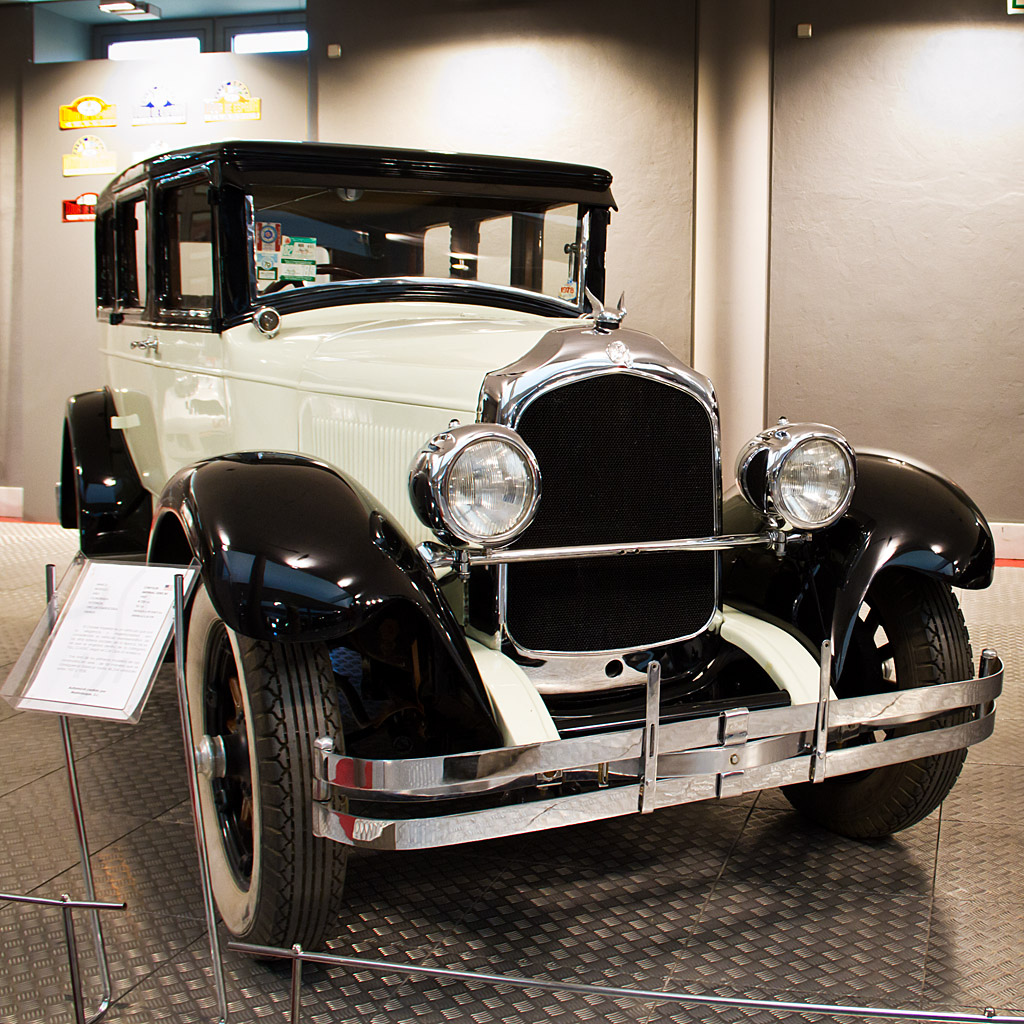
1927 Chrysler Imperial Series 80 Sedan by Briggs

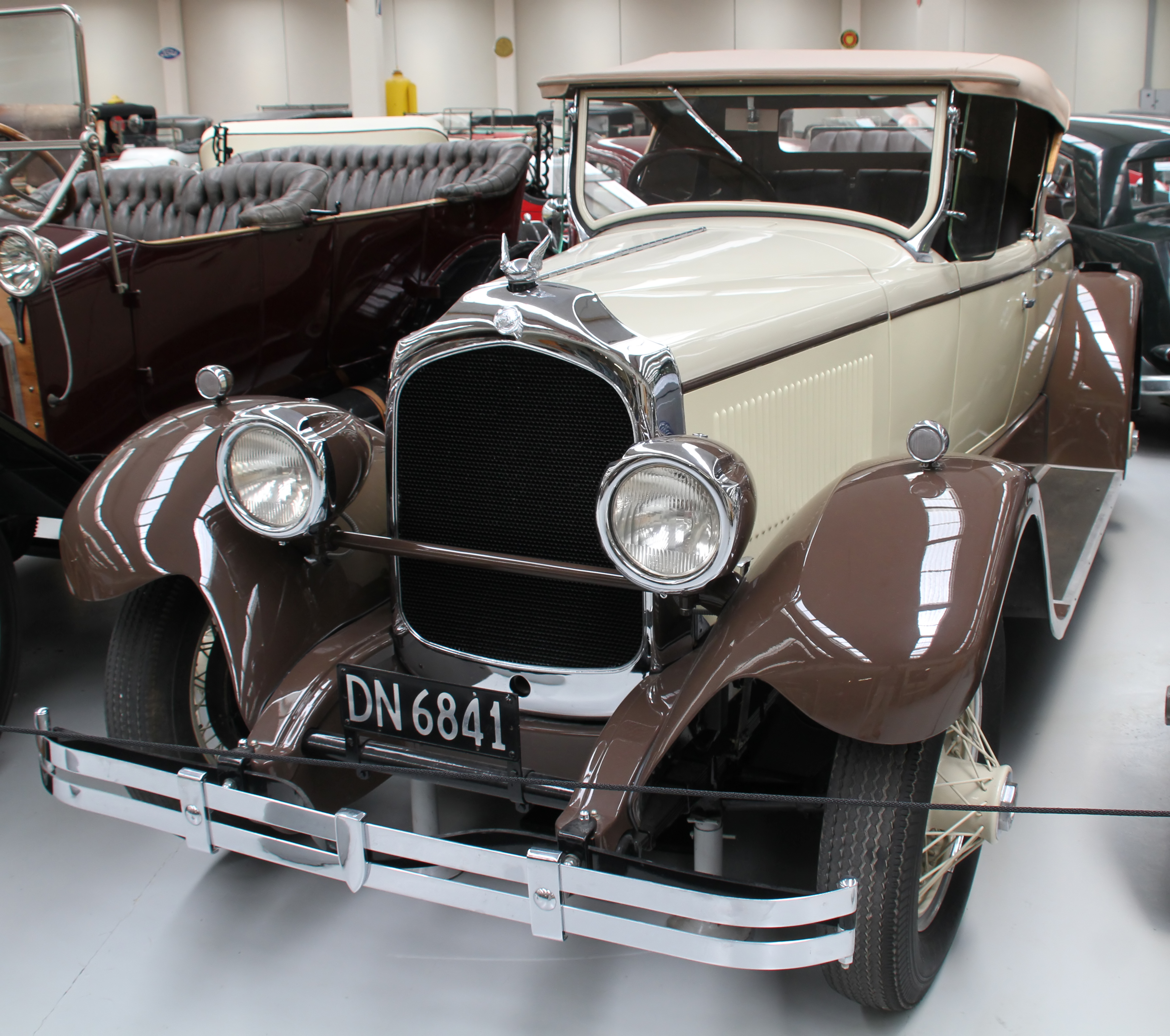
1927 Chrysler Imperial Series E-80 roadster

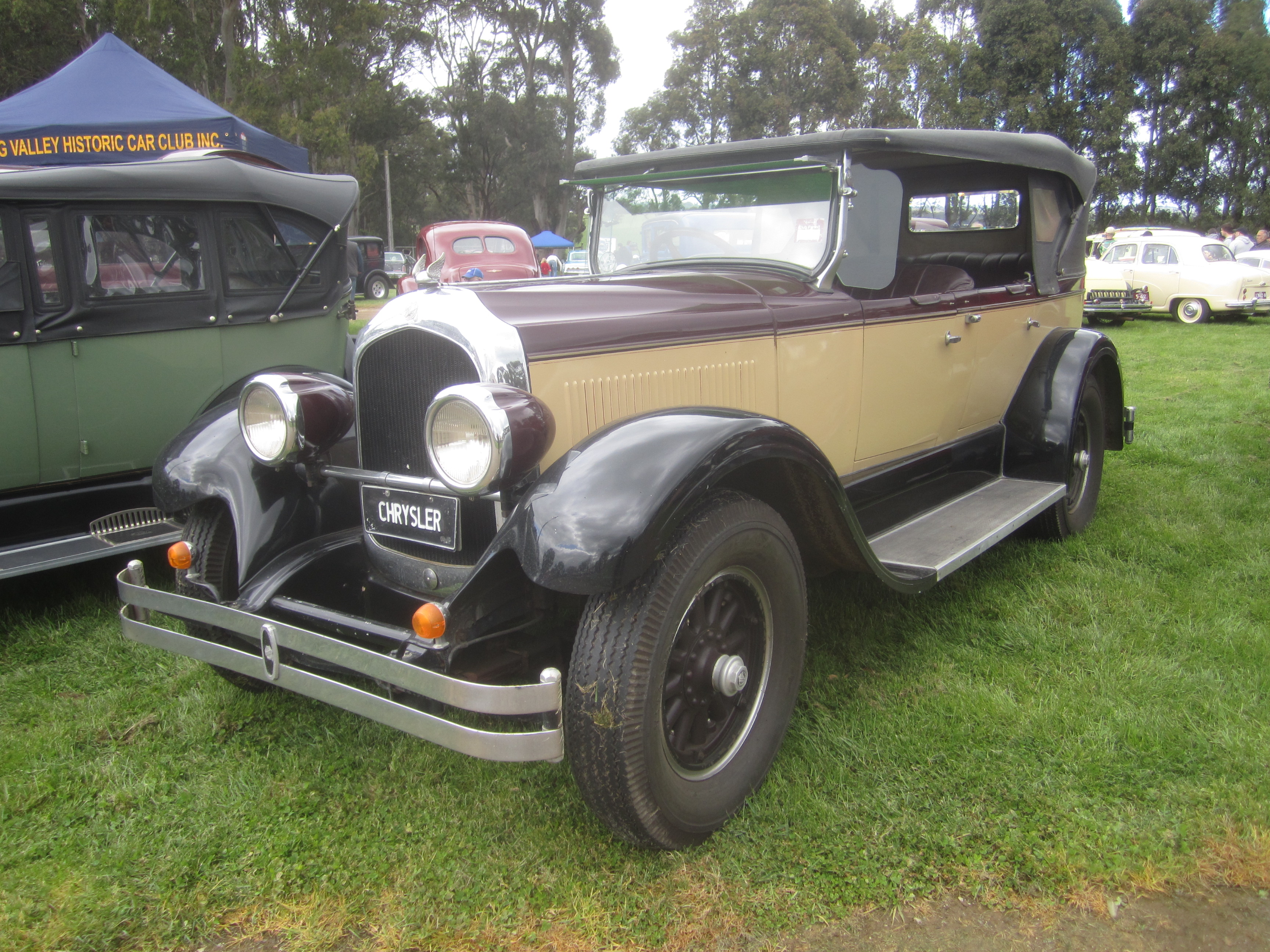
1928 Chrysler Imperial Series 80L Phaeton by Dietrich

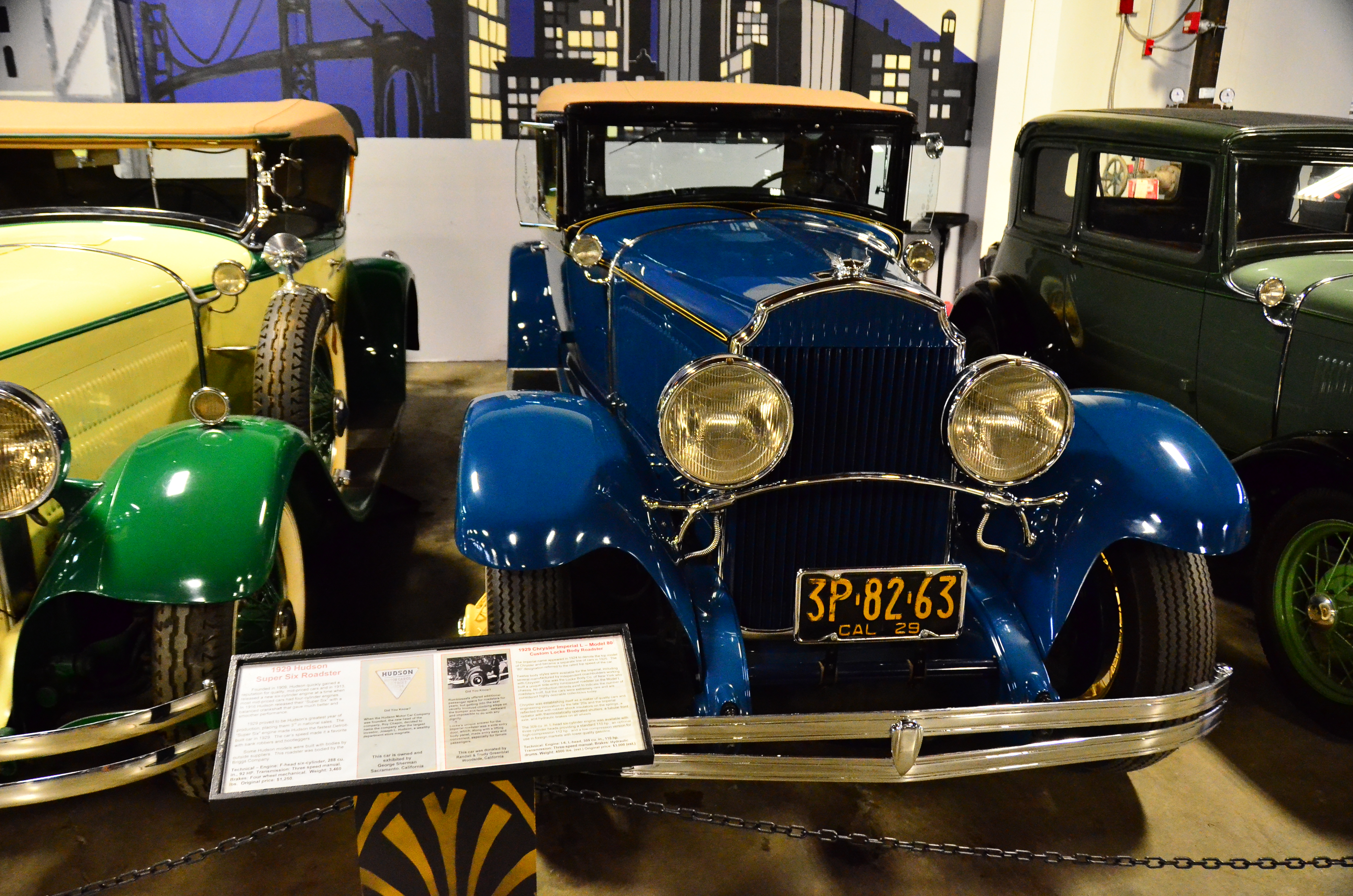
1929 Chrysler Imperial Series 80L Custom Roadster by Locke

== 1931–1933 ==
Series CG/CH&CL/CQ&CL
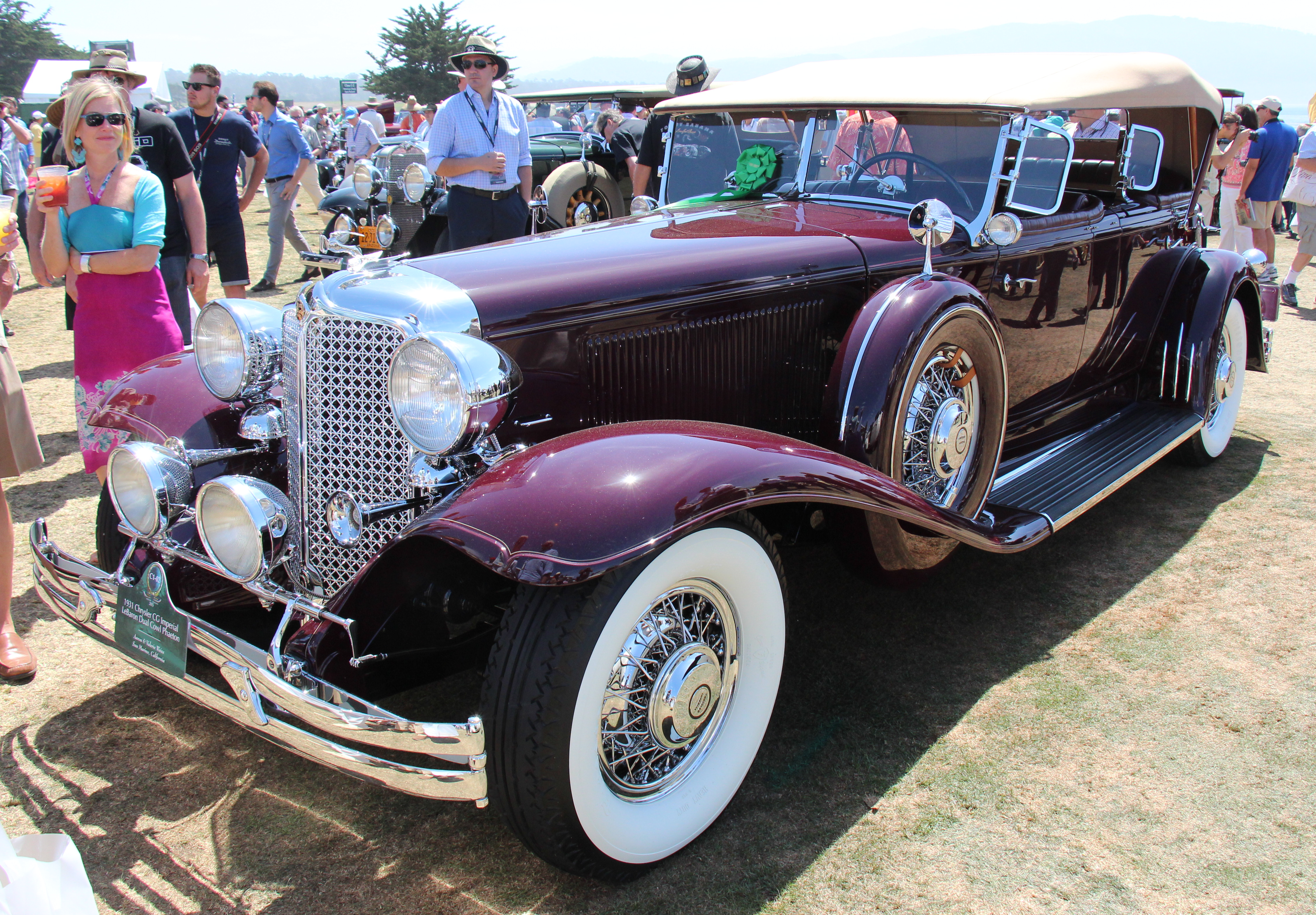
- 1931 Chrysler Imperial Series CG LeBaron Dual Cowl Phaeton w/gravel shield on radiator

Overview
- Production: 1931–1933
- Assembly: Detroit, Michigan (Jefferson Avenue Assembly)

Body and chassis
- Body style: 2-door roadster 2-door coupe 4-door sedan 4-door limousine 4-door convertible 4-door phaeton
- Layout: FR layout
- Related: Chrysler Royal; DeSoto Eight Series CF (1930); Dodge Eight (1930)

Powertrain
- Engine: 298.65 cu in (4.9 L) Chrysler I8 (Series CQ); 384.4 cu in (6.3 L) Chrysler I8
- Transmission: Multi-range 4-speed manual

Dimensions
- Wheelbase: 125 in (3,175 mm) (1933 Series CQ); 135 in (3,429 mm) (1932 Series CH); 145 in (3,683 mm) (Series CG & CL)
- Length: Imperial Custom 212.5 in (5,398 mm) (1932)

The 1931 Chrysler Imperial 8 introduced the new in-line 8-cylinder engine, which was shared with the Chrysler Eight Series CP in smaller displacements. The car received a new 384.4 cu in (6.3 L) Chrysler flathead Straight-8 with a Stromberg Model DD-3 carburetor. The Imperial, which showed visual similarities to the Cord L-29, introduced a vee-type radiator, a long, straight hood that displayed "torpedo" styling, and wide flowing fenders with a split and slanted windshield. Various features considered luxurious in nature at the time included dual sun visors, adjustable front seats and steering column, rust-proof fenders, wire-spoked wheels, automatic heater control, safety glass and Lockheed-supplied hydraulic brakes. To minimize engine vibration from being felt by passengers, an isolation feature called "Floating Power" was introduced.

The Imperial Series CG, introduced shortly after the Rolls-Royce Phantom II, Mercedes-Benz 770, Packard Eight, Duesenberg Model J, Renault Reinastella, Cadillac Series 355, and Lincoln K-series, offered four sedan coachwork choices from Briggs, while LeBaron offered four convertible coupe and sedan choices. At least ten Individual Custom 2-door coupes were documented from individual coachwork providers Waterhouse, Drauz and LeBaron. These were custom built to specification, and were variously equipped with anything the customer desired, even a Dictaphone. Prices ranged from US$2,745 ($58,114 in 2025 dollars) for the factory supplied four-door, five-passenger Sedan to US$3,575 ($75,685 in 2025 dollars) for the LeBaron Dual Cowl Phaeton. Stock car driver Harry Hartz set numerous speed records with a 1933 Imperial sedan at Daytona Beach, Florida. A roadster was entered in the 1931 24 Hours of Le Mans competition, but did not finish due to radiator failure. Total documented CG production shows that 3,228 of all body style choices were manufactured, including chassis only supplied to individual coachwork providers. A stylized gazelle statuette was added to the Viking Winged helmet radiator cap and hood ornament for all Imperial vehicles starting in 1931.

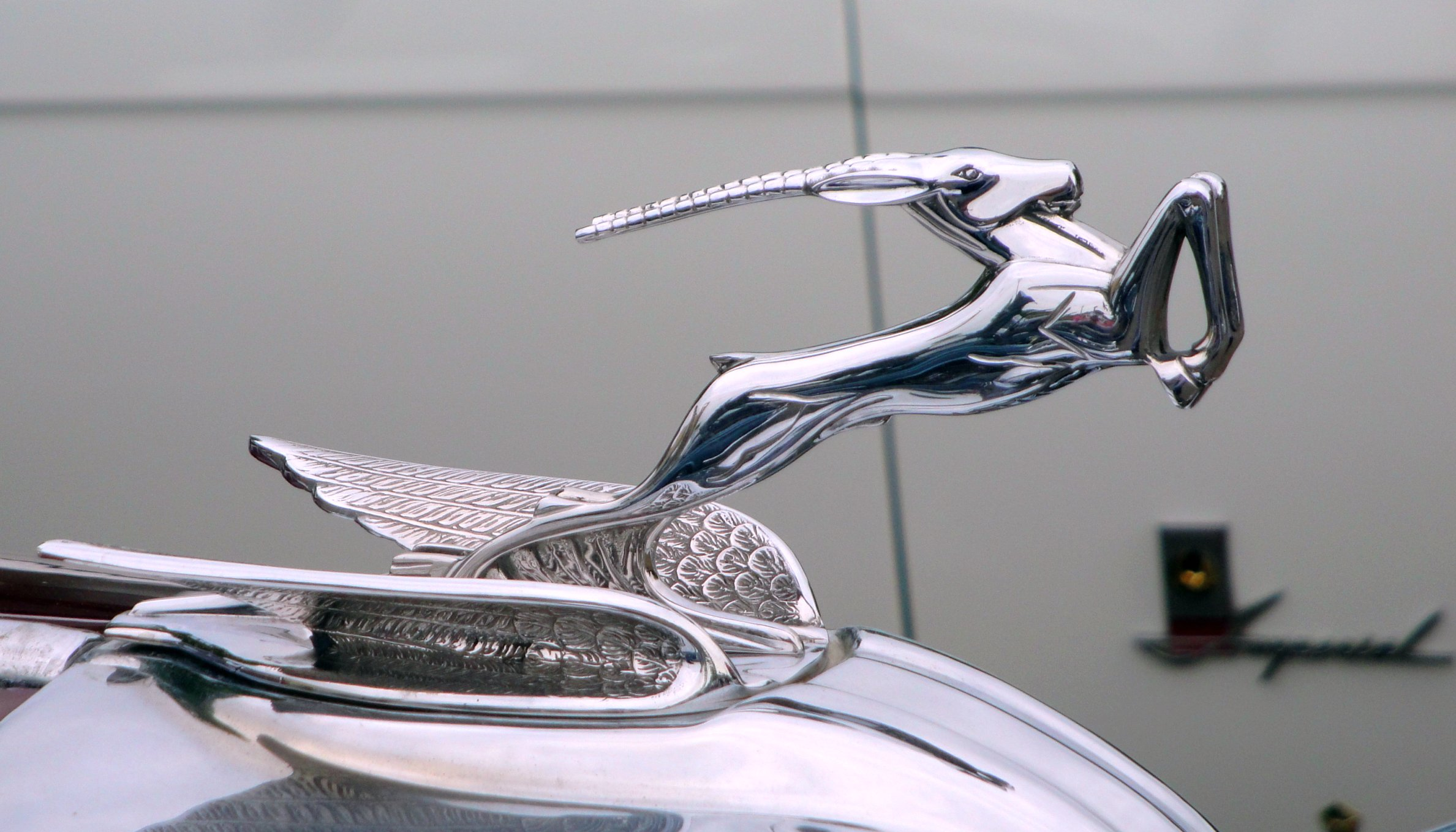
Hood ornament

For 1932, the junior Series CH Imperial was introduced, while the previous Series CG became the Series CL and took the name Imperial Custom to continue to provide individually requested, customized vehicles. The Series CH was related to the Chrysler Series CP, in that the straight-eight engine and most features were shared, while the Imperial Series CH was offered with many standard features that were optional on the Series CP. The Series CH and CL featured all steel body work, a double drop "girder truss" chassis frame, split windshields, dual sun visors, and trumpet horns. The ignition was provided by Delco-Remy, the brakes were hydraulic and the transmission was a four-speed manual transmission with an optional automatic vacuum operated clutch. The body styles offered on the Series CH were a two-door, two-passenger roadster convertible with available rumble seat, a four-door sedan or a four-door convertible. The roadster listed price was US$1,925 ($45,425 in 2025 dollars), while the four-door convertible was US$2,195 ($51,797 in 2025 dollars). This made the more esteemed Imperial brand almost identically priced to Chrysler-branded products, even though the engine displacement on the Series CH was larger. The 1932 Series CL remained the more prestigious Imperial model, and all coachwork was provided by LeBaron, offering four convertible body styles along with a conventional seven-passenger sedan or eight-passenger limousine. Documented records show that one two-passenger Roadster and one Landau Limousine were manufactured. Records show that 32 Series CL Sedan Limousine by LeBaron were sold for US$3,295 ($77,754 in 2025 dollars).

The Series CQ Imperial was new for 1933 from the previous Series CH. The wheelbase lost 10 in (254 mm) and the 298.65 cu in (4.9 L) Chrysler I8 had reduced displacement. Three two-door, two-passenger coupes to include a Victoria and Roadster Convertible, and two four-door, five-passenger choices with one sedan convertible were offered by Briggs. Mechanical improvements offered were a silent, helical gear three-speed transmission, an improved oil filter, and an automatic choke for the Stromberg IV Model EX-32 carburetor. Only three sedan coachwork choices were offered for the Series CL sedan with the 146 in (3,708 mm) wheelbase. According to production records, 3,838 Series CQ and 151 Series CL were manufactured, including six Chassis and Cowl only requests.

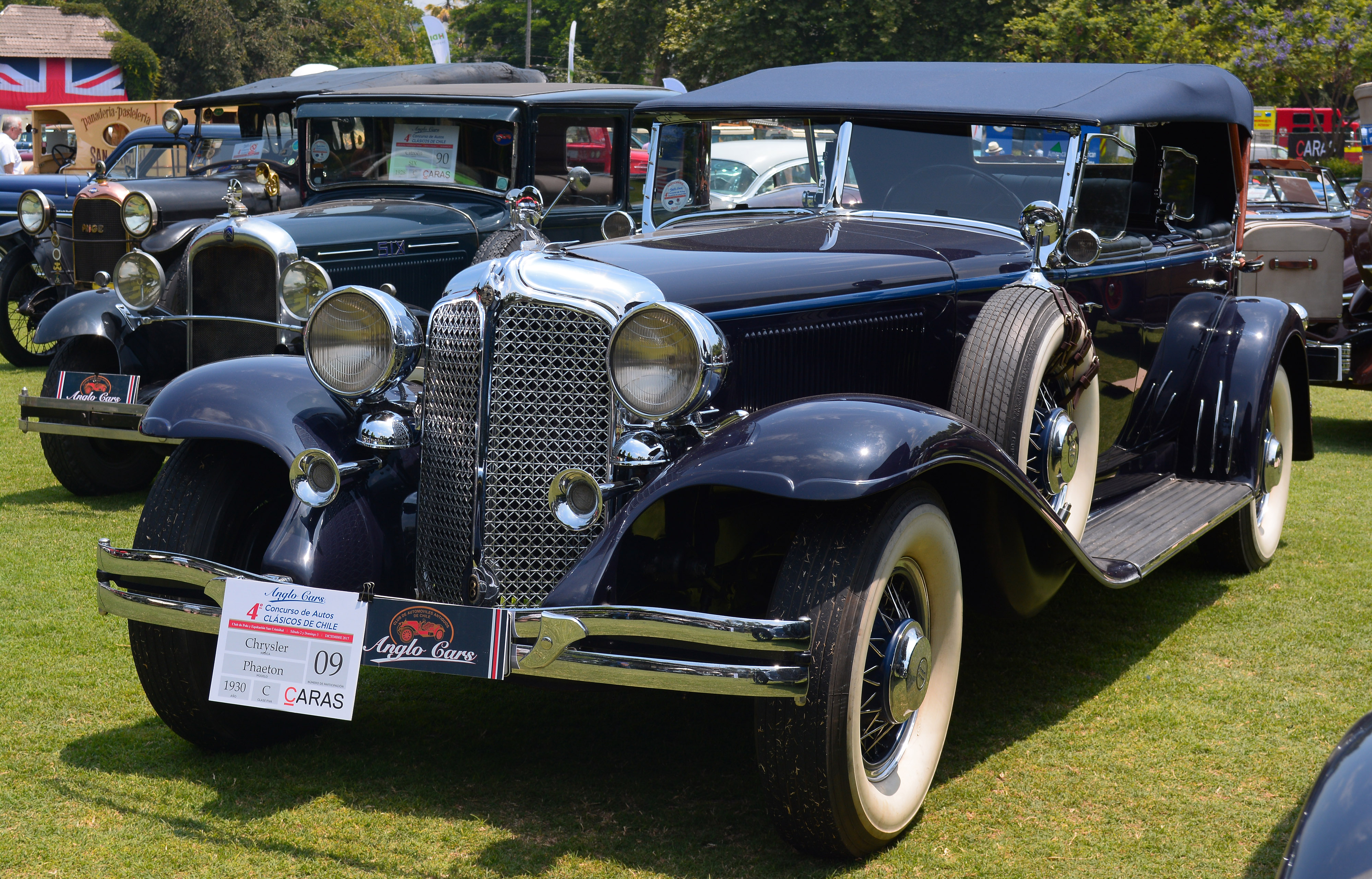
1931 Chrysler Imperial Series CG Phaeton

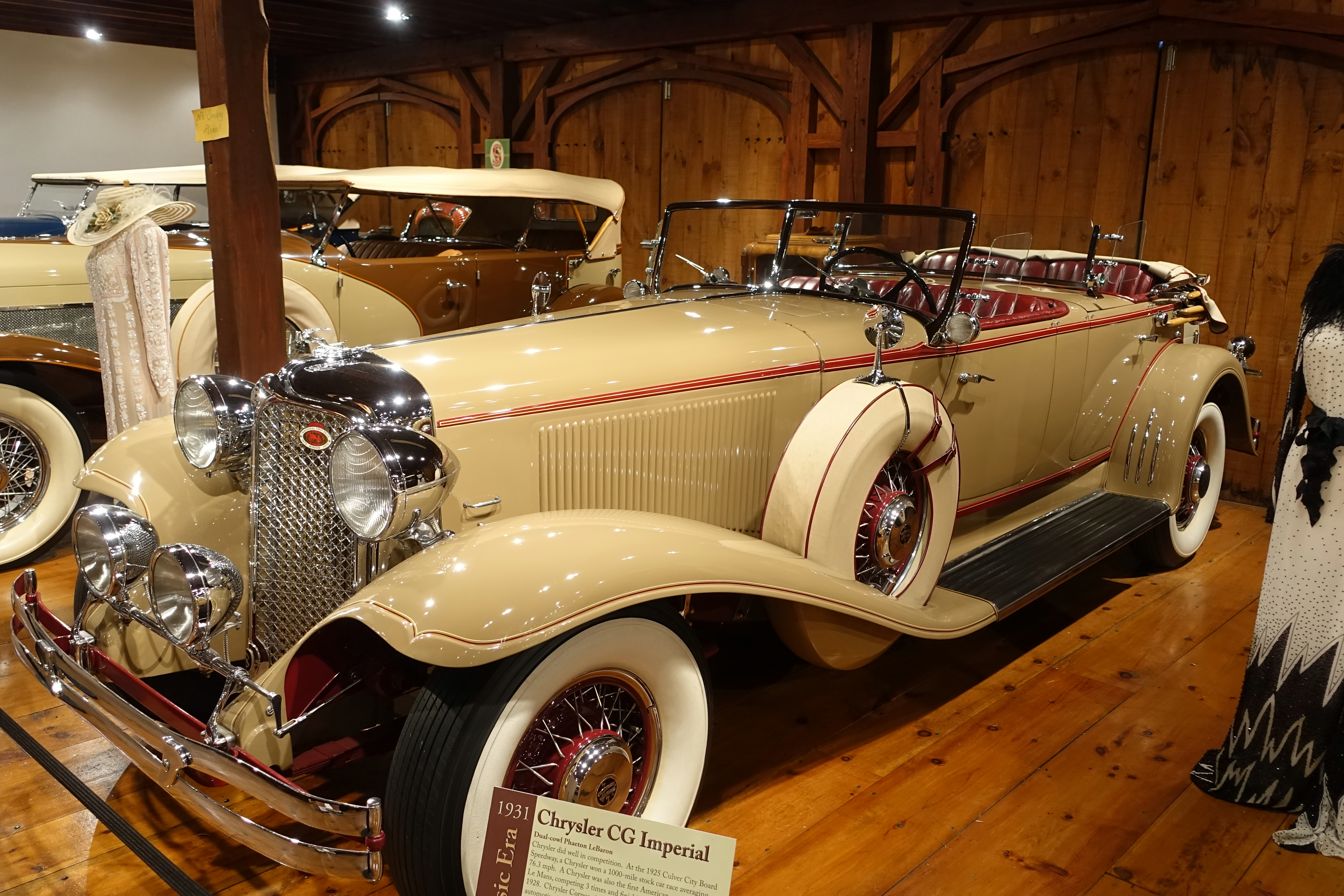
1931 Chrysler Imperial Series CG Dual Cowl Phaeton by LeBaron

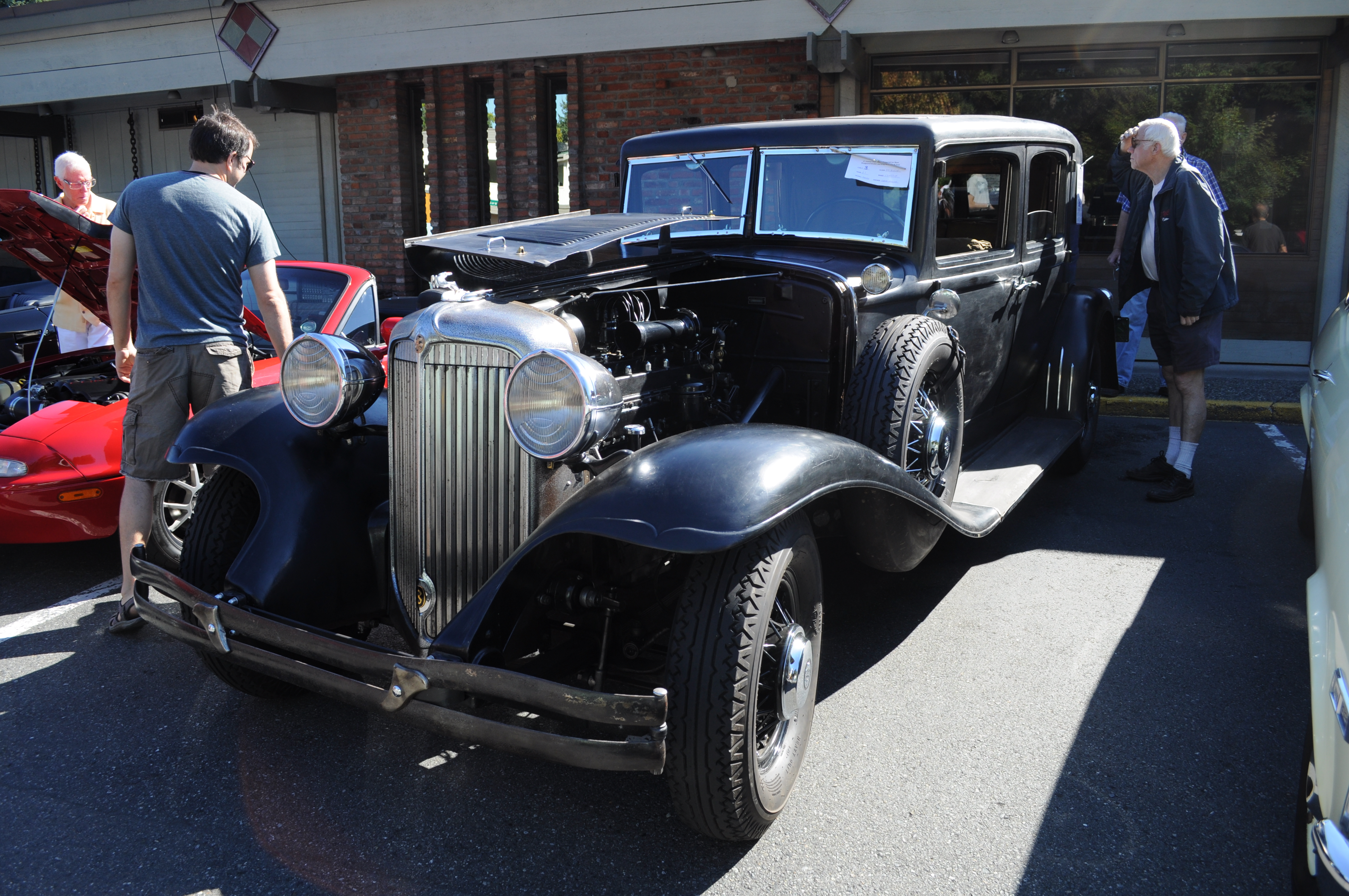
1931 Chrysler Imperial Series CG by Briggs

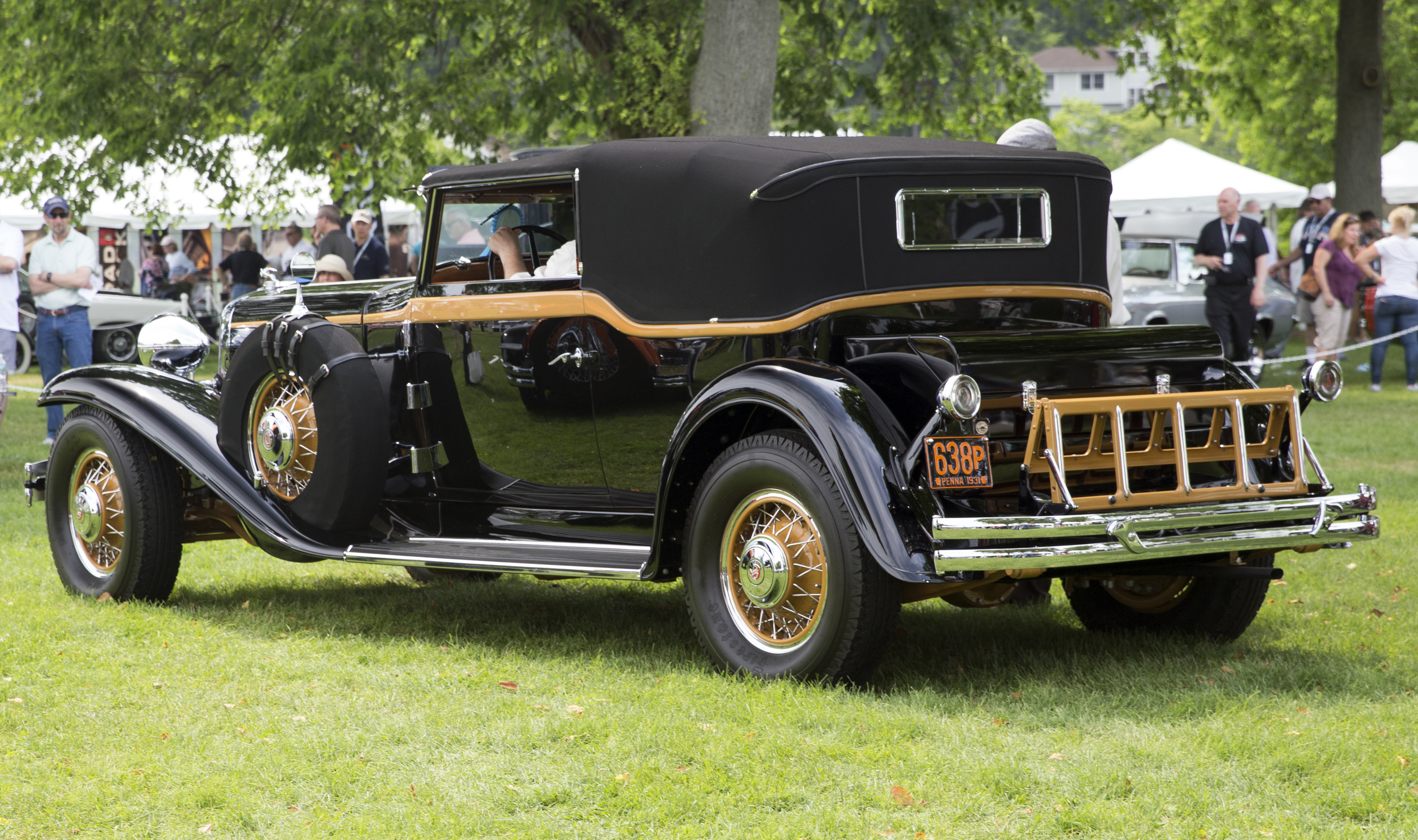
1931 Chrysler Imperial Series CG Convertible Victoria by Waterhouse

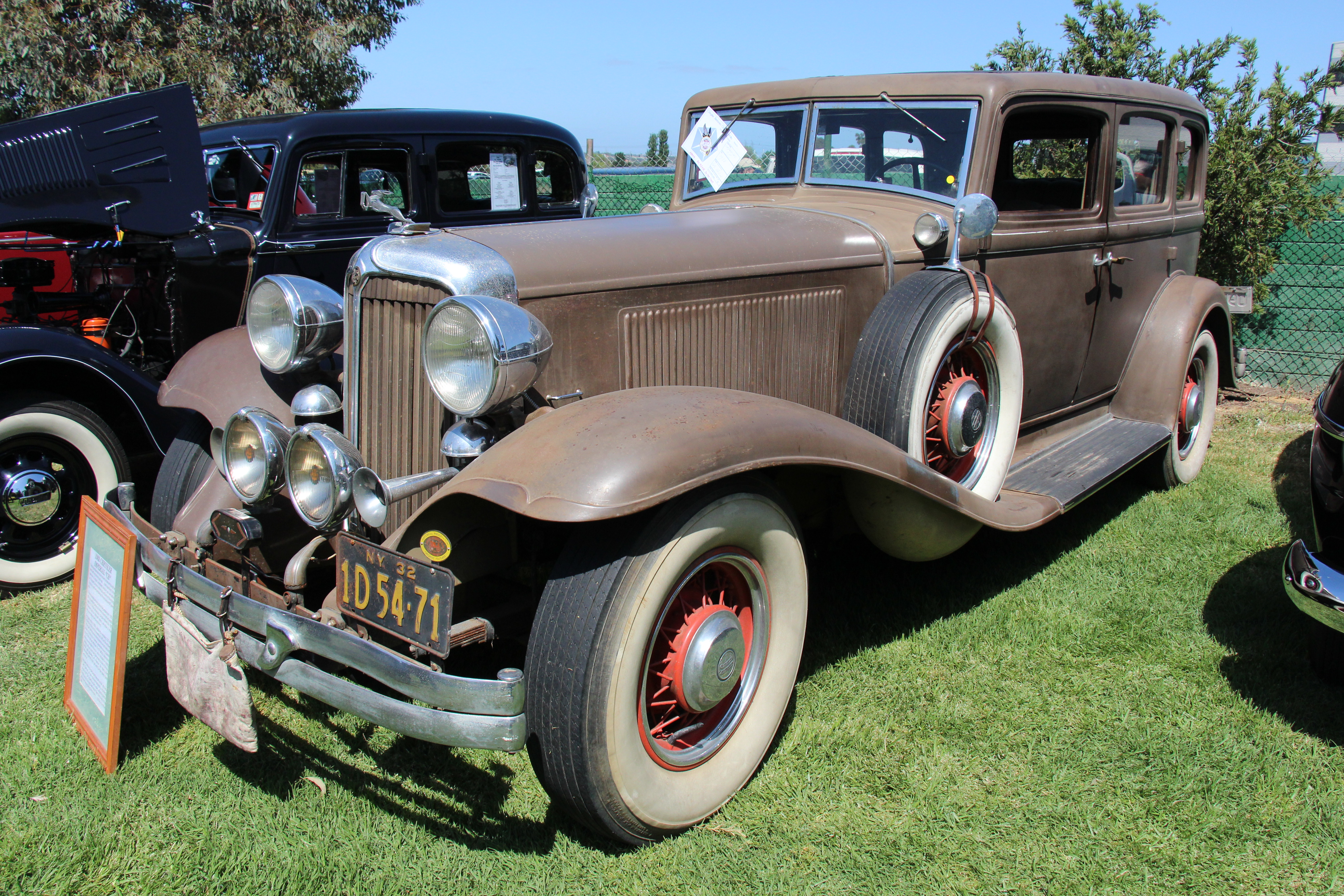
1932 Chrysler Imperial Series CH Sedan by Briggs

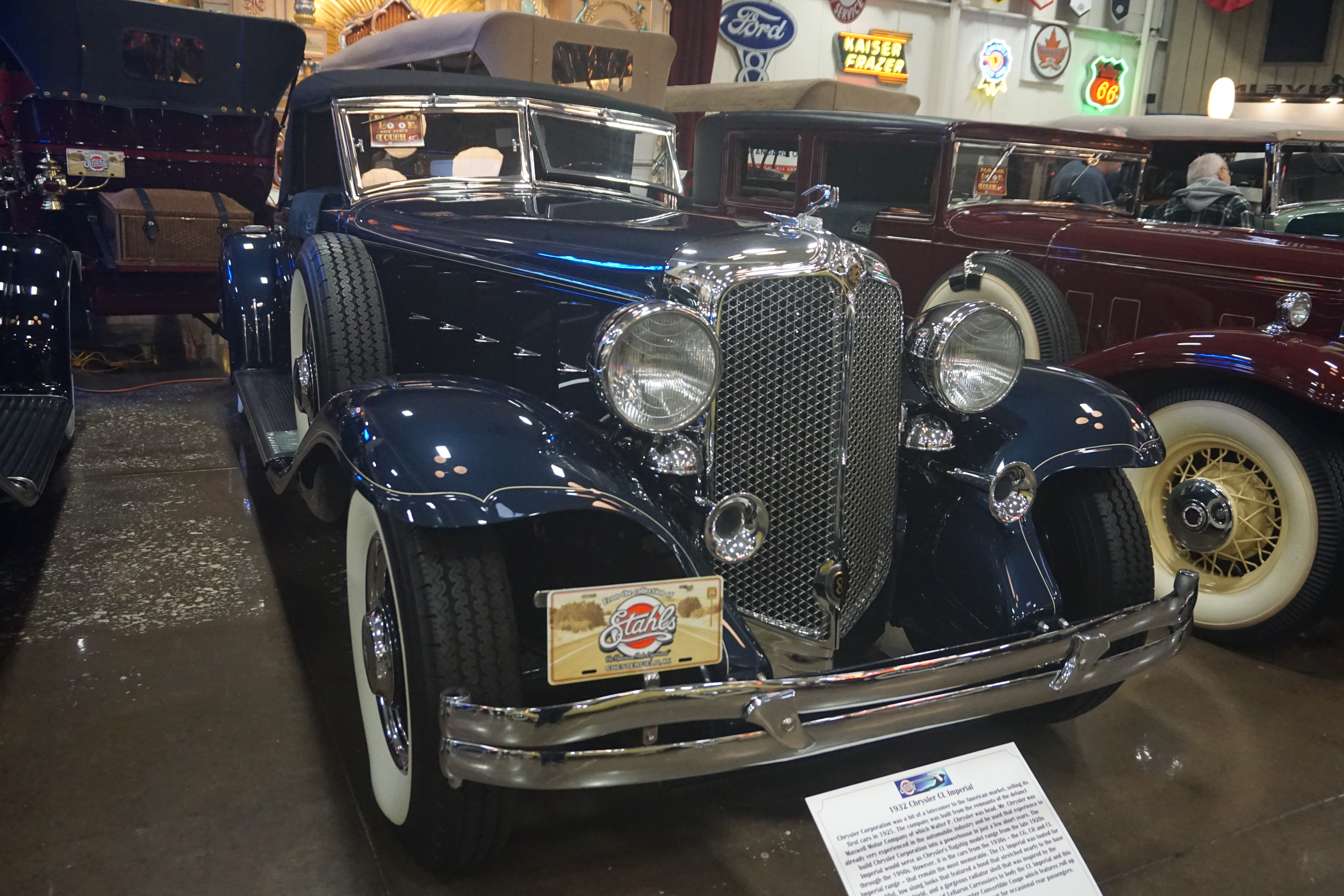
1932 Chrysler CL Imperial

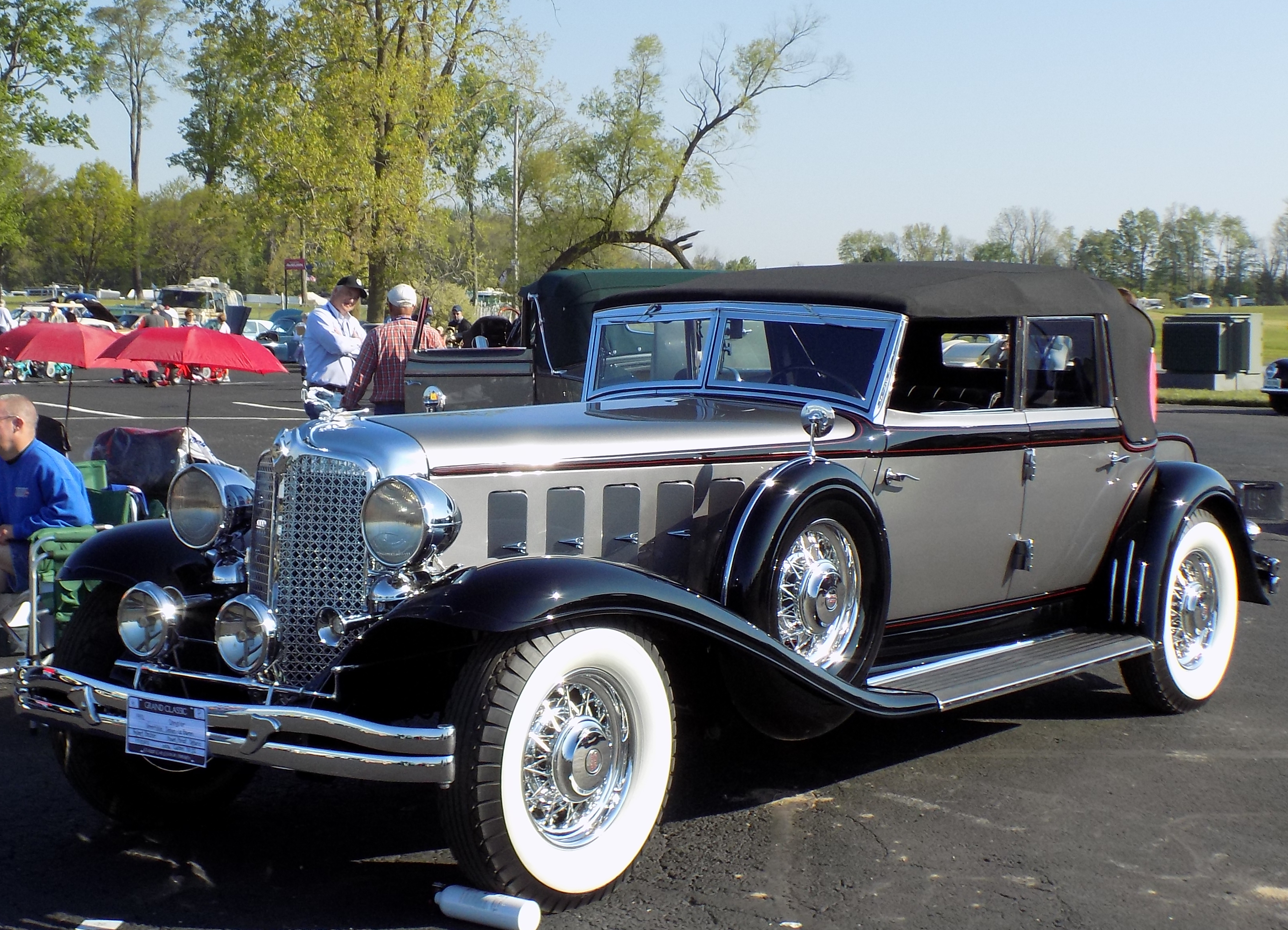
1932 Chrysler Imperial Custom Series CL Convertible Sedan by LeBaron

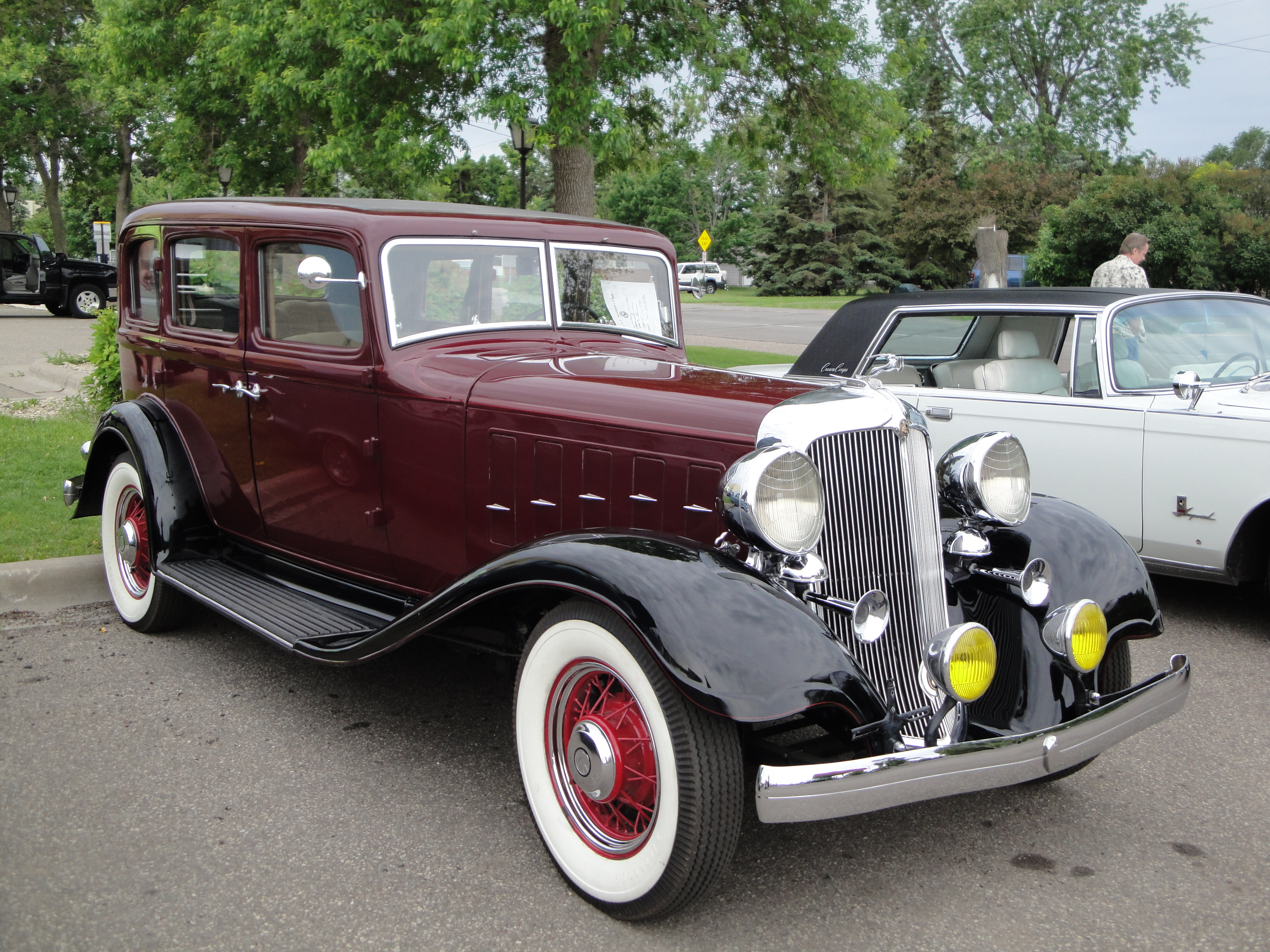
1933 Chrysler Imperial Series CQ Sedan by Briggs

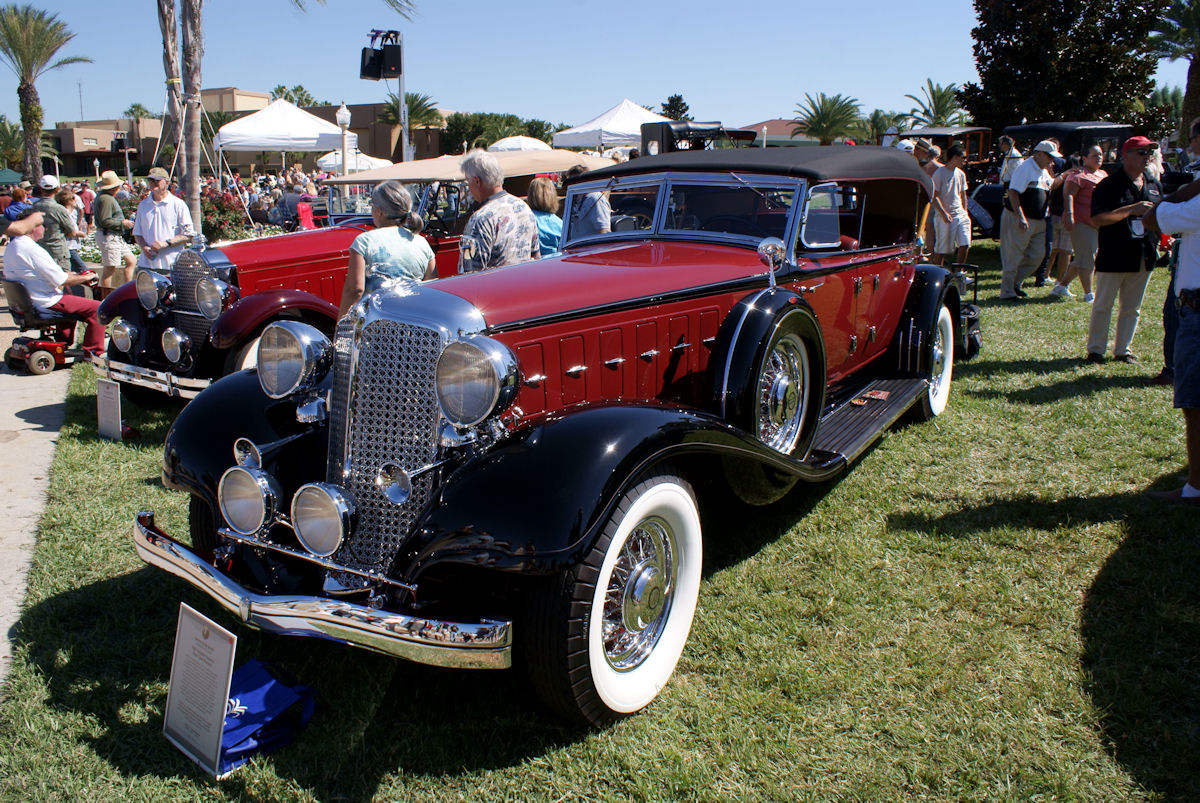
1933 Chrysler Imperial Custom Series CL Dual Cowl Phaeton by LeBaron

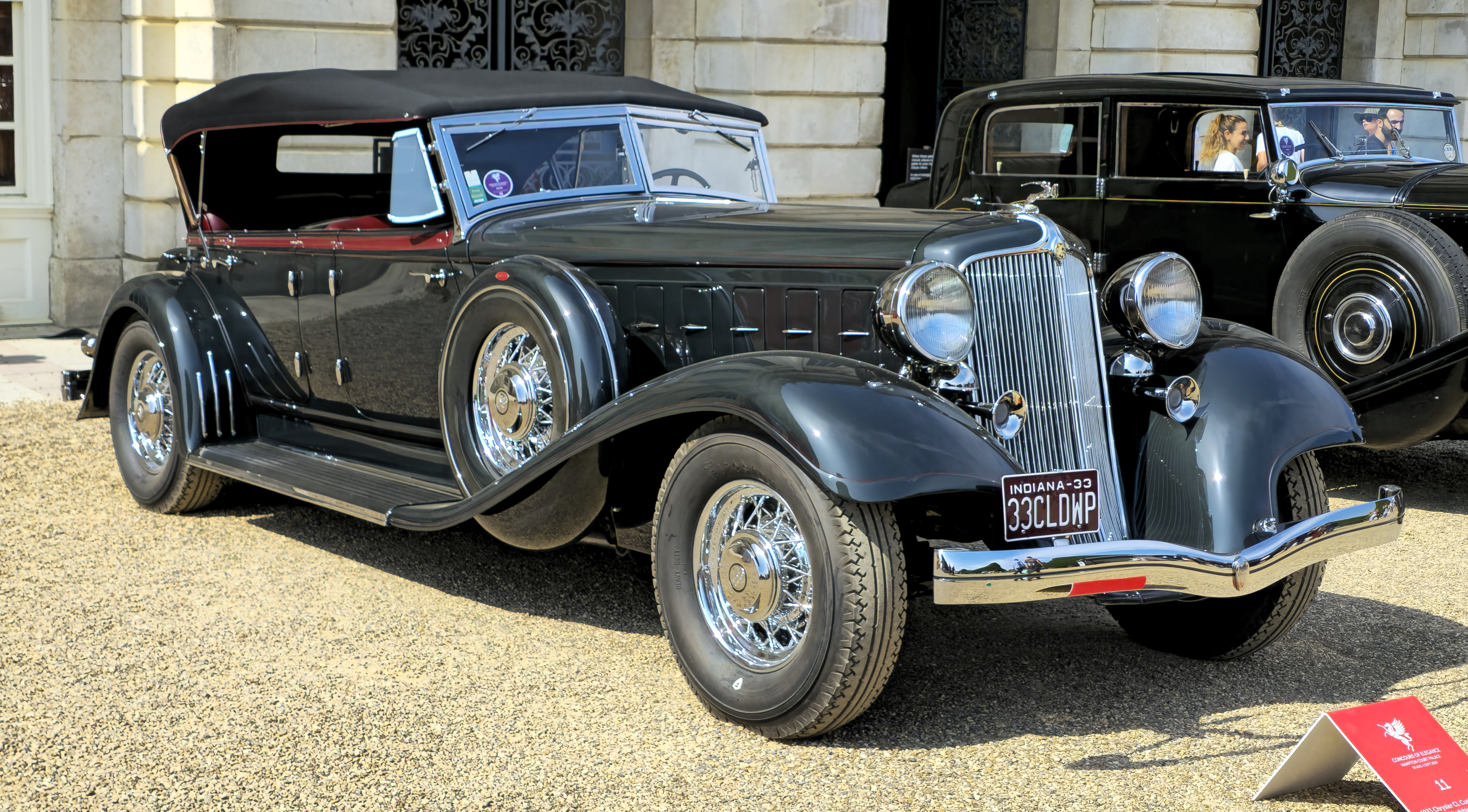
A 1933 Chrysler Imperial CL taken at Hampton Court Concours 2024

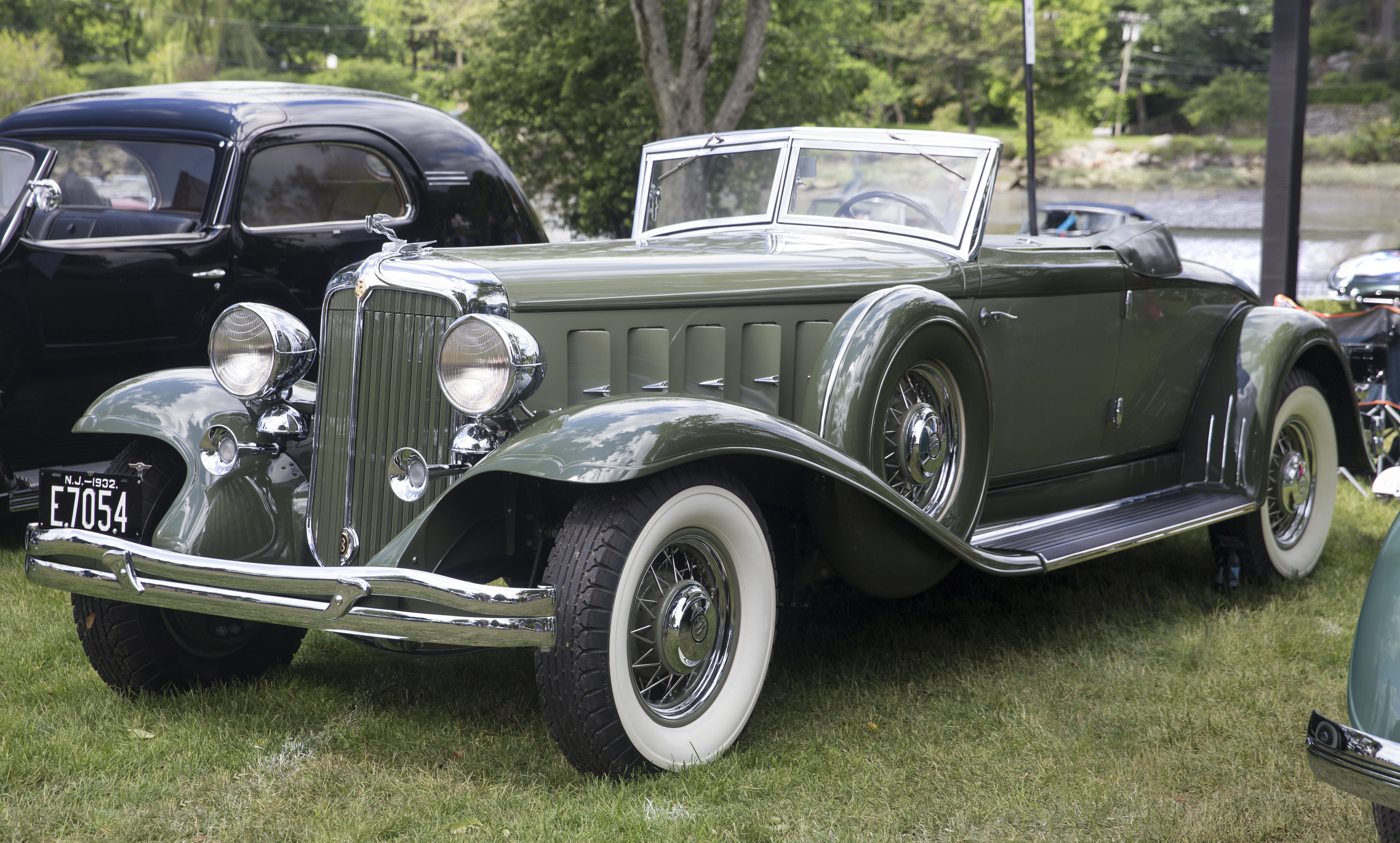
1932 Chrysler CL Imperial Convertible Coupe by LeBaron

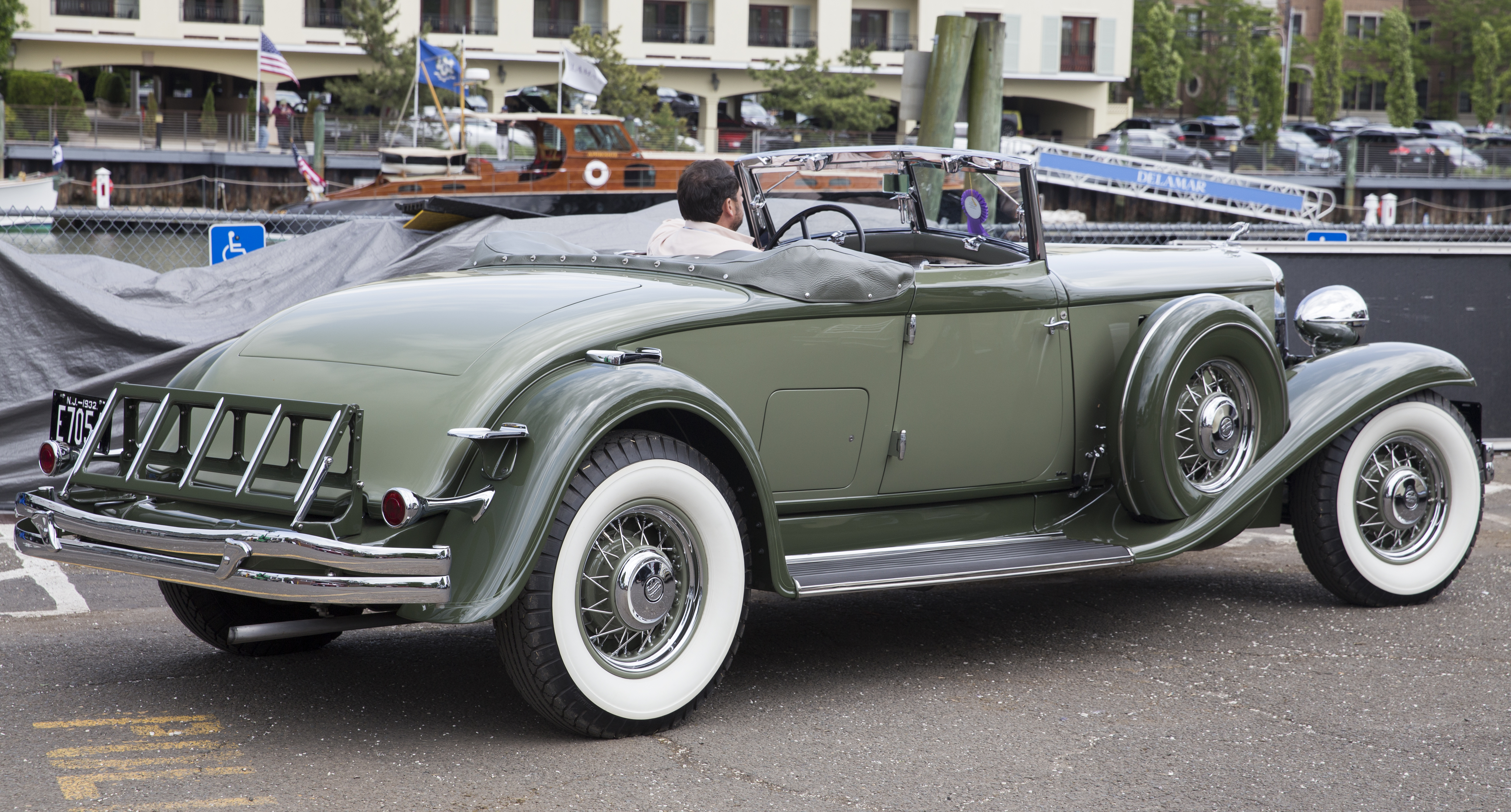
1932 Chrysler CL Imperial Convertible Coupe by LeBaron

== 1934–1936 ==
Series CV, CX, CW/C-2, C-3, CW/C-10, C-11, CW
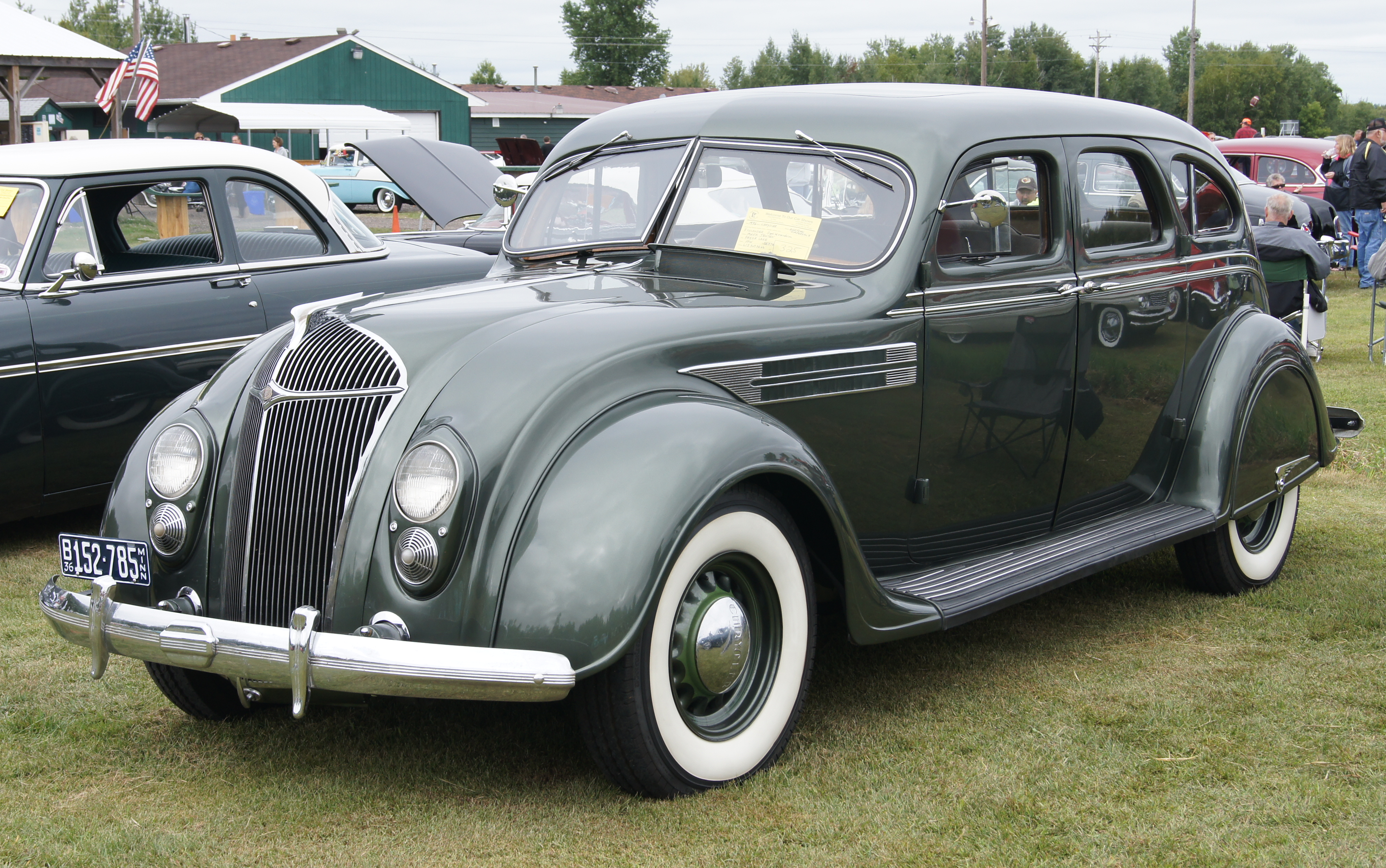
- 1936 Chrysler Imperial Series C-11 Airflow Sedan (showing base of passenger front window extended for ventilation)

Overview
- Production: 1934–1936
- Assembly: Highland Park, Michigan (Highland Park Chrysler Plant)

Body and chassis
- Body style: 2-door coupe 4-door sedan 4-door limousine
- Layout: FR layout
- Related: Chrysler Airflow; Chrysler Airstream; DeSoto Airflow; DeSoto Airstream

Powertrain
- Engine: 273.8 cu in (4.5 L) Chrysler Flathead I8; 323.5 cu in (5.3 L) Chrysler Flathead I8; 384.8 cu in (6.3 L) Chrysler Flathead I8 (Series CW)
- Transmission: 3-speed manual 4-speed manual w/overdrive

Dimensions
- Wheelbase: Imperial CV 128 in (3,251 mm) (1934–1936) Imperial CX 137.5 in (3,492 mm) (1934); Imperial CX 137 in (3,480 mm) (1935-1936) Imperial CW 146 in (3,708 mm) (1934); Imperial CW 146.5 in (3,721 mm) (1935–1936)

The Chrysler Imperial introduced in 1934 offered the "Airflow" design, reflecting an interest in streamlining. The car was marketed with the slogan "The car of tomorrow is here today." The 1934 Series CV featured eight-passenger seating and an eight-cylinder engine with additional optional features as standard equipment, including vacuum-assisted power brakes and a Stromberg two barrel carburetor Model EE-22. It was the first car to be designed in a wind tunnel. Initial tests indicated that the standard car of the 1920s worked best in the wind tunnel when pointed backwards with the curved rear deck facing forward. This led to a rethinking of the fundamental design of Chrysler's cars, with a primary focus on reducing wind noise inside the passenger compartment. Both engine and passenger compartment were moved forward, giving better balance and ride. An early form of unibody construction was employed, giving them a durability advantage in comparison to body on frame construction. It continued to offer a Chrysler engine vibration isolation feature called "Floating Power", and was one of the first automobiles to offer a one-piece curved windshield. Chrysler offered both the conventional Airstream models along with the Airflow models under the Chrysler marque, but only offered the Imperial marque with Airflow models.

The 1934 Imperial Airflow Series CV featured the 323.5 cu in (5.3 L) Chrysler flathead straight eight with an aluminum cylinder head and overdrive manual transmission. Body style choices were a two-door coupe, four-door sedan and four-door Town Sedan on a 128 in (3,251 mm) wheelbase, and were priced at US$1,625 ($39,109 in 2025 dollars). The longer wheelbase Imperial Custom Airflow Series CX offered only sedan choices, including Town Sedan and Limousine, on a 137.5 in (3,492 mm) wheelbase for US$2,345 ($56,437 in 2025 dollars). The top level Imperial Custom Airflow Series CW offered a four-door Sedan, Limousine, or Town Limousine for US$5,000 ($120,336 in 2025 dollars), using a 146.5 in (3,721 mm) wheelbase and the 384.8 cu in (6.3 L) Straight Eight. According to documented production numbers for 1934, 2,277 Series CV, 106 Series CX, and 67 Series CW were produced.

The public was put off by the unconventional styling, and the "Airstream" appearance on Chryslers outsold the "Airflow" by 3 to 1. The 1935 Imperial Airflow Series C-2 and Series C-3 were carried over from resources not used for 1934 due to underwhelming sales. The conventionally styled Chrysler Airstream, which replaced the Chrysler Series CA and Series CB, was better received. According to documented production numbers, 2,598 Series C-2 coupes and sedans were manufactured, while only 125 Series C-3 rolled off the assembly line, accounting for both coupe and sedan production. The top level Series CW recorded only 32 limousines that could accommodate eight passengers, offering four different coachwork choices for a minimum listed price of US$5,000 ($117,415 in 2025 dollars).

1936 was the last year for the "Airflow" style, with certain enhancements and features added to entice buyers. A new grille, all-steel roof construction, and a luggage compartment were added. The wheelbase was lengthened, as were the doors and side windows. The one-piece front windshield was either split or curved on the Imperial Custom, and continued to be extendable from the base outwards while a separate retractable cowl ventilator remained to provide fresh air inside the passenger compartment. Production numbers continued to fall to a total of 4,500 Series C-10 sedans and coupes and 75 Series C-11 sedans and limousines. A total of 10 Series CW were sold, while the actual manufacture dates were previous years that were registered, and dated as 1936 models. The pricing structure was simplified as US$1,475 ($34,637 in 2025 dollars) for the Series C-10 for the coupe or sedan, and US$2,475 ($58,120 in 2025 dollars) for the Series C-11 sedan or limousine. While 1936 was Chrysler's most profitable year since 1929, the Airflow program was cancelled. Today, the Imperial Custom Airflows are recognized as classics by the Classic Car Club of America.

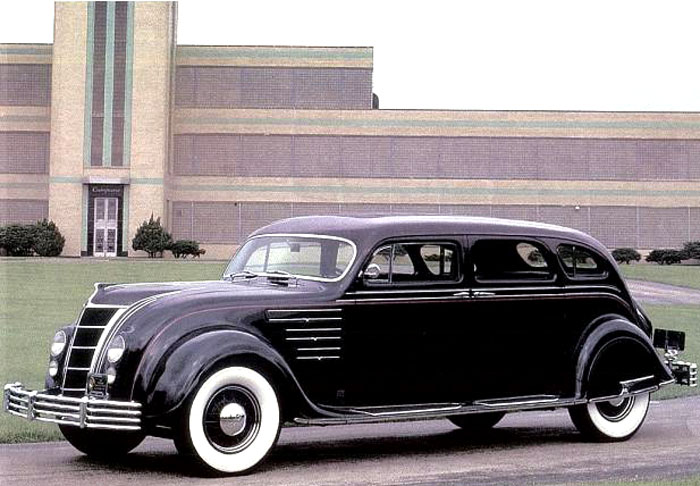
1934 Chrysler Imperial Series CX Airflow Limousine

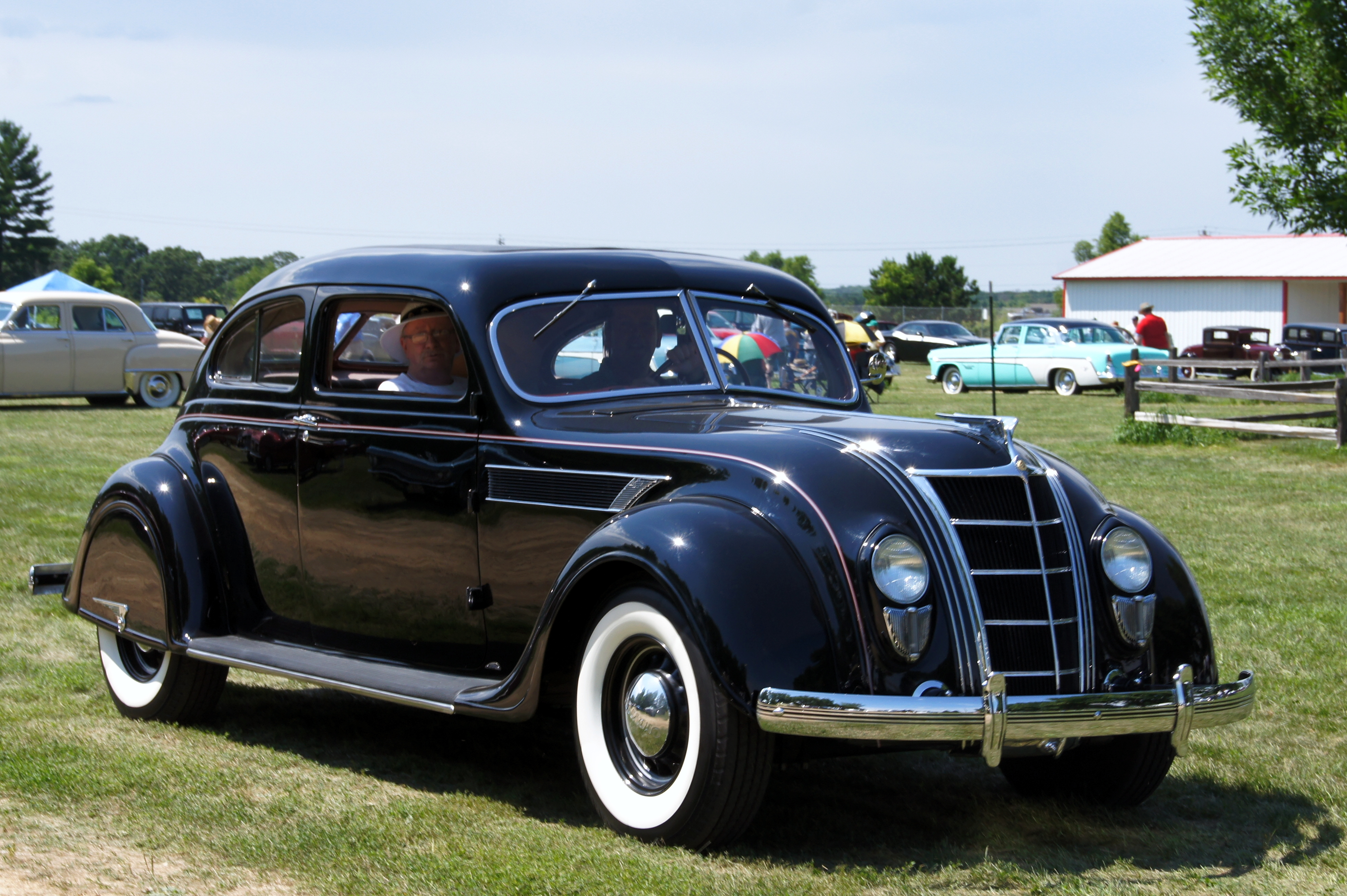
1935 Chrysler Imperial Series C-2 Coupe

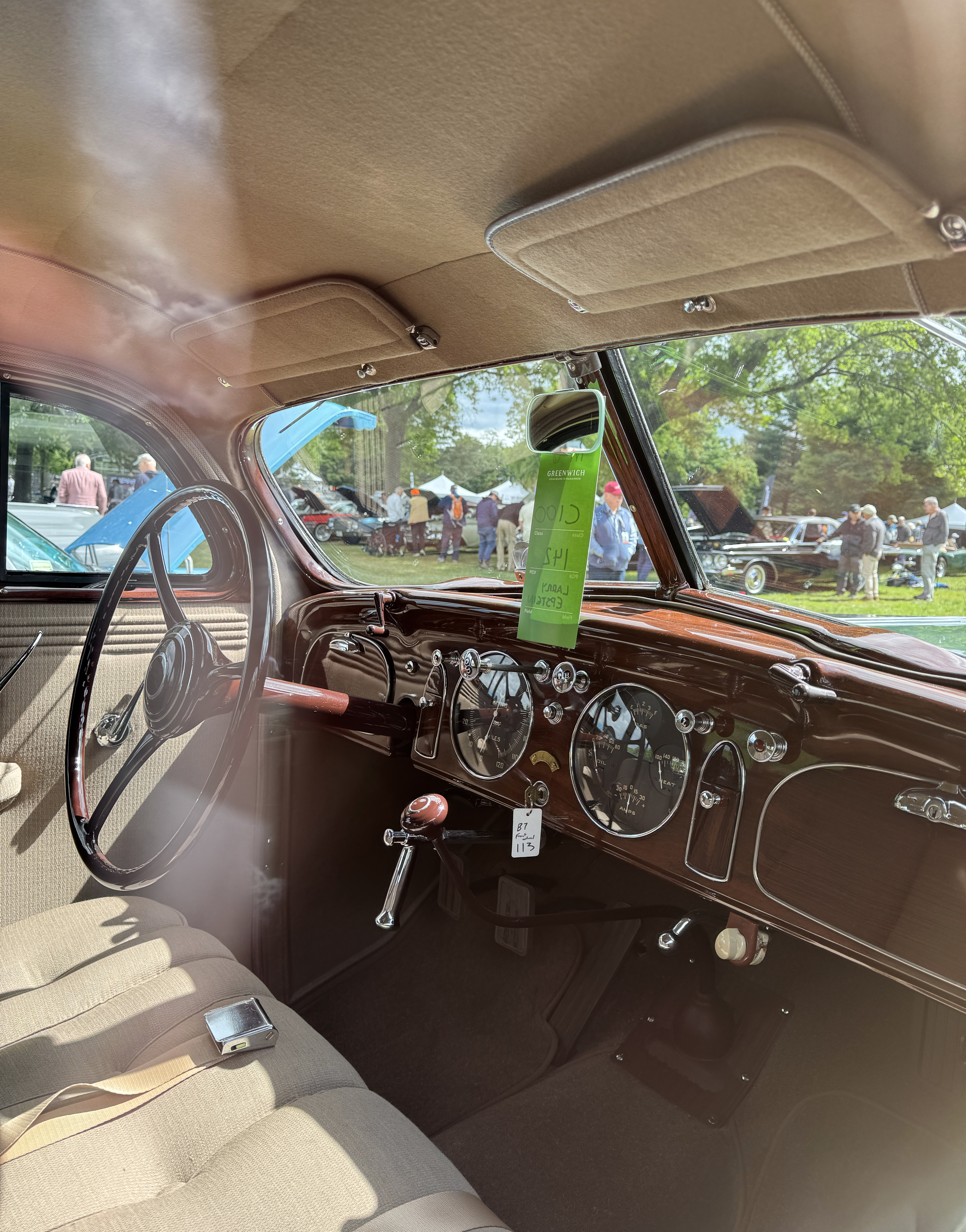
The interior of a 1935 Chrysler Imperial Airflow Coupe C-2

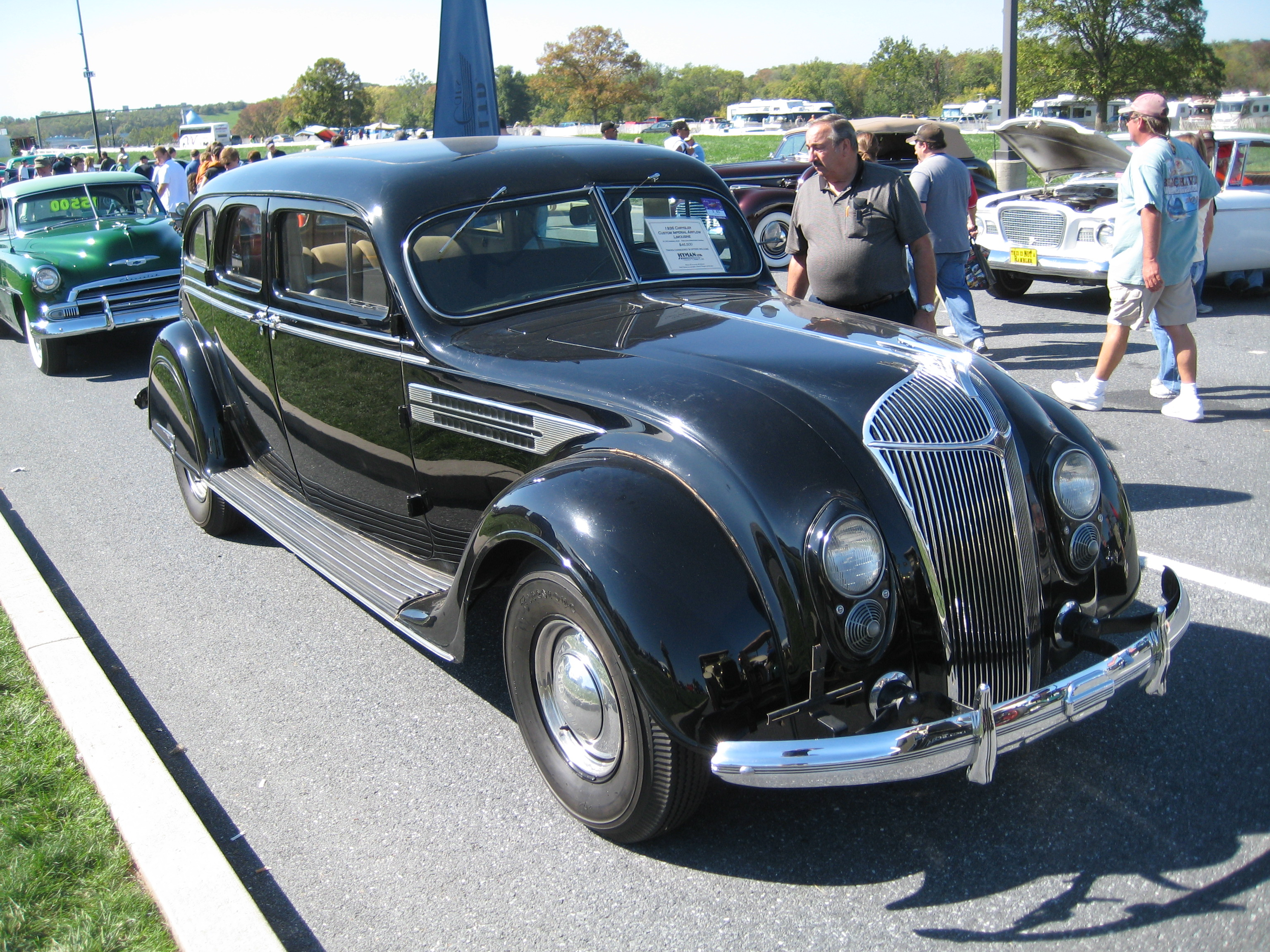
1936 Chrysler Imperial Custom Series C-11 Airflow Sedan

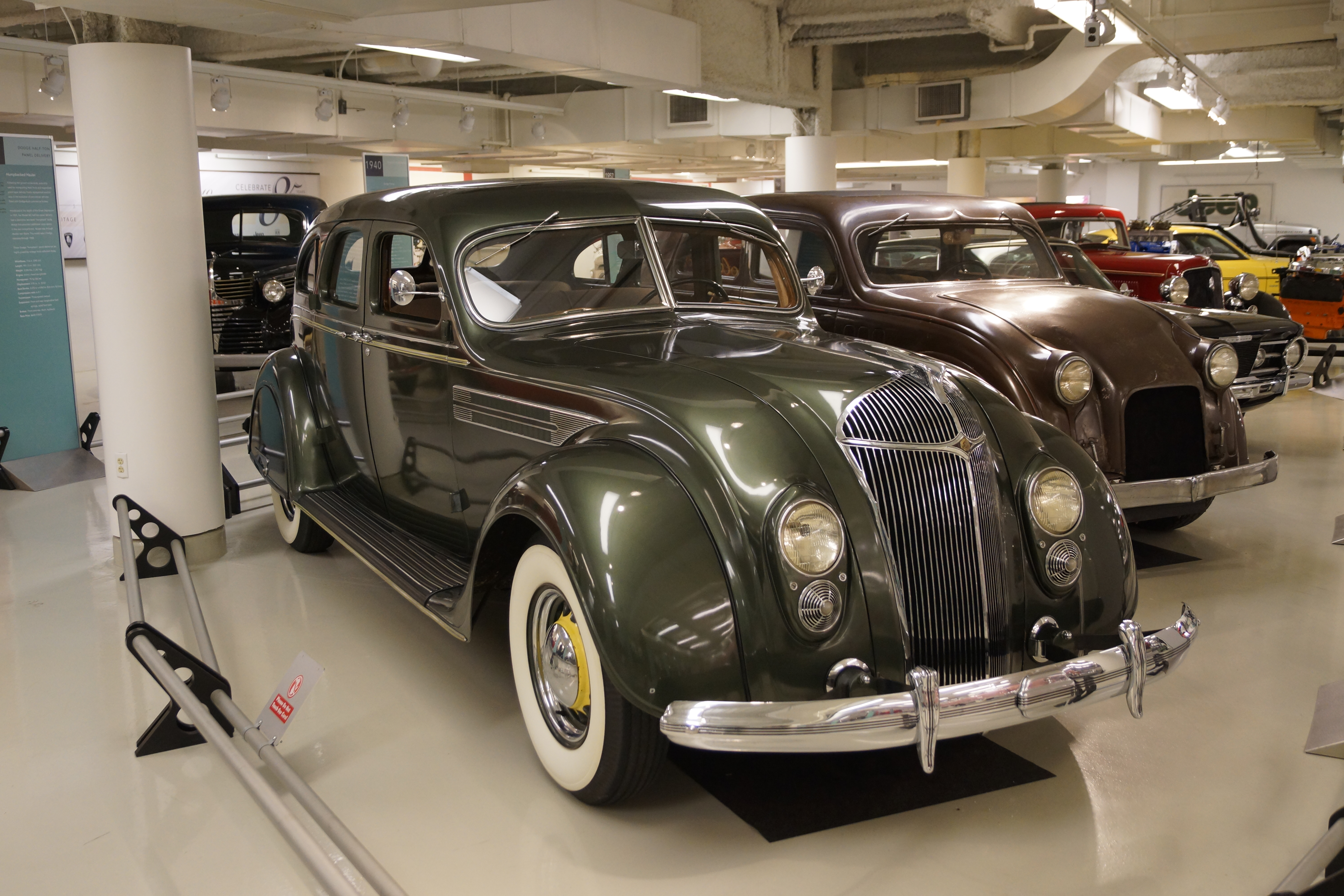
1936 Chrysler Imperial Series C-10 Airflow Sedan

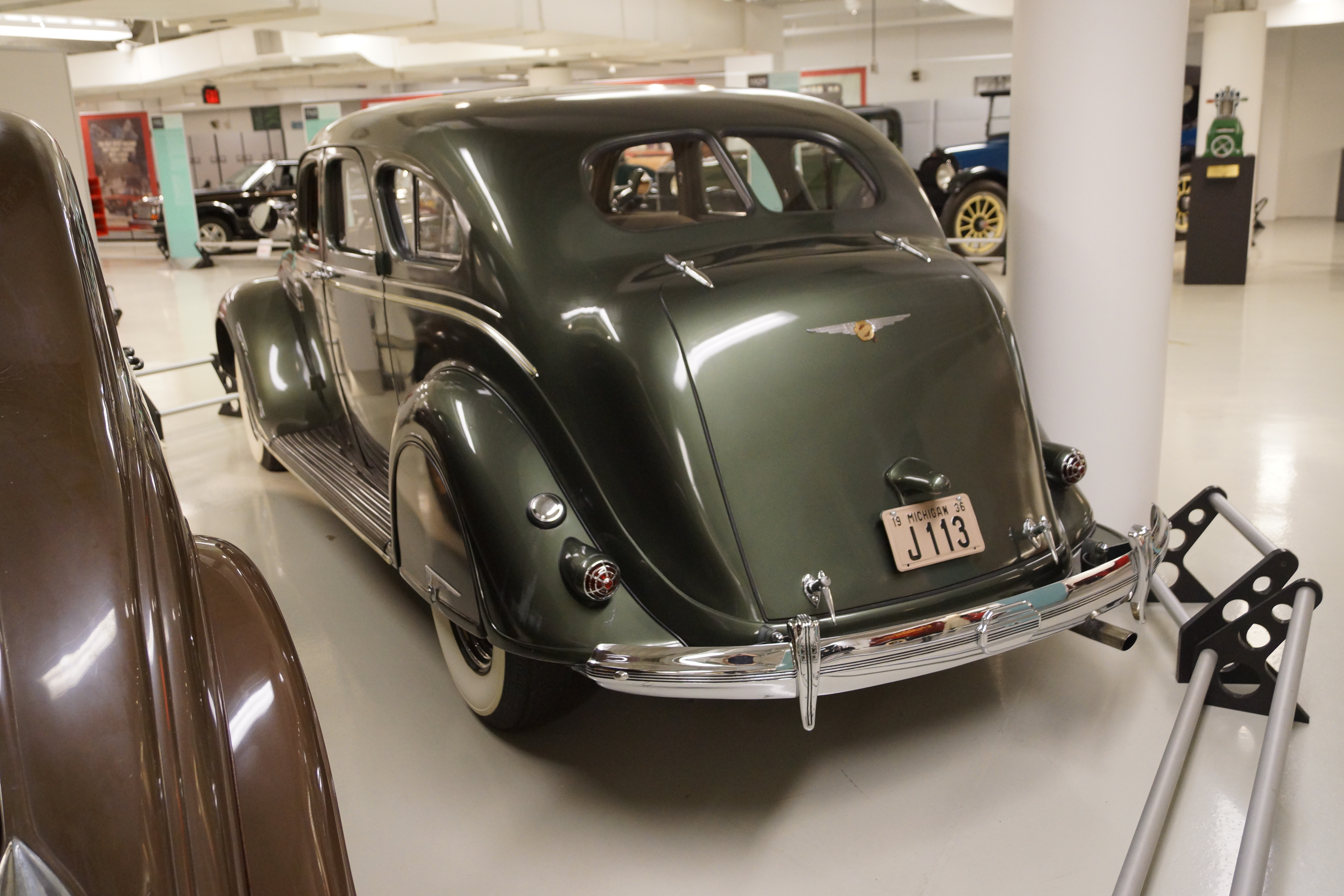
1936 Chrysler Imperial Series C-10 Airflow Sedan

== 1937–1939 ==
Series C-14, C-15, CW/C-19, C-20/C-23, C-24
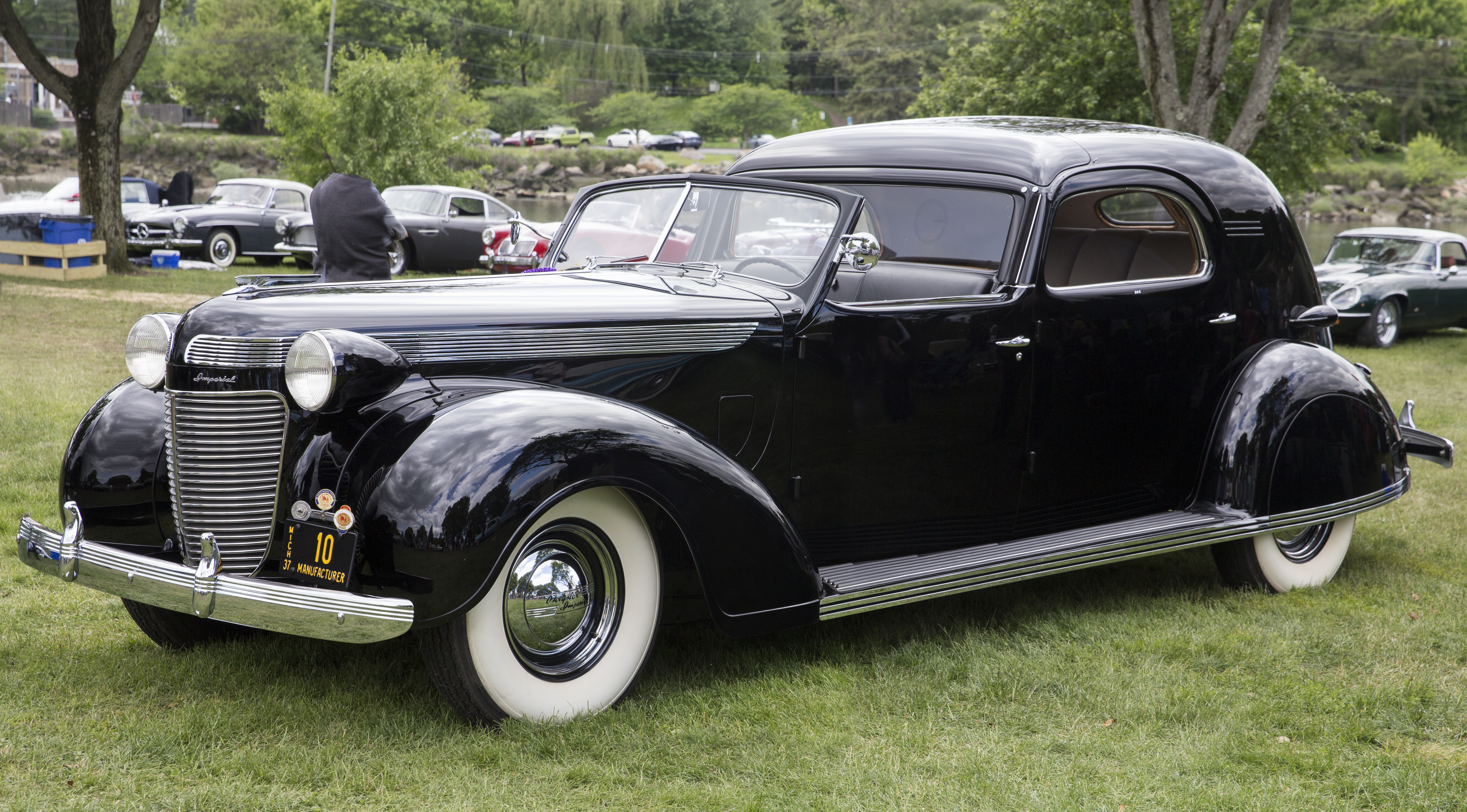
- 1937 Chrysler Imperial Custom Series C-15 Town Car (originally ordered by Walter P. Chrysler)

Overview
- Production: 1937–1939
- Assembly: Detroit, Michigan (Jefferson Avenue Assembly)

Body and chassis
- Body style: 4-door sedan 4-door limousine
- Layout: FR layout
- Related: Chrysler Saratoga; Chrysler New Yorker

Powertrain
- Engine: 273.8 cu in (4.5 L) Chrysler I8; 323.5 cu in (5.3 L) Chrysler I8 384.4 cu in (6.3 L) Chrysler I8 (Series CW)
- Transmission: 3-speed synchromesh manual w/Fluid Drive

Dimensions
- Wheelbase: 121 in (3,073 mm); 125 in (3,175 mm); 140 in (3,556 mm); 144 in (3,658 mm); 146.5 in (3,721 mm)
- Length: 1937 204.75 in (5,201 mm) (Imperial); 223.25 in (5,671 mm) (Imperial Custom)
- Curb weight: 3,450–3,835 lb (1,565–1,740 kg)(1938)

After Chrysler reverted to body on frame construction, three models in this generation were designated as Imperial. The polarizing appearance was modified with a return to "torpedo" styling, sharing the appearance of a long, straight hood and cowl and moving the headlights outwards into the front fenders with the more successful "Airstream" appearance. The Series C-14 offered the straight eight, shared with the Chrysler Royal C-16. The Series C-15 was the Imperial Custom and the Town Sedan Limousine with blind rear quarter panels, and was available on request. The top level Imperial Custom Series CW continued to be offered, but was very exclusive, using a 146.5 in (3,721 mm) wheelbase while eliminating the "Airflow" nameplate. Innovations for 1937 included built-in defroster vents, safety-type interior hardware (such as flexible door handles and recessed controls on the dash), seat-back padding, and fully insulated engine mounts. Brakes were 13-inch drums that expanded to 14 inches in 1939 but shrunk to 12 inches in 1940. Front suspension was independent. Unusually for ventilation, it had a concealed crank to extend the base of the split windshield outward. The top edge of the engine hood was hinged at the cowl, and opened from the grille and up. Access to the engine was accommodated with side hood panels that were released by catches on the inside. An Imperial Custom Series C-15 Convertible Sedan by Derham was used as the official car of the American Automobile Association at the 1937 Indianapolis 500, and was painted silver and black to celebrate the racetrack's 25th anniversary.

According to documented records, 11,976 Series C-14 Touring Sedans were produced at a listed price of US$1,100 ($24,635 in 2025 dollars). While the Imperial Custom Series CW was offered in its final year for 1937, documentation does not record that one was built, while three 1937 Series CW were recorded to have been updated with 1936 appearance features and LeBaron bodywork. The first one was built for the Hershey family, who had an antique car collection, now called the AACA Museum in Hershey, Pennsylvania. The second Series CW was built for Manuel L. Quezon, the first president of the Spanish Commonwealth of the Philippines, and is maintained by the government. The third car was built for radio personality Major Edward Bowes, which later joined a car collection of Frank Kleptz of Terre Haute, Indiana. A 1940 article in Life magazine quoted the value of Major Bowes' car at US$25,000 ($574,525 in 2025 dollars). According to records,s the car returned to Chrysler in 1941 after the death of Mr. Bowe. It was allegedly repainted black from the original Brewster Green and put into wartime service in 1942, used by Admiral Chester Nimitz as a staff car.

For 1938, the Series C-19 was shared with the Imperial and the new New York Special, which became the New Yorker in 1939. While the New York Special was offered as a Business Coupe (of which no records show none were ordered and built) and a four-door Touring Sedan, the Series C-19 was offered in six body choices, and the chassis was available separately for additional coachwork selections. Three convertible choices, including a two-door roadster with rumble seat and a four-door convertible, were listed between US$1,123 ($25,686 in 2025 dollars) and US$1,595 ($36,918 in 2025 dollars). The Imperial Custom offered three factory coachwork choices and five custom choices provided by Derham to include two convertible and two Town Car Limousines. The Imperial Custom Series CW was no longer offered. According to documented records, 8,554 Series C-19 Touring Sedans were produced at a listed price of US$1,198 ($27,401 in 2025 dollars).

For 1939, model names and series numbers were updated. C-23 was shared by the Imperial, the New Yorker, and the Saratoga. The straight eight was shared with all three, and an aluminum cylinder head was optional on the high compression engine. Visual distinctions could be found in the interior fabrics, the number of chrome pieces in the grille, and nameplate badges installed. A Victoria coachwork choice, provided by Hayes Body Company, was offered for the Imperial, along with either a two-door Business Coupe or five-passenger Brougham Coupe and a four-door sedan. The top level Series C-24 offered three factory provided sedans, including a limousine, or three convertible bodystyle choices from Derham. The listed price was US$2,695 ($62,378 in 2025 dollars). One of three Imperial Custom Convertible Town Cars by Derham was specially built for King George VI and Queen Elizabeth's 1939 royal tour of Canada, during their visit to the United States. This car was then donated to the Detroit American Legion post.

An armored Chrysler Imperial was purchased as the official car for António de Oliveira Salazar, Prime Minister of Portugal, following a 1937 assassination attempt.

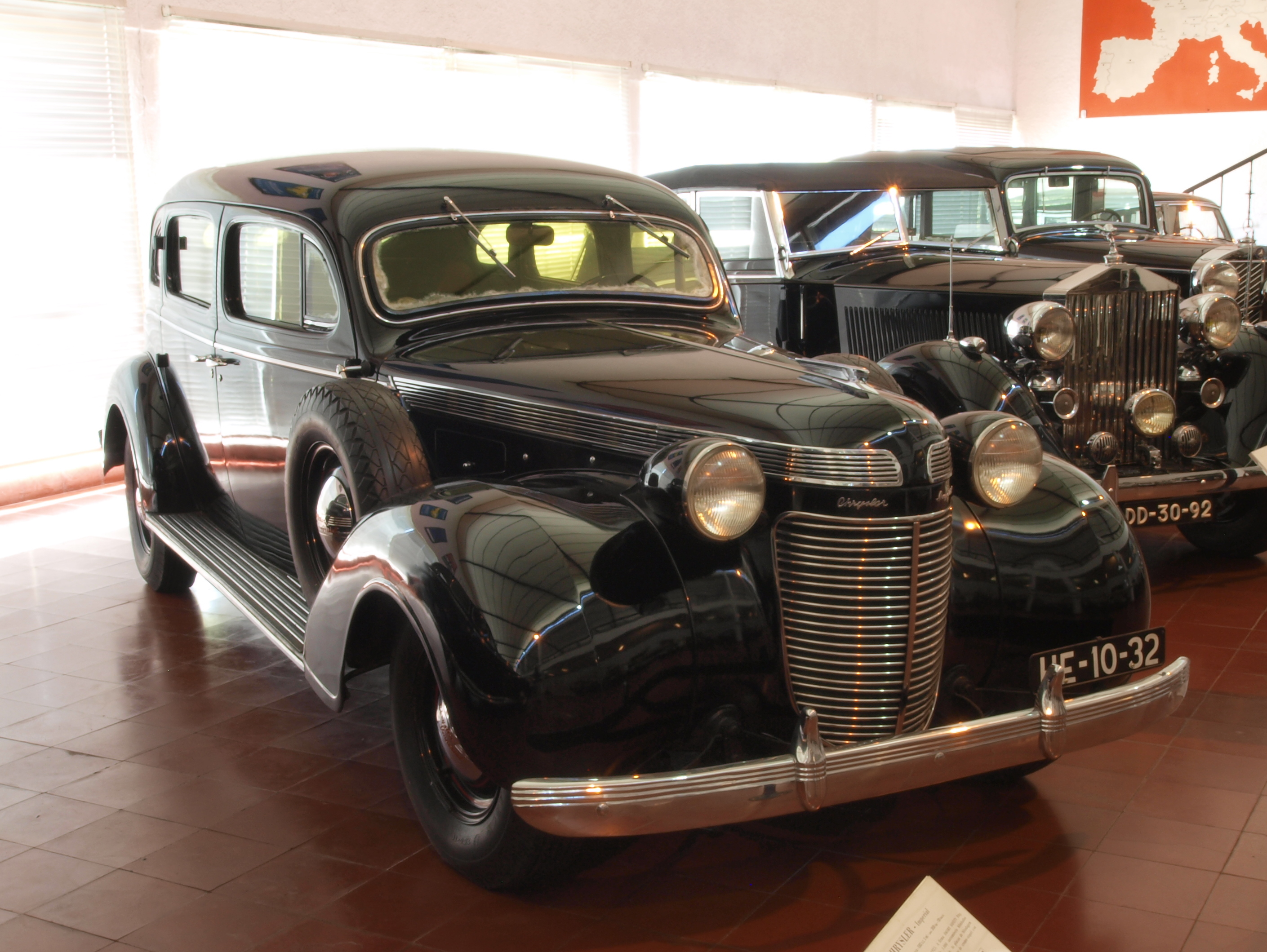
1937 Chrysler Imperial Series C-14 Touring Sedan

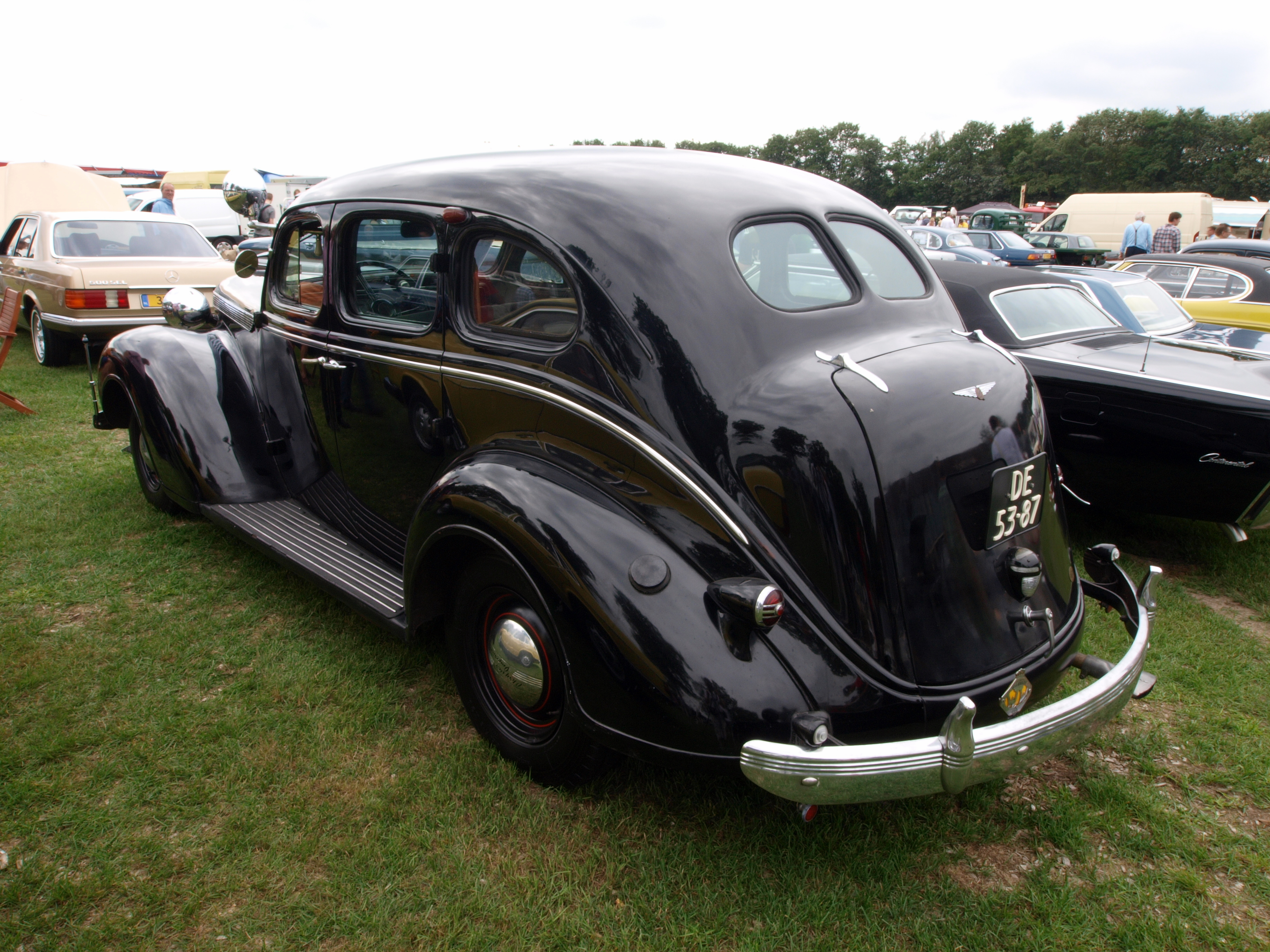
1937 Chrysler Imperial Series C-14 Touring Sedan

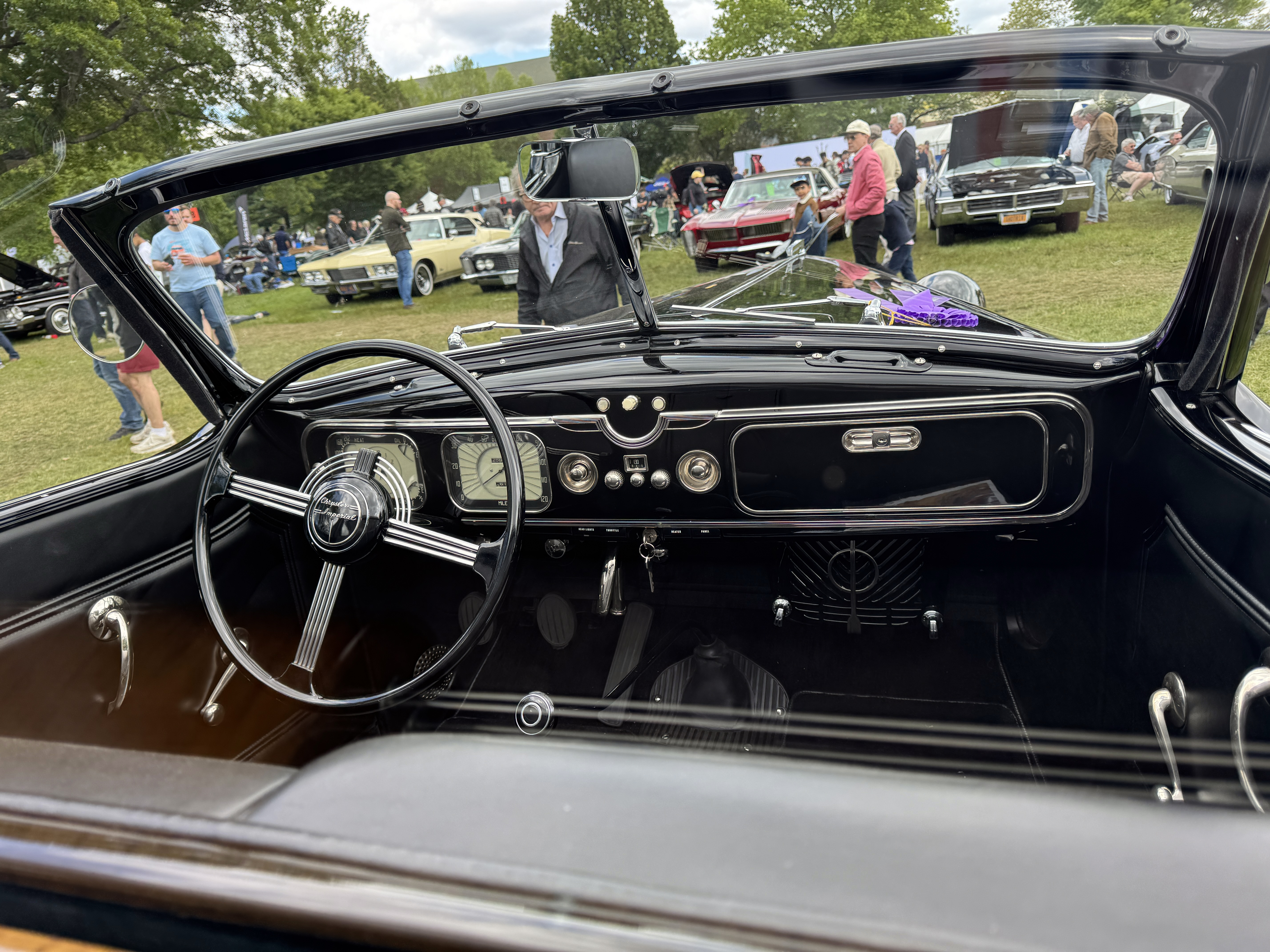
The driver's front seat interior of 1937 Chrysler Imperial C-15 Town Car

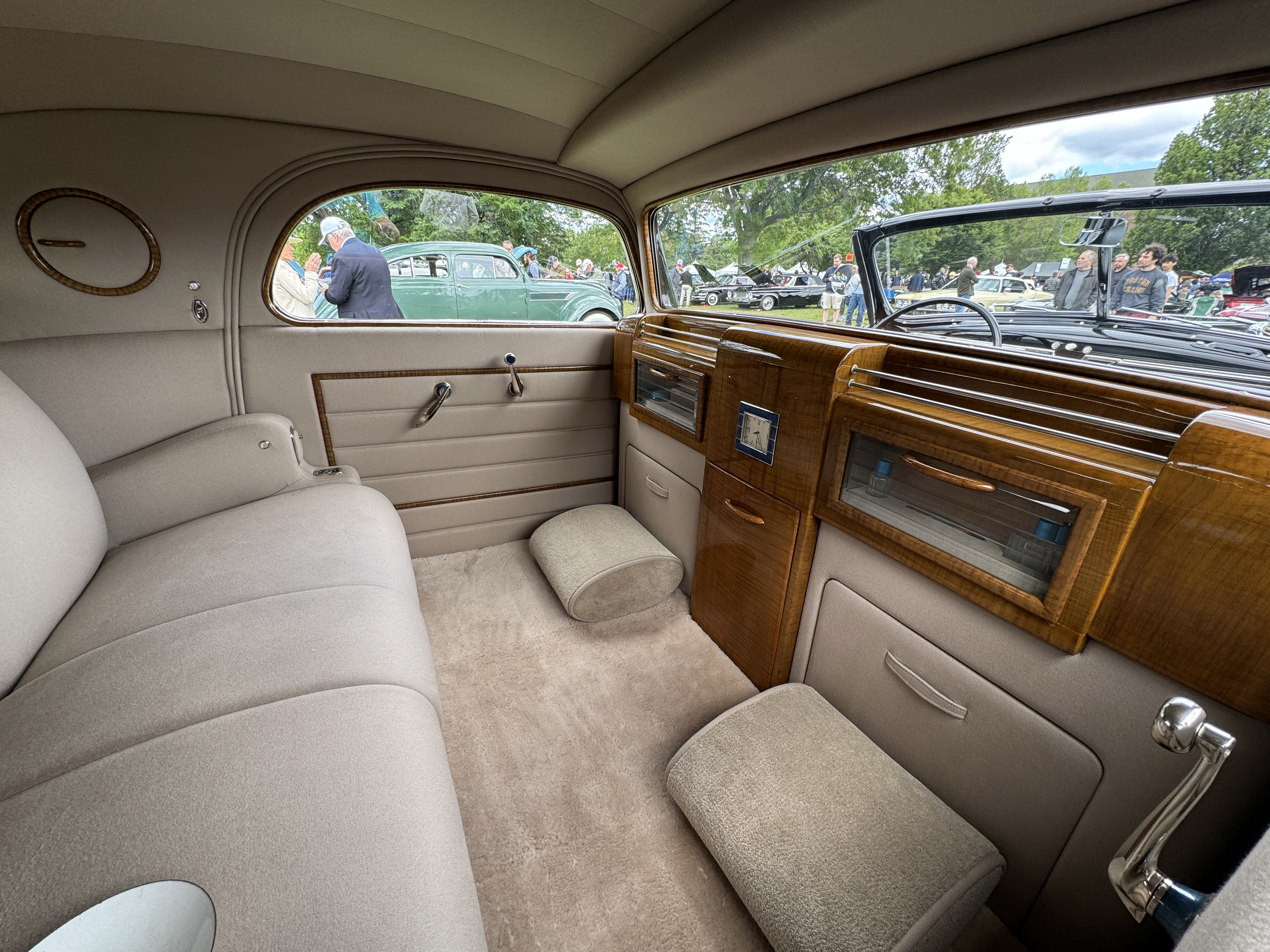
1937 Chrysler Imperial C-15 Town Car interior

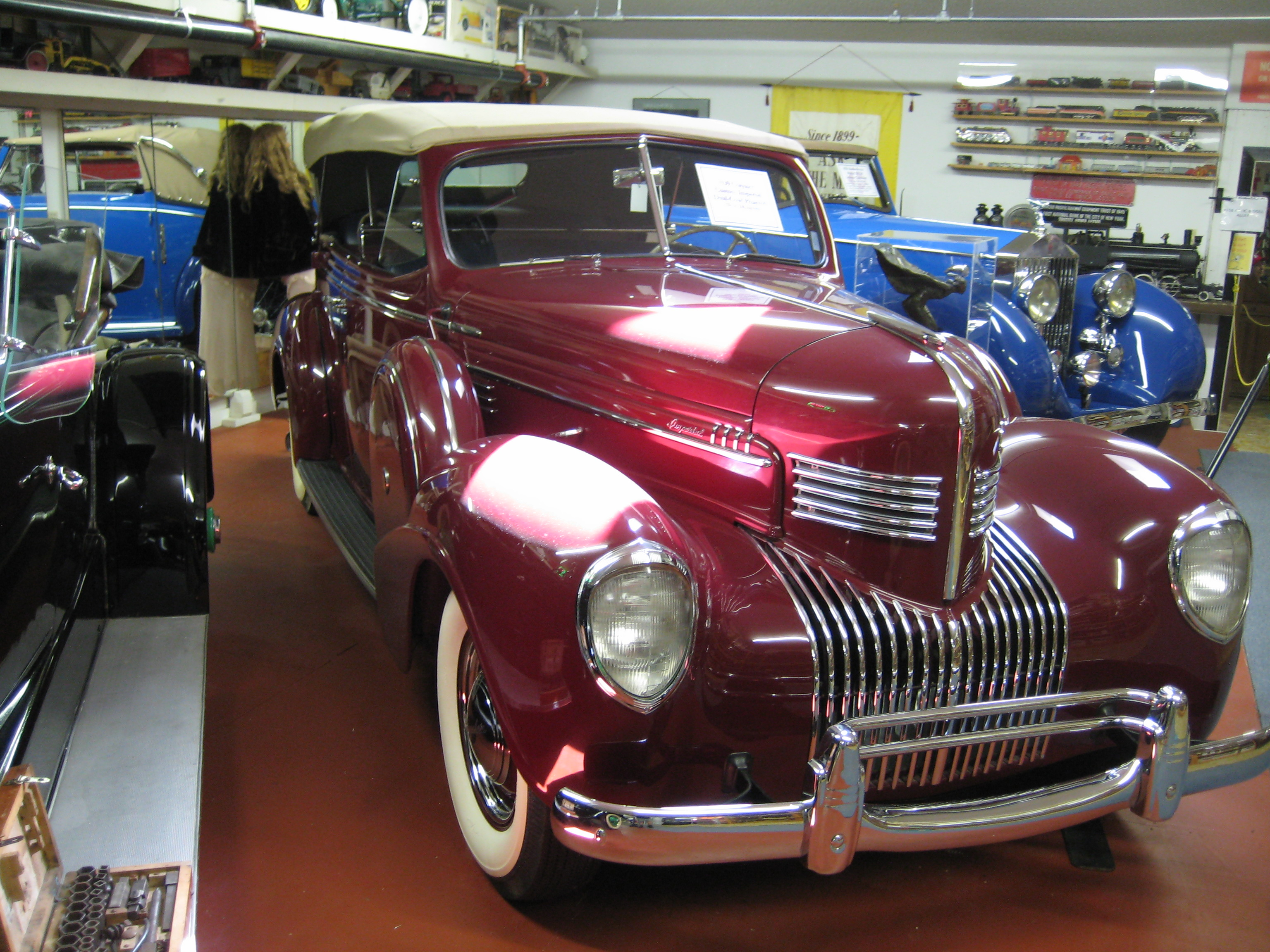
1939 Chrysler Imperial Custom Series C-24 Town Phaeton by Derham

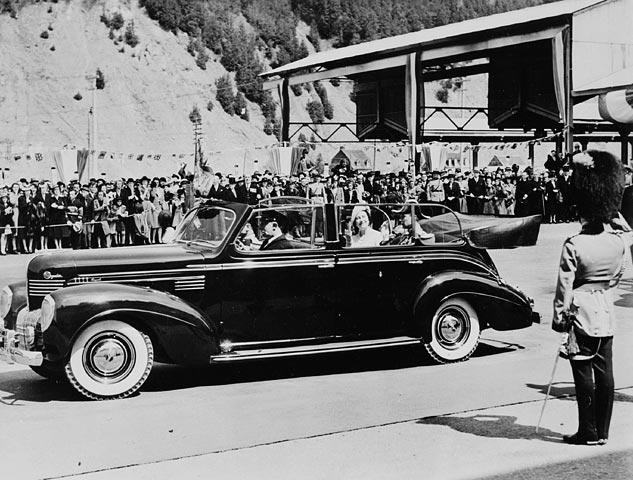
1939 Chrysler Imperial Custom Convertible Town Car by Derham transporting the King and Queen of England

== 1940–1948 ==
Series C-27/C-33/C-37/C-40

Overview
- Production: 1940–1948
- Assembly: Detroit, Michigan (Jefferson Avenue Assembly)

Body and chassis
- Body style: 4-door sedan 4-door limousine
- Layout: FR layout
- Related: Chrysler Saratoga; Chrysler New Yorker; Chrysler Windsor; Chrysler Town & Country; Chrysler Newport Phaeton

Powertrain
- Engine: 323.5 cu in (5.3 L) Chrysler I8
- Transmission: 3-speed manual transmission with Fluid Drive w/overdrive Vacamatic 3-speed semi-automatic

Dimensions
- Wheelbase: 145.5 in (3,696 mm)
- Length: 1940 225.25 in (5,721 mm); 235 in (5,969 mm)
- Width: 77.8 in (1,976 mm)
- Curb weight: 3,900–4,560 lb (1,769–2,068 kg)(1941)

In 1940, the Imperial Crown Series C-27 was the only vehicle to wear the Imperial nameplate, and was offered in four body styles: a six-passenger Sedan, an eight-passenger Sedan, an eight-passenger Limousine, and the six-passenger Derham Parade Phaeton. The styling was shared with all Chrysler models for that year, and offered front fender parking lights with conventional running boards. Identification of a Chrysler model was limited to a nameplate attached on the front fender just below the engine hood, along with interior upholstery and standard features installed that were optional on other models. The six-passenger sedan offered storage compartments in the front seatbacks and foot rests, while the eight-passenger sedan replaced the storage compartments with accommodation for storing the retractable jump seats and no foot rests. The limousine offered a retractable glass partition between the driver and passenger compartment, installing leather seating for the driver and wool upholstery for the passenger compartment. Lockheed hydraulic brakes and two-speed electric windshield wipers were standard. The listed price for the limousine was US$2,695 ($61,934 in 2025 dollars).

The 1941 Imperial Crown Series C-33 remained exclusive and special models were available. The Imperial Special Town Sedan used the shorter New Yorker chassis with an Imperial Crown nameplate, with a listed price of US$1,675 ($38,525 in 2025 dollars). Laidlaw interior fabrics, Goodyear Double Eagle Tires installed on "Safety Rim" pressed steel wheels, and hydroelectric power windows lifts were some of the items installed. The body work appearance was shared with Chrysler products for 1941 and 1942. The only Series C-33 Imperial Crown chassis, with Derham-supplied body work, was recorded to be used for an Imperial Custom landaulet limousine for Briggs Manufacturing Company president Walter O. Briggs.

The 1942 production year was brief, and the New Yorker replaced most of the Imperial product line. The newly designated Imperial Crown Series C-37 was the only product to wear the Imperial nameplate. Derham continued to build custom limousines, town cars, and four-door convertibles using the Series C-37 designation, listing the limousine at US$3,065 ($60,395 in 2025 dollars). As with all U.S.-built automobiles, production was suspended in February 1942 due to World War II production demands, and did not resume until the 1946 model year.

When Chrysler discontinued the Imperial model name, the name was used for top-level Cadillac Series 70 limousines from 1941 to 1946, when the Imperial Crown limousine returned. The 1946 Imperial Crown continued the tradition of sharing a common appearance with all Chrysler branded vehicles and could be distinguished by the 145.5 in (3,696 mm) wheelbase, wool broadcloth upholstery for rear passengers with leather upholstery for the drivers divider window separated front compartment and other standard luxury features. According to production records, only 165 Series C-40 vehicles were built at a price of US$3,875 ($63,977 in 2025 dollars), with its competitors being the Cadillac Series 75 Fleetwood and the Packard Custom Super Clipper. 1947 saw increased production at 740 despite an increase in price to US$4,305 ($62,073 in 2025 dollars), with no appearance or feature changes. 1948 saw a drop in production to 495 and a price of US$4,767 ($68,734 in 2025 dollars).

== 1949–1954 ==
Series C-46N & C-47/C-49N & C-50/C-53 & C-54/C-58 & C-59/C-64 & C-66
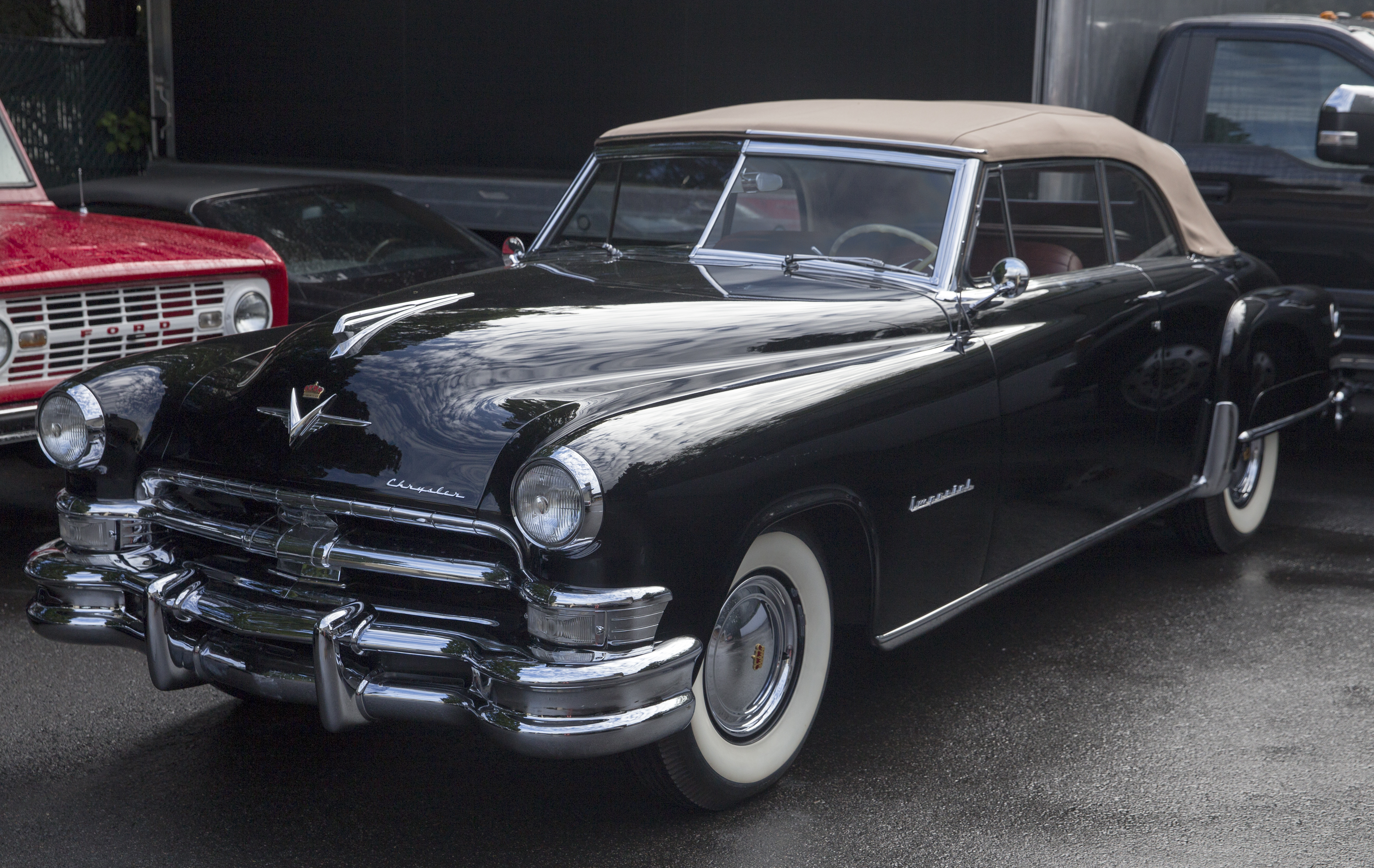
- 1951 Chrysler Imperial Convertible Coupe

Overview
- Model years: 1949–1954
- Assembly: Jefferson Avenue Assembly; Detroit, Michigan (starting 1948); Los Angeles (Maywood) Assembly; Los Angeles, California
- Designer: K.T. Keller

Body and chassis
- Body style: 2-door Club coupe 2-door hardtop 2-door Newport hardtop 2-door convertible 4-door sedan 4-door Imperial Custom limousine 4-door Imperial Crown sedan 4-door Imperial Crown limousine
- Layout: FR layout
- Related: Chrysler Imperial Parade Phaeton; Chrysler New Yorker; Chrysler Windsor; Chrysler Town and Country; Chrysler Saratoga

Powertrain
- Engine: 324 cu in (5.3 L) Spitfire I8; 331 cu in (5.4 L) FirePower V8
- Transmission: 4-speed Presto-Matic semiautomatic; 2-speed PowerFlite automatic

Dimensions
- Wheelbase: 1951: 131.5 in (3,340 mm); 1953–54 4-door: 133.5 in (3,391 mm); Imperial Crown : 144.5 in (3,670 mm)
- Length: Imperial and Imperial Custom: 1949: 210.0 in (5,334 mm); 1950: 214.0 in (5,436 mm); 1951: 212.5 in (5,398 mm); 1952: 212.6 in (5,400 mm); 1953 4-door: 219.0 in (5,563 mm); 1953 2-door: 217.0 in (5,512 mm); 1954 4-door: 223.8 in (5,685 mm); 1954 2-door: 221.8 in (5,634 mm); Imperial Crown : 1949: 234.8 in (5,964 mm); 1950: 230.3 in (5,850 mm); 1951–52: 229.5 in (5,829 mm); 1953: 231.6 in (5,883 mm); 1954: 236.4 in (6,005 mm)
- Width: Imperial and Imperial Custom: 1949–52: 75.8 in (1,925 mm); 1953: 76.8 in (1,951 mm); 1954: 77.8 in (1,976 mm); Imperial Crown: 1949–52: 80.9 in (2,055 mm); 1953: 81.9 in (2,080 mm); 1954: 82.9 in (2,106 mm)
- Height: 4-door: 63.0 in (1,600 mm); 2-door: 64.4 in (1,636 mm); Imperial Crown: 68.8 in (1,748 mm)
- Curb weight: 4,400–5,700 lb (1,996–2,585 kg)

Chronology
- Successor: Imperial

The Imperial name returned for 1949 as a sedan while the Imperial Crown limousine continued as Chrysler was celebrating their 25th anniversary. The short-wheelbase Imperial was only available as a four-door six-passenger sedan. The 4-door, 8-passenger Imperial Crown was available as a sedan or as a limousine with a retractable division window. 1949 Imperials are very rare; production records show that only 50 Imperial sedans and 85 Imperial Crown limousines were built. The retail price for the 1949 Imperial was US$4,664 ($63,111 in 2025 dollars) and US$5,334 ($66,162 in 2025 dollars) for the Imperial Crown limousine.

The new custom-built Imperial sedan was based on the Chrysler New Yorker. It shared the same trim, but had a canvas-covered roof and leather and broadcloth Imperial upholstery. These features were installed by Derham, on the new post-war Chrysler sheetmetal. Early 1949 Imperial Crowns were leftover 1948 models. The really new models did not arrive until March 1949. Their styling was sleeker than previous models, yet conservative. Fewer but heavier bars were used in the cross-hatched grille. The upper and center horizontal pieces wrapped around the front fenders. Rocker panel moldings, rear fender stone guards, full-length lower-window trim, and horizontal chrome strips on the rear fenders, and from the headlights to about halfway across the front doors, were used to decorate the side body.

The 1950 Crosley Hot Shot is often given credit for the first production disc brakes, but the 1949 Chrysler Imperial Crown was the first to offer them as standard equipment. The Crosley disc was a Goodyear development, a caliper type with ventilated rotor, originally designed for aircraft applications. Only the Hot Shot featured it. Lack of sufficient research caused enormous reliability problems, especially in regions requiring the use of salt on winter roads, such as sticking and corrosion. Drum brake conversion for Hot Shots was quite popular.

The Chrysler 4-wheel disc brake system was more complex and expensive than Crosley's, but far more efficient and reliable. It was built by Auto Specialties Manufacturing Company (Ausco) of St. Joseph, Michigan, under patents of inventor H.L. Lambert, and was first tested on a 1939 Plymouth. Unlike the caliper disc, the Ausco-Lambert utilized twin expanding discs that rubbed against the inner surface of a cast iron brake drum, which doubled as the brake housing. The discs spread apart to create friction against the inner drum surface through the action of standard wheel cylinders.

Chrysler discs were "self-energizing", in that some of the braking energy itself contributed to the braking effort. This was accomplished by small balls set into oval holes leading to the brake surface. When the disc made initial contact with the friction surface, the balls would be forced up the holes, forcing the discs further apart and augmenting the braking energy. This made for lighter braking pressure than with calipers, avoided brake fade, promoted cooler running, and provided a third more friction surface than standard Chrysler 12-inch (300 mm) drums. Because of the expense, however, the brakes were only standard on the Chrysler Imperial Crown through 1954, and the Town and Country Newport in 1950. They were optional, however, on other Chryslers, priced around $400, at a time when a Crosley Hot Shot retailed for $935. Today's owners consider the Ausco-Lambert very reliable and powerful, but admit its grabbiness and sensitivity.

The 1950 Imperial was essentially a New Yorker with a custom interior. It had a Cadillac-style grille treatment that included circular signal lights enclosed in a wraparound ribbed chrome piece. Side trim was similar to the previous year's model, but the front fender strip ended at the front doors, and the rear fender molding was at the tire top level and integrated into the stone guard. Unlike the standard Imperial, the Imperial Crown had a side treatment in which the rear fender moldings and stone guard were separate. Body sill moldings were used on all Imperials, but were of a less massive type on the more massive Crown models. A special version of the limousine was available. It featured a unique leather interior and a leather top that blacked out the rear quarter-windows. Power windows were standard on the Imperial Crown .

In an unusual move for the 1950s, the 1951 Imperial had noticeably less chrome than the lower-priced New Yorker that was its base. It also had three horizontal grille bars with the parking lights between the bars and a chrome vertical center piece. Aside from its front fender nameplate, side body trim was limited to the moldings below the windows, rocker panel moldings, bright metal stone shields and a heavy horizontal molding strip running across the fender strips. Three 2-door body styles were added to the Imperial model in 1951: a Club coupe, a hardtop, and a convertible. Only 650 convertibles were sold and it would be discontinued the following year, with a listed price of US$4,402 ($54,602 in 2025 dollars). 1951 was also the year that Chrysler introduced its 331 cu in (5.4 L) Hemihead V8. "Hydraguide" power steering, an industry first for use in production automobiles, became available on the Imperial for an additional $226 and it was standard on the Imperial Crown.

1952 Imperials were practically identical to the 1951 models, and the most effective way to tell the difference between them is through reference to serial numbers. The convertible bodystyle was dropped in 1952. Unlike the case with Chryslers, the Imperial's taillights were not changed. Power steering was standard. The "new" Imperial Crown was also unchanged for 1952. Only 338 of these cars were made in the 1951–1952 model run, and serial numbers indicate that 205 were registered as 1952 automobiles. A minor change was a one-inch (2.5 cm) reduction in the front tread measurement.

In 1953 the Imperial model was renamed the Imperial Custom. Although the Imperial Custom resembled the New Yorker, it had a different wheelbase, taillights, and side trim. Clean front fenders and higher rear fender stone shield set it apart from the "ordinary" Chryslers. This was also the first year for the stylized eagle hood ornament. Power brakes, power windows, center folding armrests (front and rear) and a padded dash were standard. Parking lights on all Imperials were positioned between the top and center grille moldings, a variation from the design used on other Chrysler cars. A new model was the six-passenger Imperial Custom limousine which had as standard equipment electric windows, electric division window, floor level courtesy lamps, rear compartment heater, fold-up footrests, seatback mounted clock and special luxury cloth or leather interiors. On 10 March 1953, the exclusive Imperial Custom Newport hardtop was added to the Imperial line at $325 over the price of the eight-passenger sedan ($3,911 in 2025 dollars). The 2-door Club coupe was discontinued. Imperial Custom sedans now rode on a wheelbase 2 inches (51 mm) longer than the 2-door hardtops. The eagle ornament was about the only thing new on the 1953 Imperial Crown. The nameplate was changed slightly and the limousine featured moldings on top of the rear fenders. Imperial Crowns came with a 12-volt electrical system (Imperial Customs still had a 6-volt system) and Chrysler's first fully automatic transmission, called PowerFlite, became available late in the model year, being installed in a limited number of cars for testing and evaluation. Power steering was standard on Imperial Crowns. Also, 1953 was the first year that the Imperial had a one-piece windshield, instead of a two-piece one. A padded dash was standard.

The 1953 Chrysler Imperial was the first production car in twelve years to have automotive air conditioning, following tentative experiments by Packard in 1940 and Cadillac in 1941. Walter P. Chrysler had seen to the invention of Airtemp air conditioning back in the 1930s for the Chrysler Building, and had ostensibly offered it on cars in 1941–42, and again in 1951–52, but none are known to have been sold in the latter form until the 1953 model year. In installing optional Airtemp air conditioning units to its Imperials in 1953, Chrysler beat Cadillac, Buick and Oldsmobile which added air conditioning as an option in the 1953 model year.

Airtemp was more sophisticated and efficient than the complicated rival air conditioners of 1953. It recirculated, rather than merely cooled, the air inside the vehicle, and it was also the highest capacity unit available on an automobile. It was also simple to operate, with a single switch on the dashboard marked with low, medium, and high positions, which the driver selected as desired. The system was capable of cooling a Chrysler from 120 degrees to 85 degrees in about two minutes, and of eliminating humidity, dust, pollen and tobacco smoke at the same time. Since it relied on fresh air, and drew in sixty percent more of it than any contemporary system, Airtemp avoided the staleness associated with automotive air conditioning at the time. It was silent and unobtrusive. Instead of plastic tubes mounted on the package shelf as on GM and on other cars, small ducts directed cool air toward the ceiling of the car where it filtered down around the passengers instead of blowing directly on them, a feature that modern cars have lost.

In 1954 the Imperial Custom had a new grille consisting of a heavy wraparound horizontal center bar with five ridges on top and integrated circular signal lights. Its front fender nameplate was above a chrome strip, which ran the length of the front door to the front of the door opening. The rear fender stone guard was larger than in 1953, but the rocker panel molding and rear fender chrome strip style were still the same. The back-up lights were now located directly below the taillights, rather than dividing the lights as in the previous year's model. The Imperial Crown shared basic styling with the Imperial Custom. However it had center-opening rear doors and Cadillac-like rear fender taillights. Air conditioning was standard on the Imperial Crown .

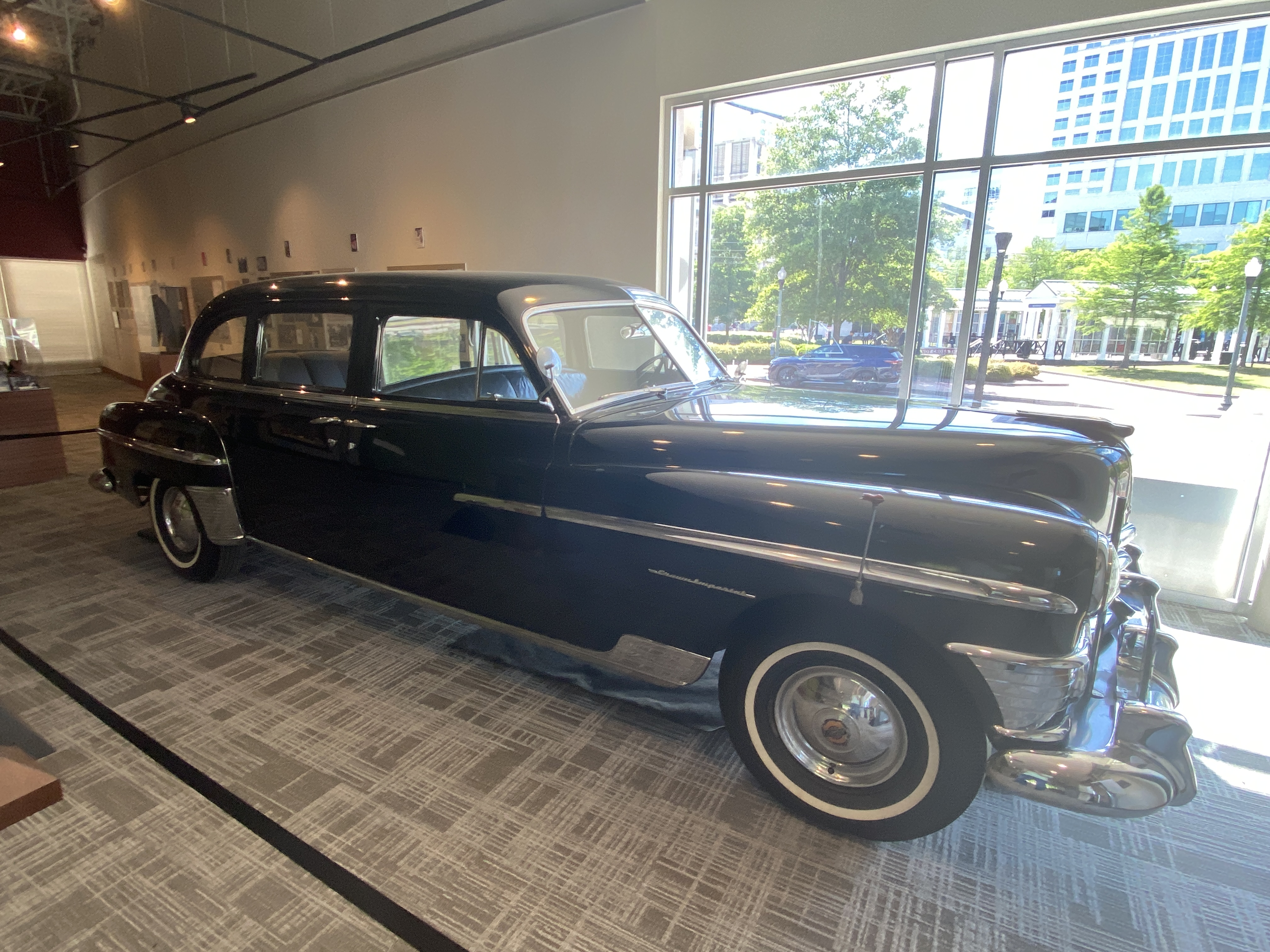
1950 Chrysler Crown Imperial Limousine

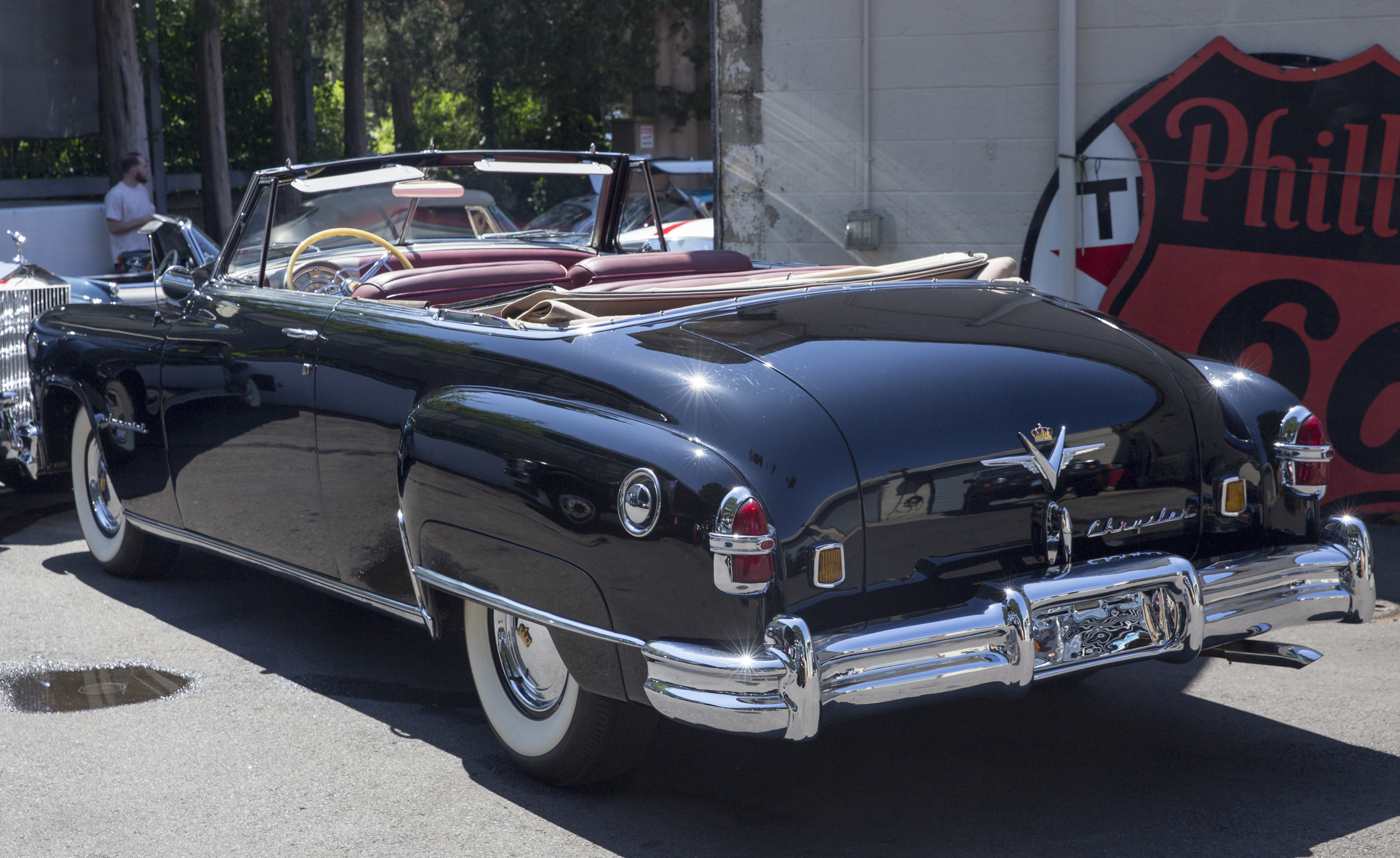
1951 Chrysler Imperial Convertible (rear)

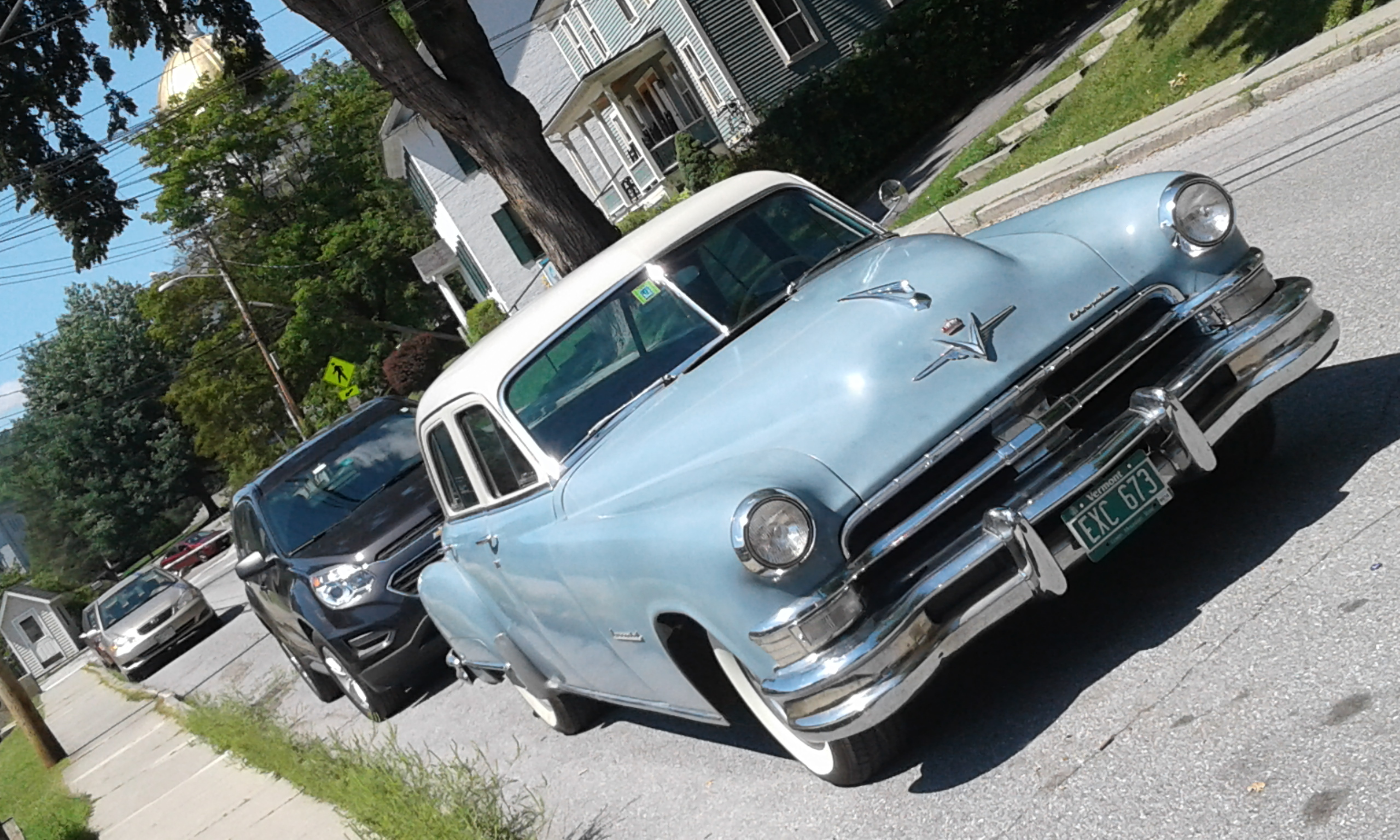
1952 Chrysler Imperial Sedan

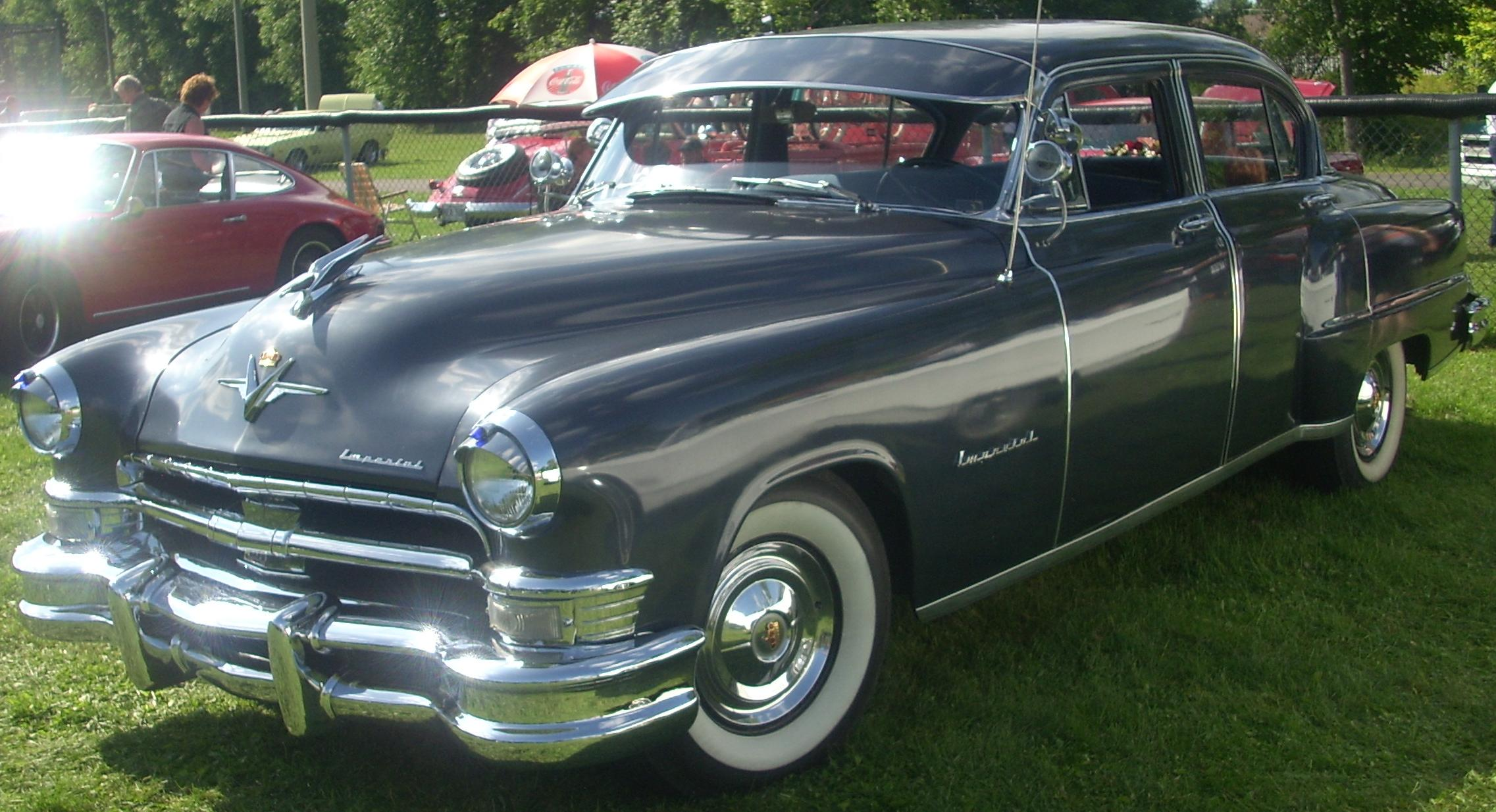
1953 Chrysler Imperial Custom

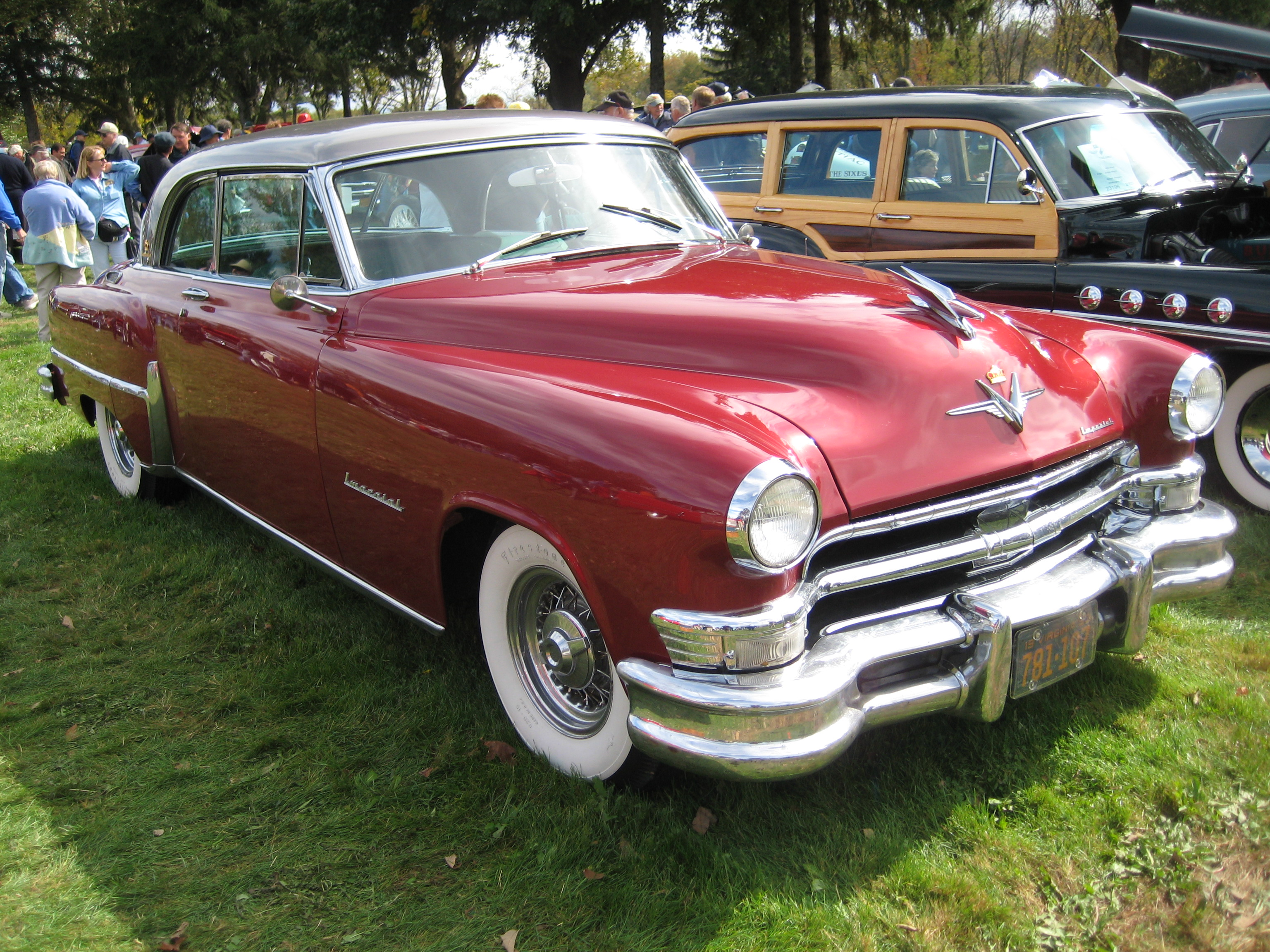
1953 Chrysler Imperial Custom Newport hardtop coupe

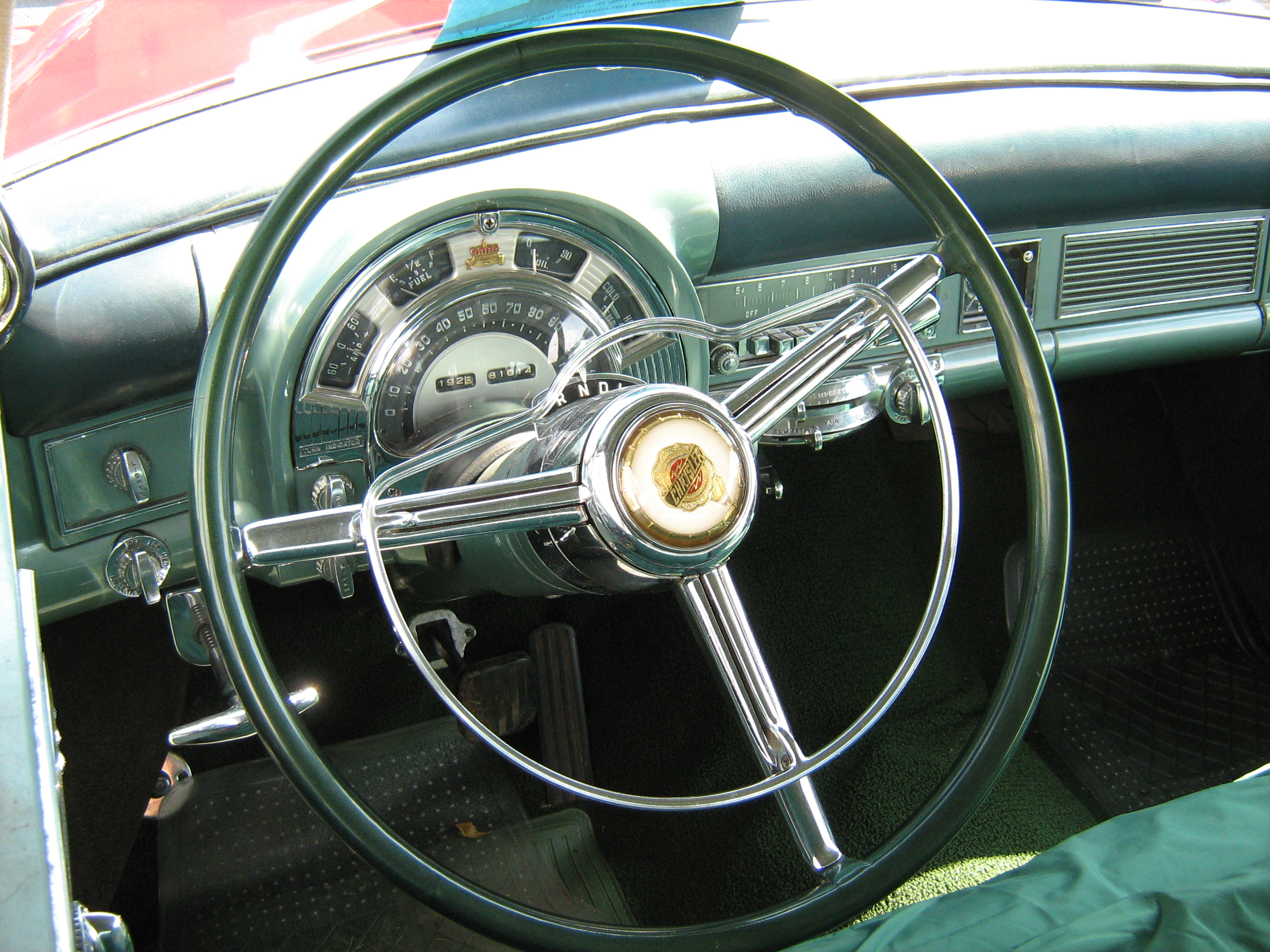
1953 Chrysler Imperial Custom coupe interior

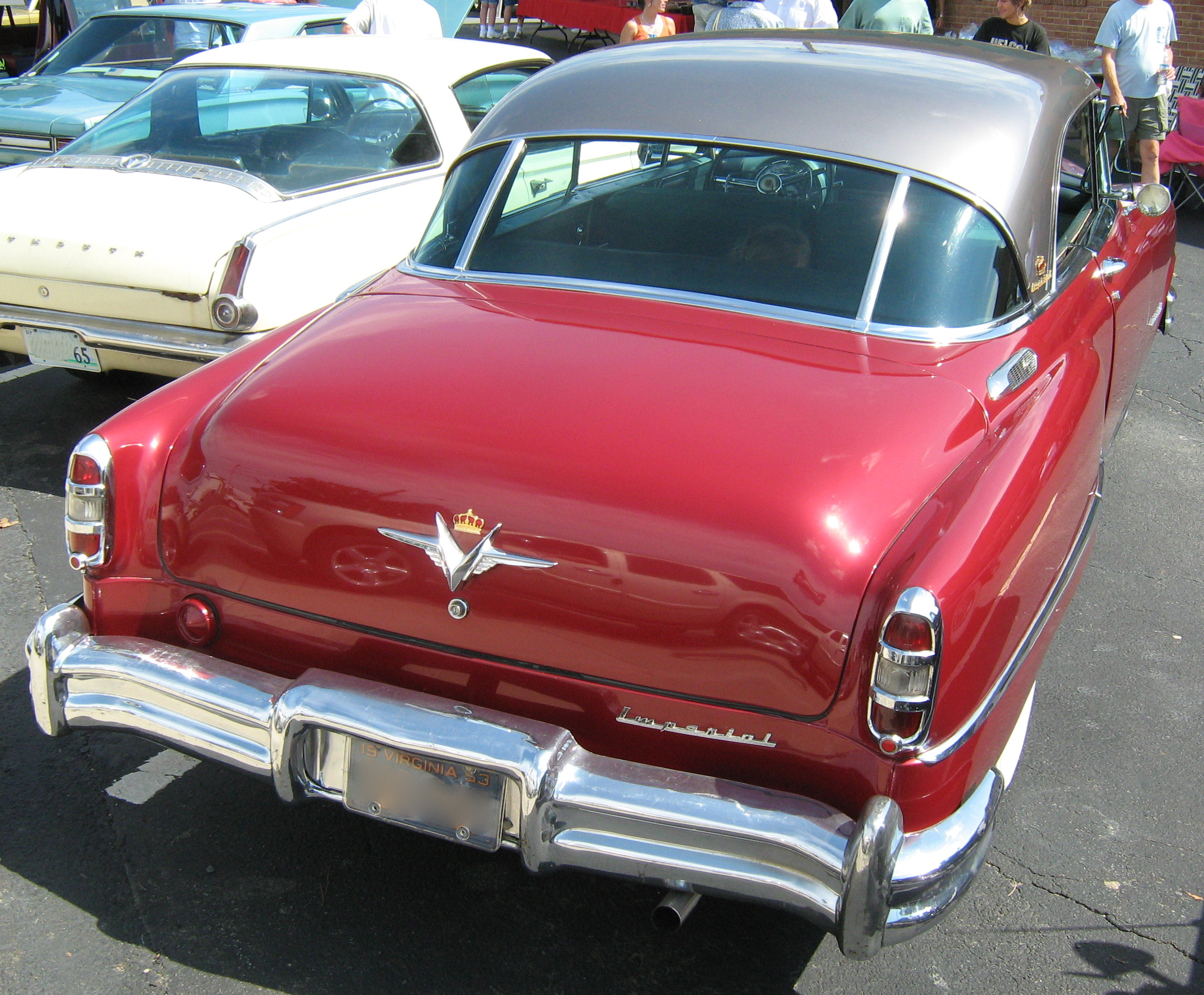
1953 Chrysler Imperial Custom coupe rear

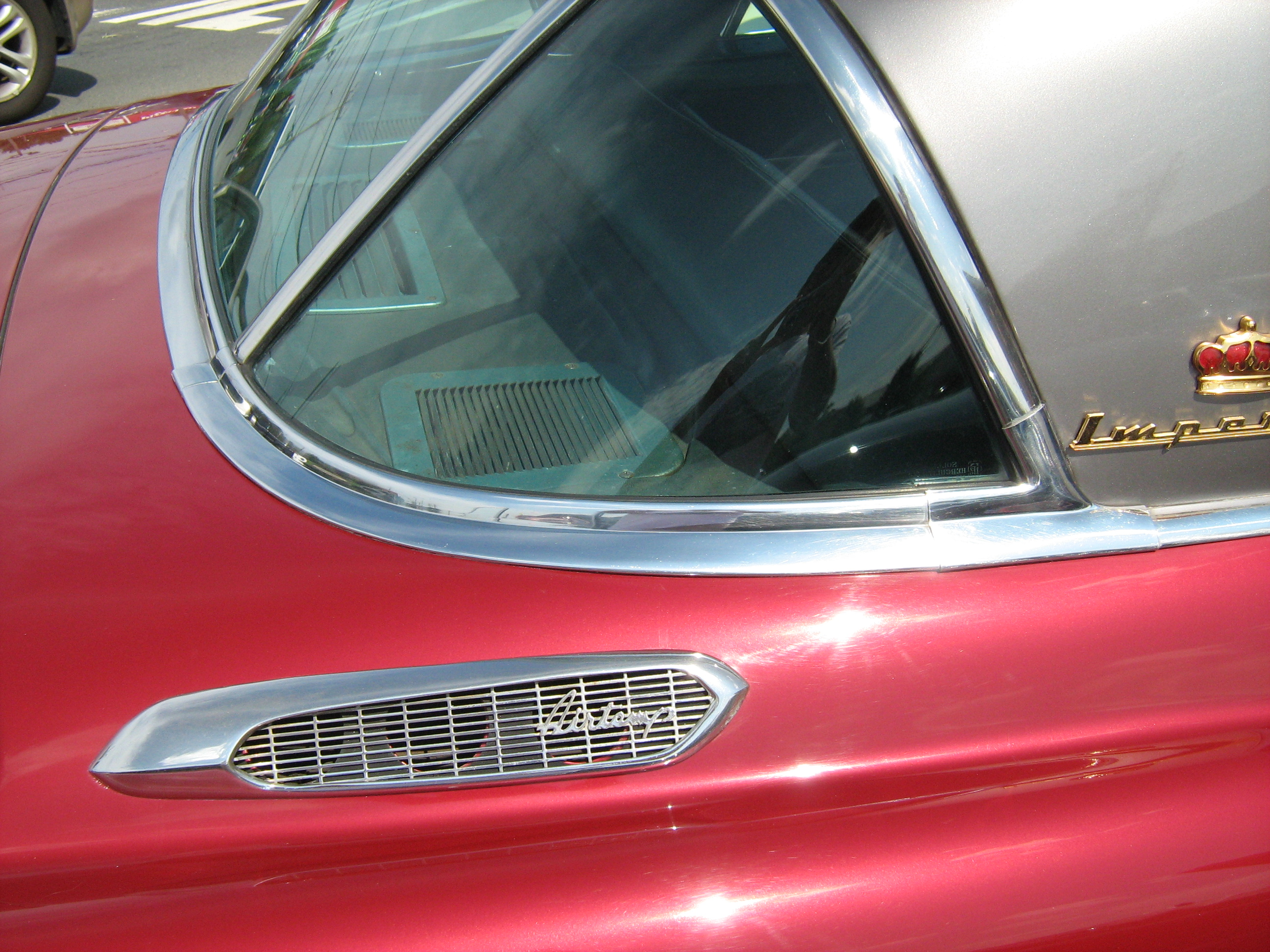
1953 Chrysler Imperial Custom coupe Airtemp air conditioning vents

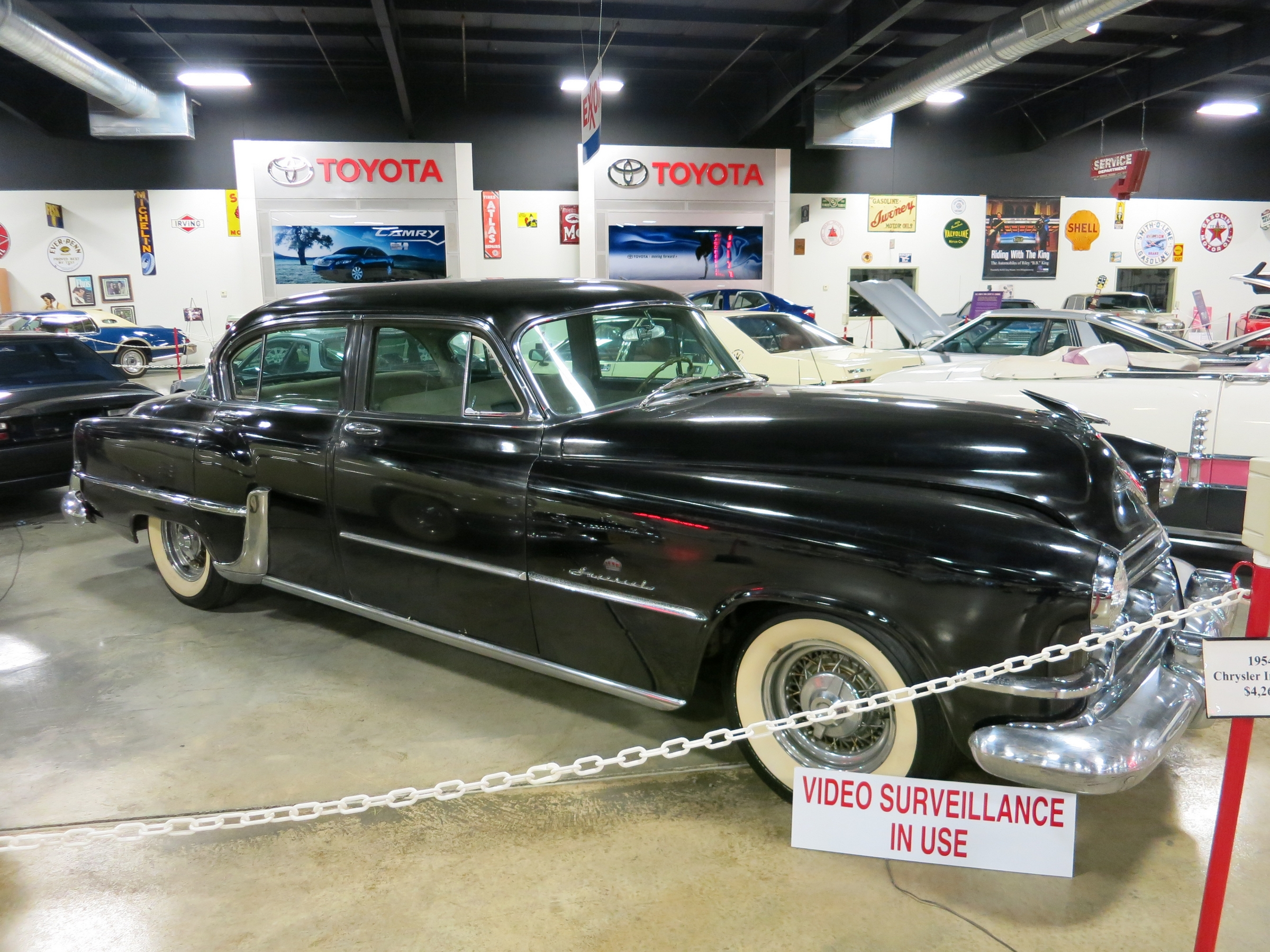
1954 Chrysler Imperial Custom sedan

== 1955–1975: A separate brand ==
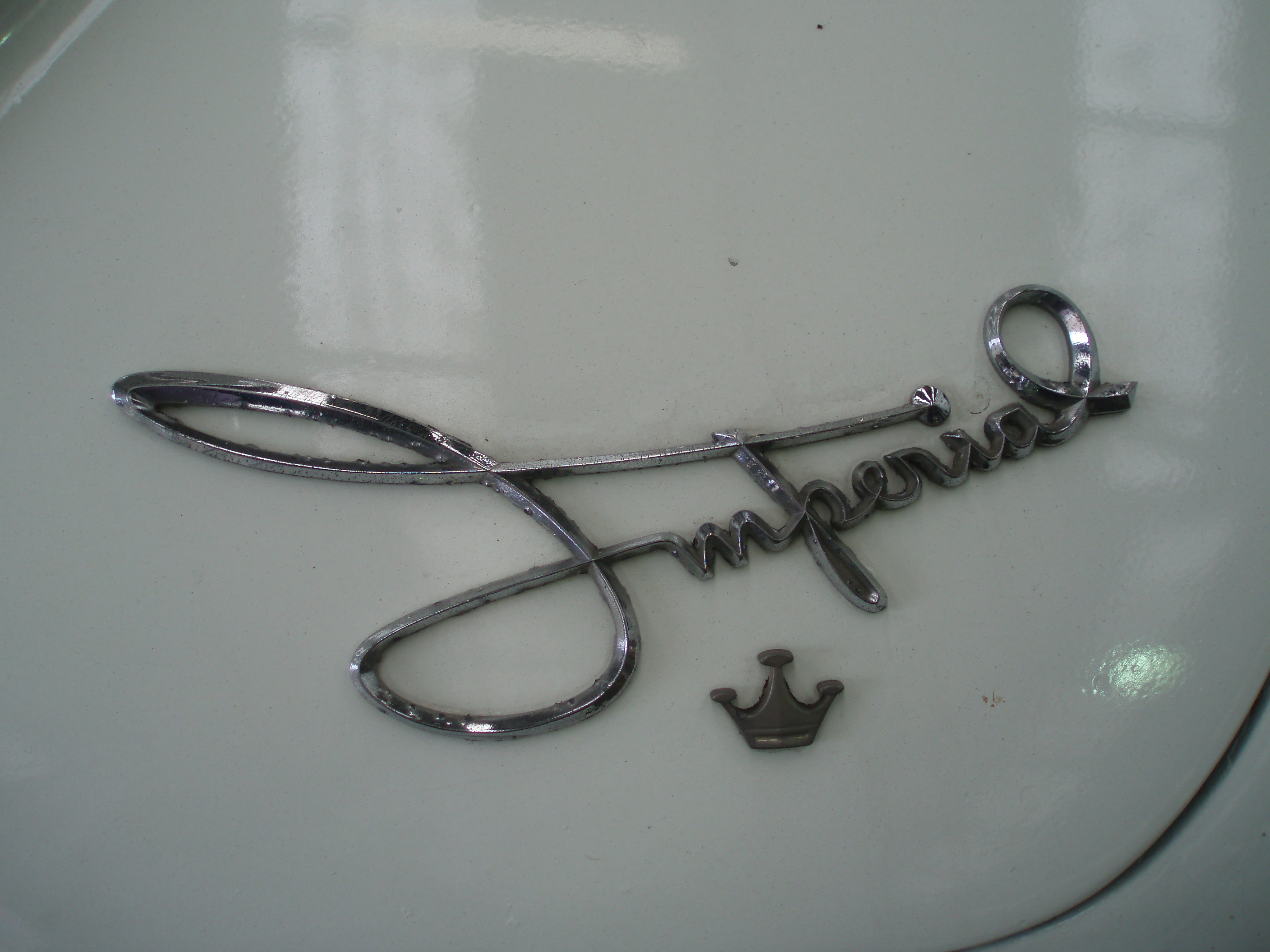
Imperial badge

=== 1955–1975 ===
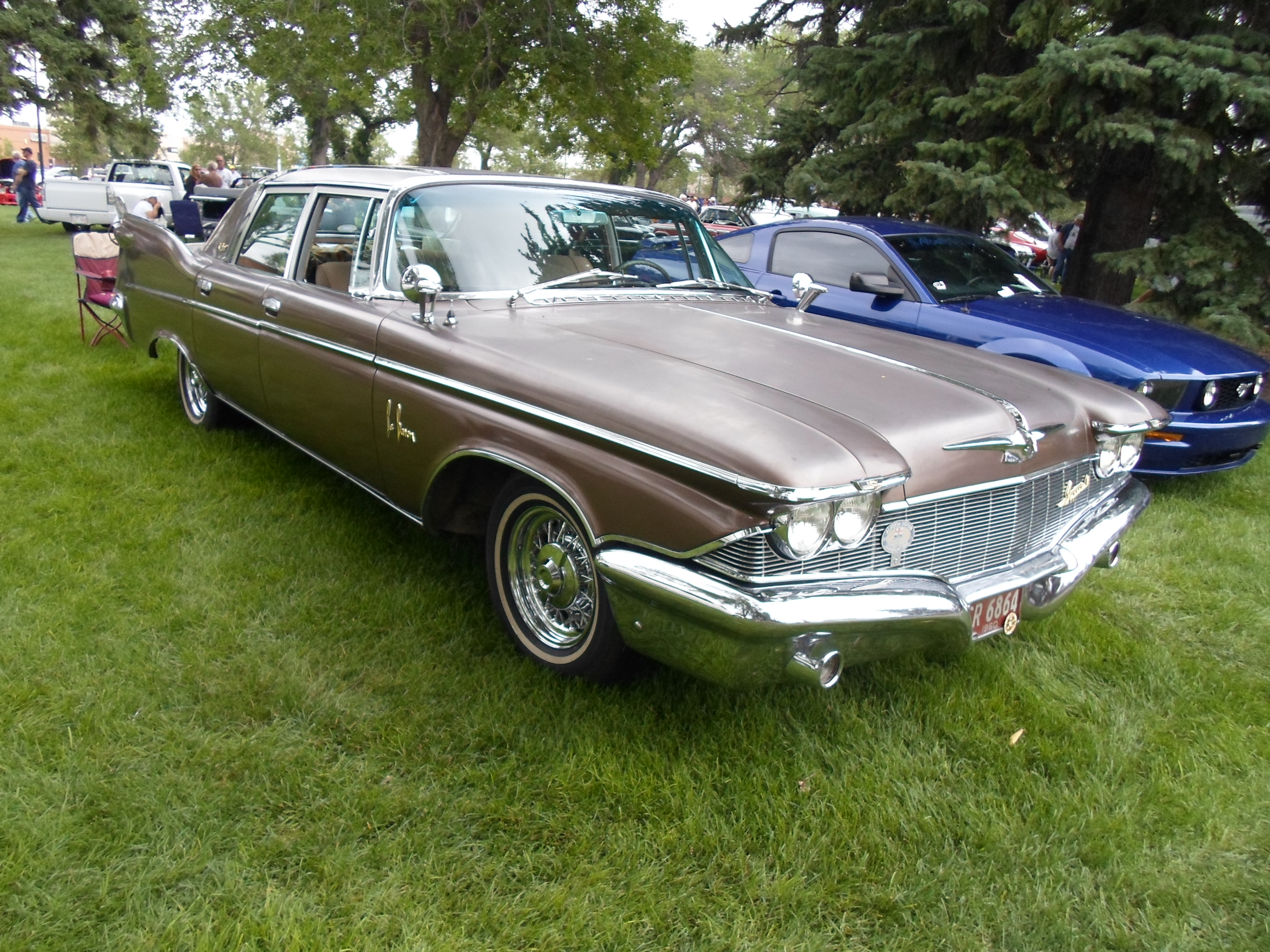
1960 Imperial LeBaron

Chrysler Corporation advised state licensing bureaus that beginning in 1955, the Imperial was to be registered as a separate make. It was an attempt to compete directly with GM's Cadillac and Ford's Lincoln luxury-focused marques. Frequently and erroneously referred to as the "Chrysler Imperial", this period of Imperial production was a separate marque, and had no "Chrysler" badging anywhere on its cars until 1971; starting with the 1974 models, the "Chrysler" badging was again removed from car bodies, with only the "Imperial" nameplate appearing.

In April 1955 Chrysler and Philco announced the development and production of the world's first all-transistor car radio. The radio, Mopar model 914HR, was a $150.00 "option", or equal to $1674 today on 1956 Imperial automobile models. Philco began manufacturing the all-transistor car radio for Chrysler in the fall of 1955 at its Sandusky, Ohio plant.

With the new "Imperial" make, Chrysler Corporation's intention was to create an individual line of luxury cars, above and distinct from Chrysler branded vehicles. This marketing strategy suffered because the cars were rarely (if ever) sold in stand-alone Imperial showrooms. Cadillac and Lincoln did a much better job of separating their luxury marques from the lower priced cars that they sold. Imperial was instead offered at the Chrysler dealer network alongside Chrysler's offerings, and the marque was almost universally known as "Chrysler Imperial" in the public's mind for this reason, despite the fact that all existing dealerships did indeed carry separate "Imperial" dealership signs distinct from Chrysler.

The Imperial automobiles continued to be retailed through Chrysler dealerships. A distinct marketing channel was not established; thus, the Imperial nameplate failed to separate itself from the other Chrysler models and become a stand-alone marque. Beginning in 1967, the Imperial Division, offering three ranges (Custom, Crown, and LeBaron), retreated from their separate body-on-frame construction and their unique body on a 129.5-inch wheelbase. From that time, Imperials used the Chrysler body. It was fitted with unique styling, and through 1973, very long hoods which accounted for the three-inch-longer (127 vs. 124") wheelbase as compared to Chrysler sedans. They continued to use their unique front suspension with torsion bars longer than all other Chrysler products and a rubber-isolated subframe crossmember containing the torsion bar anchors, as well as full instrumentation backed up by warning lights. In 1974 and 1975, separate brochures were published and separate Imperial signs still stood above the dealerships, and the Imperial continued to feature unique features (such as hidden headlights as featured since 1969, optional antilock brakes as offered since 1971, and standard four-wheel disc brakes in both 1974 and 1975), the wheelbase was reduced to the same 124" as other big Chryslers.

Although there were no Imperials produced between 1976 and 1980, the styling that was previously used for Imperial was rebranded as the Chrysler New Yorker Brougham during this time. The rear disc brakes and optional antilock feature disappeared, but the exceptionally nice interiors, including rear reading lights with precision-ground lenses which did not shine on the windshield, and four cigarette lighters, continued mostly unchanged.

=== 1981–1983 Chrysler Imperial ===
The Imperial model name was again resurrected for a Windsor-built Chrysler that was offered from 1981 through 1983. This Imperial was a two-door coupe based on the second-generation Chrysler Cordoba designated as the J-body platform (derived from the M-body architecture).All 1981–1983 Imperial used Chrysler's 318 cubic-inch V8 engine. All 1981-1983 Imperials came standard with fuel injection, generating power of 140 hp (104 kW) and dispatched of the 0–60 mph (97 km/h) sprint in 13.4 seconds, with a top speed of 107 mph (172 km/h). The electronic fuel injection system, however, proved unreliable and hard to repair and many cars were converted to carburetors by dealerships.

== 1990–1993 ==
Seventh generation
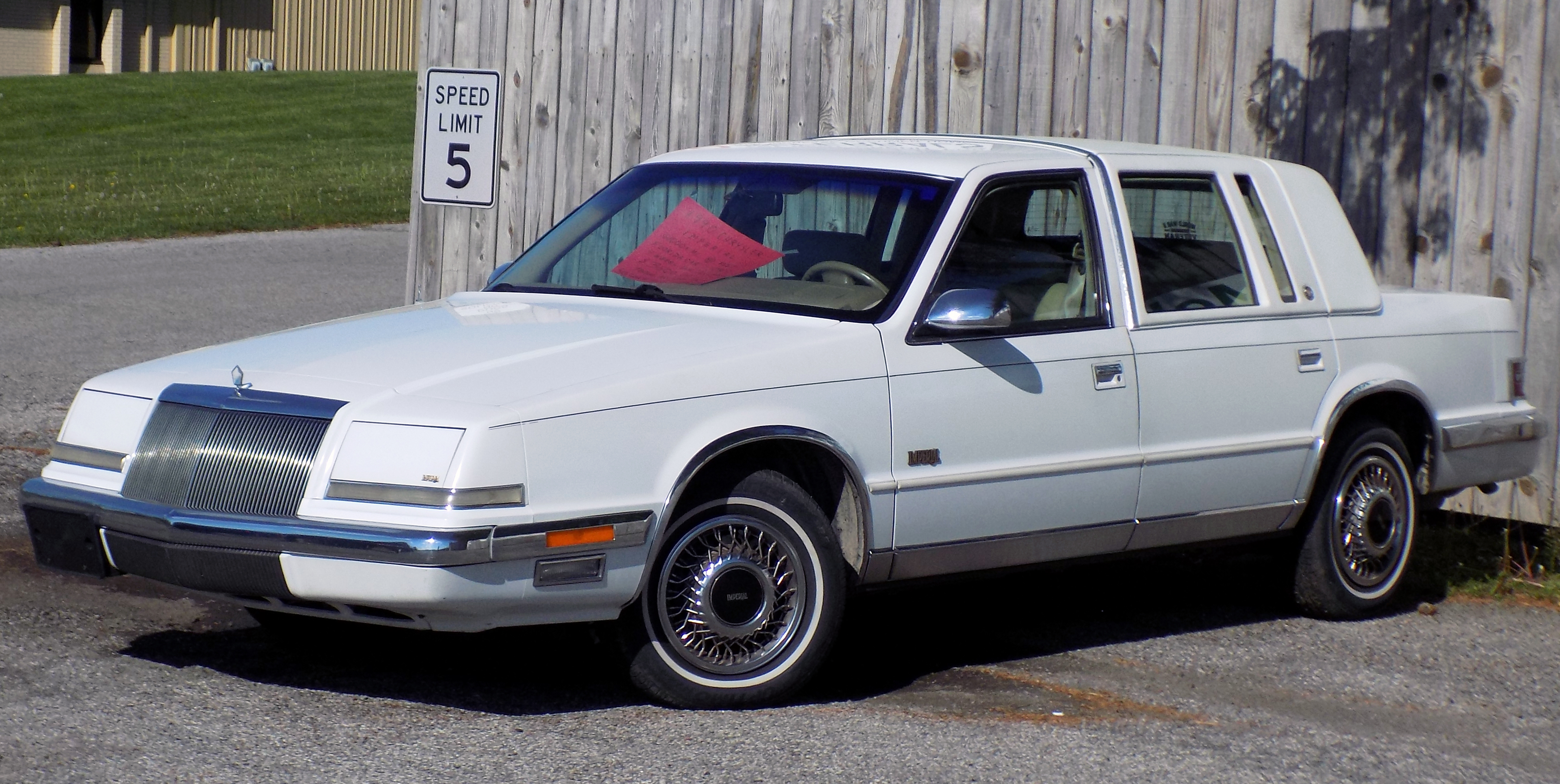
- 1990 Chrysler Imperial

Overview
- Production: 1989–1993
- Model years: 1990–1993
- Assembly: Belvidere Assembly Plant, Belvidere, Illinois

Body and chassis
- Body style: 4-door sedan
- Layout: FF layout
- Platform: AY-body
- Related: Chrysler New Yorker Fifth Avenue

Powertrain
- Engine: 3.3 L EGA V6; 3.8 L EGH V6
- Transmission: 4-speed automatic

Dimensions
- Wheelbase: 109.6 in (2,784 mm)
- Length: 203 in (5,156 mm)
- Width: 68.9 in (1,750 mm)
- Height: 55.3 in (1,405 mm)
- Curb weight: 3,519 lb (1,596 kg)

Chronology
- Successor: Chrysler LHS

1990 saw a revival of the Imperial as a high-end sedan in Chrysler's lineup to replace the dated Fifth Avenue. Unlike the 1955–1973 Imperials, this car was a model of Chrysler, not its own marque. Based on the Y platform, it represented the top full-size model in Chrysler's lineup, above the New Yorker Fifth Avenue.

The reintroduction of the Imperial was two years after the Lincoln Continental was changed to a front-wheel-drive sedan with a V6 engine. Other domestic competitors in this segment included the Cadillac Sedan de Ville/Fleetwood, Oldsmobile 98 and Buick Electra/Park Avenue, all of which shared General Motors' then-flagship C platform.

Though closely related, efforts were made to distinguish the Imperial from the New Yorker Fifth Avenue: the Imperial's nose was more wedge-shaped, while the New Yorker Fifth Avenue's initially had a sharper, more angular profile (before gaining a more rounded front and rear); the Imperial's rear was more contoured, the New Yorker Fifth Avenue's more sharply angled; the Imperial got a full-width taillight treatment (similar to the contemporary Chrysler TC) and reminiscent of the early 1980s Imperial coupe), while the New Yorker Fifth Avenue's taillights were small and vertical; and the Imperial's seats were more streamlined than the signature button-tufted, pillowed-cushioned seating of the New Yorker Fifth Avenue.

Initially, the 1990 Imperial was powered by the 147 hp (110 kW) 3.3 L EGA V6 engine, which was rated at 185 lb⋅ft (251 N⋅m) of torque. For 1991, the 3.3 L V6 was replaced by the larger 3.8 L EGH V6. Although horsepower only increased to 150 hp (112 kW), with the new larger 3.8 L V6 torque increased to 215 lb⋅ft (292 N⋅m) at 2750 rpm. A four-speed automatic transmission was standard with both engines.

This generation Imperial was a 6-passenger sedan offered either in "Kimberly Velvet" velour or optional "Mark Cross Leather". Power equipment came standard, as did automatic climate-controlled air conditioning, anti-lock brakes, cruise control, driver's side airbag, and its distinct landau vinyl roof. The Imperial featured hidden headlamps behind retractable covers similar to those found on the LeBaron coupe/convertible and New Yorker/Fifth Avenue. The Imperial was available with a choice of several Infinity sound systems, all with a cassette player. Other major options included a fully electronic digital instrument cluster with an information center, an electronically controlled air suspension system, and remote keyless entry with a security alarm. Dealer-installed integrated Chrysler cellular phones and six-disc CD changers were also available.

All seventh-generation Imperials were covered by Chrysler's market-leading "Crystal Key Owner Care Program" which included a 5-year/50,000-mile limited warranty and a 7-year/70,000-mile powertrain warranty. A 24-hour toll-free customer service hotline was also provided.

As originally planned, this generation Chrysler Imperial was discontinued after the 1993 model year along with the Y-body and C-body New Yorkers. They were replaced by the new LH platform sedans. While the New Yorker name continued on for three more years, 1993 would be the last year for the Imperial nameplate. The critically acclaimed cab-forward styled Chrysler LHS replaced the Imperial as Chrysler's flagship model for 1994.

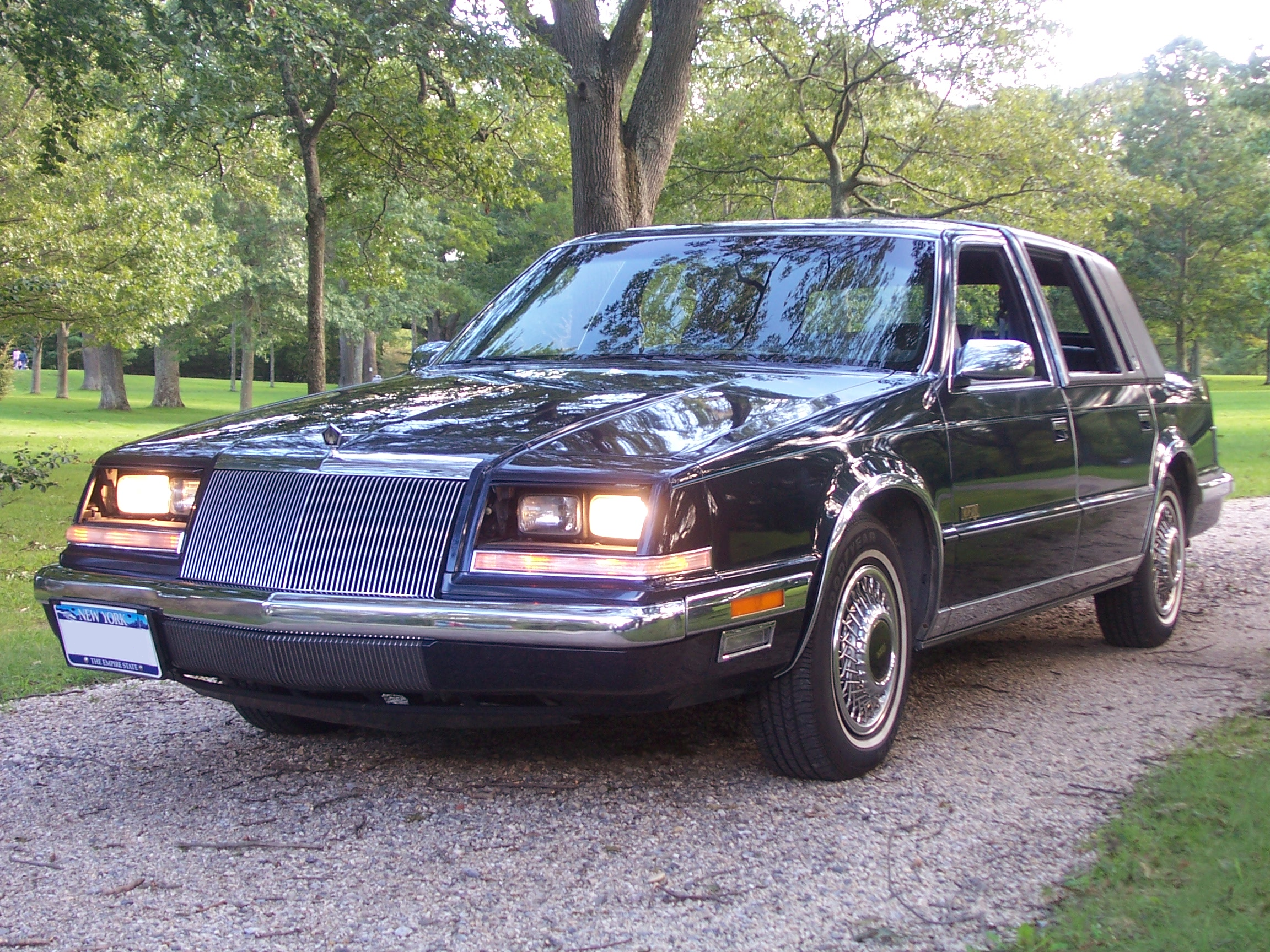
1992 Chrysler Imperial (open headlamp covers)

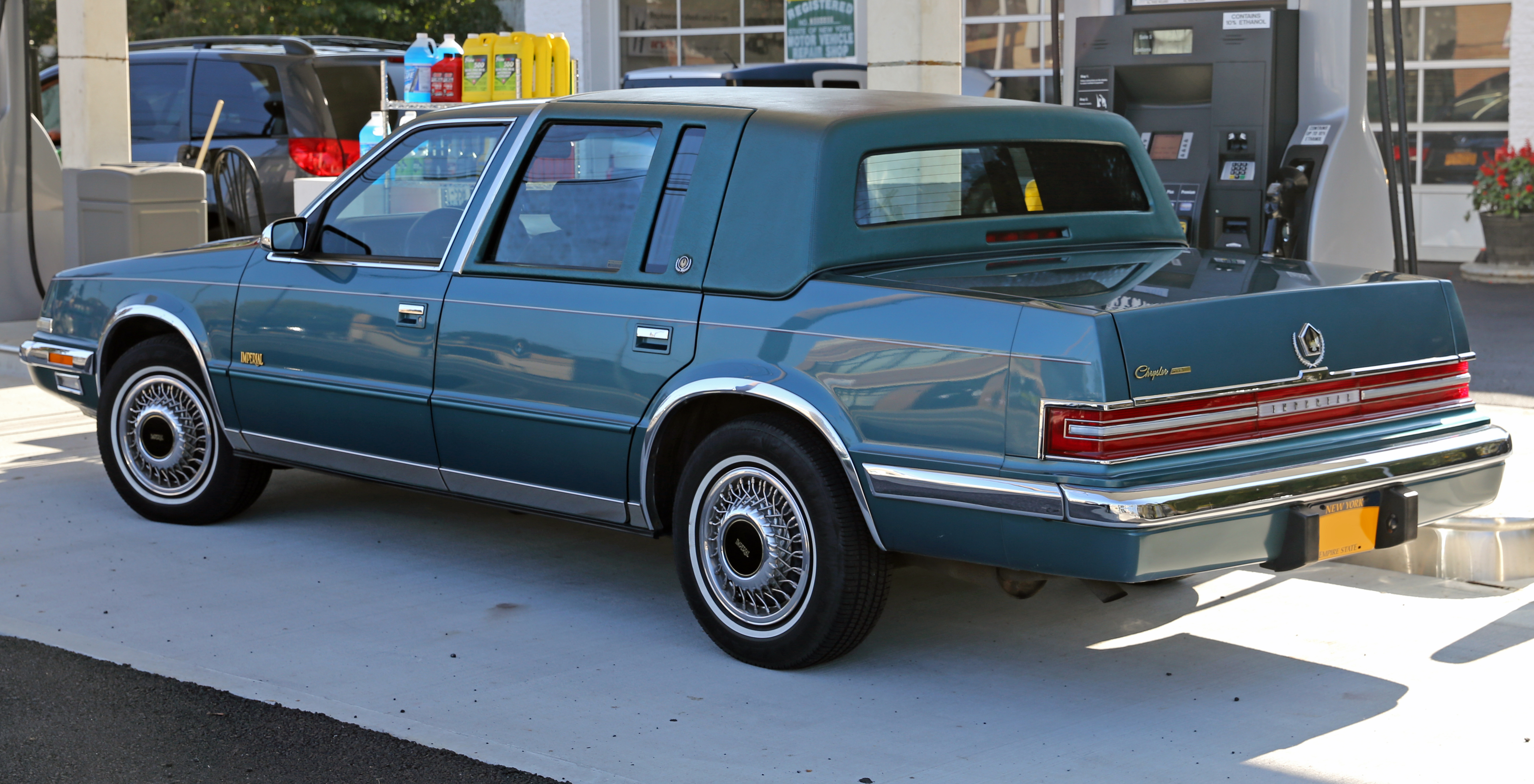
The 1990s Chrysler Imperial featured full-width taillights

=== Production figures and prices ===
Production figures/prices
Year	Units	Original MSRP	2025 Dollar Equivalent
1990	14,968	$25,655	$63,223
1991	11,601	$27,119	$64,104
1992	7,643	$28,453	$65,279
1993	7,064	$29,481	$65,706
Total	41,276		

== 2006 ==
=== Concept car ===
Chrysler Imperial Concept
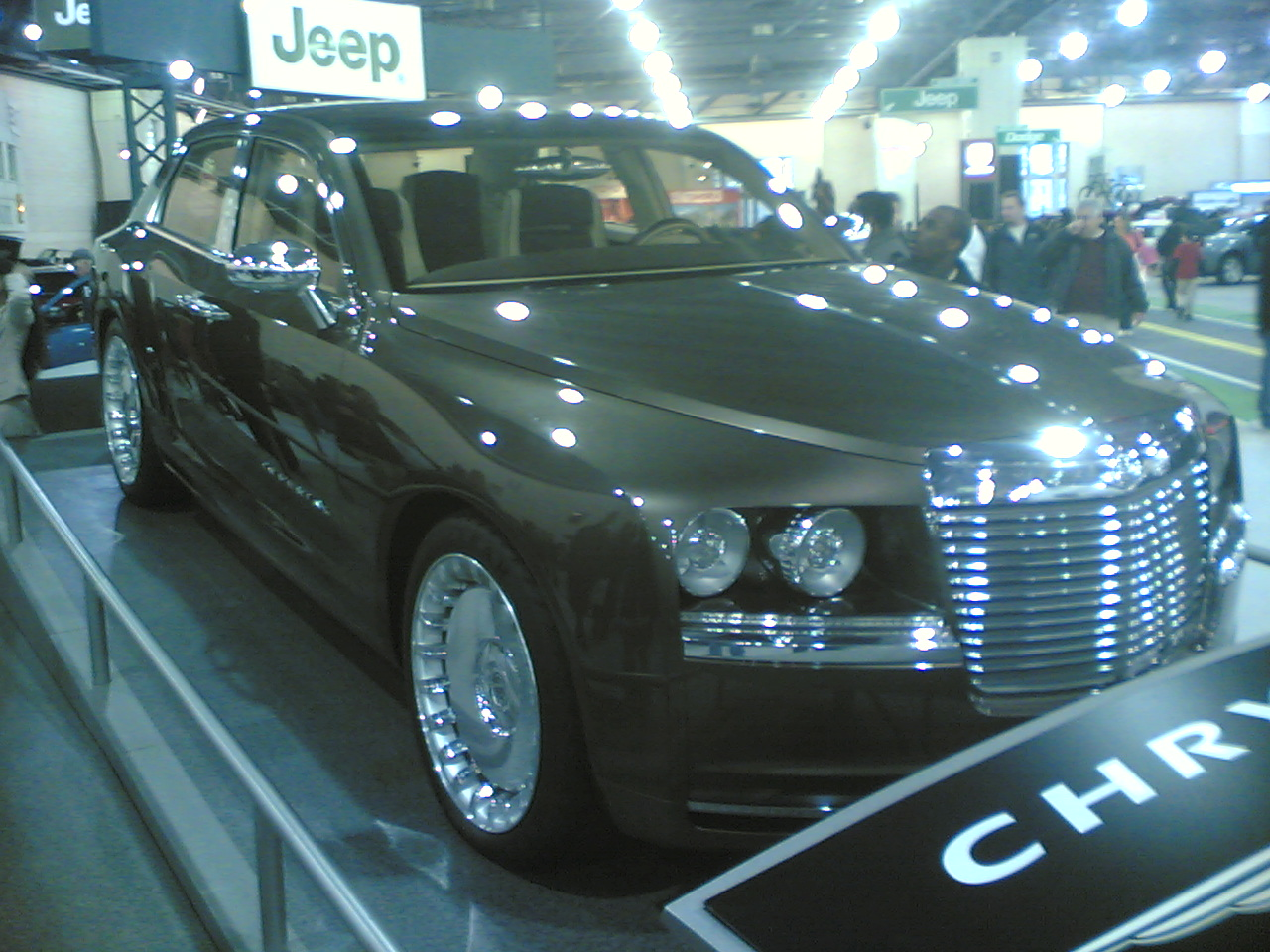

Overview
- Production: 2006 (Concept car)

Body and chassis
- Class: Full-size luxury car
- Body style: 4-door sedan
- Layout: FR layout
- Platform: Chrysler LY platform
- Related: Chrysler 300

Dimensions
- Wheelbase: 123 in (3,124 mm)

A Chrysler Imperial concept car was presented at the 2006 North American International Auto Show. This concept used the Chrysler LY platform, an extended LX. It featured a 123 in (3,124 mm) wheelbase. Riding on 22-inch (560 mm) wheels, the car presented "a six-figure image but at a much lower price" according to Tom Tremont, Vice President of advanced vehicle design for Chrysler. The design incorporated a long hood and front end dominated by an upright radiator and a horizontal themed grille. Brushed and polished aluminum pods evoked the free-standing headlamps (a classical throwback favored by 1960s Chrysler chief designers Virgil Exner and Elwood Engel, used commonly in 1930s Chrysler vehicles). Circular LED taillights with floating outer rings harkened to the "gun sight" taillight look of early 1960s Imperials. The roof line was pulled rearward to enlarge the cabin and to create a longer profile.

On 17 July 2007, Chrysler officially announced it would drop the production plans for the Imperial. Citing increasing fuel costs and more stringent fuel economy standards expected from the federal government, Chrysler said that the Imperial project was off, as a viable business case could no longer be made for the car. The Imperial had been rumored to be based on the future Mercedes R-Class or the next generation LX-platform (LY, or a combination of components) and it was suggested that all of the work done on the Imperial program would be rolled into forthcoming LY-platform cars, a prediction that did not come to pass.

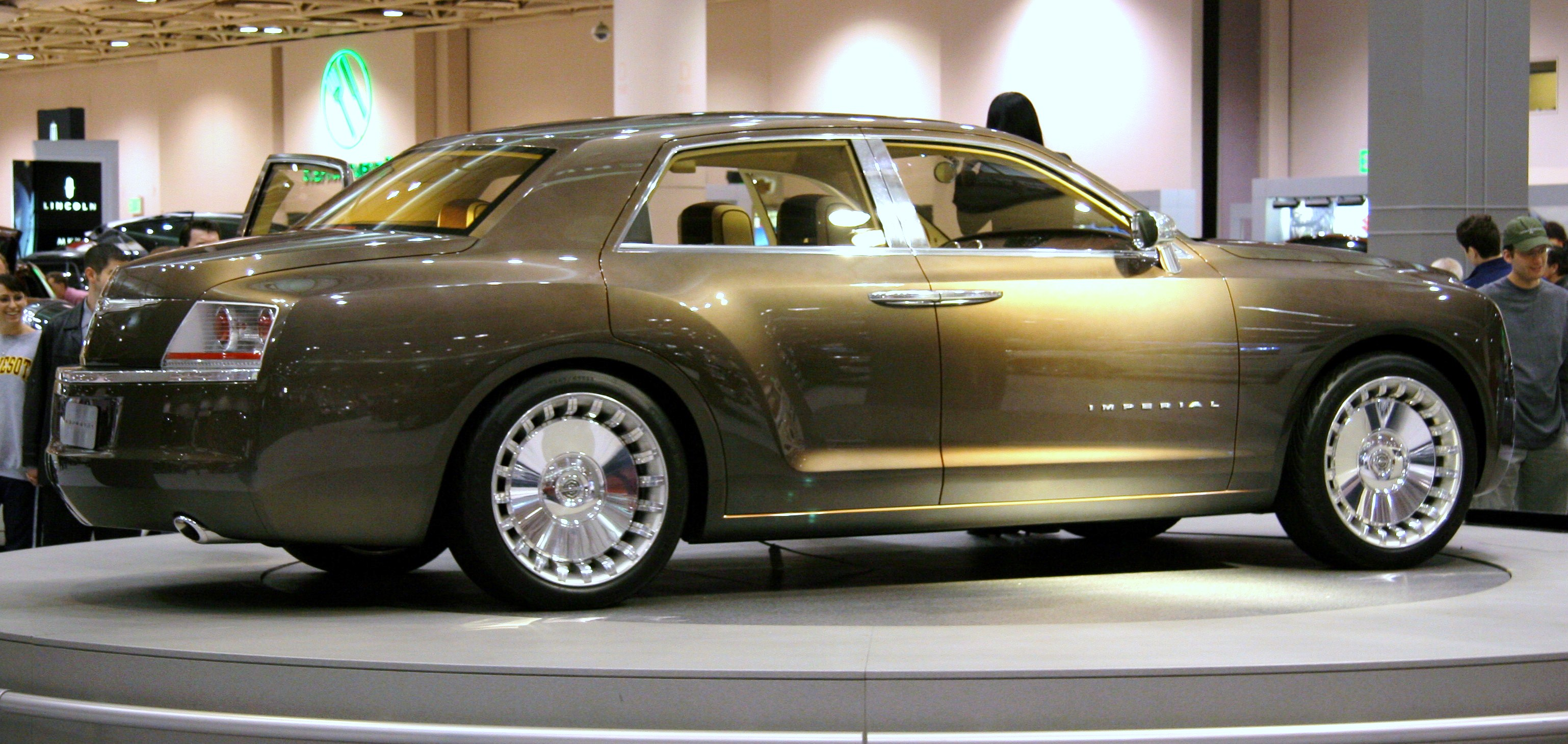
Chrysler Imperial concept side view

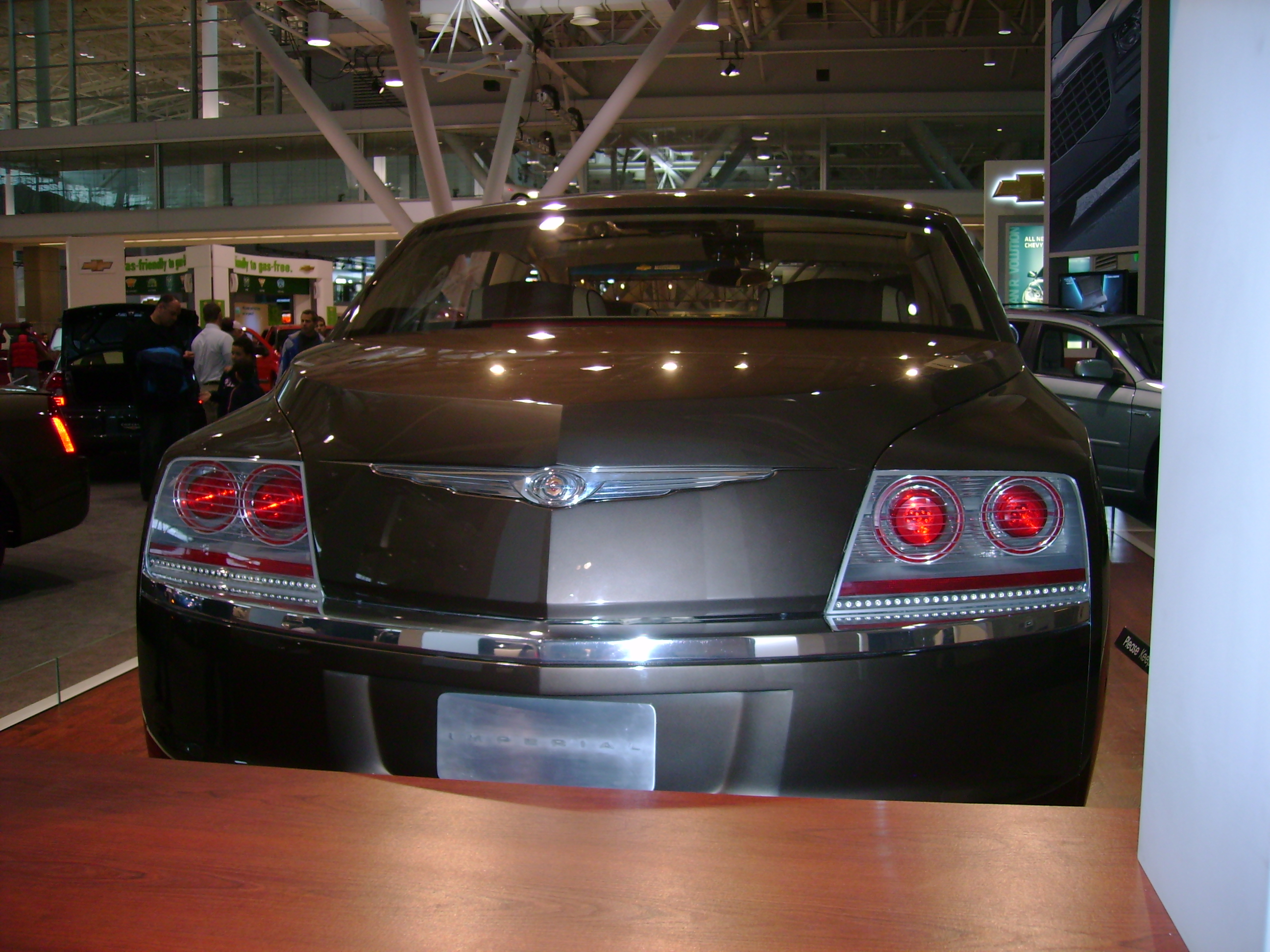
Chrysler Imperial concept rear view

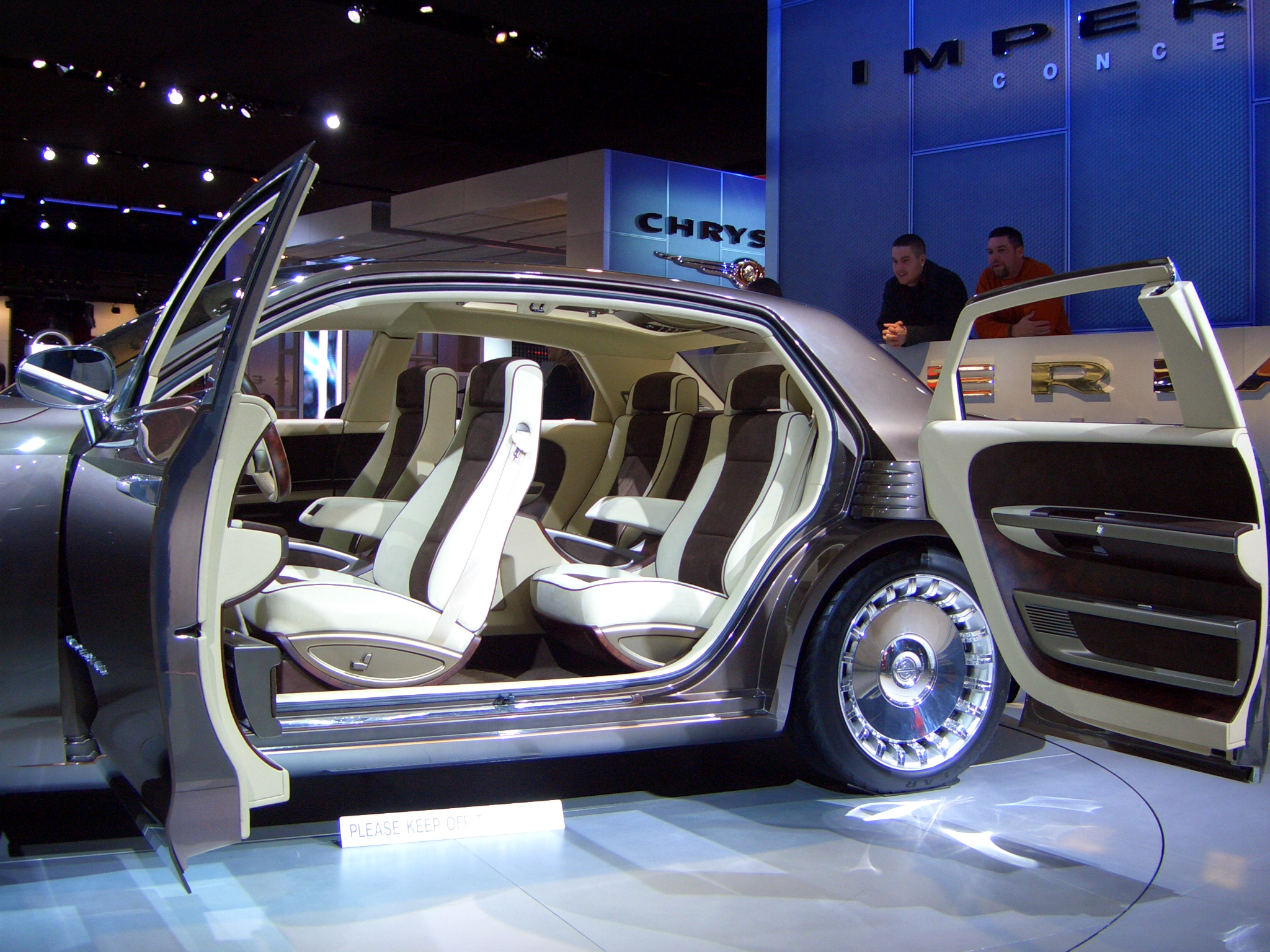
Doors open showing the interior

== See also ==
- Imperial (automobile)
