= Rosa 'Mister Lincoln' =

Hybrid tea bush rose variety

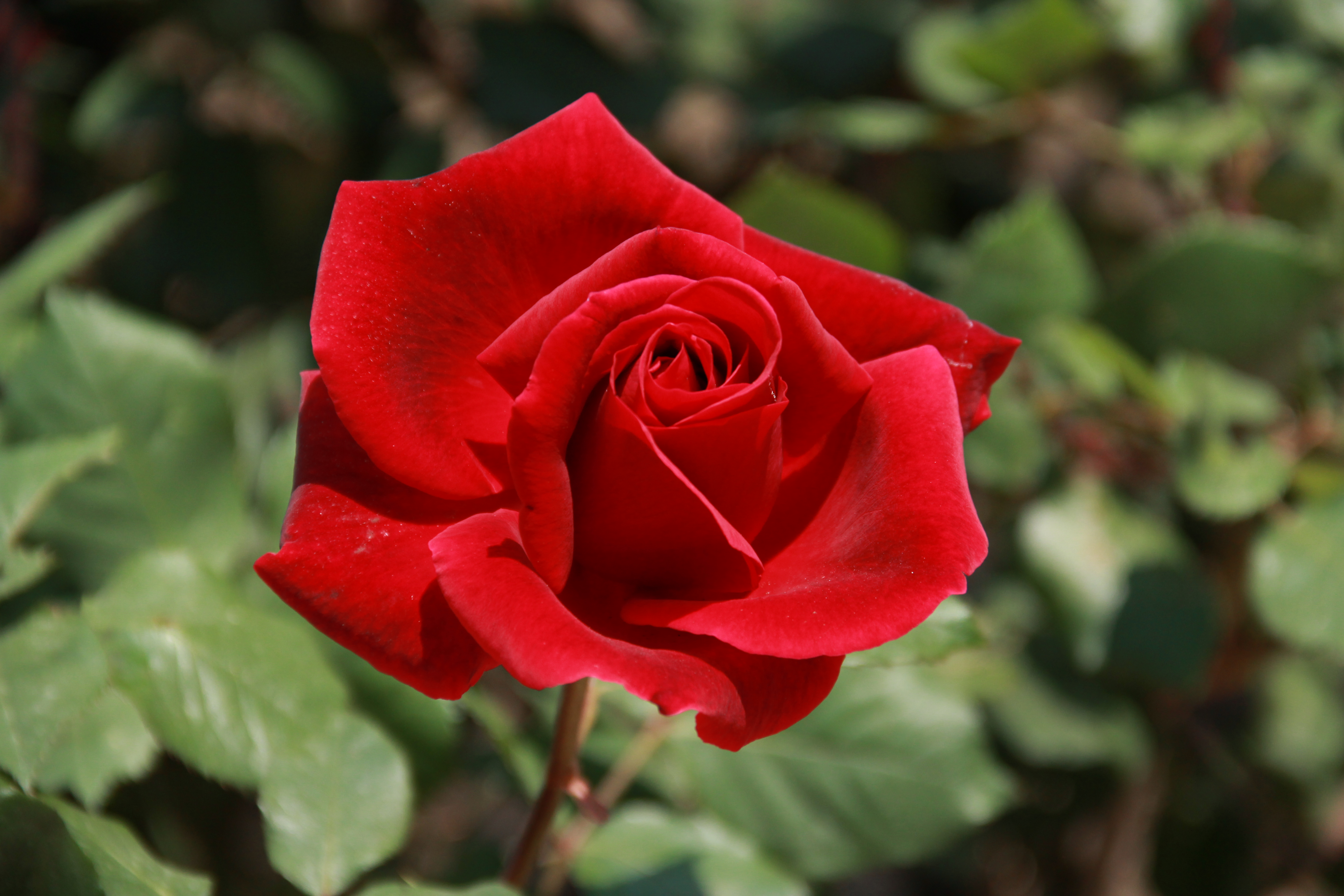
- Rosa 'Mister Lincoln'
- Genus: Rosa hybrid
- Hybrid parentage: 'Chrysler Imperial' x 'Charles Mallerin'
- Cultivar group: Hybrid tea rose
- Marketing names: 'Mister Lincoln', 'Mr. Lincoln'
- Breeder: Swim & Weeks
- Origin: United States, 1964

Rosa 'Mister Lincoln', also known as 'Mr. Lincoln', is a dark red hybrid tea rose cultivar. Bred by Herbert Swim and Weeks Rose Growers in 1964, the rose was named an All-America Rose Selections winner in 1965.

== History ==
'Mister Lincoln' was created by Herbert Swim and Weeks Rose Growers in 1964. The stock parents of this rose are the hybrid tea rose cultivars 'Chrysler Imperial' and 'Charles Mallerin'. The plant was introduced into the United States via California by Star Roses in 1965. 'Mister Lincoln' was the best-selling crimson rose in the US for many years. Known as the "California drought friendly native rose", it won the All-America Rose Selections award in 1965. 'Mister Lincoln' was used to hybridize two new cultivars, Rosa 'Big Apple' (1983) and Rosa 'Dublin' (1983). Mister Lincoln rose petals can be used to create rose water which is used in food, desserts and as a room deodorant.

== Description ==
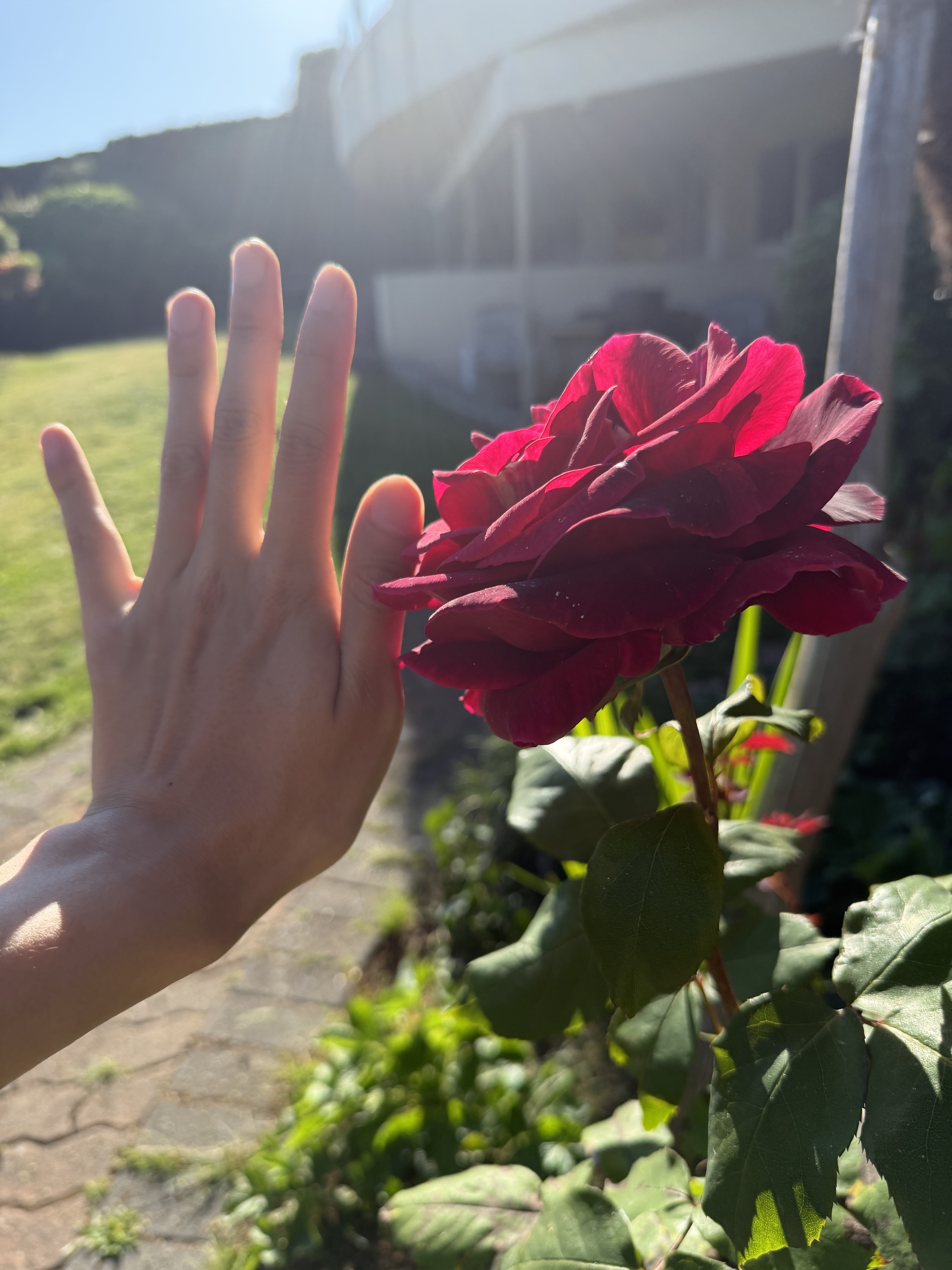
Showing bloom size

'Mister Lincoln' is a vigorous, tall upright shrub, 4 to 7 ft (121–213 cm) in height. Blooms are very large, 6 in (15 cm) or more in diameter, with 30 to 35 petals. The rose has a strong damask fragrance. The high-centered, deep red petals are generally borne singly on long stems and do not fade, even in the hottest climates. The shrub is a repeat bloomer. The buds are deep red and open up into large, velvety red, double blossoms. The foliage is dark red when young and becomes leathery and dark, matte green when the plant is older. It is generally healthy and heat tolerant, but is susceptible to blackspot. 'Mister Lincoln' is hardy to zone 5–9.

== See also ==
- Garden roses
- List of Award of Garden Merit roses
- Rose Hall of Fame

== General and cited references ==
- Quest-Ritson, Brigid; Quest-Ritson, Charles (2011). Encyclopedia of Roses (Reprint ed.). DK. ISBN 978-0756688684.
