= Mission Historical Park =

Public park in Santa Barbara, California, United States

Coordinates: 34.437601°N 119.712206°W

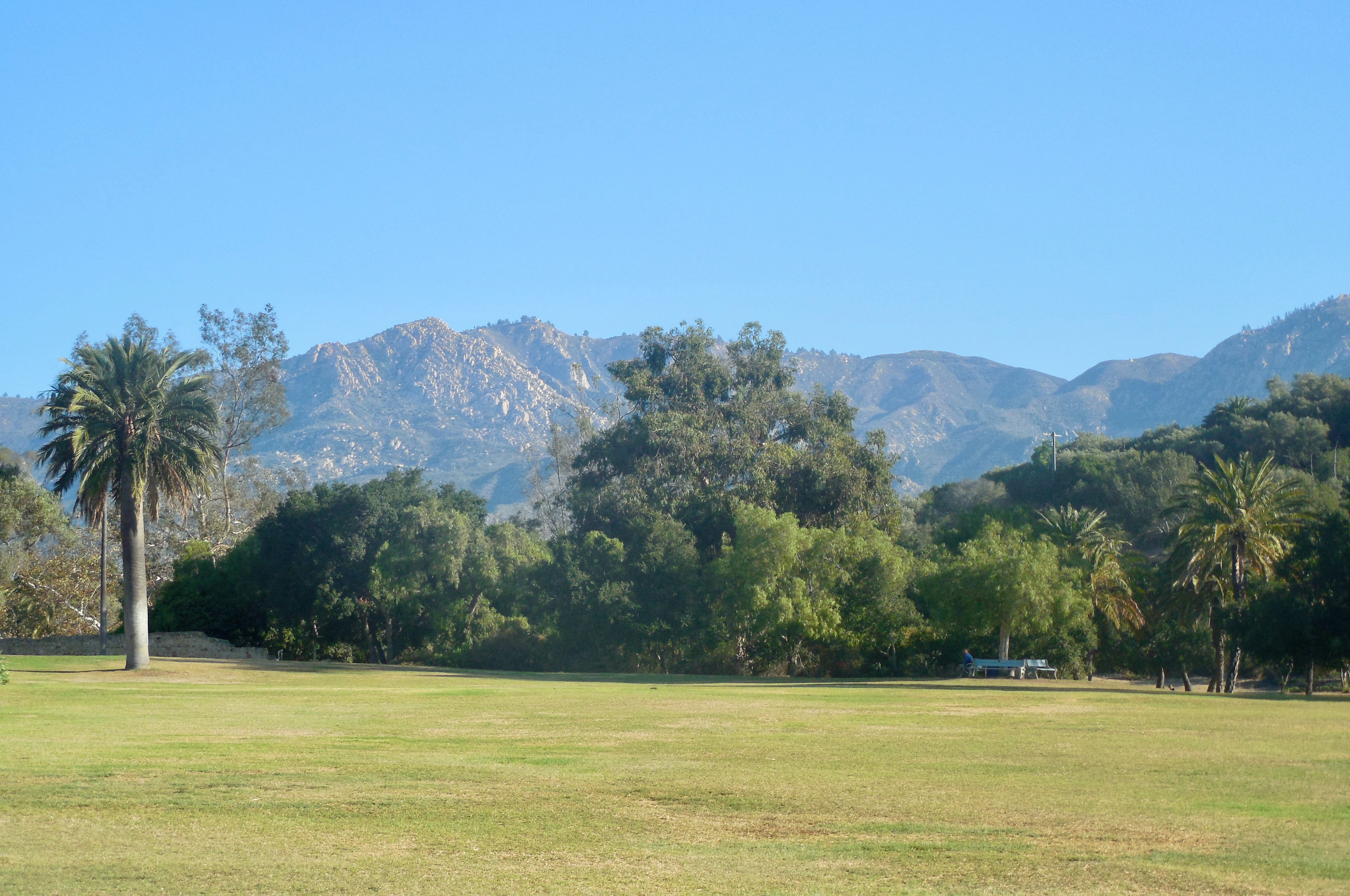
- Grassy area of Mission Historical Park in Santa Barbara looking northeast toward the Santa Ynez Mountains
- Interactive map of Mission Historical Park
- Location: Intersection of East Los Olivos St. and Laguna St. in Santa Barbara, California; Due east of the Santa Barbara Mission
- Area: 10 acres (4 ha)
- Created: 1928-1948
- Operator: City of Santa Barbara Parks & Recreation Department
- Website: Mission Historical Park

Mission Historical Park is a 10-acre park (4.0 ha) located to the east of the Santa Barbara Mission in Santa Barbara, California. The park hosts a large open grassy area, the A.C. Postel Memorial Rose Garden, a fountain, hiking trails, a variety of sycamore and native oak trees, a historic olive grove dedicated to World War I veterans, remains of tannery vats, a pottery, gristmill, and a historic reservoir and aqueduct system. The park and the Mission were designated as a California State Historical Landmark on July 12, 1939 (No. 309).

The park is divided by Alameda Padré Serra, a major access roadway that has an Average Annual Daily Traffic (AADT) of about 9,900 vehicles. The perimeter of the park's 8-acre southern area extends from the intersection of East Los Olivos St. and Laguna St. north to Alameda Padré Serra, and east to Plaza del Rubio. The smaller northern 2-acre portion occupies the area between Alameda Padré Serra, Mountain Drive and Mission Ridge Road at the park's northern terminus.

== Park history ==
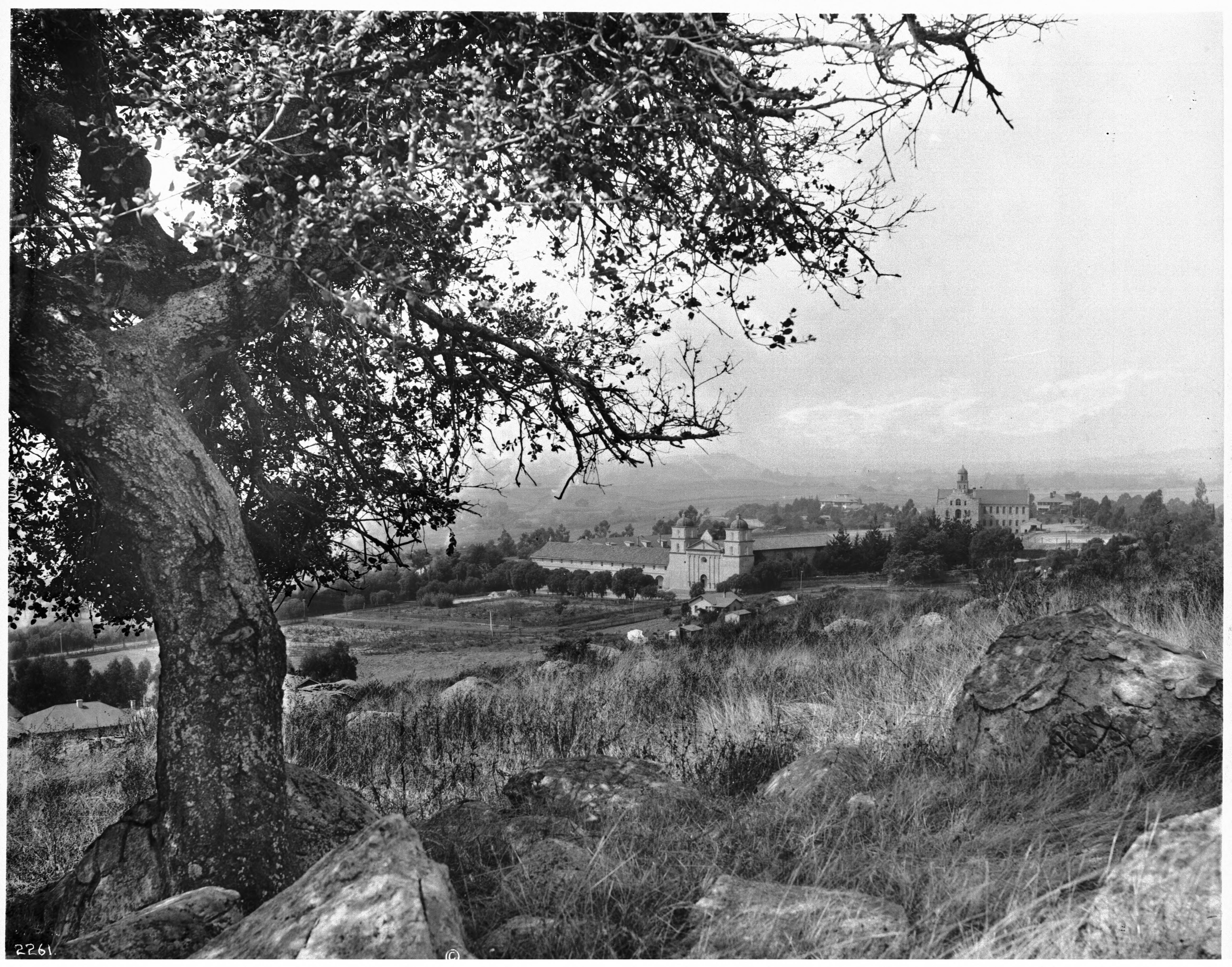
View of the Mission (and future park land), circa 1901-04

Following the 1925 Santa Barbara earthquake and post-restoration efforts made to the Santa Barbara Mission, the Franciscan Fathers of California offered to sell a 7.8 acre parcel of land extending from Laguna and East Los Olivos Streets north to Alameda Padré Serra. After securing private contributions, on June 30, 1928, the City Council agreed to purchase the land for $37,000 (to be paid over several years). By 1939, a total sum of $53,068.80 was paid in full (which included interest and other expenses). A master plan was approved by the Board of Park Commissioners in 1940.

In 1948, the remainder of the land comprising the present day park (the 2-acre parcel between Alameda Padré Serra and Mission Ridge Road) was gifted to the city by the Franciscan Fathers.

In 1954, the City developed a plan indicating a straightened Los Olivos Street through the park. The local citizenry and a number of organizations "vigorously objected" to the proposal. In March of that year, the City Council changed the name of the park from Mission Plaza (or Park) to Mission Historical Park, which had been suggested by Miss Pearl Chase five years previous.

By 1970, the City Park Commissioners once again called for a redesign of the park and surrounding streets.

== The A.C. Postel Memorial Rose Garden ==
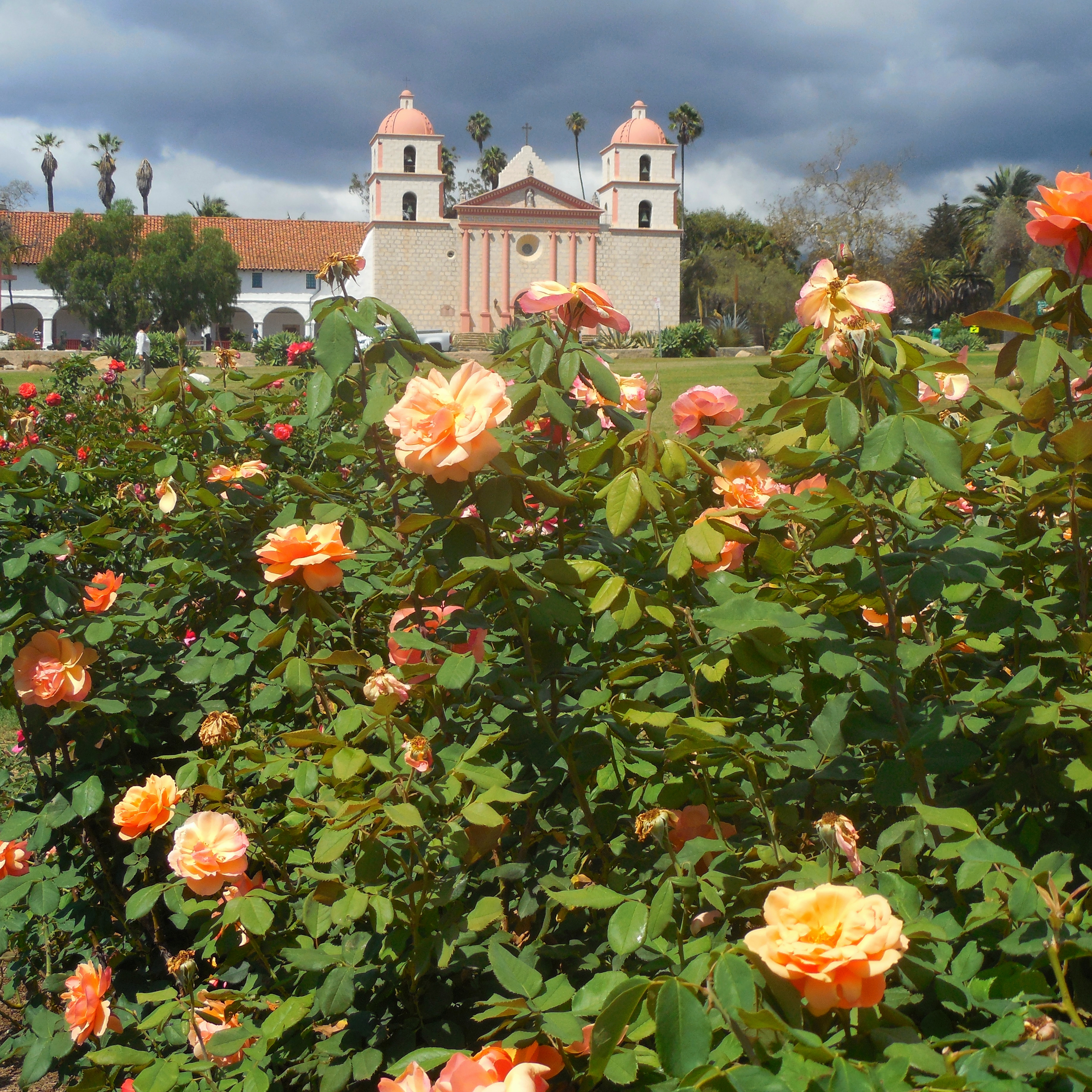
View of the Mission from the Rose Garden

The A.C. Postel Memorial Rose Garden is an accredited show garden of the All-America Rose Selections (AARS). The garden was initiated in 1955 with a donation of 500 pedigree rose bushes. In 1959, the non-profit Santa Barbara Rose Society was established. By 1961 the condition of the rose garden had deteriorated such that the Rose Society requested to sponsor it. In the following years, new bushes were established. In 1971, the Little Garden Club installed a fragrance garden for the blind. By the late 1970s, California Proposition 13 had substantially reduced funding for the Parks Department and thereby eliminated the full-time rose gardener's position. Remaining volunteers were unable to adequately maintain the garden and it hence deteriorated. In 1980, there had been considerations to replace the rose beds with tennis courts. However, in 1982 a committee was formed to save the rose garden. By 1984, the Virginia Firth Wade Endowment Fund donated $35,000 of the $51,000 needed to restore the garden on the condition that it be renamed; the A.C. Postel Memorial Rose Garden.

Today the garden holds over 1,500 plants sits and serves as one of over 130 recognized competitive demonstration rose gardens in the US, hosting a variety of roses including a number of All-America Rose Selections (AARS) winners. An annual $5,000 grant from the Virginia Firth Wade Endowment Fund assists with the garden's maintenance, which includes; a part-time gardener, watering, grooming, and regular fertilization.

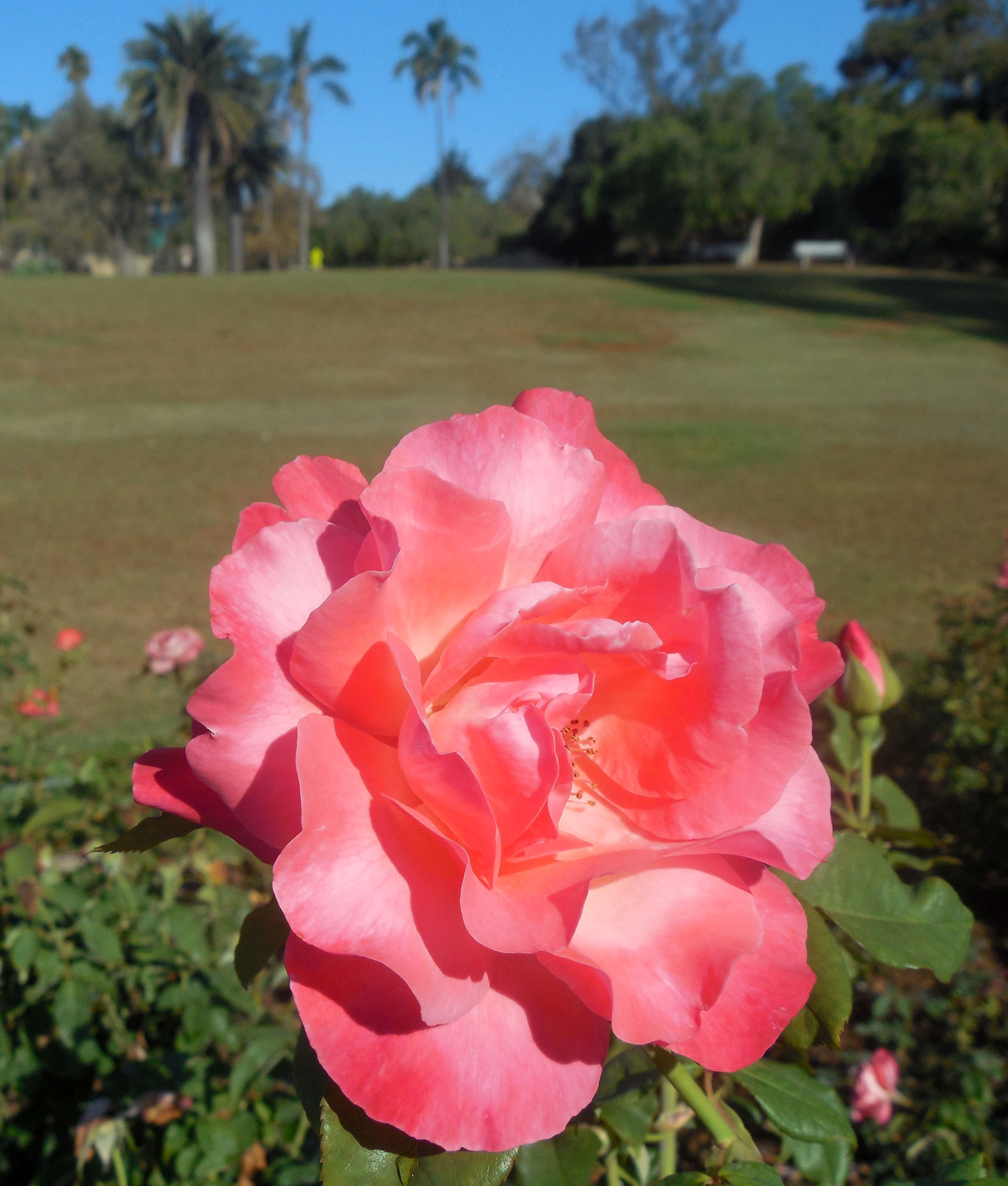
"Color Magic" rose (introduced in 1978)

The garden is often utilized for wedding ceremonies in two locations; the open grassy section along its western side (which accommodates up to 200 people), or at a smaller area on the northern end of the garden along Plaza del Rubio Street (which accommodates up to 50 people).

=== Rose collections ===
A number of the Rose cultivar which have been cultivated within the garden (and listed by the All American Rose Selection Committee - AARS) include, but are not limited to; Chicago Peace (1962), China Doll (AARS 1946), Color Magic, Double Delight, Duet (AARS 1961), Iceberg, Just Joey, Over The Moon, Peace, Perfume Delight, Rainbow Sorbet, Scentimental, Sunshine Daydream (an AARS 2012 winner), Strike It Rich, Tahitian Sunset, Walking on Sunshine (an AARS 2011 winner), and Betty Boop (AARS 1999). Some of the rose cultivars named after people within the garden include; Barbra Streisand (AARS 2000), Henry Fonda (AARS 1995), Julia Child (2004), and Marilyn Monroe (AARS 2003).

Additionally, the collection hosts beds with ancient varieties, such as Gallicas, Albas, and Damasks in various states of health. Other roses maintained within the garden include Old Garden Roses, Hybrid Perpetuals originally cultivated during the 1800s, and Chinas (e.g. Mutabulis and Old Blush from 1752).

== Grassy area ==
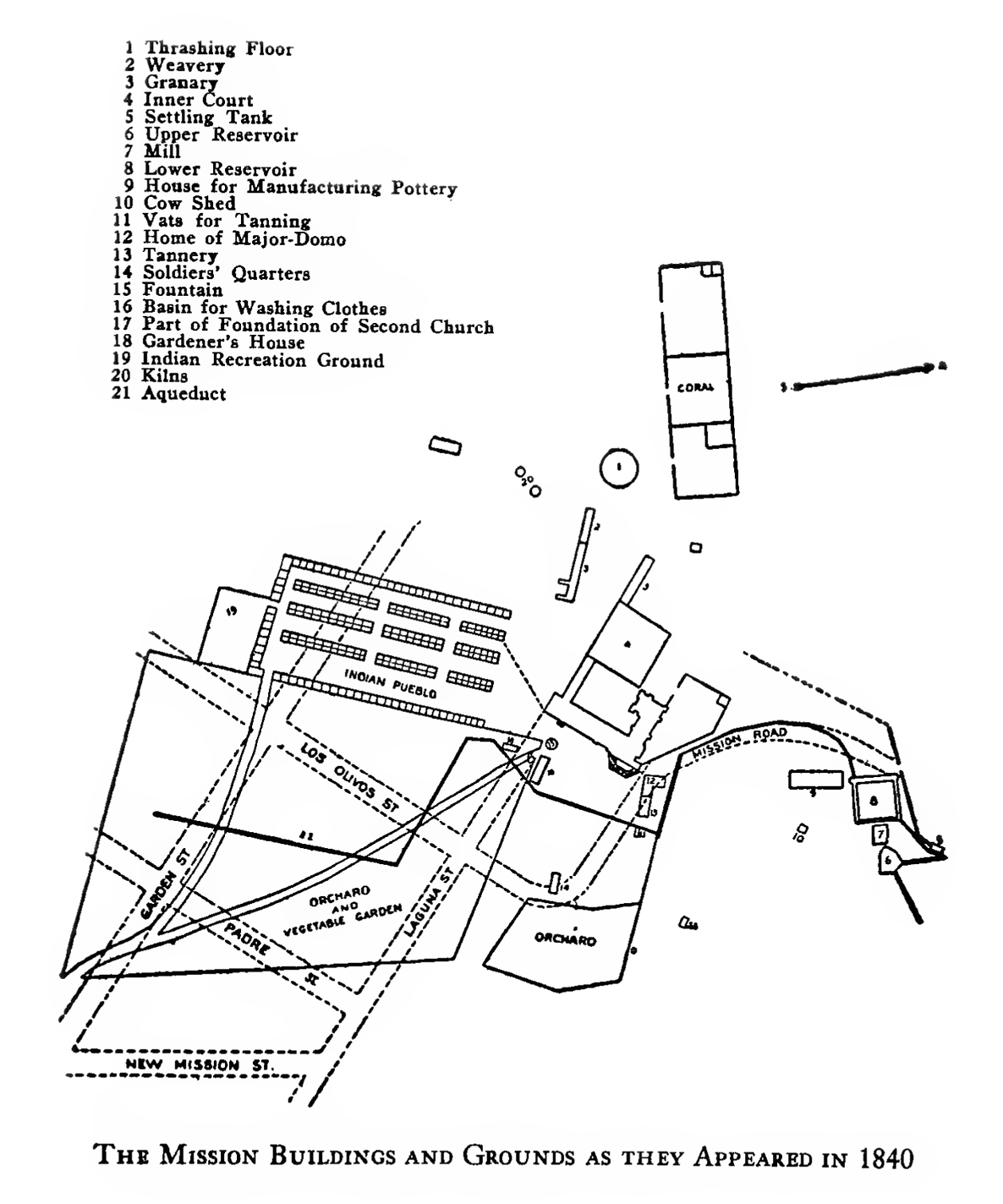
Location of the orchard (and other features) during 1840

The park's grassy area encompasses roughly half of the original southern 8-acre parcel that was sold to the City in 1928.

During 1840, a three-acre orchard consisting of pear, apple, apricot, fig and other fruit trees existed about 100-yards in front of the Mission (i.e. the present day location of the grassy area which abuts East Los Olivos Street). By the early 1900s, the orchard had diminished considerably.

"The fruit trees gradually died or were removed, until fifteen years ago there were only three standing. Now there is but one, which is still vigorous, though its bark is moss covered and its branches are much overgrown."

— Hawley, Walter A., The Early Days of Santa Barbara California, 1909

The orchard was surrounded by a six-sided wall reinforced with "heavy buttresses of masonry". A portion of the northern section and eastern corner of the wall were still in place during 1910–20.

== Historical waterworks and production facilities ==
Much of the historical infrastructure within the park had been constructed by Chumash people who were often subject to the California Missions under the exploitative Mission industry system of the period. Some of the facilities and their functions are further described below.

=== Upper reservoir and grist mill ===
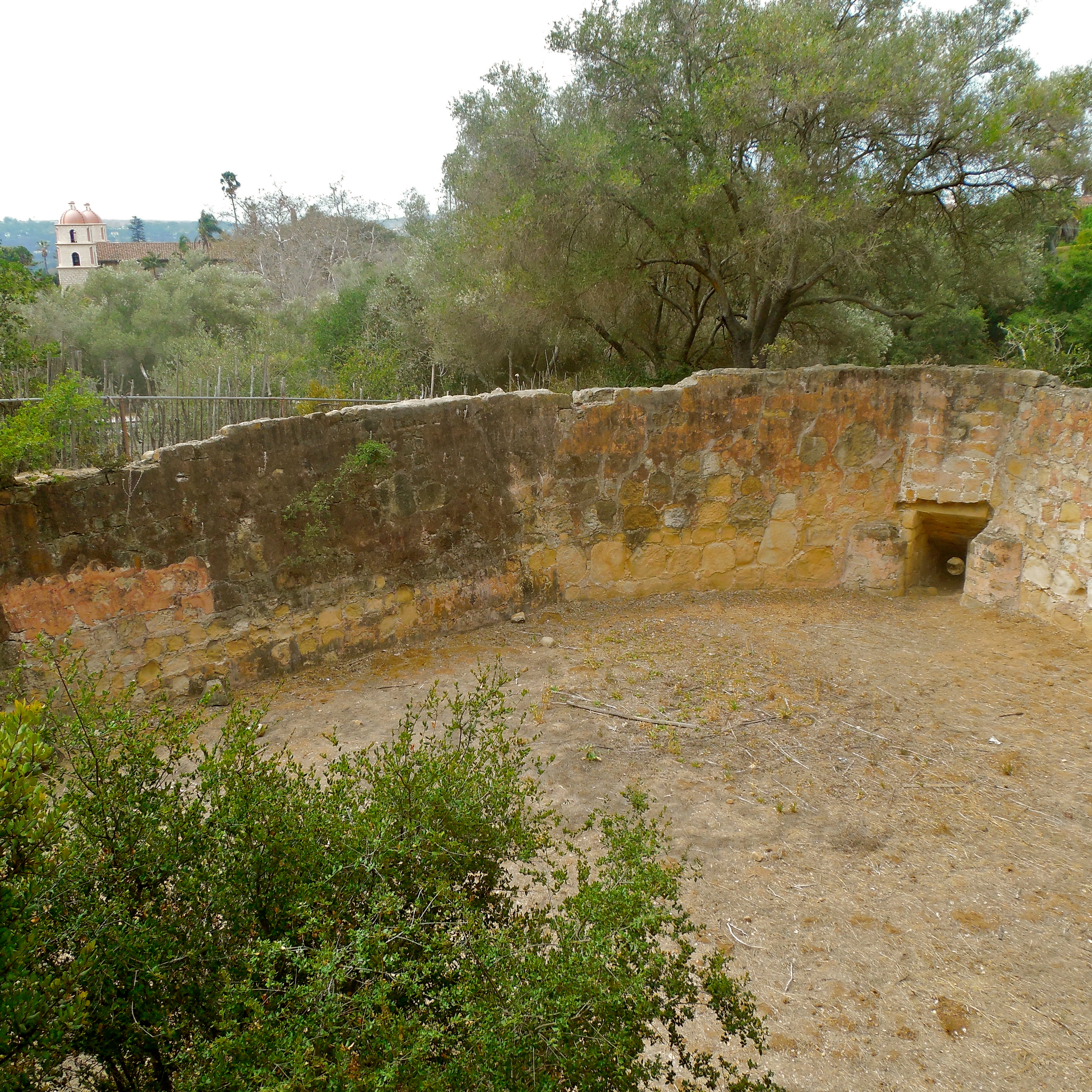
View of the Upper Reservoir and penstock leading to the Grist Mill below, 2015

Around 1827, a water-powered grist mill and its adjacent reservoir were constructed by the Chumash laborers under the direction of Fr. Antonio Ripoll. The hexagon-shaped sandstone reservoir was paved with bricks and plastered with pink-hued cement. The ruins of the 31 ft (9.45 m) grist mill remain. Signage in the park indicate that water was introduced into the mill via a wooden-gated penstock. A customized clay pipe then allowed for water to flow downward at a 35 degree angle against the buckets of the mill's water wheel, thus causing it to rotate and generate power for the millstones to grind grain into flour. The water then proceeded from the mill to the lower reservoir where it was channeled to irrigate fields, orchards, and the fountain.

=== Filter house ===
Abutting the upper reservoir to its north are the ruins of a filter house, which purified water for domestic purposes. The incoming water flowed through a concoction of charcoal and sandstone before it was channeled via an aqueduct to the lower reservoir.

=== Lower reservoir ===
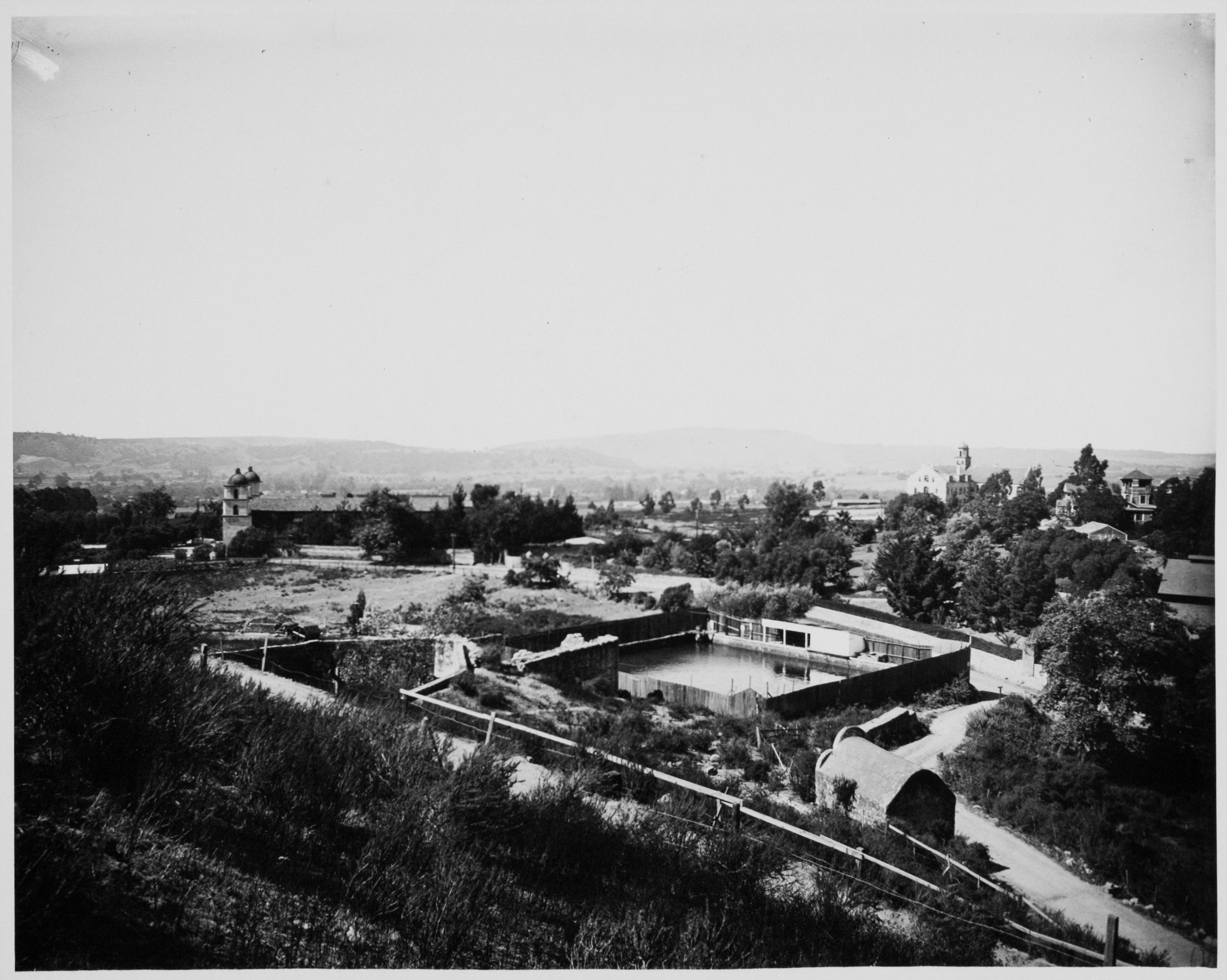
View of the upper reservoir (left), the derelict gristmill, and the municipal reservoir (right) still in use, circa 1898

In 1806, a square stone reservoir was constructed as part of an irrigation system providing water for the Mission's orchards and gardens. Originally measuring 7 ft (2.13 m) deep with an area of 110 ft^{2}, the reservoir was capable of holding some 535,000 gallons of water. Located north of Almeda Padre Serra within Mission Park, this reservoir was well-crafted enough to be utilized by the city for water storage until 1993. It was hence transferred from the Public Works Department to the Parks Department to serve as part of Mission Historical Park.

=== Aqueduct ===
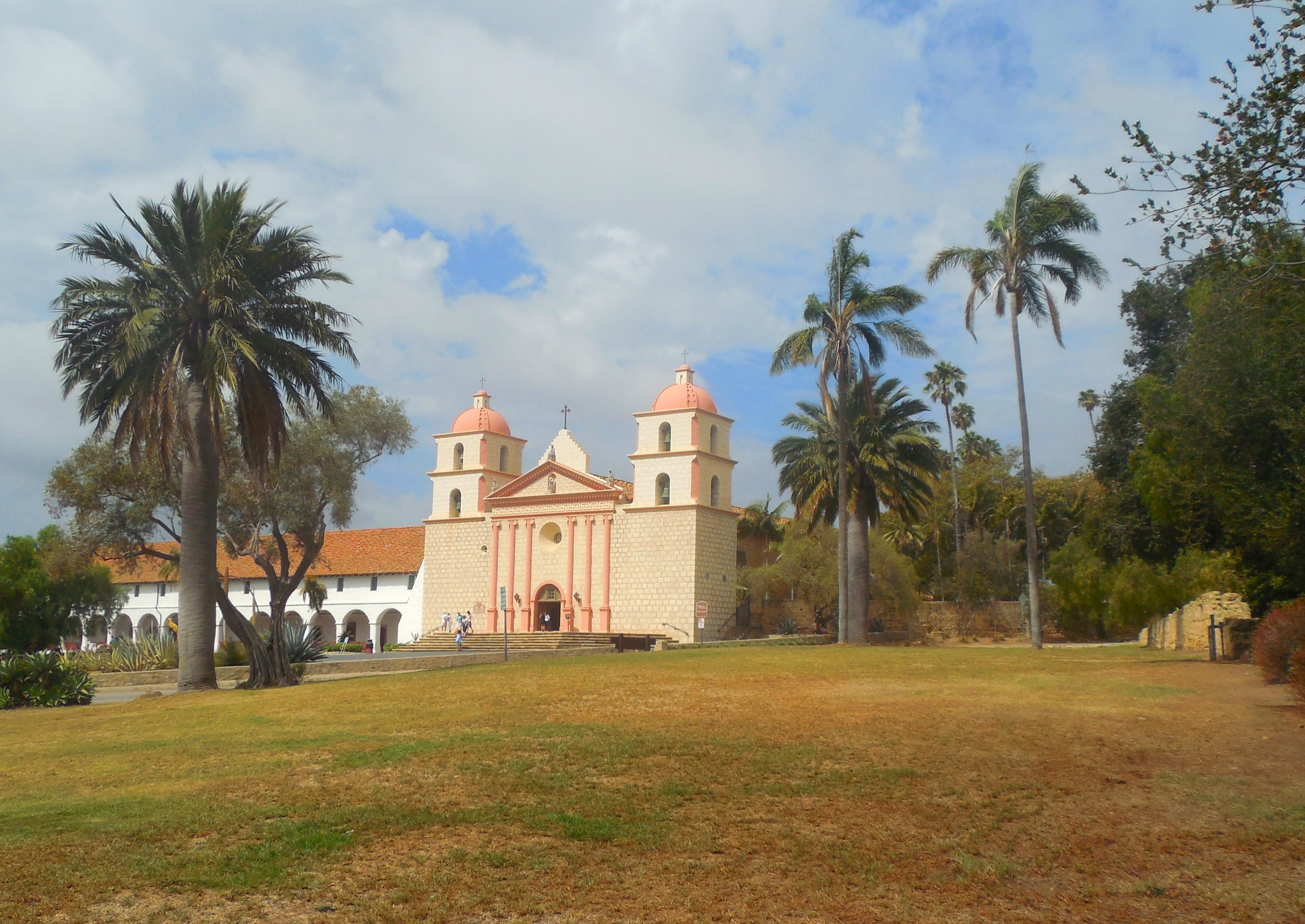
View of the Mission and the aqueduct wall (right) from Mission Park's grassy area

In 1807, a dam and complementary aqueduct system was constructed in Mission Canyon to supply water to the residents of the Mission. One dam was built across the west fork of Mission Creek (formerly Pedregosa Creek), approximately 1.5 miles north of the Santa Barbara Mission. Another was built across the east fork of the creek, located about 3 miles from the Mission. A remaining portion of the lower aqueduct wall still exists north of the grassy area within the park.

=== Tannery ===
The Tannery housed the massive stone vats containing treatment chemicals that were used to convert animal hides into leather. The leather product was used to manufacture horse saddles, footwear, and other leather accessories.

=== Pottery ===
The Pottery is located at just north of the intersection of Alameda Padre Serra and East Los Olivos Street. Built in 1808, the facility was where the Chumash workers produced tiles, water pipes, and cooking pottery. In 1914, a portion of the pottery was destroyed in order to construct the Alameda Padre Serra roadway.

== Gallery ==
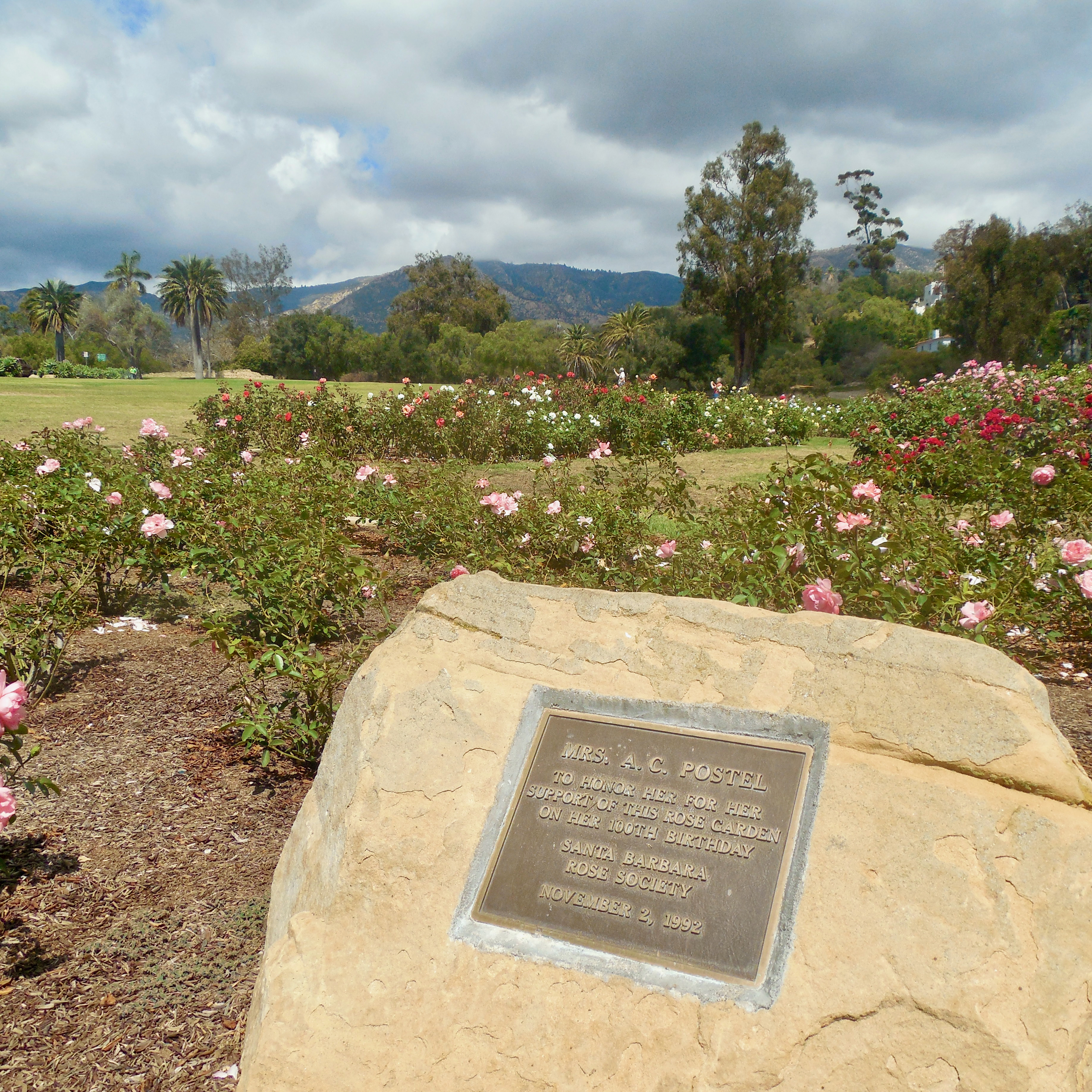
Commemoration plaque for the rose garden

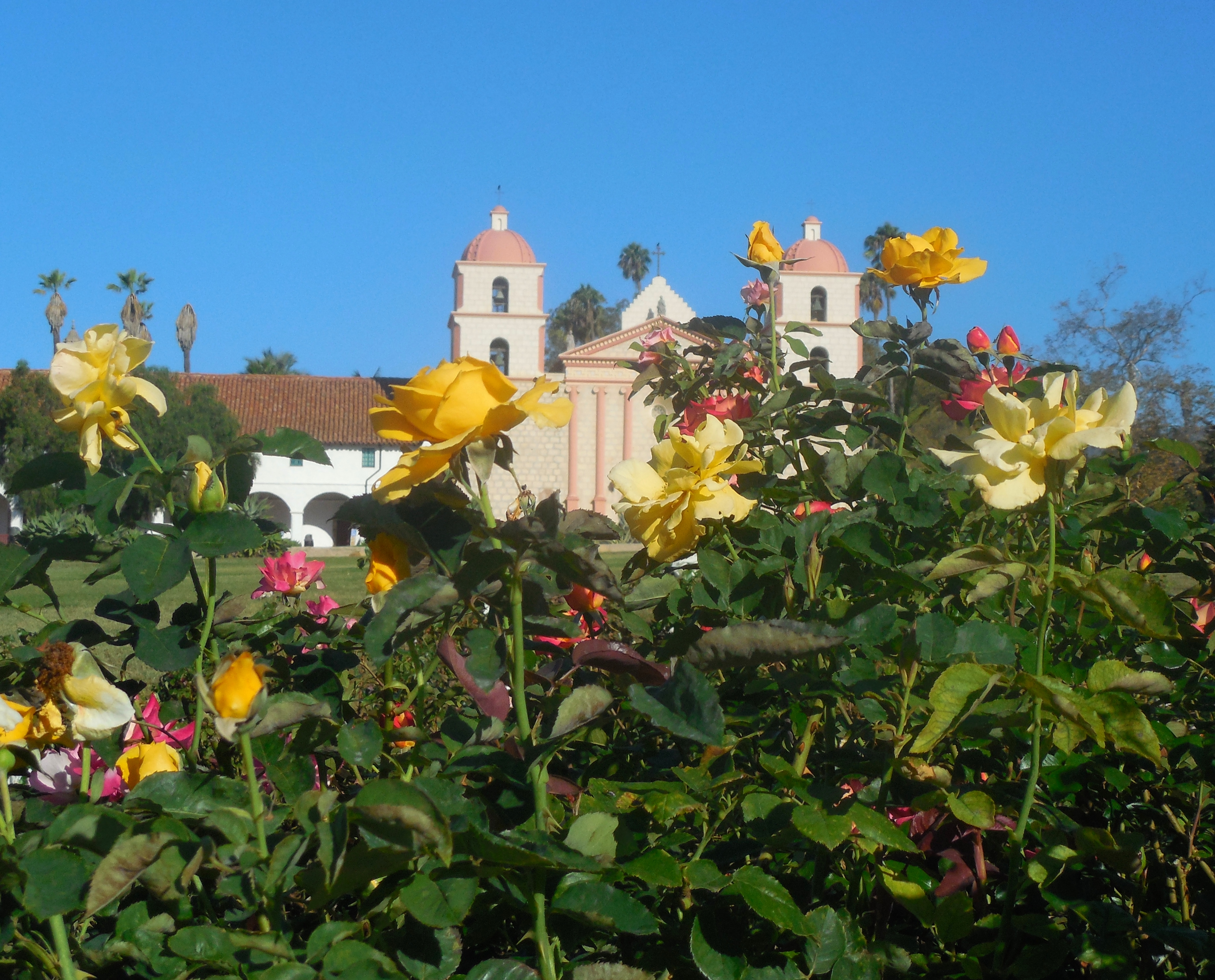
View of the Santa Barbara Mission from the Rose Garden

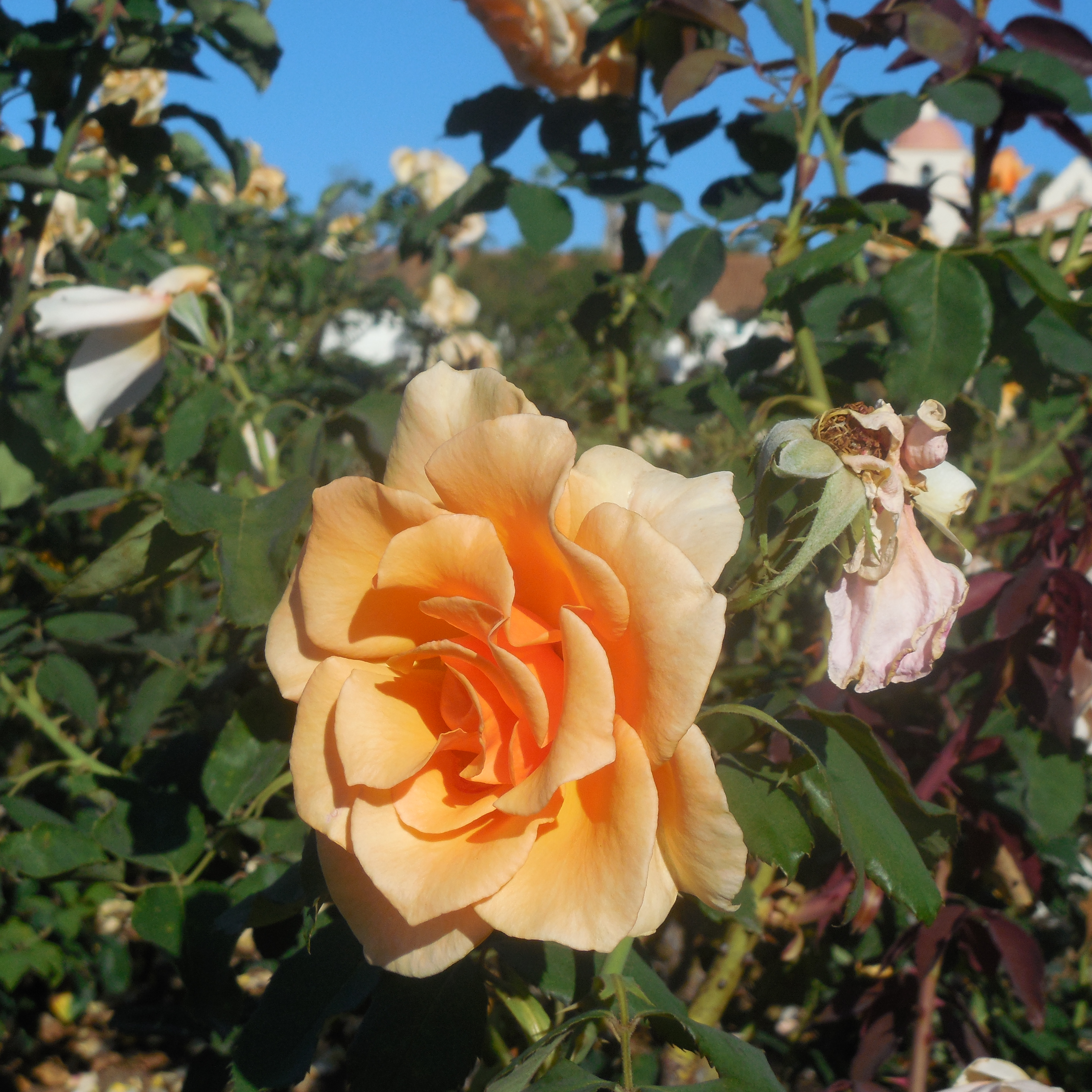
"Just Joey" (AARS 1972) cultivar rose within the garden

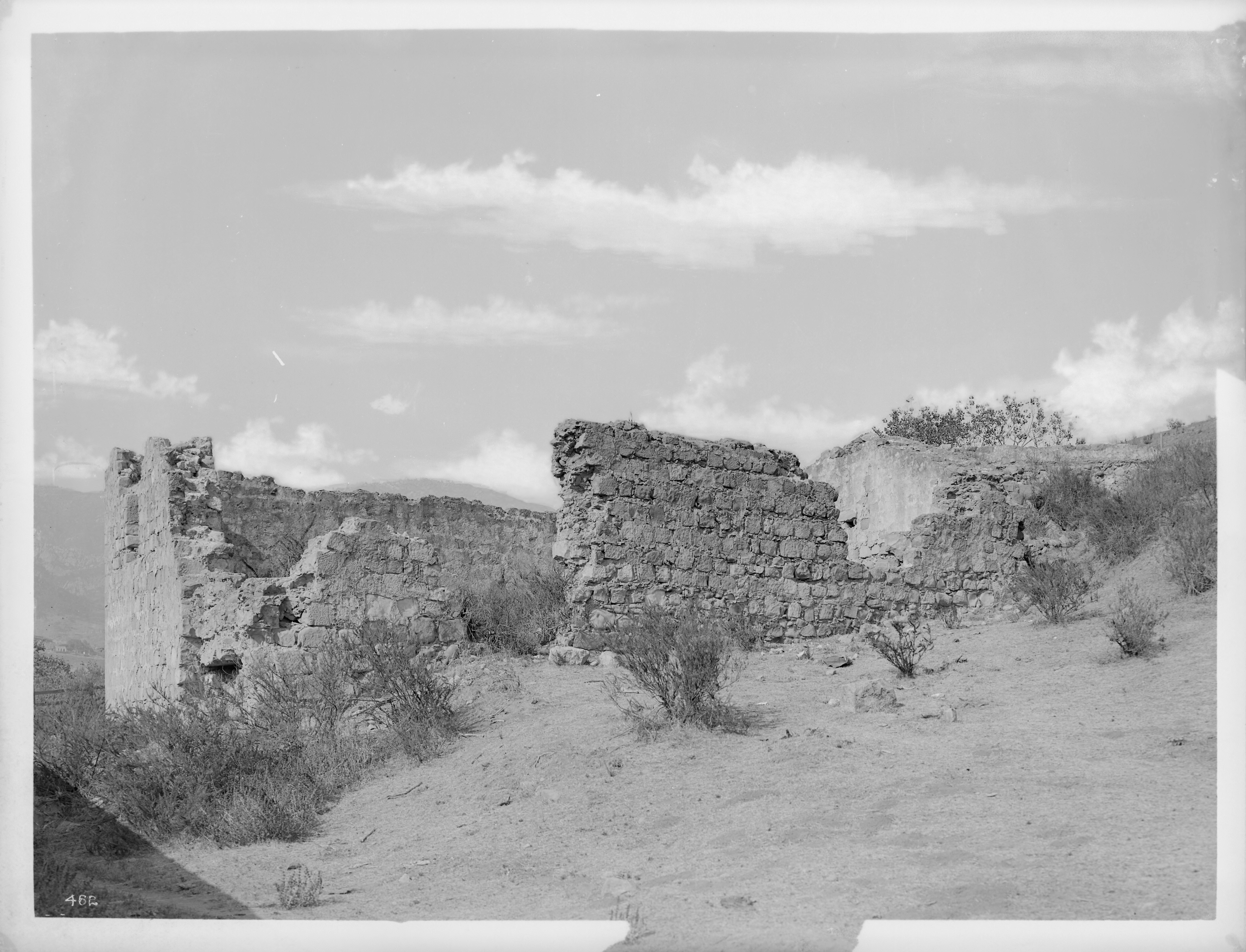
The ruins of the grist mill, 1898

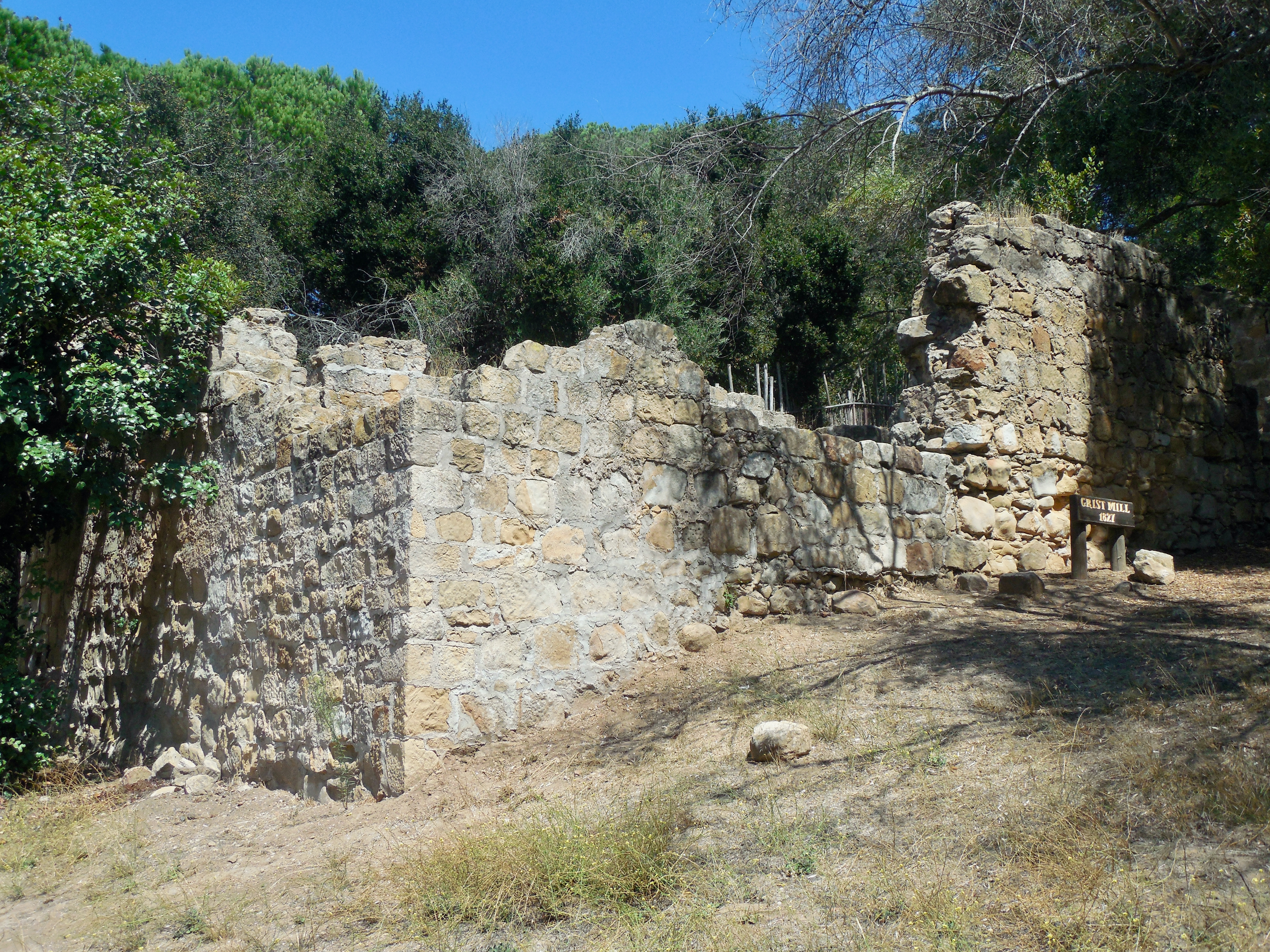
The ruins of the grist mill, 2017

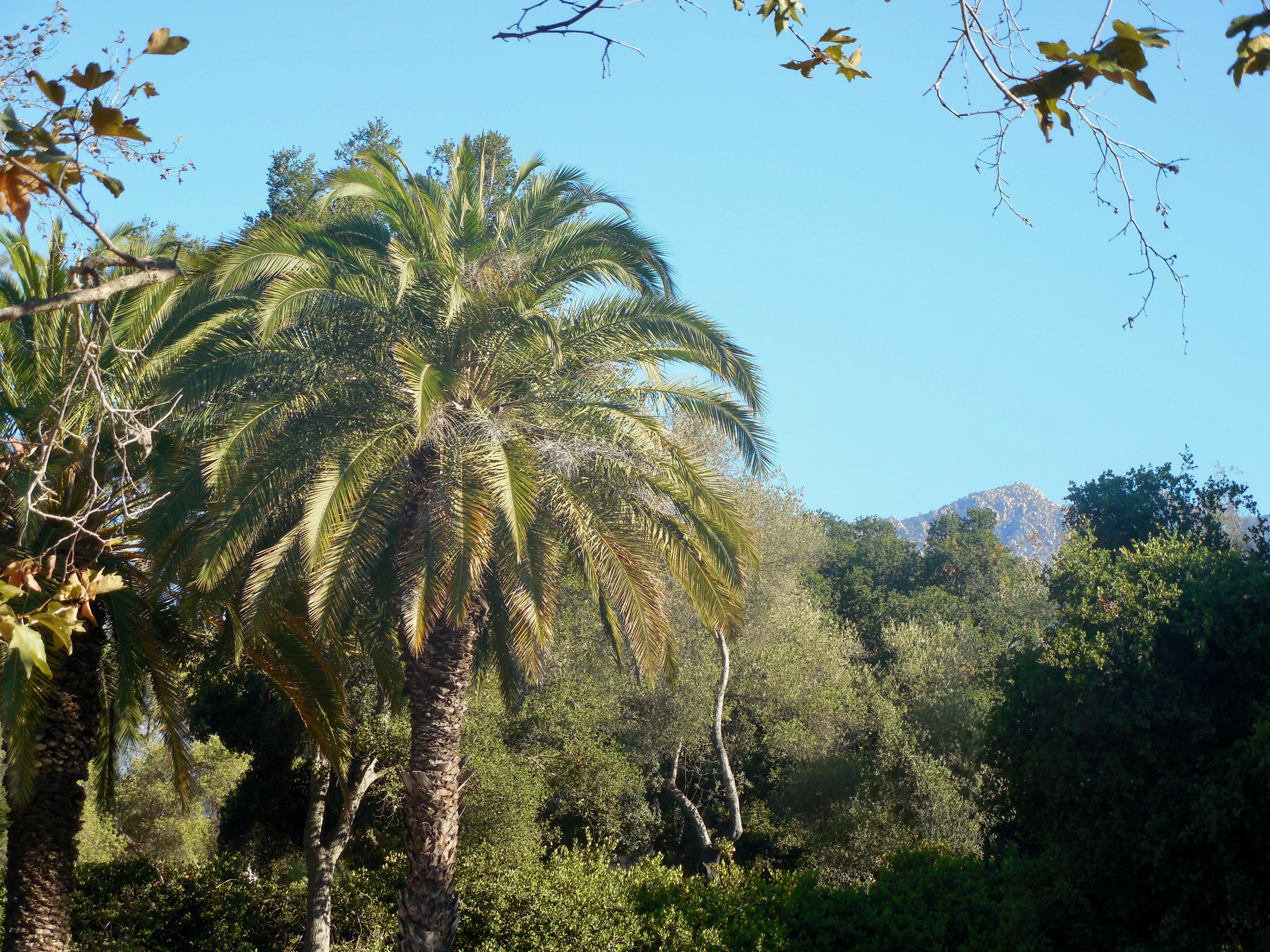
Northerly view of a Santa Ynez peak from the park.

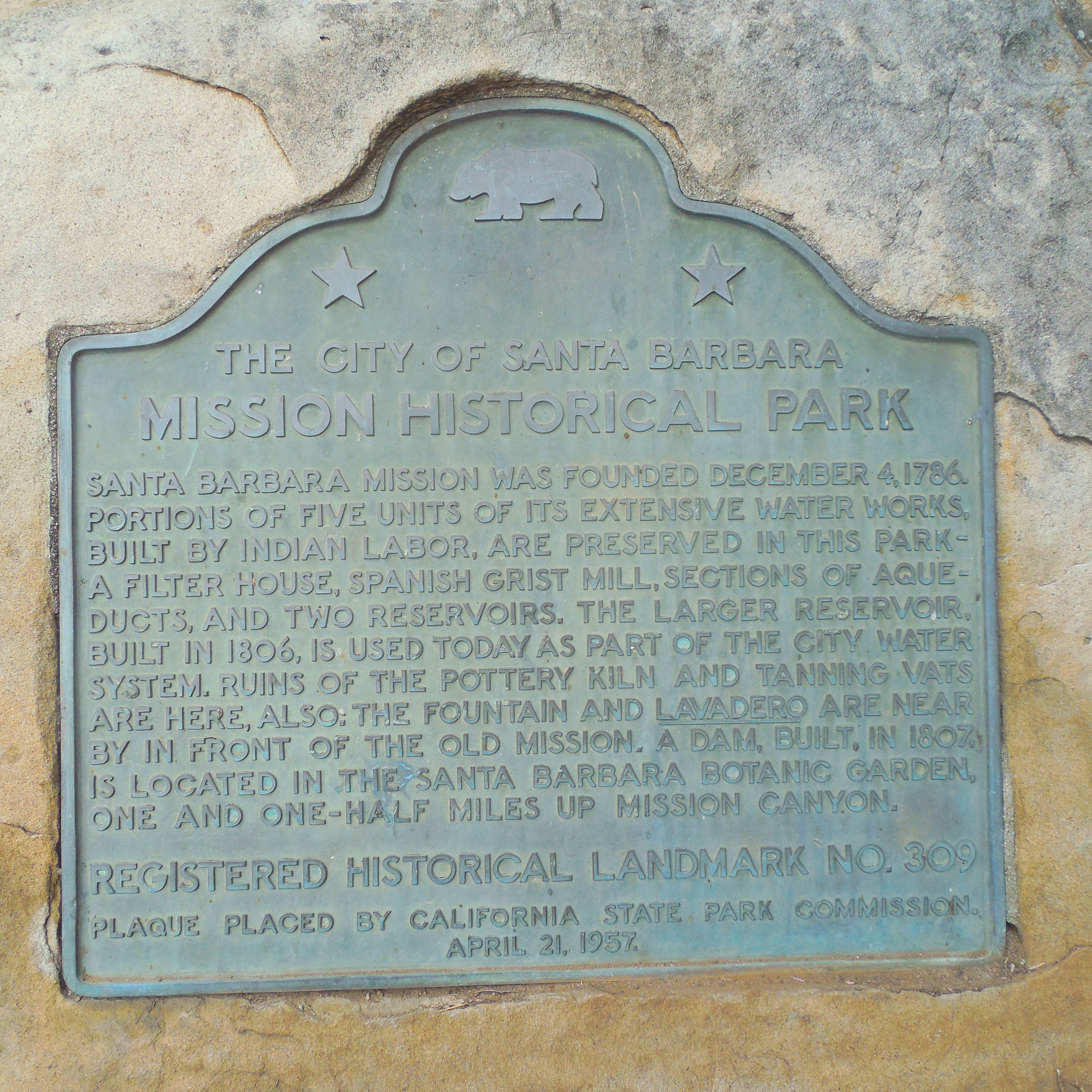
Plaque adjacent to the historic waterworks infrastructure

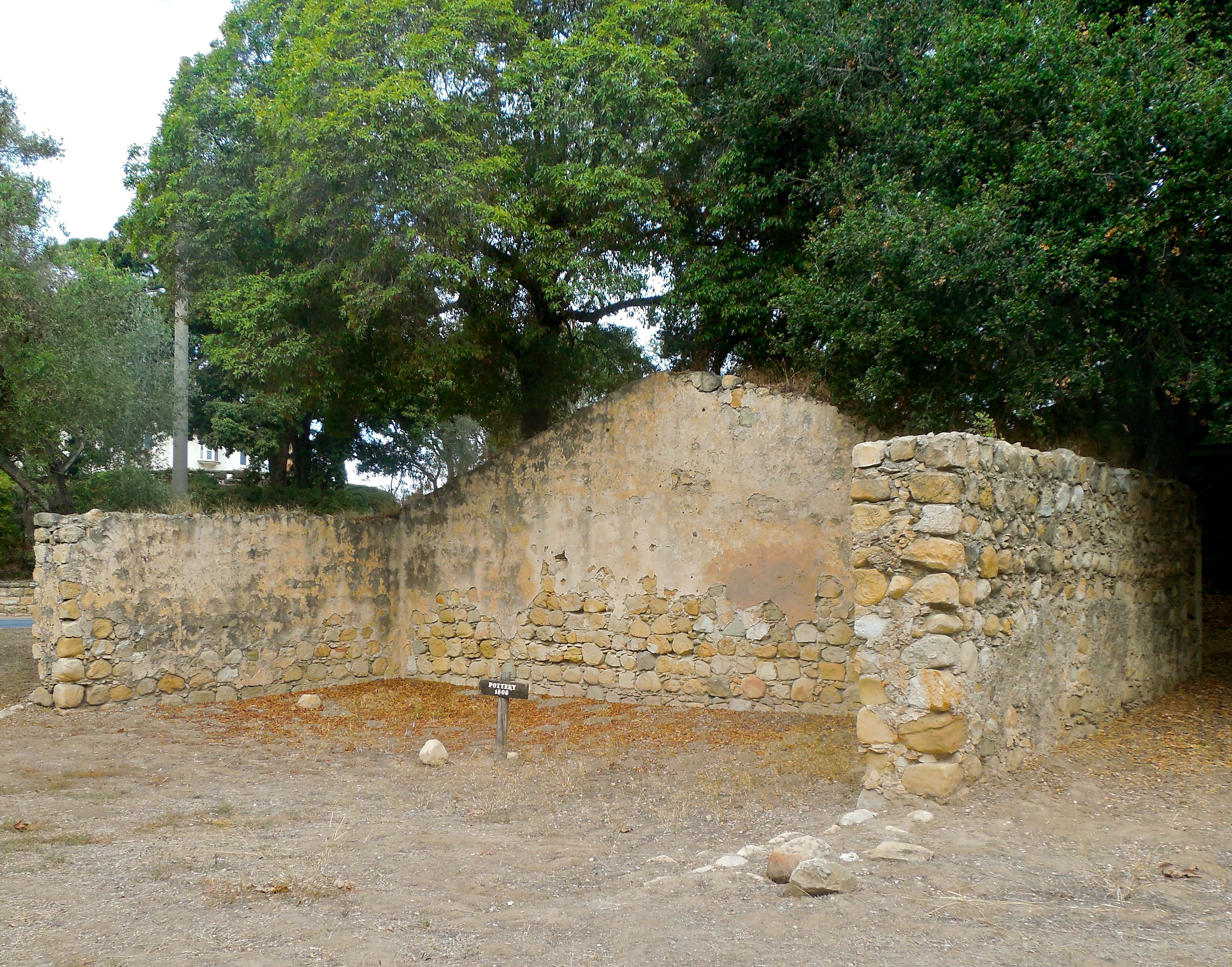
The Pottery located just east of E. Los Olivos Street

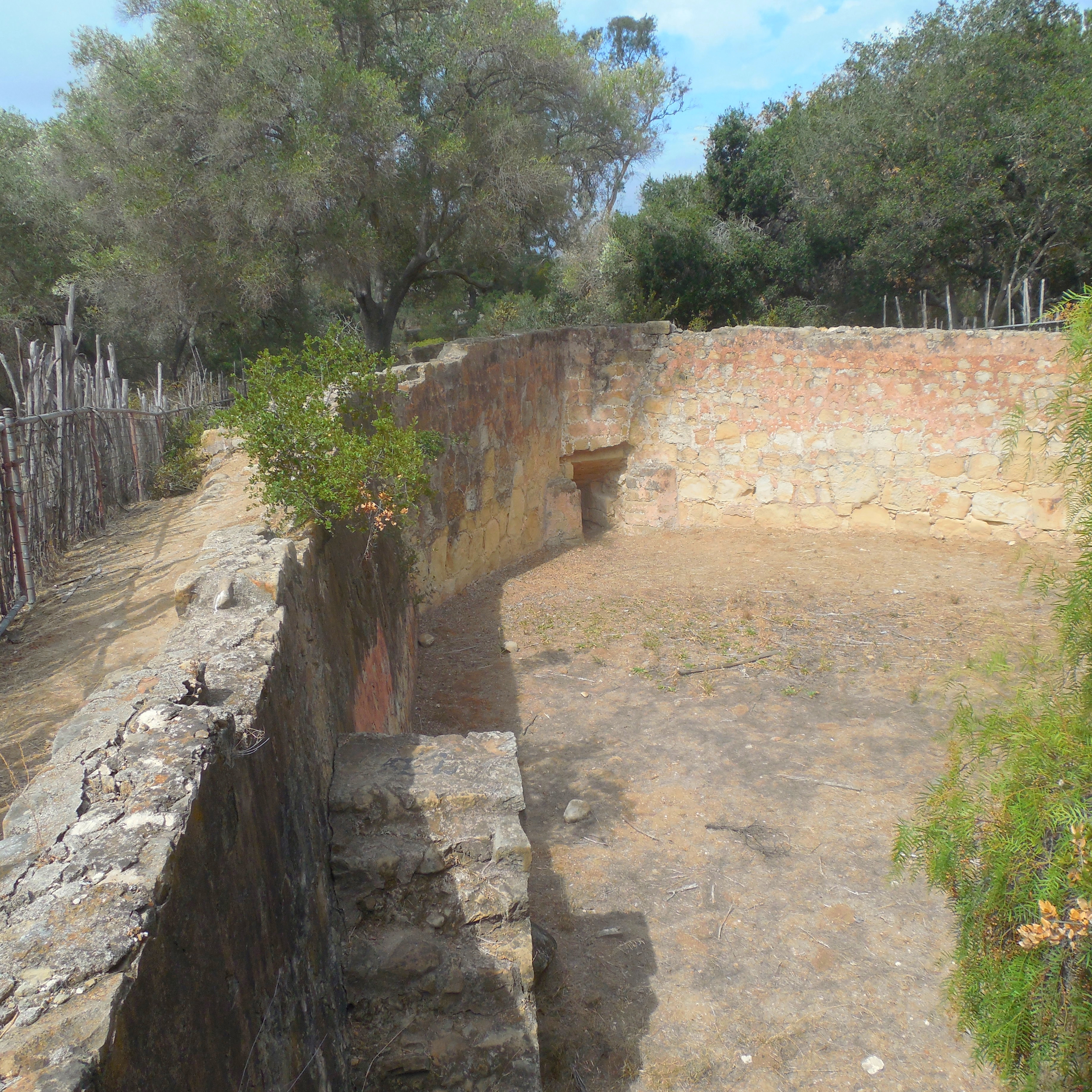
Western view of the upper reservoir

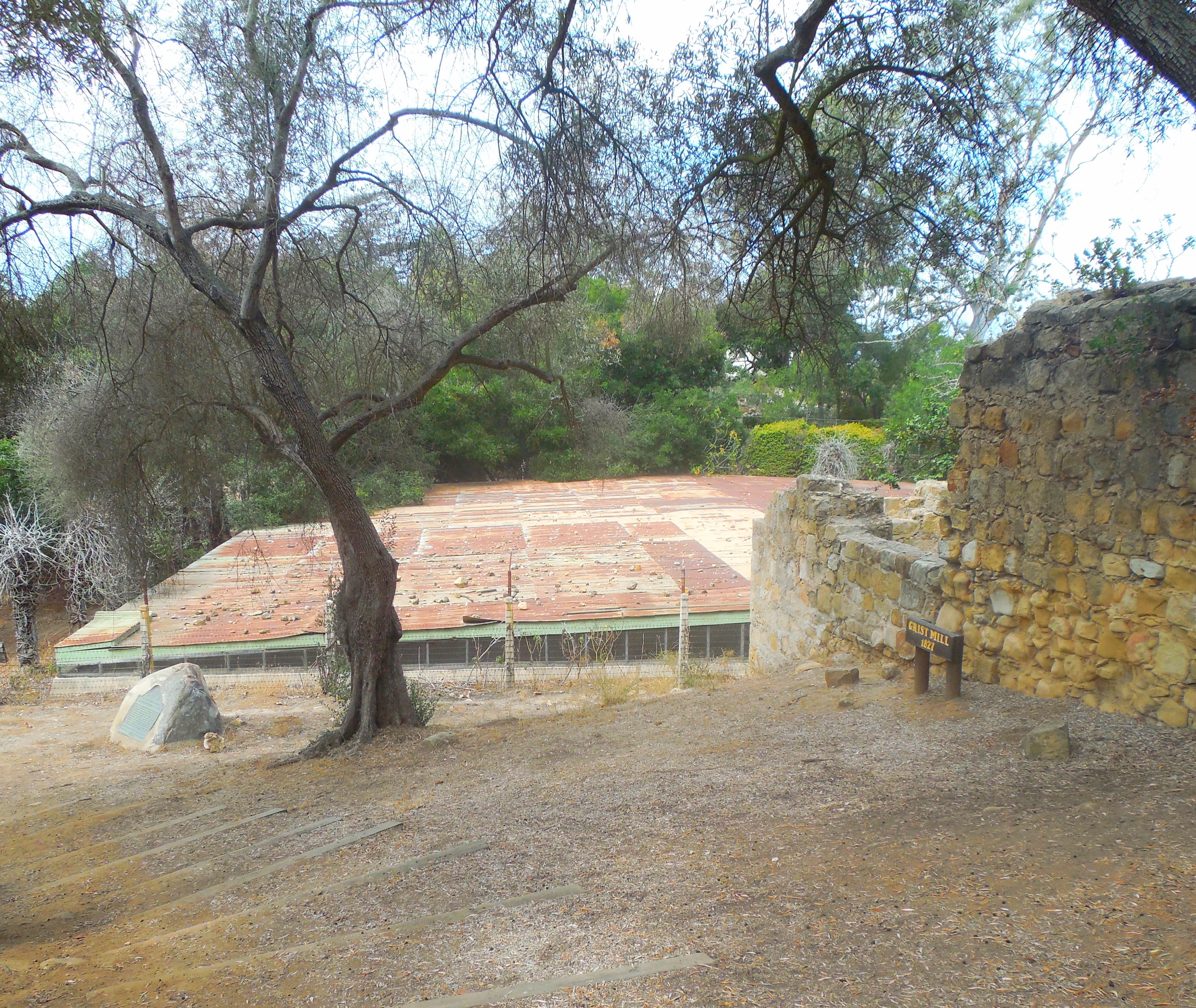
Lower reservoir adjacent to the historic grist mill ruins (right), 2015

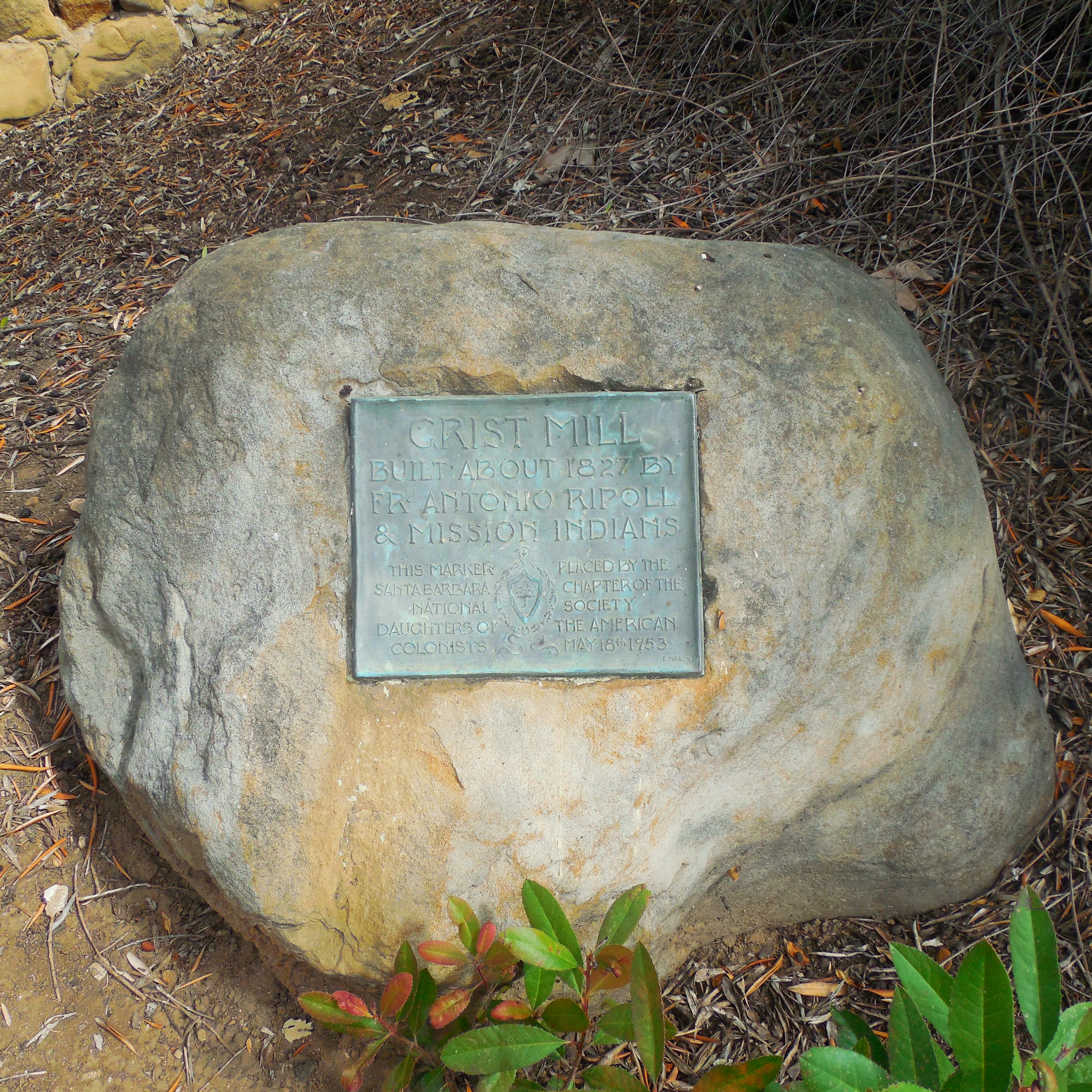
Historic plaque documenting the 1827 grist mill

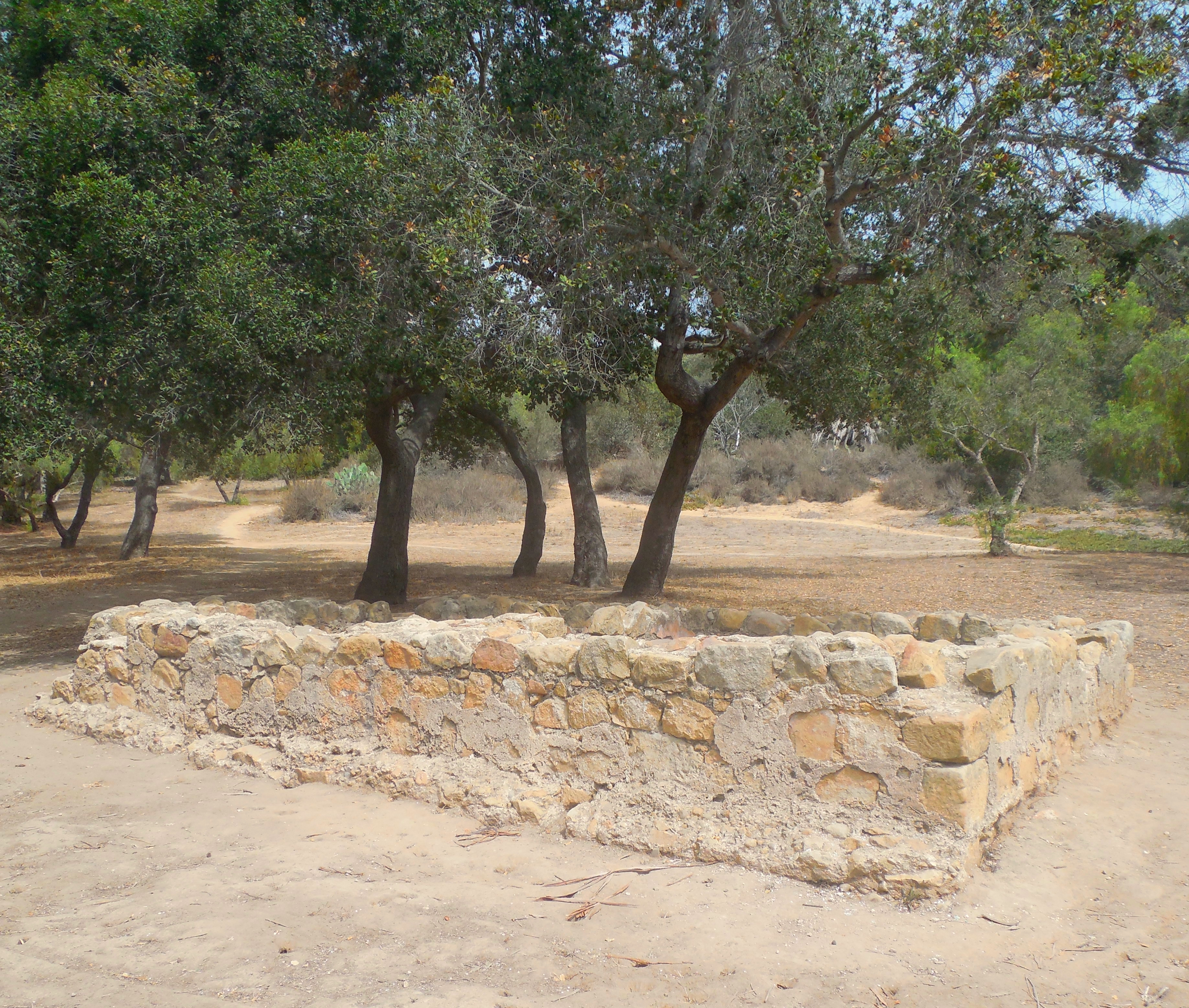
Unidentified historic building foundation within the park (possibly a guardhouse)
