= Rosa 'Garden Party' =

Rose cultivar

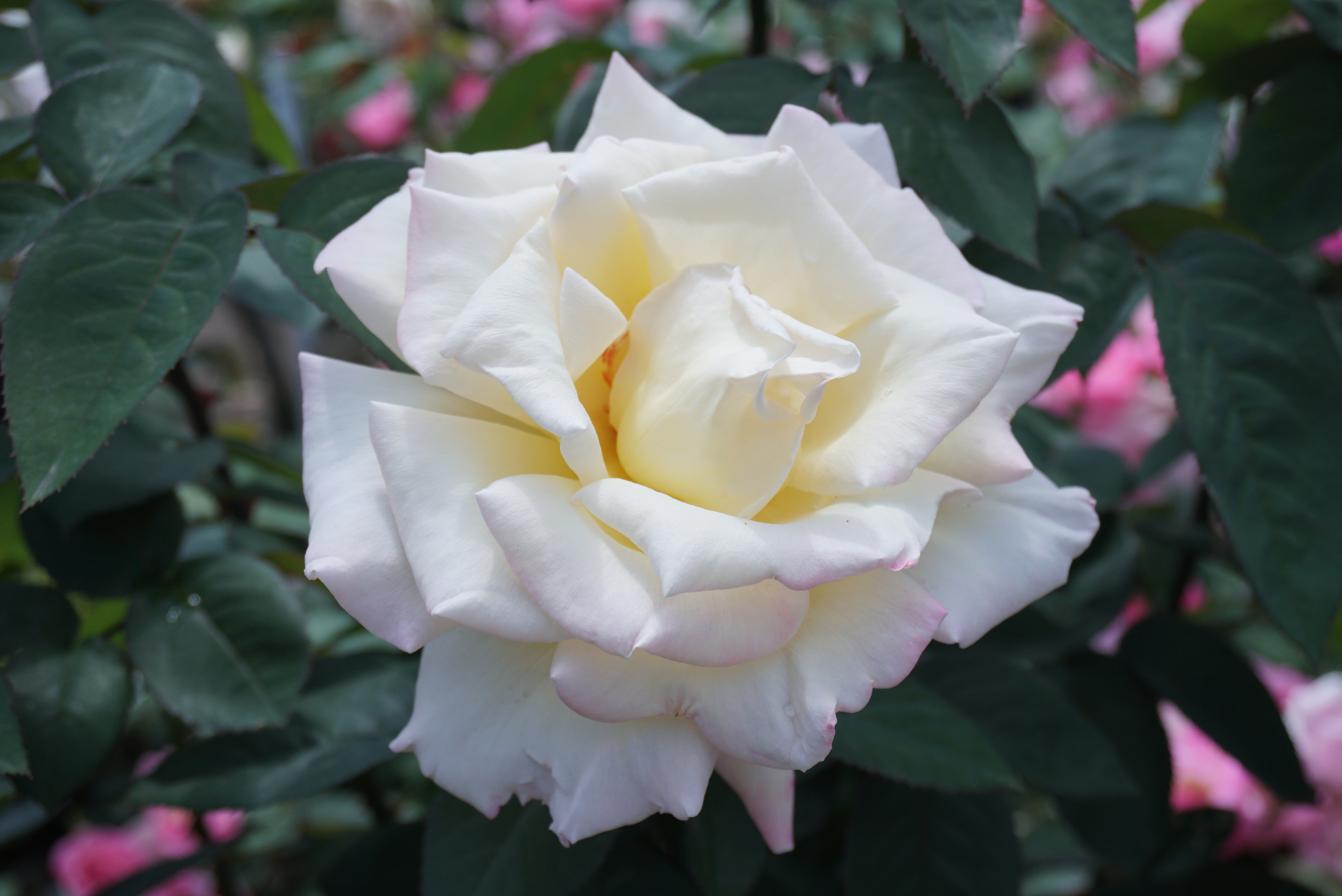
- Hybrid parentage: 'Charlotte Armstrong' × 'Peace'
- Cultivar group: Hybrid Tea
- Cultivar: Garden Party rose
- Origin: Herbert C. Swim, 1959

Rosa 'Garden Party' is an ivory hybrid tea rose cultivar created by Herbert C. Swim in 1959. Its parents are the hybrid teas 'Charlotte Armstrong' (Lammerts, 1940) and 'Peace' (Meilland, 1939).

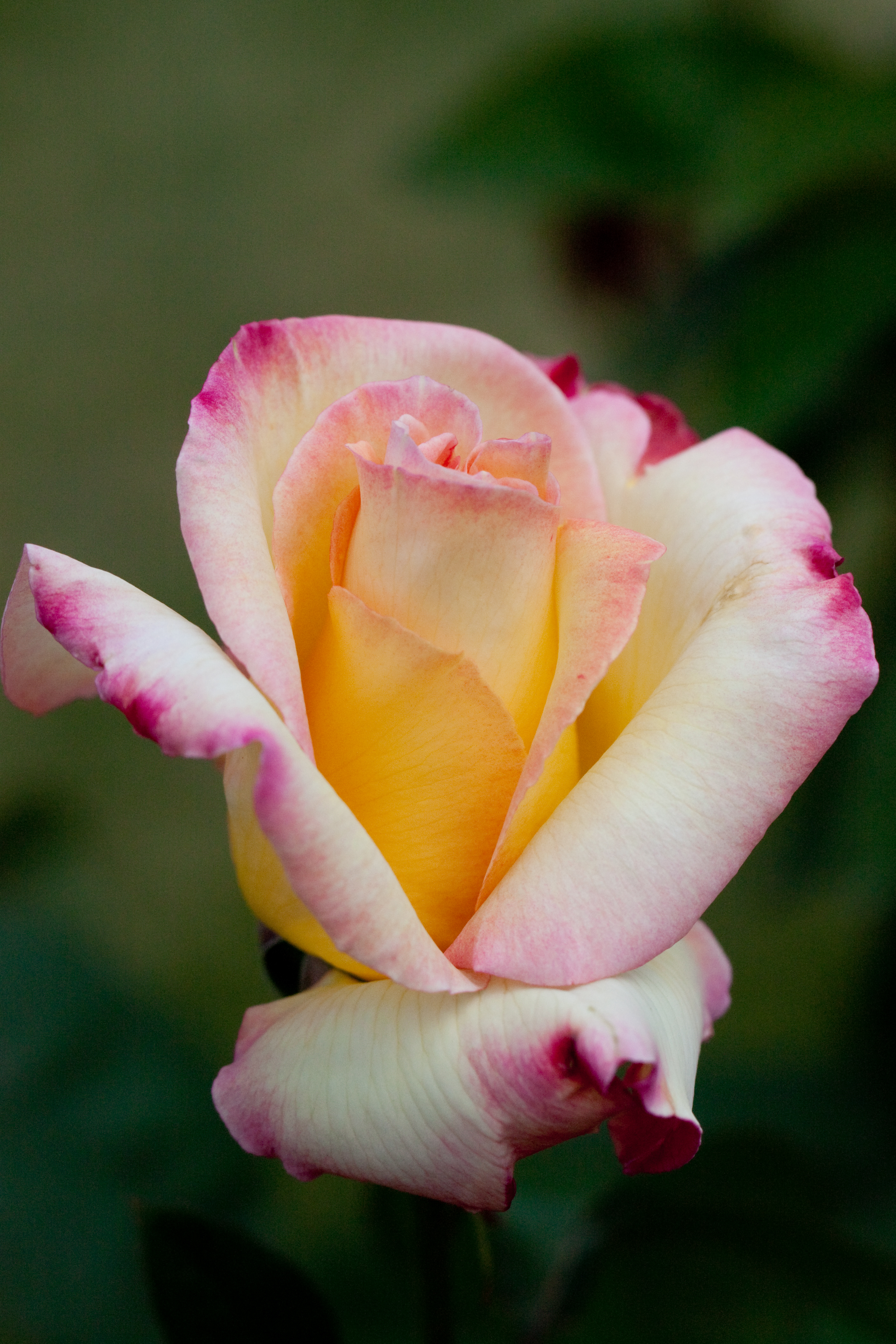
A 'Garden Party' bud opening

The high-centered, double-shaped flowers have 25–28 petals and a creamy-white colour with more or less pink-edged outer petals. The Ultimate Rose Book says that 'Garden Party' has "the 'Peace' colors but more delicate". The flowers develop from urn-shaped buds, reach an average diameter of 11 cm (4.5") and have a light lemony fragrance. 'Garden Party' blooms repeatedly throughout the season. Thanks to its large well-shaped flowers, it is a popular exhibition variety.

The vigorous shrub reaches 90 to 200 cm (2 ft 11 in to 6 ft 7 in) height and 60 to 75 cm (24 to 30 in) width and is winter hardy down to −15 °C (5 °F) (USDA zone 7b) and can be susceptible to mildew. The young shoots are red, the semi-glossy foliage bluish.

'Garden Party' won a gold medal at the Bagatelle Rose Trials in 1959 and was included into the All-American-Rose-Selection in 1960. It is a parent to cultivars such as 'Double Delight' (Swim & Ellis 1997), 'Gold Medal' (Christensen, 1982) and 'Kokyu' (Kono, 1978).
