= Rosa 'Charlotte Armstrong' =

Pink hybrid tea rose cultivar

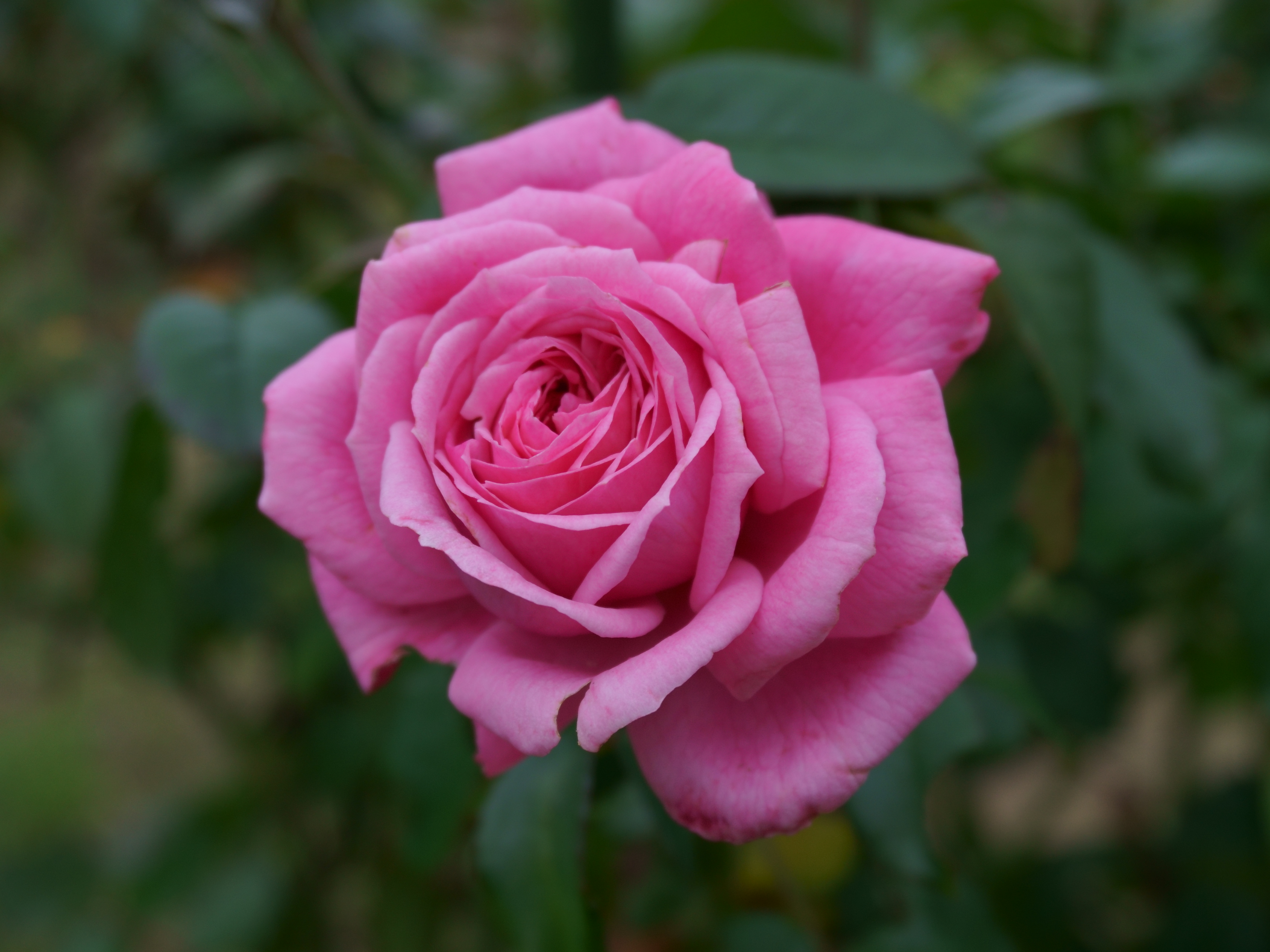
- Rosa 'Charlotte Armstrong'
- Genus: Rosa hybrid
- Hybrid parentage: 'Soeur Therese' x 'Crimson Glory'
- Cultivar group: Hybrid tea
- Breeder: Lammerts
- Origin: United States, 1940

Rosa 'Charlotte Armstrong' is a pink Hybrid tea rose cultivar developed by Dr. Walter Lammerts and introduced in the U.S. by Armstrong Roses in 1940. The rose won the All-America Rose Selections Award (AARS) and the Portland Gold Medal in 1941.

== Description ==
'Charlotte Armstrong' is a vigorous, upright hybrid tea rose, 4.9 ft (1.5 m) in height with a 3.3 ft (1.0 m) spread. Blooms are large, with an average diameter of 5.9 in (150 mm), and a full bloom form (26–40 petals). Long, pointed red buds open to medium-pink flowers with darker pink backs. The flowers have long, durable petals and a strong, sweet, citrus fragrance. Flowers are primarily carried singly on long stems. 'Charlotte Armstrong' blooms in flushes throughout the growing season. It is very disease resistant. The shrub has a lax, ungainly growth habit and dark green, leathery foliage.

== History ==
=== Walter Lammerts ===
Walter E. Lammerts (1904-1996) was an author, horticulturist, and rose breeder. He earned a BS and PhD in horticulture from the University of California, Berkeley. In 1935, he was hired by John Armstrong, owner of Armstrong Nurseries, and established the company's rose development program. He introduced 46 new rose varieties between 1940 and 1981. Working with Los Angeles newspaper owner, Manchester Boddy, Lammerts developed a plant research program at Descanso Gardens in La Cañada Flintridge, California. He later continued his plant research in Livermore, California working at the Amling-DeVor Nursery. Lammerts died on June 4, 1996.

=== 'Charlotte Armstrong' ===
Lammerts developed the rose cultivar by crossing the yellow Hybrid tea, 'Soeur Therese' with red Hybrid tea rose, 'Crimson Glory'. Armstrong Roses introduced 'Charlotte Armstrong' into the U.S. in 1940, and named the new rose for John Armstrong's wife, Charlotte. 'Charlotte Armstrong' was used to hybridize twenty child plants, including 'Queen Elizabeth', 'Garden Party', 'Tiffany', and 'Chrysler Imperial'. The rose is the official flower of the city of Ontario, California, where Armstrong Roses was based. 'Charlotte Armstrong' won the All-America Rose Selections Award (AARS) and the Portland Gold Medal in 1941.
