= Rosa 'Double Delight' =

Red and white hybrid tea rose

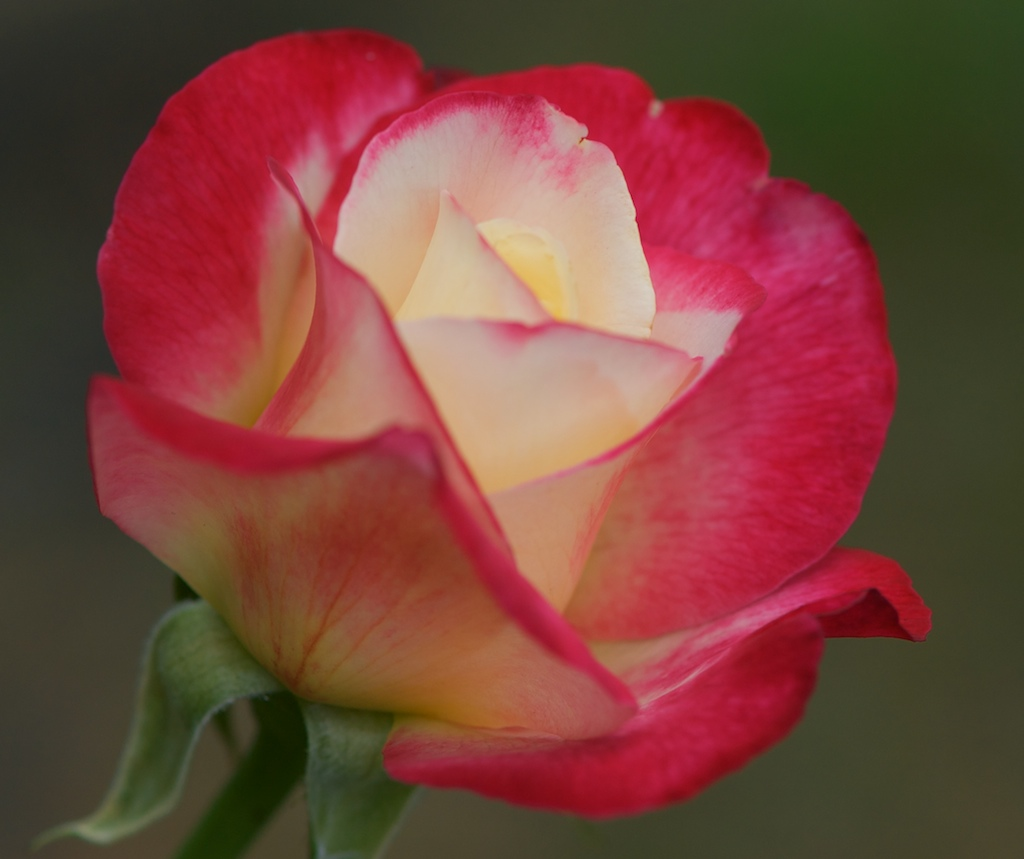
- Hybrid parentage: Rosa 'Granada' × Rosa 'Garden Party'
- Cultivar group: Hybrid Tea
- Cultivar: ANDeli
- Marketing names: 'Double Delight', 'ANDeli'
- Breeder: Swim & Ellis
- Origin: United States, 1976

Rosa 'Double Delight', (aka ANDeli), is a red blend hybrid tea rose cultivar bred in the United States by Swim & Ellis and introduced in 1977. Its parents were two hybrid tea cultivars, the red and yellow 'Granada' (Lindquist, 1963) and the ivory 'Garden Party' (Swim, 1959).

== Description ==
The large, strongly fragrant red and white flowers have a high-centered bloom form and appear continuously throughout the season. They are double, have a diameter of more than 10 cm (4") and up to 30 petals. In the sun, their colour changes from white to carmine red, beginning at the edges. The flowers are very large and usually borne singly, on long, prickly stems. The flowers have a strong, sweet scent. The red color of 'Double Delight' is the product of ultraviolet light on natural pigments in the petals. If the plant is grown in a greenhouse, which blocks ultraviolet light, the petals will be white in color.

'Double Delight' is a medium-tall bushy shrub with large, dark green leaves. It grows about 90 to 150 cm (3' to 5') high, and 60 centimetres (2.0 ft) wide. It is winter hardy up to −25 °C (USDA zone 5), but can be susceptible to mildew and black spot. The cultivar needs sunny, warm places, but can be grown in containers. 'Double Delight' is used as garden rose and as cut flower.

== Sports ==
One sport of 'Double Delight' was introduced in 1982. The climbing sport, Rosa 'Double Delight, Cl', also known as 'AROclidd' and 'Grimpant Double Delight', was discovered by John Nieuwesteeg and Jack E. Christensen. The cultivar is a popular rose and similar to 'Double Delight', except that it climbs quickly to great heights. The plant, when mature, will bloom in abundance once a year, and will continue to flower, but in smaller numbers.

"'Double Delight' is one of the best known and most widely grown modern roses throughout the world. No one knows whether its name refers to the two contrasting colors in its blooms, or whether the 'double delight' is its color and its scent."

— Quest-Ritson, 2011.

== Awards ==
'Double Delight' was granted several awards, such as gold medals in Baden-Baden and Rome in 1976, fragrance awards in Geneva (1976), and the inclusion in the All-America Rose Selections in 1977. In 1985, the cultivar was inducted into the Rose Hall of Fame.
