= Rosa 'Chrysler Imperial' =

Rose cultivar

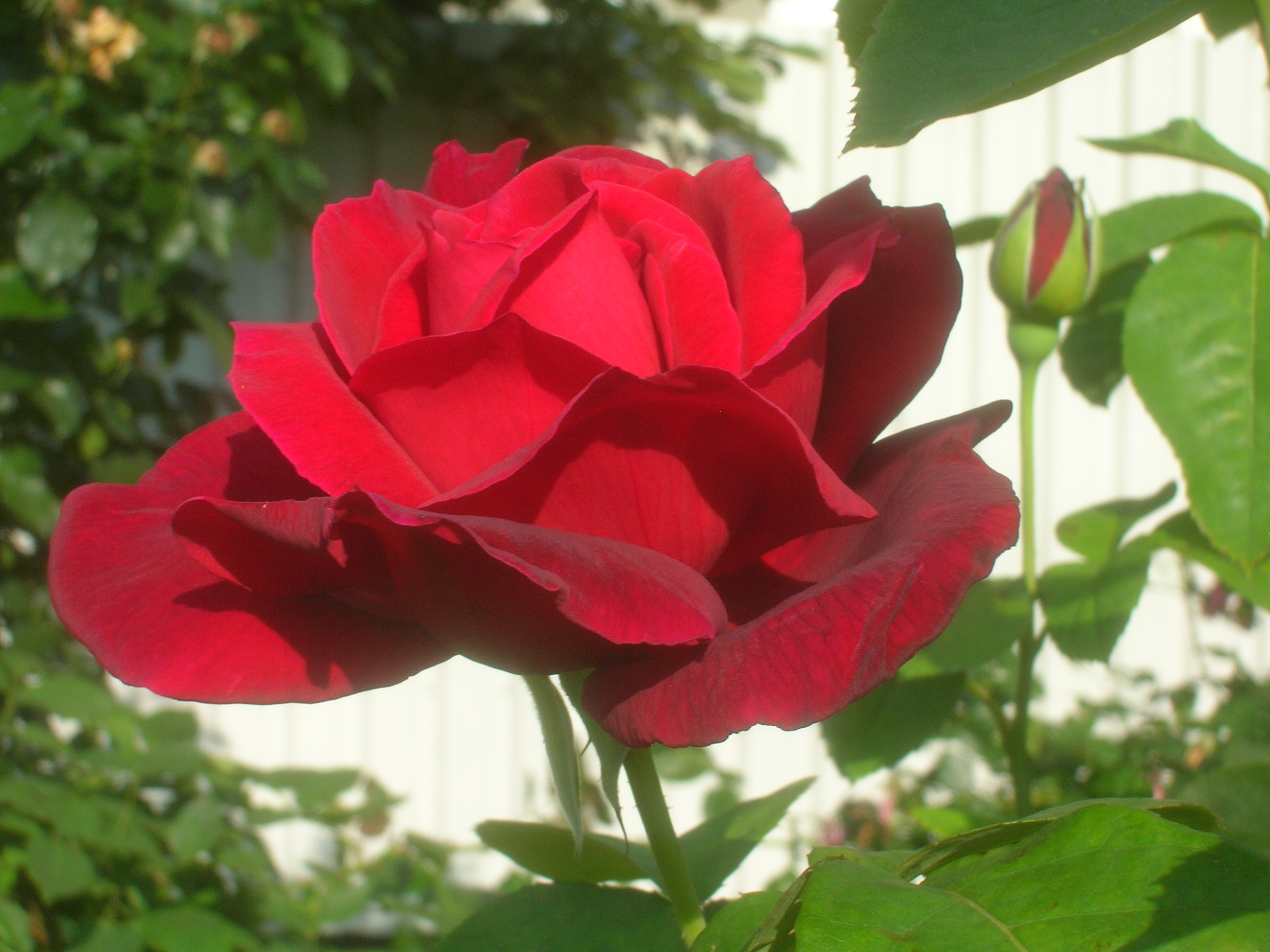
- Hybrid parentage: 'Charlotte Armstrong' x 'Mirandy'
- Cultivar group: Hybrid tea
- Cultivar: 'Chrysler Imperial'
- Origin: Lammerts 1952

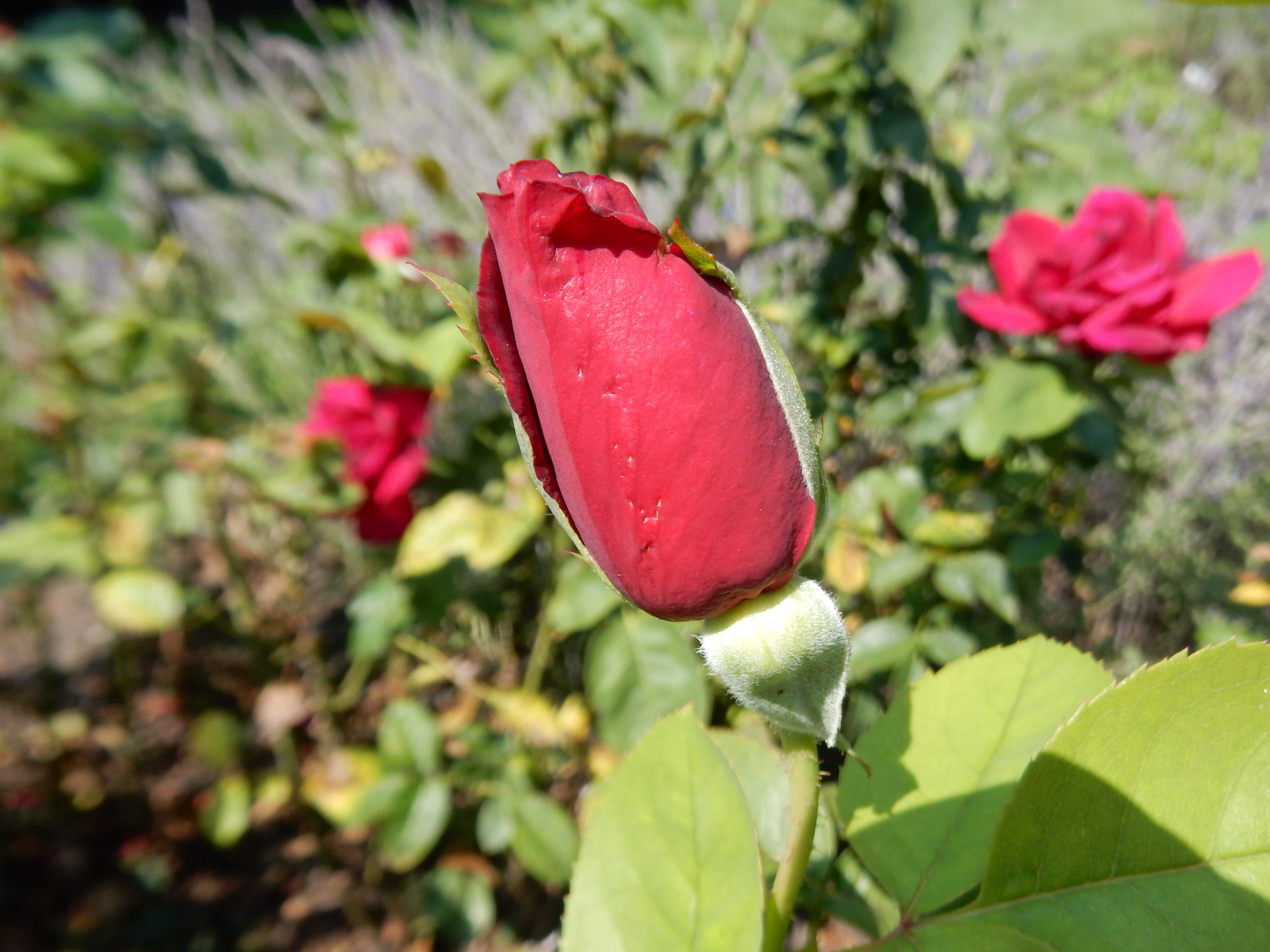
Bud of 'Chrysler Imperial'

Rosa 'Chrysler Imperial' is a strongly fragrant, dark red hybrid tea rose cultivar. This variety was bred and publicly debuted by Dr. Walter E. Lammerts of Descanso Gardens, La Cañada Flintridge, California, US in 1952. Its stock parents 'Charlotte Armstrong' (cerise pink) and 'Mirandy' (dark oxblood red) are both 'All American Rose Selections'-roses (awarded in 1940 and 1945).

The elegantly tapered buds open into high-centered blossoms with a diameter of about 11–13 cm (4.5–5 in) and can have up to 45–50 petals (which is a high number for a hybrid tea rose) with a rich, deep, velvety red color. The cultivar flushes in a chronological blooming pattern throughout its local season, starting in late spring until fall. The long-stemmed rose flowers are long lasting and showy and make excellent cut flowers, though they "blue" badly with age.

The rose bush reaches 75 to 200 cm (30 to 79 in) height, and a diameter of 60 to 120 cm (24 to 47 in). The shrub has an upright form with very thorny canes and semi-glossy dark green foliage. It is not a very cold hardy rose (USDA zone 6b through 9b) and needs good sun exposure. Without good air circulation it is susceptible to mildew and blackspot, particularly in cool climates.

A distinguished descendant is Rosa 'Papa Meilland'.

Cultivar (PP01528), United States Patent No: PP 1,167.

== Honors ==
- 1951 Portland Gold Medal
- 1953 All-America Rose Selections

1953 only two roses including Chrysler Imperial were awarded the All American Rose Selections. At the award presentation ceremony at Rockefeller Plaza, New York City, New York, US, the award to the Chrysler Imperial rose was presented by Miss Nancy True Thorne, Queen of the Tournament of Roses.

- 1964 John Cook Medal
- 1965 James Alexander Gamble Rose Fragrance Award

== Official association with Chrysler Corporation (producers of the Chrysler Imperial automobile) ==
In the 1954 Pasadena Tournament of Roses Parade, 25,000 Chrysler Imperial roses in individual refreshment tubes of water covered the base of the float entered by the City of Detroit, Michigan, US and Chrysler Corporation. The theme of the float was Life of an American Workman, as Chrysler Corporation founder Walter P. Chrysler had titled his autobiography. The center of this float featured the figure of an American Workman striding out from the pages of a book to strike a heavy hammer upon an anvil from which floral "sparks" flowed, their trains leading in several directions to various Detroit signature products: an automobile, a truck, an airplane, a tank, and a boat.

== Literature and references ==
- RHS Encyclopedia of Roses, Charles and Brigid Quest-Ritson, 2008, Penguin (German translation: Rosen, die große Enzyklopedie, Dorling Kinsley Verlag 2010, ISBN 978-3-8310-1734-8)
