= Ford Torino =

Ford mid-size car produced 1968–1976

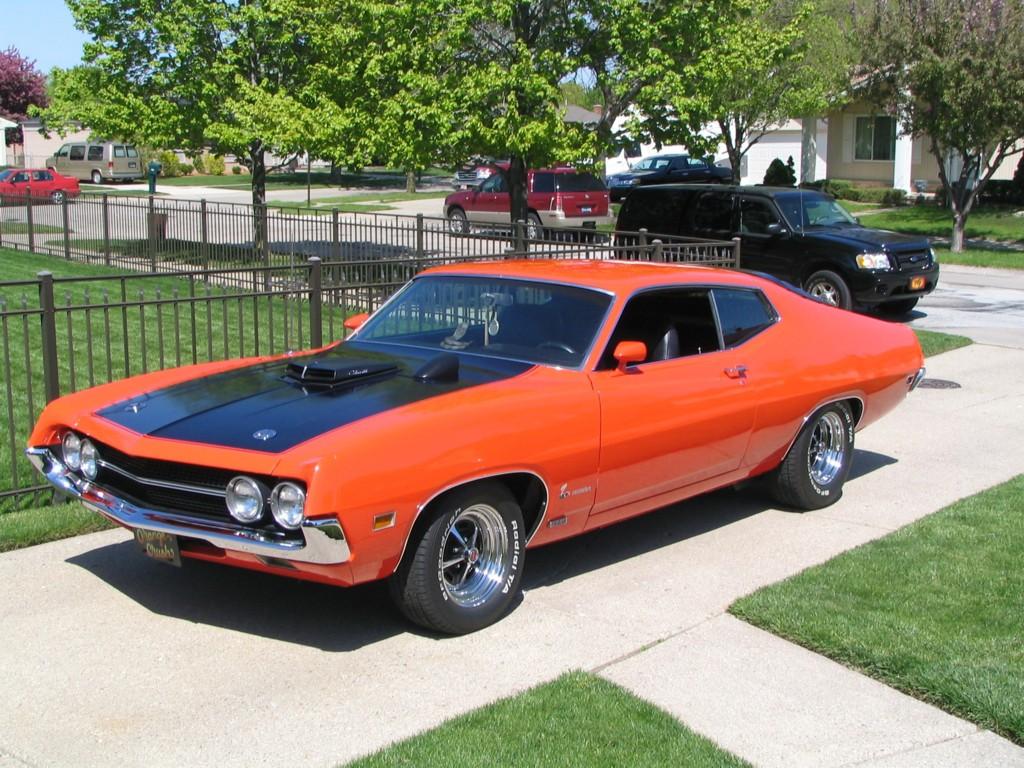
- 1970 Ford Torino Cobra SportsRoof

Overview
- Manufacturer: Ford
- Also called: Ford Fairlane (Venezuela)
- Production: 1968–1976
- Assembly: Atlanta, Georgia, United States (⧉); Milpitas, California, United States (⧉); Lorain, Ohio, United States (⧉); Chicago, Illinois, United States (⧉); Kansas City, Missouri, United States (⧉); Oakville, Ontario, Canada (⧉)

Body and chassis
- Class: Mid-size car, muscle car
- Layout: FR layout
- Related: Mercury Montego

Chronology
- Predecessor: Ford Fairlane (1962-1970)
- Successor: Ford LTD II

The Ford Torino is an automobile that was produced by Ford for the North American market between 1968 and 1976. It was a competitor in the intermediate market segment and essentially a twin to the Mercury Montego line.

Just as the Ford LTD had been the upscale version of the Ford Galaxie, the Torino was initially an upscale variation of the intermediate-sized Ford Fairlane. In the 1968 and 1969 model years, the intermediate Ford line consisted of lower-trim Fairlanes and its subseries, the upper-trim Torino models. In 1970, Torino became the primary name for Ford's intermediate, and the Fairlane was now a subseries of the Torino. In 1971, the Fairlane name was dropped altogether, and all Ford intermediates were called Torino.

Most Torinos were conventional cars, and generally the most popular models were the four-door sedans and two-door hardtops. However, Ford produced some high-performance "muscle car" versions of the Torino by fitting them with large powerful engines, such as the 428 cu in (7.0 L) and 429 cu in (7.0 L) "Cobra-Jet" engines. Ford also chose the Torino as the base for its NASCAR entrants, and it has a successful racing heritage.

== First generation (1968–1969) ==
=== 1968 ===
1968 Ford Fairlane/Torino
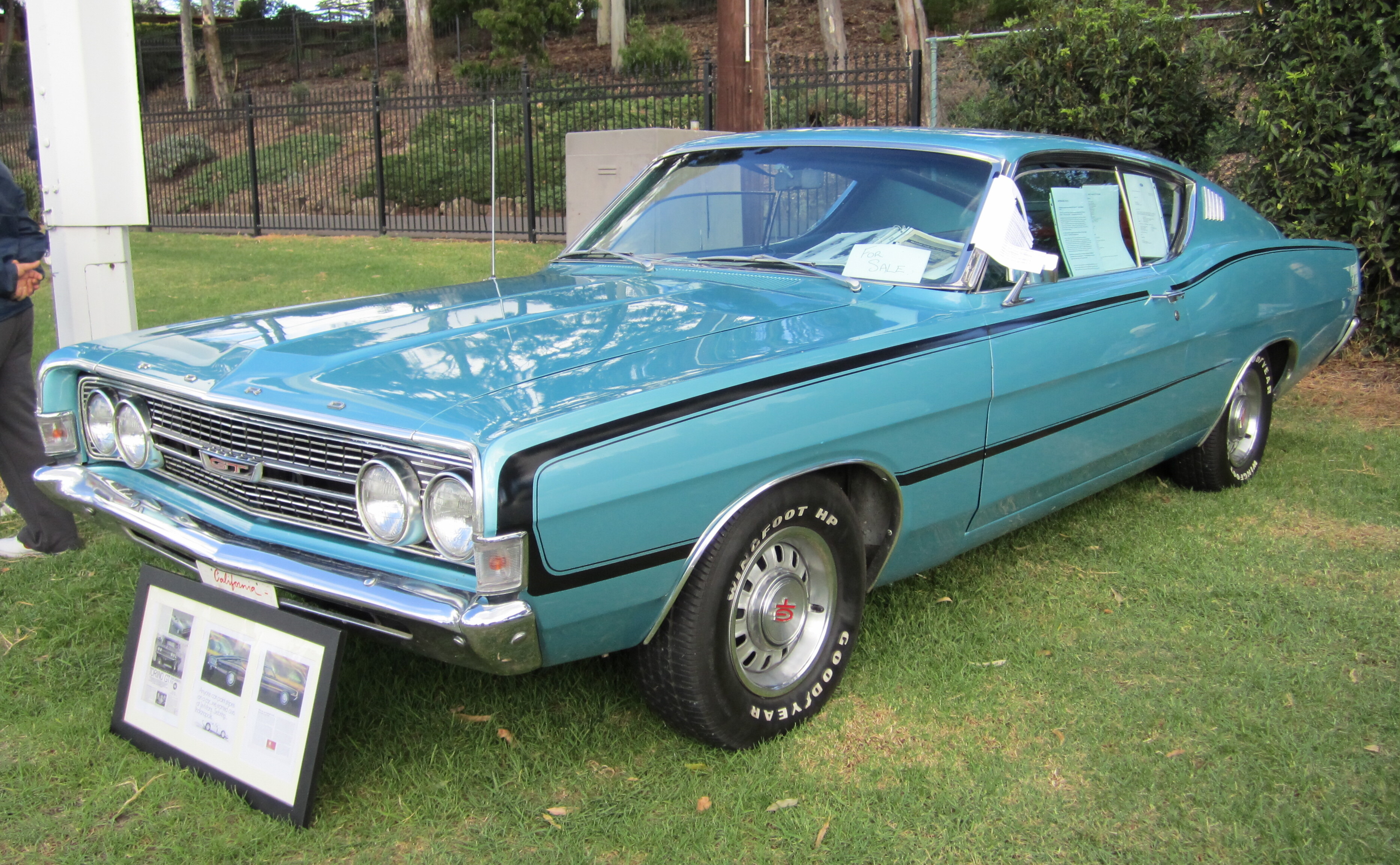
- 1968 Ford Torino GT SportsRoof

Body and chassis
- Body style: 2-door hardtop 2-door fastback 2-door convertible 4-door sedan 4-door station wagon
- Chassis: unibody
- Related: Ford Fairlane; Ford Ranchero; Mercury Comet; Mercury Cyclone; Mercury Montego

Powertrain
- Engine: 200 cu in (3.3 L) I6; 289 cu in (4.7 L) Windsor V8; 302 cu in (4.9 L) Windsor V8; 390 cu in (6.4 L) FE V8; 427 cu in (7.0 L) FE V8; 428 cu in (7.0 L) FE V8
- Transmission: 3-speed manual 4-speed manual 3-speed C4 automatic 3-speed C6 automatic

Dimensions
- Wheelbase: 116.0 in (2,946 mm); 113.0 in (2,870 mm) (wagon)
- Length: 201.0 in (5,105 mm); 203.9 in (5,179 mm) (wagon)
- Width: 74.6 in (1,895 mm)
- Height: 55 in (1,397 mm)
- Curb weight: 2,932–3,514 lb (1,330–1,594 kg)*; *Shipping weight

For 1968, Ford redesigned its intermediate Fairlane line and introduced a new premium subseries model, the Torino, named after the city of Turin (Torino, in Italian), considered "the Italian Detroit". The name had been one of several originally proposed for the Mustang while in development. The 1968 Fairlane and Torino used the same wheelbases as its 1967 predecessor: 116 in (2,946 mm) on 2- and 4-door models, and 113 in (2,870 mm) for station wagon models.

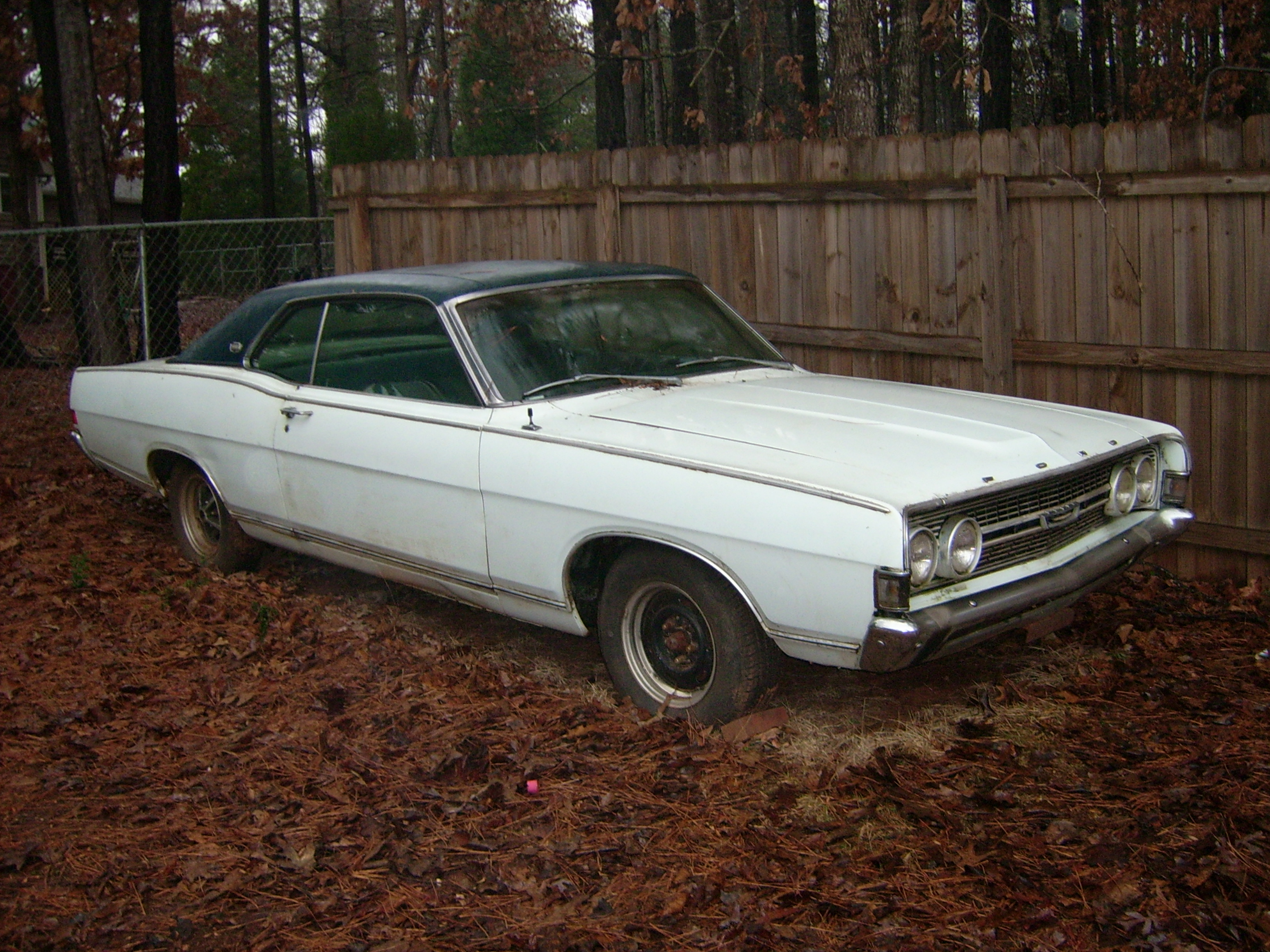
1968 Ford Torino 2-Door Hardtop (unrestored)

Styling was drastically changed from the 1967 Fairlane models, boosting size and weight. The front fascia had a full-width recessed grille, with horizontal quad headlights placed at the outer edges. Some models had horizontal dividing bars in the grille. To meet new regulations introduced in 1968, parking lights were placed at the outer edge of the front fenders and wrapped around the corner to also act as side marker lights. The body sides were smooth with one horizontal body crease running just below the beltline from front to back. The rectangular taillights were vertically situated in the rear panel above the rear bumper. Reverse lights sat in the middle of the taillights, and reflectors were on the rear edge of the quarter panel.

A new addition for 1968 was the two-door hardtop fastback "SportsRoof" bodystyle. Similar to Mustang fastback models, it featured a gently sloped roof line that extended to the edge of the trunk lid and a unique concave taillamp panel. This new fastback body style gave the Fairlane and the Torino excellent aerodynamics that would later prove to be advantageous on the race track.

Ford had 14 models in its intermediate line for 1968. The base model was the "Fairlane", which was available in a 2-door hardtop, a 4-door sedan, and a 4-door station wagon. Next was the mid level "Fairlane 500", which was available as a 2-door hardtop, 2-door SportsRoof, convertible, and a 4-door sedan and station wagon. This was followed by the top level "Torino" series, which consisted of a 2-door formal(notchback) hardtop, a 4-door sedan, and the Squire station wagon that featured wood grained applique. Finally, the "Torino GT", the sporty version of the Fairlane 500 series, included the formal hardtop, the SportsRoof hardtop, and a convertible.

The 1968 Fairlane/Torino was constructed with unibody chassis using the same platform as the 1966–67 models. The front suspension consisted of short/long control arms with coil springs mounted on an upper control arm and a strut stabilized lower control arm. Rear suspension consisted of long semi-elliptical leaf springs on a solid axle. A heavy-duty suspension option was available for V8 powered cars, and included extra-heavy-duty springs and shocks. Steering was recirculating ball system, with power steering optional. All cars came standard with four-wheel drum brakes, although front disc brakes and power assist were options.

The interior on the Fairlane/Torino was all new for 1968. A new dashboard featured four equally sized round pods centred around the steering wheel. However, the pods did not contain a full set of gauges; rather an assortment of warning lights along with the speedometer and fuel gauge. The fuel gauge and temperature warning lights were in the first pod, a 120 mph (190 km/h) speedometer was located in the second pod from the left, alternator and oil pressure warning lights were in the third pod from the left and the fourth pod was blank. An optional tachometer was available, which would be located in the third pod, and an optional clock occupied the fourth pod. Ford offered many upholstery options, including a knitted vinyl option, called "comfortweave." This unique option allowed the vinyl to "breathe" unlike conventional vinyl, offering more comfort in hot weather. Conforming to U.S. safety standards, there was much padding inside the Torino's interior, which also featured shoulder belts for front outboard passengers on all cars built after December 31, 1967.

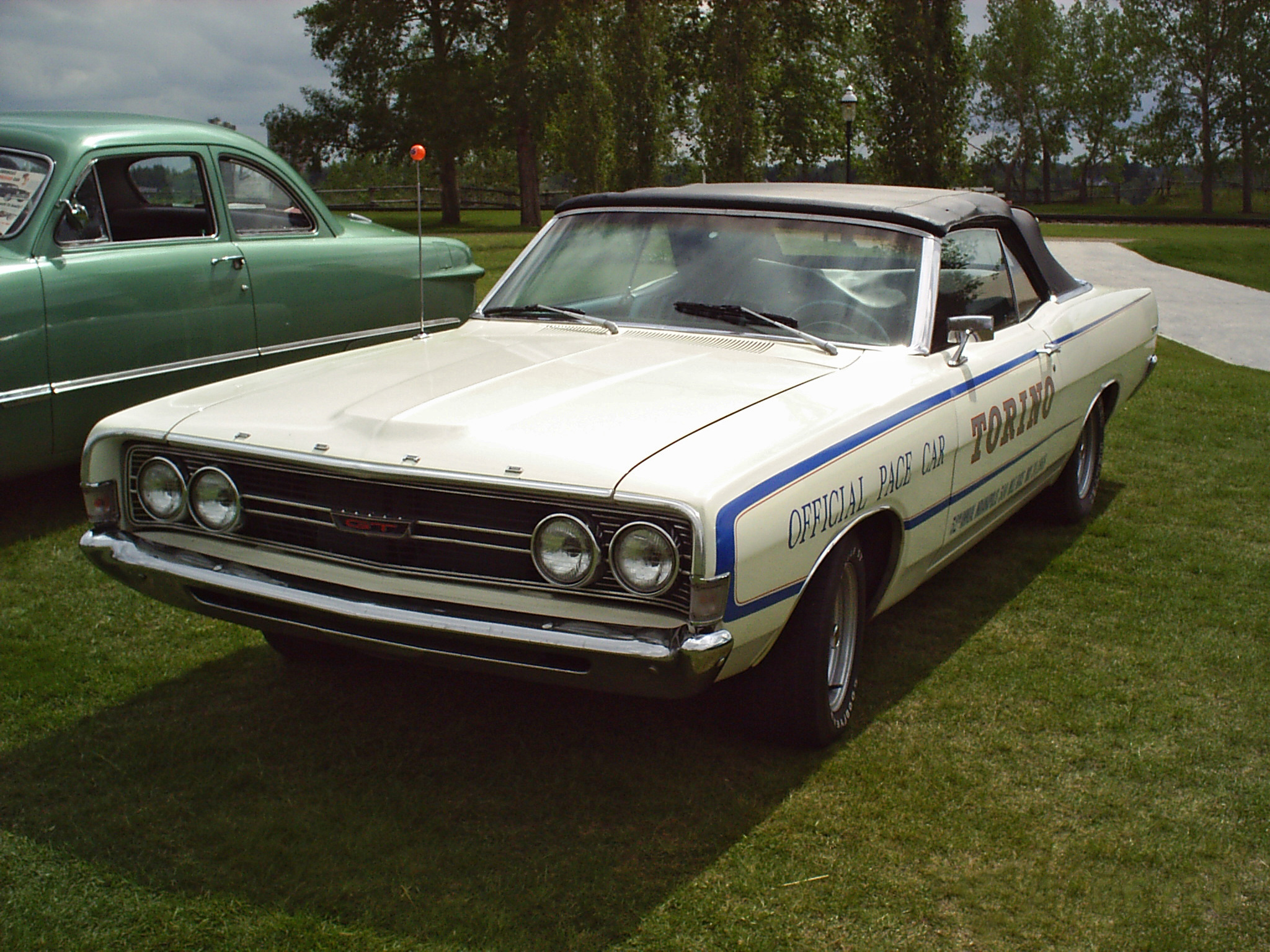
1968 Ford Torino Pace Car Convertible

All Torinos included full color-keyed carpeting, additional exterior and interior trim over a Fairlane, and Torino crests on the 'C' pillar. The Torino GT's standard features included special name plaques and exterior trim, GT markings on wheel covers and courtesy lights on the inside door panels. Initial sales literature showed that bucket seats were standard equipment. However, due to a six-week UAW strike, the GT's standard seating was changed to a bench seat. The Torino GT was available with a GT handling suspension package, which included extra-heavy-duty springs and shocks, and a heavy-duty front anti-sway bar. Of note, when the 428 CJ engine was installed, the suspensions used the stiffest springs and largest front sway bar compared to other Torinos with the heavy-duty suspension. Four-speed equipped cars used staggered rear shocks which helped resist axle hop. GTs were available with a stripe option, which started as a 'C' shape at the edge of the front fender, and two body stripes extended the length of the car.

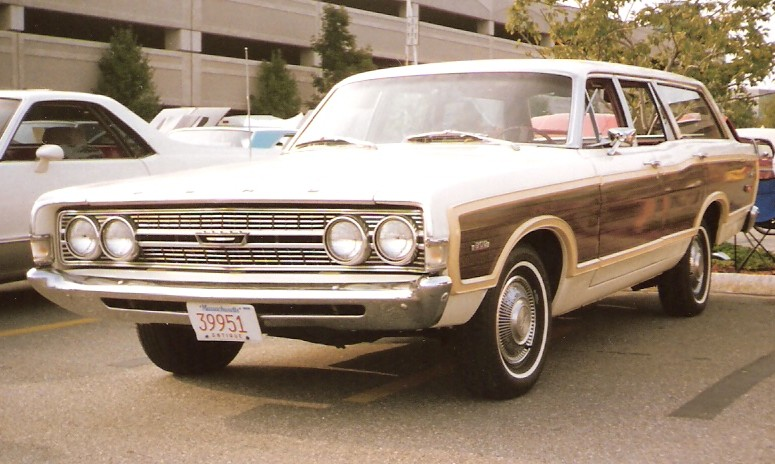
1968 Ford Torino Squire Wagon

Ford had quite a variety of engine options for its intermediate line. All models other than the Torino GT came standard with a 200 cu in (3.3 L) six-cylinder engine. Torino GT models came standard with a 302 cu in (4.9 L)-2V small block V8 and this was also the base V8 engine optional on other models. Other available engines included a 390 cu in (6.4 L)-2V FE engine, 390 cu in (6.4 L)-4V FE engine and a 427 cu in (7.0 L)-4V FE engine. About one month within the beginning of the 1968 model year production, a six-week UAW strike against Ford occurred. This resulted in a cost-cutting measure of making a 289 cu in (4.7 L)-2V small block V8 the base V8 engine and the standard engine on the Torino GT. Ford did not change any of its factory sales literature to reflect this change. While the 427 cu in (7.0 L)-4V FE engine was initially listed as an engine option for 1968 in factory literature, no Fairlanes or Torinos were actually produced with this engine during 1968. Introduced on April 1, 1968, the 428 cu in (7.0 L)-4V CJ (Cobra-Jet) FE engine became available as an engine option, but due to its mid-year introduction these engines are very rare. The 428-4V Cobra-Jet was the most potent engine available for 1968, and is general believed to be under-rated at 335 hp (250 kW). The cars equipped with the 428 Cobra Jets had emblems borrowed from the full-sized Fords (a red-and-chrome badge reading "428") mounted on the fenders behind the parking lamps. All models came standard with a three-speed manual transmission. Two Cruise-O-Matic automatics and a four-speed manual were optional. The C4 automatic was installed on smaller displacement engines up to the 302 V8, and C6 automatic was installed on all other larger displacement engines.

According to contemporary reviews, when equipped properly the Torino GT offered a good combination of power and handling. In Car Life magazine's test of a 1968 Torino GT SportsRoof equipped with a 390-4V, C-6, and 3.25:1 axle, they recorded a 0 – 60 mph (97 km/h) time of 7.7 seconds, and the quarter-mile (402 m) dragstrip time of 15.8 seconds at 90 mph (140 km/h). Motor Trend magazine wrote "Putting the car through quick and/or tight corners isn't a matter of practiced art – it's more like second nature for the GT" in their test of a 1968 Torino GT. Car and Driver magazine tested a 1968 Ford Torino GT equipped with the 428 CJ with Ram Air induction, C-6 Cruise-O-Matic, and 3.91:1 gears and recorded a quarter-mile time of 14.2 seconds at 98.9 mph (159.2 km/h). Car and Driver wrote the Torino had "a 1–2 shift that broke the Wide-Ovals loose for at least a length. With a price tag of $306 for the Cobra-Jet option, Ford lovers have a reason to rejoice."

Station wagons came in three different models: "Fairlane", "Fairlane 500", and "Torino Squire." All wagons came equipped with Ford's "Magic Doorgate" two-way tailgate, and were available with an optional rear-facing third seat which increased the car's carrying capacity from 6 to 8 people. Torino Squire models came standard with simulated woodgrain side panels, and had the more refined trim and upholstery of the Torino sedans. Unique station wagon options included a chrome roof rack and a power rear window.

1968 was a successful year for Torino with 172,083 units produced. Including Fairlane production, 371,787 cars were produced. The Torino was well received by the automotive press and a 1968 Torino GT convertible was selected as the 1968 Indianapolis 500 pace car.

=== 1969 ===
1969 Ford Fairlane/Torino
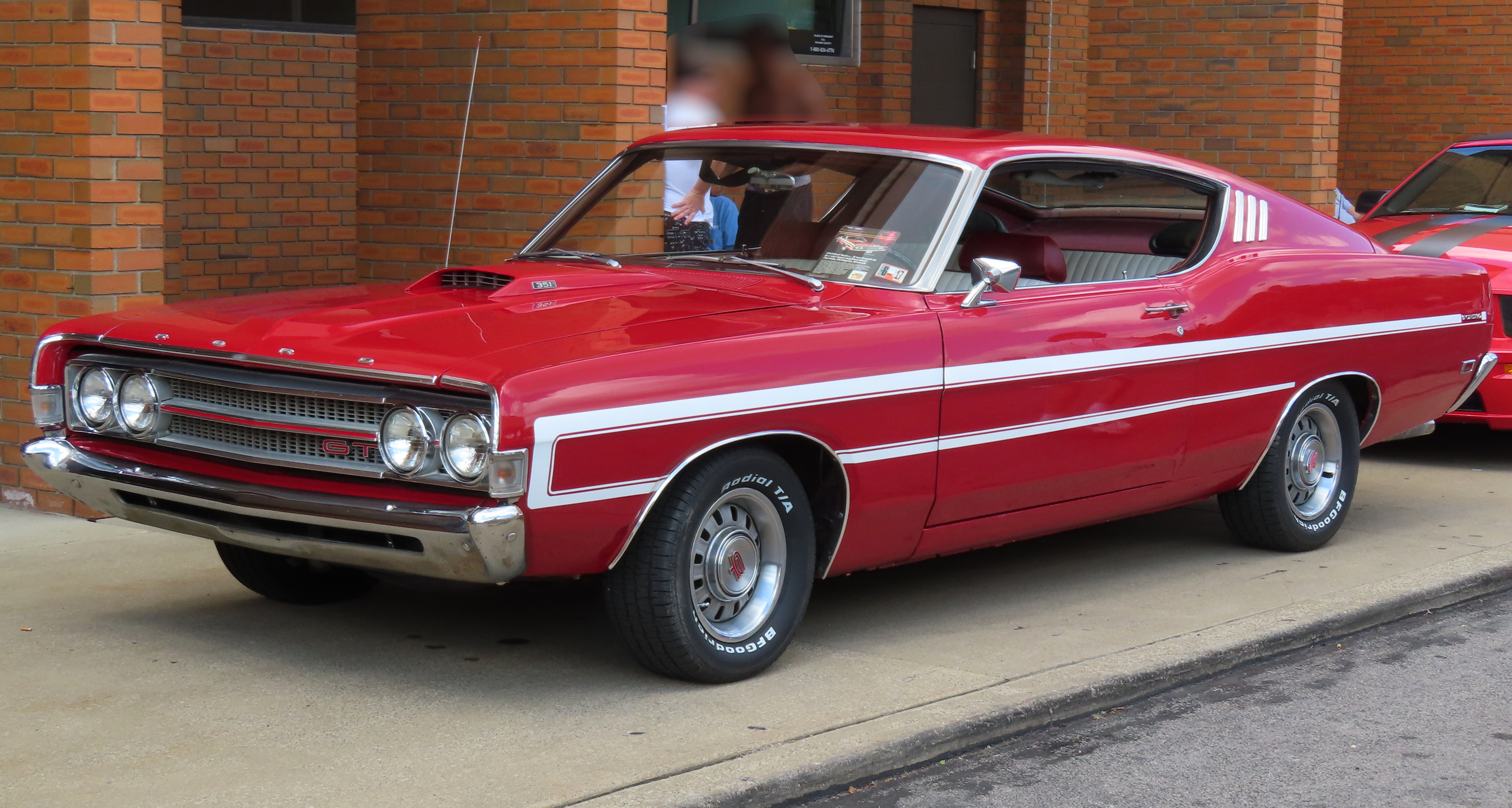
- 1969 Ford Torino GT SportsRoof

Body and chassis
- Body style: 2-door hardtop 2-door fastback 2-door convertible 4-door sedan 4-door station wagon
- Chassis: unibody
- Related: Ford Torino Talladega; Ford Ranchero; Mercury Comet; Mercury Cyclone; Mercury Montego

Powertrain
- Engine: 250 cu in (4.1 L) I6; 302 cu in (4.9 L) Windsor V8; 351 cu in (5.8 L) Windsor V8; 390 cu in (6.4 L) FE V8; 427 cu in (7.0 L) FE V8 428 cu in (7.0 L) FE V8 429 cu in (7.0 L) FE V8
- Transmission: 3-speed manual 4-speed manual 3-speed C4 automatic 3-speed C6 automatic

Dimensions
- Wheelbase: 116.0 in (2,946 mm); 113.0 in (2,870 mm) (wagon)
- Length: 201.0 in (5,105 mm); 203.9 in (5,179 mm) (wagon); 206 in (5,232 mm) (Talladega)
- Width: 74.6 in (1,895 mm)
- Curb weight: 3,010–3,556 lb (1,365–1,613 kg)*; *Shipping weight

The 1969 Fairlane/Torino saw some cosmetic changes, and there were quite a few performance oriented changes. Ford performed the typical minor styling adjustments, but overall the 1969 models were similar in appearance to the 1968 models. The grille was revised slightly, and now had a more prominent centre dividing bar, while the taillights were restyled on non-fastback models to be similar to the 1969 Ford full-size cars. Fastbacks retained the 1968-style taillights and rear panel. All models above the Fairlane, had an aluminium dividing bar that ran across the rear panel, between the taillights and inline with the reverse lights on SportsRoof models.

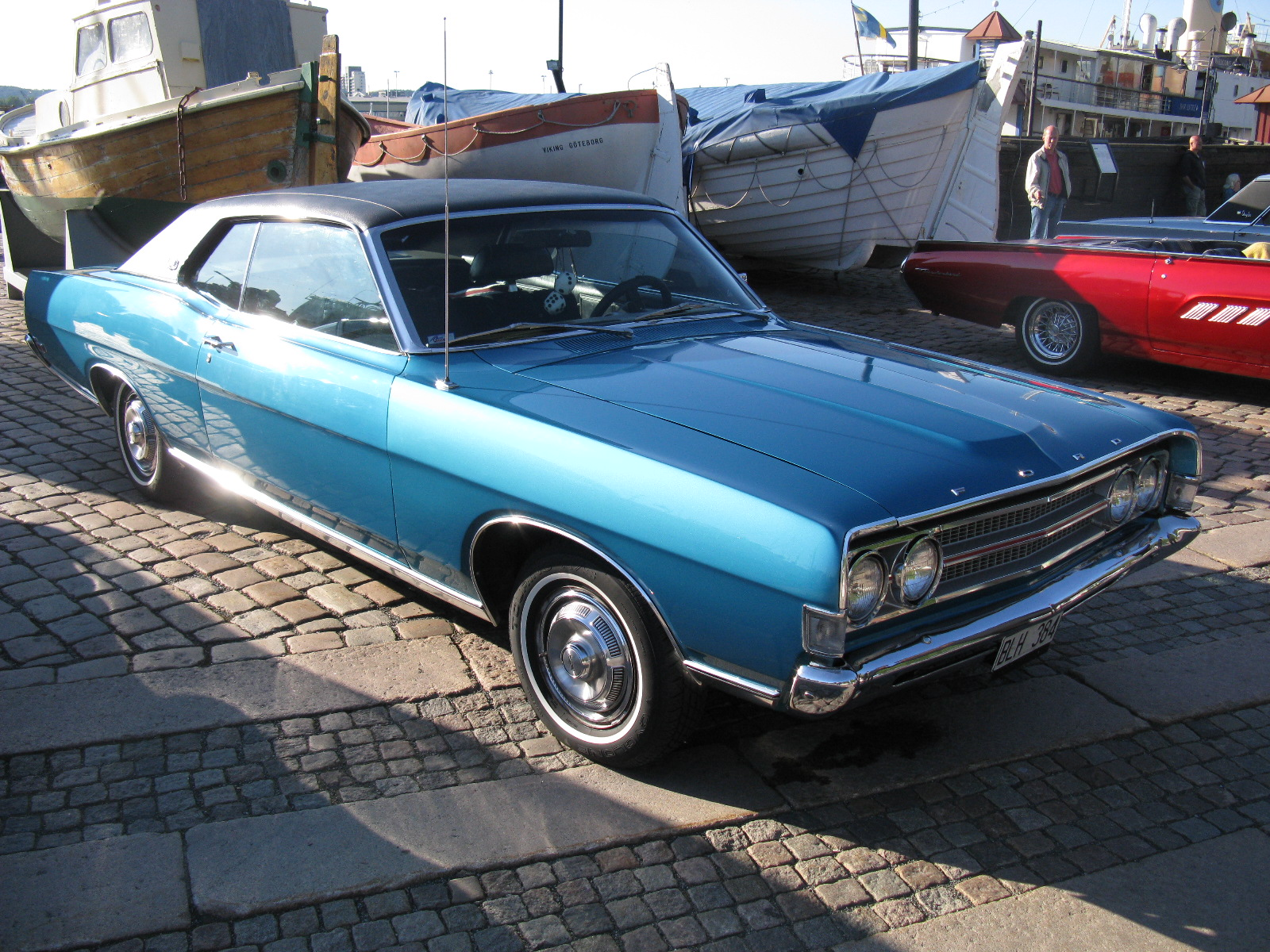
1969 Ford Torino 2-door Hardtop

The number of models produced by Ford increased for 1969, from 14 to 16. All carryover models were the same as 1968, with the two new models being the "Cobra" 2-door SportsRoof and 2-door hardtop. Some automotive literature list these models as "Torino Cobra", with the Cobra being a sub-series to the Torino. The Cobra has the same body code as a Fairlane 500, so some sources refer to these cars as the "Fairlane Cobra". Most of Ford's literature at the time only used the name "Cobra" without Torino or Fairlane attached. The car itself did not have any Fairlane or Torino nameplates on its exterior or interior, although 1969 NASCAR entrants were labeled "Torino Cobras." For the purpose of this article, only "Cobra" will be used, as Ford marketed the car as such in 1969 without Fairlane or Torino attached.

The engine line-up was slightly revised for 1969. All models, except Torino GTs and Cobras, came standard with a new larger 250 cu in (4.1 L) I-6 engine. The larger displacement produced more power and torque than the 200 cu in (3.3 L) engine. Optional engines included the 302 cu in (4.9 L)-2V (standard on GTs), the new for 1969 351 cu in (5.8 L)-2V Windsor, 351-4V Windsor, 390 cu in (6.4 L)-4V, and the 428 cu in (7.0 L)-4V Cobra Jet (standard on Cobras). The 428 CJ was available with or without the Ram Air Induction package, however, those with Ram Air still carried the same advertised power rating. The 428 CJ without Ram Air, came with an 80-ampere heavy-duty battery, 3.25:1 open differential, heavy-duty cooling package, 55-ampere alternator, chrome valve covers and dual exhaust. The Ram Air 428 CJ included all of the above, but had a 3.50:1 open differential, and the functional hood scoop. With Ram Air, "428 Cobra Jet" emblems were placed on each side of the hood scoop; without Ram Air, "428" emblems were placed on the front fender. The 428 Cobra Jet had a 735 cfm Holley four-barrel carburetor. Transmission options remain unchanged; however, the FMX was added to the Torino line-up and was sometimes used instead of the C-4 and C-6.

The 428 CJ was no longer the top engine choice; superseded by the 428-4V Super Cobra Jet (SCJ). This engine was specifically designed for drag racing, and it was included with the "Drag Pack" option package. The Drag Pack option package could be ordered with the Q-code 428-4V or the R-code 'Ram Air' equipped 428-4V, and would transform either engine into a Super Cobra Jet. Included with 428 SCJ were cast pistons, a nodular controlled cast-iron crankshaft casting 1UA or 1UA B with an external weight on the snout behind the balancer, 427 (LeMans) capscrew connecting rods, an engine oil cooler, and either a 9 in (230 mm) rear axle with 3.91:1 gears and a Traction-Lock limited slip or 4.30:1 gears with a Detroit Locker. The Detroit Locker and the oil cooler were industry exclusives to Ford. This package did not change Ford's advertised power rating of 335 hp (250 kW).

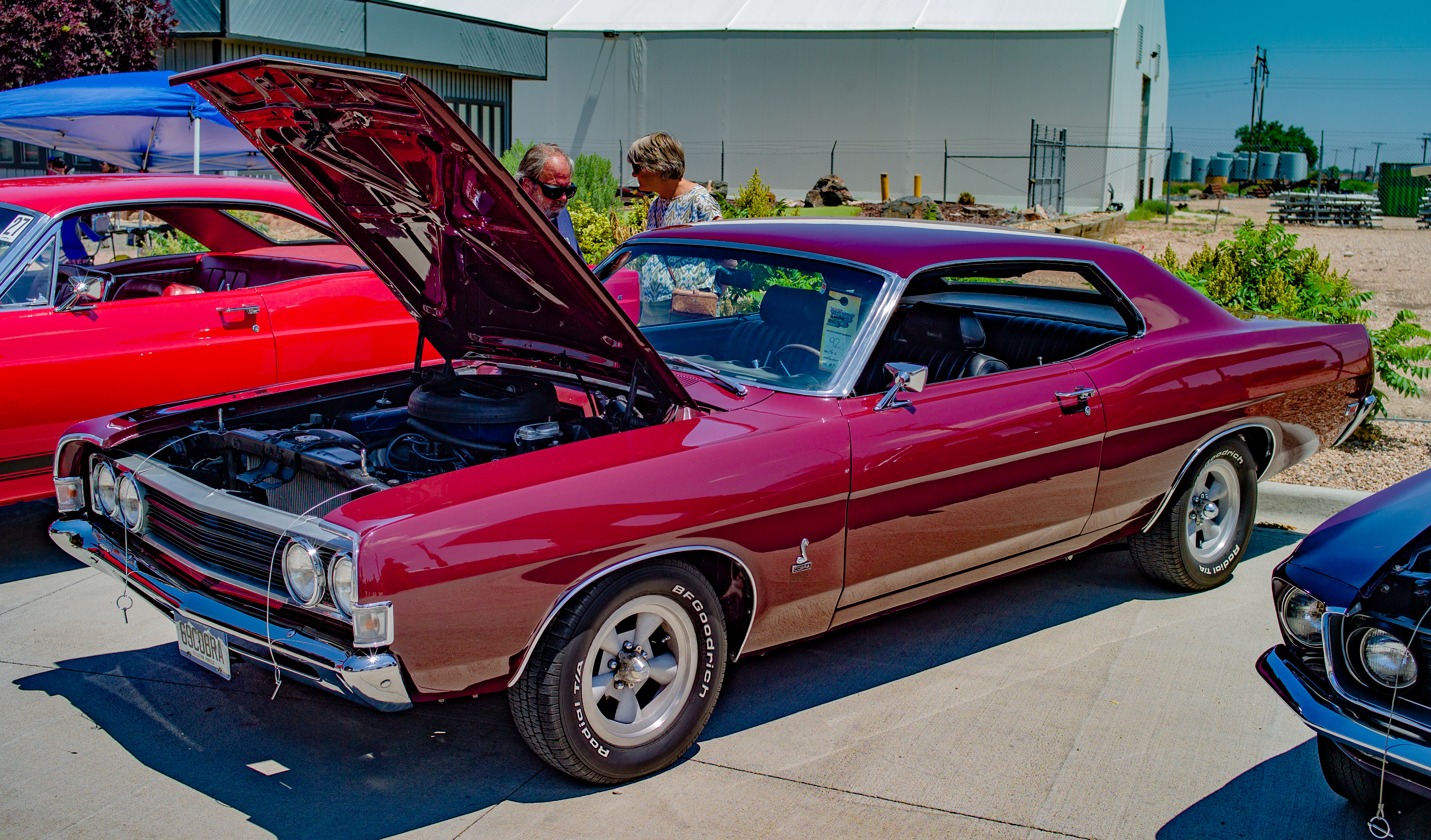
1969 Ford Cobra 2-Door Hardtop

The Cobra was Ford's attempt at making a muscle car package that focused on performance features. As a result, the Cobra came standard with a 428-4V CJ, competition suspension, 4-speed manual transmission and F70-14 tires. The Cobra had a blacked out grille, hood lock pins, and "Cobra" emblems. A hood scoop was standard on Ram Air equipped Cobras, while a non-functional scoop was optional on other Cobras. Early Cobras had a large "Cobra" decal on the front fenders, but this was later replaced with a metal emblem. The Cobra was Ford's response to the successful Plymouth Road Runner, which was a high-performance car at low cost. For this reason, the Cobra had the lesser trim level of the Fairlane 500 to help keep costs low. Road Test magazine wrote the "big engine and whopping torque get the Cobra Jet off the line with smoking tires" in their test of a 1969 Cobra with the Ram Air 428 CJ, four-speed manual, and 3.50 gears. They obtained 15.07 seconds at 95.74 mph (154.08 km/h) for a quarter-mile run; however, according to the article, the elapsed time was likely hampered due to the car not being equipped with a tachometer. Road Test reported difficulty with the factory shifter and stated "we would have liked a Hurst shifter, and might have bettered our times with one."

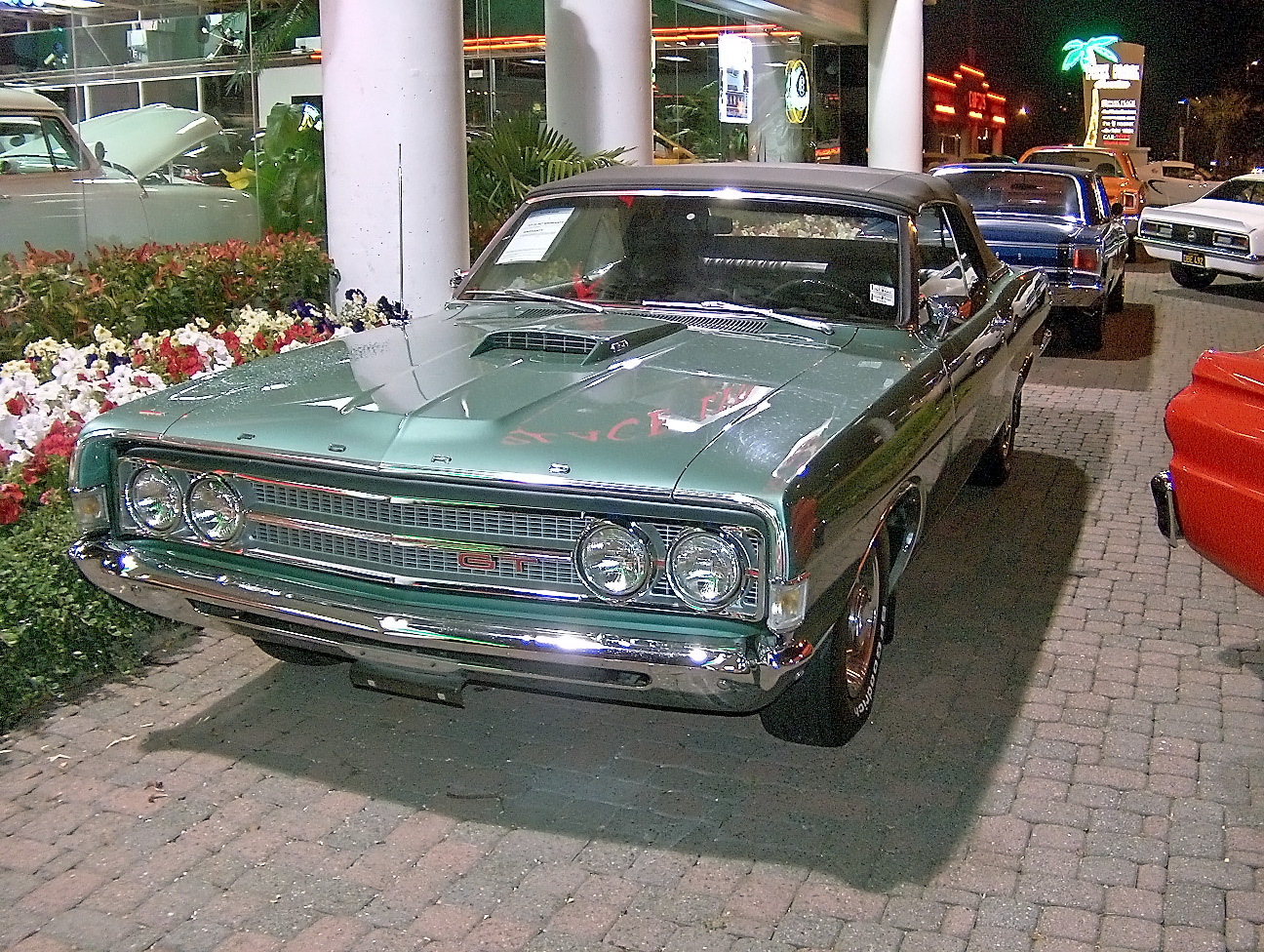
1969 Ford Torino GT Convertible

The Torino GT was relatively unchanged from 1968. The grille received minor updates, including revised divider bars and the GT emblem moved to the lower left corner of the grille. The 'C' stripe was revised, and now ran in straight lines, rather than following the body line like in 1968. All 1969 Torino GT's came equipped a non-functional fibreglass hood scoop that had turn signal indicators at the rear of the scoop. This scoop was functional if the 428-4V and Ram Air induction options were specified. The hood scoop could also be deleted from the GT for a credit. Although the Torino GT could be optioned to include all of the Cobra's performance features, the GT was a more upscale vehicle which had the more deluxe Torino trim.

Ford added one more special high-performance vehicle to its intermediate line-up, the Torino Talladega. See the NASCAR Inspired Torinos section for a detailed information on this model. Ford Torino production decreased for 1969, and a total of 129,054 units were produced. Including Fairlane production, 366,911 cars were produced, slightly down from the 1968 numbers. Torino GTs were the majority of Torinos produced, accounting for 81,822 units produced. Ford did not provide separate production number for the Cobra.

== Second generation (1970–1971) ==
=== 1970 ===
1970 Ford Fairlane/Torino
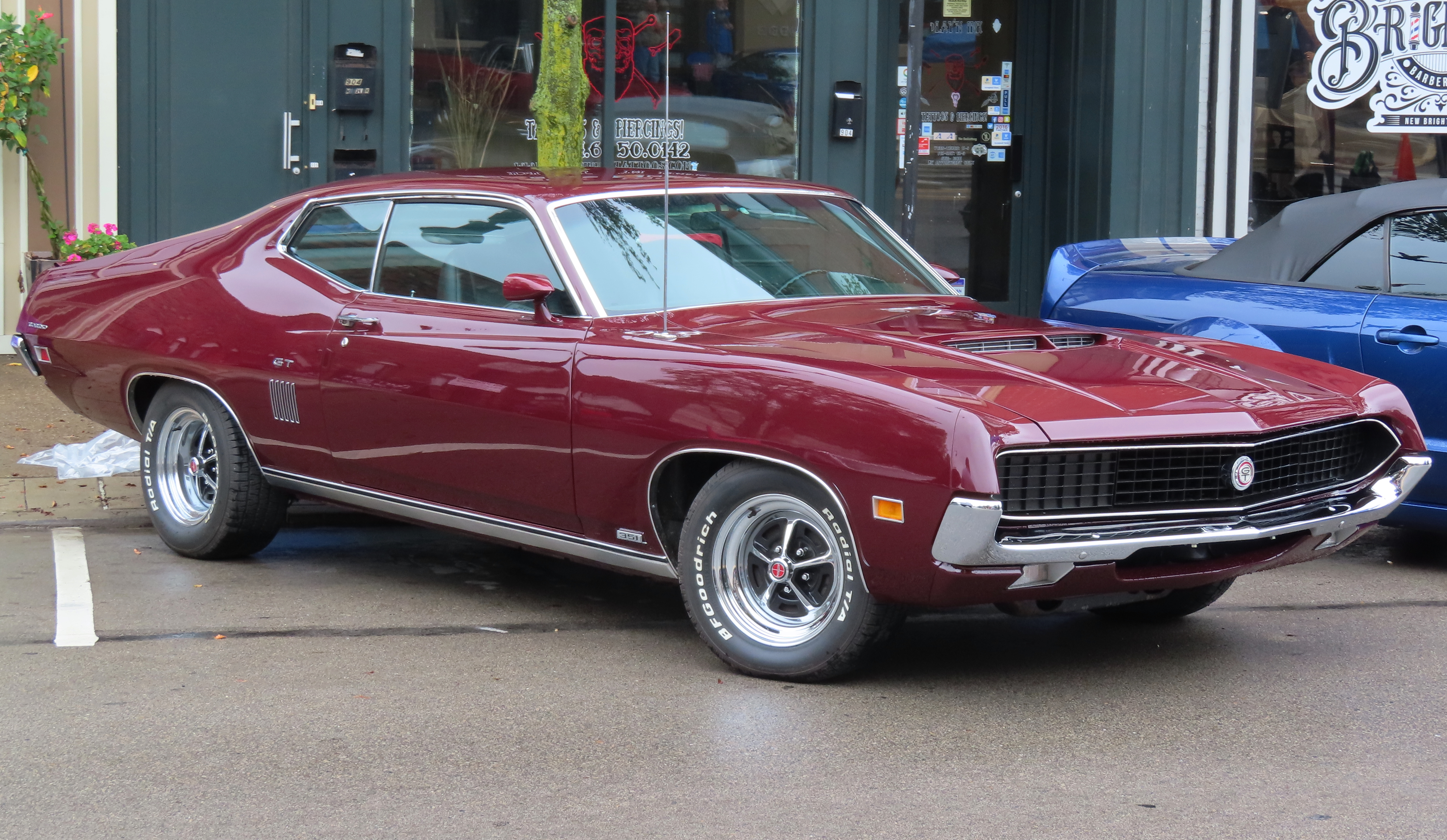
- 1970 Ford Torino GT SportsRoof

Overview
- Designer: Bill Shenk

Body and chassis
- Body style: 2-door sedan 2-door hardtop 2-door fastback 2-door convertible 4-door sedan 4-door hardtop 4-door station wagon
- Chassis: unibody
- Related: Ford Ranchero; Mercury Comet; Mercury Cyclone; Mercury Montego

Powertrain
- Engine: 250 cu in (4.1 L) I6; 302 cu in (4.9 L) Windsor V8; 351 cu in (5.8 L) Windsor V8; 351 cu in (5.8 L) Cleveland V8; 429 cu in (7.0 L) 385 Series V8
- Transmission: 3-speed manual 4-speed manual 3-speed automatic

Dimensions
- Wheelbase: 117.0 in (2,972 mm); 114.0 in (2,896 mm) (wagon)
- Length: 206.2 in (5,237 mm); 209.0 in (5,309 mm) (wagon)
- Width: 76.4 in (1,941 mm) (4-door); 76.7 in (1,948 mm) (2-door); 75.4 in (1,915 mm) (wagon)
- Curb weight: 3,116–3,774 lb (1,413–1,712 kg)*; *Shipping weight

For 1970, the Torino became the primary model and the Fairlane became a sub-series of Torino. Ford moved away from emulating the boxy lines of the full-size Fords to a completely new body for the 1970 Torino/Fairlane line influenced by coke bottle styling. Just as tailfins were influenced by jet aircraft of the 1950s, stylists such as Ford stylist Bill Shenk who designed the 1970 Ford Torino were inspired by supersonic aircraft with narrow waists and bulging forward and rear fuselages needed to reach supersonic speeds (see Area rule).

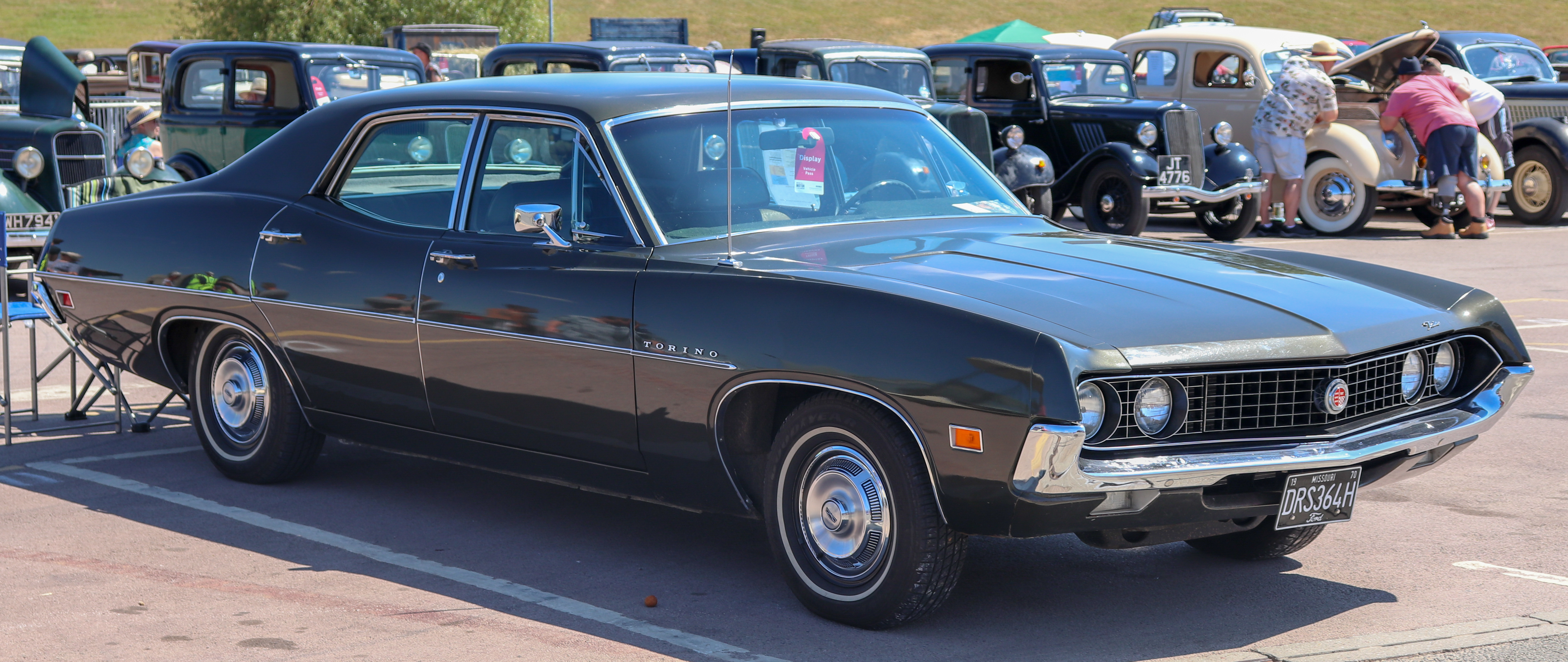
1970 Ford Torino 4-door sedan

The 1970 Torino had more prominent long hood short deck styling, and was longer, lower and wider than the 1969 models. All models had a lower and less formal roofline compared to previous years. The windshield rake was increased, and the SportsRoof models had an even flatter fastback roofline. The Torino had a pointed front end and overall styling appeared much more aerodynamic than years previous. The grille covered the full width of the front fascia and surrounded the quad headlights. The front fender line extended to front door, sloping downward and gradually disappearing in the quarter panel. Both front and rear bumpers were slim tight fitting chromed units, that followed the body lines. The taillights were situated in the rear panel above the bumper, and were now long rectangular units with rounded outer edges.

The model line-up for 1970 initially featured 13 models. The base model "Fairlane 500", was available in a 2-door hardtop, 4-door sedan, and 4-door wagon. Next the mid-level "Torino" was available as a 2-door and 4-door hardtop, a 4-door sedan and station wagon. The 4-door pillarless hardtop was a new body style for the 1970 model year (Chevrolet introduced this body style for its intermediate Chevelle starting in 1966). The "Torino Brougham," the top trim level, was available as a 2-door and 4-door hardtop, and a 4-door station wagon. The sporty "Torino GT" was available as a 2-door SportsRoof and convertible. The performance model, the "Torino Cobra" was available as a 2-door SportsRoof only.

To add to this extensive line-up, the Falcon name was added mid-year as a new entry-level intermediate. The Ford Falcon compact model continued for the first half of the 1970 model year, but was discontinued as it could not meet new federal standards that came into effect on January 1, 1970. As a result, the Falcon model name was used as the new price leader for the intermediate line. The 1970½ Falcon was available as a 2-door and 4-door sedan, and 4-door station wagon. These were the lowest priced intermediate models with less standard features than the Fairlane 500s. The Falcon was the only intermediate that used a rubber floor instead of carpet, and was the only series that offered a pillared 2-door sedan. Also introduced mid-year was a Torino 2-door SportsRoof model, which was marketed as a low price alternative to the GT. With the above mid-year additions, the Ford intermediate line-up consisted of 17 separate models.

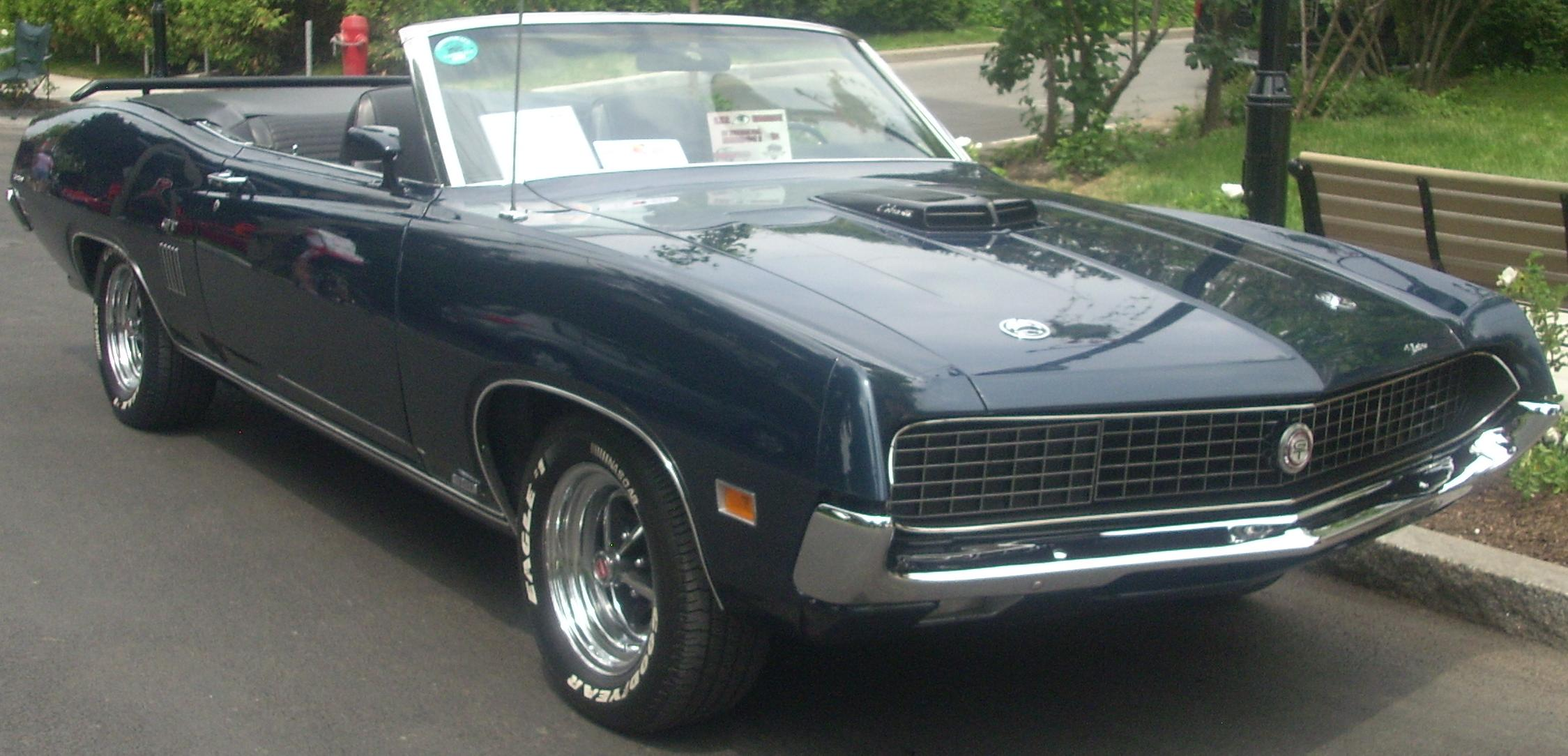
1970 Ford Torino GT convertible

All Torinos grew by about 5 in (127 mm) in length, requiring a stretched chassis and resulting in a longer 117 in (2,972 mm) wheelbase (station wagons used a 114 in (2,900 mm) wheelbase). Weight was up for most models by at least 100 lb (45 kg). The wheel track was widened to 60.5 in (1,537 mm) in front and 60 in (1,524 mm) in the rear to help the Torino improve its road holding abilities. The extra width between the spring towers increased the engine compartment size allowing the larger 385 Series V8s to fit. However, the suspension remained unchanged from the 1969 models. Optional suspension packages included the competition suspension and heavy-duty suspension options. The competition suspension consisted of extra-heavy-duty front and rear springs (500 lb (226.8 kg) per inch front, and 210 lb (95.3 kg) per inch rear), Gabriel shocks (staggered rear shocks on 4-speed cars), and a large 0.95" front sway bar (0.75" standard on other suspensions). In a 1970 Motor Trend test of a Torino Cobra, Motor Trend described the competition suspension as "completely different: The car goes through tight turns in a confidence-inspiring controlled slide. It's all very smooth and unusual."

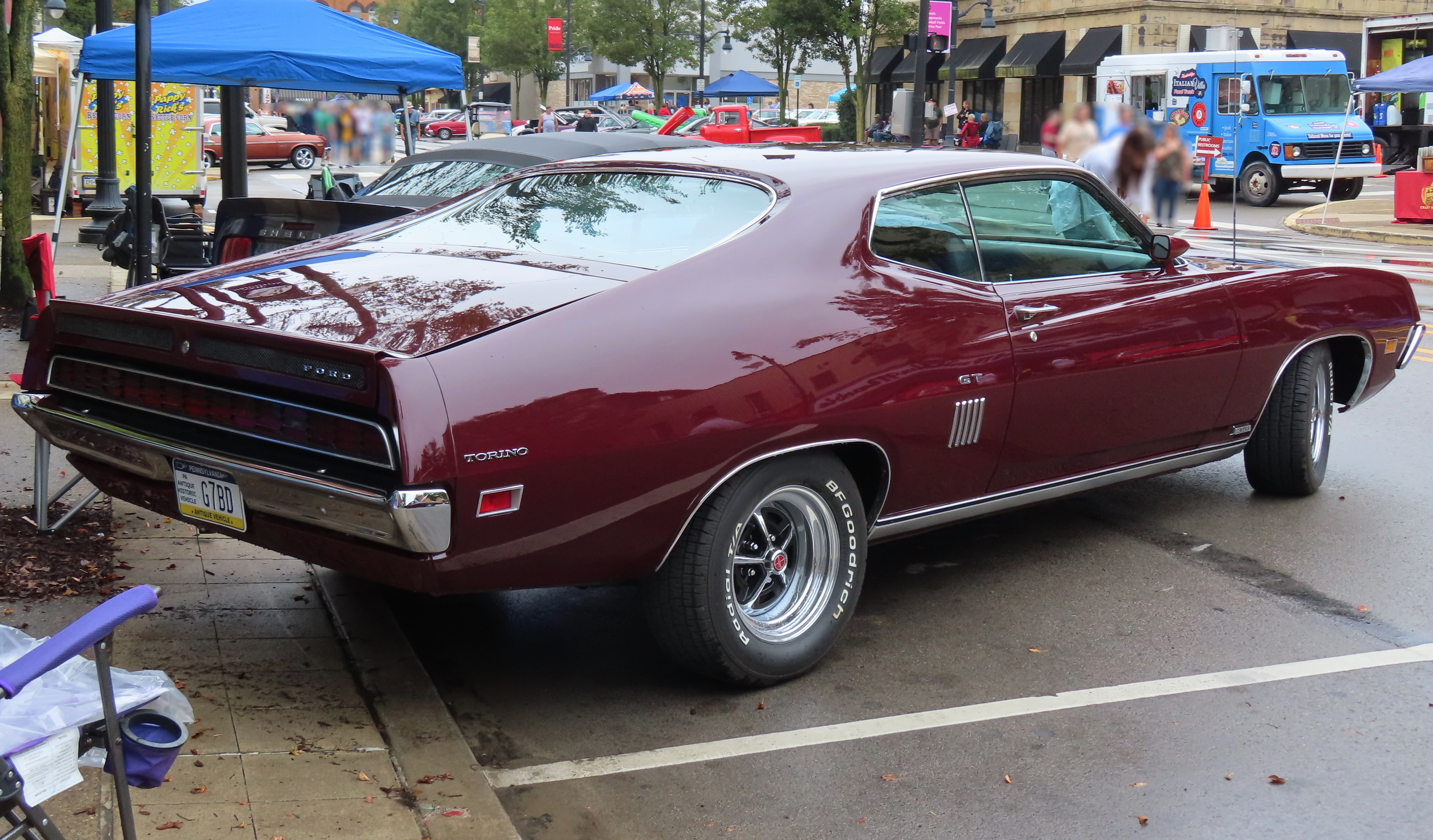
1970 Ford Torino GT SportsRoof rear

Interiors on the Torino were all new for 1970. The dashboard used a linear style speedometer centered on the driver and a new "ribbon" style tachometer was an option for V8 models. A temperature gauge was the only available gauge; oil pressure and electrics were monitored with warning lights only. High back bucket seats were available for all 2-door models, as was an optional console. All 2-door hardtop, SportsRoof and convertible models had "DirectAire" ventilation systems as a standard feature, which eliminated side vent windows. The 2-door sedan, 4-doors and station wagons still had vent windows but the "DirectAire" system was an option for these models. The ignition switch was moved from the instrument panel to the steering column, in compliance with Federal regulations. The steering wheel and column-mounted shifter locked when the key was removed.

The engine line-up received major changes, and only the 250 CID I-6, 302-2V and the 351W-2V were carried over from 1969. Most models continued used the 250 CID I-6 as the standard engine. Optional engines included the 302-2V (standard on GT and Brougham models), 351W-2V, the new 351 Cleveland available with a 2- or 4-barrel carburetor, and the new 429-4V 385 Series V8 (standard on the Cobra models). Selecting the 351-2V on the option list could have resulted in the buyer receiving either the 351W-2V or the 351C-2V; both shared the same power rating and VIN code. The 429-4V was available in three different versions. The first was the 429 Thunder Jet, the standard engine for the Cobra, rated at 360 hp (270 kW). Next was the 429 CJ (Cobra Jet), rated at 370 hp (276 kW), which included a 2-bolt main block, hydraulic lifters, a 700 CFM Holley or 715 CFM Rochester Quadrajet carburetor, and was available with or without Ram-Air. The top option was the 429 SCJ (Super Cobra Jet), rated at 375 hp (280 kW), and was part of the "Drag Pack" option. Selecting the "Drag Pack" option turned a 429 CJ into a 429 SCJ. The drag pack required either the 3.91:1 or the 4.30:1 axle ratio, and included a 4-bolt main engine block, forged pistons, 780 CFM Holley carburetor, engine oil cooler, and solid valve lifters. The "Detroit Locker" rear differential was included when the 4.30:1 axle was ordered while the "Traction-Lock" limited-slip differential was included with the 3.91:1 axle. Ram Air induction was optional on the 351C-4V, 429 CJ and 429 SCJ, but Ram Air did not change the advertised power ratings. The Ram Air option included a "shaker scoop", where the scoop was attached to the top of the air cleaner assembly and protruded through a hole in the hood. A 3-speed transmission was standard on all models except for the Cobra, which came with a 4-speed as standard equipment. The Cruise-O-Matic was optional for all engines while the 4-speed transmission was available on all engines except the six and the 302-2V.

Torino Brougham models came standard with extra exterior and interior trim, finer upholsteries, wheel covers, unique emblems, extra sound insulation and "Hideaway" headlights. "Hideaway" headlights had headlight covers that were styled to look like the grille of the vehicle extended across the front end. When the lights were turned on, vacuum actuators would flip the covers up and out of the way to expose the quad headlamps. Motor Trend wrote that "when you get into a Brougham, it's the same feeling as an LTD, or even, dare we say it, a Continental. But in a more manageable scale." Motor Trend gave accolades to the 1970 Torino Brougham 2-door for its quiet interior that only allowed "the muffled thump of freeway expansion-joints [to] intrude."

The Torino GT came standard with non-functional hood scoop molded into the hood, GT emblems (including the centre of the grille), dual colour-keyed sport mirrors, full width tail lights with a honeycomb effect (the centre portion was only reflective), black decklid appliques, and hub caps with wheel trim rings. Standard tires for the GT were E70-14 fibreglass belted tires, while convertibles wore F70-14s. Bucket seats and console were not longer standard equipment on the GT, but remained as options. Other new options for the Torino GT were a reflective laser stripe, which ran down the middle of the side of the Torino from the front fender to the door, and Hideaway headlamps. Motor Trend magazine tested a 1970 Torino GT SportsRoof with a 429 CJ, C-6 Automatic, and 3.50:1 gears, and obtained a 0 – 60 mph (97 km/h) time of 6.0 seconds, while the quarter-mile took 14.4 seconds at 100.2 mph (161.3 km/h).

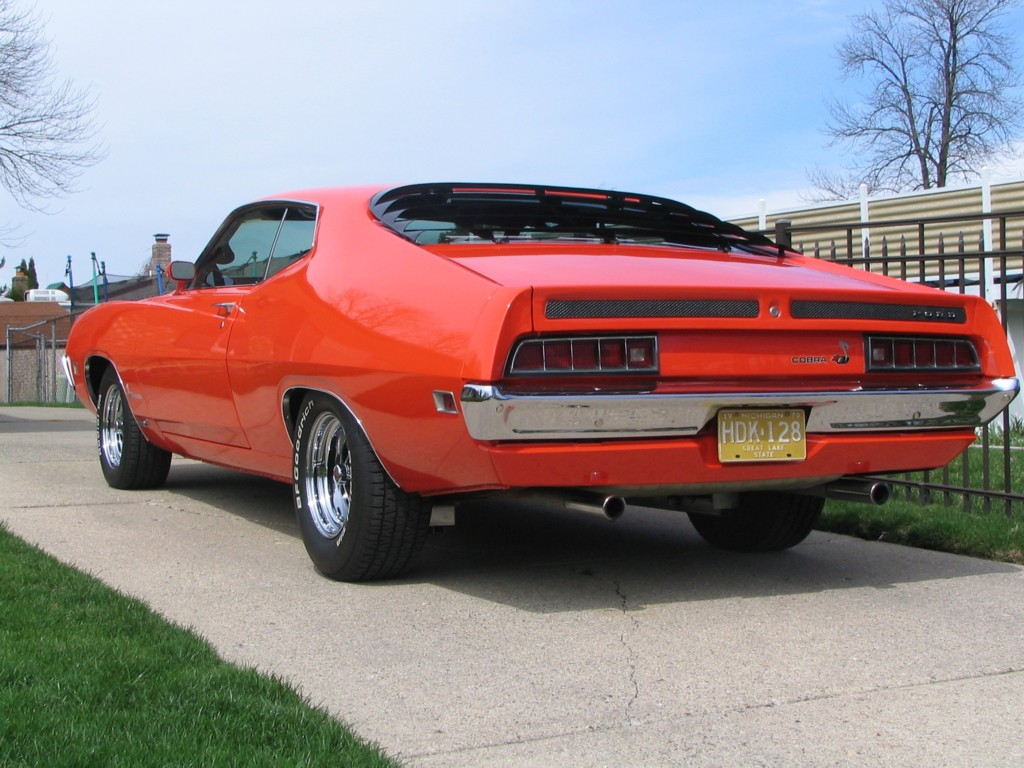
1970 Ford Torino Cobra shown with optional sport slats and Magnum 500 wheels

The Torino Cobra remained the top performance model, but was a lower level of trim than the Torino GT. The Cobra was only available as a SportsRoof, and came standard with a 4-speed close ratio transmission, Hurst shifter, competition suspension, flat black hood and grille, 7-inch-wide wheels, F70-14 tires with raised white letters, twist style exposed hood latches and "Cobra" emblems. New options included 15 in (380 mm) Magnum 500 wheels with F60-15 tires and flat black "Sport Slats" for the rear window (both also available on the Torino GT). Performance was strong even though the Torino was heavier for 1970. Motor Trend tested a 1970 Torino Cobra equipped with the Ram Air 370 hp (276 kW), 429 CJ, C-6 automatic and 3.50:1 rear axle, and it went from 0 – 60 mph (97 km/h) in 6.0 seconds while taking 14.5 seconds at 100 mph (161 km/h) to go through the quarter-mile. Motor Trend wrote "The weight obviously helped traction, as it was fairly easy to accelerate away from a standing start with only a modicum of wheelspin." Motor Trend also tested a 1970 Cobra with a 429 SCJ, 4-speed and 3.91:1 gears, and resulted in a 5.8-second 0 – 60 mph (97 km/h) time, with a 13.99-second quarter-mile at 101.0 mph (162.5 km/h). Super Stock and Drag Illustrated bested that time, in their test of a Torino Cobra equipped with the 375 hp (280 kW), 429 SCJ, C-6 automatic, and 3.91:1 rear gears. They were able to run the quarter-mile in 13.63 seconds at 105.95 mph (170.51 km/h), however, this was after the carburetor had been modified (improved power valve, larger primary and secondary jets). Super Stock and Drag Illustrated fitted a pair of slicks to the same Torino and ran a 13.39 seconds at 106.96 mph (172.14 km/h).

Station wagon models for 1970 were offered initially in three different levels: the Fairlane 500 wagon, the Torino wagon, and the Torino Squire wagon. Mid-year 1970, the Falcon wagon became base station wagon. The sheetmetal on the station wagons was not changed as drastically as 2-door and 4-door models. The majority of the sheetmetal behind the front doors was carried over from the 1968–69 body style. As a result, the wagons appeared more upright and square than the sedans and coupes. The Torino Squire, the top level wagon, featured simulated woodgrain sides, headlamp covers and a trim level similar to the Torino Brougham sedan. The Squire came standard with a 302-2V V8 engine and power front disc brakes; other wagons had 4-wheel drums and the 250 CID I-6. All wagons used Ford's "Magic Doorgate" two-way tailgate, but the power rear window, rear-facing third seat and roof rack were options. Ford offered a trailering towing package for all Torinos that would allow Torino to have a Class II tow rating (3,500 lb (1,588 kg)). This package included heavy-duty suspension, heavy-duty battery and alternator, extra cooling package, and power front disc brakes. The 351 cu in (5.8 L) or 429 cu in (7.0 L) engine, power steering and the Cruise-O-Matic transmission were required options.

Overall, 1970 was a successful year for Torino. It was a well received car by the automotive press and was selected as the Motor Trend Car of the Year for 1970. Motor Trend said the Torino was "Not really a car line in the old sense, but a system of specialty cars, each for a different use ... from luxury to performance." Ford produced 230,411 Torinos for 1970, along with 110,029 Fairlanes and 67,053 Falcons, for a total production of 407,493 units.

=== 1971 ===
1971 Ford Torino
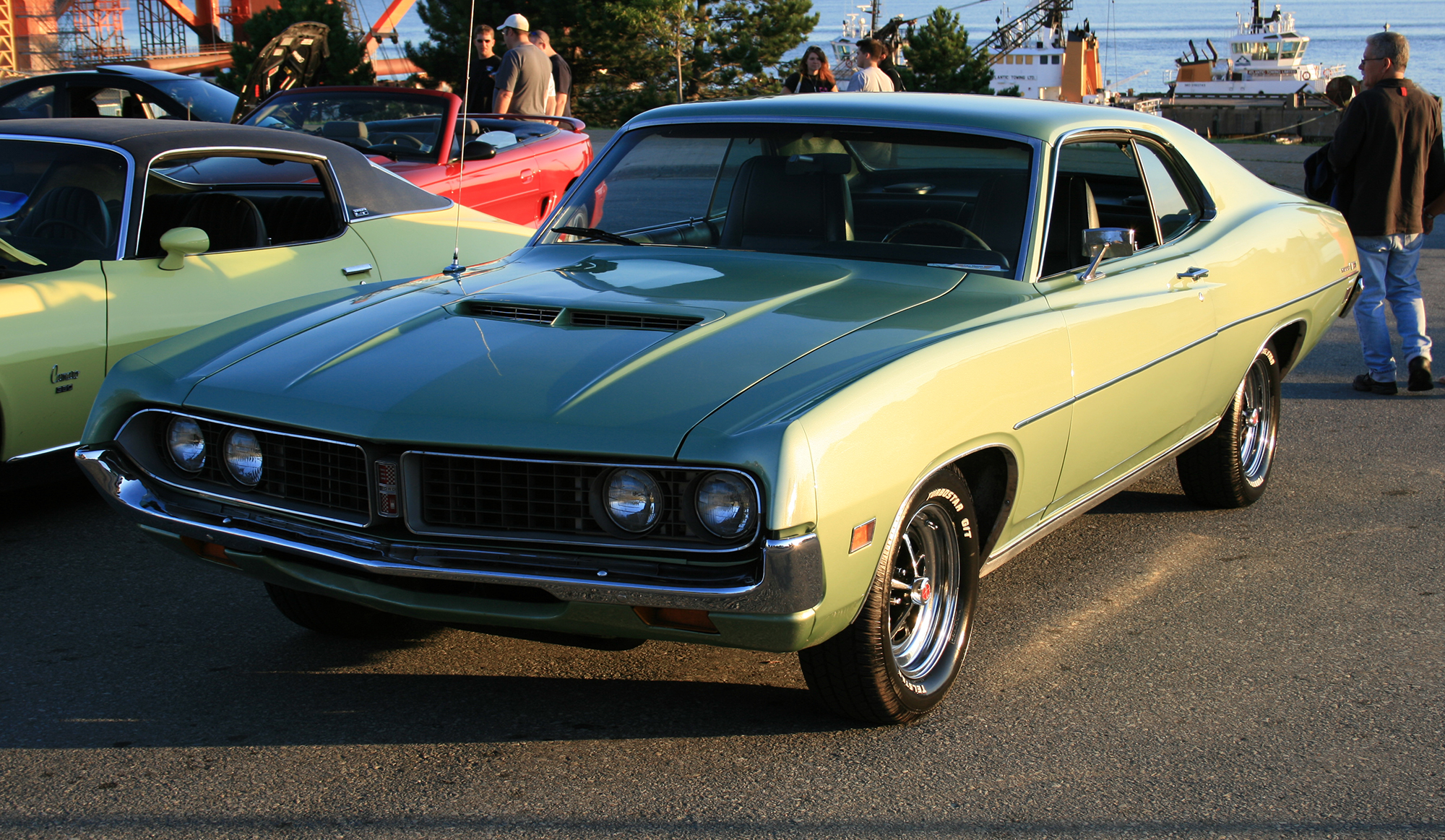
- 1971 Ford Torino 500 2-Door Hardtop (factory hood scoop not original to this model)

Body and chassis
- Body style: 2-door hardtop 2-door fastback 2-door convertible 4-door sedan 4-door hardtop 4-door station wagon
- Chassis: unibody
- Related: Ford Ranchero; Mercury Cyclone; Mercury Montego

Powertrain
- Engine: 250 cu in (4.1 L) I6; 302 cu in (4.9 L) Windsor V8; 351 cu in (5.8 L) Windsor V8; 351 cu in (5.8 L) Cleveland V8; 429 cu in (7.0 L) 385 Series V8
- Transmission: 3-speed manual 4-speed manual 3-speed automatic

Dimensions
- Wheelbase: 117.0 in (2,972 mm); 114.0 in (2,896 mm) (wagon)
- Length: 206.2 in (5,237 mm); 209.0 in (5,309 mm) (wagon)
- Width: 76.4 in (1,941 mm) (4-door); 76.7 in (1,948 mm) (2-door); 75.4 in (1,915 mm) (wagon)
- Curb weight: 3,141–3,663 lb (1,425–1,662 kg)*; *Shipping weight

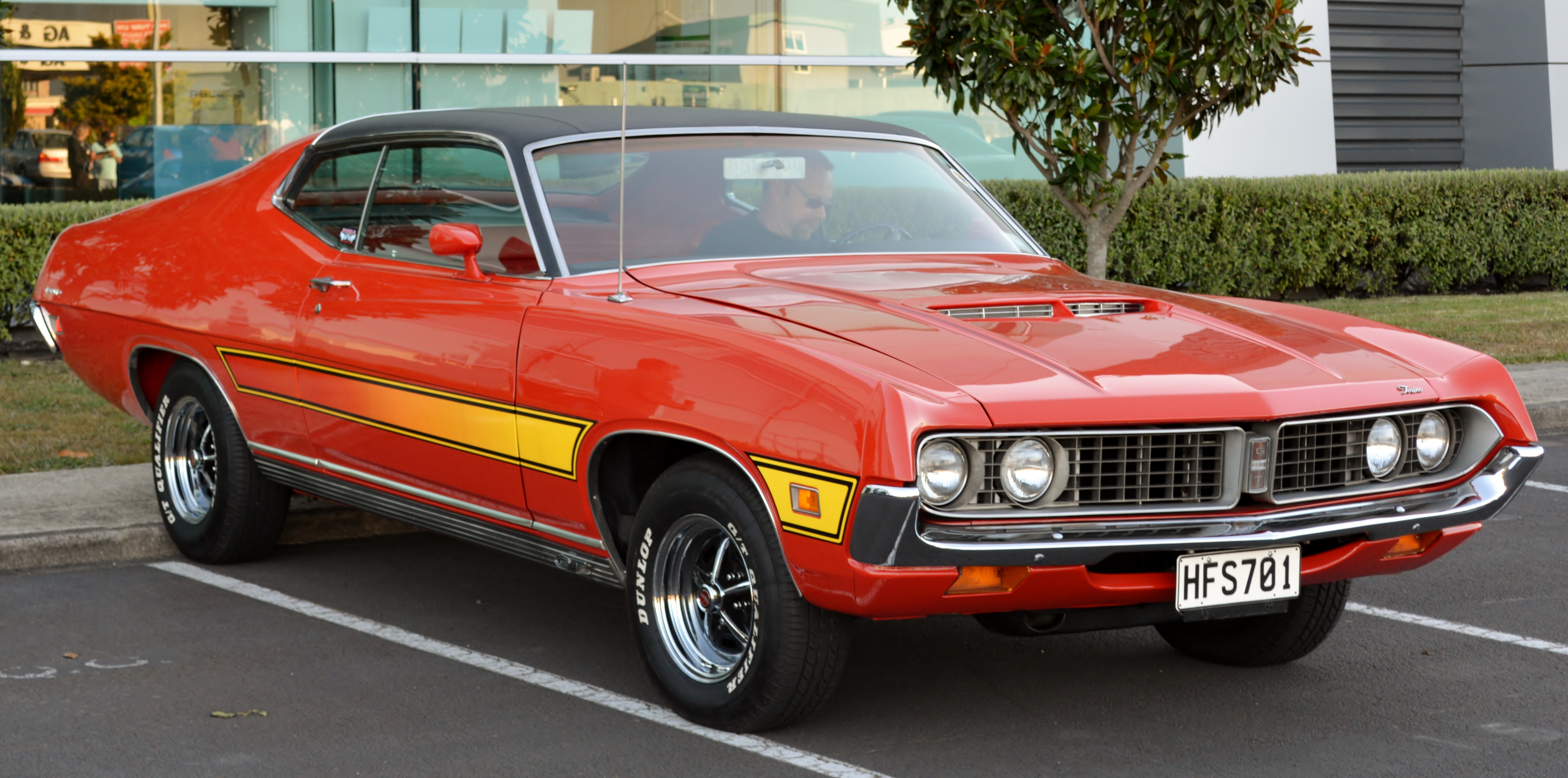
1971 Ford Torino GT SportsRoof with optional vinyl roof

For the 1971 model year, Ford limited changes to its intermediate line to minor revisions. The biggest change for 1971 was the decision to drop the Fairlane and Falcon model names. The Torino line-up consisted of 14 models. The base model was the "Torino", available as a 2-door hardtop, 4-door sedan and 4-door station wagon. Next was the mid-level "Torino 500", available as a 2-door hardtop and SportsRoof, 4-door sedan and hardtop and a 4-door station wagon. The top-of-the-line Torino remained the "Torino Brougham", available as a 2-door and 4-door hardtop, while the "Torino Squire" remained the station wagon equivalent to the Brougham. The "Torino GT" was offered as a 2-door SportsRoof and convertible, while the "Torino Cobra" was still only available as a 2-door SportsRoof.

The styling was mostly unchanged for the 1971 models, save for minor revisions to trim and the grilles. The grille on the 1971 Torinos was divided by a vertical division in the centre for all models except the Cobra. The Cobra used the same grille as the 1970 model. A revised emblem was located on the vertical grille divider for all Torinos except the Cobra. The Torino 500, Brougham, Squire wagon and GT models had the hideaway headlamp option available, which included a unique grille with a less prominent divider bar.

The engine line-up remained almost identical to the 1970 model year, with most models featuring the 250 CID I-6 as standard. Broughams, Squires and GTs continued to have the 302-2V as standard, while the Torino Cobra was downgraded to a 351-4V as its standard engine. All engines, other than the 429s, saw a slight drop in compression, which also resulted in a corresponding drop in power ratings. Other manufacturers were following suit, including Torino's main competitor Chevrolet's Chevelle, which had an even larger drop in compression on all of its 1971 engines. Ram Air induction was an option on the 351-4V, 429 CJ, and the 429 SCJ.

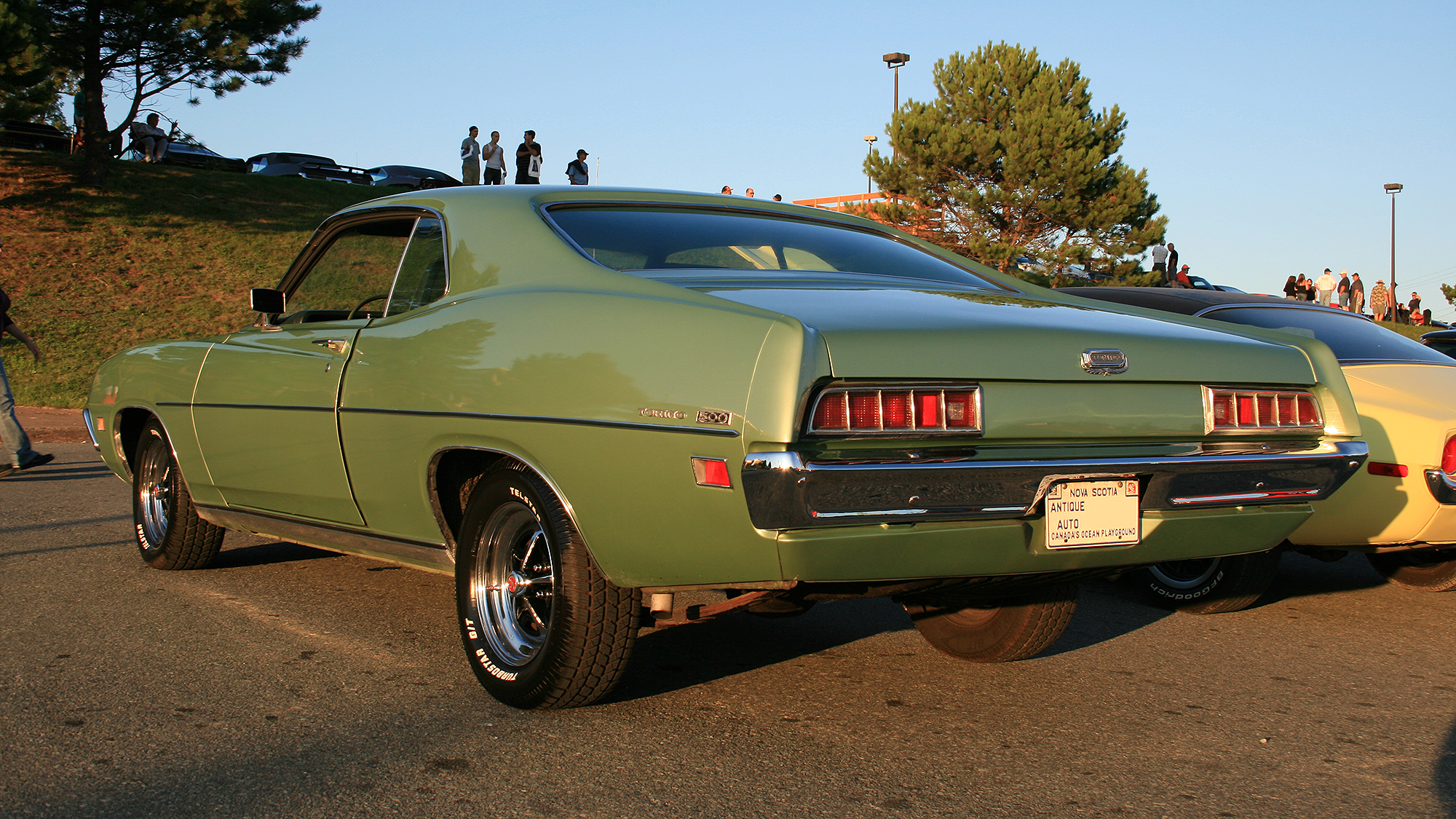
1971 Ford Torino 500 2-door Hardtop

The Torino Cobra came with a 351-4V rated at 285 hp (213 kW) and it also included a 4-speed manual with a Hurst shifter, F70-14 tires Cobra emblems, competition suspension, hub caps, and a blacked out grille. A new option for Cobra models was the reflective laser stripe, formerly an option for just GT models. Although the high-performance 429 Cobra Jets were still rated at the same power as the 1970 models, Super Stock and Drag Illustrated had disappointing results from its test of a 1971 Torino Cobra. They tested a Cobra equipped with the 370 hp (280 kW), 429 CJ, C-6 automatic, 3.50:1 gears, and were only able to turn a best quarter-mile time of about 15 seconds at 97 mph (156 km/h). The article states "this car would really respond to a good ignition system, a better intake manifold, a larger carburetor and a set of headers." Cars magazine had better luck with their test of a 1971 Torino Cobra equipped with the Ram Air 370 hp (280 kW), 429 CJ, C-6 automatic, and 3:50:1 gears. They went through the quarter-mile in 14.5 seconds at 102 mph (164 km/h) in the 4,100 lb (1,900 kg) Torino. The former time was obtained after the Cars staff did some "proper tuning."

The GT was the Torino's sporty/high trim model and included a 302-2V engine, dual colour keyed racing mirrors, GT identification, a non-functional hood scoop, hub caps and trim, rings, chrome trim on the foot pedals, full width taillights with honeycomb effect, and E70-14 tires (F70-14 on convertibles). Torino GT's had a shaker scoop when equipped with the Ram Air Induction. The Torino Brougham was Torino's luxury oriented model. This model included Brougham ornamentation, additional trim, full wheel covers, additional sound proofing, and cloth upholstery. Hideaway headlamps were no longer standard, but remained an option. Motor Trend tested a 1971 Torino Brougham 4-door and stated "The [seat] cushioning and support was excellent. ..[and] the upholstery was magnificent."

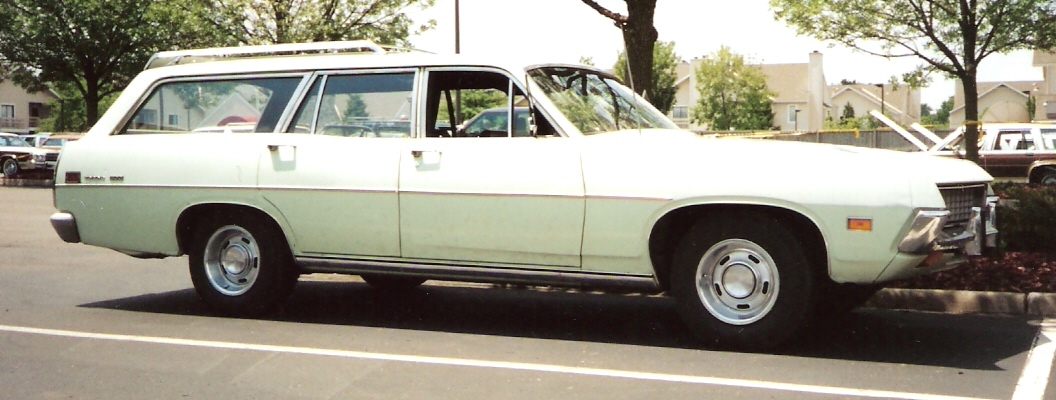
1971 Ford Torino 500 Wagon

Production for 1971 was 326,463 units, slightly lower than 1970 Ford intermediate production. Only 1,613 Torino GT Convertibles and 3,054 Torino Cobras were produced for 1971.

== Third generation (1972–1976) ==
=== 1972 ===
1972 Ford Torino
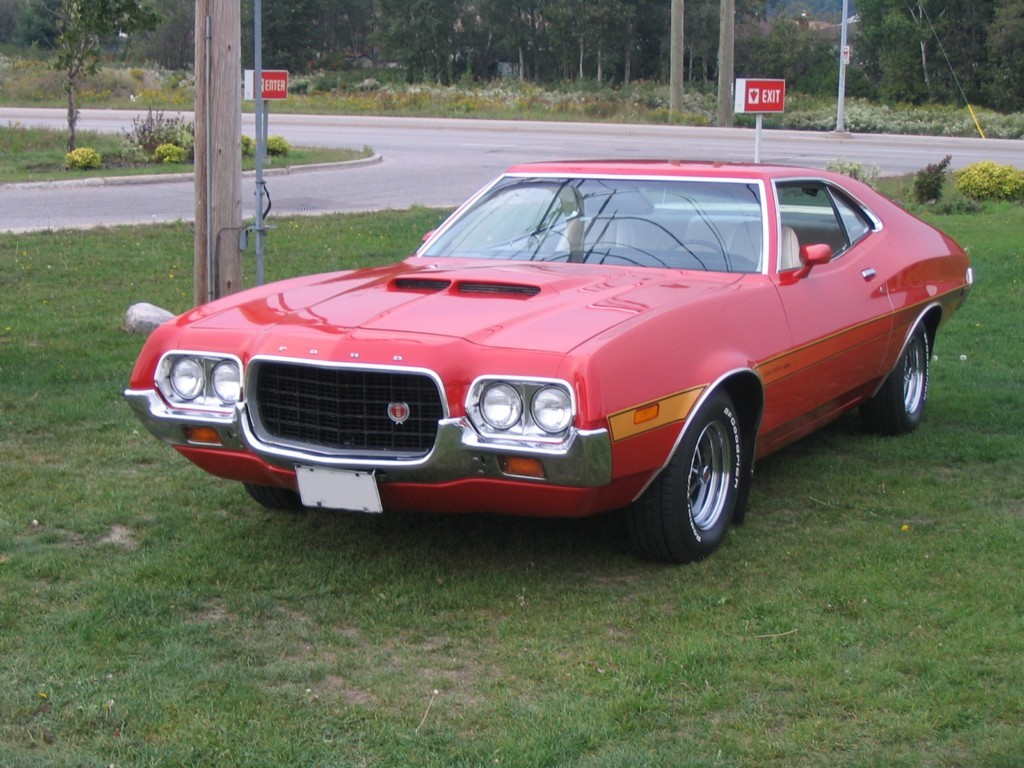
- 1972 Ford Gran Torino Sport 2-Door SportsRoof

Body and chassis
- Body style: 2-door hardtop 2-door fastback 4-door sedan 5-door station wagon
- Chassis: body-on-frame
- Related: Ford Ranchero; Mercury Cyclone; Mercury Montego

Powertrain
- Engine: 250 cu in (4.1 L) Thriftpower I6; 302 cu in (4.9 L) Windsor V8; 351 cu in (5.8 L) Windsor V8; 351 cu in (5.8 L) Cleveland V8; 400 cu in (6.6 L) 335 series V8; 429 cu in (7.0 L) 385 Series V8
- Transmission: 3-speed manual 4-speed manual 3-speed automatic

Dimensions
- Wheelbase: 114.0 in (2,896 mm) (2-door); 118.0 in (2,997 mm) (4-door, wagon)
- Length: 203.7 in (5,174 mm)/207.3 in (5,265 mm) (2-door); 207.7 in (5,276 mm)/211.3 in (5,367 mm) (4-door); 211.6 in (5,375 mm)/215.1 in (5,464 mm) (wagon)
- Width: 79.3 in (2,014 mm); 79.0 in (2,007 mm) (wagon)
- Curb weight: 3,369–4,042 lb (1,528–1,833 kg)*; *Shipping weight

For 1972, the Torino was redesigned using many characteristics carried over from the previous generation. The 1972 Torino styling emphasized the "long hood short deck" look and had strong elements of coke bottle styling. The Torino line-up was revamped with three models "Torino," "Gran Torino" and "Gran Torino Sport." The most radical change was a large eggcrate grille in an oval opening on Gran Torinos. Tom McCahill stated, "the gaping grille looks a little like it was patterned after Namu, the killer whale," but also stated that the Torino had "kind of pleasing, no-nonsense styling." Gran Torinos had chrome bezels surrounding the headlamps on each side of the large oval grille. Base Torinos had a full-width argent eggcrate grille that surrounded the headlights. Base Torinos also used a unique hood and front bumper differentiating it from the Gran Torino models. The Torino's front fenders were flared around the wheel opening and the rear quarter panel had strong character line extending to the rear bumper. The windshield rake was increased to a faster 60-degree angle, while the A-pillars and roof were thinner. Despite these changes, structural integrity remained the same as 1971 models. A full width rear bumper had inset rectangular tail lights with pointed ends. "DirectAire" ventilation was standard equipment for all Torino models, resulting in vent windows vanishing. The Torino incorporated new safety features for 1972, including new flush mount door handles and side door guard rails.

The new model line-up reduced the number of models from 14 in 1971 to 9 in 1972. The convertible and 4-door hardtops were discontinued but all other body styles remained. The 4-door hardtops and sedans were replaced with 4-door "pillared hardtops." This was Ford's term for 4-door sedans with frameless door glass and a thin "B" pillar. This configuration was also used by station wagons. "Torino" remained the base series, but the mid-level Torino 500 was renamed "Gran Torino". The Torino Brougham was reduced to an option package for the Gran Torino, and Torino GT became "Gran Torino Sport." The Torino and Gran Torino were available as a 2-door hardtop and a 4-door sedan; the Gran Torino Sport was available as a 2-door hardtop and SportsRoof. The station wagon line-up consisted of three models: "Torino," "Gran Torino," and "Gran Torino Squire" with the simulated woodgrain on the exterior body panels. The Cobra model was discontinued as the Torino line was refocused toward luxury and de-emphasized performance.

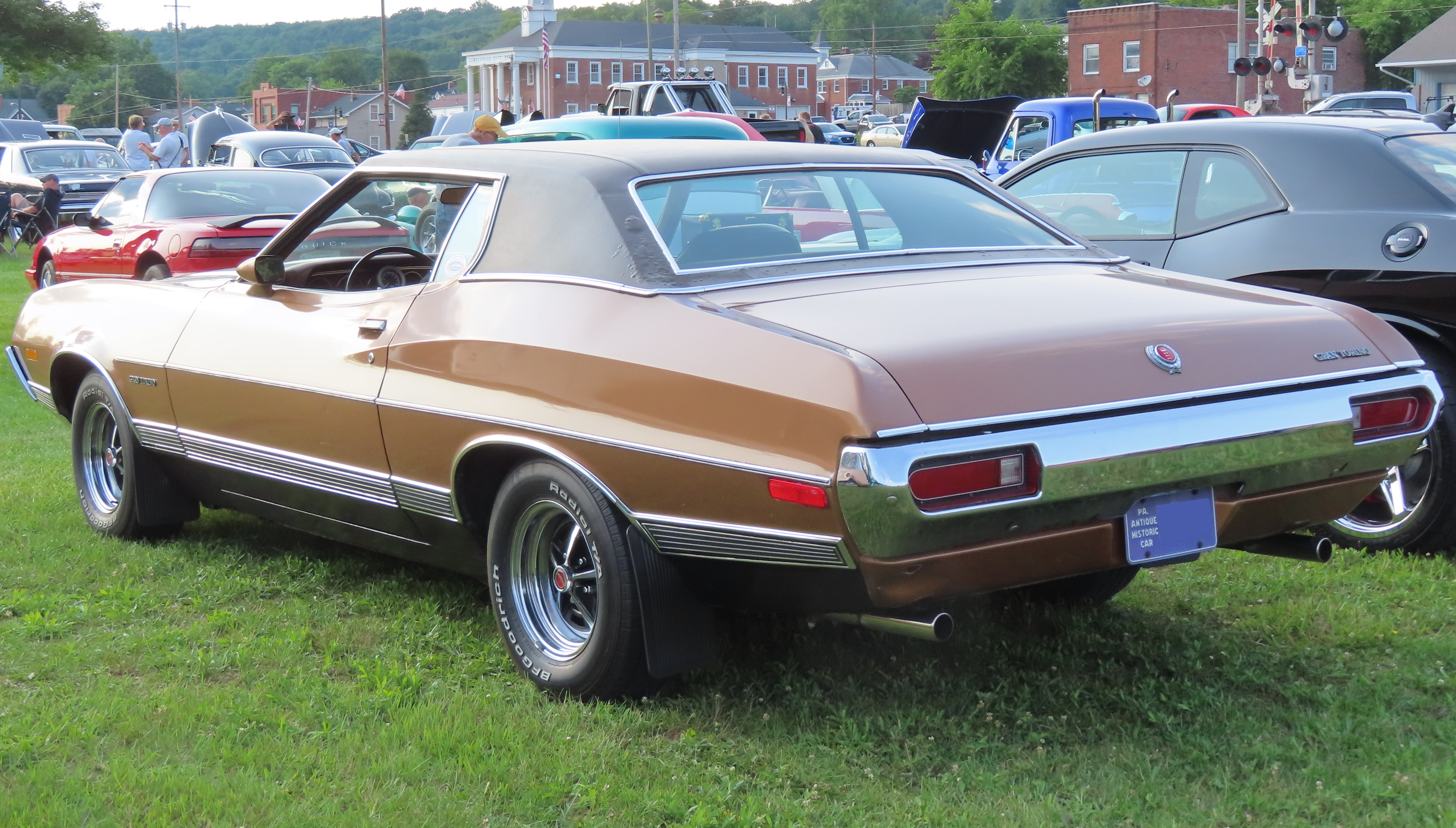
1972 Ford Gran Torino 2-door hardtop with formal roof

The biggest change for the Torino was the switch to body-on-frame construction from the unit-construction of the 1971 models. The new chassis was a perimeter design that was used to help give the Torino a quieter and more isolated ride. It featured an energy-absorbing S-shaped front end, torque boxes to isolate road shock, fourteen rubber body mounts and five cross members. The front suspension used a short/long control arm design, with a computer-selected coil spring mounted on the strut stabilized lower control arm, as in the fullsize Ford. The rear used a four-link suspension, which Ford called "Stabul," with a computer-selected coil spring mounted on a solid axle. The wheel track increased by at least 2 in (51 mm) over 1971 models. Motor Trend stated the "road isolation and vibrational dampening is superb" in its test of a 1972 Gran Torino Brougham 4-door. Ford offered two suspension options, a heavy-duty and competition suspension. The heavy-duty suspension included a larger front sway bar, and heavy-duty springs and shocks. Competition suspension, only available in two-door models, included the most heavy-duty springs and shocks, heavy-duty rear upper control arms and bushings, a larger front sway bar, and a rear sway bar. This was the first year that a rear sway bar was offered in the Torino. Front disc brakes were standard equipment on all Torinos, which no other American intermediate (other than its sister car the Mercury Montego) offered in 1972. Gran Torino Squire station wagons had power brakes as standard equipment, but it remained an option for all other models. Further, it was a mandatory option for all 429 cu in (7.0 L) powered models. The power steering was completely revised to be integral in the steering box, rather than the external booster style used in previous years. All Torinos used 14-inch wheels, while 15-inch wheels were used for exclusively by police and taxi models.

A significant change to Torino chassis for 1972 was the use of separate wheelbases for 2-doors and 4-doors. Starting in 1968, GM had begun to use a shorter wheelbase for its 2-door intermediates, and a longer one for the 4-doors. This allowed for stylists to make fewer compromises when trying to turn a 2-door into a 4-door. Chrysler also followed suit in 1971, although its intermediate coupes and sedans didn't even share body panels. The 1972 Torino used a 114 in (2,896 mm) wheelbase for 2-doors and a 118 in (2,997 mm) wheelbase for 4-doors, station wagons, and the related Ranchero. Like GM intermediates, the Torino 2-door and 4-door shared many body panels. Overall, the size and weight for Torino had increased for 1972, following the longer, lower, wider trend. Gran Torino sedans saw a 5 in (127 mm) length increase, while 2-doors had a 1 in (25 mm) increase in length. Base Torino sedans were only 1 in (25 mm) longer, and 2-doors were 3 in (76 mm) shorter than 1971 models. Weight increased significantly for 4-door and station wagon models, while 2-doors had a small increase in weight.

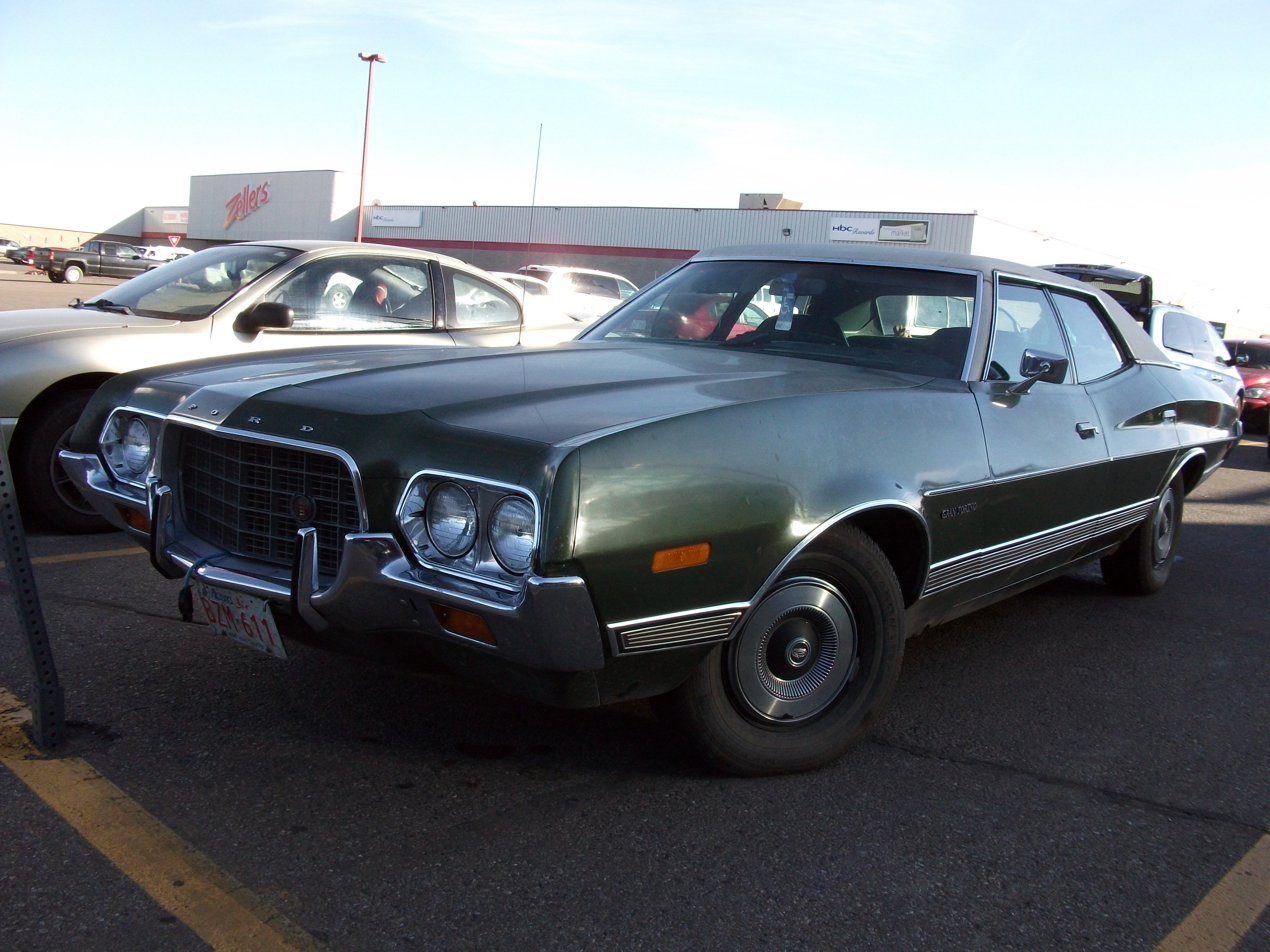
1972 Ford Gran Torino 4-door pillared hardtop

Interiors were all new and featured an improved instrument panel, that used ABS plastic for much of its construction. The standard instrument cluster featured five equally sized round pods which contained a speedometer, fuel gauge, and temperature gauge, along with various warning lights. The leftmost pod was a vent for the "DirectAire" ventilation system. A clock was optional with the standard instrument package. The "Instrumentation Group", available on all V8 models, featured two large round pods centered on the steering wheel, containing the speedometer (with trip odometer) and a tachometer. A third equal sized pod on the left contained the DirectAire vent. The instrument cluster included an ammeter, fuel gauge, temperature gauge, oil pressure gauge and clock set in a smaller stacked of pods near the centre of the instrument panel. The seats were also new for 1972, the standard front bench seat changed to a high back integrated headrest for the outboard seating positions, but high back bucket seats remained an option on 2-door models. Ford offered "comfort weave" vinyl inserts on the bucket seats for the last time in 1972. An optional 6-way power bench seat, replaced the 4-way seat offered in 1971.

The base engine was the 250 cu in (4.1 L) inline-six in all models except the Gran Torino Squire station wagon and the Gran Torino Sport which used the 302-2V small-block V8. The engine options included the 302-2V, a 351-2V ("Windsor" or "Cleveland"), a 351C-4V "Cobra Jet" (CJ), a 400-2V, and a 429-4V. The 400-2V was a new engine to the Torino line-up, and was part of the 335 series engine family like the 351 Cleveland. The 429-4V was not a high-performance engine like the Cobra Jets of previous years; instead, it was a high torque, low revving engine. Emissions and low-lead fuel requirements had become more strict for 1972. To meet these requirements, compression ratios on all Torino engines were dropped to at least 8.5:1, and all engines ran on regular gasoline. These engines generally produced less power than their predecessors in 1971, although this was exaggerated due to the switch to the new SAE net bhp ratings from the SAE gross figures used in 1971. As a result, the power loss was not as dramatic as the numbers suggest, and the horsepower figures are not directly comparable. All models came equipped with a three-speed manual transmission as a standard equipment. The Cruise-O-Matic was optional, but was a mandatory option for the 351-2V, 400-2V and 429-4V. The 351-4V CJ required either the 4-speed or the Cruise-O-Matic transmissions as mandatory options.

The only performance engine for 1972 was the 351-4V CJ. The 351-4V CJ offered a number of performance enhancing features not offered on the 1970–71 351C-4V. It included a special intake manifold, modified camshaft, special valve springs and dampers, a 750 CFM Motorcraft Carburetor, 4-bolt main bearing caps and 2.5 in (63.5 mm) dual exhaust. Dual exhaust and the 4-speed transmission option were exclusive to the 351-CJ. A Ram Air Induction system was available briefly during the early model year, and could be equipped on 351 CJ and 429 powered cars. Performance from the 1972 351 CJ was competitive with the 1970–71 Torinos with the high compression 351-4V. Car and Driver tested a 351 CJ, 4-speed Gran Torino Sport SportsRoof with 3.50:1 gears to have a 0 – 60 mph (97 km/h) time of 6.8 seconds. Car and Driver did not publish its quarter-mile times, but Cars magazine tested a Gran Torino Sport SportsRoof with a 351 CJ, C-6 automatic, and 3.50 gears to run through the quarter-mile in 15.40 seconds.

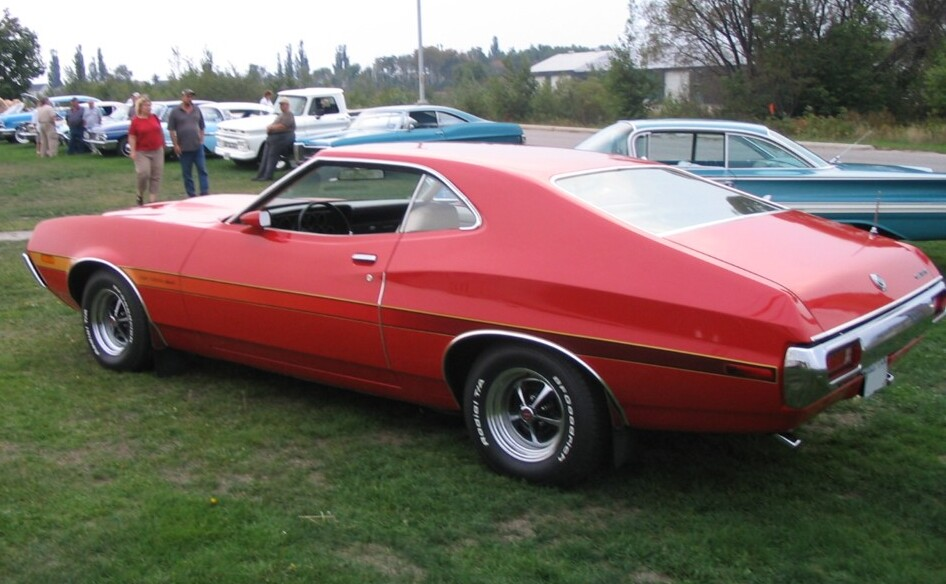
1972 Ford Gran Torino Sport 2-Door SportsRoof with optional laser stripe and Magnum 500 Wheels

The Gran Torino Sport was offered in two body styles: A 2-door formal hardtop and a 2-door SportsRoof. The Gran Torino Sport included an integrated hood scoop, twin colour-keyed racing mirrors, molded plastic door panels unique to the Sport model, body-side and wheel lip moldings, and F70-14 tires (E70-14 on hardtop models). A revised full body length laser stripe was an option for all Torino 2-door models. It replaced the chrome side moldings and was available in four colours to match the exterior paint. Ford offered an option package for the driving enthusiast called the "Rallye Equipment Group." This grouped all the performance options together including the Instrumentation Group, Competition Suspension, G70-14 tires with raised white letters, and a Hurst shifter. The option group came standard with a 351CJ-4V and 4-speed but the 429-4V and the Cruise-O-Matic were optional. The competition suspension was highly regarded by Tom McCahill of Mechanix illustrated, as well as Motor Trend and Car and Driver as being less harsh than past Torino performance suspensions, while still offering excellent handling. Motor Trend described the suspension as "Unlike the super heavy-duty springs of years past, the folks at Ford have managed to produce superior ride control without harshness. It takes a ride in one [Torino] to truly appreciate it."

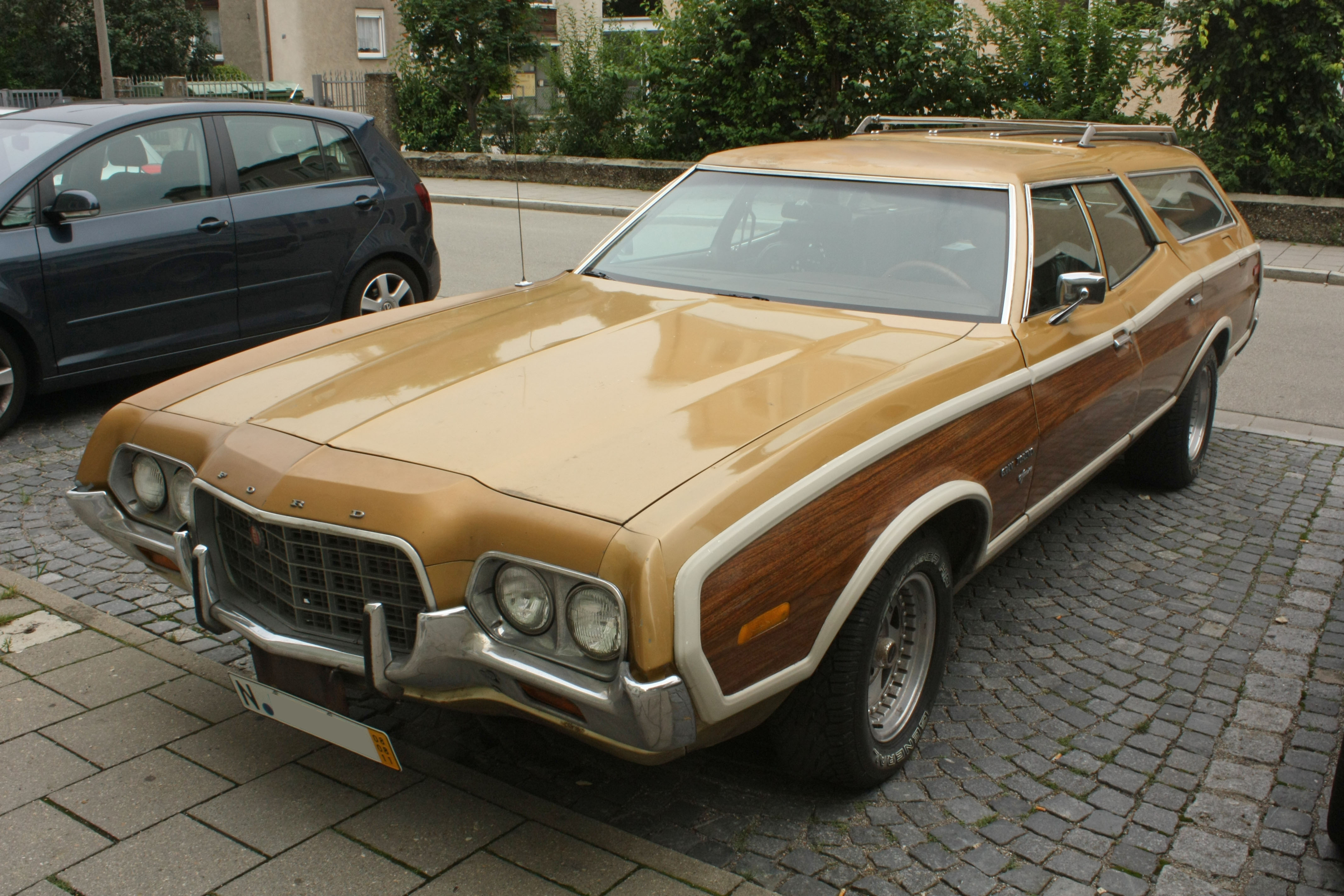
1972 Ford Gran Torino Squire Station wagon, with aftermarket wheels

Torino wagons grew much larger in 1972. Length increased by 2 in (51 mm) for Torino models, and 6 in (152 mm) for Gran Torinos. Wheelbase was up by 4 in (102 mm), width increased by 3 in (76 mm), and weight increased significantly. The extra width allowed Torino station wagons to carry a 4×8' sheet of plywood flat in the cargo area with the tailgate down. Station wagons had a rated capacity of 83.5 cu ft (2,364 L), nearing the capacity of some full-size wagons. An available rear-facing third seat was available, increasing the wagon's capacity from 6 to 8 passengers. All station wagons used the 3-way "Magic Doorgate" featuring for the first time a tailgate that could be opened as a door with the rear window up. A heavy-duty frame was standard equipment for all wagons. The Squire models came standard with a luggage rack and simulated woodgrain panels that were slightly translucent, allowing some of the paint tint to show through.

Torino wagons were often used to tow, but all Torino models could be equipped with one of two optional towing packages. A medium-duty trailer package for Class II towing allowed towing up to 3,500 lb (1,600 kg). This package included heavy-duty suspension, the extra-cooling package, trailer towing identification sticker and wiring harness. This option group required the 351-2V or larger engine. A heavy-duty Class III package included heavy-duty suspension, heavy-duty frame (standard on wagons), extra cooling package, heavy-duty battery and alternator, along with a 3.25:1 axle and trailer wiring. This package allowed the Torino to tow up to 6,000 lb (2,700 kg) and required the 400-2V or larger engine and G78-14 or larger tires. Both towing packages listed an automatic transmission, power steering and brakes as mandatory options.

Overall, the 1972 Torino was a sales success and a total of 496,645 units were produced, making it the best-selling intermediate for 1972. This was the first time Ford had ever outsold the Chevrolet Chevelle since its 1964 introduction. The automotive press responded positively to the all new Torino, and it received generally positive reviews. In addition, Consumer Guide selected the Torino as a "Best Buy" for 1972.

The 1972 Ford Gran Torino Sport SportsRoof was featured in the 2008 movie Gran Torino, directed by and starring Clint Eastwood.

=== 1973 ===
1973 Ford Torino
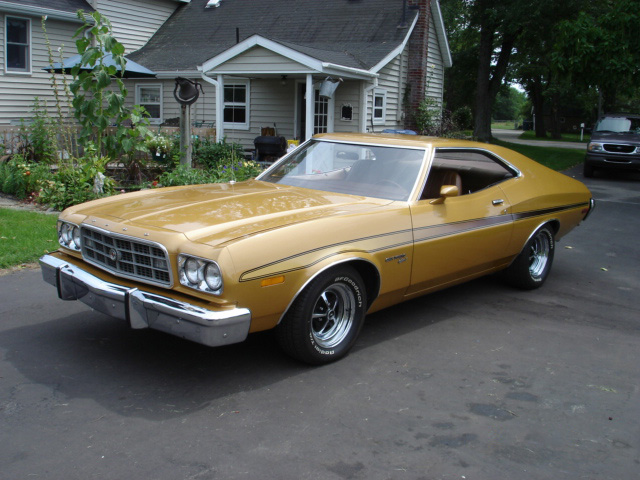
- 1973 Ford Gran Torino Sport 2-door SportsRoof

Body and chassis
- Body style: 2-door hardtop 2-door fastback 4-door sedan 4-door station wagon
- Chassis: body-on-frame
- Related: Ford Ranchero; Mercury Montego

Powertrain
- Engine: 250 cu in (4.1 L) Thriftpower I6; 302 cu in (4.9 L) Windsor V8; 351 cu in (5.8 L) Windsor V8; 351 cu in (5.8 L) Cleveland V8; 400 cu in (6.6 L) 335 series V8; 429 cu in (7.0 L) 385 series V8; 460 cu in (7.5 L) 385 series V8 (Police package only)
- Transmission: 3-speed manual 4-speed manual 3-speed automatic

Dimensions
- Wheelbase: 114.0 in (2,896 mm) (2-door); 118.0 in (2,997 mm) (4-door, wagons)
- Length: 208.0 in (5,283 mm) (2-door); 212.0 in (5,385 mm) (4-door); 215.6 in (5,476 mm) (wagons)
- Width: 79.3 in (2,014 mm); 79.0 in (2,007 mm) (wagon)
- Curb weight: 3,597–4,124 lb (1,632–1,871 kg)*; *Shipping weight

The most obvious change for the 1973 model was a new front fascia, required to meet new federal regulations. The new regulation mandated that all cars manufactured after September 1, 1972, must be able to take a 5 mph (8.0 km/h) strike to the front without damaging safety related components such as headlamps and the fuel system. For 1973 only, rear bumpers had a 2.5 mph (4.0 km/h) requirement. The Torino's front end featured totally new sheetmetal from the firewall forward, with a blunt, more squared-off fascia replacing the previous year's pointed prow. The new large square 5 mph (8.0 km/h) energy absorbing bumper replaced the almost body-fitting chrome bumper used on the front of the 1972 Torino. The new larger bumpers caused all Torino models to increase in length by at least 1 in (25 mm), and weight also increased by at least 100 lb (45 kg) for all models. Rear bumpers and taillights were unchanged from 1972.

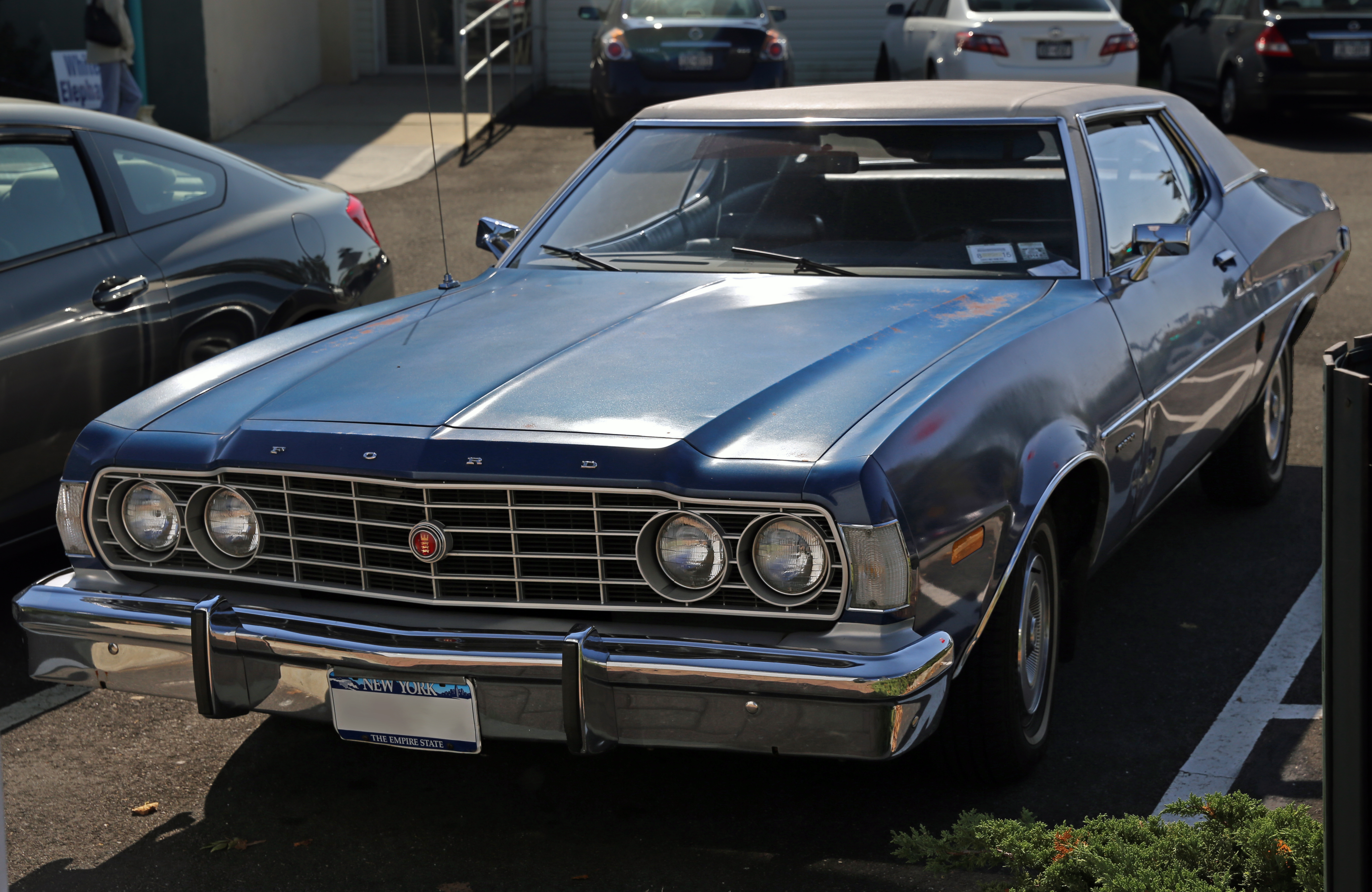
1973 Ford Torino 2-door hardtop base model

Separate grille designs were still maintained for Torino and Gran Torino models; they mimicked the 1972s in design. The Gran Torino now had a more rectangular grille with the parking lamps horizontally placed in the grille, but the quad headlights were still surrounded with a chrome bezel. Base Torino models had a wider full width grille that surrounded the headlamps; however, the parking lamps were located on the outer edge of the fascia. The leading edge of the hood was squared off to follow the fascia's lines, and all models shared the same hood. The 1973 Torino used the same rear bumper as the 1972 Torino, and incorporated minor changes to meet the 2.5 mph (4.0 km/h) mandate. Rear bumpers now had new brackets that increased the space between the bumper and the sheetmetal, an impact strip and bumper guards.

The model line-up for 1973 increased to 11 from the 9 models in 1972. The model line-up consisted of "Torino", "Gran Torino", "Gran Torino Sport", and "Gran Torino Brougham." The "Gran Torino Brougham" was available as a 2-door hardtop and a 4-door sedan. Other models were offered in the same body styles as 1972. Bench seats for 1973 reverted to low backs with separate head rests to increase rear visibility. The high back bucket seats were still available on the two-door models. The hood release was moved to inside for increased security. Two-door and four-door models used larger 10-inch (254 mm) x 2.5-inch (64 mm) rear drum brakes for 1973 to help cope with the extra weight; 1972 models used 10 in (254 mm) x 2-inch (51 mm) drums. Radial tires were added to the option list which offered longer tread life and better road manners.

The standard engine remained the 250 CID inline-six for all models except the station wagons and Sport, which used the 302-2V. Engine options also remained the same, but all engines now had their compression ratio dropped to 8.0:1. Power for all engines was slightly lower than in 1972. The 351 CJ continued to be the only high-performance engine and only saw a 2 hp (1.5 kW) drop from 1972. Police package Torinos had the same engine options as the civilian models but with the addition of a high-performance 460-4V exclusive to the "Interceptor" package.

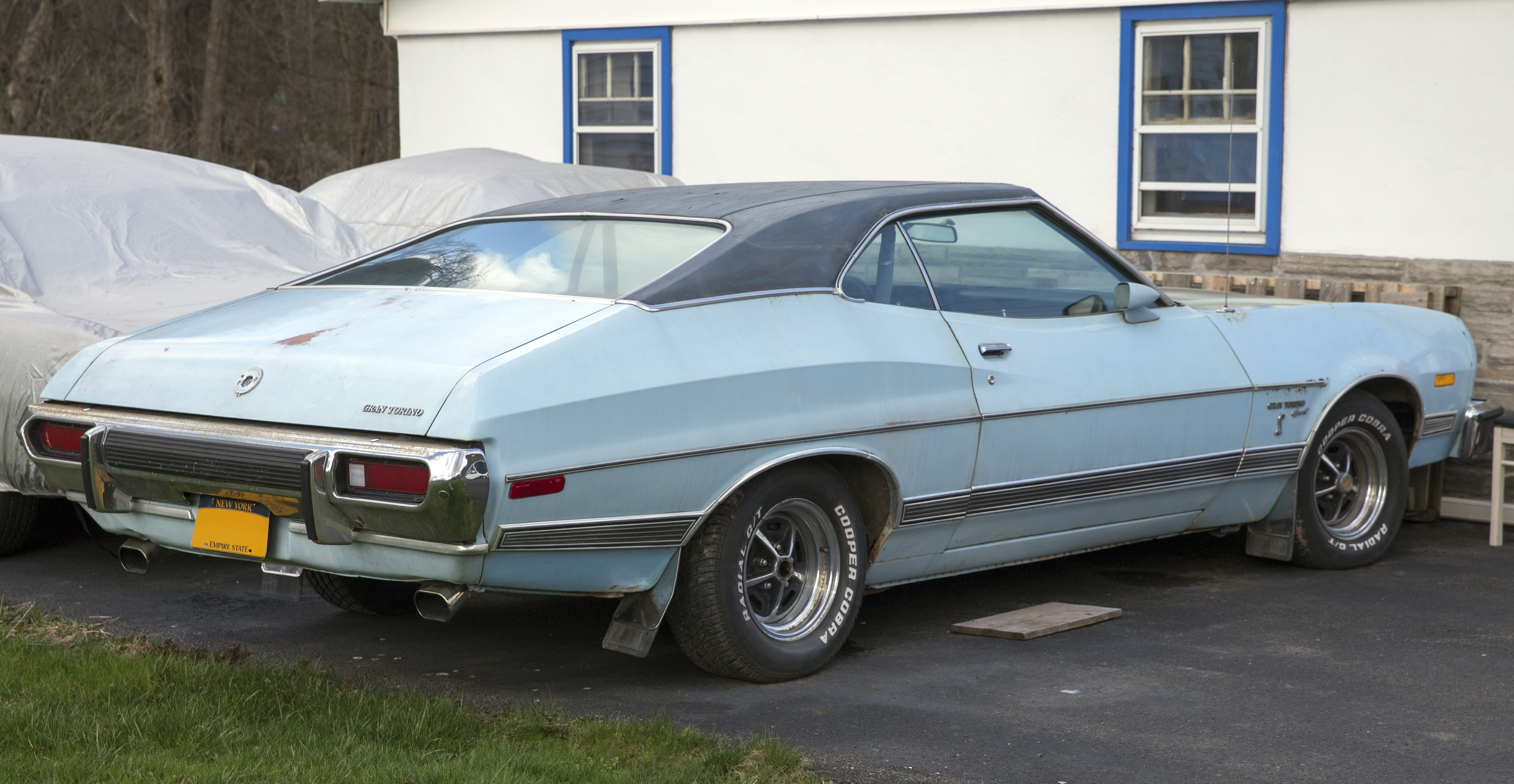
1973 Ford Gran Torino Sport

For 1973, Gran Torino Sport had its own unique emblem, which it displayed in the grille and on the trunk lock cover. The laser stripe was revised to a slightly different shape, and ran higher along on the body side. The Sport no longer had a hood scoop, and the Ram Air induction option was gone. The Sport was available as a 2-door SportsRoof or a 2-door hardtop but was otherwise unchanged from the 1972 model year. In the Car and Driver magazine road test of a 1973 Gran Torino Sport, the suspension was noted to be a good balance of comfort and handling. Car and Driver wrote that the Torino was as "..quiet as a Jaguar, smooth as a Continental, the Torino's ride is exceptional ... even with the competition suspension." Their test of a SportsRoof equipped with the 351 CJ, C-6 automatic, and 3.25:1 gears, resulted in a 0 – 60 mph (97 km/h) time of 7.7 seconds while the quarter-mile went by in 16.0 seconds at 88.1 mph (141.8 km/h). The 0 – 60 mph time was 0.9 seconds slower than the 1972 model Car and Driver tested a year before; however, this can partially be attributed to differences in gear ratio, transmission type, and an almost 350 lb (160 kg) increase in weight. The 1973 Sport had a test weight of 4,308 lb (1,954 kg), while the 1972 had a test weight of 3,966 lb (1,799 kg). For comparison, in a Motor Trend test of a 1970 Torino 2-door equipped with a 351-4V, Cruise-O-Matic, and 3.00:1 gears, they recorded a 0 – 60 mph (97 km/h) time of 8.7 seconds, and a quarter-mile time of 16.5 seconds at 86 mph (138 km/h). However, the high compression 1970 motor required premium fuel, while the low compression 1973 motor could run on regular.

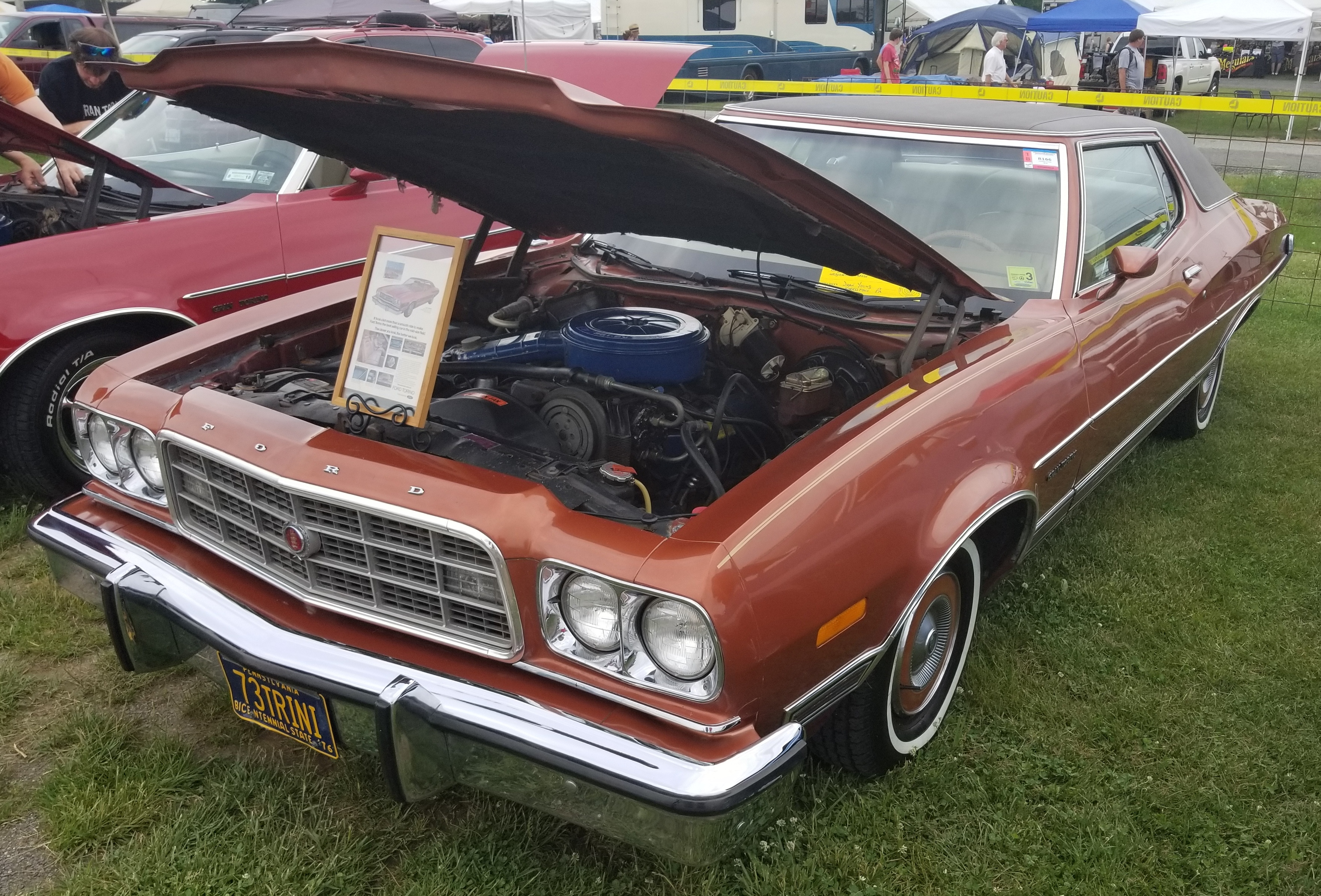
1973 Ford Gran Torino 2-door hardtop with Luxury Decor Package

The Gran Torino Brougham featured the most premium upholsteries in the Torino line-up, including nylon cloth fabrics and "leather like" vinyl. Standard equipment included a front bench seat with a fold down armrest, woodgrained trim on the instrument panel, deluxe steering wheel, electric clock, bright pedal pad trim, and a dual note horn. The Squire wagon was trimmed similarly to the Brougham. Along the same genre, Ford introduced spring special option group called the Luxury Décor Package, in March 1973. This option package was available on 2-door Gran Torino models and included a white, brown, or green halo vinyl roof with colour-keyed body-side molding pinstripe package, colour keyed rear bumper pad and wheel covers, black sidewall radial tires, flight bench seat in tan super soft vinyl with matching door panels, deluxe 2-spoke steering wheel, wood tone instrument panel applique, dual note horn, 25-oz cut-pile carpet, and upgraded insulation. The Luxury Décor Package was only available with three exterior colours, saddle bronze, medium copper metallic or metallic ivy glow.

1973 was a successful year for the Torino, with 496,581 units being sold. The sales continued to be strong, even with the stiff competition from GM's new for 1973 "Colonnade" intermediates. Torino was the number one selling intermediate and outsold its main competitor, the Chevrolet Chevelle, by over 168,000 units.

=== 1974 ===
1974 Ford Torino
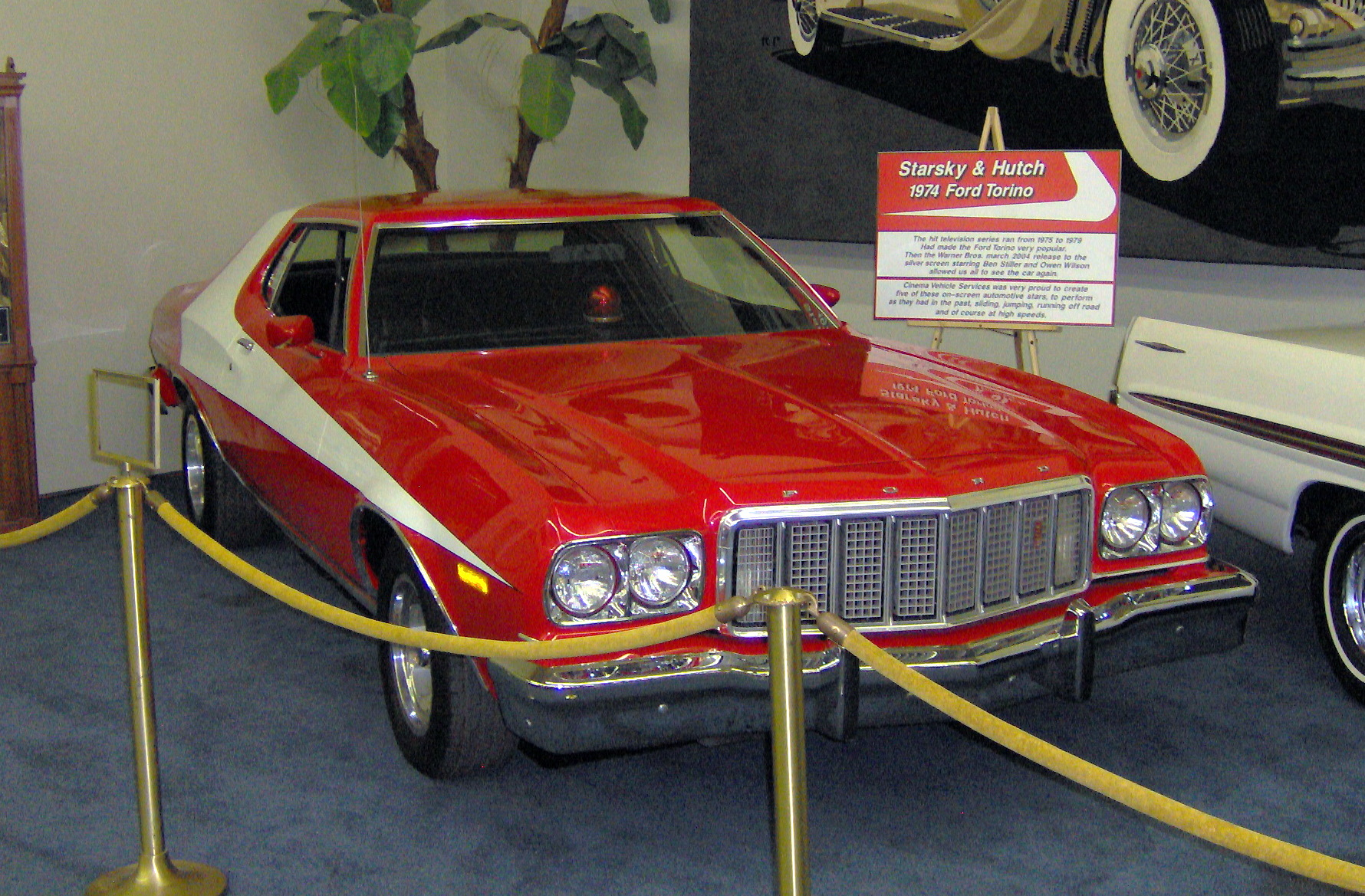
- 1974 Ford Gran Torino from the 2004 Starsky & Hutch film

Body and chassis
- Body style: 2-door coupe 4-door sedan 4-door station wagon
- Chassis: body-on-frame
- Related: Ford Ranchero; Ford Elite; Mercury Montego; Mercury Cougar

Powertrain
- Engine: 302 cu in (4.9 L) Windsor V8; 351 cu in (5.8 L) Windsor V8; 351 cu in (5.8 L) Cleveland V8; 400 cu in (6.6 L) 335 series V8; 460 cu in (7.5 L) 385 Series V8
- Transmission: 3-speed manual 4-speed manual 3-speed automatic

Dimensions
- Wheelbase: 114.0 in (2,896 mm) (2-door); 118.0 in (2,997 mm) (4-door, wagons)
- Length: 211.4 in (5,370 mm) (2-door); 215.4 in (5,471 mm) (4-door); 222.0 in (5,639 mm) (wagons)
- Width: 79.3 in (2,014 mm); 79.0 in (2,007 mm) (wagon)
- Curb weight: 3,509–4,250 lb (1,592–1,928 kg)*; *Shipping weight

The 1974 model year saw more extensive revisions to the Torino line. Government safety regulations now required that the rear bumpers must also meet the 5 mph (8.0 km/h) standard, so all Torinos had the rear bumper and tail lamp panel redesigned. The new rear bumpers were much larger, square shaped, and sat lower on the body. No longer was there a valance panel located below the bumper as on the 1972–73 models. The tail lights were beveled rectangular wraparound units which eliminated the need for rear side marker lights. The fuel filler was repositioned above the bumper, hidden behind an access door in the center of the taillight panel. The front fascia for Gran Torinos was revised for 1974. The new grille was of similar shape to the 1973, but was slightly larger and divided into 8 equal sized vertical rectangular sections. The grille had a fine mesh pattern with vertical parking lamps in the outer sections (embossed with the grille pattern on the surface of the lens) and the grille emblem was changed The front bumper was revised to be slightly more pointed while the bumper guards moved more towards the center of the bumper compared to 1973 models. The license plate bracket was relocated to the driver's side of the bumper. Base Torino models carried on with the same front fascia as 1973; however, its front bumpers were revised similarly to the Gran Torinos except the license plate remained in the center. Gran Torino Broughams had a red reflector panel between the taillamps to give them a full-width look. Broughams and Squires had a stand-up hood ornament in place of the emblem on the grille.

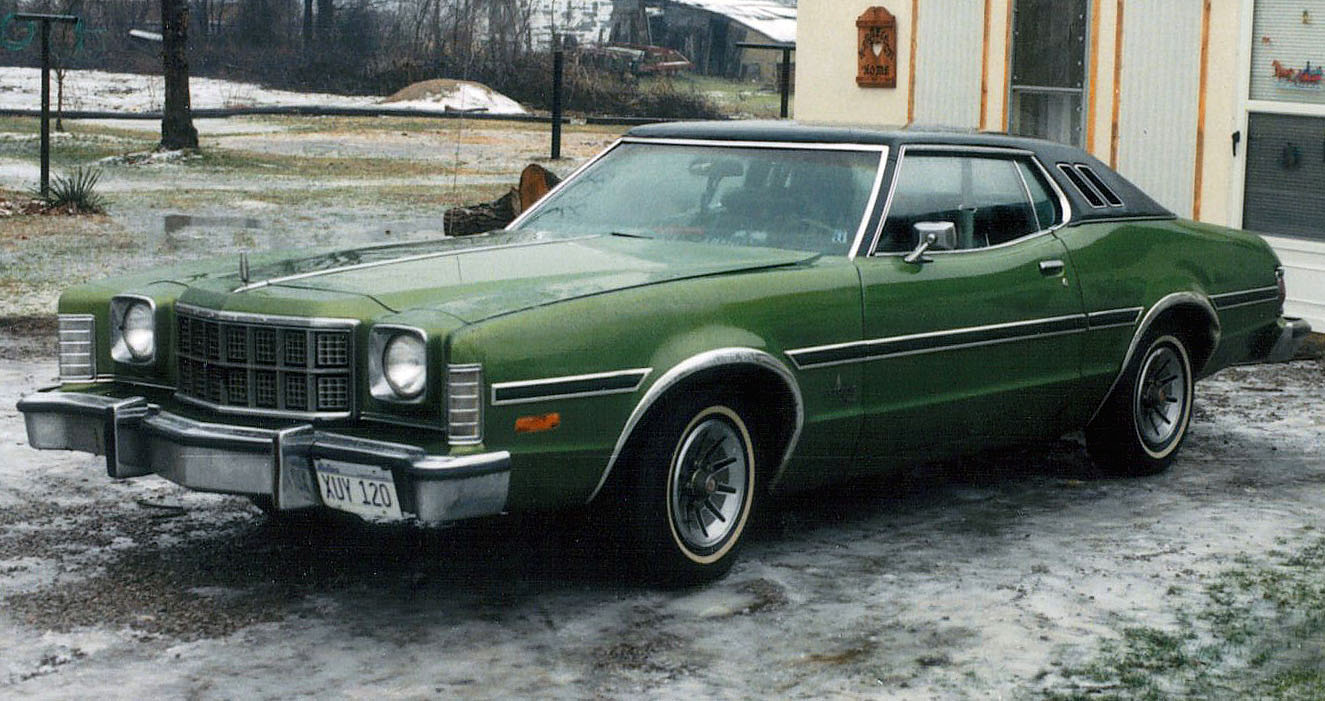
1974 Ford Gran Torino Elite

The Torino model line-up was the same as 1973, with two exceptions. The Gran Torino Sport was no longer available with the "SportsRoof" fastback roofline, and the new "Gran Torino Elite" debuted. Although 2-door Torinos were advertised as hardtops, the rear windows were revised to be fixed unlike the 1972–73 models. Ford announced to its dealers in January 1974 that new Gran Torino Elite, Ford's entry in the mid-sized luxury car market, would be available for sale as of the week of February 18, 1974. The Elite was Ford's response to Chevrolet's popular low-priced luxury coupe the Monte Carlo. The Elite was described by Ford as "A totally new 2-door hardtop ... with Thunderbird-inspired styling, solid engineering and personal luxury ... plus mid-size economy." The Elite wasn't totally new, as Ford described, but it did have a number of unique features. The Elite used the Mercury Montego and Mercury Cougar body shell with unique front end styling that resembled the Thunderbird. It had a large eggcrate mesh grille surrounded by single headlamps recessed in chrome bezels and vertical wraparound parking lamps. On the rear there were large wraparound taillamps with a reflective center panel giving it a full-width taillight appearance. Large color-keyed vinyl moldings were placed higher on the body side, similar to the Thunderbird. Standard equipment for the Elite included a 351-2V V8 engine, automatic transmission, and radial tires. It also featured standard luxury items such as a vinyl roof with twin opera windows, split bench seat, "Westminster" cloth upholstery, woodgrain trim, and complete instrumentation.

For 1974, Torino added several new luxury oriented options and features including a leather-wrapped steering wheel, split bench seat, an electric sunroof, rear fender skirts, speed control with steering wheel controls and opera windows for 2-doors. Opera windows were added as standard equipment on Brougham models. The exterior trim was revised, with moldings the rocker panels instead of the lower doors. Brougham and Sport models had an extra chrome molding that ran on the lower fender edge between the front wheelwell and bumper; this gave the appearance of bumper-to-bumper chrome. Squires had no lower body moldings. All 1974 Torinos used the seat belt-interlock system, as mandated by the U.S. government. This short-lived safety system would be removed after the 1974 model year. The competition suspension was no longer offered, and the only suspension option was a revised heavy-duty suspension package. This option was available on all Torinos except the Elite, and included a larger front sway bar and heavy-duty front and rear springs. Heavy-duty shocks and a rear sway bar were included in this package on 2-door and 4-door sedan models only.

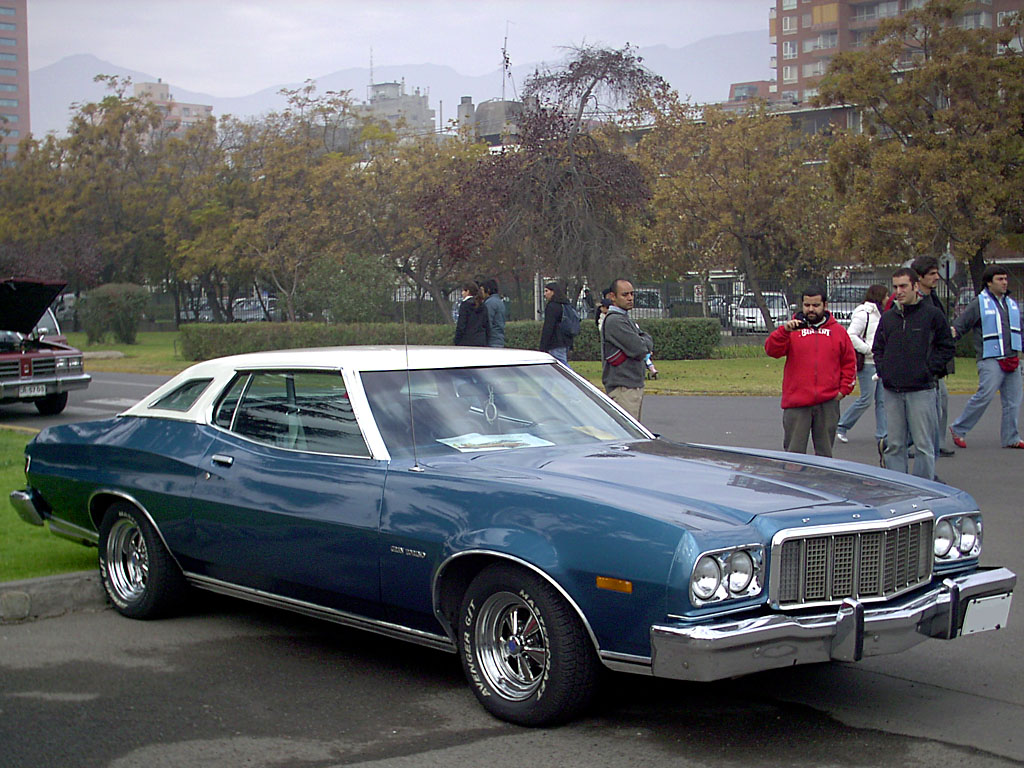
1974 Ford Gran Torino Brougham (with aftermarket wheels)

Torinos were now even larger and heavier than ever before. All body styles were approximately 5" longer due in part to the safety bumpers. With Torinos gaining weight and inches, the 250 CID I-6 was no longer the base engine. Nevertheless, even though original sales literature does not list the six cylinder engine as being available, Chilton's and Motor's repair manuals list availability and data for 6-cylinder powered Torinos. That said, it appears that a small number of base model Torinos were built with the 250 CID 6-cylinder engine; in fact one of the 6-cylinder Torinos became the main car for the 2004 movie Starsky & Hutch. The 429-4V was replaced with the 460-4V which produced more power and torque and was equipped with dual exhaust. All other engines saw a slight increase in power levels compared to 1973. Other than the few six cylinder exceptions, all Torinos and Gran Torinos came with the 302-2V as the base engine, and the 3-speed manual remained the standard transmission. The larger V8 engine options required the Cruise-O-Matic as a mandatory option, except the 351-CJ. The 351-CJ remained the only performance engine, and it was limited to 2-door models. It produced more power than the 460-4V, and saw a 9 hp (6.7 kW) increase but a loss of 22 ft⋅lbf (30 N⋅m) of torque. It was the only engine available with the 4-speed transmission but the more common Cruise-O-Matic was also available. This was the last model year for the 351 CJ and the four-speed transmission.

With the SportsRoof bodystyle discontinued, the Gran Torino Sport model was difficult to distinguish from other Gran Torino 2-doors. The Gran Torino Sport's main identifiers were its unique emblems, with placement on the grille, the C-pillar, and the fuel filler door. In addition, a "Sport" script was placed by the C-pillar emblem. To further remove it from the sporty theme, Gran Torino Sports even had opera windows (on vinyl-roofed cars) and fender skirts added to its option list. Of note, when opera windows were ordered, the "Sport" script was placed below the "Gran Torino" nameplate on the fender and the C-pillar emblem was deleted. The laser stripe was no longer available, but a lower body multi-coloured non-reflective stripe was an option. Higher profile 78 series radial ply tires replaced the previously used 70 series bias-plys.

The interior of the Gran Torino Sport had more distinction from other models. The instrument package became a standard feature, but bucket seats remained an option. Bucket seats were revised to a low back design with separate head rests. Sport door panels, now vinyl rather than molded plastic, and seats were highlighted with coloured stripes, similar to the 1973 Luxury Décor Package interior. As a cost-cutting measure, the "Magnum 500" wheel was revised with the formerly chrome plated wheel replaced by a polished trim ring and argent painted spokes. Overall, performance was more lackluster for 1974 models. The 1974 Sport had a shipping weight almost 400 lb (180 kg) heavier than a 1972 Sport.

Torino had another successful year in 1974, and continued to be popular. Ford produced 426,086 units, including 96,604 Gran Torino Elites.

=== 1975 ===
1975 Ford Torino
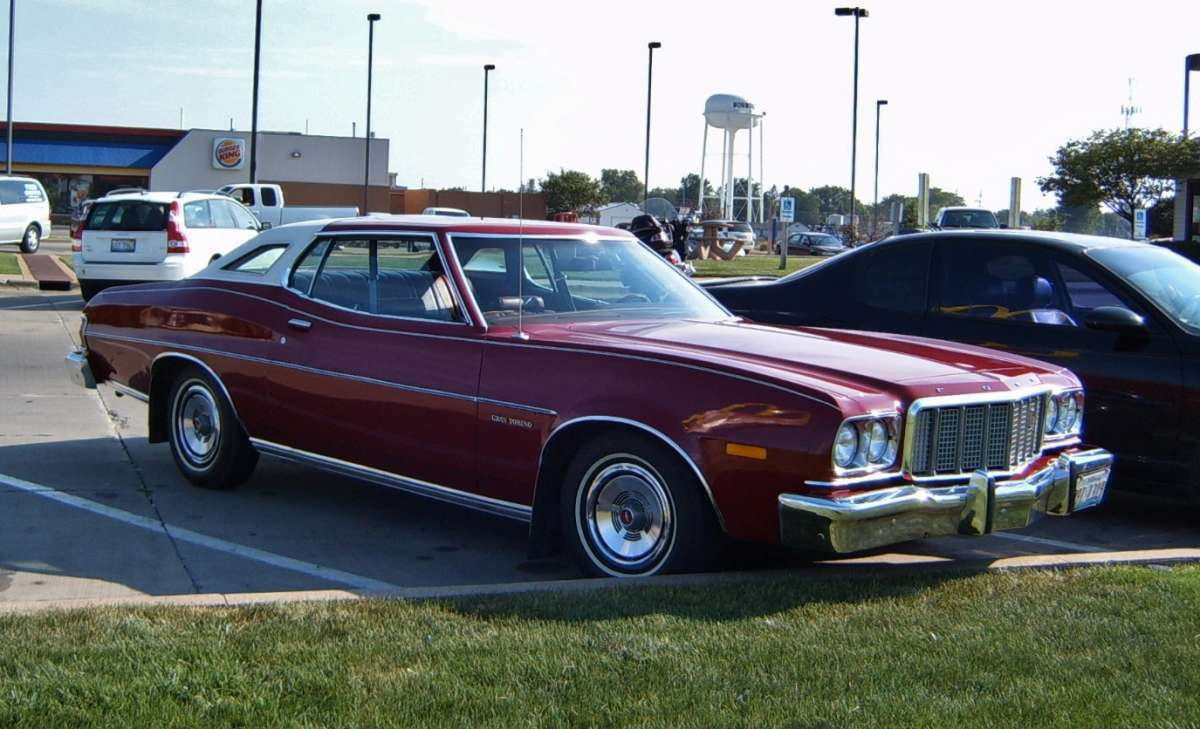

Body and chassis
- Body style: 2-door coupe 4-door sedan 4-door station wagon
- Chassis: body-on-frame
- Related: Ford Elite; Ford Ranchero; Mercury Montego; Mercury Cougar

Powertrain
- Engine: 351 cu in (5.8 L) Windsor V8; 351 cu in (5.8 L) 351M V8; 400 cu in (6.6 L) 335 series V8; 460 cu in (7.5 L) 385 Series V8
- Transmission: 3-speed automatic

Dimensions
- Wheelbase: 114.0 in (2,896 mm) (2-door); 118.0 in (2,997 mm) (4-door, wagons)
- Length: 213.6 in (5,425 mm) (2-door); 217.6 in (5,527 mm) (4-door); 222.6 in (5,654 mm) (wagons)
- Width: 79.3 in (2,014 mm); 79.0 in (2,007 mm) (wagon)
- Curb weight: 3,987–4,456 lb (1,808–2,021 kg)*; *Shipping weight

For the 1975 model year, the Ford Torino received a number of minor improvements, but was for the most part unchanged. The model line-up received only one change, the Gran Torino Elite was dropped. The Elite became an independent model, and marketed simply as the Ford Elite. All Torinos featured solid state ignition systems for 1975, which improved starting performance and fuel economy, while reducing maintenance costs. Radial tires, another fuel saving feature, power steering and power brakes were all new standard features for all Torinos. 1975 Torinos received a new steering wheel design and a "Fuel Sentry" vacuum gauge was added to the option list.

The 1975 model year saw virtually no changes to the exterior styling. The only significant change was that Torino models adopted the Gran Torino grille and front fascia. Torino's weight continued to climb even though the exterior dimensions were unchanged from 1974.

The Federal Clean Air Act prompted Ford to install catalytic converters for 1975 to help meet the new emission standards. Installation of the converter increased exhaust back pressure resulting in significantly reduced the power output. In response, Ford revised the base engine on all Torinos to the 351-2V engine. Along with this change, the Cruise-O-Matic transmission became standard; no manual transmissions were available. Power for all engines, except the 460, was significantly reduced compared to 1974, and along with the weight increase, fuel economy and performance continued to decrease. The 400-2V and the 460-4V were the only engine options, as the 351-4V was no longer available.

The new 351M joined the line-up to replace the 351 Cleveland. Although, when a Torino was equipped with a 351-2V engine it could result in the car being delivered either the 351M or the 351W, as they were used interchangeably. The 351M and 351W had no appreciable power output difference. Due to the lack of emissions certification, the 351M was not available in California. The 351M used the 400's tall deck block and shared its connecting rods and intake manifold, resulting in more parts shared between 351M and 400 compared to the 351C and 400. This saved Ford on the engine production costs.

The Gran Torino Sport remained but was virtually unchanged from the 1974 model. The Sport was almost indistinguishable from a conventional Gran Torino, and customers responded with a lack of interest. 1975 was the least popular and last year for this model; only 5,126 units were produced.

Sales for the Torinos dropped off significantly from the 1974 model year. With the Elite now a separate model, Torino lost a large portion of its sales. Ford produced only 195,110 Torinos for 1975. Even with the addition of the 123,372 Elites produced for 1975, total output was 318,482 which was still significantly lower than 1974. Sales decreases were likely due to the increased demand for smaller economical cars, while Ford's more sensibly sized Granada likely also stole sales from Torino. The Ford Granada was classed as a compact by Ford, but had exterior dimensions close to that of a late 1960s Ford Torino.

=== 1976 ===
1976 Ford Torino
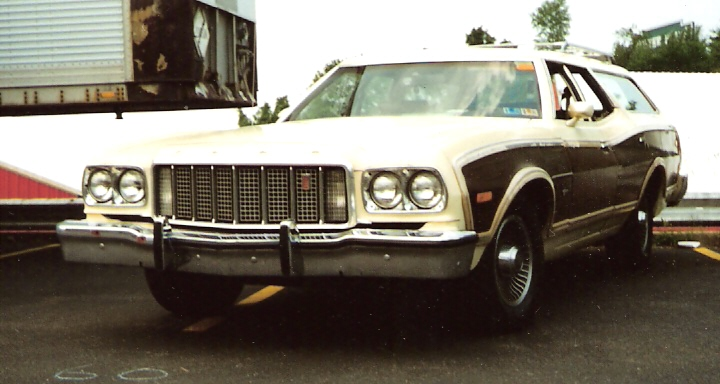
- 1976 Ford Gran Torino Squire

Body and chassis
- Body style: 2-door coupe 4-door sedan 4-door station wagon
- Chassis: body-on-frame
- Related: Ford Elite; Ford Ranchero; Mercury Montego; Mercury Cougar

Powertrain
- Engine: 351 cu in (5.8 L) Windsor V8; 351 cu in (5.8 L) 351M V8; 400 cu in (6.6 L) 335 series V8; 460 cu in (7.5 L) 385 Series V8
- Transmission: 3-speed automatic

Dimensions
- Wheelbase: 114.0 in (2,896 mm) (2-door); 118.0 in (2,997 mm) (4-door, wagons)
- Length: 214.1 in (5,438 mm) (2-door); 217.6 in (5,527 mm) (4-door); 222.6 in (5,654 mm) (wagons)
- Width: 79.3 in (2,014 mm); 79.0 in (2,007 mm) (wagon)
- Curb weight: 3,976–4,454 lb (1,803–2,020 kg)*; *Shipping weight

The 1976 model year saw no major changes to the Torino. The Gran Torino Sport was discontinued, and so the Torino consisted of 9 separate models; 2- and 4-door versions of the Torino, Gran Torino, and Gran Torino Brougham, along with three station wagon models. New options for the 1976 model year included a power trunk release and an automatic parking brake release. Gran Torino 2-doors could be ordered with the center console when optional bucket seats were specified; previously the console was only available on Sport models. In addition, opera windows and landau roofs were now available options for all 2-door models. There were no styling changes made to Torino for 1976.

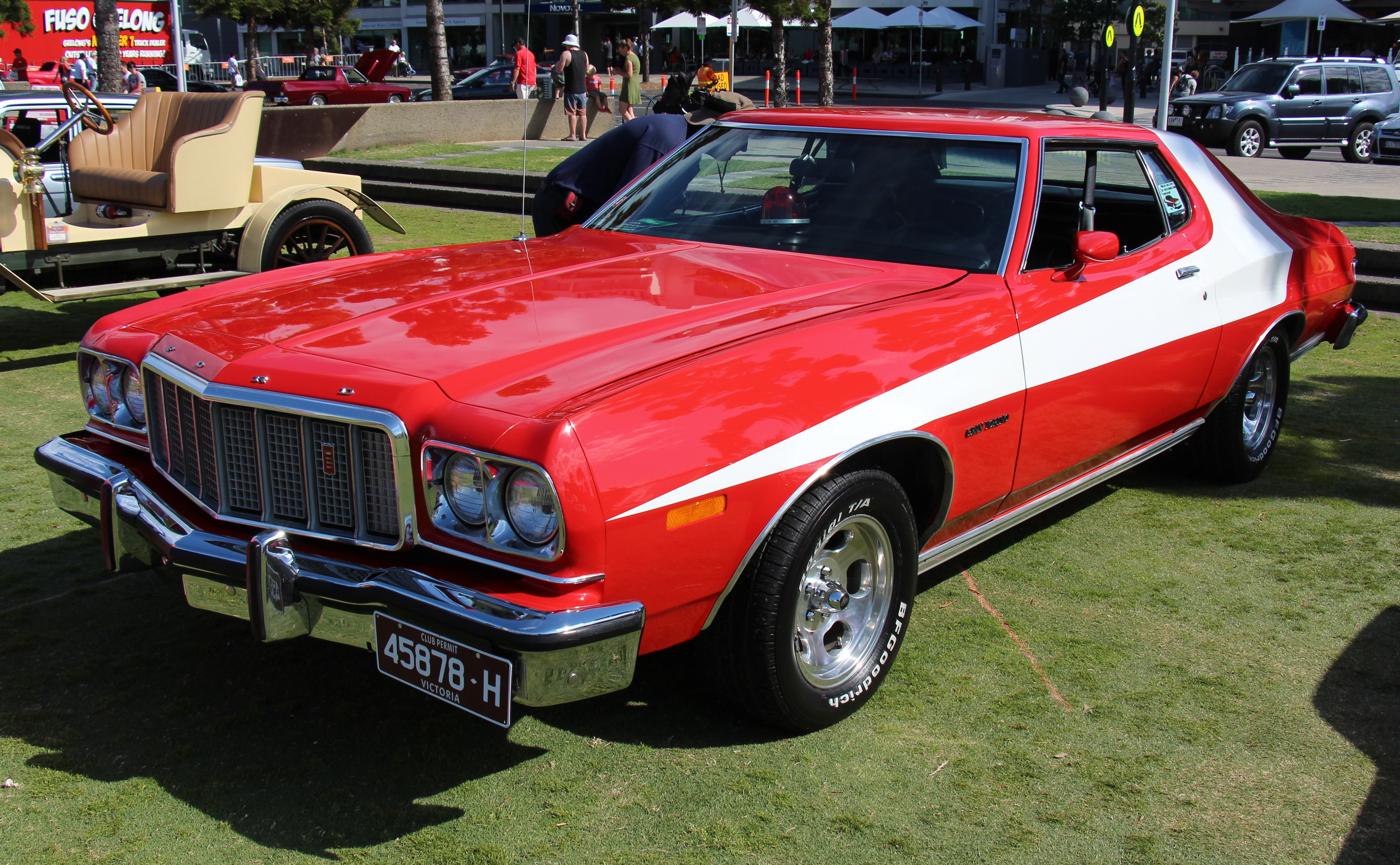
1976 Ford Gran Torino 2-door Starsky and Hutch replica

Engine options remained the unchanged for 1976, however fuel economy was improved on all engines with revisions to the engine spark advance and the EGR valve operation. The 351-2V engines and the 400-2V had a power and torque increase, and the 460-4V had a power decrease. In an attempt to help improve fuel economy, the standard rear axle ratio for all models was now 2.75:1.

1975–1976 Gran Torinos were used in the popular Spelling-Goldberg Productions TV series Starsky & Hutch. The producers needed a flashy specialty car for the main characters to drive. Since Ford was the lease supplier for on-screen cars through their Studio-TV Car Loan Program, eventually it was decided by the producers that a bright red 1975 Gran Torino two-door would be the vehicle of choice for the pilot episode. To make the Torino less mundane, a large white vector stripe was added. Aluminum 5-slot mag wheels and larger rear tires replaced the stock wheels and tires, and air shocks were added to give the car an aggressive rake. The television show became quite popular with the public, and much of that popularity was centered on the star Torino. Ford couldn't help but take notice to the public's interest in the "Starsky and Hutch" Torino, and decided to introduce a replica version of the TV car. Ford built 1,000 replicas of the "Starsky and Hutch" car in the spring of 1976. Production of the replicas began in March 1976, and all were produced in Ford's Chicago manufacturing plant. This limited production package was essentially a special paint option, but required the deluxe bumper group and dual color-keyed sport mirrors as mandatory options. The TV car's slotted mag wheels were not offered by Ford, and the only sporty wheel option was the Magnum 500 wheel. They were not a mandatory option though, and these cars came equipped with wheel covers as standard equipment. When producing the replicas, Ford painted the entire car white, then masked off the stripe and painted the rest of the car the shade of bright red (code 2B) used on the 1972–75 models (and subsequently the TV cars). This color had been discontinued for all other Torino models for 1976 in favor of a different shade of red. The factory replicas were close to the TV show car, but had minor differences in the stripe, and did not have the aggressive rake of the TV car. Many replica owners installed slotted mag wheels and air shocks after purchase to give the car a more authentic look. The "Starsky and Hutch" replica was available with all Torino engines. Seat colors were limited to black or white and were available with all seating trims and options. One of the factory replicas was leased to Spelling-Goldberg as a backup for the original Torinos that were created for the show.

Production total for the Torino in 1976 was 193,096 units, slightly lower than 1975. This would be the final year for the Ford Torino.

The Torino chassis continued to live on under the Ford LTD II, Ford Thunderbird, Ford Ranchero and Mercury Cougar through the 1977 to 1979 model years.

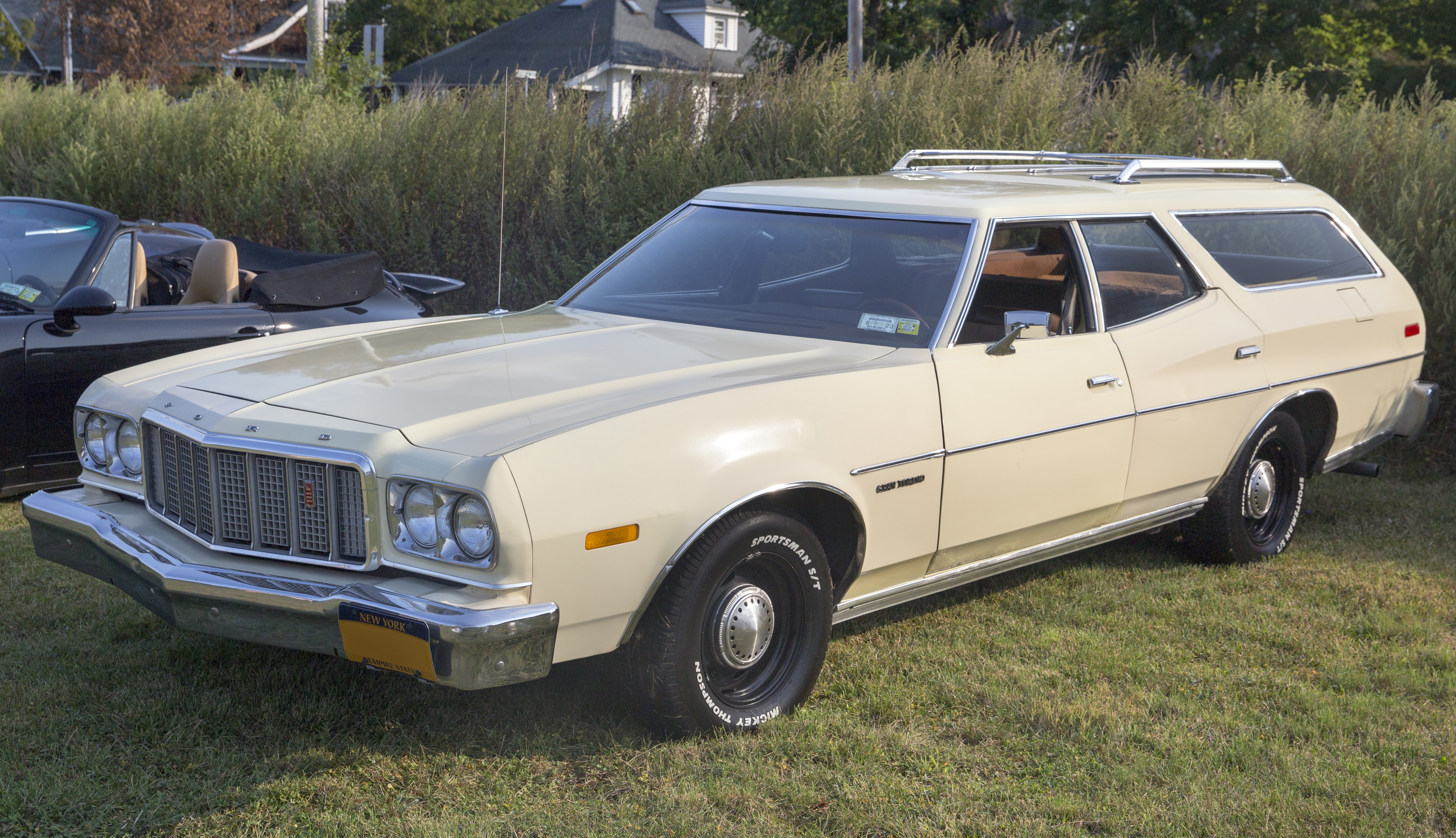
1976 Ford Gran Torino Station Wagon

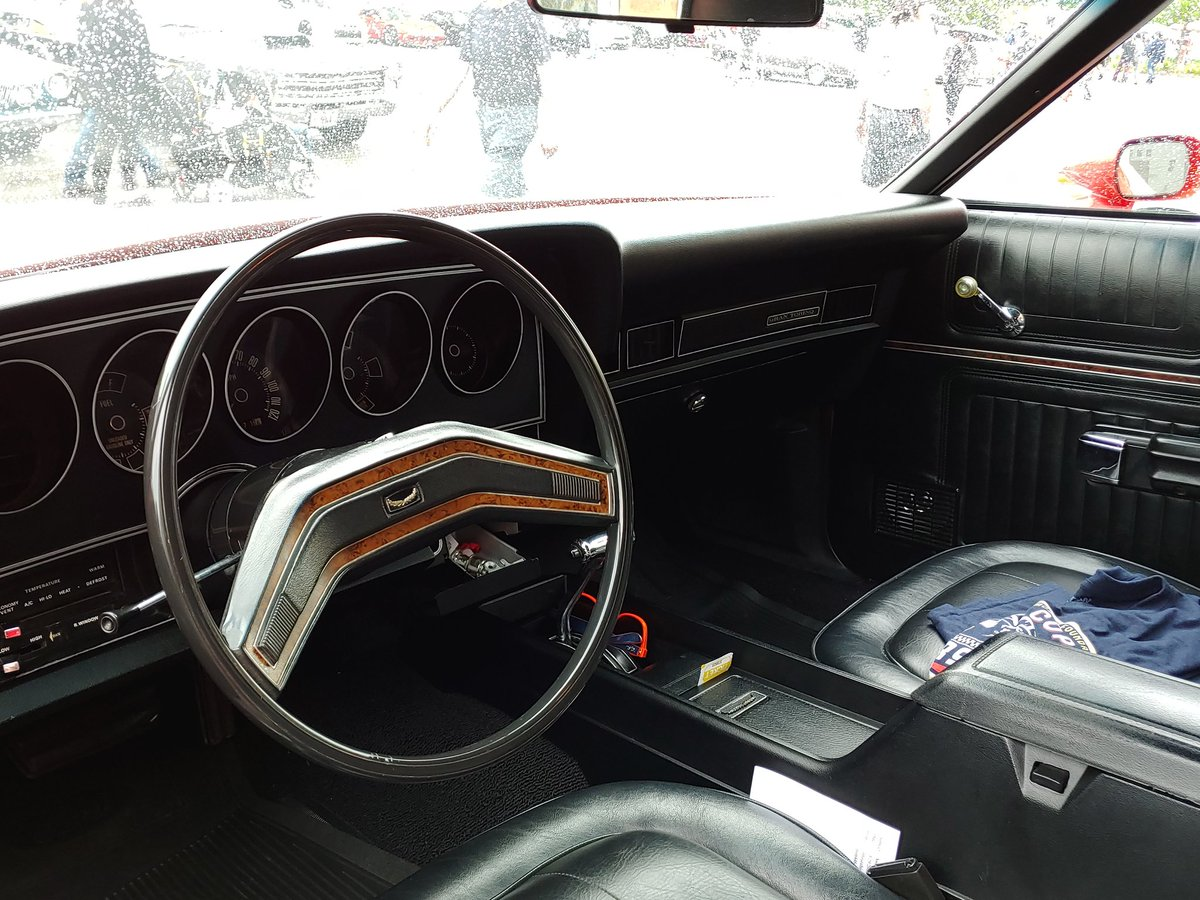
1976 Ford Torino interior

== Motorsport ==
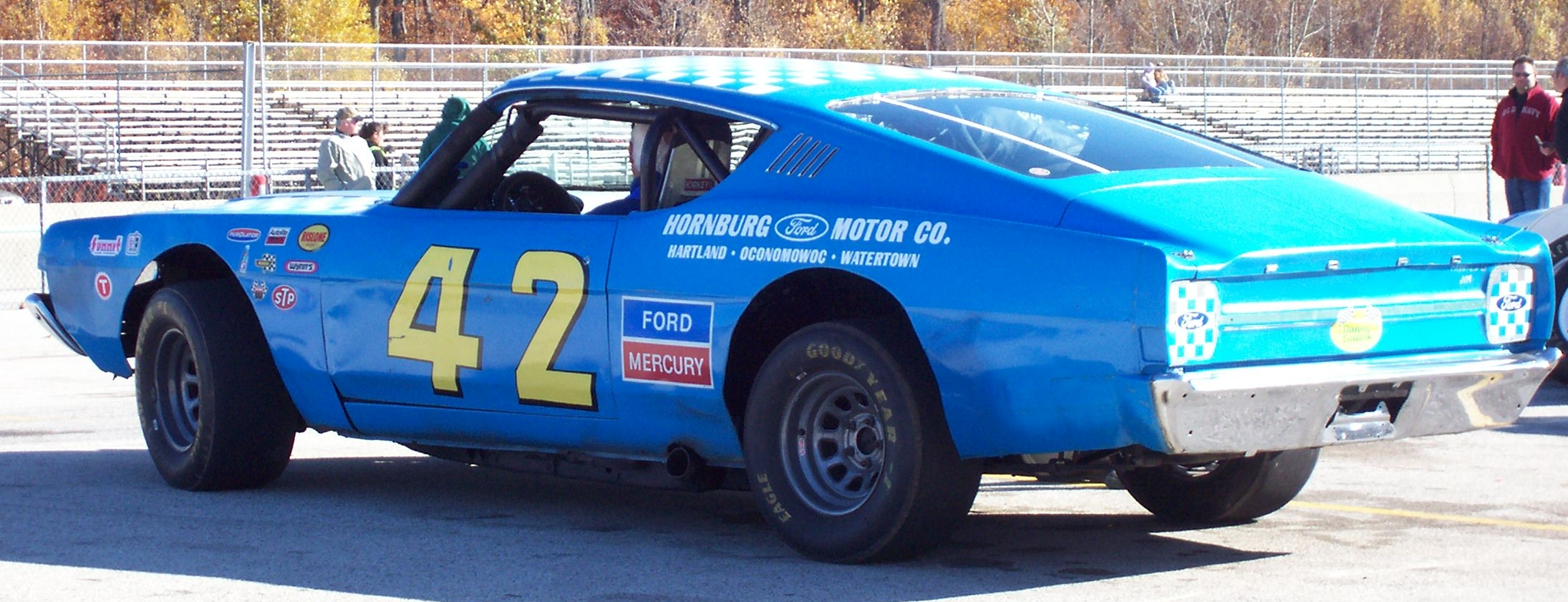
Dick Trickle's 1968 Torino Stock Car with the aerodynamic "Sportsroof" body

The fastback roofline of the 1968–69 Ford Torinos provided a wind-cheating design that dominated NASCAR superspeedway racing. In 1969 Dodge responded with the Dodge Charger 500. This car was built with specific modifications to improve the aerodynamics of the car on the NASCAR track. In turn Ford added a special high-performance vehicle to its intermediate line-up, the Torino Talladega. This limited edition car was made specifically with NASCAR racing in mind and all of its modifications were to improve the aerodynamics of the Torino.

=== Torino Talladega ===
The Torino Talladega was equipped with unique front fascia that extended the length of the car by approximately 5 inches (127 mm). This front-end extension allowed Ford engineers to taper the front-end to reduce drag. The grille, which was normally recessed was made to be flush fitting, and the smoother rear bumper was reworked to fit the front. The rocker panels were rolled, which allow NASCAR teams to lower their race Talladegas by 5 inches (127 mm) legally.

The Talladega came only in the SportsRoof body style and in three colours: Wimbledon White, Royal Maroon, and Presidential blue. All had a flat black hood and a unique beltline pin stripe. The Talladega came standard with a 428 CJ (non-Ram Air), C-6 Cruise-O-Matic, staggered rear shocks (normally reserved for 4-speed cars) and 3.25:1 open differential. Talladegas were equipped with a cloth and vinyl bench seat, and used the Fairlane 500 body code like the 1969 Cobra. These cars could not be ordered with additional options, and only 743 Talladegas were produced.

The Talladega further improved Ford's success rate on the NASCAR track. Dodge and Plymouth responded with the even more radical 1969 Dodge Charger Daytona and the 1970 Plymouth Superbird which used pointed nose cones and "goalpost" tail wings. Meanwhile, for those racing teams using Fords in 1970, some kept their 1969 Torinos when the new curvaceous 1970 models proved to be slower on the NASCAR track due to its less aerodynamic design.

=== Torino King Cobra ===
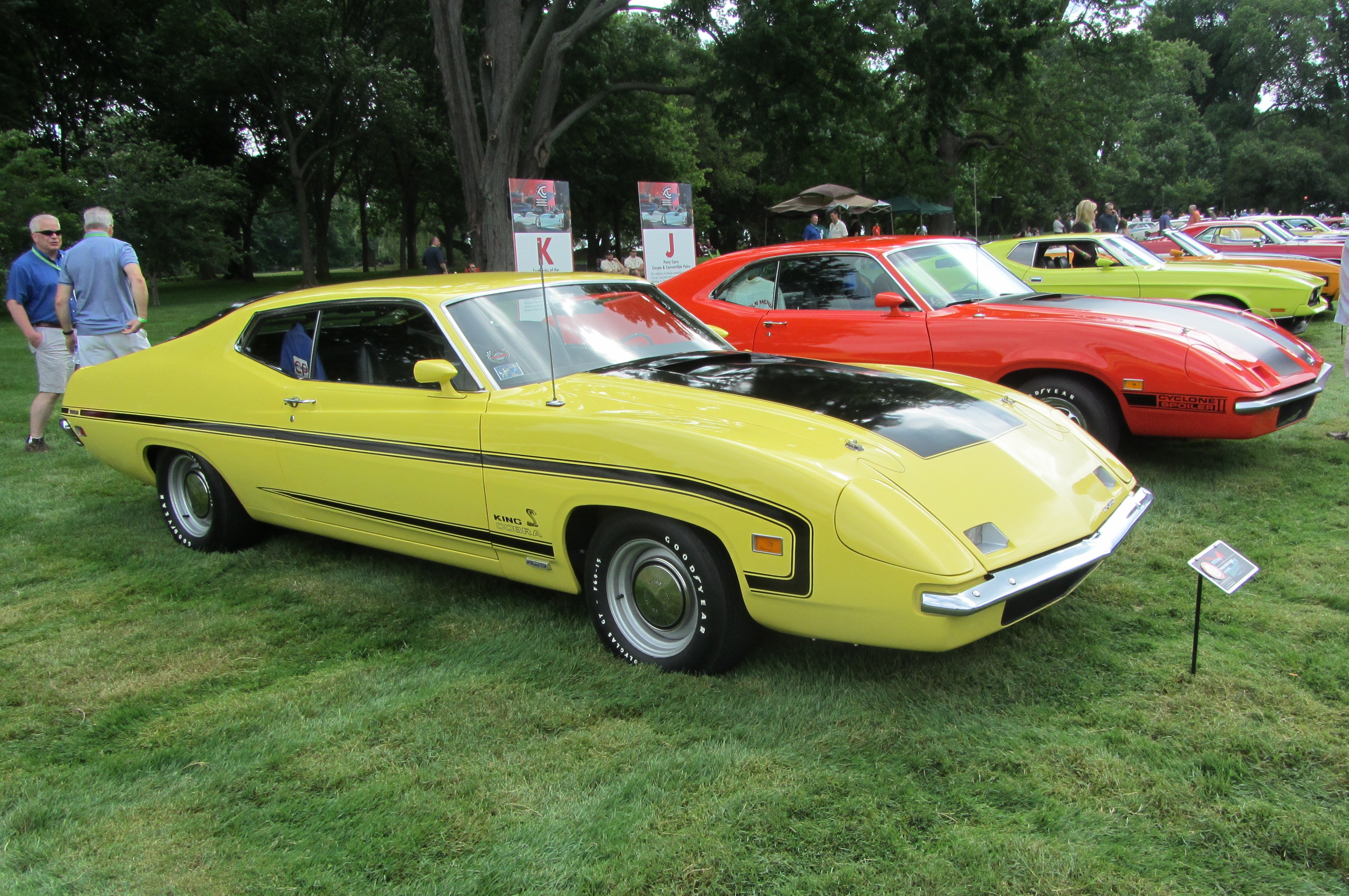
1970 Torino King Cobra

Ford planned to introduce another limited edition Torino to once again dominate at NASCAR. The result was the 1970 Ford Torino King Cobra. Like the Talladega, the King Cobra was modified with aerodynamics specifically in mind and looked very different from a typical 1970 Torino. It had a sloped front end with dual headlamps located in sugar scoop shaped cut-outs on the front fenders, similar in appearance to the Datsun 240Z. The King Cobra's grille was a large opening below the front bumper, much like the bottom breather design now used in some modern cars. Parking lamps were located between the headlamps, molded into the front fascia. The hoods had a blacked-out center portion, and a side stripe similar to 1968–69 Torino GTs ran from the front fender to quarter panel. Ford planned to offer covers for the headlight cutouts to NASCAR teams to improve aerodynamics even further. In actuality it is said the front end created too much down force. In addition to no rear down force creation this caused the car to become very loose in turns as per Musclecar Review.

Due to NASCAR changing the homologation rules which increased the minimum number of cars produced for the public from 500 to 3,000 for a vehicle to qualify at NASCAR, and new Ford president Lee Iacocca, the King Cobra project was abandoned by Ford. It never saw a NASCAR track or a showroom and only three prototype cars were produced. One was equipped with the Boss 429 engine, only offered otherwise in the Boss 429 Mustang, one had the 429 SCJ, and one had a 429 CJ. The Torino King Cobra with the Boss 429 has been listed on eBay as of May 3, 2014, with a "buy-it-now" price of $599,999 (~$780,833 in 2024).

== Venezuela ==
Ford built the Torino in Venezuela, but marketed it with the Fairlane name. The de luxe model was called Fairlane 500, and until 1974 it used the base Torino grille but Gran Torino trim on the body. Starting in 1974 this car was identical to the U.S. Gran Torino, and was available in coupe, sedan, and station wagon body styles.

== Collectibility ==
The 1970–71 Torino Cobras, the 1969 Torino Talladega, the 1970 King Cobra, the 1968–1971 Torino GT convertibles, and the 1969 Cobras are the most collectible Torino muscle cars. The 1972 body style has received notable exposure since the beginning of the 21st century with the release of the 2008 film Gran Torino (featuring a 1972 Gran Torino Sport and Clint Eastwood) and the 2009 film Fast & Furious. The 1974–76 body style was first popularized due to the 1970s television series Starsky and Hutch, and revived with the release of the 2004 film Starsky & Hutch. As a result, the value of the 1974–76 Torinos has risen; still they are not the most valuable of the Torino body styles. However, the limited-edition factory replica Torino will likely be a valuable investment due to the series having a longtime cult following.

The lack of popularity and the low numbers of Torinos in existence today is likely due to the Torino's durability issues that caused low survivability. Torinos had serious problems with chassis and body corrosion as well as having a less-than-perfect reliability record. In areas where severe winters exposed these cars to road salt, Torinos were reported to have major rust problems within the first 5 years of ownership. To further worsen the corrosion problems, 1969–1973 Torinos were reported to have severe paint-peeling problems. As a result, Torinos had the lowest resale value of any of the American intermediate cars in the 1970s used-car market.

== See also ==
- Ford Elite
- Ford Ranchero
- Mercury Comet
- Mercury Cougar
- Mercury Cyclone
- Mercury Montego
- Starsky & Hutch
- Gran Torino, a 2008 Clint Eastwood film
- Turin
