= Ford Fairlane Thunderbolt =

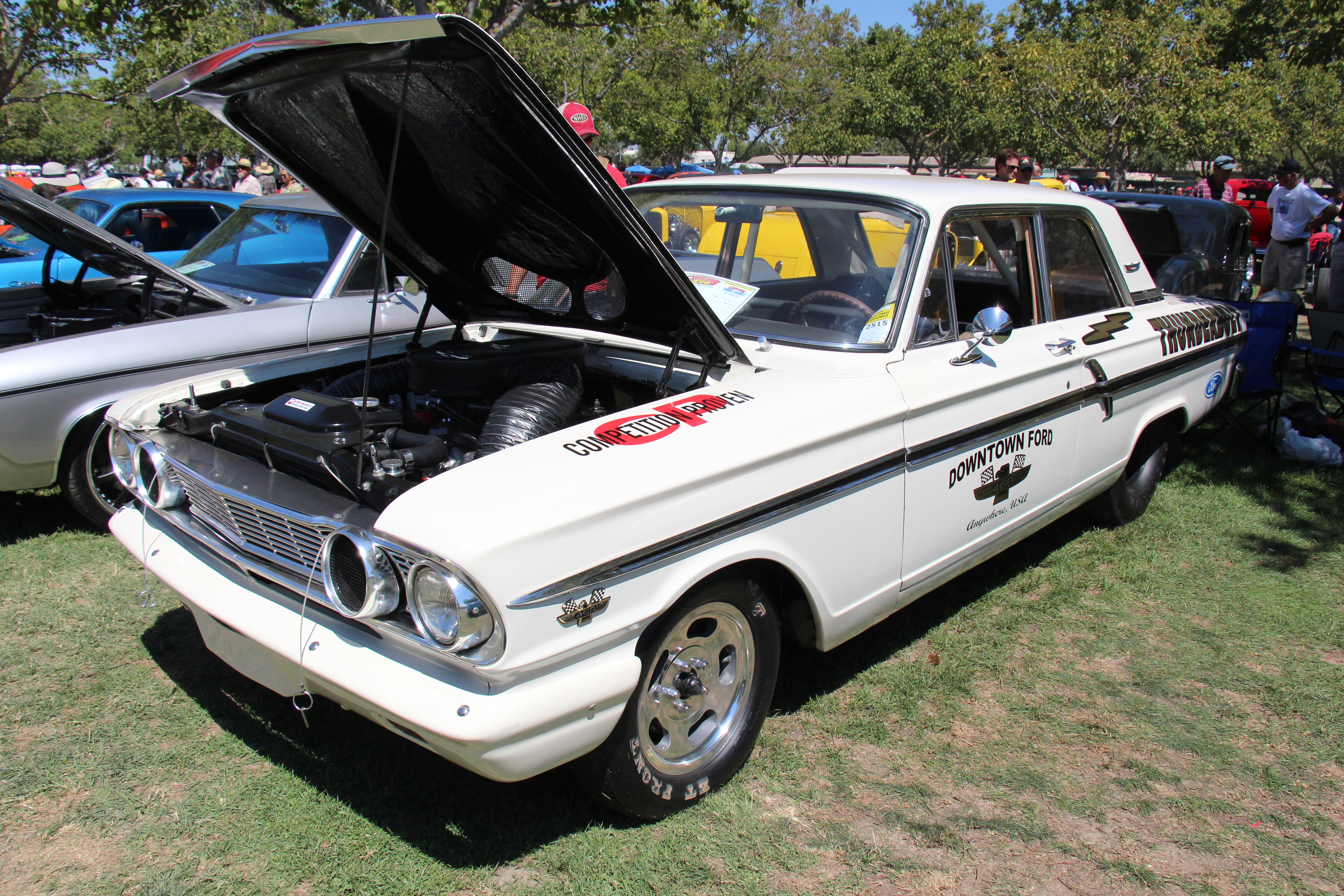
- Ford Fairlane Thunderbolt

Overview
- Manufacturer: Ford
- Model years: 1964
- Assembly: United States: Dearborn, MI

Body and chassis
- Class: Muscle car
- Body style: 2-door sedan
- Layout: FR layout
- Related: Mercury Cyclone

Powertrain
- Engine: 427 cu in (7.0 L) Ford FE V8
- Transmission: 3-speed MX Cruise-O-Matic; 4-speed manual

Dimensions
- Wheelbase: 115.5 in (2,930 mm)
- Length: 197.5 in (5,020 mm)
- Width: 72.5 in (1,840 mm)
- Curb weight: 3,203 lb (1,453 kg)

The Ford Fairlane Thunderbolt is a limited production, factory experimental, drag racing version of the Ford Fairlane produced during the 1964 model year only. A total of 100 units were produced; forty-nine 4-speeds and fifty-one automatics. A 4 speed secured the stick CLASS win at the US Nationals and secured the 1964 NHRA Super Stock championship for Ford.

== Overview ==
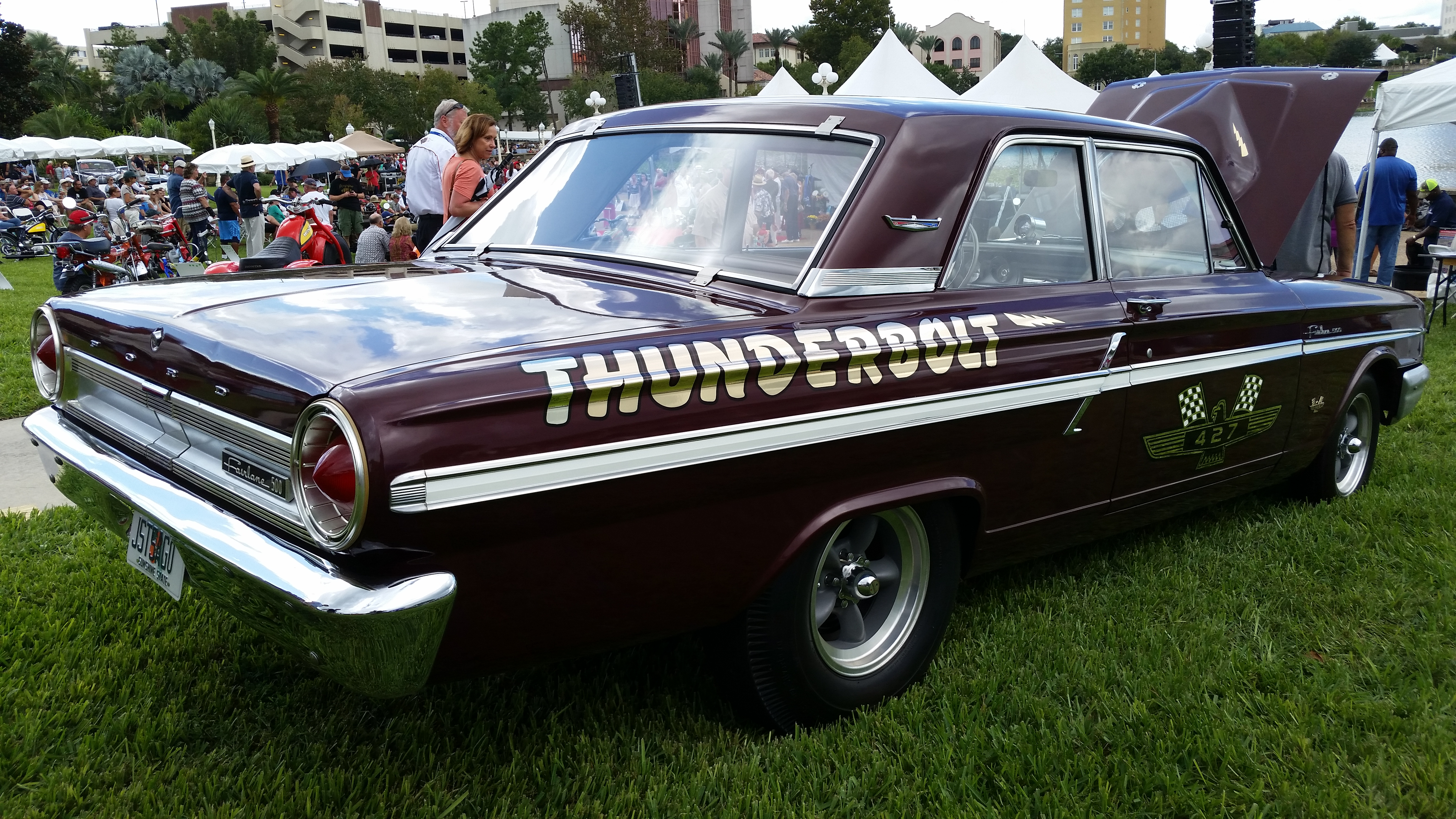
Ford Fairlane 500 Thunderbolt rear view

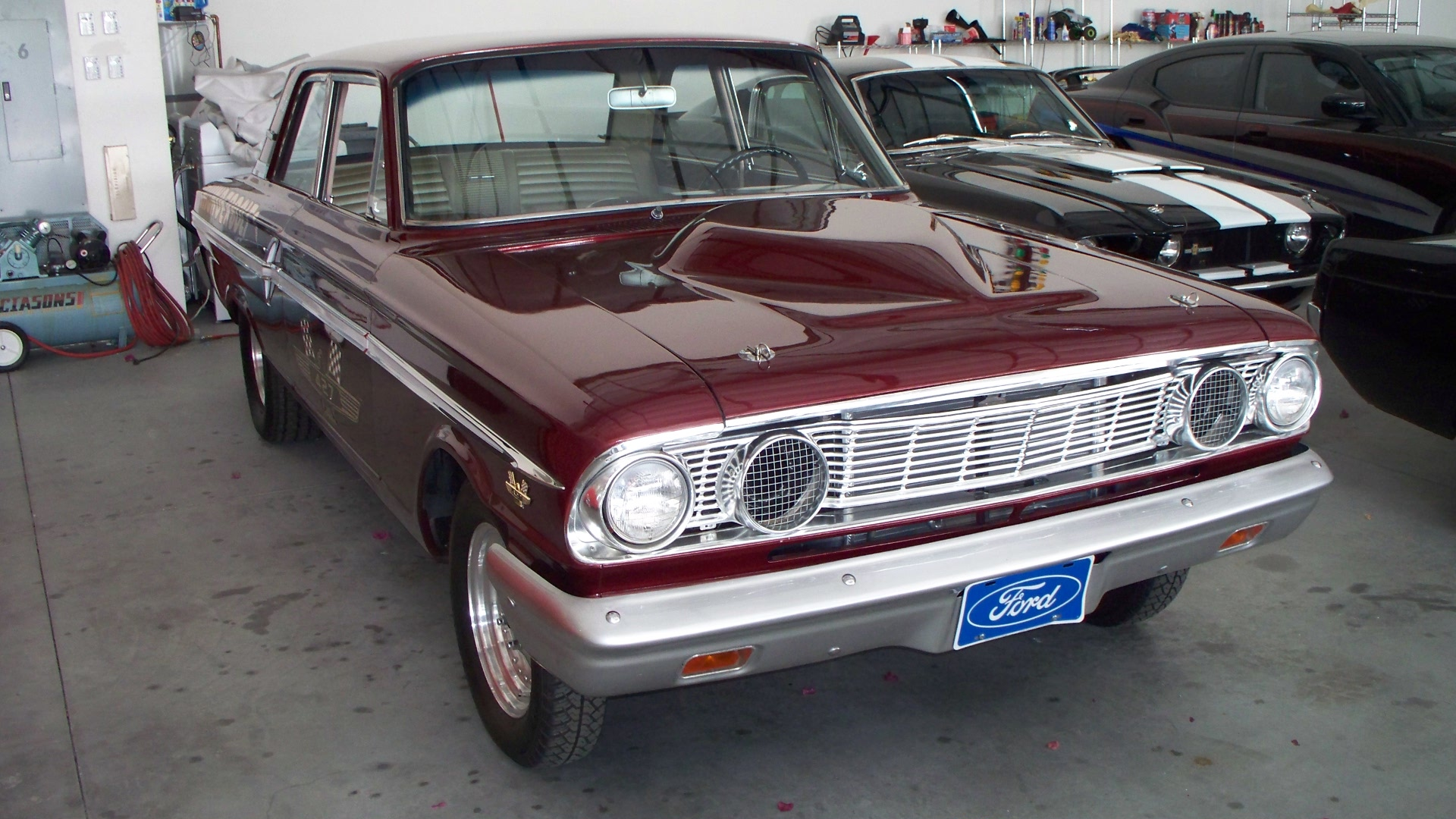
Modified, street-driven, 1964 Fairlane Thunderbolt

Based on the standard two door post sedan Fairlane and named for a factory experimental Fairlane of 1963, the Thunderbolt combined the light weight of Ford's intermediate-sized body introduced in 1962 with a "high rise" 427 cu in (7.0 L) V8 engine with dual 4-barrel Holley carburetors intended for use in the much larger Galaxie. That engine as used in the Galaxie for NASCAR racing did well, but the Galaxie was simply too heavy an automobile in stock trim to be drag raced successfully; so-called "lightweight" 427-powered Galaxies were built both for stock car racing as well as drag racing during the 1964 model year, although these cars were not modified to the extent of the Thunderbolt. As installed in the Thunderbolt, the engine was rated conservatively at 425 hp (431 PS; 317 kW) at 6,000 rpm and 480 lb⋅ft (651 N⋅m) at 3,700 rpm of torque; estimates using MPH/weight calculations placed the actual output at around 540 Flywheel hp . In standard form, the Fairlane is 12 in (305 mm) shorter than a Galaxie, rides on a 3.5 in (89 mm) shorter wheelbase and weighs approximately 700 lb (318 kg) less. Installing the Ford FE V8 in a vehicle intended for an engine no larger than a small block engine required major reworking and relocation of the car's front suspension components and the modification and strengthening of the suspension mounting areas. Fiberglass doors, hood, front fenders and even the front bumper on the earliest cars along with Plexiglas side and rear windows aided in weight reduction; the hood with its distinctive raised "teardrop" scoop designed to draw hot air from the engine compartment was pinned in position, eliminating the need for a hood hinges and a latch. Later cars have aluminum front bumpers in place of the fiberglass units due to racing regulations.

Racing equipment includes tubular exhaust headers, an electric fuel pump, altered rear suspension with heavy-duty traction control bars and asymmetrical leaf springs, trunk-mounted heavy duty battery, locking differential, auxiliary gauges, special drag race wheels and tires supplied both by Goodyear and Mickey Thompson (himself a recipient of one of the first ten cars) and an aluminum scatter shield designed to contain the clutch in case of disintegration under load. The claimed compression ratio was 13.5:1.

Other weight-saving measures include the elimination of such street items as the sunvisors, radio, heater, wheel covers, passenger-side windshield wiper, arm rests, rear window cranks, mirrors, sound deadening material, carpeting, trunk mat, lug wrench, jack and spare tire. The front seats are either lightweight units from Ford's police package vehicles or rudimentary bucket seats from the Econoline van; the carpeting was replaced with a black rubber mat. The rear seat is a standard Fairlane unit. The high-beam headlights were eliminated as well and replaced with mesh-covered ram-air intakes which run directly to a special air cleaner atop the 427. Like the street version, the Thunderbolt's outer high-low 5.75 in (146 mm) headlights of the type normally used with a four-lamp system are selectable with a standard foot-operated switch. Though it was technically a street-legal vehicle, these modifications and deletions along with a final drive ratio of 4:57.1 for the four-speed cars and 4:44.1 for the automatics make the Thunderbolt impractical for street use.

The Thunderbolt was not built on a regular Ford assembly line, but rather in conjunction with Andy Hotton of Dearborn Steel Tubing. It was there that partially built Fairlane bodies in top-of-the-line "500" exterior trim were combined with the 427 and either a heavy-duty Lincoln automatic transmission or a Borg-Warner four-speed manual transmission. The first eleven cars were painted in Ford's "vintage burgundy" while the remaining eighty-nine cars were painted "Wimbledon white." The engine code reflected not the 427 on most cars but rather the so-called solid lifter "K-code" 289 hi- performance engine. "427" emblems replaced the normal "260" or "289" emblems, and the "Fairlane 500" script on the upper front fenders was deleted.

Given the special nature of the car, Ford riveted a metal plate to the inside of the glovebox door of the Thunderbolt and other race-only models with a disclaimer relating to fit and finish. The plate reads:

This vehicle has been built specially as a lightweight competitive car and includes certain fiberglass and aluminium components. Because of the specialized purpose for which this car has been built and in order to achieve maximum weight reduction, normal quality standards of the Ford Motor Company in terms of exterior panel fit and surface appearance are not met on this vehicle.

This information is included on this vehicle to assure that all customers who purchase this car are aware of the deviation from the regular high appearance quality standards of the Ford Motor Company.

== Performance and motorsports ==
The Thunderbolt, as tested with a four-speed transmission at Lions Drag Strip in November 1963, ran a 1/4 mile (402 m) of 11.61 seconds at 124.8 mph (201 km/h).

Thunderbolts faced off in the final of the 1964 NHRA Winternationals, driven by Butch Leal and Gas Ronda; Ronda took the win, with a pass of 11.78 seconds at 123.40 mph (198.59 km/h). Ronda's Thunderbolt would go on to claim NHRA's national Top Stock crown that year.

== Media and merchandise ==
Miniatures of the Thunderbolt are currently manufactured by Hot Wheels and the Ertl Company.

Revell makes a 1/25 scale plastic model kit of this car. Later releases include a stock hood and factory small dish hub caps in addition to the mag wheels and teardrop hood that were included in original releases.

== Gallery ==
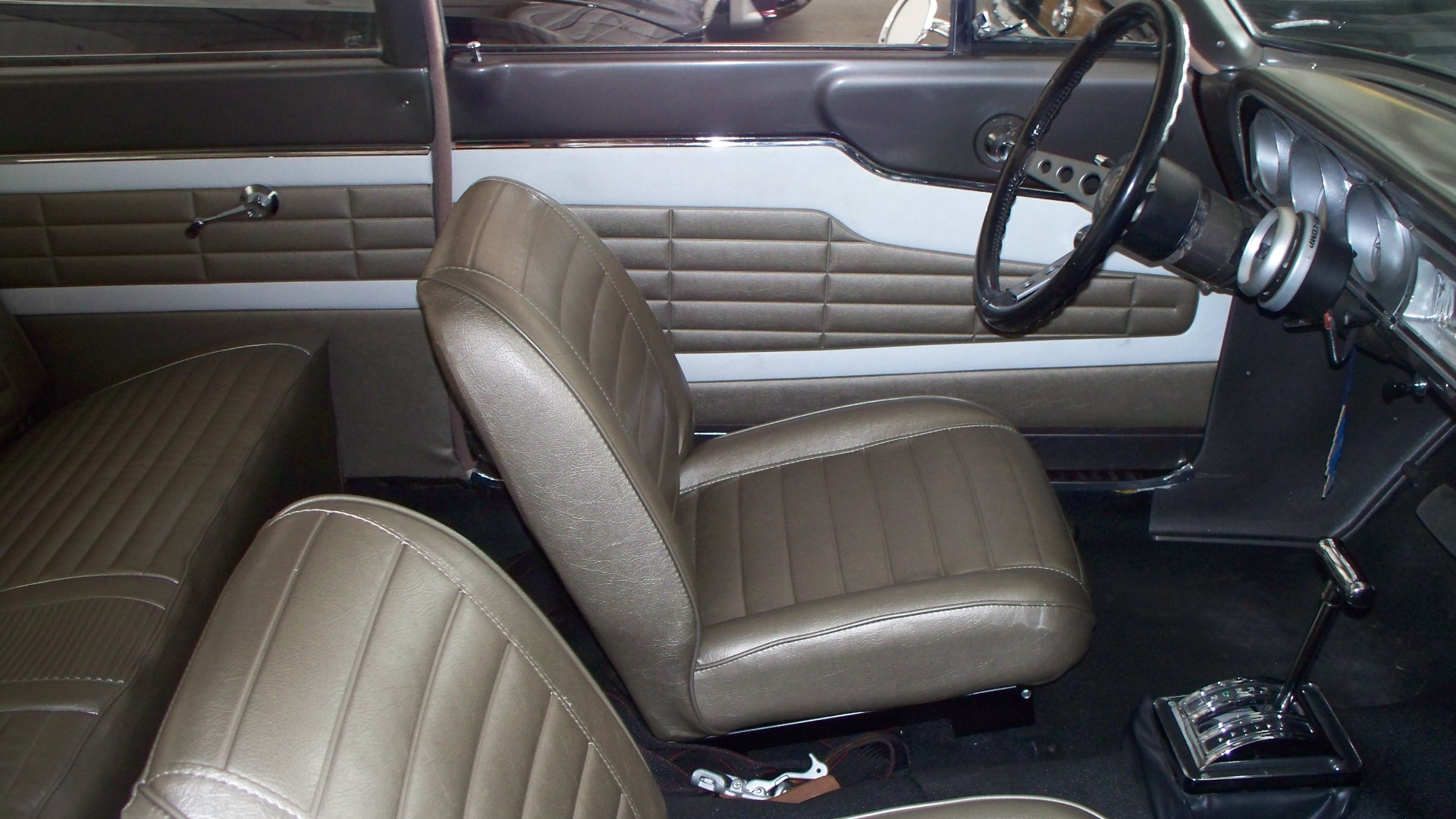
Interior of the car in the above photo with its Econoline bucket seats and later model Ford steering wheel and automatic transmission selector

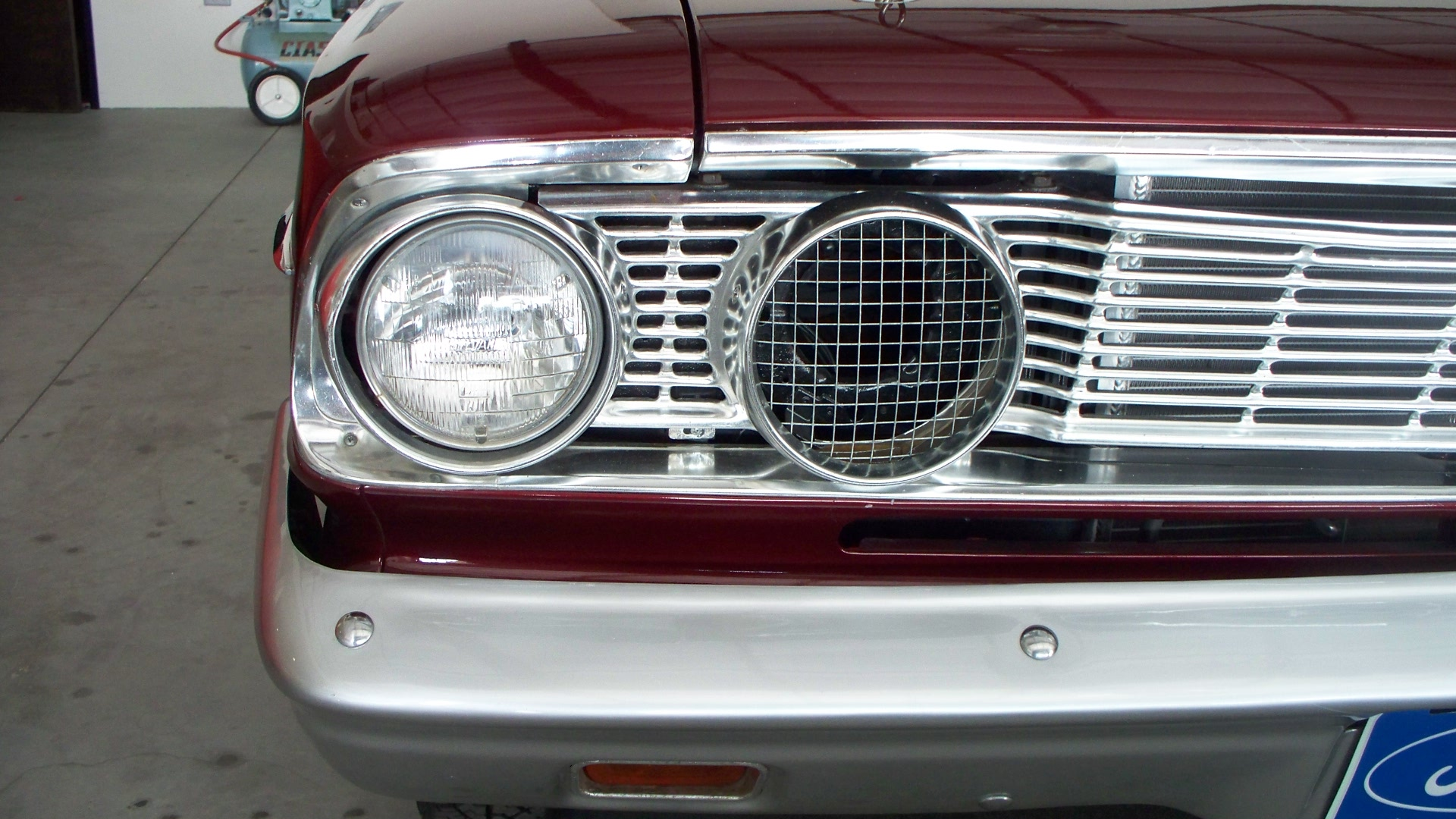
Detail of the ram-air intake setup and painted fiberglass bumper

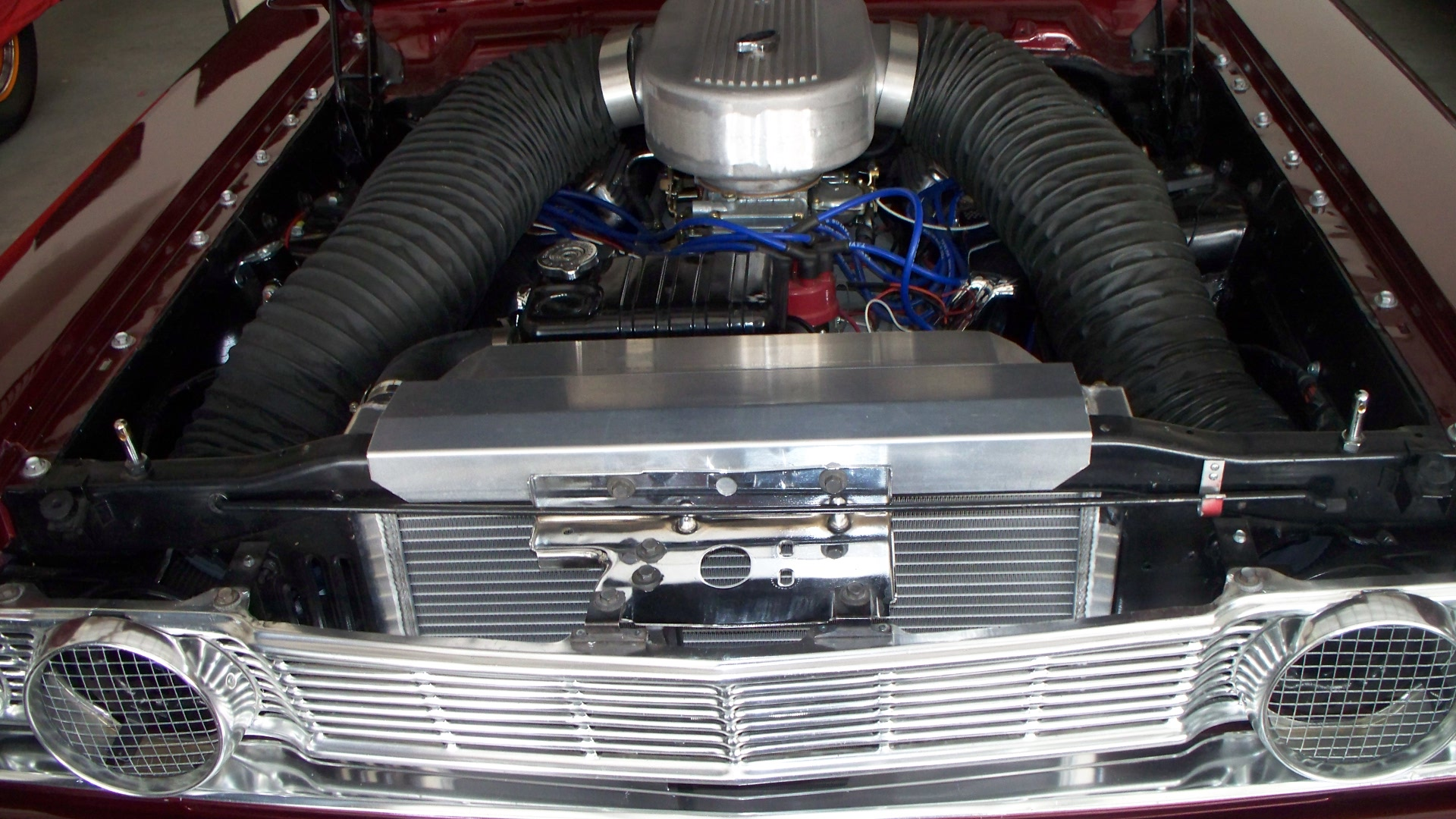
Underhood and outer air intake detail

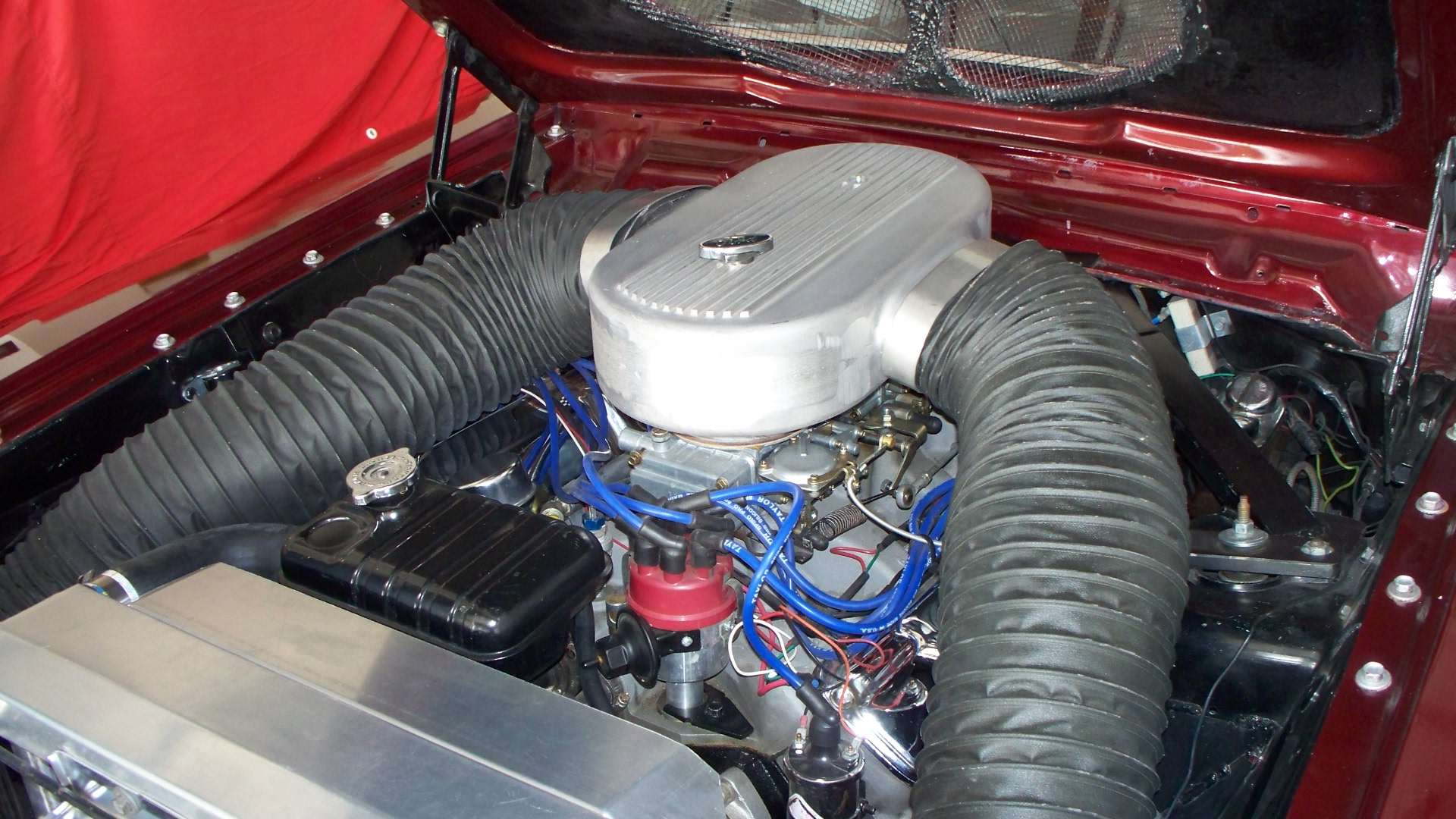
Engine detail featuring the 427's unique dual-snorkel air intake

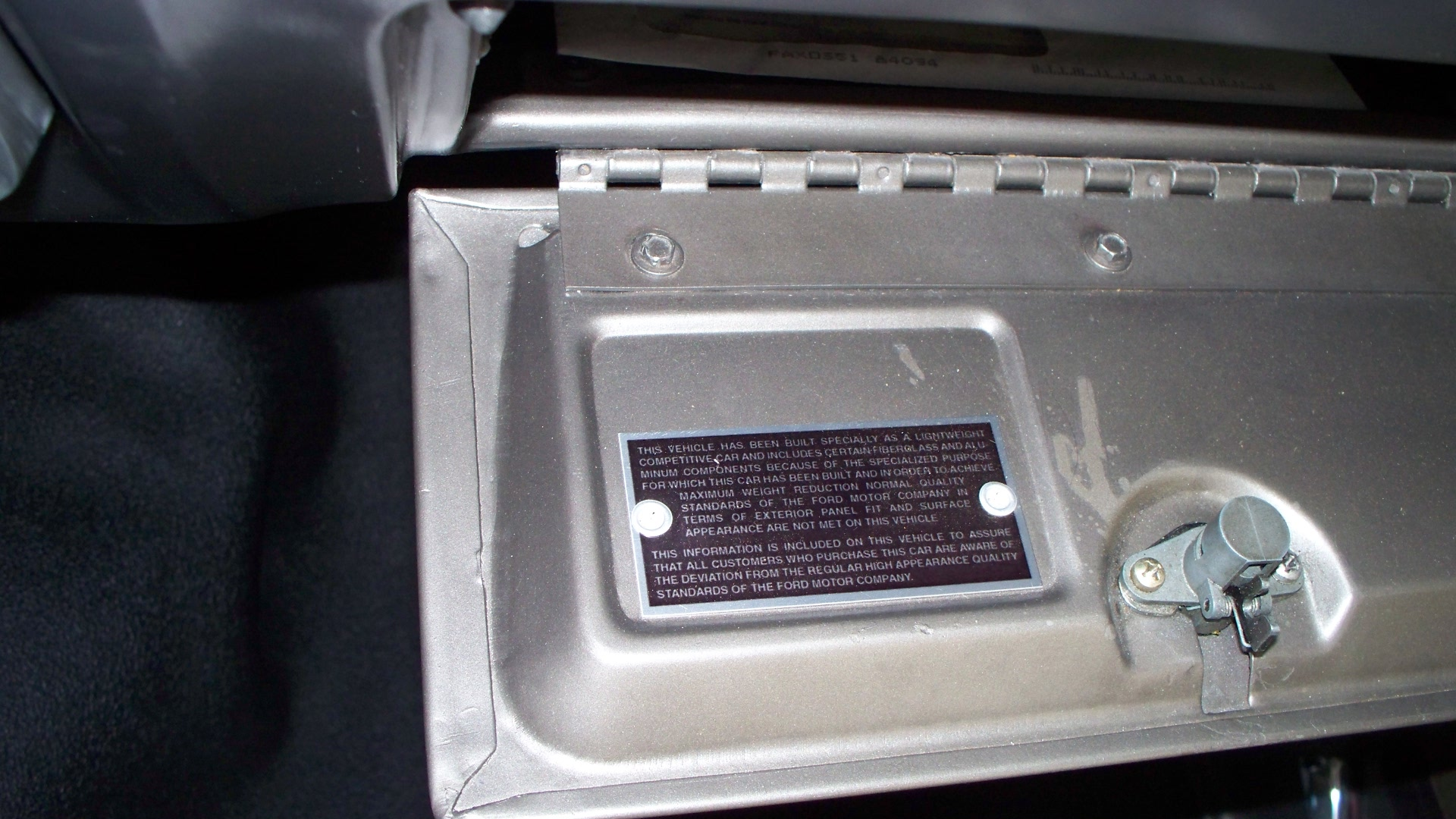
Rare fit and finish disclaimer plate riveted to the inside of the glovebox door

== See also ==
- Timeline of most powerful production cars
