= Muscle car =

High-performance car

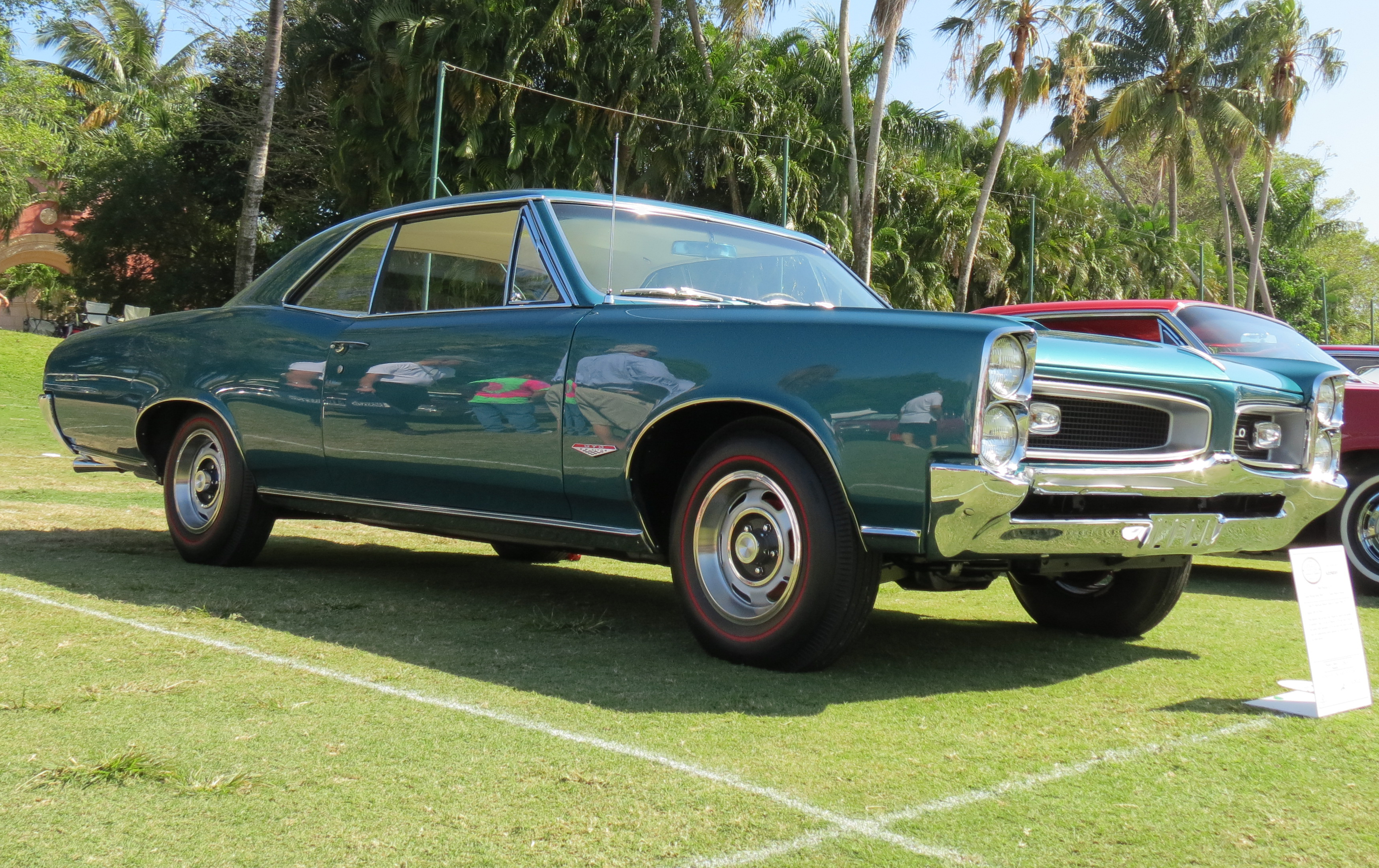
The Pontiac GTO (1966 model pictured) is credited with helping define the 1960s muscle car

A muscle car is an American-made two-door sports coupe with a powerful engine, marketed for its performance.

In 1949, General Motors introduced its 88 with the company's 303-cubic-inch (5 L) OHV Rocket V8 engine, which was previously available only in its luxury Oldsmobile 98. This formula of putting a maker's largest, most powerful engine in a smaller, lighter, more affordable vehicle evolved into the "muscle car" category. Chrysler and Ford quickly followed suit with the Chrysler Saratoga and the Lincoln Capri.

The term "muscle car", which appeared in the mid-1960s, was originally applied to "performance"-oriented street cars produced to fill a newly recognized niche; it entered the general vocabulary through car magazines and automobile marketing and advertising. By the early 1970s, muscle cars included special editions of mass-production cars designed for street and track drag racing. The concept of high performance at lower prices was exemplified by the 1968 Plymouth Road Runner and companion Dodge Super Bee, whose powerful engines drove relatively basic-trimmed intermediate-sized cars that were meant to undercut more expensive, more stylish, and better-appointed models from General Motors and Ford that had come to define the market, such as the Pontiac GTO (1964), 396 Chevrolet Chevelle (1965), 400 Buick Gran Sport (1965), 400 Oldsmobile 442 (1965), as well as the 427 Mercury Comet Cyclone (1964) and 390 Mercury Cyclone (1966).

By some definitions – including those used by Car and Driver, CNBC, Road & Track, and Motor Trend – pony cars such as the Ford Mustang, Chevrolet Camaro, Plymouth Barracuda, Pontiac Firebird, AMC Javelin, and their luxury companions in that large, influential, and lucrative 1960s–70s niche, the Mercury Cougar and Dodge Challenger, could also qualify as "muscle cars" if outfitted with suitable high-performance equipment.

== Terminology ==
=== Definition ===
The definition of a muscle car is subjective and endlessly debated, resulting in the term having few universally agreed characteristics:

- A large high-performance V8 engine, often in the most powerful configuration offered for a particular model
- Rear-wheel drive
- Being manufactured in the United States in the 1960s or early 1970s (the specific year range of 1964–1973 is sometimes used)
- A relatively lightweight two-door body (though opinions vary as to whether high-performance full-size cars, compacts, and pony cars qualify as muscle cars, and why a two-seat AMC AMX could be, but a two-seat Chevrolet Corvette was not. While some feel that only mid-size cars can be considered muscle cars, this view is not held by the top, industry-defining, enthusiast publications, including Car and Driver, Road & Track, and Motor Trend.

High-powered pony cars are sometimes considered muscle cars, as by the above-mentioned publications, with some exceptional personal luxury cars also regarded by some as qualifying on their merits. In the opposite direction, by the late 1960s a wave of inexpensive, straight-line speed oriented stripped down intermediate sedans offered at prices under as US$3,000 (equivalent to $27,775 in 2025) expanded the original definition from a "muscle car" as one offering both performance and some measure of style, accessories, and cachet, and doubled it back toward the drag strip focus of such exceptional early proto-muscle cars as the limited production, factory experimental 1964 Ford Fairlane Thunderbolt.

Sports cars – including those which meet all the above most basic criterion, such as the 1969 ZL-1 Corvette, with an all-aluminum 427 cu in (7.00 L) V8 listed at 430 hp (321 kW) but reported to produce 560 hp (418 kW), that slung the car through the 1/4 mile (0.40 km) traps in 10.89 seconds – are considered muscle cars by some, and not by others. Drag strip-oriented fans see muscle cars as an extension of the hot rodding philosophy of taking a small car and putting a large-displacement engine in it to maximize straight-line speed. However, widespread public acceptance and use of the term, including that exemplified by the Car and Driver, CNBC, Road & Track, and Motor Trend top muscle car lists below, affirm a much broader interpretation as the norm.

=== "Supercar" ===
Muscle cars were initially referred to as "supercars" in the United States, such as the 1957 Rambler Rebel, which was described as a "potent mill turned the lightweight Rambler into a veritable supercar." From the mid-1960s to the mid-1970s, "dragstrip bred" mid-size cars equipped with large V8 engines and rear-wheel drive were also referred to as supercars, more often than muscle cars.

In 1966, the supercar became an "industry trend". This was when the four domestic automakers "needed to cash in on the supercar market" with eye-catching, heart-stopping cars. An example of the use of the supercar description for early muscle car models includes the May 1965 Car Life road test of the Pontiac GTO, followed in 1968 with a Car and Driver review of the 1969 American Motors SC/Rambler describing it as ready to compete in "the Supercar street racer gang" market segment, with the initials "SC" signifying SuperCar, and a 1969 Car Life review that included how "Hurst puts American Motors into the Supercar club with the 390 Rogue".

The supercar market segment in the U.S. at the time included special versions of regular production models that were positioned in several sizes and market segments (such as the "economy supercar"), as well as limited edition, documented dealer-converted vehicles. However, over time the term came to be applied to much, much more expensive and exotic cars, which claimed the name supercar.

== History ==
=== 1950s: Origins ===
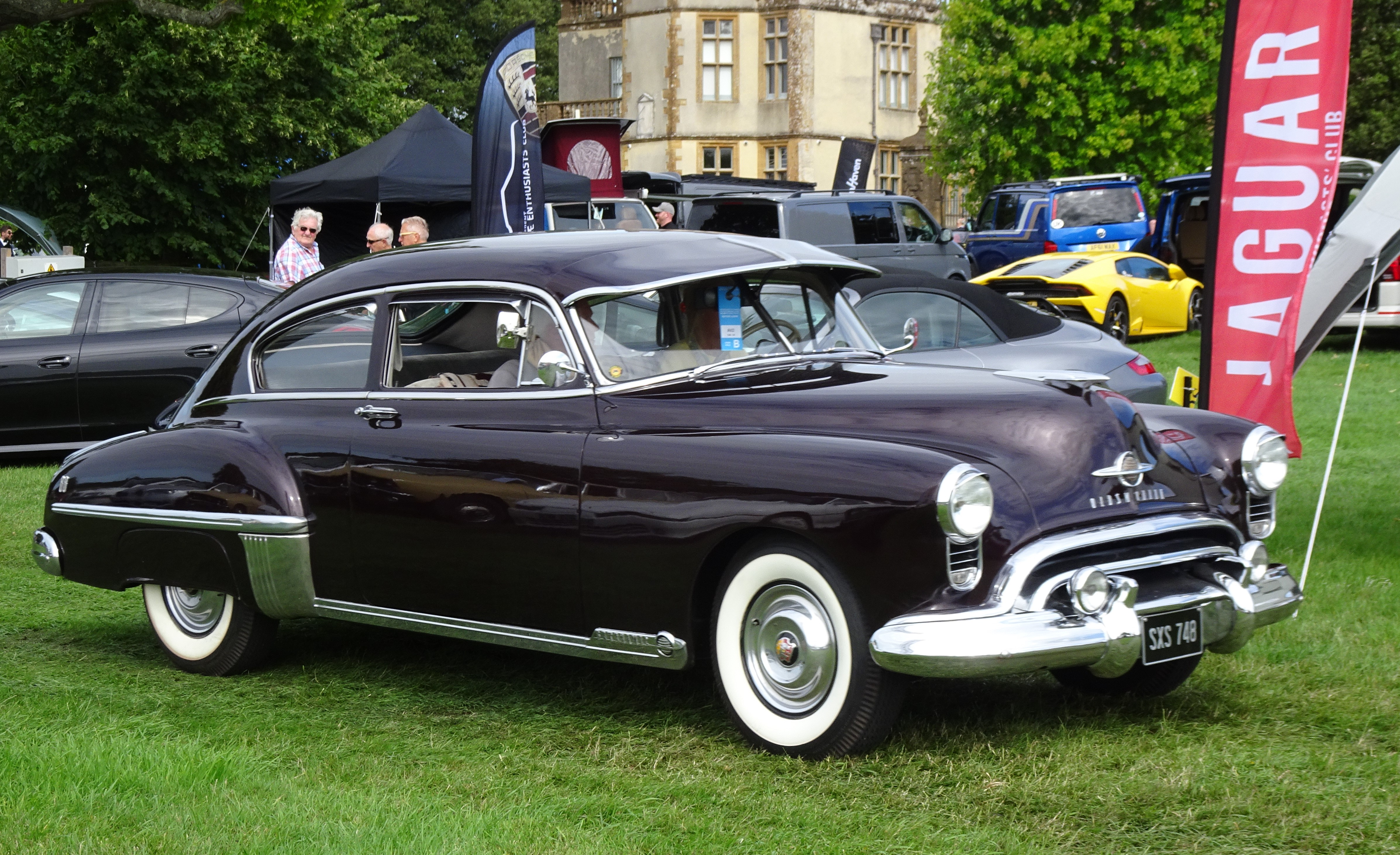
1949 Oldsmobile 88

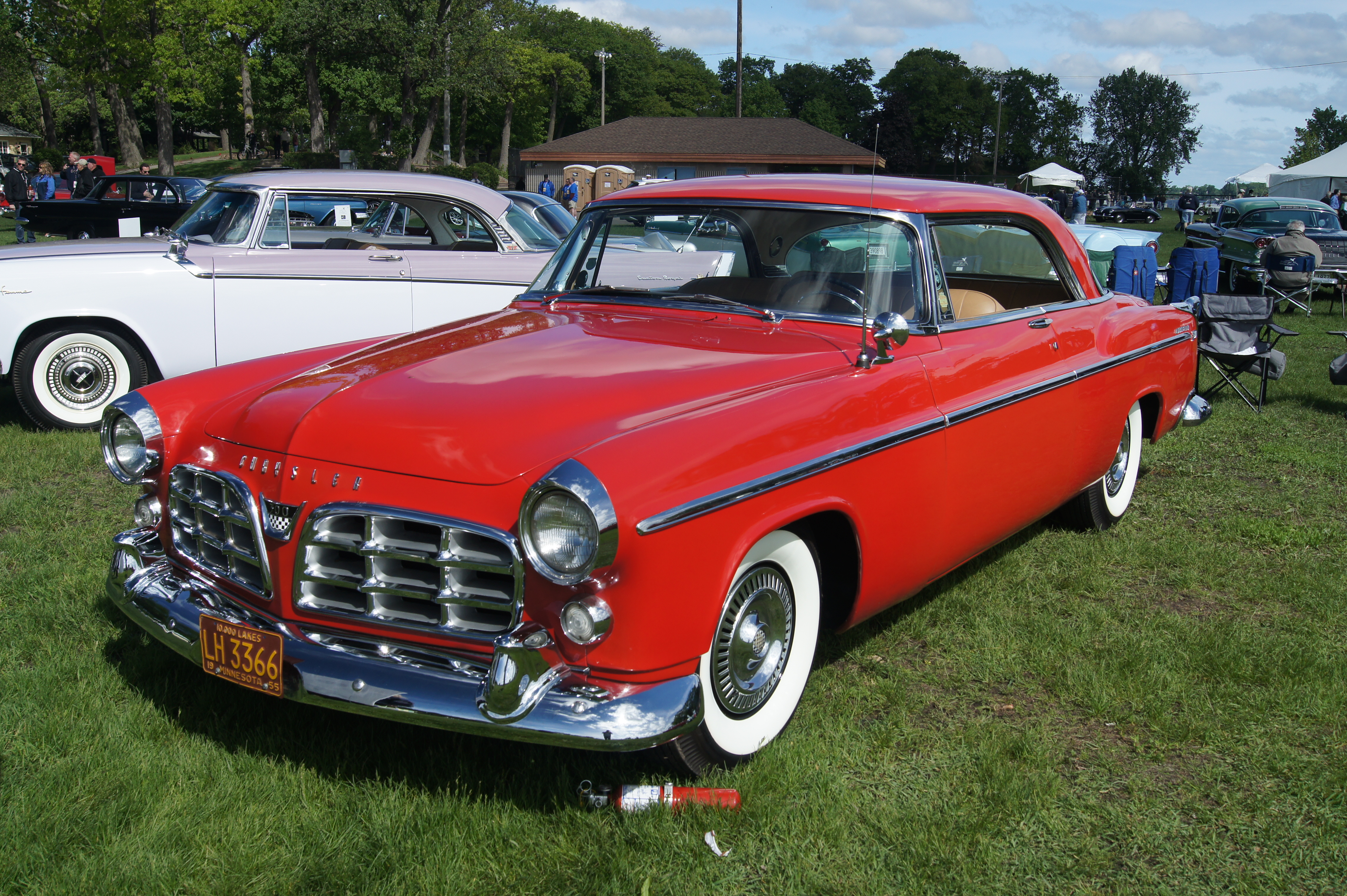
1955 Chrysler C-300

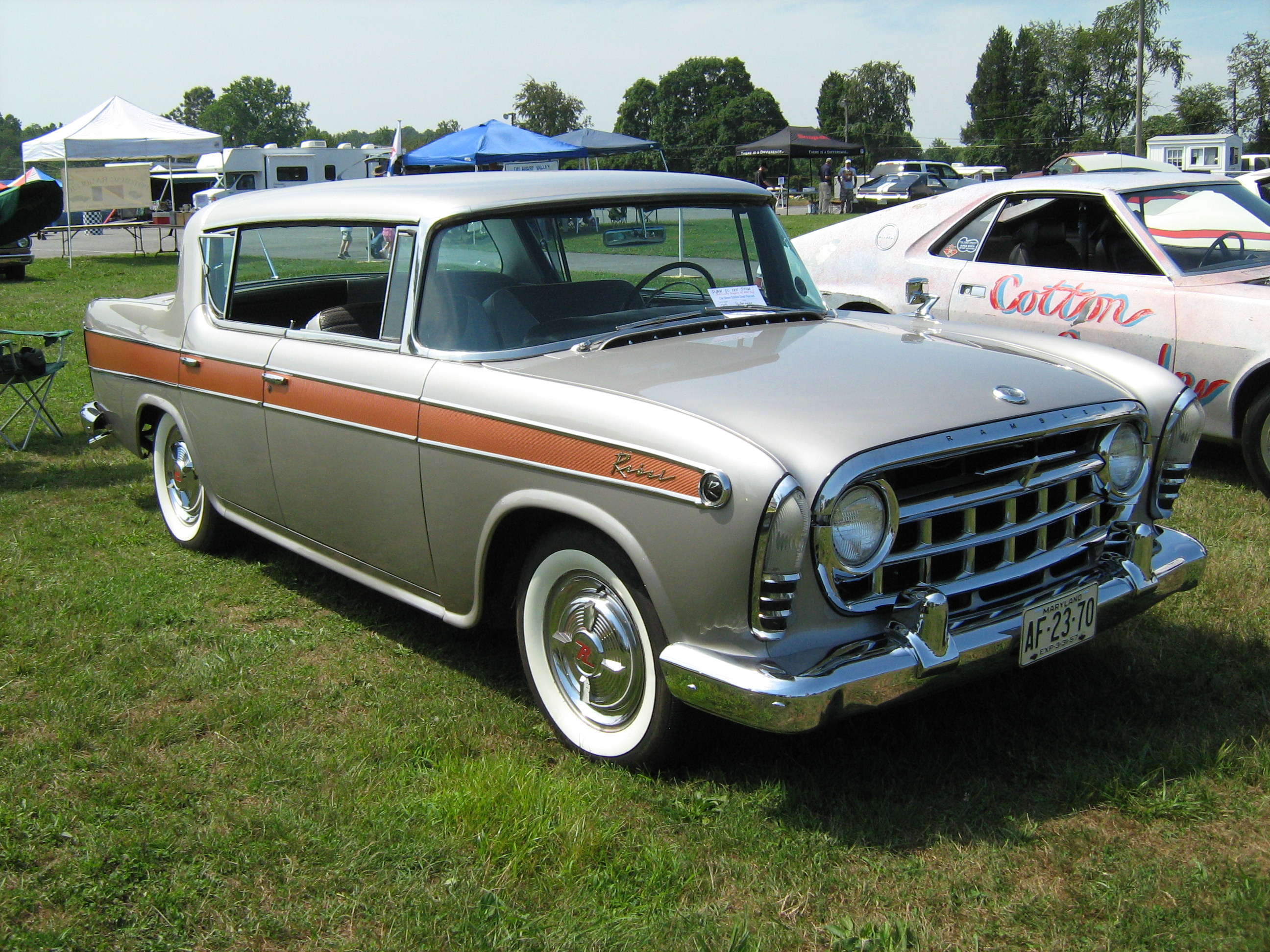
1957 Rambler Rebel

Opinions on the origin of the muscle car vary, but the 1949 Oldsmobile Rocket 88 is cited as the first full-sized muscle car. The Rocket 88 was the first time a powerful V8 engine was available in a smaller and lighter body style (in this case the 303 cu in (5.0 L) engine from the larger Oldsmobile 98 with the body from the six-cylinder Oldsmobile 76). The Rocket 88 produced 135 hp (101 kW) at 3600 rpm and 263 lb⋅ft (357 N⋅m) at 1800 rpm and won eight out of ten races in the 1950 NASCAR season. The Rocket 88's Oldsmobile 303 V8 engine, along with the Cadillac 331 engine, also introduced in 1949, are stated to have "launched the modern era of the high-performance V-8."

In 1955, the large-sized Chrysler C-300 - the first in a long, 15-year series of large, expensive, performance-first Chryslers - was introduced that produced 300 hp (224 kW) from its 331 cu in (5.4 L) V8 engine, and it was advertised as "America's Most Powerful Car". Capable of accelerating from 0 to 60 mph (97 km/h) in 9.8 seconds and reaching 130 mph (209 km/h), the 1955 Chrysler 300 is also recognized as one of the best-handling cars of its era.

The compact-sized 1956 Studebaker Golden Hawk was powered by a 275 hp (205 kW) 352 cu in (5.8 L) Packard V8, the second most powerful engine to the Chrysler 300.

The Rambler Rebel, introduced by American Motors Corporation (AMC) in 1957, is the first mid-sized car to be available with a big-block V8 engine. The Rebel followed most of the muscle car formula including "make 'em go fast as well as cheaply." It is therefore considered by some to be the first muscle car. With a 327 cu in (5.4 L) V8 engine producing 255 hp (190 kW), its 0–60 mph acceleration of 7.5 seconds made it the fastest stock American sedan at the time. Only the fuel-injected Chevrolet Corvette beat it by half a second.

=== Early 1960s: Drag racing influences ===
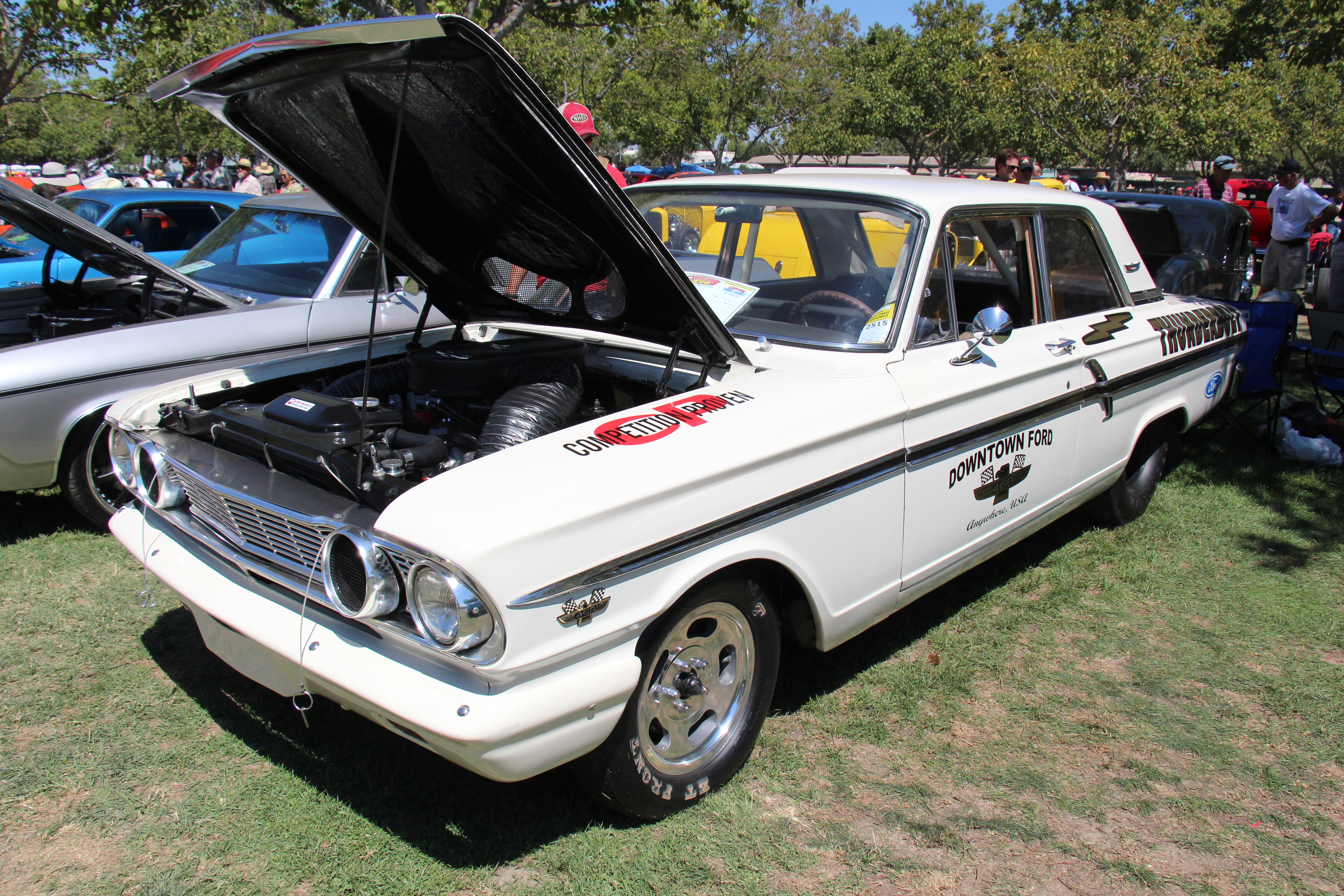
1964 Ford Fairlane Thunderbolt

The popularity and performance of muscle cars grew in the early 1960s. This was when Mopar (Dodge, Plymouth, and Chrysler) and Ford battled for supremacy in drag racing. The 1961 Chevrolet Impala offered an SS package for $53.80, which consisted of a 409 cu in (6.7 L) V8 engine producing 425 hp (317 kW) along with upgraded brakes, tires, and suspension. The 1962 Dodge Dart 413 (nicknamed Max Wedge) had a 413 cu in (6.8 L) V8 which produced 420 hp (313 kW) and could cover the quarter-mile in under 13 seconds.

In 1963, two hundred Ford Galaxie "R-code" cars were factory-built specifically for drag racing, resulting in a full-size car that could cover the quarter-mile in a little over 12 seconds. Upgrades included fiberglass panels, aluminum bumpers, traction bars, and a 427 cu in (7.0 L) Ford FE-based racing engine conservatively rated at 425 hp (317 kW). The road-legal version of the Galaxie 427 used the "Q-code" engine which produced 410 hp (306 kW). The following year, Ford installed the proven 427 "top-oiler" engine in the smaller and lighter Fairlane body, creating the Ford Thunderbolt. The Thunderbolt included several weight-saving measures (including acrylic windows and fibreglass/aluminium body panels and bumpers) and a stock Thunderbolt could cover the quarter-mile in 11.76 seconds. The Thunderbolt was technically road-legal, however, it was considered unsuitable even "for driving to and from the (drag)strip, let alone on the street in everyday use". A total of 111 Thunderbolts were built.

The General Motors competitor to the Thunderbolt was the Z-11 option package for the full-size Chevrolet Impala coupe, of which 57 examples were produced in 1963 only. The Z-11 Impala was powered by a 427 cu in (7.0 L) version of the W-series big-block engine, which was officially rated at 430 bhp (321 kW). With a compression ratio of 13.5:1, the engine required high-octane fuel. The RPOZ-11 package also included weight reduction measures such as an aluminum hood and fenders, the removal of sound-deadening material as well as the deletion of the heater and radio.

In 1964, a drag racing version of the Dodge 330 was created, called the "330 Lightweight". It was powered by a 426 cu in (7.0 L) version of the Hemi racing engine which was official rated at 425 hp (317 kW), but rumored to have an actual power output higher than this. Weight reduction measures included an aluminium hood as well as lightweight front bumpers, fenders and doors, polycarbonate side windows, and no sound deadening. Like other lightweights of the era, it came with a factory disclaimer: "Designed for supervised acceleration trials. Not recommended for general everyday driving because of the compromises in the all-round characteristics which must be made for this type of vehicle."

Also using the 426 cu in (7.0 L) Hemi racing engine was the limited production 1965 Plymouth Satellite. In 1966, the racing version of the 426 Hemi was replaced by a detuned "Street Hemi" version, also with a displacement of 426 cu in (7.0 L) and an official power rating of 425 bhp (317 kW)). The 1966 Plymouth Satellite 426 Hemi could run a 13.8-second quarter-mile at 104 mph (167 km/h) and had a base price of $3,850.

=== 1964–1970: Peak muscle car era ===
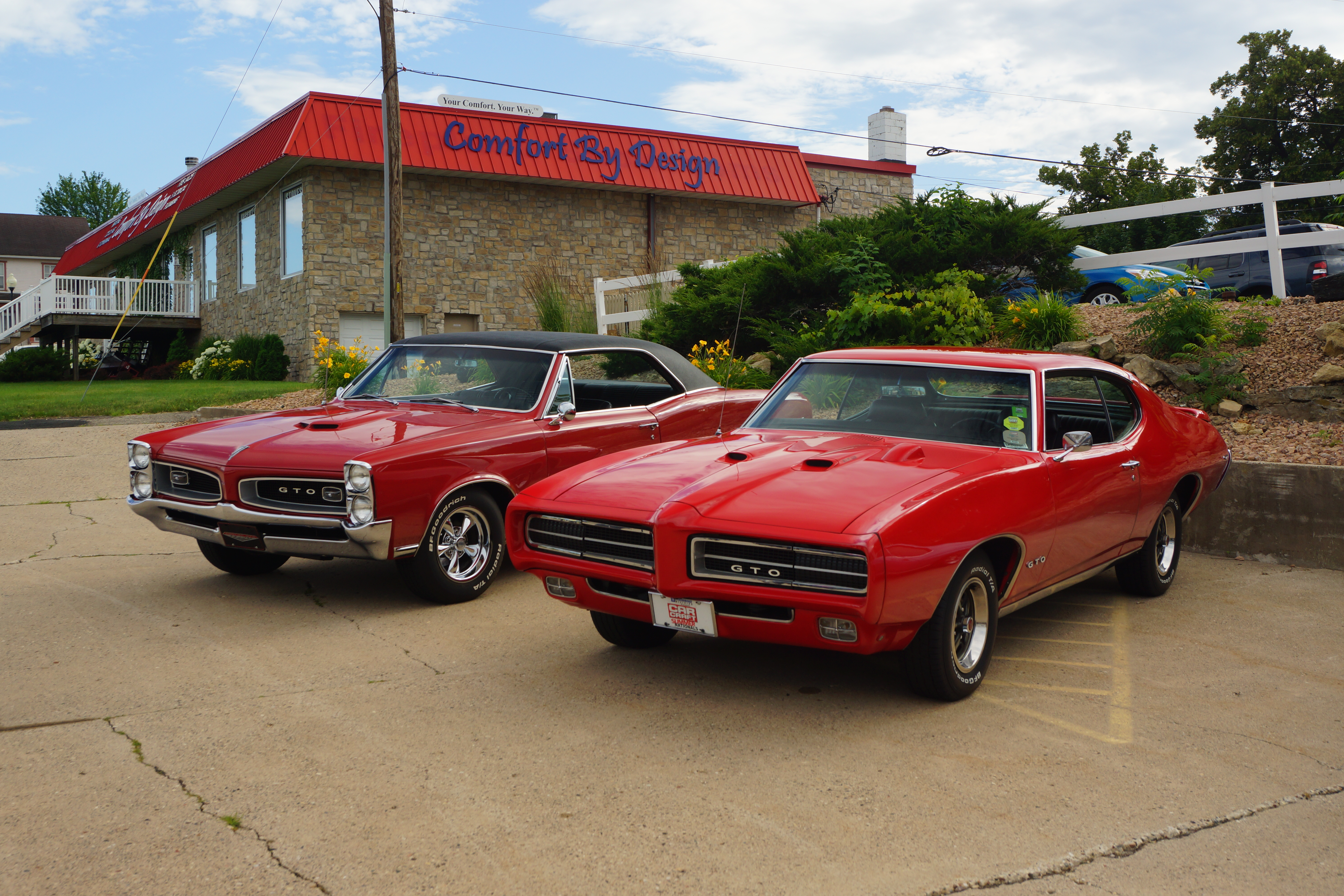
1966 and 1969 Pontiac GTO

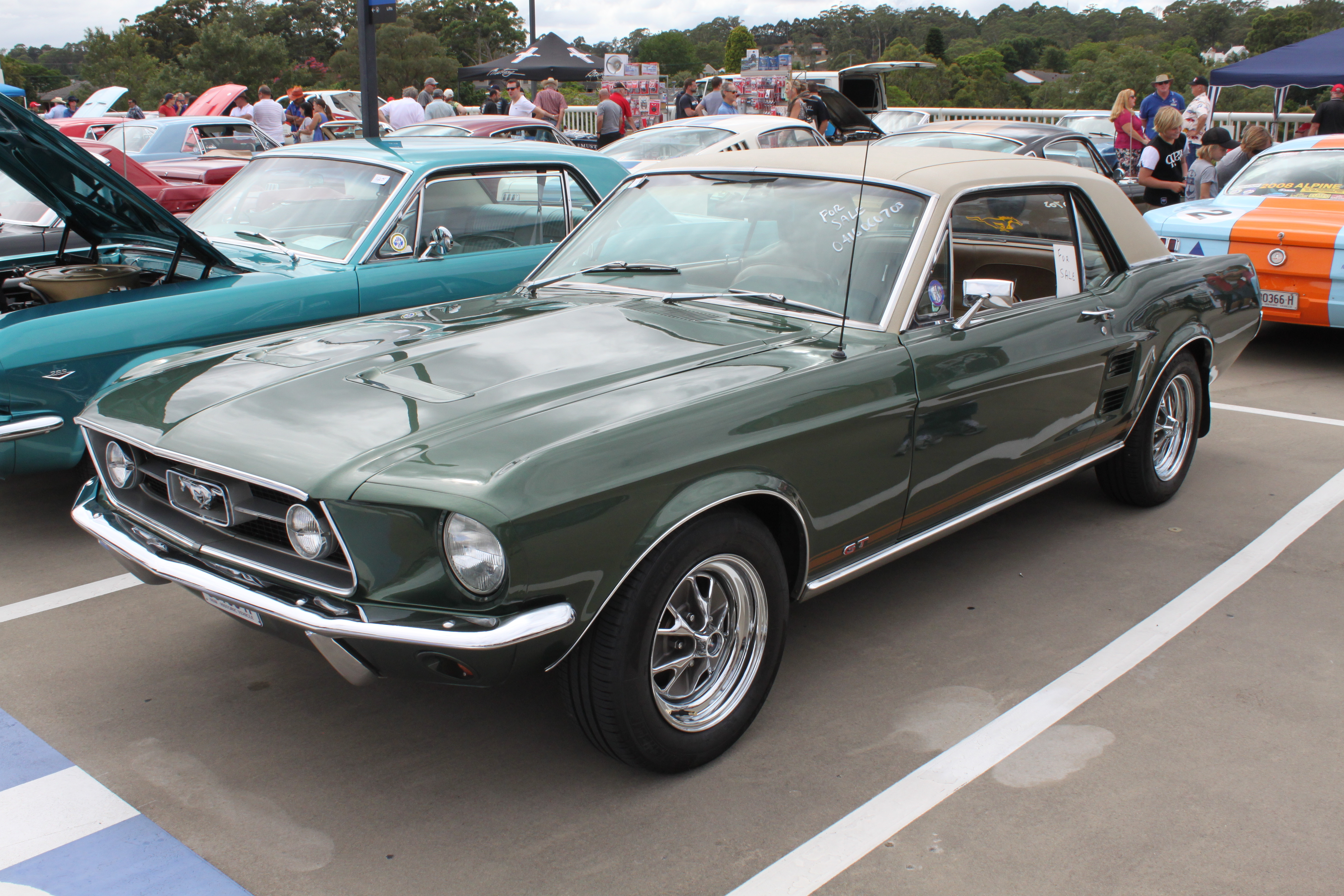
1967 Ford Mustang

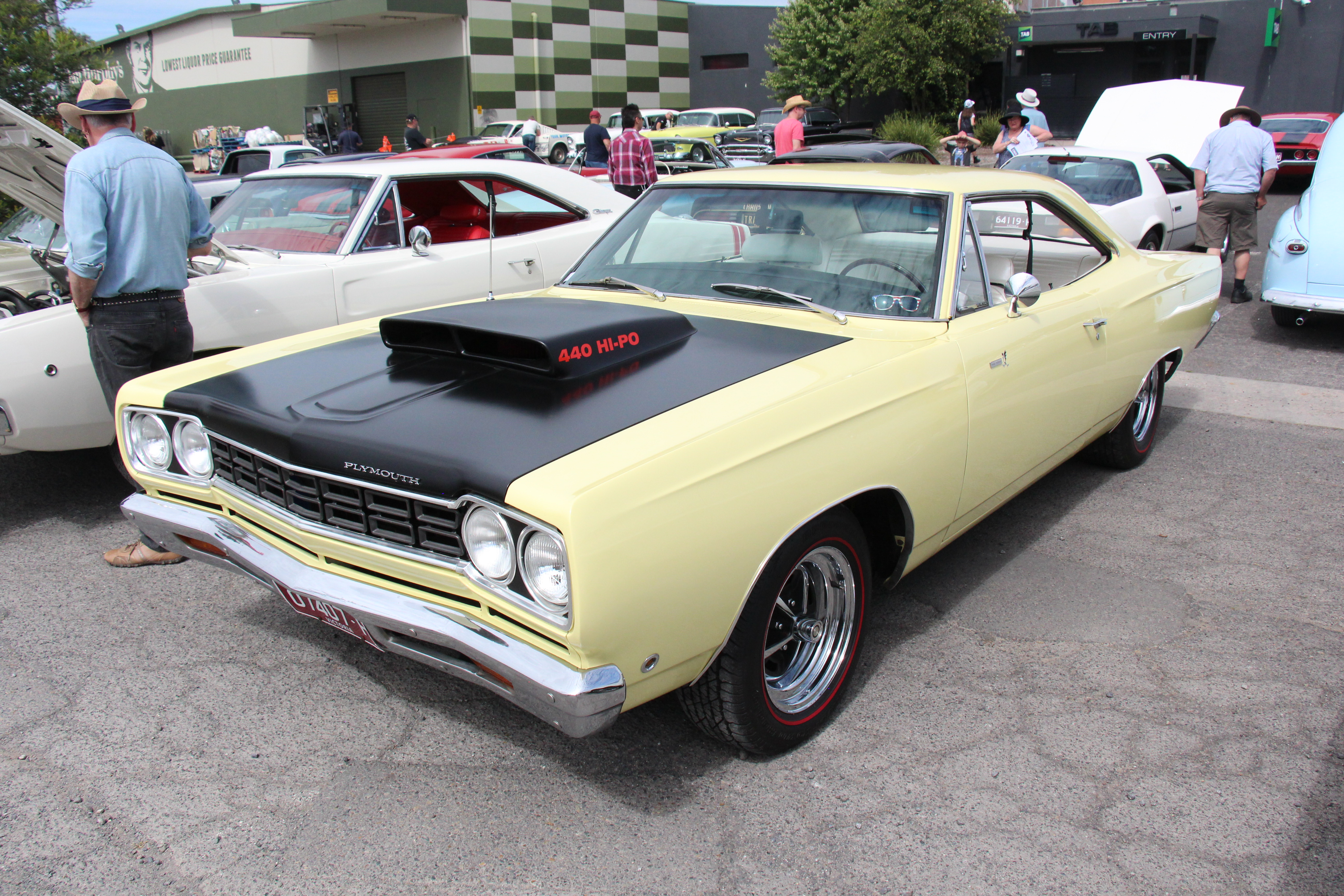
1968 Plymouth Road Runner

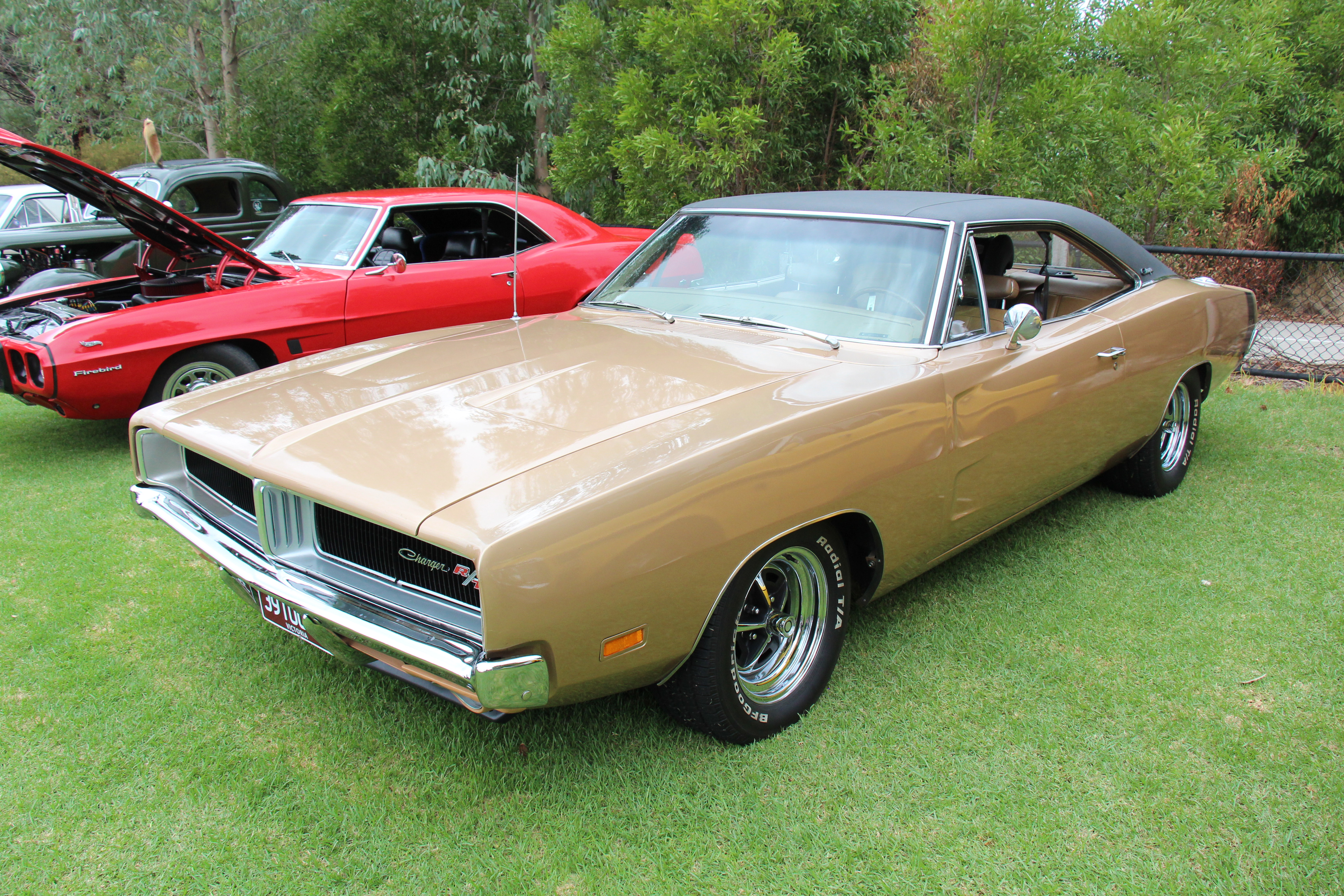
1969 Dodge Charger

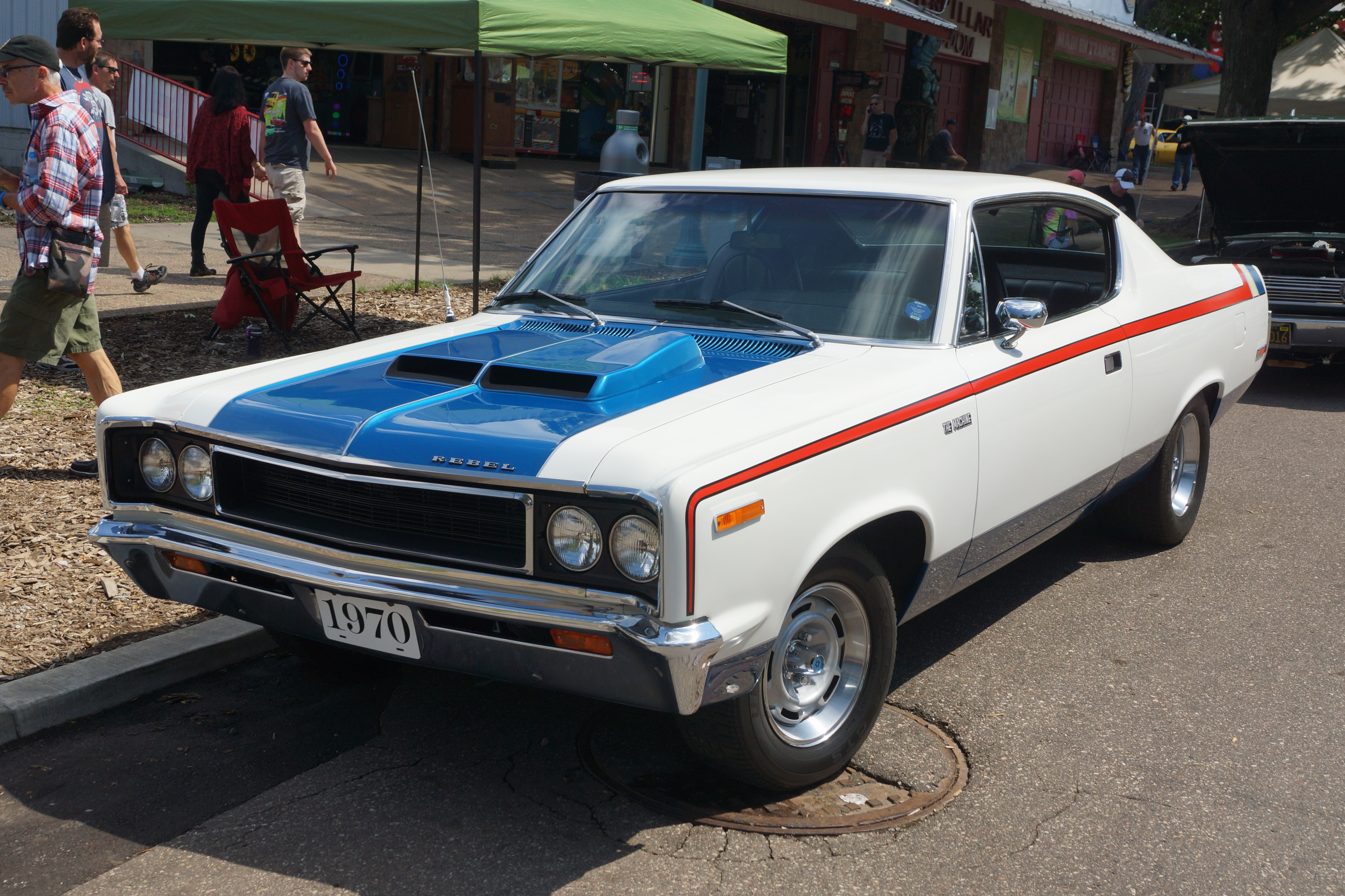
1970 AMC Rebel "The Machine"

Although pure muscle cars often sold in relatively small volumes, manufacturers valued the halo effect of the publicity created by these models. Competition between manufacturers led to a horsepower war that peaked in 1970, with models such as the LS-6 Chevelle advertising as much as 450 hp (336 kW).

The Pontiac GTO, a car that captured the public mind and strongly influenced the muscle car era, was introduced in 1964 as an optional package for the intermediate-size Pontiac Tempest. The GTO was developed by Pontiac division president John DeLorean and engineer Bill Collins and was initially powered by a 389 cu in (6.4 L) V8 engine producing 325 hp (242 kW). The success of the GTO led other GM divisions to develop muscle cars based on intermediate-sized platforms: the 1964 Oldsmobile 442, 1964 Chevrolet Chevelle SS, and 1965 Buick Gran Sport.

The AMC V8 engine was enlarged to 390 cu in (6.4 L) in 1968, which produced 315 hp (235 kW) and was first used in the 1968 AMC Rebel SST, AMC Javelin Go-package, and AMC AMX. A staid and distant fourth behind Detroit's "Big Three", AMC hired Dick Teague as a designer, who later became the vice president. The clean sheet Javelin pony car and two-seat Corvette-competitor AMX were bold moves, and moved AMC directly into the era's "horsepower wars".

As the 1960s progressed, optional equipment and luxury appointments increased in many popular models of "performance-oriented" cars. With the added weight and power-consuming accessories and features, engines had to be more powerful to maintain performance levels, and the cars became more expensive. In response, some "budget" muscle cars began to appear, such as the 1967 Plymouth GTX, the 1968 Plymouth Road Runner, and the 1968 Dodge Super Bee. In 1969, the Plymouth Road Runner was awarded Motor Trend magazine's Car of the Year. With optional performance parts such as intake and exhaust manifolds, upgraded carburetor, and drag-racing tires, the Road Runner had a quarter-mile time of 14.7 seconds at 100.6 mph (162 km/h). In this customized form, the cost of the Road Runner was US$3,893.

The Plymouth Barracuda was a pony car that could be turned into a muscle car with the addition of the famed Chrysler 426 Hemi, available as an option beginning in 1968, after debuting in street form two years earlier in the Plymouth Belvedere, Dodge Coronet, and Dodge Charger. Originally based on the smaller compact car body and chassis of the Plymouth Valiant, the Barracuda was also available with a 383 cu in (6.3 L) V8 engine producing 300 hp (224 kW). It could run a quarter-mile in 13.33 seconds at 106.50 mph (171 km/h) on the drag strip. The base price was $2,796.00; the price as tested by Hot Rod was $3,652. The related 1970 Plymouth Duster was powered by a 340 cu in (5.6 L) V8 engine producing 290 hp (216 kW). Performance figures were 0 to 60 mph (97 km/h) in 6.0 seconds and the quarter-mile time of in 14.7 seconds at 94.3 mph (152 km/h).

The 427 cu in (7.0 L) Chevrolet L72 big-block engine became available in the mid-sized Chevrolet Chevelle in 1969 as the COPO 427 option. The 427 Chevelle could run a 13.3 sec. quarter-mile at 108 mph (174 km/h). Chevrolet rated the engine at 425 hp (317 kW), but the NHRA claimed power output to be 450 hp (336 kW). The following year, the "Chevelle SS 454" model was introduced, which used the 454 cu in (7.4 L) Chevrolet LS6 big-block engine rated at 450 hp (336 kW), the highest factory rating at that time.

The fastest muscle car produced by American Motors was the mid-sized 1970 AMC Rebel "The Machine", which was powered by a 390 cu in (6.4 L) engine producing 340 hp (254 kW). The Rebel had a 0–60 mph (97 km/h) time of 6.8 seconds and a quarter-mile run in 14.4 seconds at 99 mph (159 km/h).

=== 1970s: Decline of the segment ===
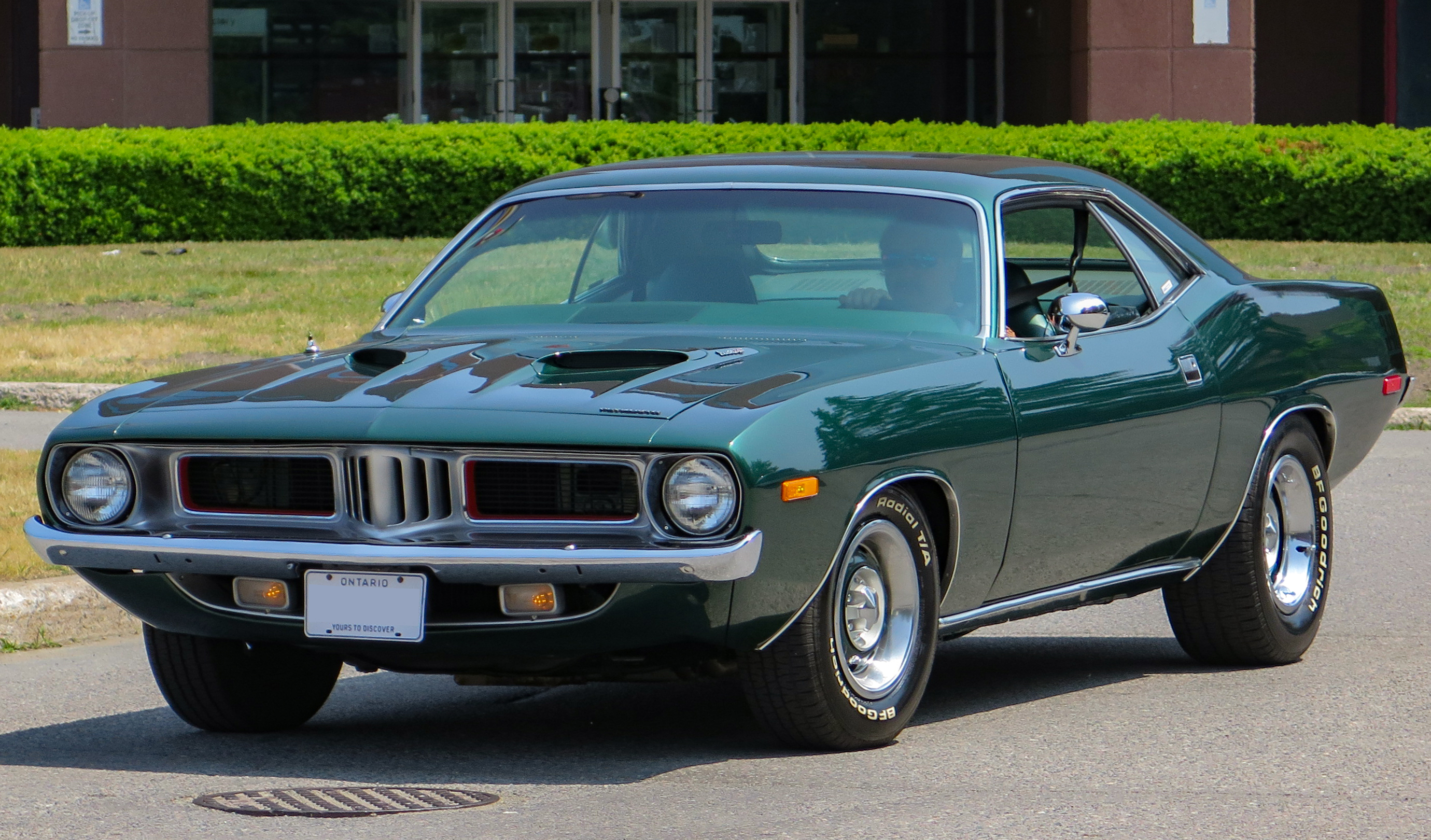
1973 Plymouth Barracuda

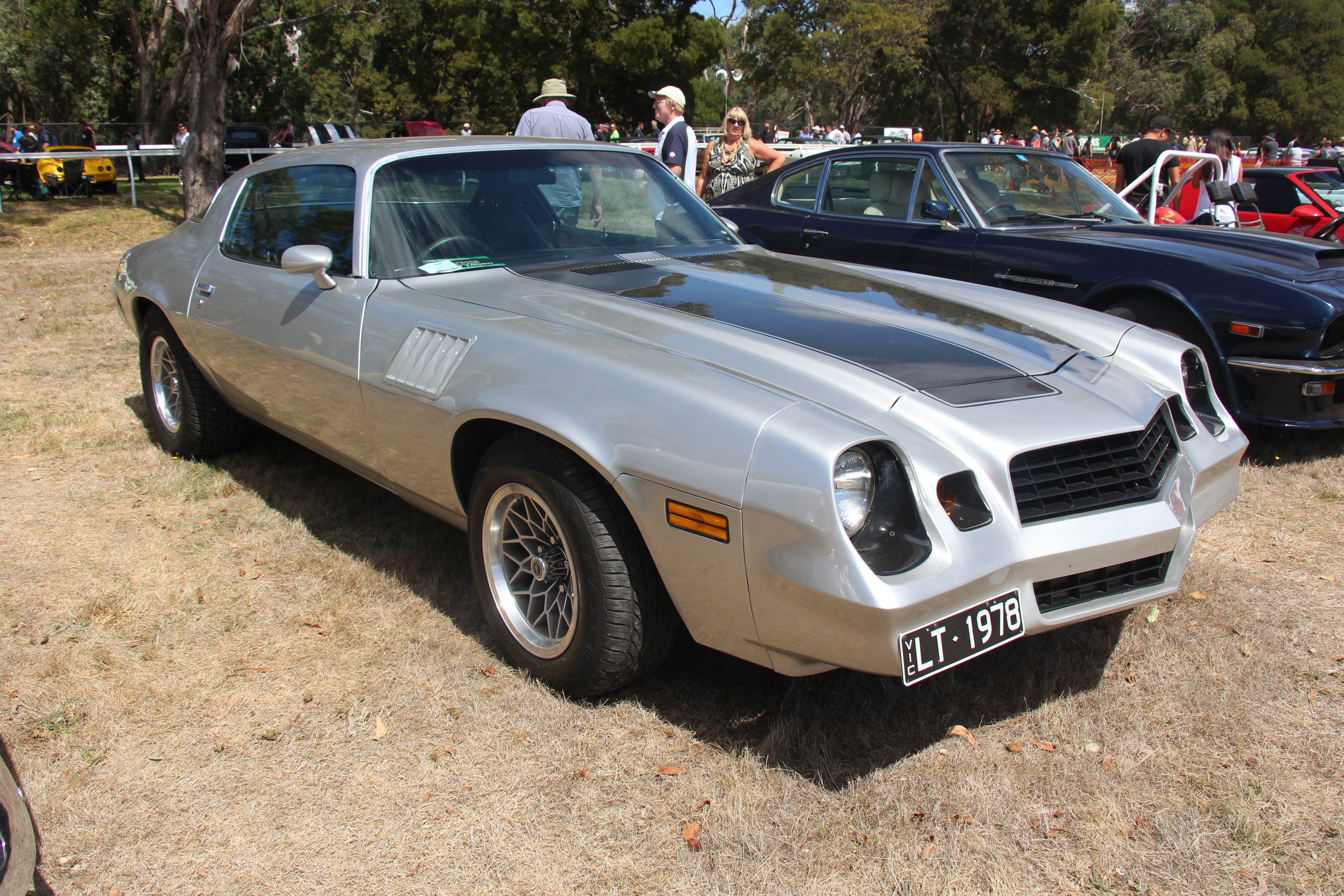
1978 Chevrolet Camaro

The popularity of muscle cars declined through the early and mid-1970s due to a combination of factors. These included the 1973 oil crisis that resulted in rationing of fuel and sustained higher prices, which quickly made muscle cars unaffordable and impractical. Insurance companies began placing surcharges for high-horsepower performance cars. Increased focus on air quality meant emissions controls and a switch to unleaded fuel mandated by the Clean Air Act. The optimistic gross horsepower ratings gave way to realistic SAE measured net engine power ratings.

Before the Clean Air Act of 1970, a majority of muscle cars were optioned with high-compression engines (some as high as 11:1), which required high-octane fuel. Before 1970, 100-octane fuel was common. However, following the passage of the Clean Air Act of 1970, octane ratings were lowered to 91 (in part due to the removal of lead). Manufacturers reduced engine compression ratios, resulting in lower performance. Simultaneously, efforts to combat air pollution focused Detroit's attention on emissions control rather than increased power outputs.

The implementation of the National Maximum Speed Law, performance drained, fuel efficiency mattered, and raised insurance rates, the writing had already been on the wall by the early 1970s. Ford introduced a downsized inline four-cylinder powered Mustang II in 1974, which did not even have a V8 option. Concerns about fuel economy prompted Ford to replace the Mustang with a small front-wheel drive model.

Automakers discontinued marketing high-performance models, and the remaining muscle car nameplates were detuned. This followed the shift in the marketplace towards more compact, efficient, and luxurious cars. As demand for muscle cars dropped, a new type of midsize models emerged from U.S. automakers: the personal luxury cars. Manually shifted transmissions, shaker hood scoops, and zero to 60 mph acceleration faded into oblivion. Buyers wanted "landau" vinyl roofs with opera windows, velour interiors, and European-sounding name plates. Offering a soft, comfortable ride along with extra-long hoods and prominent grilles now communicated a sales advantage in the competitive marketplace.

=== 1980s–1990s: Performance revival ===
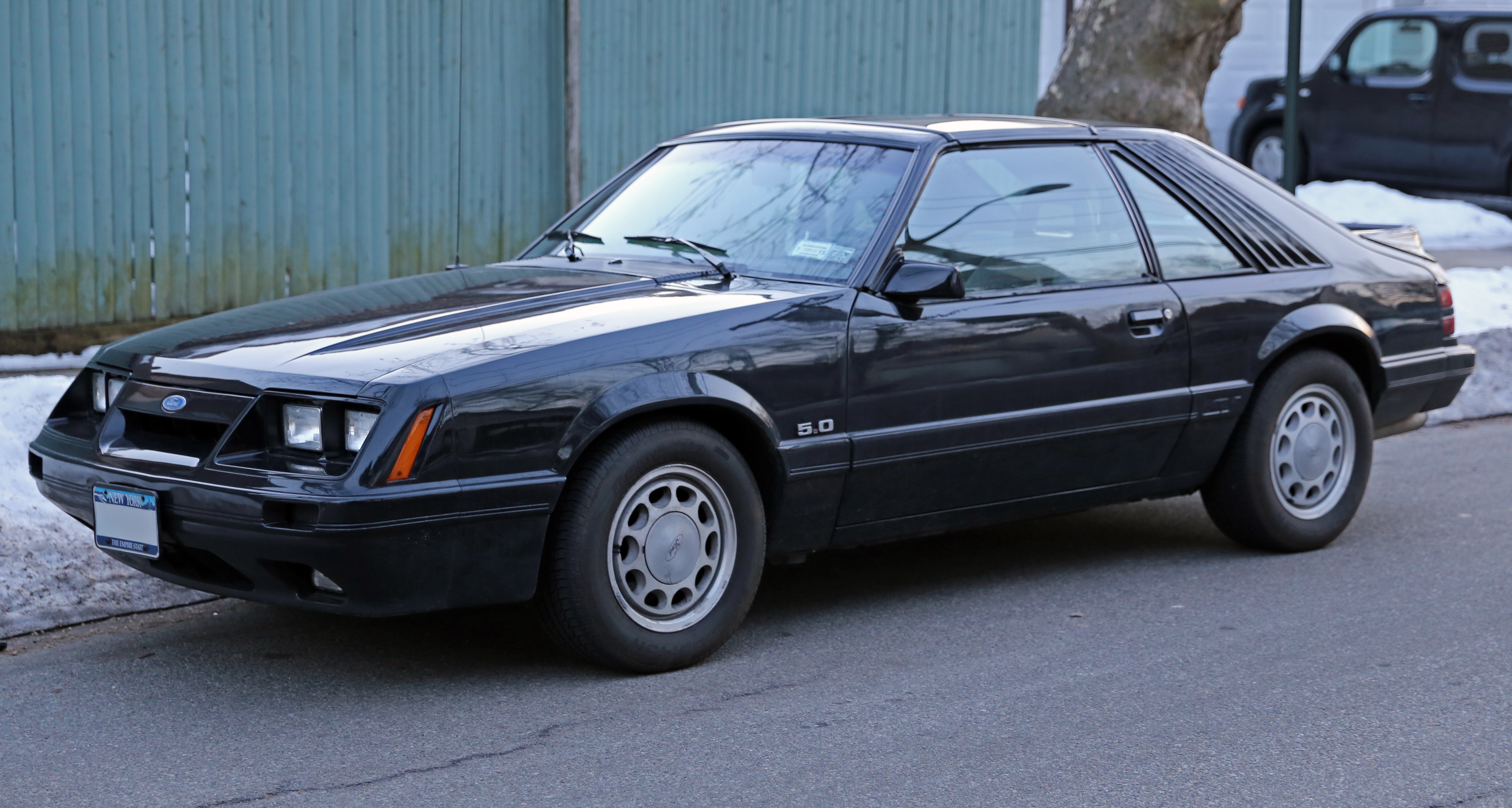
1986 Ford Mustang

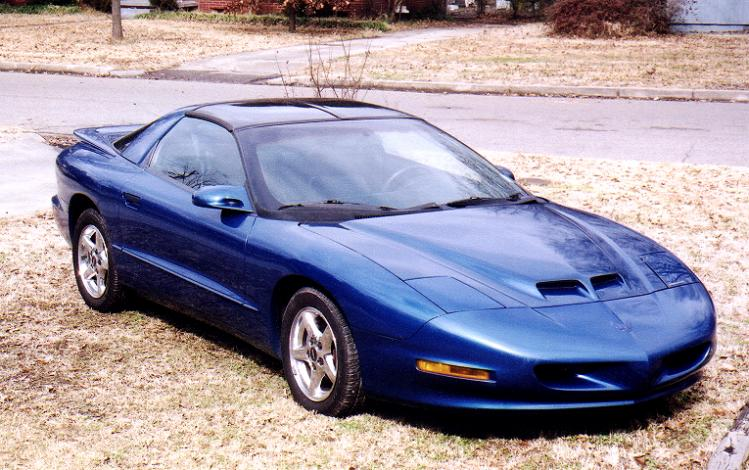
1996 Pontiac Firebird Formula

Muscle car performance began a resurgence in the early 1980s with high-output V8 engines introduced for the Ford Mustang GT, Chevrolet Camaro Z28, and Pontiac Firebird Formula/Trans Am. Initially using four-barrel carburetors, engine performance, and fuel economy were increased by the mid-1980s using electronic fuel injection systems and advanced engine management controls. Muscle car performance began to reappear on intermediate two-door coupés such as the Chevrolet Monte Carlo SS and Buick Regal. The Buick Regal used turbocharged V6 engines on the Grand National, Turbo-T, T-Type, and GNX models which rivaled the performance of V8 engines.

The few muscle cars remaining in production by the mid-1990s included the fourth-generation Ford Mustang, the tenth-generation Ford Thunderbird Super Coupe with its supercharged engine, the fourth-generation Chevrolet Camaro, and fourth-generation Pontiac Firebird.

=== 2000s–present: Retro-styling and market changes ===
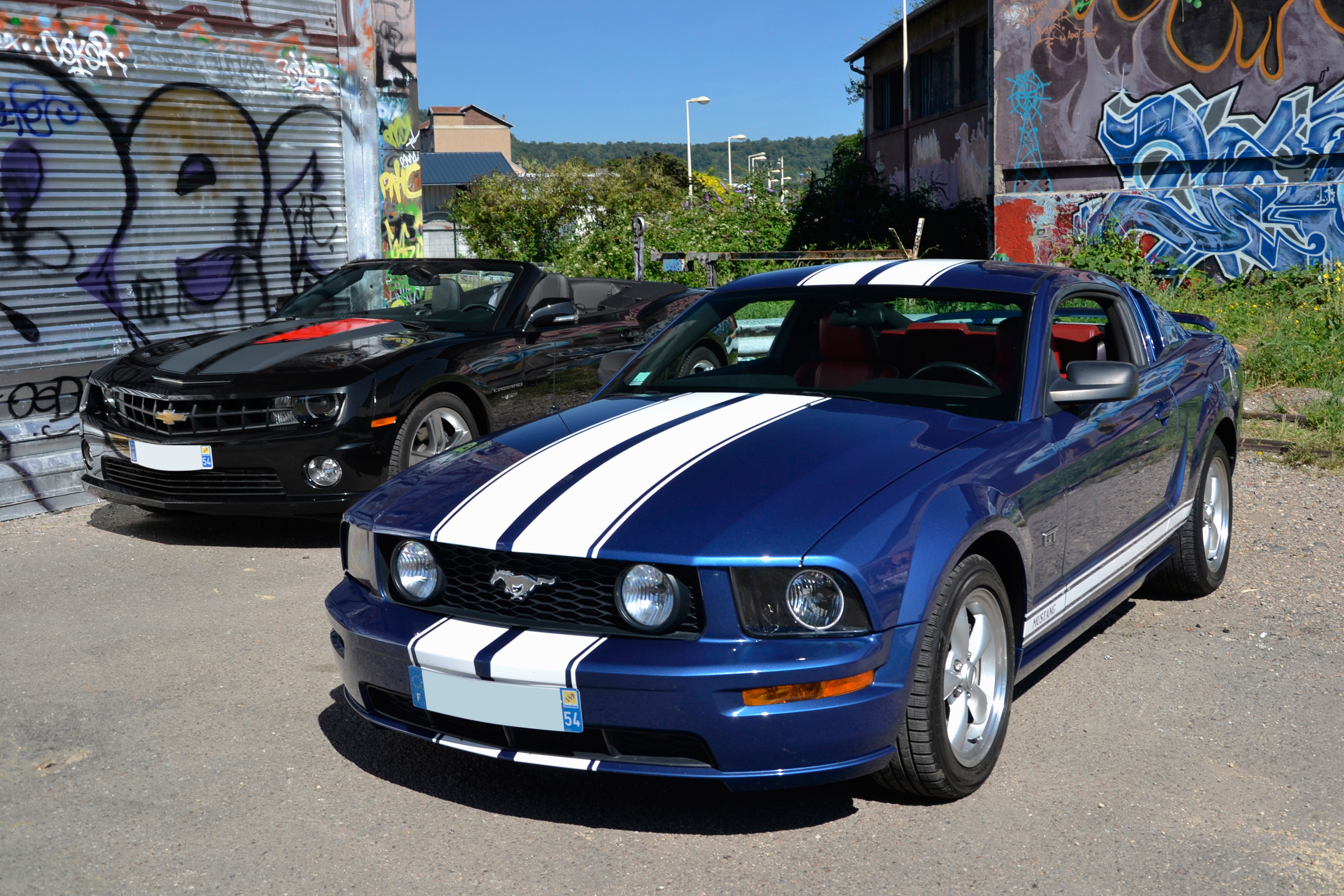
2005–2009 Ford Mustang and 2009–2013 Chevrolet Camaro

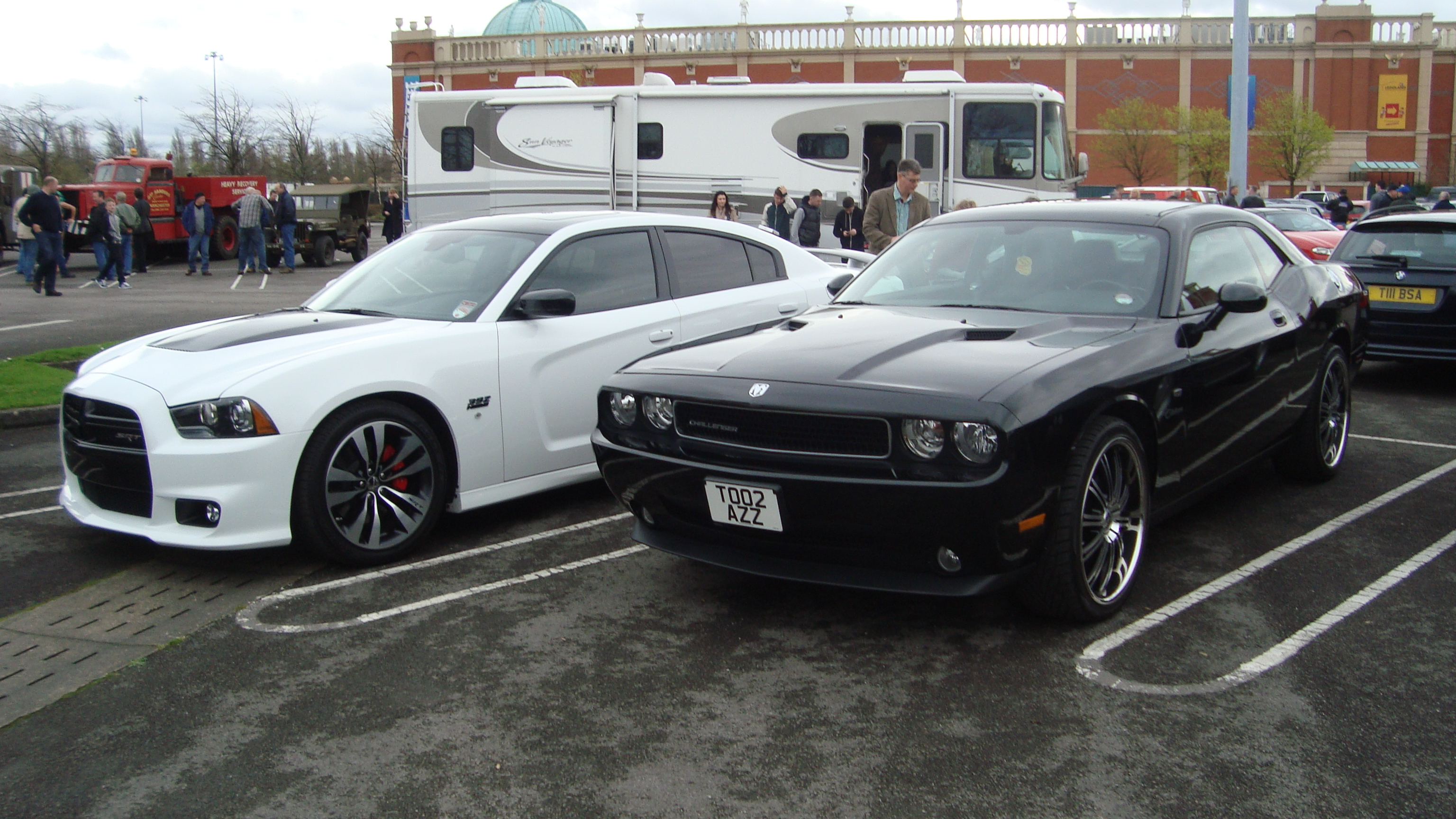
2011–2014 Dodge Charger and 2008–2014 Dodge Challenger

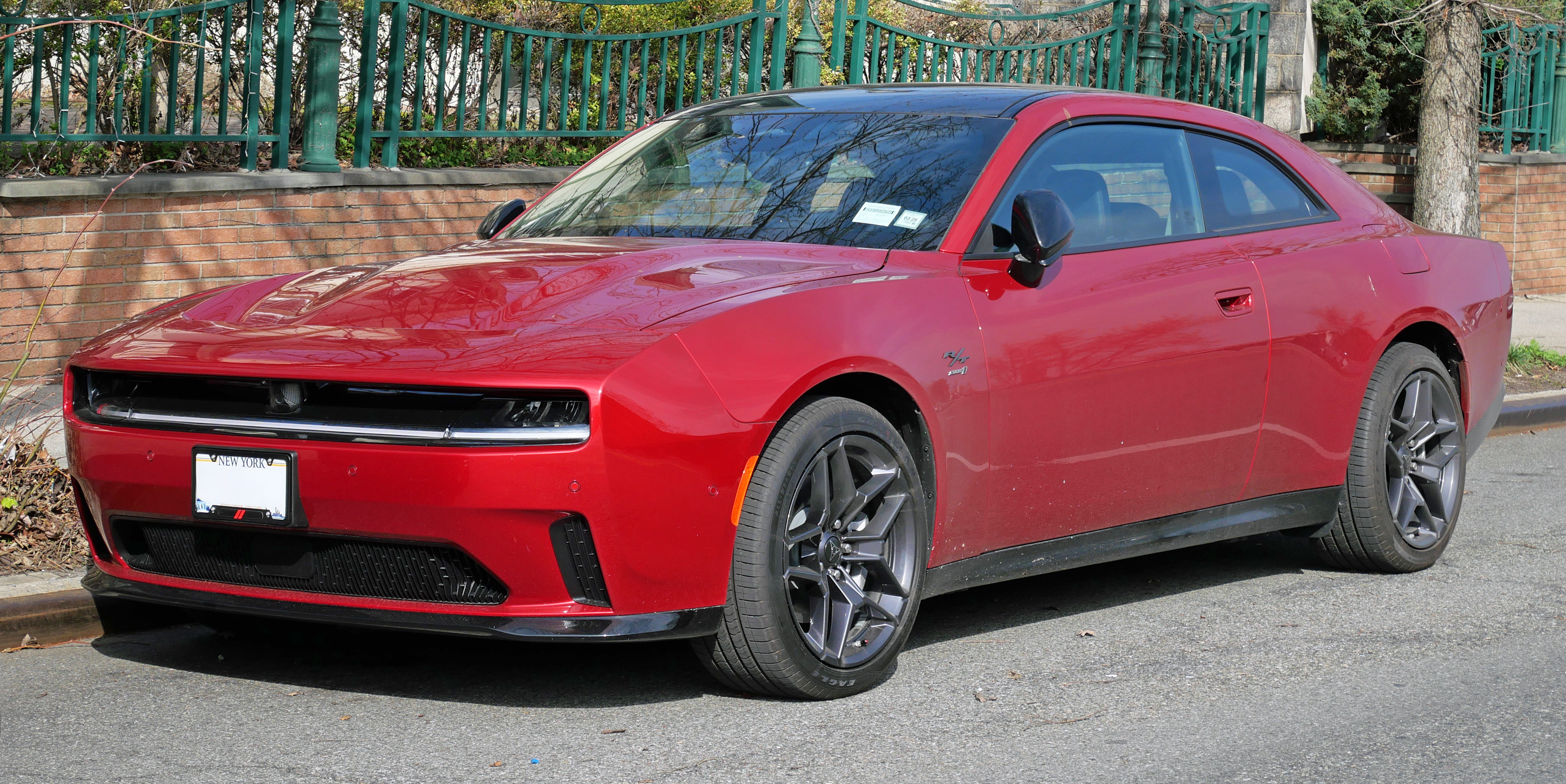
2024 Dodge Charger Daytona RT

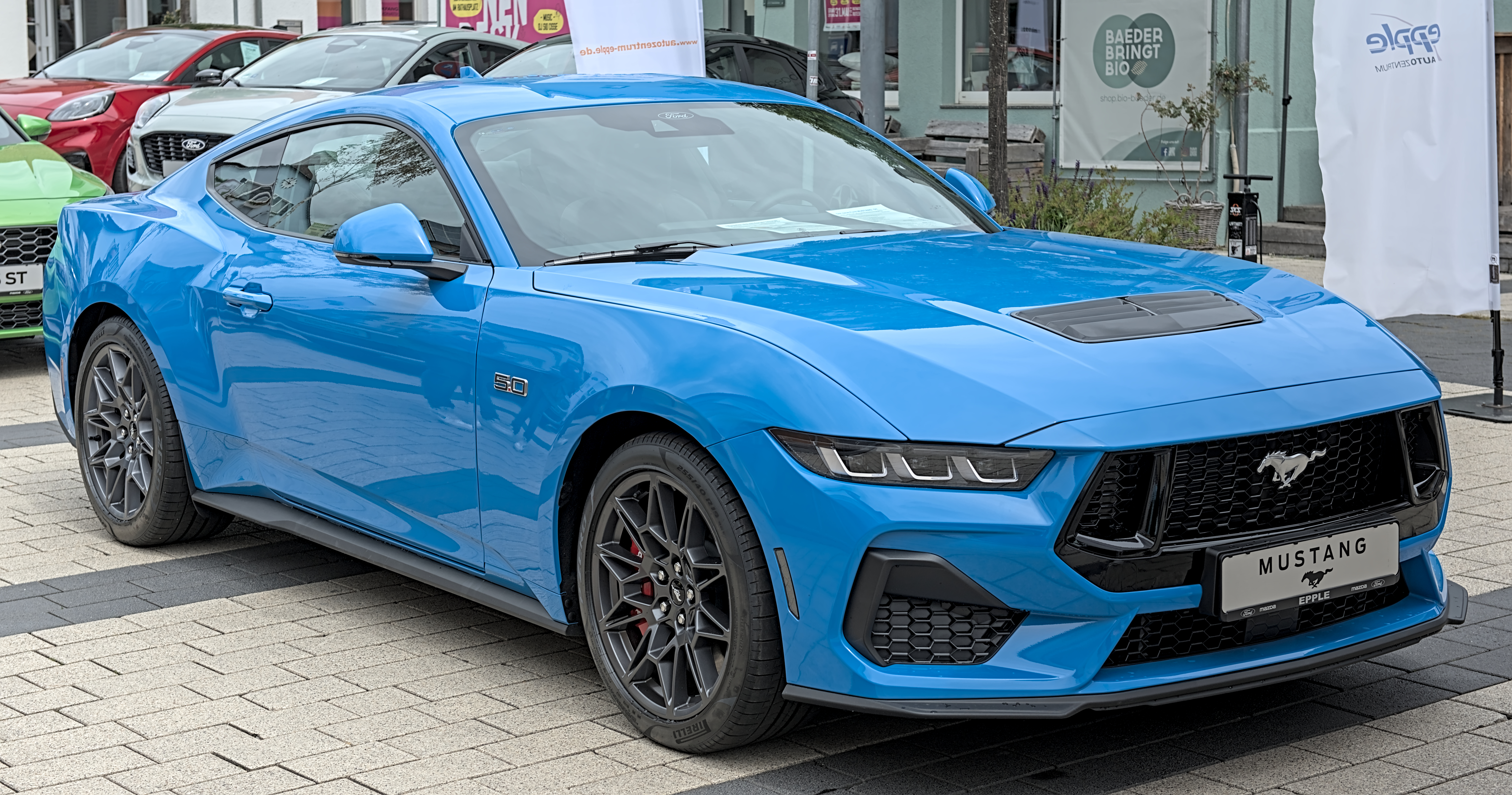
2025 Ford Mustang

For the 2004 model year, the Pontiac GTO was relaunched in the United States as a rebadged captive import version of the Holden Monaro. The model was to recreate the past versions, but the new version "was nothing like the old aggressive and evocative model from the 60s" and it was discontinued in 2006. Following this, many muscle cars released in the 2000s and 2010s were given retro-style designs to evoke the appearances of older muscle car models from the 1960s.

In 2005, Chrysler introduced muscle car heritage to high-performance V8-powered versions of four-door sedans, the Dodge Charger and Chrysler 300C, using nameplates traditionally used for two-door muscle cars. Also in 2005, the fifth-generation Ford Mustang, designed to resemble the original first-generation Mustang, brought back the aggressive lines and colors of the original.

For the 2006 model year, GM relaunched the Chevrolet Monte Carlo SS with the first V8 engine on the Monte Carlo in 15 years. The same V8 was used on the Monte Carlo's W-body sister cars like the Pontiac Grand Prix GXP, Buick Lacrosse Super, and the Chevrolet Impala SS. All Monte Carlo production ended on June 19, 2007, because of declining sales of coupe models in general as well as Chevrolet's plan to replace it with a new Camaro.

In 2008, Chrysler re-introduced the Dodge Challenger, which features styling links to the 1970 first-generation Challenger and was claimed by the Chrysler CEO to be "a modern take on one of the most iconic muscle cars". A year later, running on that same sentiment, Chevrolet released the 2009 fifth-generation Camaro, which bears some resemblance to the 1969 first-generation Camaro.

Through the 2010s, most muscle car external designs were updated continuations of their previous designs from the mid-2000s instead of the full-body redesigns seen decades earlier, owing to their recognizability, with some models such as the Challenger and Camaro remaining nearly identical aside from technological updates such as LED lights or more aggressive styling cues. Changes in the automotive market and consumer trends that continued through the decade into the 2020s, particularly the decline of sedan, coupe, and convertible sales in favor of larger, more practical crossovers, SUVs, and pickup trucks, meant that by the end of the COVID-19 pandemic, muscle cars such as the Mustang, Charger, Challenger, and Camaro were effectively some of the only "cars" produced by the Big Three. Some attempts were made to make performance-oriented "muscle" versions of these larger popular vehicles to accompany traditional muscle cars, such as the Dodge Durango Hellcat, Cadillac Escalade-V, and Ram pickup. Attempts at capitalizing on the names of well-known muscle cars were also made, such as the Ford Mustang Mach-E (an electric car with Mustang-derived styling cues but little relation to the Mustang itself), Chevrolet's plans to introduce a crossover based on the Camaro, and Ford's potential plans to develop a traditional four-door sedan version of the Mustang.

The 2024 Dodge Charger Daytona, replacing the earlier Dodge Charger and Dodge Challenger, was first released with a battery electric powertrain with an internal combustion engine version scheduled for release a year later in 2025, making it the first electric muscle car to enter production.

== Australia ==
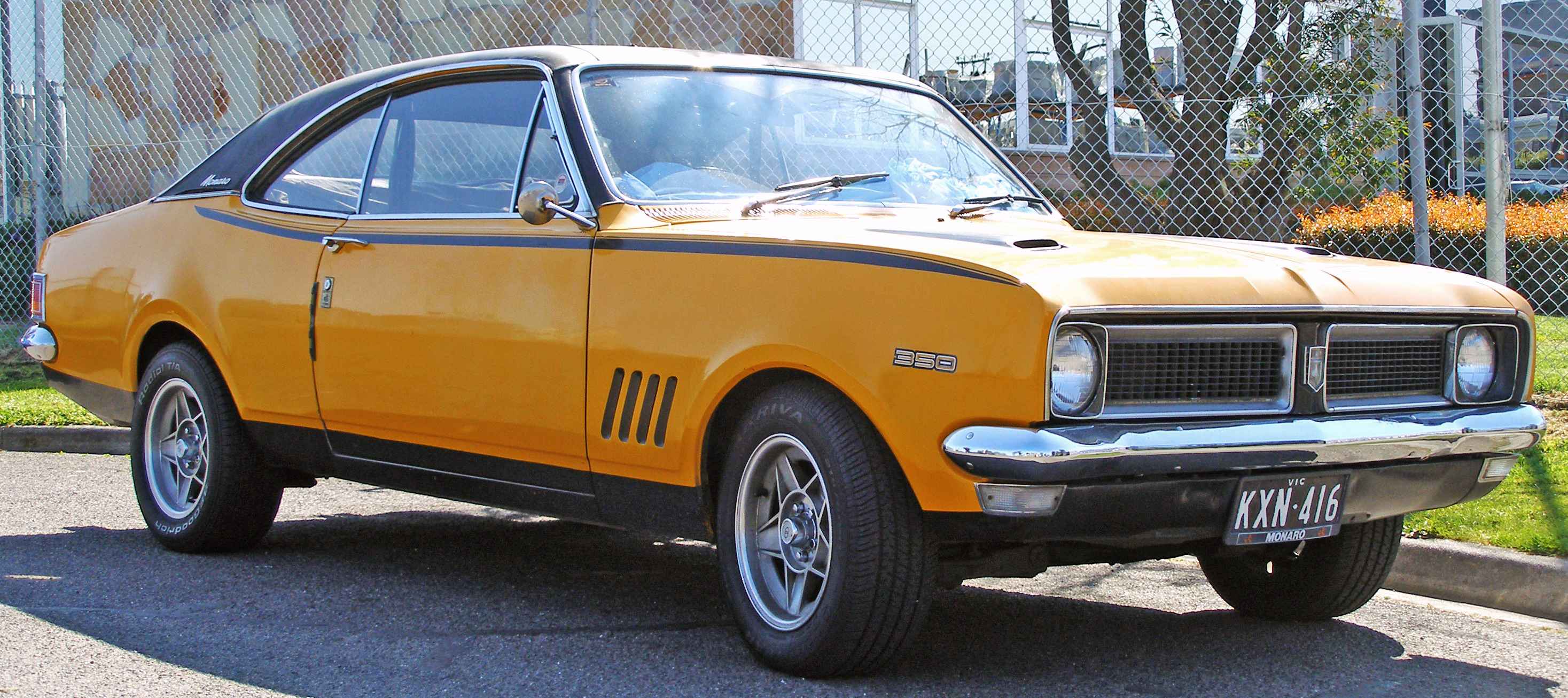
1970 Holden HG Monaro GTS 350

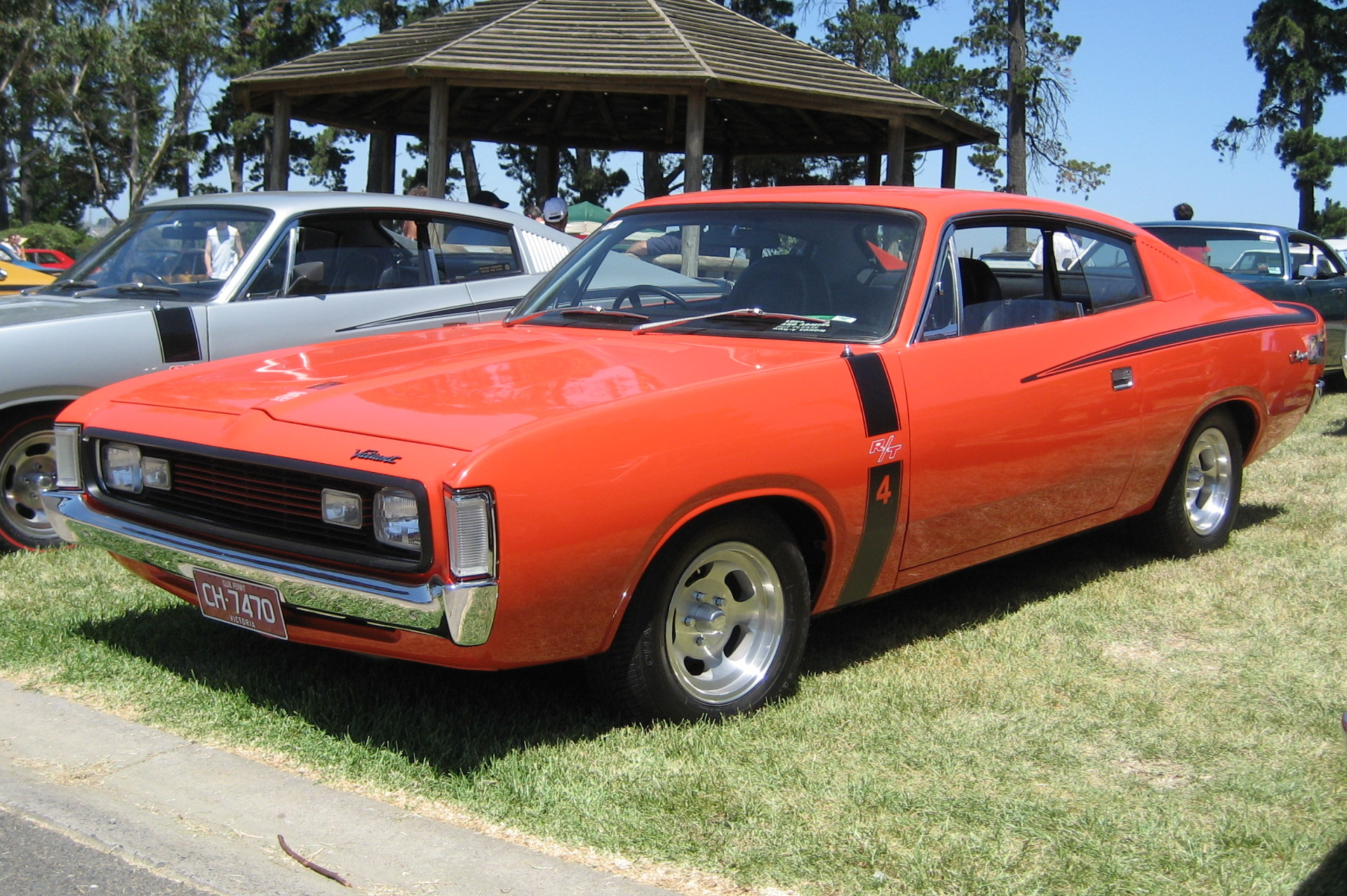
1971 Chrysler VH Valiant Charger

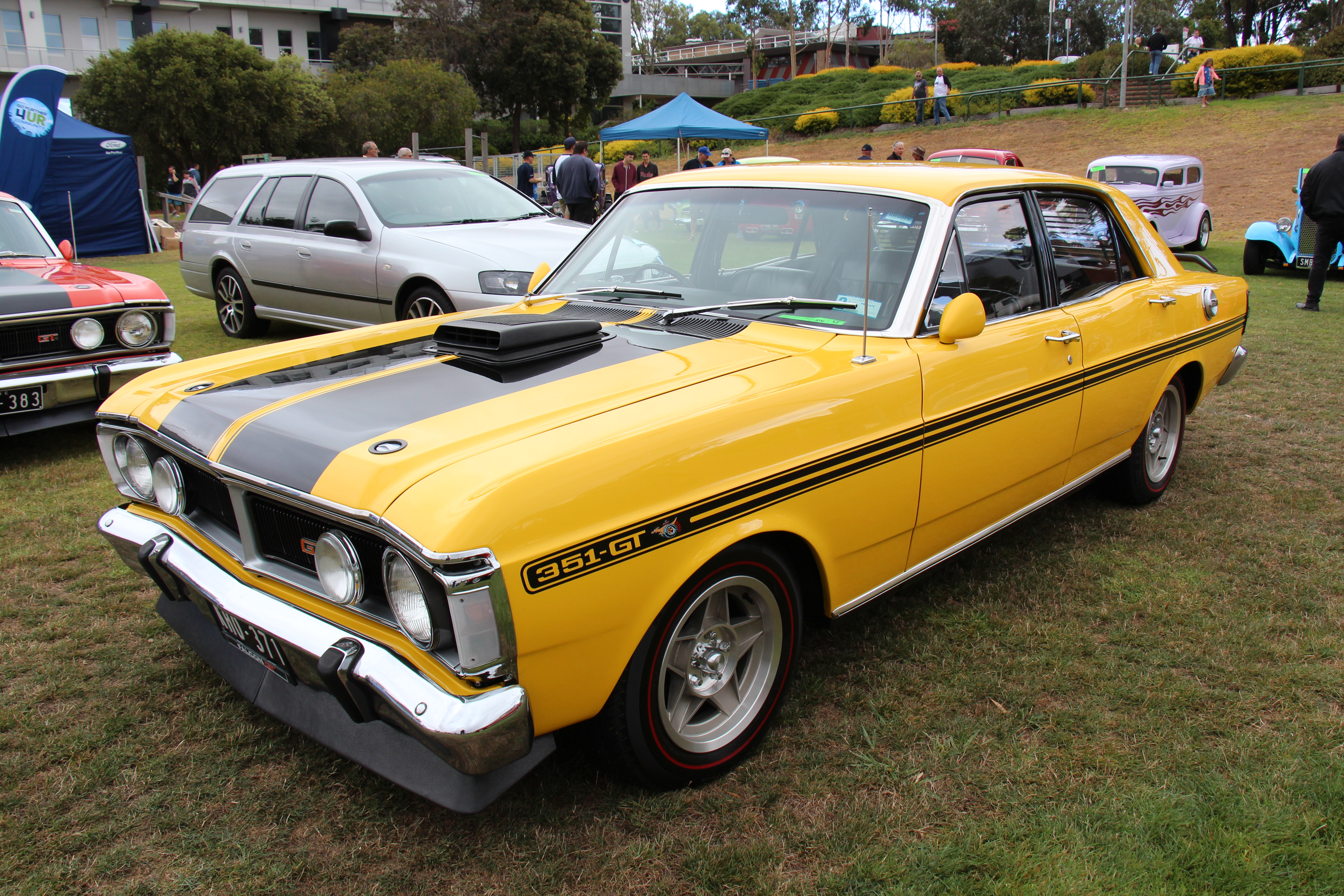
1972 Ford XY Falcon GTHO

=== Origins ===
The first Australian-designed car to be marketed as a performance model was the 1963 Holden EH S4 model, of which 120 road cars were produced to homologate it for the 1963 Armstrong 500 motor race at Bathurst. The EH S4 was powered by an upgraded version of the standard six-cylinder engine, enlarged to 2.9 L (179 cu in) and producing 90 kW (121 bhp). In 1964, the Ford Falcon (XM) became available with an enlarged 3.3 L (200 cu in) "Super Pursuit" version of the standard six-cylinder engine, which produced 90 kW (121 bhp).

In 1965, the Chrysler Valiant AP6 became the first Australian car to be available with a V8 engine. This optional engine was the 4.5 L (273 cu in) version of the Chrysler LA engine, which produced 135 kW (181 bhp) and was imported from the United States. The first Australian-designed Ford to be available with a V8 was the 1966 Ford Falcon (XR), with a 4.7 L (289 cu in) version of the Ford Windsor engine (imported from the United States), which produced 149 kW (200 bhp). The first Holden to be available with a V8 was the 1968 Holden HK, with a 5.0 L (307 cu in) version of the Chevrolet small-block V8 (imported from the United States) which produced 157 kW (210 bhp). Later that year, a 5.4 L (327 cu in) version of the engine became available in the Holden HK Monaro GTS 327 coupe.

The pinnacle of 1970s Australian muscle cars were the 1971–1972 Ford Falcon GTHO, Holden Monaro 350, and Chrysler Valiant Charger R/T (the smaller Holden Torana GTR was also a successful performance car of the era, but it is not considered a muscle car due to its prioritization of lighter weight over outright power output). The Ford Falcon (XY) GTHO Phase III model was powered by a 5.8 L (351 cu in) version of the Ford Cleveland V8 engine, officially rated at 224 kW (300 bhp), but estimated to produce between 261–283 kW (350–380 bhp). The Holden HQ Monaro GTS 350 was powered by a 5.7 L (350 cu in) version of the Chevrolet small-block V8 producing 205 kW (275 bhp). The Chrysler Valiant Charger R/T E49 model was powered by a 4.3 L (265 cu in) version of the Chrysler Hemi-6 six-cylinder engine producing 225 kW (302 bhp).

=== Supercar scare ===
In 1972, the production of Australian muscle cars saw a setback when the supercar scare caused Ford, Holden, and Chrysler to cease development of upcoming performance models, due to government pressure. The Australian muscle car models produced during the 1970s later consisted of the limited production 1977–1978 Holden Torana (LX) A9X option and the 1978–1979 Ford Falcon (XC) Cobra model, both created as homologation models for Group C touring car racing. These were less powerful than their predecessors.

Brands still offered high-performance models with V8 variants throughout the 1980s, but these vehicles were low production and were generally underpowered compared to their late 1960s and 1970s predecessors. An example was the Ford Falcon (XD), which was available with a 5.8 L V8 engine. Subsequent generations of the Ford Falcon would not have any V8 options available until 1992, when the EB XR8 was introduced. The Holden Commodore debuted in 1978. However, a renaissance in muscle cars would be sparked by factory-backed aftermarket operations. Holden Dealer Team would release high-performance models of the Holden Commodore throughout the 1980s, such as the HDT Group A, which would become iconic for its blue paintwork. In 1988, Ford released the Ford Falcon (EB), which was available with a V8 in a 25th anniversary special model celebrating the original Ford Falcon GT.

== Argentina ==
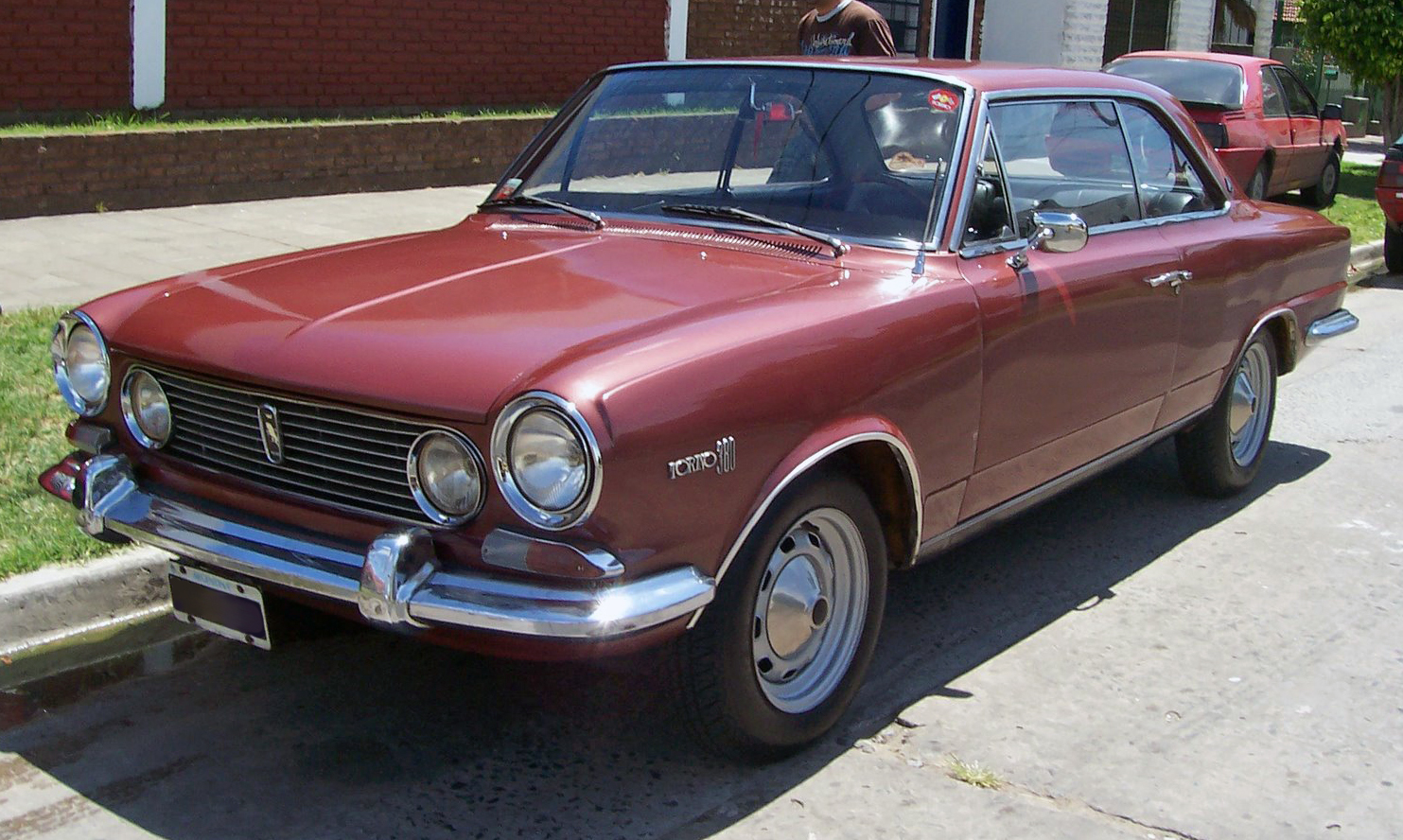
1966–1970 IKA-Renault Torino

In Argentina, local subsidiaries General Motors and Chrysler produced two acclaimed models of muscle cars, commercialising them under the Chevrolet and Dodge brands respectively. The first was the producer of the third American generation of the Chevrolet Nova, which in this country was renamed "Chevy". This model was initially presented in a 4-door sedan version that maintained many physical features of the Nova coupe version, which would also be produced and marketed in Argentina a few years later.

On the other hand, Chrysler Fevre produced a series of vehicles based on the fourth generation of the Dodge Dart that received the name of "Línea Dodge" (Dodge Line). This vehicle presented sedan and coupe versions, which in turn were a local redesign of the Dart model and which, depending on its level of equipment, received different names (Polara, Coronado, RT, and GTX).

In return for these brands, both Ford Argentina and the national producer Industrias Kaiser Argentina ("IKA") would respond with the production of two high-performance sedans, such as the Argentine version of the Ford Falcon and a derivative of the AMC's Rambler American model, called Torino, which, in addition to its sedan version, would present a coupe version which would end up being acclaimed and popularized in the Argentine automotive field. Production of the Torino would be resumed by Renault Argentina after it took over IKA in the 1970s.

== Lists of muscle cars (1962–1974) ==
According to Car and Driver, January 1990:

- 1964–1969 Pontiac GTO
- 1966–1971 Plymouth/Dodge A-body 426 models
- 1966–1967 Chevrolet Chevy II / Nova SS 327
- 1966–1969 Chevrolet Chevelle SS 396
- 1968–1969 Chevrolet Chevy II / Nova SS 396
- 1969 Ford Torino Cobra 428
- 1969 Plymouth Road Runner 440 Six Pack
- 1969 Dodge Super Bee 440 Six Pack
- 1969 Chevrolet Camaro ZL1
- 1970 Chevrolet Chevelle SS 454

According to CNBC, April 2013:

- 1968 Shelby Mustang GT500KR
- 1969 Ford Mustang Boss 429
- 1969 Dodge Charger Daytona Hemi
- 1969 Chevrolet Camaro ZL1
- 1970 Oldsmobile 442 W-30
- 1970 Buick GSX Stage 1
- 1970 Chevrolet Chevelle SS 454 LS6
- 1970 Pontiac GTO Judge Ram Air IV
- 1971 Plymouth Hemi 'Cuda
- 1974 Pontiac Firebird Trans Am SD455

According to Road & Track, January 2021:

- 1962 Pontiac Catalina Super Duty
- 1963 Studebaker Super Lark
- 1963 Chevrolet Impala Z11
- 1964 Ford Fairlane Thunderbolt
- 1967 Dodge Coronet W023
- 1968 Hurst Hemi Dart L023
- 1969 Chevrolet Camaro ZL1
- 1969–1970 Ford Mustang Boss 429
- 1970 Buick GSX Stage 1
- 1970 AMC "The Machine"
- 1970 Plymouth Hemi 'Cuda Super Track Pack
- 1971 Ford Mustang Mach 1 Drag Pack

According to Motor Trend, June 2023:

- 1962 Pontiac Catalina Super Duty
- 1963 Plymouth Savoy Max Wedge
- 1964 Ford Fairlane Thunderbolt
- 1965 Pontiac GTO Tri-Power
- 1966 Dodge Coronet Street Hemi
- 1968 AMC AMX
- 1969 Chevrolet Camaro COPO 427
- 1969 Ford Mustang Boss 429
- 1969 Dodge Charger Daytona Hemi
- 1970 Chevrolet Chevelle SS 454

== See also ==
- Sport compact
- Supercar
- Pony car
