= Total Performance =

Advertising campaign by Ford Motor Company

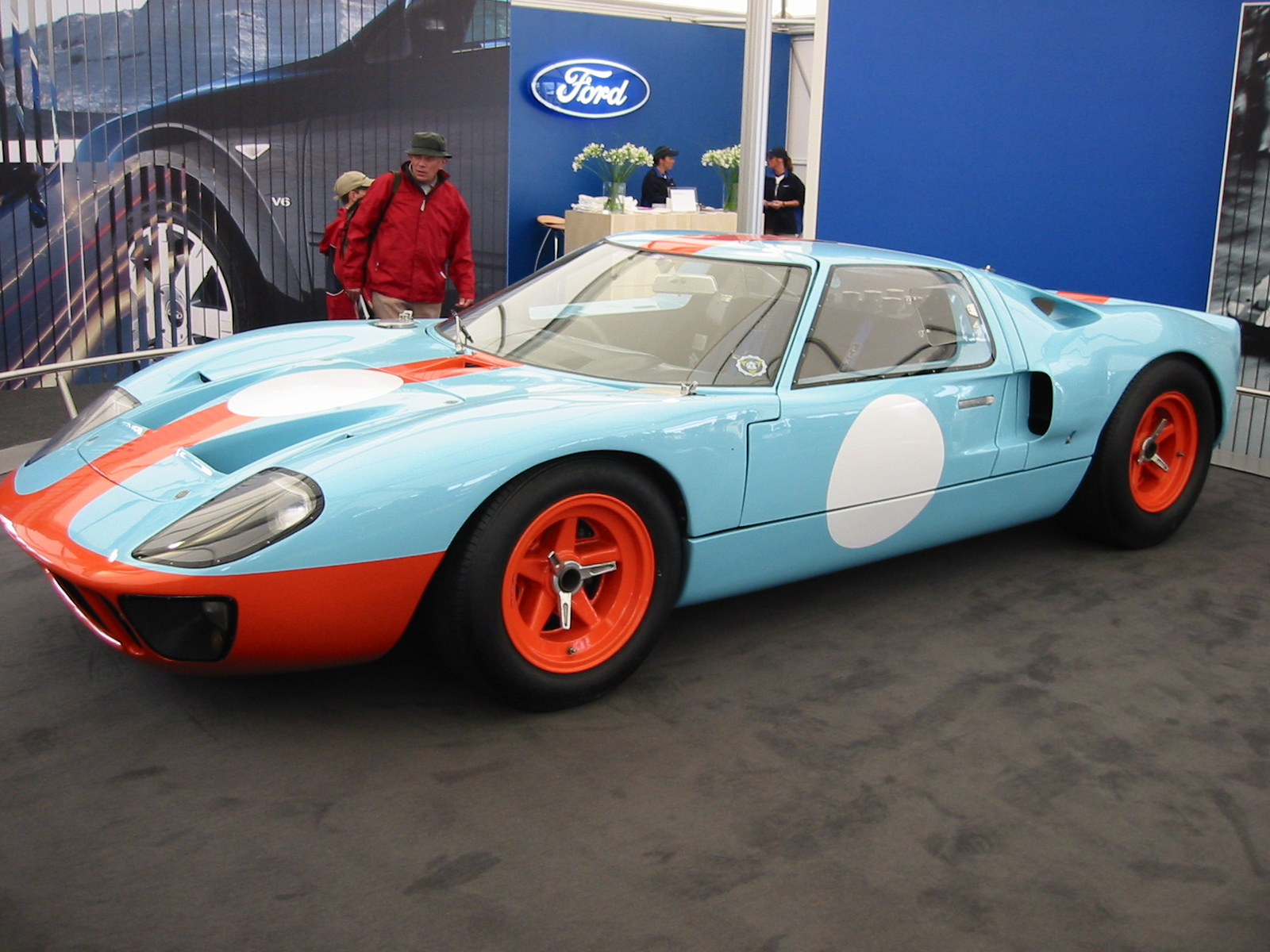
Ford GT40

Total Performance was a global promotional advertising campaign conducted by the Ford Motor Company during the 1960s. It aimed to succeed in a variety of motorsport venues, and then emphasize performance in their mainstream vehicles with the interest generated.

== Motorsport ==
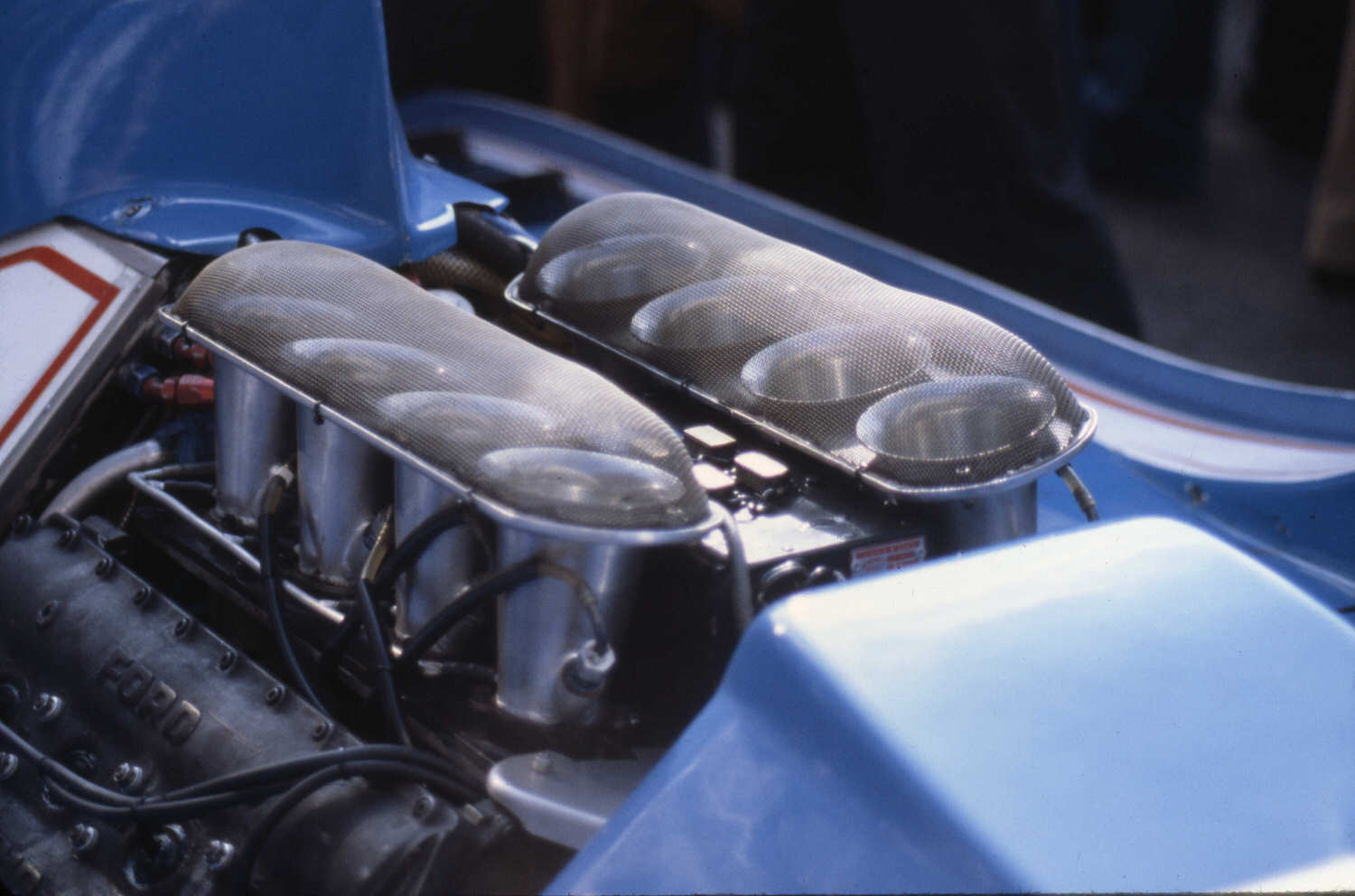
Cosworth DFV

The cream of Ford's efforts came on the race track and drag strip, which lent credence to the premise of their campaign. The Ford GT40 won overall in 24 Hours of Le Mans in 1966, 1967, 1968, and 1969, and chalked up numerous victories in other endurance races such as the 12 Hours of Sebring and 24 Hours of Daytona. Legendary engines, like the big-block Ford 427 engine, and the Ford-sponsored Cosworth DFV were products of this era. Ford engines powered hundreds of victories in Formula One, NASCAR, CART, and other racing series. Ford-powered Lolas raced in the Can-Am series, and other Ford vehicles (most especially the Ford Escort) were successful in rallying.

== Design changes ==
The Ford Fairlane, Ford Falcon, and Ford Galaxie were stylistically modified in line with the performance image in the 1960s, given squared-off and more aggressive looks. The Ford Mustang, designed to look sporty in stock form, was given performance potential with the creation of in-house Ford designs such as the Boss 302 Mustang, Boss 429, as well as the Shelby Mustangs.

== Production race cars ==
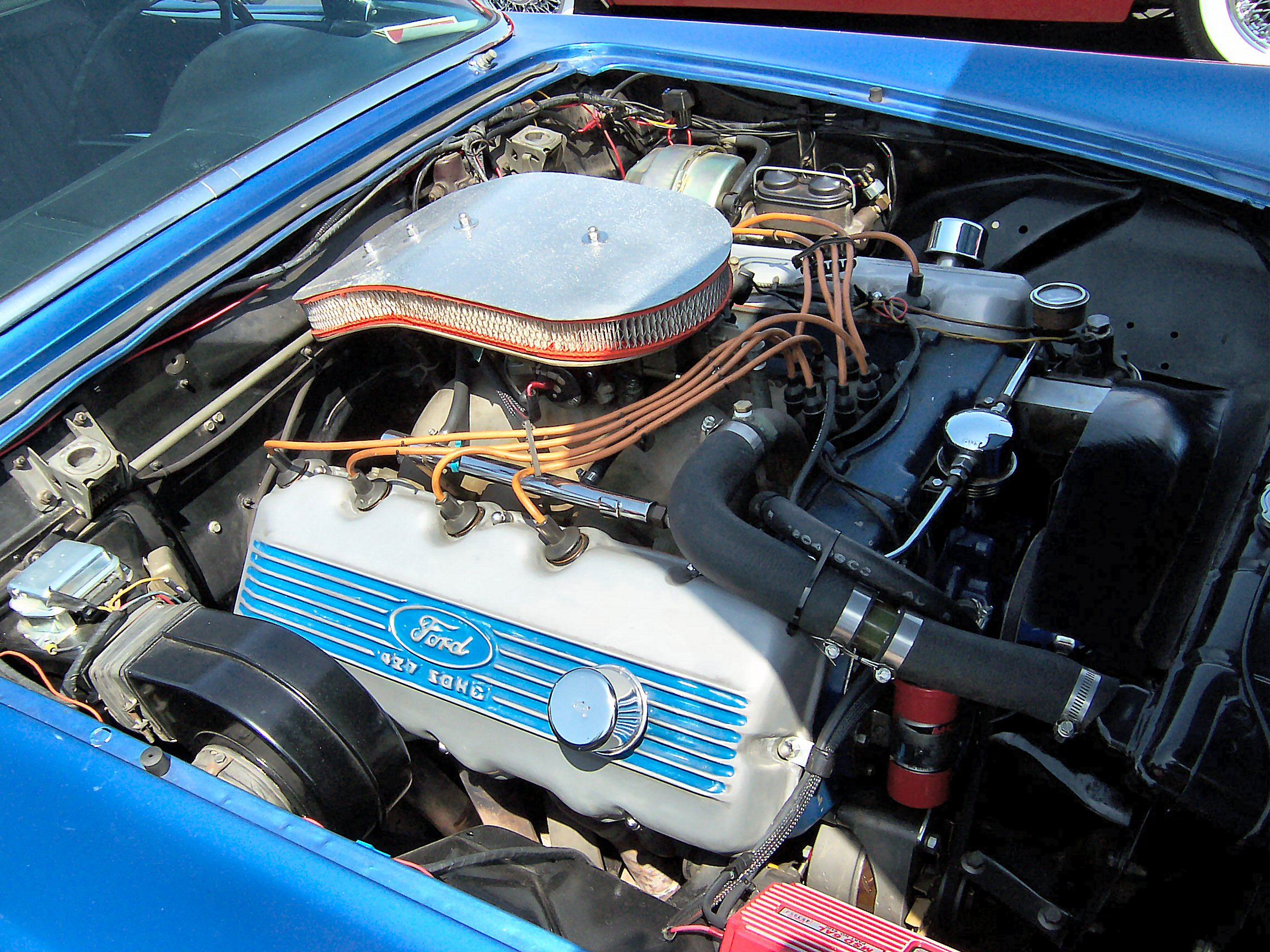
Ford 427 SOHC engine

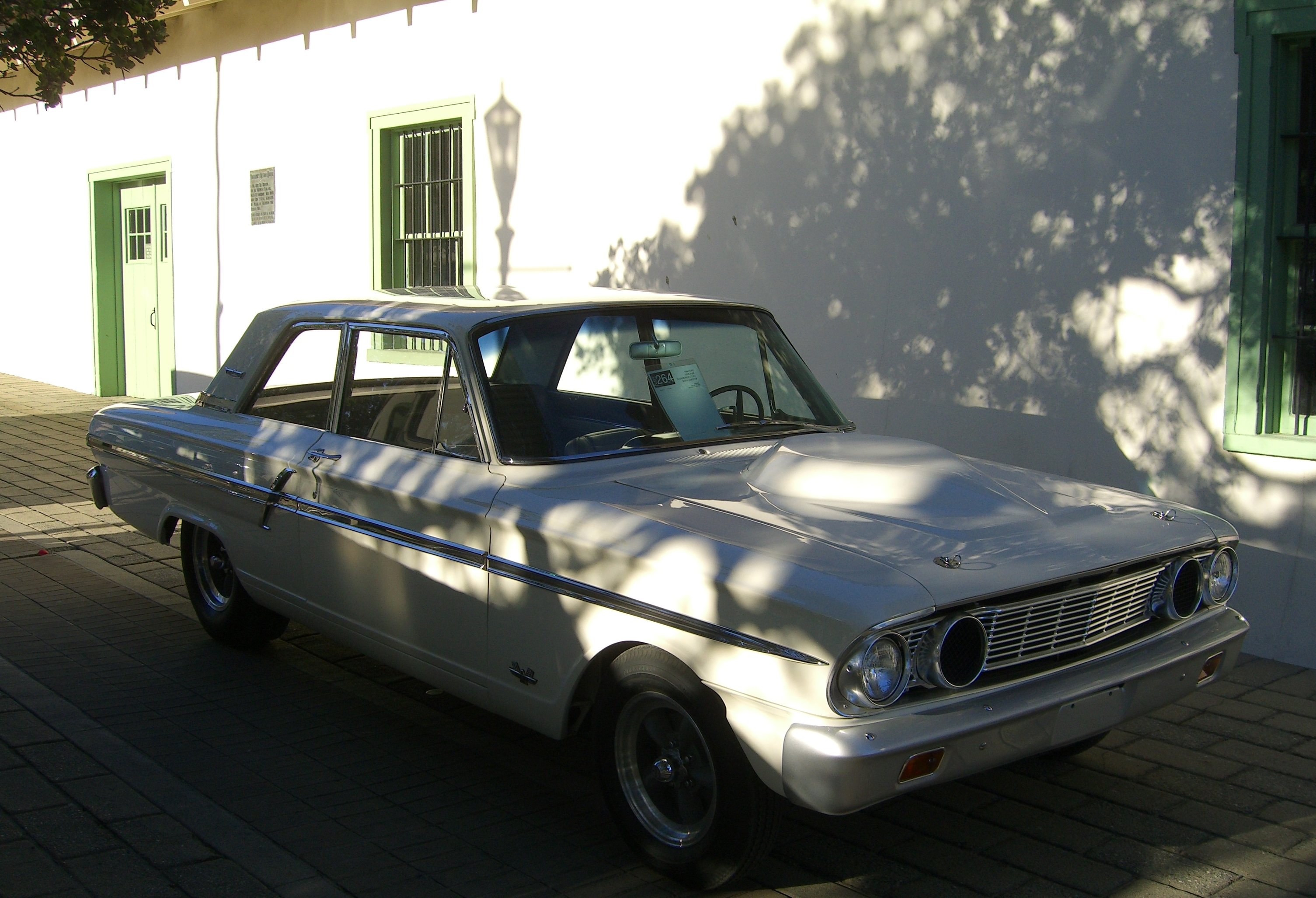
Ford Thunderbolt

Though in very small numbers, race cars were often modified for road use by Ford, either out of demand or for necessary homologation. The Ford 427 engine was available in special versions of the Galaxie and Fairlane. The Fairlane version was known as the Ford Thunderbolt. The Thunderbolt was a drag racing only car built buy Ford that weighed in around 3,000lbs and was capable of running mid 8s to low 9 second 1/4 miles with modern tires. Versions of the Ford GT40 were built and sold for roadgoing use, and in kit car form they continue to be produced to this day. Modern cars like the Ford GT and Shelby GT500 are said to be the heirs to 1960s performance machines.

== The end ==
The Total Performance strategy was obsolete by the early 1970s. Though racing and performance promotions were conducted on a world scale, the fortunes of the strategy was mostly tied to the sale of muscle cars. With fuel economy, emissions cleanliness, and lower automobile insurance costs as new and overriding consumer demands, performance was quickly de-emphasized.
