= Drag Pack =

Drag Pack was Ford Motor Company's marketing name for an option package that included a remote mounted oil cooler and higher ratio rear axle gear (plus engine components on some models). It was available in the United States for some of its car models. This option appeared on the invoice as Drag Pack, Super Drag Pack, Drag Pak, or Super Drag Pak (the spelling "Pak" was used by the Lincoln/Mercury division of Ford). The exception was a factory-equipped Boss 302 Mustang with the Drag Pack option, which was not marketed by Ford as such, or by any other name.

At the start of the 1970 model year, Ford began installing the Drag Pack on approximately 10% of Boss 302 Mustangs. For those who were aware of it, this free Drag Pack upgrade was available simply by ordering a 4.30 rear axle ratio. The exceptions were two early production vehicles with 3.91 axle ratio (special factory orders that received the oil cooler), and two 4.30 axle ratio vehicles (which reportedly did not receive their intended oil cooler, possibly the result of a supply problem). The 4.30 axle ratio exceptions are insignificant in terms of establishing a meaningful pattern, as they represent a normal (1970) production line margin of error.
