= Ford MEL engine =

Ford MEL V8

Overview
- Manufacturer: Ford Motor Company
- Also called: Marauder V8, E-475
- Production: 1958–1967

Layout
- Configuration: Big-block 90° V8
- Displacement: 383–462 cu in (6.3–7.6 L)
- Cylinder bore: 106.7 mm (4.20 in); 109.2 mm (4.30 in); 111.3 mm (4.38 in)
- Piston stroke: 83.8 mm (3.30 in); 94.0 mm (3.70 in); 97.3 mm (3.83 in)
- Valvetrain: OHV 2 valves x cyl.
- Compression ratio: 10.1:1-10.5:1

Combustion
- Supercharger: On 1959 Lincoln-powered dragster only
- Fuel system: Holley, Carter AFB, or Ford Autolite carburetors
- Fuel type: Gasoline
- Cooling system: Water-cooled

Output
- Power output: 280–400 hp (209–298 kW)
- Torque output: 475–485 lb⋅ft (644–658 N⋅m)

Chronology
- Predecessor: Lincoln Y-block V8
- Successor: Ford 385 V8

The Ford MEL is a big-block 90° V8 engine family produced in various configurations by the Ford Motor Company between 1958 and 1967 in displacements from 383–462 cubic inches (6.3–7.6 L), and used in Ford, Edsel, Mercury, and Lincoln vehicles.

The MEL (for Mercury-Edsel-Lincoln) began as the replacement for the Lincoln Y-block V8 engine for use in large passenger cars. These engines were produced in Lima, Ohio at Ford's Lima Engine plant. The MEL was in turn replaced by the Ford 385 series engine.

== Overview ==
All MEL engines had wedge-shaped combustion chambers formed between a flat head surface and an angle milled block deck (10 degrees off square with the bore axis), with the piston top determining the compression ratio and combustion chamber shape, similar to the Chevrolet Big-Block 348 combustion chamber, also introduced in 1958, and the later 409 and 427. Unlike the Chevrolet, which had staggered valves and scalloped or M-shaped valve covers, the MEL valves were inline with shaft mounted rocker arms like the FE model Ford engines which were introduced at the same time. As with the previous generation V8s, an open runner intake manifold was used, requiring the use of a stamped steel lifter valley cover similar to that of the Pontiac V8 engines. Also, the intake manifold provided no exhaust crossover passage to warm the air-fuel mixture. Further MEL engines employed two individual thermostats, aimed to improve the regulation of the engine's coolant temperature. It was introduced the same year Chrysler phased out the Hemi V8 for the Chrysler B engine which was also a wedge-shaped combustion chamber.

The MEL bore some mechanical similarities with the Ford FE, using similar components such as the oiling system, bolt patterns, and valve stems; however, the MEL was a Lincoln-specific engine and was even larger in displacement capacity. The main bearings were 73.66 mm (2.900 in), while the rod bearings were 66.04 mm (2.600 in). The connecting rod beam had a unique triangular shape with the shoulders for the bolts sitting low toward the cap mating surface 1/2 in (13 mm). There was one major difference between the MEL and FE engines besides their size and weight; the valves on MEL engines were arranged in alternating fashion (I-E-I-E-I-E-I-E) and not in the manner of the FE (E-I-E-I-I-E-I-E) where the I indicates an intake valve and the E indicates an exhaust valve.

The MEL was one of three new engine families introduced by Lincoln and Ford in 1958. The others were the FE (Ford Edsel) and SD (super duty), the latter being large and extra powerful, slow-revving engines engineered for heavy-duty work trucks. The FE engine saw its use in the Edsel, a model which was introduced to the vehicle lineup by Ford, described as a car which blended design features of the Ford and Mercury lines combining them with its own individual styling. Further several new Lincoln vehicles, such as the Continental luxury sedan and coupe, as well as the all-new four-seat Thunderbird of the same year, were brought to market with the new engines.

== 383 ==
The 383 cu in (6.3 L; 6,282 cc) Marauder was the smallest member of the family. Produced from 1958 through 1960, it was only used in Mercury vehicles. It used a 4.30 in × 3.30 in (109.2 mm × 83.8 mm) bore and stroke. Output began at 312 or 330 hp (233 or 246 kW), both with a four-barrel carburetor. The 322 hp (240 kW) was the only output for 1959, and power dropped to 280 hp (209 kW) for the final year.

== 410 ==
The 410 cu in (6.7 L; 6,720 cc) E-475 was the only engine offered in the 1958 Edsel Citation and Corsair models. It was rated at 345 hp (257 kW) and 475 lb⋅ft (644 N⋅m). Bore and stroke were 4.20 and 3.70 inches (106.7 and 94.0 mm) respectively. It was not an option on the Pacer, Ranger or station wagon models, which exclusively used the FE 361 engine.

There were no other Ford Motor Company applications for this engine. In 1965, Ford produced a 410 version of the FE engine that was exclusive to Mercury, but it is an unrelated design.

== 430 ==
The 430 cu in (7.0 L; 7,044 cc) engine was produced from 1958 through 1965, and used in Ford, Mercury, and Lincoln products. It was the standard engine on all 1958 to 1960 Lincolns and Continentals. Power was 375 hp (280 kW) in 1958, 350 hp (261 kW) in 1959, 315 hp (235 kW) in 1960, 325 hp (242 kW) in 1961 and 340 hp (254 kW) in 1964. It was an optional engine on all Mercurys from 1958 to 1960 but Mercury models horsepower ratings were slightly less than the Lincolns and Continentals. The 430 was also an optional engine in 1959 and 1960 Ford Thunderbirds. It was commonly referred to as the Thunderbird 430 Special. The 1958 Super Marauder version used three Holley 2300 two-barrel carburetors to generate 400 hp (298 kW), the first American production car to reach this figure. It was an option on all 430 equipped 1958 Mercurys and all 1958 Lincolns and Continentals. The 430 had a 4.30 inches (109.2 mm) bore (same as the 383) and shared the 3.70 inches (94.0 mm) stroke of the 410.

The compression ratio started at 10.5:1 for 360 hp (268 kW), 375 hp (280 kW), and 400 hp (298 kW), but was reduced to 10.0:1 the following year. These 1959 engines produced 345–350 hp (257–261 kW), but power was down to 315 hp (235 kW) for 1960.

Some 1958 Continental Mark IIIs came brand new with the Holley 4150 four-barrel carburetor. New pistons and a four-barrel carburetor were added for 1963; the 10.1:1 compression brought output back to 345 hp (257 kW).

One of the later installations of the 430 was in the fourth-generation 1961-65 Lincoln Continental. The subsequent bored and stroked 462 cu in MEL was installed in 1966-68 Continentals; however, during the 1968 run, Ford’s lighter new 460 cu in (7.5 L) 385-series "Lima" engine was phased-in and replaced the MEL, which was discontinued entirely.

== 462 ==
The 430 was replaced by the 462 cu in (7.6 L; 7,565 cc) engine in 1966. Bore and stroke were entirely different at 4.38 and 3.83 inches (111.3 and 97.3 mm) and the 462 MEL engine produced 340 hp (254 kW) and as much as 485 lb⋅ft (658 N⋅m) of torque. This engine was fitted with hydraulic lifters and a four-barrel Carter AFB carburetor. This large, torquey engine was used only in Lincoln Continentals, from 1966 until mid-year in 1968 when it was replaced by the new lighter weight Ford 385-series 460 V8. Production ended after 1968, and production facilities in Lima were converted to produce the new engine family.

== Applications ==
- 1958: all Edsel Citation and Corsair models as standard equipment (410 only)
- 1958–1960: all Continental models Marks III, IV, V as standard equipment (430 only)
- 1958–1960: all Lincoln models as standard equipment (430 only)
- 1958–1960: all Mercury models as standard or optional equipment (383 and 430 only)
- 1959–1960: all Ford Thunderbird models as optional equipment (430 only)
- 1961–1965: all Lincoln Continental models as standard equipment (430 only)
- 1966–1968: all Lincoln Continental models as standard equipment (462 only)

== See also ==
- List of Ford engines
