= Lima Engine =

Ford Motor Company automobile engine plant in Lima, Ohio

Coordinates: 40°46′16.96″N 84°5′6.69″W

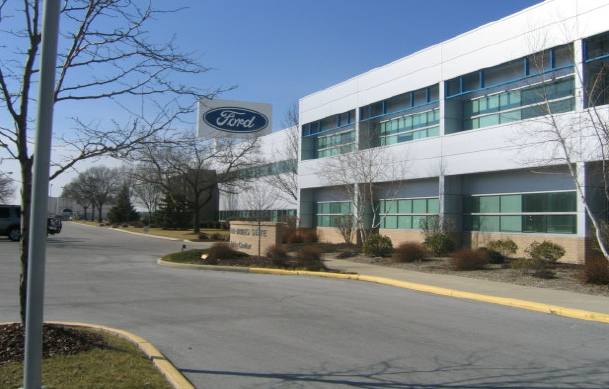
Lima Engine plant in 2007

Lima Engine is a Ford Motor Company automobile engine plant located in Lima, Ohio, United States.

== History ==
The factory opened in 1957 as the site of production of Ford's MEL V8 for the Edsel car.

It subsequently produced six-cylinder engines (the 170/200/250 family), the 385-series 370/429/460 big-block V8 engines, and the 2.3/2.5 L HSC/HSO pushrod four-cylinder engines for the Ford Tempo, Mercury Topaz, and Ford Taurus.

The plant also produced the namesake Lima 2.0/2.3/2.5 L OHC four-cylinder used in the Ford Pinto, Fairmont, Mustang, Thunderbird, Aerostar, Ranger, Mercury Capri, Mercury Cougar, Merkur XR4Ti, and 1993–2006 Mazda B-Series B2300/B2500 compact trucks.

== Current products ==
- 2.7 L EcoBoost Nano V6
- 3.0 L EcoBoost Nano V6
- 3.3 L Duratec 33 V6
- 3.5 L Duratec 35 V6
- 3.7 L Duratec 37 V6

== See also ==
- List of Ford factories
