= Hemispherical combustion chamber =

Dome-shaped combustion chamber within a cylinder head

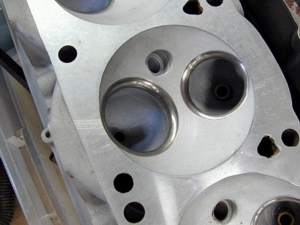
A hemispherical combustion chamber head, displaying the largest single intake and exhaust valves possible for a given engine bore diameter

A hemispherical combustion chamber is a combustion chamber in the cylinder head of an internal combustion engine with a domed "hemispheric" shape. An engine featuring this type of hemispherical chamber is known as a hemi engine. In practice, shapes less than a full hemisphere are typically employed, as are variations (or faceting in parts) of a true hemispheric profile. The primary advantage of such shapes are increased compression (leading to greater power) and very large intake and exhaust valves (allowing better flow of intake and exhaust gasses, also resulting in improved volumetric efficiency and greater power); the primary disadvantages are complex valve trains (caused by valves being placed opposite one-another in a head) and expense (of machining the heads and pistons, and additional valve train components).

While hemispherical combustion chambers are still found in the 2000s multi-valve arrangements (of four and even five valves per cylinder) and the popularity of overhead cam (including double overhead cam) arrangements have altered the traditional trade-offs in employing "hemi heads".

== History ==
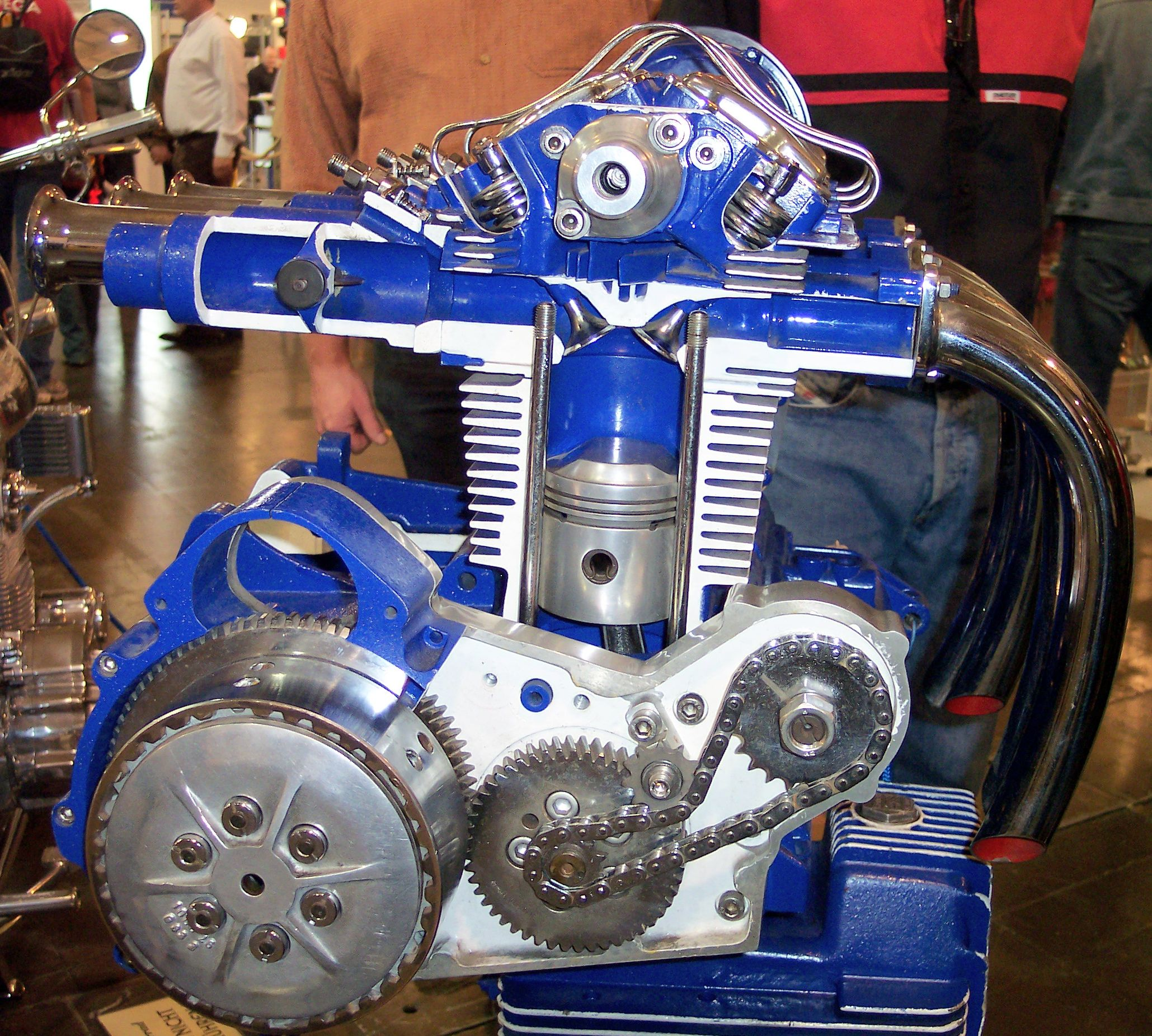
Sectioned motorcycle engine, with hemispherical head

Hemispherical combustion chambers were introduced on some of the earliest automotive engines, shortly after the viability of the internal combustion engine was first demonstrated. Their name reflects the domed recess in a cylinder head and correspondingly shaped top of a piston enclosing a space that approximates a half of a sphere (hemi- + -sphere + -ical), although in practice the actual enclosed space is generally less than half.

Hemispherical cylinder heads have been used since at least 1901; they were used by the Belgian car maker Pipe in 1905 and by the 1907 Fiat 130 HP Grand Prix racer. The Peugeot Grand Prix car of 1912 and the Alfa Romeo Grand Prix car of 1914 were both four-valve engines, and Daimler and Riley were also using hemispherical combustion chambers at the time. Beginning in 1912, Stutz used four-valve engines, conceptually anticipating modern car engines. Other examples include the BMW double-pushrod design (adopted by Bristol Cars), the Peugeot 403, the Toyota T engine and Toyota V engine (Toyota's first V8 engine), Miller racing engines, and the Jaguar XK engine.

== Technology and implementation ==
A hemispherical head ("hemi-head") gives an efficient combustion chamber with minimal heat loss to the head, and allows for two large valves. However, a hemi-head usually allows no more than two valves per cylinder due to the difficulty in arranging the valve gear for four valves at diverging angles, and these large valves are necessarily heavier than those in a multi-valve engine of similar valve area, as well as generally requiring more valve lift. The intake and exhaust valves lie on opposite sides of the chamber and necessitate a "cross-flow" head design. Since the combustion chamber is virtually a hemisphere, a flat-topped piston yields a lower compression ratio unless a smaller chamber is utilized.

Significant challenges in the commercialization of engines utilizing hemispherical chambers revolved around the design of the valve actuation, and how to make it effective, efficient, and reliable at an acceptable cost, which normally requires the use of either a dual rocker system, or dual camshafts to operate the inlet and exhaust valves. Complexity was referenced early in Chrysler's development of their 1950s hemi engine: the head was referred to in company advertising as the Double Rocker head. Ford's CVH (Compound Valve Hemispherical) engine of the 1980s solved the problem by way of utilizing a complex geometry of the valve angle combined with a cam-in-head configuration that allowed hemispherical arranged valves to be operated by a single camshaft and without the need for two rocker shafts.

== Benefits and drawbacks ==
Although a wedge-head design offers simplified valve actuation, it usually does so by placing the valves side by side within the chamber, with parallel stem axes. This can restrict the flow of the intake and exhaust into and out of the chamber by limiting the diameters of valve heads to total no more than the bore of the cylinder in a two valve per cylinder arrangement. With a hemispherical chamber with splayed valve stem angle, this limitation is increased by the angle, making the total valve diameter size possible to exceed the bore size within an overhead valve configuration. See IOE engine for another method.

Also, the splayed valve angle causes the valve seat plane to be tilted, giving a straighter flow path for the intake and exhaust to/from the port exiting the cylinder head. Engineers have learned that while increasing the valve size with straighter port is beneficial for increasing the maximum power at high rpm, it slows the intake flow speed, not providing the best combustion event for emissions, efficiency, or power in the normal rpm range.

Domed pistons are commonly used to maintain a higher mechanical compression ratio, which tend to increase the flame propagation distance, being also detrimental to efficient combustion, unless the number of spark plugs per cylinder is increased.

Flame temperatures are very high, leading to excessive NOx output which may require exhaust gas recirculation and other emission control measures to meet modern standards. Other drawbacks of the hemispherical chamber include increased production cost and high relative weight (25% heavier than a comparable wedge head according to Chrysler's engineers). These had pushed the hemi head out of favor in the modern era, until Chrysler's 2003 redesign that has proven popular.

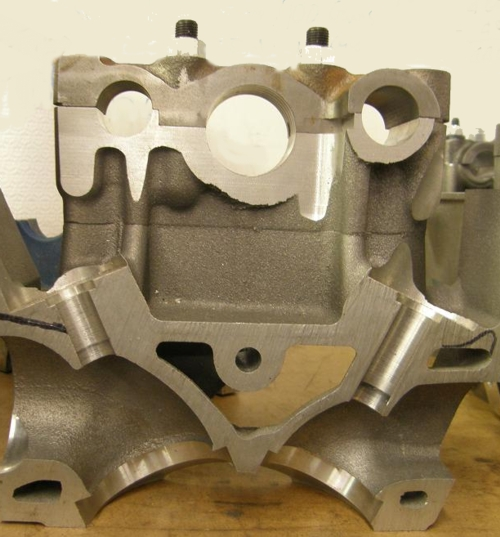

SOHC Cutaway showing cross-flow design,
hemispherical shape of the chamber,
center position of the overhead cam
with flanking supports for the rocker shafts.

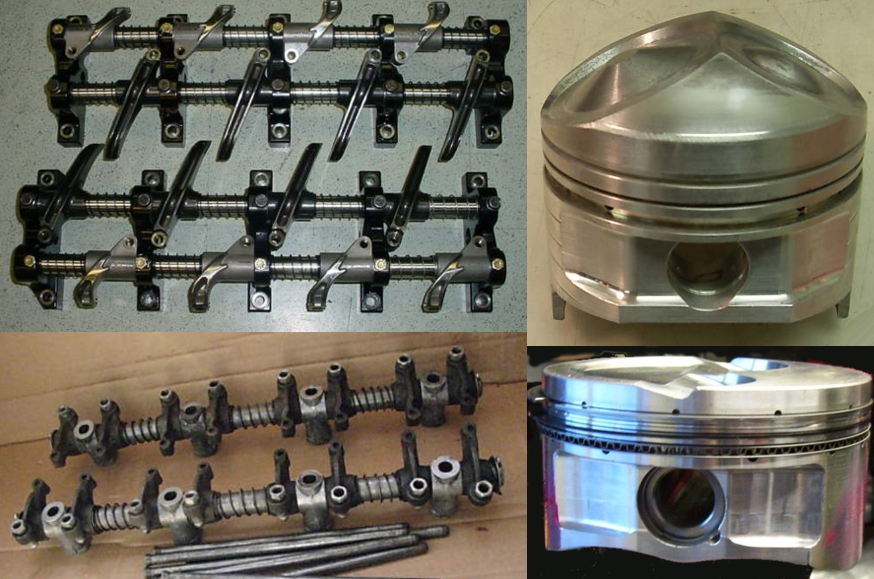

The hemi engine requires parts
of more complexity and quantities.
Upper photos of double rocker system
for a pair of Hemi heads
and its complex piston casting.
Lower photos of comparable parts for
a pair of Wedge Heads.

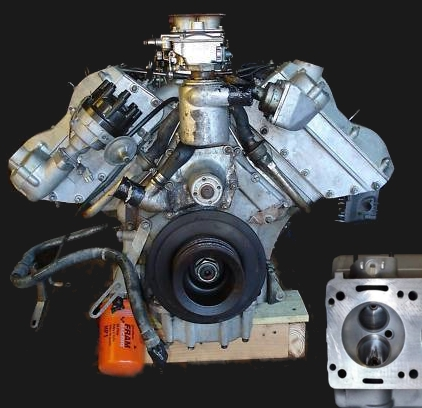

A major drawback of the hemi design is its large
head size relative to overall engine size.
The splayed valves necessary for the crossflow head
require a wider casting, which requires large engine bays.
Engineers are looking to reduce the physical size of engines
(while maintaining or increasing their power).

== Use ==
=== Alfa Romeo ===
Alfa Romeo has produced successful hemi-head engines throughout the years. Arguably one of their most beloved examples is Giuseppe Busso's original 2.5-liter V6, which has been cited by some as one of the best and most distinctive sounding production engines (even in its later 24v forms) of all time. Part of this praise is likely because the hemispherical heads on the original 2-valve engine allowed for an almost completely straight exhaust port, resulting in a less diluted or muddied engine sound, allowing Alfa Romeo to use quieter stock exhausts without losing much of their distinct and beloved race-bred engine noise.

=== Aston Martin ===
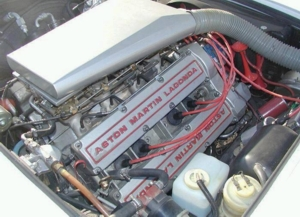
Aston Martin V8

Aston Martin's DOHC V8 used a hemispherical chamber during the late 1960s through to the late 1980s. Each of four cams controlled one set of valves per cylinder bank. The Aston Martin V8 5.3 L (5340 cc/325 in^{3}) produced 315 hp (235 kW) gross.

=== BMW ===
BMW became a worldwide marque on the strength of its responsive yet durable SOHC hemi-head inline-4 M10 engine, most famously made in a 2 L (122 cu in) displacement in its 2002 sports sedan of the 1960s and 1970s.

=== Chrysler ===
Perhaps the most widely known proponent of the hemispherical chamber design is the Chrysler Corporation. Chrysler became identified primarily by trademarking the "Hemi" name and then using it extensively in their advertising campaigns beginning in the 1960s. Chrysler has produced three generations of such engines: the Chrysler FirePower engine in the 1950s; the 426 Hemi, developed for NASCAR in 1964 and produced through the early 1970s; and the "new HEMI" from 2003 to 2024. The most recent rendition of the Chrysler "Hemi" engine uses part of an oblate spheroid (flattened sphere) for its head shape to improve combustion efficiency over a true hemispherical head.

=== Ford ===
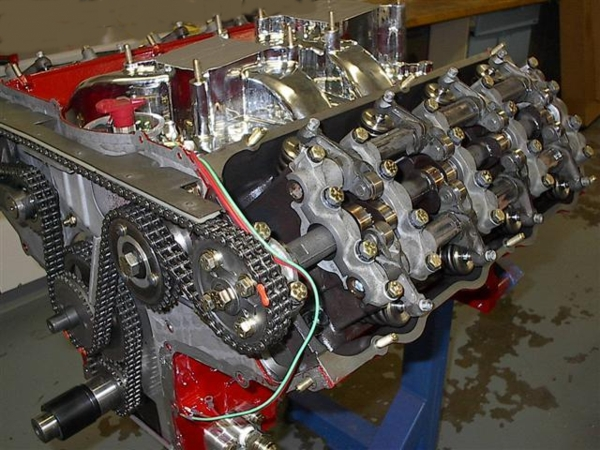
Massive valvetrain of Ford's 427 cu in/7.0 L SOHC hemi-head V8 Cammer, showing cam, rockers and timing chains

In 1964 Ford produced a single overhead cam 425 cu in FE-based hemi V8 known as the "427 SOHC "Cammer"". Designed in 90 days of intensive engineering effort for use in racing, it never appeared in a production Ford vehicle, instead being sold as an optional engine at Ford parts counters. Period dynamometer results claim the SOHC Hemi produced almost 700 hp (522 kW) in crate form (100 hp per liter). It used the side oiler engine block modified to replace an in-block cam with an idler shaft driving the distributor and oil pump, and accommodate other overhead camshaft issues. The overhead cams meant that it was not as rpm-limited as the Chrysler Hemis were with their pushrods and heavy and complex valvetrains.

Because of its power output, and the fact that Chrysler had shown NASCAR chief Bill France that a DOHC 426 Hemi was in the works, it was banned from NASCAR races, though allowed in certain drag racing classes.

Later Ford engine designs with hemispherical chambers included the Calliope, which used two in-block cams, arranged one over the other, to drive 3 valves per hemispherical chamber. The pushrods activating the valves from the top camshaft were almost horizontal. In 1968, Ford brought out the completely new 385-series engine family, which used a modified Semi-Hemi form of the hemispherical chamber.

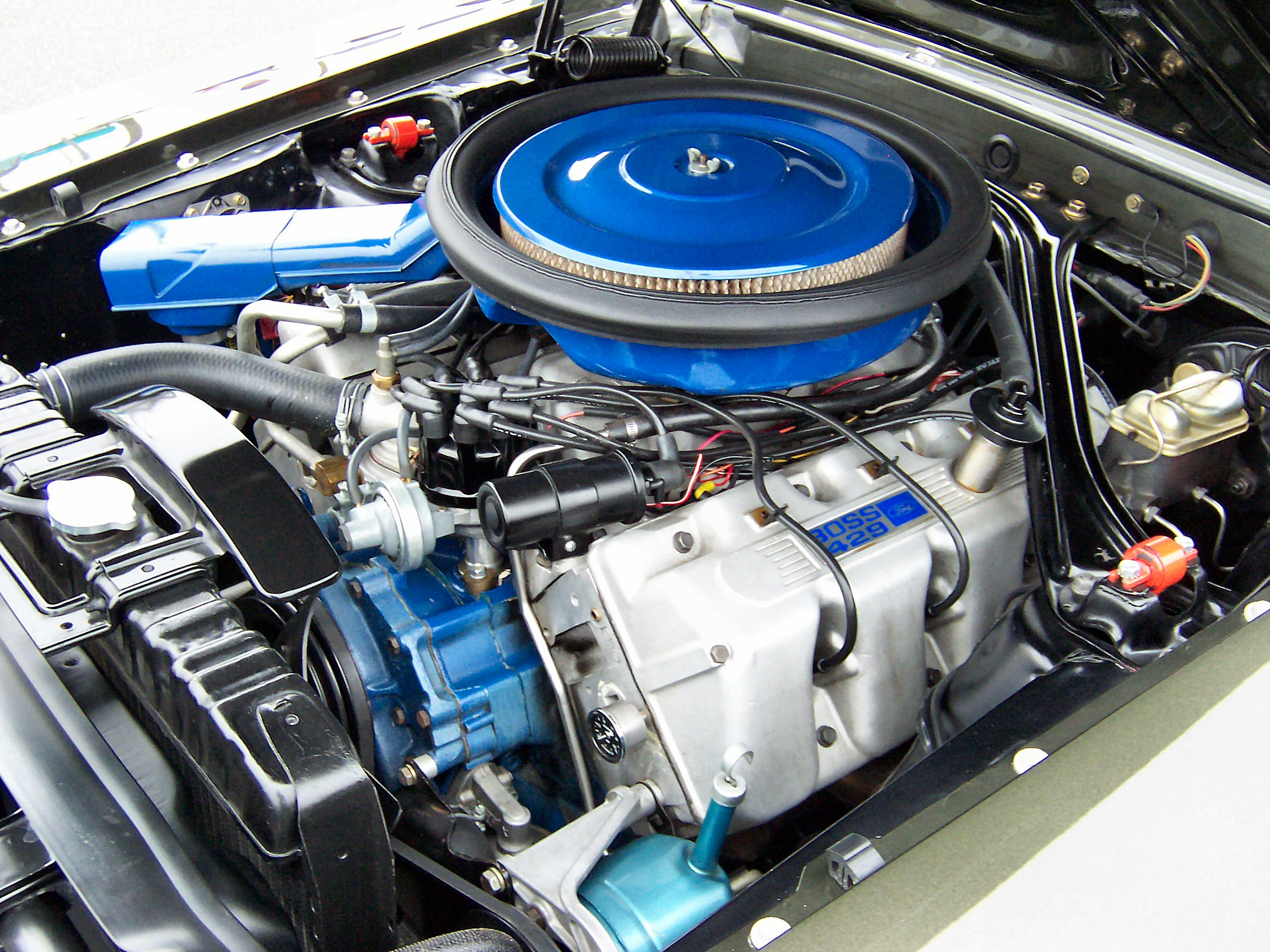
The distinctive enormous valve covers on a semi-hemispherical–head Boss 429 engine

In the 1970s, Ford designed and produced a small-block "Windsor" engine with hemispherical heads to address the growing concerns about fuel economy. Unfortunately, even with an ahead-of-its-time direct fuel injection system feeding a stratified charge chamber, the hemi's emissions could not be made clean enough for compliance with regulations. This plus the cost of the valve actuation systems, along with the cost of the high pressure pump needed to deliver fuel directly into the chamber, as well as the gilmer belt drive system needed to drive the pump, made further development pointless at the time.

Most 1980s 4-cylinder Fords used the Ford CVH engine, "CVH" meaning Compound Valve, Hemispherical (combustion chamber). Post 1986 the cylinder head of this engine was reworked to heart-shaped lean-burn combustion chambers, and used in low-performance models not benefiting from multipoint fuel injection - 1.4, 1.6, 1.8 in Europe, though was still referred to colloquially as the CVH.

=== Jaguar ===
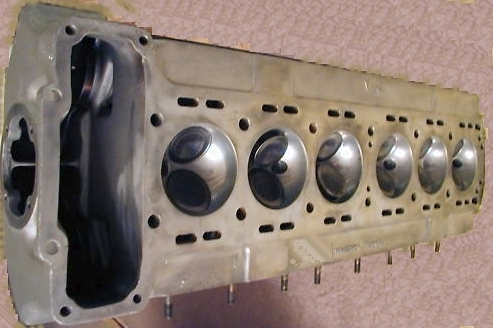
Jaguar in-line 6-cylinder hemi heads

The hemi-head Jaguar XK engine, introduced in 1949, powered cars ranging from the Le Mans winning D-Type to the XJ6.

=== Lamborghini ===
The Lamborghini V12, designed in 1963 and produced for more than 50 years, used hemispherical chambers.

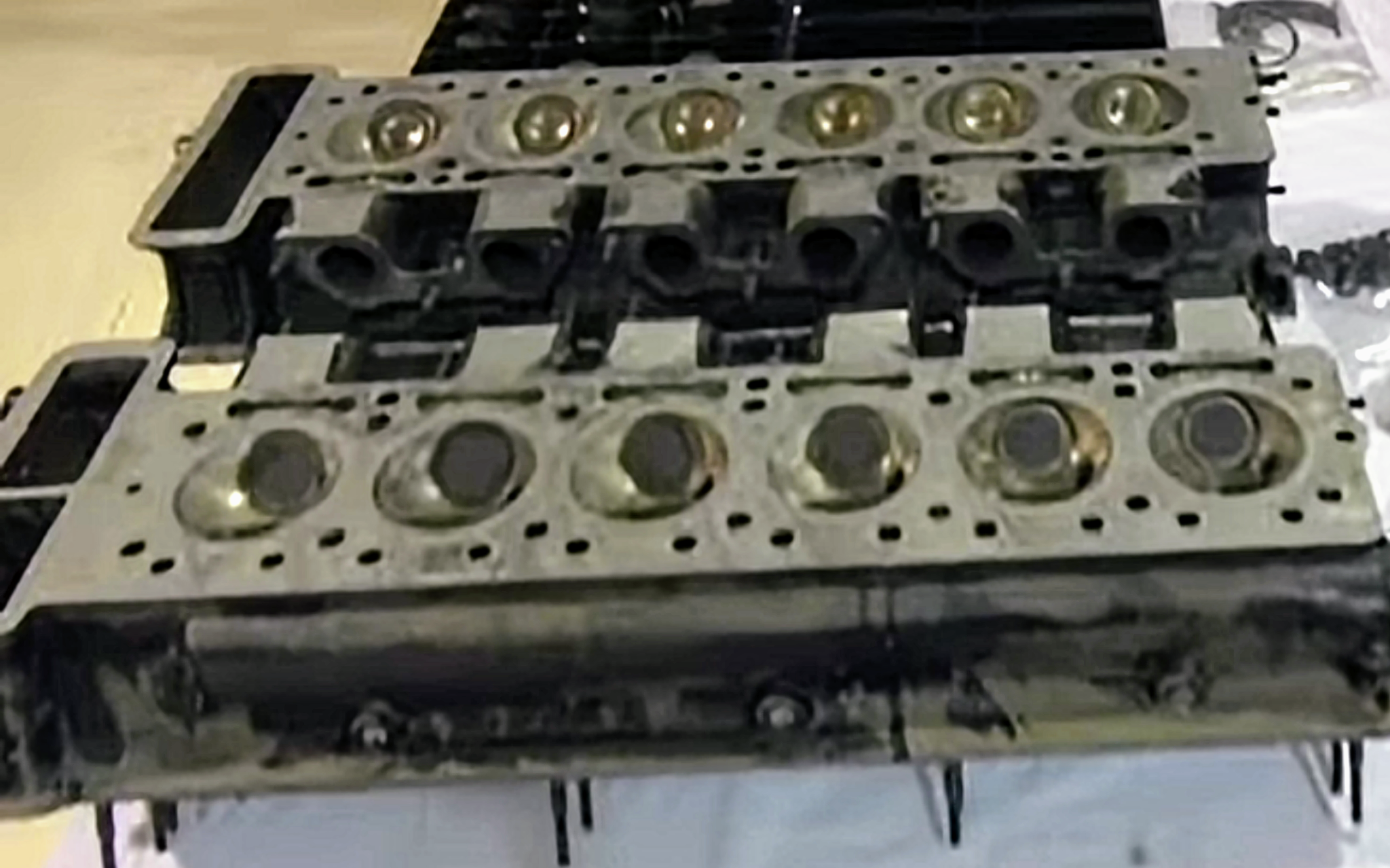
1970 3.9l Lamborghini V12 heads - from an S2 Espada

=== Lancia ===
The Lancia V4 and Lancia V6 engines both used hemispherical combustion chambers.

=== Lotus ===
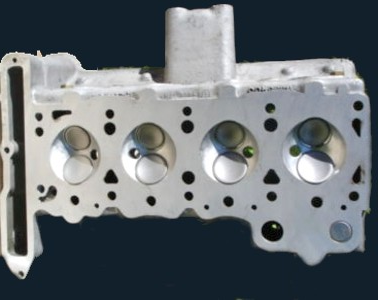
Lotus "big valve" head with hemispheric chambers

Lotus has used hemispherical chambers, as in the Lotus-Ford Twin Cam.

=== Mercedes Benz ===
Hemispherical chambers were a feature of the M102 engine introduced in 1980, which together with the crossflow head design promoted greater efficiency over the M115 engine it replaced.

=== MG ===
The MGA Twin-Cam was a variant of the pushrod MGA 1600 MkI MG MGA line from 1958 to 1960. The original pushrod 1588 cc cast iron block was fitted with a cast aluminum twin-cam two-valve cylinder head. Early versions proved fragile on the street and in competition due to pre-ignition (detonation), and oil loss, which led to decreasing the compression ratio from 9.1. to 8.3 with redesigned pistons. It was a successful update but sales dropped off so rapidly the company halted Twin Cam production and used the matching chassis for some MGAs, with pushrod engines, known as the MGA 1600 MkI and MkII DeLuxe models.

=== Mitsubishi ===
Mitsubishi produced several hemi engines including the 'Orion', 'Astron', and 'Saturn' units.

=== Nissan ===
Nissan's Z, VG (SOHC version only) and DOHC VQ engines use hemispherical combustion chambers. The Z and VG are true hemispherical while the VQ uses a compound pent-roof shape.

=== Porsche ===
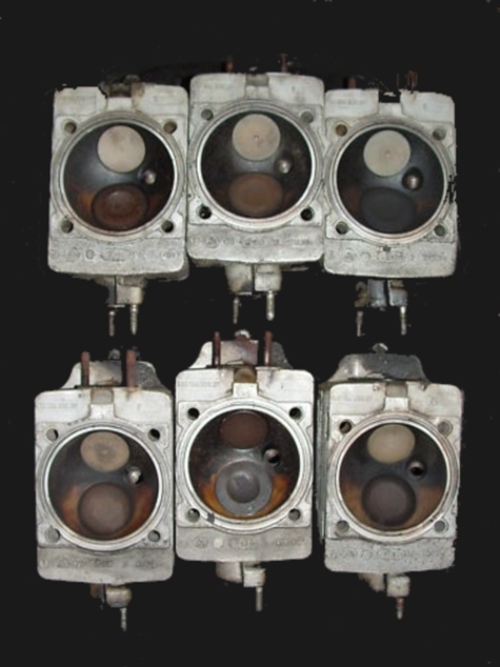
Porsche 6-cylinder boxer engine heads with hemi chambers

Porsche has made extensive use of hemi-head engines, including the air-cooled flat-6 engine in Porsche 911 models from 1963 to 1999. The 1973 2.7 L version generated 56 hp per naturally aspirated litre of piston displacement.

=== Toyota ===
Toyota's V engine family were longitudinally mounted V8s used in the prestigious Toyota Century from the 1960s through the 1990s. Toyota had worked with Yamaha to produce the first Japanese full aluminum alloy block engine. The V Family is often referred to as the Toyota HEMI as the engine features a similar cylinder head design to those found on the Chrysler's Hemi, even though most of the engine design is completely different.

Other Toyota engines (e.g. T, 2M, 4M etc.) at the time used a hemispherical combustion chamber. The spark plugs were located at the top of the combustion chamber.

== Design evolution in modern engines ==
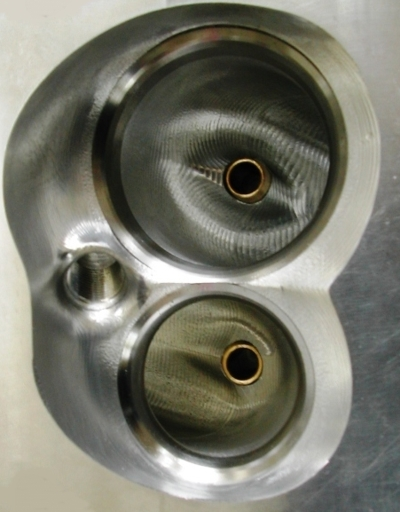
Modern (2007) non-Hemi active combustion chamber

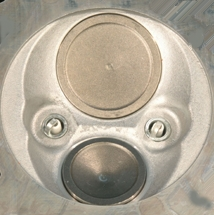
Current-production Chrysler "Hemi" combustion chamber with two spark plugs per cylinder

In the modern emissions-era, the hemi-chamber has morphed into more sophisticated and complex designs that are able to extract more power with lower emissions from any given combustion event.

Many of today's engines use "active combustion chambers" designed to tumble and swirl the fuel/air mix within the chamber for the most efficient combustion event possible. These chambers usually look like kidney beans or two merged small 'hemi' areas surrounded by flat quenching areas over the pistons.
