= Ford 385 engine =

Ford 385 V8
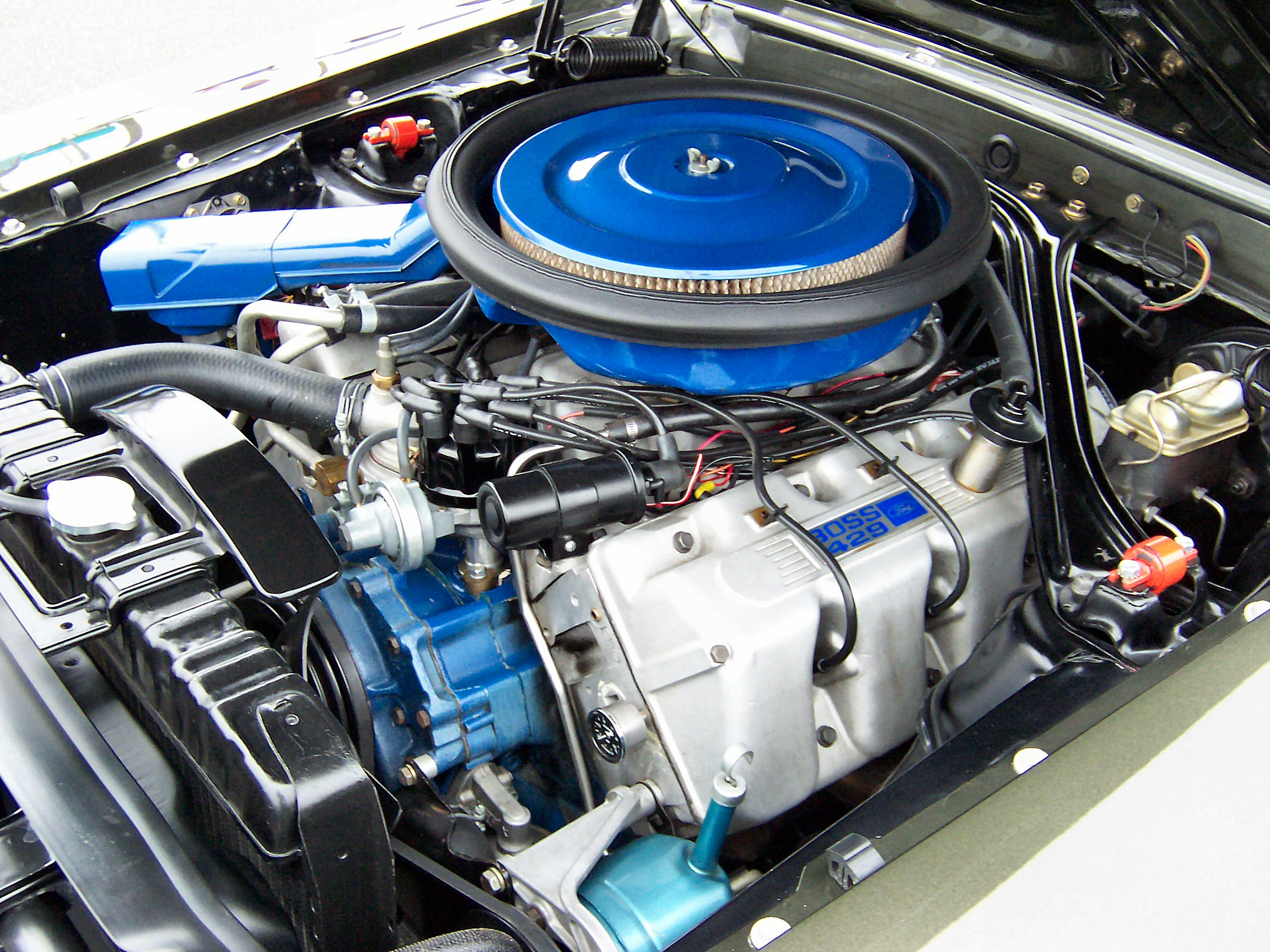
- Ford Mustang Boss 429 engine

Overview
- Manufacturer: Ford Motor Company
- Also called: Lima
- Production: 1968–1998

Layout
- Configuration: Naturally aspirated big-block V8
- Displacement: 370 cu in (6.1 L); 429 cu in (7.0 L); 460 cu in (7.5 L)
- Cylinder bore: 4.05 in (102.9 mm); 4.36 in (110.7 mm)
- Piston stroke: 3.59 in (91.2 mm); 3.85 in (97.8 mm)
- Cylinder block material: Cast iron
- Cylinder head material: Cast iron
- Valvetrain: OHV 2 valves per cylinder
- Compression ratio: 8.0:1, 8.5:1, 11.0:1, 11.3:1

Combustion
- Fuel system: Carburetor (1968–1987); Multi-port fuel injection (1988–1997)
- Fuel type: Gasoline
- Cooling system: Water-cooled

Output
- Power output: 375 hp (380 PS; 280 kW); 217 hp (220 PS; 162 kW)
- Specific power: 53.3 hp (39.7 kW) per liter 28.8 hp (21.5 kW) per liter
- Torque output: 500 lb⋅ft (678 N⋅m); 365 lb⋅ft (495 N⋅m)

Chronology
- Predecessor: Ford FE/FT V8; Ford MEL V8 (Lincoln); Ford Super Duty truck engine (heavy trucks)
- Successor: Ford Windsor V8 (cars); Ford Triton V10 (trucks)

The Ford 385 engine family is a series of “big block" overhead valve (OHV) V8 engines designed and manufactured by Ford Motor Company. The family derives its 385 name from the 3.85-inch (98 mm) stroke of the 460 cubic-inch V8 introduced in 1968. A 429 cu in (7.0 L) version was also introduced the same year, with a 370 cu in (6.1 L) variant appearing in 1977.

Produced until 1998, the 385 engines replaced the MEL engine entirely, along with multiple engines of the medium-block FE engine family. The engines saw use by all three Ford divisions in full-size cars, intermediates, personal luxury cars, pony cars, and muscle cars. In trucks, the engine family succeeded the much larger Super Duty family, and was used in full-size trucks and vans, along with medium-duty and heavy-duty trucks.

Produced in Lima, Ohio at the Lima engine plant, the engine family was the final big-block V8 designed and produced by Ford during the 20th century. Last used in intermediate cars in 1976, the engines were phased out of all Ford cars after 1978 as its full-size cars underwent downsizing. Following its shift to truck use, the 385 engines were joined by multiple diesel-powered engines.

In 1997, Ford introduced the overhead-cam Triton V10, which replaced the 385 V8 engine family after the 1998 model year; the next overhead-valve big-block V8 produced by Ford is the 7.3 L "Godzilla" V8 introduced for 2020.

== Versions ==
The engine was produced in 370 (6.1 L), 429 (7.0 L), and 460 cubic-inch (7.5 L) displacements. To reduce weight over their predecessors, the 385 engines utilized thinwall casting methods and a skirtless block.

=== 370 ===
The smallest-displacement engine of the 385 engine family, the 370 was introduced after the 429 and 460, replacing the 361 cu in (5.9 L) 360 Truck (FT) V8 in 1977. Sharing its 3.59-inch stroke with the 429, the 370 was designed with a downsized 4.05-inch bore (shared with its predecessor and the 390 V8). For 1979, the engine was rebranded in metric, as 6.1 L.

After 1991 production, the 370 was discontinued, with the 429 replacing it in all truck applications.

Applications:

- Ford medium-duty F-Series (1977–1991)
  - Ford F-600/F-700
  - Ford B-Series (1977–1989)
- Ford C-Series (1979–1987)
  - Ford C600–C800
- Ford L-Series "Louisville Line" (1977–1985)
  - Ford L600–L800

=== 429 ===
Introduced in 1968, the 429 was developed in conjunction with the 460 (also debuted in 1968) to replace the three largest FE-series V8s, the 390, 427, and 428. Both had wedge-shaped combustion chambers and shared a 4.36-inch bore, with the 429 destroked to 3.59-inches.

The 429 first appeared in the Ford Thunderbird, getting a one-year head start on other Ford and Mercury models, and saw use across both divisions' pony car, intermediate, and full-size product lines. It was also later available in high performance Cobra Jet versions for street use and police interceptors. A race-bred "semi-hemi" version for NASCAR competition was developed and installed for homologation purposes in the 1969 Boss 429 Mustang.

The 429 was replaced in 1974 by the 460 in Ford and Lincoln-Mercury cars, and only available in medium-duty Ford trucks after the 1973 model year.

The engine became marketed in metric in 1979, as the 7.0L V8. Initially replacing the 401 Super Duty V8, the 7.0L replaced the 477 and 534 Super Duty engines for 1982. After 1991, the 429 became the sole gasoline engine offered in medium sized and larger Ford trucks; the 460/7.5L was only used in trucks under 1½-ton payload.

The 1971 429 police interceptor was tuned similarly to the 429 Cobra Jet, with an 11.3:1 compression ratio. Featuring forged notched pistons the engine was rated at 370 hp (gross).

Applications:

- Ford Thunderbird (1968–1973)
- Ford Mustang (1969–1971)
  - Ford Mustang Boss 429 (1969–1970)
- Ford/Mercury full-size (1969–1973)
- Ford/Mercury intermediate: Torino, Montego, & Cyclone (1969–1973)
- Mercury Cougar (1971)
- Ford medium-duty F-Series (1977–1998)
  - Ford F-600/F-700/F-800
  - Ford B-Series (1977–1989)
- Ford C-Series (1979–1987)
  - Ford C600/C700/C800
- Ford L-Series "Louisville Line" (1977–1991)
  - Ford L900

==== Boss 429 ====
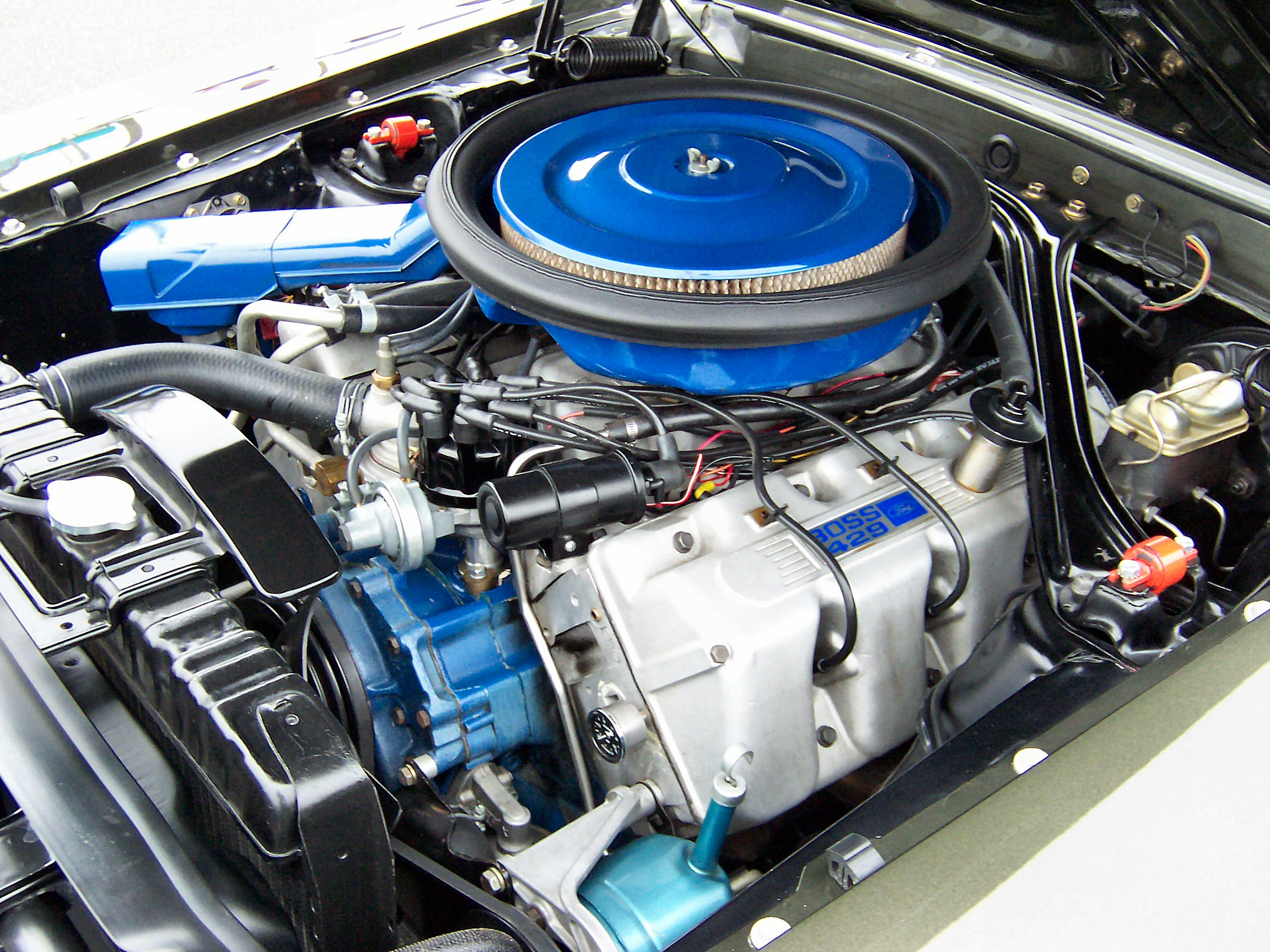
The distinctive enormous valve covers on a semi-hemispherical head Boss 429 engine

A race-bred "semi-hemi" version of the 429 was developed for NASCAR competition, and installed for homologation in the Boss 429 Mustang. This was a very different and much heavier duty engine than the standard 429, and distinct from the two high-performance wedge-head Cobra Jet versions. Designed to compete with the reigning most powerful street V8, the Chrysler 426 Hemi, it featured aluminum heads and intake manifold, a stiffened engine block, and many race-spec internal upgrades.

The Boss 429 Mustang and Mercury Cyclone Spoiler II were the engine's only street application, but it competed in NASCAR installed in various Ford and Mercury products, including the Cyclone Spoiler II and later builds of the Torino Talladega. It took home 26 winner's trophies in 1969, before factory support was curtailed going forward.

==== Cobra Jet ====
In addition to the NASCAR-bred "semi-hemi" used in the Boss 429 Mustang, Ford developed two high-performance street versions of the wedge head 429 between 1969 and 1971, the Cobra Jet and Super Cobra Jet.

The Cobra Jet (429CJ) was fitted with a Rochester Quadrajet 715 cu ft/min (20.2 m^{3}/min) Spreadbore 4-bbl carburetor, a larger camshaft; a special set of cylinder heads (DOOE-R) 73.5 CC, combustion chamber and canted valve configuration, with pushrod guide plates (DIOE-6465-AA) Intakes valves were 2.24 and exhaust valves were 1.74, with non-adjustable hydraulic lifters. This allowed for an 11.3:1 compression ratio, increasing output to 370 hp. The engine was fitted with or without a hood scoop, matched with a 3.25:1 rear-axle ratio. When fitted with a "shaker" hood scoop, a 429 CJ-Ram Air equipped vehicle received a 3.50:1 rear axle. In 1971, the CJ engine also used a four-bolt main block DOVE-A.

==== Super Cobra Jet ====
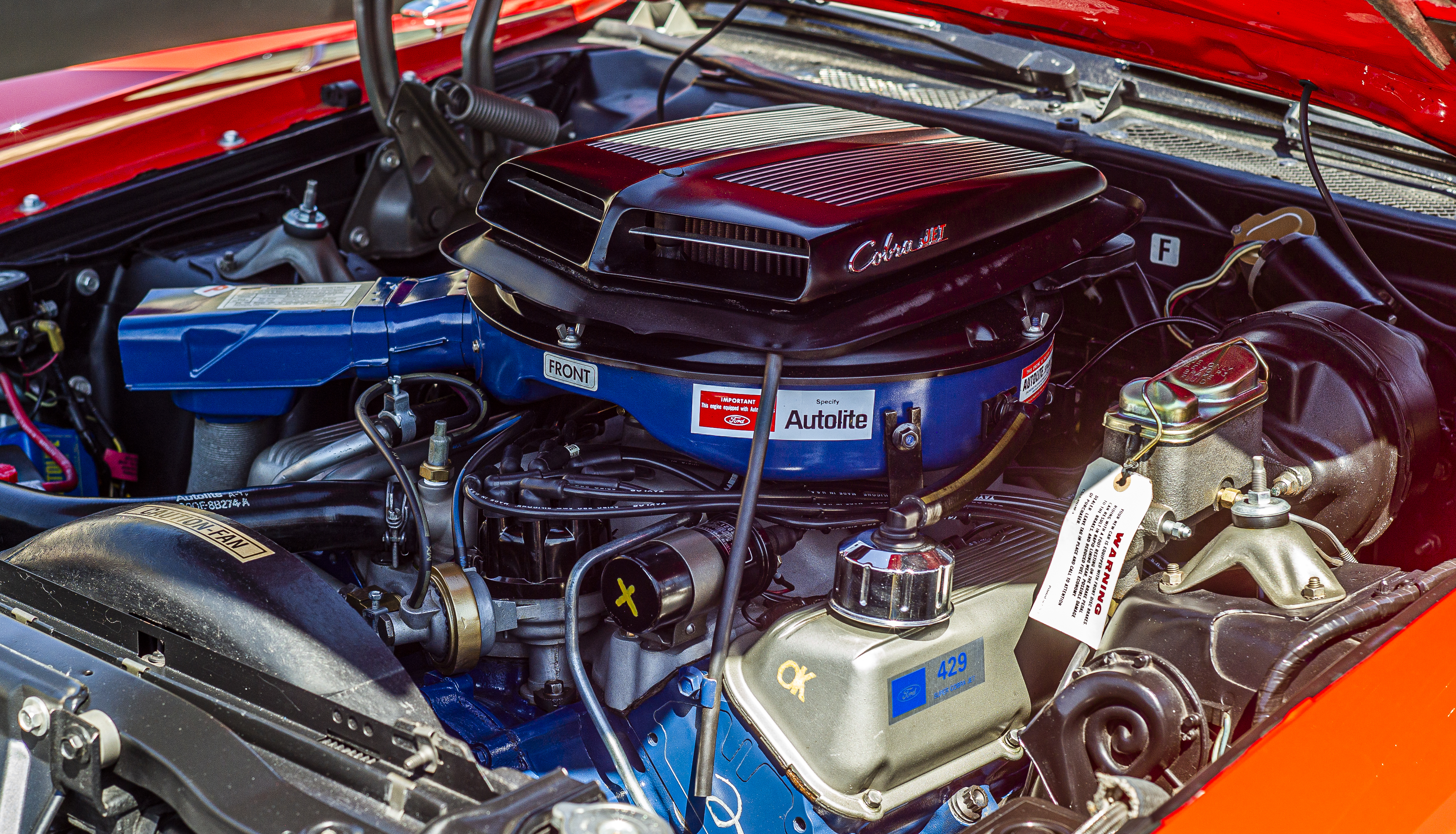
1970 Ford Torino with 429 Super Cobra Jet, showing shaker scoop and intake

The Super Cobra Jet (429SCJ) was fitted with a Holley 780 cu ft/min (22 m^{3}/min) Vac-Secondaries square-bore 4-bbl carburetor, larger mechanical camshaft, a four-bolt main block, forged pistons, single valve relief, forged rods, and Brinell tested cast iron crankshaft. The engine output was increased to 375 hp and 450 lb-ft of torque, matched with a 3.91:1 or 4.30:1 rear axle ratio.

=== 460 ===
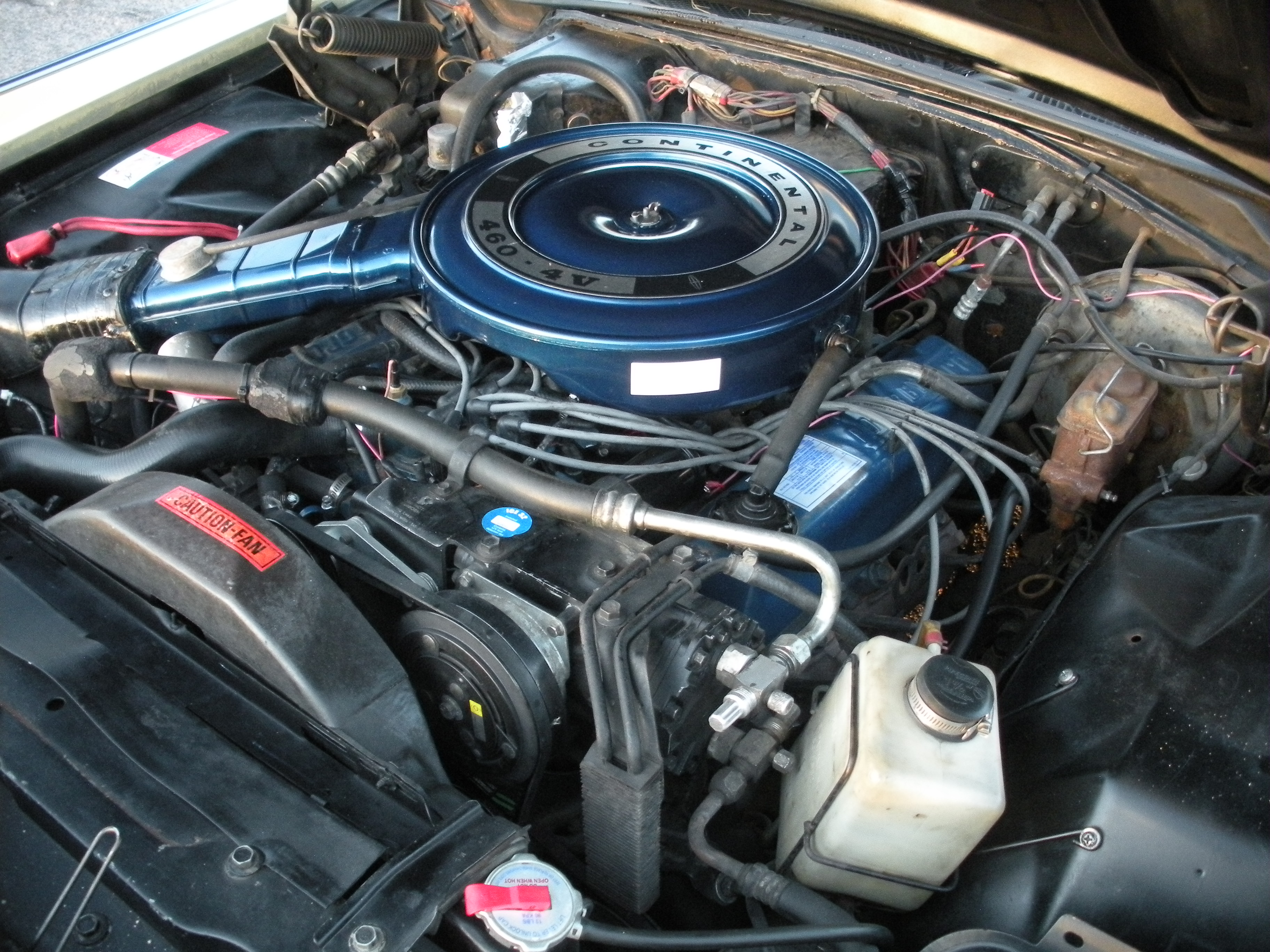
460-4V engine installed in a 1971 Continental Mark III

The largest-displacement 385 engine, the 460 was developed as the successor for the 462 MEL V8 and the 390 FE/FT V8. It shared a 4.36-inch bore with the 429 but the 460 was designed with a 3.85-inch stroke. For 1968, it was introduced in the Continental Mark III and availability was exclusive to Lincolns until 1971. In 1972, the engine was introduced for the Ford Thunderbird, Mercury Marquis and Colony Park. For 1973, the 460 was added to Ford full-size cars, Ford and Mercury intermediates, and Ford F-Series trucks. In 1975, it later became available on Econoline vans.

From 1968 to 1971, the 460 was rated at 365 gross hp. In 1972 SAE net horsepower, which accounted for real world power losses created by engine accessories and the exhaust system, was adopted as a standard in North America, resulting in a significant decrease in horsepower ratings of all engines. In addition, a reduction in the 460 compression ratio (to 8.5:1) and modification of camshaft timing to allow the engine to comply with Federally mandated exhaust emissions standards, caused the rated output to plunge to 212 hp (158 kW); output continued to change nearly annually thereafter to improve fuel economy and emissions performance in line with increasingly stringent Federal requirements, dropping as low as 197 hp (147 kW) in 1977.

As Ford began to respond to the implementation of CAFE during the late 1970s, the 460 V8 (previously standard in Lincolns and full-size Mercury lines) became an option, with the 400 V8 (335-series) becoming the standard V8 engine; after 1976, the engine was removed from intermediate-sized cars entirely. Coinciding with their eventual downsizing, full-sized Ford and Lincoln-Mercury cars (including the Continental Mark V) last used the 460 for the 1978 model year.

From 1980 to 1982, the 460 was exclusive to the Econoline 350 van, as the 400 V8 became the largest engine for F-Series trucks. For 1983, the 460 returned to the F-Series, replacing the 400. For 1988, the 460 received fuel injection and power jumped to 235 hp (175 kW) at 4100 rpm and 395 lb⋅ft (536 N⋅m) at 2200 rpm. The 460, now marketed in metric as 7.5 L, continued mostly unchanged until 1994 when some minor ECU and compression ratio changes brought another 10 hp and 15 lb·ft, raising output to 245 hp (183 kW) at 4100 rpm and 410 lb⋅ft (556 N⋅m) at 2200 rpm for the last three years of production.

Through its fitment on chassis-cab versions of the F-Series and cutaway cab configurations of the E-Series, the 460 saw many applications of commercial use; other applications include recreational vehicles/RVs and bus use. As a crate engine, the 460 was produced by Ford Motorsports through 1997. After the 1997 model year, the 460 was replaced by the 6.8 L V10.

From 1973 to 1978, Ford offered two versions of the 460 police engine: a lower-output 210 hp 460 Police Cruiser, identified by engine code "A" in the installed vehicle's vehicle identification number (VIN) and the engine's valve cover spec sticker, and the higher-output 460 Police Interceptor, designated "C". The cruiser came with a slightly modified passenger car 460 and was recommended for city and suburban use, while the more powerful, high speed modified 460 PI was built for highway patrol.

- 460 "A": a basic, street/production stock flowing engine with additional cooling bolt-ons and a block-mounted non-electric fuel pump.
- 460 "C": featured a higher lift (Police Interceptor) camshaft and better flowing heads (D2OE-AB) or (D3OE-AA, AB), Special balanced (at higher than normal RPM) crank, special Rods and Forged Aluminum Pistons. Low Restriction Dual Exhaust system, along with a high flow, in-tank electric fuel pump, as the stock, block-mounted, cam-driven vacuum lift fuel pump would starve the motor for fuel above 100 mph (160 km/h). Lubrication is guaranteed via a special engine oil cooler and Heavy-Duty oil pump. The 460 Interceptor was capable of producing speeds in excess of 133 mph (214 km/h) when installed in certain vehicles.

Applications:

- Lincoln Continental (1968–1979)
- Ford Thunderbird (1972–1976)
- Mercury Cougar (1974–1976)
- Ford/Mercury full-size (1972–1978)
- Ford/Mercury intermediate (1973–1976)
- Ford F-Series (1973–1979)
- Ford F-Series (1983–1997) (F-250 HD, F-350, and F-Super Duty)
- Ford E-Series (1975–1996)

=== Crate engines ===
A factory crate engine of 514 cu in was available from Ford from the mid 1990s until 2006. In 2016 Ford introduced a 572 cu in engine, which remains in production.

==== 514 ====
A 514 cu in (8.4 L) crate engine was available from Ford SVO.

==== 572 ====
A 572 cu in (9.4 L) crate engine (4.5 in (114.3 mm) bore and 4.5 in (114.3 mm) stroke) is available from Ford Performance Parts.

== Specifications ==
All engines

Deck height (early block): 10.3 or 10.31 in (261.6 or 261.9 mm)
Deck height (late block, D9TE): 10.322 in (262.2 mm)
Rod length: 6.605 in (167.8 mm)
Bore spacing 4.9 in (120 mm)

370

Bore × stroke: 4.05 in × 3.59 in (102.9 mm × 91.2 mm)

429

Bore × stroke: 4.360 in × 3.59 in (110.7 mm × 91.2 mm)
Chamber size (D00E-R) 75cc Cobra Jet
Chamber size (C8VE/C9VE/D0VE) 72cc ThunderJet
Chamber size (D2VE) ~99-100cc Passenger head
Chamber size (D20E) ~99-100cc Police Interceptor

460

Bore × stroke: 4.360 in × 3.85 in (110.7 mm × 97.8 mm)
Chamber size (C8VE/C9VE/D0VE) 72cc ThunderJet Avail in 460 Lincoln Motor High Compression
Chamber size (D3VE/E8TE): ~93-95cc Passenger Heads
Chamber size (F3TZ) 89.5-92.5cc

2 valves per cylinder (although labeled 460-4V, "V" stands here for "venturi" and addresses the carburetor capacity)

== See also ==
- List of Ford engines
- Lima Engine
