= Boss 429 Mustang =

Mustang Boss 429
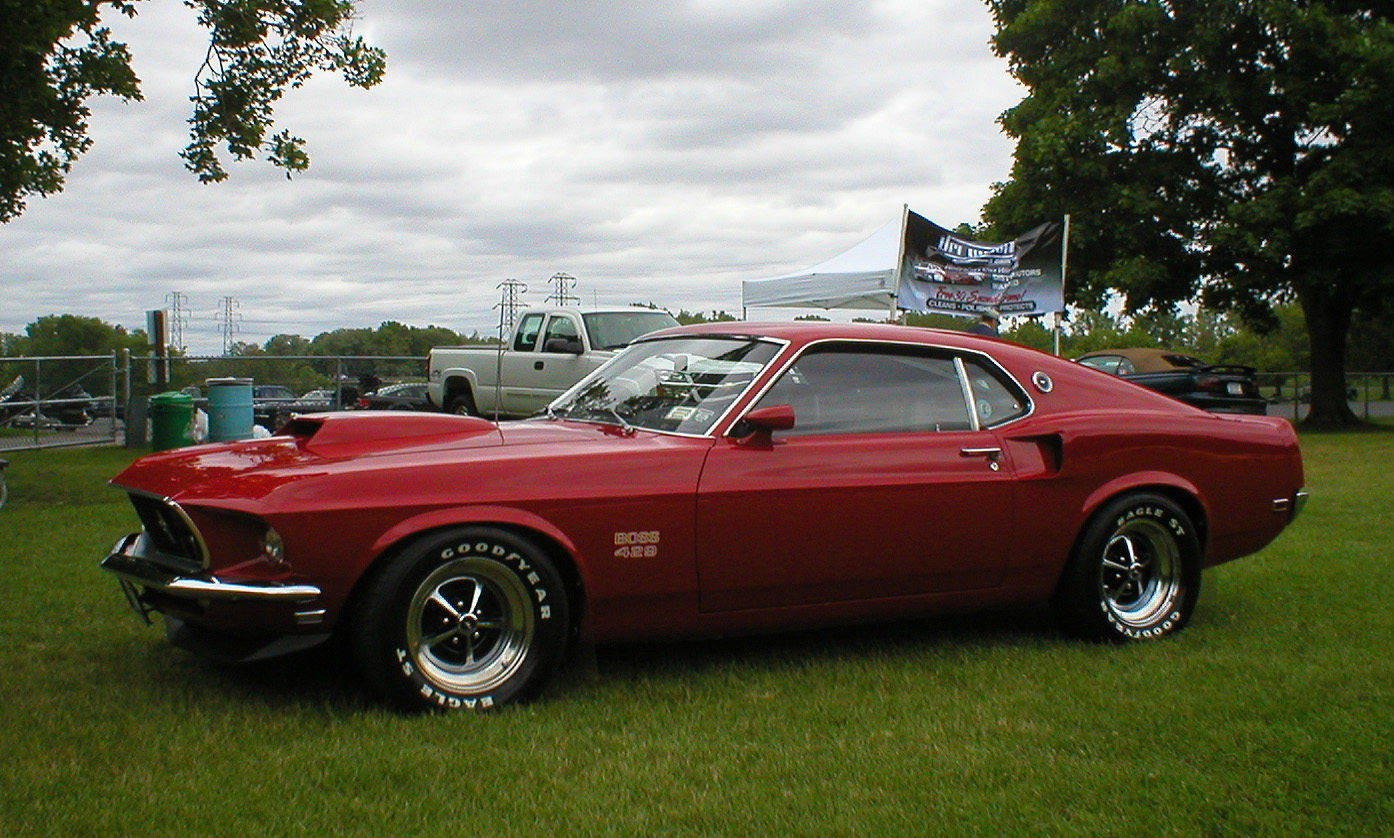
- 1969 Boss 429

Overview
- Manufacturer: Ford
- Production: 1969–1970
- Assembly: Dearborn, Michigan

Body and chassis
- Class: Muscle car/Pony car
- Body style: 2-door coupe
- Layout: Longitudinal engine mounted Front-engine, rear-wheel-drive layout

Powertrain
- Engine: 429 cu in (7.0 L) "Boss 429" V8
- Transmission: 4-speed manual

Dimensions
- Length: 187.4 in (4,760 mm)
- Width: 71.7 in (1,821 mm)
- Height: 50.4 in (1,280 mm)
- Curb weight: 3,870 lb (1,755 kg)

The Boss 429 Mustang is a high-performance Ford Mustang variant that was offered by Ford in 1969 and 1970. It featured a race-designed 429 cu in (7.0 L) semi-hemispherical head version of the big block 429 V8, offered in the car both to homologate the engine for NASCAR racing and to offer a bigger, more-powerful version of the popular small block 5 L Boss 302 Mustang.

The price of all the performance and modifications was steep: at nearly $5,000 a Boss 429 was roughly twice the price of the base model inline-6 Mustang. A total of 1,359 Boss 429s were produced.

== Overview ==
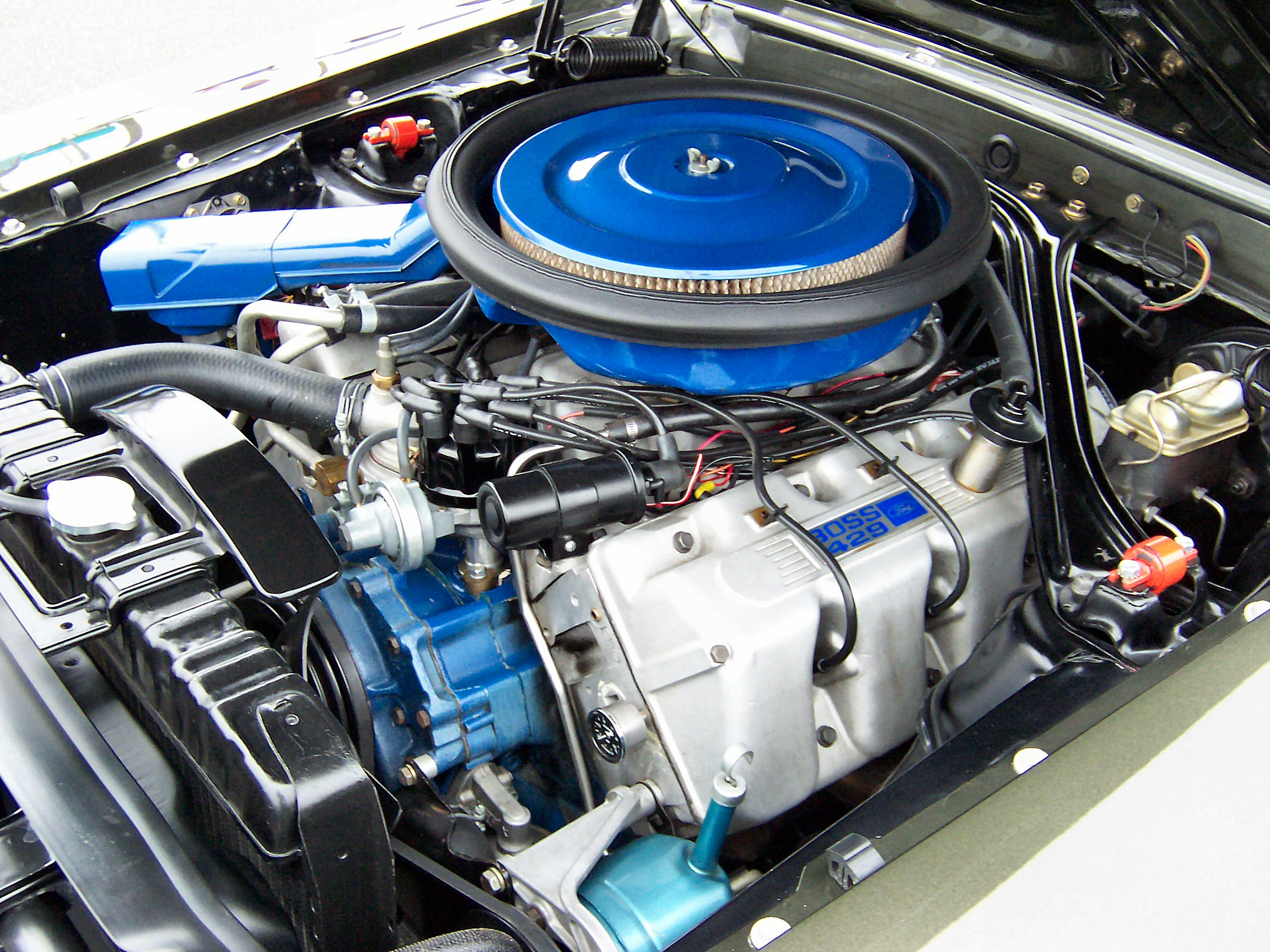
The distinctive enormous valve covers on a semi-hemispherical head Boss 429 engine

The Boss 429 was produced in limited numbers in 1969 and 1970. Its origin is twofold: allow Ford to homologate a new high-performance semi-hemispherical headed variant of its existing conventional valve 429 V8 for NASCAR racing, and to provide a big block alternative to the popular small block Boss 302 Mustang (whose displacement had been limited to 5.0 L and under to compete in Trans Am Racing).

Ford had already produced successful high-performance 427 cu in and 428 cu in racing engines from older blocks, but was looking to develop one based on its newest engine family, the Ford 385, to challenge the extremely powerful but aging Chrysler 426 Hemi in NASCAR's Grand National Division, today known as the NASCAR Cup Series. NASCAR's homologation rules required that at least 500 cars be fitted with this motor and sold to the general public. After much consideration at Ford, the Mustang was selected as the platform to offer the highly modified motor in.

=== Engine ===
The 429 cu in (7.0 L) big block 429 V8 used in the Boss 429 Mustang was heavily modified for racing. Though not formally known as the "Boss 429 engine" by Ford the way the Boss 302 engine was, it acquired that informal designation from its introduction in the 1969 Boss 429 Mustang.

Like the Boss 302 Mustang, the car and engine were heavily modified by Kar Kraft, Ford Motor's specialty Among the engine's high performance features were four-bolt main caps, a forged steel crank, forged steel connecting rods, and aluminum cylinder heads with a semi-hemispherical type combustion chamber which Ford called the "crescent". The engines used the "dry-deck" cooling, where the block and heads had separate coolant circuits. This strengthened the block by removing the open coolant passages into the head, and reduced hot spots by providing more direct cooling. To prevent failures at high engine loads and sustained high engine speeds, each cylinder, oil passage and water passage had an individual "O" ring seal, which was backstopped by a head gasket.

The Boss 429 engine received a 735 CFM Holley 4-barrel carburetor mounted on an aluminum intake manifold that flowed well for its time. Model year 1969 cars featured hydraulic lifters, which were switched to solid lifters in 1970 to minimize valve float at high rpm. The dual exhaust system was also improved, but rated power stayed the same.

Such a large engine made the car nose heavy. To help offset this, the battery was relocated to the trunk, and a 3/4" sway bar was added to the rear end to limit body roll. This was the first Mustang ever fitted with a rear sway bar, giving it better handling than the other large engine Mustangs of the time, making it a much more capable track car. So did an oil cooler which allowed both high engine speeds and endurance loads, and a manually controlled hood scoop for bringing in denser air for more thorough combustion. For better ground clearance the front spoiler was made shallower than the Boss 302's, and a 3.91 ratio rear axle came with a "Traction-Lock" limited slip differential. Other features included color keyed dual racing mirrors, an 8,000rpm tachometer, and AM only radio.

The enormous "semi-hemi" Boss 429 engine was so wide the Mustang's engine compartment could not accommodate it. Ford contracted with Kar Kraft of Dearborn, Michigan, a Ford exclusive experimental facility that functioned as Vehicle Engineering for Ford's Special Vehicles, to modify Mustang front apron assemblies that could be bolted into place on the main assembly line. The result was a stronger and cleaner front structure, important considerations on such a performance car, that included reworked front fenders.

Production began in 1968, with Kar Kraft front aprons being fitted to Boss 429s at the Ford Rouge plant during vehicle construction. The cars were then shipped to Kar Kraft's new assembly plant in Brighton, Michigan for engine installation and further modifications.

==== Rated output ====
The cars were advertised at 375 bhp (380 PS; 280 kW) at 5200 rpm and 450 lb⋅ft (610 N⋅m) of torque at 3400 rpm. In 1970, the speed equipment manufacturer Crane Cams tested engines that were stock as manufactured, with the exception of substituting tubular headers for the stock cast iron exhaust manifolds. For the 1969 hydraulic lifter engine, they measured a peak of 352.0 bhp (262.5 kW) at 5500 rpm. The 1970 mechanical lifter engine measured better, with a peak of 366.5 bhp (273.3 kW), also at 5500 rpm, supporting Ford's horsepower rating.

==== Use in NASCAR ====
With the release and homologation of the 440-powered Charger Daytona by rival manufacturer Dodge, the Boss 429 Mustang's NASCAR plans were scrapped. However, as the Boss 429 engine was homologated in the Mustang, Ford used it in NASCAR until 1974 in other Ford and Mercury body platforms, including the Mercury Cyclone Spoiler II and Torino Talladega. It took home 26 winner's trophies in 1969, before factory support was curtailed going forward.

It also was used in NHRA Pro Stock class during the 1980s, its main proponent there being Bob Glidden's championship winning Pro Stock Thunderbird.

=== Exterior ===
Both model years featured a toned-down exterior compared to other performance Mustangs of the era, which often emphasized appearance over its reality. The Boss 429 featured a very clean look that lacked both the spoiler and window louvers commonly seen on 1969–1970 Boss 351, Boss 302, and Mach 1, with its only external identification being Boss 429 decals on the front fenders and unique enlarged hood scoop.

To indicate the model's role in getting the Ford "semi-hemi" version of its 429 V8 engine homologated for NASCAR, each car was given a special NASCAR identification on the interior of the driver's door, and a "KK" number reflecting the custom modifications by Kar Kraft. KK #1201 was the first Boss 429 and KK #2558 was the last.

=== Sales ===
However, sales started to drop off for the 1970 Boss 429 Mustangs and with higher production costs and other internal Ford problems, it was decided that 1970 would be the last year of the Boss 429.

A total of 1,359 original Boss 429 Mustangs were made.

Today, these cars are highly sought after. As of 2008, auctions on eBay and at Barrett-Jackson have brought bids of over $375,000. In 2013 an unrestored black 1969 Boss 429 sold for $417,000 at Mecum Auctions in Kissimmee, Florida. In 2016 a restored black 1969 Boss 429 sold for $500,000 at a Barrett-Jackson auction in Palm Beach, Florida.

== 1969 Model ==
In 1969, Ford produced 859 Boss 429s. Also, two Boss 429 Cougars were produced for the Lincoln/Mercury Race Division. All 1969 Bosses had black interiors and came in one of five exterior colors: Raven Black, Wimbledon White, Royal Maroon, Candy apple Red, or Black Jade. The fully functional hood scoop was body color and was noticeably larger than anything else offered on any Ford or Mercury vehicle. That scoop would carry over to the 1970 model year, but would be painted black on all cars. To this day, it is the largest factory hood scoop ever installed on a production Mustang.

All cars came with 4-speed manual transmissions. The huge engine, shoehorned into a modified Mustang front end, left no room for air conditioning. Some early cars were known as "S" code cars and as such had a slightly different engine, with magnesium valve covers, NASCAR style forged internals, and close to no smog or emissions equipment. They are said to be more powerful than the later "T" and "A" code engines (which had the emissions related equipment to satisfy government regulations). Because of the extreme torque and horsepower the engine was capable of producing (and the ability of the race-spec internal parts and exceptionally strong engine block, Boss 429 engines have been reused in other high-performance applications, such as tractor pulling.

== 1970 Model ==
In 1970, Ford produced 499 Boss 429s. Five new exterior colors were available: Grabber Orange, Grabber Green, Grabber Blue, Calypso Coral, and Pastel Blue. Interior color options were either black or white and black. The hood scoops were all painted matte black. A Hurst shifter was standard equipment. A dealer-installed option of a "six-pack" of three two-barrel carburetors and companion intake was made available, though very few of these were sold.

Classic Recreations produces the 1969-70 Ford licensed Boss 429 as of April 2018.

== See also ==
- Boss 302 Mustang, Trans-Am homologation 5 L Mustang variant in 1969 and 1970
