= Boss 302 Mustang =

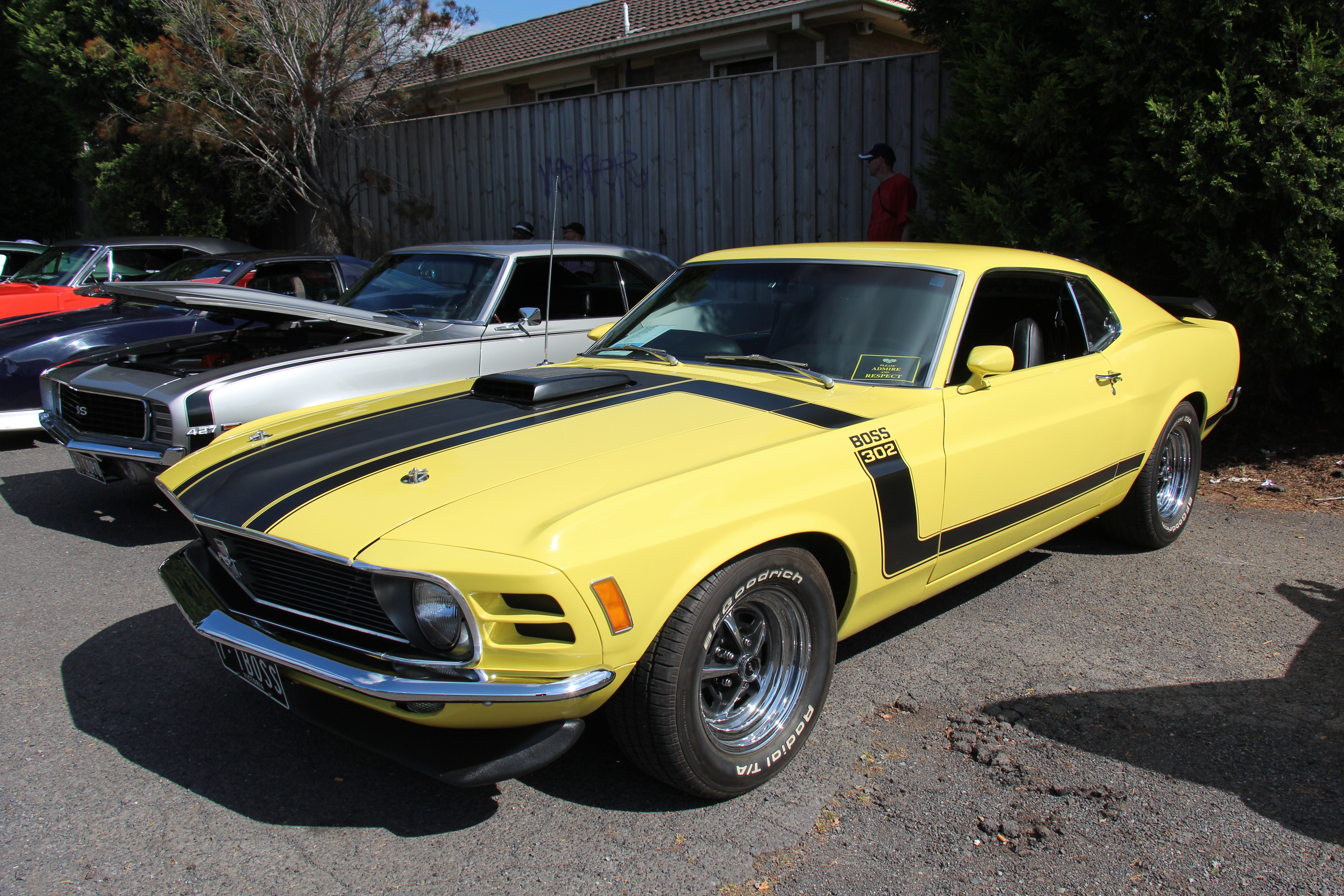

Overview
- Manufacturer: Ford
- Production: 1969–1970 and 2012–2013
- Assembly: Dearborn, Michigan (1969–1970); Flat Rock, Michigan (2012–2013)
- Designer: Larry Shinoda

Body and chassis
- Class: Muscle car
- Body style: 2-door Fastback Coupe
- Layout: FR layout
- Related: Ford Mustang

Powertrain
- Engine: 302 CID (5.0L) Boss 302 OHV V8 (1969–1970); 5.0 L "Roadrunner" DOHC V8 (2012–2013)
- Transmission: 4-speed manual (1969–1970); 6-speed manual (2012–2013)

The Mustang Boss 302 is a high-performance 302 cu in (4.9 L) H.O. V8-powered variant of the Ford Mustang originally produced by Ford in 1969 and 1970. Developed to meet homologation requirements to compete in Trans Am racing, it was Ford's response to the success of the Chevrolet Camaro Z/28 in the 5 L (305.1 cu in) and under SCCA series since 1967. While substantial modifications were required to the stock Boss 302 to be competitive on the track, many thousands were sold to the public in a street-legal form that included a refined high-performance motor and upgrades to the suspension and brakes over base Mustangs.

Ford revived the Boss 302 name for another two year production run in 2012 and 2013.

== First generation (1969–1970) ==
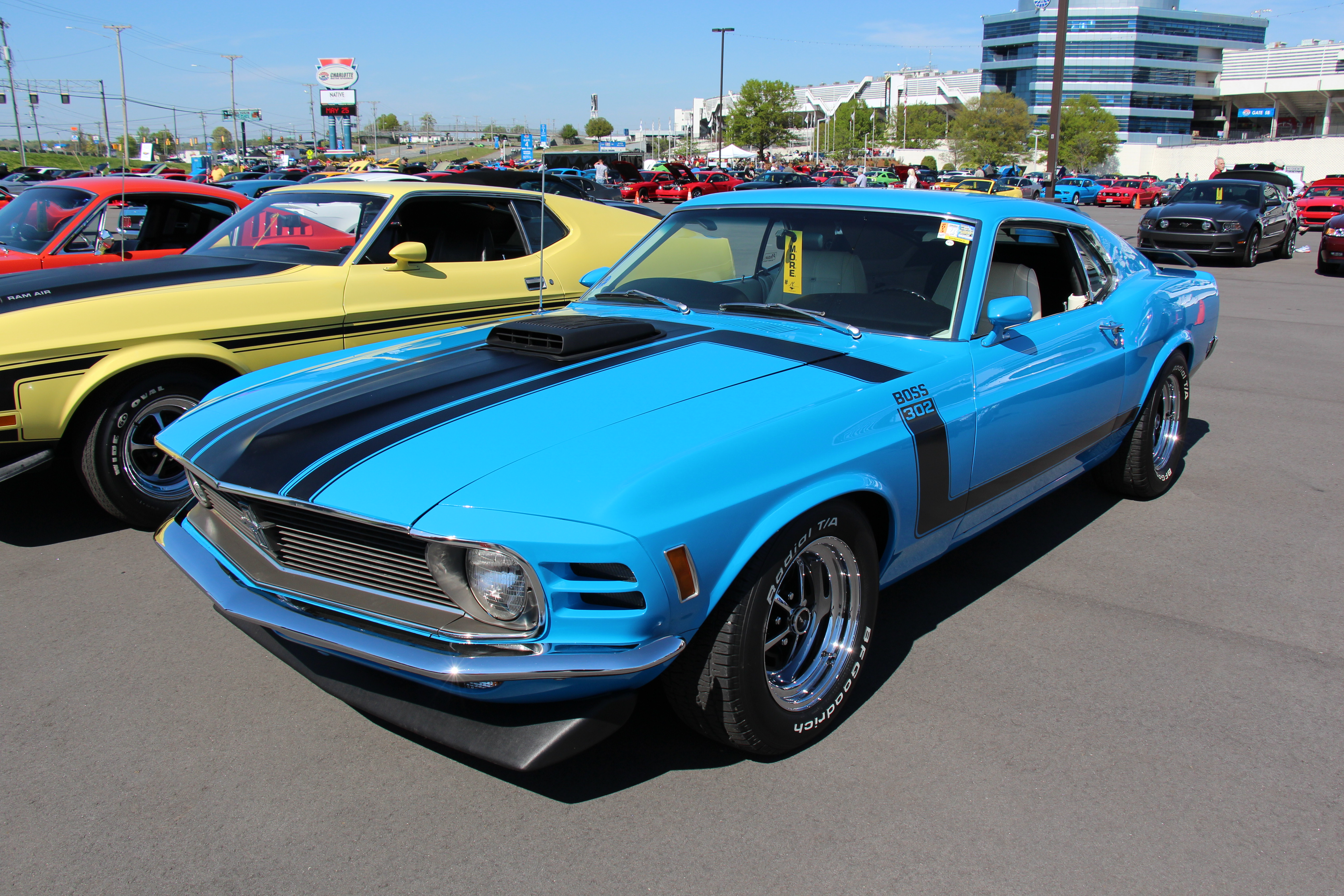
1970 Boss 302 Mustang

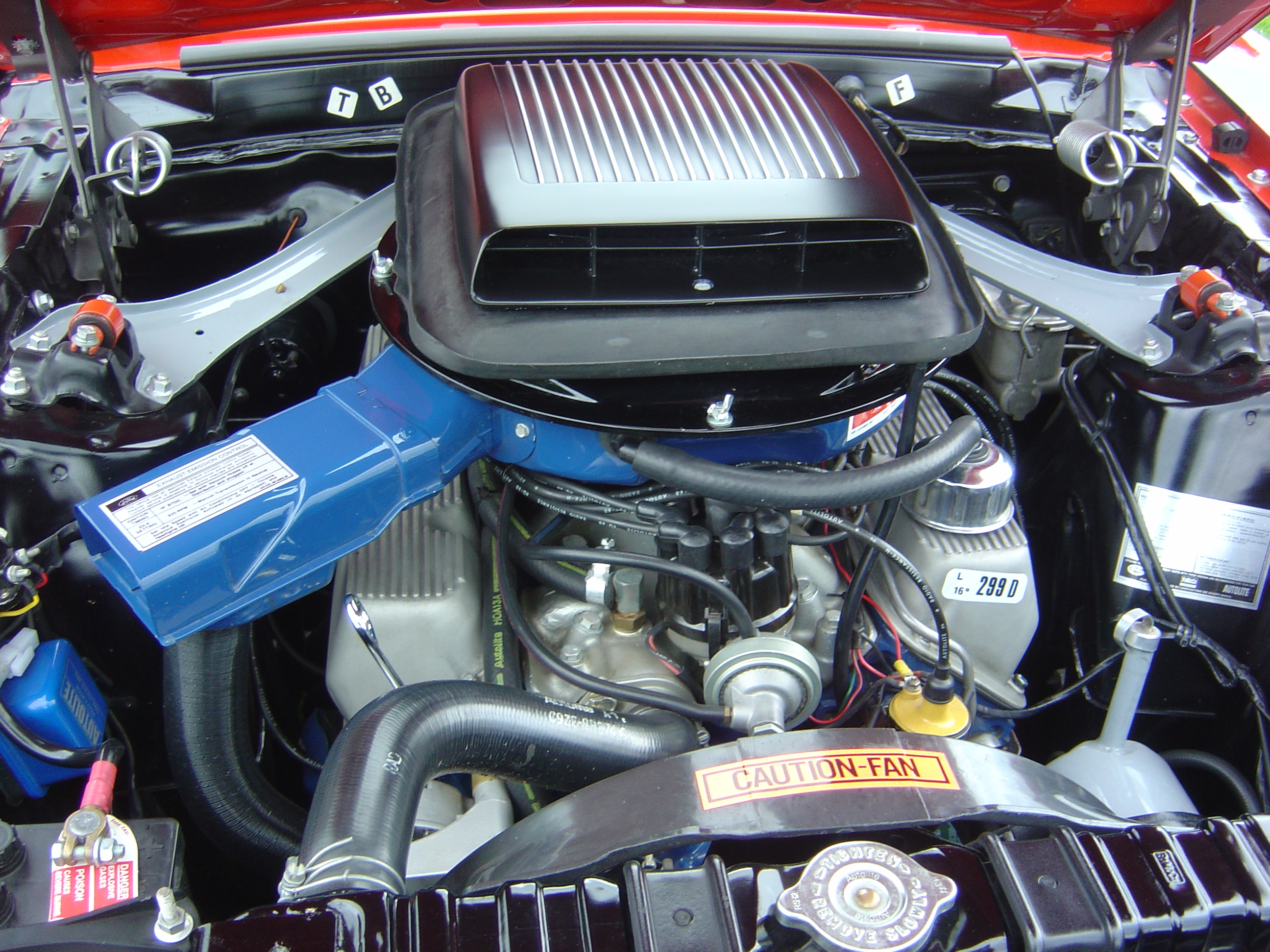
Boss 302 engine with the shaker hood scoop

The Camaro/Mustang rivalry had begun in 1967 with the introduction of the Chevrolet Camaro by General Motors. The Camaro was the largest threat to the lead Ford had in the "pony car" field, a market segment largely created by Ford with the introduction of the Mustang in mid-year 1964. The performance of the Mustang with Ford's stock 289 cu in small block and 390 cu in big block V8s was not up to the Camaro's with equivalent Chevy engines. In an effort to improve the Mustang's image, Ford developed the Boss 302 engine and offered it in a complete performance package in 1968 mid-year and 1969 models as the Boss 302 Mustang, and the 429 cu in 385 series engine in the Boss 429 Mustang as a similar big block-powered alternative. The 428 Cobra Jet was also offered as a high-performance stand-alone option on regular Mustangs.

The specific impetus for the 1969–70 Boss 302 engine in 1968 was meeting the SCCA's homologation requirements for qualifying to race in the 1969 305 C.I.D. (5.0L) and under Trans-Am road racing series, with the 7 liter big block Boss 429 developed likewise for the higher limit of the NASCAR circuit at that time.

Available only in the Boss 302 Mustangs of 1969–70, the engine differed substantially from stock Ford 302s, being based on a unique thin-wall, high nickel content small block casting. Other performance upgrades included solid lifters, much stronger 4-bolt rather than 2-bolt main crankshaft bearings, threaded rather than simple compression freeze plugs, and heads using a canted valve design allowing for larger valves being developed for the planned 351 Cleveland (which debuted the following year). Though the two engines shared a common cylinder head bolt pattern, coolant passages were slightly modified in the heads on the Boss 302.

The engine was only available in a complete Boss 302 package, which included a four speed manual transmission and handling and aerodynamic aids necessary to compete on a race track. In addition to a lower ride height, standard equipment included front disc brakes, larger sway bars, heavier duty spindles, reinforced shock towers. This "G Code" engine was rated at 290 hp (216 kW).

The Boss 302 Mustang was styled by Larry Shinoda, a former GM employee, who deleted the fake air scoops in the rear quarter panel fenders of the regular production 1969 Mustangs, added a front spoiler, and a rear deck wing, making the Boss 302 one of the first production cars to feature both. Black horizontal rear window shade and a blackout hood were both options. The name "Boss", popular 1960s slang for "excellent" or "very cool", got attached to the car when Shinoda was asked what he was working on, answering "the boss's car", referring to new Ford president Semon "Bunkie" Knudson, who had brought Shinoda over from GM's Chevrolet Division.

Changes for the 1970 model year included side "hockey stick" stripes, and a front end which replaced the outer pair of headlights with vents and moved the headlights inside the grille opening. The dual exhaust system and suspension were designed, and a Hurst shifter became standard. The intake valves were slightly smaller, and cast aluminum valve covers replaced the chrome. With a suggested price of $3,720, a total of 7,013 were sold.

The 1970 model could accelerate from 0 to 60 mph (97 km/h) in 6.9 seconds, and cover the quarter mile (~400 m) in 14.6 seconds at a top speed of 98 mph (158 km/h).

Ford also had an option for Boss 302's and 429's for deluxe interior rather than standard interior

=== Trans-Am racing ===
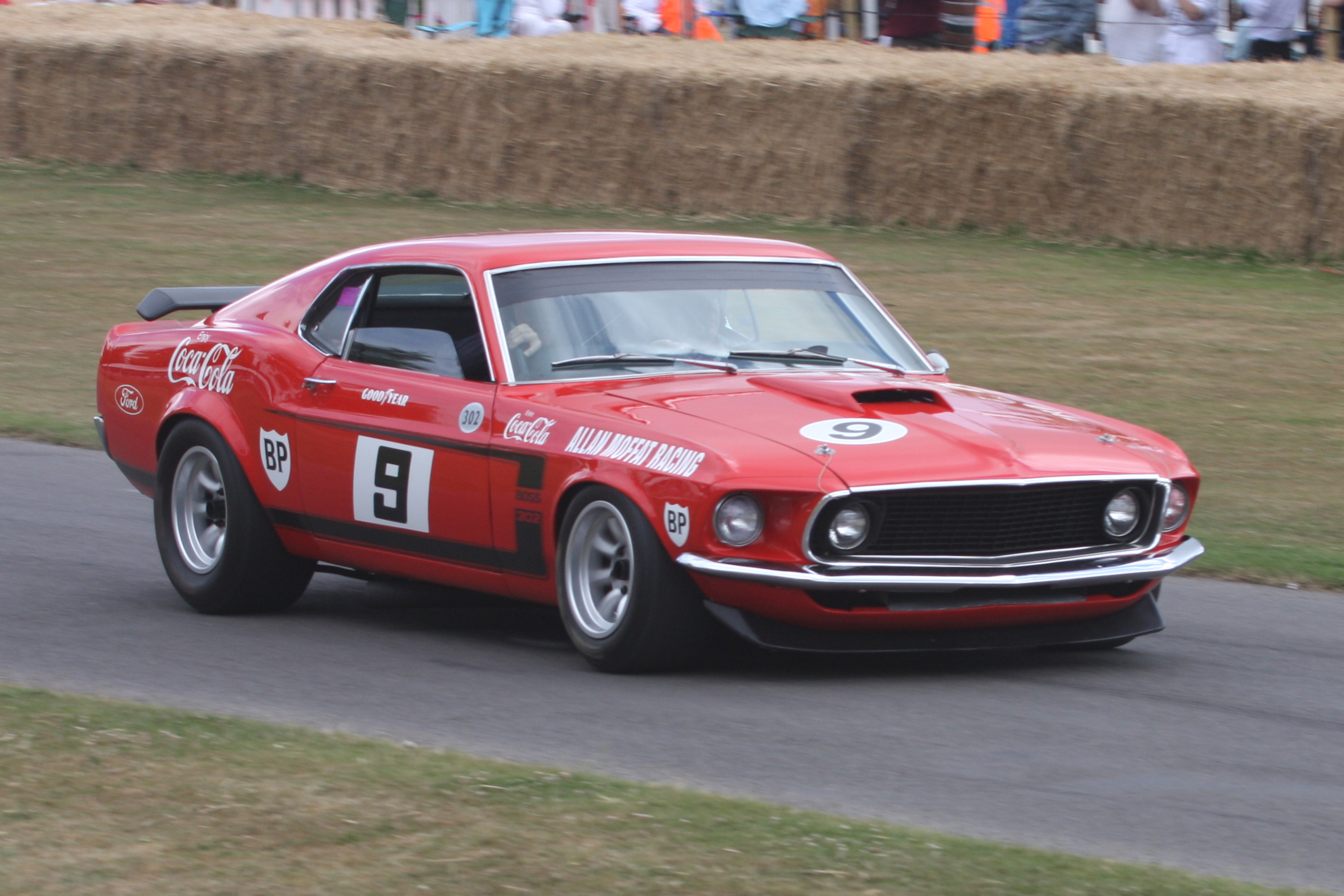
1969 Mustang Boss 302 race car

The SCCA Trans-Am series was popular in the late 1960s, especially after the birth of the "pony car". A type of "stock-car" racing usually held on road courses, the series limited maximum engine displacement to 5 L (305.1 cu in). In an effort to be competitive, various Detroit car manufacturers produced some a number of variants of their usual "pony car" lineups in both road and track trim (for homologation purposes), equipped with high-performing variants of their small block 300-inch class V8 engines. The Boss 302 program was part of an effort by Ford to win the coveted SCCA Trans-Am Championship in 1969–1970. Penske Camaros had triumphed in 1968 and 1969, but team Penske switched to American Motors' Javelin the following year, so in 1970 the Boss 302's direct competition were the AAR Cudas, the Pontiac Firebird, the Team Chaparral Camaros, and the Penske AMC Javelins.

The Ford entry for 1969 and 1970 was the Boss 302 Mustang, which was dogged by non-mechanical problems in '69 but won in '70. In 1969, tire trouble and slow pit stops were major factors limiting the Ford team's success. With Roger Penske as Chevrolet's racing team manager, pit stops were choreographed to maximize efficiency, far outperforming the Mustang team's efforts. Ford's Firestone brand tires also proved inadequate. In 1970 the factory effort was headed up by Bud Moore, who fielded two cars in the 1970 season running on Goodyears and edged out Team Penske's Javelins, with lead Penske driver Mark Donohue losing out to Bud Moore driver Parnelli Jones.

Ford dropped the Boss 302 after 1970. In 1971 AMC came out with a redesigned Javelin and returned to the track with Donohue and ex-Mustang driver George Follmer. Donohue dominated the circuit in 1971, and again Follmer in 1972, leading to back-to-back AMC victories.

=== Australian touring cars ===
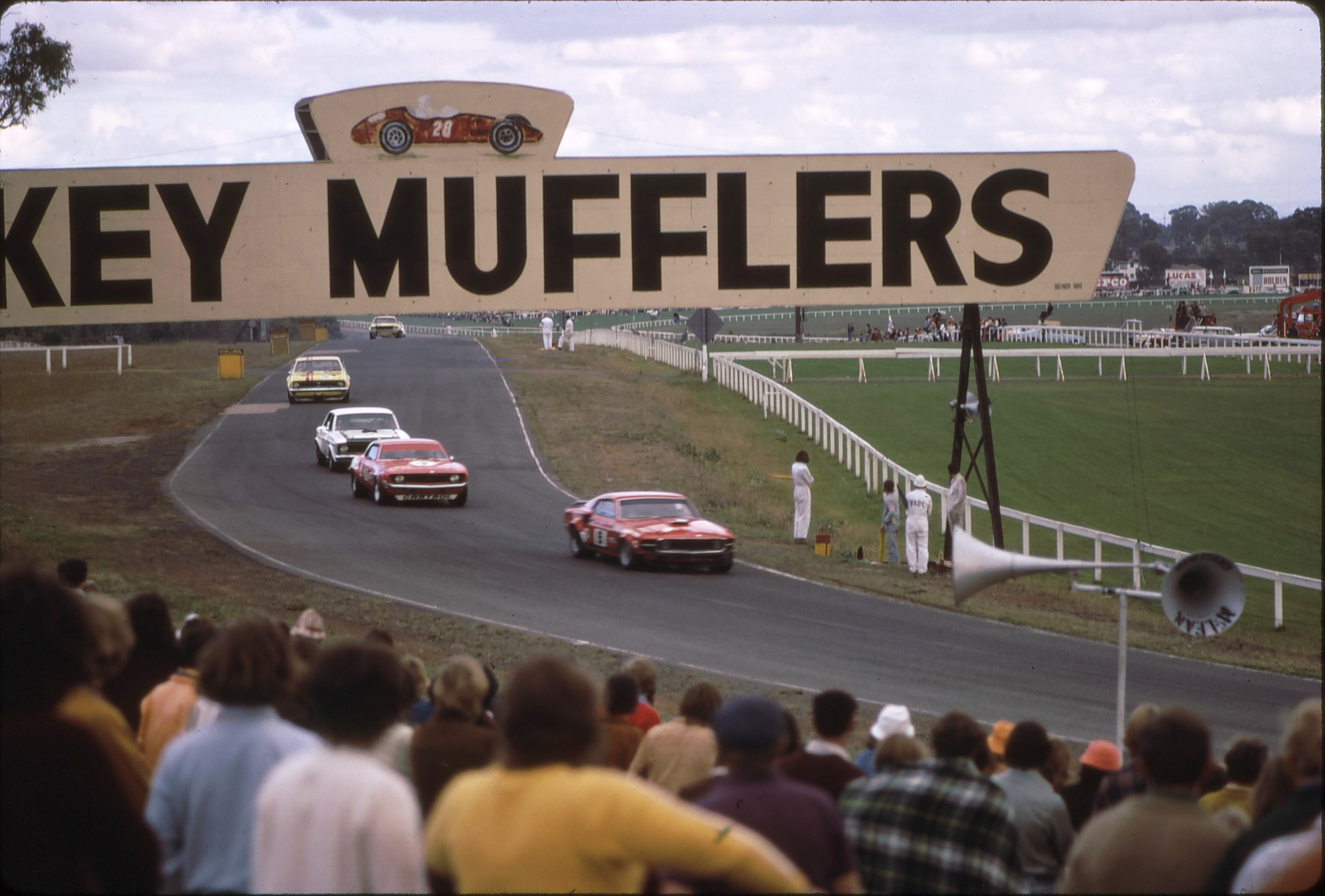
Allan Moffat driving the Boss 302 Mustang at Sandown in 1972.

The Boss Mustang platform experienced racing success in Australia, with Canadian-born driver Allan Moffat, driving his Coca-Cola-sponsored Mustang to a recorded 101 wins from 151 starts. Moffat's car was a gift from Ford's American in-house race car fabrication and engineering facility, Kar Kraft, and finished off by Bud Moore Engineering. Moffat raced the Mustang in the Australian Touring Car Championship (ATCC) from 1969 to 1972. Although he failed to place in the top 10 in 1969, he finished 6th in 1970, 2nd in 1971 and 3rd in 1972. As of December 2012, this car has been fully restored to original, and is owned by Queensland based collector David Bowden who regularly shows the car at historic events throughout Australia.

Since its restoration, the only person Bowden has allowed to drive the car (other than his son Dan) is its former owner Allan Moffat. Moffat has said that the car is his favourite car of his 30 years in racing, and that the gift of the car from Ford in 1969 was a pivotal moment in his career.

=== Legacy ===
The Boss 302 is reproduced as a model and toy, with diecast models including Hot Wheels, Matchbox, and Ertl's "American Muscle", and many others. It is recognizable by the "hockey stick" side stripe, rear louvers and chin spoiler (although those features can also signify a Boss 429 Mustang). The 1970 is available, but there are also some 4-headlight 1969 models as well.

Many "Boss 302" replicas been created out of regular fastback Mustangs, with varying degrees of accuracy, including efforts to dishonestly clones vehicles to capitalize on the relative rarity and expense of existing examples of the original automobiles, especially race-prepped models.

In 2007 a pair of restored 1969 Boss Mustangs sold for $530,000.

Also in 2007 Saleen and American racing legend Parnelli Jones created a limited-edition S302PJ version of the Mustang designed to pay homage to the legendary 1970 Boss 302 that Jones had raced in the Trans Am series.

== Second generation (2012–2013) ==
=== Boss 302 ===
2012 Boss 302 Laguna Seca
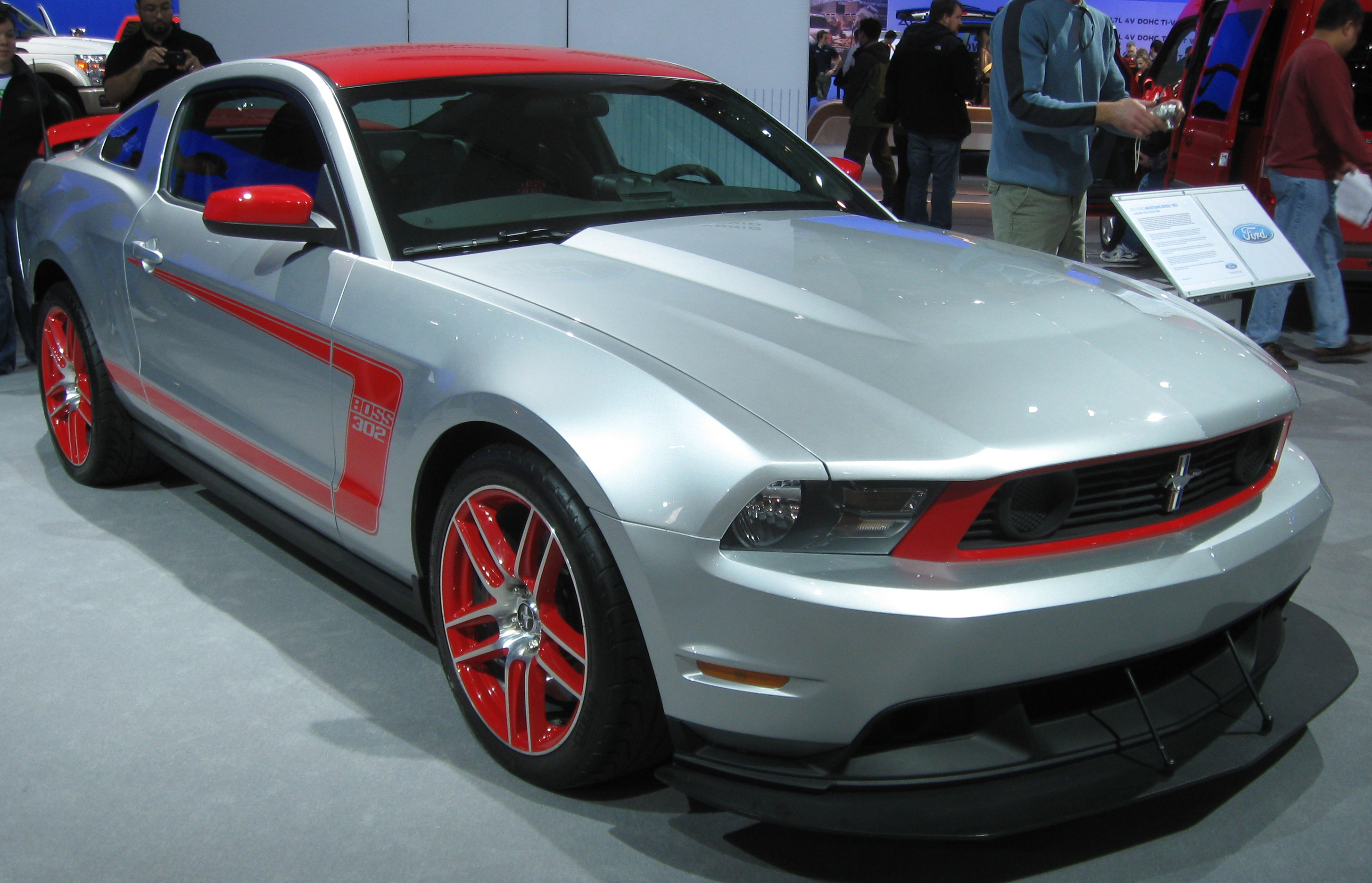

Overview
- Production: 2012
- Assembly: AutoAlliance International (Flat Rock, Michigan, US)

Body and chassis
- Body style: 2-door 2+2 sports coupe
- Platform: 5th Generation Mustang

Powertrain
- Engine: 5.0 L Coyote V8

Dimensions
- Wheelbase: 107.1 in (2,720 mm)
- Length: 188.1 in (4,778 mm)
- Width: 73.9 in (1,877 mm)
- Height: 55.1 in (1,400 mm) (Coupe)
- Curb weight: 3,631 lb (1,647 kg)

Ford revived the Boss 302 nameplate for 2012. The standard 2011 Ford Mustang GT's 5.0-liter Coyote V8 engine was enhanced with a forged crankshaft, CNC ported heads, revised camshafts, and a high flow "runners in the box" intake taken from the 302R racecar. It produced 450 PS (444 hp; 331 kW) at 7400 rpm and 380 lb⋅ft (515 N⋅m) at 4500 rpm, 32 more hp and 10 less lb-ft than the standard GT. It came with a 6-speed MT-82 manual transmission and a solid rear axle with a 3.73:1 carbon fiber plate limited-slip differential; a Torsen differential was available as an option. The quad exhaust system was made up of two standard Mustang GT outlets and two side pipes that exited on either side of the rear crossover. The side pipes sent the exhaust through removable metal "attenuation" discs to reinforce the exhaust sound.

The Boss 302 suspension supplemented the Mustang GT's with higher-rate coil springs, stiffer bushings, and a larger diameter rear stabilizer bar, and was dropped by a bit less than 1/2" in the front to evoke the stance of the original. An intermediate sport mode was added to the standard Mustang traction control system and electronic stability control programs to allow for more flexibility on the track.

The aero package (i.e. spoilers, splitters, etc.) was almost entirely copied from the Boss 302R race car. The 19-inch black-alloy racing wheels were 9-inches wide in the and 9.5-inches in rear, and came with 255/40-19 / 285/35-19 Pirelli P-Zero tires.

Ford produced just over 3250 Boss 302 base models in both 2012 and 2013.

=== Laguna Seca edition ===
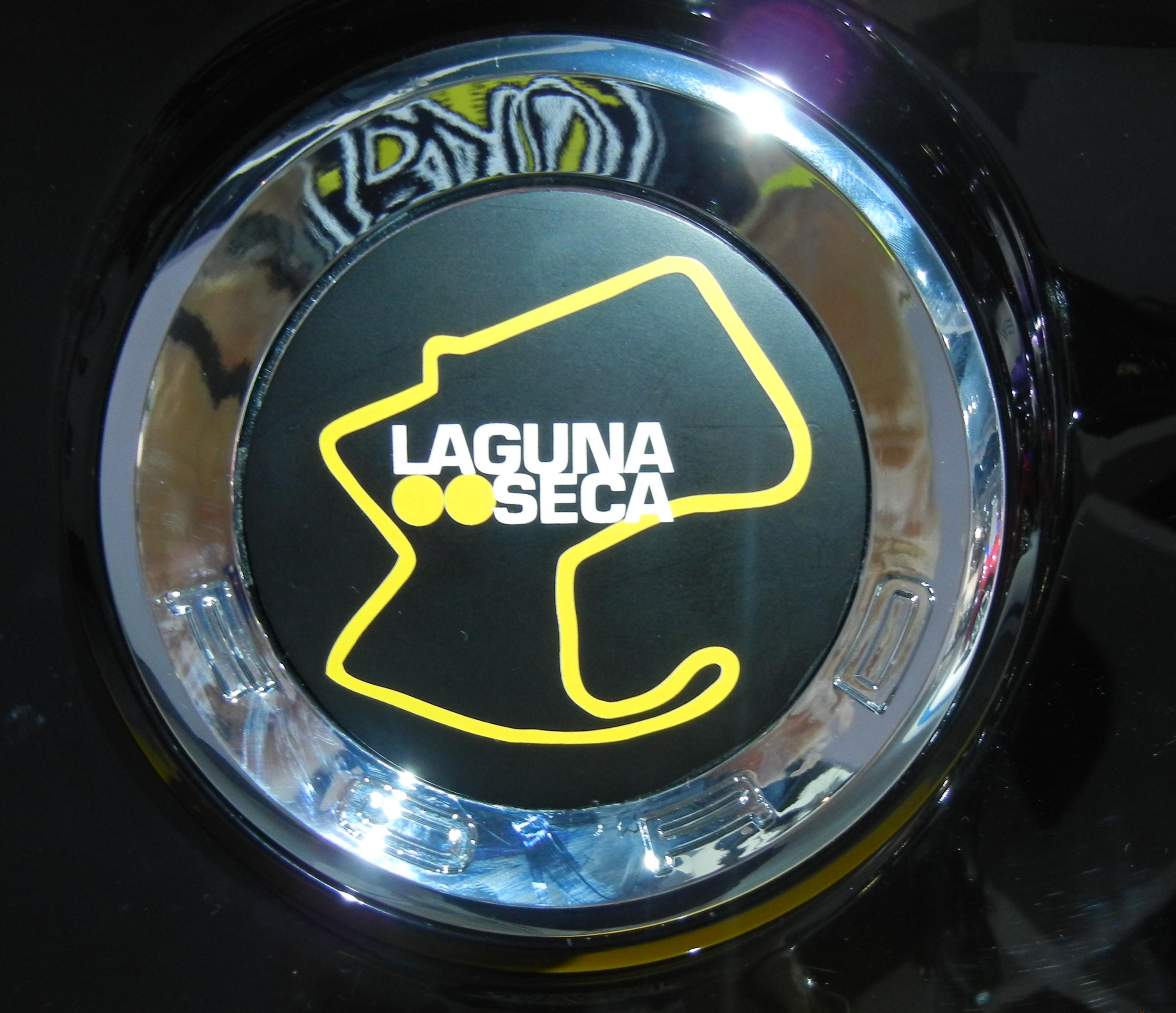
The Laguna Seca edition featured a map of the track on the rear badge

The Boss 302 Laguna Seca edition is an upgraded version of the standard Boss 302 named after the famed northern California race track. Designed to bridge the gap between the base Boss 302 and the track-only Boss 302R and 302S, it came with Recaro sport seats, a Torsen limited-slip rear differential, revised suspension tuning, and a larger rear stabilizer. Ford Racing ducts were fitted to the front brakes. Rear seats were replaced by an X-brace to increase lateral structural rigidity approximately 10%. Light-weight alloy wheels are 19x9-inch in front and 19x10 inch rear, fitted with R-compound ultra high-performance 255/40-19 / 285/35-19 tires.

The 2012 Laguna Seca Boss 302 came in black or Ingot Silver, with a red roof and red accents. In 2013 School Bus Yellow replaced silver, with both black and yellow cars getting reflective matte silver stripes. A more aggressive front splitter and a larger rear spoiler increased downforce.

A total of 750 Laguna Seca versions were manufactured.

== See also ==
- Boss 429 Mustang, big-block sibling variant of the Boss 302, produced in 1969 and 1970
