= List of nicknames in motorsport =

Nicknames abound in motorsport. They are frequently applied to the sportspeople, the brands of sports car and other vehicles, the courses, and the competitions and series.

== Vehicles ==
=== Cars ===
When given to roadgoing production cars, this list only includes cars that had nicknames given to them during their racing career

- "Aero Warriors" =
  - 1969 Ford Torino Talladega, NASCAR stocker
  - 1969 Mercury Cyclone Spoiler, NASCAR stocker
  - 1969 Dodge Charger Daytona, NASCAR stocker
  - 1970 Plymouth Superbird, NASCAR stocker
- "Baby" = 1977 Porsche 935/2.0, sportscar
- "Baby Bertha" = Gerry Marshall's 1975 Vauxhall Firenza Droopsnoot
- "Back in Black" = 1991 Racing Beat Mazda RX-7 FD3S, land speed record car (Note: referring to its color scheme when the car was rebuilt following its infamous 1992 Bonneville crash)
- "Baby Grands" = Dodge Dart, touring car (Note: As they were built similar to the stock car racers used in the NASCAR Grand National)
- "Batmobile" =
  - BMW 3.0 CSL, touring car
  - McLaren M8D, Can-Am sportscar
  - Panoz GTR-1, grand tourer sportscar racer
- "Belgrano" = Toleman TG181 (Note: Nicknamed for its tendency to leak fuel, a clear reference to the warship that sunk during the Falklands War.)
- "Big Bertha" = Gerry Marshall's 1974 Vauxhall Ventora
- "Big Sam" = 1971 Samuri Engineering Datsun 240Z, sportscar
- "Boy Racer" = Ford Mustang FR500 (Note: Given by Ford executive)
- "The Brute of the Brutes" = 1956 Ferrari 410 Sport, sportscar (Note: Given by Carroll Shelby)
- "Le camion le plus vite du monde" (French: "The world's fastest truck") = 1925 Bentley Speed Six, sportscar (Note: given as an insult by Ettore Bugatti, owner of arch rival Bugatti)
- "Camionette" (French: Breadvan) =
  - 1961 Ferrari 250 GT Drogo, sportscar
  - 1966 Ford GT "J-Car" prototype, sportscar
- "Can-Am Killer" = 1973 Porsche 917/30, sportscar
- "Clumsy Pup" = Briggs Cunningham's 1950 Cadillac Coupe de Ville, sportscar
- "Cologne Capri" = Any factory backed...
  - Ford Capri RS2600, touring car
  - Ford Capri RS3100, touring car
- "Disco Volante" (Italian: Flying saucer) = 1952 Alfa Romeo 6C 34, sportscar
- "Ensalada" (Spanish: Salad) = Ak Miller's El Caballo de Hierro, sportscar/hot rod
- "The Flying Brick" =
  - 1977 BMW 320 Turbo, sportscar
  - 1984–1986 Volvo 240 Turbo, touring car
- "Godzilla" = Nissan Skyline GT-R R32, touring car
- "The Great White Whale" = 1969 Chaparral 2H, sportscar
- "GT40" = 1964 Ford GT, sportscar (Note: Named for its height (40 inches))
- "Gurke" (German: Cucumber) = Manfred von Brauchitsch's 1932 Mercedes-Benz SSKL , Land speed record car
- "Hippie Car" = 1970 Porsche 917LH, sportscar
- "Hondola" = Honda RA300, Formula One car
- "Hog" = 1956 Ferrari 410 Sport, sportscar (Note: Given by Carroll Shelby)
- "The King of Africa" = Toyota Celica Twin-cam Turbo (TA64), rally car (Note: in reference to its success in African rallies)
- "The King of Cars" = Mitsubishi Lancer 1600 GSR, rally car (Note: in reference to its success in African rallies)
- "J-Car" = 1966 Ford GT prototype, sportscar (Note: Later became known as the "Ford GT Mk. IV")
- "Mefistofele" (Italian: Monster) = 1908 Fiat SB 4, land speed record car
- "Moby Dick" = 1978 Porsche 935/78, sportscar
- "Le Monstre" (French: The Monster) = Briggs Cunningham's 1950 Cadillac "Spider", sportscar
- "The Mormon Meteor" = 1935 Duesenberg SJ Speedster, land speed record car
- "Old Nail" =
  - Gerry Marshall's 1973 Vauxhall Firenza
  - Jack Brabham's 1966 Brabham BT19
- "La Petite Pitaud" (French: The Little Elephant) = Briggs Cunningham's 1950 Cadillac Coupe de Ville, sportscar racer
- "Pig" = Toleman TG181 (Note: Nicknamed for its poor handling)
- "Psychedelic Porsche" = 1970 Porsche 917LH, sportscar
- "Rosa Sau" (German: "Pink Pig") = 1971 Porsche 917/20, sportscar
- "Rote Sau" (German: Red Sow) = 1971 AMG Mercedes-Benz 300 SEL 6.3, touring car racer
- "SEFAC Hot Rod" = 1961 Ferrari 250 GT SWB Competizione, grand tourer sportscar racer
- "Sharknose" = 1961/62 Ferrari 156, F1 racer
- "Silberpfeile" (German: Silver Arrows) =
  - 1934 Mercedes-Benz W25, Grand Prix racecar
  - 1934 Auto Union Type B, Grand Prix racecar
  - 1936/37 Auto Union Type C, Grand Prix racecar
  - 1938 Auto Union Type D, Grand Prix racecar
  - 1938 Mercedes-Benz W125, Grand Prix racecar
  - 1937/39 Mercedes-Benz W154, Grand Prix racecar
  - 1937/39 Mercedes-Benz W163, Grand Prix racecar
  - 1939 Mercedes-Benz W165, voiturette racecar
  - 1952 Mercedes-Benz W194, sportscar
  - 1954/55 Mercedes-Benz W196, Formula One racecar
  - 1955 Mercedes-Benz 300 SLR, sportscar
  - 1989 Sauber C9, sportscar
  - 1990 Mercedes-Benz C11, sportscar
  - 1991 Mercedes-Benz C291, sportscar
  - 1997 Mercedes-Benz CLK GTR, grand tourer
  - 1998 Mercedes-Benz CLK LM, grand tourer
  - 1999 Mercedes-Benz CLR, grand tourer
  - 1999 Audi R8C, sportscar
  - 1999 Audi R8R, sportscar
  - 2010 Mercedes MGP W01, Formula One racecar
  - 2011 Mercedes MGP W02, Formula One racecar
  - 2012 Mercedes F1 W03, Formula One racecar
  - 2013 Mercedes F1 W04, Formula One racecar
  - 2014 Mercedes F1 W05 Hybrid, Formula One racecar
  - 2015 Mercedes F1 W06 Hybrid, Formula One racecar
  - 2016 Mercedes F1 W07 Hybrid, Formula One racecar
  - 2017 Mercedes-AMG F1 W08 EQ Power+, Formula One racecar
  - 2018 Mercedes AMG F1 W09 EQ Power+, Formula One racecar
  - 2019 Mercedes AMG F1 W10 EQ Power+, Formula One racecar
  - 2020 Mercedes-AMG F1 W11 EQ Performance, Formula One racecar
- "The Sucker Car" = 1970 Chaparral 2J, sportscar
- "Tank" =
  - 1923 Bugatti Type 32, Grand Prix racecar
  - 1936 Bugatti Type 57G, sportscar
  - 1939 Bugatti Type 57C, sportscar
- "Tank de Tours" = 1923 Bugatti Type 32, Grand Prix racecar
- "Tide Ride" =
  - 1986–1989 Chevrolet Monte Carlo, NASCAR stocker
  - 1990–1993 Chevrolet Lumina, NASCAR stocker
  - 1994–1996 Ford Thunderbird, NASCAR stocker
  - 1997–1999 Ford Taurus, NASCAR stocker
  - 2000–2003 Pontiac Grand Prix, NASCAR stocker
  - 2004–2006 Chevrolet Monte Carlo, NASCAR stocker
- "Der Truffeljäger von Zuffenhausen" (German: The Trufflehunter of Zuffenhausen) = 1970 Porsche 917LH, sportscar
- "Turbo Panzer" = 1973 Porsche 917/30, sportscar
- "Wing Warriors" =
  - 1969 Dodge Charger Daytona, NASCAR stocker
  - 1970 Plymouth Superbird, NASCAR stocker
- "The Vacuum Cleaner" = 1970 Chaparral 2J, sportscar
- "Weißer Elefant" (German: White Elephant) = Rudolf Caracciola's 1931 Mercedes-Benz SSKL, sportscar
- "Wunderwagen" (German: Wondercar) = Zakspeed Ford Capri Turbo, sportscar
- "Yellow Submarine" = 1980 Chaparral 2K, Indycar

=== Motorcycles ===
- "Boy racer" = AJS 7R
- "Never Ready" = Honda NR500
- "Roton" = Norton NRS588 (Note: portmanteau of rotary, its power output and Crighton, after Norton's team development chief, Brian Crighton)
- "Silver Fish" = Norton Kneeler

=== Motorboats ===
- "The Beer Wagon" = Miss Budweiser, unlimited hydroplane
- "Bubble-Bud" = Miss Budweiser, unlimited hydroplane (Note: In reference to the revolutionary enclosed canopy which became common in hydroplane racing)
- "The Checkerboard Comet" = Miss Bardahl, unlimited hydroplane
- "The Coniston Slipper" = Bluebird K4, water speed record hydroplane

=== Engines ===
- "Double Knocker" = Norton Manx

== Machine types ==
- "Dinoboat" = Unlimited Hydroplane
- "Thunderboat" = Unlimited Hydroplane

== Teams ==
- "The Prancing Horse", "The Red Devil" = Scuderia Ferrari
- "The Big Two" =
  - Scuderia Ferrari
  - McLaren
- "Super Best Friends" = Super Aguri F1
- "PSG of Formula One", "The Silver Arrows" = Mercedes

== Events ==
- "36 Hours of Florida" (Note: Given as until 1998, both ran under the same championship, also the Sebring race traditionally followed Daytona.) =
  - 24 Hours of Daytona
  - 12 Hours of Sebring
- "The Car Breaker" = Safari Rally
- "The Garden Party of the Gods" = Goodwood Festival of Speed
- "The Goodwood of the North" = Oulton Park Gold Cup, (United Kingdom)
- "Gravel Grand Prix" = 1000 Lakes Rally
- "The Great Race" = Bathurst 1000
- "Jyväskylä Grand Prix" = 1000 Lakes Rally
- "Jyväskylän Suurajot" (Finnish: the "Jyväskylä Great Race") = 1000 Lakes Rally
- "The Race to the Clouds" = Pikes Peak International Hill Climb
- "Rallye des 10000 Virages" (French: "Ten Thousand Turns Rally") = Tour de Corse

== Series ==
- "The Bruce and Denny Show" (Note: Given for their dominance in the series.) = Canadian American Challenge Cup (Note: Given during their time as McLaren Can-Am drivers)
- "Can-Am" = Canadian American Challenge Cup
- "Carrera Cup" = World Championship for Makes
- "Crash Masters" = Fastmasters (Note: Given for its accident prone nature of the race, due to it taking place on unsuitable circuit.)
- "Ducati Cup" = Superbike World Championship(insult) (Note: Given for their dominance of, and the large number of privateer teams running Ducati bikes in the category.)
- "Europa League of Motorsport" = Formula One (Insult)
- "FIA Formula Conference League" = Formula 2 (Insult)
- "Champions League of Motorcycle Racing" = MotoGP (Insult)
- "The Greatest Free Show on Earth" = Irish Tarmac Rally Championship

== Courses ==
- "The Action Track" = Richmond International Raceway
- "The Augusta National of race tracks" = Martinsville Speedway, (United States)
- "The Brickyard" = Indianapolis Motor Speedway, (United States)
- "The Cathedral of Speed" = TT Circuit Assen, (Netherlands)
- "The Crown Jewel of Canada" = Cayuga Speedway,
- "The Devil’s Triangle" = Pocono International Raceway, (United States)
- "The dusty place" = Riverside International Raceway, (United States)
- "Eifelring" = Nürburgring GP-Strecke, (Germany) (Note: Given by spectators as they felt that the official name belonged to the original circuit, not that of the new layout.)
- "Ersatzring" = Nürburgring GP-Strecke, (Germany) (Note: Given as an insult by spectators who regard it as a poor substitute to the original because they were seated farther away to the original layout)
- "The Glen" = Watkins Glen International, (United States)
- "The Goodwood of the North"
  - Aintree Motor Racing Circuit, (United Kingdom)
  - Oulton Park, (United Kingdom)
- "The Grand Old Lady" = Lakewood Speedway, (United States)
- "The Great American Speedway" = Texas Motor Speedway, (United States)
- "The Green Hell" = Nürburgring, (Germany)
- "Green Party Ring" = Nürburgring GP-Strecke, (Germany) (Note: Given as an insult by spectators who regard it as a poor substitute to the original because they were seated farther away to the original layout)
- "Home of British Motor Racing" = Silverstone Circuit, (United Kingdom) (Note: Given for the fact that BDRC is the circuit owner)
- "House of Drift" = Toyota Speedway at Irwindale, (United States) (Note: given due to its popularity with the sport)
- "The House that Dan Gurney built" = Riverside International Raceway, (United States)
- "The Indianapolis of the East" =
  - Thompson International Speedway, (United States)
  - Langhorne Speedway, (United States)
- "The Indianapolis of the South" = Lakewood Speedway, (United States)
- "The Indianapolis of the West" =
  - Corona Road Race, (United States)
  - Ontario Motor Speedway, (United States)
- "Jewel of the Desert" = Phoenix International Speedway, (United States)
- "The Lady in Black" = Darlington Raceway, (United States)
- "The Magic Mile" = New Hampshire Motor Speedway, (United States)
- "Millen's Mountain" = Pikes Peak International Hill Climb, (United States)
- "The Mini-Nürburgring" = Cadwell Park, (United Kingdom)
- "The Monster Mile" = Dover International Speedway, (United States)
- "The Mountain" = Mount Panorama Circuit, (Australia)
- "Mountain High Racing" = Westwood Motorsport Park, (Canada)
- "The Paperclip" =
  - Martinsville Speedway, (United States)
  - Queensland Raceway, (Australia)
- "Puke Alley" = Langhorne Speedway, (United States)
- "The Ring" = Nürburgring, (Germany)
- "The Rock"
  - Rockingham Motor Speedway, (United Kingdom)
  - Rockingham Dragway, (United States)
- "Southern Hemisphere’s Isle of Man" = Cemetery Circuit, (New Zealand)
- "The Temple of Speed" = Monza Circuit, (Italy)
- "The Thunderdome" = Calder Park Raceway, (Australia)
- "Thunder Valley" = Bristol Motor Speedway, (United States)
- "The Track Too Tough To Tame" = Darlington Raceway, (United States)
- "The Track That Ate the Heroes" = Langhorne Speedway, (United States)
- "The Tricky Triangle" = Pocono International Raceway, (United States)
- "White Lightning" = Dover International Speedway, (United States)
- "World Center of Racing" = Daytona International Speedway, (United States)

=== Sections ===
- "The Big Left Turn" = Langhorne Speedway, (United States)
- "Gilligan's Island" = Temporary pitroad of Infineon Raceway
- "Haug-Hook" = Nürburgring GP-Strecke
- "Mur du Québec" (French: Quebec Wall) = Wall of Champions of Circuit Gilles Villeneuve
- "Turkish Corkscrew" = Turn 1 of Istanbul Park
- "Faux Rouge" = The uphill kink in the middle of the back straight of Istanbul Park
- "Night of the Long Knives" = "Night of Turini" stage of the Monte Carlo Rally (Note: due to the strong high beam lights cutting through the night.)

== Others ==
- "Hollywood of motorsport" = Mid-south of England
- "The Nick Hogan Rule" = Formula D new drivers' licensing (insult)
- "The Matt Kenseth Rule" = The Chase for the Cup (insult)

== Organizations ==
- "International Marijuana Smuggling Association" = International Motor Sports Association (during 1980's scandals involving IMSA drivers) (Note: Given as an insult as notable drivers (John Paul, Sr., John Paul, Jr. Randy Lanier, and the Whittington Brothers) who raced in their series were arrested for illegal drug trade participation in the 1980s)"Top 10 sports scams – cheating and great sport scandals". Bumeral.net. 23 April 2008. Archived from the original on 8 March 2009.)
- "Ferrari International Assistance" = Fédération Internationale de l'Automobile (Insult)

== See also ==
- Lists of nicknames – nickname list articles on Wikipedia
