= Mercury Cyclone Spoiler II =

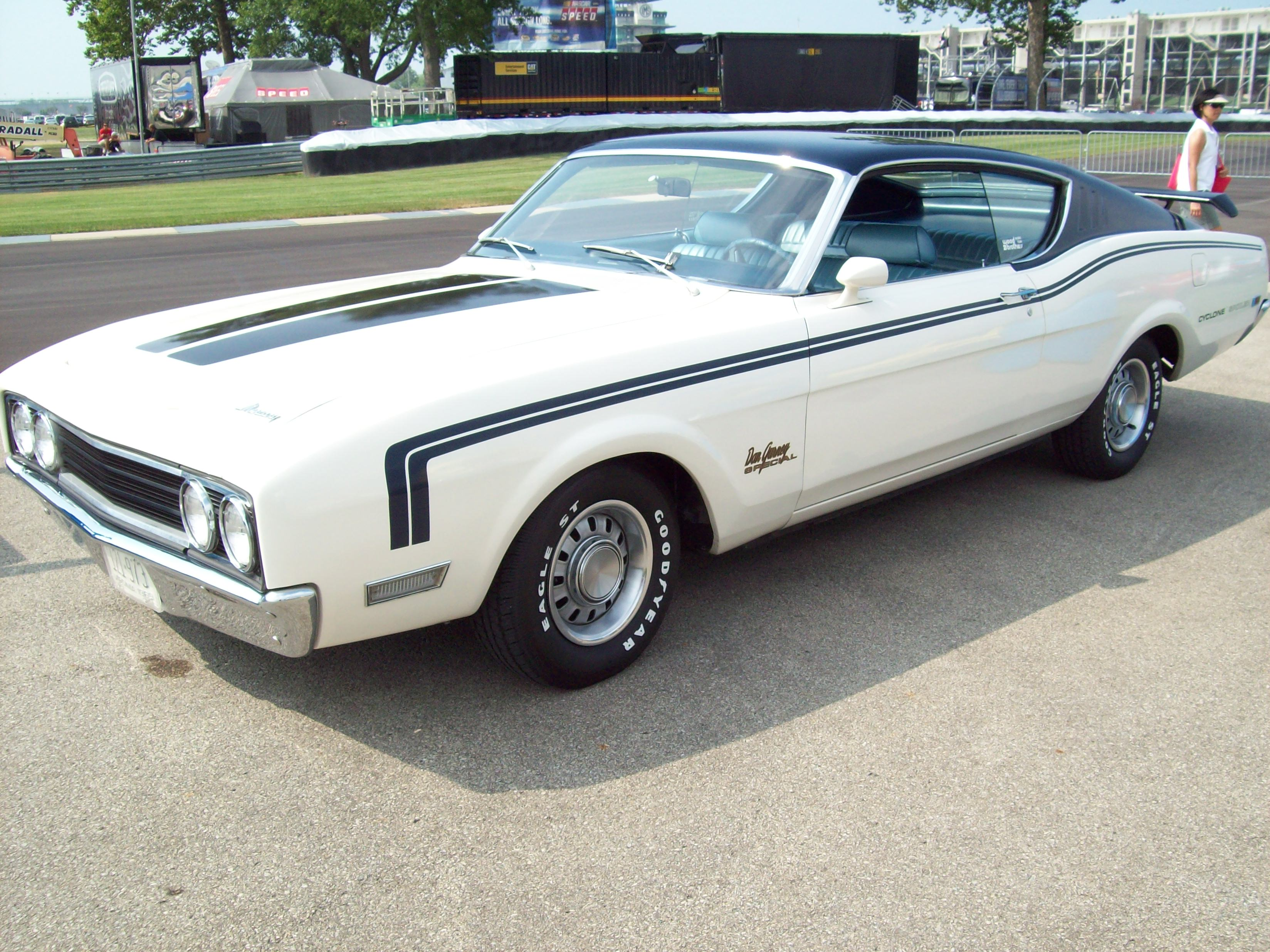

Overview
- Manufacturer: Mercury (Ford)
- Also called: Ford Torino Talladega
- Production: 1969
- Model years: 1969
- Designer: Larry Shinoda

Body and chassis
- Class: Race car/Muscle Car
- Body style: 2-door hardtop fastback
- Layout: FR layout

The Mercury Cyclone Spoiler II is a muscle car that was produced by Mercury in early 1969. The Mercury Cyclone Spoiler II was a special, more aerodynamic version of the Mercury Cyclone. It was produced specifically to compete against the Dodge Charger Daytona and Plymouth Superbird produced by Chrysler, and the nearly identical Ford Torino Talladega, in NASCAR stock car racing, and was sold to the public only because homologation rules required a minimum number of cars (500 in 1969) be produced and made available for sale to the public. A total of 503 cars were built in both Yarborough (285) and Gurney (215) versions, a during the first few weeks of 1969.

== Production ==
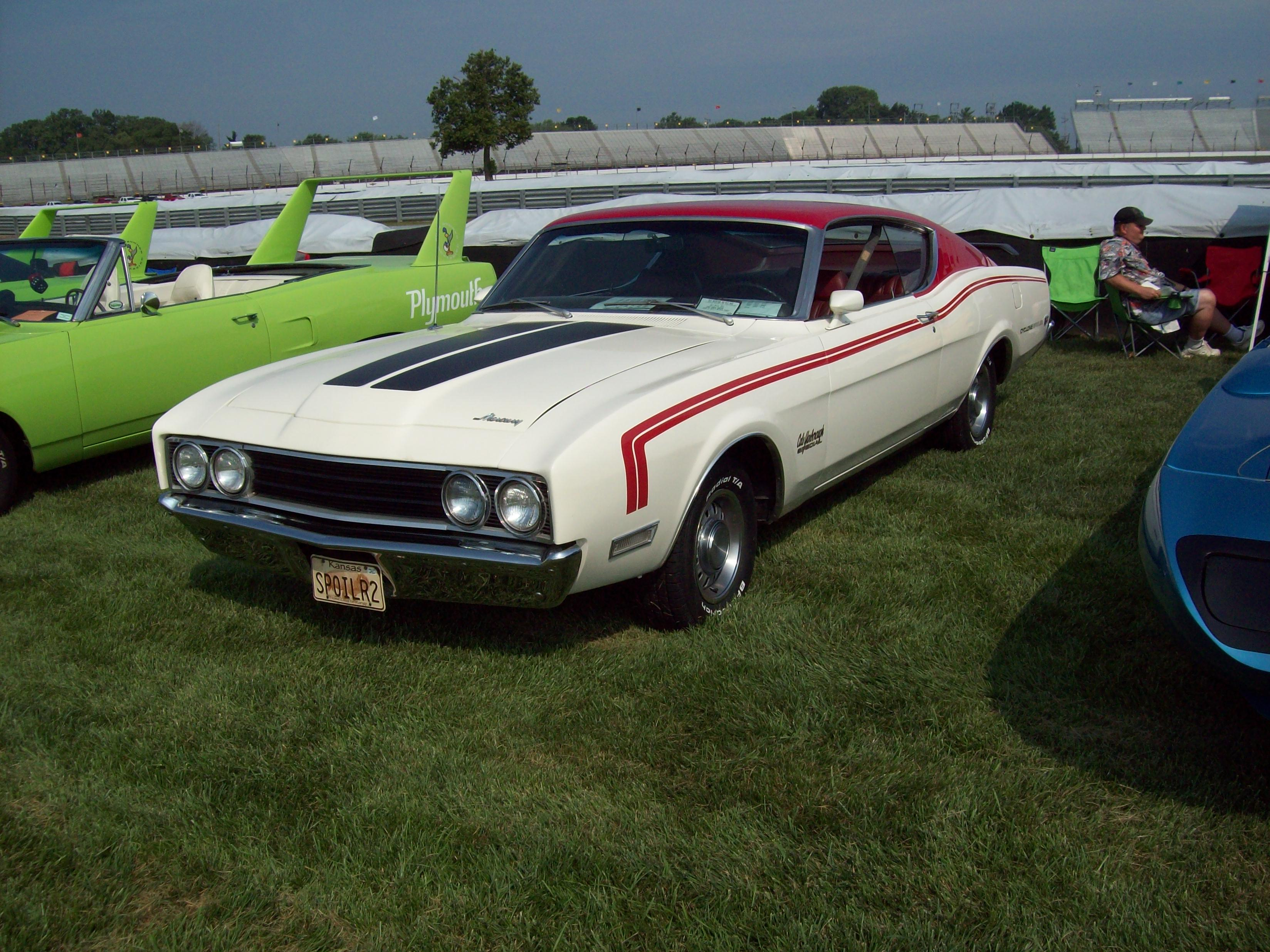
Cale Yarborough Spoiler II

The Mercury Cyclone Spoiler II was built in only two trim packages: The Cale Yarborough Special - a white car with red interior and exterior trim, and the Dan Gurney Special - a white car with blue interior and trim. A largely equivalent vehicle was also produced by Ford as the Torino Talladega.

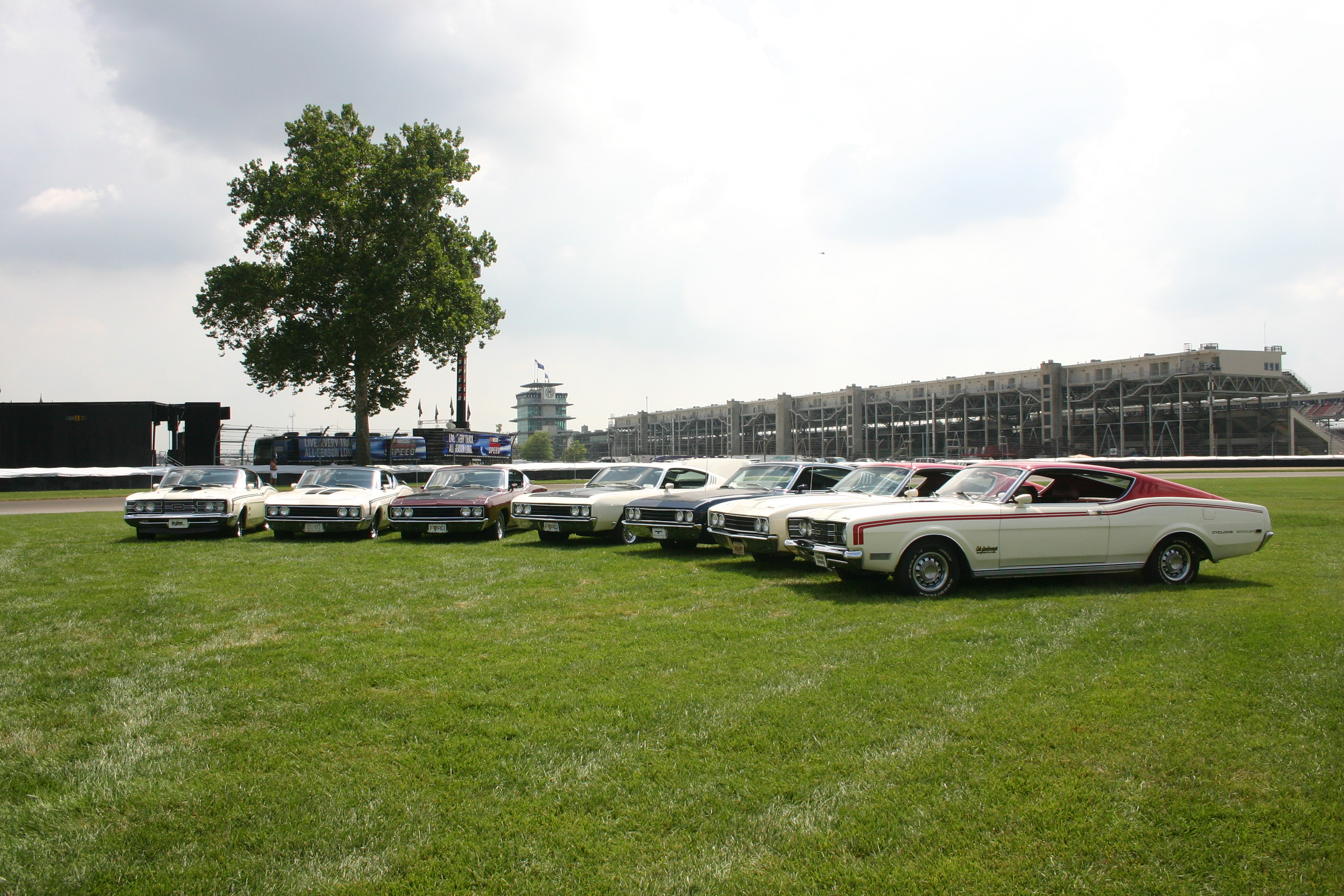
Cyclone Spoilers, Spoiler IIs, and Talladegas in Indy

The 1969 Mercury Cyclone Spoiler II was based on the Mercury Cyclone "Sportsroof" (Ford's trade name for a fastback) 2-door hardtop. To make the car more aerodynamic at high speeds, a sleeker front section was added. Regular production Mercury Cyclones had a then-fashionable inset grille and headlights, which fared poorly in the wind tunnel. The Mercury Cyclone Spoiler II had this nose replaced with one that extended the car's length by about six inches, with a flush-mounted grille identical to that used on the Ford Torino Talladega giving it a much more aerodynamic front end. In a well kept, secret design move, the rocker panels were reshaped and rolled to allow Mercury teams to run their racing cars about an inch closer to the ground while staying within NASCAR rules; this also greatly enhanced the top speed of the car by lowering its center of gravity, and further reducing its wind resistance. All production (homologation) models of the Mercury Cyclone Spoiler II were equipped with a 351 Windsor engine, automatic on the column, and front bench seat.

== Racing ==
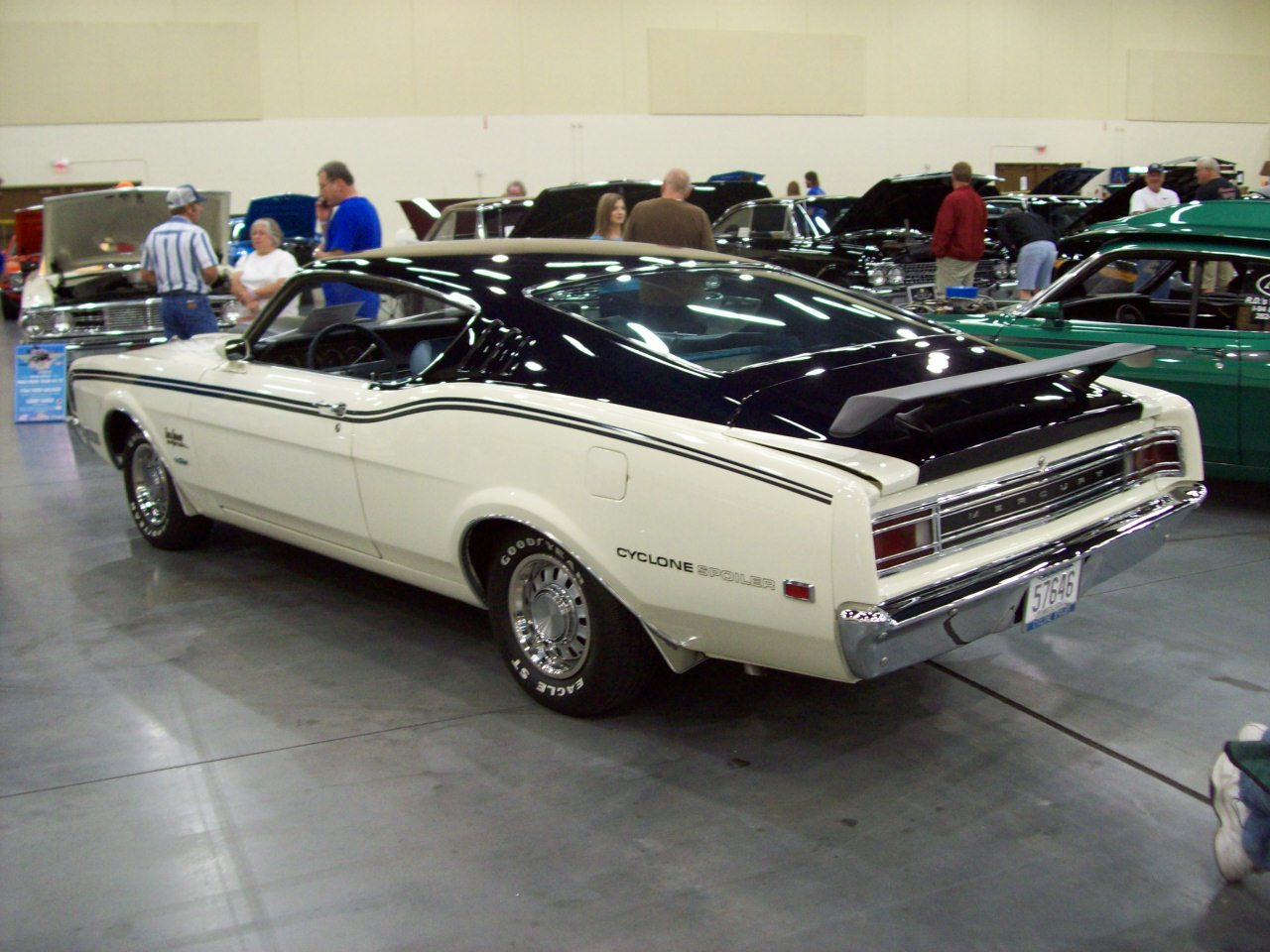
Cyclone Spoiler II in Dan Gurney Trim

Racing versions of the car were initially fitted with the Ford FE 427 side oiler engine that had been Ford's main racing engine since 1963. Later in the season, the Boss 429 engine was used by many of the teams, after it had finally been declared "officially homologated" by NASCAR president, Bill France. The Boss 429 engine was homologated in the 1969 Ford Mustang Boss 429. In a very unusual move, Ford homologated the engine separately from the car in which it was to race. Many experts think this may have been done in order to get the bodywork of the Mercury Cyclone Spoiler II officially homologated at the beginning of the 1969 race season, as the Boss 429 was not yet in production in sufficient numbers to homologate it.

A prototype of the Cyclone Spoiler II had exposed headlights where the front nose resembled the one based on the Datsun 240Z.

The Mercury Cyclone Spoiler II was very successful on the racing circuit: winning 8 Grand National races during the 1969 and 1970 NASCAR seasons - matching the total number of wins recorded by the 1970 Plymouth Superbird.

One important footnote: 1969 was Ford's last year of factory involvement, and/or support, in racing of any kind for several years. Following Congressional hearings in which they were questioned about the R&D costs of racing vs. improving fuel economy and safety, Ford completely abandoned all of their racing programs, starting with the 1970 season. Subsequently, most of the NASCAR and ARCA race teams, running Mercurys, continued to run their 1969 Mercury Cyclone Spoiler IIs in 1970 without any factory support, when it became apparent that their Spoiler IIs were aerodynamically superior to the 1970 Mercurys that Ford intended to be their replacement. After the 1970 season, NASCAR effectively banned the "aero cars", by restricting all four of the limited aero "production" cars to having to compete with engines no larger than 305 cubic inches of displacement (vs. the 426, 427, & 429 inches that the other cars could run), and the competitive history of the Mercury Cyclone Spoiler II (and its aerowarrior rivals) was essentially over.

== Collectibility ==
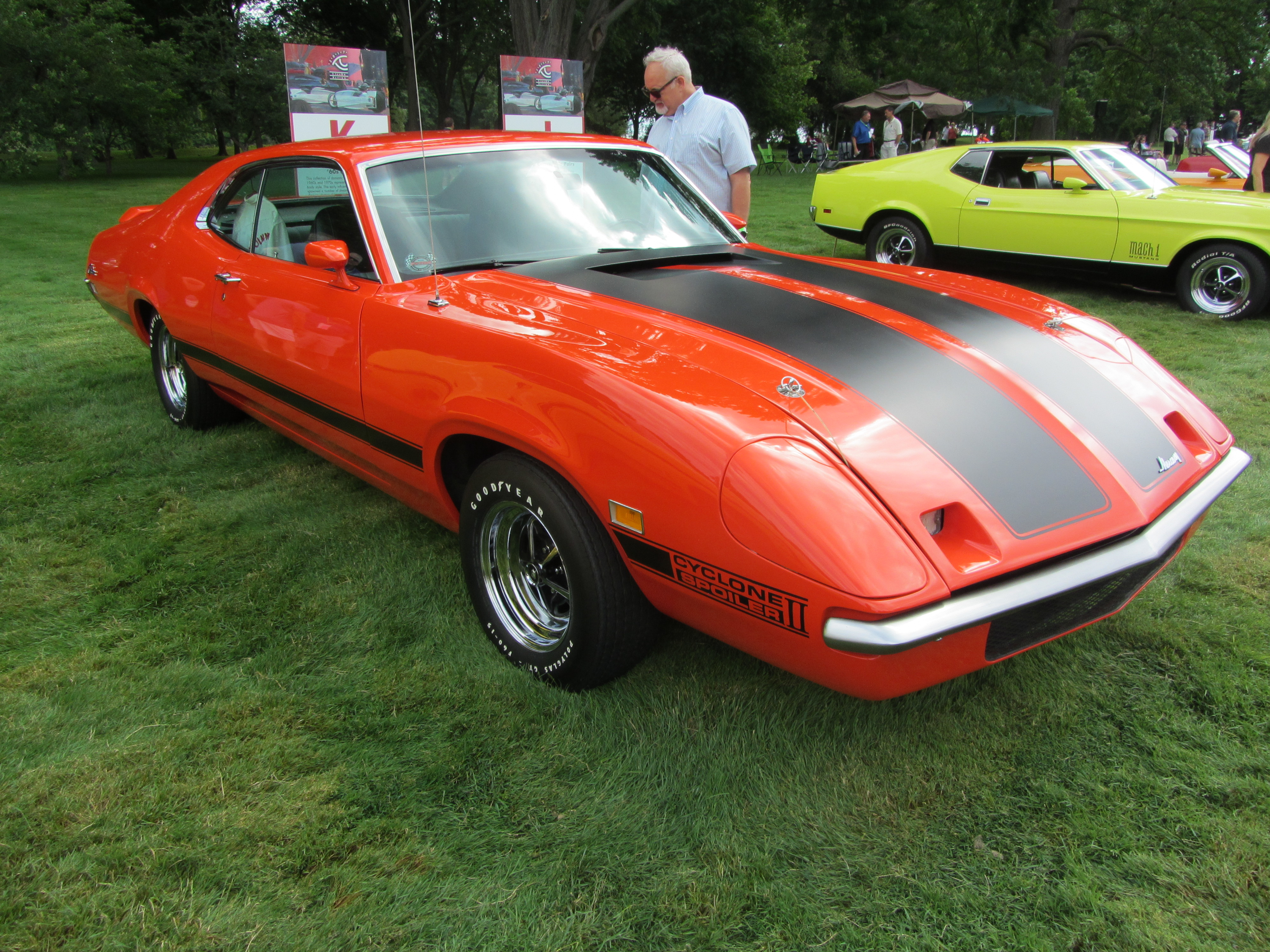
1970 Spoiler II

Today, the Cyclone Spoiler II is considered a collectible car. It was a special purpose built vehicle (some have even called it a "showroom race car") with a strong racing history, that achieved great success during the Aero Wars. Their values have not risen as high as the Mopar "aero cars", in spite of their rarity and their track successes during the Aero Wars years. Some experts have assumed that this was due to the sheer outrageousness of the Dodge Charger Daytona and the Plymouth Superbird, with their huge rear wings; as the MOPAR winged cars' prices have eclipsed the far more subtle bodywork of the Mercury Cyclone Spoiler II.
