= Aero Warriors =

Class of historical car

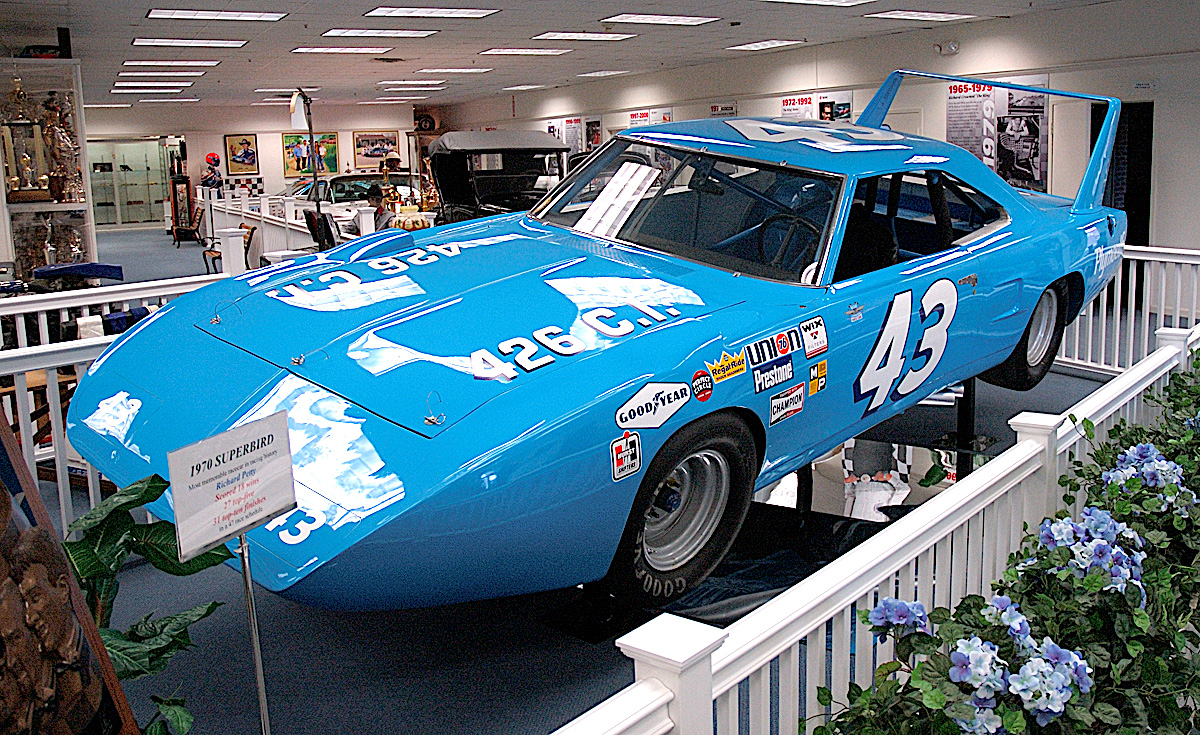
Richard Petty's Superbird at the Petty Museum

Aero Warriors, also called aero-cars, is a nickname for four muscle cars developed specifically to race on the NASCAR circuit by Dodge, Plymouth, Ford and Mercury for the 1969 and 1970 racing seasons. The cars were based on production stock cars but had additional aerodynamic features.

The first Aero Warrior was the 1969 Ford Torino Talladega. The Torino already had a fastback design; the Talladega added a longer, slightly rounded front end. The second Aero Warrior was the 1969 Mercury Cyclone Spoiler II. The Cyclone was nearly identical to the Torino with the only major distinctions being the front grille and rear tail lights. Another aero car is the Dodge Charger Daytona, which was a redesign of the Charger 500 and had a more radical aerodynamic nose as well as a high-mounted wing at the rear, hitting 243 mph (391 km/h) on Chrysler's five-mile oval track. The final Aero Warrior was the 1970 Plymouth Superbird (based on the Plymouth Road Runner), which had the same aerodynamic additions as the Daytona. Because of their wings, the Mopar Aero Warriors are sometimes called the Winged Warriors.

Due to NASCAR homologation rules a minimum number (500) of these cars had to be offered for sale to the public so there are approximately 3,000 of these cars in private ownership. The Aero Warriors were successful in winning many races, but NASCAR made rule changes that equalized the advantages in 1971.

Chrysler had funded testing of their new 1971 designs at Wichita State University's wind tunnel. The team used 3/8-scale models of Chargers and Road Runners and fitted them with an array of wings, nose cones, and other aero bits, but it became a wasted effort when NASCAR effectively banned the winged cars from competition.

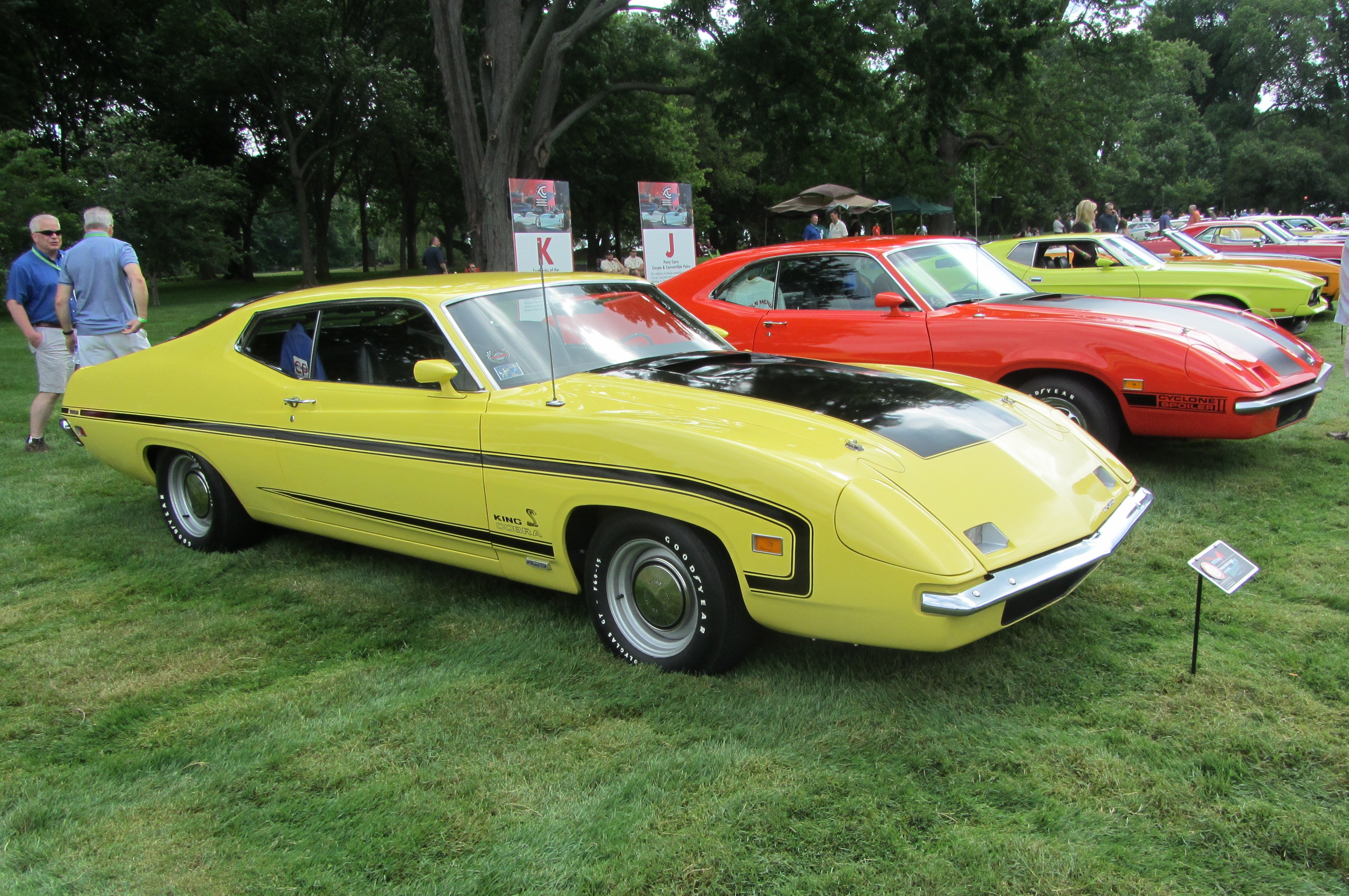
Prototype Ford Torino King Cobra and 1970 Mercury Cyclone Spoiler II on display

Ford had also planned to introduce 1971 versions of their Aero Warriors, named the King Cobra and Mercury Cyclone Spoiler II, based upon their new for 1971 body-styles, but with a long aerodynamic nose (similar to the Daytona and the Superbird). As with Chrysler, due to the NASCAR rule changes, the project was abandoned. However, three prototype cars were produced and are today considered highly prized due to their rarity.

== Legacy ==
Every five years, fans and owners of Aero Warriors gather to celebrate the legacy of the rare vehicles. The 2019 Wing Car Reunion was held at Talladega Speedway, and in October, Aero Warrior cars completed laps at Atlanta Motor Speedway to celebrate the vehicles' 50th anniversary.
