= Mercury Cyclone =

Car model

Mercury (Comet) Cyclone
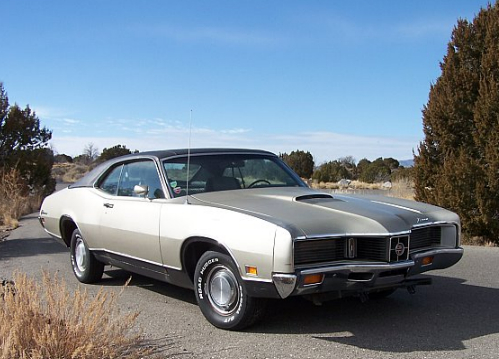
- 1971 Mercury Cyclone GT

Overview
- Manufacturer: Mercury (Ford)
- Model years: 1964–1971

Body and chassis
- Class: Muscle car
- Body style: 2-door coupe 2-door convertible
- Layout: FR layout
- Related: Mercury Comet; Ford Fairlane; Mercury Montego; Ford Torino Talladega

Chronology
- Predecessor: Mercury S-22
- Successor: Mercury Cougar XR-7 (indirect)

The Mercury Cyclone is an automobile that was marketed by the Mercury division of Ford from 1964 to 1971. Introduced in 1964 as the Mercury Comet Cyclone, the Cyclone replaced the S-22 as the performance-oriented version of the Mercury Comet model line. The Cyclone became a distinct nameplate for the 1968 model year, as the Mercury Montego was phased in to replace the Comet.

Within Mercury, the Cyclone was positioned between the Cougar pony car and the Marquis/Marauder full-size two-doors. Though largely overshadowed by the Cougar, the Cyclone was positioned as a muscle car, representing the Mercury brand in racing as a clone of the Ford Fairlane Thunderbolt.

Four generations of the Cyclone were produced, with production ending after the 1971 model year. For the 1972 model year, the Cyclone returned as an option package for the Montego; only 30 examples were produced. Within the Mercury line, the Cyclone was not directly replaced. The Cougar XR7 was repackaged as a personal luxury version of the Montego for 1974.

== First generation (1964–1965) ==
=== 1964 ===
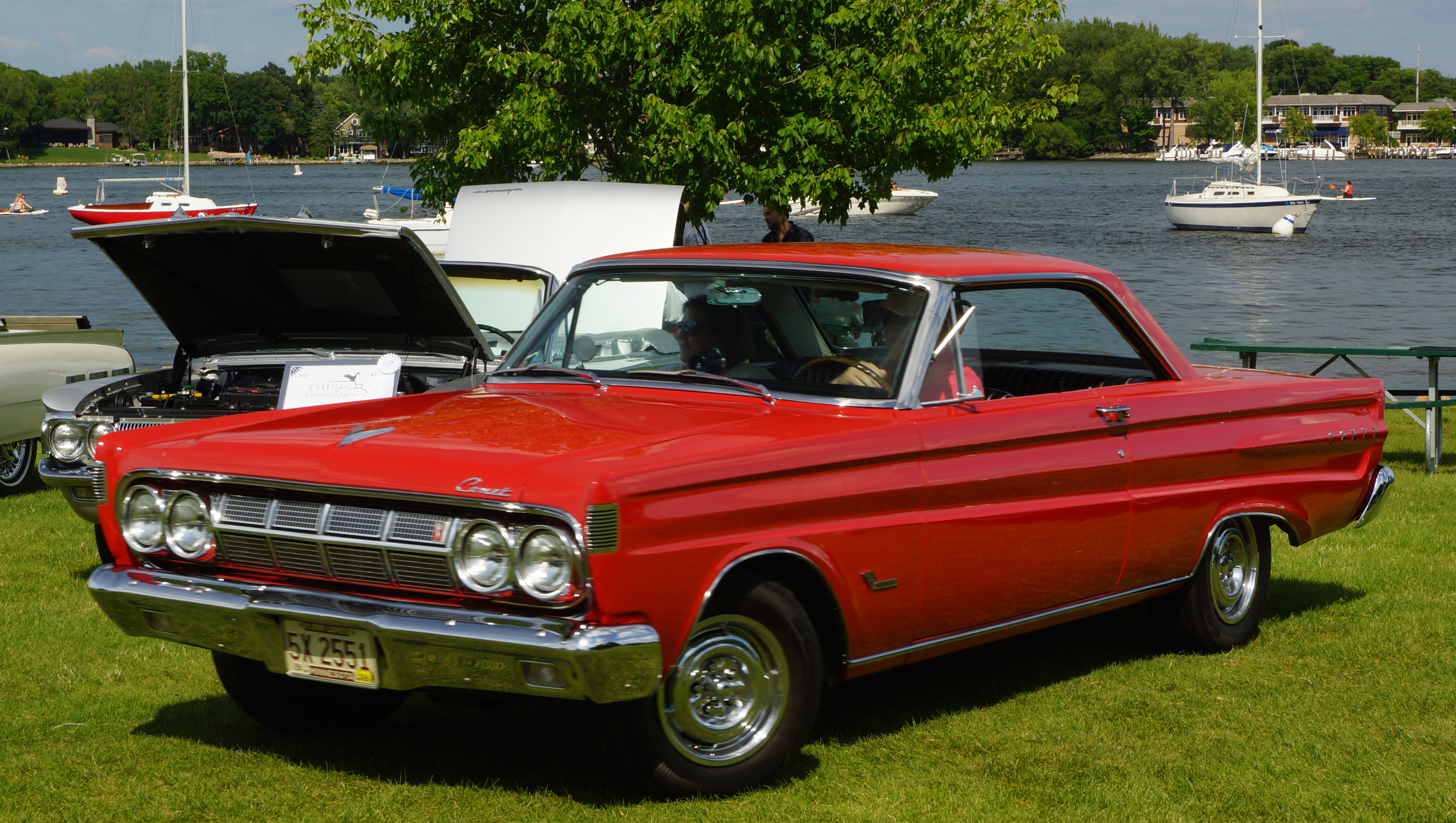
1964 Mercury Comet Cyclone

The Cyclone started as an option for the 1964 Mercury Comet. It featured a 289 cu in (4,736 cc), 210 hp (156.6 kW) engine and a sporty look. It had a spoked steering wheel and bucket seats. Some of the engine parts were chromed.

=== 1965 ===
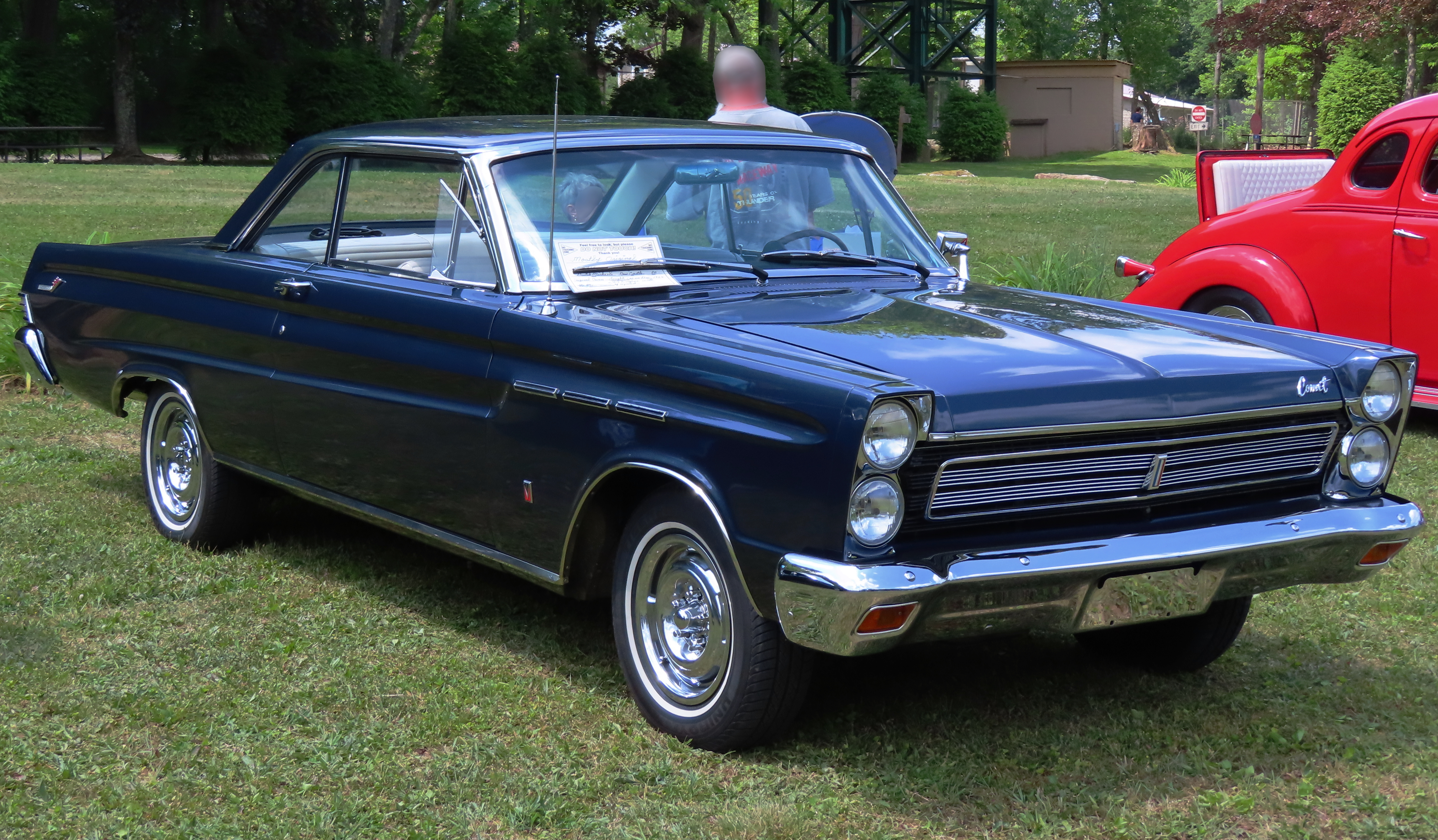
1965 Mercury Comet Cyclone

In the 1965 models, the engine was updated to the four-barrel carbureted version of the 289 cu in (4,736 cc) unit, but generated 200 hp (149.1 kW). This model had a few performance options, which included a handling package, a special fan, and a "power transfer" rear axle. Special features included a black-out, stand-up grille, bucket seats with sewn-through pleats, center console, chrome-plated wheel covers with lug nuts, engine "dress up kit", unique insignias, a vinyl roof in black or white and a "Power-Pac" gauge cluster for the heavily padded instrument panel.

== Second generation (1966–1967) ==
=== 1966 ===
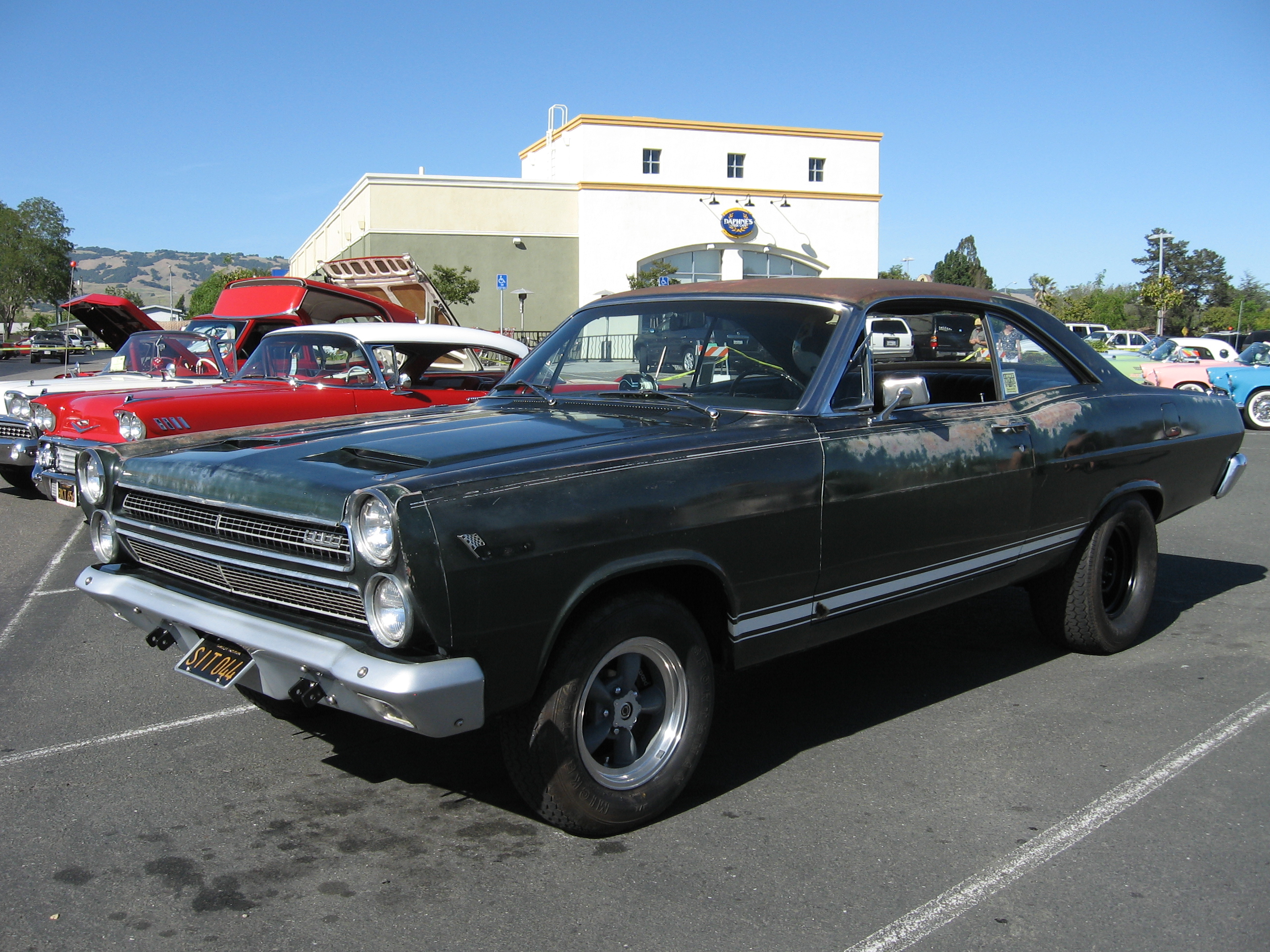
1966 Comet Cyclone

The 1966 models underwent a major styling change. The body received "sculpturing" that ran the length of the car, and was based on the body of the Ford Fairlane. The models introduced new engines. The 390 Y code was a 390 cu in (6,391 cc) engine with a two-barrel carburetor and 265 hp (198 kW). The 390 H code had a four-barrel carburetor and 275 hp (205 kW).

The GT option used a 390 S code engine which was a 390 cu in (6,391 cc) engine with a four-barrel carburetor and 335 hp (250 kW). The GT featured car stripes, a fiberglass hood (bonnet) with two air scoops and several other performance options.

=== 1967 ===
The 1967 model was produced with several engine options. The standard engine was the 289 cu in (4,736 cc) V8 with 200 hp (149 kW). The GT's engine was 390 cu in (6,391 cc), but was quoted with 15 fewer horses at 320 hp (239 kW).

Neither the 1966 Cyclone nor the 1967 Cyclone used the 427 cu in (6,997 cc) Ford FE engine that went into the standard Comet officially from the factory. For Comet Cyclones that were modified by Andy Hotton of Dearborn Steel Tubing with the optional 427 Ford FE 410 hp (306 kW) engine there were no changes to the body work similar to the Ford Fairlane Thunderbolt. Only a small, chromed badge with the designation '427' located on each front fender reflected the larger displacement engine under the hood (bonnet).

== Third generation (1968–1969) ==
=== 1968 ===
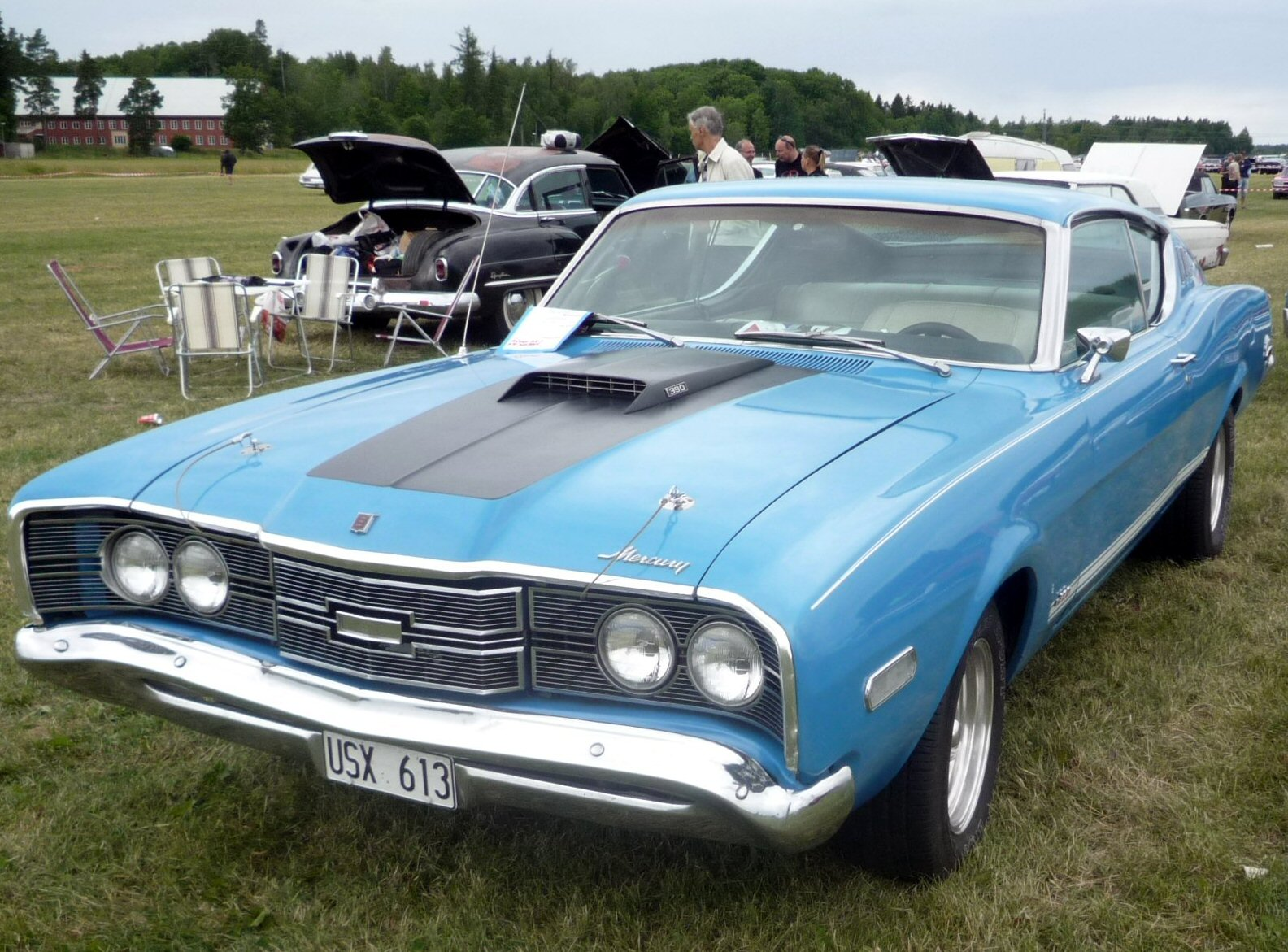
1968 Cyclone

The 1968 models dropped "Comet" from their name. The Cyclones had a mid tire level body tape stripe. The Cyclone GT's had an upper level body stripe, buckets, wide whitewall tires, special wheel covers, all vinyl interior, and the special handling package. It was named the fastest car of that year, because it set a world record speed of 189.22 mph (304.52 km/h) at Daytona.

Several engines were available for the Cyclones:

The 302 cu in (4,949 cc) standard engine was available as either the two-barrel carburetor, which generated 210 hp (157 kW), or the four-barrel carburetor, which generated 230 hp (172 kW).

The 390 cu in (6,391 cc) optional engine (standard for GT) was available as either the two-barrel carburetor, which generated 265 hp (198 kW), or the four-barrel carburetor, which generated 325 hp (242 kW).

The limited production 428CJ became available mid year and was rated 335hp

=== 1969 ===
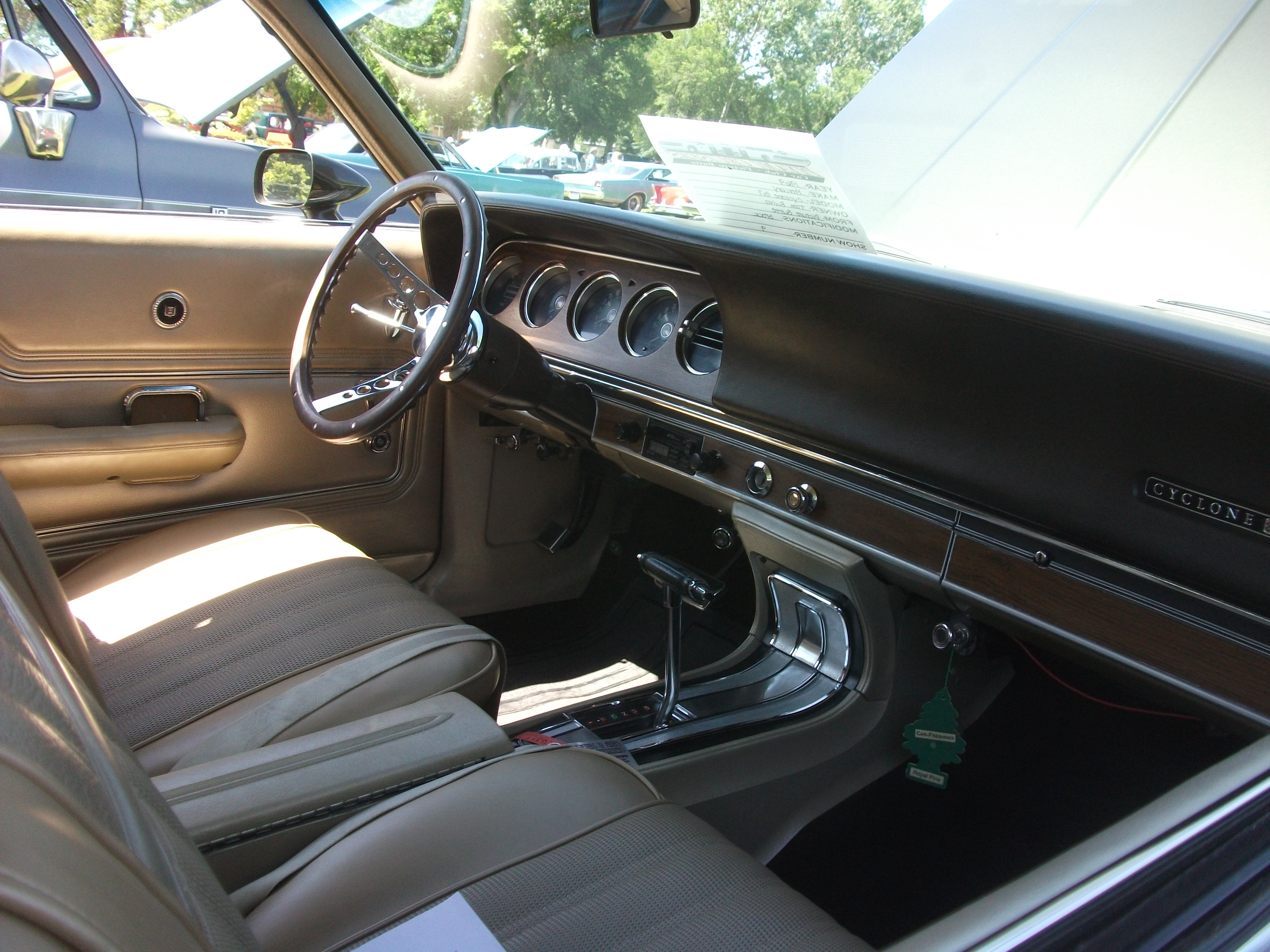
1969 Cyclone GT interior

In 1969, the Cyclones had several engine options:

- The 302 cu in (4,949 cc) engine was available with 220 hp (164 kW).
- The 351 cu in (5,752 cc) engine had two versions: one was 250 hp (186 kW) and the other was 290 hp (216 kW).
- The 390 cu in (6,391 cc) engine for the GTs was available with 320 hp (239 kW).

==== Spoiler ====
There was also a Cyclone Spoiler with a 390 Improved Performance "S" code engine that made 325Hp with the 735cfm Holley Carb

==== Spoiler II ====
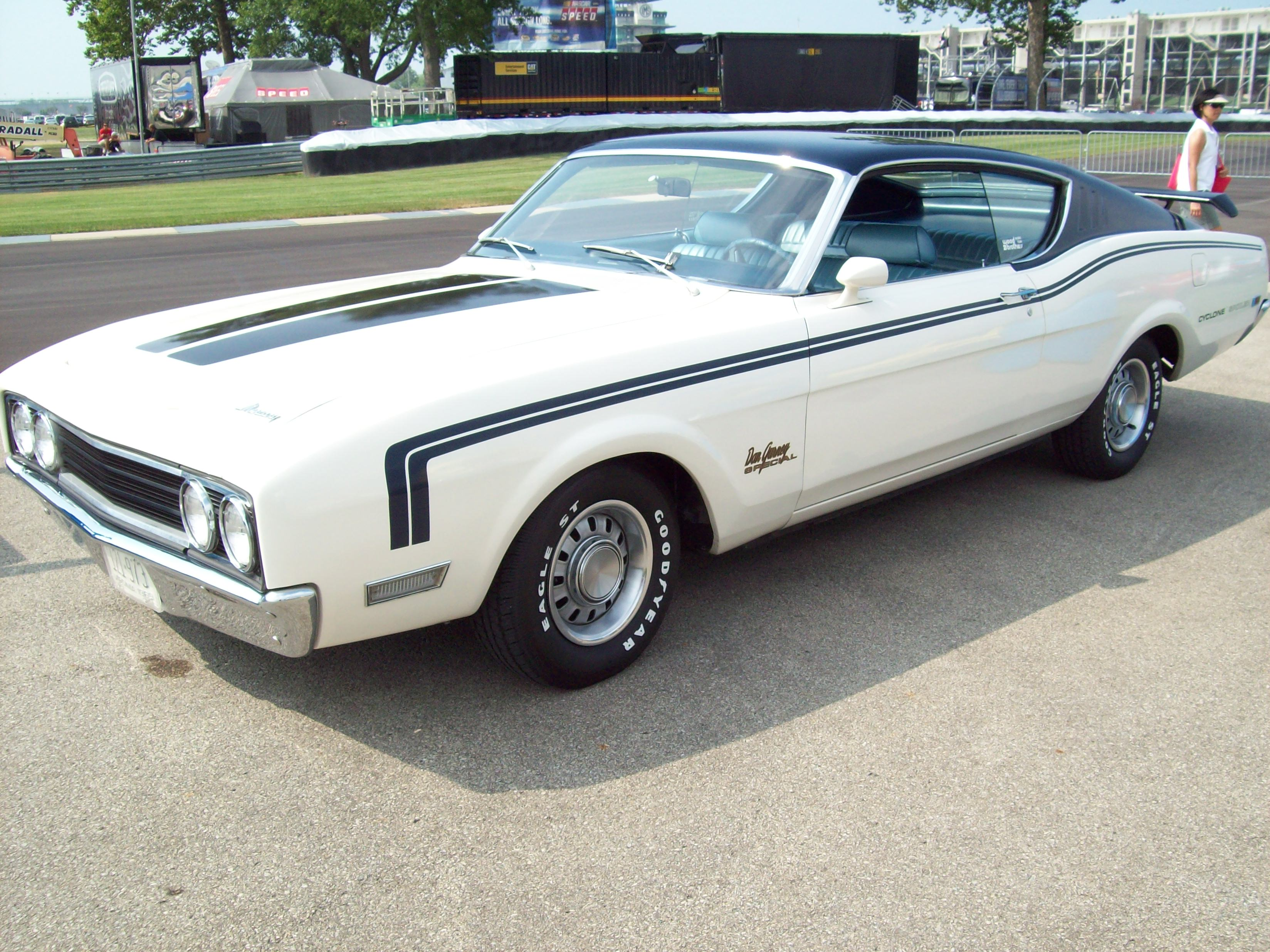
1969 Mercury Cyclone Spoiler II

Mercury produced a version of the Cyclone for NASCAR called the Cyclone Spoiler II. The model was available in two flavors. The street version featured a 351 cu in (5,752 cc) Windsor block, and was used to enter into the NASCAR business. The racing version featured a 429 cu in (7,030 cc) Boss block, which was the same engine as the one in the 1969 Boss Mustang.

==== Cobra Jet ====
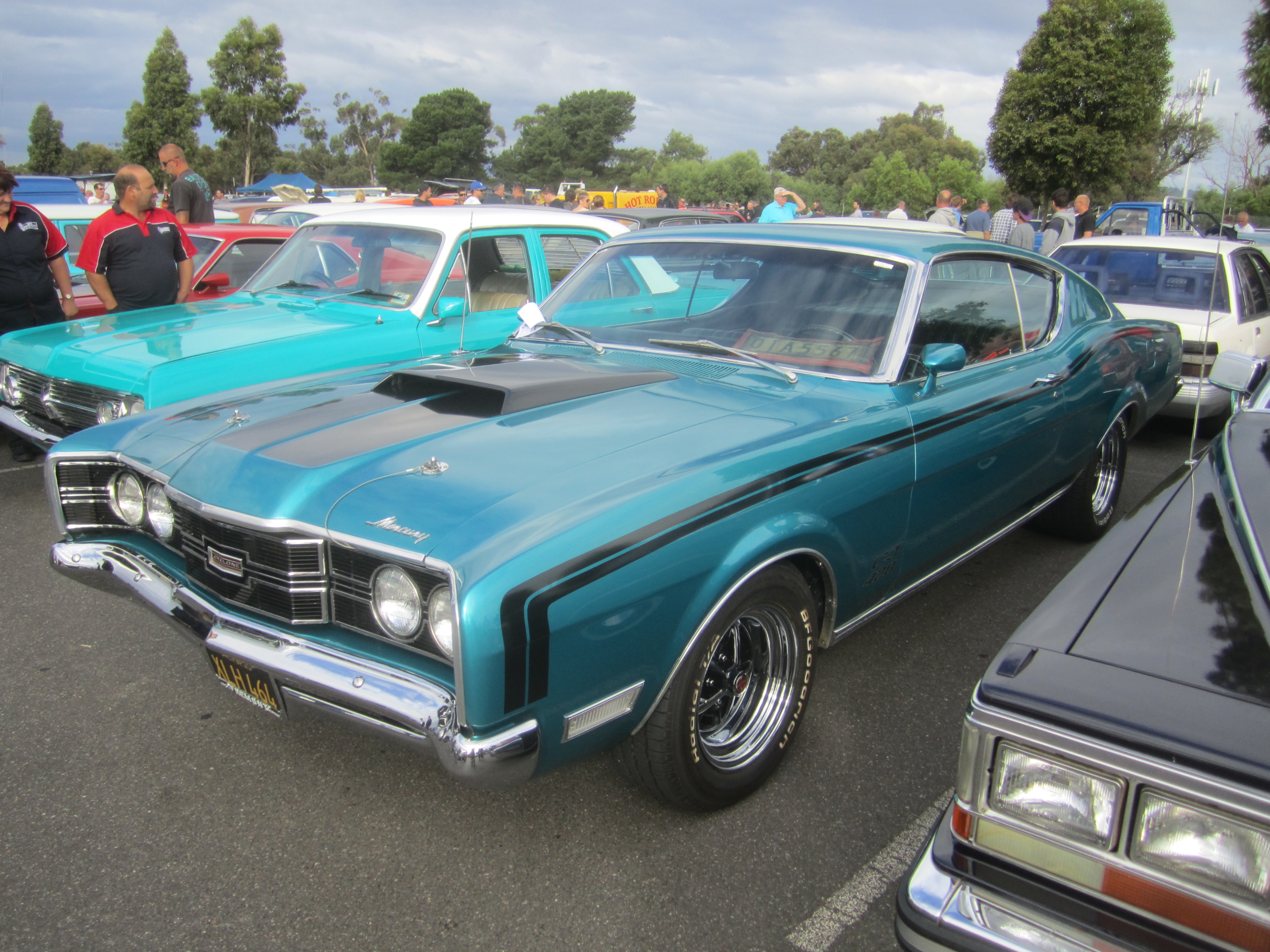
1969 Mercury Cyclone Cobra Jet

Mercury also added a new model to the Cyclone line: the Cobra Jet (CJ). The Cobra Jet's engine was a 428 cu in (7,014 cc) which generated 335 hp (250 kW). The engine had a Ram Air option, a 735 CFM Holley four-barrel carburetor although the option showed no quoted difference in horsepower rating.

The Mercury Cyclone CJ had the following enhancements over the Cyclone and Cyclone GT: it had a blacked-out grille; dual exhausts; 3:50:1 axle ratio; engine dress-up kit (chromed parts); hood (bonnet) stripes; and a competition handling package.

== Fourth generation (1970–1971) ==
=== 1970 ===
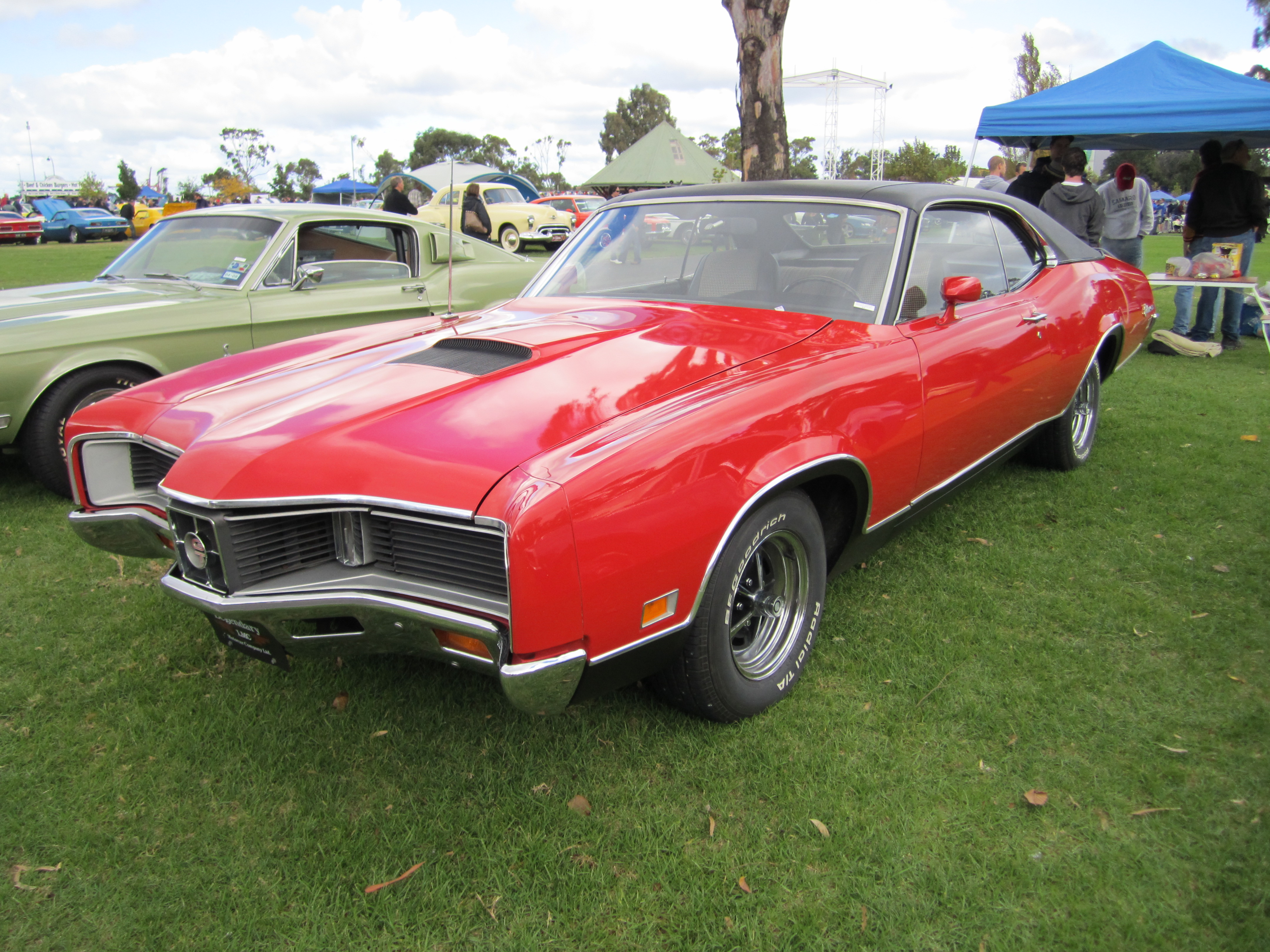
A 1970 Cyclone GT (429 Cobra Jet)

The CJ model was dropped from the Cyclone lineup, and applied to some of the engine names in the series. Mercury thus featured the Cyclone, Cyclone Spoiler and Cyclone GT. The Cyclones consisted of 351 cid V8s and 429 cid V8 engines.

The standard engine for the base Cyclone was the 429 cu in (7,030 cc) four-barrel with dual exhaust that was rated at 360 hp (268 kW) SAE gross (250 hp (186 kW) net). It was the standard engine in the 1970 Mercury Marauder X-100 and was available in other full-size models. It featured a 575 CFM carburetor.

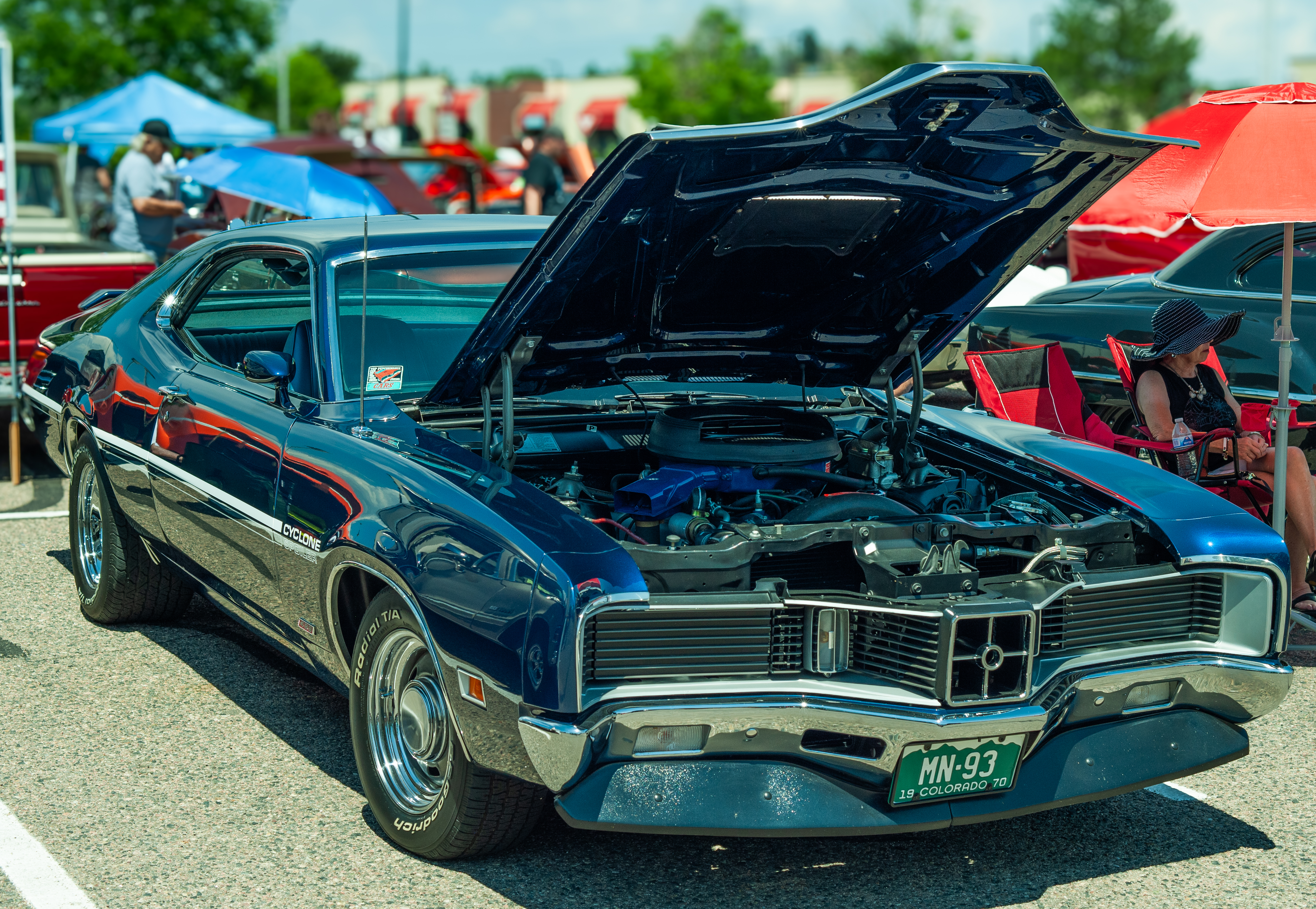
1970 Cyclone Spoiler

Two optional engines were available for the Cyclone. The 429 Cobra Jet was the 429 cu in (7,030 cc) four-barrel with dual exhaust but without the Ram Air induction. It was rated at 370 hp (276 kW) SAE gross (305 hp (227 kW) net) and had a 720 CFM Rochester Quadrajet 4 BBL carburetor. The 429 Super Cobra Jet, which was part of a Drag Pack option, was a 429 cu in (7,030 cc) four-barrel with dual exhaust and Ram Air induction, but it was rated at 375 hp (280 kW) SAE gross (335 hp (250 kW) net), and had a 780 CFM Holley 4 BBL carburetor.

==== 1970 Cyclone Spoiler ====
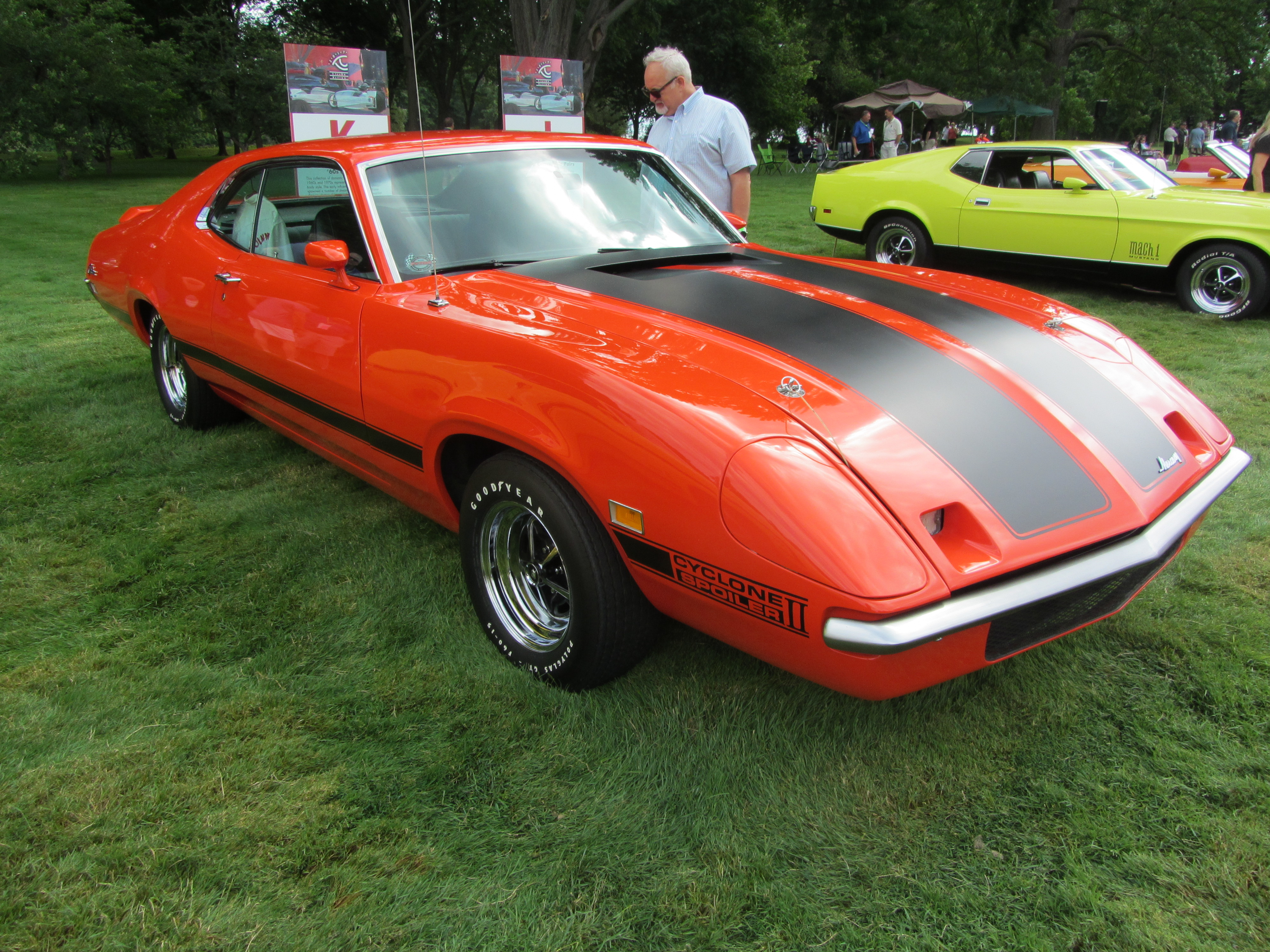
1970 Mercury Cyclone Spoiler II (1 built)

The Cyclone Spoiler was for the performance-minded with front and rear spoilers, black or white racing stripes that went from front to the rear of the car, an integrated functional hood scoop for ram air induction, 140 mph speedometer with a four-gauge suite including an 8,000 rpm tachometer with adjustable red line, vinyl bucket seats, dual racing mirrors and a competition suspension package. The 429 Cobra Jet with Ram Air was the standard engine for the Cyclone Spoiler, with the 429 Super Cobra Jet with Drag Pak and Super Drag Pak optional. The Super Cobra Jet upgraded the block to four main bolts and provided a mechanical flat-tappet camshaft, and the carburetor was changed from a 720 cfm Rochester QuadraJet to a 780 cfm Holley. Standard with the SCJ was the Drag Pack, this package added a front-mounted engine oil cooler and a 3.91 ratio gear, while the Super Drag Pack offered a 4.30 ratio gear and a Detroit "no spin" locker differential. Colors for the Spoiler were limited to Competition Yellow, Competition Blue, pastel blue, Competition Gold, Competition Green and Competition Orange but for a premium Ford included the 'color of your dreams' program, and 31 buyers took advantage.

Ford had intended to continue the Spoiler II option for 1970 with an even more aggressive nose profile. One prototype was built.

==== 1970 Cyclone GT ====
For the sporting gentleman that placed more emphasis in style than speed, there was the Cyclone GT. The basic package offered comfort weave bucket seats, full-length console, twin racing mirrors, integrated hood scoop that could be made functional for optional ram air induction, hide-away headlights, three pod tail lights and unique lower-body line trim. The cost of all of this style was the having a small block 351 Cleveland with 2-barrel carburetor and a three-speed manual transmission as standard fare. However, there were options, and they were good ones. The 4-barrel version of the Cleveland small block followed by a set of 429 CID big blocks up to the Super Cobra Jet and the Drag Pak plus a four-speed transmission and a selection of automatics. Although early sales literature shows the BOSS 429 as an option, none were actually built. An oddity with the GT was the Action Special Equipment Package, for which 953 buyers pulled the trigger. The package included deluxe wheel covers, white sidewall tires, a vinyl roof, and most notably a bench seat replacing the standard bucket seats, all for about a $15.60 credit.

=== 1971 ===
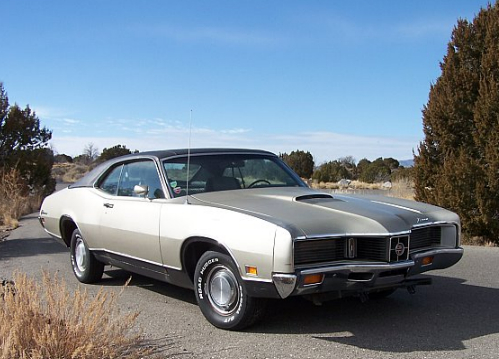
1971 Mercury Montego Cyclone GT

For 1971 the Cyclone was marketed as the Mercury Montego Cyclone. It had some minor styling updates; most noticeable was center section of the grille received a larger ring in the gun sight with the GT receiving a unique badge. The Spoiler received a revised stripe package, and the rear spoiler was painted flat black, and the Base Cyclone now had the integrated hood scoop like the GT and Spoiler. Under the hood things were different as well. Gone was the Super Cobra Jet and Drag Pak options, and the base engine for the Base and Spoiler became the M code 351 Cleveland with 4-barrel carburetor. For the Spoiler, Ram Air also became option as opposed to part of the package for 1970. Beyond minor changes in the color palette and available options, the 1971 Cyclone line was a carry over from 1970. The Cyclone competed for buyers at Lincoln-Mercury dealerships in the performance coupe segment when it was decided to offer the De Tomaso Pantera exotic sports car beginning in 1971.

== Fifth generation (1972) ==
=== 1972 ===
For 1972, the Mercury Montego was fully redesigned with body-on-frame construction, front and rear coil spring suspension, and a new shorter 114-inch wheelbase for two-door models. The Cyclone was reverted to a performance option package available on Mercury Montego, Mercury Montego MX two-door, and the Mercury Montego GT. The package included one of two engines, the 351 cu in (5,752 cc) Q-code 4-barrel Cleveland Cobra Jet small block engine rated at 248 hp (185 kW) SAE net or the 429 cu in (7,030 cc) N-code 4-barrel rated at 205 hp (153 kW) SAE net. The Cyclone option group included a functional Ram Air induction through twin integrated hood scoops, Traction-Lok (limited slip) differential, F70-14 for 351 cu in (5,752 cc) cars, and G70-14 tires for 429 cu in (7,030 cc) powered cars, hub caps and trim rings, body striping and identification, three-spoke steering wheel and dual racing mirrors. The 351 cu in (5,752 cc) was available with either a 4-speed manual transmission or 3-speed automatic, while the 429 cu in (7,030 cc) was only sold with an automatic transmission.

Early Mercury factory literature showed this option available, while later editions did not have any information on the Cyclone package. Only 30 1972 Cyclone package cars were produced, 29 Montego GT's and one Montego MX. Twenty of these Cyclones were equipped with the 429 cu in (7,030 cc) engine.

== Use in motorsport ==
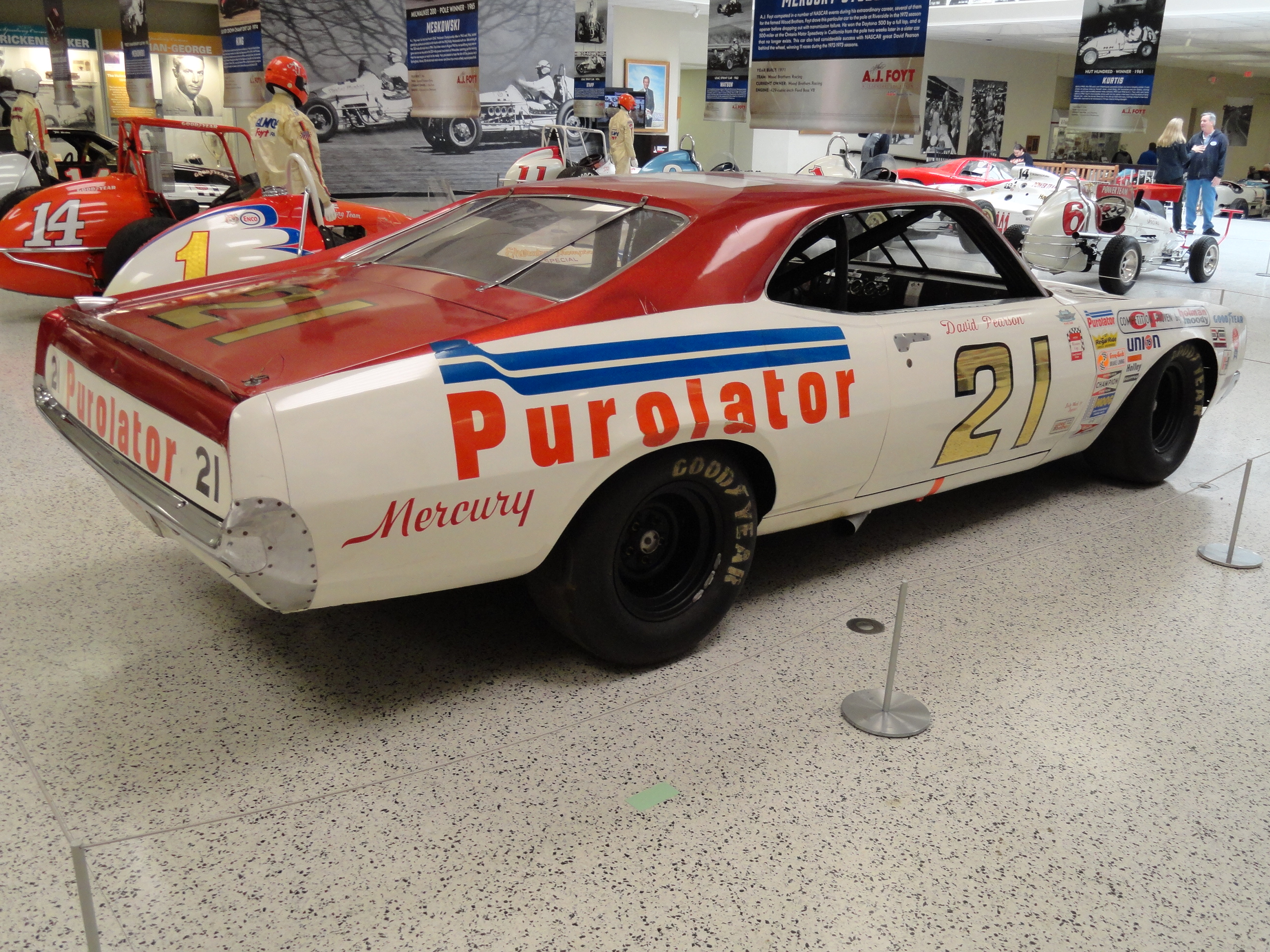
1971 Cyclone driven by A. J. Foyt and David Pearson

During its production, the Mercury (Comet) Cyclone represented the brand in motorsport. Initially gaining use in drag racing, the Cyclone was raced in NASCAR alongside the Fairlane and its Torino successor, with the fourth-generation Cyclone becoming one of the most dominant body styles ever used in Winston Cup racing. In the 1968 Daytona 500, the Cyclone took both first and second place. The Wood Brothers Racing #21 1971 Cyclone still holds a NASCAR record, for 18 wins out of 32 races. For the 1972 Daytona 500, 12 of the 40 cars in the race were Cyclones.

The dominance of the Cyclone would lead to the development of the "Aero Warriors", body styles of production muscle cars aerodynamically optimized for Winston Cup racing (following their homologation). Alongside the Ford Torino Talladega, the Cyclone Spoiler II was introduced to compete with Dodge Charger Daytona and Plymouth Superbird. Although a redesigned Spoiler II was developed in 1970, only a single prototype was produced (alongside three Torino King Cobra counterparts).

For 1971, NASCAR changed its rules to end the production of aerodynamically-optimized cars, increasing their homologation requirements and restricting their engine displacement.

Following the shift of the Cougar from the Mustang to the Montego chassis, Mercury-body NASCAR teams phased out the Cyclone in favor of the Cougar XR7, introduced in 1974.

== Production ==
Mercury (Comet) Cyclone production (1964-1972)
Model year	Production (all versions)	Notes
1964	7,454	
1965	12,347	
1966	8,194	
1967	6,910	809 convertibles
1968	13,628	6,439 Spoilers
1969	9,143	5,882 Cyclones + 3,261 Cyclone CJs
1970		1,695 Cyclones, 10,170 GTs, 1,631 Spoilers
1971		444 Cyclones, 2,287 GTs, 353 Spoilers
1972		30 Cyclones
