= Ford Torino Talladega =

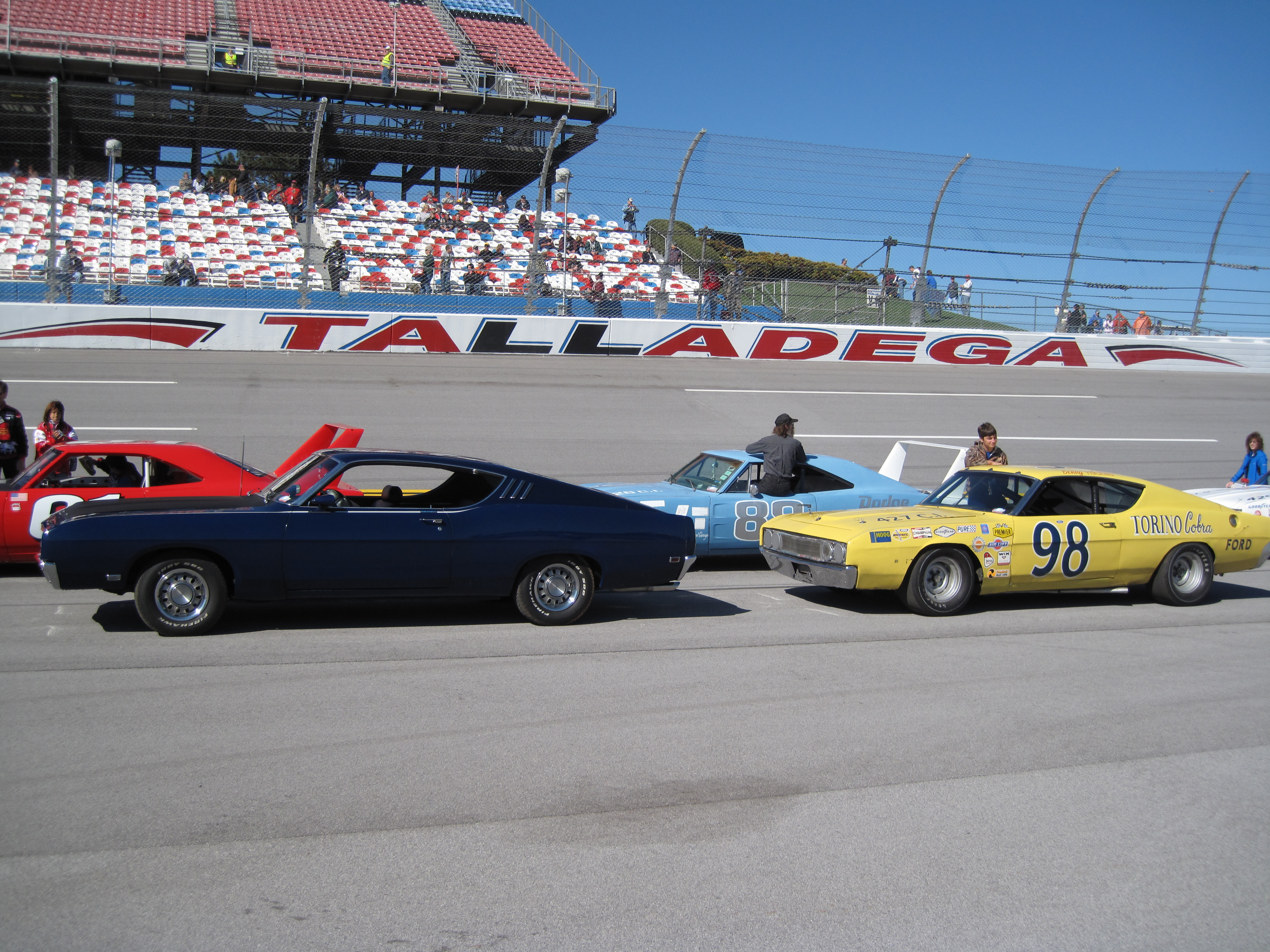

Overview
- Manufacturer: Ford
- Production: 1969
- Model years: 1969
- Designer: Ralph Moody

Body and chassis
- Class: Race car/Muscle Car
- Body style: 2-door hardtop fastback
- Related: Mercury Cyclone Spoiler II; Ford Torino

The Ford Torino Talladega is a muscle car that was produced by Ford only during the first few weeks of 1969. It was named for the Talladega Superspeedway, which opened the same year. The Talladega was a special, more aerodynamic version of the Torino / Fairlane produced specifically to make Ford even more competitive in NASCAR racing, and it was sold to the public only because homologation rules required a certain minimum number of cars (500 in 1969) be produced and made available.

All production Talladegas were equipped with the new 428 Cobra Jet, which, while very powerful and reliable, was intended as a street engine for Ford's muscle cars, as it developed high torque at low RPMs, rather than being a high-revving race engine. Early racing builds were powered by the FE 427 side oiler that had been Ford's main racing engine since 1963; later versions received the Boss 429 engine after it had been homologated in the 1969 Ford Mustang Boss 429.

A largely equivalent vehicle was also sold under the Mercury marque as the Cyclone Spoiler II.

== Design ==
The 1969 Torino Talladega was based on the Fairlane "Sportsroof" (Ford's trade name for a fastback) 2-door hardtop. To make the car more aerodynamic at high speeds, a sleeker front section (whose design and construction is often attributed to the Holman-Moody race team's shop) was added. Regular production Fairlanes and Torinos had a then-fashionable inset grille and headlights, which fared poorly in the wind tunnel. The Torino Talladega replaced this nose with one that extended the car's length by about six inches, with a flush-mounted grille on a more aerodynamic front end. The close-fitting bumper was actually a rear bumper that had been cut, narrowed, V'ed in the center, and filled on the ends to create a crude air dam, further improving the aerodynamics of the car at high speeds.

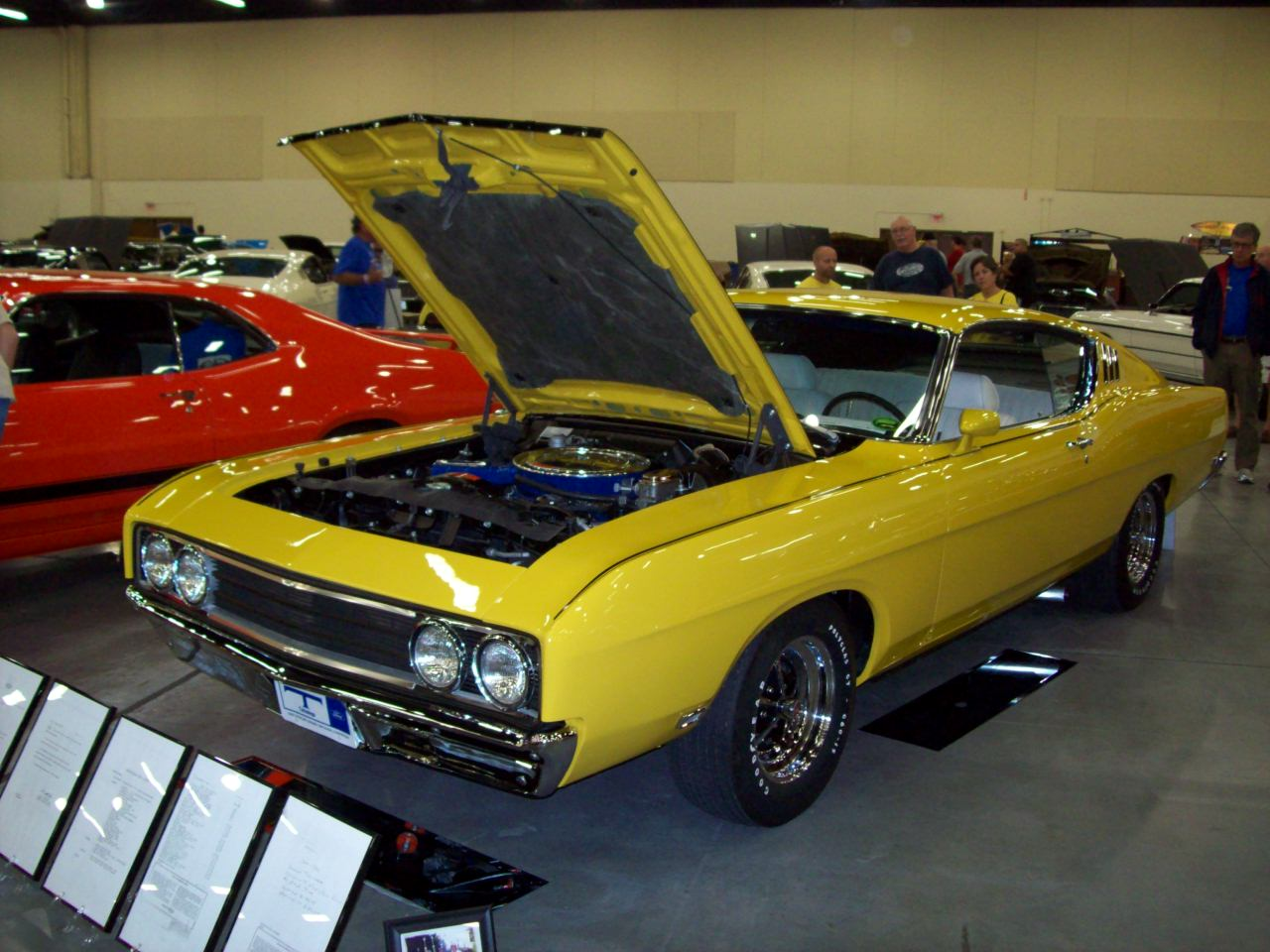
Semon E "Bunkie" Knudsen's custom built Talladega

In another well kept secret design move, the rocker panels of the Talladega were reshaped and rolled to allow Ford teams to run their racing cars about an inch closer to the ground while staying within NASCAR rules; this also greatly enhanced the top speed of the car by lowering its center of gravity, and further reducing its wind resistance. The cars were also equipped with an engine oil cooler, a power steering oil cooler, staggered shocks, a 3.25:1 Ford 9 inch 31 spline nodular open rear end, and most surprisingly: a heavy duty C-6 (cast iron tailshaft) automatic transmission that was column shifted. These other special performance parts were normally only available when ordering a "drag pack car" which would have been equipped with a 4-speed and a limited-slip rear end.

Also unique to the Talladega was the presence of competition black hoods and rear tail panels on all production cars, as well as the only interior offered: black vinyl and cloth with a front bench seat.

== In racing ==
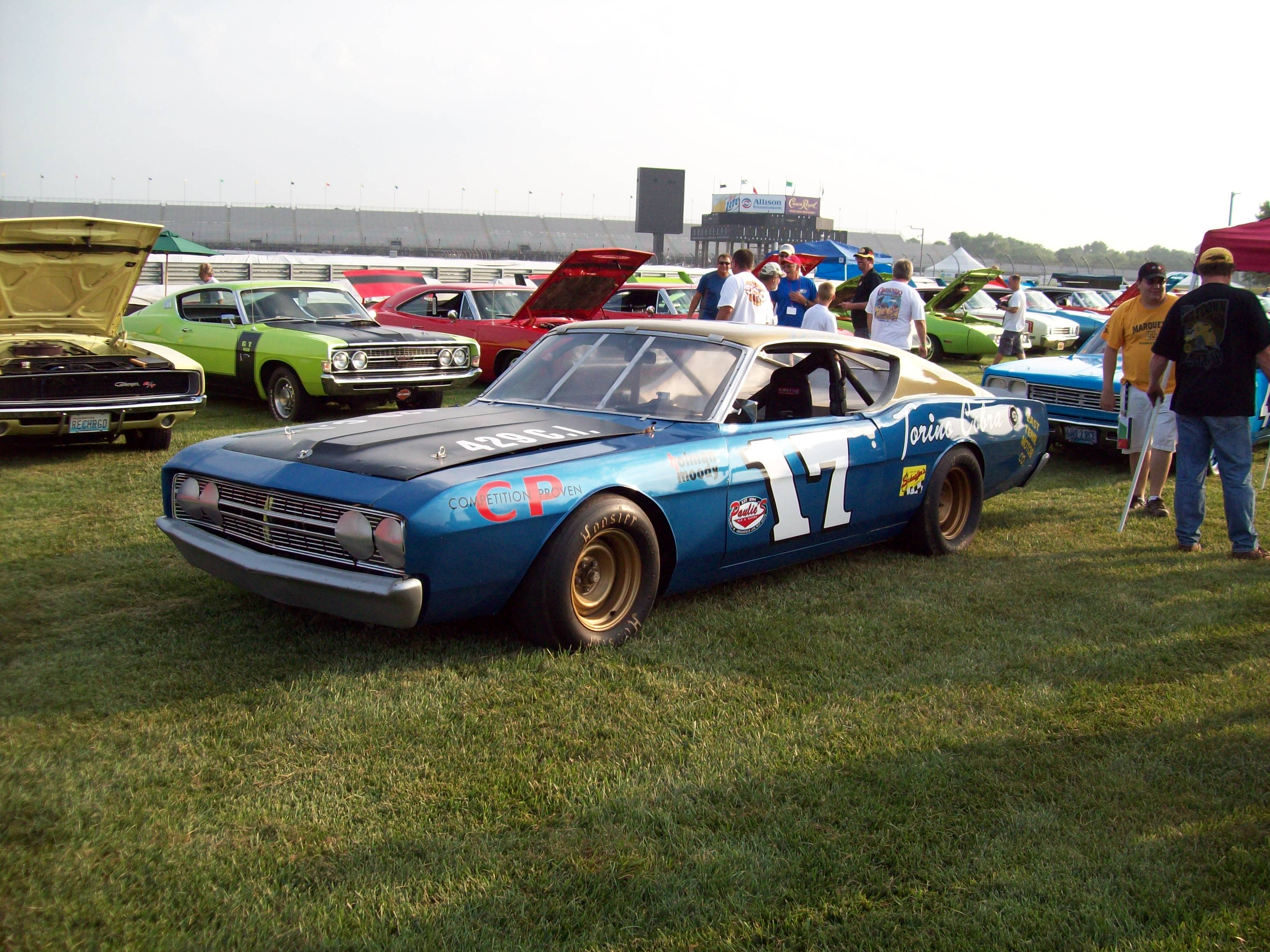
Reproduction of David Pearson's 1969 NASCAR Championship Talladega

Racing versions of the car were initially fitted with the FE 427 side oiler engine that had been Ford's main racing engine since 1963. Later in the season, the Boss 429 engine was used by many of the teams, after it had finally been declared "officially homologated" by NASCAR president Bill France Sr.. The Boss 429 engine was homologated in the 1969 Ford Mustang Boss 429. In a very unusual move, Ford homologated the engine separately from the car in which it was to race. Many experts think this may have been done in order to get the bodywork of the Talladega officially homologated at the beginning of the 1969 race season, as the Boss 429 was not yet in production in sufficient numbers to homologate it. All production Talladegas were actually equipped with the new 428 Cobra Jet, which, while very powerful and reliable, was intended as a street engine for Ford's muscle cars, as it developed high torque at low RPMs, rather than being a high-revving race engine.

=== Accolades ===
The Torino Talladega did exactly what Ford hoped it would do on the racing circuit: it won 29 Grand National races during the 1969 and 1970 NASCAR seasons - far more than any other model. Further, it won the 1969 NASCAR Manufacturer's Championship with David Pearson winning the Driver's Championship, and it won the 1969 ARCA Manufacturer's Championship with Benny Parsons winning that Driver's Championship. Chrysler's initial competitor was the Dodge Charger 500, which proved to be aerodynamically inferior to the Talladega, especially on NASCAR's super speedways (tracks of a mile or more in length).

After realizing that Ford's Talladega (and its sister ship, the Mercury Spoiler II) were much more effective as race cars, Dodge went back to the drawing board to create the Dodge Charger Daytona, which managed to win a total of 6 races during the 1969 and 1970 NASCAR seasons. Richard Petty finished second in NASCAR's Grand National points race in 1969, driving a Talladega.

=== Abandonment ===
1969 was Ford's last year of factory involvement in racing of any kind for several years. Following Congressional hearings in which they were questioned about the R&D costs of racing vs. improving fuel economy and safety, Ford completely abandoned all of their racing programs, starting with the 1970 season. Subsequently, most of the NASCAR and ARCA race teams that were running Fords continued to run their 1969 Talladegas in 1970 without any factory support, when it became apparent that their Talladegas were aerodynamically superior to the 1970 Torinos Ford had intended to be the Talladega's replacement. After the 1970 season, NASCAR effectively banned the "aero cars" by restricting all of these "production" cars to having to compete with engines no larger than 305 cubic inches of displacement (vs. the 426, 427, & 429 cubic inches other cars could use), and the competitive history of the Talladega (and its aerodynamically developed rivals) was essentially over.

== Production numbers ==
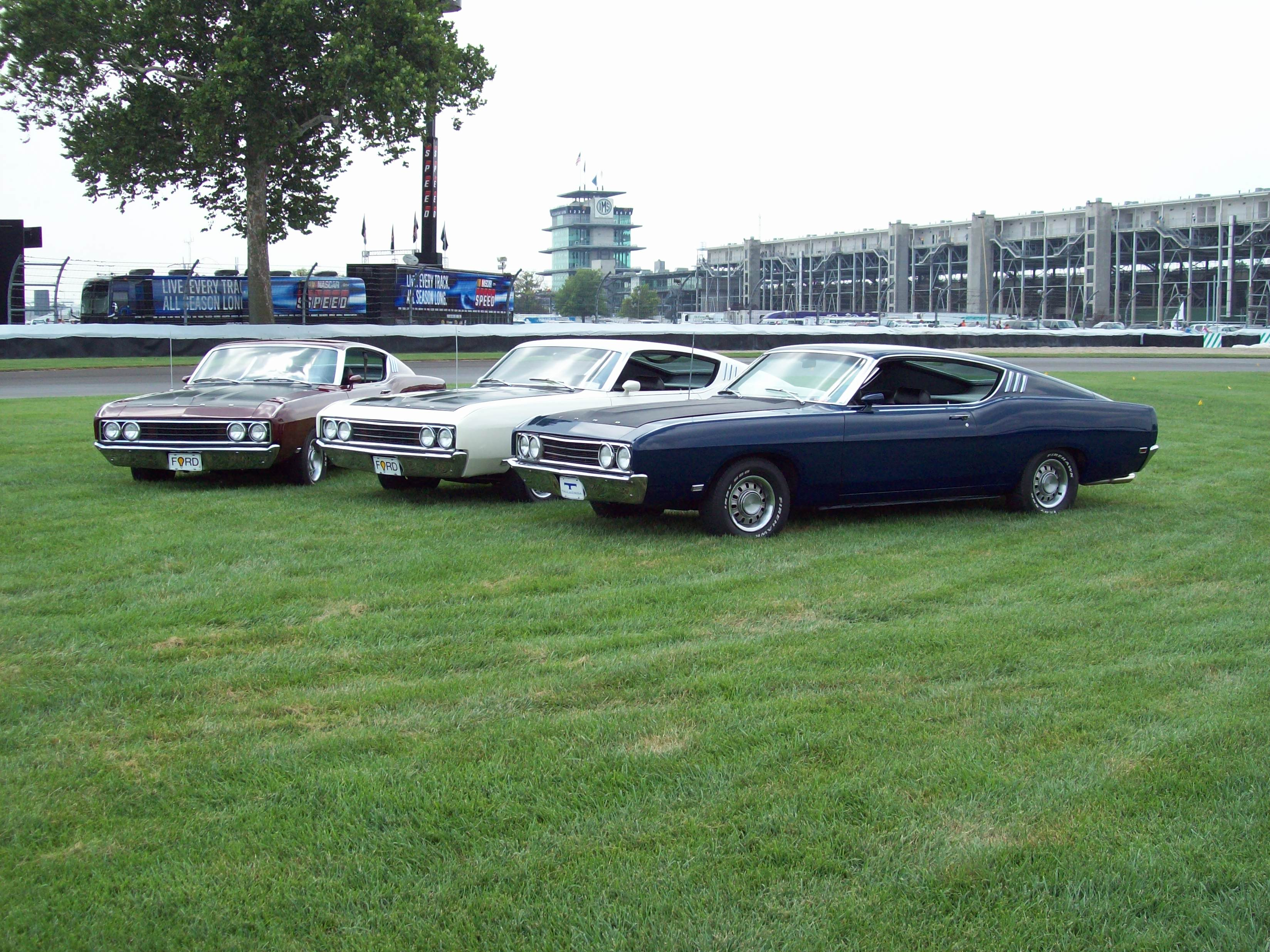
Examples of three production colors: Royal Maroon, Wimbledon White & Presidential Blue

It is believed a total of 754 Talladegas may have been built, although the Talladega/Spoiler Registry can only account for 750. This number includes all prototypes, pilot cars, and production cars built, plus a special post-production car for the president of Ford Motor Company, Semon "Bunkie" Knudsen, in March 1969. The Knudsen car was significantly different from all of the homologation cars with regard to options and color, and was even built at a different plant: Ford's Lorain, Ohio plant on March 20, 1969.

All production examples were constructed during January and February 1969 at Ford's Atlanta Assembly plant in Atlanta, Georgia, and all homologation cars between January 21 and February 28. (According to the Talladega/Spoiler Registry's records, Talladega number 502 was actually completed on January 31, and then the last 247 homologation cars were built between February 14 and February 28, following a 2-week break in production.) It is unknown as to why Ford built an "extra" 247 homologation cars, once the homologation requirements had been met during the initial run, as it is thought that Ford lost several thousand dollars on every Talladega that was built.

The only options offered on the production vehicles (besides the three color choices, including Wimbledon White (286 built), Royal Maroon (258 built) or Presidential Blue (199 built)) were power steering, power brakes, color keyed racing mirrors, AM radio and argent styled steel wheels with F70 X 14 wide oval tires. All production Talladegas received the same options with no substitutions including the C6 automatic transmission and Code 9 3.25 ratio conventional rear axle.

== Collectability ==
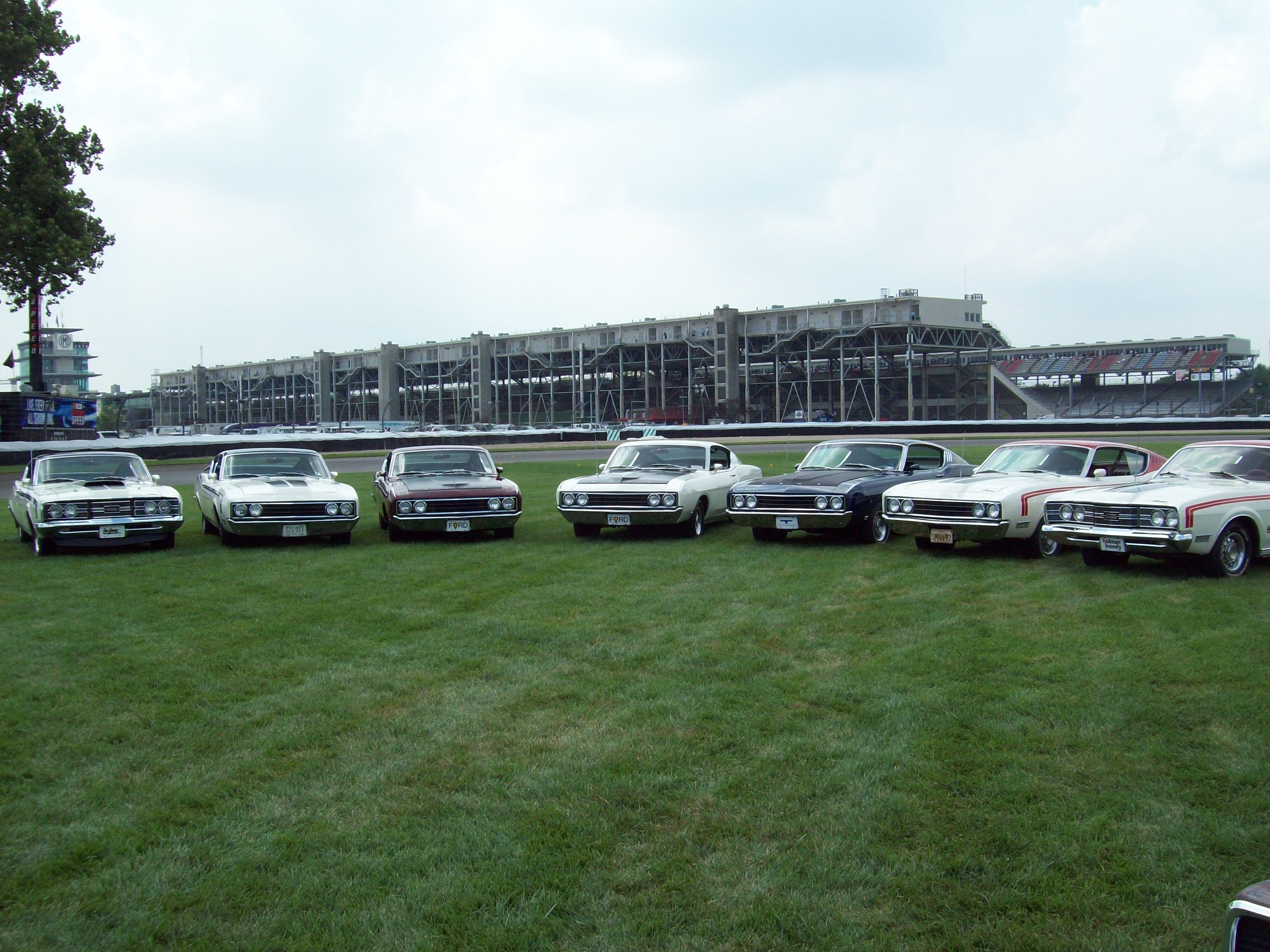
The seven colors and body styles of Talladega, Spoiler, and Spoiler II cars offered in 1969

Today, the Torino Talladega is considered a collectible car. It was a special purpose built vehicle (some have even called it a "showroom race car") with a strong racing history, and major links to the NASCAR teams of 1969, that achieved great success during the Aero Wars. The few examples that still exist today, do so in very limited numbers. Until recently, their values had not risen nearly as high as the Mopar "aero cars" in spite of their rarity and their track successes during the Aero Wars years. Some experts have assumed that this was due to the sheer outrageousness of the Dodge Charger Daytona and the Plymouth Superbird, with their bolted on huge rear wings and nose cones; as the MOPAR winged cars' prices had eclipsed the far more subtle, and aerodynamically integrated, bodywork of the Ford Torino Talladega and its sibling, the Mercury Cyclone Spoiler II.

== See also ==
- List of Ford vehicles
