= Hudson Wasp =

Full-sized automobile produced by Hudson and American Motors

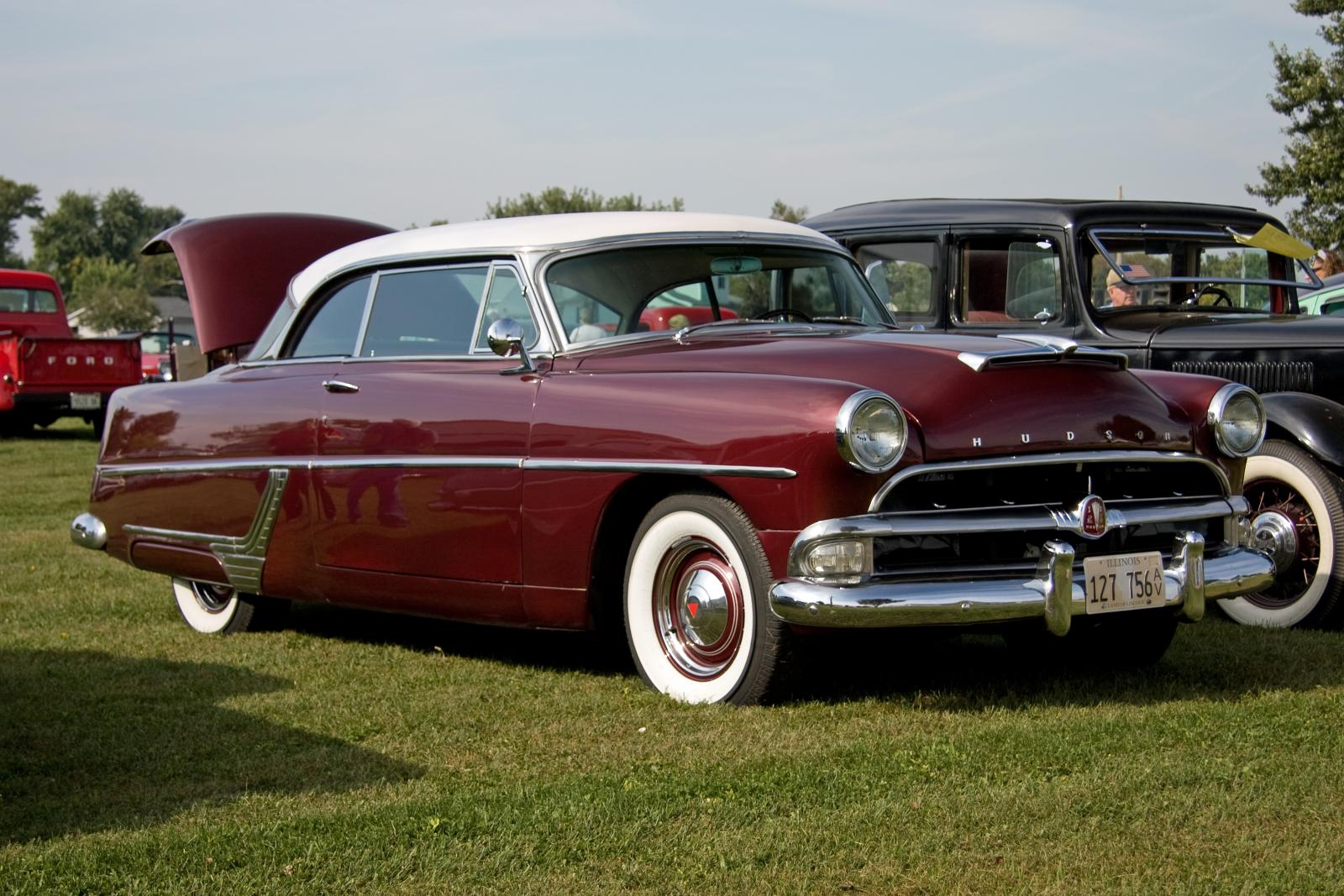
- 1954 Hudson Super Wasp Hollywood Hardtop

Overview
- Manufacturer: Hudson Motor Car Company; American Motors Corporation
- Production: 1951–1956
- Model years: 1952–1956
- Assembly: United States; Australia

Body and chassis
- Class: Full-size car
- Layout: FR layout

Chronology
- Predecessor: Hudson Super Custom Six

The Hudson Wasp is an automobile built and marketed by the Hudson Motor Car Company of Detroit, Michigan, from 1952 through the 1956 model years. After Hudson merged with Nash Motors, the Wasp was then built by American Motors Corporation (AMC) in Kenosha, Wisconsin, and marketed under its Hudson marque for model years 1955 and 1956.

Two distinct generations of the Hudson Wasp can be identified: from 1952 to 1954, when it used Hudson's existing short-wheelbase platform, and in 1955 and 1956, when it was built on the full-sized Nash platform. The two generations differed in their platform designs, engine options, and body styles. The second generation also received unique styling for each of its two model years.

== First generation ==
First generation
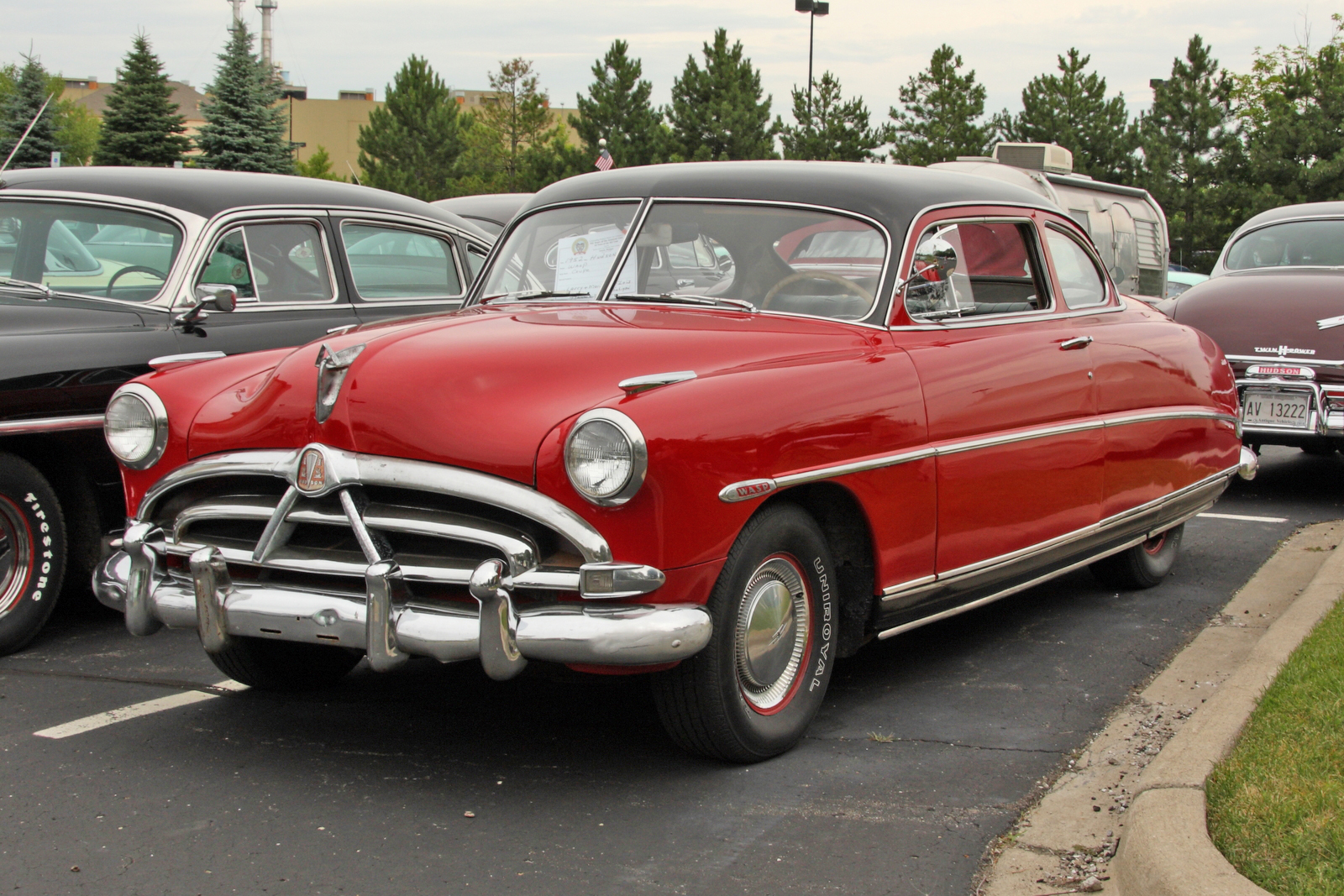
- 1952 Hudson Wasp Club Coupe

Overview
- Production: 1952–1954

Body and chassis
- Body style: 2-door coupe; 2-door sedan; 4-door sedan; 2-door hardtop; 2-door convertible
- Platform: short-wheelbase Hudson

Powertrain
- Engine: 232 cu in (3.8 L) I6; 262 cu in (4.3 L) I6
- Transmission: 3-speed manual; 3-speed manual with overdrive; Hydramatic automatic (General Motors)

Dimensions
- Wheelbase: 119 in (3,023 mm)
- Length: 202.5 in (5,144 mm)
- Width: 77 in (1,956 mm)
- Height: 60 in (1,524 mm)

=== 1952 ===
The Wasp (Series 58) was introduced by Hudson for the 1952 model year as an upgraded version of the Hudson Pacemaker, replacing the Hudson Super Custom models from 1951. The Wasp was available as a two- and four-door sedan, a convertible, and a two-door hardtop, designated the Hollywood. The new models were shorter than the Hudson Hornet, and positioned as a "lower-priced running mate" to follow the sales success of the 1951 Hornet.

The Wasp featured the unitized, "Monobilt" step-down chassis design with a 119-inch (3,023 mm) wheelbase and overall 202.5 inches (5,144 mm) length. The structure used a perimeter frame, providing a rigid structure, low center of gravity, and side-impact protection for passengers, including a box-section steel girder outside the rear wheels. The Wasp's wheelbase was same as the lower-priced Pacemaker, 5 inches (127 mm) shorter than the Hornet, but the exterior trim and interior appointments like on the top-level Hornet.

Standard features for 1952 included the model name on the front fenders, which began the full-length stainless steel body side molding, illuminated medallion in the front grille, rear bumper guard for the license plate and concealed light, a carpeted trunk with an upright-mounted spare tire, a 30-hour mechanical clock on the dashboard, illuminated ignition switch keyway, and the interior featuring tan cord upholstery with red and brown wide and narrow stripes as well as hand grips, ash tray, robe cord, and a large magazine pocket for rear seat passengers.

The Wasp's engine was the 262 cu in (4.3 L) L-head I6 rated at 127 hp (95 kW; 129 PS) that was also used in the Hudson Commodore. Manual transmission was standard with overdrive optional, or the Hydramatic transmission from General Motors.

=== 1953 ===
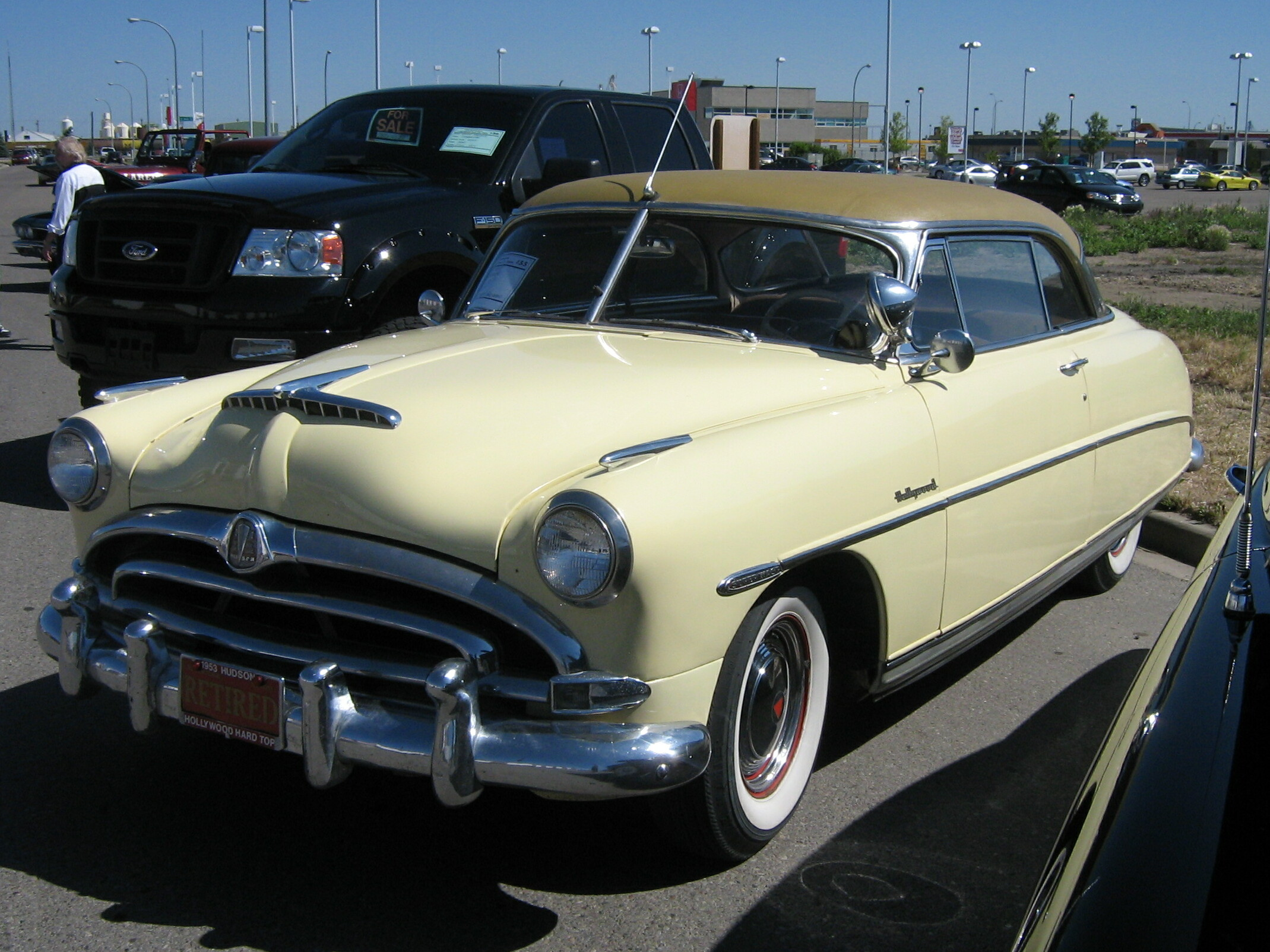
1953 Hudson Super Wasp Hollywood 2-door hardtop

Hudson's large-car line for 1953 was introduced in November 1952. However, the automaker focused on introducing its new compact-sized car, the Jet, which was unveiled in December 1952.

Hudson's large cars were carryovers, but the automaker added an upper-level Super Wasp line that replaced the discontinued "Commodore 6" models. This model continued the improved interior materials and a more powerful Hudson I6 engine. The Super Wasp was offered in additional body styles: as a two-door "Hollywood" (pillar-less) hardtop and a "Brougham" convertible, of which 50 were made. The base Wasp was repositioned and priced lower to replace the discontinued "Pacemaker" models.

The base Hudson Wasp used the 232 cu in (3.8 L) L-Head I6 from the discontinued Pacemaker. The Super Wasp included Hudson's 262 cu in (4.3 L) L-Head I6 with a single two-barrel carburetor. This engine was rated at 127 hp (95 kW; 129 PS) (with a single two-barrel carburetor) while the top-of-the-line Commodore Custom Eight's 254 cu in (4.2 L) I8 was rated at 128 hp (95 kW; 130 PS). The Super Wasp's power was underrated, so it would not surpass the flagship straight-eight engine.

The narrow-block 262 cu in (4.3 L) engine was the basis for the stroked and reinforced Hornet 308 cu in (5.0 L) I6 engine, introduced in 1951, which dominated NASCAR racing from 1952 until 1954. The Super Wasp was also offered with an aluminum "twin H" manifold and twin two-barrel carburetors. Super Wasp performance with the "twin H" induction matched the performance of the big two-barrel 308 cu in (5.0 L) equipped, but heavier, Hudson Hornet.

Wasp model-year production totaled 21,876 units in 1953. Moreover, the decline in Hudson sales was due to the lack of a V8 engine in its full-sized models and to the lack of annual styling enhancements offered by the domestic Big Three automakers (General Motors, Ford, and Chrysler) that attracted buyers. While the new compact-sized Hudson Jet models were well-built and well-equipped, following the successful formula of the Nash Rambler, the costs of development and the styling of the small Hudson irreparably damaged the company.

Moreover, the sales war between Ford and Chevrolet during 1953 negatively impacted the sales and profitability of Hudson as well as the other "independent" automakers. Discussions began to merge Nash and Hudson. The objective was to reduce costs and strengthen the sales organizations to meet the intense competition from domestic Big Three automakers.

=== 1954 ===
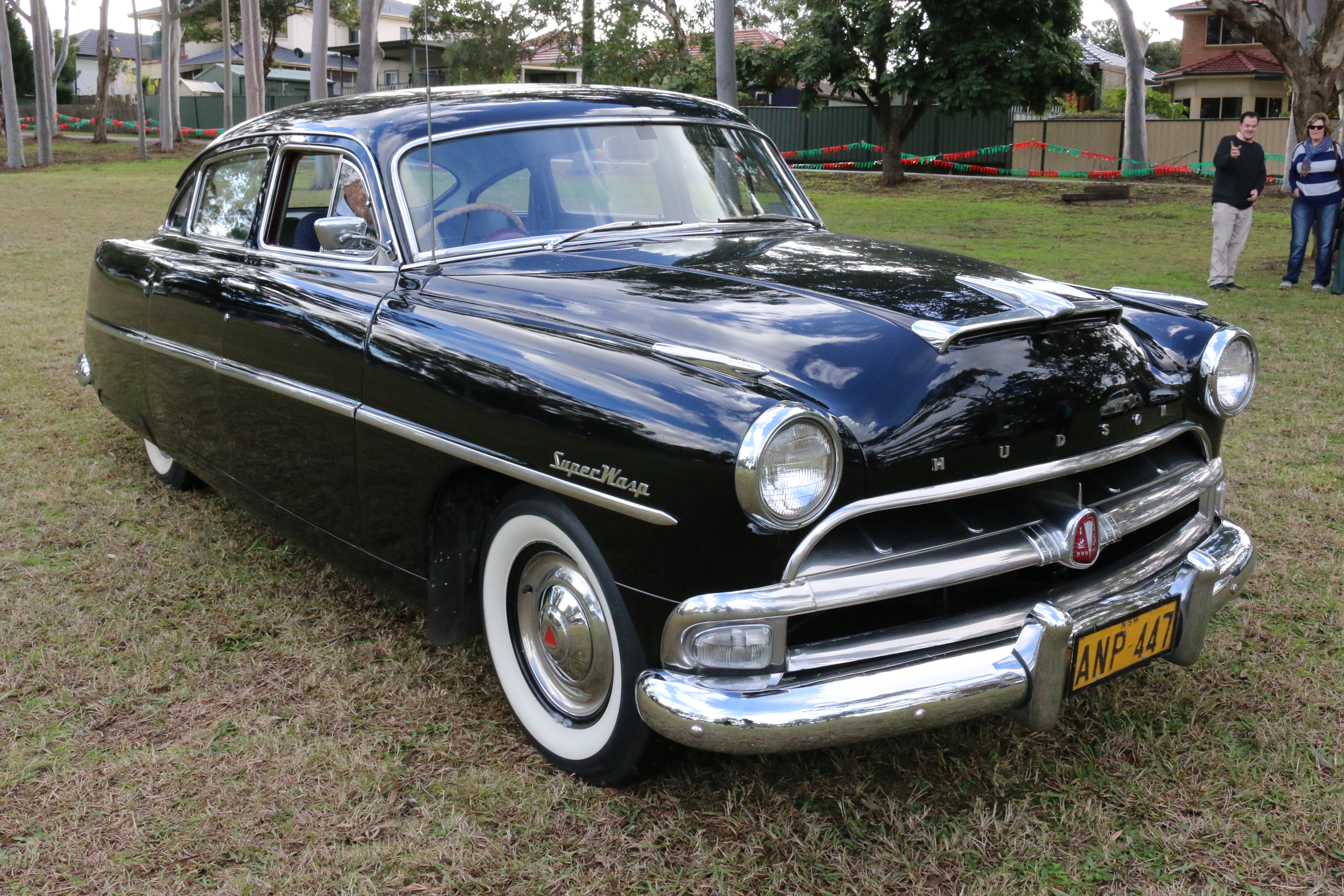
1954 Hudson Super Wasp Four-Door Sedan

For the 1954 model year, Hudson reskinned its senior line of large cars (Hornet, Super Wasp, and Wasp) to give them a more contemporary look. The full-sized Hudson models now had a new linear front-to-rear body design for the 1954 model year. This was an expensive undertaking, given the unibody design of the Hudson vehicles. The basic roofline of the sedans indicated the continuation of the unibody, and the drivetrain was unchanged. The hardtops and coupes featured new rooflines. The front end was restyled with a simpler grille, a functional hood scoop, and a new one-piece curved windshield. The formerly sloped rear end was squared off to the rear fender, which featured new, high-mounted, larger taillamps. The exterior changes made the Hudsons look longer, while the interiors were updated with new dashes and instrument clusters.

The dealer introduction date was on 2 October 1953. The 1954 Wasps were available in a two-door coupe or sedan as well as a four-door sedan, while the Super Wasp also offered a two-door "Hollywood" (pillar-less) hardtop and a "Brougham" convertible. Hudson also simplified the 1954 model year full-size cars, introducing the longer-wheelbase Hornet with a 308 cu in (5.0 L) I6 engine, while the Wasp models continued the 119 in (3,023 mm) wheelbase.

The standard engine on the Super Wasp was the 140 hp (104 kW; 142 PS) 262 cu in (4.3 L) I6 producing 290 lb⋅ft (393 N⋅m) of torque. An optional aluminum cylinder head with a 7.5-to-1 compression ratio rated at 143 hp (107 kW; 145 PS). A Twin H-Power version developing 149 hp (111 kW; 151 PS) was also available.

The 126 hp (94 kW; 128 PS) 232 cu in (3.8 L) I6 engine was standard on the Wasp, with an available 129 hp (96 kW; 131 PS) version featuring an aluminum cylinder head and a 7.5-to-1 compression ratio. All Hudson engines were "Instant Action with Super Induction" to describe the L-head engine upgrades for 1954.

After approval from the boards and shareholders, Hudson officially merged with Nash-Kelvinator Corporation on 1 May 1954. On 2 October 1954, the last "true" Hudson was built in Detroit. A total of 11,603 Wasps Wasps were produced in 1954.

==== Racing ====
A Hudson Wasp competed in the grueling 1954 Carrera Panamericana race held from 19 until 23 November. It was held in eight stages over 1,910 miles (3,074 km). Malcolm C. Eckart and Carroll Hamplemann drove their #219 car for 23 hours and 28 minutes to finish in eleventh place in the stock car class (Tourismo Especial).

Of the 150 cars that started this race, only 85 finished all eight stages, and several drivers died in crashes. The 1954 event was the last road race of its kind, one of the motorsport's most challenging and dangerous.

== Second generation ==
Second generation
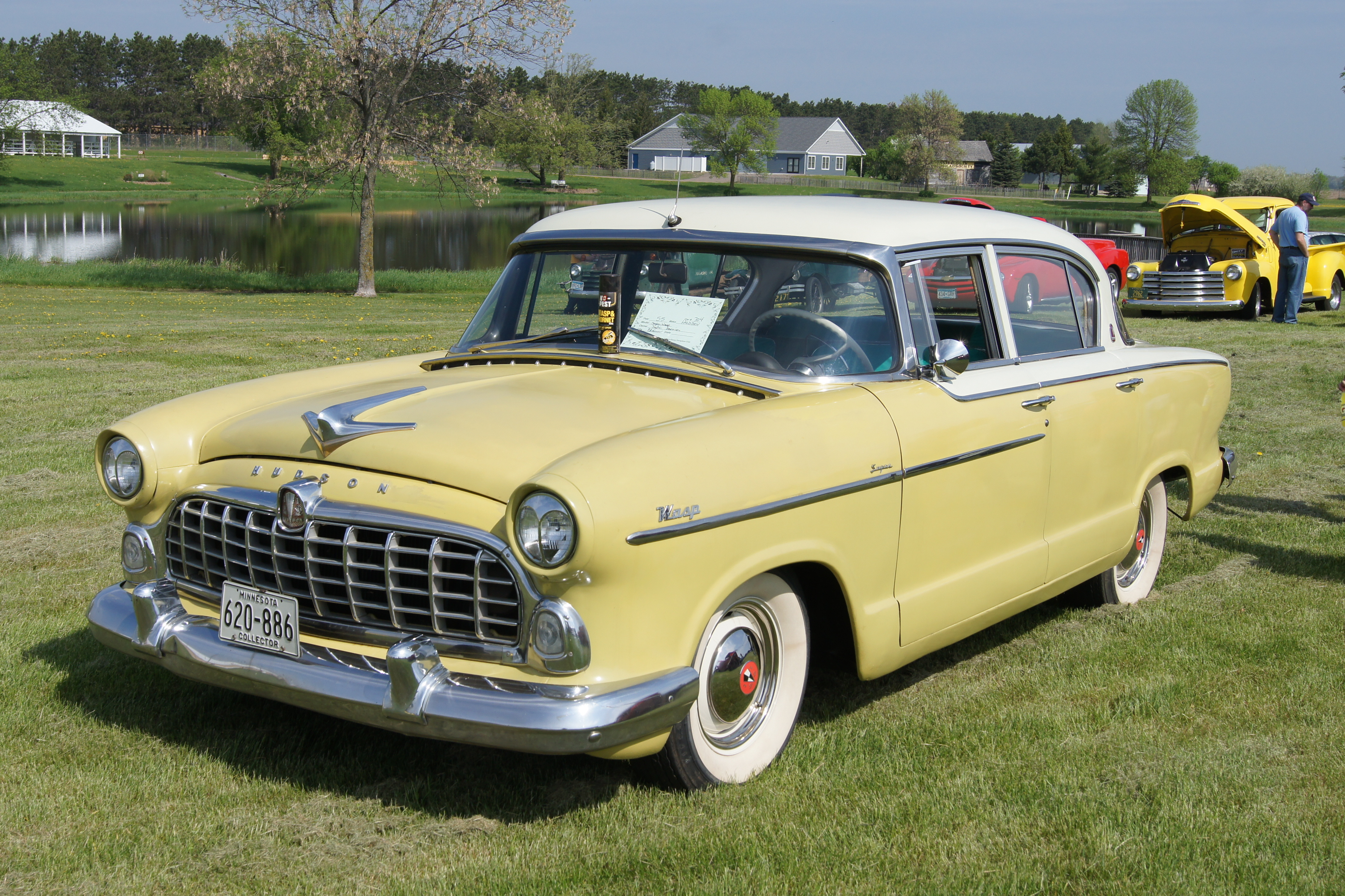
- 1955 Hudson Wasp Super 4-Door Sedan

Overview
- Production: 1955–1956

Body and chassis
- Body style: 2-door sedan; 4-door sedan
- Platform: "senior" Nash

Powertrain
- Engine: 202 cu in (3.3 L); 308 cu in (5.0 L) I6
- Transmission: 3-speed manual; 3-speed manual with overdrive; Hydramatic automatic (General Motors)

Dimensions
- Wheelbase: 114.3 in (2,903 mm)

=== 1955 ===
For 1955, the Wasp became a product of the newly formed American Motors Corporation (AMC). Following the end of 1954 model year production, Hudson's Detroit manufacturing facility was closed, and assembly of Hudson models was shifted to Nash's factory in Kenosha, Wisconsin.

The new Hudsons by AMC were introduced at the Chicago Auto Show in February 1955. The cars were now based on the unitized "senior" Nash platforms, but featured exclusive Hudson styling. However, they no longer had the Hudson's characteristic "step-down" design and wide stance. Two Hudson models were produced for 1955. The larger Hornet, built on the 1955 Nash Ambassador platform, with the Hornet 308 cu in (5.0 L) I6 engine, or an optional smaller-displacement 320 cu in (5.2 L) version of Packard's V8.

The lower-line Wasp model shared the 114.3 in (2,903 mm) wheelbase of the Nash Statesman platform and was available as a four-door sedan or a two-door "Hollywood" hardtop. Included was Hudson's 202 cu in (3.3 L) I6 engine, previously used in the Jet compact sedan, as well as the limited-production Hudson Italia. This engine was available with "H-Power" dual-carburetors producing 120 hp (89 kW; 122 PS). The Wasp was available in standard, Super Wasp, and Custom versions. At mid-year, the Wasp platform was used for the "Hornet Special" model featuring Hornet trim and interiors as well as AMC's new 250 cu in (4.1 L) 190 hp (142 kW; 193 PS) V8 engine.

The 1955 Hudsons used Nash's long-travel coil-spring suspension, an integrated and advanced heating and ventilation system, and were available with optional air conditioning and reclining seats. However, Hudson's dual braking system, which included a mechanical backup in case of a hydraulic failure, was continued.

The Nash-based Hudsons were focused on comfort and were no longer competitive on the race tracks they dominated from 1952 through 1954.

Hudson Wasp sales dropped to 7,191 units for the year. Traditional Hudson buyers left the marque, viewing the cars as inferior to past models.

=== 1956 ===
For the 1956 model year, AMC executives decided to give the Wasp and Hornet more character to boost sales. The vehicle design was given to Richard Arbib.

Arbib provided Hudson with a distinctive look, which he called "V-Line Styling". Taking the traditional Hudson triangle, Arbib applied its "V" form in every conceivable manner across the car's interior and exterior. Arbib's design for the front end combined a tightly woven egg-crate grille bisected by a prominent "V". The body side trim became more complicated and featuring such details as air-scoop fender-top ornaments and wedge-shaped surrounds for the parking lamps. Combined with available tri-tone paint combinations, Hudson's new look was unique.

However, the plan to build a better Hudson identity was unsuccessful, even with the car's flashy design. It did not excite buyers, and production ended after one year.

The Wasp was available only as a four-door sedan in one "Super" trim level. Wasp sales fell to 2,519 units in its final year of production.

== End of production ==
For 1957, AMC discontinued the Wasp with only the Hornet remaining Hudson through the model year.

== Australian assembly ==
The Wasp was assembled in Australia from complete knock down (CKD) kits.
