= Hudson Pacemaker =

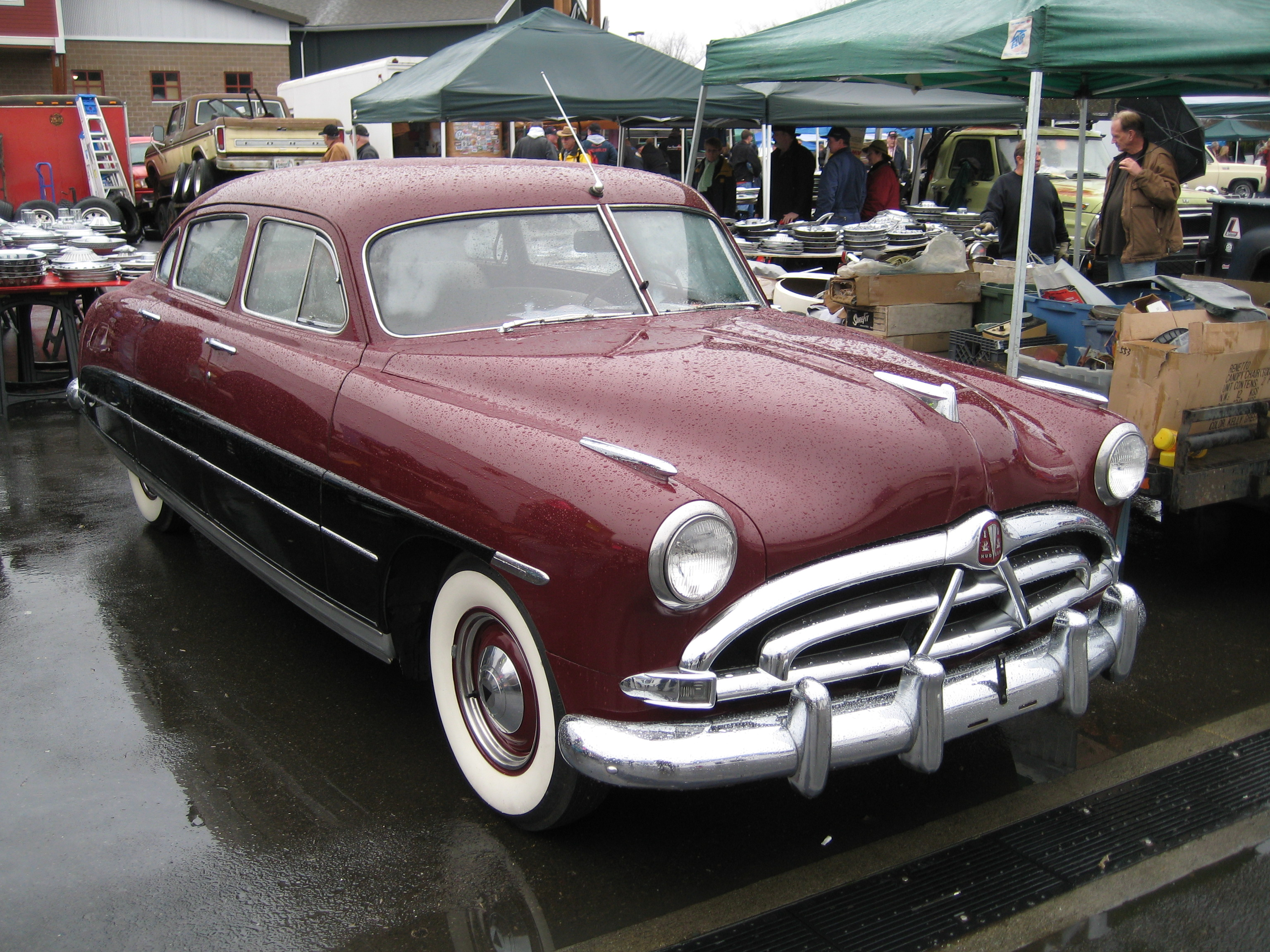
- 1951 Hudson Pacemaker Four-Door Sedan

Overview
- Manufacturer: Hudson Motor Car Company
- Production: 1939; 1949–1952
- Model years: 1939; 1950–1952
- Assembly: United States

Body and chassis
- Class: Full-size car
- Layout: FR layout
- Related: Hudson Hornet

The Hudson Pacemaker is an automobile which was produced by the Hudson Motor Car Company in 1939 and for the 1950 through 1952 model years.

== 1939 ==
The Pacemaker was introduced in March 1939 and is often considered to be the replacement for the Terraplane. It was built on a 118-inch wheelbase and powered by a 212 cubic inch six cylinder engine. The Pacemaker was not carried over into the 1940 Hudson range.

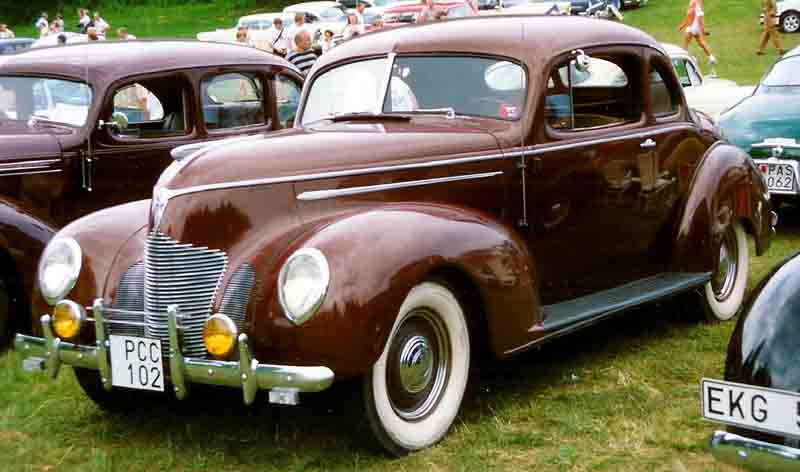
1939 Hudson Pacemaker Coupe

== 1950 to 1952 ==
The Pacemaker was again offered for the 1950 through 1952 model years. It was the cheapest model in the Hudson range in each of the three years. The Pacemaker had a 119-inch wheelbase, five inches shorter than that used for all other contemporary Hudson models. The Pacemaker had the flathead 232 cubic inch 6-cylinder engine. The Wasp debuted in 1952 with the 262 six, but when the Pacemaker was discontinued, the 1953-54 Wasp base engine became the Pacemaker's 232. The 262-equipped Wasp models were designated Super Wasp.

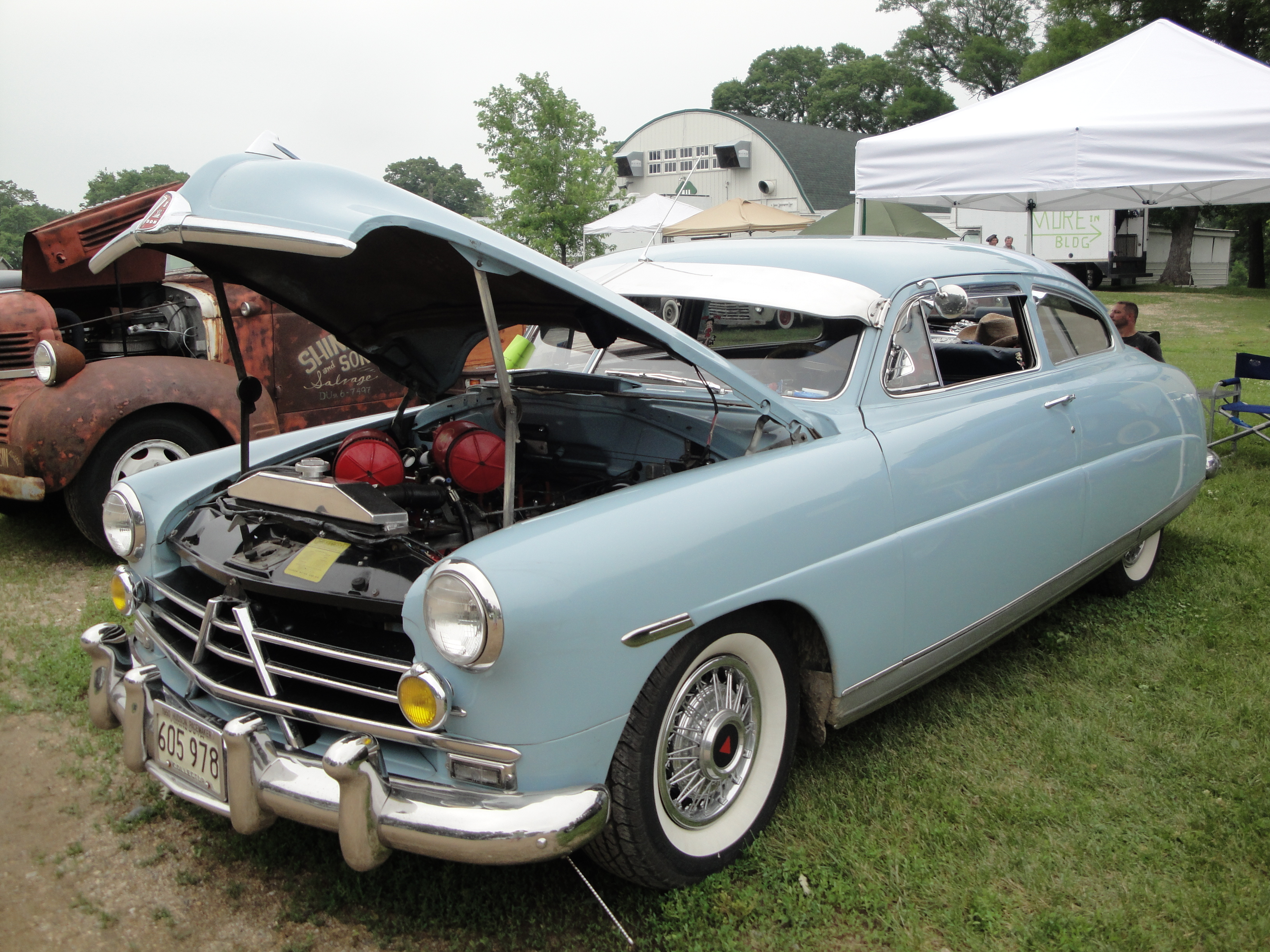
1950 Hudson Pacemaker Coupe (with non-standard wheels)

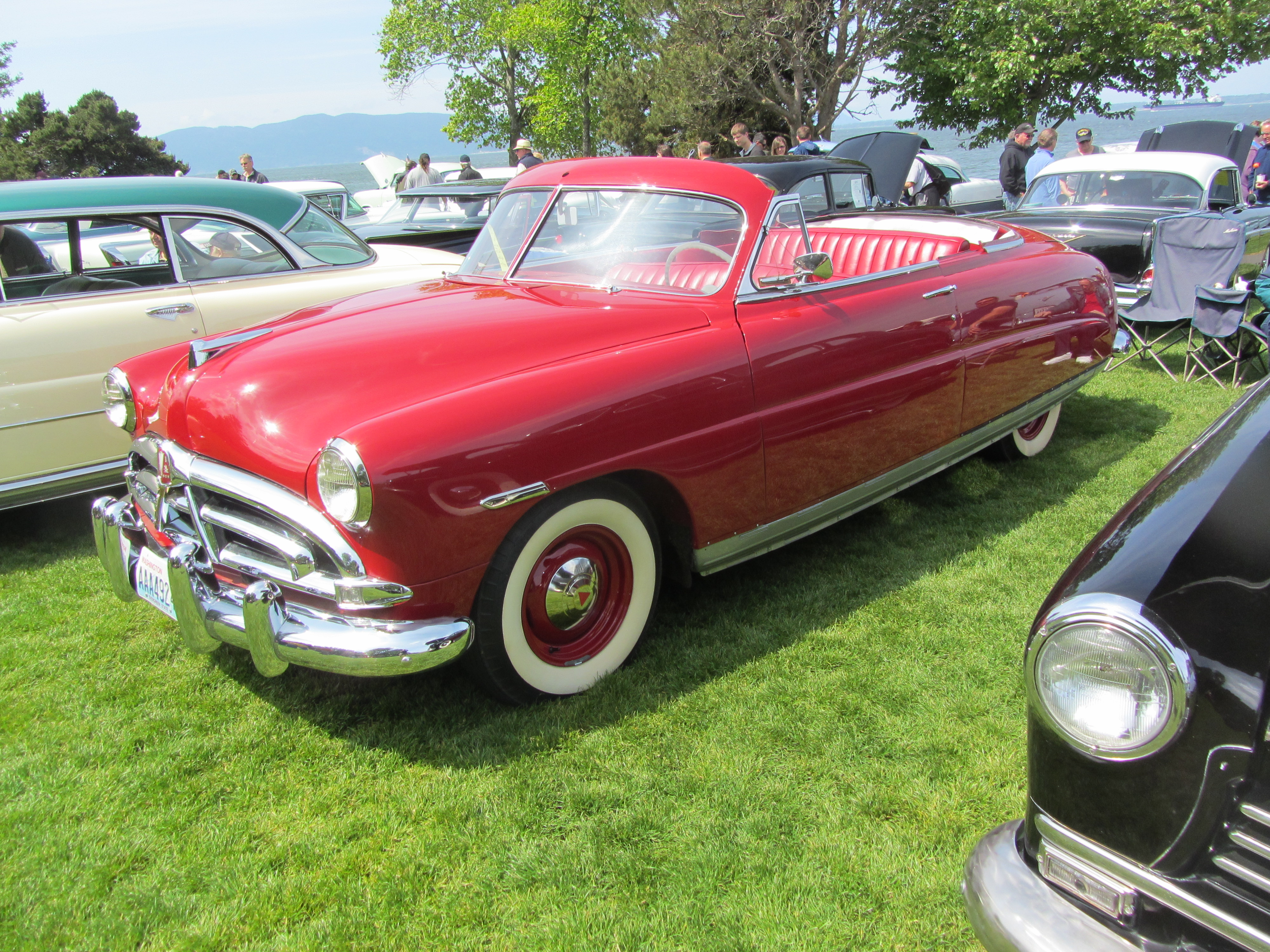
1951 Hudson Pacemaker Custom Convertible Brougham

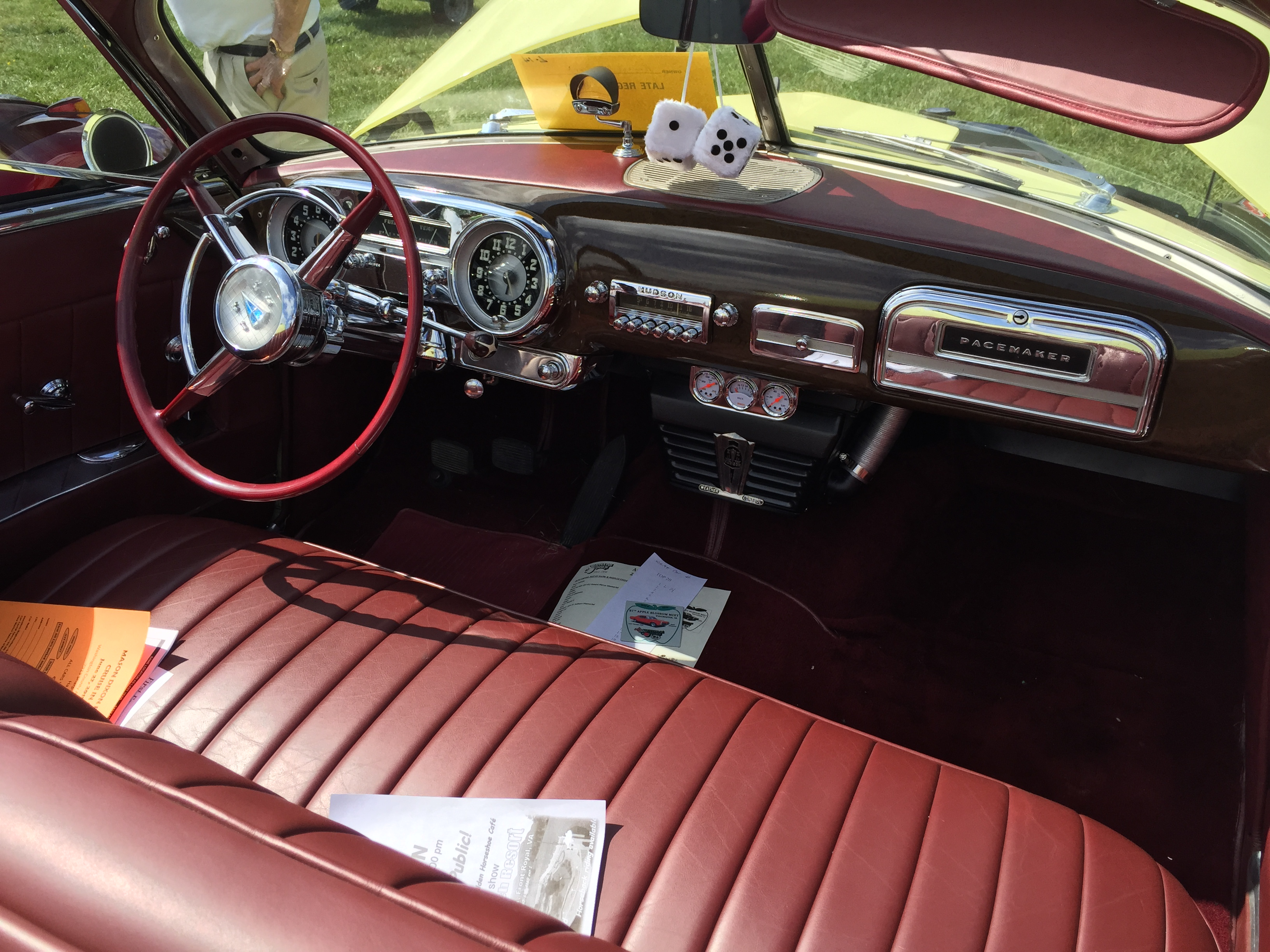
1951 Hudson Pacemaker convertible interior

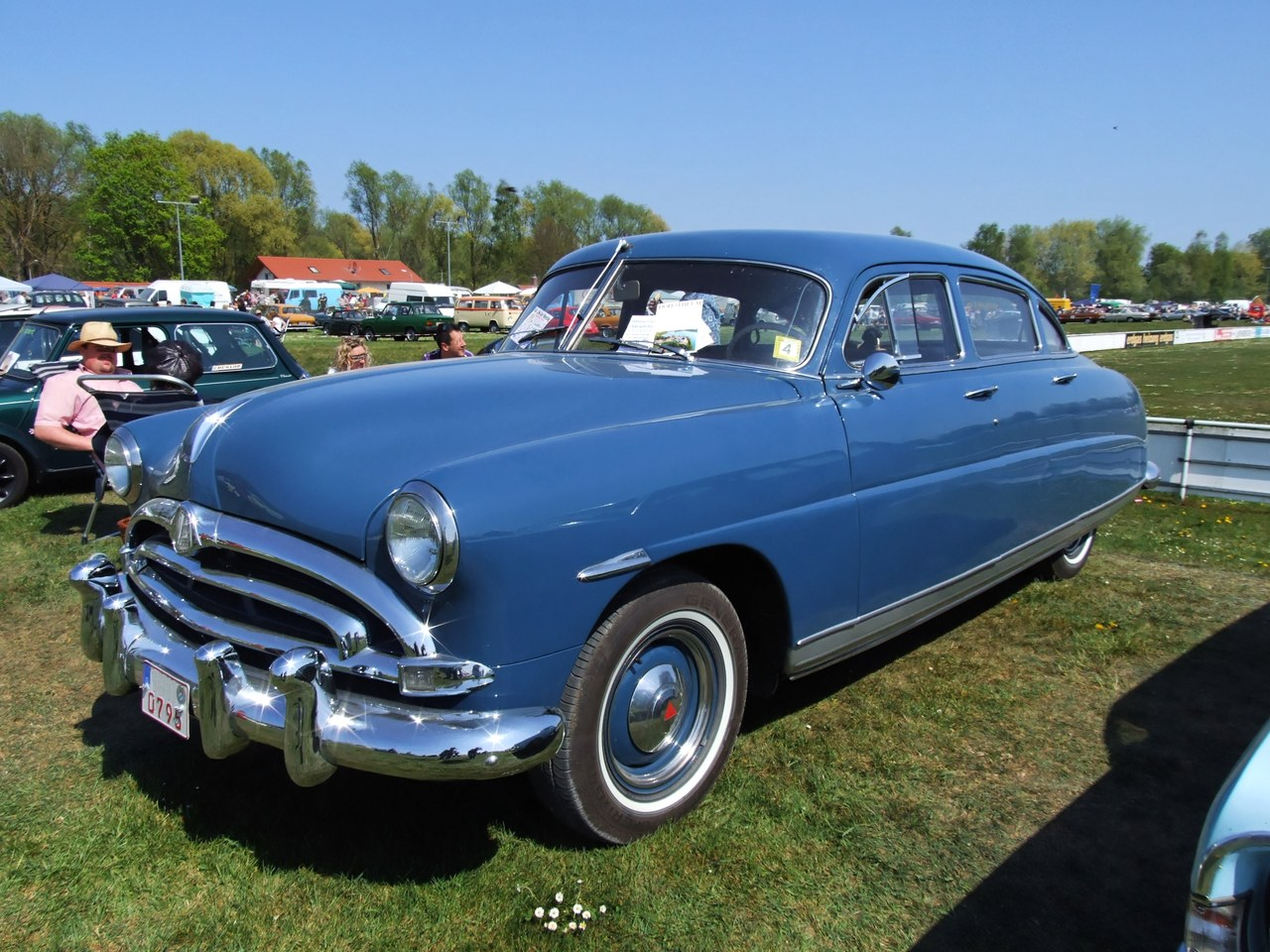
1952 Hudson Pacemaker Four-Door Sedan
