= Hudson Hornet =

Car produced by Hudson and American Motors (1951–1954)

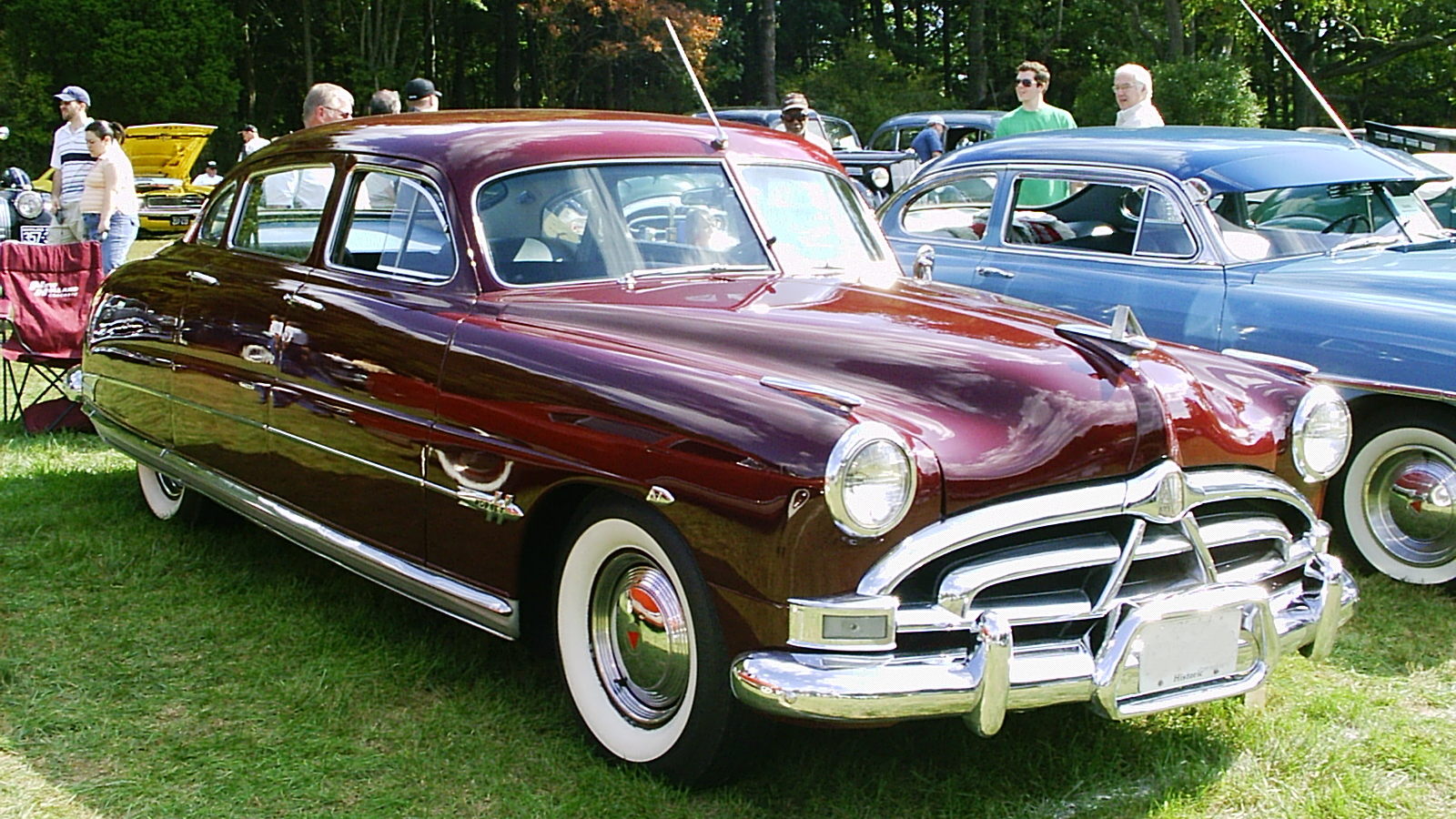
- 1951 Hudson Hornet (4-door sedan)

Overview
- Manufacturer: Hudson Motor Car Company (1951–1954); American Motors (1954–1957)
- Production: 1950–1957
- Model years: 1951–1957

Body and chassis
- Class: Full-size car; Muscle car
- Layout: FR layout

The Hudson Hornet is a full-size car manufactured by Hudson Motor Car Company of Detroit, Michigan, from 1951 through 1954 model years. When Nash-Kelvinator and Hudson merged in 1954 to form American Motors Corporation (AMC) the Hornet continued to be marketed under the Hudson Division of AMC through the 1957 model year.

The first-generation Hudson Hornets featured a functional "step-down" design with a dropped floor pan and a chassis with a lower center of gravity than contemporary vehicles, which helped the car handle well — an advantage for racing. The Hornet's lower and sleeker look was accentuated by streamlined styling, sometimes called "ponton" styling.

Following the merger that formed AMC in 1954, the Hudson and Nash dealer networks were initially retained; however, Hudson car production was consolidated at the Nash facility. The Hudson models shared common designs and components with the Nash Statesman/Ambassador unibody design. All second-generation Hudson Hornets were restyled Nash automobiles that were badge engineered as Hudsons.

== First generation ==
First generation
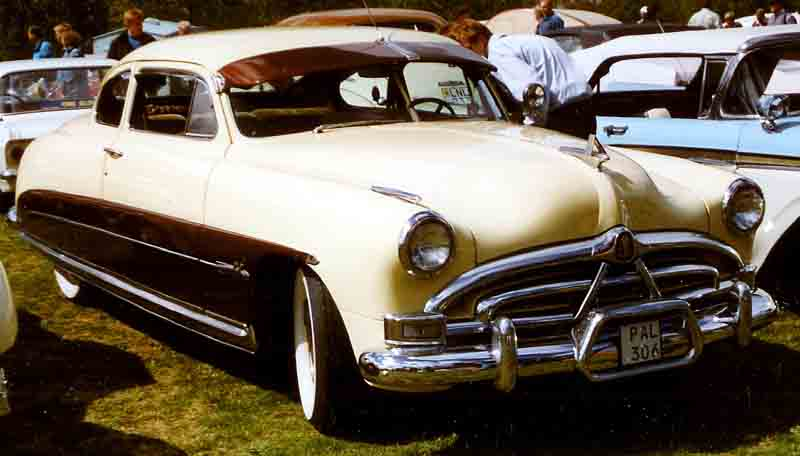
- 1951 Hudson Hornet coupe

Overview
- Production: 1950–1954
- Model years: 1951–1954
- Assembly: Detroit, Michigan, United States
- Designer: Frank Spring

Body and chassis
- Body style: 2-door coupe; 2-door sedan; 4-door sedan; 2-door hardtop; 2-door convertible

Powertrain
- Engine: 308 cu in (5.0 L) I6
- Transmission: 3-speed manual; 3-speed manual with overdrive; Hydramatic automatic (General Motors) automatic 1954 only (Borg Warner)

Dimensions
- Wheelbase: 124 in (3,150 mm)
- Length: 208 in (5,283 mm)
- Width: 77.5 in (1,968 mm)
- Height: 60 in (1,524 mm)
- Curb weight: 3,620 lb (1,642 kg)

The Hornet, introduced for the 1951 model year, was based on Hudson's "step-down" design introduced on the 1948 Commodore. Unlike a unibody, the design did not fully merge the body and chassis frame into a single structure. However, the floor pan footwells recessed down, between the car's chassis rails, which were, in turn, routed around them – instead of a conventional floor, sitting on top of straight ladder frame rails – a body-on-frame design that later became more widely adopted, and known as a perimeter frame. Thus, one "stepped down" into a Hudson. The step-down chassis and body meant the car's "lower center of gravity...was both functional and stylish. The car not only handled well, but treated its six passengers to a sumptuous ride. The low-slung look also had a sleekness about it that was accentuated by the nearly enclosed rear wheels."

=== 1951 ===
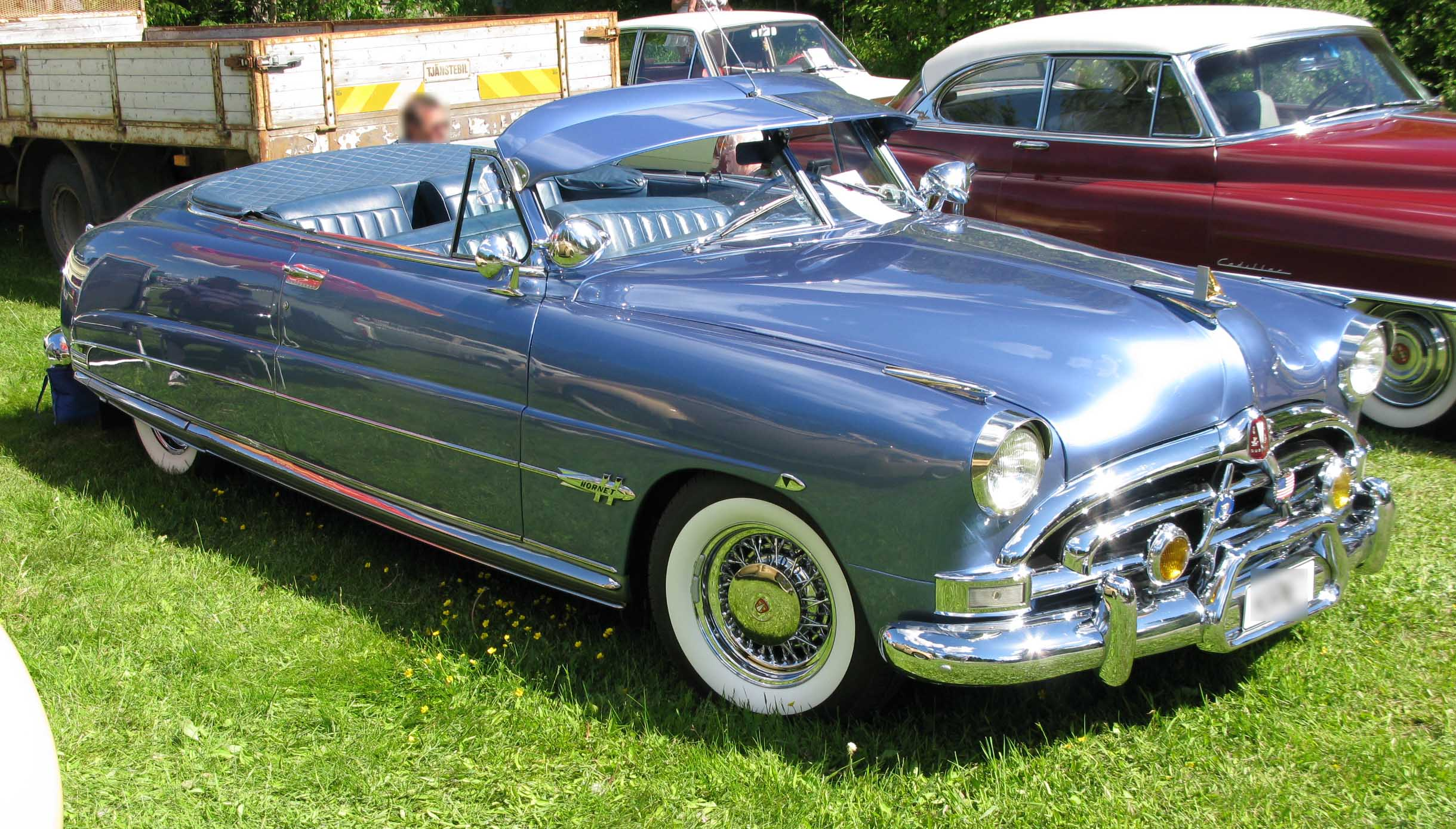
1951 Hudson Hornet Convertible Brougham

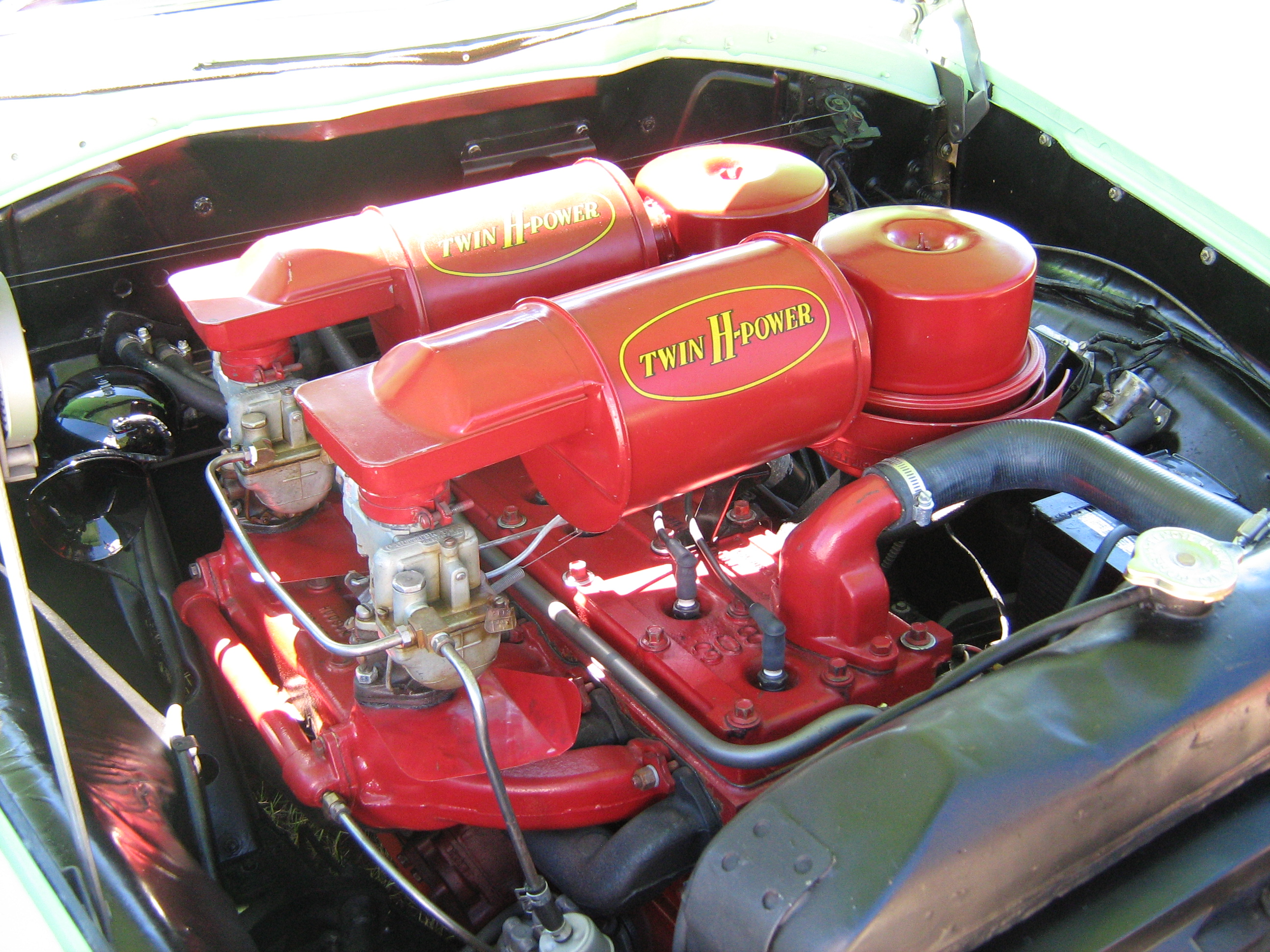
"Twin H-Power" engine

The new Hudson Hornets were available as a two-door coupe, a four-door sedan, a convertible, and a two-door pillarless hardtop. The models were priced the same as the Commodore Eight, which ranged from $2,543 to $3,099.

All Hornets from 1951 through 1953 were powered by Hudson's high-compression straight-six "H-145" engine. It was based on Hudson's previous 262 cu in (4.3 L) "Super Six" that was not only bored and stroked to increase displacement, but "thoroughly over-engineered in the Hudson tradition. a high-chromium-alloy block and other premium features." An electric clock was standard.

A factory-optional "Twin H-Power" featured twin one-barrel Carter carburetors with greater throat area and improved fuel distribution. This upgrade was first available in mid-1951 as a dealer-installed option at the cost of $85.60 (~$1,062 in 2025). At 308 cu in (5.0 L), the L-head (flathead or side-valve) design was the largest displacement six-cylinder engine used in mass-production cars at the time. The twin carburetor version produced 145 hp (108 kW) at 3800 rpm and 275 lb⋅ft (373 N⋅m) of torque.

The engine was also capable of far more power in the hands of precision tuners, including Marshall Teague, who claimed he could get 112 miles per hour (180.2 km/h) from an AAA- or NASCAR-certified stock Hornet, as well as Hudson engineers who developed "severe usage" options (thinly disguised racing parts). The combination of the Hudson engine with overall road-ability of the Hornets, plus the fact the cars were over-designed and over-built, made them unbeatable in competition on the dirt and the very few paved tracks of the 1950s.

Hudson Hornet 1951 model year production totaled 43,666 units.

=== 1952 ===
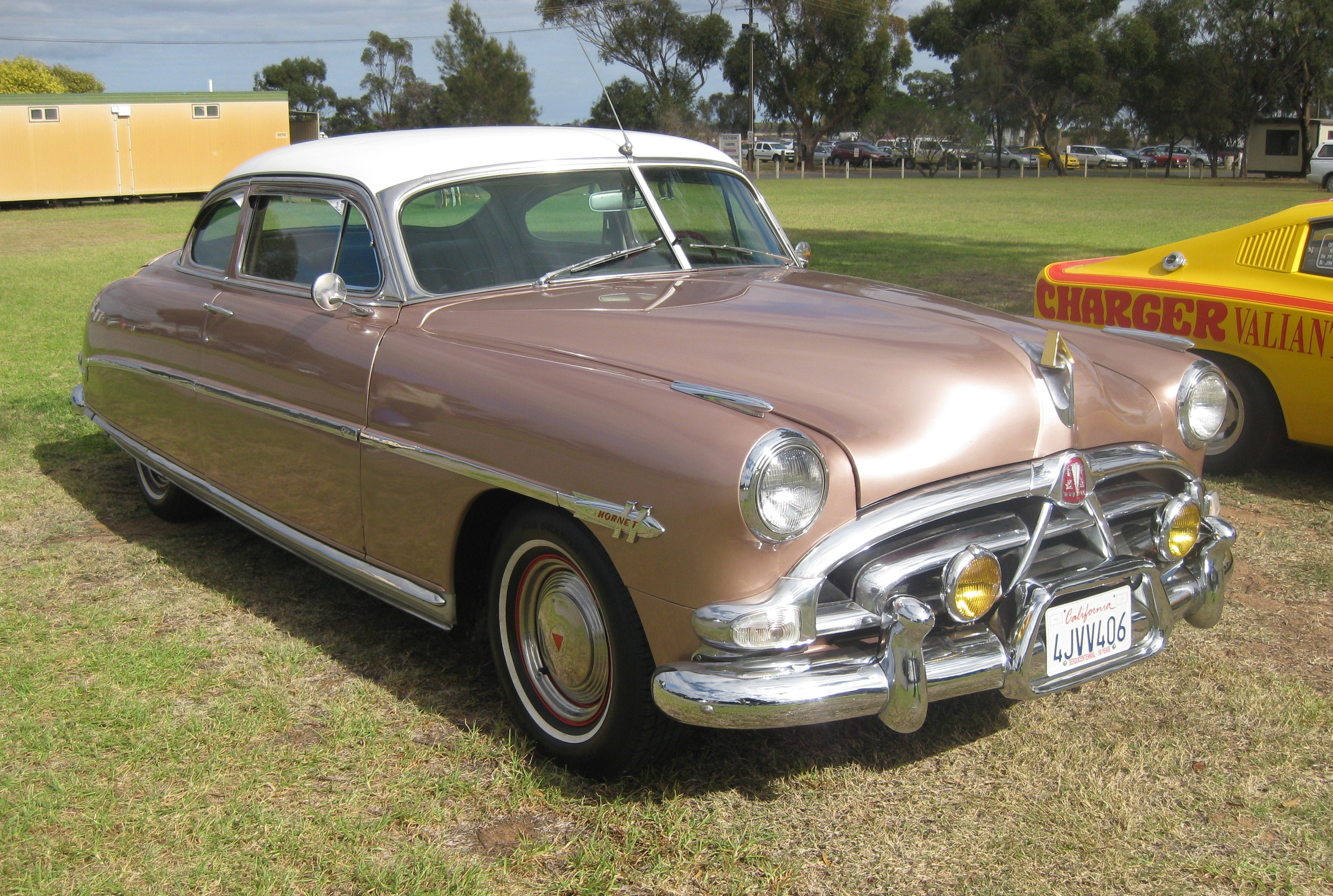
1952 Hudson Hornet Club Coupe

The 1952 model year included the "Twin H-Power" engine as standard equipment, featuring dual single-barrel carburetors and a dual-intake manifold. Dubbed "H-145", the engine was rated at 145 hp (108 kW; 147 PS) with a 7.2 to 1 compression ratio. An aluminum head and an available iron-alloy head with compression ratios of 6.7 or 7.2 were available at no extra cost.

The 1952 Hornets received only minor cosmetic enhancements and still closely resembled the 1948 Commodore.

The Hornet proved to be nearly invincible in stock-car racing. Despite its racing successes, sales began to languish. Hudson's competitors, using separate body-on-frame designs, could change the look of their models every year without costly chassis alterations, whereas the Hornet's modern, sophisticated unibody design was expensive to update, so it was essentially locked in and suffered against the planned obsolescence of the domestic Big Three (General Motors, Ford, and Chrysler) automakers.

A total of 35,921 Hornets were produced for 1952.

=== 1953 ===
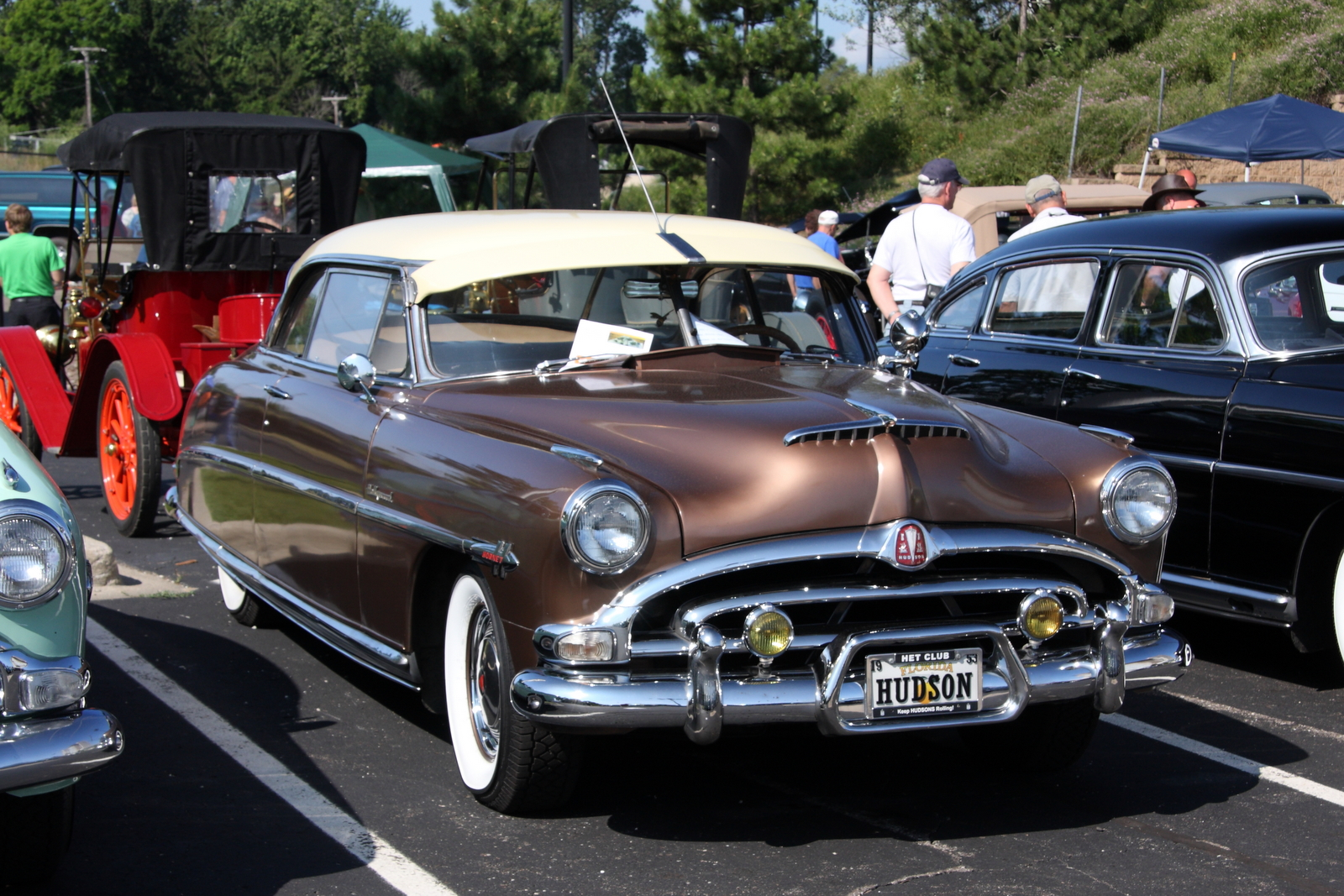
1953 Hudson Hornet Hollywood Hardtop

The 1953 model year brought minor changes to the Hudson Hornet. The front end was modified with a new grille and a non-functional air scoop hood ornament. four different body designs: two-door club coupe, four-door sedan, Hollywood hardtop, and Convertible Brougham.

Hudson Hornet 1953 model year production totaled 27,208 units, of which around 910 were the Hollywood hardtops. An 8-tube radio was a $100 option.

=== 1954 ===
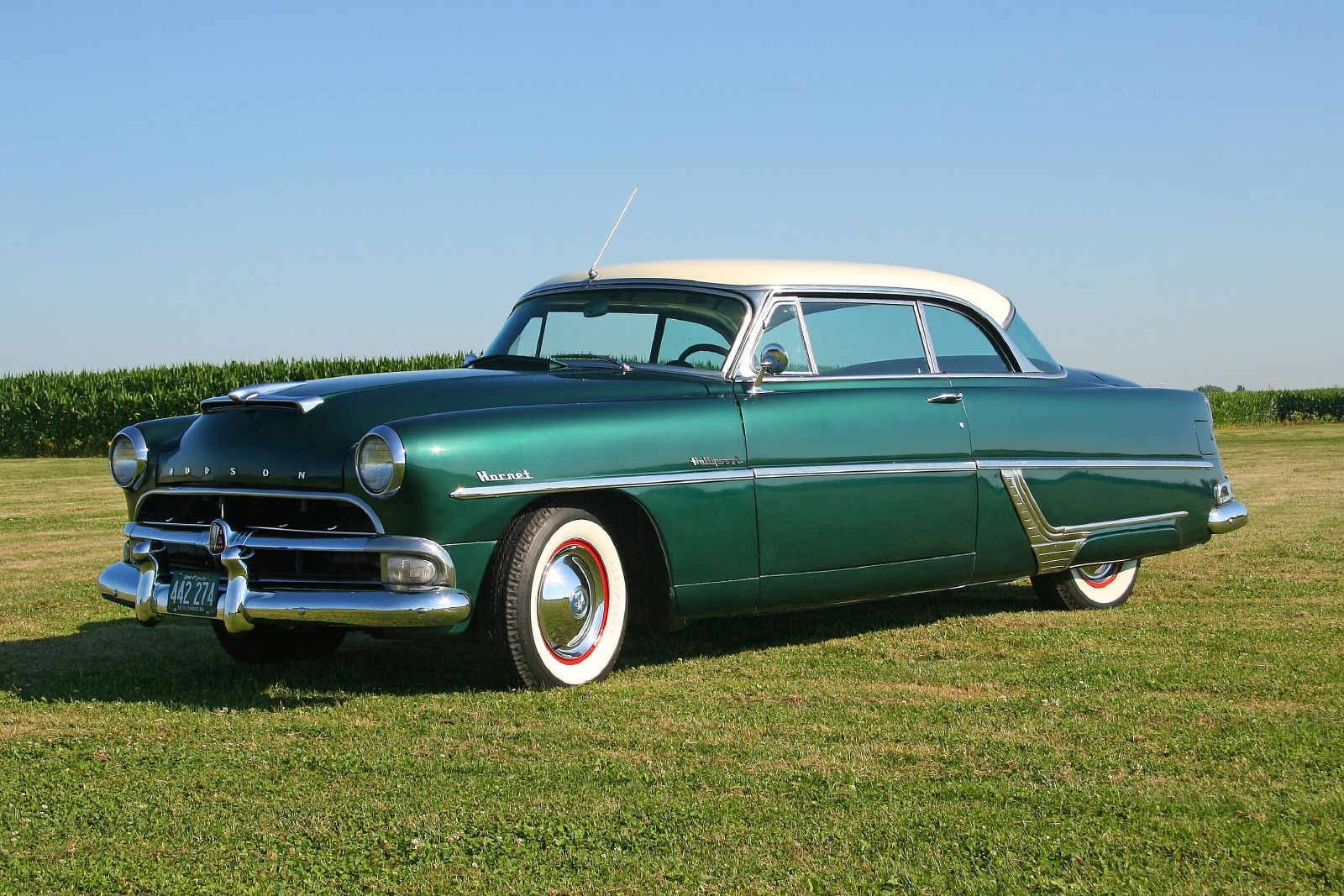
1954 Hudson Hornet Hollywood Hardtop

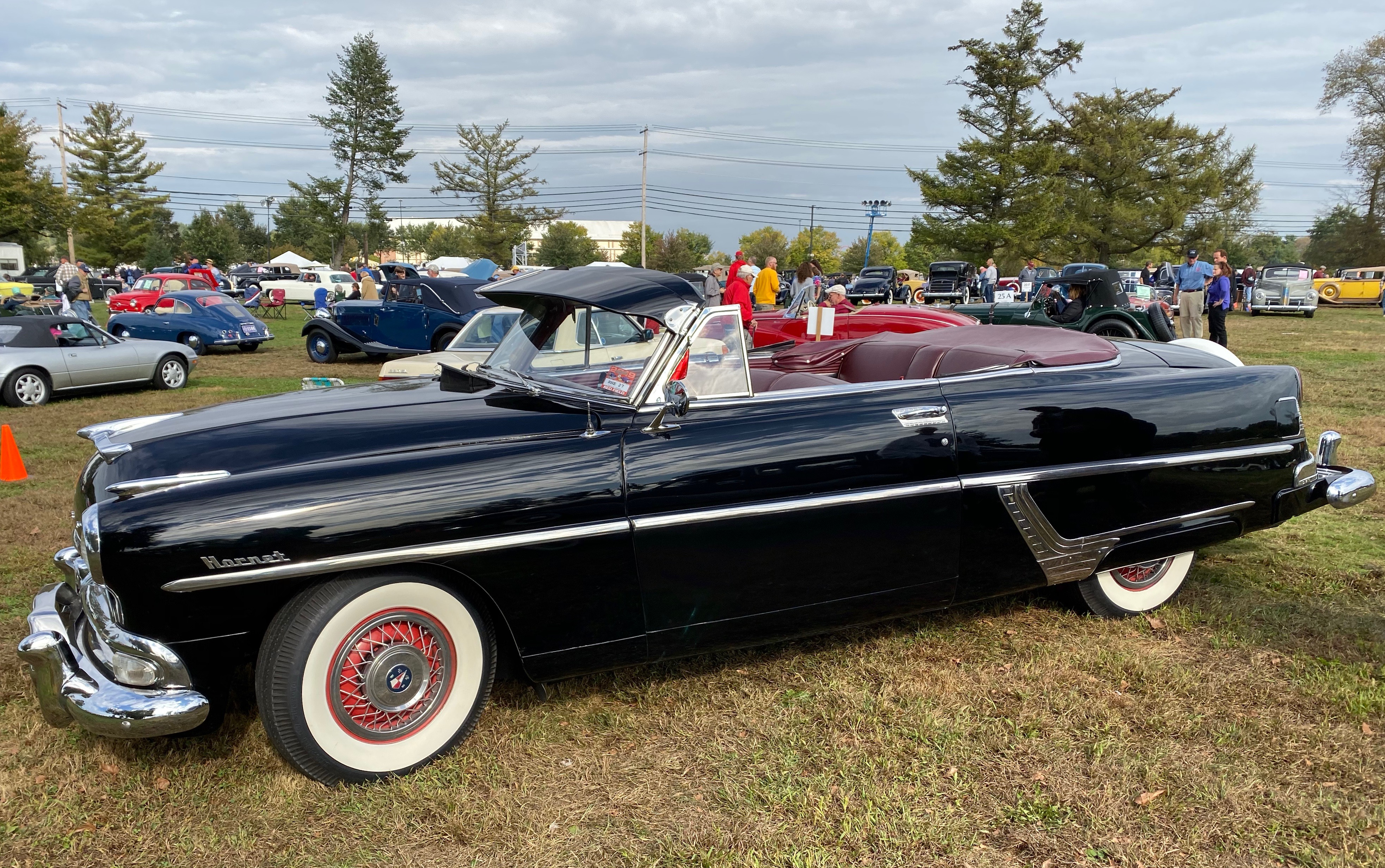
1954 Hudson Hornet convertible

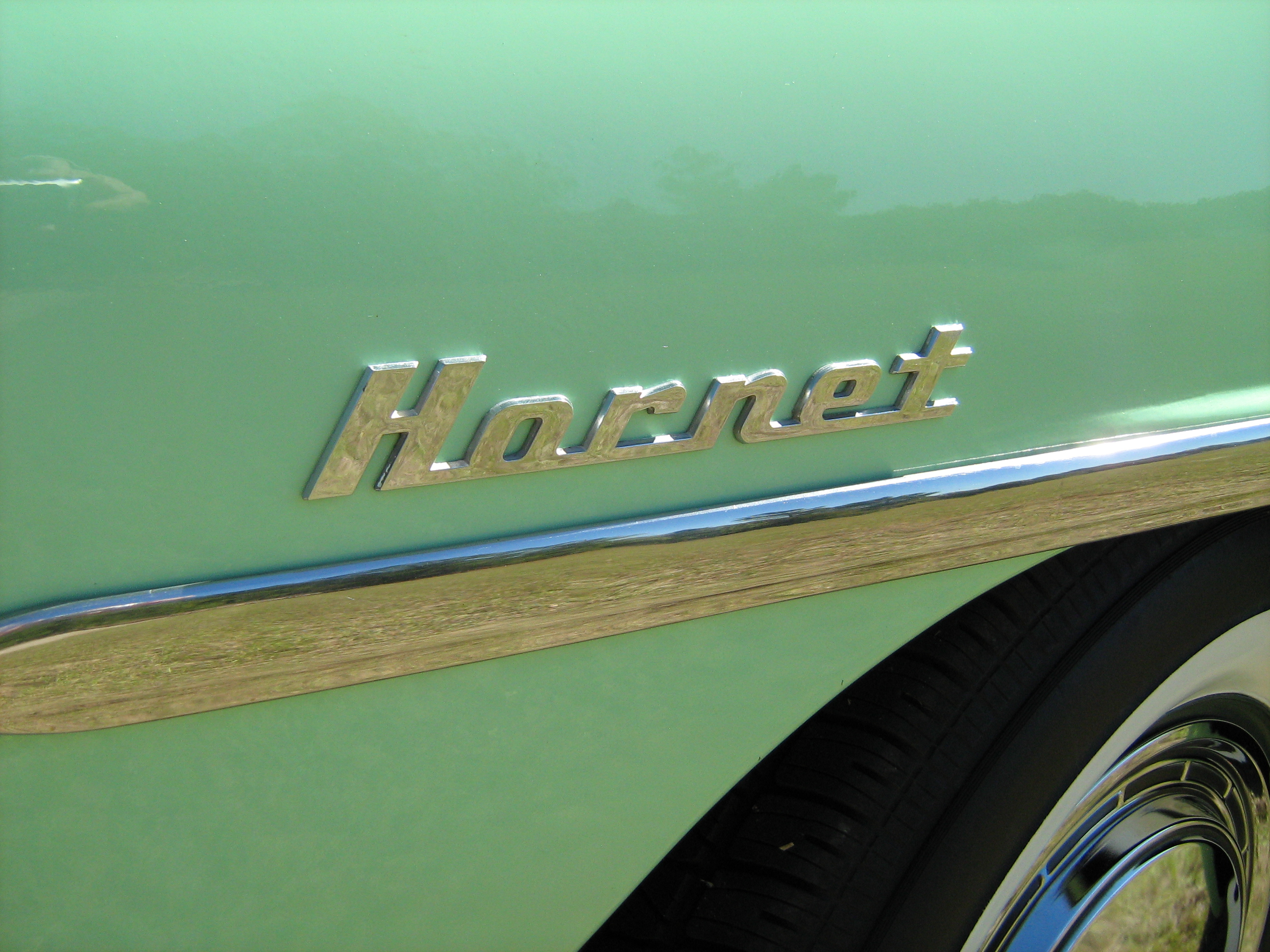
Hornet nameplate

For the 1954 model year, the Hornet underwent a major, more square-lined redesign to match the look of the compact Hudson Jet introduced in 1953. This entailed extensive retooling due to the way the step-down frame wrapped around the passenger compartment. The front had a simpler grille that complemented the now-functional hood scoop. A new one-piece curved windshield replaced the dual unit, the sides gained period-typical fender chrome accents, and the formerly sloped rear end was squared off. The front to rear fender line was styled to make the car look longer. The taillamps were also redesigned. The standard functional scoop on the hood directed cold air to the carburetors and was considered "ventilation" in 1954, rather than ram air. In 1954, power output was increased from 145 to 170 hp (108 to 127 kW). However, the engine could be tuned to produce 210 hp (157 kW) when equipped with the "7-X" modifications that Hudson made available.

The interior was also updated with a new dash and instrument cluster that "were surprisingly modern". An example is a Hornet owner writing for Popular Mechanics in 1999, noting that "the car's unique, low slung appearance and silky handling earned Hudson an image that — for many buyers — eclipsed luxury marques like Cadillac."

As with all previous model years, no V8 engine was available (similar to the Chevrolet models from 1918 to 1954), making the 308 cu in (5.0 L) I6 standard in Hornets. It was rated at 160 hp (119 kW) with the 170 hp (127 kW; 172 PS) "Twin-H-Power" (dual one-barrel carburetors) optional. Both versions operated on regular-grade gasoline featuring an aluminum cylinder head with a 7.5 to 1 compression ratio as standard and an optional cast-iron head with a 7.0 to 1 ratio. A 7-X version of the engine was offered as a factory option, producing over 210 hp (157 kW; 213 PS) using a high compression head, special camshaft, and other "severe usage" parts designed for racing. The engine was more powerful than the contemporary low-priced competition (the Chevrolet I6 and Ford V8) and was close to the V8 engines offered by the medium-priced competition (Oldsmobile and Buick). The Hornet's performance delivered up to 100 mph (161 km/h) and "quasi-thrifty" 17 mpg_{‑US} (14 L/100 km; 20 mpg_{‑imp}) fuel economy.

The updated Hornet Brougham convertible, the only open-top body design available from Hudson was considered attractive, but was evaluated as overpriced at $3,288 (~$31,229 in 2025) for a six-cylinder car in 1954. This top-line model included hydraulic window lifts and leather upholstery in either blue, maroon, or green and the fabric tops available in either maroon, black, or tan. A total of 540 convertibles were built.

Although the Hornet's redesign positioned it on par with its contemporaries in terms of looks and style, it came too late to boost sales. Hudson's financial difficulties were overshadowed by negotiations about a merger with Nash-Kelvinator to form American Motors Corporation. Hudson's board of directors approved the merger on 14 January 1954. This was ratified by shareholders on 24 March 1954, thus forming the new American Motors Corporation on 1 May 1954. Further production of Hudson cars was to be in Nash's Kenosha, Wisconsin, with the last Detroit-built Hudson being built on 30 October 1954.

Hudson Hornet 1954 model year production of all body styles totaled 24,833.

==== Customized hardtop ====
A 1954 Hornet two-door hardtop was customized by Harold Du Charme of Grosse Pointe, Michigan, who was a major stockholder in the automaker. He disliked the redesign of the 1954 cars. He proposed changes to improve Hudson's flagging sales. Modifications included a 2.5-inch (64 mm) top chopping and channeling the midsection 4 inches (102 mm) as well as repositioned headlamps in an egg-crate grille, twin hood scoops, extended rear fenders with Lincoln taillights, and a continental kit.

== NASCAR fame ==
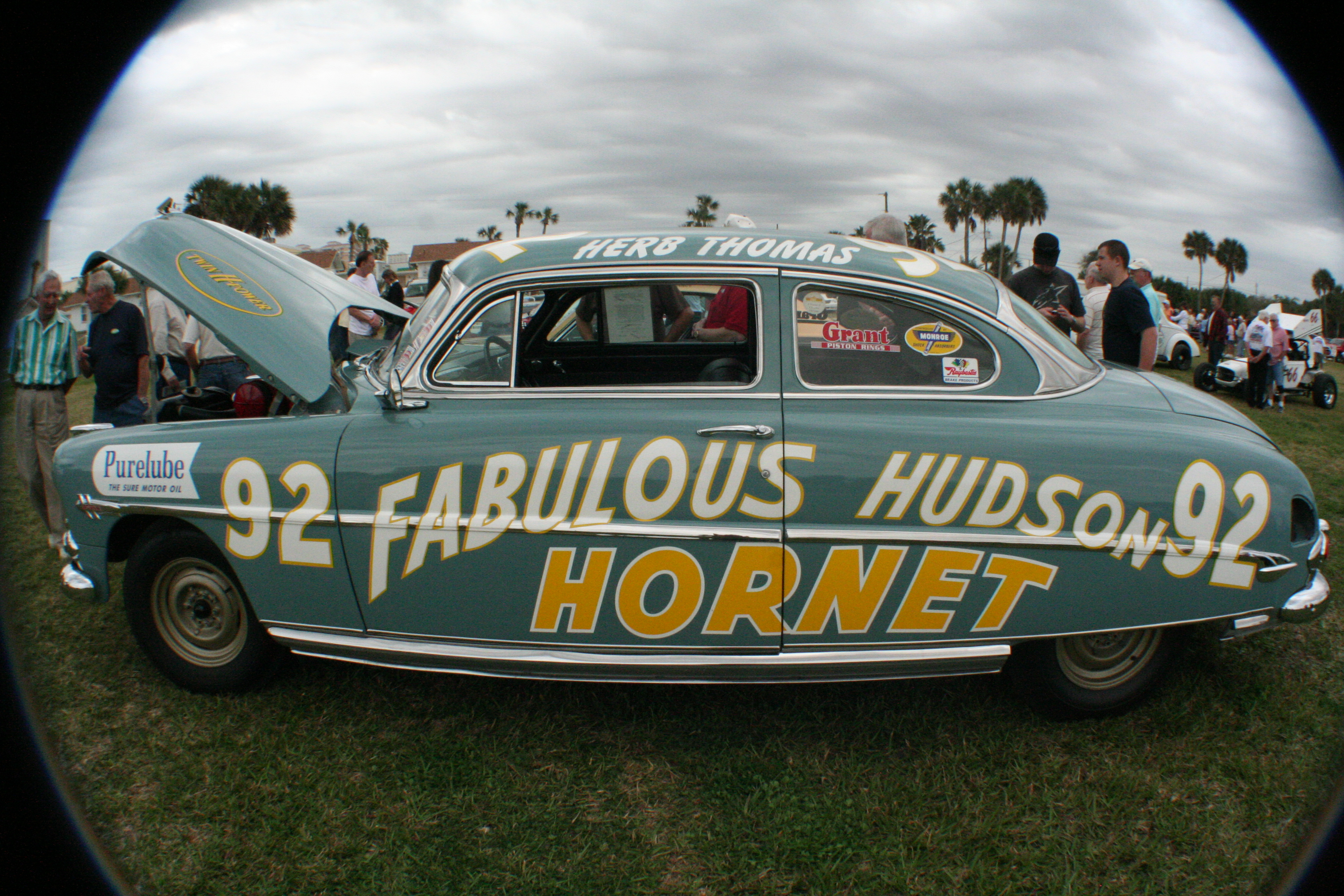
Herb Thomas's #92 "Fabulous" Hudson Hornet

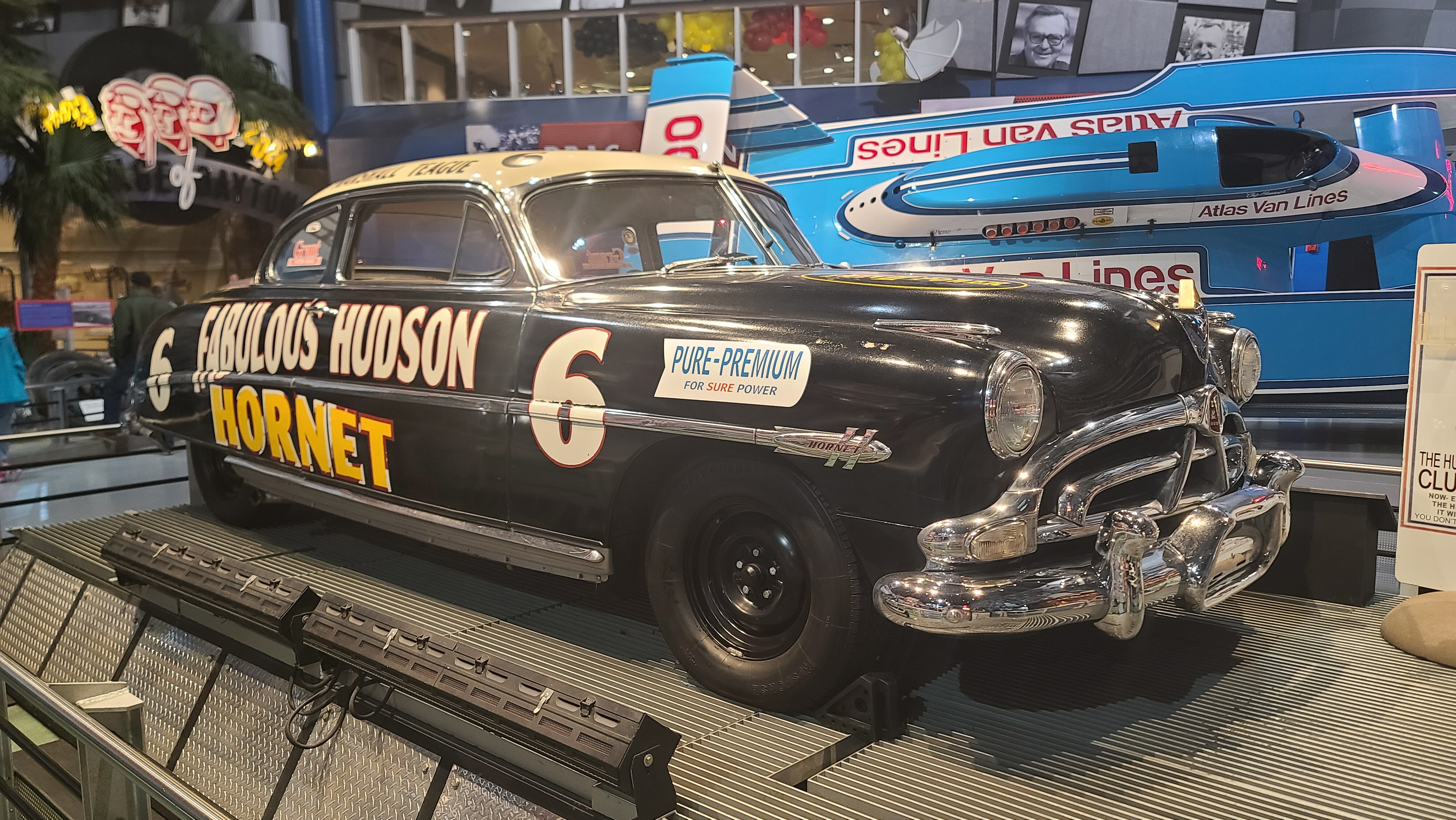
Marshall Teague's "Fabulous" Hudson Hornet stock car on display at the Motorsports Hall of Fame at Daytona International Speedway

Hudson was the first automobile manufacturer to get involved in stock car racing. The Hornet "dominated stock car racing in the early-1950s, when stock car racers actually raced stock cars."

During 1952, Marshall Teague finished the 1952 AAA season with a 1000-point lead over his closest rival, winning 12 of the 13 scheduled events. Hornets driven by NASCAR aces Herb Thomas, Dick Rathmann, Al Keller, Frank Mundy, and Tim Flock won 27 NASCAR races driving for the Hudson team. In total, the Hudson Hornet won 48 first place finishes and came in second 23 times in 1952.

In the AAA racing circuit, Teague drove a stock Hornet that he called the Fabulous Hudson Hornet to 14 wins during the season. This brought the Hornet's season record to 40 wins in 48 events, a winning percentage of 83%.

Overall, Hudson won 27 of the 34 NASCAR Grand National races in 1952, followed by 22 wins of 37 in 1953, and captured 17 of the 37 races in 1954 — "an incredible accomplishment, especially from a car that had some legitimate luxury credentials."

The original Fabulous Hudson Hornet can be found today fully restored in Ypsilanti, Michigan, at the Ypsilanti Automotive Heritage Museum, a facility that was formerly home to Miller Motors, the last Hudson dealership in the world.

== Second generation ==
Second generation
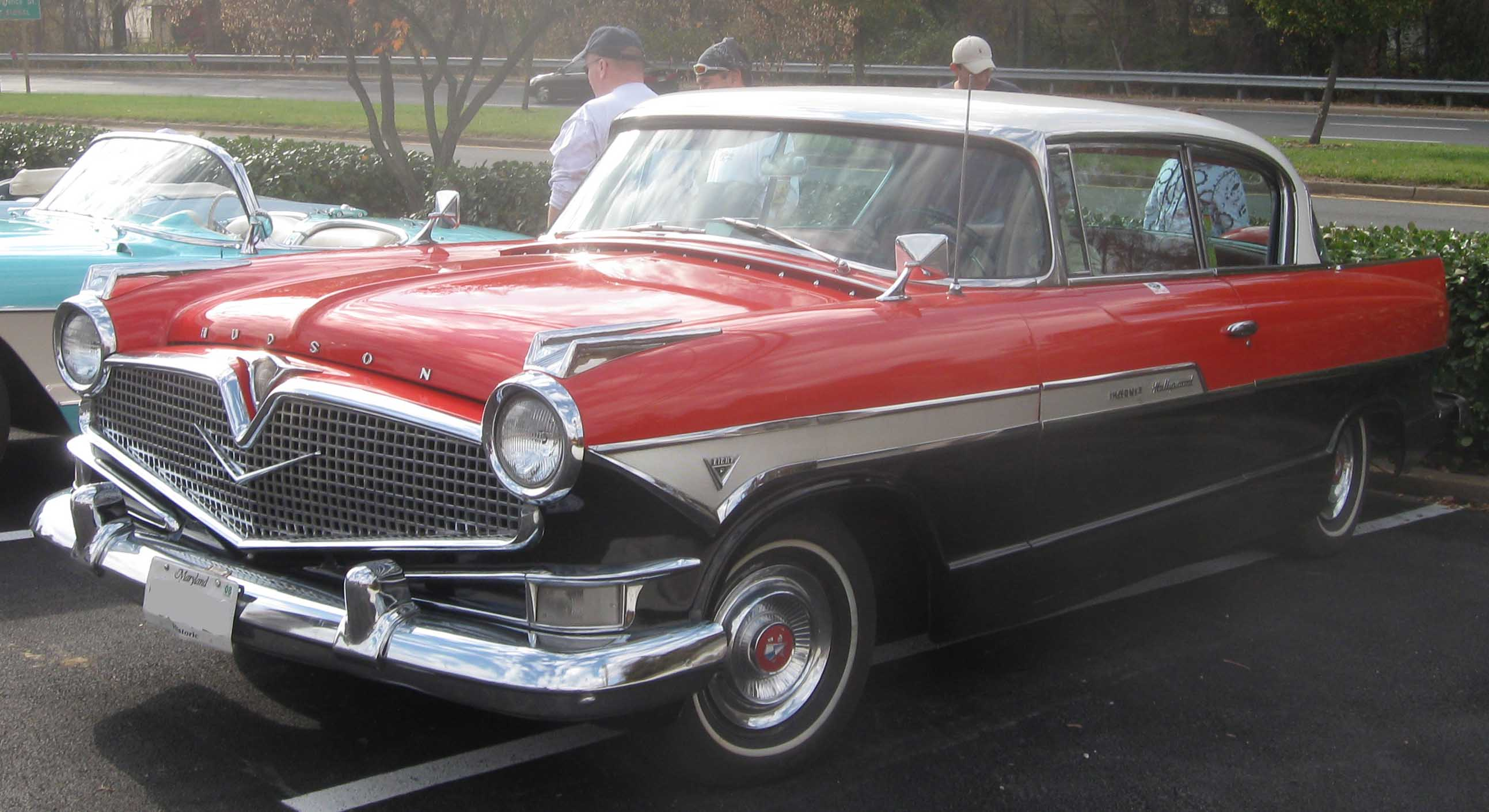
- 1957 Hudson Hornet V8 Super Hollywood Hardtop

Overview
- Production: 1955–1957
- Assembly: Kenosha, Wisconsin, United States
- Designer: Edmund E. Anderson, Frank Spring

Body and chassis
- Body style: 4-door sedan; 2-door hardtop

Powertrain
- Engine: 308 cu in (5.0 L) I6; 320 cu in (5.2 L) Packard V8 (1955-early-56); 250 cu in (4.1 L) AMC V8 (late-56); 327 cu in (5.4 L) AMC V8 (1957)
- Transmission: 3-speed manual; 3-speed manual with overdrive; Hydramatic automatic with I6; Ultramatic automatic with V8

Dimensions
- Wheelbase: 121.25 in (3,080 mm); 1956 Special: 114.25 in (2,902 mm)
- Length: 209 in (5,309 mm); 1956 Special: 202 in (5,131 mm)
- Width: 78 in (1,981 mm)
- Height: 60 in (1,524 mm)
- Curb weight: I6: 3,495 lb (1,585 kg); V8 Hornet Special: 3,467 lb (1,573 kg)

The second-generation Hornet was produced by the newly formed American Motors Corporation (AMC). Following the 1954 merger of the Hudson Motor Car Company and Nash-Kelvinator, Hudson's Detroit manufacturing facility was closed, and Hudson car production was shifted to Nash's Kenosha, Wisconsin, assembly lines. No longer built on the "Step-down" platform, all Hornets were now based on designs and components of the large (senior) Nash Statesman/Ambassador models. They were badge engineered with distinctive Hudson styling themes. To help differentiate the consolidated models, the Hudson straight six was retained as an engine option.

=== 1955 ===
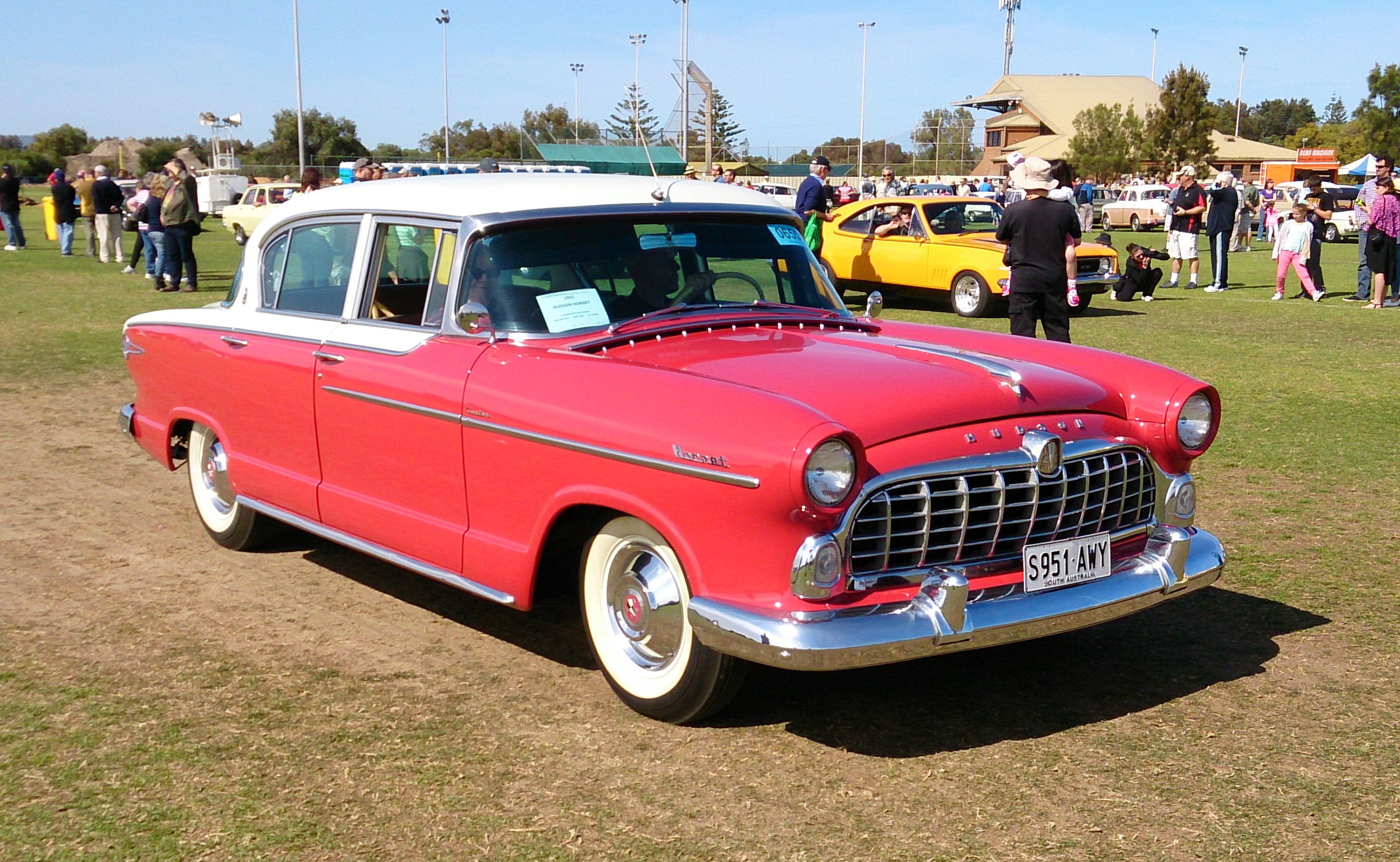
1955 Hudson Hornet Custom four-door sedan

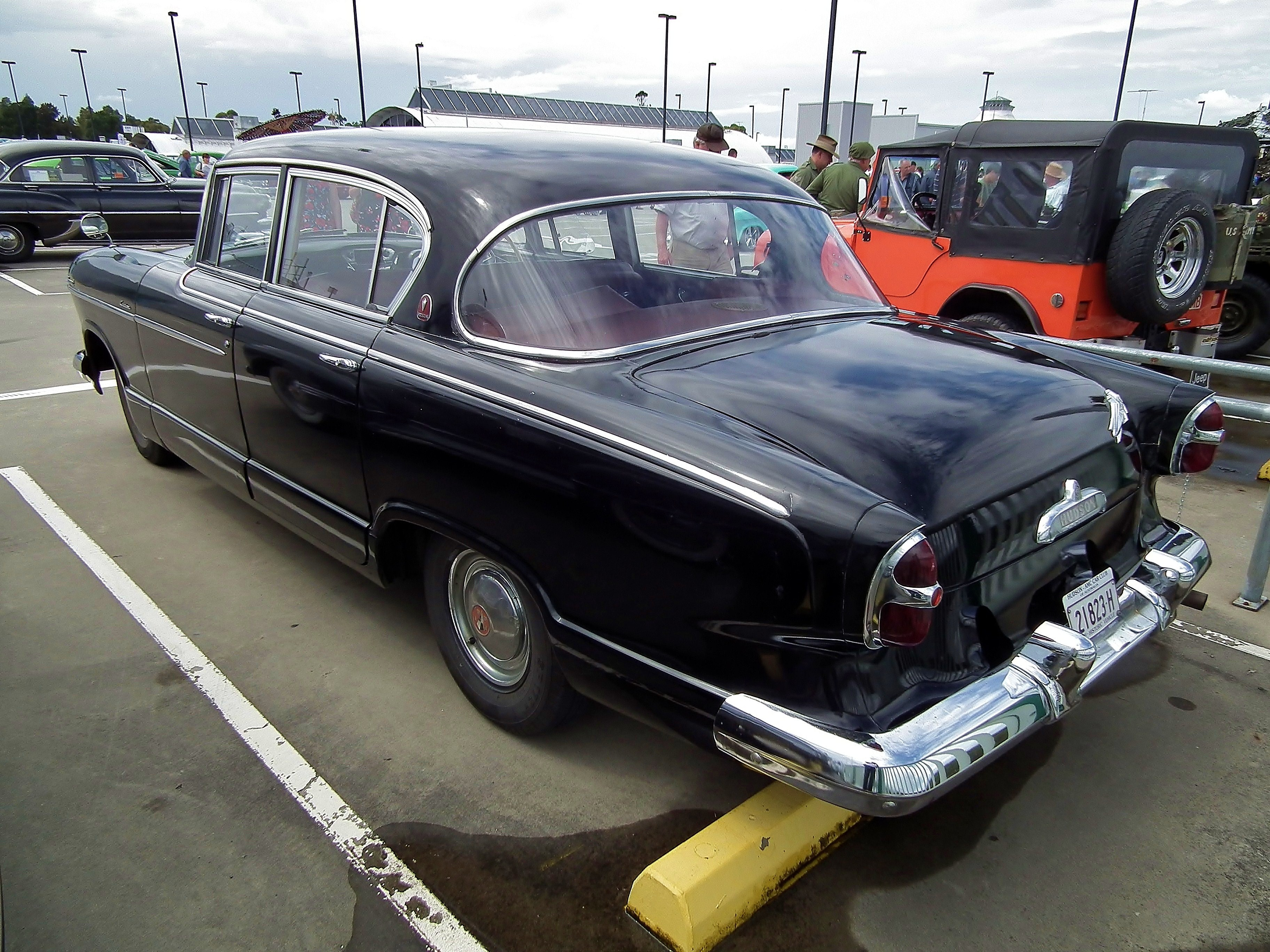
1955 Hudson Hornet Custom four-door sedan

The 1955 Hudson senior models were built on the Nash platform with styling themes by Pinin Farina, Edmund Anderson, and Frank Spring. The cars featured a front end that was originally designed by Spring and the Hudson stylists for an updated 1955 version of the 1954 Hudson "Step-Down" platform.

The new models were delayed to a January 1955 introduction, "as American Motors engineers work out the problem of making two completely different looking automobiles with identical body shells."

As the first entirely new car from American Motors, the 1955 Hudson emerged conservatively styled compared to the competition. The 1955 Hornet was the cleanest model with a broad egg-crate grille and distinctive two-toning. Sedan and hardtop body styles were offered, but the coupe and convertible were no longer available. The 1955 Hornets shared the styling with the new Wasps, but featured a longer 121.25 in (3,080 mm) wheelbase.

The 308 cu in (5.0 L) straight-six engine continued in 160 bhp (119 kW) or 170 bhp (127 kW) versions. For the first time, the Hornet could be ordered with a Packard-built 320 cu in (5.2 L) V8 engine producing 208 bhp (155 kW) and Packard's Ultramatic automatic transmission. The rear suspension received a torque tube system for the driveshaft and coil spring rear suspension along with front springs that are twice as long as most other cars.

Along with Nash, the new Hudsons had the widest front seats in the industry. Two trim levels were available, Super and Custom, with the Custom series including a continental tire carrier, a 16 in (406 mm) "table-like" center armrest for the rear seat, a padded dashboard, transparent sun visors, and an over the windshield interior package net.

The Weather Eye heating and ventilation with an optional air conditioning system were highly rated in terms of efficiency. The integrated placement of major air conditioning systems under the hood and the price of only $395 (about half the cost as on other cars) also won praise. Automotive journalist Floyd Clymer rated the Hudson Hornet as the safest car built in the United States because of (1) the single unit welded body, (2) high-quality braking system with an added mechanical backup system, (3) roadability, general handling, and maneuverability; as well as (4) excellent acceleration and power for emergency situations.

Marketing efforts included incentives such as the "Dealer Volume Investment Fund" and "Sun Valley Sweepstakes" targeting salespeople as well as a contest for the general public with the possibility of new cars and trips to Disneyland as top prizes. Production for the 1955 model year totaled 10,010 four-door sedans and 3,324 Hollywood two-door hardtops.

=== 1956 ===
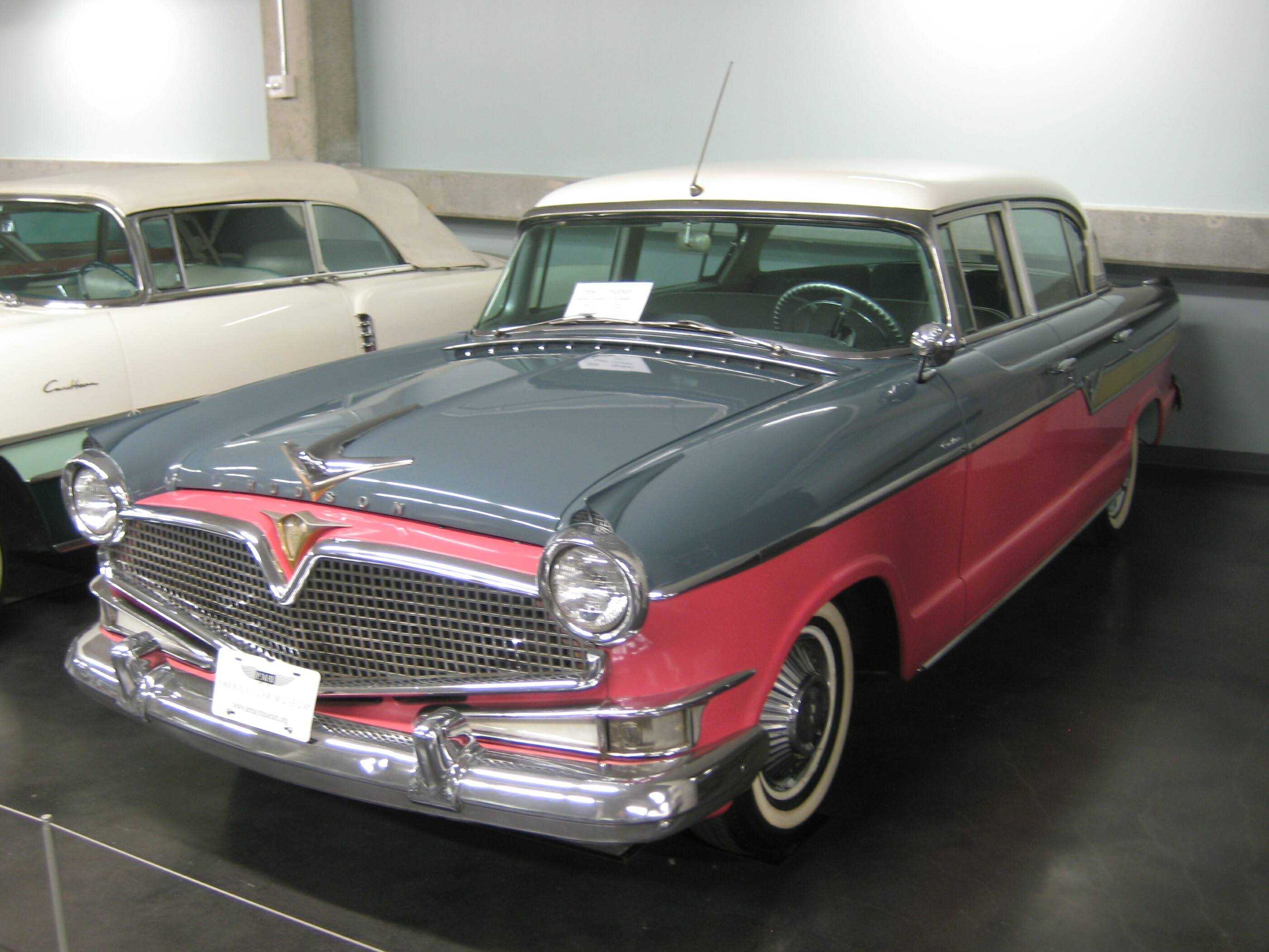
1956 Hudson Hornet Custom Four-Door Sedan

For the 1956 model year, AMC executives decided to give the Hornet more character and the design for the vehicles was given over to designer Richard Arbib, who provided the Hornet and Wasp with one of the more distinctive looks in the 1950s which he called "V-Line Styling". Taking the traditional Hudson tri-angle, Arbib applied its "V" form in every conceivable manner across the interior and exterior of the car. Combined with tri-tone paint combinations, Hudson's look was unique and immediately noticeable.

The legendary 308 cu in (5.0 L) straight-six engine, with and without Twin-H Power, was offered and gained 5 hp (4 kW) for 1956. However, Packard's V8 engine was available only during the first half of 1956. In the mid-model year, the Hornet Special was introduced featuring a lower price and AMC's new 250 cu in (4.1 L) 190 hp (142 kW) V8 engine. The Hornet Special models were built on a 7-inch (178 mm) shorter and slightly lighter Statesman/Wasp four-door sedan and two-door hardtop platform with Hornet trim.

The 1956 design failed to excite buyers and Hudson Hornet sales decreased to 8,152 units, of which 6,512 were four-door sedans and 1,640 Hollywood two-door hardtops.

=== 1957 ===
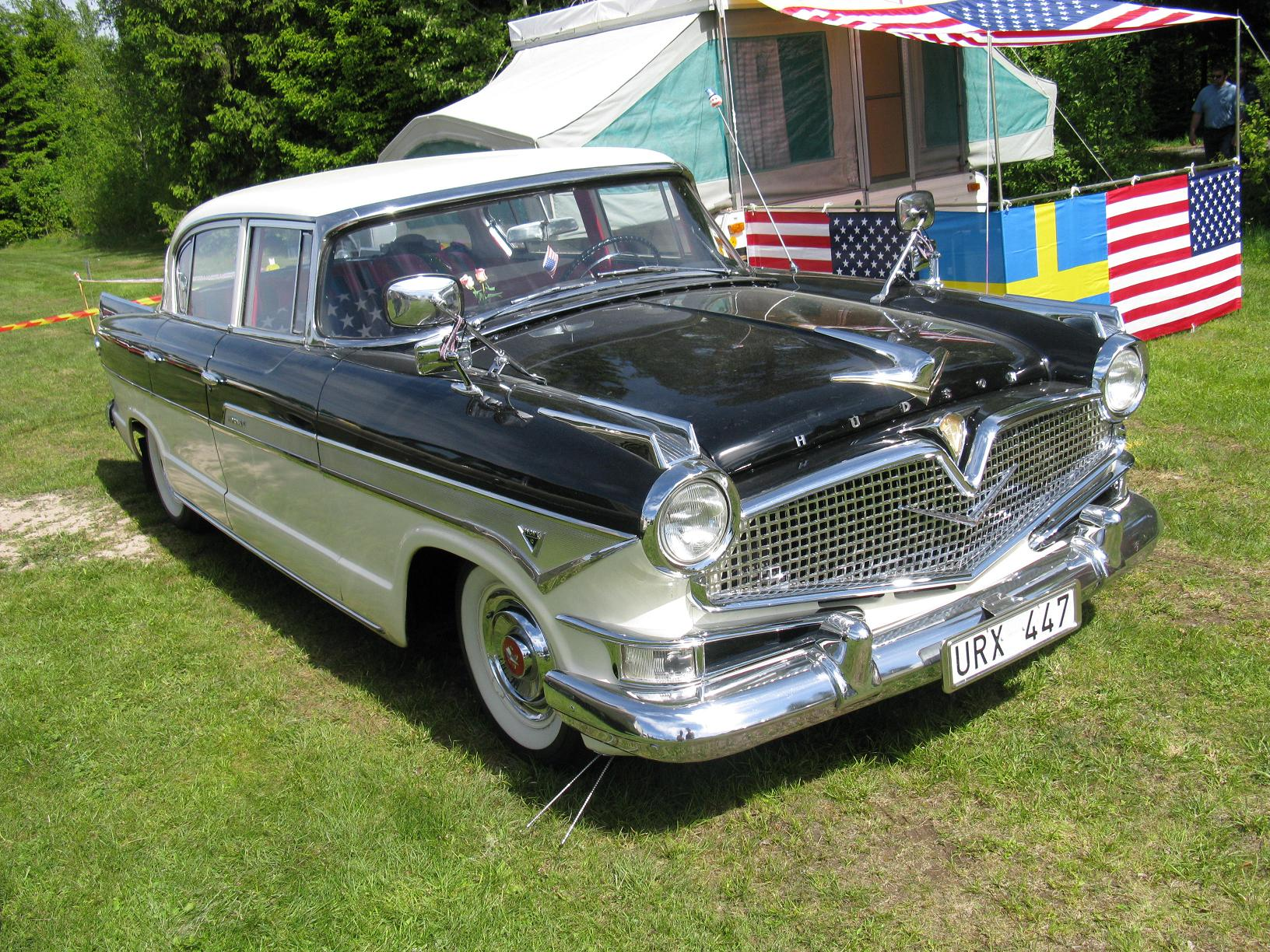
1957 Hudson Hornet Custom Sedan

In 1957, the historic Hudson name came only in a Hornet model in either "Super" and "Custom" trims available in a four-door sedan or a two-door "Hollywood" hardtop body styles. For the second year, the V-Line styling featured an enormous egg-crate grille, creases and chrome strips on the body sides, and was available in one of five tri-tone schemes for the Custom models. There was more ornamentation to the cars, including fender "finettes" atop the rounded rear quarter panels for 1957, along with unusual "twin-fin" trim on top of both front fenders.

The price was reduced and the power was increased by way of AMC's new 327 cu in (5.4 L) V8 that was rated at 255 hp (190 kW) with a four-barrel carburetor and dual exhausts.

Prompted by Automobile Manufacturer Association ban on factory-supported racing beginning in 1957, production of Hudson Hornet ended on 25 June 1957, at which time the Hudson brand name with its racing heritage was discontinued and all American Motors Corporation automobiles were then marketed as being made by "Rambler" Division. Total production of 1957 Hornets was 4,108, split between 3,359 sedans and 749 Hollywood Hardtops.

== Foreign markets ==
The Hudson Hornet was sold in foreign markets, either exported as complete cars or locally built from knock-down kits.

=== Australia ===
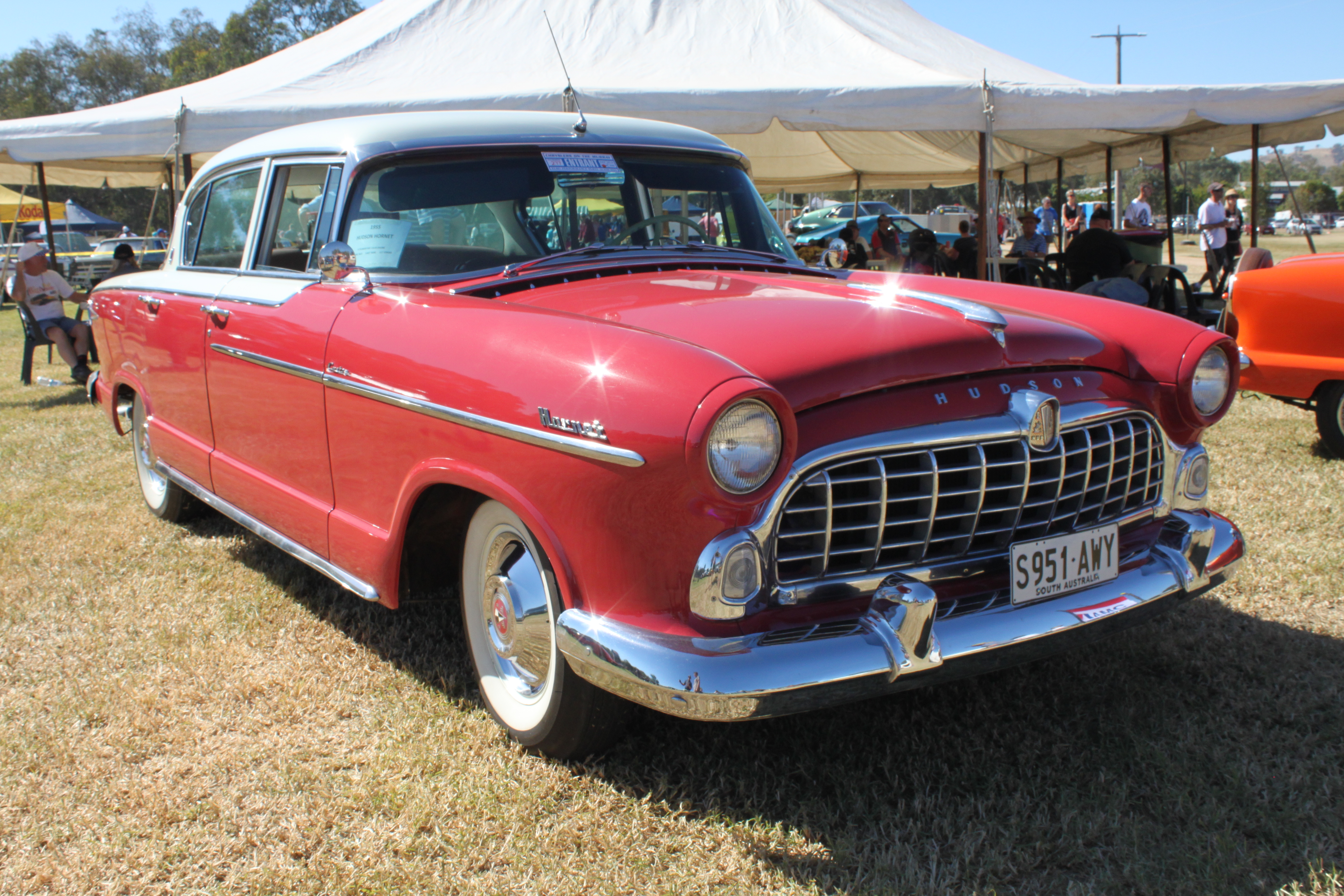
1955 Hudson Hornet (Australia)

The Hornet was introduced to the Australian market in 1955.

=== Canada ===
Canadian assembly of Hudson vehicles commenced in 1932 by Hudson Motors of Canada in Tilbury, Ontario. World War II interrupted operations and production ceased in 1941. Post-war operations resumed in 1950, with Hudsons being assembled by CHATCO Steel Products in Tilbury, Ontario. Operations in Tilbury ceased permanently in 1954 following the formation of American Motors Corporation. As a result of the merger, Toronto-based Nash Motors of Canada Ltd. became American Motors (Canada) Ltd. and all subsequent Hudson, Nash, and Rambler assembly operations continued in Toronto.

=== New Zealand ===
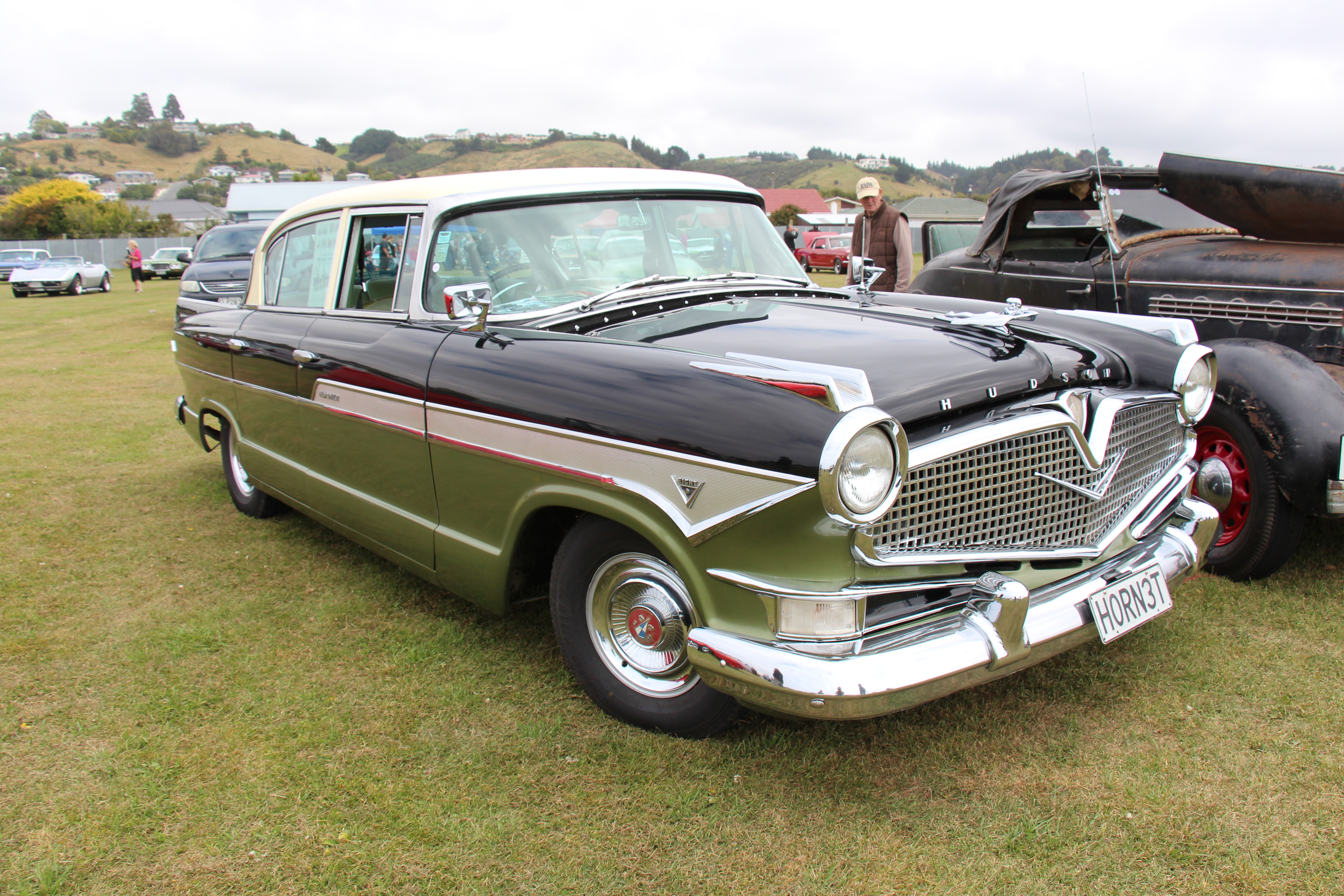
1957 Hudson Hornet assembled in New Zealand

Hudson vehicles were imported into New Zealand from 1912 and eventually locally assembled from knock-down kits from 1919.

From 1935, Hudson and other marques were assembled by Christchurch company Motor Assemblies Limited. Production ended when Standard-Triumph International acquired the company in 1954. From 1954 the Hudson Hornet was built in New Zealand by Auckland company VW Motors as a secondary line to the Volkswagens they assembled. AMC's subsequent Rambler models were assembled thereafter at VW Motors' new plant in Otahuhu, Auckland from 1958 until 1962. AMC formed an agreement in 1963 with Campbell Motor Industries (CMI) of Thames to assemble Ramblers, production of which ran from 1964 until 1971.

=== South Africa ===
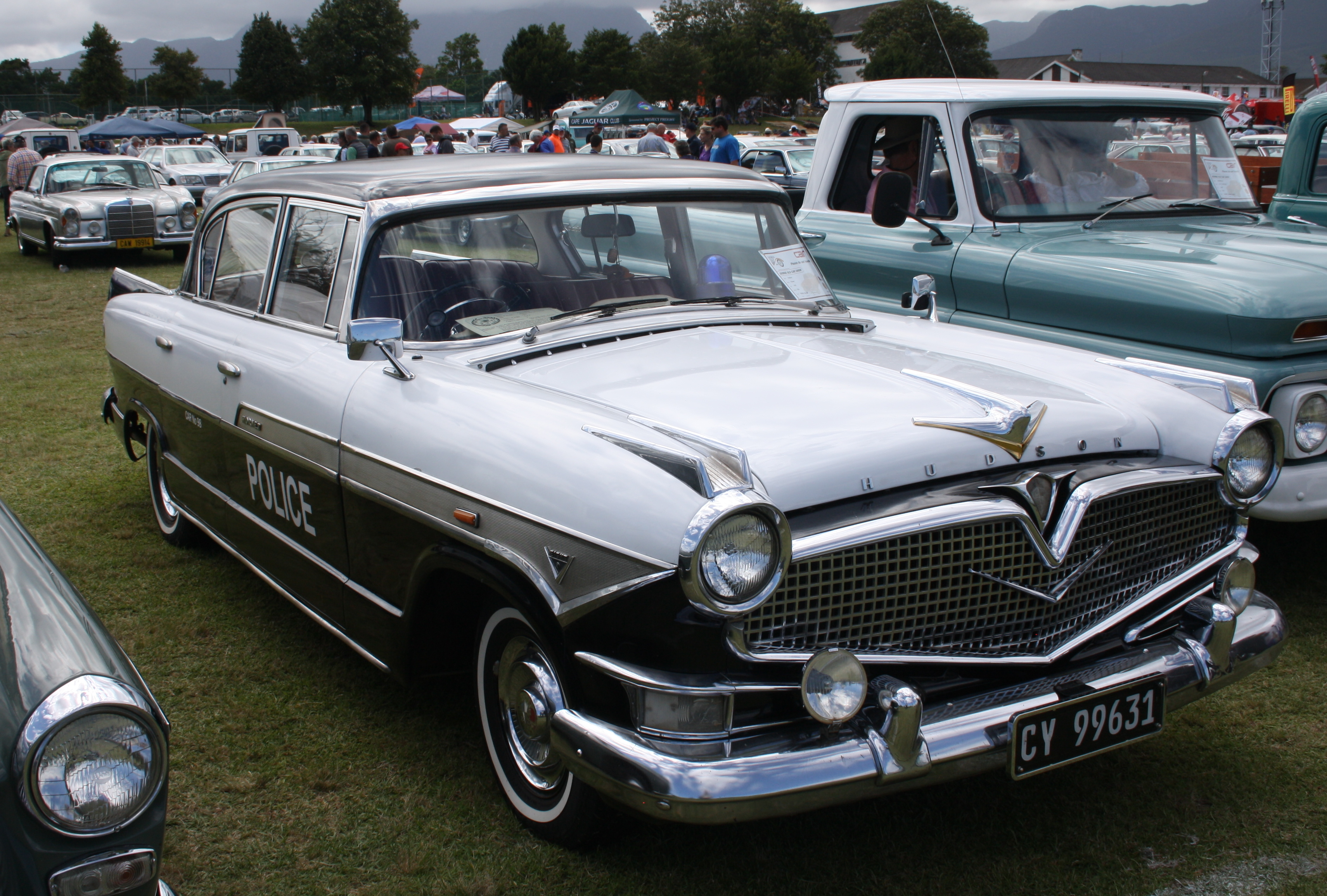
1957 Hudson Hornet (South Africa)

Hudson vehicles were assembled in South Africa beginning in the 1920s by Stanley Motors at their plant, National Motor Assemblers (NMA), in Natalspruit (Gauteng). The Hudson Hornet was assembled in right-hand-drive from knock-down kits sourced from Canada. After the Hudson and Nash merger, NMA continued to assemble AMC's new Ramblers until 1967, although the 1957 Rambler was instead marketed in South Africa as the "Hudson 108."

=== United Kingdom & Europe ===
Hudsons were introduced to the United Kingdom in 1911 and eventually, a factory was built where Hudson (and Essex) vehicles were locally assembled from 1927. The British company was renamed Hudson Motors Ltd. in 1932.

The Hudson Hornet was assembled in right-hand-drive for the U.K., Irish market and other European countries. Following the demise of the Hudson marque, the British company was renamed Rambler Motors (A.M.C.) Limited in 1966 and continued to import AMC vehicles through the 1970s.

== Legacy ==
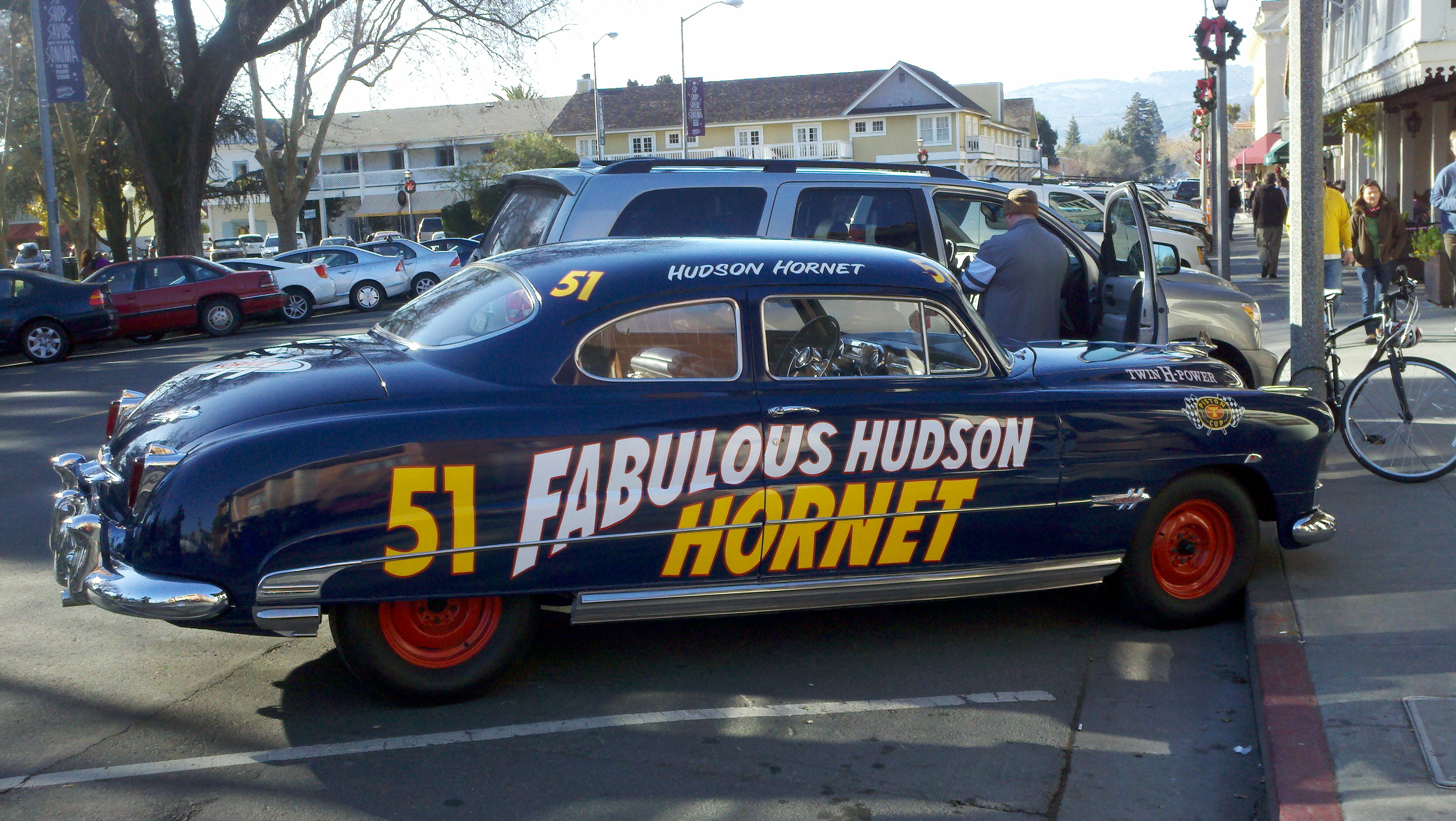
Hudson Hornet 51 created as a prototype for the film Cars

The 1951 Hudson Hornet was selected as the "Car of the Year" in a book profiling seventy-five years of noteworthy automobiles by automotive journalist Henry Bolles Lent.

The Disney/Pixar film Cars and several spin-off video games featured a 1951 Hornet named Doc Hudson, a retired Piston Cup champion who raced as the "Fabulous Hudson Hornet". He was voiced by Paul Newman, who was an avid auto-racing enthusiast. The Piston Cup is the Cars franchise's version of the Winston Cup Series, which changed names several times since its inception.

Konami subsidiary Hudson Soft's mascot, Hachisuke, is a hornet in reference to the Hudson Hornet.

== Revivals of the Hornet model name ==
For the 1970 model year, American Motors resurrected the Hornet name for their new compact car that replaced the Rambler American (see AMC Hornet).

In 2006, a small, front-wheel-drive concept car called Hornet was designed and developed by Dodge.

For the 2023 model year, Stellantis resurrected the Hornet name for their new SUV, a version of the Alfa Romeo Tonale marketed in the U.S. under the Dodge brand.

== Notable owners ==
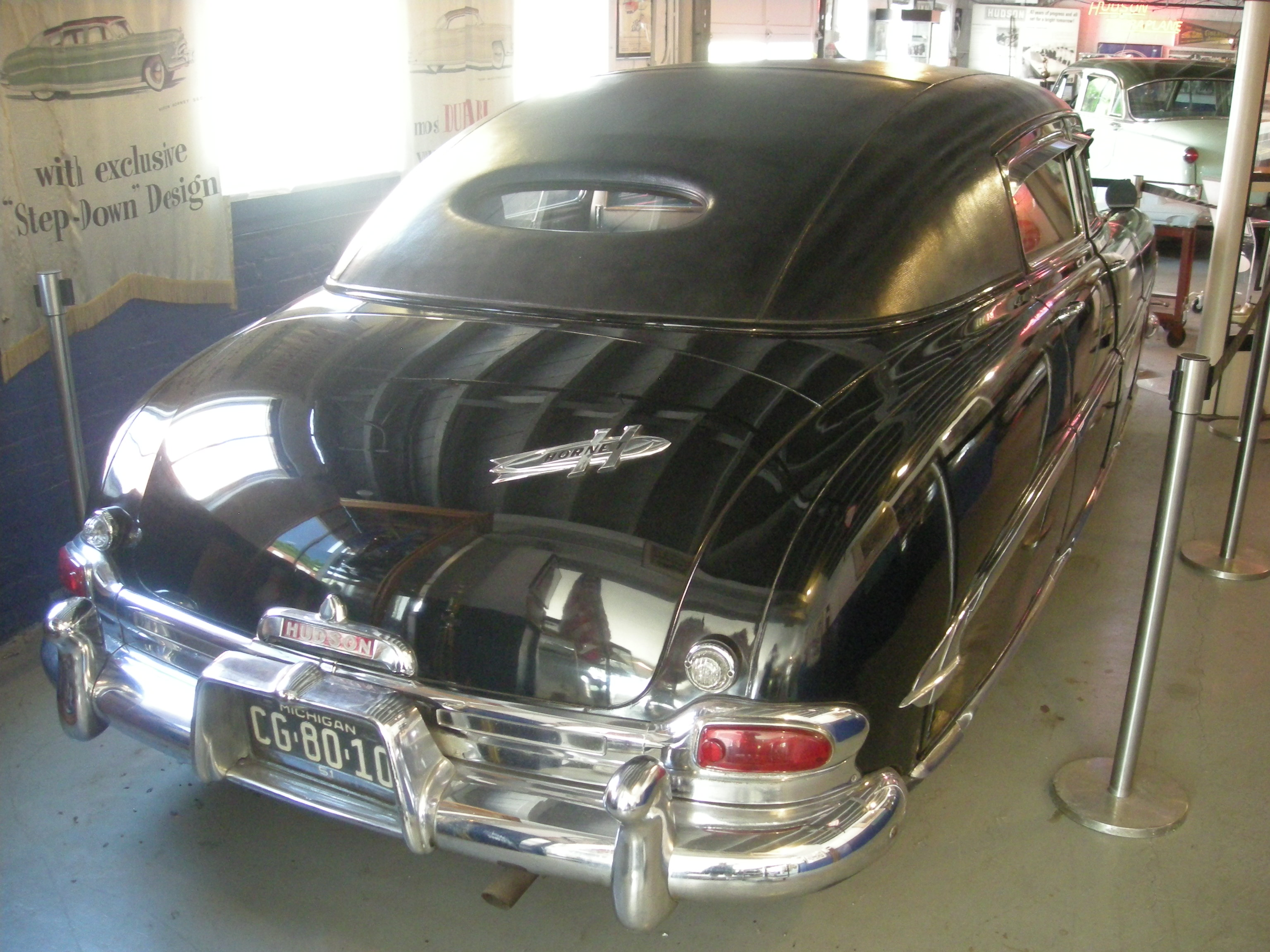
1951 Hudson Hornet Limousine

- Steve McQueen — 1953 Twin-H powered sedan finished in green color combination
- A. E. Barit — 1951 Hornet converted by Derham into a limousine with updates in both 1952 and 1953 to make it look like then-current models.

== Collectability ==
First-generation Hudson Hornets are legendary for their NASCAR racing history. Comedian and auto enthusiast Jay Leno lists the 1951–1954 models as one of the "top ten of America's most collectible cars". "One of the great postwar landmarks - a true champion" gives it a big edge in collector appeal. Richard M. Langworth describes the first-generation Hornets in his book Complete Book of Collectible Cars: 70 Years of Blue Chip Auto Investments as "the most remembered Hudson of the postwar years, one of the industry's all-time greats." For example, prices on the Club Coupes, the body style used by the winning NASCAR drivers, have greatly appreciated in the last several years where several nicely restored examples have broken the $75K barrier in several cases. The convertible versions have also increased in value with a restored 1953 bringing $150,000 in 2013.

== See also ==
- Fabulous Hudson Hornet, stock car version of Hornet.
- Mercury Eight (1949–1951), a very similarly styled car
- Hudson Wasp (1952–1956), a lower-priced version of the step-down Hornet.
- Doc Hudson, a Cars character based on the car of the same name.

== Notes ==
Inline

General

- Conde, John A. (1987). The American Motors Family Album. American Motors Corporation. OCLC 3185581.
