= Ford Thunderbird (second generation) =

Car model

Ford Thunderbird Second Generation
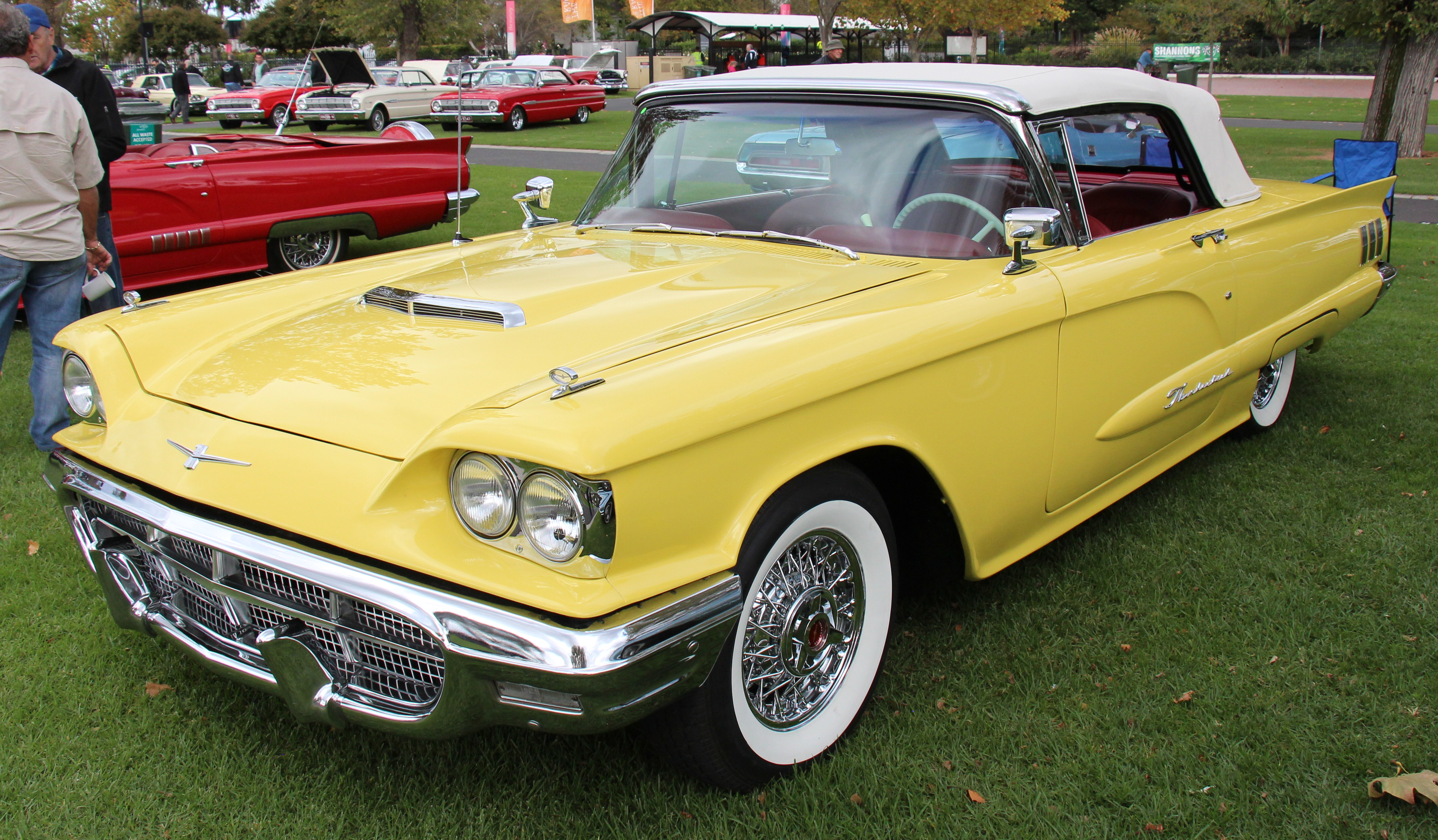
- 1960 Ford Thunderbird Convertible

Overview
- Manufacturer: Ford Motor Company
- Also called: Square Bird
- Production: December 1957–1960
- Model years: 1958–1960
- Assembly: United States: Wixom Assembly Plant, Wixom, Michigan
- Designer: Joe Oros

Body and chassis
- Class: Personal luxury car
- Body style: 2-door hardtop coupe; 2-door convertible
- Layout: Front-engine, rear-wheel-drive
- Chassis: unibody

Powertrain
- Engine: 352 cu in (5.8 L) FE V8; 430 cu in (7.0 L) MEL V8
- Transmission: 3-speed manual; 3-speed Cruise-o-Matic automatic

Dimensions
- Wheelbase: 112 in (2,845 mm)
- Length: 205.4 in (5,217 mm)
- Width: 77 in (1,956 mm)
- Curb weight: 3,957 lb (1,795 kg)

Chronology
- Predecessor: Ford Thunderbird (first generation)
- Successor: Ford Thunderbird (third generation)

The second generation Ford Thunderbird (also called Square Bird) was produced by Ford for the 1958 to 1960 model years as a successor to the popular 1955–1957 two-seater. In response to Ford-conducted surveys two major changes were made to attract potential buyers: two rear seats were added and the level of luxury and features of a full-sized car were incorporated into a mid-size platform.

As a result, sales soared and the new model dramatically expanded the personal luxury car market, winning the Motor Trend Car of the Year in 1958. Sales totalled 198,191 over three model years, approximately four times that of the earlier two seat model.

Along with the 1958 Lincolns, the 1958 Thunderbird was the first Ford Motor Company vehicle designed with unibody construction.

== Design ==
Although the 1955–1957 Ford Thunderbird had proved successful (in comparison to the Chevrolet Corvette), Ford executives—particularly Robert McNamara—still felt its overall sales volume had room to improve. Market research suggested sales of the Thunderbird were limited by its two-seat configuration, making it unsuitable for families. The Studebaker Speedster and the Chrysler 300C shared many appearances with the Thunderbird, while offering a rear seat. As a response, Ford executives decided to add a rear seat to the Thunderbird. The listed retail price was US$3,408 for the base price ($39,067 in 2025 dollars). Mercury also saw the introduction of a flagship hardtop coupe with a similar approach to luxury called the Mercury Turnpike Cruiser with a longer wheelbase and two inches more for width dimensions, then updated to the 1958 Mercury Park Lane.

The new Thunderbird had a distinct new styling theme. The styling department drove the design entirely and approved it before the engineering was considered. The design was one of two proposals, styled primarily by Joe Oros, who later worked on the 1964 Ford Mustang. However, the losing proposal, styled by Elwood Engel, would gain its own place in Ford Motor Company history: after minor revisions, it would become the 1961 Lincoln Continental.

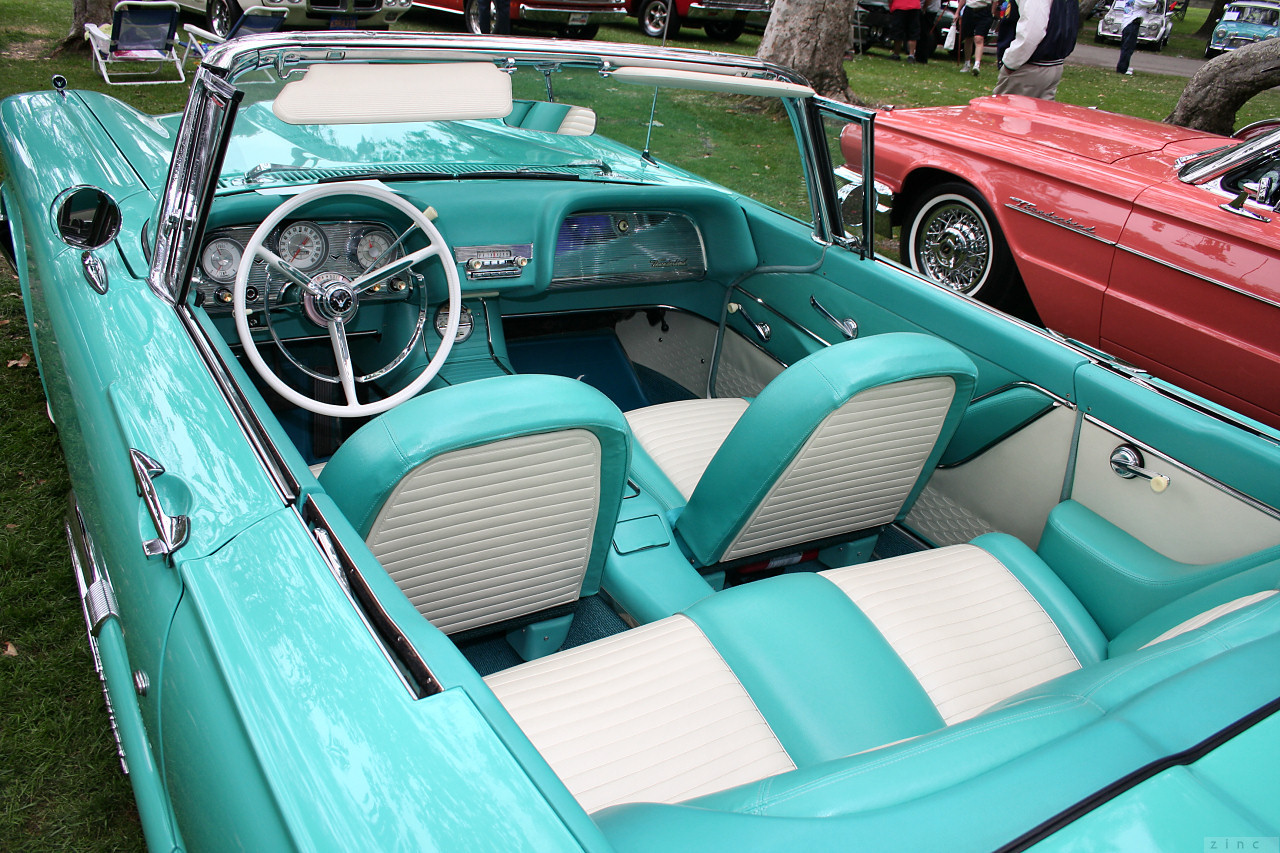
Interior (1959 model)

The four-seat Thunderbird was designed with unibody construction, eschewing a separate chassis shared with the all-new Lincoln built at the all new factory in Wixom, Michigan. The intent was to allow the maximum interior space in a relatively small exterior package. The 1958 Thunderbird was only 52.5 inches tall, nearly 9 inches shorter than an average American sedan; the Thunderbird had only 5.8 inches of ground clearance. Ford incorporated the higher drivetrain tunnel that was required in a lower car into a center console dividing both front and rear seats which featured ashtrays, switches, and minor controls.

The remainder of the engineering was conventional, with Ford's new 300-hp 352 cu in (5.8 L) FE-series V8 coupled to a three-speed manual transmission, with overdrive or Cruise-O-Matic three-speed automatic transmission optional, and all were steering column installed gear selection. Front suspension was independent, with coil springs and unequal-length A-arms. The rear was initially a live axle suspended by trailing arms and coil springs, which were intended to be interchangeable with optional air springs that were canceled before production. This was changed to a more conventional leaf spring suspension in the 1959 model year. Drum brakes were used on all four wheels.

== 1958 ==
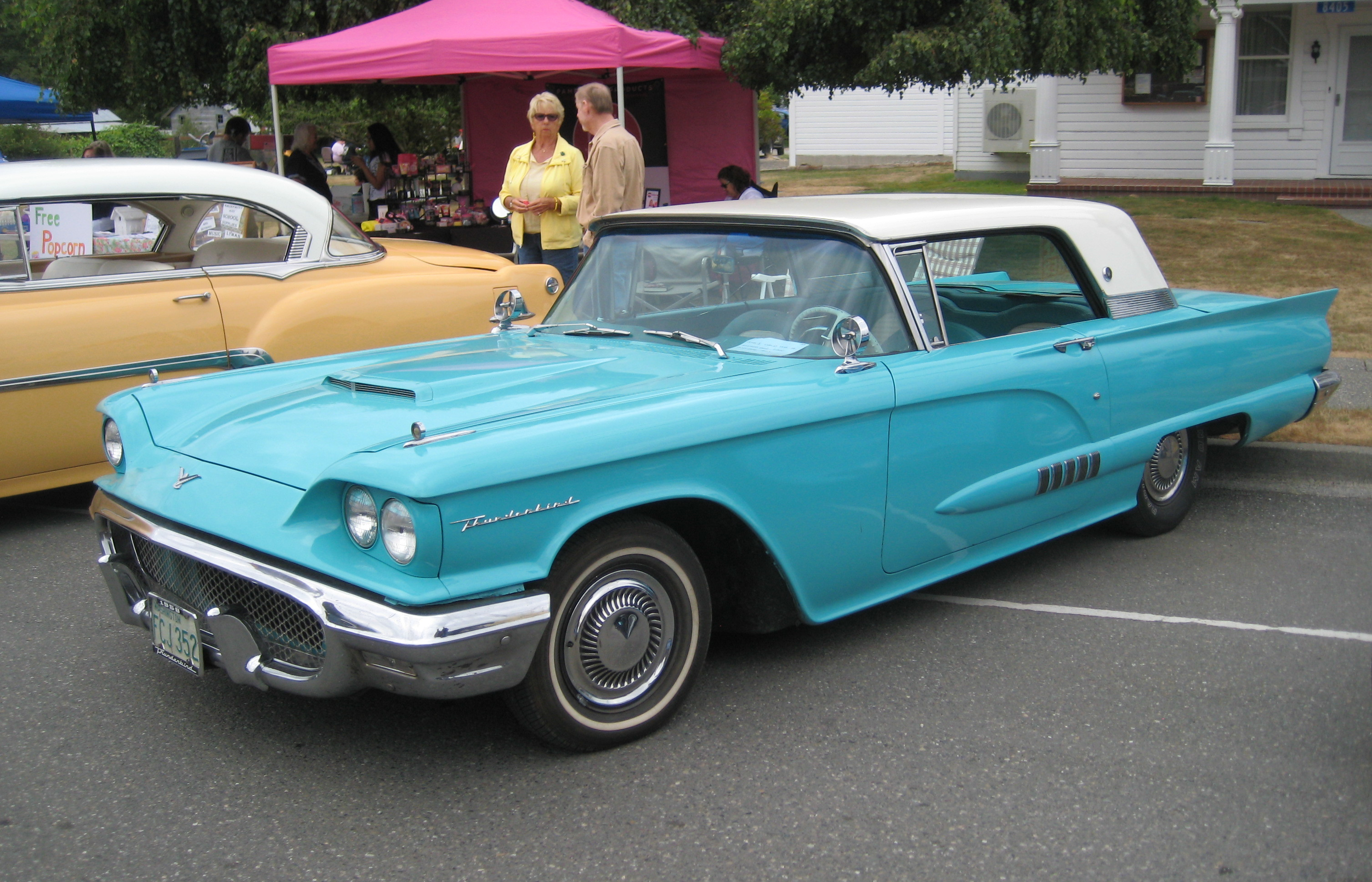
1958 Ford Thunderbird

Various delays conspired to have production start only on December 20, 1957, much later than the normal start expected in September; the 1957 Thunderbird was thus built for three extra months.

The new Thunderbird captured Motor Trend's Car of the Year award in its debut season, making history as the first individual model line (as opposed to an entire company) to do so. While many fans of the earlier, two-seat Thunderbirds were not happy with the new direction, Ford was vindicated with sales figures of 37,892 units, more than double the previous year despite losing three months of production and 1958 being a very poor year for car sales.

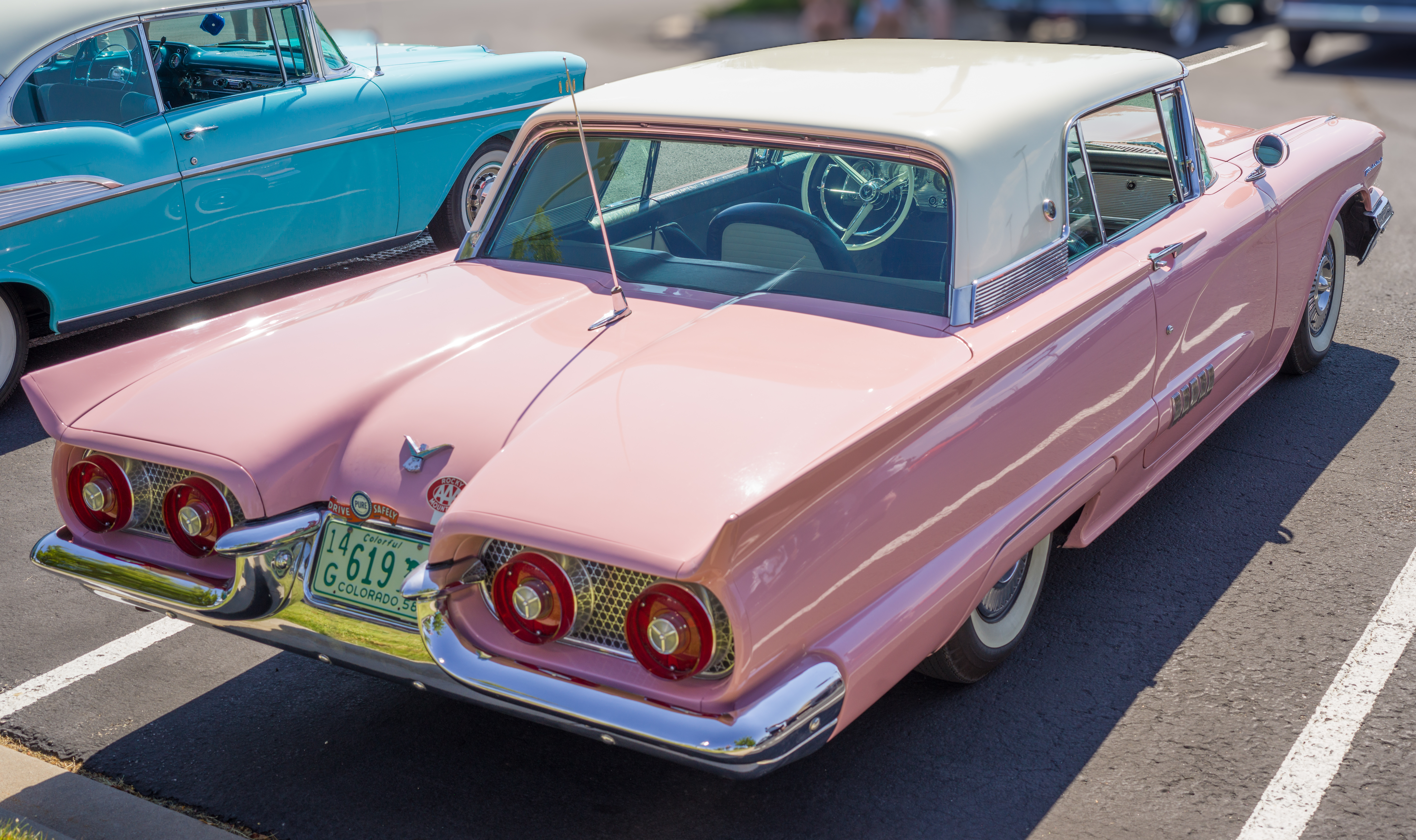
1958 Ford Thunderbird in Cameo Rose and Winterset White Two-Tone

The car officially went on sale in late January 1958. By mid-March, Ford “announced that it is producing its new four-passenger Thunderbird on a heavy overtime schedule and assembling every possible car in an effort to meet demand [with] a backlog of 5,000 advance orders already on record”....hoping to produce “about twice as many Thunderbirds in April” as it had in February.

The Thunderbird was one of only two cars to show a sales increase that year (the other being the Rambler). The convertible did not go on sale until June 1958, resulting in only 2,134 being built.

== 1959 ==
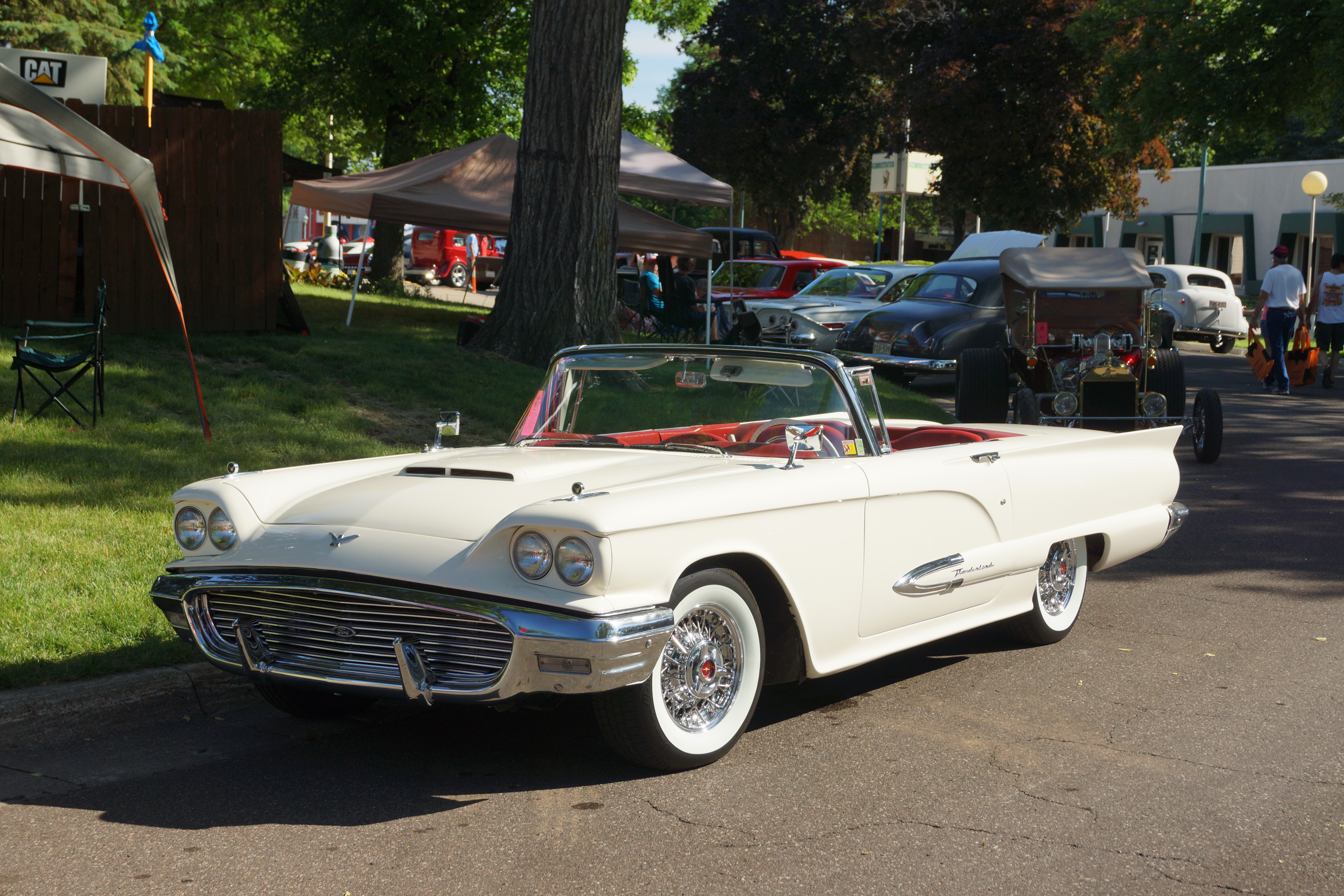
1959 Ford Thunderbird convertible

For the 1959 model year, Ford made changes to the front, rear, and side ornamentation; leather upholstery was available for the first time. The rear suspension was revised, discarding coil springs for Hotchkiss drive with parallel leaf springs. A new V8 engine, the 345-hp 430 cu in (7.0 L) MEL-series, was available in small numbers. Sales almost doubled again, to 67,456 units, including 10,261 convertibles. Thunderbird advertising in 1959 targeted women in particular, showing glamorous models in country club and other exclusive settings, and the sales figures bore out Ford's marketing plans.

== 1960 ==
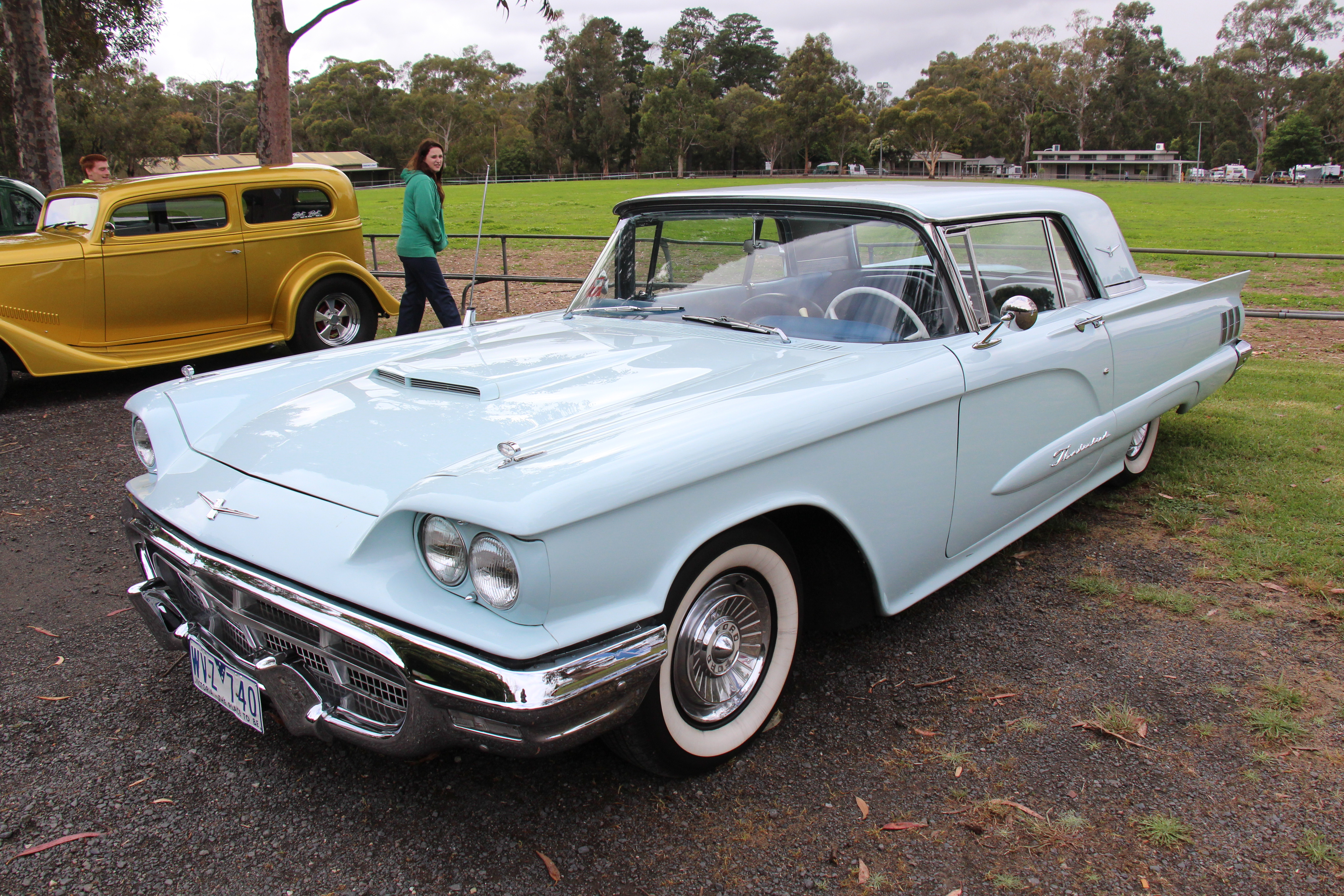
1960 Ford Thunderbird hardtop

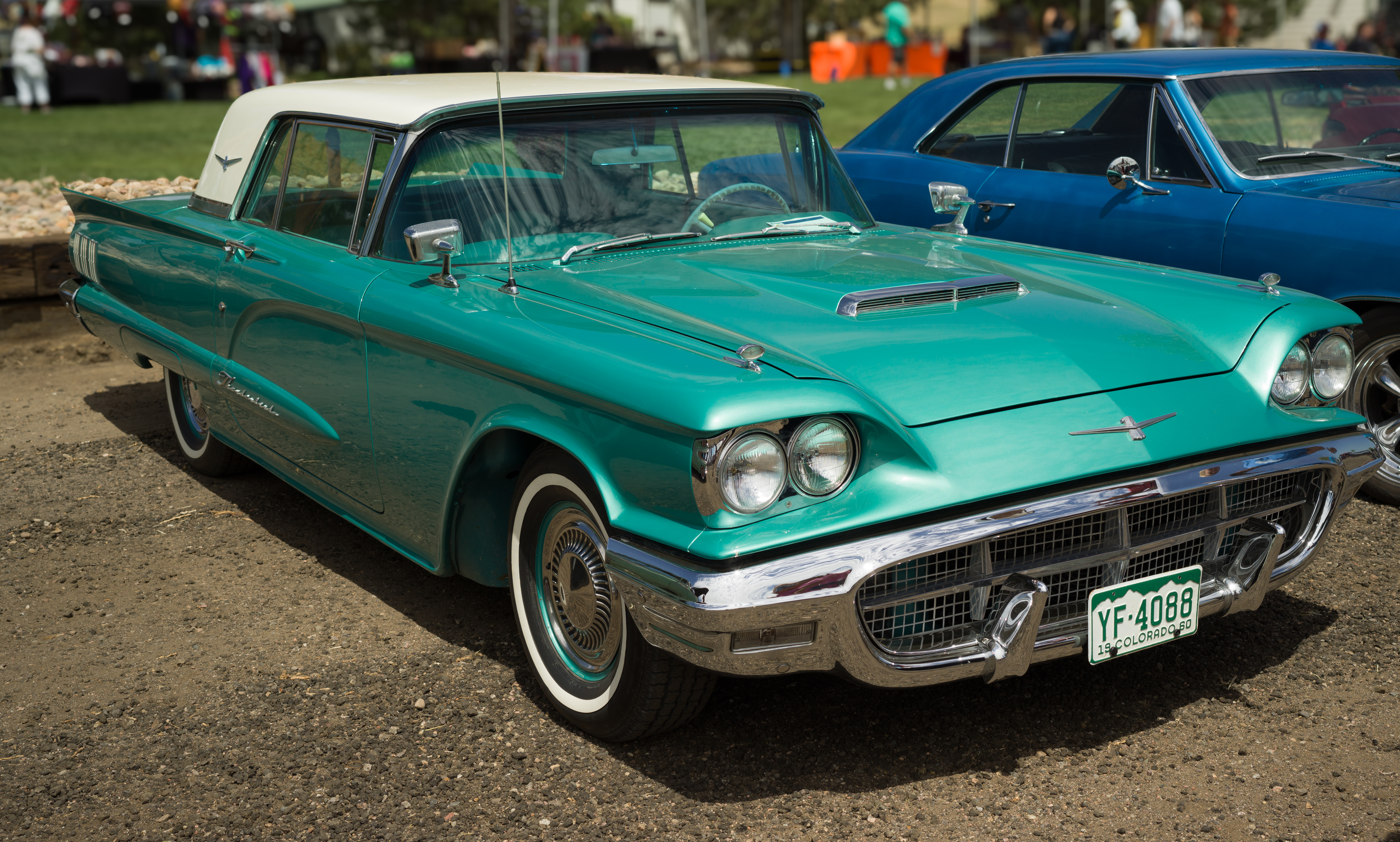
1960 Ford Thunderbird in Sultana Turquoise

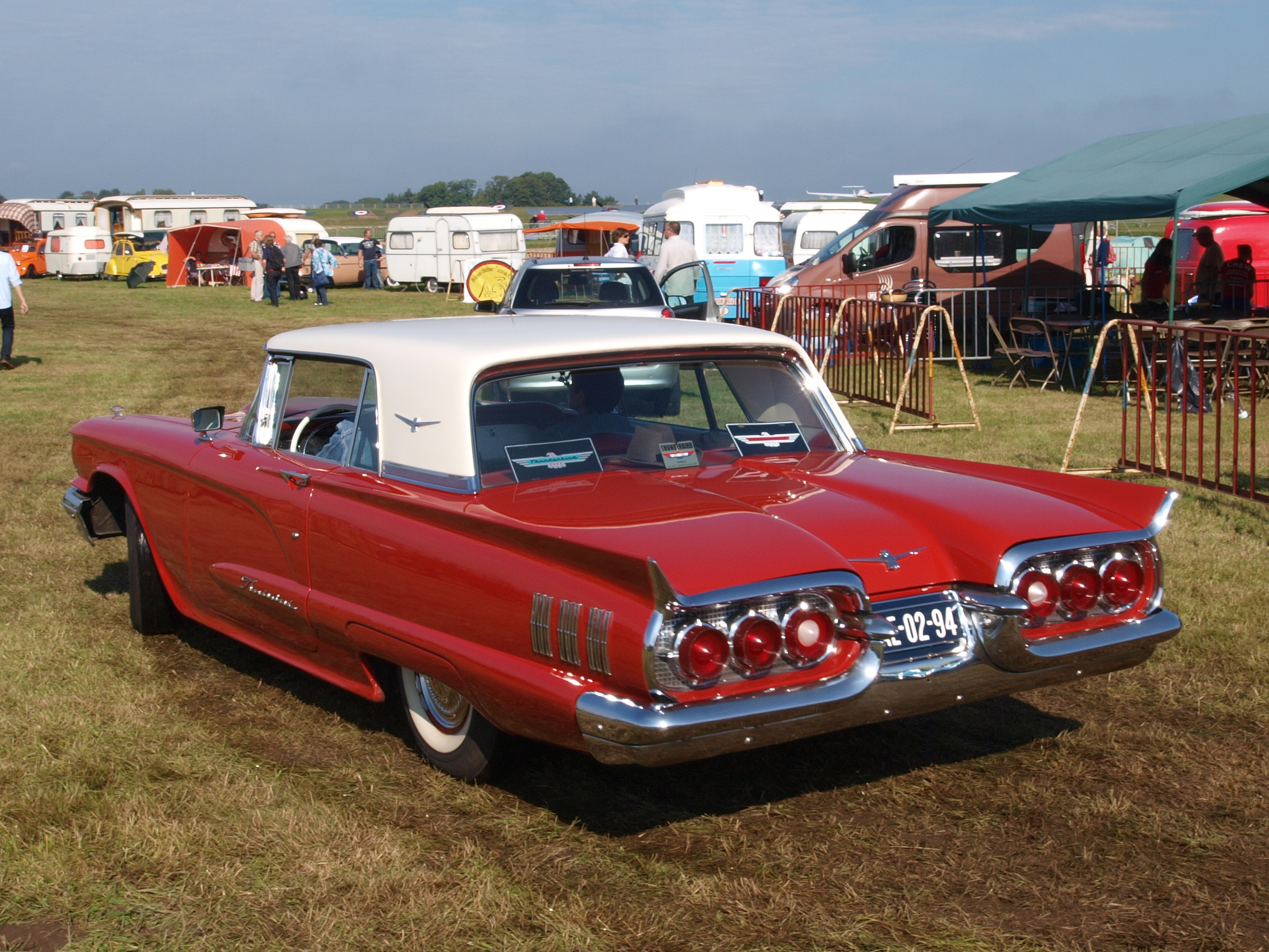
Rear view showing the six tail lights added for the 1960 model year

With more trim changes, most notably the addition of a third tail light in the rear clusters, 1960's sales figures hit another record: 92,843 units sold, including 11,860 convertibles. A rare option in this year was a sunroof; this "Golde Edition" (Golde was a German company whose sunroof patent Ford licensed) sold 2,530 examples.

At the end of 1960, two Thunderbirds were constructed of stainless steel for the Allegheny Ludlum Steel Corporation to showcase the decorative use of stainless steel, at a price of US$35,000 each ($380,906 in 2025 dollars). Because of the properties of stainless steel, the production dies would be destroyed as a result of the stamping of the parts. This was not a problem for Ford, as the next generation of T-Bird used a new body style. To duplicate the T-Birds 3,957 lb (1,795 kg) normal production weight, body panels were made of Type 302 stainless steel, and trim pieces out of Type 430 stainless steel. At the time of their production, because of the maximum rolling mill for stainless steel only produced stock that was 72 inches (1,800 mm) in width, both cars' roofs were constructed from two 42-inch-wide sections welded together in the middle. Both T-Birds received mechanical and interior restorations in the 1980s and survive to this day, with one on permanent display at the Heinz History Center in Pittsburgh, Pennsylvania.

== Production totals ==
The new Thunderbirds were produced at a new assembly plant at Wixom, Michigan, built as part of a corporate expansion plan to increase the sales of up-market cars (Mercurys, Lincolns, and Thunderbirds). A second location was opened in Pico Rivera, California at another new location called Los Angeles Assembly.

Year	Production
1958	37,892
1959	67,456
1960	92,843
Total	198,191
