= George W. Walker =

American industrial designer

George W. Walker (May 22, 1896 – January 19, 1993) was an American industrial and automotive designer. His most notable work was the original Ford Thunderbird.

== Early life ==
Walker was born in Chicago, Illinois. His father worked for the Erie Railroad and the family moved several times, settling in Cleveland, Ohio, when Walker was in his teens. He played semi-professional football and held down odd jobs, but his interest in art led to art school in Los Angeles.

== Career ==
He began his professional career as an illustrator for department store advertising, initially as a student in Los Angeles and then as an independent in Cleveland.

He broke into the auto business doing illustration work for the failing Peerless automobile company in the late 1920s. He went on to a brief stint working for Harley Earl and John Tjaarda at General Motors, then to Graham-Paige. In 1929 the stock market crash spelled the end for many companies, including Graham-Paige, and Walker went looking for work. He found it with a hardware supplier, Dura. This company supplied several automakers with parts.

This job led to contact with József Galamb, the primary designer for Ford Motor Company. Walker's firm did substantial design work for Ford parts, then in the late 1940s began styling work for some Ford cars. In the early 1950s he joined Ford at the behest of Ford executive Ernie Breech, bringing colleagues Elwood Engel and Joe Oros (later a primary designer on the Mustang). Walker became corporate vice-president of Ford Motor Company for design in 1955. He stepped down from all his positions at Ford in 1961 after reaching the company's mandatory retirement age of 65.

Walker appeared on the November 4, 1957, cover of Time. On October 15, 1959, he appeared as a guest challenger on the TV panel show To Tell the Truth.

Walker's career also included industrial design for clocks, bread boxes, chemistry sets, bicycles, and roller skates, among other products.

== Personal life ==
He moved to Gulf Stream, Florida, where he became mayor in 1976. He died on January 19, 1993, in Tucson, Arizona, at the age of 96.
