= L. David Ash =

American automobile designer

L. David Ash was an American automotive stylist who worked variously in the Lincoln, Continental, Edsel and Ford studios at Ford Motor Company. He is known for his contributions to the styling of the Ford Mustang, Ford Thunderbird and Continental Mark III — and his innovative work on the Plexiglas skylights of the 1954 Ford Victoria Skyliner and Mercury Monterey Sun Valley — forerunners of today's moonroof. Ash, who ultimately received the title of Chief Stylist at Ford, died July 2, 1991.

At Ford, Ash worked with other interior and exterior Ford stylists and executives, including Joe Oros, John Najjar, Eugene Bordinat, John J. Nance, Bob Thomas, John Reinhart, Roy Brown, Ken Spencer, Larry Doyle, Dick Krafe, Bob MacGuire, Virginia VanBrunt, Helen Vincent — as well as designers outside Ford including George Barris and Gene Winfield. With Ford of Germany, he worked on the Ford Taunus project. Ash also worked on the styling of the Presidential Parade car — the vehicle in which U.S. President John F. Kennedy was assassinated.

== Mustang ==
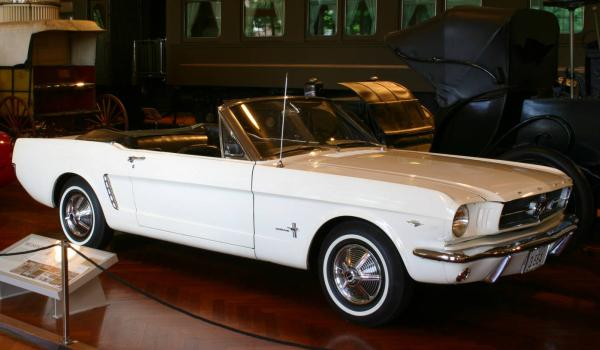
1964/65 Mustang

As Lee Iacocca's assistant general manager and chief engineer, Donald N. Frey, was the head engineer for the Mustang project — supervising the development of the Mustang in a record 18 months — while Iacocca himself championed the project as Ford Division general manager. The Mustang prototype was a two-seat, mid-mounted engine roadster, later remodeled as a four-seat car styled under the direction of Project Design Chief Joe Oros and his team of L. David Ash, Gale Halderman, and John Foster — in Ford's Lincoln–Mercury Division design studios, which produced the winning design in an intramural design contest instigated by Iacocca. Ash's styling exercise, originally internally named the Cougar, was the winning styling exercise.

The design team had been given five goals for the design of the Mustang: it would seat four, it would have bucket seats and a floor mounted shifter, it would weigh no more than 2500 pounds and be no more than 180 inches in length, it would sell for less than $2500, and it should have multiple power, comfort and luxury options for the buyer to select from.

Ash, in a 1985 interview — with David R.Crippen, Curator of special Collections, Archives & Record Center at the Henry Ford Museum — speaking of the origin of the Mustang design, when asked the degree of his contribution, said:

I would say substantial. However, anyone that says they designed the car by themselves, is wrong. Iacocca didn't design it. He conceived it. He's called the father of it, and, in that respect, he was. I did not design it in total, nor did Oros. It was designed by a design group. You look at the photograph taken at the award banquet for the Industrial Designers’ Society where the Mustang received the medal; it’s got Damon Woods in it (the group that did the interior), and Charlie Phaneuf (who was with Damon), and it’s got myself and John Foster (who was with me), it’s got (John) Najjar in it.

So nobody actually did the car, as such. Iacocca in his book flat out comes and says I did the car. It's right there in print, "It's Dave Ash's Mustang." Bordinat will tell you I did the car. This book tells you I did the car, but, in actual fact, I had a lot of help, and I don't think anyone ever does a car by himself, not in these times anyway.

Joe Oros, speaking about the design of the Mustang:

I guided the overall appearance, especially the front end, but Dave Ash, Gale Halderman, and John Foster did an outstanding job in guiding the Mustang's development with the various committees that came through the studio -- manufacturing, engineering, product planning. Charlie Phaneuf, another manager with a lot of ideas, also helped tremendously, as did the interior studio headed by Damon Woods. It was a tremendous all-around effort that shows what teamwork can do when properly coordinated.

== Continental Mark III ==
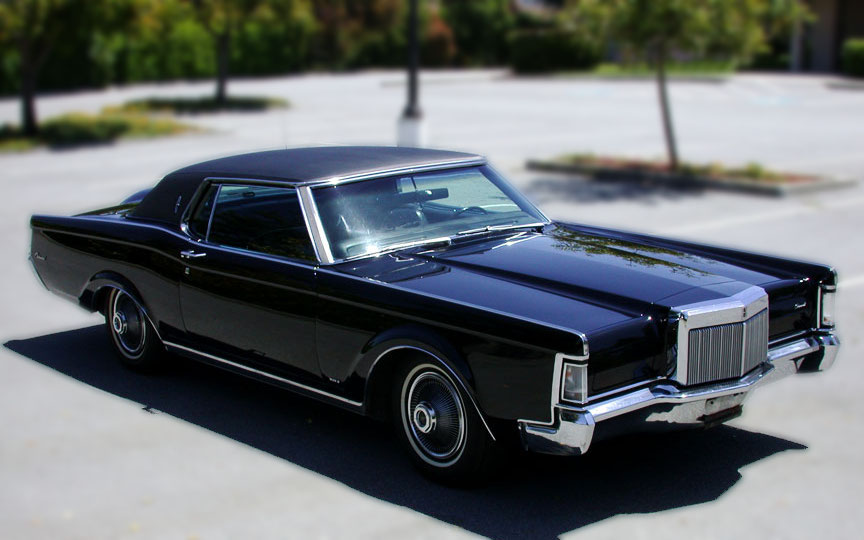
Lincoln Continental Mark III

As Chief Stylist at Ford, Ash contributed to the styling of the Mark III, which had derived heavily from the mid-sixties Ford Thunderbird. Ash distinctively raised the height of the rear fenders and upper back panel (two inches higher than the Thunderbird), thereby giving Mark III a hunched look that recalled cars of the 1920s. When Henry Ford II saw the result, said "I want to drive that one home."

In a break from company tradition, the newly promoted Ash, was given a Mark III to use as his company vehicle, in acknowledgment of his contribution to its design.

== See also ==
- Ford Mustang
