= Betty Thatcher Oros =

American female industrial designer

- Born: Elizabeth ("Betty") Anna Thatcher; April 18, 1917; Elyria, Ohio, United States
- Died: August 19, 2001 (aged 84)
- Education: Cleveland School of Arts
- Occupation: Automotive designer
- Years active: 1939-1941
- Employer: Hudson Motor Company

Betty Thatcher Oros (born Elizabeth Anna Thatcher, April 18, 1917, Elyria, Ohio – August 19, 2001) was an American automobile designer.

== Education ==
Betty Thatcher Oros graduated from Elyria High School in 1935. She attended the Cleveland School of Arts, now the Cleveland Institute of Art. She majored in Industrial Design, graduating in 1939 with honors.

== Work at Hudson ==
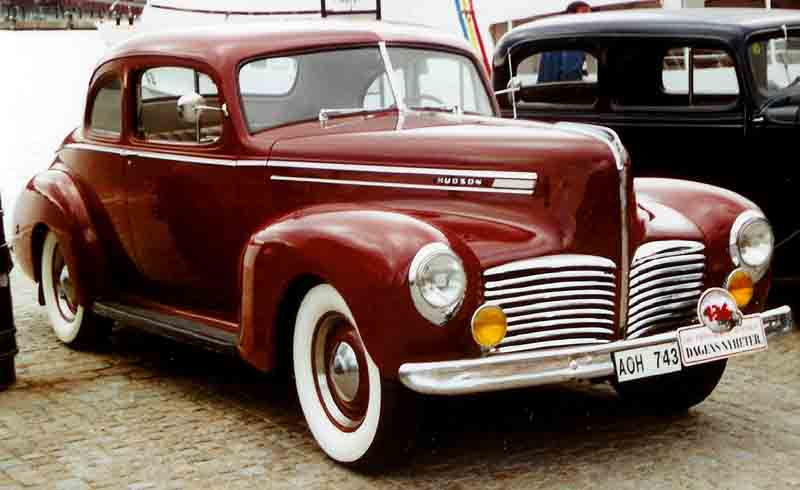
1941 Hudson

Hudson Motor Company was among the first automotive companies to employ women designers full-time. They wanted a woman to contribute a female point of view to automotive design, hired Oros as the first female American automotive designer. in 1939. Hudson's decision to hire the 22-year old Betty Thatcher for its styling department changed the automotive industry.

Her contributions were not limited to the interior, Oros worked on some of the exterior trim for the 1939 Hudson Big Boy truck (Series 98) based on the Hudson Commodore sedan. It improved the appeal of the vehicle.

The "Big Boy" designation was dropped, but her initial designs continued for the post-World War II, horizontally split grille, 1946 and 1947 (Series 58) versions.

Her contributions to the 1941 Hudson cars included exterior trim with side lighting, interior instrument panel, interiors, and interior trim fabrics.

== Resignation ==
Oros designed for Hudson Motors from 1939 into 1941, when she and Joe Oros were married. Because Joe Oros worked in the Cadillac Studio at General Motors, Betty resigned from Hudson to avoid a conflict of interest. However, she continued to produce art.

The Oroses had five children: Joe III, Christina, Janet, Mary, and John. She later served as a board member of the Santa Barbara Museum of Art and the Santa Barbara Symphony Orchestra. Betty Thatcher Oros died on August 19, 2001.
