= Hudson Commodore =

Full-size car produced by Hudson (1941–1942 and 1946–1952)

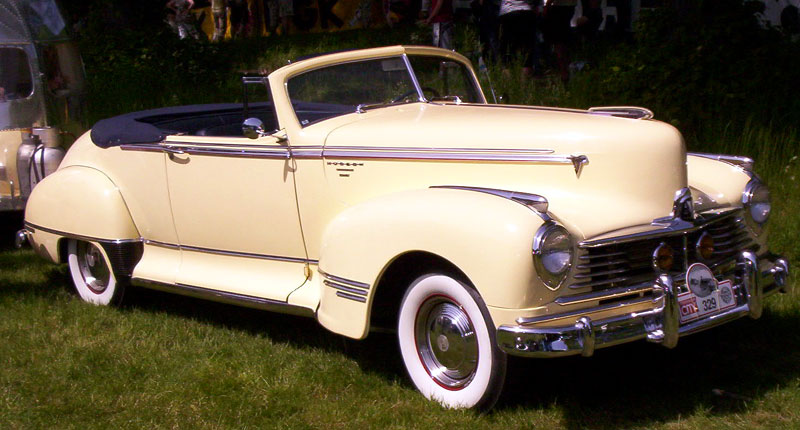
- 1947 Hudson Commodore Convertible Brougham

Overview
- Manufacturer: Hudson Motor Car Company
- Production: 1941–1942; 1946–1952
- Assembly: Detroit, Michigan, United States

Body and chassis
- Class: Full-size
- Layout: FR layout

Chronology
- Predecessor: Hudson Greater Eight

The Hudson Commodore is an automobile produced by the Hudson Motor Car Company of Detroit, Michigan, commonly described across three generations. All were equipped with a straight-6 or a straight-8 engine and featured Hudson's "Fluid-Cushioned Clutch," a wet-multi-plate system housed in a sealed bell housing.

Launched in 1941 as a spiritual successor to the Hudson Greater 8, the Commodore was positioned as the largest and most luxurious Hudson model. Production ceased in 1942 to build materials needed for World War II. Civilian assembly began in 1946, with the second generation Commodore offering more standard features than the competition. The third generation Commodore was introduced for the 1948 model year. This was one of the first brand-new designs of the post-war era and featured the revolutionary unibody "step-down" design combining a low center of gravity, superior handling, and distinctive styling.

== First generation ==
First generation
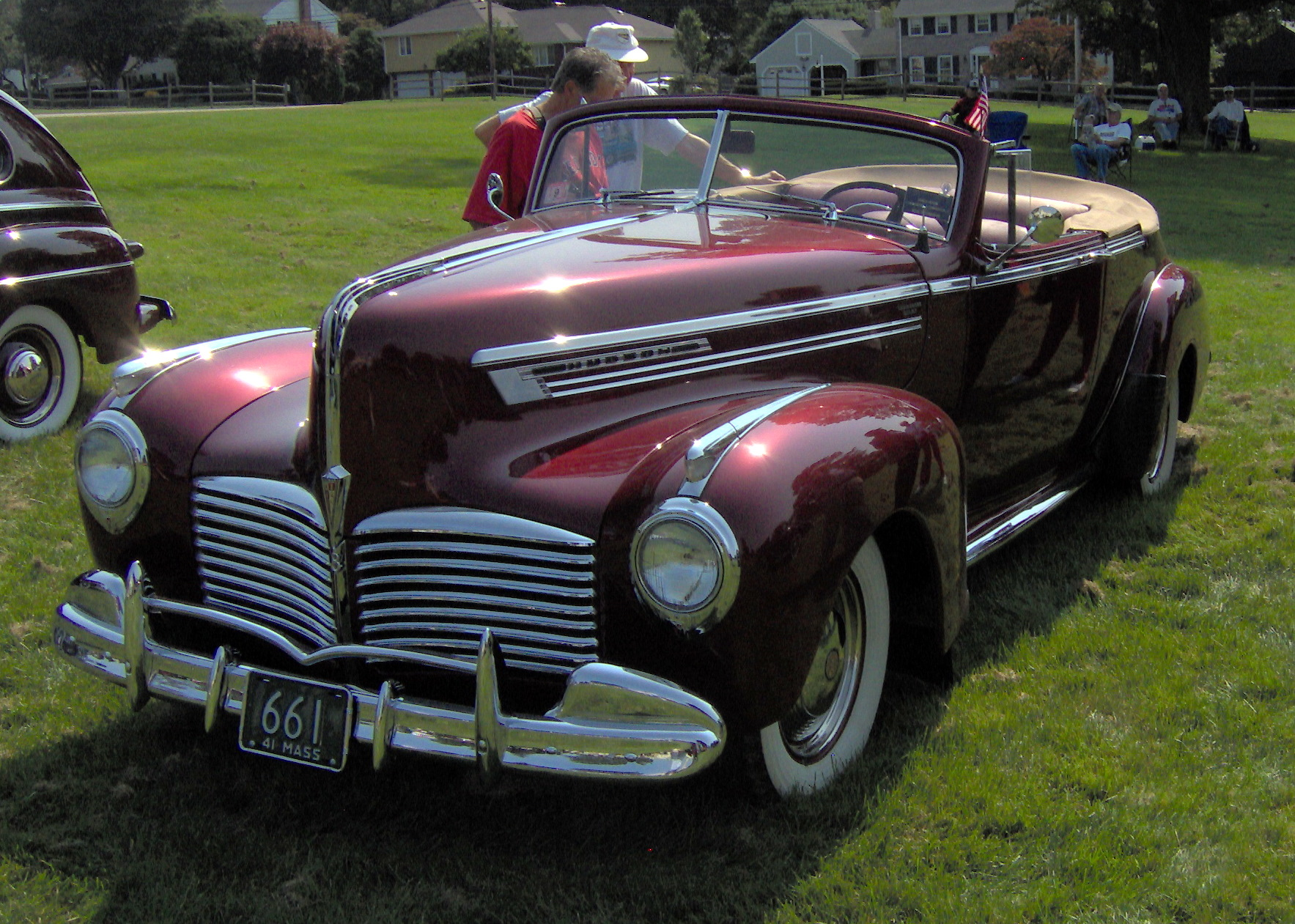
- 1941 Hudson Commodore 8 Convertible

Overview
- Production: 1941–1942

Body and chassis
- Body style: 2-door coupe 4-door sedan 2-door convertible

Powertrain
- Engine: 212 cu in (3.5 L) I6; 254 cu in (4.2 L) I8
- Power output: 92–102 hp (93.3–103.4 PS; 68.6–76.1 kW) @ 4,000 rpm 120–145 lb⋅ft (162.7–196.6 N⋅m) @ 1,600 rpm
- Transmission: 3-speed Manual; 3-speed manual with overdrive

Dimensions
- Wheelbase: 121 in (3,073 mm); Custom sedan: 128 in (3,251 mm)
- Length: 203.25 in (5,163 mm)
- Width: 76.5 in (1,943 mm)
- Height: 68.8 in (1,748 mm)
- Curb weight: 2,950–3,230 lb (1,338–1,465 kg)

=== 1941 ===
Introduced as luxury models, the 1941 Commodores offered a blend of performance, comfort, and style that was marketed as "Symphonic Styling." Hudson introduced interior colors and fabrics that coordinated with the exterior paint at no extra charge. Elements of the interior and exterior were styled by Betty Thatcher, "the first woman designer to be employed by a car manufacturer".

The Commodore series was Hudson's largest model range at launch, comprising sedans, coupes, and convertibles. A Commodore Eight station wagon, Hudson's first of this body style, with only about 100 made.

The Commodore Series 12 and Series 14 were the junior models to the Commodore Custom Series 15 and Series 17. The junior models debuted in Hudson's 1941 model line. Commodore Series 12 featured an I6 engine, and the Series 14 models came with an I8, with all built on a 121-inch (3,073 mm) wheelbase, while Commodore Customs utilized a 121 in (3,073 mm) wheelbase for Series 15 coupes and a 128 in (3,251 mm) version for Series 17 sedans.

The Commodore was powered by Hudson's 202 cu in (3.3 L) I6 producing 102 bhp (76 kW), or by Hudson's 254.4 cu in (4.2 L) I8 that was rated at 128 bhp (95 kW). All included a "Fluid-Cushioned Clutch" in a mineral oil-filled sealed bell housing. Instead of typical dry-plate friction, a single driving plate had heat-treated cork inserts. The oil-soaked cork inserts pressed into the thin metal clutch disc offered smooth, non-jerky engagement while the sealed "Hudsonite" oil-filled system provided continuous lubrication and heat dissipation.

Prices listed for the Series 12 coupe started at US$1,028 ($22,502 in 2025 dollars) to the top level Custom Series 17 8 seven-place sedan at US$1,537 ($33,644 in 2025 dollars).

Hudson designed a forward hinged hood, with a release lever by the steering column, that opened from the rear by the windshield with the front end of the hood sliding downward over the grille. Marketing focused on "America's safest car" that included standard features "that 'think' for you when there's no time for you to think!" The Commodores included "Double-Safe Hydraulics" that provided a separate mechanical braking system to back-up the hydraulic brakes using the same brake pedal. A handbrake for parking on the dashboard provided a third way to apply the brakes. The independent front suspension featured coil springs that was previously available on much more expensive cars and a patented "Auto-Poise Front Wheel Control" designed "to help keep wheels on their course - on rough roads, in heavy side winds, even if a tire blows.

Available options included a "Sleeper Kit" from Hudson dealers for the sedan models to save time and money when traveling, which formed a double bed in the car through the trunk without disturbing the front seat. Three radios were available starting with an inexpensive manual-tuned, 5-tube "Junior." a "DeLuxe" 6-tube set with push-button tuning, and a new "Custom" 8-tube version for voices or music without distortion and push-button station selection.

=== 1942 ===
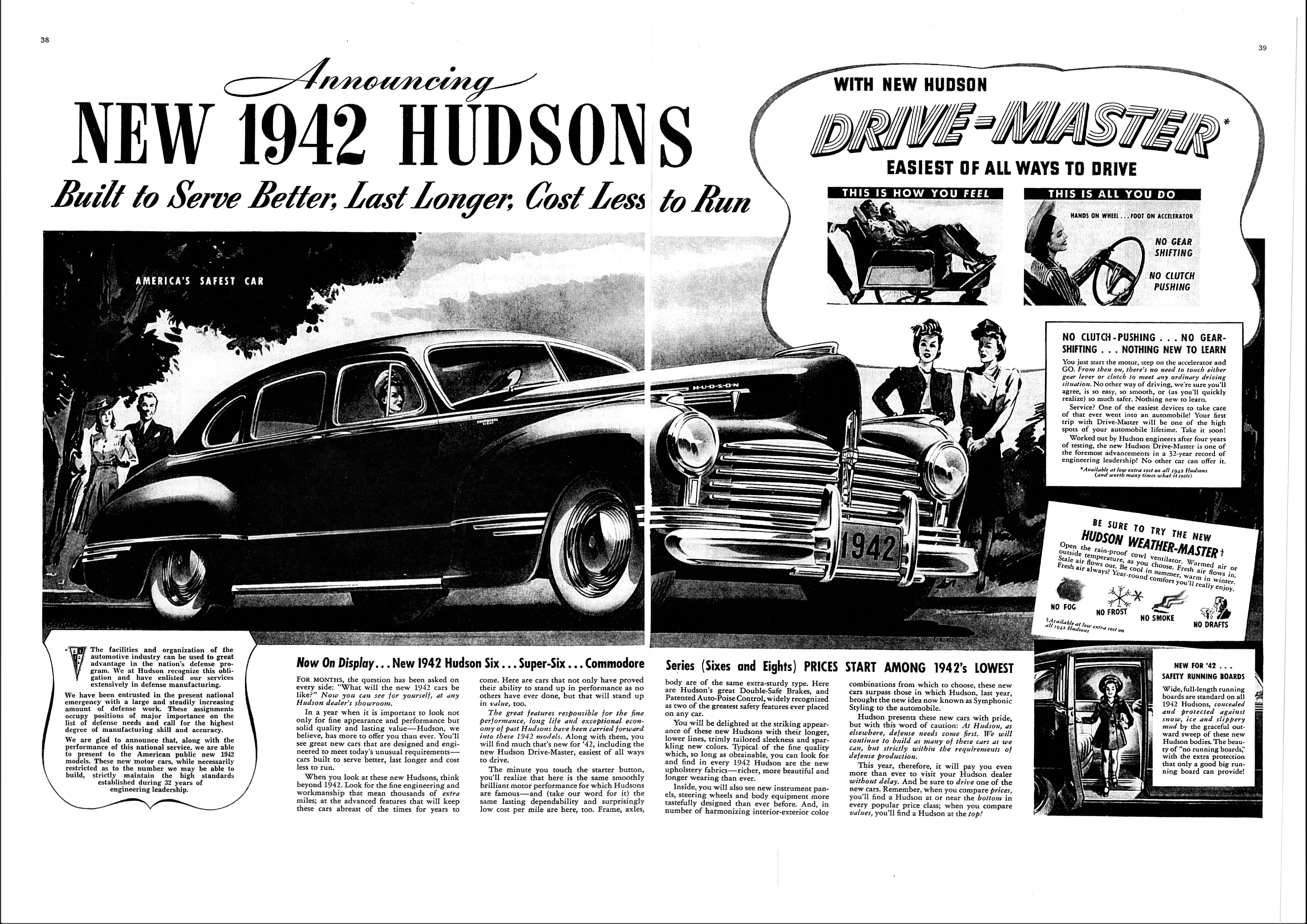
1942 Hudson announcement advertisement

The 1942 model year Hudsons were released in August 1941. The cars received a facelift. This included concealed running boards, changed front grilles, and external trim arrangements that included a white-triangle logo on the sides of the prowl lit up when the headlights were on. The station wagon was discontinued. Prices increased.

A pioneering semi-automatic transmission feature was introduced called the "Drive-Master." The option was Hudson's response to the Hydra-Matic transmission introduced by General Motors. Drive-Master consisted of vacuum cylinders, solenoids, and switches that controlled both the clutch and gear changes. Three modes were selected by a knob on the dashboard:

- Manual - the system was deactivated, and the driver used the clutch pedal and gear shift lever as normal.
- "Vacumotive Drive" - the driver manually shifted gears, but the clutch was operated automatically by vacuum power when the accelerator pedal was pressed or released. This eliminated the need to manually press the clutch pedal to shift or come to a stop.
- "Drive-Master" - both clutching and shifting were automatic. To start, the driver shifted into high gear and pressed the accelerator. The car started in second gear and accelerated in what Hudson called "Pick-Up" gear. When the driver lifted their foot off the accelerator, the system automatically shifted the transmission into high gear. When the car was braked to a stop, the system automatically shifted back into the Pick-Up gear.

The automaker promoted the Commodore's economy over luxury. The early production cars came with chrome trim, but switched to painted metal after 1 January 1942. Production of all civilian vehicles ended on 5 February 1942 to free up resources for World War II. Hudson assembled a total of 5,396 cars for the 1942 model year before the shutdown.

== Second generation ==
Second generation
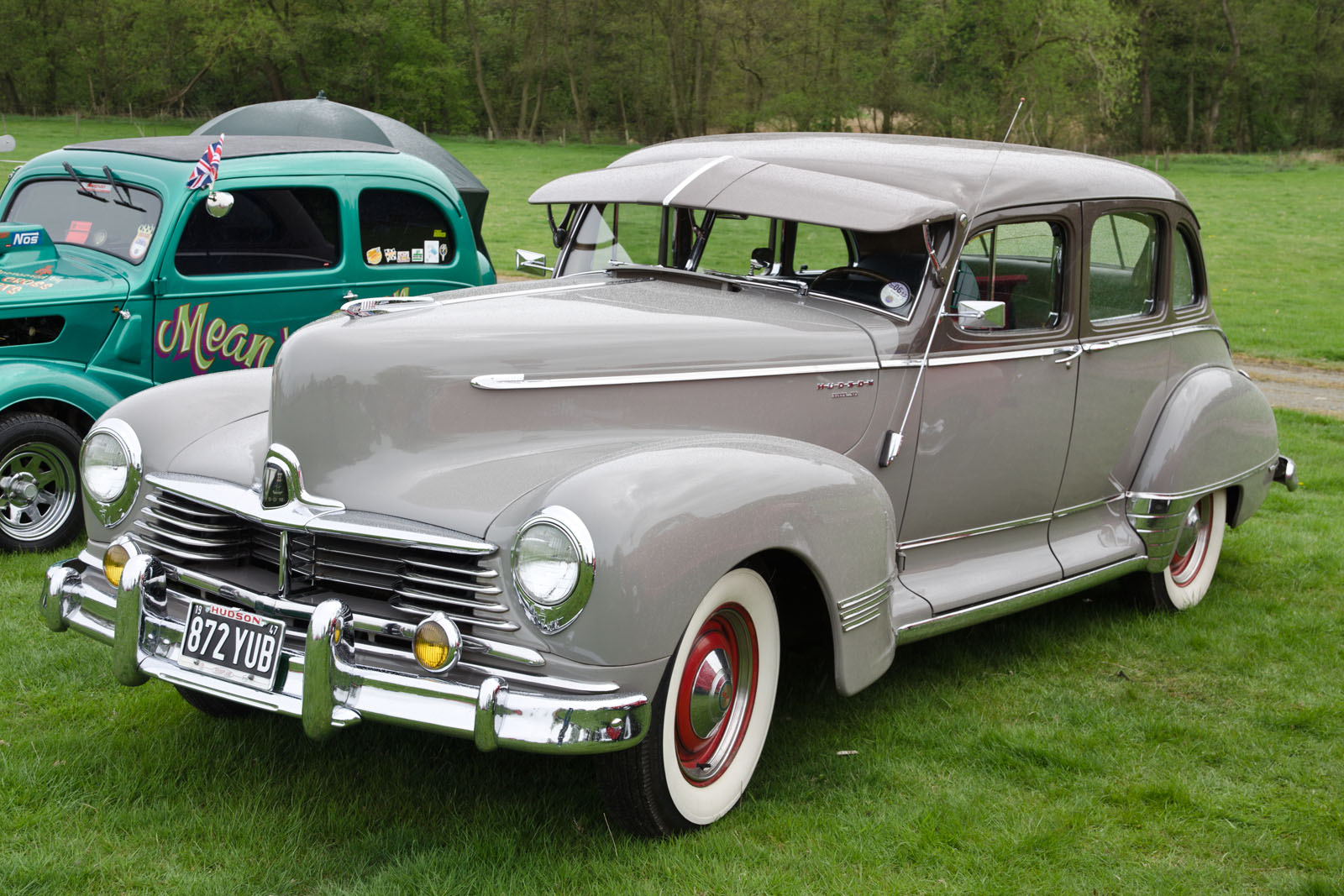
- 1947 Hudson Commodore Super Six four-door sedan

Overview
- Production: 1946–1947

Body and chassis
- Body style: 2-door coupe 4-door sedan 2-door convertible 2-door pickup

Powertrain
- Engine: 212 cu in (3.5 L) I6; 254 cu in (4.2 L) I8
- Power output: 102–128 hp (103.4–129.8 PS; 76.1–95.4 kW) @ 4,000 rpm 156–185 lb⋅ft (211.5–250.8 N⋅m) @ 1,750 rpm
- Transmission: 3-speed Manual; 3-speed manual with overdrive Vacumotive Drive; Drive-Master (with Vacumotive)

Dimensions
- Wheelbase: 121 in (3,073 mm)
- Length: 207.4 in (5,268 mm)
- Width: 72.8 in (1,849 mm)
- Height: 68 in (1,727 mm)
- Curb weight: 3,150–3,600 lb (1,429–1,633 kg)

=== 1946 ===
Hudson began postwar automobile production on 30 August 1945. The designs were based on the 1942 models but are generally considered to be the Commodore's second generation. The exterior received minor cosmetic changes from the pre-war versions, with one exception: the car's grille now featured a prominent concave center section.

All Hudson automobiles were more fully equipped than competitive makes, including standard door armrests, twin air horns, ashtrays, windshield wipers, stop lights, a locking glove box, sealed-beam headlights, and deep-pile carpeting. The Commodore and Commodore Customs added foam rubber seat cushions (Hudson was the first automaker to introduce foam seat cushions in 1939), door-step courtesy lights, a rear center armrest (sedans), and gold-etched lettering on the dashboard panel.

Three transmission options were an overdrive unit for the three-speed manual ($88), a $40 "Vacumotive Drive," and a $98 "Drive-Master" with Vacumotive.

=== 1947 ===
The priority was building cars after the war to satisfy market demand, rather than introducing annual design changes for 1947. Moreover, Hudson was in the process of developing a completely new automobile design. Changes for 1947 were limited to the chrome nameplate on the trunk lid, right- and left-side exterior door locks, and a small lip on the triangle medallion housing above the grille.

Production of the 1947 Hudson Commodore Eight increased to 12,593 from the previous year's 8,193. The second generation of the Commodore "only lasted two years before its ground-breaking replacement appeared."

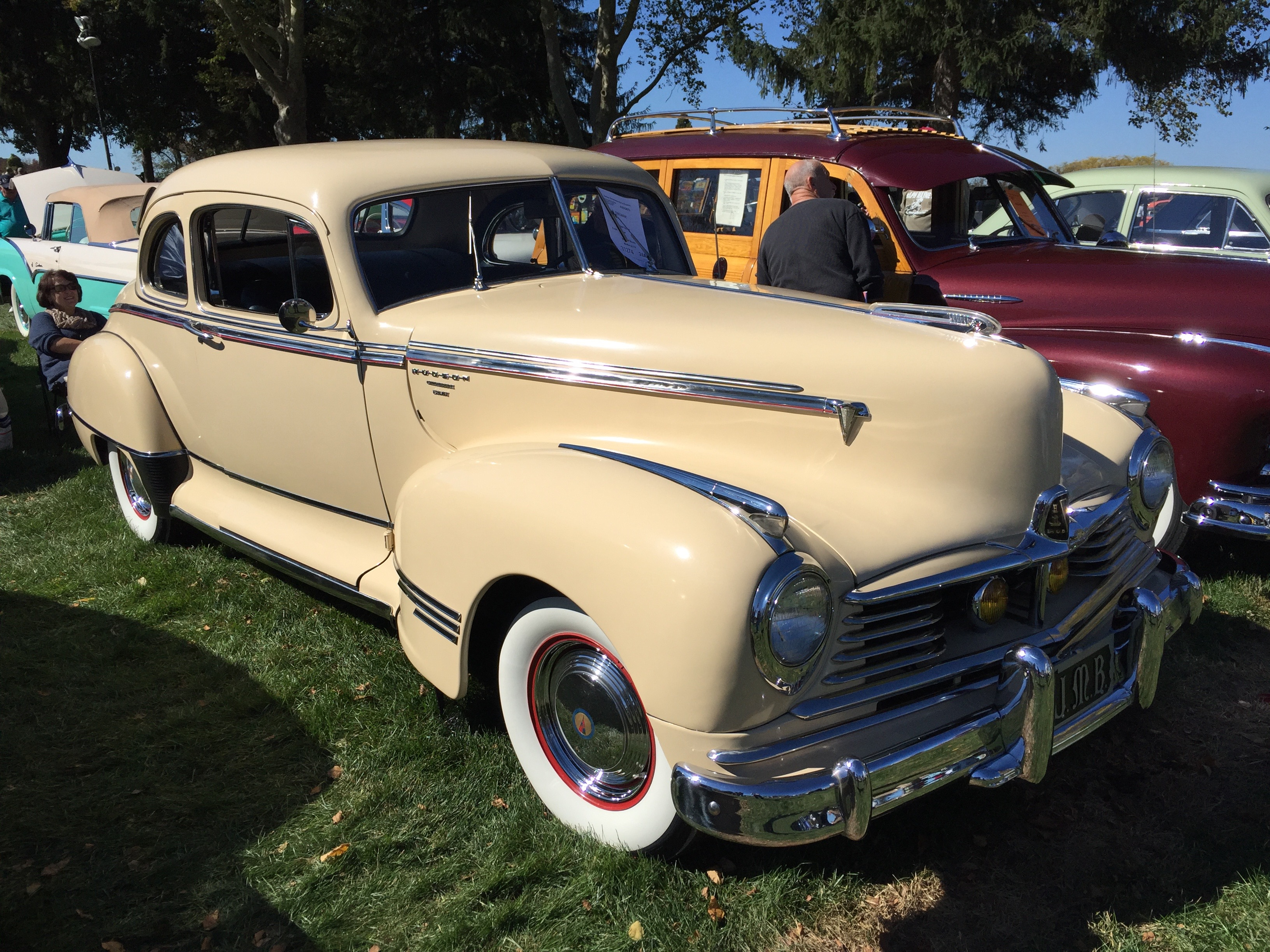
1946 Hudson Commodore Eight Club Coupe

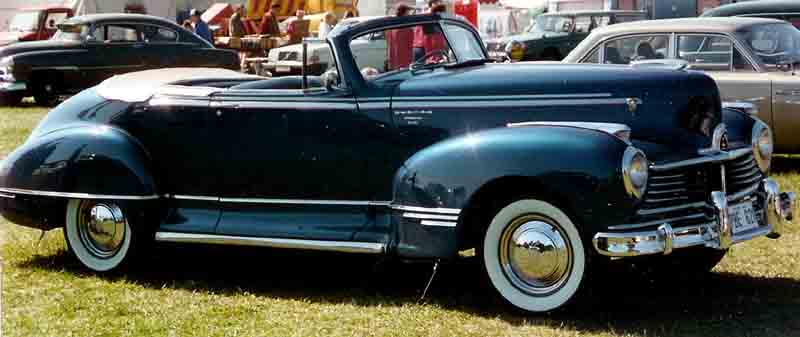
1947 Hudson Commodore Eight Convertible Brougham

== Third generation ==
Third generation
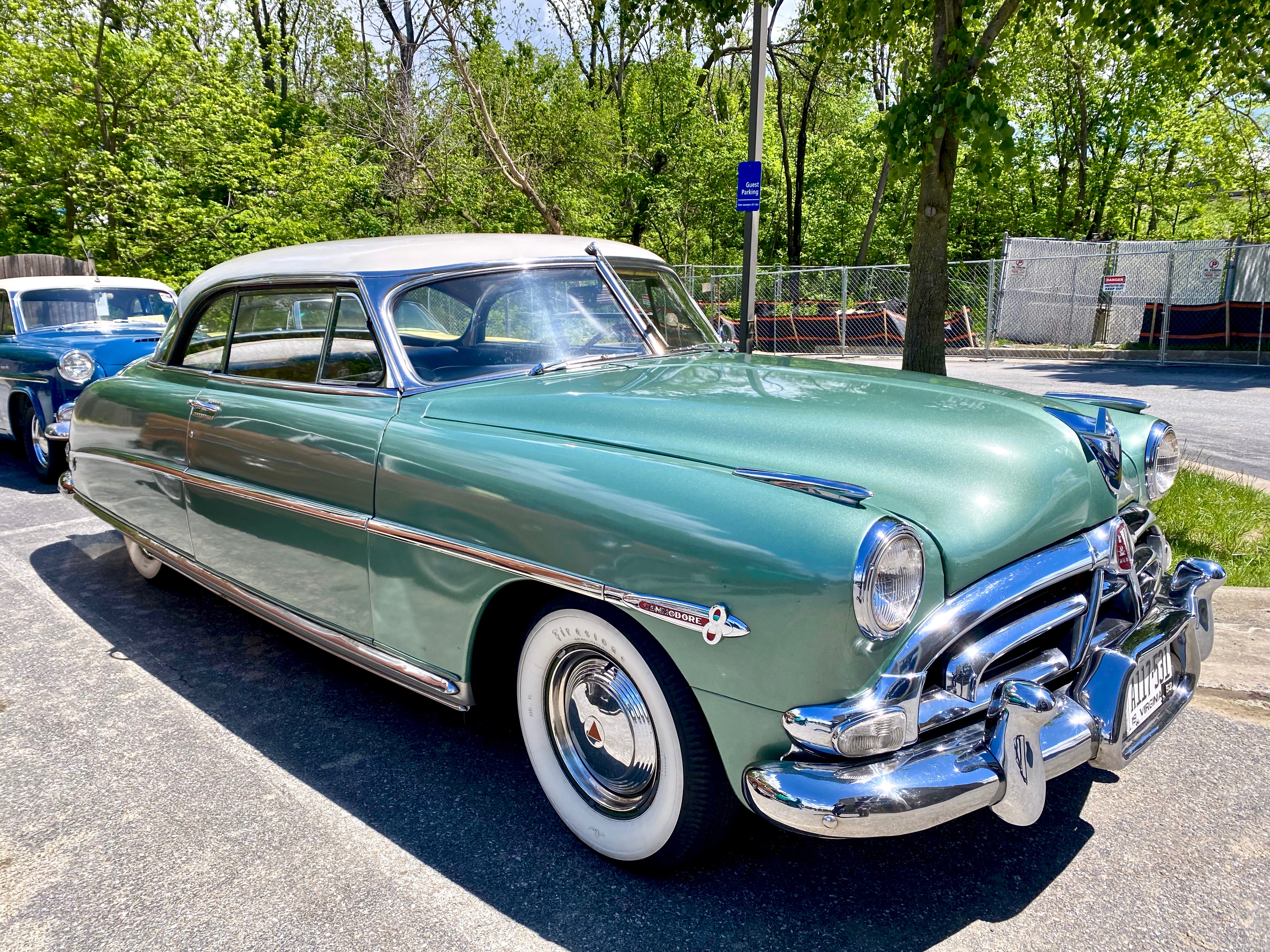
- 1952 Hudson Commodore Eight two-door hardtop

Overview
- Production: 1948–1952

Body and chassis
- Body style: 2-door coupe 4-door sedan 2-door hardtop (1951-1952); 2-door convertible

Powertrain
- Engine: 262 cu in (4.3 L) I6; 254 cu in (4.2 L) I8
- Power output: 121–145 hp (122.7–147.0 PS; 90.2–108.1 kW) @ 4,500 rpm 195–230 lb⋅ft (264.4–311.8 N⋅m) @ 2,000 rpm
- Transmission: 3-speed Manual; 3-speed manual with overdrive Hydramatic automatic (1951-1952)

Dimensions
- Wheelbase: 124 in (3,150 mm)
- Length: 208 in (5,283 mm)
- Width: 77.6 in (1,971 mm)
- Height: 60.4 in (1,534 mm)
- Curb weight: 3,595–3,904 lb (1,631–1,771 kg)

=== 1948 ===
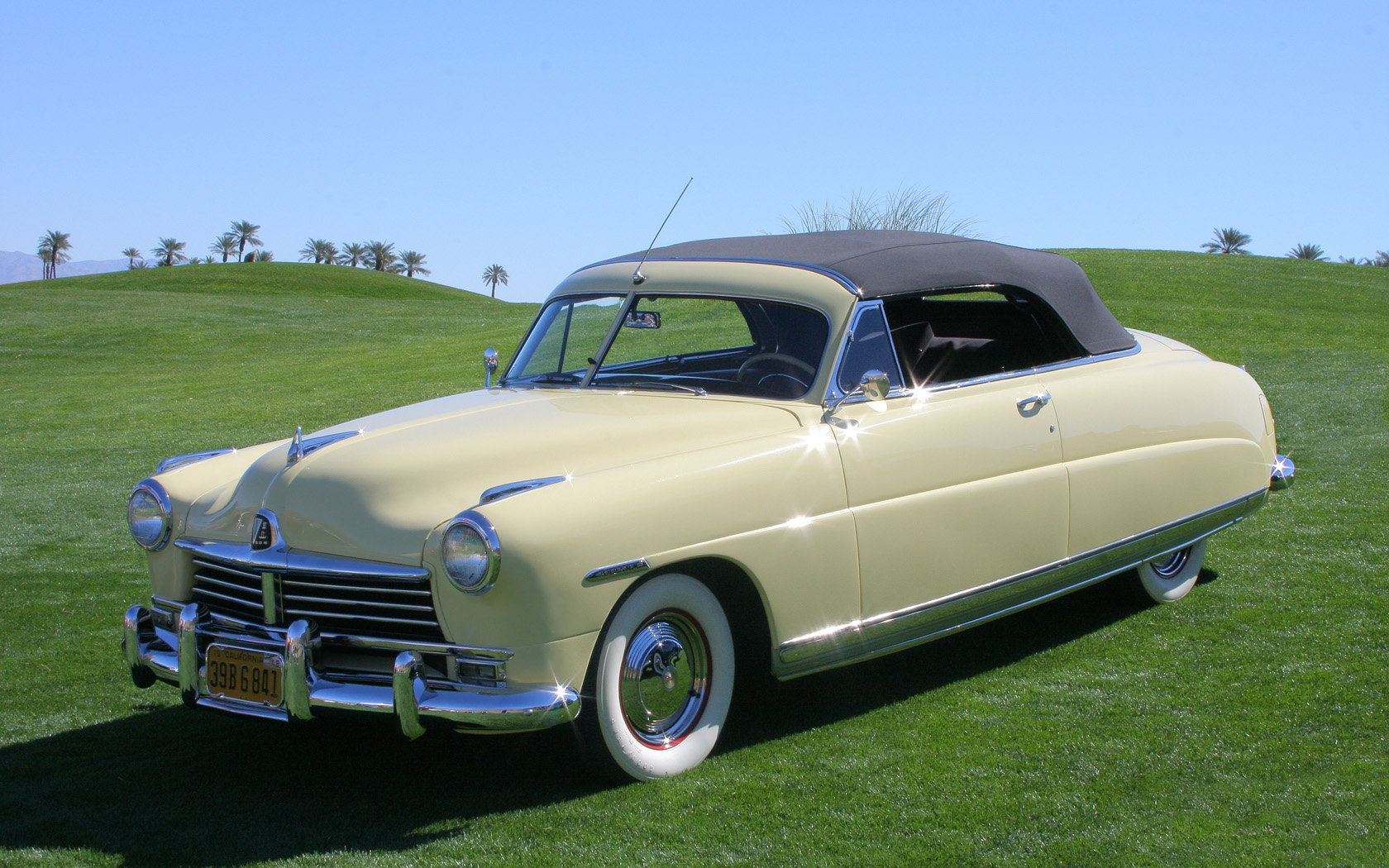
1948 Hudson Commodore Convertible Brougham

Hudson developed a new and radical car design for the third generation of the Commodore that is "often hailed as one of the great post-war designs." Production of the 1948 Hudsons began on 12 October 1947. Introduced on 7 December 1947, the Hudson Commodore was one of the first new-design postwar cars made. The 1948 model year inaugurated Hudson's trademarked "Monobuilt" construction or "step-down" automobile. The new cars were designed by Frank Spring and, in part, by Betty Thatcher, the first female designer to be employed by a car manufacturer. The marketing tagline for the innovative Hudsons was "Now You're Face to Face with Tomorrow."

The cars had a light and strong semi-unit body with a perimeter frame. Because of the encircling frame, passengers stepped down into the vehicles. Hudson's step-down design lowered the body below that of contemporary cars. It offered passengers protection by surrounding them with the car's chassis, which has a lower center of gravity. In addition to the safety provided by the car's chassis, the step-down also allowed Hudson to achieve weight savings through unibody construction, resulting in a well-performing automobile. The "monobuilt" or step-down design also required less steel for its production.

The cars featured slab-sided bodies with fully integrated fenders. The Brougham and sedans were of a fastback design, while convertibles and coupes were notchbacks. A character line ran from the front to back, further lowering the car even more visually, so "the new Hudson looked like a dream car straight from the auto show."

In 1948, Commodores came in one series. They were available in either the I6 or the I8 engine. The Hudson I8 L-head engine originated in 1930. It was considered an advanced design for its time, evolving into 254 cu in (4.2 L) with few significant changes. This was the premium engine for the top-of-the-line Commodores and available through 1952. The 1948 six-cylinder models introduced a new 262 cu in (4.3 L) I6 engine rated at 121 hp (123 PS; 90 kW). The I6 made only 7 hp (7 PS; 5 kW) less than the I8 engine, but the I8 added smoothness and drivability. The new I6 provided performance with 0-40 mph acceleration in 12 seconds with Drive-Master while stick-shift cars were faster. The new six in the new Step-Down platform transformed the cars into one of quickest and most-roadworthy cars in the United States.

The interiors were upholstered in broadcloth on sedans and leather on convertibles. Hudson continued to offer numerous standard features that other manufacturers charged extra for. Not only were the 1948 models "truly significant new designs of the early postwar years, but the 'Step-Down' Hudson was low and sleek, which many consumers enjoyed." Total Commodore production was 62,474, of which 35,315 were the I8 models.

==== Sir Vival ====
In response to the increasing number of deaths on highways in the United States after World War II, an innovative concept car was designed and built for safety rather than for style or speed. Using two 1948 Hudsons, Walter Jerome, built a hinged two-section car to minimize impact of collisions. Among its many features are a centrally-positioned, raised 36 in (914 mm) turret-shaped driver compartment providing panoramic visibility, as well as safety equipment that would later become standard on production vehicles such as rubber bumpers, seat belts, and side marker lights. Jerome had purchased the two donor Hudsons from Bellingham Motors, a Hudson dealership in Massachusetts, and was planning to build up to a dozen Sir Vivals per year, but only the prototype was completed and in early-1970s, it went back to Bellingham Motors for storage. With the closing of Bellingham Motors, in 2022 it was sold to Lane Motor Museum which plans to restore it.

=== 1949 ===
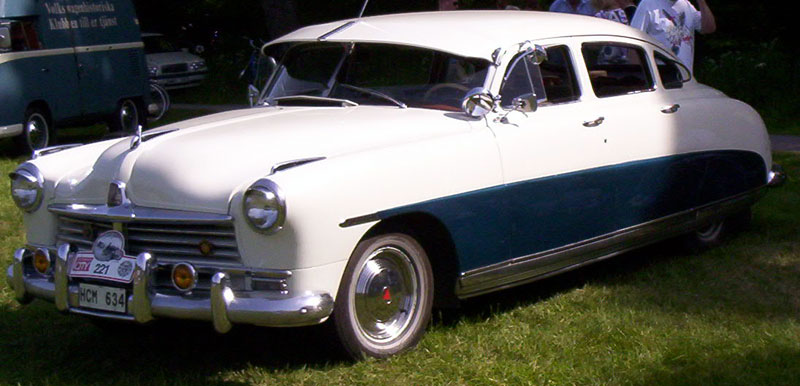
1949 Hudson Commodore sedan

The body styles for 1949 were identical to those of the previous year. The Commodore line was enlarged to include more luxurious "Custom" trim models. The body styles were identical.

As a marketing promotion, Hudson had plastic specialists use scaled-down blueprints to develop transparent models of the Commodore Eight sedan to demonstrate and promote the design and construction of the cars.

=== 1950 ===
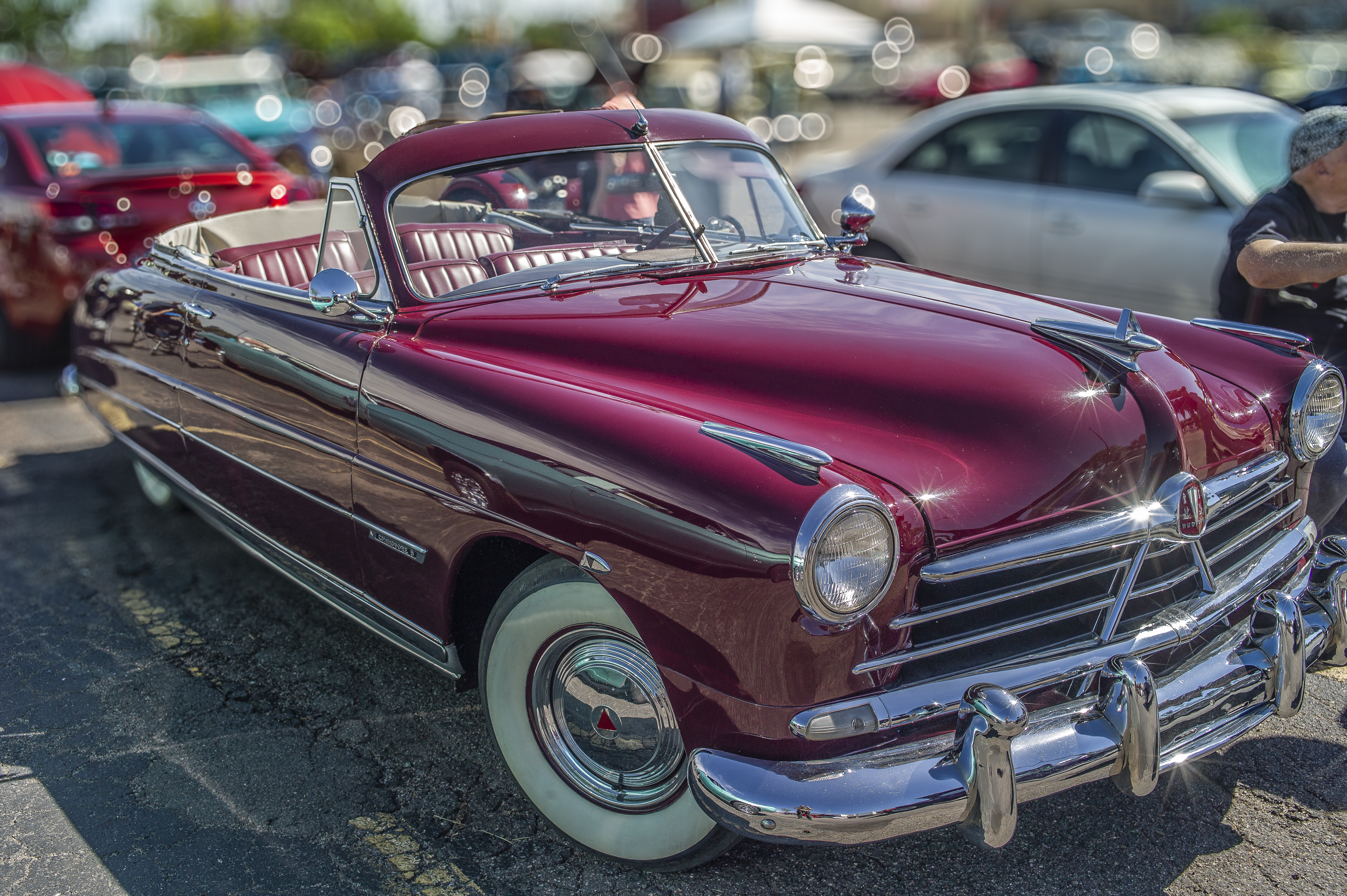
1950 Hudson Commodore 6 Convertible

The most noticeable change for the 1950 model year was the restyled grille, which superimposed Hudson's signature triangle logo on four horizontal bars. This would become the "Hudson look." The 1950 models included a new split-back window and redesigned interiors. A new Custom Commodore convertible model debuted in mid-April 1950.

Hudson added overdrive to the Drive-Master for 1950 and named it "Super-Matic Drive."

=== 1951 ===
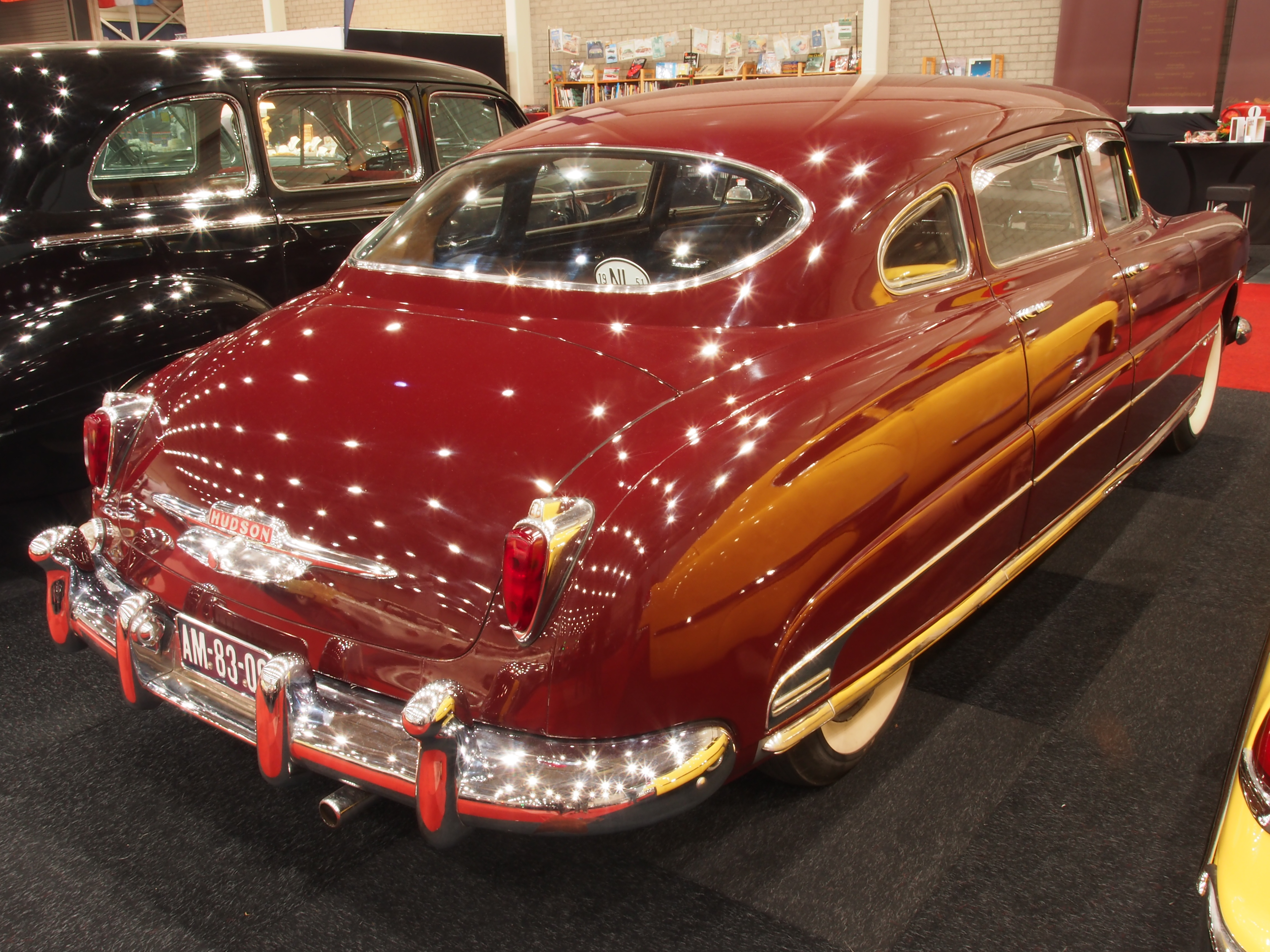
1951 Hudson Commodore Custom four-door sedan

In 1951, Hudson introduced a new I6 engine. General Motors' fully-automatic Hydra-Matic transmission became an option. The grille was redesigned from a rather rectangular shape to an oval shape. This design would carry through to 1953.

To keep up with marketplace trends, Hudson introduced its first pillarless hardtop body style during the model year. Named "Hollywood", the new two-door design was available in the Commodore series with production beginning in January 1951.

=== 1952 ===
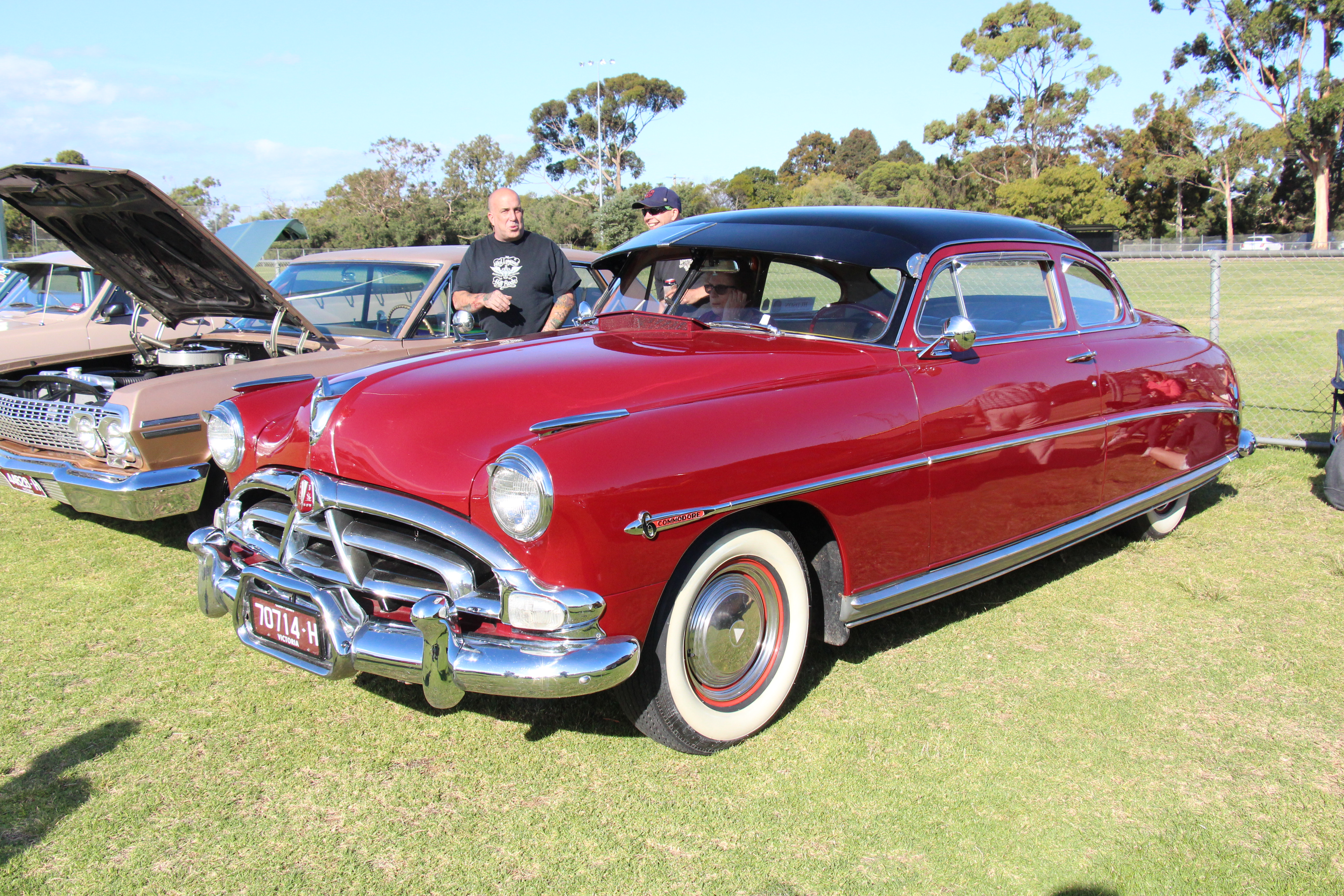
1952 Hudson Commodore Six coupe

In its final model year, 1952, the Commodore was split into the Six Series and the Eight Series. The exterior received another trim change. Both series were available in four body styles: a two-door Club Coupe, a four-door Sedan, a Convertible Brougham, and a two-door "Hollywood" hardtop. Seven solid colors were standard with four special colors optional as well as 15 two-tone combinations (except for convertibles).

Hudson lacked the resources to keep adding new body styles and exciting changes to keep up with the competition from the other automakers, whose annual redesigns added tailfins and more chrome trim that consumers wanted. Instead of redesigning the aging "set-down" models, company President A. E. Barit pushed ahead with the firm's plan for the Jet compact.

== Discontinuation ==
Beginning in 1953, Hudson would field only the Hudson Hornet and Hudson Wasp line, as well as introduce the entirely new Hudson Jet compact car line.

Following Hudson's merger with Nash to form American Motors Corporation (AMC) in 1954, Hudson's automobile production was moved to AMC's facility in Kenosha, Wisconsin. Following slow sales of the 1955 model year, AMC turned over Hudson styling to Richard Arbib, who created a unique look for the Hudson line based on what he termed "V-Line" styling. However, the new design did not attract buyers to Hudson, and production fell even further.

== 1957 show car ==
In its final year, the Hudson brand was pared down to a single model, the Hudson Hornet, available in two trim levels, the top-level Custom and the Super. However, during the show car season, AMC prepared a one-off 1957 Hudson Commodore show car. It was identical to the production Hornet, but featuring gold exterior trim and unique upholstery.

== Station wagon 2007 re-creation ==
In 1946, Hudson hired an experienced Army illustrator for instruction manuals and training materials. Don Butler assisted with the final design drawings for the upcoming 1948 Hudsons. However, he also sketched unofficial proposals for Hudson that included a station wagon, a pickup, and a town car. Butler's illustrations were an inspiration to build a Commodore station wagon. A 1948 Hudson Commodore Eight four-door sedan served a donor with another car's roof added for the station wagon's rear section. The woodie was hand-made of ash framing with mahogany veneer panels. The car is a modern realization of an unbuilt postwar design.

== Notable owner ==
Actor Steve McQueen owned four Hudsons that he drove around Los Angeles. His 1950 Hudson Commodore Six Brougham was the only convertible. McQueen upgraded the standard I6 with a 308 cu in (5.0 L) Twin-H version from a Hudson Hornet. The car was placed on the market in 2019, along with a registration card documenting McQueen's ownership in 1979.

== Movie appearance ==
A 1949 Hudson Commodore sedan driven by Morgan Freeman (as Hoke Colburn) achieved "worldwide fame" as it was one the star cars in the 1989 Oscar-winning movie Driving Miss Daisy that also suggests the "association between freedom and driving." The movie has been described as "de-stressing," especially the driving scenes in the Hudson Commodore as it "is a beautiful car and a fabulous ride..."

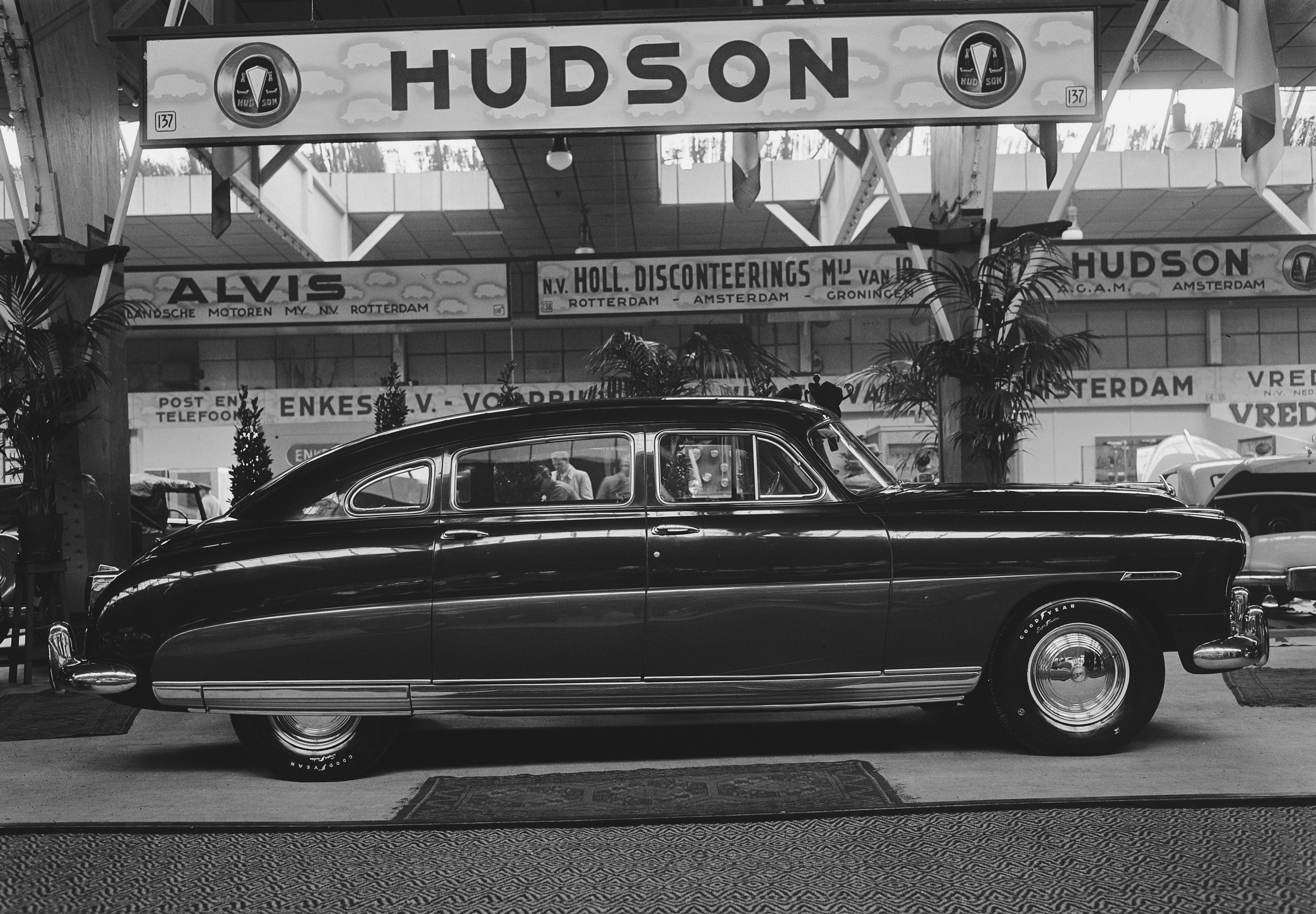
3rd gen Commodore sedan at 1948 Amsterdam AutoRAI

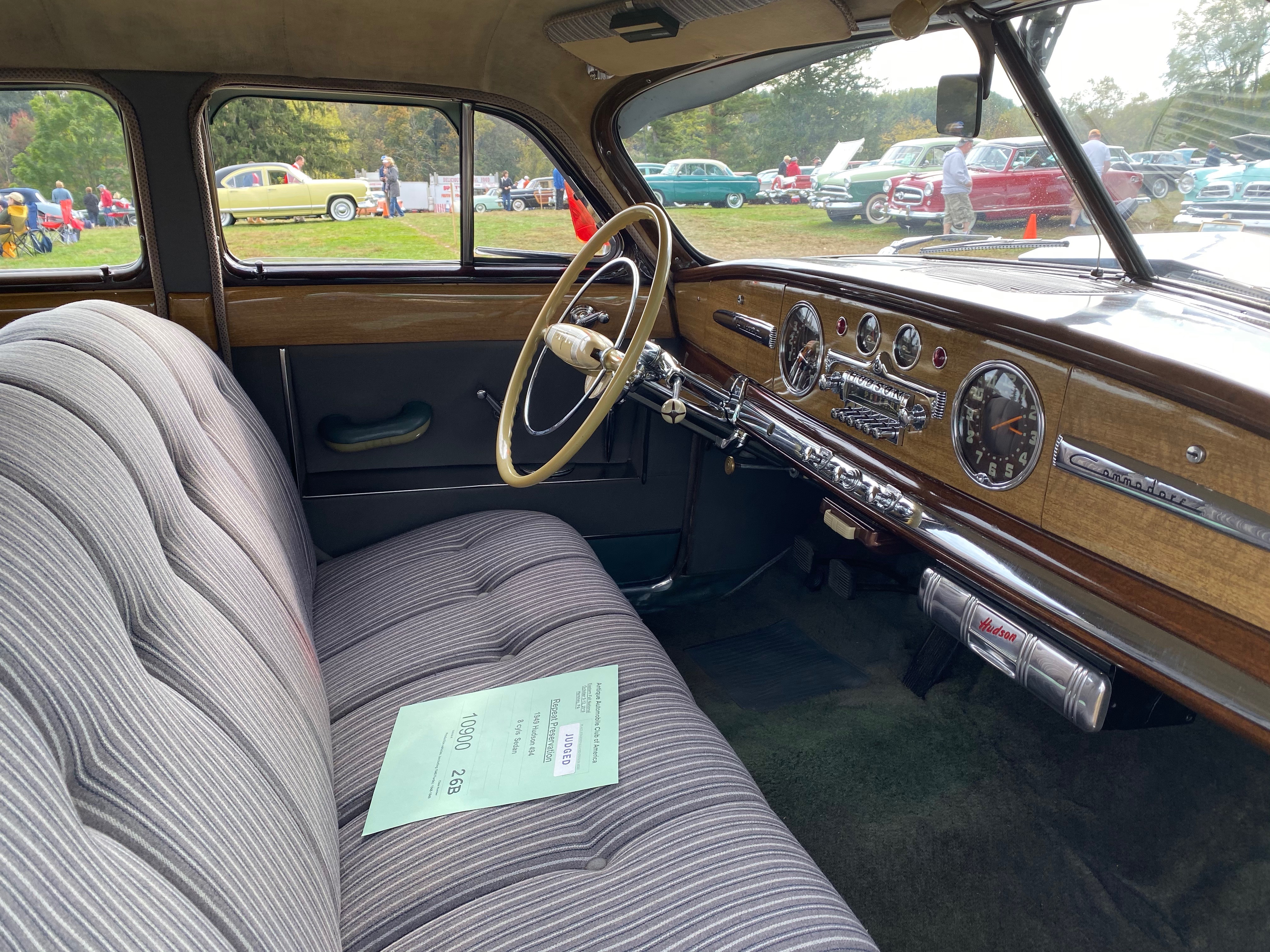
1949 Hudson Commodore sedan interior

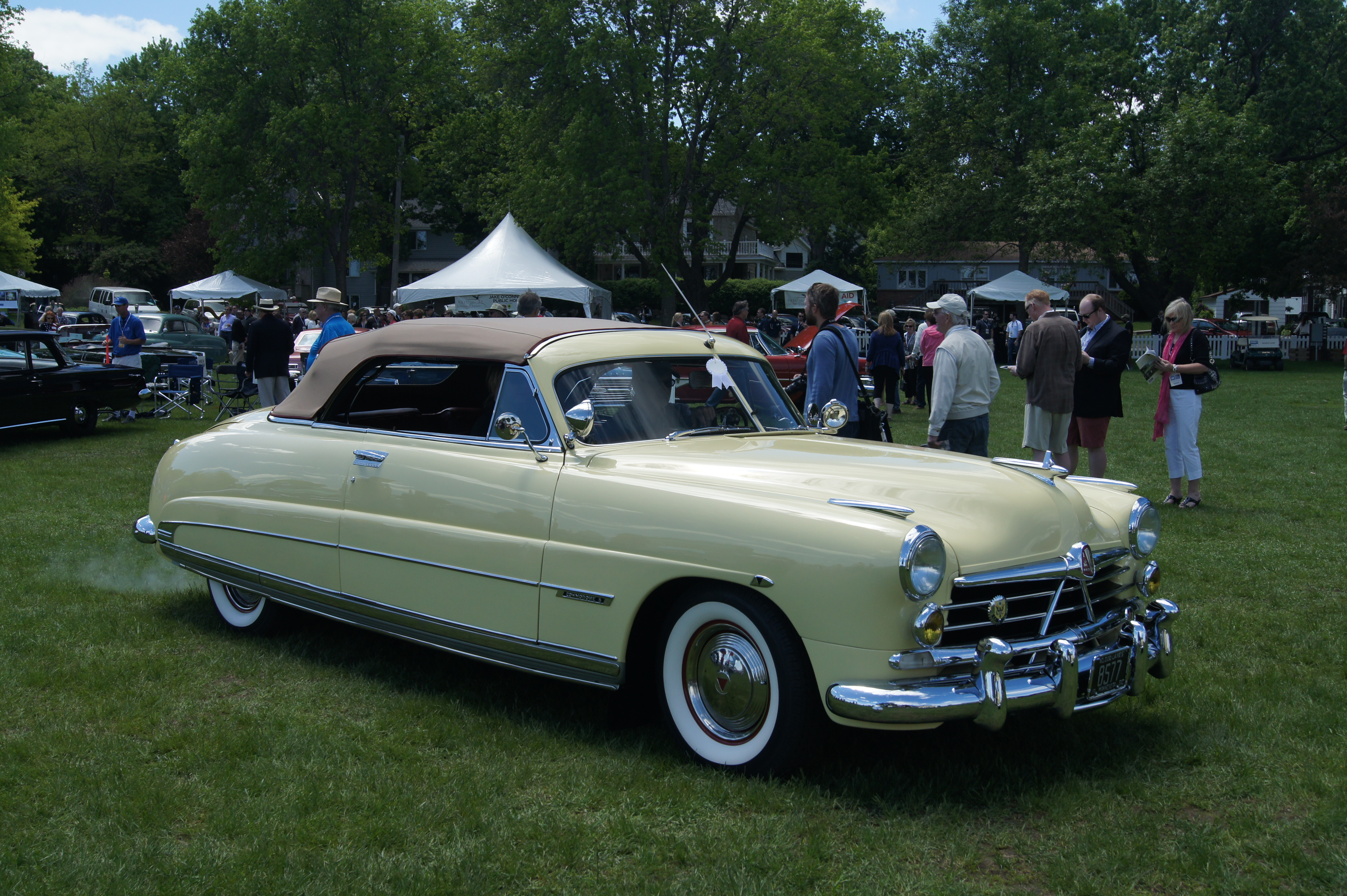
1950 Hudson Custom Commodore Convertible Brougham
