= Motor Trend Car of the Year =

American magazine annual award

The Motor Trend Car of the Year (COTY) is an annual Car of the Year award given by Motor Trend magazine to recognize the best new or significantly refreshed car in a given model year.

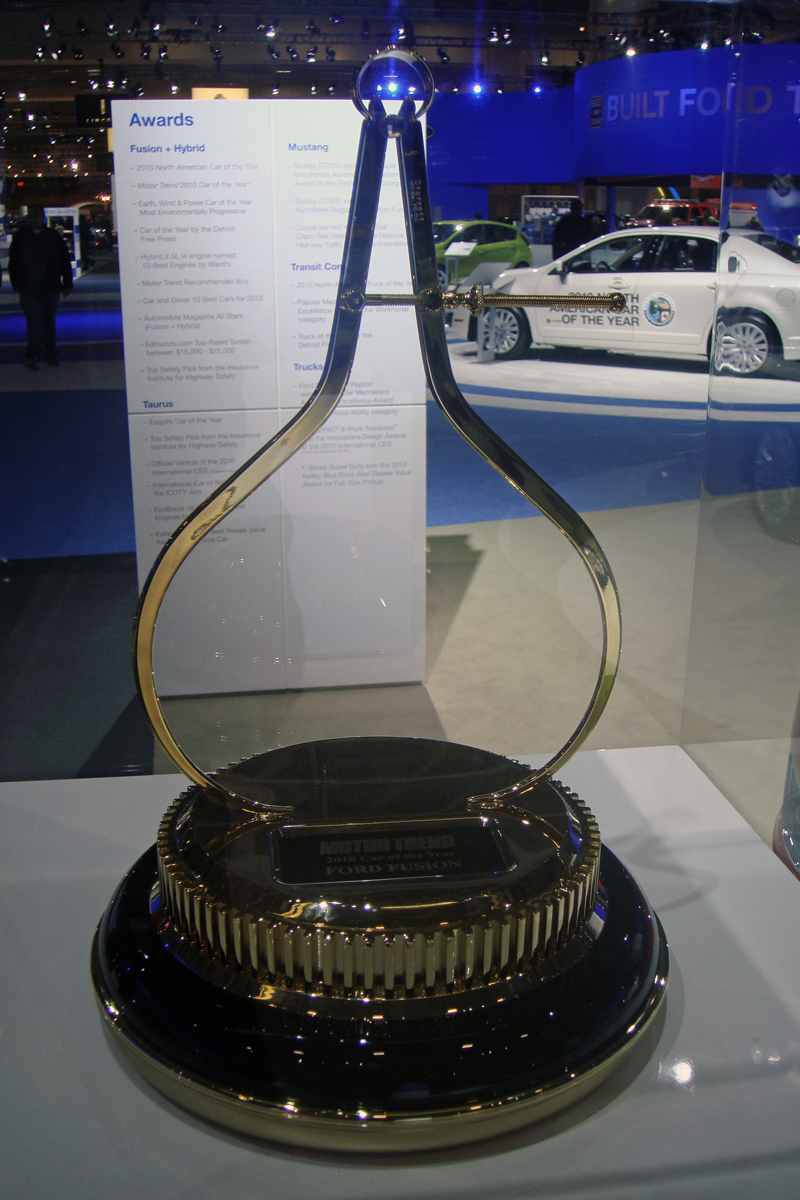
Motor Trend Car of the Year "golden calipers" trophy

== Background ==
Motor Trend, which debuted in 1949, was the first publication to name a Car of the Year. The inaugural Motor Trend Car of the Year award recognized Cadillac's V8 engine in 1949 (77 years ago).

The earliest awards were given to the manufacturer or division, not for a specific vehicle. The 1958 Ford Thunderbird became the first single model to be selected. In 1970, the Ford Torino won the COTY while Motor Trend selected the Porsche 914 for its first Import COTY award.

In 1972, the low-volume imported Citroën SM won the overall COTY award. Between 1976 and 1999, the COTY award was split in two: Domestic COTY and Import COTY.

The trophy was recombined in 2000 because the distinctions between domestic and import cars became increasingly difficult. The award has expanded to include a pickup truck (starting in 1979) and a separate sport utility vehicle (starting in 1999), which are recognized separately from the Car of the Year.

Over time, other publications and organizations have copied Motor Trend's Car of the Year award and created their own. These COTY designations may focus on regional markets, vehicle types, specific market segments, or other criteria. Some examples include the European Car of the Year that began in 1964 by a collective of automobile magazines, the Green Car of the Year selected by a panel of automotive and environmental experts, the Tow Car of the Year chosen by selected sponsors in the industry, and the Fleet Car of the Year that is voted by professional fleet managers.

== Impact ==
The trophy for the winner, a depiction of calipers, is often used in the winning automaker's marketing and advertising. Most cars that win the award report a spike in sales.

== Criteria ==
To be eligible for the award, a car must be an "all-new" or "substantially upgraded" vehicle that has been on sale within twelve months from the previous November, vehicles that have been on sale for over five years are ineligible for the award.

Between the contenders, it is not a comparison test. In 2014 as an example, the Motor Trend judges debated and evaluate each vehicle against six key criteria:

Criteria	Note
Design Advancement	well-executed exterior and interior styling; innovative vehicle packaging; selection of materials
Engineering Excellence	vehicle concept and execution; clever solutions to packaging, manufacturing and dynamics issues; cost-effective technology that benefits the consumer
Efficiency	low fuel consumption and carbon footprint, relative to the vehicle's competitive set
Safety	active: help the driver avoid a crash; secondary: protect occupants from harm during a crash
Value	competitive price and equipment levels, measured against vehicles in the same market segment
Performance of Intended Function	how well the vehicle does the job its planners, designers, and engineers intended

Motor Trend also only considers cars with base MSRPs less than $150,000 in order to avoid expensive luxury and super cars dominating the competition.

Vehicles are subjected to a battery of tests: standard car tests such as skid-pad ratings, acceleration and quarter-mile times, and evaluations of the interiors are combined with a track run conducted by Sports Car Club of America-licensed testers and taking the cars out on normal roads to test their drivability under normal conditions, and fuel economy. Trucks and SUVs add towing capacity and speed, plus an off-road course, to the normal regimen.

== Car of the Year Winners ==
Note that in 1970 and between 1976–2000, the Car of the Year award was split into two categories, domestic and import.

Year	Winner
2027	Mercedes-Benz S-Class (W223)
2026	Volkswagen Golf GTI / Golf R
2025	Mercedes-Benz E-Class / All-Terrain
2024	Toyota Prius / Prius Prime
2023	Genesis G90
2022	Lucid Air
2021	Mercedes Benz E-Class
2020	Chevrolet Corvette Stingray
2019	Genesis G70
2018	Alfa Romeo Giulia / Giulia Quadrifoglio
2017	Chevrolet Bolt EV
2016	Chevrolet Camaro
2015	Volkswagen Golf
2014	Cadillac CTS
2013	Tesla Model S
2012	Volkswagen Passat
2011	Chevrolet Volt
2010	Ford Fusion
2009	Nissan GT-R
2008	Cadillac CTS
2007	Toyota Camry
2006	Honda Civic
2005	Chrysler 300
2004	Toyota Prius
2003	Infiniti G35
2002	Ford Thunderbird
2001	Chrysler PT Cruiser
2000	Lincoln LS
1999	Chrysler 300M
1998	Chevrolet Corvette
1997	Chevrolet Malibu
1996	Dodge Caravan
1995	Chrysler Cirrus
1994	Ford Mustang
1993	Ford Probe GT
1992	Cadillac Seville Touring Sedan (STS)
1991	Chevrolet Caprice Classic LTZ
1990	Lincoln Town Car
1989	Ford Thunderbird Super Coupe
1988	Pontiac Grand Prix
1987	Ford Thunderbird Turbo Coupe
1986	Ford Taurus LX
1985	Volkswagen GTI (built at Volkswagen's Pennsylvania plant)
1984	Chevrolet Corvette
1983	Renault Alliance (built at AMC's Wisconsin plant)
1982	Chevrolet Camaro Z28
1981	Chrysler K Cars (Dodge Aries / Plymouth Reliant)
1980	Chevrolet Citation
1979	Buick Riviera S
1978	Dodge Omni / Plymouth Horizon
1977	Chevrolet Caprice
1976	Dodge Aspen / Plymouth Volaré
1975	Chevrolet Monza 2+2
1974	Ford Mustang
1973	Chevrolet Monte Carlo
1972	Citroën SM (imported vehicle, selected "Overall Car of the Year")
1971	Chevrolet Vega
1970	Ford Torino
1969	Plymouth Road Runner
1968	Pontiac GTO
1967	Mercury Cougar
1966	Oldsmobile Toronado
1965	Pontiac Motor Division
1964	Ford Motor Company
1963	American Motors (AMC) Rambler (all models; American, Classic, Ambassador)
1962	Buick Special
1961	Pontiac Tempest
1960	Chevrolet Corvair
1959	Pontiac Motor Division
1958	Ford Thunderbird
1957	Chrysler Corporation (Plymouth, Dodge, DeSoto, Chrysler, Imperial)
1956	Ford Motor Company
1955	Chevrolet Motor Division
1954	No Award
1953	No Award
1952	Cadillac Motor Division
1951	Chrysler Corporation
1950	No Award
1949	Cadillac Motor Division

== Import Car of the Year Winners ==
Introduced in 1970 for one year and then brought back in 1976 due to differences between imports and American cars. The award was discontinued after the 1999 model year when the difference between what was a domestic and an import had started to become problematic.

Year	Winner
1999	Volkswagen New Beetle
1998	Lexus GS
1997	BMW 5-Series
1996	Mercedes-Benz E-Class
1995	Nissan Maxima
1994	Honda Accord (imported nameplate, locally built at Honda's Marysville Auto Plant)
1993	Mazda RX-7
1992	Lexus SC 400
1991	Mitsubishi 3000GT VR-4
1990	Nissan 300ZX Turbo
1989	Mitsubishi Galant GS
1988	Honda CR-X Si
1987	Acura Legend Coupe
1986	Mazda RX-7
1985	Toyota MR2
1984	Honda Civic CR-X
1983	Mazda 626
1982	Toyota Celica Supra
1981	Mercedes-Benz 300SD Turbodiesel
1980	Honda Civic
1979	Datsun 280ZX
1978	Toyota Celica
1977	Mercedes-Benz 280E
1976	Toyota Celica Liftback
1975	No Award
1974	No Award
1973	No Award
1972	No Award
1971	No Award
1970	Porsche 914

== Truck of the Year Winners ==
Year	Winner
2026	Ford Maverick
2025	Ram 1500
2024	Chevrolet Colorado
2023	Ford F-150 Lightning
2022	Rivian R1T
2021	Ram 1500 TRX
2020	Ram Heavy Duty
2019	Ram 1500
2018	Ford F-150 / F-150 Raptor
2017	Ford Super Duty
2016	Chevrolet Colorado Duramax Diesel
2015	Chevrolet Colorado
2014	Ram 1500 EcoDiesel
2013	Ram 1500
2012	Ford F-150
2011	Chevrolet Silverado Heavy Duty
2010	Ram Heavy Duty
2009	Ford F-150
2008	Toyota Tundra
2007	Chevrolet Silverado
2006	Honda Ridgeline
2005	Toyota Tacoma
2004	Ford F-150
2003	Dodge Ram Heavy Duty
2002	Chevrolet Avalanche
2001	Chevrolet Silverado Heavy Duty
2000	Toyota Tundra
1999	Chevrolet Silverado
1998	Mercedes-Benz ML320
1997	Ford F-150
1996	Chevrolet Tahoe
1995	Chevrolet Blazer
1994	Dodge Ram
1993	Jeep Grand Cherokee
1992	Ford Econoline / Club Wagon
1991	Mazda Navajo
1990	Ford Aerostar 4WD
1989	Toyota Pickup XtraCab SR5 V6
1988	No Award
1987	No Award
1986	No Award
1985	No Award
1984	No Award
1983	No Award
1982	No Award
1981	No Award
1980	Volkswagen Vanagon
1979	Chevrolet LUV
1978	Ford Econoline

== SUV of the Year Winners ==
"SUV of the Year" was split from "Truck of the Year" in 1999.

Year	Winner
2027	Rivian R2
2026	Cadillac Escalade IQ
2025	Lincoln Nautilus
2024	Chevrolet Blazer EV
2023	Hyundai Ioniq 5
2022	Genesis GV70
2021	Land Rover Defender 110
2020	Kia Telluride
2019	Jeep Wrangler / Wrangler Unlimited
2018	Honda CR-V
2017	Mercedes Benz GLC-Class
2016	Volvo XC90
2015	Honda CR-V
2014	Subaru Forester
2013	Mercedes-Benz GL
2012	Land Rover Range Rover Evoque
2011	Porsche Cayenne
2010	Subaru Outback
2009	Subaru Forester
2008	Mazda CX-9
2007	Mercedes-Benz GL-Class
2006	Nissan Xterra
2005	Land Rover LR3
2004	Volkswagen Touareg
2003	Volvo XC90
2002	GMC Envoy
2001	Acura MDX
2000	Nissan Xterra
1999	Lexus RX 300

== Performance Vehicle of the Year Winners ==
Motor Trend began their Performance Vehicle of the Year award in 2022. In 2025, Motor Trend discontinued the Performance Vehicle of the Year Award.

Year	Winner
2024	BMW M2
2023	Chevrolet Corvette Z06
2022	Porsche 911 GT3

== Car of the Year (China) ==
Motor Trend magazine's China-market cousin, Auto Club-Motor Trend, also issues a "Car of the Year" award for that market.

=== Car of the Year ===
2011: BMW Brilliance 5 Series (long wheelbase)
2010: Shanghai-GM Buick Regal
2009: GAC-Honda Accord
2008: FAW-Volkswagen Magotan(Passat B6)
2007: GAC-Toyota Camry
2006: FAW-Toyota Crown
2005: Changan-Ford Mondeo
2004: FAW-Mazda 6
2003: Shanghai Volkswagen Polo

=== SUV of the Year Winners ===
2011: FAW-Volkswagen Audi Q5
2010: GAC Toyota Highlander
2009: Dongfeng Nissan X-Trail
2008: Guangqi Honda CRV
2007: Countermanded
2006: Shanghai GM SRX
2005: Guangqi Honda CRV
2004: Changfeng Automobile Liebao Feiteng

== See also ==
- List of motor vehicle awards
