= Hudson Greater Eight =

Large-sized luxury cars produced 1931 and 1932 by Hudson Motor Company

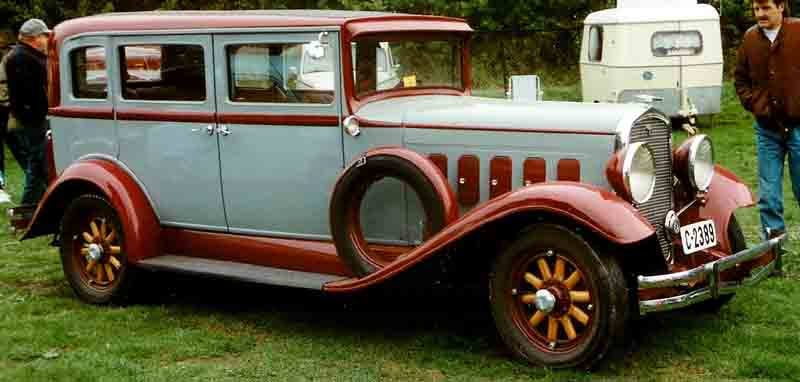

Overview
- Manufacturer: Hudson Motor Car Company
- Production: 1931–32
- Assembly: Detroit, Michigan, United States
- Designer: Frank S. Spring

Body and chassis
- Class: Full-size
- Body style: 2-door coupe 4-door sedan Roadster
- Layout: FR layout

Powertrain
- Engine: 1931: 233.7 cu in (3.8 L) I8; 1932: 254 cu in (4.2 L) I8
- Transmission: 3-speed manual

Dimensions
- Wheelbase: 119 in (3,023 mm); 126 in (3,200 mm); 132 in (3,353 mm)

Chronology
- Predecessor: Great Eight
- Successor: Hudson Pacemaker Standard 8

The Hudson Greater Eight is a luxury car produced by the Hudson Motor Car Company of Detroit, Michigan, during 1931 and 1932.

== History ==
The Hudson Motor Car Company, headed by Roy D. Chapin, developed a reputation and success in the automobile marketplace by building solid cars with good performance and reliability for the money. The introduction of the Essex Six in 1924, targeting budget-minded buyers, increased the combined sales of Hudson Motors from seventh to third place in the U.S. automobile market by 1925. Production of Hudson and Essex cars continued to hold third place for 1927, fourth place in 1928, and returned to capture third in 1929 with a total of 300,962 units.

The automaker decided to move upmarket and, in 1930, launched a line of cars named Great Eight. The line included "semi-custom" bodies built by the Walter M. Murphy Company. Hudson Eights were "often luxurious, and usually smooth, effortless performers" powered by a new for 1930 straight-eight engine that was produced by the automaker through 1952. Total production in 1930 for Hudson Motors fell by almost 40% to 113,898 units.

For 1931, the automaker renamed the line to Hudson Greater Eight – implying that the new models "were even better than" the previous year because of additional engineering and styling advances. However, production declined even further, dropping Hudson from the top eight car brands sales in the U.S. market.

Hudson hired its first professional designer in early 1931, Frank S. Spring, with the title of "engineering stylist". This was a time when stylists were not prevalent in the industry, and "body engineers applied whatever untrained styling touches they could muster." The automaker first incorporated Spring's designs on the 1932 model year Hudsons.

Spring was an enthusiast of sports cars, but Hudson's president, A. E. Barit, insisted on high rooflines. Nevertheless, Spring became best known for his contributions to the 1948–54 "Step-Down" design (third-generation Hudson Commodores and first-generation Hudson Hornets). Spring remained with the company until its merger with Nash, forming American Motors Corporation (AMC) in 1954.

== Annual designs ==
=== 1931 ===
The Greater Eight models were built on Hudson's 119-inch (3,023 mm) or 126-inch (3,200 mm) wheelbase lengths with many body styles. The "T-Series" chassis riding on solid front and rear axles with semi-elliptic leaf springs and four-wheel mechanical brakes. The 1931 models featured a 233.7 cu in (3.8 L) cast iron L-head inline eight-cylinder (I8) engine producing 87 brake horsepower (65 kW) mated to a three-speed sliding gear manual transmission.

The Greater Eight received Hudson's first attempts incorporating softer, less rigid styling. The Greater Eight offered many stylish attributes that included a distinctive fine mesh grille-work that set it apart from other contemporary marques. It came with full instrumentation. Standard features included adjustable seats in front and rear as well as a steering column that could be lowered or raised to suit driver's preferences.

Hudson made only a few boat-tailed roadster models. The bodies were built by Murray, and even though the style never made the sales literature, a 1931 Hudson Greater Eight boat-tailed roadster was built, making it the only time this style appeared on a Hudson chassis.

Even with their larger engines and lower prices than the 1930 models, sales during the Great Depression in the United States were down from the previous year. Sales of the Greater Eight totaled 22,250 for 1931.

=== 1932 ===
For 1932, the Greater Eights received new, more streamlined styling, including a greater slope of the windshield. Hudson's engineering stylist, Frank S. Spring, made the fenders more graceful and gave the car's body gentler curves. The 1932 models featured a prominent Vee'd grille with vertical chrome theme. The cars were recognizable by their uniquely styled rounded-triangle shaped headlights and parking lights, which mimicked the shape of Hudson's triangle logo. The interior also repeated the triangle theme, including the driver's floor pedals.

Three wheelbase lengths were available with 14 different designs. Body choices for the 119 in (3,023 mm) versions included Standard Sedan, Coach, Rumble Coupe, Two-passenger Coupe, Town Sedan, Special Coupe, and Convertible Coupe. Only the Suburban and Special Sedan came on the 126 in (3,200 mm) wheelbase. The 132 in (3,353 mm) version offered Brougham, Touring Sedan, Club Sedan, Seven-passenger Sedan, and Seven-passenger Phaeton body designs.

The new design also received mechanical upgrades, including 30% larger brakes than those on the previous models. The I8 engine was also increased to 254 cu in (4.2 L) and produced 101 brake horsepower (75 kW). Options included a freewheeling clutch to disengage the driveline, as well as a selective-control automatic clutch.

Economic conditions were not improving and sales for 1932 totaled less than 8,000 Greater Eights, despite prices remaining the same and the addition of two "lush" new series to the product offer: the Sterling (Series U on a 126-inch (3,200 mm) chassis and the Major (Series L with a 132-inch (3,353 mm) wheelbase). Total production for both Hudson and Essex moved up to 57,550 during 1932, the lowest point for the U.S. automotive industry during the Great Depression.

== Epilogue ==
For 1933, the Hudson Eights were four "standard" models riding on a 119-inch (3,023 mm) wheelbase and five luxurious Major series models built on a 132-inch (3,353 mm) platform. The line was renamed the Hudson Pacemaker Standard Eight.

The company was struggling because of low sales and mounting financial losses. In May 1933, Roy D. Chapin returned to Hudson after serving as the United States Secretary of Commerce during the last months of President Herbert Hoover's administration and spent his final three years of life trying to save the automaker from the effects of the Great Depression. Hudson had fared poorly during the Great Depression (1929–36) compared with other domestic automakers with its rank falling back from third to eight in terms of production.

During the 1930s, automobile production by the Big Three (General Motors, Ford, and Chrysler) increased, while all the other domestic automakers were damaged and saw their total market share drop from 25% in 1929 to 10% by 1939. with many of the premium-type brands disappearing, such as Cord, Durant, Franklin, Peerless, Pierce-Arrow, and Stutz.
