= Joe Oros =

Joseph E. Oros Jr. (Romanian: Oroș; June 15, 1916, in Cleveland, Ohio – August 2, 2012) was an automobile stylist for Ford Motor Company over a period of 21 years — known as the Chief Designer of the team at Ford that styled the original Mustang, and for his contributions to the 1955 Ford Thunderbird. Oros was also an artist, sculptor, painter and industrial designer, having designed appliances and other products.

Oros was born to non-English speaking Romanian parents, originating in Transylvania. He was moved up a grade from 3rd to 5th because of his fantastic art work even though his math and science skills were questionable.

Oros died on August 2, 2012, at the age of 96. He lived in Santa Barbara, California with his wife Betty Thatcher Oros, the first female automotive designer, until her death in 2001. His house was full of his own artwork, including paintings and sculptures. Oros was working on a 3D model of the Earth depicting all the original settlers. In 2009, it was about one-quarter complete.

== Education and career ==
Oros graduated at the top of his class from the Cleveland Institute of Art in 1939 — having studied under Viktor Schreckengost — and later became a student at General Motors' School of Automotive Design, where he worked under Harley Earl's guidance, including a period of time with Cadillac. At GM, he met classmates Elwood Engel, later design chief at Chrysler Corporation and George W. Walker, later vice president of design at Ford Motor Company. After serving in World War II, Oros went to work for Walker's industrial design firm. He also recommended hiring there of his close friend Engel. Walker and Oros worked on designing Nash automobiles until 1947, when Walker's firm won a contract with Ford. Together, they worked on the design of the 1949 Ford, a design Oros described as inspired by an airplane. When Walker later became head of Ford design in 1955, Oros joined Walker and Engel there. Oros worked primarily on the designs for Ford's cars and trucks, while Engel worked on Lincoln and Mercury.

Oros received a Medallion Award from the Industrial Designers Institute (IDI) (now the Industrial Designers Society of America) along with George W. Walker, Eugene Bordinat, Herbert Tod, Rulo N. Conrad, John Najjar, and Elwood P. Engel, for the 1956 Lincoln Premier hard-top — as well as an IDI Bronze Medal in 1964 along with Eugene Bordinat, L. David Ash, G. L. Halderman, Charles H. Phaneuf, D.C. Woods, J. Najjar, and J.B. Foster for their contributions to the Mustang.

Oros rose to director of exterior design and had oversight for many Ford vehicle projects. In 1958, Oros did the primary design work on the new, four-seat Ford Thunderbird that was to debut in the 1958 model year. It beat out a competing design by Engel (which later became the iconic 1961 Lincoln Continental). Although delays caused the revised Thunderbird to arrive in dealerships three months late, it was a huge sales success. The 1958 Thunderbird outsold the old two-seat model 2-to-1, and was named Motor Trend's Car of the Year. The body style was continued through 1960.

== Ford Mustang ==
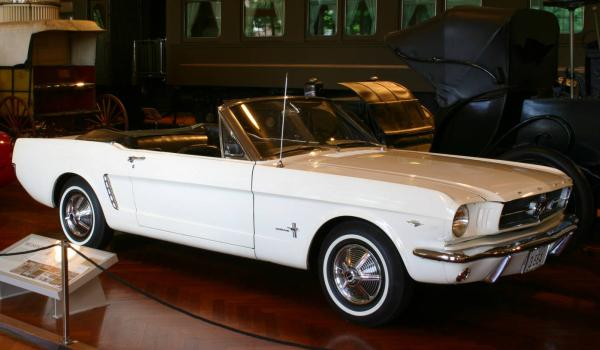
1964/65 Mustang

As Lee Iacocca's assistant general manager and chief engineer, Donald N. Frey, was the head engineer for the Mustang project — supervising the development of the Mustang in a record 18 months — while Iacocca championed the project as Ford Division general manager. The Mustang prototype had been a two-seat, mid-mounted engine roadster, later remodeled as a four-seat car styled under the direction of Project Design Chief Joe Oros and his team of L. David Ash, Gale Halderman, and John Foster in Ford's Lincoln–Mercury Division design studios, which produced the winning design in an intramural design contest instigated by Iacocca. Ash's styling exercise, originally internally named the Cougar, was the winning styling exercise.

Having set the design standards for the Mustang, Oros said:

I told the team that I wanted the car to appeal to women, but I wanted men to desire it, too," he said. "I wanted a Ferrari-like front end, the motif centered on the front — something heavy-looking like a Maserati, but, please, not a Trident — and I wanted air intakes on the side to cool the rear brakes. I said it should be as sporty as possible and look like it was related to European design.

Retelling the story of designing the car, Oros said:

I then called a meeting with all the Ford studio designers. We talked about the sporty car for most of that afternoon, setting parameters for what it should look like — and what it should not look like — by making lists on a large pad, a technique I adapted from the management seminar. We taped the lists up all around the studio to keep ourselves on track. We also had photographs of all the previous sporty cars that had been done in the Corporate Advanced studio as a guide to themes or ideas that were tired or not acceptable to management. Within a week we had hammered out a new design. We cut templates and fitted them to the clay model that had been started. We cut right into it, adding or deleting clay to accommodate our new theme, so it wasn't like starting all over. But we knew Lincoln-Mercury would have two models. And Advanced would have five, some they had previously shown and modified, plus a couple extras. But we would only have one model because Ford studio had a production schedule for a good many facelifts and other projects. We couldn't afford the manpower, but we made up for lost time by working around the clock so our model would be ready for the management review.

Approval Day: "Ours was quite unique and it took the whole ball game" said Oros. "It was a unanimous decision to accept the car we had prepared. They approved everything on our car — no criticisms." Henry II was totally sold on the Oros team design, and Iacocca was just happy he was finally going to have a car. "I was not in the courtyard at the approval moment, nor was any other chief of a studio there," noted Oros. Henry Ford II walked over later and told Oros, "Joe, you know we’ve approved your car but you’re $15 over the hill on it." Oros said he understood and would find a way to get the money back out of it. The product planners had an established budget and sales band on each car. So the Mustang estimated production cost had to be met or it wouldn't be profitable. Henry II then wandered over to the seating buck, a mockup of the Mustang interior, and tried out the rear seat. "He was a big man sitting in the rear seat," said Oros. "He said, ‘Joe, I believe that we need a little more headroom.’ He swung back and hit his head. "I said, ‘Yes, sir, we can do that.’ And he said, ‘Can you do that without losing the design?’ and I said, ‘Yes, sir, we’ll do that,’ and that was it. It worked." You didn't want to say no to the guy with his name on the building, according to Oros.

In 2009, at the celebration of the Mustang's 45th anniversary of, Oros, then 92, said:

We were told to design a car that the ladies would love that the men would love just as much, and that’s exactly what we did ... It makes me feel proud every time I see one. After all of these years, Mustang has never lost its luster.

== Retirement ==
Upon his retirement in 1975, Joe Oros and his wife, Betty Oros, moved to Santa Barbara, California, became very active in the Romanian-American community in Southern California, serving for a few years (1988–1991) as the chairman of the New Holy Trinity Romanian Orthodox Church and Cultural center in Los Angeles.

== See also ==
- Ford Mustang
- See Also: Photo of Joe Oros
- Betty Thatcher Oros
