= Elwood Engel =

American automotive designer (1917-1986)

Elwood Paul Engel (February 10, 1917 – June 24, 1986) was an American automotive designer who served as the Chrysler's chief designer from 1961 to 1974.

== Early days ==
Engel first joined General Motors as a student under Harley Earl's watchful eye at GM's school of design. In 1939 he met classmates Joe Oros and George W. Walker at the school. During World War II, Engel served four years in the U.S. Army as a mapmaker, in both the European and Pacific theaters of operation. He and Oros remained in touch throughout the war, and after the war when Oros took a position in Walker's design firm, he recommended that Engel be hired as well. Although Walker's firm had Nash as an account, Engel worked on designs for farm equipment, women's shoes and household appliances. However, when Walker obtained a contract with Ford Motor Company in 1947 (and dumped Nash), Engel and Oros went to work full-time designing automobiles. Engel and Oros were such close friends that Oros was best man when Engel was wedded to Marguerite Imboden. While Oros worked under Walker on Ford car and truck designs, Engel concentrated on Lincoln and Mercury vehicles.

== Ford ==
When Walker became Ford's vice president for design in 1955, he made Engel and Oros his lieutenants. The trio was responsible for most of the ever-increasing sizes of Ford's late 1950s models, and their ornate chrome adornments.

Engel and Oros came up with competing designs for the 1961 Thunderbird. Oros's four-seater design was ultimately chosen. Engel's team was instructed by Ford President Robert S. McNamara to add two more doors and two more seats to their roadster design - and that became the basis for the 1961 Lincoln Continental. McNamara had considered terminating the Lincoln brand, along with the Edsel, after the 1960 model year. The Continental, however, convinced him to keep the line going, and it became such a success it was credited with saving the brand. Engel also scaled down the Ford Thunderbird and turned it into a four-seater to create the 1959 Ford Anglia 105E, a popular saloon in Britain.

== Chrysler ==
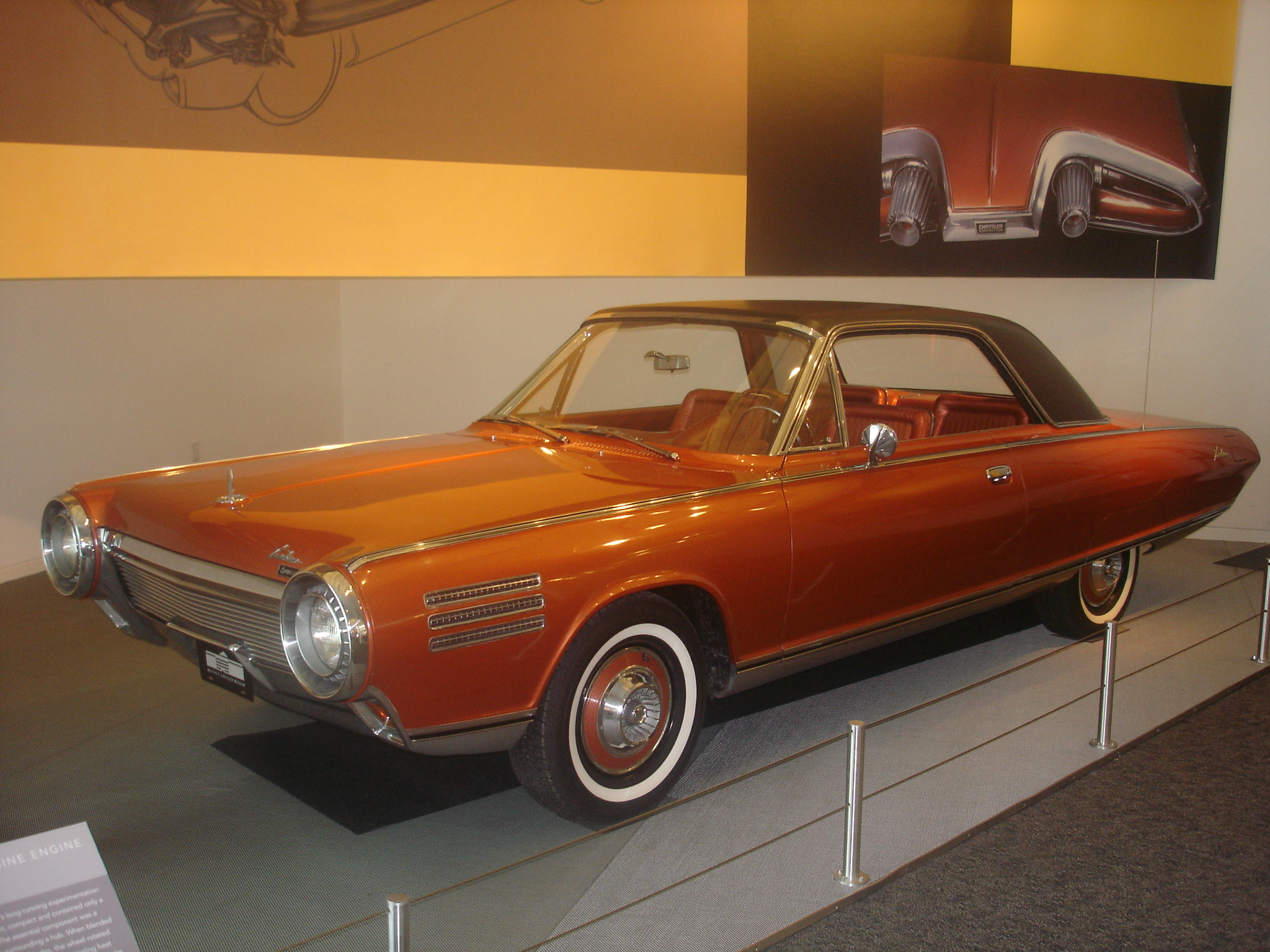
Chrysler Turbine

In 1961 Walker retired from Ford at age 65. When Eugene Bordinat, not Engel, was chosen as his replacement, the well-connected Walker helped orchestrate Engel's move to Chrysler in November 1961.

At Chrysler, Engel replaced chief stylist Virgil Exner, who had designed the successful "Forward Look" models of the latter 1950s. Exner was responsible for the era of large tail fins; Engel was credited with replacing fins with a slab-sided look, reminiscent of his Lincoln Continental design.

Engel generally delegated the majority of work to his design teams; he then would fine-tune the clay models with his touches. Co-workers said he had an uncanny eye for the "commercial viability" of designs.

Engel oversaw the design and development of the 1963 Turbine car, of which 55 were manufactured and 50 of them road tested until 1966. The two-door model was said to strongly resemble his original two-door design for the 1961 Thunderbird. Although most of Chrysler's legendary "Muscle Cars" were credited to specific designers, Engel oversaw, worked on, and approved all of them.

== Retirement and death ==
Engel retired in 1973 but stayed on at Chrysler as a consultant until 1974.

Engel died of cancer on June 24, 1986.
