= Hudson =

Hudson may refer to:

== People ==
- Hudson (given name)
- Hudson (surname)

== Places ==
=== Argentina ===
- Hudson, Buenos Aires Province, a town in Berazategui Partido

=== Australia ===
- Hudson, Queensland, a locality in the Cassowardy Coast Region

=== Canada ===
- Hudson, Ontario
- Hudson, Quebec
- Hudson, Edmonton, Alberta

=== United States ===
- Hudson, Colorado, a town in Weld County
- Hudson, Florida, a census-designated place in Pasco County
- Hudson, Illinois, a town in McLean County
- Hudson, Indiana, a town in Steuben County
- Hudson, Iowa, a town in Black Hawk County
- Hudson, Kansas, a town in Stafford County
- Hudson, Maine, a town in Penobscot County
- Hudson, Massachusetts, a town in Middlesex County
  - Hudson (CDP), Massachusetts, the main village in the town
- Hudson, Michigan, a town in Lenawee County
- Hudson, Missouri, an unincorporated community
- Hudson, New Hampshire, a town in Hillsborough County
  - Hudson (CDP), New Hampshire, the urban part of the town
- Hudson City, New Jersey, a former city, now part of Jersey City
- Hudson, New York, a city in Columbia County
- Hudson, North Carolina, a town in Caldwell County
- Hudson, Ohio, a city in Summit County
- Hudson, Pennsylvania, part of Plains Township
- Hudson, South Dakota, a town in Lincoln County
- Hudson, Texas, a city in Angelina County
- Hudson (town), Wisconsin, in St. Croix County
  - Hudson, Wisconsin, a city in the town
- Hudson, Wyoming, a town in Fremont County
- Hudson County, New Jersey
- Hudson Square, Manhattan, a neighborhood in New York City
- Hudson Township (disambiguation)

== Geographical features ==
- Hudson Bay, in northeastern Canada
- Hudson Gardens, in Littleton, Colorado, US
- Hudson Island (or Coolah Island), the southernmost island of the Family Islands group, east of Tully Heads
- Hudson River, a river mainly in New York State, US
  - Hudson Valley, a river valley formed by the Hudson River
- Hudson Strait, connecting Hudson Bay to the Atlantic Ocean in Canada
- Mount Hudson, a volcano in Chile

== Arts and entertainment ==
- Hudson Brothers, a 1965 American music group who early on released some material as Hudson
- Hudson (album), a 2017 jazz album by Jack DeJohnette, John Medeski, John Scofield, and Larry Grenadier
- Hudson City, a setting in the Dark Champions game, and the title of a spin-off book

== Brands and enterprises ==
- Hudson Boatworks, a racing shell manufacturer in London, Ontario (1981 to present)
- Hudson Foods Company of Rogers, Arkansas
- Hudson Group, a retail newspaper stand company
- Hudson Soft, a former Japanese video game publisher and developer
- Hudson's, a defunct Detroit-based department store chain
- Robert Hudson (company), a defunct locomotive manufacturer

== Computing ==
- Hudson (software), a continuous integration tool
- Fusion controller hub (FCH) chipset on AMD motherboards (codename "Hudson")

== Military and Coast Guard ==
- Lockheed Hudson, a World War II light bomber and coastal reconnaissance aircraft
- USS Hudson (DD-475), a US Navy destroyer (1943–1946)
- USRC Hudson (1893), a U.S. Revenue Service cutter from the Battle of Cárdenas
- CCGS Hudson, a 1963 Canadian Coast Guard research vessel

== Transport ==
=== Automotive ===
- Hudson (steam automobile) (1901–1902)
- Hudson Motor Car Company, 1909, (merged in 1954 with American Motors)
  - Hudson Super Six, an automobile (1916-1926, 1933, 1940-1950)
  - Hudson Greater Eight, a line of automobiles (1931–1932)
  - Hudson Utility Coupe, an automobile (1937–1942)
  - Hudson Commodore, an automobile (1941–1952)
  - Hudson Hornet, an automobile (1951–1954)
  - Hudson Wasp, an automobile (1952–1954)
  - Hudson Jet, a compact automobile (1953–1954)
  - Hudson Italia, a two-door compact coupé (1954–1955)
- Henry Hudson Bridge, New York City

=== Railroad-related ===
- Hudson station (RTM), an 1800s commuter rail station in Hudson, Quebec, Canada
- Hudson station (New York), an 1874 train station in Hudson, New York
- Hudson, the generic name in most of North America for any steam locomotive with an 1896 4-6-4 wheel arrangement
- NYC Hudson, a class of locomotives used by New York Central in the 1930s
- Royal Hudson, a type of locomotive used by Canadian Pacific Railway 1937–1960
- 4-6-4, a wheel arrangement applied to some North American steam locomotives

=== Ships ===
- SS Hudson, several steamships

== Other uses ==
- Hudson Institute, an American conservative think tank
- Hudson Project, a powerline supplying New York City
- Hudson v. McMillian, a US Supreme Court decision concerning treatment of prisoners
- Hudson Valley Renegades, an American minor league baseball team
