= Hubbard House =

Hubbard House may refer to:

- Hubbard House (Jacksonville, Florida), domestic violence shelter
- Hubbard House (Crescent City, Florida), historic building
- Hubbard House (Hudson, Illinois), historic building
- Hubbard House (Brooklyn, New York), historic building
- Hubbard House (Mankato, Minnesota), historic building

== See also ==
- Hubbard-Upson House, Sacramento, California, listed on the National Register of Historic Places (NRHP) in Sacramento County, California
- John Hubbard House, Lakeville, Connecticut, a contributing building in Lakeville Historic District
- Coite-Hubbard House, Middletown, Connecticut, NRHP-listed
- Nehemiah Hubbard House, Middletown, Connecticut, NRHP-listed
- Joel H. Hubbard House, St. Charles, Illinois, listed on the NRHP in Kane County, Illinois
- Hubbard-Dawson House, Holden, Massachusetts, NRHP-listed
- Hill Cemetery and Parson Hubbard House Historic District, Shelburne, Massachusetts, NRHP-listed
- Paddock-Hubbard House, Concord, Michigan, listed on the NRHP in Jackson County, Michigan
- Hubbard-Kesby House, Milford, Michigan, listed on the NRHP in Oakland County, Michigan
- Thomas Russell Hubbard House, Manchester, New Hampshire, listed on the NRHP in Hillsborough County, New Hampshire
- Hubbard Hall (Elizabethtown, New York), NRHP-listed
- Chase-Hubbard-Williams House, Lockport, New York, NRHP-listed
- Benjamin Hubbard House, Moravian Falls, North Carolina, listed on the NRHP in Wilkes County, North Carolina
- Johnson-Hubbard House, Wilkesboro, North Carolina, listed on the NRHP in Wilkes County, North Carolina
- Col. William Hubbard House, Ashtabula, Ohio, listed on the NRHP in Ashtabula County, Ohio
- Hubbard House Underground Railroad Museum, Ashtabula, Ohio, one of Ohio's museums
- Lester Hubbard House, Sandusky, Ohio, listed on the NRHP in Erie County, Ohio
- S. B. Hubbard House, Sandusky, Ohio, listed on the NRHP in Erie County, Ohio
- William and Mabel Donahoo Hubbard House, Grandfield, Oklahoma, listed on the NRHP in Tillman County, Oklahoma
- Hubbard House (Nashville, Tennessee), listed on the NRHP in Davidson County, Tennessee
- Hubbard-Trigg House, Bastrop, Texas, listed on the NRHP in Bastrop County, Texas
- Hubbard Bungalow, Centralia, Washington, listed on the NRHP in Lewis County, Washington
- Hubbard House (Washington, D.C.)
