= Hudson Township, Michigan =

Hudson Township is the name of some places in the U.S. state of Michigan:

- Hudson Township, Charlevoix County, Michigan
- Hudson Township, Lenawee County, Michigan
- Hudson Township, Mackinac County, Michigan

== See also ==
- Hudson, a city in Lenawee County
- Hudson Township (disambiguation)
