= Hudson station =

Hudson station may refer to:

- Hudson station (New York), a train station in Hudson, New York, United States
- Hudson station (Exo), a commuter rail station Hudson, Quebec, Canada

== See also ==
- Hudson Bay station, a railway station in Hudson Bay, Saskatchewan, Canada
- Hudson Generating Station, a power plant in Jersey City, New Jersey, United States
- Hudson Lake station, a train stop in Hudson Lake, Indiana, United States
- Hudson (disambiguation)
