= Kate Hudson (disambiguation) =

Kate Hudson is an American actress and singer.

Kate Hudson may also refer to:

- Kate Hudson (activist), British academic and political activist

== See also ==
- Katy Hudson (born 1984), American pop singer, known as Katy Perry
  - Katy Hudson (album), 2001 eponymously named debut album
- Kathryn Hudson (born 1949), British politician
- Hudson (disambiguation)
