= Hudson Utility Coupe =

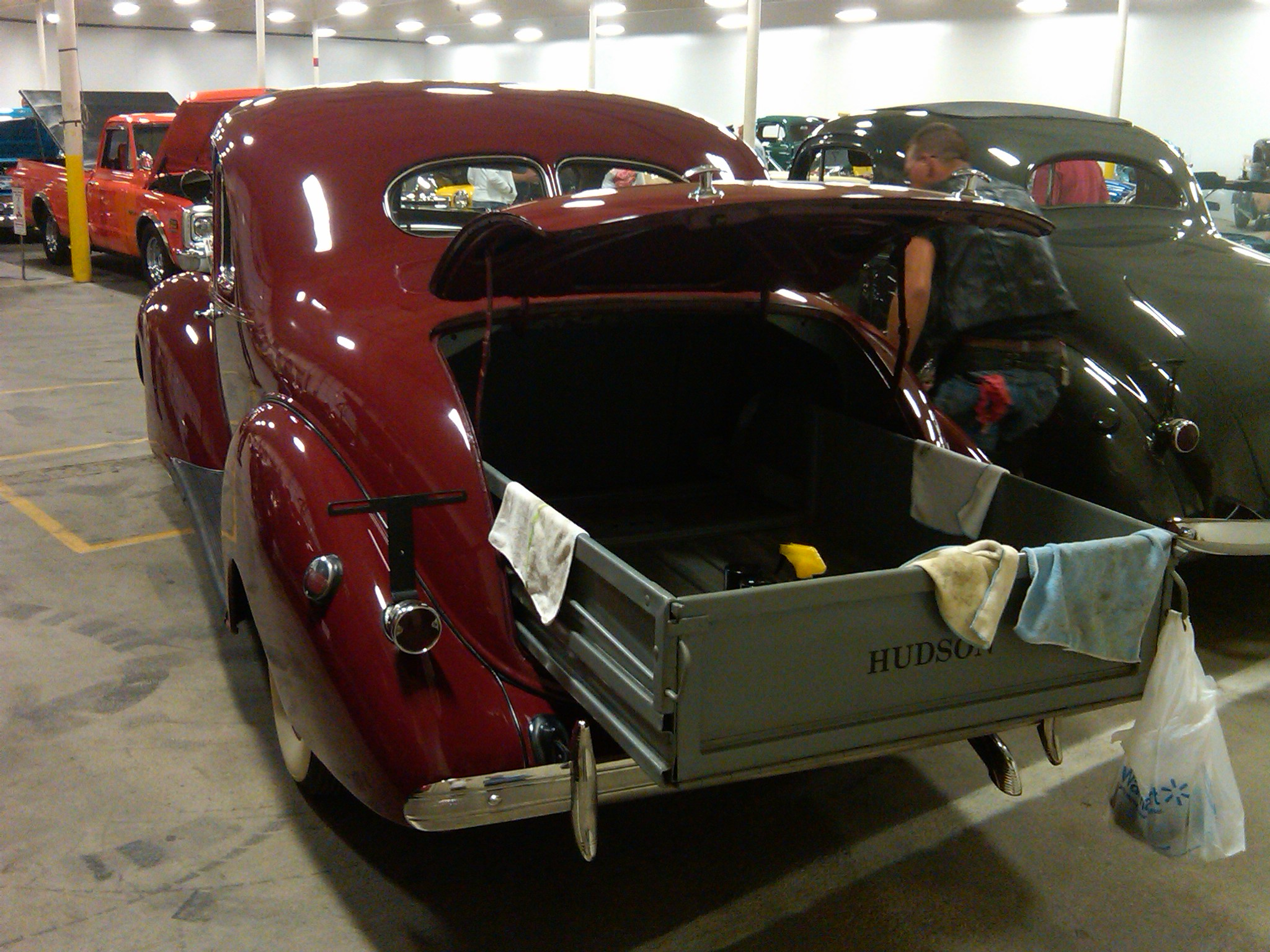
- Hudson Utility Coupe

Overview
- Manufacturer: Hudson Motor Car Company
- Production: 1937 – 1942
- Assembly: Detroit, Michigan, United States

Body and chassis
- Class: Full-size
- Body style: 2-door coupe
- Layout: FR layout

Powertrain
- Engine: 212 cu in (3.5 L) I6
- Transmission: 3-speed manual

Dimensions
- Wheelbase: 117 in (2,972 mm)
- Curb weight: 2,855 lb (1,295 kg)

Terraplane emblem

The Hudson Utility Coupe (initially sold as the "Hudson Terraplane Utility Coupe" for 1937 and 1938) is an automobile that was manufactured by the Hudson Motor Car Company of Detroit, Michigan, between 1937 and 1942.

== Production history ==
In 1937 (the first year of production), the automobile was known as the Hudson Terraplane Utility Coupe. It was one of 17 different models in the Terraplane line (nine in the "Deluxe"/Series 71 line and eight in the "Super Terraplane"/Series 72).

For only the 1938 model year, the trucks then became Hudson-Terraplanes.

For the 1939 model year, the Terraplane brand was dropped for both trucks and autos, and the vehicle was called the Hudson Utility Coupe for the rest of its production cycle.

The manufacturing of civilian automobiles was discontinued from 1942 to 1945 (so all production could be dedicated to the war effort) and Hudson did not resume making the utility coupe after the war ended.

== Features ==
The three-passenger coupe utility model was unusual. It was different from a regular coupe because it could be used either as a car or a truck. The Hudson Utility Coupe had a 212 cu in (3.5 L) L-head straight-six engine, rated at 96 horsepower, giving the Hudson Terraplane Utility coupe the most power of its class, for that time. Not only did the utility coupe have power, it also had strength, the complete load capacity being rated for a half ton. The Hudson Utility Coupe had a strong 117-inch (2,972 mm) wheelbase platform.

From 1937 to 1939, the Hudson Utility Coupe used radial safety control suspension with leaf springs front and back. In 1940, Hudson altered the Utility Coupe's suspension system to an independent front suspension with coil springs.

Mounted inside the vehicle's trunk is a 39 by 48 in (991 by 1,219 mm) steel box mounted on sliding rails (similar to the pull-out drawers of toolboxes). The steel box has a chain-supported tailgate. Handles attached to the end of the box can used to slide the box in and out. This roll-out feature provides easy access items deep inside the car's large trunk area. When the box is pulled out, there are two points in which it can latched making the loading and unloading of cargo easy. The ability to pull the box out is what makes the utility coupe capable of being used like a pickup truck as one can also haul much bigger items if the trunk lids was not closed. If there was no need for it in its pickup form, the box slides into the trunk area of the body. Once the trunk was closed the Hudson utility coupe looks like a regular car.

The Hudson Utility Coupe was a business car, especially for salesman who needed to transport their samples. The design allowed the salesman to carry their products regardless of weather conditions. If they were transporting a product that was long, the salesmen were able to slide the cargo box out and let the tailgate down. They could also detach the trunk door for the larger products, if necessary.

== See also ==
- Hudson Commodore top Hudson car line from same era
- Essex early Hudson car
- Hudson Super Six specs for the Hudson Super Six
