= Hudson (given name) =

- Gender: Male

Origin
- Origin: English
- Meaning: "son of Hugh"

Hudson is an English masculine given name which originated from the surname Hudson.

== People with the given name Hudson ==
- Hudson (footballer, born 1986), Hudson Fernando Tobias de Carvalho, Brazilian football right-back
- Hudson (footballer, born 1988), Hudson Rodrigues dos Santos, Brazilian football defensive midfielder
- Hudson (footballer, born 1996), Hudson Felipe Gonçalves, Brazilian football midfielder
- Hudson (footballer, born 2001), Hudson Alexandre Batista da Silva, Brazilian football defensive midfielder
- Hudson Armerding (1918–2009), American educator and historian
- Hudson Austin (1938–2022), Grenadian general
- Hudson Bell, American musician
- Hudson Card (born 2001), American football player
- Hudson Clark (born 2001), American football player
- Hudson Clement, American football player
- Hudson Creighton, Australian rugby union player
- Hudson B. Cox, American lawyer
- Hudson Fasching (born 1995), American ice hockey player
- Hudson Fysh (1895–1974), Australian World War One soldier and co-founder of Qantas Airways
- Hudson Gurney (1775–1864), English writer and politician
- Hudson Haskin (born 1998), American baseball player
- Hudson Head (born 2001), American baseball player
- Hudson Jesus (born 1991), Brazilian footballer
- Hudson Kearley, 1st Viscount Devonport (1856–1934), British politician
- Hudson Leick (born 1969), American actress
- Hudson Lowe (1769–1844), British army general
- Hudson Maxim, American inventor and chemist
- Hudson Meek (2008–2024), American child actor
- Hudson Mohawke (born 1986), the stage name of Scottish electronic music producer Ross Matthew Birchard
- Hudson R. Sours, American lawyer and politician
- Hudson de Souza (born 1977), Brazilian middle distance runner
- Hudson Stuck, Episcopalian Archbishop in Alaska who organized the first expedition to summit Mount McKinley
- Hudson Taylor (disambiguation), multiple people
- Hudson Tuttle (1836–1910), American Spiritualist author and publisher
- Hudson Williams (born 2001), Canadian actor
- Hudson Yang (born 2003), American actor

== Fictional characters ==
- the titular character of Hudson Hawk, a 1991 film starring Bruce Willis
- Doc Hudson, an antropomorphic blue car based on a 1951 Hudson Hornet from the film Cars
- Hudson Gimble, a character from Nickelodeon's TV show Game Shakers, played by Thomas Kuc
- Hudson (gargoyle), in Disney's 1994 Gargoyles series
- Hudson (Aliens), in the 1986 science fiction film Aliens
