= Hubbard House (Illinois) =

Historic house in Illinois, United States

- U.S. National Register of Historic Places
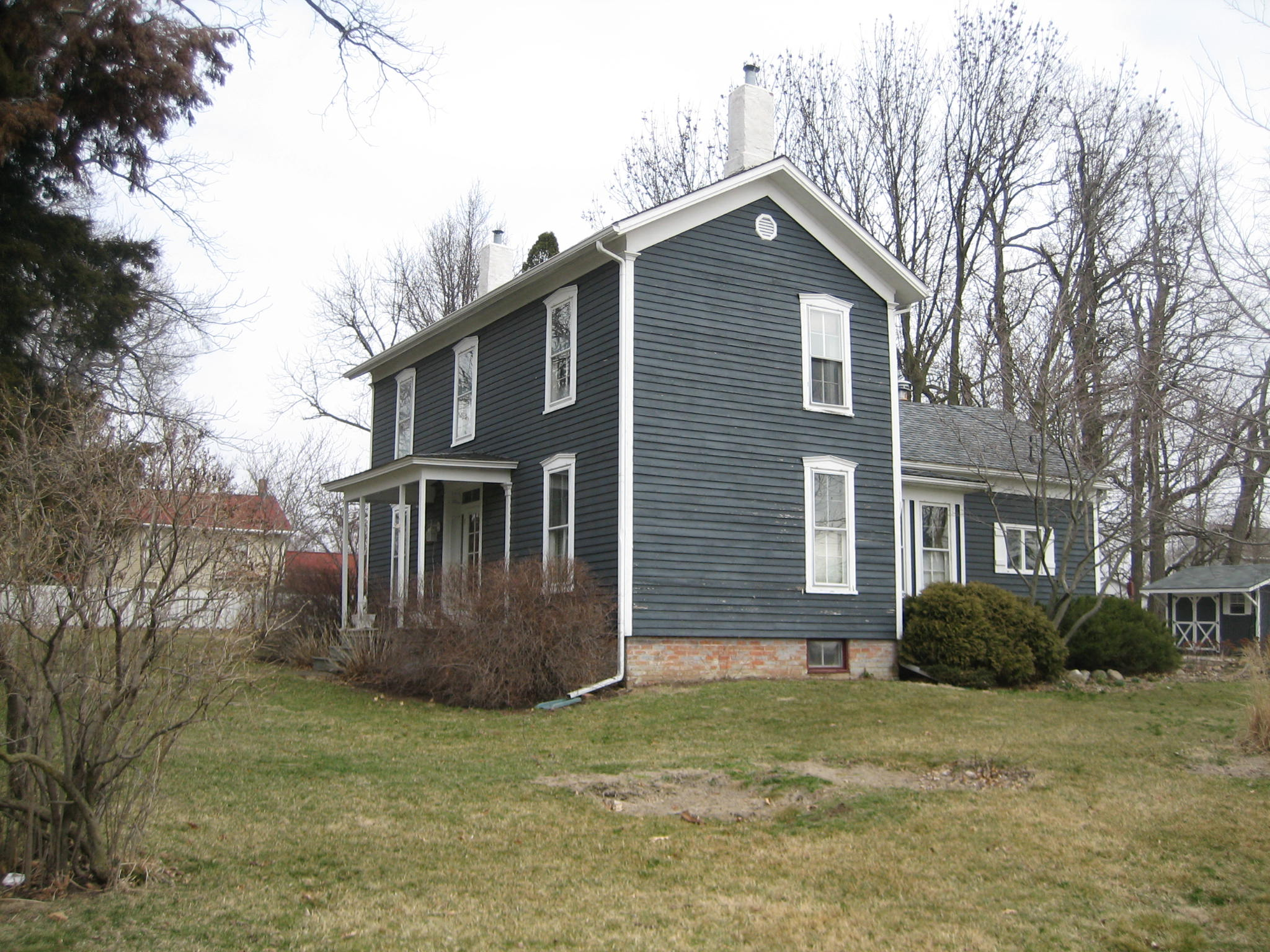

- Location within Illinois Location within the United States
- Location: 310 Broadway, Hudson, Illinois
- Coordinates: 40°36′32″N 88°59′15″W
- Area: less than one acre
- Built: 1857, 1872
- Architect: Silas Hubbard (builder)
- Architectural style: I-house
- NRHP reference No.: 79003163
- Added to NRHP: February 1, 1979

The Hubbard House is a historic home in Hudson, Illinois, one of two houses on the list of United States Registered Historic Places. The other one, located along the same street, was the Gildersleeve House. The Hubbard House is significant as the boyhood home of American writer and philosopher Elbert Hubbard. Hubbard lived in Hudson and attended school there; he stayed in the village until he was 16. The original wing of the house was built in 1857 by a doctor from Buffalo, New York, Silas Hubbard. In 1872 the two-story section of the house was constructed in a typical I-house design. The home has been listed on the National Register of Historic Places since 1979.

== History ==
The east portion of the Hubbard House was constructed in 1857 by Silas Hubbard, a medical doctor who came to McLean County, Illinois, via Buffalo, New York, in 1855. In 1856, Silas Hubbard and Juliana Frances Read had a son, born in Bloomington. Elbert Hubbard would go on to become a major American writer and philosopher.

The Hubbard House was built the year after Elbert was born when the Hubbards moved to Hudson, north of Bloomington. The Hubbards first occupied a farm house on the outskirts of Hudson but were occupying the east portion of the Hubbard House, in town, by the next year. Elbert grew up in the house and attended school in the small village of Hudson. Later on in his life his writing would contain many scenes drawn from his boyhood experiences there. Around 1872, at the age of 16, Elbert Hubbard left Hudson for Buffalo and a job as a partner in a soap company where he earned a "modest fortune". The same year the additional west portion of the house was constructed. It was in 1892 that Hubbard suddenly gave up the soap industry and decided to become a writer. In 1899 Hubbard published the famous and widely reprinted essay, "A Message to Garcia". By 1913 an estimated 40 million copies had been published.

Construction on the Hubbard House's two-story front elevation began around 1872 at the urging of Mrs. Hubbard who felt the family had outgrown the small cottage that occupied the site from 1857 until 1872. Despite her desires and Silas Hubbard's prominent position as the only doctor in Hudson, the family had little money with which to pursue the addition to their home. Hubbard was known not to push his clients for payment. In response, Elbert and his mother pored over Silas' records searching for any one they thought might be able to make payment through labor or construction materials. Elbert, already a considerable salesman by 1872, then rode about McLean County to obtain cash, materials and promises of labor from his father's clientele. Soon the new section of the house was completed.

== Architecture ==
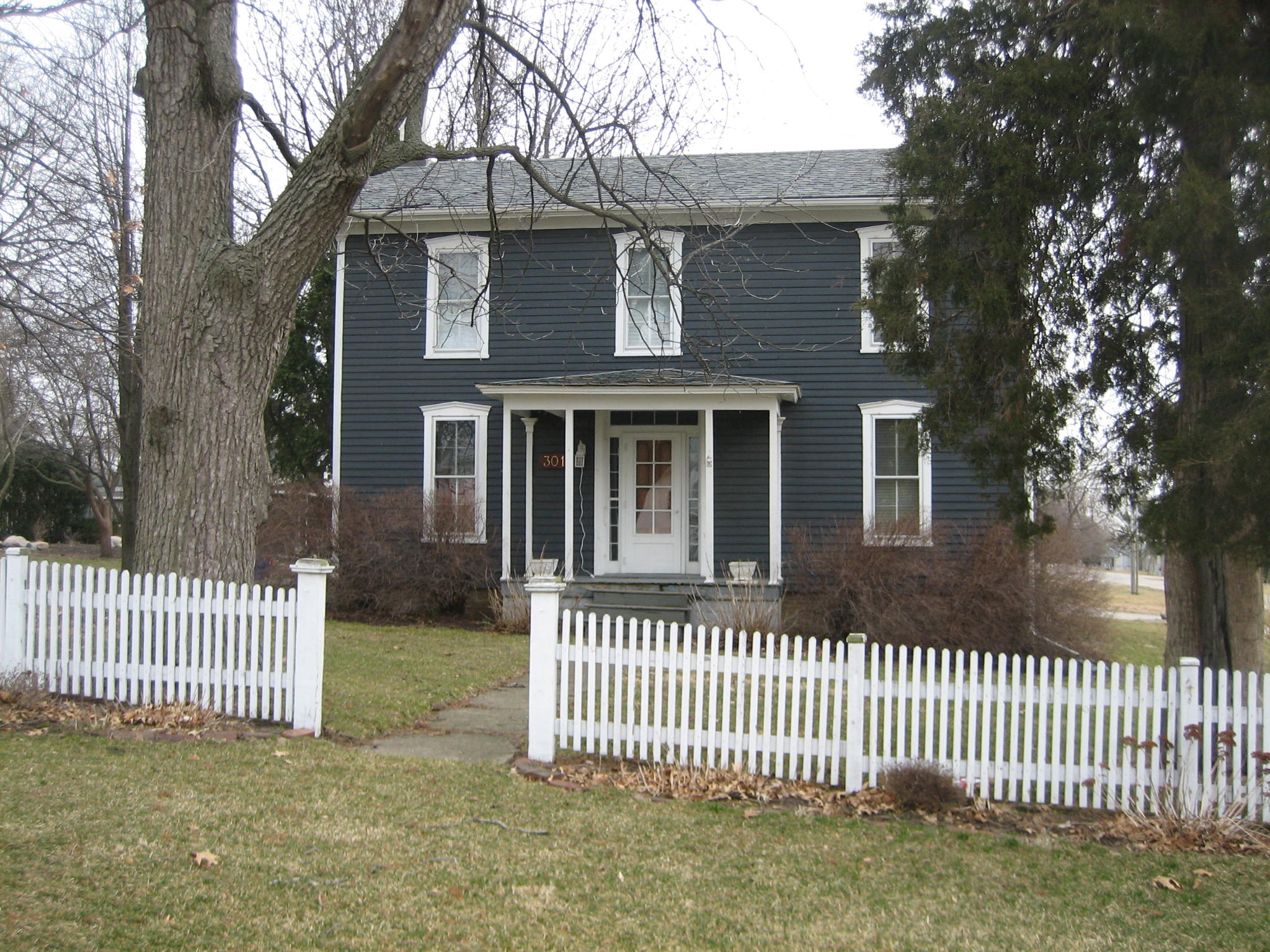
The simple I-house plan of the 1872 addition is plainly visible when the home is viewed from the front.

The current Hubbard House is mostly a typical I-house design but the two-story front (west) section of the house was not constructed until 1872. Until that time the Hubbard family was confined to the smaller, one-story portion of the house. Quarters were cramped during this time. The two-story portion of the house features windows on both sides of the front door and three windows on the second-floor, representing the typical I-house design. Sometime after both sections were completed a bay window was added in the angle between the wings. Elbert's room was in the attic, a room which still existed when the building was nominated to the U.S. National Register of Historic Places.

As the original house became crowded, Mrs. Hubbard concocted her own plans and layout for an additional section to be added to the house. Her plan, according to the writings of her daughter Mary, was for a two-story addition at the front elevation of the building, much as the building appears today. She envisioned a central front hall with a stairway flanked by walnut balustrades and an open parlor with folding doors opening into the living room. Mrs. Hubbard's vision for the second floor included two new children's bedrooms and a spare bedroom.

In 2008, the original portion of the house was remodeled. This portion of the structure had severe termite damage and the remodeling included reframing all walls, raising the roof, and replacing modern windows with double-hung, 4 over 4 windows that are consistent in size and style with the other windows in the home. The kitchen was also fully remodeled at this time.

== Significance ==
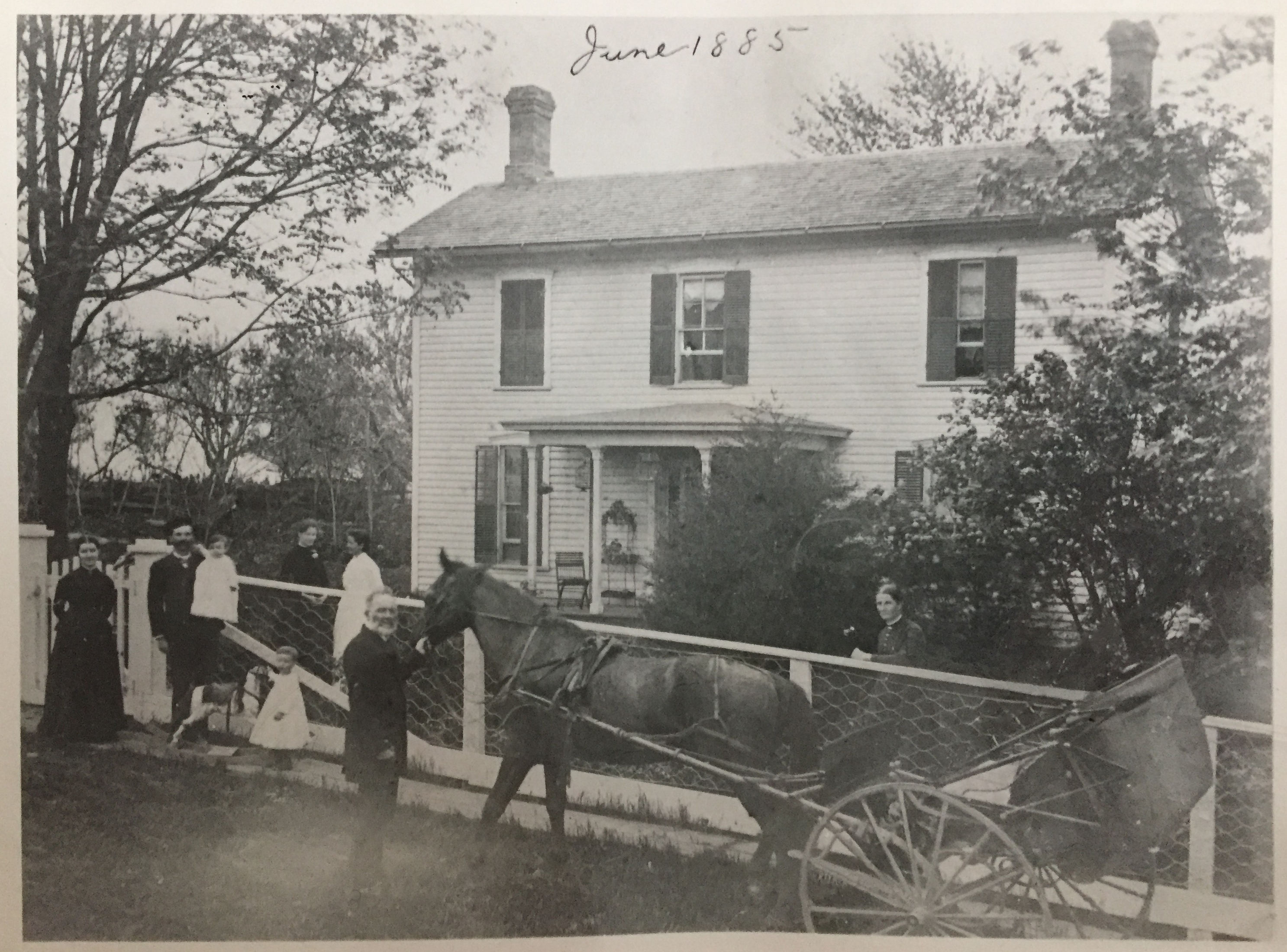
Silas Hubbard house. Birthplace of Elbert Hubbard.

The Hubbard House is significant for its association with American literature as the boyhood home of Elbert Hubbard. Hubbard became one of the most widely known personalities of his era by 1915 and was a widely read and reprinted writer and philosopher. The Hubbard House was added to the U.S. National Register of Historic Places on February 1, 1979.
