= SS Hudson =

SS Hudson is the name of the following ships:

- SS Hudson (1887), sank in Lake Superior during bad weather 16 September 1901
- SS Hudson (1921), ex-USS Powhatan (ID-3013), renamed President Filmore in 1922, scrapped in 1928

== See also ==
- Hudson (disambiguation)
