= Hudson, Illinois =

- Village
- Location in McLean County, Illinois
- Coordinates: 40°36′20″N 88°59′20″W
- Country: United States
- State: Illinois
- County: McLean
- Township: Hudson

Area
  - Total: 0.82 sq mi (2.12 km^{2})
  - Land: 0.82 sq mi (2.12 km^{2})
  - Water: 0 sq mi (0.00 km^{2})
- Elevation: 764 ft (233 m)

Population (2020)
  - Total: 1,753
  - Density: 2,140.2/sq mi (826.32/km^{2})
- Time zone: UTC-6 (CST)
  - Summer (DST): UTC-5 (CDT)
- ZIP code: 61748
- Area code: 309
- FIPS code: 17-36438
- GNIS ID: 2398555
- Website: my.hudsonil.org

Hudson is a village in McLean County, Illinois, United States. The population was 1,753 at the 2020 census. It is part of the Bloomington–Normal Metropolitan Statistical Area.

== History ==
=== Origin and naming ===
Hudson was laid out by Horatio Petit on August 13, 1836. It was one of eight towns founded in McLean County during the great real estate boom that swept through central Illinois between 1835 and 1837. It also shares the distinction of being one of two "colonial" settlements in the county; the other was the Rhode Island colony in the southwestern part of the county. Traditional sources say that the town was named for the town of Hudson in Columbia County, New York, which, so it was said, was the home of its early settlers. However, in her book on the Hudson Colony, Ruth Biting Hamm has pointed out that, while some settlers were from Queens County, New York, none came from near the town of Hudson. She suggests that it is more likely town was simply named for the Hudson River.

=== The Illinois Land Association ===
Hudson was created by the Illinois Land Association, who developed it as what was then called a colony. Colonial schemes such as this were popular in the 1830s. Rather than settlers migrating individually and buying land on their own, participants in a colony would band together, pool their money, and appoint a committee to select a large tract of land, which would then be divided among the participants. Such colonial developments do not imply that the group had any common social or religious agenda. Sometimes, the people involved came from a single area, but often, as was the case in Hudson, they were clusters of individuals who had no connection forming the colony: several of the founders of Hudson were from New York, but others were from Maine, Massachusetts, Pennsylvania and Illinois.

The Illinois Land Association was formed in February 1836 in Jacksonville. Each participant would contribute $235 to the common pool and would receive four kinds of property: three lots in the main part of the town; one out lot (see below); 160 acres (650,000 m^{2}) of prairie land for farming; and 20 acres (81,000 m^{2}) of timber for fences, firewood, and building material. The association also anticipated a profit from the sale of untaken land, which would be shared among the participants. An executive committee selected the land, supervised the laying out of the town, and presided over the drawing of lots to select the division of the property.

=== Original town design ===
The 1836 plan of the town of Hudson was interesting in several respects. First, most central Illinois towns of the 1830s were laid around a central public square, but Hudson had none. Second, the town of Hudson had both "in lots" - and "out lots". The "in lots" formed the core of Hudson and were standard blocks of lots like any other town. These were surrounded by a ring of "out lots", which were slightly larger, but still part of the original town plan. At Hudson the "out lots" differ in size. The tradition of in and out lots goes back for centuries in New England, where farmers were reluctant to consign their livestock to locations far removed from the town center.

These "out lots" should not be confused with the far larger tracts of farming land that were also assigned to each settler. It is unclear why this out-of-date design should have been adopted at Hudson. The original town contained 30 blocks of "in lots", each of which contained eight lots; because each participant received several lots, the houses in the older part of town even today are often much more widely spaced than in other towns founded at the same date. Broadway was designed as the main street of Hudson, and because of this was 120 feet (37 m) wide, while other streets were only 80 feet (24 m) wide. Eventually the "in lots" and the "out lots" came to be used in much the same way, as residential building sites.

=== Development ===
Immediately after its founding Hudson fell on hard times. In 1837 the land market turned sour, settlement slowed, and Illinois sank into a deep depression. The organizers of the colony found that they were unable to purchase the intended 20 acres (81,000 m^{2}) of timber for each settler; earlier settlers had already purchased most of the available woodland. A few families received up to 20 acres (81,000 m^{2}), but most were only given only 2.5 acres (10,000 m^{2}); too little to supply their needs. Disputes arose concerning the division of profits from land sales. The number of settlers was fewer than expected. Only about twenty families moved onto the colony's land.

They did manage to build a number of substantial frame houses. There was a nearby school and two churches, but the townsfolk had little business. All of this changed in 1854 when the Illinois Central Railroad passed just west of Hudson. Business increased, many unoccupied lots were taken up, and a new commercial district developed along what had been "out-lots" along the west side of the town facing the railroad. Some old traditions continued. Early in its history, Hudson, following an ancient New England custom, had created the office of village herdsman. It was his job, at 6:00 in the morning, to walk the town streets, gather cattle from Hudson, and drive them out to pasture beyond the town limits; remarkably this job continued until 1913.

=== Growth continues ===
With the arrival of the railroad, the success of the town of Hudson was assured. The surrounding tallgrass prairie proved to be some of the most fertile agricultural land in the world. Initially the crops were corn and oats, produced together with a great deal of livestock. In the 1850s and 1860s settlers came in great numbers. By the mid-twentieth century livestock production had slowly begun to decline and soybeans had replaced oats as a second crop, but the great fertility of the soil remained. Hudson's growth was slow but steady. In 1873 the town was incorporated. By 1883 telephone service had come to the town, and in 1912 the first electric lights were installed. In 1916 a new town hall was built. In the late twentieth century, because of its proximity to Bloomington and Normal, Hudson was becoming increasingly popular as a residential community. In 1992 Interstate 39 was completed, connecting Hudson with El Paso and Normal.

== Geography ==
Hudson is located in northwestern McLean County. Interstate 39 passes along the western boundary of the village, with access from Exit 5. I-39 leads south 5 miles (8 km) to Normal and north 9 miles (14 km) to El Paso.

According to the U.S. Census Bureau, Hudson has a total area of 0.82 square miles (2.12 km^{2}), all land.

== Demographics ==
Historical population
Census	Pop.	Note	%±
1880	276		—
1890	273		−1.1%
1900	378		38.5%
1910	375		−0.8%
1920	309		−17.6%
1930	330		6.8%
1940	324		−1.8%
1950	330		1.9%
1960	493		49.4%
1970	802		62.7%
1980	929		15.8%
1990	1,006		8.3%
2000	1,510		50.1%
2010	1,838		21.7%
2020	1,753		−4.6%
Decennial US Census

=== 2020 census ===
As of the 2020 census, Hudson had a population of 1,753. The median age was 40.1 years. 26.9% of residents were under the age of 18 and 13.7% of residents were 65 years of age or older. For every 100 females there were 100.1 males, and for every 100 females age 18 and over there were 95.9 males age 18 and over.

0.0% of residents lived in urban areas, while 100.0% lived in rural areas.

There were 642 households in Hudson, of which 38.8% had children under the age of 18 living in them. Of all households, 70.6% were married-couple households, 10.3% were households with a male householder and no spouse or partner present, and 14.2% were households with a female householder and no spouse or partner present. About 16.8% of all households were made up of individuals and 7.9% had someone living alone who was 65 years of age or older.

There were 657 housing units, of which 2.3% were vacant. The homeowner vacancy rate was 1.3% and the rental vacancy rate was 0.0%.

Racial composition as of the 2020 census
Race	Number	Percent
White	1,648	94.0%
Black or African American	7	0.4%
American Indian and Alaska Native	1	0.1%
Asian	8	0.5%
Native Hawaiian and Other Pacific Islander	0	0.0%
Some other race	9	0.5%
Two or more races	80	4.6%
Hispanic or Latino (of any race)	38	2.2%

=== 2000 census ===
As of the census of 2000, there were 1,510 people, 507 households, and 432 families residing in the village. The population density was 2,272.1 inhabitants per square mile (877.3/km^{2}). There were 519 housing units at an average density of 780.9 per square mile (301.5/km^{2}). The racial makeup of the village was 98.48% White, 0.07% African American, 0.13% Native American, 0.46% Asian, 0.40% from other races, and 0.46% from two or more races. Hispanic or Latino of any race were 1.06% of the population.

There were 507 households, out of which 50.7% had children under the age of 18 living with them, 77.9% were married couples living together, 5.5% had a female householder with no husband present, and 14.6% were non-families. 12.4% of all households were made up of individuals, and 4.7% had someone living alone who was 65 years of age or older. The average household size was 2.98 and the average family size was 3.25.

In the village, the population was spread out, with 33.2% under the age of 18, 5.0% from 18 to 24, 37.1% from 25 to 44, 18.5% from 45 to 64, and 6.1% who were 65 years of age or older. The median age was 32 years. For every 100 females, there were 94.1 males. For every 100 females age 18 and over, there were 94.6 males.

The median income for a household in the village was $62,632, and the median income for a family was $65,703. Males had a median income of $45,385 versus $29,659 for females. The per capita income for the village was $22,141. About 1.8% of families and 1.2% of the population were below the poverty line, including 2.0% of those under age 18 and none of those age 65 or over.

== Notable people ==
- Ben Corbett (1892–1961), film actor known mainly for westerns; born in Hudson
- Elbert Hubbard (1856–1915), known for his essay "A Message of Garcia"
- Nate Lavender (Born 2000), Major League Baseball Pitcher
- Melville Elijah Stone (1848–1929), journalist, owner of the Chicago Daily News

== See also ==
- Gildersleeve House
- Hubbard House
