= Hudson (steam automobile) =

Defunct American motor vehicle manufacturer

The Hudson was an automobile built in Hudson, Michigan by the Bean-Chamberlain Manufacturing Company from 1901 to 1902. It had no relationship to the Hudson Motor Car Company of Detroit, Michigan. The Hudson was a light steamer, with a vertical two-cylinder engine, single chain drive, and tiller steering.
