= Joel H. Hubbard House =

Historic house in Illinois, United States

- U.S. National Register of Historic Places
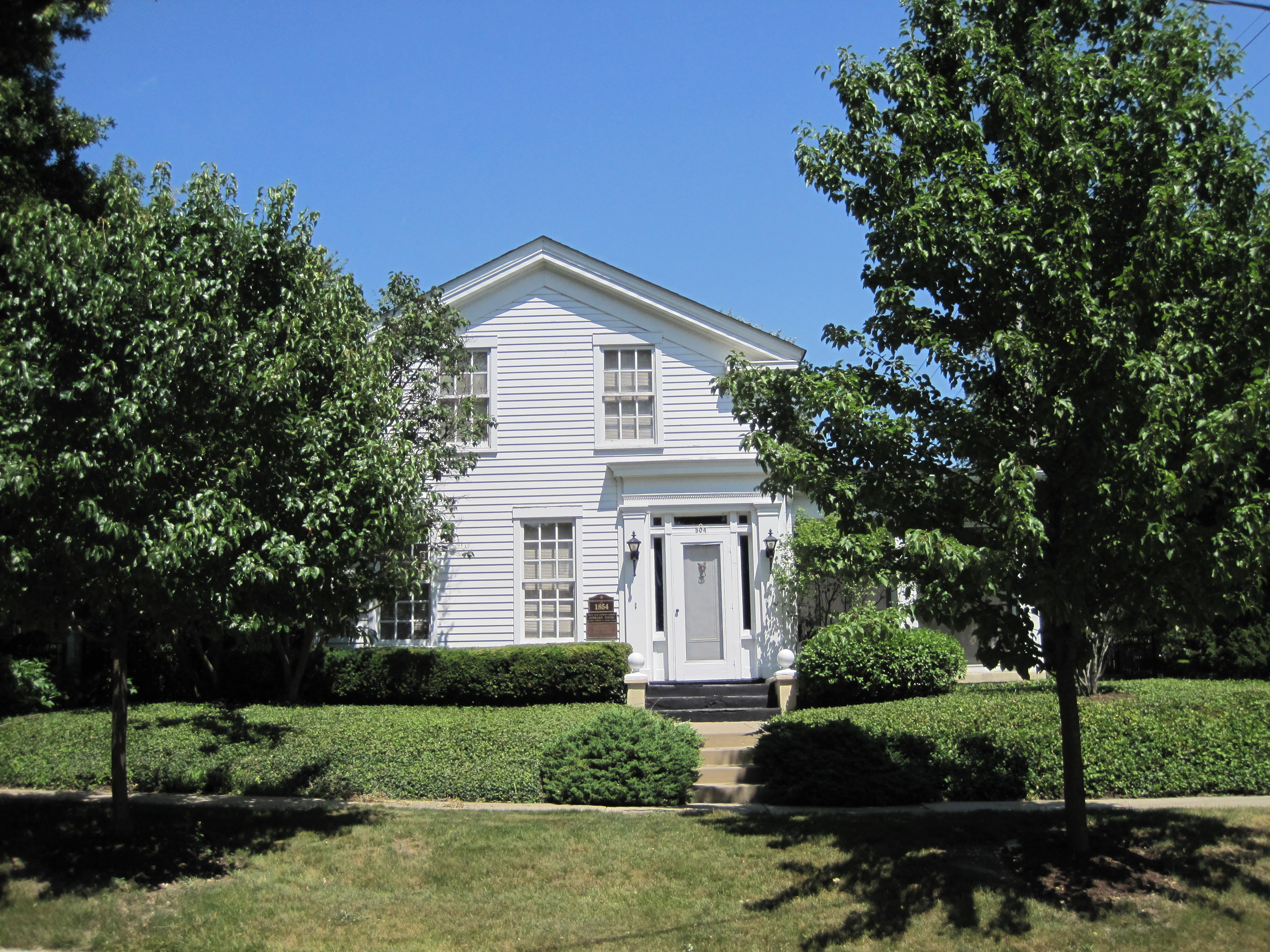
- Hubbard House in 2011

- Location within Illinois Location within the United States
- Location: 304 N. 2nd Ave., St. Charles, Illinois
- Coordinates: 41°54′59″N 88°18′43″W
- Built: 1854
- Architect: Joel H. Hubbard
- Architectural style: Greek Revival
- NRHP reference No.: 11000244
- Added to NRHP: May 4, 2011

The Joel H. Hubbard House, also known as the Ferson–Butler–Satterlee Home, is a historic residence in St. Charles, Illinois. The Greek Revival structure is constructed of wood on a stone foundation with an asphalt roof. It remains structurally similar to its original 1854 design with the exception of a sunroom addition. Joel H. Hubbard was a carpenter who originally designed this house and lived there for at least a year. The next owner was George Ferson, a member of the Kane County Board of Supervisors. It was listed on the National Register of Historic Places on May 4, 2011.
