= Terraplane =

1930s American car brand

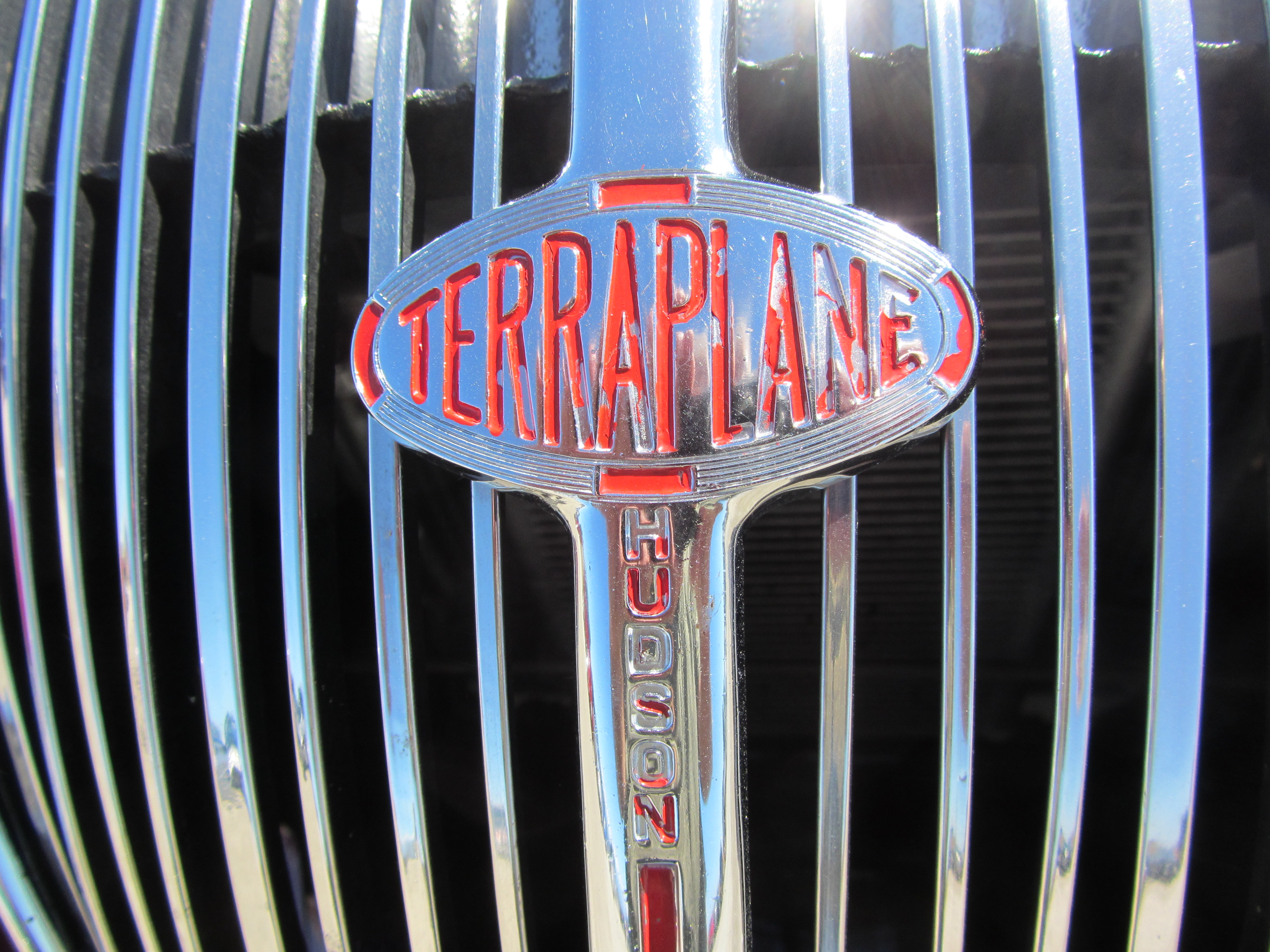

Overview
- Manufacturer: Hudson Motor Car Company
- Production: 1932–1938

Body and chassis
- Layout: FR layout

The Terraplane was a car brand and model built by the Hudson Motor Car Company of Detroit, Michigan, between 1932 and 1938. In its maiden year, the car was branded as the Essex-Terraplane; in 1934 the car became simply the Terraplane. They were inexpensive yet powerful vehicles that were used in both town and country. The Terraplane name was used for both cars and trucks.

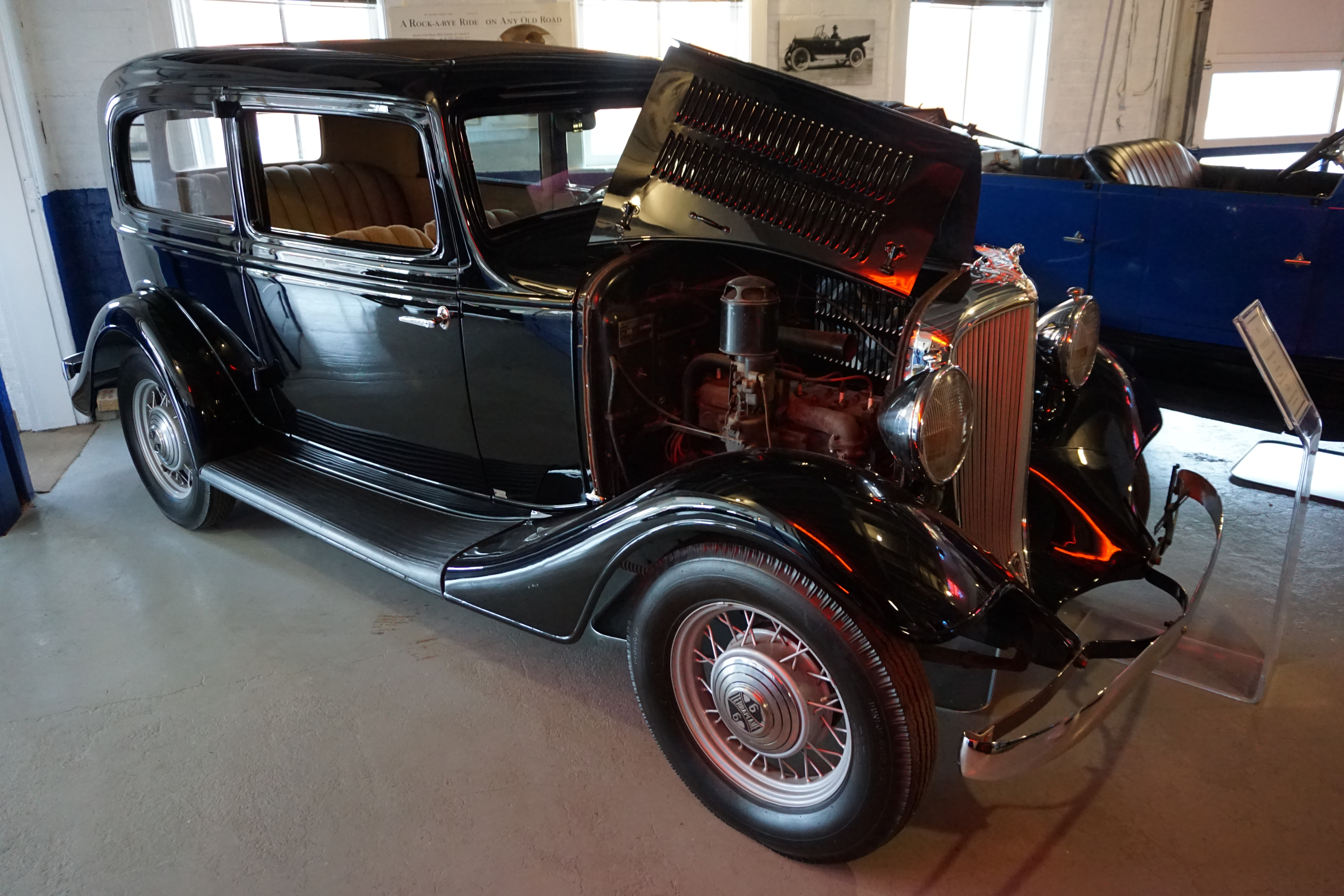
1933 Terraplane K

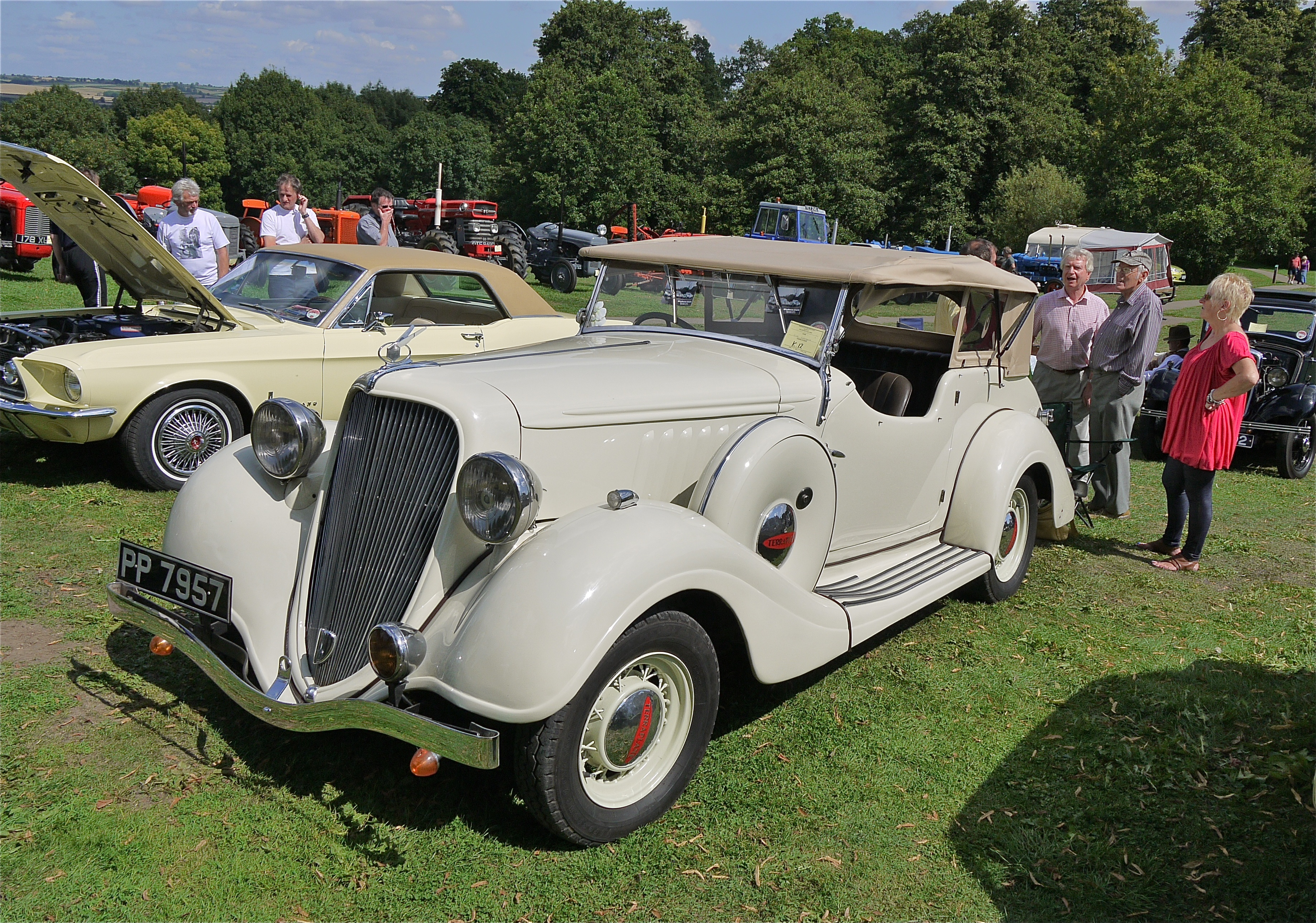
1934 Terraplane Tourer

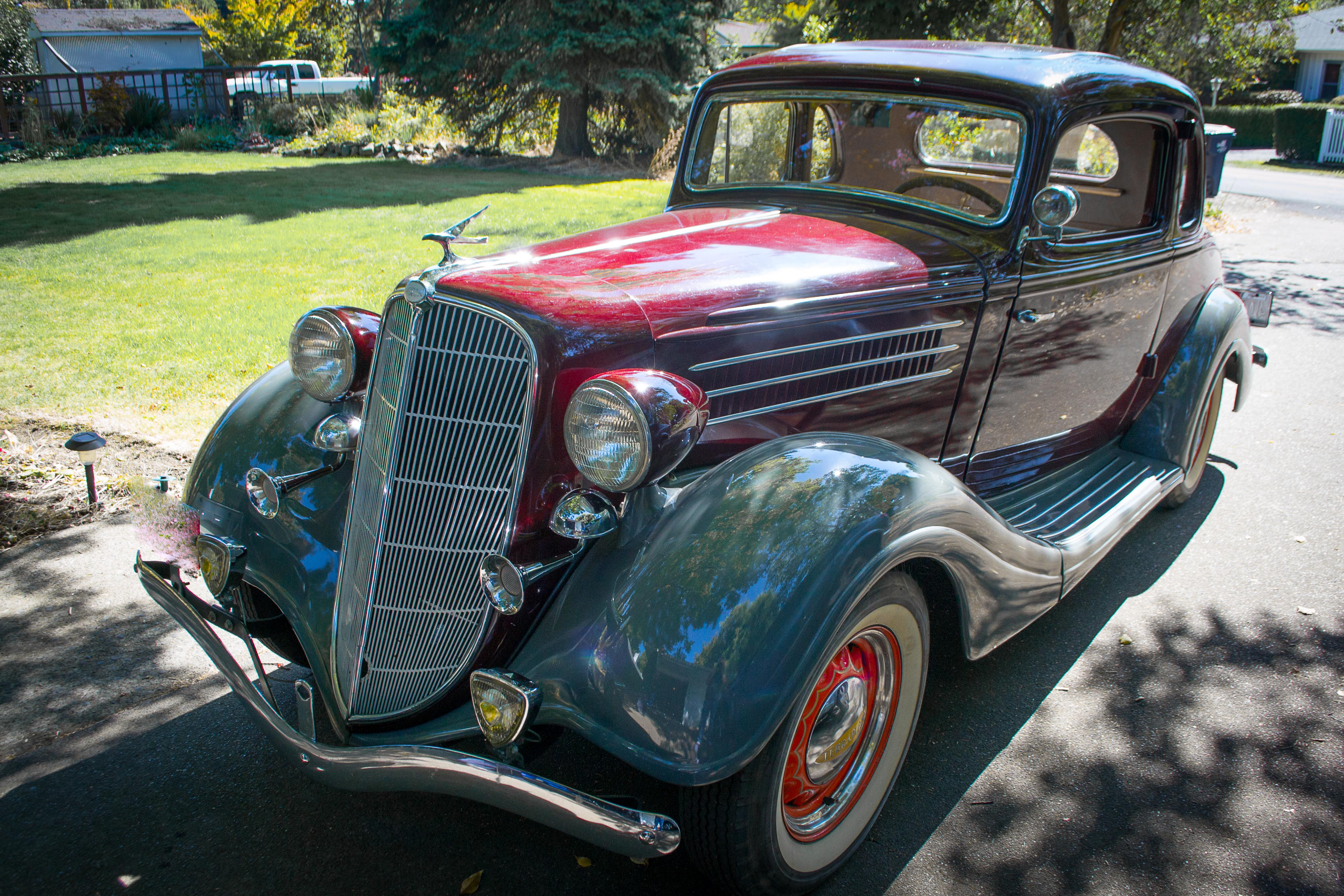
1935 Terraplane Coupe

== Changing marketplace ==
Hudson had manufactured the inexpensive Essex from 1919 as a lower-priced vehicle line; the company merged Essex into itself in 1922. The Essex is generally credited with helping to make the fully enclosed automobile an affordable model for inexpensive automobiles. The low-priced closed model Essex coach "had promoted the sensational recovery of Hudson" as an automaker in 1922.

Declining sales of the Essex, combined with the growing economic pressure and suffering from the effects of the Great Depression forced Hudson to replace the Essex with a re-designed automobile with a lower manufacturing cost and selling price. Roy D. Chapin decided to repeat the successful strategy in 1932 by producing "a very light car in the bottom price class, a vehicle which would combine style, comfort, and reliability". Although it was daring to launch a car during the Great Depression, Chapin was convinced that the Terraplane name would have "great public appeal" as it also linked with the public interest in aviation that was so prevalent at that time.

The Terraplane contributed greatly to Hudson Motor's sales during the Depression in the 1930s. Sales of the Terraplane outpaced Hudson vehicles in the late mid-1930s and it is said that Hudson management was not fond of that fact and that was partly why they chose to eliminate the car as a make. One unique feature was "Duo-Automatic" brakes. Terraplanes had two brake systems—hydraulic and mechanical. Should the hydraulic brakes fail (i.e. the brake line had a leak in it), the mechanical brakes would be used to stop the car.

The most memorable sales slogan of the Terraplane years came from 1933: "On the sea that's aquaplaning, in the air that's aeroplaning, but on the land, in the traffic, on the hills, hot diggity dog, THAT'S TERRAPLANING".

=== 1932 ===
The new Essex-Terraplane was launched on July 21, 1932, "with [such] sensational vigor" that "accounts of the affair appeared in newspapers throughout the United States." The special event included over 2,000 dealers who came from 40 states to Detroit. Hudson also had famous aviator Amelia Earhart helping to introduce the first Essex-Terraplane. It was a small, but powerful, car with a steel frame, built to exacting standards, which is possibly why Orville Wright purchased one of the first Essex-Terraplanes for himself. The 1932 model bore a slight resemblance to its Essex predecessors. The 1932 model had just the name "Essex" on the radiator ornament, but the 1933 models had the name "Essex-Terraplane" on the radiator ornament.

In 1932, only the Model K on the 106-inch (2,692 mm) wheelbase with a 193 cu in (3.2 L) 6-cylinder engine was available.

=== 1933 ===
The Essex-Terraplanes were available in all the common U.S. automobile body styles. For 1933 offerings were expanded. The Model K was retained. A Model KU 6-cylinder on 113 in (2,870 mm) wheelbase was added. Also a Model KT with a 244 cu in (4.0 L) straight-8-cylinder was offered on the 113-inch wheelbase. There were "Standard" and "Deluxe" trim levels for the KU and KT. A limited selection of light commercial vehicles was offered starting in 1933.

Only the 1933 Essex-Terraplanes were made with an optional eight-cylinder engine. The Hudson had the identical basic engine, but with earlier style updraft carburetor carried over, and a displacement of 254 cu in (4.2 L) due to a larger cylinder bore than the Essex-Terraplane Eight. The Terraplane Eight engines featured more efficient downdraft carburetion. Both engines had the same crankshaft and stroke.

The 1933 Essex-Terraplane 8-cylinder cars were believed to have the highest horsepower-to-weight ratio of any production automobiles in the world, and were favored by several gangsters of the day, particularly John Dillinger, Baby Face Nelson, and John Paul Chase, for their lightness, acceleration, handling, and discreet appearance.

The Essex-Terraplane Eight was distinguished by having vent doors on the hood as opposed to all six-cylinder versions that had stamped hood louvers. A 1933 Terraplane 8 convertible coupe set a record for the race to the summit of Mount Washington that remained unbroken for over twenty years. Essex-Terraplanes participated in innumerable record events around the United States, and some others around the world setting dozens of records at many venues. Their particular strength was in hillclimbs. Period road tests showed 0-60 mph in 14.4 seconds, and 10-60 mph in top gear in 18 seconds.

=== 1934 ===
For 1934, the word "Essex" was dropped and the car became the Terraplane. The cars were slightly heavier and rarely joined competitive events, particularly as they now lacked the eight-cylinder powerplant. The name Terraplane remained constant through the 1937 model year. By 1936, Terraplane commercial cars were produced in larger numbers.

=== 1938 ===
In 1938, knowing they were going to drop the Terraplane, Hudson management chose to phase out the Terraplane name similarly to how it had been introduced, and the 1938 cars were named Hudson-Terraplanes. Concurrently for the 1938 model year, Hudson offered a Model 112 which was virtually indistinguishable in equipment from the Hudson Terraplane, but on a shorter 112 in (2,845 mm) wheelbase and with a smaller engine. The Terraplane did not have an ammeter or an oil pressure gauge. Price for a Terraplane in 1938 was about US$900 ($20,585 in 2025 dollars).

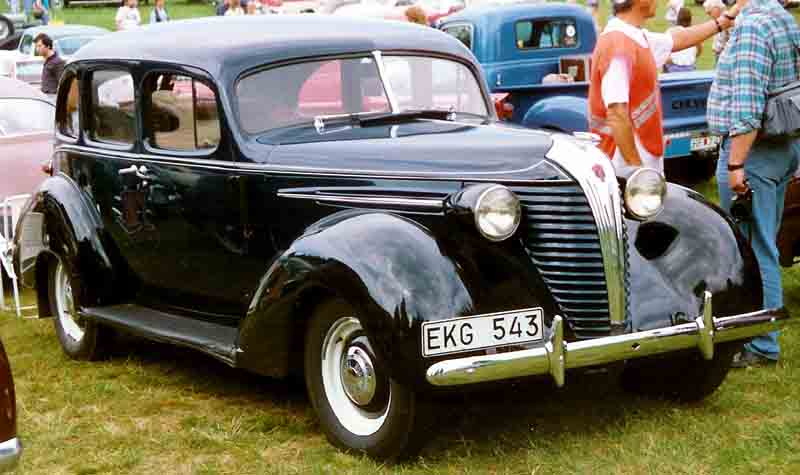
1938 Terraplane 4-Door Sedan

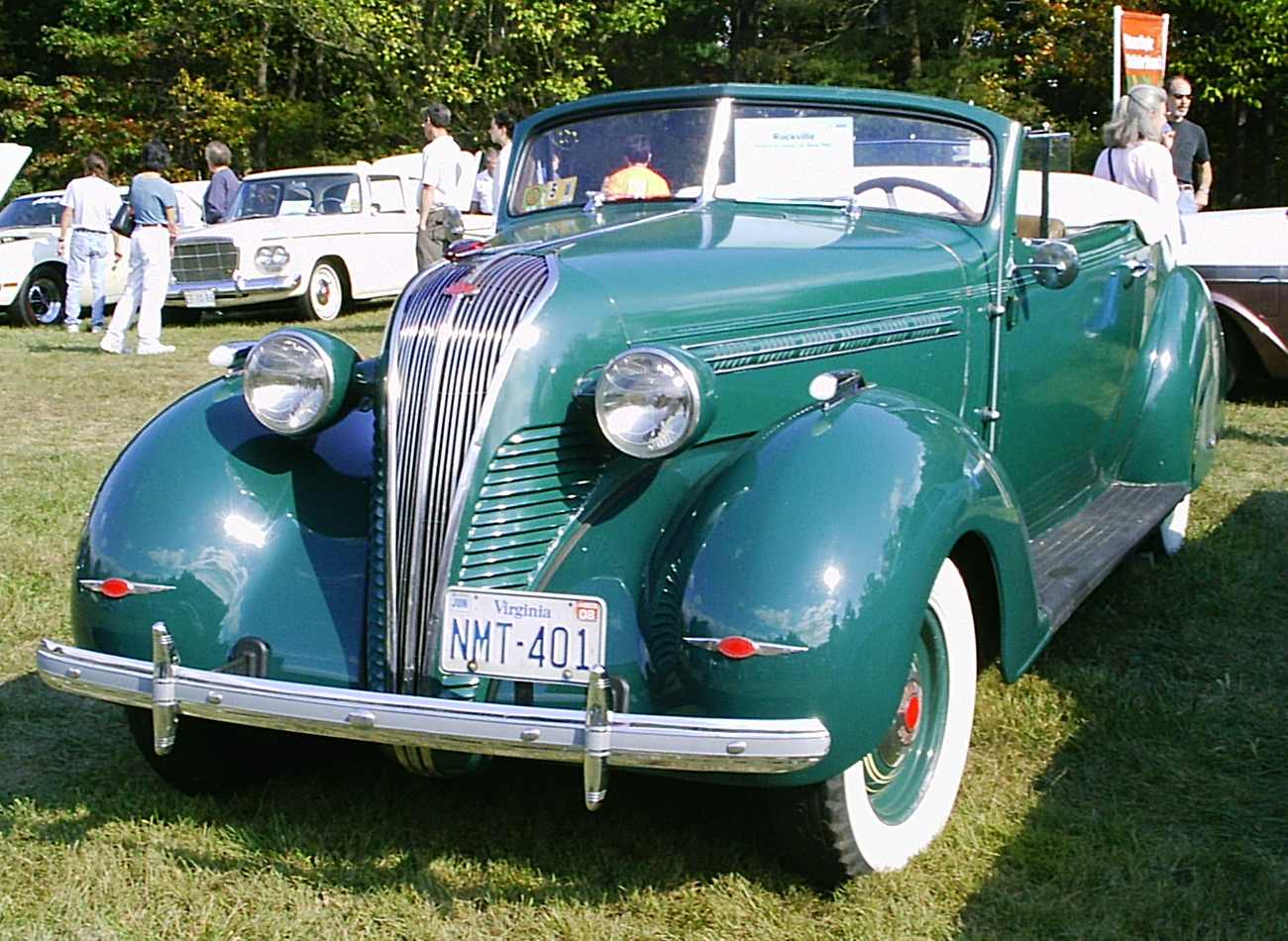
Terraplane Convertible

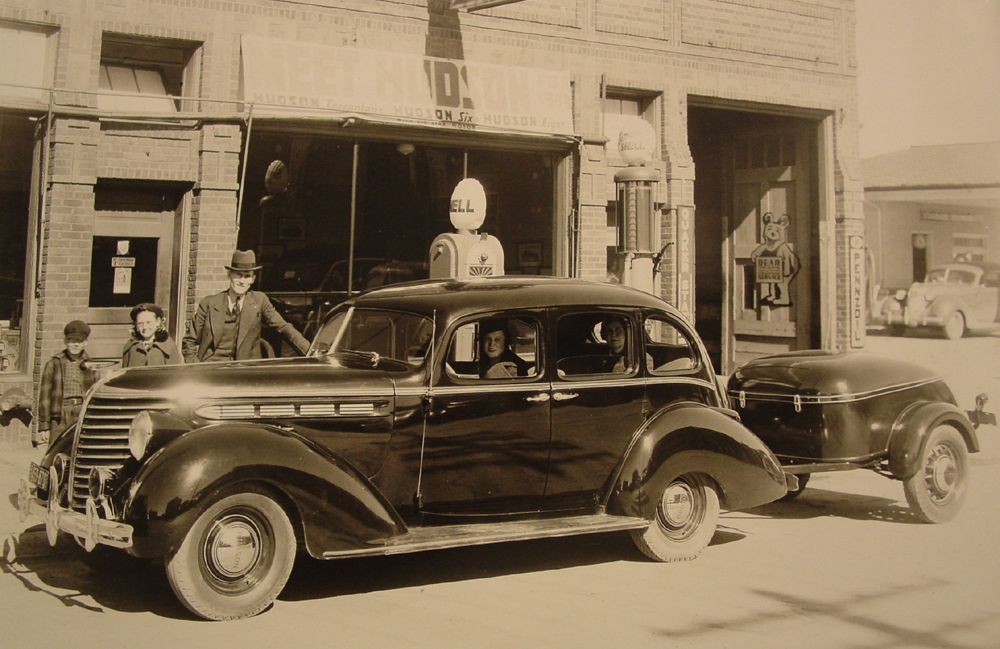
New 1938 Terraplane with Mullins Red Cap Trailer

== International markets ==
Hudson vehicles were assembled in other countries under license. The British sounding names of "Hudson" and "Essex" had made them popular in countries of the Commonwealth, and thus Terraplanes also were built outside the U.S. in Canada, England, Australia, New Zealand, and South Africa in low volume.

=== Australia ===
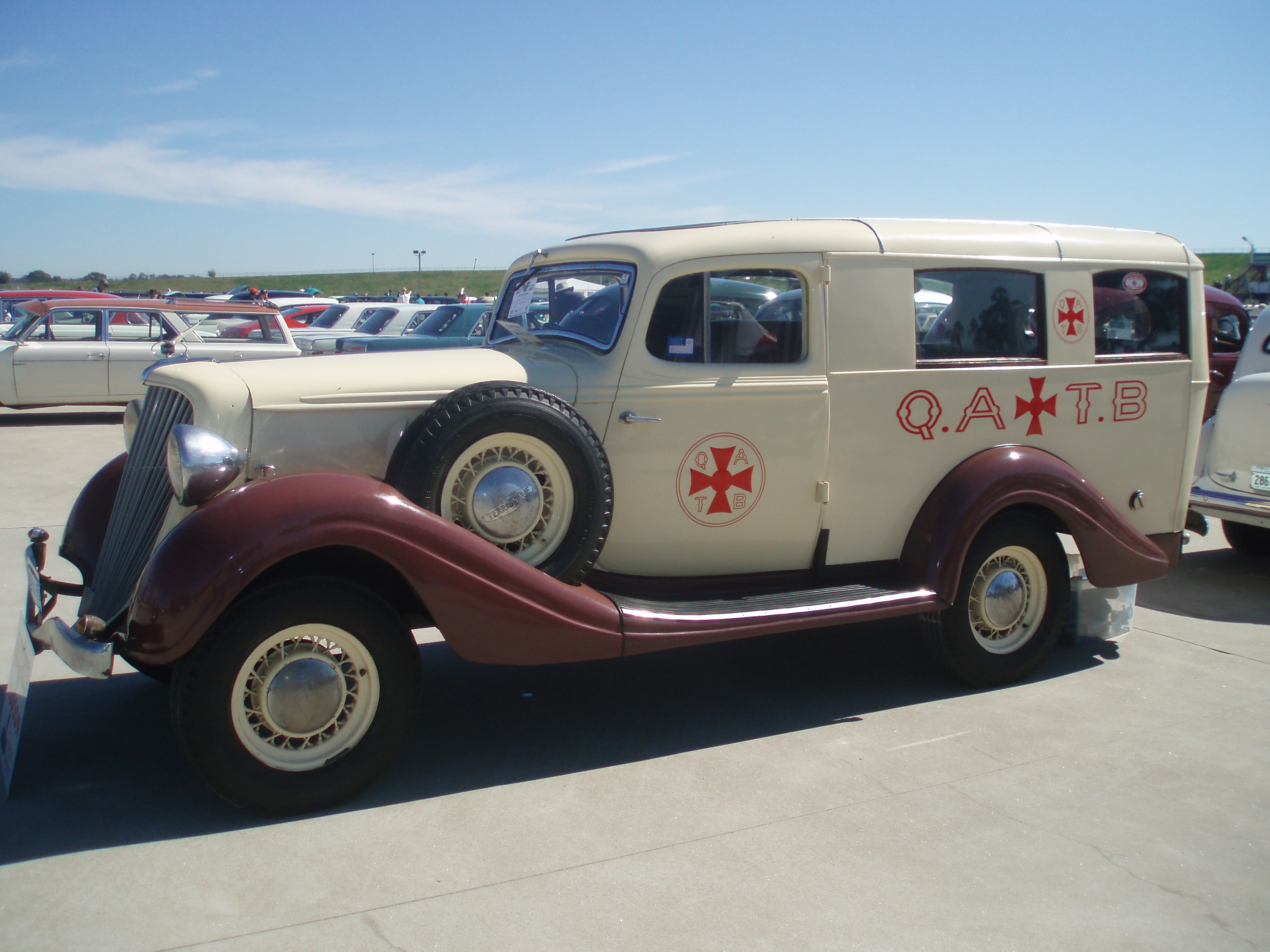
1934 Terraplane (Queensland Ambulance Transport Brigade)

Australian law in the early 20th Century made it impractical to import a fully assembled car and thus main bodies were built by local vehicle body builders over an imported chassis. In a few cases these bodies included styles not available in the U.S. market such as tourers (U.S. equivalent phaeton) and coupe utilities (the Australian car-based pickup truck).

In 1915, the Sydney branch of Dalgety & Co. Ltd became the distributor of Hudson and Essex vehicles as well as other marques for New South Wales. From 1922, Sydney company Smith & Waddington built vehicle bodies for Dalgety and other companies. Smith & Waddington built the majority of the early Terraplane bodies with some also built by Sydney coach builder G.H Olding & Sons. In February 1934, Ruskins Body Works of West Melbourne secured the contract to build Hudson and Terraplane bodies for the whole of Australia. In June 1937, Neal's Motors celebrated assembling its 30,000th automobile: a 1937 Hudson Terraplane.

=== New Zealand ===
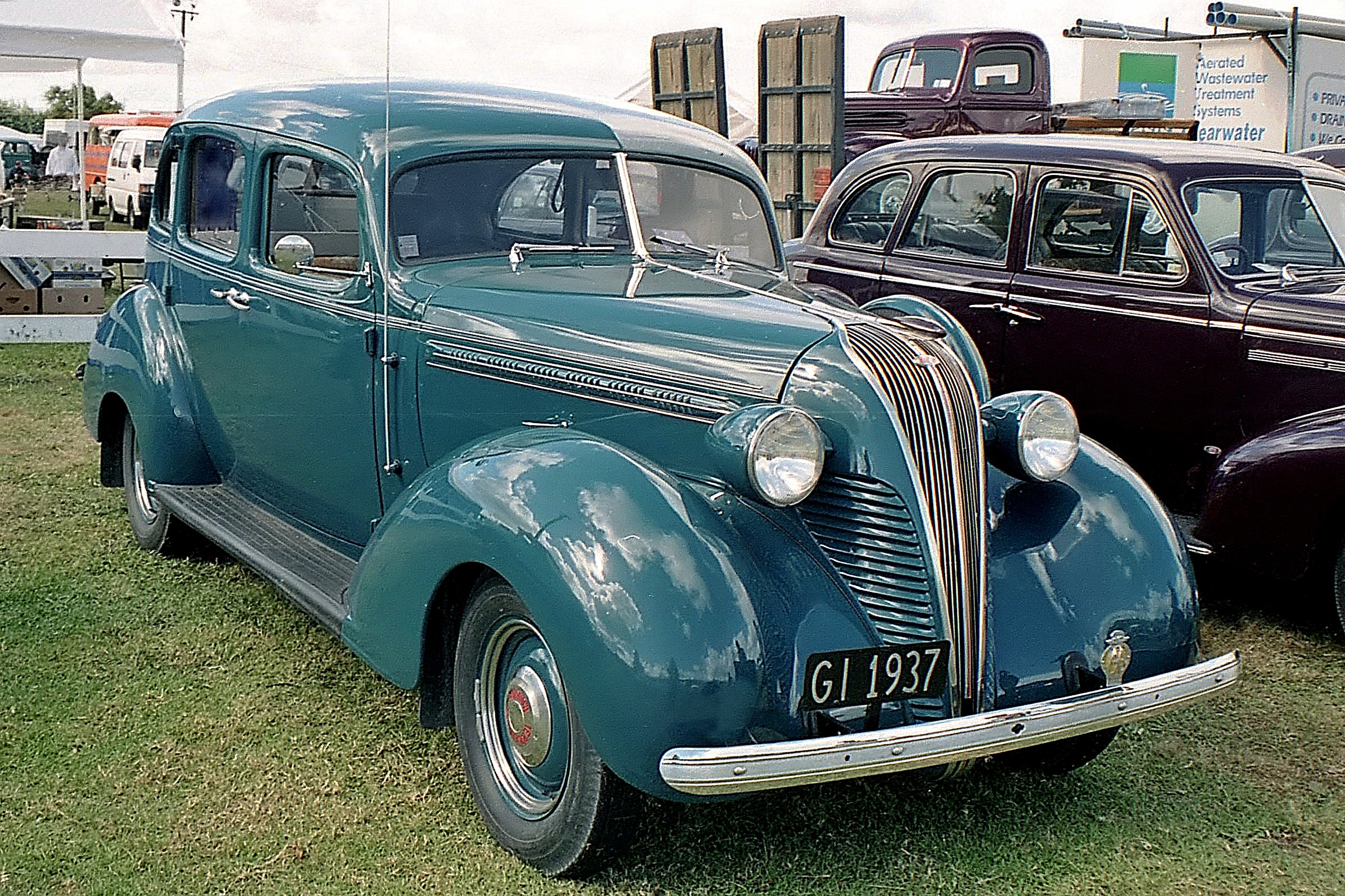
1937 Hudson Terraplane coupe (New Zealand)

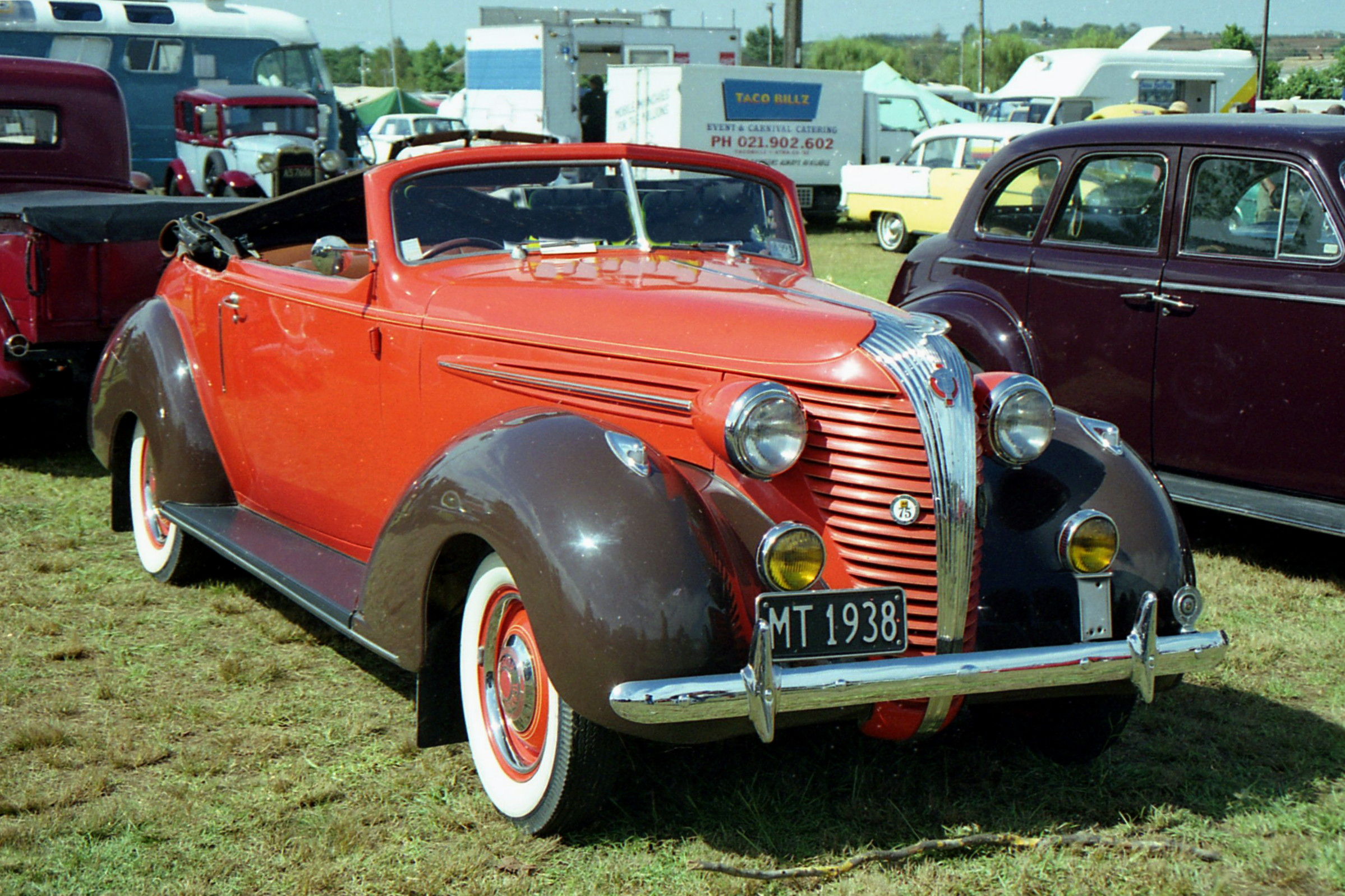
1938 Hudson Terraplane convertible (New Zealand)

Hudson and Essex vehicles were imported into New Zealand by Dominion Motors of Wellington which began operations in 1912. After Dominion Motors amalgamated with Universal Motor Company of Christchurch in 1919 the company added other marques from the United States and Britain. Vehicles, including Terraplanes, were assembled in-house from knock-down kits.

For South Island, Hudson and Essex vehicles were imported by W.G. Vining Limited of Nelson, beginning in 1912. Other U.S. and European brands were added and after the business was sold on 30 September 1927 Vining's son formed a new business, P. Vining & Scott, and continued the Hudson and Essex franchise.

From 1935, Hudson and Terraplane vehicles (along with Nash, Studebaker, and Standard) were assembled by Christchurch company Motor Assemblies Limited. Production of all other marques ended when the company was acquired by Standard-Triumph International in 1954.

=== United Kingdom ===
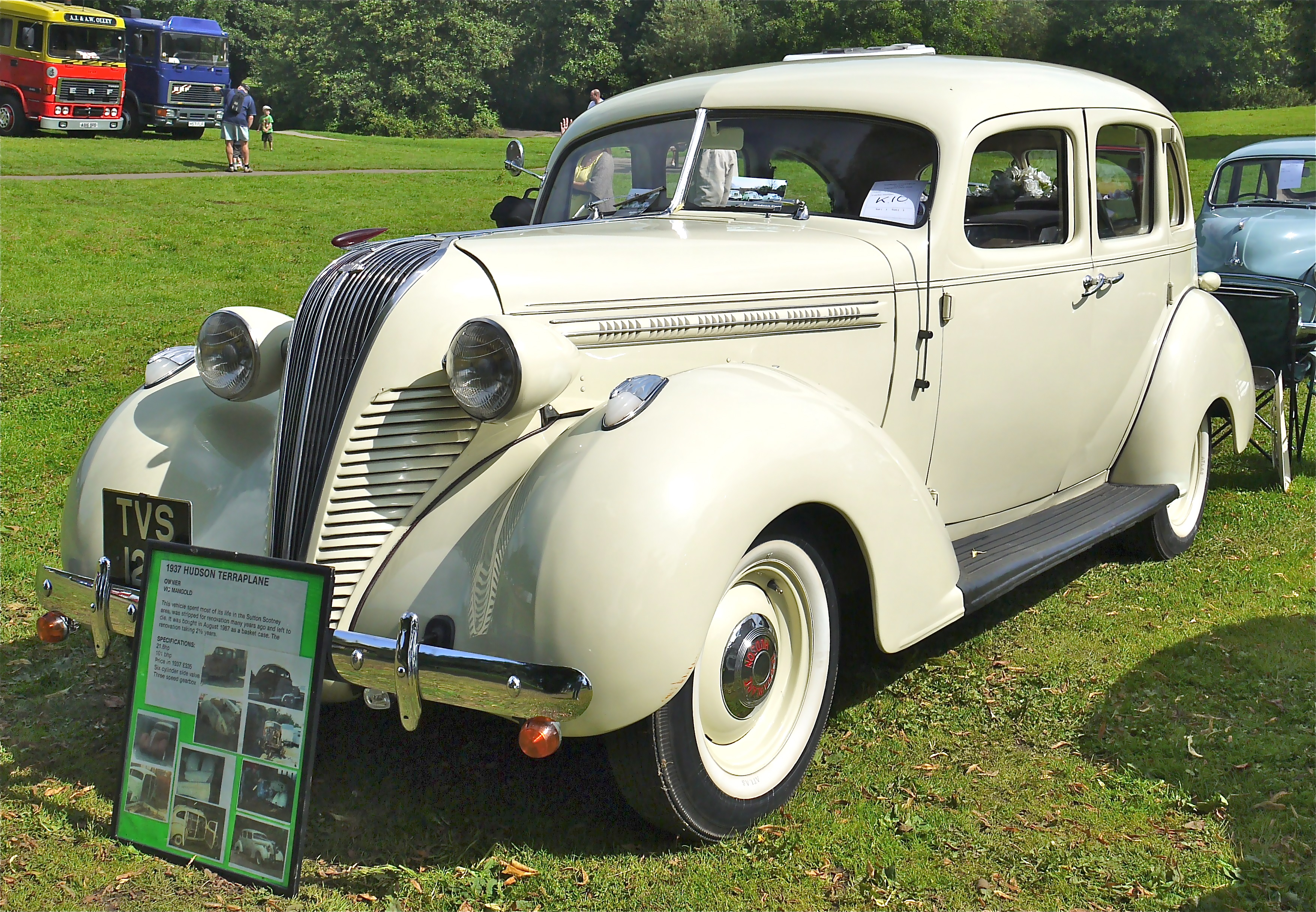
1937 Terraplane sedan

Following the First World War, Hudsons and Essex vehicles were sold through ten concessionaires. In 1922, Hudson-Essex Motors of Great Britain Limited was formed, with new premises on Dordrecht Road, in Acton Vale. In 1926, a factory was built on 4½ acres of ground on the recently opened Great West Road in Brentford. The plant opened in 1927 and a year later a three-story building was built as a service department for Hudson and Essex vehicles. The factory assembled the vehicle chassis locally but the bodies were imported as complete units from Detroit.

From 1932, the bodies came over from the United States in sections to be assembled at the Great West Road factory. After the Essex marque was retired in 1932 the British company was renamed Hudson Motors Ltd.

Hudson's new Terraplane model was equally as popular in the U.K as it was in the United States. English-designed and built bodies were built on the Terraplane frames and the cars were even entered in a number of races including the Monte Carlo Rally. Some of the cars entered were driven by personnel from the Great West Road factory. The Team Award was won by two Terraplane tourers and a Terraplane saloon in the 1933 Scottish Rally.

=== British Railton cars ===
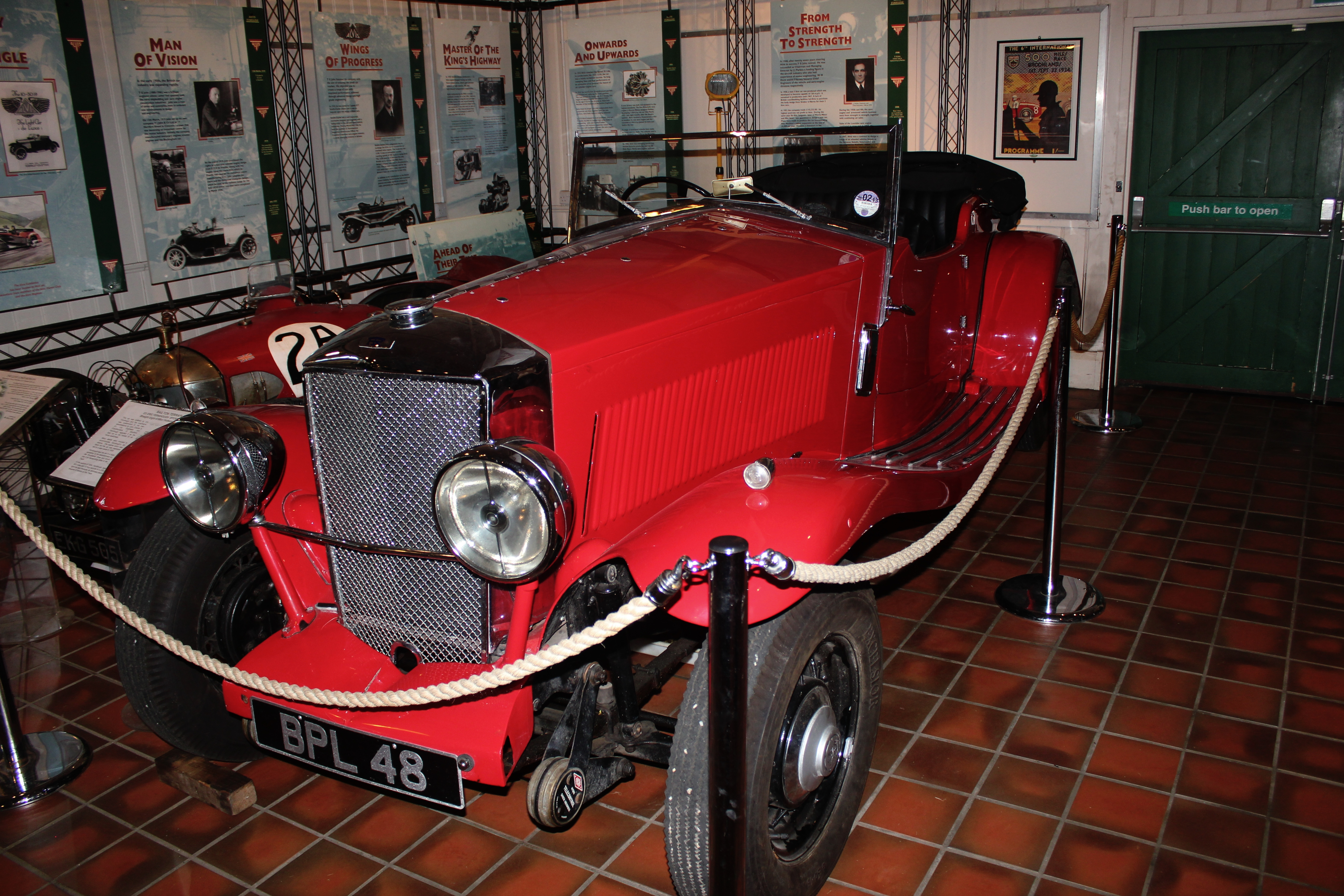
1934 Railton Terraplane at Brooklands Museum.

The Terraplane 8-cylinder chassis and engine was also used in the British Railton automobiles for their initial production year 1933.

The 1934 Light Sports Tourer used a lightweight open four-seater body and mildly modified engine. It achieved 0-60 mph in 8.8 seconds, a sensational time pre-war, and a top speed of 107 mph on the 3.3:1 rear axle. The engine was so flexible that it could be driven in circles on full lock in top gear without snatching.

Numerous coach builders constructed Railton bodies for the Terraplane and later Hudson chassis. Railton cars continued to be built on 1934 Hudson 8, and later Hudson 6- and 8-cylinder chassis through 1939. The company was bought by Hudson in 1939.

== See also ==
- Hudson Utility Coupe
- Terraplane Blues, a 1936 blues song recorded by Robert Johnson
