= Hubbard-Dawson House =

Historic house in Massachusetts, United States

- U.S. National Register of Historic Places
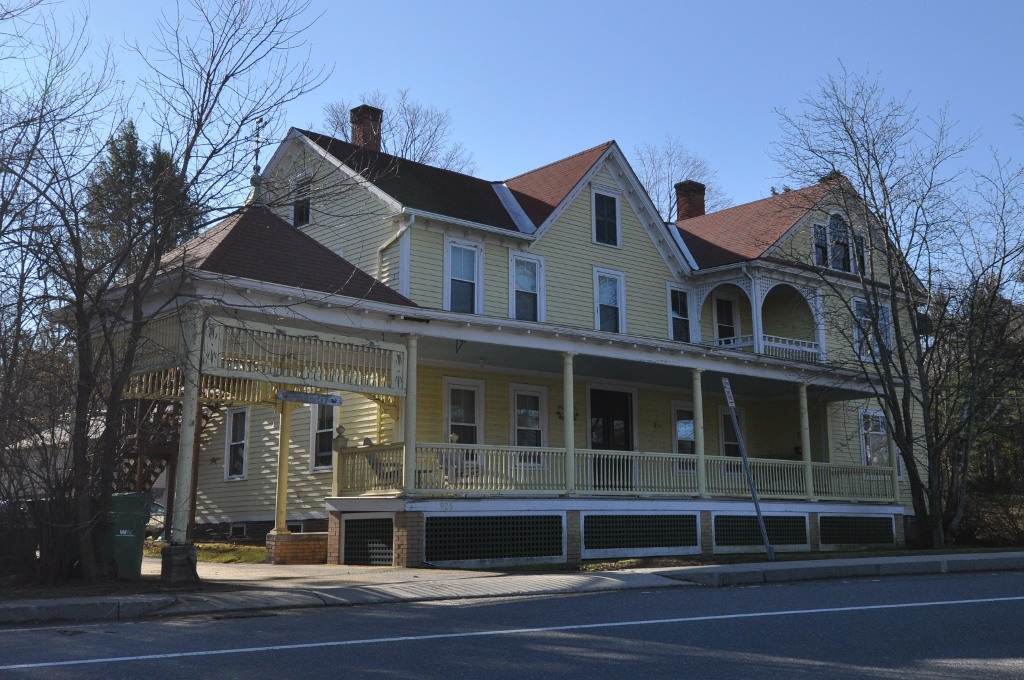

- Location within Massachusetts Location within the United States
- Location: 925 Main Street, Holden, Massachusetts
- Coordinates: 42°20′37″N 71°51′8″W
- Built: 1847
- Architectural style: Italianate, Queen Anne, Colonial Revival
- NRHP reference No.: 95001443
- Added to NRHP: December 13, 1995

The Hubbard-Dawson House is a historic house in Holden, Massachusetts. This rambling 2 1/2-story wood-frame house is the only surviving instance of Colonial Revival and Queen Anne styling in Holden. The central portion of the house is fairly old, and may date to 1832, when a house was known to be standing on the property. The house at one time had Italianate styling, as evidenced by pre-1890s photographs, which suggest construction from the 1850s, but these decorations appear to have been added onto an architecturally older building. The house is also important for its ownership by Charles Dawson, owner of the Dawson Manufacturing Company, a major local employer between 1872 and 1910.

The house was listed on the National Register of Historic Places in 1995.

== See also ==
- National Register of Historic Places listings in Worcester County, Massachusetts
