= Hudson Taylor (disambiguation) =

Hudson Taylor (1832–1905) was a British Protestant missionary

Hudson Taylor may also refer to:

- Hudson Taylor (group), Irish folk duo
- Hudson Taylor (wrestler) (born 1987), American wrestler and LGBT activist
