= Gildersleeve House =

Historic house in Illinois, United States

- Formerly listed on the U.S. National Register of Historic Places
- Location within Illinois Location within the United States
- Location: 108 Broadway, Hudson, Illinois
- Coordinates: 40°36′21″N 88°59′14″W
- Area: less than one acre
- Built: 1836
- Architectural style: Greek Revival
- NRHP reference No.: 77001517

Significant dates
- Added to NRHP: July 28, 1977
- Removed from NRHP: January 6, 2020

The Gildersleeve House was a house located at 108 Broadway in Hudson, Illinois. Settler James T. Gildersleeve built the Greek Revival house for his family in 1836. Gildersleeve founded the village of Hudson and named it after the area of New York where he formerly lived. The house was the village's first frame house and was its finest home in its early years; as a result, it hosted local events and was the village's first post office. Gildersleeve planted five oak trees outside the house; the trees grew together at their base, giving the house the name "Five Oaks". The house was demolished in 2000.

The house was added to the National Register of Historic Places on July 28, 1977, and was delisted in 2020.
