= Hill Cemetery and Parson Hubbard House Historic District =

Historic district in Massachusetts, United States

- U.S. National Register of Historic Places
- U.S. Historic district
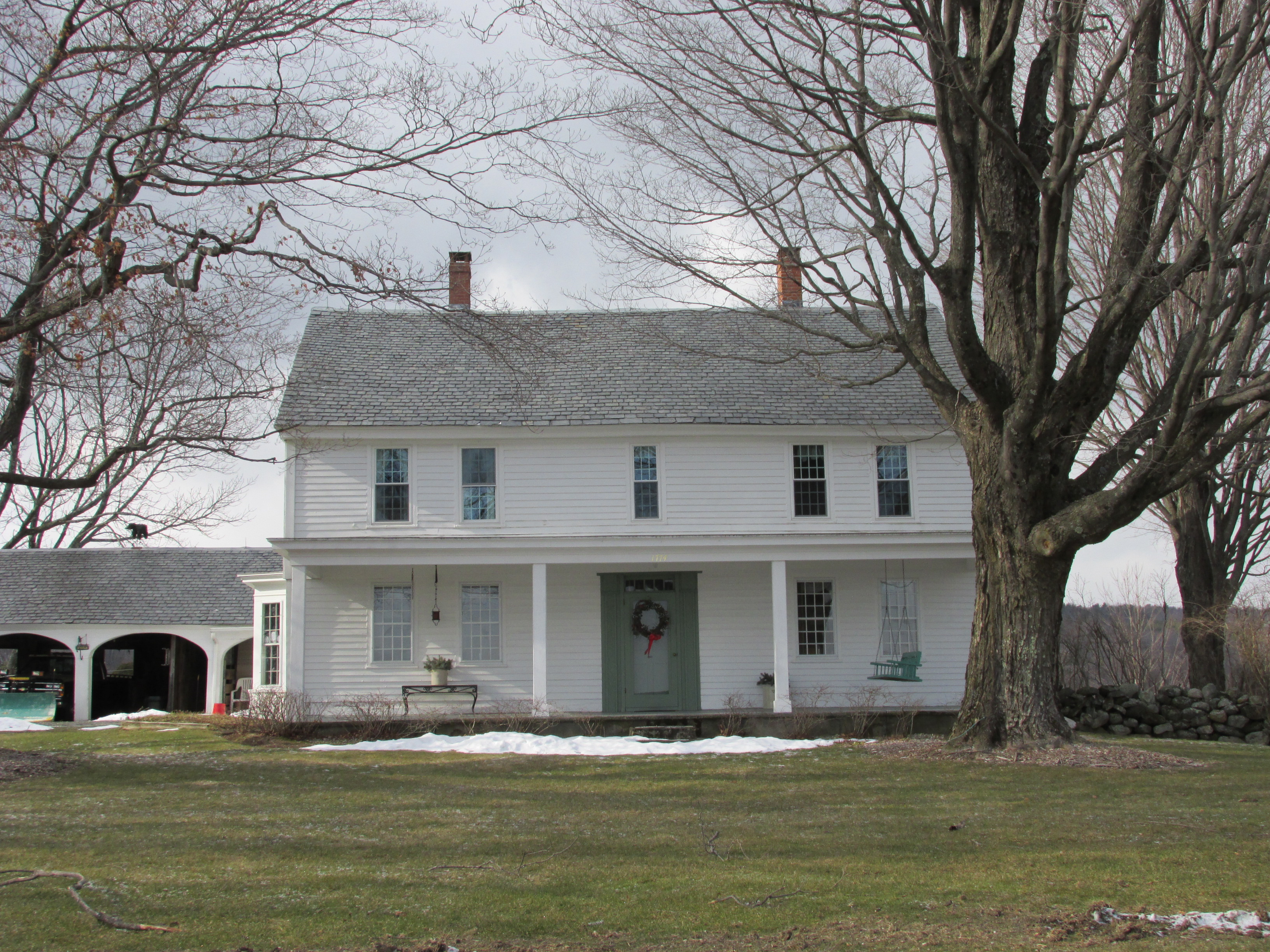
- Parson Hubbard House

- Location within Massachusetts Location within the United States
- Location: Old Village Rd., 72 Old Village Rd., Shelburne, Massachusetts
- Coordinates: 42°35′54″N 72°41′16″W
- Area: 4.7 acres (1.9 ha)
- Architectural style: Federal
- NRHP reference No.: 06000716
- Added to NRHP: August 23, 2006

The Hill Cemetery and Parson Hubbard House Historic District encompasses a historic cemetery and parsonage in Shelburne, Massachusetts. The two properties are located on Old Village Road, on a hill above the Deerfield River known as Old Village Hill, and are the oldest surviving elements of the town's early colonial settlement. The district was listed on the National Register of Historic Places in 2006.

== Description and history ==
Shelburne's Old Village Hill is located in a rural setting north of Massachusetts Route 2, at the top of a hill east of Dragon Brook traversed by Old Village Road. The cemetery occupies about 2 acres (0.81 ha) on the west side of the road, with the Hubbard House on an adjacent parcel to its north. The cemetery has about 250 grave markers, the majority of which are slate. Markers placed before the 20th century are for the most part oriented to face west, toward the setting sun, a typical practice of the period. Later markers tend to be granite or marble, and are usually oriented to face the road. The Hubbard House is a 2-1/2 story frame structure, with a gabled roof, two interior brick chimneys, and a clapboarded exterior. A single-story porch extends across its front, and an ell, possibly older than the main block, extends to the left. The main facade is five bays wide, with a central entrance flanked by pilasters and topped by a transom window set in a corniced entablature. The interior of the house retains a great deal of original woodwork and other finishes, including plaster walls and wooden floors.

The land that is now Shelburne was originally part of the colonial settlement of Deerfield, and was divided amongst that town's proprietors in 1742. The area of the cemetery and house were part of a tract set aside as common land. Permanent settlement began in the late 1750s, and its first meeting house was built sometime before 1769 on the cemetery grounds. Neither it, nor the second meeting house built in 1773, have survived. The cemetery has seen continuous use since the 18th century, and includes many of Shelburne's early settlers. The rate of burials decreased significantly beginning in the 1860s. The Parson Hubbard House was built in the 1770s for Shelburne's first minister, Robert Hubbard. Resistance activities related to Shays' Rebellion in the 1780s took place at the Hubbard house. These are the only major colonial-era historic properties in Shelburne; the meetinghouses from the period that were built in this area have not survived.

== See also ==
- Shelburne Falls Historic District
- National Register of Historic Places listings in Franklin County, Massachusetts
