= Hudson Super Six =

Car model produced by Hudson Motor Company

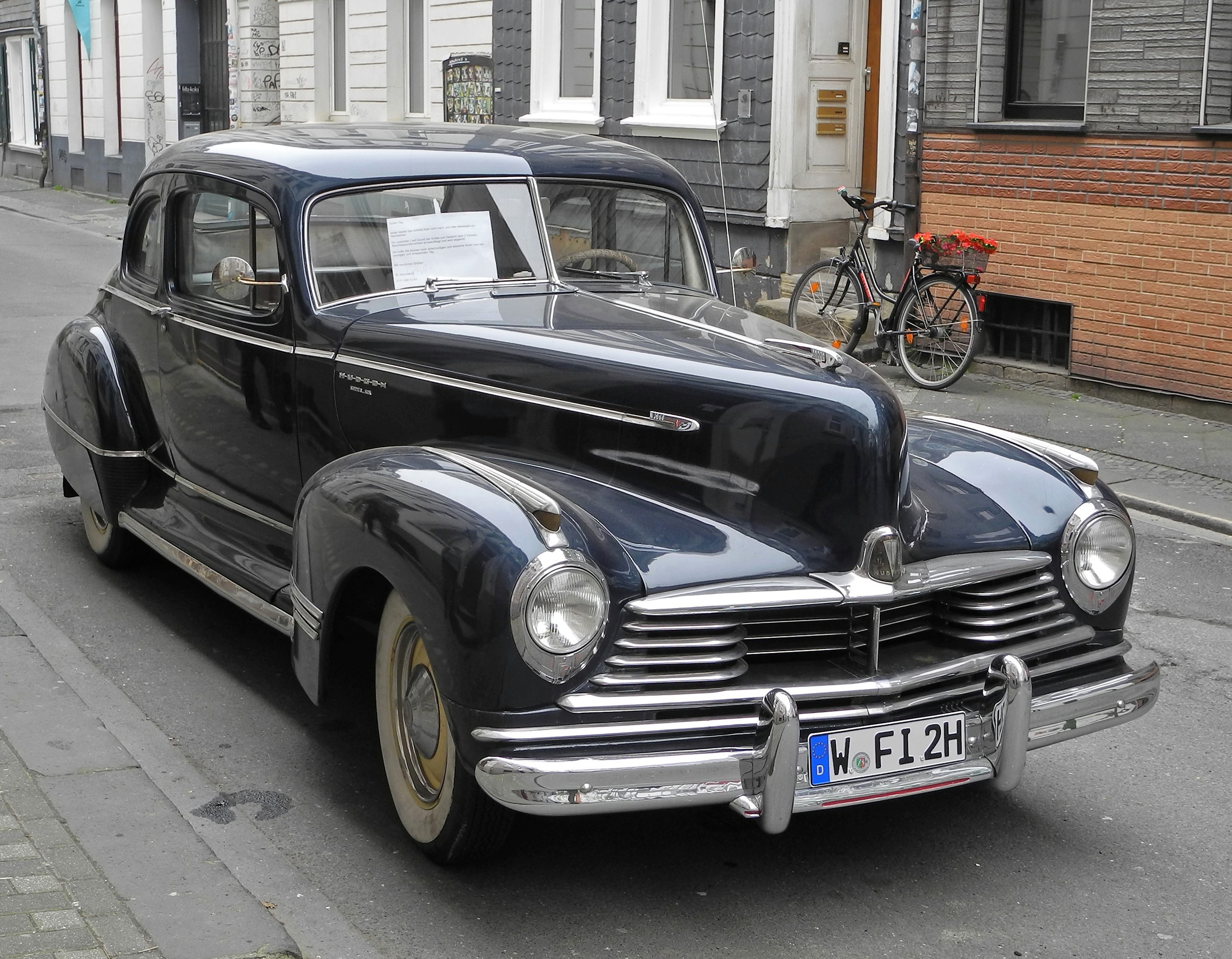
- 1948-1950 Hudson Super Six

Overview
- Manufacturer: Hudson Motor Car Company
- Model years: 1916–1928; 1933; 1940–1942; 1946–1951
- Assembly: Detroit, MI, United States

Body and chassis
- Class: Full-size car
- Layout: FR layout

Chronology
- Successor: Hudson Model R "Greater Hudson" (1929); Hudson Wasp (1952)

The Hudson Super Six is an automobile manufactured by the Hudson Motor Car Company of Detroit, Michigan. The model was introduced in 1916 and remained in production until 1928.

The nameplate was revived for a rebadged Essex in 1933 for a single model year.

The model name returned from 1940 until 1951, aside from the suspension during World War II. The 1951s were called "Hudson Super Custom Six".

== First generation (1916) ==
The first Hudson Super Six was introduced on 16 January 1916, a model that proved to be one of the most famous. Also known as the Series H, the Super Six was an early performance car. Its 288.5 cu in (4.7 L) inline-six developed 76 hp (57 kW), compared to the 40 hp (30 kW) of the equally dimensioned engine fitted to the contemporary Hudson Model Six-40. The breakthrough was the crankshaft featuring integral counterweights that was designed by Hudson's engineer, Howard E. Coffin. The primary limitation of early engines was internal vibration, but the "Super Six" could reach 3,400 rpm, nearly double the speed of its contemporaries.

Before its introduction, Super Sixes made a series of speed runs at Sheepshead Bay Speedway. A new 24-hour record was set at an average speed of 74.9 mph (120.5 km/h), an accomplishment stood until 1931, when a Marmon took it. A super Six achieved a new transcontinental run from San Francisco to New York in 5 days, 3 hours, and 31 minutes - returning after an eight-hour break. In April, the Super Six set a new stock car record for the measured mile, 102.5 mph (165.0 km/h) at Daytona Beach. This was followed by a stock chassis record run up Pikes Peak.

The model series from 1921 to 1923 had a wheelbase of 3187 mm. The six-cylinder engine had a displacement of 6757 cc with a bore of 88.9 mm and a stroke of 127 mm.

=== First retractable hardtop ===
A 1919 Super Six roadster was modified by inventor, Ben P. Ellerbeck, to demonstrate his retractable hardtop roof design. Ellerbeck was granted a patent (No. 1,379,906) on 31 May 1921 and built several scale models to show at the 1922 Automobile Body Builders Exhibition in New York City. Ellerbeck's "flip top' on the Hudson was operated a crank handle located at the rear of the passenger door. When fully lowered, the roof was positioned behind the rear trunk and thus did not impede luggage capacity. When raised, the front of the top went over the windshield giving the appearance of a large air scoop.

=== In popular culture ===
Automobiles are significant to the context of John Steinbeck's novel The Grapes of Wrath. Steinbeck wanted readers to understand class and social standing by including specific makes and models in the novel. The make and condition of the cars are important to the people who took the journey to California as well as revealing a family's socioeconomic status. In The Grapes of Wrath, the Joad family depends on a 1926 Hudson Super Six sedan converted into a truck. It is now difficult for contemporary readers to place cars such as Hudson Super Six in a meaningful social context.

In the 1940 filmatization, the car used is a 1926 Super Six. This car was put into storage after filming ended. After having been discovered in a dilapidated condition, it was converted into a speedster in 2009.

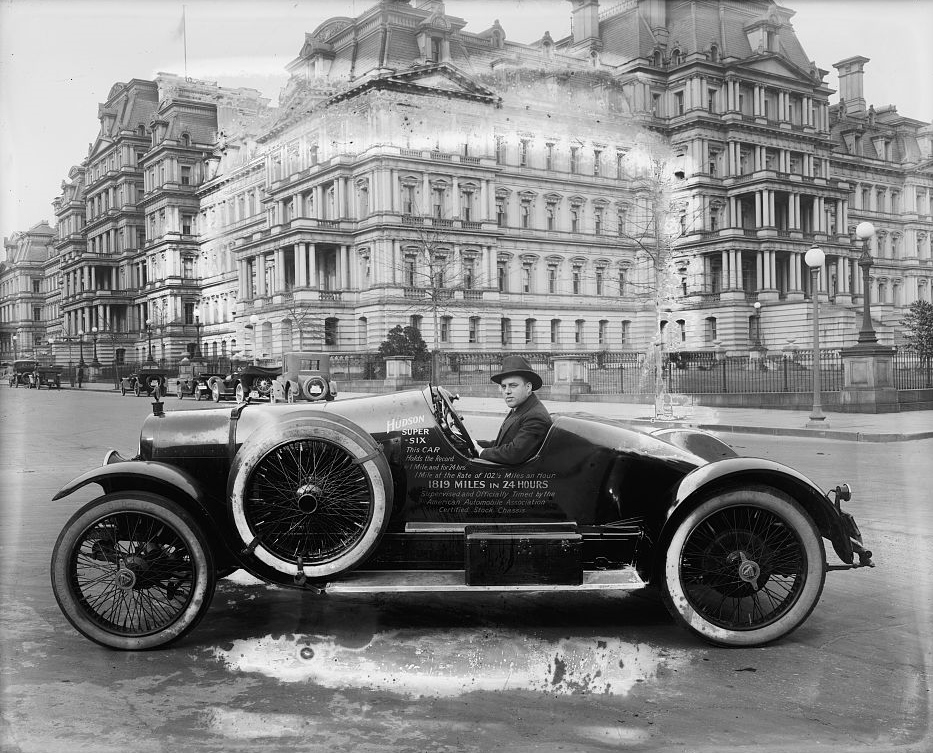
The 24-hour record-setting special-bodied 1916 Hudson Super Six

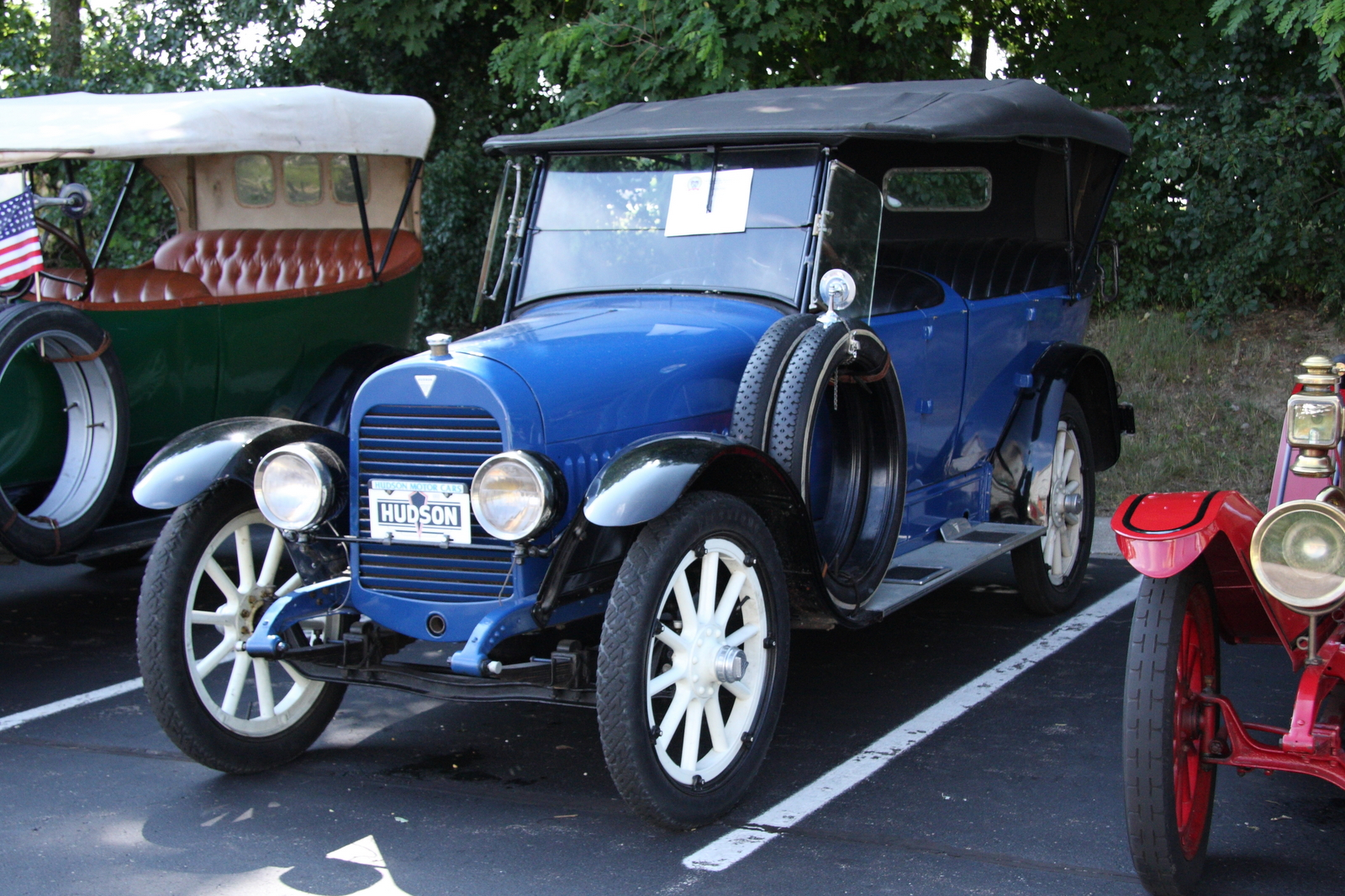
1917 production car (Series J Phaeton)

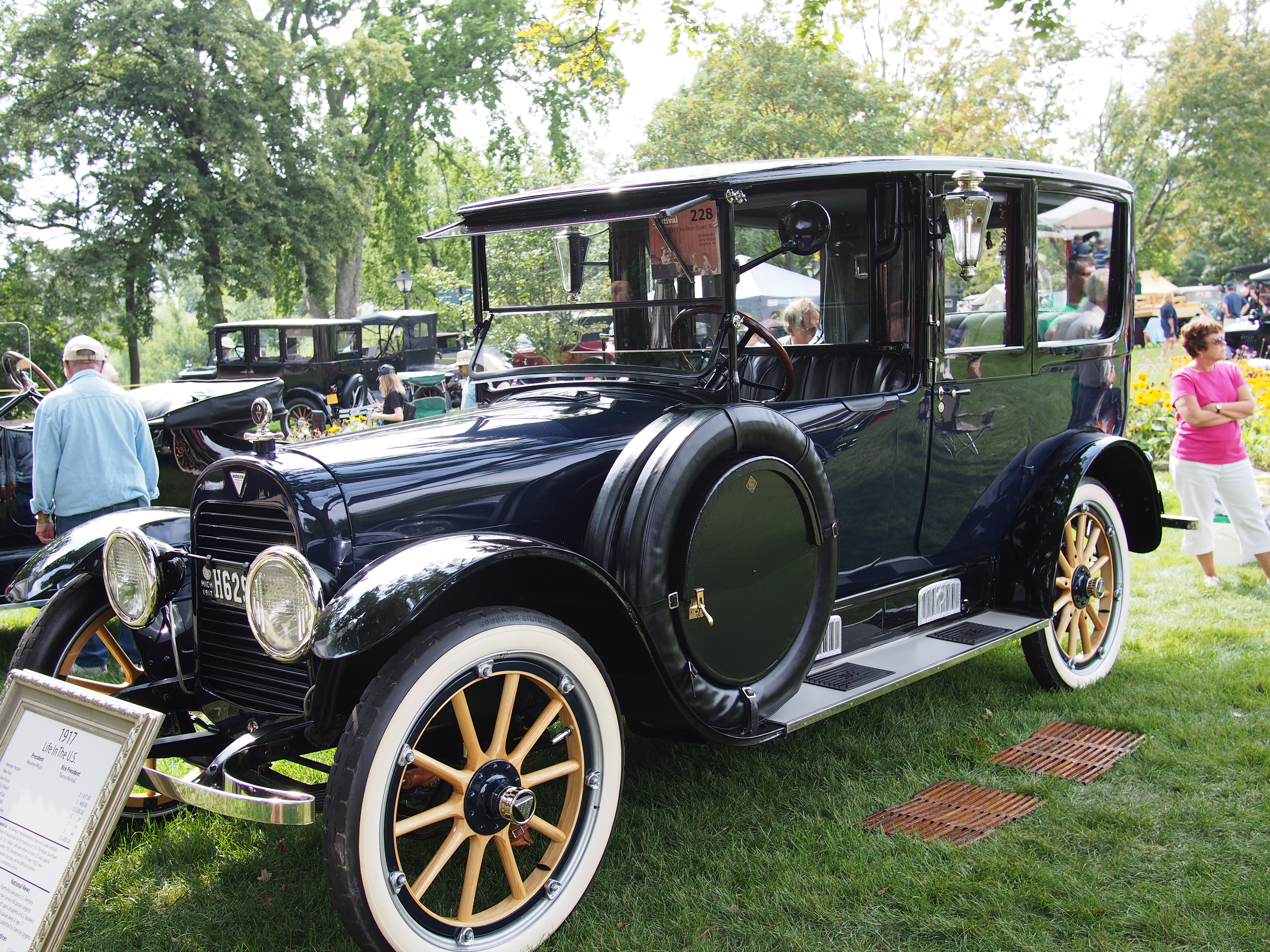
1917 open-drive limousine

== Second generation (1927) ==
For 1927, the Hudson Super Six received a complete redesign including a new F-head engine, 18-inch wood spoke wheels (rather than 21 inches), and four-wheel brakes. The car was lower and generally more stylish, and power increased from 76 to 92 hp (57 to 69 kW). The lower-cost Model R utilized on a 118 1/2 in (3,010 mm) wheelbase, while that of the Model S was 127 3/8 in (3,240 mm) in length. Two standard bodies were available, a two-door Coach and a four-door Sedan. The Model O was also available with five different Custom body styles, made by Biddle and Smart of Massachusetts. The engine was updated in July 1927, with a new manifold and a different head design, including the relocation of the spark plugs and intake valves. Hudson chose not to increase the claimed power, but many consider the stated output to be very conservative.

In 1927, Essex also chose the Super Six label for their cars, while aligning their design with that of the larger Hudsons. Essex kept calling their cars Super Sixes in 1928 and off and on until 1932.

For 1928, the Model O and Model S continued with some styling changes, including a taller and slimmer radiator, larger, more oval headlights, and vertical louvers on the hood. Also new was a standard-bodied Coupe on the Model S chassis, as well as a Biddle and Smart-bodied roadster on the same short wheelbase. Murphy Body of Pasadena designed the custom bodies used on the Model O, although Hudson chose Biddle and Smart to build these designs.

For 1929 the Super Six badge was dropped in favor of the "Greater Hudson" label, and for 1930 all Hudsons had eight-cylinder engines. The 1929 R and L models' wheelbases were stretched by about four inches, the wheels were changed to 19-inch wire wheels, but they carried over the Super Six engine as well as the Murphy-designed/Biddle and Smart-made bodies.

== Third generation (1933) ==
Hudson's lower-positioned sister brand Essex had been using the "Super Six" name since the 1928 model year. The fading Essex brand began in 1932 selling their cars as the "Greater Essex Super-Six," then the "Essex Super-Six Pacemaker", and finally as simply the "Essex Pacemaker."

This car, largely unchanged, was also marketed as the Hudson Super-Six "Pacemaker" in 1933 only, in parallel with the lower-priced Essex-Terraplane, which was kept in production (minus the "Essex" moniker) for 1934.

While the low-cost Essex-Terraplane utilized a 106 in (2,700 mm) wheelbase, the Series E Hudson Super-Six was 113 inches (2,900 mm). The 193.1 cu in (3.2 L) engine produced 73 or 80 hp (54 or 60 kW) depending on the compression ratio.

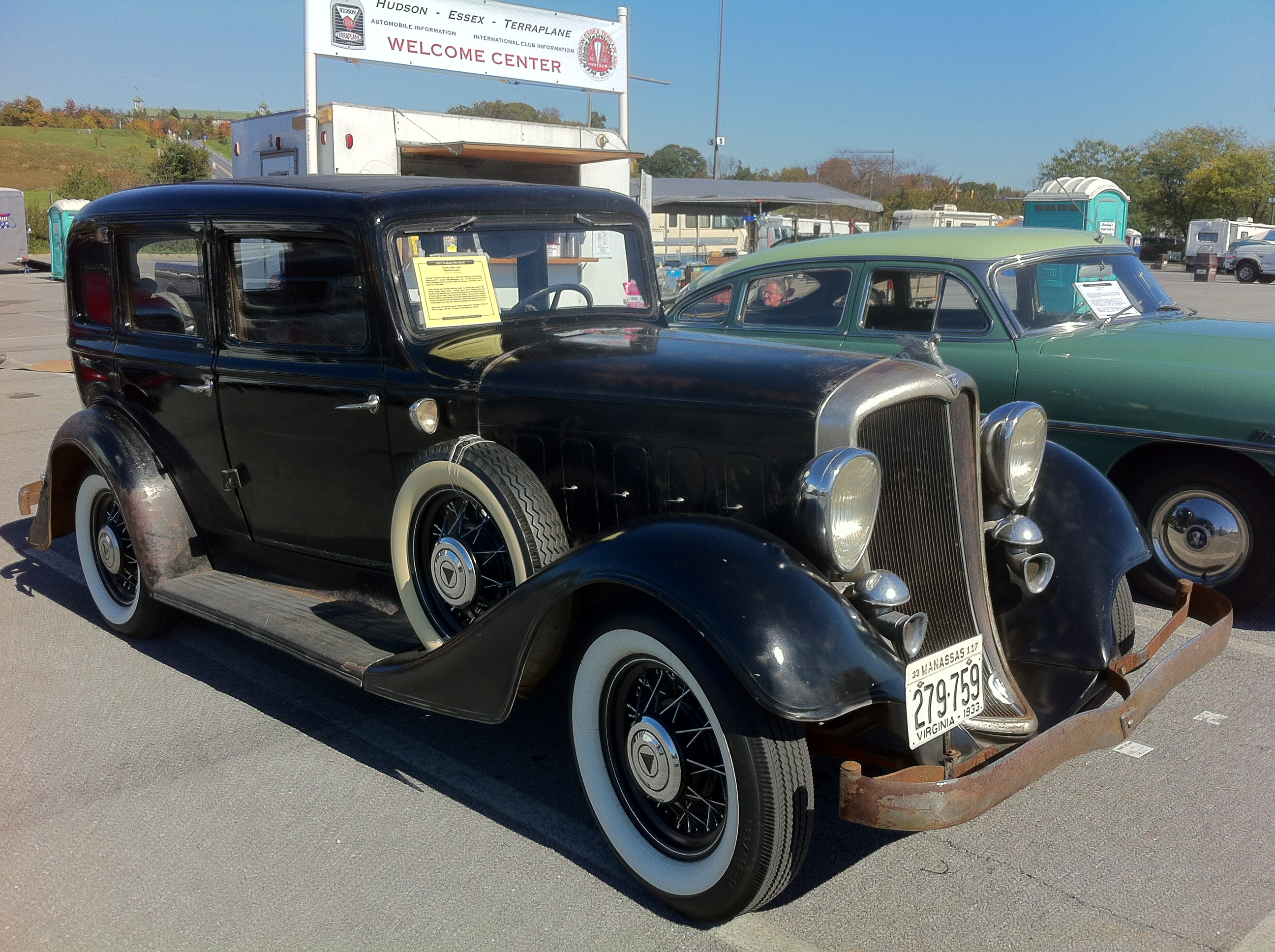
1933 Hudson Super-Six Pacemaker Sedan, a rebadged Essex sold for a single year

== Fourth generation (1940) ==
For the 1940 model year, Hudson reintroduced the "Super Six" nameplate again. This time it sat on a six-cylinder version of the new Hudson Eight, sharing that car's 118 in (3,000 mm) wheelbase. This was five inches longer than that of the regular Hudson Six, which was available as either the Traveler or DeLuxe. The regular Six was called Series 40T and 40P respectively, whereas the Super Six was Series 41. The Super Six also received a larger, 212 cu in (3.5 L) engine with 102 hp (76 kW), ten more than the Hudson Six. This engine was also shared with the large Hudson Country Club Six, with its 125 in (3,200 mm) wheelbase, as well as the Hudson Big Boy series of commercial vehicles.

Body styles were initially a three-passenger Coupe or a five-passenger Victoria Coupe (sharing the same sheetmetal), continuing with a two- or four-door Touring Sedan, and culminating with a two-door Convertible Coupe as well as the two-door Convertible Sedan (seating five people).

Marking the period move towards envelope styling and away from separate fenders, all versions could be had with or without running boards at no extra cost.

The 1941 model year brought a synchronized transmission and electrically controlled overdrive.

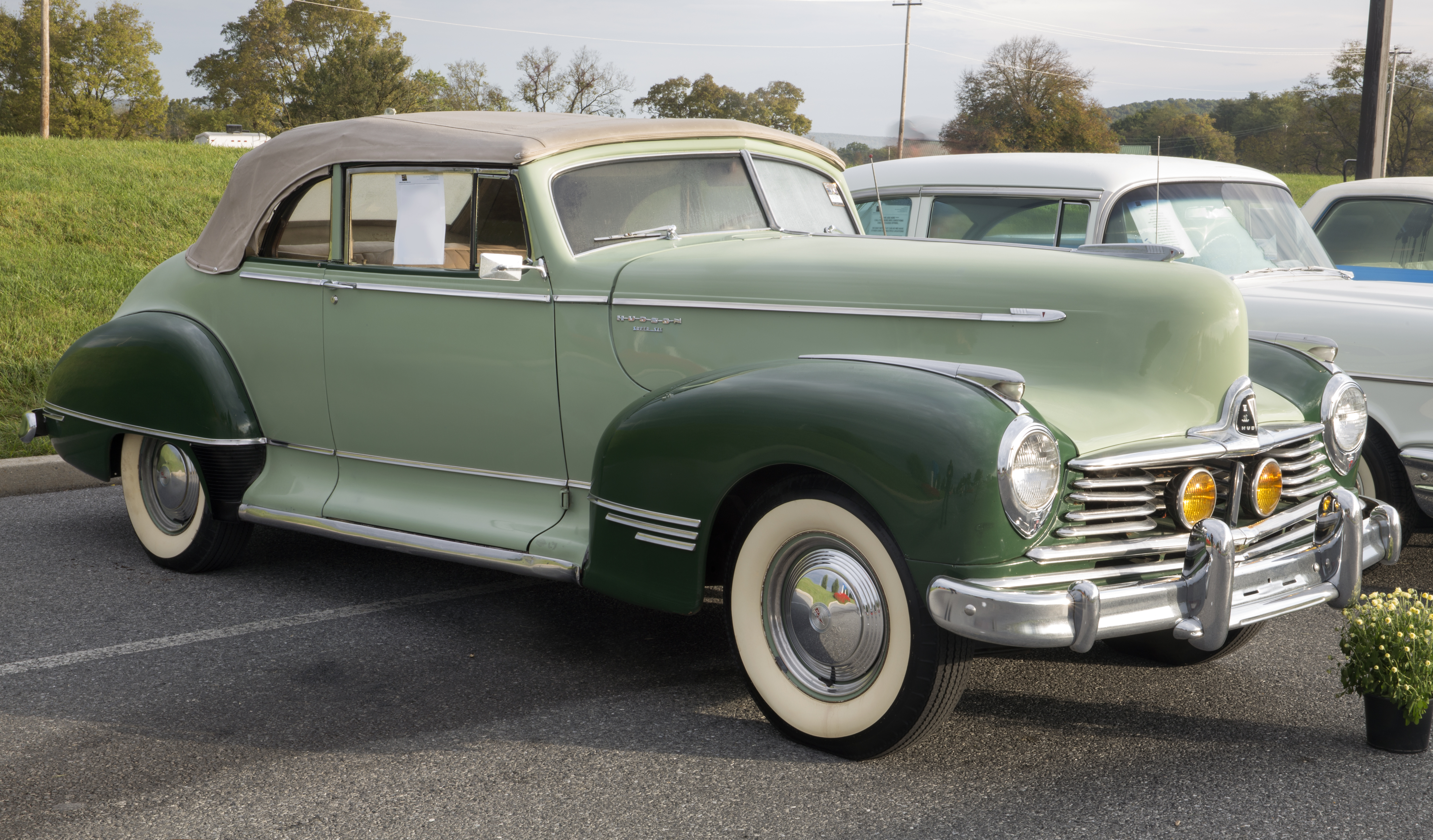
1947 Hudson Super Six convertible

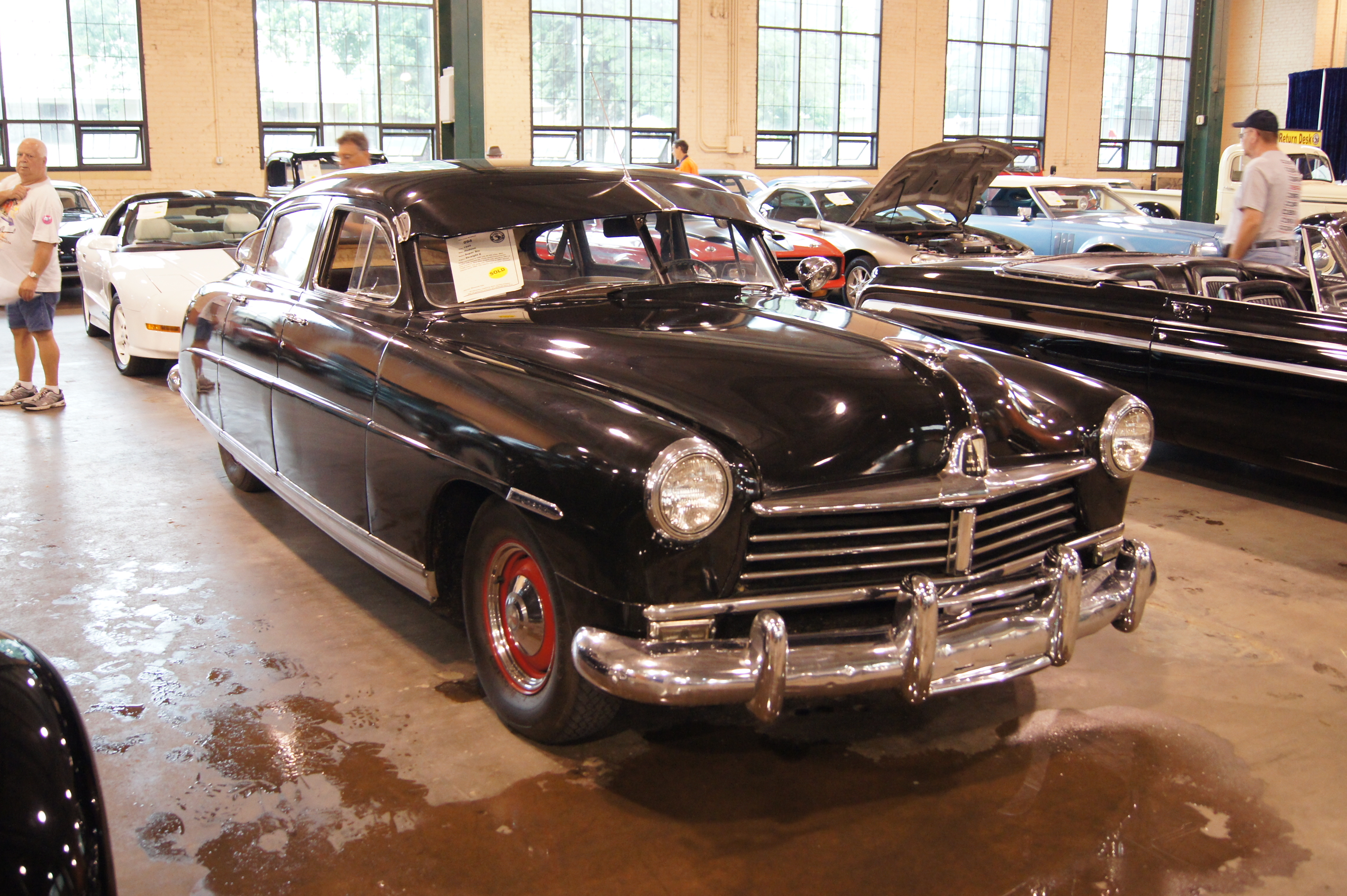
1949 Hudson Super Six Four-Door Sedan

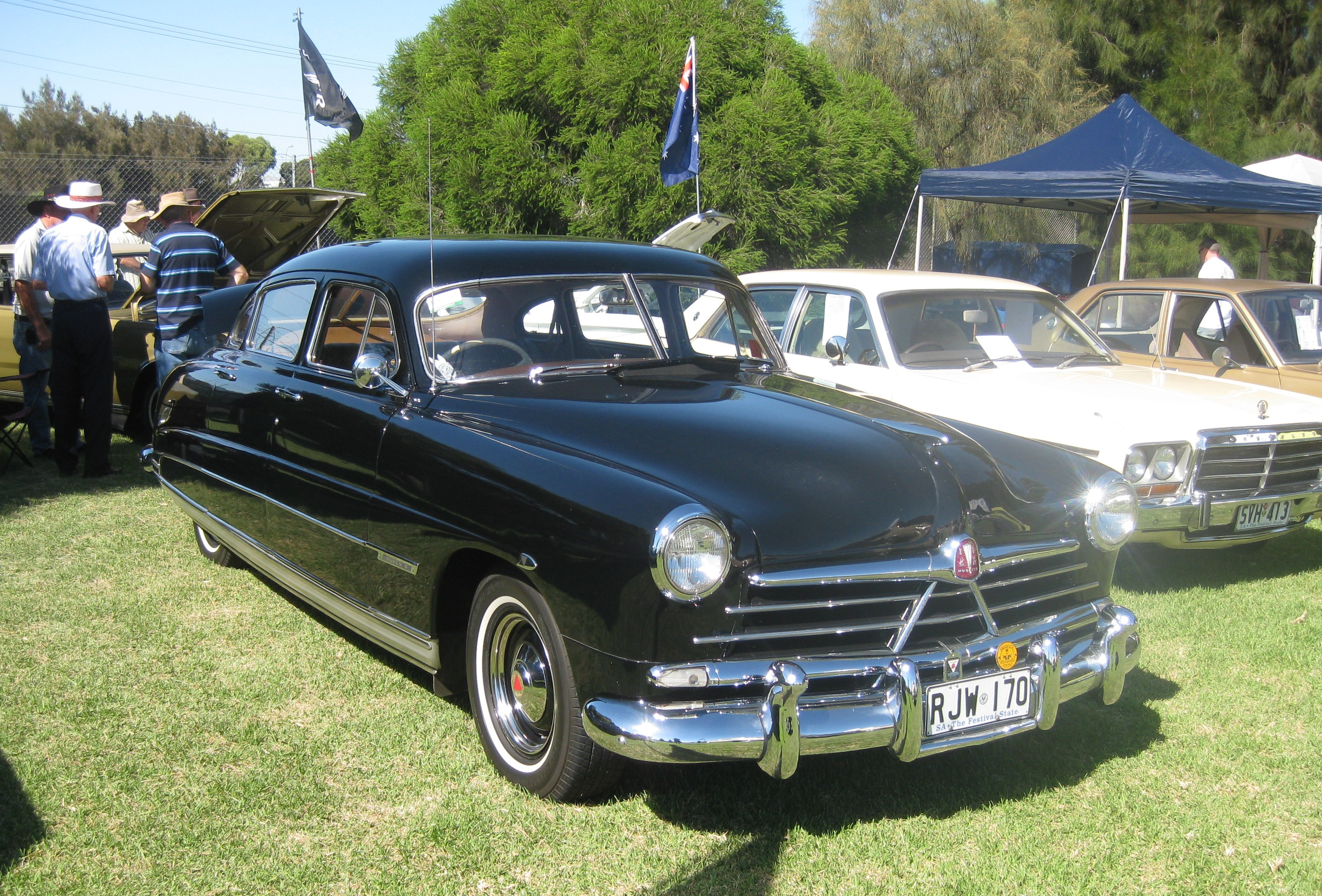
1950 Hudson Super Six four-door sedan with right-hand-drive

== See also ==
- Auto Dollar, a Chinese coin featuring a car that may have been based on the Hudson Super Six
