= Hudson Township =

Hudson Township may refer to:

== Arkansas ==
- Hudson Township, Newton County, Arkansas, in Newton County, Arkansas

== Illinois ==
- Hudson Township, McLean County, Illinois

== Indiana ==
- Hudson Township, LaPorte County, Indiana

== Michigan ==
- Hudson Township, Charlevoix County, Michigan
- Hudson Township, Lenawee County, Michigan
- Hudson Township, Mackinac County, Michigan

== Minnesota ==
- Hudson Township, Douglas County, Minnesota

== Missouri ==
- Hudson Township, Bates County, Missouri
- Hudson Township, Macon County, Missouri

== North Carolina ==
- Hudson Township, Caldwell County, North Carolina, in Caldwell County, North Carolina

== North Dakota ==
- Hudson Township, Dickey County, North Dakota, in Dickey County, North Dakota

== Ohio ==
- Hudson Township, Summit County, Ohio, defunct

== South Dakota ==
- Hudson Township, Edmunds County, South Dakota, in Edmunds County, South Dakota
