= Hudson Township, McLean County, Illinois =

Coordinates: 40°37′02″N 88°59′10″W

Hudson Township
- Township
- Location in McLean County

- McLean County's location in Illinois
- Country: United States
- State: Illinois
- County: McLean
- Established: November 3, 1857

Area
  - Total: 37.8 sq mi (98 km^{2})
  - Land: 36.28 sq mi (94.0 km^{2})
  - Water: 1.51 sq mi (3.9 km^{2}) 3.99%

Population (2010)
  - Estimate (2016): 2,573
  - Density: 70.9/sq mi (27.4/km^{2})
- Time zone: UTC-6 (CST)
  - Summer (DST): UTC-5 (CDT)
- FIPS code: 17-113-36451

Hudson Township is located in McLean County, Illinois. As of the 2010 census, its population was 2,571 and it contained 1,021 housing units.

== Geography ==
According to the 2010 census, the township has a total area of 37.8 square miles (98 km^{2}), of which 36.28 square miles (94.0 km^{2}) (or 95.98%) is land and 1.51 square miles (3.9 km^{2}) (or 3.99%) is water.

== Demographics ==
Historical population
Census	Pop.	Note	%±
2016 (est.)	2,573
U.S. Decennial Census
