= Index of Effluency =

Highest prize awarded at the 24 Hours of LeMons

Index of Effluency (or IOE) is the top prize awarded in the 24 Hours of LeMons automotive racing series. General criteria to win this award is a car that is too unreliable to be driven effectively on the streets yet manages to complete a decent number of laps on the race track. IOE can be awarded to a vehicle that was deemed unreliable from the factory (e.g. Volkswagen Karmann Ghia) or a more reliable car with an unwise engine transplant (e.g. Ford Thunderbird with a BMW diesel engine). The award is named after the "Index of Thermal Efficiency", a prize briefly given in LeMons' namesake the 24 Hours of Le Mans to the car that scored the highest based on a complex formula that took into account car weight, fuel usage and average speed.

== Prize ==
The Index of Effluency title comes with a trophy. Prior to 2010, the trophy varied in design and was often made from recycled automotive parts. Beginning in 2010, the IOE trophy was made from heavy gauge metal and is of a racer running from an inverted car. The base of the trophy is a steel silhouette of a lemon, the series' logo. Laminated to the base is a printed label of the race name and year.

Along with the fame comes a cash prize, generally paid in the form of a standard, bank issued check written by race organizer John "Jay" Lamm but occasionally paid, as is the winner on laps, in nickels. When local banks do not have enough coins in stock to pay the winner on laps, checks are drawn, but usually on a medium that makes a winner's bank deposit an embarrassing experience (i.e. a toilet seat). However, IOE winners are frequently spared this layer of ridicule.

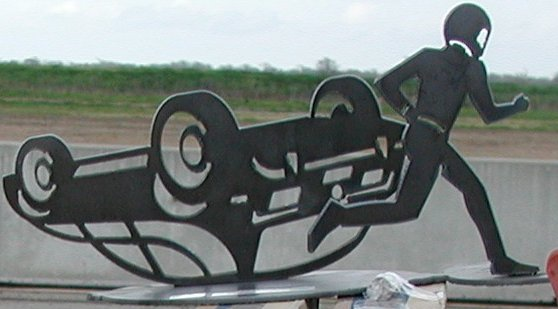
IoE Trophy

The amount of the IOE prize has changed over the years. In 2008 and 2009, the prize was $500. In 2010, in order to raise the significance of the Index of Effluency over that of winning the race outright (completing the most number of laps), the IOE prize was raised to $1501, one dollar more than the then-current race-winning prize of $1500. As the prize awards for winning the race outright and/or winning different race classes have changed over time, the IOE prize has continued to be set at one dollar more than the next-highest prize amount, to emphasize the IOE's status as the highest award in LeMons.

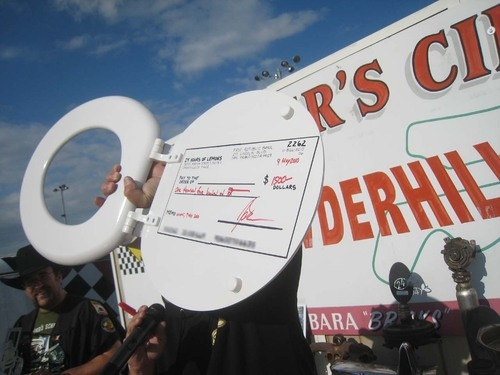
Check written on a toilet seat

== Previous winners ==
Superscript numbers indicate a team's cumulative Index of Effluency wins in the list below; the first win is unmarked.

=== 2007 ===
Race	Team	Car
Detroit	One Night Stand Endurance Team	Chevrolet Cavalier Wagon
Altamont	Ecurie Ecrappe	Alfa Romeo Spider
Arse-Freeze-Apaloosa	Size Matters	Plymouth Fury

=== 2008 ===
Race	Team	Car
Altamont	Autobahn Society Racing	BMW 2002
LeMons South	Tunachuckers	1966 Volvo 122
LeMons New England	Chard Beef Racing	Buick Regal
LeMons Detroit(ish)	The 98ers	Oldsmobile 98
Yee-Haw It's LeMons Texas!	Never Give Up	BMW 1600-2
Arse-Freeze-Apaloosa	Team B210 Racing	Datsun B210

=== 2009 ===
Race	Team	Car
Gator-O-Rama	Opular Dependence	1972 Opel GT (with GM V6), MSR Houston
South Spring	Heavy Metal	Ford LTD
Goin' For Broken	Redneck Racing	1991 Cadillac Eldorado
Laissez Les Crapheaps Roulez	LeMons of Club GP	1997 Pontiac Grand Prix SE
New England	Team UDMan-Trailing Throttle Oversteer	1963 Chevrolet Corvair
Buttonwillow Histrionics	San Diego Minis (a.k.a. Team Bean)	1962 Austin Mini
South Fall	Rusty Bolt Racing	BMW 530i
The Lamest Day	Total Loss Racing	1987 AvtoVaz Lada Signet
Yee-Haw It's LeMons Texas	Black Knight Racing (It's Just a Flesh Wound)	Triumph TR7
Arse-Freeze-Apalooza	Purple LeMons Racing	Volkswagen Beetle

=== 2010 ===
Race	Team	Car
Auction-Weekend Gavel-Tap GP	Team Flyin' Four-Door Fortress	Oldsmobile 98 Regency Brougham
Southern Discomfort	Track Pillagerz	Buick LeSabreTooth
Gator-O-Rama	LRE (LeMons Racing Experiment)	Datsun 240Z.
Sears Pointless	Air Prance Oui-We-Can	1971 Citroen D Super
American Irony	Chicken and Waffles	Volkswagen Quantum Syncro wagon.
Cain't Get Bayou	Mostly Harmless Racing	Volkswagen Karmann Ghia
Goin' For Broken	Dust N Debris	Dodge Shadow
South Spring	Schumacher Taxi Service: Craptation Regurgitation	Chevy Citation
North Dallas Hooptie	Crewe Le Pew Redeaux	Renault Le Car
Capitol Offense	Misfit Toys Racing	Wartburg 311
The B.F.E. GP	Rocket Surgery Racing	Renault 4CV
LeMons New England	Police Brutality, Speedycop	1963 Ford Thunderbird Turbodiesel
The Arse-Sweat-Apalooza	King Henry V8th	Cadillac Sedan de Ville
Mutually Assured Destruction of Omaha	Airborne Ranger Race Team	Chevrolet Beretta
Yee-Haw It's LeMons Texas!	Seven Come Eleven	Volkswagen Fastback
LeMons South Fall	Dog Ciao Racing	Alfa Romeo Spider
Detroit Bull Oil GP	Scuderia Arugginito	Alfa Romeo Berlina
The Rod Blagojevich Never-Say-Die 500	SpeedyCop^{2}	Toyota MR2/Lancia Scorpion
Laissez Les Crapheaps Roulez	Property Devaluation Racing	Ford Fairmont wagon
LeMons Arse-Freeze-Apalooza	Italian Stallions-The Blue Meanie	Fiat 600D
The Painfully Bland Bowl of Thin Lukewarm Oatmeal That Can't Possibly Offend Anyone, No Matter How Much They Enjoy Being Offended, 24-Hour Season Ender	Adopted by Jets 2	Saab 96

=== 2011 ===
Race	Team	Car
The Real Hoopties of New Jersey	Gormless Racing	1968/73 MGB GT
American Irony	Zero Budget Racing	1982 Chevrolet Chevette Diesel
BOSTON TOW PARTY AND OVERHEAD-CAM BAKE	Team Speedycop and the Gang of Outlaws^{3}	1980 Pontiac Bonneville DONK

=== 2012 ===
Race	Team	Car
Yee-Haw It's LeMons Texas	Team Sensory Assault	1972 Mazda RX2
Southern Discomfort	Flirtin With Disaster OL' Chuck Gots Gu	1991 Buick Rea-ta-ta
Sears Pointless	Oly Express	1964 Plymouth Valiant
The Real Hoopties of New Jersey	3 Pedal Mafia	1971 Sea Sprite 16'
Campaign to Prevent Gingervitis	LemonAid Racing	1996 GEO Metro
Loudon Annoying	Speedycop & The Gang of Outlaws^{4}	1996 Suzuki X-90
North Dallas Hooptie	Speedy Monzales	1980 Chevy Monza
The B.F.E. GP	Speedycop & The Gang of Outlaws^{5}	1978 AMC Pacer
Showroom-Schlock Shootout	SchnitzelWagen	1970 Volkswagen Squareback
Capitol Offense	World Class Motorsports Livers	1990 Geo Storm
Arse-Sweat-Apalooza	Team Tinworm	1959 Humber Super Snipe
Pacific Northworst GP	Freewheelin' Pikers	1967 SAAB 96
The Chubba Cheddar Enduro	Prince of Darkness	1970 MGB GT
Vodden The Hell Are We Doing?	LICENSED TO ILL	1984 Chevy S10
LeMons South Fall	NSF Racing	1945 Mercedes 170
Gator-O-Rama	Team Green Coronet	1972 Dodge Coronet
American Irony	Dos Limons	1979 Ford Fiesta
Halloween Hooptiefest	Dirty Penny Race Team	1979 Datsun 210
Arse-Freeze-Apalooza	PIT CREW REVENGE 2	1984 Cadillac Eldorado
2012 Season Ender: Heaps In the Heart of Texas	Der Weinerschteppers LeMini Autosarcopha	1962 Austin Mini

=== 2013 ===
Race	Team	Car
Southern Discomfort	Speedycop & The Gang of Outlaws^{6}	1956 Cessna 310
Sears Pointless	Flaming A-Holes	1964 Sunbeam Imp
Sears (Even More) Pointless	New York Rock Exchange	2003 Ford Focus
There Goes the Neighborhood	Rally Baby Racing	1975 AMC Whorenet
The Cure for Gingervitis	Zero Budget Racing^{2}	1981 Isuzu I-Mark diesel
North Dallas Hooptie	Teamgravy Racing	1974 Porsche 914/4
Loudon Annoying	3 Pedal Mafia^{2}	1980 Triumph TR7
The B.F.E. GP	RocketSurgery^{2}	1978 Checker Marathon
Doing Time in Joliet	Futility Motorsports	1979 Mercury Bobcat
Capitol Offense	Austin Powerless	1975 Austin Marina
Button Turrible	Planned Obsolescence	1979 Buick Skyhawk
Pacific Northworst GP	Chase Race: The Best Damn Garage in LeMo	1952 Hudson Hornet
Real Hoopties of New Jersey	Speedycop & The Gang of Outlaws^{7}	1992 Geo Metro Limo
Vodden the Hell Are We Doing	LOL Racing	1971 Volvo 1800e
LeMons South Fall	Idle Clatter	1979 Mercedes-Benz 300SD
Gator-O-Rama	Escape Velocity Racing	1964 Dodge Dart
Halloween Hooptiefest	3 Pedal Mafia^{3}	1969 Rolls-Royce Silver Shadow
Chubba Cheddar Enduro	Majicbus Racing-K It Forward	1987 Plymouth Reliant K
Arse-Freeze-Apalooza	The AMCI Starletans	1982 Toyota Starlet

=== 2014 ===
Race	Team	Car
Shine Country Classic	Knoxvegas Lowballers	1991 GEO Metro SVT
NASA We Have a Problem 2-Hour Sprint	Hella Shitty Racing	1971 Volkswagen Super Beetle
North Dallas Hooptie	The Syndicate - SLC non-paying auto jur	1976 Mercedes SLC
Sears Pointless	Panting Polar Bear Racing 2	1961 AMC Rambler Classic
The Cure for Gingervitis	Flux Decapitators Part II	1992 Ford Tempo
Southern Discomfort	NSF Racing^{2}	1956 Ford Convertible
The Real Hoopties of New Jersey	Super Grover	1969 Rover P6B 3500
Return of the LeMonites	Grumpy Cat Racing	1950 Dodge Truck
Button Turrible	idioti curse o masina pentru idioti	1968 Dacia 1100
The Humidi TT	Team Fairlylame	1964 Ford Fairlane
Pacific Northworst GP	FFLAT	1985 Peugeot 505 S
Doing Time in Joliet	Afunzalo Racing	1974 Fiat X19
There Goes the Neighborhood	Prompt Critical	1974 Mercury Capri
The B.F.E. GP	Volatile RAM 2	1987 Toyota MR2/Corolla
Vodden the Hell Are We Doing?	PeugeotDaddy	1963 Peugeot 404
LeMons South Fall	Speedycop & The Gang of Outlaws^{8}	1987 Ford Awesomeness
Where the Elite Meet to Cheat	Team Sheen	1981 Dodge Mirada
Halloween Hooptiefest	Futility Motorsport^{2}	1989 Dodge Daytona
Gator-O-Rama	The Resistance	1975 Honda Civic
Arse-Freeze-Apalooza	Rustang	1971 muatang ugly coupe

=== 2015 ===
Race	Team	Car
Good Effort Grand Prix	Spank the Builder and the Can-Do Crew	Austin Mini Moke
Shine Country Classic	NSF Racing^{3}	1959 Studebaker Silver Hawk
Sears Pointless	Rancho de Llama	1966 Volvo 122
The Cure for Gingervitis	Bad Decisions Racing	1995 Pontiac Trans Sport
Southern Discomfort	Schumacher Taxi Service^{2}	Toyota MR2
The Real Hoopties of New Jersey	Sinical Racing 3	1973 Volkswagen Super Beetle
The B.F.E. GP	Pit Stain	1980 Toyota Corolla
Button Turrible	-ing with Additional Bad Ideas	1964 Austin maybe Morris Mini
Pacific Northworst GP	Metrosexual Viking Funeral	1982 MG Metro 1300
Doing Time in Joliet	Morrows Racing	1993 Chevy Lumina APV
There Goes the Neighborhood	Interceptor Motorsports	1983 Renault Fuego Turbo
Vodden the Hell Are We Doing?	Ran When Parked Racing	1976 Oldsmobile Omega
LeMons South Fall	Idle Clatter Racing^{2}	1982/1979 Toyocedes Hilux 300SRD
Return of the LeMonites	Premature combustion	1960 Studebaker Lark 8
Where the Elite Meet to Cheat	Double Jeopardy	1987 Jaguar XJS
Halloween Hooptiefest	Lemontarians	1981 Chevy Citation
Gator-O-Rama	NSF Racing^{4}	1999 Chrysler Sebring
Arse-Freeze-Apalooza	The Supranos	1970 Toyota Corona

=== 2016 ===
Race	Team	Car
Shine Country Classic	J CrewD	1985 Jagaur XJ6
Sears Pointless	Faster Farms XIV	1966 Plymouth Belvedere II
Arizona D-Bags	Aigo!! Eojjeoji??	1986 Hyundai Excel
North Dallas Hooptie	Ratsun Racing	1978 Datsun B210ZX
The Cure for Gingervitis	Mity Metro	1990 Geo Metro convertible
Southern Discomfort	Lunar Lemon	1986 Chevy Astro
Real Hoopties of New Jersey	3 Pedal Mafia^{4}	1973 Citroen S&M
Vodden the Hell Are We Doing?	Spank Squat	1986 Yugo Screwyourself
The B.F.E. GP	the furious four	1981 Toyota Celica GT
Doing Time in Joliet	Northern Shiners	1986 Oldsmobile Cutlass
Arse-Sweat-Apalooza	Hella Shitty Racing^{2}	1974 Bricklin SV-1
GP du Lac Chargoggagoggmanchauggagoggchaubunagungamaugg	Sabrina Duncan's Revenge	1977 Ford Pinto
Pacific Northworst GP	R. Loewy Racing	1963 Studebaker Avanti
LeMons South Fall	NSF Racing^{5}	1967 Pontiac LeMans GTO
Button Turrible	Team Tinworm^{2}	1964 Humber Super Snipe
A Decade of Disappointment	Bad Decisions Racing^{2}	1948 Plymouth Sedan
Halloween Hooptiefest	Great Globs of Oil //Bratva	1978 Buick/Opel Isuzu
Houston We Have a Problem	Team Radicus	1978 Oldsmobile Ninety Eight
Arse-Freeze-Apalooza	Four Yak Press Racing	1952 Willys Aero-Lark

=== 2017 ===
Race	Team	Car
Shine Country Classic	Knoxvegas Lowballers^{2}	1988 Mercedes 560SL
Sears Pointless	Re-Start Racing	1991 Ford Ranger
Arizona D-Bags	Blue Swede	1961 Volvo PV544
The Cure for Gingervitis	Ultra Depends Racing	1981 Chevy Monte Carlo
Southern Discomfort	Duff Beer	1981 Jet Electric 007
Texas Tippin'	Team Lowball	1974 AMC Gremlin
The Real Hoopties of New Jersey	Speedycop & The Gang of Outlaws^{9}	1996 Suzuki Mystery Box
Vodden the Hell Are We Doing?	Pony Keg	1986 Oldsmobile Cutlass Supreme Brougham Horse
The B.F.E. GP	down and out race team	1978 AMC Pacer
Kentucky (Demo) Derby	Speedycop & The Gang of Outlaws^{10}	1977 Ridiculous Racecar
Doing Time in Joliet	Team Anarchy	1993 Dodge Shadow
Arse-Sweat-Apalooza	Los Huevos Rancheros	1962 Ford Ranchero
GP du Lac Chargoggetcetera	Lemontarians^{2}	1985 Cadillac DeVille
Pacific Northworst GP	Transcontinental Drifters	1991 Toyota Previa
Lemons South Fall	NSF Racing^{6}	1985 Pontiac Parsiline-ish
Button Turrible	Ran When Parked Racing Entry C^{2}	1971 VW 411
Where the Elite Meet to Cheat	Burnt Rubber Soul Racing	1981 Imperial
Halloween Hooptiefest	Olga and the Engineers	1987 Mercedes 300E
Houston We Have a Problem	Team Lowball^{2}	1974 AMC Gremlin
Arse-Freeze-Apalooza	PIT CREW REVENGE^{2}	2002 Pontiac Aztek
The Kim Harmon Scrotium 500	Duff Beer^{2}	1981 Mercedes 240D

=== 2018 ===
Race	Team	Car
Shine Country Classic	The Wonderment Consortium	1988 Chrysler Conquest TSi
Arizona D-Bags	ONSET/Tetanus Racing	1963 Volvo 544
Sears Pointless at HooptieCon Confusingly Presented by Yokohama	Low Road Racing	1976 Pontiac Sunbird
Cain't Git Bayou	Ratsun Racing^{2}	1986 Fierorrari F40
The Yokohama Joliet Prison Break	The Wonderment Consortium^{2}	1991 Hyundai Scoupe LS
Southern Discomfort	Low Dollar Escorts	1988 Ford Escort
Real Hoopties of New Jersey	Interceptor Motorsports^{2}	1976 Plymouth Gran Fury
Vodden the Hell Are We Doing Devilishly Presented by Yokohama	RUN-CRV	2001 Honda CRV
The B.F.E. GP	The DreadNots	1976 Plymouth Arrow
The Cure for Gingervitis	Rust Belt Racing	1977 Toyota Celica
Pacific Northworst GP	Silversleeves Racing	1964 MG 1100 Sports Saloon
GP du Lac Chargoggagogg(etcetera)	ranger train	1995 Ford Ranger
Button Turrible Bafflingly Presented by Yokohama	Ran When Parked Racing Entry B^{3}	1987 Cadillac Allante
Where the Elite Meet to Cheat	Heads you Win Tails we Lose. Again.	1994 Lincoln Mark VIII
Smells Like AMC Spirit	Team Lowball^{3}	1982 AMC Spirit
Halloween Hooptiefest	Top Off Racing	1986 VW Cabriolet
Get Yer Phil 500	Salty Thunder Racing	1985 Pontiac Fiero
Lemons South Fall	Duff Beer^{3}	1981 Mercedes 240D
Yokohama Stuntin' & Splodin' Soiree	Escape Velocity Racing^{2}	2459 Some Kind Old Hooptie
Arse-Freeze-Apalooza	Bodge Engineering	1991 Sterling 827SL
The Yokohama 500 350 100 Good Try	Knoxvegas Lowballers^{3}	1980 Triumph TR8

=== 2019 ===
Race	Team	Car
Shine Country Classic	Slant Six	1964 Plymouth Valiant Signet
Arizona D-Bags	A fist full of cotter pins	1961 Borgward Isabella coupe
Sears Pointless @ HooptieCon Confusingly Presented by Yokohama	Opile: A Black Iron Project.	1967 Opel Kadett
Cain't Git Bayou	Hi Hungry I'm Dad!	1993 Chrysler Lebaron
Doing Time In Joliet	S Car Go	1990 Oldsmobile Cutlass Ciera S
The Pitt Maneuver	RUST CARTEL	1965 Ford Fairlane
Southern Discomfort (Full 24 Hrs)	Senior Citizens Club of America	1978 Datsun B210GX
Yokohama 5-Mile Tyre Festival	The Black Flags	1983 Toyota Celica Supra
Real Hoopties of New Jersey @ HooptieCon Presented by Yokohama	sinical racing^{2}	1950 Hudson Pacemaker
The B.F.E. GP	Tommy Salami and the Meat Wagon	1989 Daewoo-Pontiac-Opel-Vauxhall-Passport-Asuna Lemans-Astra-Kadett-Optima-GT
Rust Belt GP Presented by Autoweek	Team Shell Shocked	1976 AMC Gremlin
Pacific Northworst GP	Maple Bacon	1987 Chevrolet Caprice
GP du Lac Chargoggagogg(etcetera)	WeLikeTheTunaHere	1997 Chevy Monte Carlo (identifies as a Supra)
Heartland Parked	Real Racin® @ Black Iron ""Racing	1973 Toyota Chinook
Lemons South Fall	Skip-A-Gear Racing	1983 Mitsubishi Starion
High Plains Drifter	why would you do that?	1986 Chevrolet Chevette
Button Turrible	ShortBus Racing	2004 Jeep Grand Cheorkee
The Minneapolis 500	United Partnership of Pentastar Racers	1992 Plymouth Sundance Duster
Smells Like AMC Spirit	Jeep Tricks	1989 Jeep Cherokee
Tony Swan Never Say Die Memorial	Pacific Motors	1977 Rolls Royce Silver Wraith II
Halloween Hooptiefest	PunisherGP	1989 Peugeot 405
Yokohama Stuntin' & Splodin' Soiree	11% Racing	1981 Fiat X1/9
Arse-Freeze-Apalooza	Racer	2005 Chevy Aveo
The Yokohama Coldlanta 500	ONSET/Tetanus Racing^{2}	1973 Datsun 240Z

=== 2020 ===
Race	Team	Car
Shine Country Classic	Team NoNakedTires	1978 Ford Pinto
La Carrera Arizona	Gate Crashers	1991 Toyota Previa
The Rust Belt GP	Gorilla Greasers	1972 Plymouth Valian
Pacific Northworst GP	Piston Liberation Front	1959 Jaguar Mk1
GP du Lac Chargoggagogg(etcetera)	The Rootes of All Evil	1958 Sunbeam Rapier
The Lemons Block Party (Full 24 Hrs)	Semi-Sentient Centenarians	1996 BMW-uick Century
High Plains Drifter (Full 24 Hrs)	Ran Outta Talent Racing	1996 Geo Metr0
Button Turrible bafflingly Presented by Yokohama	Le Citron	1977 Pontiac LeMons
The Tony Swan Never-Say-Die Memorial	Brown Rubber Soul Racing	1981 Mazda 626
Halloween Hooptiefest	Oscars Junk Heap	1974 AMC Javelin
Yokohama Stuntin' & Splodin' Soiree	Squaaaad Racing	1979 Volvo 242 GT

=== 2021 ===
Race	Team	Car
Cain't Git Bayou	Team Eaux	1977 Dodge MonacEAUX
Yokohama Sears Pointless	McDads/A FART Racing	1977 Lancia Scorpion
The Pitt Maneuver	Cheesebolt Enterprises	1987 Ford Tempo LX 2-door
Yokohama Southern Discomfort	NSF Racing^{7}	2004 Chrysler Sebring
Yokohama Days of Thunderhill	Scuderia Limoni	1969 Alfa Romeo Berlina
THE B.F.E. GP	Caddy Daddy Racing	1981 Volkswagen Rabbit Pickup
Yokohama Real Hoopties of New Jersey	Tom Tully's Buillac	1937 Buick Century
The Rust Belt GP	Freeze Farms Racing	1995 Chevy S10
Pacific Northworst GP	go kart homies	1997 Mercury Grand Marquis
GP du Lac Chargoggagogg(etcetera)	Valve Tap Racing	1978 Chrysler Cordoba
Doing Time in Joliet	Fireball Racing	1967 Ford Fairlane
High Plains Drifter 2021 (Full 24 Hrs)	Dirty Racers	1991 Chevrolet S10
Lemons South Fall	Off-Kilter Racing	1962 Plymouth Valiant
Yokohama Button Turrible	B Team - Just Plain Stupid	1974 Lotus Chotus
The Tony Swan Never-Say-Die Memorial	Little Enos Racing	1994 Ford Tempo GL
Halloween Hooptiefest	Elmo's Revenge	1996 Saturn SW2
Yokohama Stuntin' & Splodin' Soiree	The Resistance^{2}	1980 Honda Civic Wagon
Yokohama Arse-Freeze-Apalooza	Ran When Parked Racing Entry D^{4}	1974 Plymouth Satellite
The Kim Harmon Scrotium 500	8 hiks	1999 Chevy Malibu

=== 2022 ===
Race	Team	Car
Shine Country Classic	Event Horizon	1980 Plymouth Horizon
Yokohama Sears Pointless	Team Apathy	1971 Honda 600
Cain't Git Bayou	BLACK UN_BEAUTY	1977 Chrysler Imperial
The Pitt Maneuver	Pat-a-PaLemons	2000 Buick LeSabre
Yokohama Lemons Block Party	it'll be fine...	1993 Eagle Summit Wagon
Yokohama Days of Thunderhill	Dirty Duck Racing	1983 VW Rabbit
The B.F.E. GP	Skid-Do	1981 Toyota Starlet
Yokohama Real Hoopties of New Jersey	EL chupacabra	1989 Ford Fiesta
The Rust Belt GP	Stranger Danger and the Ruckus Rangers	1965 Chevy Corvair
Pacific Northworst GP	Zitronen Kommando	1999 Porsche 996
GP du Lac Chargoggagogg(etcetera)	Tunachuckers^{2}	1966 Volvo Amazon
Doing Time in Joliet	TDIsore “Racing”	2003 VW Jetta TDI
High Plains Drifter 2022 (Full 24 Hrs)	why would you do that?^{2}	1986 Chevy Chevette
Lemons South Fall	Test Card F	1980 Rover SD1
Yokohama Button Turrible	Ran When Parked Racing^{5}	1973 Chevrolet El Camino 454 SS
The Tony Swan Never-Say-Die Memorial	Kenosha Kickers	1967 AMC Ambassador
Smells Like AMC Spirit	Piston Liberation Front^{2}	1958 Edsel Corsair
Halloween Hooptiefest	Flatball Racing	1977 Lancia Scorpion
Yokohama Stuntin' & Splodin' Soiree	Team Lowball^{4}	1974 AMC Gremlin
Yokohama Arse-Freeze-Apalooza	Knucklehead Racing	1977 Dodge Aspen
The Kim Harmon Scrotium 500	Jeff Gorton's Racing	1997 Chevrolet Monte Carlo Z34

=== 2023 ===
Race	Team	Car
Shine Country Classic	SMOKIN' HOT FLASHES	1995 Mercedes 280sl
Yokohama 3 Tracks 1 Race	Scooby Dooby	2020 Pontiac Transmaro
Cain't Git Bayou	PUROLATOR THE URINATOR	1975 Mercury Montego
Pacific Northworst GP	Silversleeves Racing^{2}	1967 Wolseley Hornet
The Pitt Maneuver	Sesame Street Outlaws	1996 Saturn SL1
Yokohama Lemons Block Party	Ziptied Racing	1968 Doge Dart-Daytona
Lemons Hallettosis	We're Just Here for the SR	1999 Chevrolet Blazer
Yokohama Days of Thunderhill	Lost in Translation	1995 Mitsuoka Viewt
The B.F.E. GP	Salty Thunder Racing^{2}	1986 Pontiac 1000
Yokohama Real Hoopties of New Jersey	British Empire Strikes Back	1965 Sunbeam Alpine
The Rust Belt GP	Focus Club	2001 Ford Focus
GP du Lac Chargoggagogg(etc)	Dead Horse Beaters	1967 Ford Mustang coop
Doing Time in Joliet	Bad Decisions Racing^{3}	1995 Pontiac Camero
High Plains Drifter 2023 (Full 24 Hrs)	Soiled Suits Racing	1974 Chevrolet Camaro
The Colonel & The Sinkhole	This Dog Won't Hunt	1982 Toyota Celica Supra
Yokohama Button Turrible	Argonauts Awful Space	1956 Nash Metropolitan
The Sausage Fest	Team Naskarl	1996 Lincoln MarkVIII
Smells Like AMC Spirit	Low Road Racing^{2}	1947 Chevy Stylemaster
Halloween Hooptiefest	Cheesebolt Enterprises^{2}	1987 Ford Tempo
Yokohama Stuntin' & Splodin' Soiree	SIMP Motorsports	1992 Mazda 929
Yokohama Arse-Freeze-Apalooza	Bernal Dads Racing	2001 Dodge Ram Van
The Kim Harmon Scrotium 500	Jeancoln Jown Jar	1995 Lincoln Town Car

=== 2024 ===
Race	Team	Car
Shine Country Classic	Team Blind Squirrels	1993 Ford Escort
Jank of the West 2024 (3-Mile)	Notta Miata	2002 Mini Cooper
Cain't Git Bayou	Schadenfreude Racing	1979 BMW MERCEDES FORD VOLVO NISSAN 320i Diesel swap
The Pitt Maneuver	The Wonderment Consortium^{3}	1996 Volkswagen Passat
Lemons Block Party	GRITS - Garbage Raced In the South	1982 Datsun 200sx
Pacific Northworst GP	Mopar Posers	2002 Dodge Intrepid
Lemons Hallettosis	Shopaholics	2001 Chevy Lumina
The Rust Belt GP	Sparrow Thrust Racing	1963 Studebaker Lark
Targa Florida	WTFlorida Racing/BAR Racing/Team Infinit	1975 Dodge Dart
Days of Thunderhill	Not So Cool Runnings	2000 Toyota Corolla
Real Hoopties of New Jersey	Glue Sticks	2002 Jaguar X-Type
The B.F.E. GP 2024 (Full 24 Hrs)	Arc Blast	1976 Datsun 620
Doing Time in Joliet	Wally's Aged Cheddar Heads	1979 Triumph TR7
GP du Lac Chargoggagogg(etc)	Mr H Motorsports	1990 Volvo 760 gle
The Rust-Oleum Spray & Slay	Team Skid Steer	1981 Mercury Cougar
High Plains Drifter	Hangar 13 Racing	1972 Chevrolet Vega
Smells Like AMC Spirit	Radioactive	1972 Chevrolet Vega
The Colonel & The Sinkhole	Fat Bastard Racing	1982 Chrysler Fifth Avenue
Button Turrible	Barely Breathing Mouse Movers	2003 Hyundai Accent
Halloween Hooptiefest	Valve Tap Racing^{2}	1978 Chrysler Cordoba
Texas Tippin'	Team Sensory Assault^{2}	1974 Mazda REPU
Arse-Freeze-Apalooza	PIT CREW REVENGE RACING BUTTERCUP^{3}	1975 Lincoln Continental
The Kim Harmon Scrotium 500	Start Racing Motorsports	1991 Chevy S10

=== 2025 ===
Race	Team	Car
Shine Country Classic	Reformation Racing	1997 Jeep Grand Cherokee
Sears Pointless	Almost Ready Racing	1982 Ford Escort
Cain't Git Bayou	Big Rock Candy Mountain	2005 Toyota Camry
The Pitt Maneuver	Poor Energy Racing	2003 Toyota Tacoma
Pacific Northworst GP	BSOD Racing	1987 Fiat X1/9
Lemons Block Party	BAR racing	1998 Toyota Corolla
Lemons Hallettosis	Arc Flash	2000 Ford Focus ZX6
The Rust Belt GP	Cross Thread Racing	1990 Volvo 240DL
The 25:01 2025 (Full 25 Hrs)	Fair Disadvantage Racing	1992 Toyota Paseo
Real Hoopties of New Jersey	Bright Ideas Racing	1994 Chevy S10
The B.F.E. GP	NTD Racing	1994 Oldsmobile Cutlass Ciera S
Doing Time in Joliet	Bottom Gear	1973 Austin Marina
GP du Lac Chargoggagogg(etc)	British Empire Strikes Back^{2}	1977 Triumph TR8
Smells Like AMC Spirit	NachoFriend Racing	1985 Toyota Celica GT-S
The Sausage Fest	Rambles and Co.	1961 Rambler Classic
High Plains Drifter 2025 (Full 24 Hrs)	Zitronenkopf Dummköpfe	1995 Geo Metro
The Colonel & The Sinkhole	Swim Mom Racing Team	1999 Mercedes E320 Wagon
Button Turrible	Het Loopt In De Soep	1969 Daf 55
Halloween Hooptiefest	Teamfubar	1968 MG MGB-GT
Capitol Offense	Borsche AG	1991 Nissan Sentra
Texas Tippin'	Team Lowball^{5}	AMC AMC 4
The Kim Harmon Scrotium 500	Move over motorsports	1996 Mercedes E300
Arse-Freeze-Apalooza	Fanchero	1962 Ford Ranchero

=== 2026 ===
Race	Team	Car
Shine Country Classic	Battle Cat Racing...You Don't Know DITKA	1995 Jaguar Xjr
Cain't Git Bayou	RUDOLF'S REVENGE	2006 Vw Jetta
Sears Pointless	Enjoy Your Diarrhea	1980 Chevy Caprice Wagon
Mid-West Crisis	Peacockified Racing	2004 Hyundai Elantra
Pacific Northworst GP	Dirty Deeds Racing	1978 Datsun PL620
Lemons Block Party	Turtle Racing Team	1994 Toyota Tercel
Lemons Hallettosis	Plump Friction	1968 Mercedes 250
The Sausage Fest	Cornfield Crusaders	1963 Studebaker
The 25:01 2026 (Full 25 Hrs)	Mow Money Mow Problems	1992 Ford Festiva
Real Hoopties of New Jersey	Sesame Street Outlaws^{2}	1951 Studebaker
The B.F.E. GP	We're Just Here for the SR^{2}	1999 Chevy Blazer
Gathering of the Lemon-O's	Grandma's Ride Race Team	2000 Mercury Grand Marquee
Doing Time in Joliet	Occupy Saturn	1994 Saturn SL
GP du Lac Chargoggagogg(etc)	NISMorons	1990 Infiniti M30
Smells Like AMC Spirit	It Will Always Be Denali To Me	2006 Chysler 300c
The Rust Belt GP	Team Hillbilly Deluxe	2003 Cadillac CTS
High Plains Drifter 2026 (Full 24 Hrs)	Midlife Midfield Ninja Turtles	2003 Chevy Cavalier
The Colonel & The Sinkhole	The Shockers	2007 Saturn Ion
Button Turrible	Richie Bobby Racing Talledega Days	1991 Chevy S10

=== Overall wins by vehicle make ===
Make	Wins
Chevrolet	35
Ford	29
Toyota	21
Volkswagen	14
AMC	13
Plymouth	13
Dodge	12
Pontiac	12
Mercedes-Benz	11
Chrysler	9
Datsun	9
Volvo	9
Oldsmobile	8
Buick	7
Geo	7
Austin	6
Cadillac	6
Mercury	6
Studebaker	6
BMW	5
Jaguar	5
MG	5
Triumph	5
Alfa Romeo	4
Fiat	4
Honda	4
Hyundai	4
Lincoln	4
Mazda	4
Saturn	4
Jeep	3
Opel	3
Peugeot	3
Renault	3
Sunbeam	3
Citroën	2
Hudson	2
Humber	2
Lancia	2
Porsche	2
Rover	2
Saab	2
Suzuki	2
Borgward	1
Bricklin	1
Cessna	1
Checker	1
Dacia	1
DAF	1
Eagle	1
Edsel	1
Imperial	1
Infiniti	1
Isuzu	1
Jet Electric Motor Company	1
Lada	1
Lotus	1
Mini	1
Mitsubishi	1
Mitsuoka	1
Nash	1
Nissan	1
Rolls-Royce	1
Sterling	1
Wartburg	1
Willys	1
Wolseley	1
Yugo	1
Other / custom or unidentified	5

== See also ==
- List of motor vehicle awards
