= IOE =

IOE or IoE may refer to:

== Education ==
- Institute of Education (Dublin)
- Institute of Engineering, Kathmandu, Nepal
- Institutes of Eminence is a scheme of excellence for higher education institutes in India
- UCL Institute of Education, University College London

== Other uses ==
- IOE engine, a type of internal combustion engine
- Images of England, an online photographic record of all the listed buildings in England
- Index of Effluency, the top prize of the 24 Hours of Lemons
- International Organisation of Employers
- Internet of everything
- Industrial and operations engineering, a specialization of industrial engineering
