= Speedycop (racing team) =

Speedycop & The Gang of Outlaws is an American endurance racing team that competes in the 24 Hours of Lemons. The team is led by Jeff Bloch, a retired Washington D.C. police officer, and is known for its unconventional race car builds. The team has received significant media coverage for its unique vehicles, which include a road-racing airplane, an upside-down car, and an amphibious helicopter.

== History ==
The team was founded by Jeff Bloch, a retired United States Park Police sergeant who served in Washington D.C. before retiring in 2023. Known by the nickname "Speedycop," Bloch and his team, "The Gang of Outlaws," have built numerous cars for the 24 Hours of Lemons series.

== Notable cars ==
Speedycop & The Gang of Outlaws are best known for their unconventional race cars. These builds have won the top prize in the 24 Hours of Lemons, the Index of Effluency, which is awarded to the team whose car performs the best relative to how poor or unlikely a racer it is.

=== The Spirit of LeMons ===
In 2013, the team debuted The Spirit of LeMons, a race car built from the fuselage of a 1956 Cessna 310 airplane. The fuselage was mounted on the chassis of a Toyota Van. The car competed in the March 2013 "Southern Discomfort" race at Carolina Motorsports Park, where it finished 65th out of 84 entries and won the Index of Effluency award.

=== The Upside-Down Camaro ===
Later in 2013, the team created the Upside-Down Camaro, a car that appears to be racing on its roof. The vehicle was constructed from a 1999 Chevrolet Camaro body mounted upside-down on the chassis of a 1990 Ford Festiva. The car debuted at the August 2013 race at New Jersey Motorsports Park.

=== The Trippy Tippy Hippy Van ===
In 2017, the team raced the Trippy Tippy Hippy Van, a 1976 Volkswagen Microbus body mounted on its side on the chassis of a 1988 Volkswagen Rabbit. The van finished 46th out of 63 entries and won the Index of Effluency at NCM Motorsports Park in Kentucky in July 2017.

=== The SpeedyCopter ===
Another notable build was the SpeedyCopter, an amphibious road-racing helicopter. The vehicle was built from the body of a 1969 Bell OH-58 Kiowa helicopter mounted on a Toyota van chassis. The SpeedyCopter competed at the May 2016 race at New Jersey Motorsports Park, where it won the Organizer's Choice award.

== Awards and recognition ==
- Index of Effluency
  - March 2013, Carolina Motorsports Park (The Spirit of LeMons)
  - July 2017, NCM Motorsports Park (The Trippy Tippy Hippy Van)
- Organizer's Choice
  - May 2016, New Jersey Motorsports Park (The SpeedyCopter)
