= Ford Thunderbird (fourth generation) =

Ford Thunderbird Fourth Generation
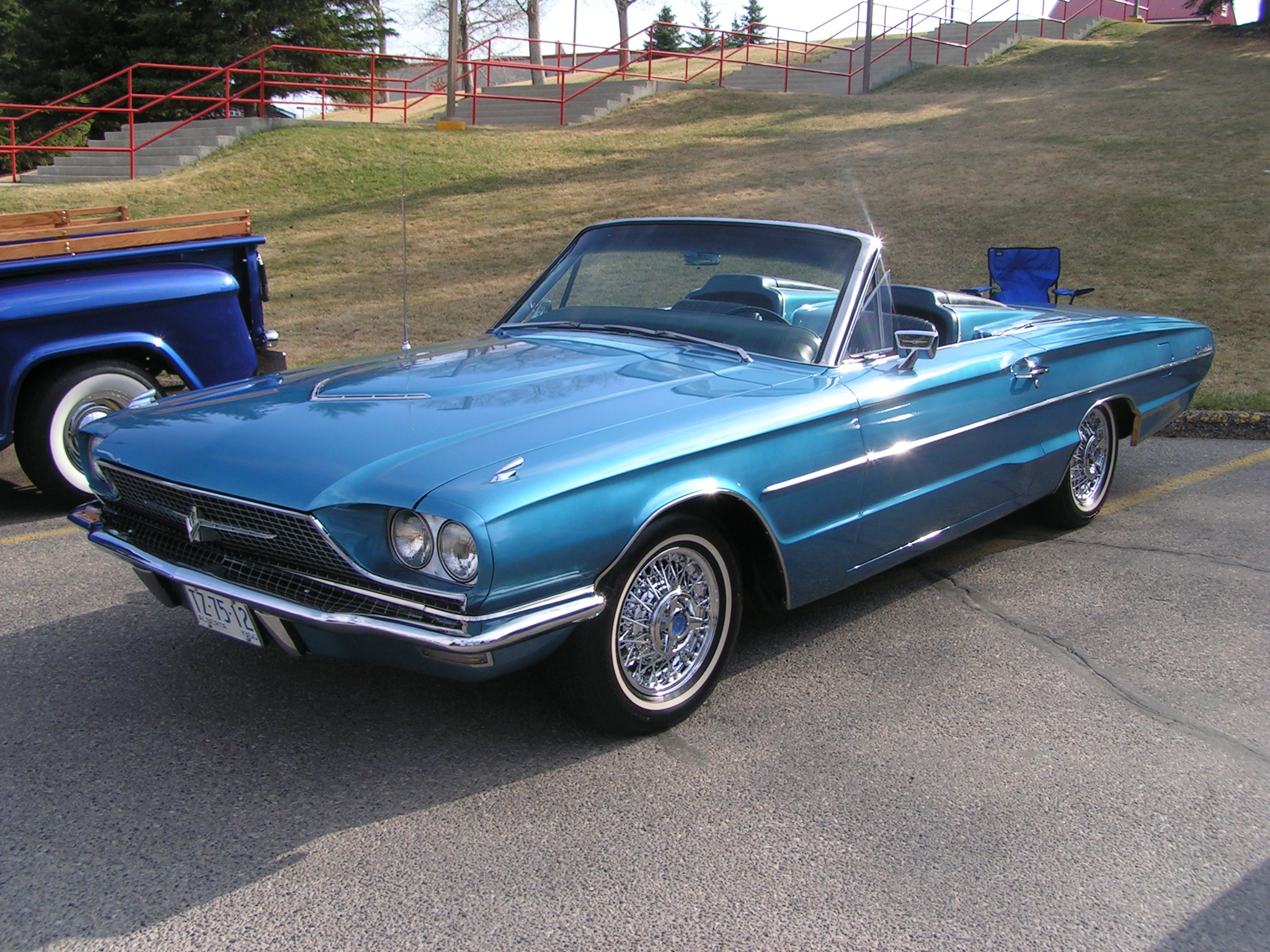
- 1966 Thunderbird Convertible

Overview
- Manufacturer: Ford Motor Company
- Production: 1964–1966
- Assembly: United States: Wixom Assembly Plant, Wixom, Michigan

Body and chassis
- Class: Personal luxury car
- Body style: 2-door hardtop coupe; 2-door landau; 2-door convertible
- Layout: Front-engine, rear-wheel-drive
- Chassis: unibody

Powertrain
- Engine: 390 cu in (6.4 L) FE V8; 427 cu in (7.0 L) FE V8 (Not a factory option, but a dealer installed option.); 428 cu in (7.0 L) FE V8
- Transmission: 3-speed Cruise-O Matic MX automatic; 3-speed Ford C6 automatic

Chronology
- Predecessor: Ford Thunderbird (third generation)
- Successor: Ford Thunderbird (fifth generation)

The fourth generation Ford Thunderbird is a large personal luxury car produced by Ford for the 1964 to 1966 model years. Ford restyled this generation of the Thunderbird in favor of a more squared-off, "formal" look. The only remnant of the Thunderbird's former sporty image was that the standard 390-cubic-inch 300 hp (224 kW) V8 engine needed nearly 11 seconds to push the heavy T-bird to 60 mph (97 km/h). The softly sprung suspension allowed considerable body lean, wallow, and float on curves and bumps. Contemporary testers felt that the Buick Riviera, Pontiac Grand Prix, and Chrysler 300K were substantially more roadworthy cars, but the Thunderbird retained its leading market share.

== Models ==
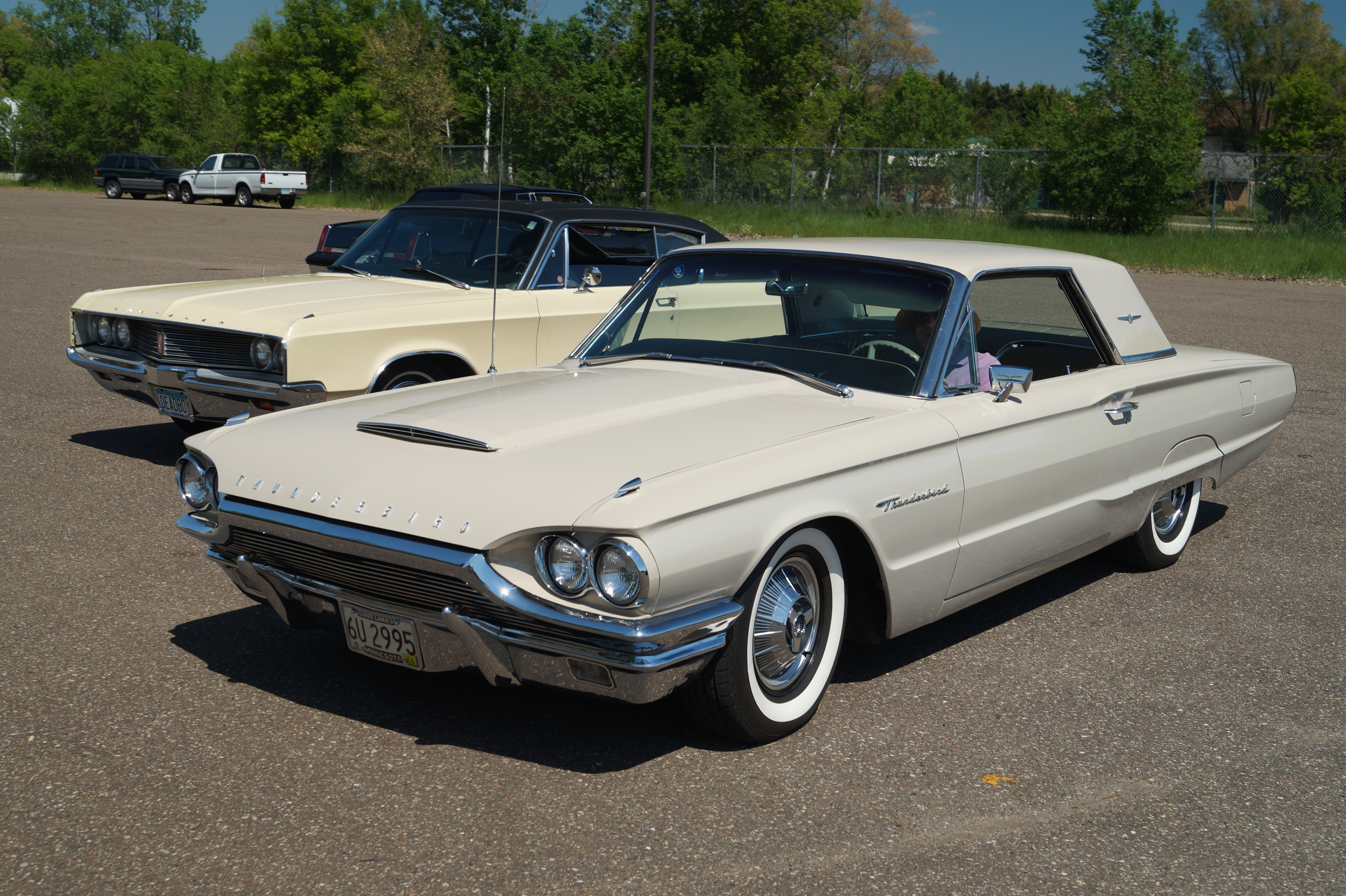
1964 Thunderbird Hardtop Coupe

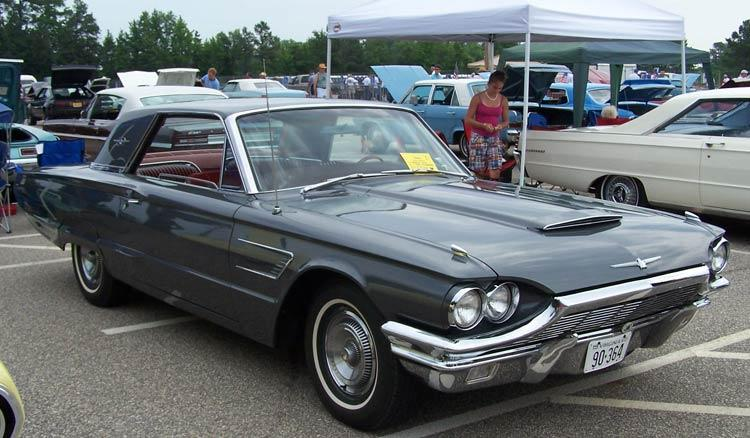
1965 Thunderbird Hardtop

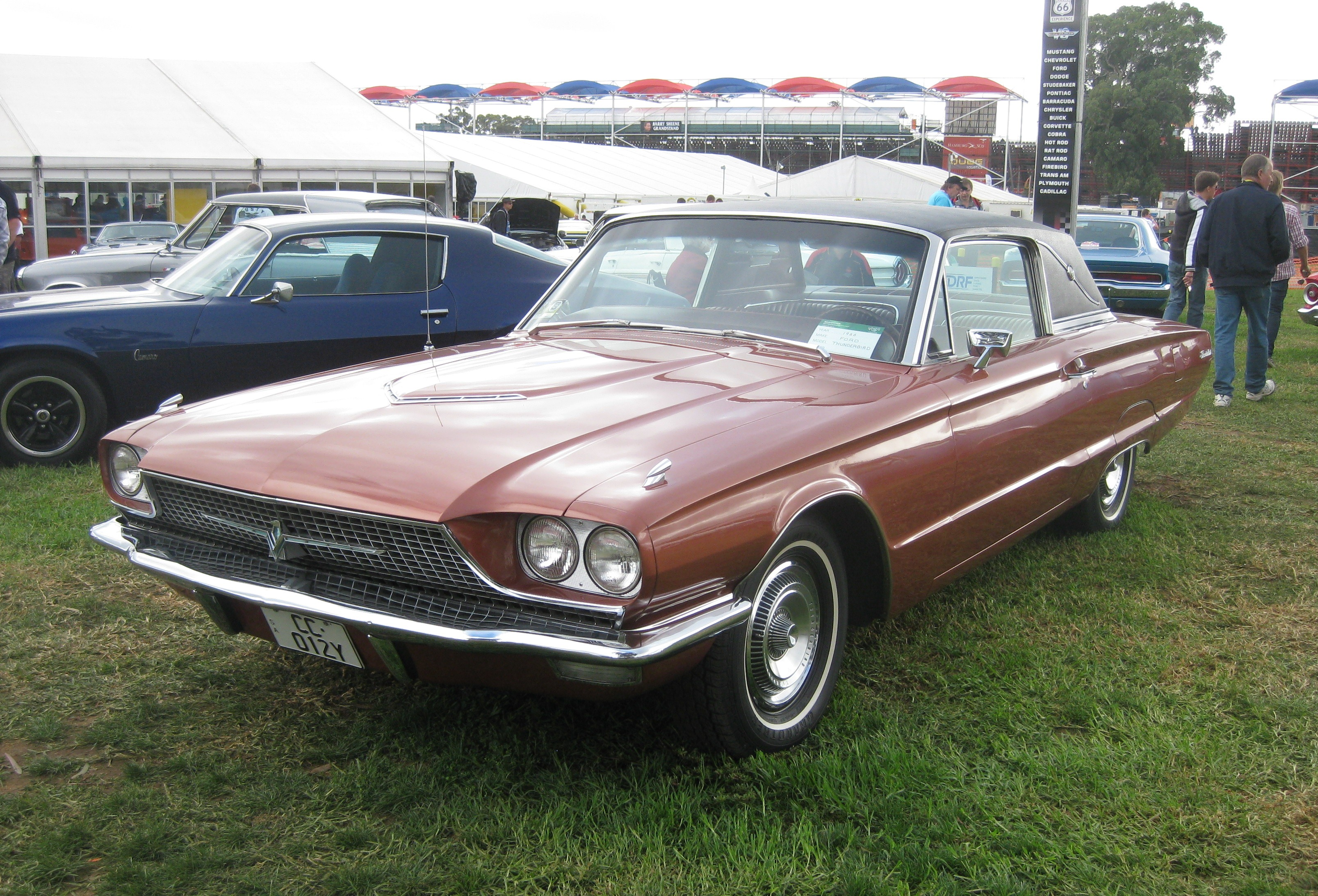
1966 Thunderbird Town Landau

The revised model was initially offered as a hardtop, convertible, and Landau, with vinyl roof, simulated landau irons, and wood grain interior appointments. The Sports Roadster was discontinued for this generation, however, a dealer offered convertible tonneau cover and wire wheels option was still available. Total 1964 sales were excellent at 92,465 units, up nearly fifty percent from the previous year. Still, the popularity of the tonneau cover and wire wheel options continued to decline, with very few being sold. The 1964 Thunderbird was the only model of this generation to have the word 'Thunderbird' spelled out on the front hood instead of a chrome Thunderbird emblem. The only transmission available was the Cruise-O-Matic MX 3 speed automatic. The listed retail price for the 1964 two-door hardtop coupe was US$4,486 ($46,569 in 2025 dollars),

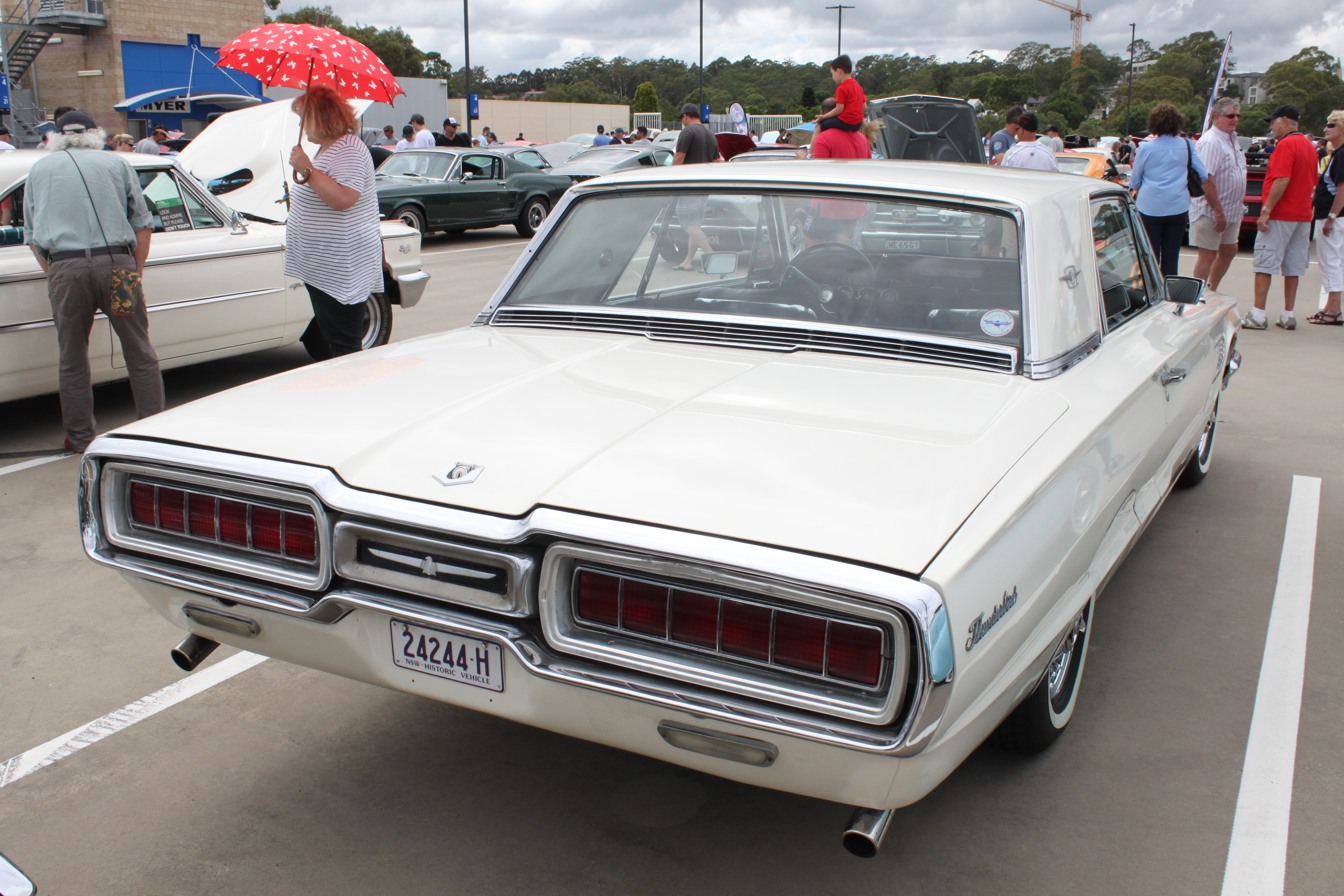
1965 model year saw the debut of sequential turn signals

Several features intended for the new generation were delayed until 1965, when front disc brakes became standard equipment and sequential turn signals which flashed three bulbs in the broad, horizontal tail lights from inside to outside were added; the latter had been delayed by vehicle lighting regulations in the United States. Exterior trim was revised, including a new grille, Thunderbird emblem replacing the block letters on the front edge of the hood, simulated front fender vent trim, revised Thunderbird scripts now located on the rear edge of the quarter panels, and revised taillight lens trim and a single center emblem replacing the dual lens birds and block letters respectively. The popular "Tilt-Away" steering column continued, and was a Thunderbird recognized feature that was later shared on other upper-level Ford Products. Sales, impacted by increasing competition, including cannibalism by Ford's own newly introduced, and more affordable Mustang, dipped to 74,972. Again, the Cruise-O-Matic MX automatic was the only transmission available.

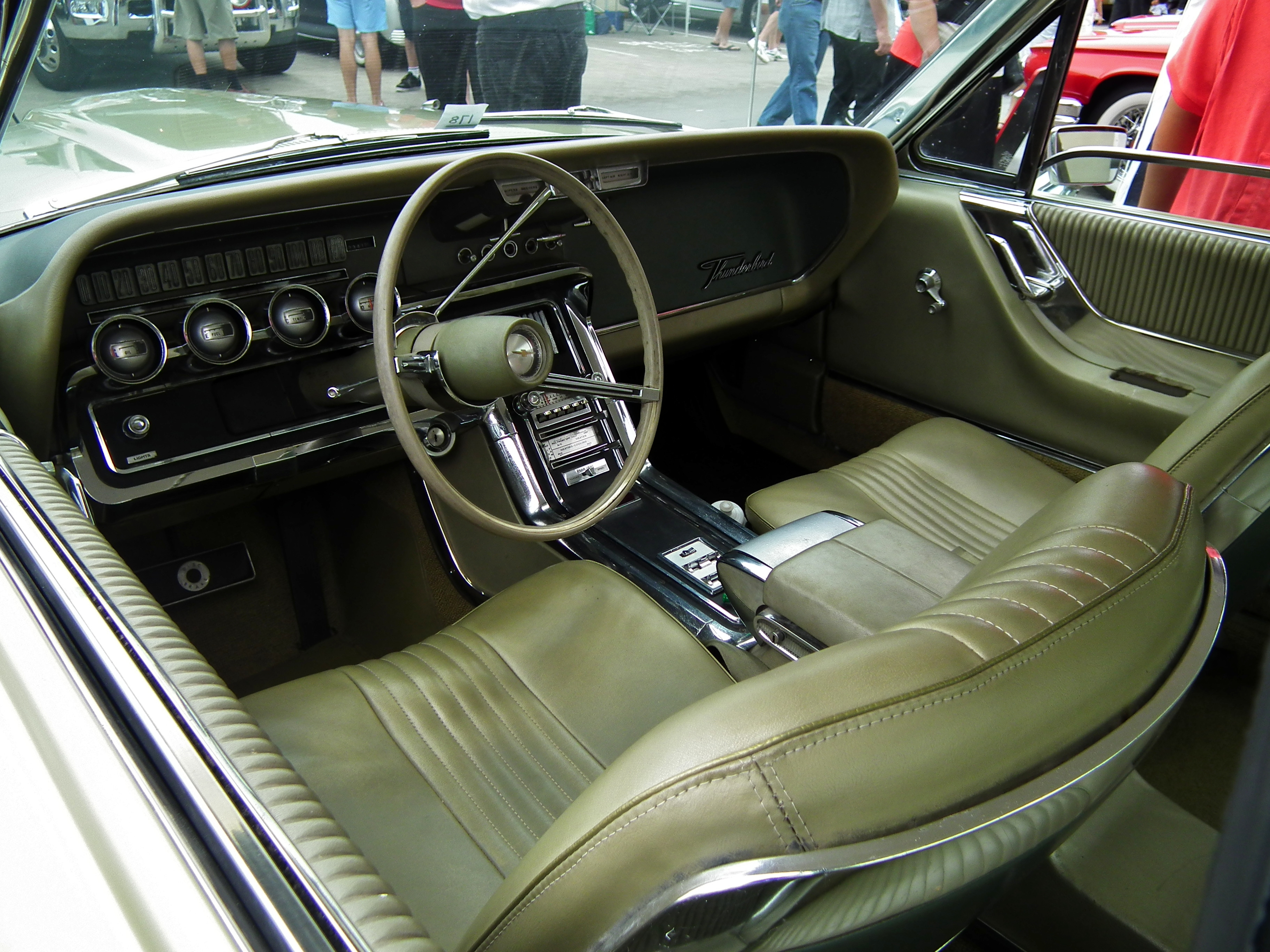
1965 Thunderbird interior

Convertibles borrowed the opening mechanism from the all-new Lincoln Continental where the trunklid would open electrically in a single piece, hinged at the back of the vehicle, then the fabric top would fold down and disappear beneath the trunklid. The mechanism was originally used on the Ford Fairlane 500 Skyliner hardtop convertible of the late 1950s. Opening the trunk on convertibles for storage required that the lid be opened electrically, without deploying or retracting the folding convertible top.

For 1966, the 390-cubic-inch V8's power was increased to 315 hp (235 kW). The larger 428-cubic-inch (7.0 L) V-8 became optional, rated at 345 hp (257 kW) and providing a notable improvement in 0-60 mph acceleration to about 9 seconds. All models featured a new front clip. A flatter hood, re-shaped front fenders, new headlight buckets, new egg-crate grille with large Thunderbird emblem, new bumper guards, a single bumper bar, and painted roll pan replaced the previous two model year's two-piece front bumper. The rear taillights were revised, now a 3-piece unit going the full width across the rear, the backup light now located in the center section replaced the formerly rear roll pan-mounted lamps.

A new Town Sedan model was offered, which featured a roof with blind quarter panels for a more 'formal' look, at the cost of rear visibility, and removed the retractable side window for rear passengers which were offered only on the Hardtop Coupe and Convertible. The Landau trim package added to the Town Sedan a padded roof and landau S-bars. It became by far the best-selling model, accounting for 35,105 units of the 1966 model year's 69,176 units sold. The transmission used on early build 390 V8-equipped T-Birds was the Cruise-O-Matic MX; however, late-build 390 and all 428 V8-equipped T-Birds had the new C6 3-speed automatic installed.

== Films and popular culture ==
A black 1964 Thunderbird convertible had a notable role in the TV series Highlander: The Series as protagonist Duncan Macleod’s main mode of transportation. A white 1964 Thunderbird convertible was used by Felix Leiter in a chase scene in the 1964 James Bond film Goldfinger, starring Sean Connery. Another appears briefly in the 1965 James Bond film Thunderball. A Convertible 1964 Thunderbird appears in the Twilight Zone episode, "Come Wander With Me", starring Gary Crosby.

In 1965, an Episode of the TV Show "Hazel" (S4, E16) had 2 similar-looking Thunderbirds, a 1964 and a 1965, which caused some confusion during the show. In reality, the 1964 and 1965 Thunderbirds were distinctive enough to not allow confusion, but the 1965 was the first Year of the 2-sided Key, which was completely different from the 1964.

A gold 1966 Town Landau was driven by Dean Martin as Matt Helm in the 1966 film Murderers' Row. It featured several gadgets including the ability to display a scrolling message which ran across the tail-lights. The driver could dictate what they wanted to appear there into a microphone. A green 1966 Thunderbird convertible was prominently featured in the 1991 road film Thelma and Louise, starring Susan Sarandon and Geena Davis, a red 1966 Thunderbird convertible was featured in the 1983 film The Outsiders which was directed by Francis Ford Coppola, and a black 1965 Thunderbird Convertible was featured in the David Lynch film Wild at Heart, starring Nicolas Cage and Laura Dern. A black 1965 Thunderbird Landau was featured at the start of the Nintendo Power video N64: Change the System. It was shown transporting the three gamers to Nintendo of America headquarters for a first-hand sneak preview of Nintendo 64.

== Production totals ==
Year	Production
1964	92,465
1965	74,972
1966	69,176
Total	236,613
