= 24 Hours of Lemons =

Series of endurance car races

- Category: Endurance racing
- Country: United States
- Inaugural season: 2006
- Drivers: Amateur racers
- Official website: 24hoursoflemons.com

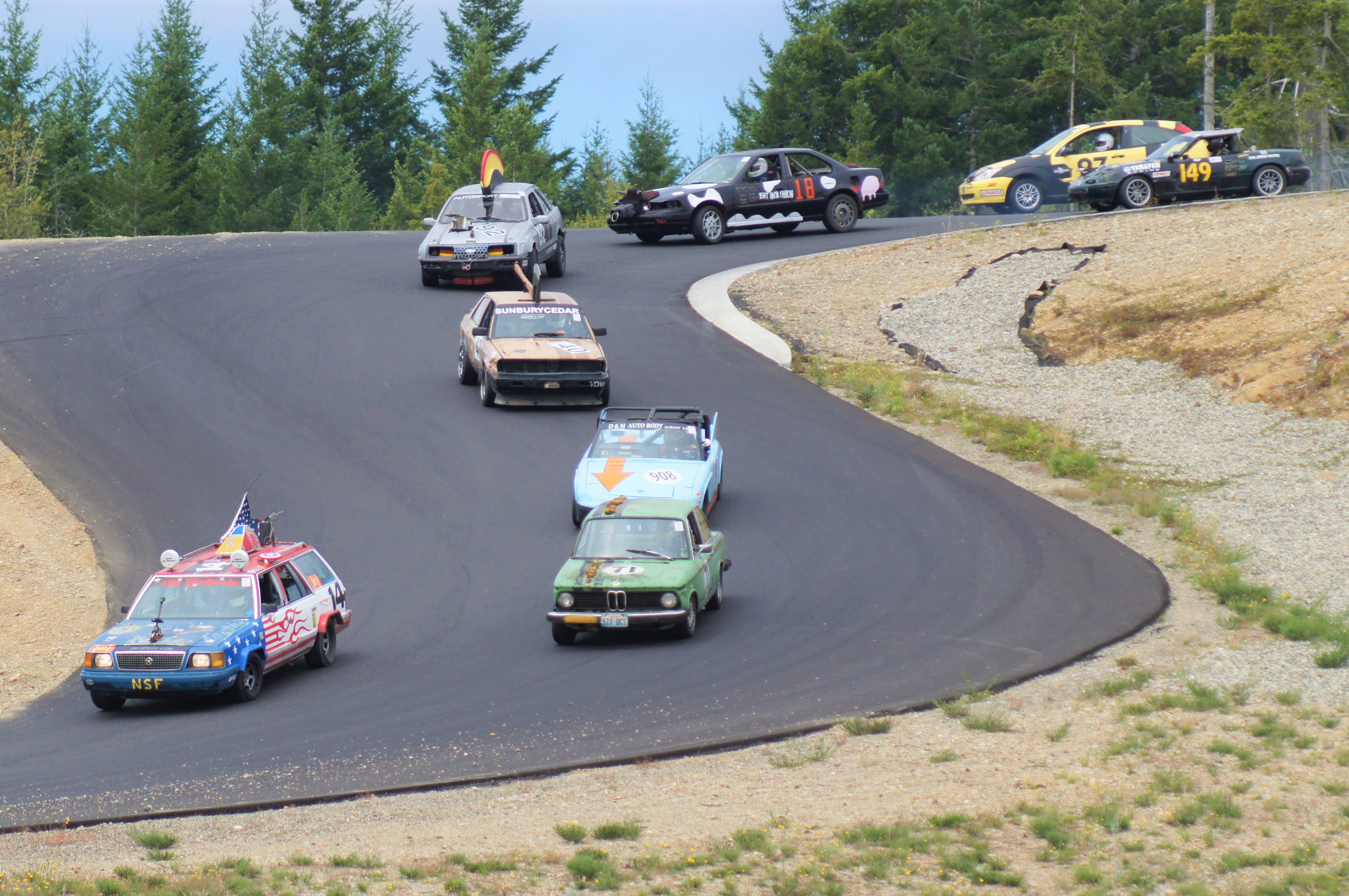
24 Hours of Lemons race at Ridge Motorsports Park

The 24 Hours of Lemons, sometimes styled as "24 Hours of LeMons", "24 Hours of LeMONS", or "24 Hours of LEMONS", is a series of endurance races held on paved road race courses across the United States.

The series holds a Guinness World Record for the "Most participants in one race" (216 cars) set at Thunderhill Raceway Park in September 2014, even though the proper FIA sanctioned Nürburgring 24 Hours races of the 2000s had more than 220 cars entered. This is possible because the Nordschleife track is about four times longer than most others.

The name of the race series is a play on words alluding to both the long-running annual 24 Hours of Le Mans sports car race in Le Mans, France, and the notion of "lemon" cars. The event is similar to the folkracing phenomenon in Nordic countries, and similar to the ChampCar Endurance Series, which developed out of the 24 Hours of Lemons, but has a more carnival-like atmosphere. Teams of at least two drivers compete for up to 24 hours in race-prepared cars with a price limit of no more than US$500 (not including safety equipment) for cars. These races set themselves apart from the typical road race by their severe price limit imposed on the contestants' vehicles, their unusual penalties and punishments meted out by judges, and their blatant disregard for traditional motorsport politicking.

== Event overview ==
Despite the name of the series, most of the events are a total of 12–16 hours of racing split across two days. Race sessions are usually mid-morning to early evening on both days, except for the occasional 24-hour contest that runs mid-day on Saturday straight through the night to mid-day Sunday.

=== History ===
The 24 Hours of Lemons, founded by author/editor Jay Lamm (self-appointed "Chief Perp") along with co-founders Nick Pon and Jeff Glenn, began in 2006 as a progression of an earlier San Francisco, California, event, the Double 500, which was a 500-kilometer road rally for US$500 vehicles. After several yearly Double 500s, the organizers deemed the event too easy, so the 24 Hours of Lemons endurance race was born.

The earliest Lemons races were held at Altamont Motorsports Park and other tracks in California. The series expanded in 2008 to include events in the eastern United States, with races held in Connecticut, Ohio, South Carolina, Texas, and the races in California and Nevada. Races are now held all over the U.S., and are broken into various U.S. regions: East, Gulf, Midwest, South, and West.

In May 2008, a Lemons race held at Altamont was struck by tragedy when the driver of one of the cars died during the race. Court Summerfield, 47, suffered a heart attack or stroke during the race and crashed into a wall. Investigations concluded that there were no related mechanical problems with the car and that the driver was already dead upon impact.

In 2016, license agreements were reached to expand Lemons racing into Australia and New Zealand. The Lemons franchise agreement with organizers in Australia and New Zealand was discontinued in 2020. It has since been named under the tagline "NaZCAR Lemons and Limes".

== Preparation and rules ==
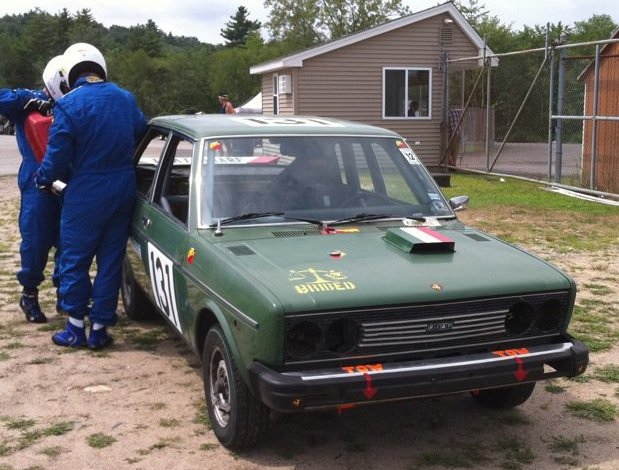
A typical Lemons racer being refueled; in this case, a Fiat 131

To enter the event, participants must find a car where purchasing and prepping the car will not exceed US$500, not including safety equipment.

The name of the race alludes to the relatively low value of entrants' cars, as such vehicles might be considered "lemons". The event organizers set a complete set of safety rules that typically are on par with other road racing sanctioning bodies, including the Sports Car Club of America and National Auto Sport Association. Additions to the rules (both serious and humorous, plus rules to discourage cheating) include:

- Dollar limit to prep car. This includes the car's purchase price, any modifications made to it, and other assorted expenses (such as labor and sponsorships) are figured into the cost. Approved safety equipment (see below) plus brakes, wheels, and tires are not included in the vehicle purchase figure.
- Items sold off a car can be deducted from the total spent, so it is possible to buy a more expensive car and sell off parts, or sell parts and buy better equipment. (e.g., selling off parts from a BMW or other similar luxury car to circumvent/comply with the purchase 'cap' rule.)
  - If the event organizers feel the car has exceeded its financial limit, they assign what is called a BSF (Bullshit Factor), where every $10 the car exceeds over the purchase price is docked one lap (BS penalties may vary in each territory).
- Car must have four wheels and have been legal for highway use at its time of manufacture.

Required safety equipment includes:

- A six-point roll cage
- Full-face Snell SA2015 helmet or better
- Fire extinguisher and fire suppression system
- Five or six-point racing harness
- SFI 3.2A/1 Nomex-style fire suit, fire resistant/retardant gloves, shoes, and fire retardant underwear
- SFI 38.1-rated or FIA 8858-rated head and neck support.
- Driver's seat must reach the middle of the helmet or higher. SFI or FIA approved seat recommended

== Race ==
Most events are 14.5 hours long, with sessions on Saturday and Sunday running from six to ten hours long. There is usually one full 24-hour endurance race each year.

Each race begins with all cars being released onto the track under a full course yellow flag for lap-timing transponder checks. No passing is permitted under yellow, so all cars operational before the start circulate the track in single file for up to 20 minutes until the officials are satisfied that the timing and scoring system is working properly. The race officially begins with the green flag being waved at a randomly chosen car.

Standard racing flags are used by corner workers stationed around the track to communicate with drivers. The black flag is used liberally throughout the race to mandate an immediate pit stop for concerns with driving or with the car. Driving infractions range from contact with another vehicle or fixed barrier and overly aggressive driving to spinning or driving two wheels off the track. Car problems that typically result in black flags are, most frequently, obvious safety problems such as any fluid leak, parts hanging off the car, or inoperative lights. Drivers must report to the penalty box immediately after being shown a black flag.

Races split into two days have a checkered flag at the end of the first day, signifying the end of the racing session. The race is restarted the next day, usually with the top ten cars being permitted to line up in order, with the car in first place getting the green flag.

== Penalties ==
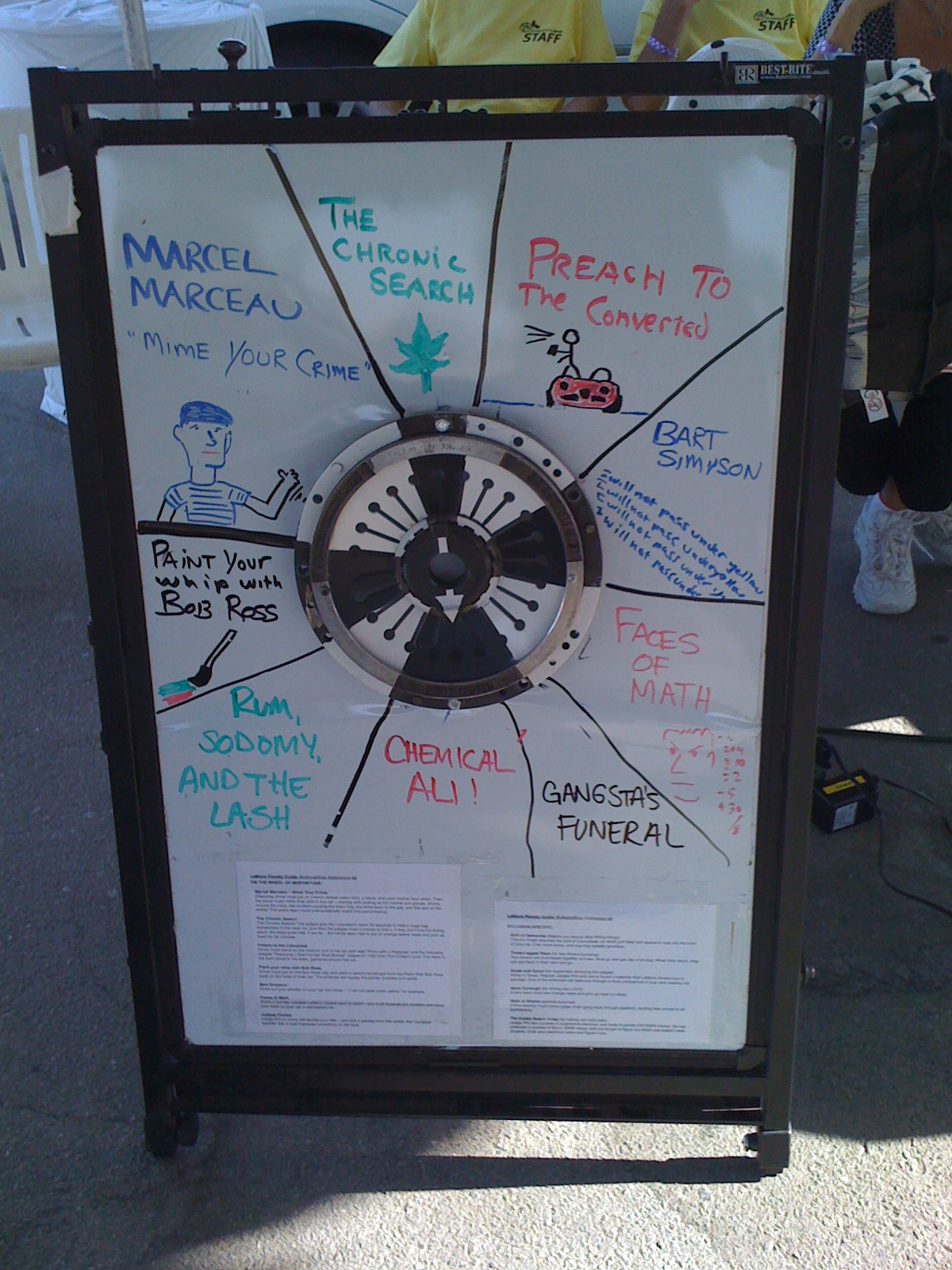
Wheel of Misfortune – Buttonwillow, CA August 15–16, 2009

Lemons officials have an idiosyncratic penalty and punishment system whereby penalties for some infractions are meted out by a device called the "Wheel of Misfortune". Various devices may be put onto the car in order to affect car performance; one device used is metal silhouettes of various farm animals welded to the roof by the "Arc Angel" to reduce aerodynamic efficiency. Any car that flips in the process of the race is slapped with the "Why Am I Upside-Down?" penalty: the team is disqualified for the current race, and the driver is barred from all other races for one year. Drivers and teams can have to undertake physical acts to satisfy punishment conditions, such as the Marcel Marceau Memorial "Mime Your Crime" penalty, where a driver must put on white face paint and a beret and mime what they did wrong. Penalties are often tailored to address current events or figures where the race is run. Examples of this include the "Max Mosley S&M Penalty", the "Sheriff Joe Arpaio Penalty" in Arizona (where drivers must don pink underwear, sit in a hot tent, and eat stale bologna sandwiches, all punishments the Maricopa County sheriff has inflicted at his prisons), and the "Mark Sanford 'Cry For Me, Argentina' Memorial Penalty" at a race in South Carolina, in which a driver must write a lengthy love letter to their Argentine mistress on their car, à la the former governor of that state. All penalties are designed to waste a transgressing driver's time.

== Concours ==
Coinciding with the race is the Concours De Lemons (a parody of the revered Concours d'Elegance car shows). The show's working title was the Concours D'Ignorance.

== Awards ==
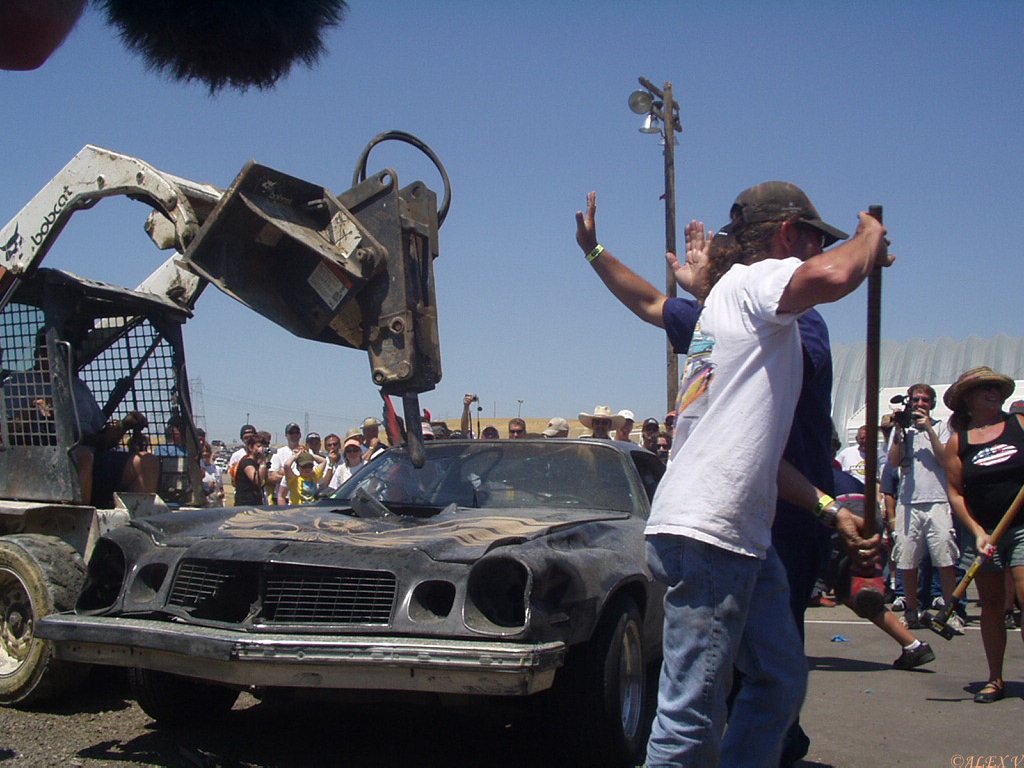
Car being destroyed at Altamont, July 2007

There are a variety of awards and trophies given at the conclusion of each race. Prize money has, in the past, been awarded in a number of humorous manners, including payment in nickels and checks made out on toilet seats.

The midway award was aptly named the "People's Curse". One car was voted People's Curse for being driven by the biggest jerks of the day, as judged by the attending crowd. The offending car was crushed or otherwise destroyed, typically by heavy equipment. However, an angry mob with wire cutters and wrenches had been used when none could be found. If there were not enough votes to destroy a car, it might have instead received nasty but non-fatal damage, or it may have been sent to the "penalty box" with a black flag. The practice of crushing cars was later discontinued for safety reasons.

The counterpoint to the People's Curse, "Organizers Choice" (initially "People's Choice"), is awarded to the team that best represents the friendly spirit of the race.

The car that completes the most laps, net of pre-race "BS" penalties, is awarded the "Win on Laps", and the team receives a trophy.

The grand prize (and considered by some to be the "true" winner) is the "Index of Effluency" award, presented to a car considered unlikely to finish the race at all, let alone finish with a respectable number of laps completed. The team that wins the Index of Effluency is given a trophy, a cash prize, and free entry in a future race.

Before a race, every entry is assigned into a class, A, B, or C. The car in each class that completes the most laps, net of pre-race "BS" penalties (except the winner on laps, which was previously recognized), is awarded the class win, and the team receives a trophy.

Several other trophies are given: "Heroic Fix", "I Got Screwed", and "Judge's Choice", along with a region-specific trophy that celebrates a particular timely or localized cultural reference or idiosyncrasy of a team from the region. This has included awards for "Dangerous Homemade Technology".

The organizers announce annual team and driver champions (based on points accrued from overall race finishing positions) at the end of each season.
