= Sterling (marque) =

Brand name of automobile marketed in the United States by ARCONA

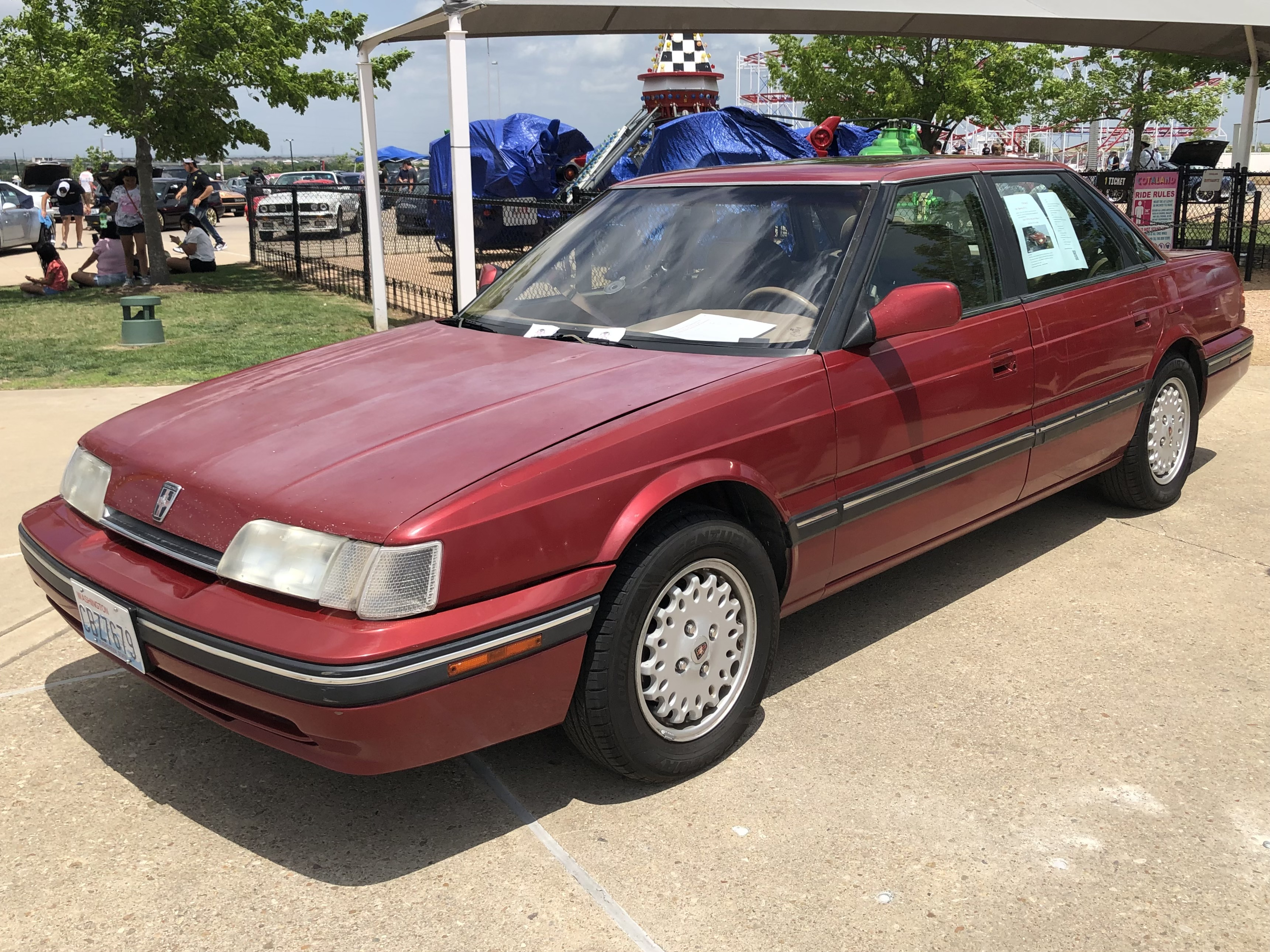
1991 Sterling 827 SL saloon

Sterling was a brand name of automobiles marketed in the United States and Canada by Austin Rover Cars of North America (later renamed Sterling Motor Cars), a division of the Rover Group company of the United Kingdom. It was sold in North America from 1987 to 1991, during which time Rover was in collaboration with Honda of Japan. Models sold were the Sterling 825, Sterling 827 and a limited production Sterling Oxford Edition based on the 827.

== Model range ==
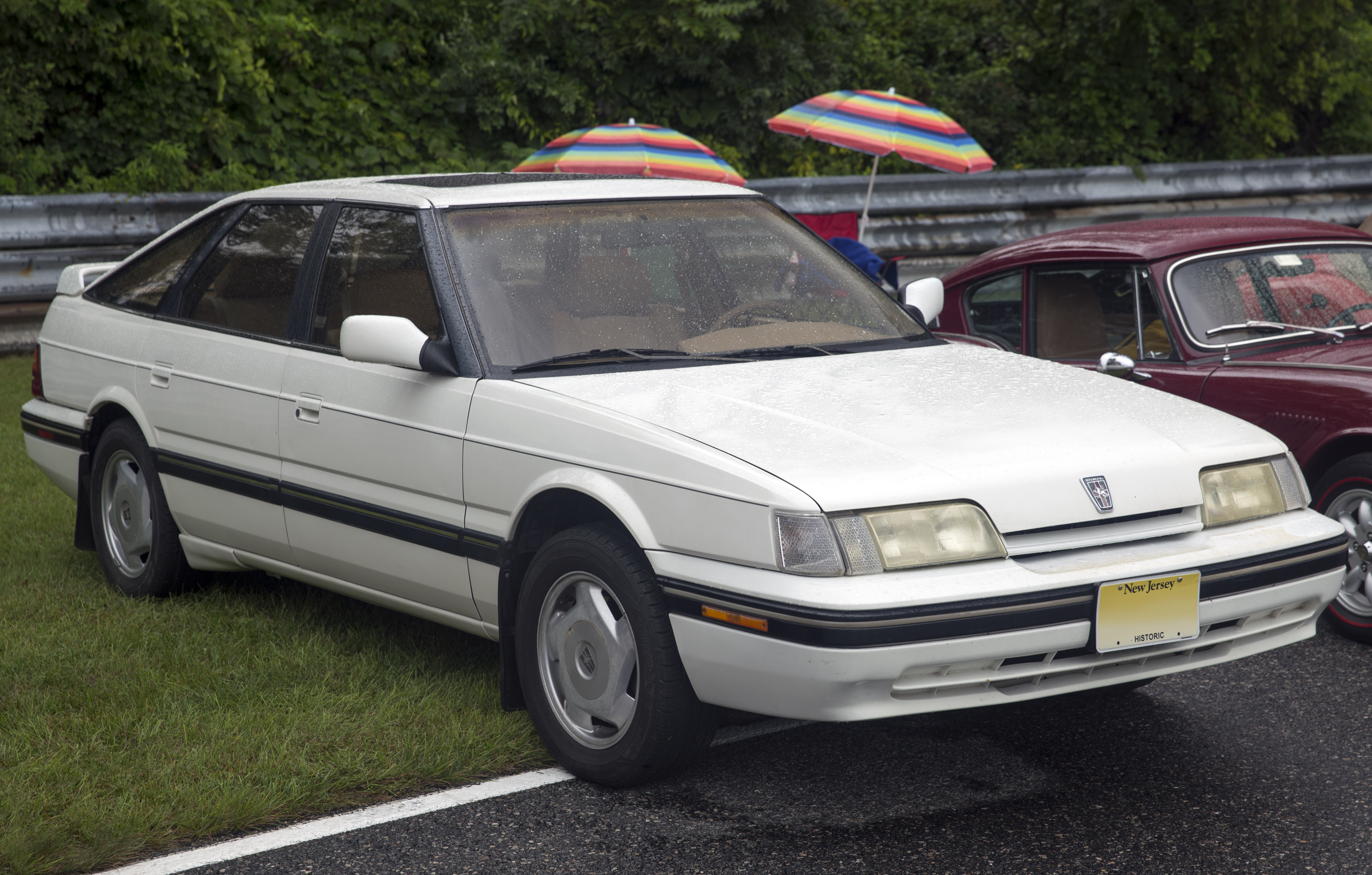
1989 Sterling 827 SLi hatchback

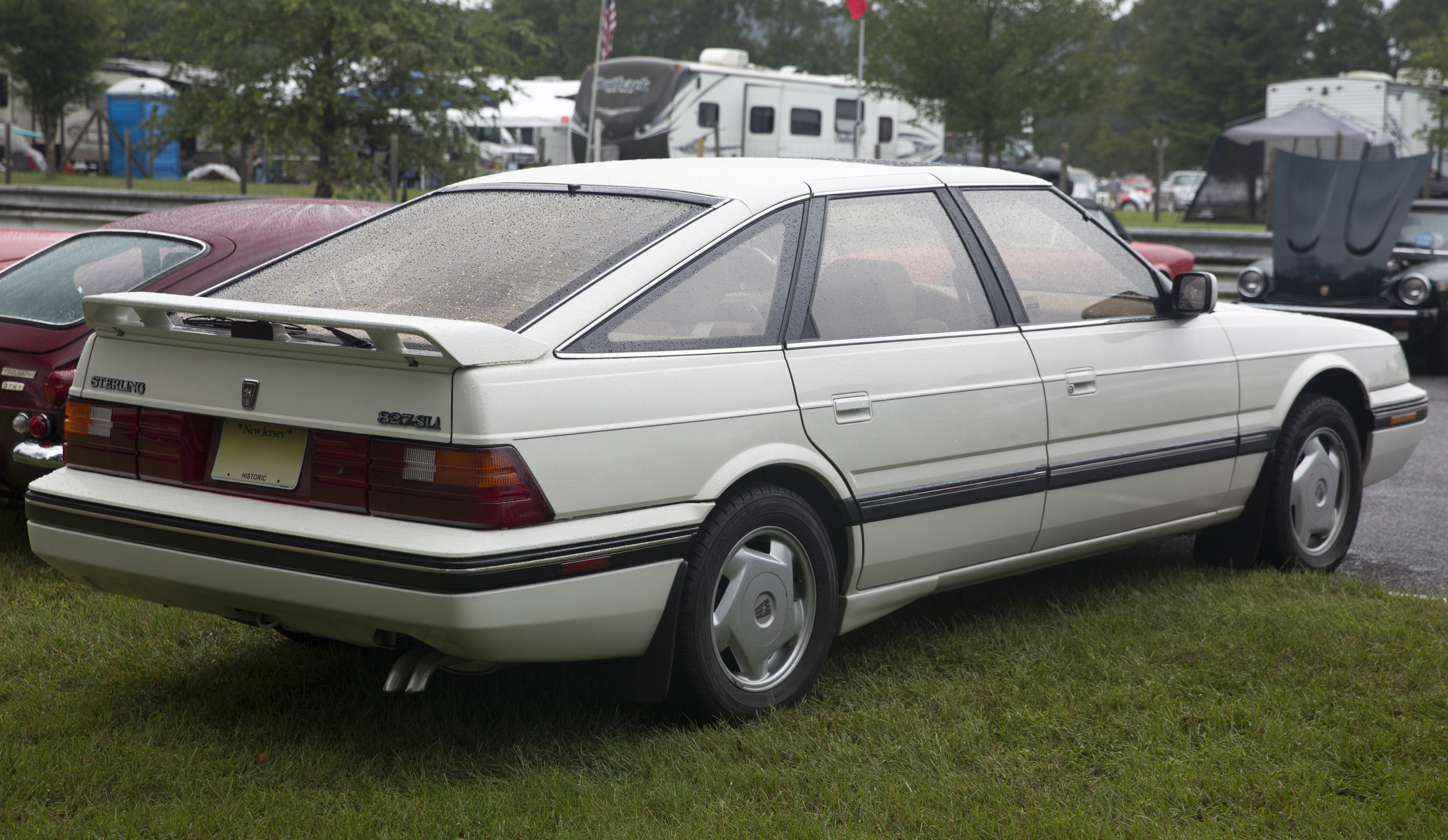
1989 Sterling 827 SLi hatchback (rear view)

The only Sterling model that was sold was the 800 series, which was a rebadged Rover 800 series but with different specifications tailored for the North American market. In the United States and Canada, the Sterling was only available with a V6 gasoline engine.

=== 825 and 827 ===
In 1987 and 1988, only the sedan body-styled 825 (trims S or SL) was offered. In 1989, the hatchback was added alongside the saloon, coinciding with the introduction of a new, larger, Honda engine.

The new models were called 827 and were available in S, SL, SL Limited or SLi trims in 1989; S, Si, SL or SLi trims in 1990; and Si or SLi trims in 1991.

=== Oxford Edition ===
350 limited production Oxford Editions were also available in 1990. Based on the Sterling 827 SL sedan, the Oxford Edition included upgraded interior trim and added various luxury/convenience items such as a built-in cellular phone.

== Experience in the market ==
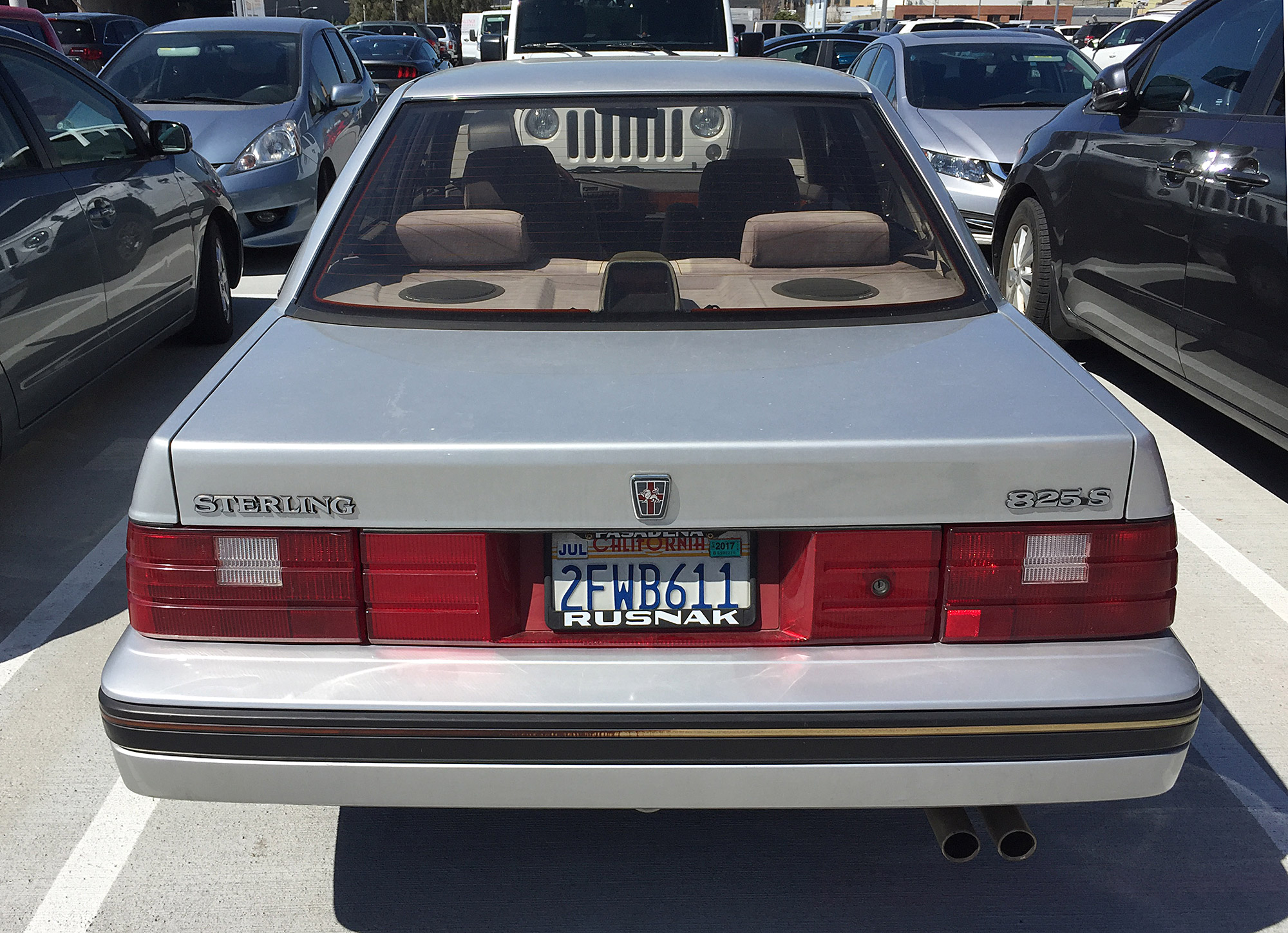
Sterling 825S

The Sterling's 'British' interior design, combined with a clean and up to date exterior design, compared well with its sister the Acura Legend. U.S. sales hit a high of just over 14,000 cars in 1987. All models came with real wood interior trim. The SL models also feature ABS, power Connolly leather seats, and two-tone paint as standard equipment. U.S. market Sterlings received motorized automatic seatbelts in the 1989 model year.

While dynamic characteristics and performance were broadly similar to the Legend, due to the shared platform, core structure and power units; detail spring and damper changes gave each model a unique feel. The Sterlings were sportier, with less float and tighter feel than the Acura Legends. The ride/handling compromise was defined through the shared use of Honda's double wishbone front suspension that allowed a very low hood line, but offered limited wheel travel. This meant that on poorer road surfaces, there was a greater possibility of reduced traction.

Early build quality of the 800 was demonstrably poor as measured by J.D. Power. The various problems included issues with interior trim – for example, the hood latch remained on the passenger side of the cabin the first year in production – problematic Lucas electronics, and paintwork. Corrosion problems in early models would also mar its reputation. All of this contributed to the eventual demise of Rover in the United States. The Sterling fell to the bottom of J.D. Power surveys, while its twin, the Japanese-built Acura Legend, had enjoyed top rankings its first year.

During production, the instrumentation had been changed to gauges sourced from a different component builder (losing the oil pressure gauge and voltmeter in the process) and build quality improved year to year.

== Discontinuation ==
Combined with the effects of the strong British currency, Rover was losing money, and recovering lost ground with the facelifted car and its coupe sister was not deemed possible, and Rover Cars announced its withdrawal from the North American market in August 1991. At the time of the announcement, the company had sold fewer than 2,000 units so far that year.

After the withdrawal from the U.S. market, the Rover 800 remained popular in Europe, especially following the major R17 facelift and was kept in production until 1999 when it was replaced by the Rover 75.

== Sales ==
| Calendar Year | U.S. Sales |
|---|---|
| 1987 | 14,171 |
| 1988 | 8,901 |
| 1989 | 5,907 |
| 1990 | 4,015 |
| 1991 | 2,745 |

== See also ==
- List of car manufacturers of the United States
- Rover 825 Sterling / Rover 827 Sterling
