= Ford Thunderbird (third generation) =

Ford Thunderbird Third Generation
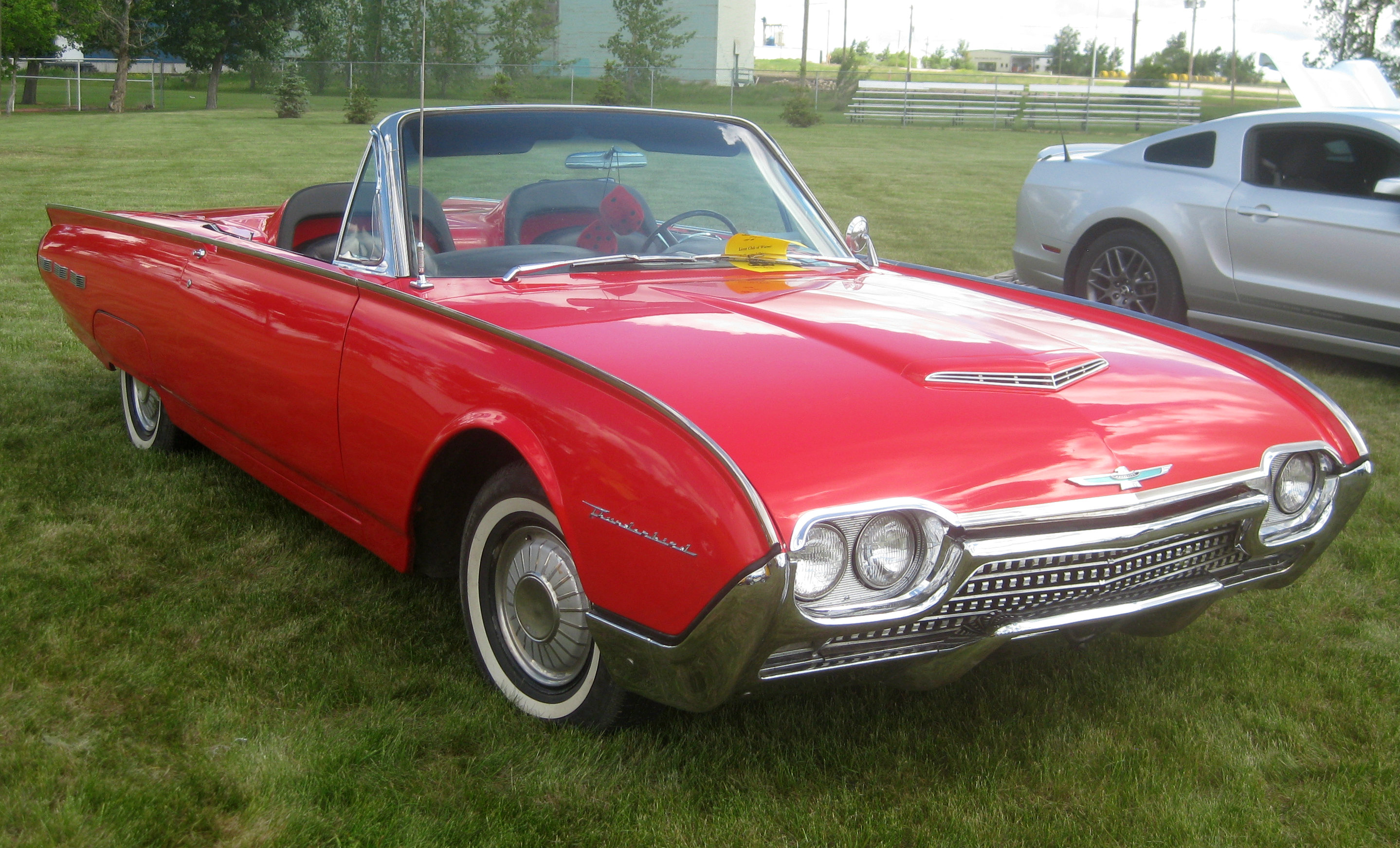
- 1962 Ford Thunderbird

Overview
- Manufacturer: Ford Motor Company
- Production: October 1960– July 1963
- Assembly: United States: Wixom Assembly Plant, Wixom, Michigan
- Designer: Bill Boyer

Body and chassis
- Class: Personal luxury car
- Body style: 2-door hardtop coupe; 2-door convertible
- Layout: Front-engine, rear-wheel-drive
- Chassis: unibody

Powertrain
- Engine: 390 cu in (6.4 L) FE V8; 406 cu in (6.7 L) FE V8; 427 cu in (7.0 L) FE V8
- Transmission: 3-speed Cruise-O Matic MX automatic

Dimensions
- Wheelbase: 113.2 in (2,875 mm)
- Length: 205 in (5,207 mm)
- Width: 75.9 in (1,928 mm)

Chronology
- Predecessor: Ford Thunderbird (second generation)
- Successor: Ford Thunderbird (fourth generation)

The third generation of the Ford Thunderbird is a personal luxury car produced by Ford for the 1961 to 1963 model years. It featured new and much sleeker styling (done by Bill Boyer) than the second generation models. Sales were strong, if not quite up to record-breaking 1960, at 73,051 including 10,516 convertibles. A new, larger 390 cu in (6.4 L) FE-series V8 was the only engine available (in 1961). The Thunderbird was 1961's Indianapolis 500 pace car, and featured prominently in US President John F. Kennedy's inaugural parade, probably aided by the appointment of Ford executive Robert McNamara as Secretary of Defense.

== 1961 ==
The Thunderbird for 1961 introduced several firsts for the automotive market. The most distinctive feature of the 1961 to 1963 Thunderbirds was the highly touted 'Swing Away' steering wheel. With the steering-column-installed transmission gear selector in the park position the steering wheel would slide approximately 18 inches (460 mm) to the right allowing the driver to exit the vehicle easily. To prevent accidents, this disabled the gear selector until the steering wheel was returned to the center position. Other innovations include a floating rear view mirror, directly attached to the inside of the windshield. Several standard features, such as power steering and power brakes, back up lights, and bucket seats, were costly options on most other automobiles of the time. Model options included air conditioning, power windows, power seats, AM radio, fender skirts, and white wall tires.

In luxury and performance, the third generation Thunderbird briefly saw competition from the Studebaker Avanti, before its production ended in 1963. The Chrysler 300G was also a powerful personal luxury car rival during 1961.

For 1961 the listed retail price, before optional equipment, was US$4,170 ($44,927 in 2025 dollars). A total of 62,535 were built.

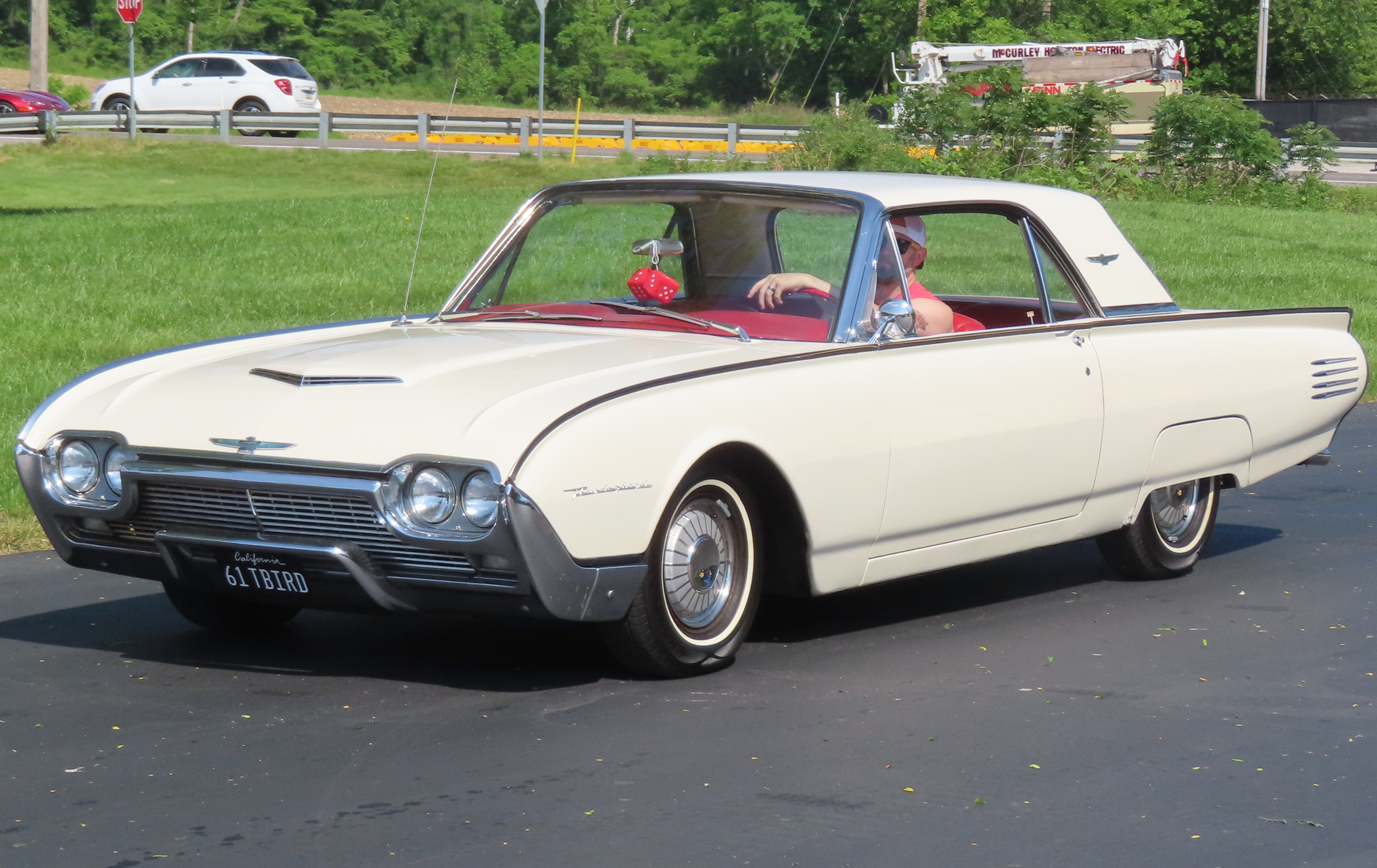
1961 Ford Thunderbird hardtop

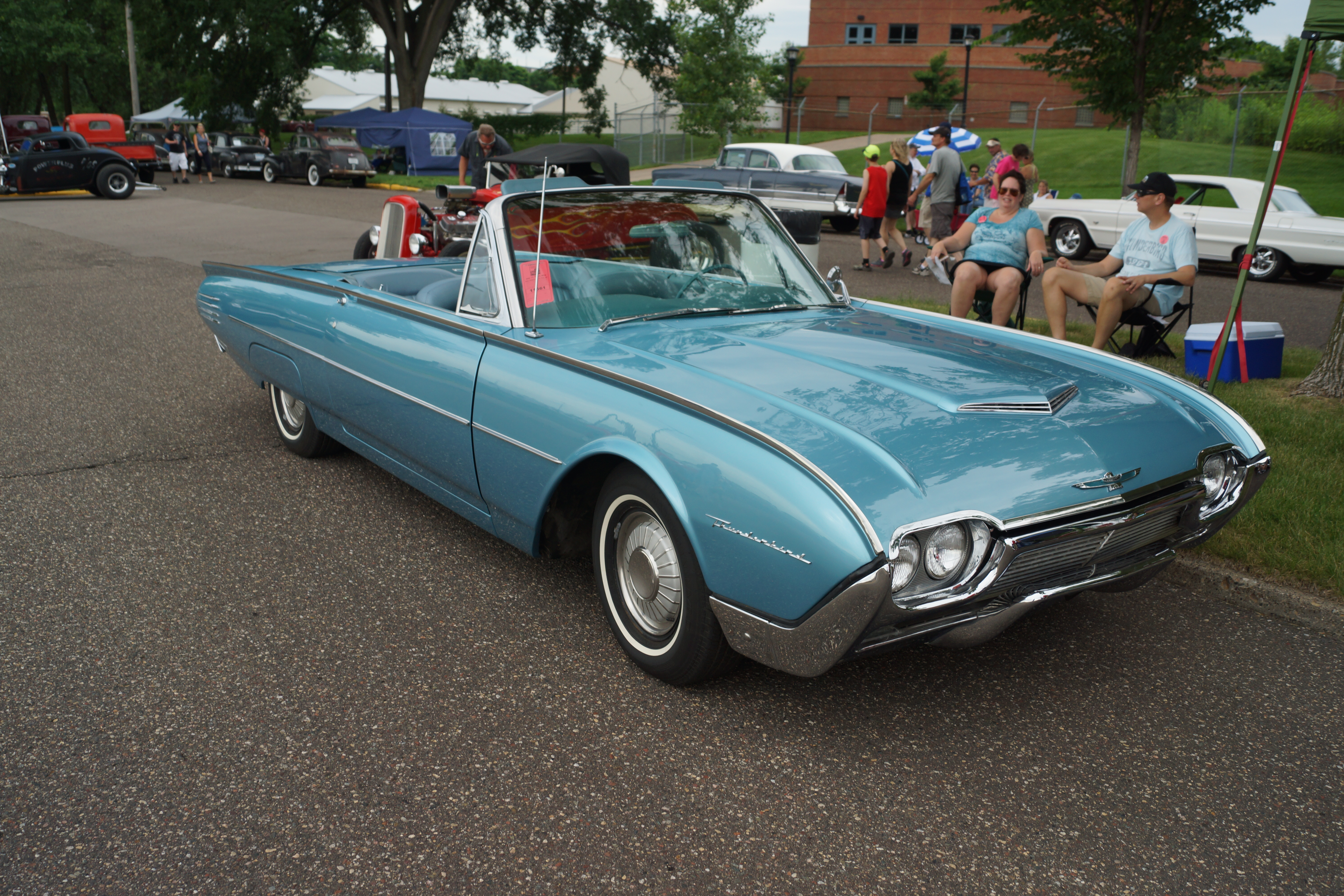
1961 Ford Thunderbird convertible

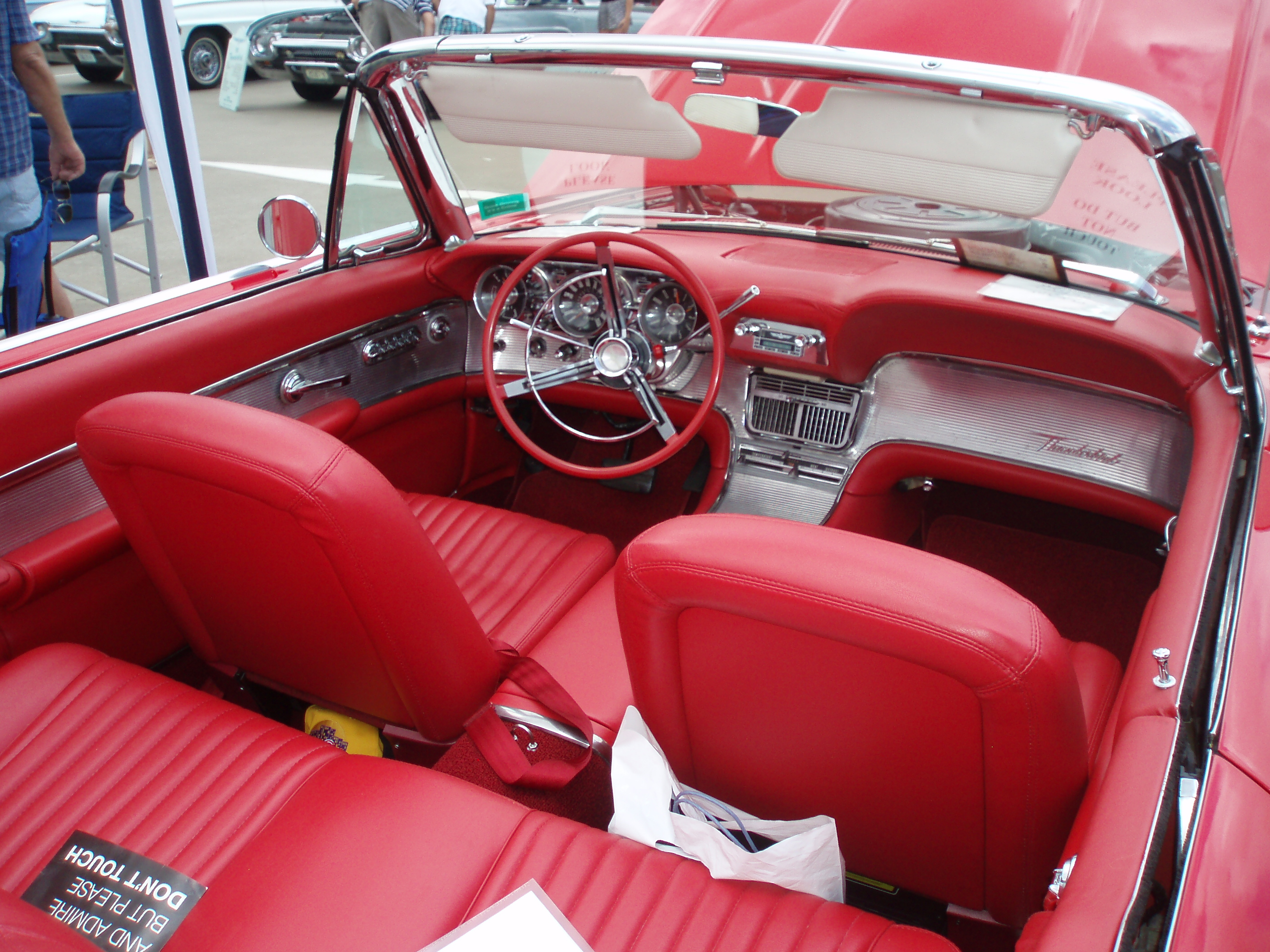
1961 Ford Thunderbird convertible interior with "Swing-Away" steering wheel

== 1962 ==
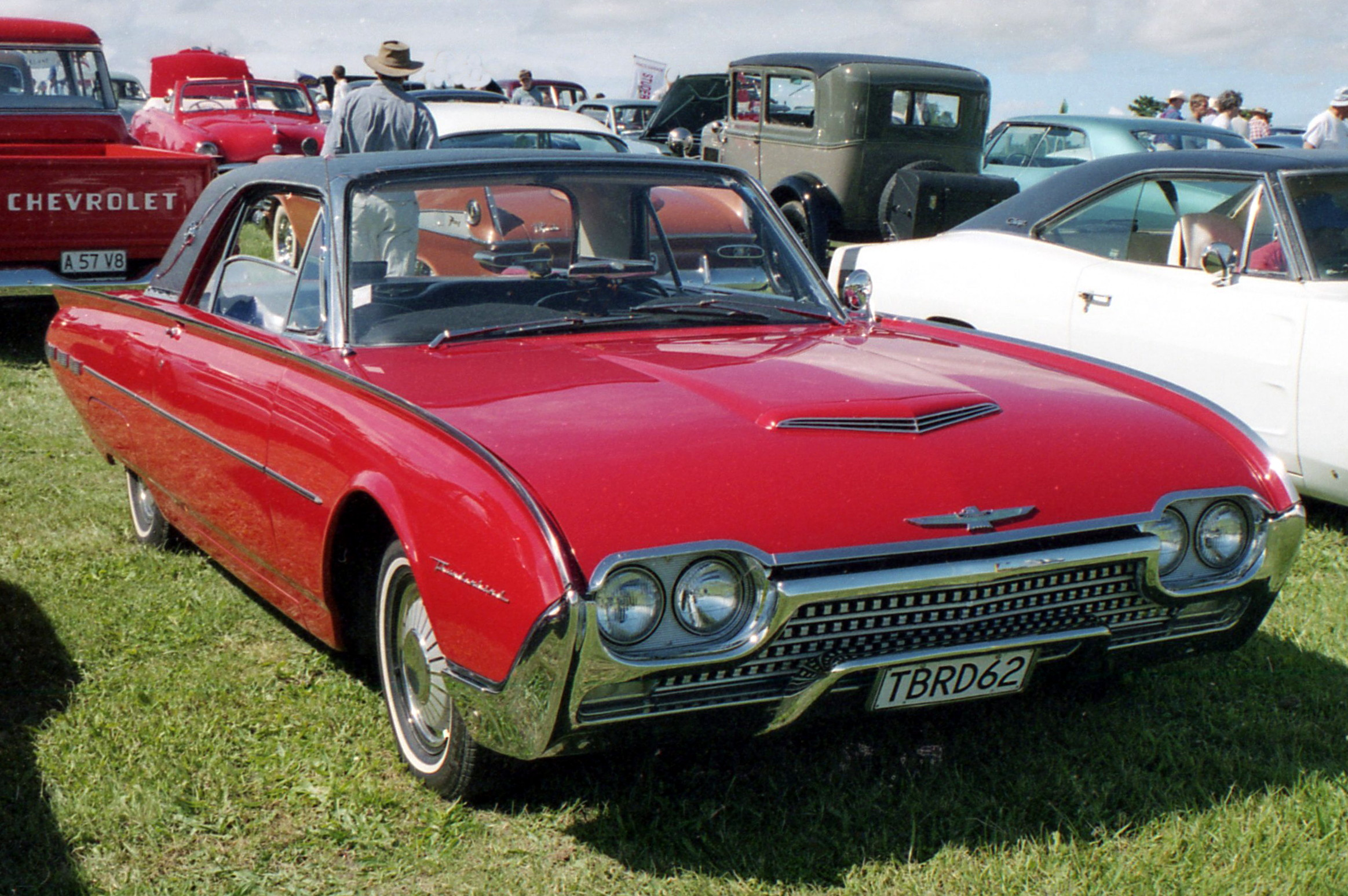
1962 Ford Thunderbird Landau coupe

The 1962 model year saw strong sales figures of 78,011 units (including 9,884 convertibles).

A high-performance option for 1962 added "tripower" – three 2-barrel carburetors – to a higher-compression version of the 390 engine. It used 406 heads as well as the same carburetors that were found on the high-performance 406-powered Ford Galaxie, but with a modified version of the intake manifold to allow for proper air flow under the engine. This special engine code (VIN engine code M) option was quietly discontinued halfway through the mid 1963 production run.

Also introduced in 1962 was the Landau model, with a vinyl roof and simulated S-bars on the rear pillars. This was the beginning of the 1960s/1970s fashion for vinyl roof treatments, and a vinyl roof remained a popular Thunderbird feature for the next 20 years.

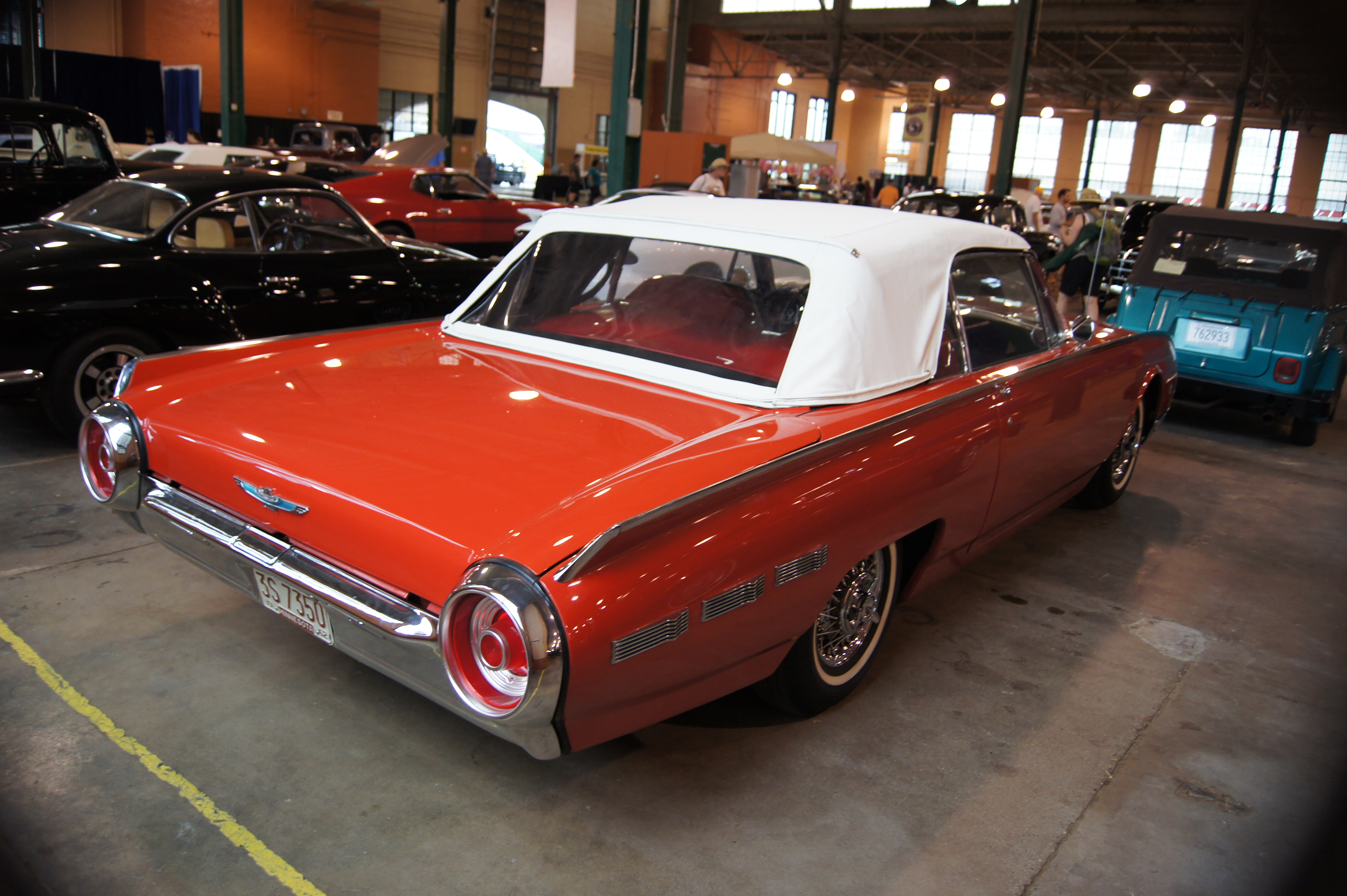
1962 Ford Thunderbird Sports Roadster

In addition, the 1962 model year saw the introduction of the Thunderbird Sports Roadster, a limited production version of the convertible which added 48 spoke Kelsey-Hayes designed wire wheels, special badges to the front fenders and a passenger side grab bar to the front dashboard. The most striking addition to the Sports Roadster was a fiberglass tonneau cover which covered the back seat of the car and created a two seater appearance. 1,427 Sports Roadsters were produced in 1962, including 120 models with the special M Code option. Early models suffered from problems related to their specially designed wire wheels. The problem was quickly corrected when Elvis Presley was involved in an accident in which one of the Kelsey-Hayes wheels collapsed during hard turning.

== 1963 ==
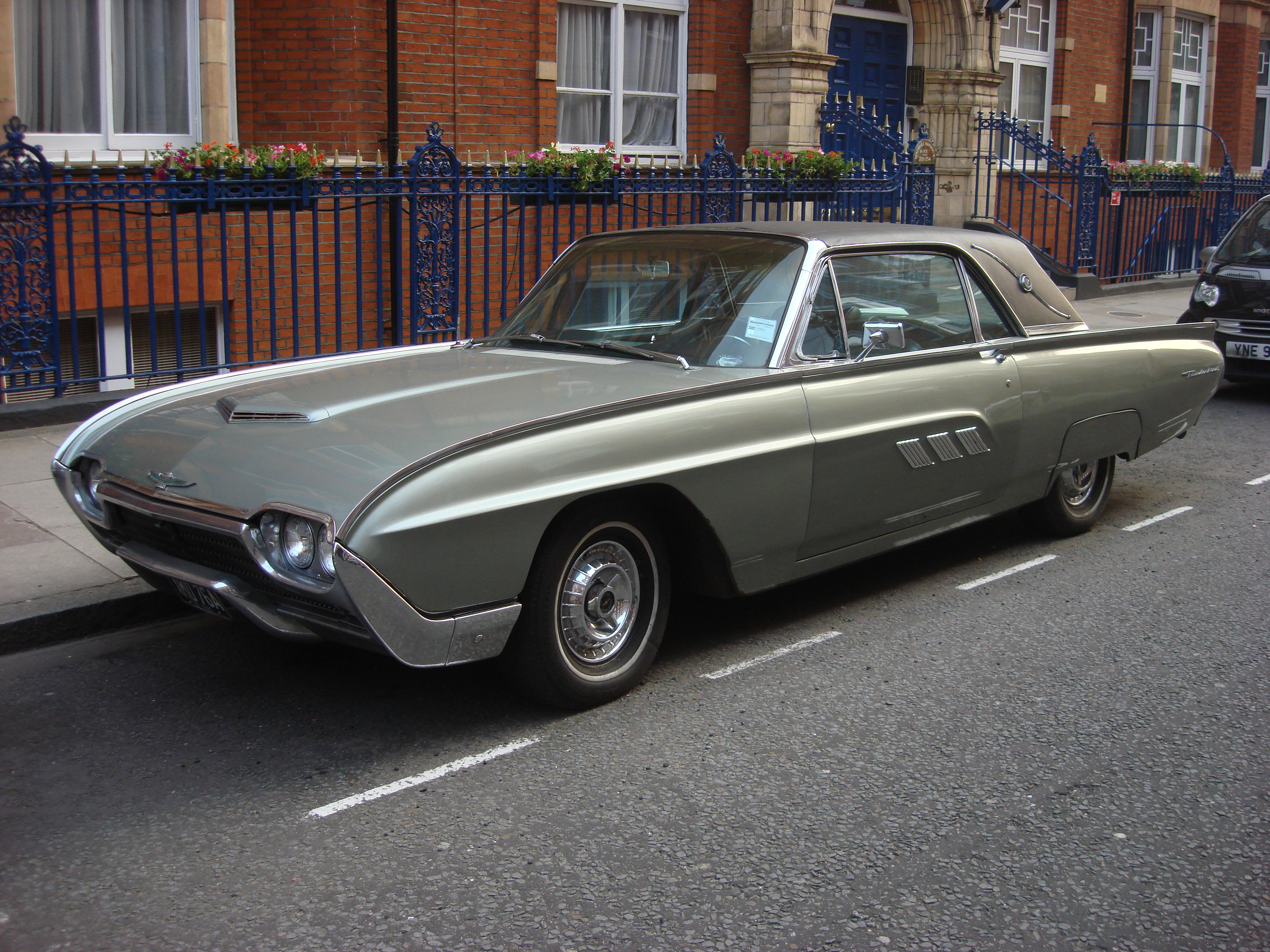
1963 Ford Thunderbird Landau

Changes for 1963 were relatively mild. An AM radio and a remote driver's side mirror became standard, while vacuum assisted door locks and an AM/FM radio were added as options.

That year's sale numbers were somewhat down, at 63,313 units. The Landau became the second most important model after the standard hardtop, at 12,193 sold. Landaus added simulated wood grain interior trim to go along with the landau top. In addition, a Limited Edition "Principality of Monaco" Landau model was introduced. This Maroon vinyl roof with Corinthian White exterior body with a white leather interior, dark red carpeting with rosewood dashboard applique instead of the stainless steel insert was personalized with a plaque displaying the owner's name and the car's limited production number, was limited to and sold only 2,000 units. Only 5,913 convertibles and 455 Sports Roadsters sold, indicating a decline in convertible popularity at the time.

== Production totals ==
Year	Production
1961	73,051
1962	78,011
1963	63,313
Total	214,375
