= AMC Matador =

Large-sized car model produced by American Motors Corporation

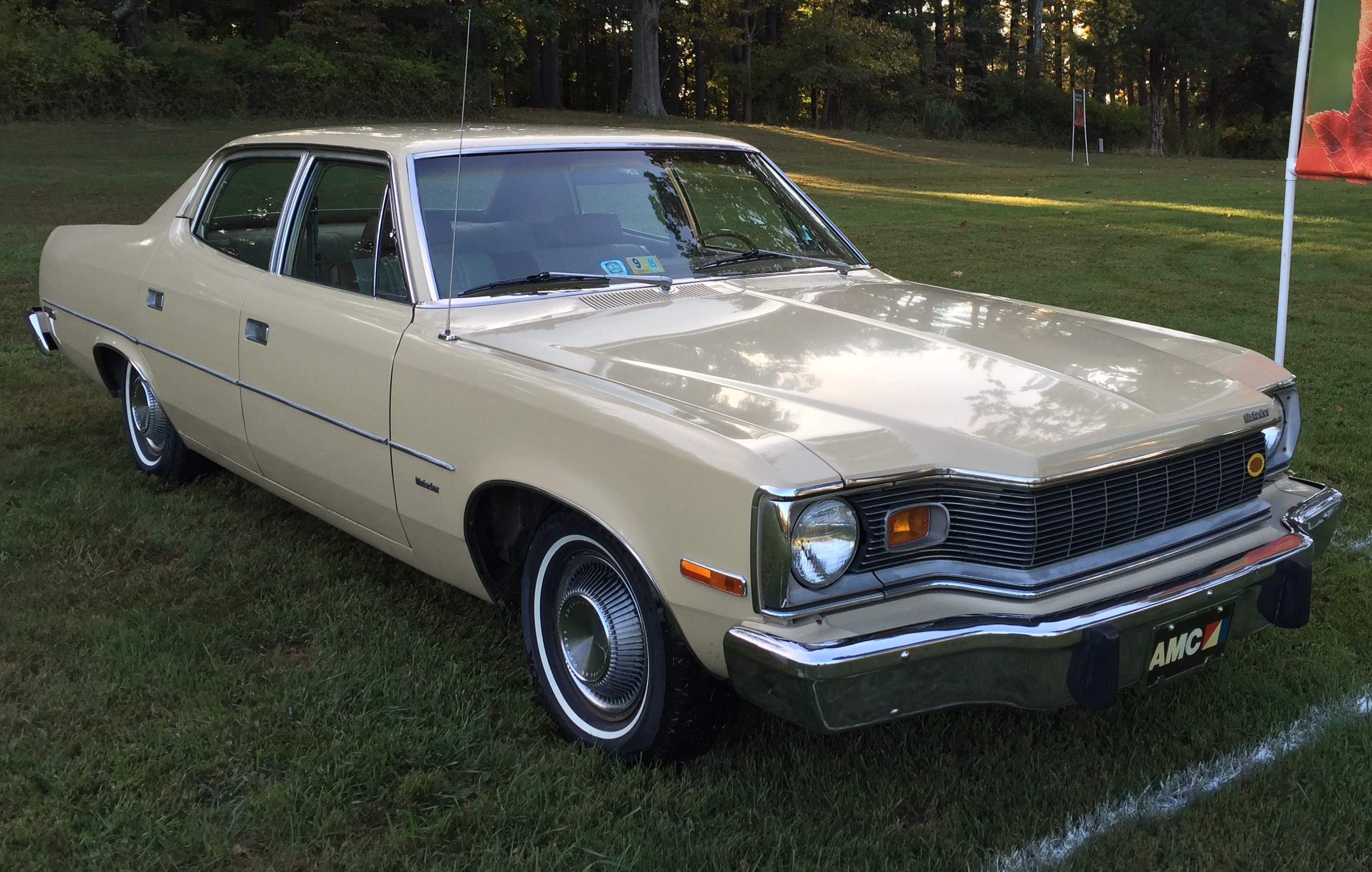
- 1975 AMC Matador sedan

Overview
- Manufacturer: American Motors Corporation
- Also called: American Motors Matador; Rambler Matador (export markets); VAM Classic (Mexico)
- Production: 1970–1978
- Assembly: United States: Kenosha, Wisconsin (Kenosha Engine); Australia: Port Melbourne (AMI); Costa Rica: San José (Purdy Motors); Mexico: Mexico City (VAM)
- Designer: Dick Teague

Body and chassis
- Class: Mid-size (1971–1973 and coupes); Full-size (1974–1978 sedans and wagons)
- Layout: FR layout
- Related: AMC Ambassador

Chronology
- Predecessor: AMC Rebel; AMC Ambassador (since 1974)

The AMC Matador is a series of mid- and full-size automobiles produced by American Motors Corporation (AMC) from 1971 through 1978 model years. Initially positioned as a mid-size family car, the Matador spanned two distinct generations: the first (1971–1973) featured two-door hardtop, four-door sedan, and station wagon body styles, while the second (1974–1978) transitioned to a full-size platform, offering two-door coupes as well as four-door sedans and wagons.

While aimed at the family market, the first-generation Matador also saw performance-oriented versions. The two-door versions were successfully campaigned in NASCAR racing with factory support from 1972 until 1975.

After AMC discontinued the Ambassador line in 1974, the second-generation Matador became the automaker's flagship full-size model. Premium trim levels of the coupe, marketed as the Barcelona and the Oleg Cassini versions, targeted the personal luxury car segment.

The Matador sedan became popular as a police car in the United States and was featured in several 1970s television series. The newly introduced Matador coupe was featured in the 1974 James Bond film, The Man with the Golden Gun.

Internationally, the Matador continued to be marketed under the Rambler marque and assembled under license in Costa Rica, Mexico, and Australia. American Motors also exported right-hand-drive versions to markets such as the United Kingdom.

== Background ==
The introduction of the Matador for the 1971 model year was AMC's attempt to reposition its intermediate-size models in the market segment and to respond to the sociopolitical shifts of the late 1960s. As the counterculture movement of the Vietnam era intensified, American Motors executives concluded that the "Rebel" moniker - previously a symbol of youthful independence - had acquired negative connotations that no longer resonated with the more family-oriented views of the 1970s.

Market research by AMC led to the adoption of "Matador," a name intended to evoke power and precision, albeit one associated with bullfighting. This rebranding sought to emphasize AMC's offer in the intermediate-sized segment, a market popular with middle-class American families. Cars in this segment typically had wheelbases from 114 to 118 inches (2,900 to 3,000 mm), and weighed from 3,500 to 3,700 pounds (1,590 to 1,680 kg). They were often powered by 300 to 360 cu in (4.9 to 5.9 L) V8 engines reflecting consumers' desire for performance with the emerging economic need for efficiency. The objective of the repositioning was to elevate AMC's standing in the fiercely competitive intermediate-car market even though many buyers gravitated to compacts and subcompacts.

To upgrade the Matador's standing, AMC shifted its $15 million national advertising account to Cunningham & Walsh agency in 1972, ending its relationship with Wells, Rich, Greene. American Motors executives decided they needed a larger and more traditional marketing agency to overcome many problems with its automobile division. The new marketing agency was tasked with developing "positive awareness" for its cars, specifically addressing low consumer recognition. This marketing effort culminated in the "What's a Matador?" campaign, which utilized self-deprecating humor to embed the new nameplate with buyers. While unconventional for the automotive industry, the campaign was empirically successful in increasing consumer familiarity, brand awareness, and dealership traffic.

While consumer sales remained steady with the sedan and station wagon models known for their "excellent value", the Matador also found success in the fleet and municipal markets. The 1971 through 1975 sedans and wagons, equipped with heavy-duty police packages and 360 or 401 cu in (5.9 or 6.6 L) V8 engines, were widely regarded by law enforcement agencies as superior tactical vehicles. Many police and other government agencies, including the Los Angeles Police Department (LAPD), favored the Matador for its durability and high-speed stability. The vehicles often remained in service for extended periods due to their favorable field performance

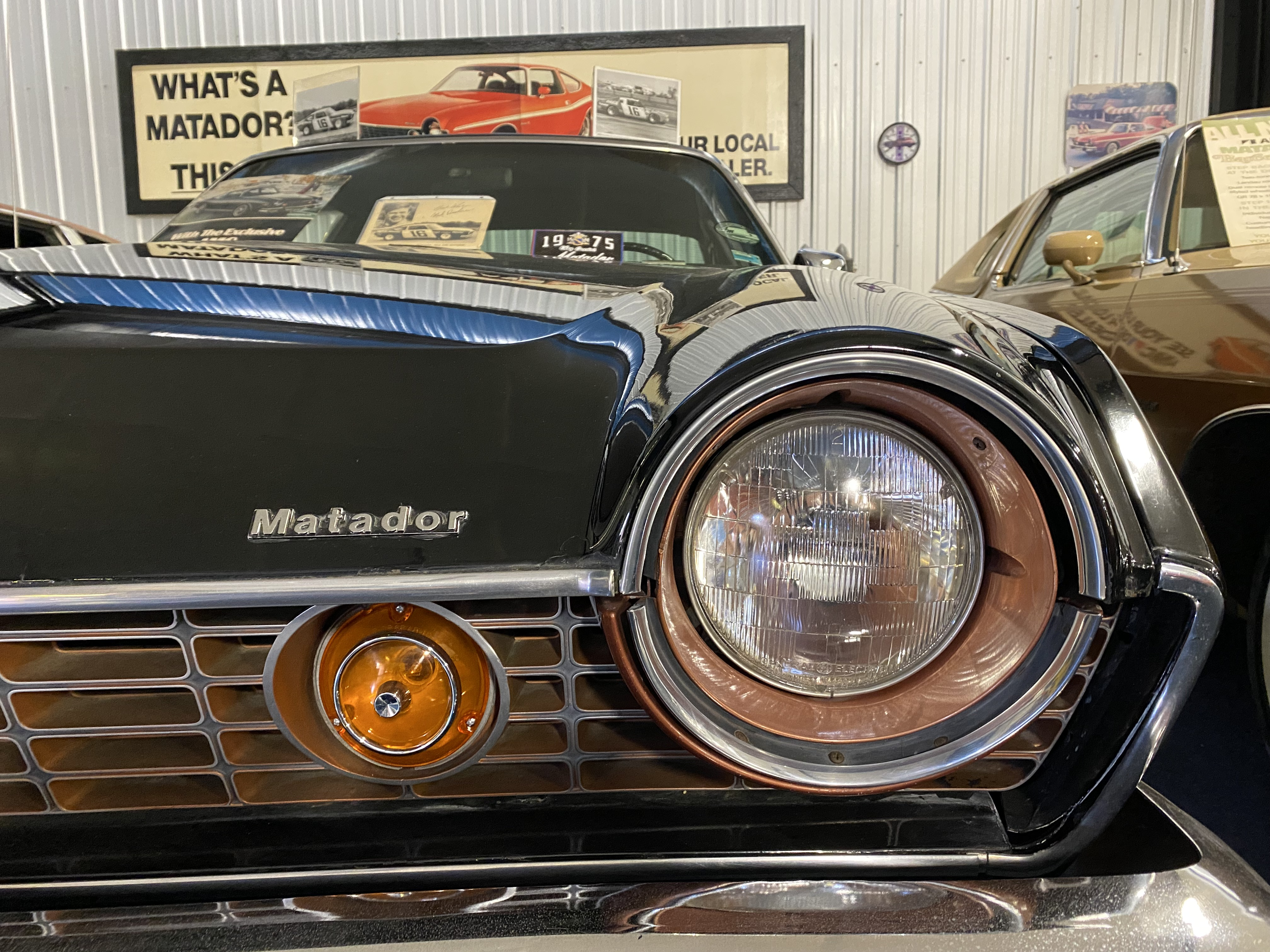
1975 AMC Matador Oleg Cassini coupe at Rambler Ranch

The 1974 model year introduced the second-generation Matadors and a significant divergence within the line. The new models incorporated the major upgrade in safety standards mandating a no-damage 5-mile-per-hour (8 km/h) impact-absorbing bumper system in the front and rear. While the four-door sedan and wagon remained utilitarian in their boxy designs, AMC introduced a new two-door model. Two factors influenced these changes. The expected U.S. Federal safety requirements meant a B-pillar with a steel "hoop" integrated into the roofline (rather than the previous hardtop or pillarless design) as a proactive step in the evolving federal roof-crush standards. These pillars followed the design cues of General Motors' 1973 model year "Colonnade" style "A" platform intermediate cars. Another objective for AMC was to have a fresh design in the popular intermediate-size segment and the burgeoning "personal luxury" market that emerged after the muscle car era.

The result was unlike its competitors' intermediate two-door models, which shared sheet metal with their four-door counterparts. The new Matador coupe was longer, wider, lower, and shared no design elements with the sedan or wagon. Its fastback silhouette and flared fenders were described as "polarizing," evoking a design that was both praised for its aerodynamics and criticized for its ergonomic constraints in the interior.

Factory-backed first-generation hardtops and second-generation coupes competed in NASCAR racing from 1972 through 1975, with drivers Mark Donohue and Bobby Allison achieving several victories, including Allison's 1975 Southern 500 win at Darlington. The AMC Matador secured five first-place wins in the NASCAR competitions.

Matadors in police livery were prominent in 1970s television shows and movies. The second-generation Matador coupe was a featured car, with special effects for its flying in The Man with the Golden Gun, a James Bond film released in 1974.

== First generation ==
First generation
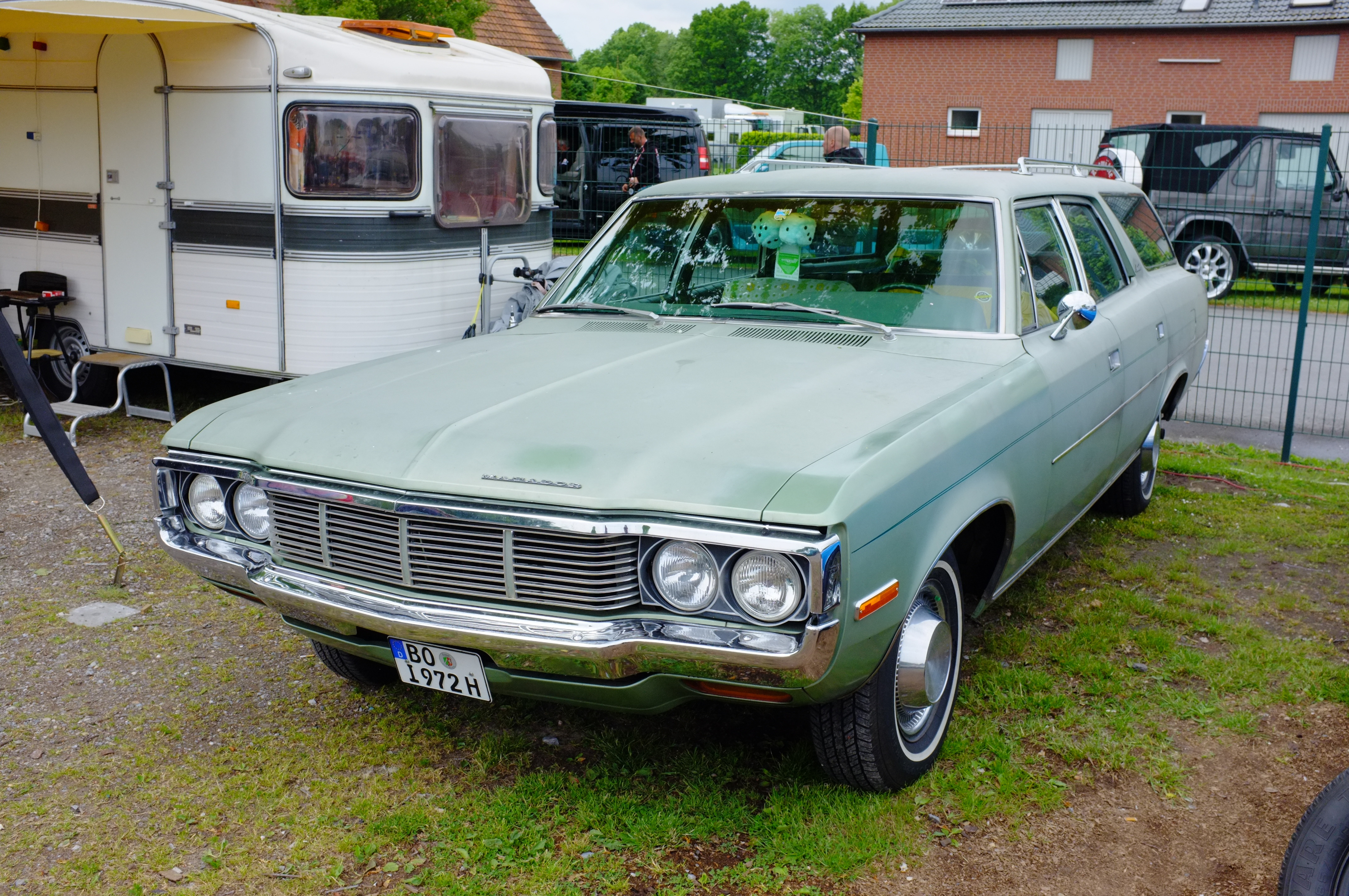
- 1972 AMC Matador station wagon

Overview
- Model years: 1971–1973

Body and chassis
- Body style: 2-door hardtop; 4-door sedan; 4-door station wagon

Powertrain
- Engine: 232 cu in (3.8 L) AMC I6; 252 cu in (4.1 L) VAM I6 (Mexico only); 258 cu in (4.2 L) AMC I6; 282 cu in (4.6 L) VAM I6 (Mexico only); 304 cu in (5.0 L) AMC V8; 360 cu in (5.9 L) AMC V8; 401 cu in (6.6 L) AMC V8
- Transmission: 3-speed manual; 4-speed manual (1971 only); 3-speed Shift-Command automatic (1971 only); 3-speed Torque-Command automatic

Dimensions
- Wheelbase: 118 in (2,997 mm)
- Length: 206.1 in (5,235 mm) hardtop and sedan; 205 in (5,207 mm) wagon
- Height: 53.8 in (1,367 mm) hardtop and sedan; 56.4 in (1,433 mm) wagon

=== 1971 ===
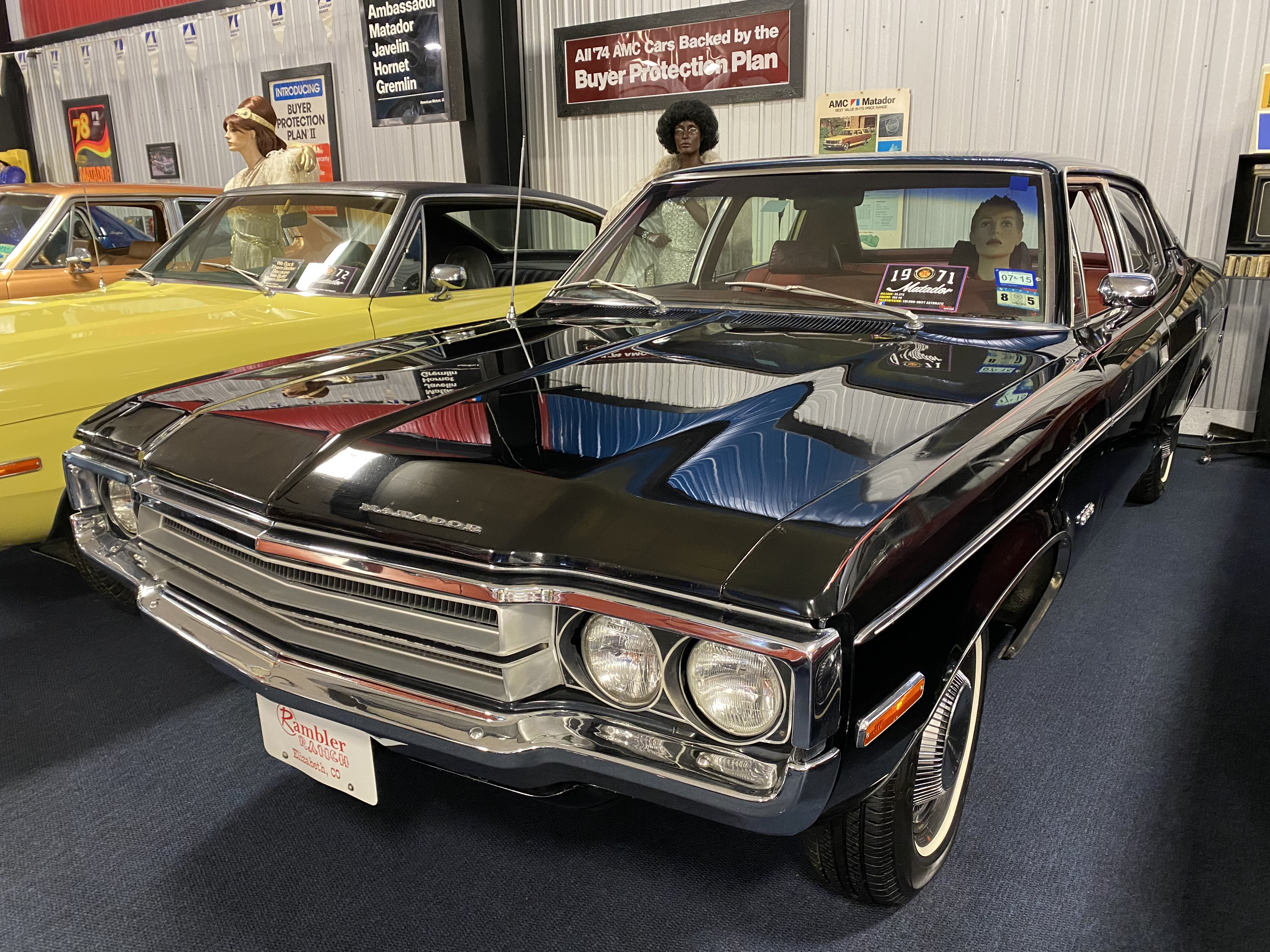
1971 Matador sedan

American Motors provided a styling refresh for its newly named intermediate-sized 1971 models, primarily focused on the front fascia across the three body styles. The Matador shared the platform and body design from the firewall rearward with the full-size AMC Ambassador. Revisions for 1971 included lengthening the wheelbase by 4 in (102 mm), to improve the ride. The front styling featured a new grille, chrome trim, and a lighter "wraparound" bumper.

The sedan and hardtop models retained several carryover elements from the 1970 AMC Rebel. They included the rear bumper, trunk lid chrome strip, and rear-corner chrome garnishes. The backup and tail lights were now incorporated into three square lenses with rounded corners. The interior, dashboard, instrument cluster, steering wheel, and armrests were carried over from the 1970 model. The "Weather Eye" fan-heat control unit mounted on the left side continued the arrangement introduced in 1967.

The marketing campaign for the 1971 Matador emphasized that the car represented more than just a name change and facelift. The new "Matador" nameplate was chosen to distance the car from the negative connotations of social unrest throughout the country and the association with the "Rebel" name. The "What's a Matador?" advertising campaign was launched to establish a distinct marketing identity for the car, aiming to create a sense of intrigue and curiosity among consumers. This self-disparaging marketing approach, which acknowledged the car's somewhat anonymous styling, paradoxically "turned the styling of anonymity into an asset. Consumer research polls conducted by AMC revealed that the "Matador" name evoked feelings of virility and excitement among consumers, aligning with the company's desired image. However, AMC encountered difficulties in certain markets such as Puerto Rico, where the term "matador" retained its literal bullfighting connotation, meaning "killer," presenting a marketing challenge.

The Matador station wagon design was continued, with an optional rear-facing third-row bench seat, increasing passenger capacity from six to eight. Standard equipment included a roof rack and a two-way tailgate. With the rear window retracted, the tailgate could be opened downward using a center-mounted release handle, extending the load surface. Alternatively, it could be swung open like a door using a handle on the right side and engaging hinges on the left side of the tailgate.

The Matador offered a range of powertrain options. The base I6 engine was a 232 cu in (3.8 L) with a 258 cu in (4.2 L) version optional. The standard V8 engine displaced 304 cu in (5.0 L), with other V8 engines available. Transmission choices included the base column-shifted three-speed manual, a Borg-Warner sourced "Shift-Command" three-speed automatic, and a floor-shifted four-speed manual with V8 engines.

==== Machine Go package ====
The popularity of muscle cars declined due to rising fuel prices, higher insurance costs for high-horsepower cars, and stricter emissions regulations that required designing cleaner-burning engines using lower-octane, lead-free gasoline. This combination was enough to force AMC to discontinue its high-performance Rebel Machine model after just one year. Instead, an optional "Machine Go package" of performance enhancements was offered as an option, not a model designation, for the 1971 Matador two-door hardtop. It included many of those the Rebel Machine had had, with other options available individually; but without any specific "Machine" designation, badges, or marketing. The only engines available with the Go package were the 360 cu in (5.9 L) V8 (an additional $373 option) and the newly introduced 401 cu in (6.6 L), AMC's largest engine ($461 extra over the standard 304 cu in (5.0 L) V8). Red-white-blue striping as offered on the Rebel Machine was not available, nor was its standard factory-installed ram air hood scoop.

Included with the "Machine Go" package were 15x7-inch "slot-style" wheels, L60x15 raised white-lettered Goodyear Polyglas tires, a "Space-Saver" spare, power disc brakes, and a "handling package" that included heavy-duty springs, shocks, and rear sway bar. Dual exhaust came with the base 360 cu in (5.9 L) V8 engine "Machine Go" version. A four-speed manual transmission with a floor-mounted shifter was offered on "Go package" cars with 3.54 standard and available 3.15 or 3.91 rear axle ratios. Automatic transmission shifters were column-mounted or on the available center console with bucket seats. The standard rear axle ratio was 2.87, with 3.15 optional, while 3.54 was available on units with console-mounted automatic and the 401 engine. A "Twin-Grip" differential was optional, but recommended with the performance package and required with the optional 3.91 rear end.

Approximately fifty Matadors with the "Machine Go" package were produced for the 1971 model year.

=== 1972 ===
The 1972 Matador was positioned as a "family car" and continued with a few changes in sedan, two-door hardtop, and a station wagon with two or three rows of seats. The 232 cu in (3.8 L) I6 was standard on sedans and the hardtop, with the wagon including the 258 cu in (4.2 L) I6 engine as standard. A three-speed column manual transmission was standard with the I6 engines. A total of five different horsepower versions of V8s - 150 bhp (112 kW; 152 PS), 175 bhp (130 kW; 177 PS), 195 bhp (145 kW; 198 PS), 220 bhp (164 kW; 223 PS), and 255 bhp (190 kW; 259 PS), were optional and available only with a column-mounted automatic transmission. The previous Borg-Warner sourced "Shift-Command" three-speed automatic transmission was replaced by the Chrysler-built TorqueFlite three-speed automatic that AMC marketed as "Torque-Command". The optional four-speed manual was discontinued. All engines were designed to use no-lead, low-octane gasoline. New rocker arms and bearings provided quiet valve train operation.

The 1972 model year introduced AMC's innovative "Buyer Protection Plan" to address increasing consumer demands. This was the automobile industry's first 12-month or 12,000-mile (19,312 km) bumper-to-bumper warranty. American Motors started with an emphasis on quality and durability by focusing on its component sourcing, improving production that included reducing the number of models, mechanical upgrades, and increasing standard equipment. This was followed by an innovative promise to its customers to repair anything wrong with the car (except for tires). Owners were provided with a toll-free number to the company, as well as a complimentary loaner car if a warranty repair took overnight. The objective was to reduce warranty claims, improve public relations, and foster greater customer satisfaction and loyalty. Dealers evaluated this "revolutionary" coverage as successful in bringing buyers into the showroom, providing a sales tool that other brands did not offer, and the quality of the cars resulted in improved ownership satisfaction.

Externally, the 1972 models were the same as the 1971 versions, retaining the same front end, but now with a simplified grille design. The chrome trunk lid strip and rear corner chrome found on the 1970 Rebels and 1971 Matadors were dropped. The 1972 model received a new taillight lens assembly, divided into nine vertically recessed rectangular lenses. The new models saw the return of the round instrument dials of earlier Ambassador and 1967 Rebel models. The steering wheel resembled the 1970 Rebel and 1971 Matador models. New for the 1972 model were slimmer door armrests and a bench seat without the fold-down center armrests. Individual reclining front seats were an option for all body styles, with optional front bucket seats and center armrests on the hardtops.

Production of 1972 Matadors included 36,899 sedans, 10,448 station wagons, and 7,306 two-door hardtops.

1972

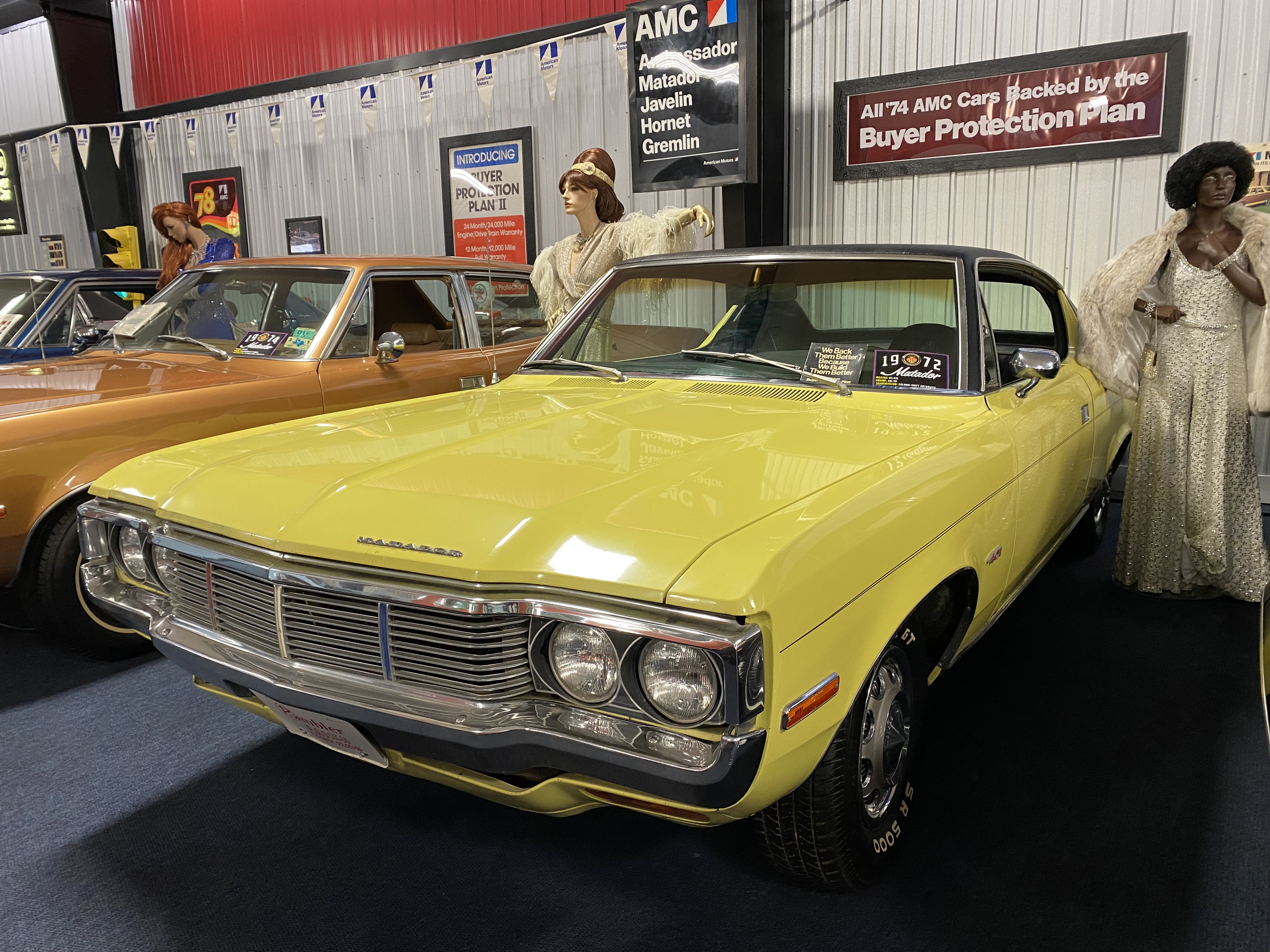
1972 Matador two-door hardtop

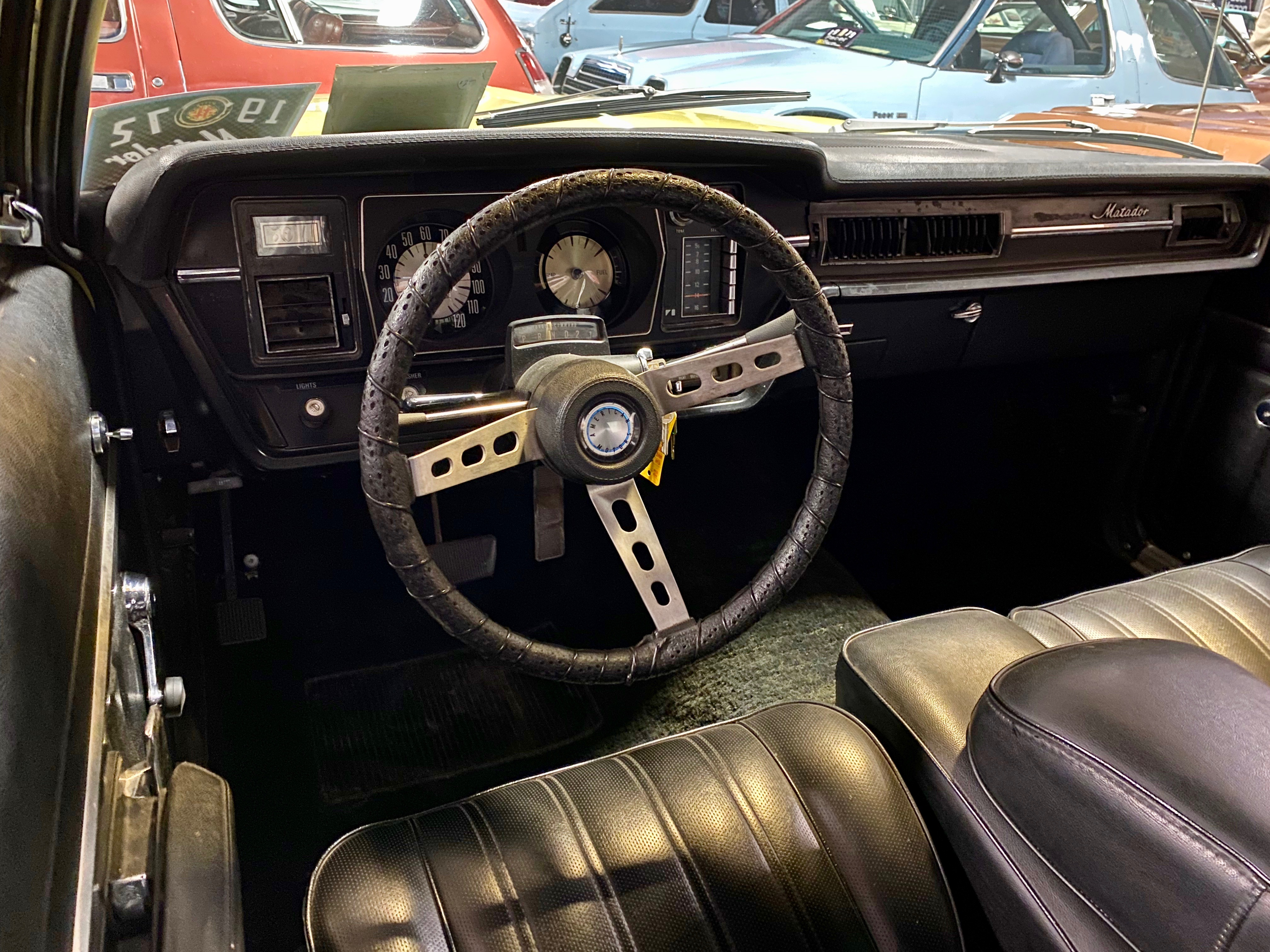
1972 Matador interior

=== 1973 ===
The Matador hardtop, sedan, and station wagon body styles came in only one trim model for 1973, with numerous appearance and comfort options. The 1973 model year brought new U.S. National Highway Traffic Safety Administration (NHTSA) regulations that required all passenger cars to withstand a 5-mile-per-hour (8 km/h) front and a 2.5-mile-per-hour (4 km/h) rear impacts without damage to the engine, lights, or safety equipment. Matadors gained stronger front and rear bumpers. The front bumper included self-restoring telescoping shock absorbers and more prominent vertical rubber guards. In contrast, the rear bumper gained vertical black rubber bumper guards, replacing a pair of similar, previously optional chrome bumper guards.

Aside from changes to the bumpers, the 1973 model's design was identical to that of the 1972 model, except for new taillight lens assemblies and a slightly different grille pattern. The dash and instrument cluster of the 1972 model were carried over. However, the steering wheel horn pad no longer included a "bullseye" emblem, which had been used since the last year of the Rebel models. The full-width bench seat was standard with 50-50 individually adjustable and reclining seats were optional on all body styles. The station wagons came with "Uganda" vinyl upholstery, while the two-door hardtops offered optional front bucket seats.

All V8-powered Matadors included a TorqueFlite 998 automatic transmission and a column-mounted shifter. The V8 Autolite 2100 carburetor was replaced with the modified Motorcraft 2150 carburetor. The 232 cu in (3.8 L) I6 was the base engine with a column-mounted three-speed manual transmission, with a 258 cu in (4.2 L) I6 optional, with which only the station wagon could be ordered with manual transmission because almost all six-cylinder powered Matadors came with TorqueFlite 904 automatics.

Promotional and publicity efforts for the Matador included sponsorship at NASCAR racing events. Mark Donohue drove a two-door hardtop prepared by Roger Penske on the road course at Riverside, California, on 21 January 1973, lapping the entire field to win this NASCAR Cup Series race. This was also Penske's first NASCAR victory at the Winston Western 500, with Donohue's Matador leading 138 out of the 191 laps.

A comparison of 1973 Matador owners conducted by Popular Mechanics indicated increased satisfaction and fewer problems than was the case with the owners of the essentially similar 1970 AMC Rebel three years earlier.

The intermediate-sized car market segment was growing to almost twenty percent of the total domestic automobile market by 1973. Still, the hardtop was the slowest-selling version in the Matador line, "in a segment where two-door hardtops were customarily the most popular (and profitable) models." Automobile Quarterly reviewed the 1973 cars. It summarized that "AMC actually has a very strong product line, but public awareness of it seems so feeble as to be negligible. ... The Matador became a typical intermediate, a counterpart of the Satellite/Coronet or Torino/Montego", and ranked AMC's car as a "good buy".

1973 AMC Matador

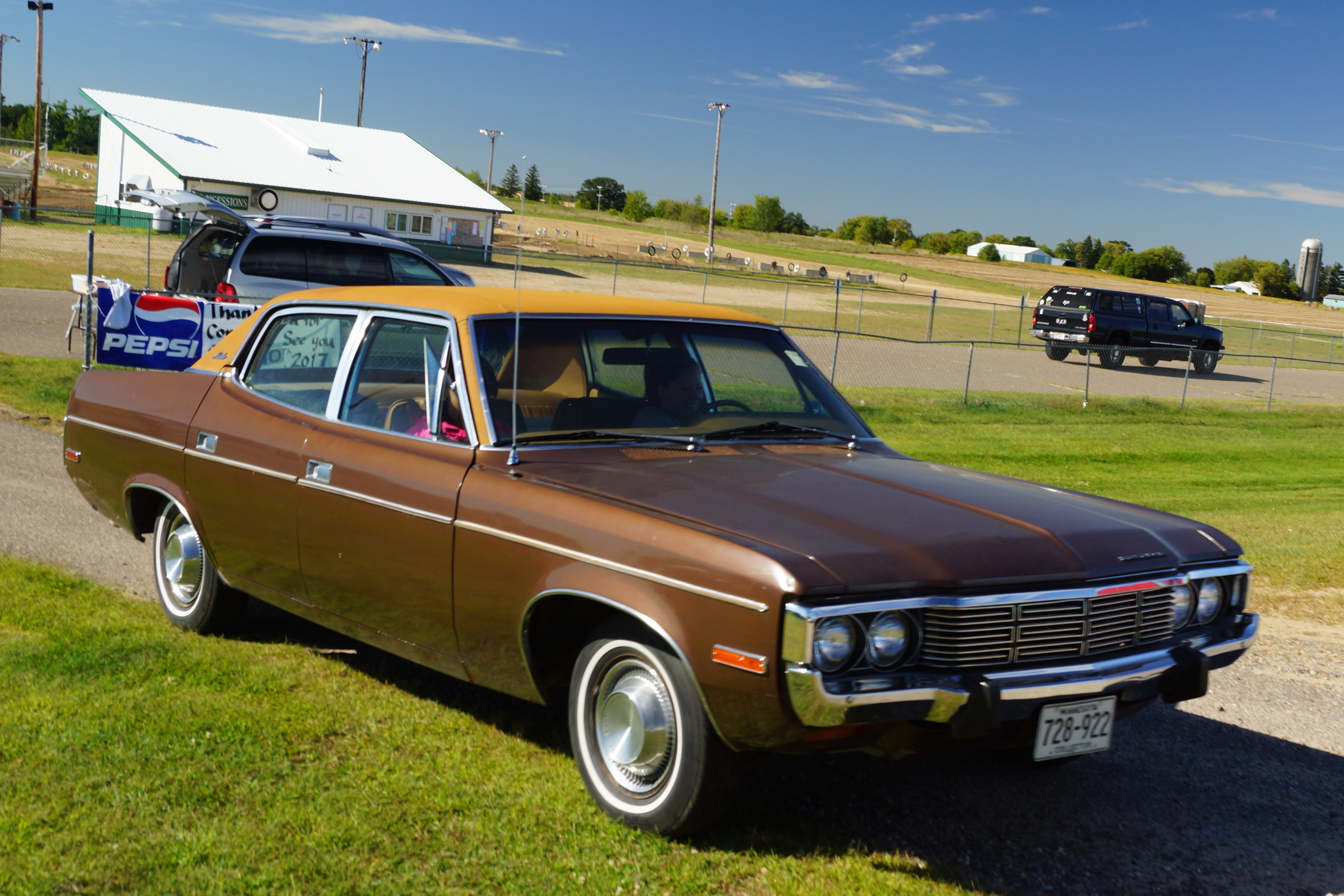
sedan

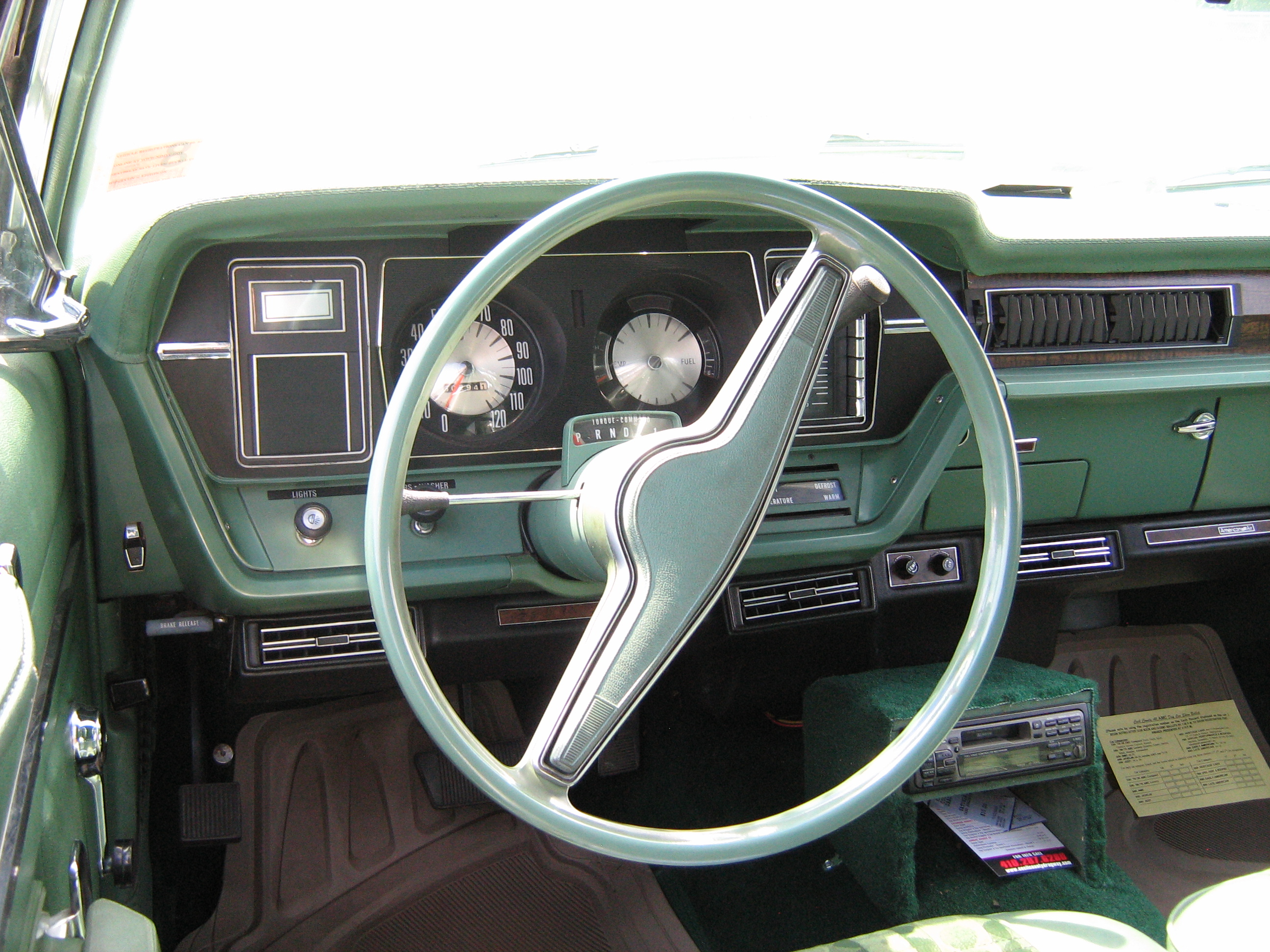
interior

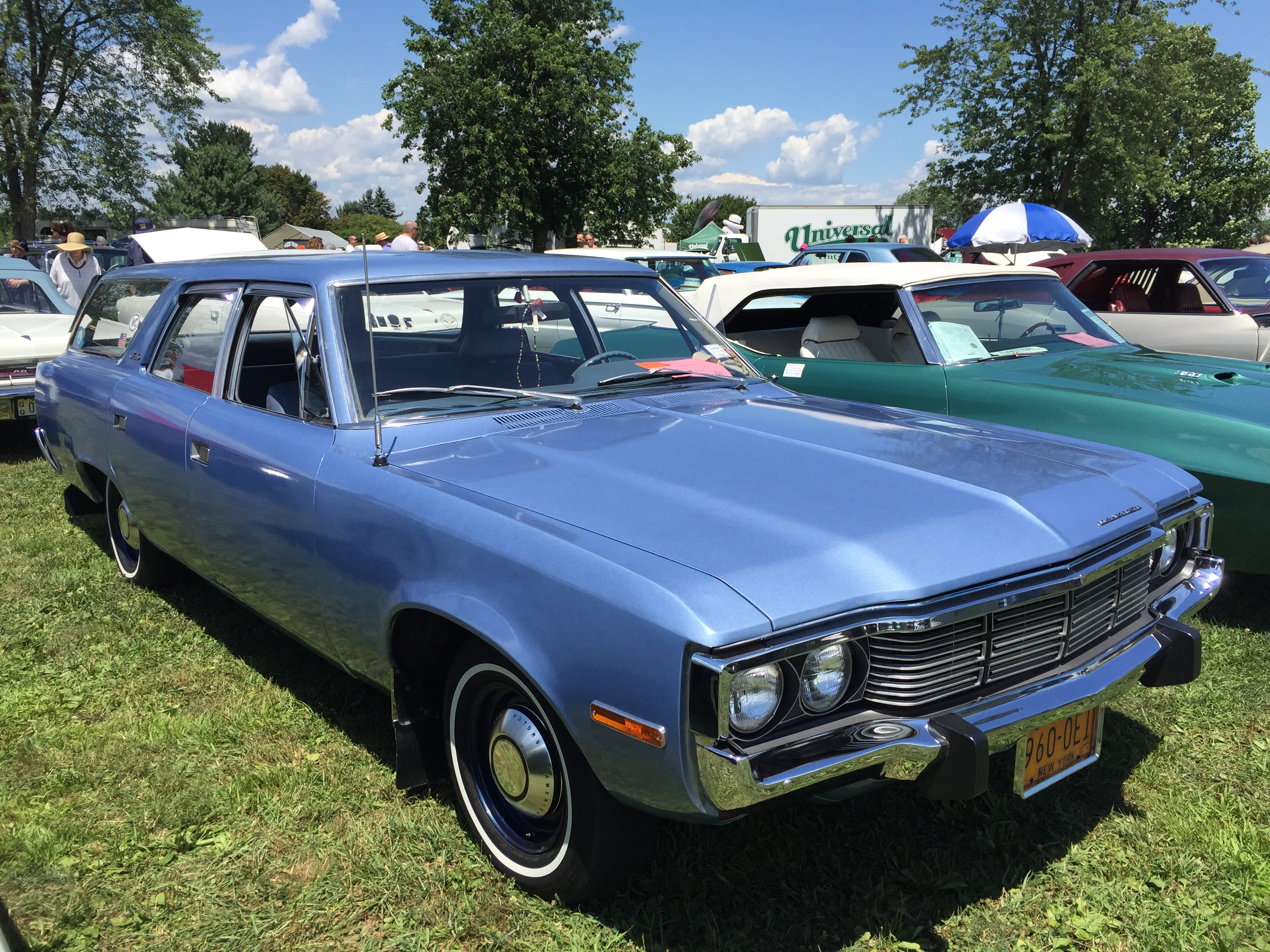
station wagon

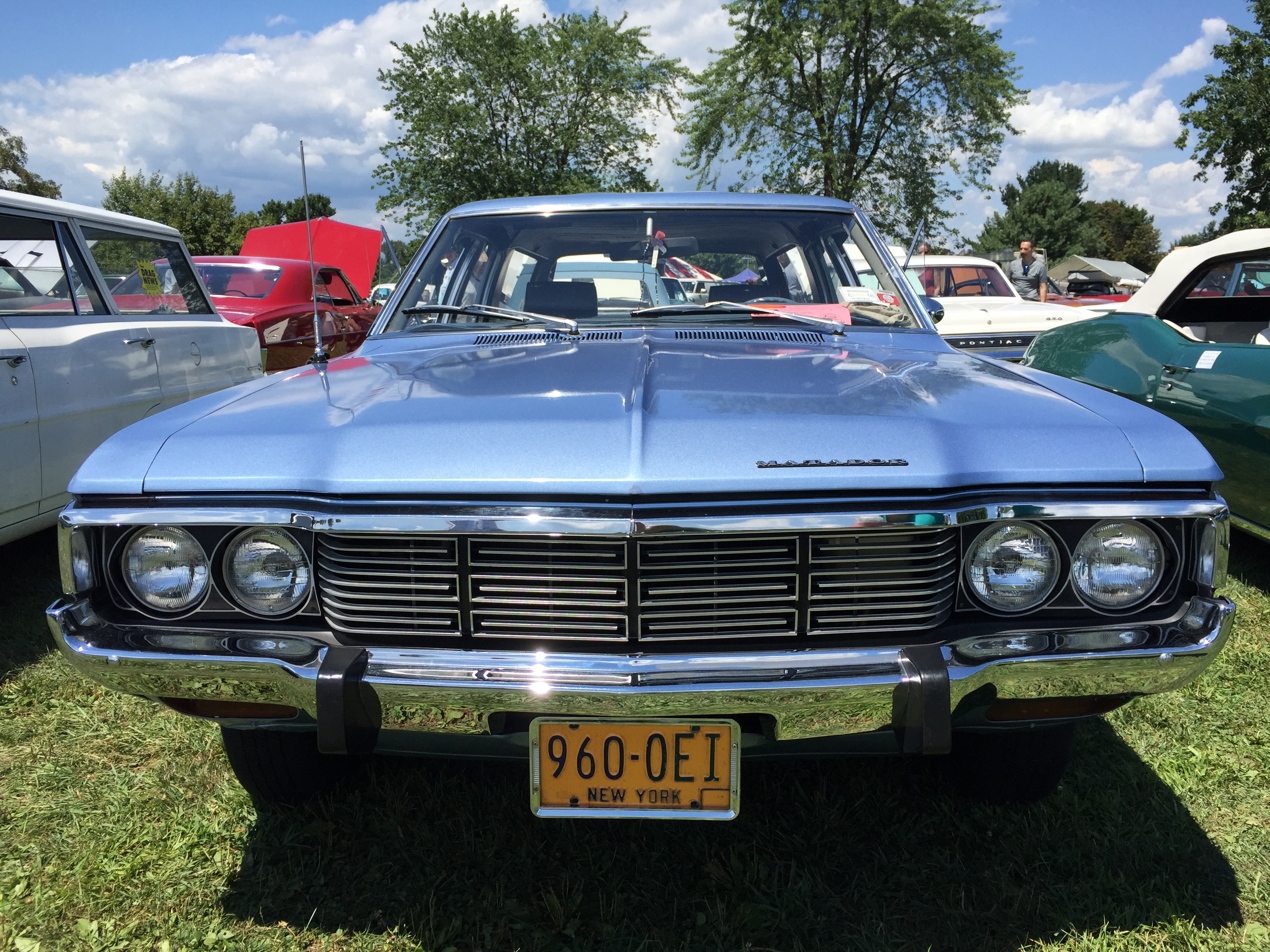
New grille for 1973

== Second generation ==
Second generation
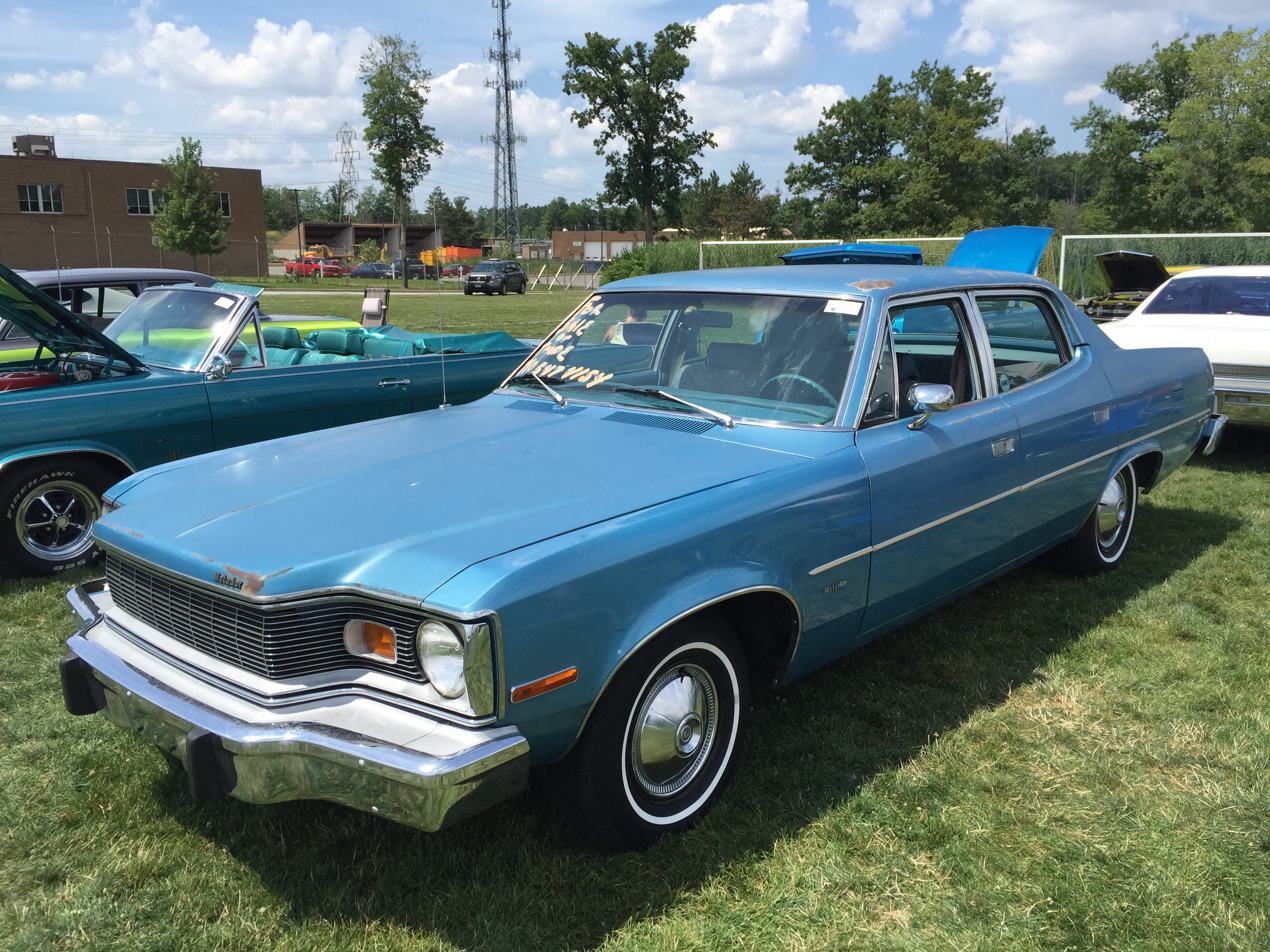
- 1975 Matador base model sedan

Overview
- Model years: 1974–1978

Body and chassis
- Body style: 2-door hardtop coupe; 4-door sedan; 4-door station wagon

Powertrain
- Engine: 232 cu in (3.8 L) I6 (1974 only); 258 cu in (4.2 L) AMC I6; 252 cu in (4.1 L) VAM I6 (Mexico only); 282 cu in (4.6 L) VAM I6 (Mexico only); 304 cu in (5.0 L) V8; 360 cu in (5.9 L) V8; 401 cu in (6.6 L) V8 (1974 only)
- Transmission: 3-speed manual (1974–1976); 3-speed Torque-Command automatic

Dimensions
- Wheelbase: 114 in (2,896 mm) coupe; 118 in (2,997 mm) sedan, wagon
- Length: 209.3 in (5,316 mm) coupe; 216 in (5,486 mm) sedan; 215 in (5,461 mm) wagon
- Height: 51.8 in (1,316 mm) coupe; 53.8 in (1,367 mm) sedan; 56.4 in (1,433 mm) wagon

American Motors was facing many challenges in a dynamic marketplace. The strategy to redesign the Matador for the 1974 model year was what Gerald C. Meyers, vice president of product development, wanted for AMC's mid-sized product range. The intermediate-sized cars were best sellers in the U.S. and the two-door hardtops or coupe versions most popular with consumers. Because styling was most significant selling point, a decision was made to develop a new version of the Matador as a coupe, thus giving designers the freedom to style "rakishly as sheet metal could be made to look" and eliminating the limits of making sedans and station wagons with the same lines.

The 1974 model year saw four-door sedans and station wagons with significant front-end changes, the rear-end on the four-door sedans was revised, and the two-door model became a separate and radically styled pillared coupe. All models included new interiors and paint colors. The previous hardtop body style design was discontinued, and the new two-door coupe no longer shared body parts with the sedan or wagon. The coupe's roofline was significantly lower, and its wheelbase was 4 inches (102 mm) shorter than the four-door versions. These versions are considered to be the "second-generation" Matadors.

=== 1974 ===
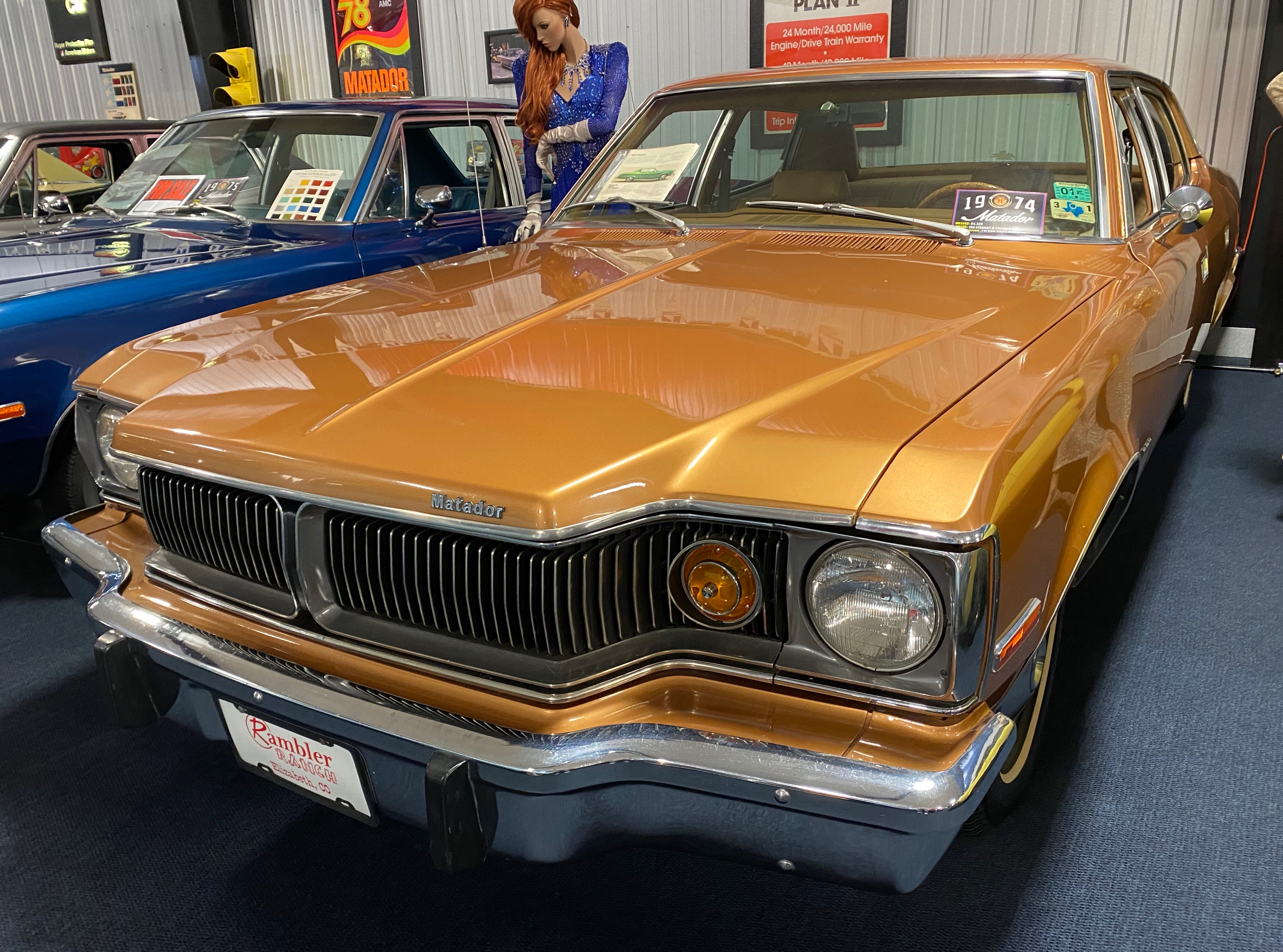
1974 Matador sedan

New passenger car requirements set by NHTSA called for the front and rear passenger car bumpers to have uniform heights, withstand angle impacts, and sustain 5-mile-per-hour (8 km/h) impacts with no damage. All the 1974 Matadors accomplished this with massive front and rear bumpers mounted on energy-absorbing shocks. The sedans and station wagons had them integrated with the bodywork using gap-concealing flexible filler panels.

The four-door sedans and wagons had increased overall vehicle length, along with new front and rear styling. A new front fascia, with a hood and grille, featured a prominent central protrusion that followed the shape of the front bumper. Matadors with this front end are sometimes nicknamed "coffin noses". The sedan's rear was redesigned, with the license plate relocated above the number to the center of the rear panel with new, wider rectangular taillights. The station wagon had redesigned tail lamps and a heavier, robust bumper with a central rubber facing. The two-door hardtop of the previous generation was replaced by an all-new fastback coupe for 1974, a wholly restyled model with no appearance similar to the new sedan or wagon.

The interior of all three body styles featured an all-new, fully padded and safety-shaped dashboard with three squared pods for housing the instruments in front of the driver (indicator lights, fuel gauge, and water temperature to the left, 120 mph (193 km/h) speedometer at the center, and an electric clock or fuel economy gauge on the right) as well as a new conventional-type horizontal radio/sound system design in the center of the dash. The traditional steering wheel horn pad used since the 1970 Rebel, was replaced with a rectangular "soft feel horn bar".

The base model sedans and wagons now included the 258 cu in (4.2 L) I6 engine with the three-speed Torque-Command automatic transmission. The 304 cu in (5.0 L) V8 was optional. A two-barrel or four-barrel 360 cu in (5.9 L) was optional as well as a 401 cu in (6.6 L) V8 with dual exhausts.

A road test by automobile journalist Vincent Courtenay of the 1974 Matador station wagon "praised its performance, handling, and fuel economy considering its size and 360 CID engine." He described it as "a real sleeper on the market. Its performance ranks it in the first line of cars, yet it's reasonably priced."

=== 1975 ===
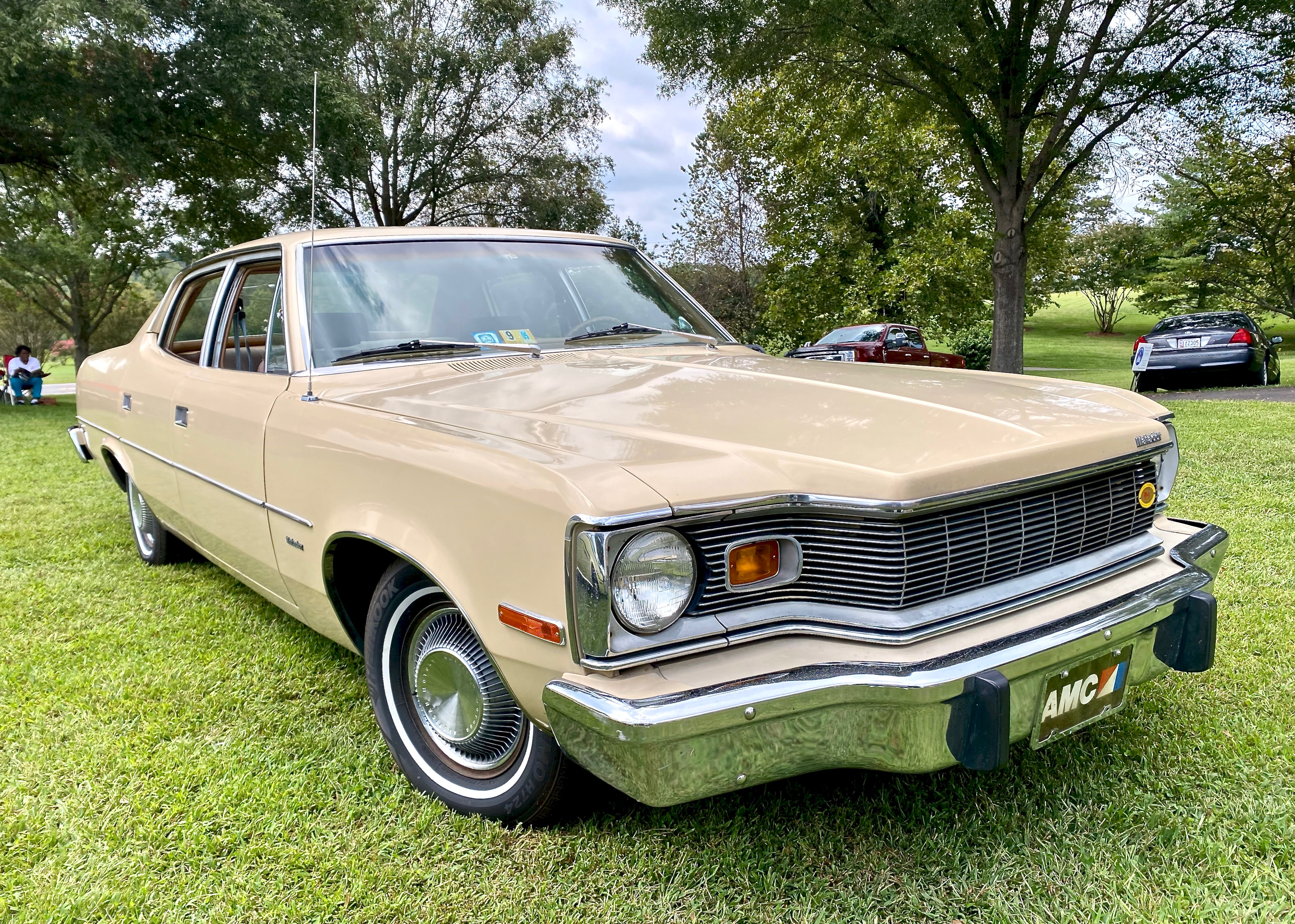
Second-generation Matador sedan with revised grille and turn signal lights

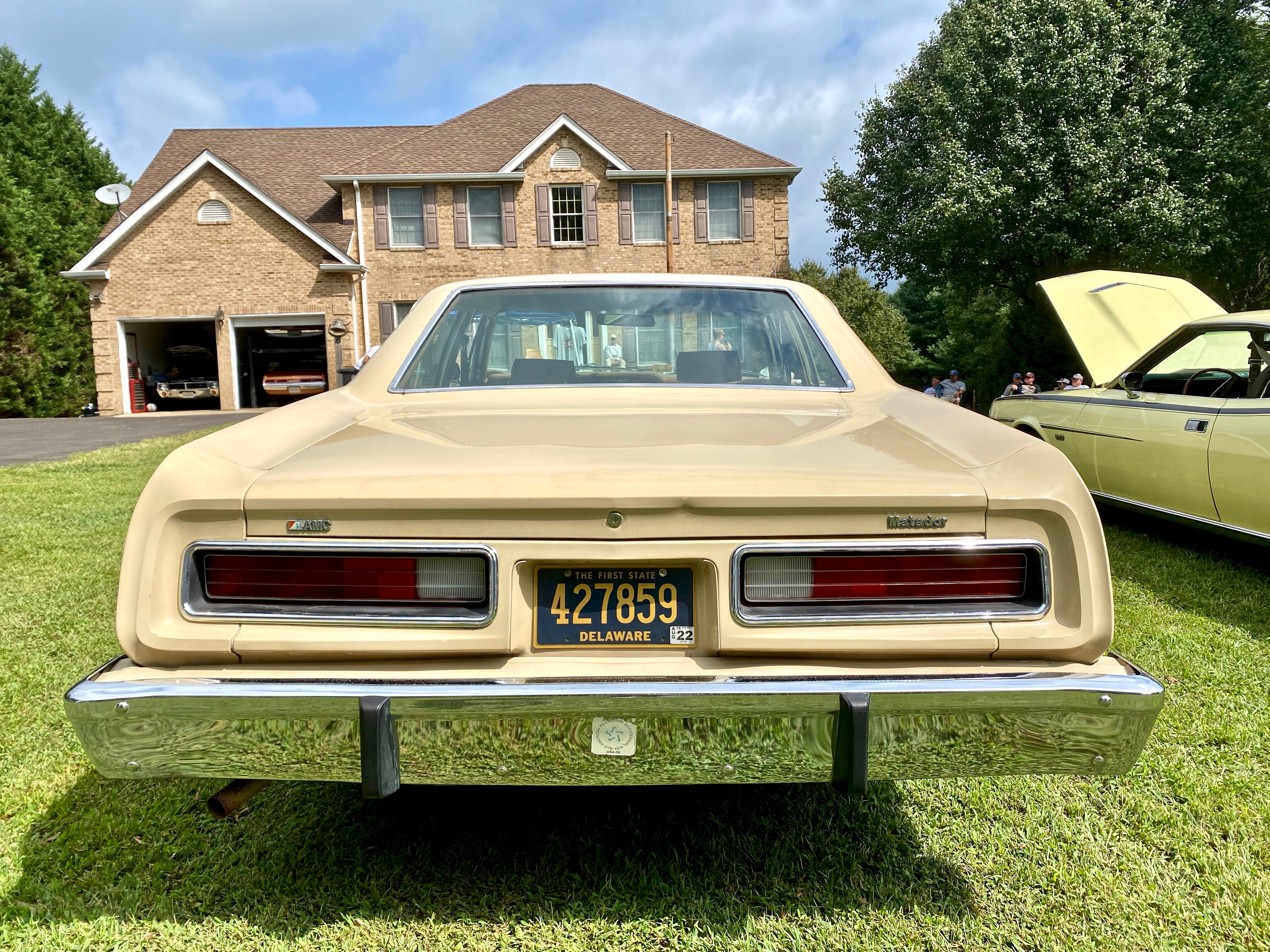
1975 AMC Matador with new-for-1975 tail lights, which remained unchanged until the end of production

Changes for the 1975 model year were minor as AMC focused on developing and introducing its innovative Pacer. Matadors now included a standard "no maintenance" electronic ignition developed by Prestolite. All U.S. market Matadors featured catalytic converters that required unleaded regular-grade fuel. New "unleaded fuel only" decals were placed next to the fuel filler door. A warning notice was added on the face of the fuel gauge, along with a restricted gas tank filler opening that allowed only the smaller pump nozzle that came on new pumps dispensing unleaded fuel. Steel-belted radial tires became standard equipment on all Matadors.

The six-cylinder engine now became the 258 cu in (4.2 L) version, but it was not available in California. The standard V8 was 304 cu in (5.0 L) and optional were two versions of the 360 cu in (5.9 L) with a two-barrel carburetor or a four-barrel with a dual exhaust system that AMC called "Power Package." The 401 cu in (6.6 L) V8 became a police and fleet only option. From 1975 the 360 and 401 V8s were fitted with the upgraded four-barrel Autolite 4300 carburetor. Only V8-powered Matadors were available in California.

The sedan and wagon exteriors were updated with a new full-width grille featuring squared-off parking lights at the front and taillight lens assemblies from the 1974 AMC Ambassador. An uplevel "Brougham" trim option became available for sedans and wagons starting with the 1975 model year. There were no further style changes to the body of the sedan and wagon for the remainder of the production run.

A preview of the 1975 Matador models by the editors of Consumer Guide was complimentary, especially of the sedan and wagon.

=== 1976 ===
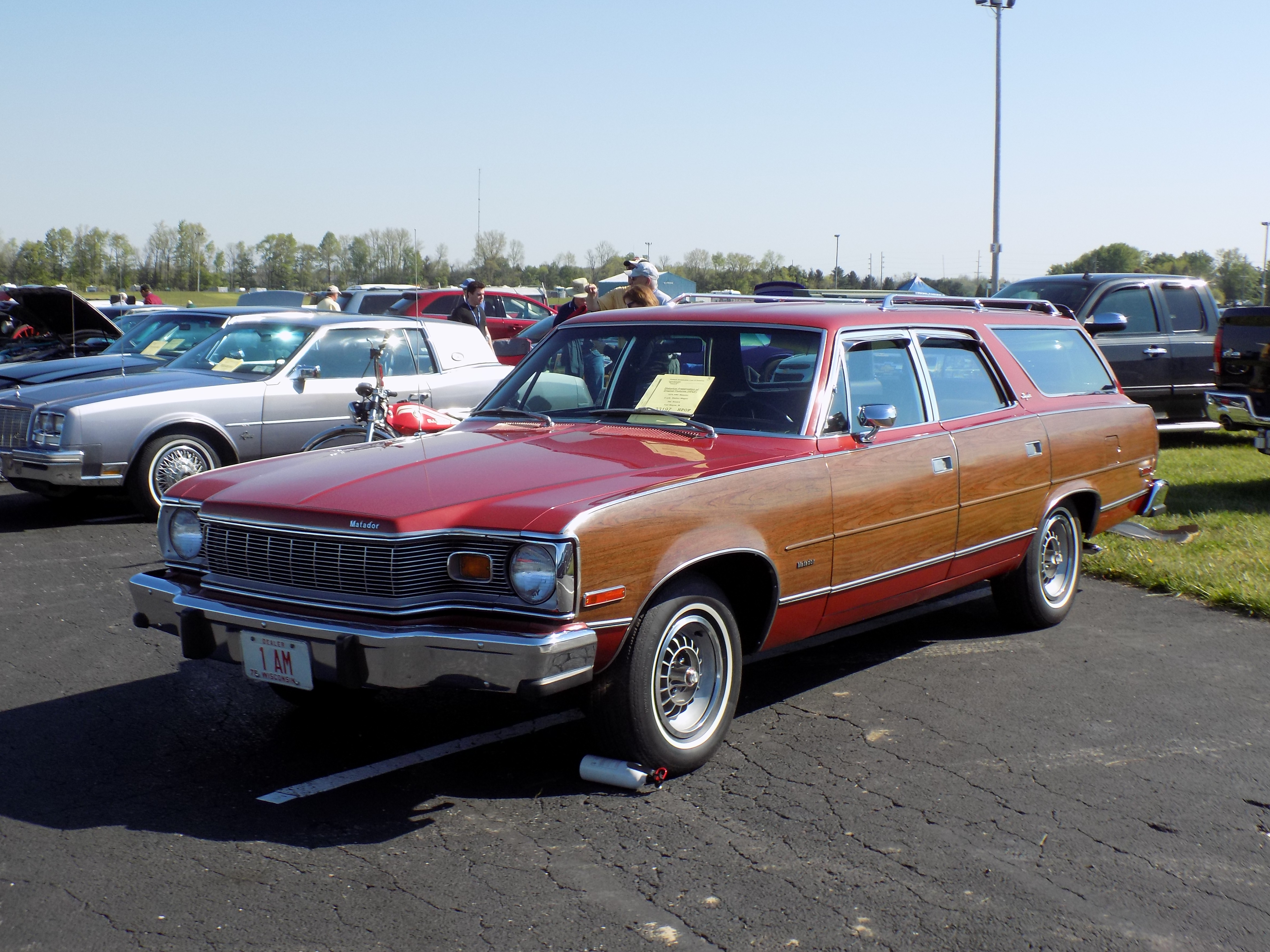
1976 AMC Matador station wagon with optional simulated wood trim

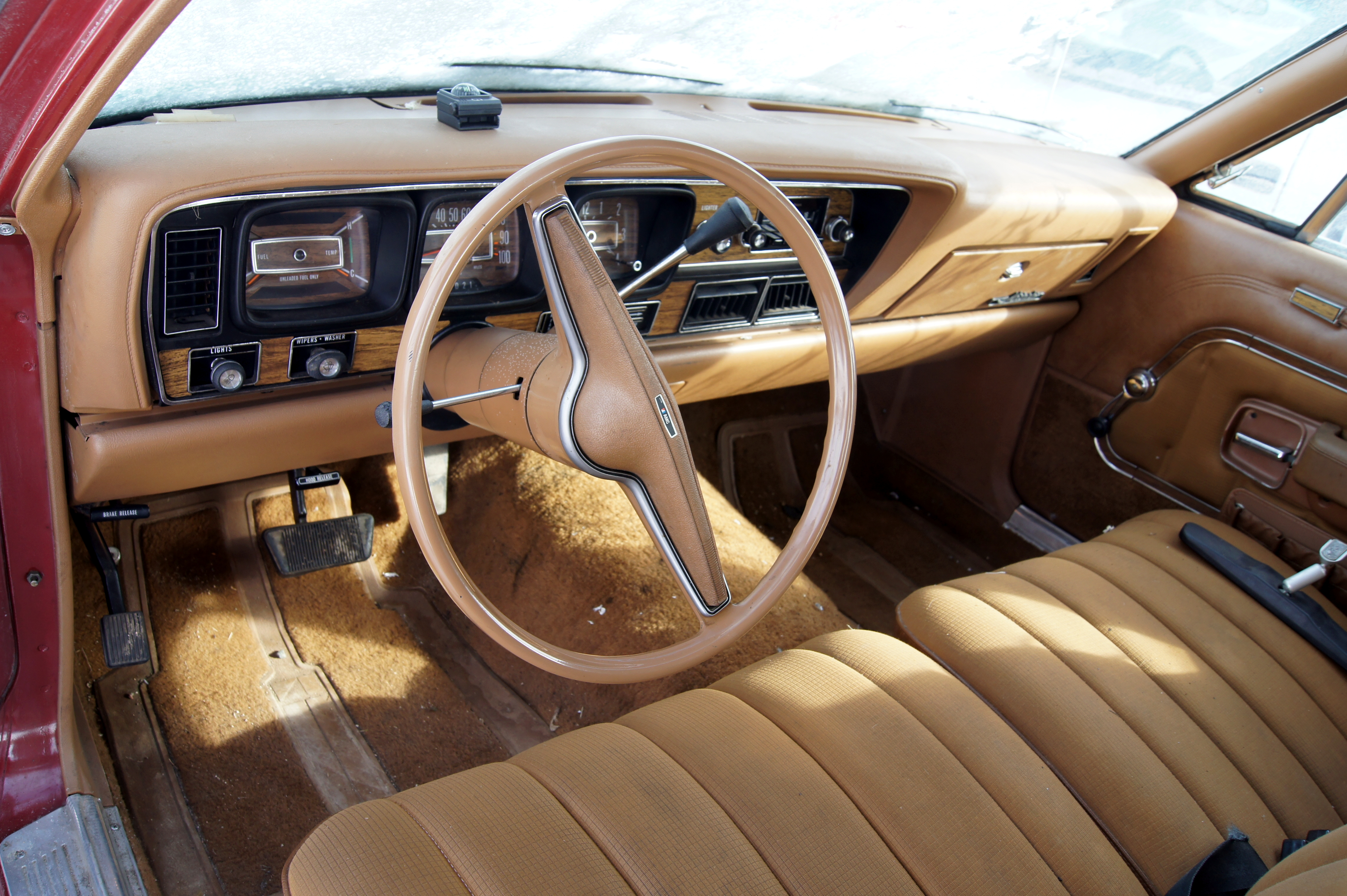
1976 AMC Matador with safety-shaped padded dashboard

For the 1976 model year, changes to the Matador sedan and station wagon were minimal. The only external upgrades were the addition of side bumper pads to the front and rear bumpers and replacing the park/turn signals and tail lights with serrated lenses. The paddle-style inside door handles were changed for 1976, along with new armrests used in other AMC vehicles. Otherwise, all interior features remained the same. The "Brougham" trim option continued for sedans and station wagons in 1976. Included were individually adjustable reclining front seats with custom "Hyde Park" fabric for the sedan or "Soft Touch" vinyl for the station wagon, woodgrain trim on the dashboard and door panels with assist straps, full-length bodyside scuff moldings, and other exterior trim.

The 258 cu in (4.2 L) six-cylinder with a manual transmission remained as the base drivetrain for the sedans. The 304 cu in (5.0 L) V8 with an automatic transmission was standard on station wagons (optional on the sedan). A popular upgrade was the 360 cu in (5.9 L) V8 with a two-barrel carburetor. A "Performance Option" 360 cu in (5.9 L) V8 with a four-barrel carburetor and a dual exhaust system that included twin catalytic converters was available through 1976. The 2.87 rear axle ratio was standard, with 3.15 and 3.54 optional. A floor-shifted automatic transmission was available only on coupes equipped with a V8 engine, bucket seats, and center console.

The fuel economy ratings with automatic transmission were:
16 mpg_{‑US} (15 L/100 km; 19 mpg_{‑imp}) city and 19 mpg_{‑US} (12 L/100 km; 23 mpg_{‑imp}) highway for the six-cylinder, which did not use a catalytic converter to meet emissions requirements. Cars with the I6 and manual transmission, as well as all V8 Matadors, included a catalytic converter.
13 mpg_{‑US} (18 L/100 km; 16 mpg_{‑imp}) city and 16 mpg_{‑US} (15 L/100 km; 19 mpg_{‑imp}) highway for the 304 cu in (5.0 L) V8 engine.
12 mpg_{‑US} (20 L/100 km; 14 mpg_{‑imp}) city and 16 mpg_{‑US} (15 L/100 km; 19 mpg_{‑imp}) highway for the 360 cu in (5.9 L) V8 two- and four-barrel versions.
These ratings were similar to those of the competitors such as the Dodge Coronet and Charger (fourth-generation) with 318 cu in (5.2 L) V8 engine with automatic transmission 11 mpg_{‑US} (21 L/100 km; 13 mpg_{‑imp}) city and 17 mpg_{‑US} (14 L/100 km; 20 mpg_{‑imp}) highway or the Mercury Montego (second-generation) with 400 cu in (6.6 L) two-barrel V8 engine with automatic transmission 13 mpg_{‑US} (18 L/100 km; 16 mpg_{‑imp}) city and 17 mpg_{‑US} (14 L/100 km; 20 mpg_{‑imp}) highway.

The U.S. automotive market underwent significant changes and industry adaptations. The "Big Three" domestic automakers still held 80% of the market while sales of foreign brands continued to expand. While the overall automobile market began recovering after the 1974 and 1975 slumps following the 1973 oil crisis, sales of the large Matador did not increase. The number four-ranked domestic automaker's share of the U.S. market dropped from 4.6% in 1975 to 2.8% in 1976 as consumer demand for small cars decreased. When new, the "Matadors were considered great cars," but AMC could not "really market the car against the other full-sizers" from the Big Three domestic automakers. Toward the end of the model year, AMC offered price cuts and rebates to buyers. A problem with emissions controls required a recall of almost all non-California Matadors, "which cost AMC more than $5 million and contributed to a net loss of $46.3 million for the fiscal year."

=== 1977 ===
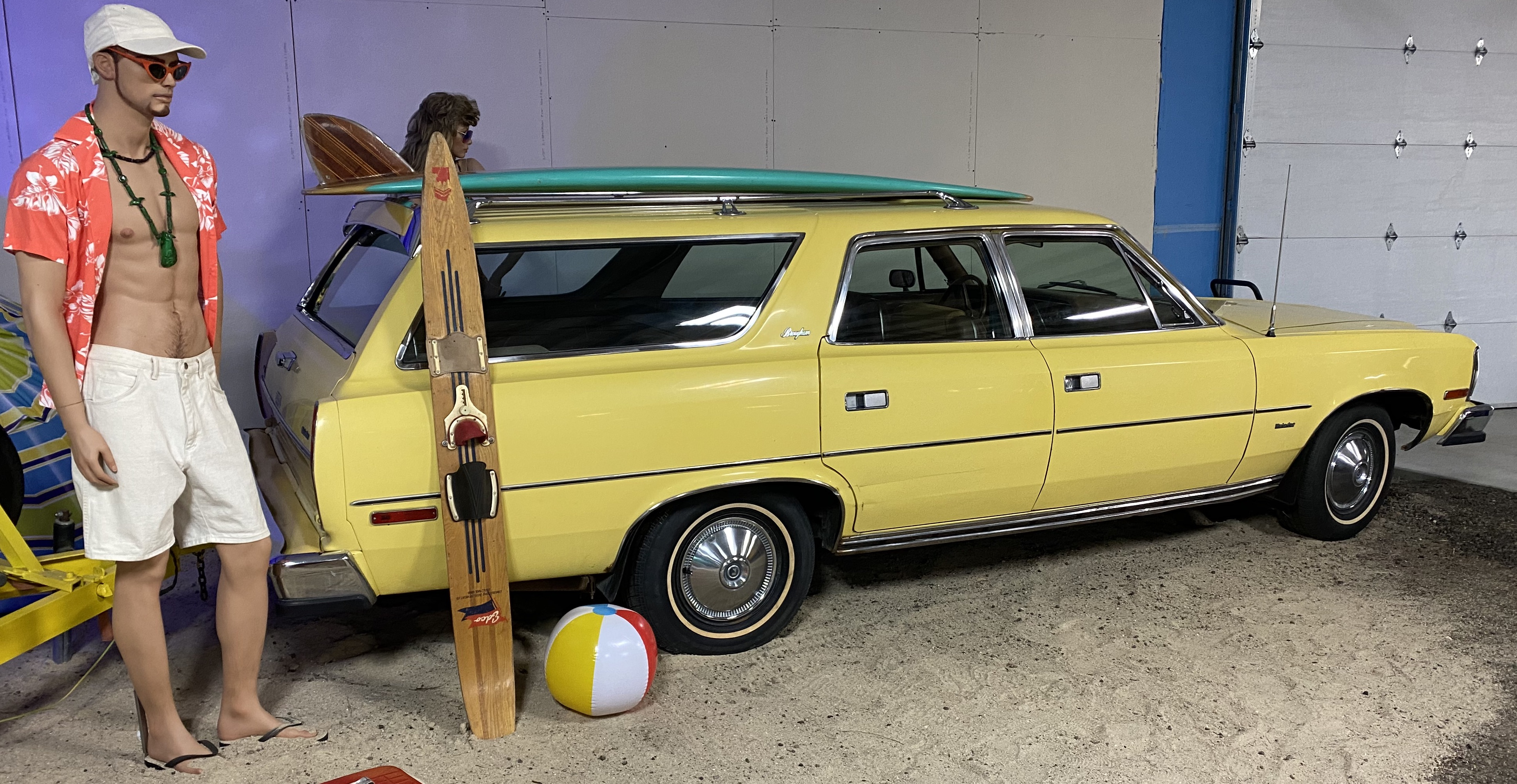
Matador station wagon

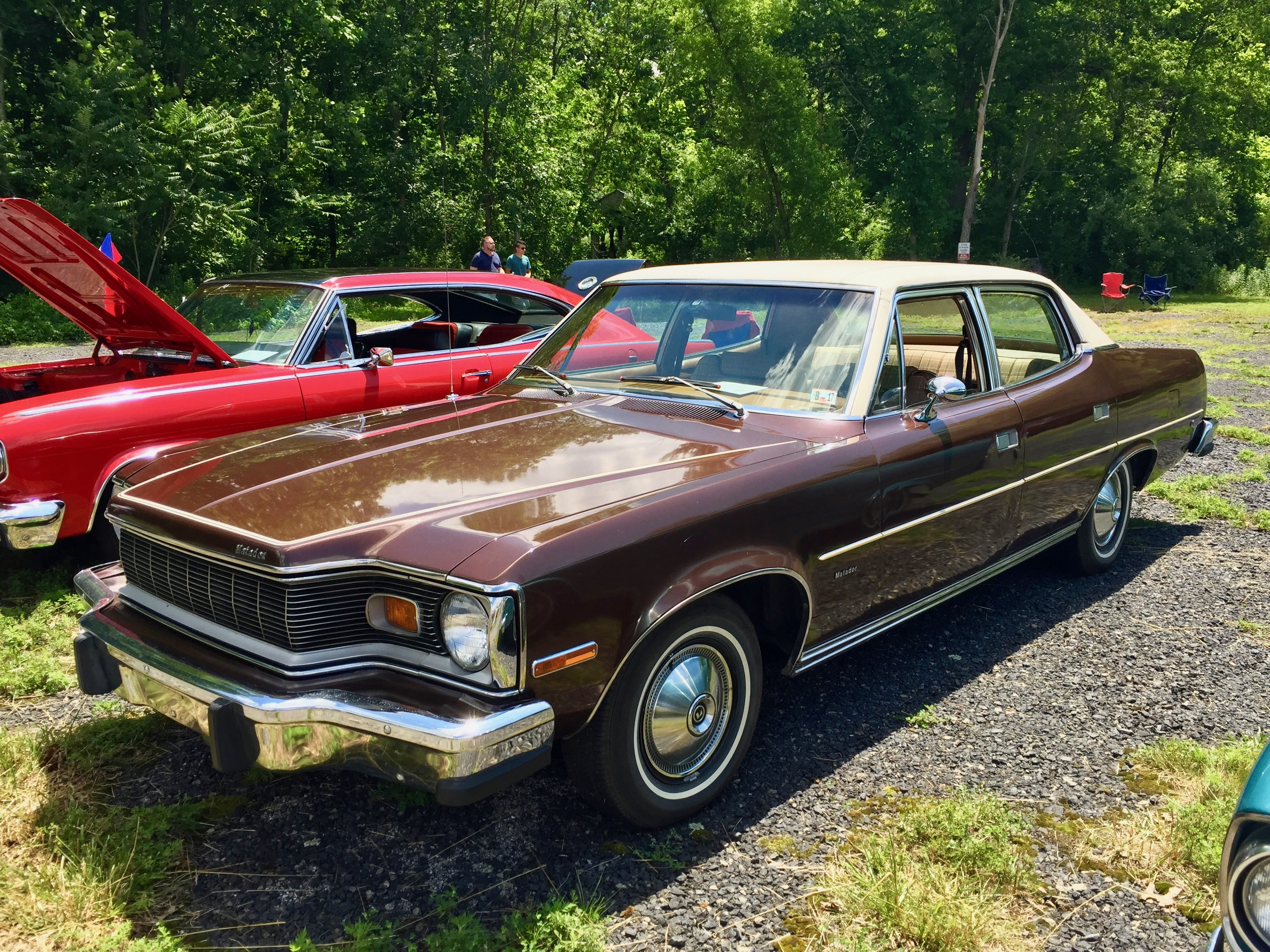
1977 AMC Matador sedan in Mocha Brown with white roof

All 1977 Matadors included enhanced comfort, trim, and convenience equipment as factory standard. Among them were automatic transmission, power steering, power disc brakes, full wheel covers, as well as individually adjustable and reclining front seats. Standard were fully color-coordinated interiors with plaid-patterned fabrics or full vinyl upholstery. Plush carpet was also in the cargo area of station wagons that featured chrome strips on the load floor to ease loading items.

For the 1977 model year, AMC introduced the "Buyer Protection Plan II", which extended the engine and drivetrain warranty from the previous twelve months or 12,000 miles (19,312 km) limits to cover 24 months or 24,000 miles (38,624 km).

The base engines continued to be the 258 cu in (4.2 L) I6 and the 304 cu in (5.0 L) V8, with the 360 cu in (5.9 L) optional. The high-performance "Power Package" 360 was discontinued for 1977.

The domestic automakers had begun the process of downsizing their models in response to changing market demands, but AMC continued its body design with the result that the six-cylinder Matador now weighed 168 lb (76 kg) more - along with having less interior room - than a new large-sized six-cylinder Pontiac.

=== 1978 ===
Matador sedans and station wagons came in the Brougham trim level, but now without any exterior identification. All models came with the Barcelona hood ornament, first introduced on the 1977 "Barcelona" Matador Coupe.

For 1978, the 258 cu in (4.2 L) I6 remained the standard engine in the sedan and coupe, with the 360 cu in (5.9 L) being the only available V8. All station wagons included the 360 cu in (5.9 L) V8. Power output was increased with the I6 now rated at 120 hp (89 kW; 122 PS), and the V8 returned to 140 hp (104 kW; 142 PS), as it was during 1975 and 1976. The V8's torque was increased to 278 lb⋅ft (377 N⋅m) at 2,000 rpm from 245 lb⋅ft (332 N⋅m) at 1,600 rpm in 1977. The engines featured electronic ignition. A column-mounted automatic transmission was standard on all Matadors, with coupes available with bucket seats and a center console-mounted automatic shifter. Power steering and power front disc brakes continued to be standard.

Interiors featured individual reclining seats in the front upholstered in velveteen crush fabric on coupes and sedans, while station wagons included "crush vinyl grain" in two- or three-row versions. Matadors were available in thirteen exterior colors. Station wagons were available with simulated wood grain trim on body sides, tailgate, and the rear air deflector. Full vinyl-covered roofs were optional on sedans and coupes. Audio selections included an AM radio, rear speaker, AM/FM stereo with four speakers, AM/FM/eight-track tape player with four speakers, AM/CB radio, and an AM/FM stereo/CB with four speakers.

The AMC Buyer Protection Plan for 1978 reverted to 12 months or 12,000 miles (19,312 km) coverage across the entire AMC range.

In 1978, sales of the Matador fell by two-thirds, and AMC discontinued the line by the end of the model year.

1978 AMC Matador

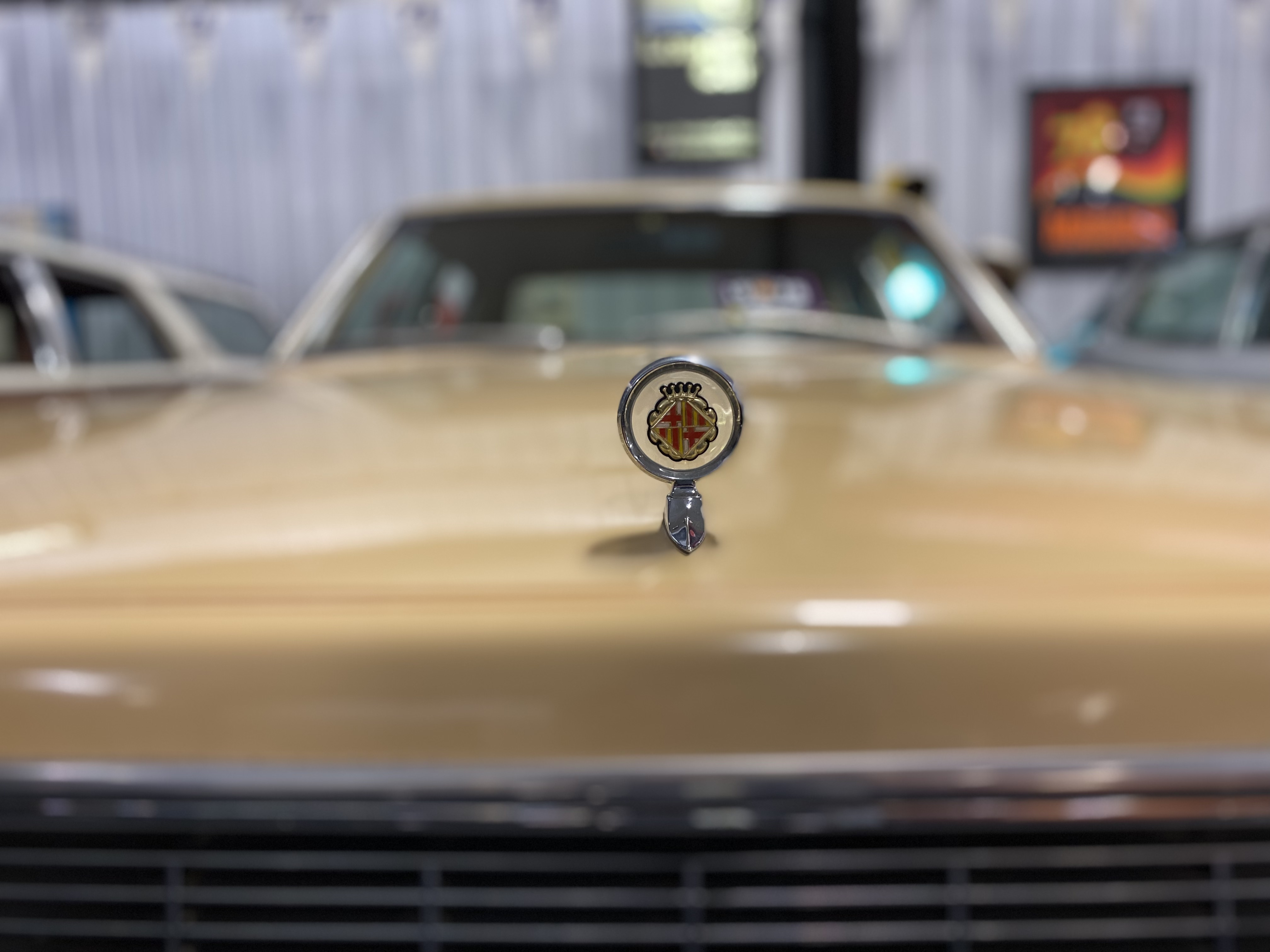
"Barcelona" hood ornament, standard on all 1978 models

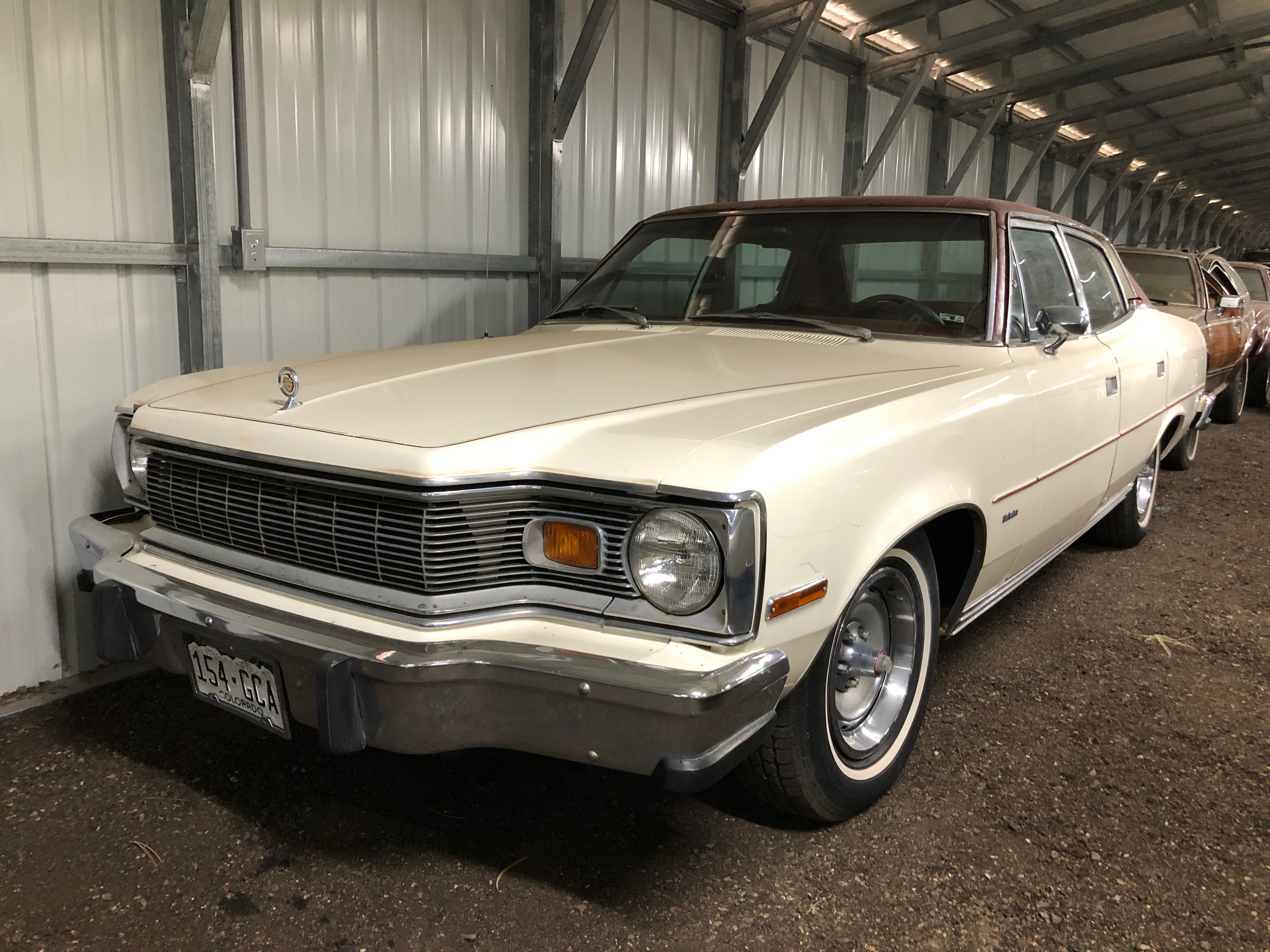
1978 Matador sedan, white with vinyl roof

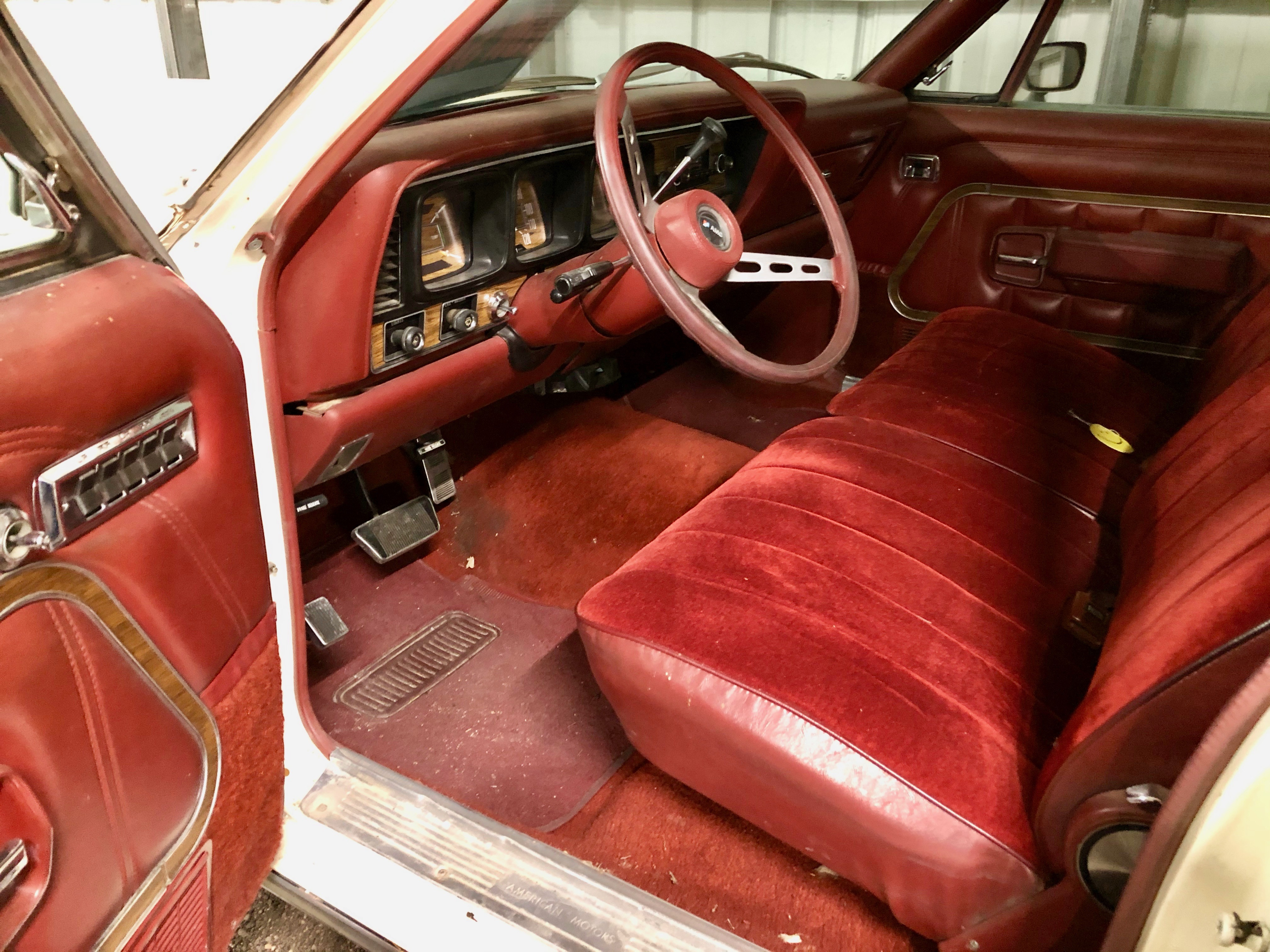
978 Matador sedan, white with red interior and optional sport steering wheel

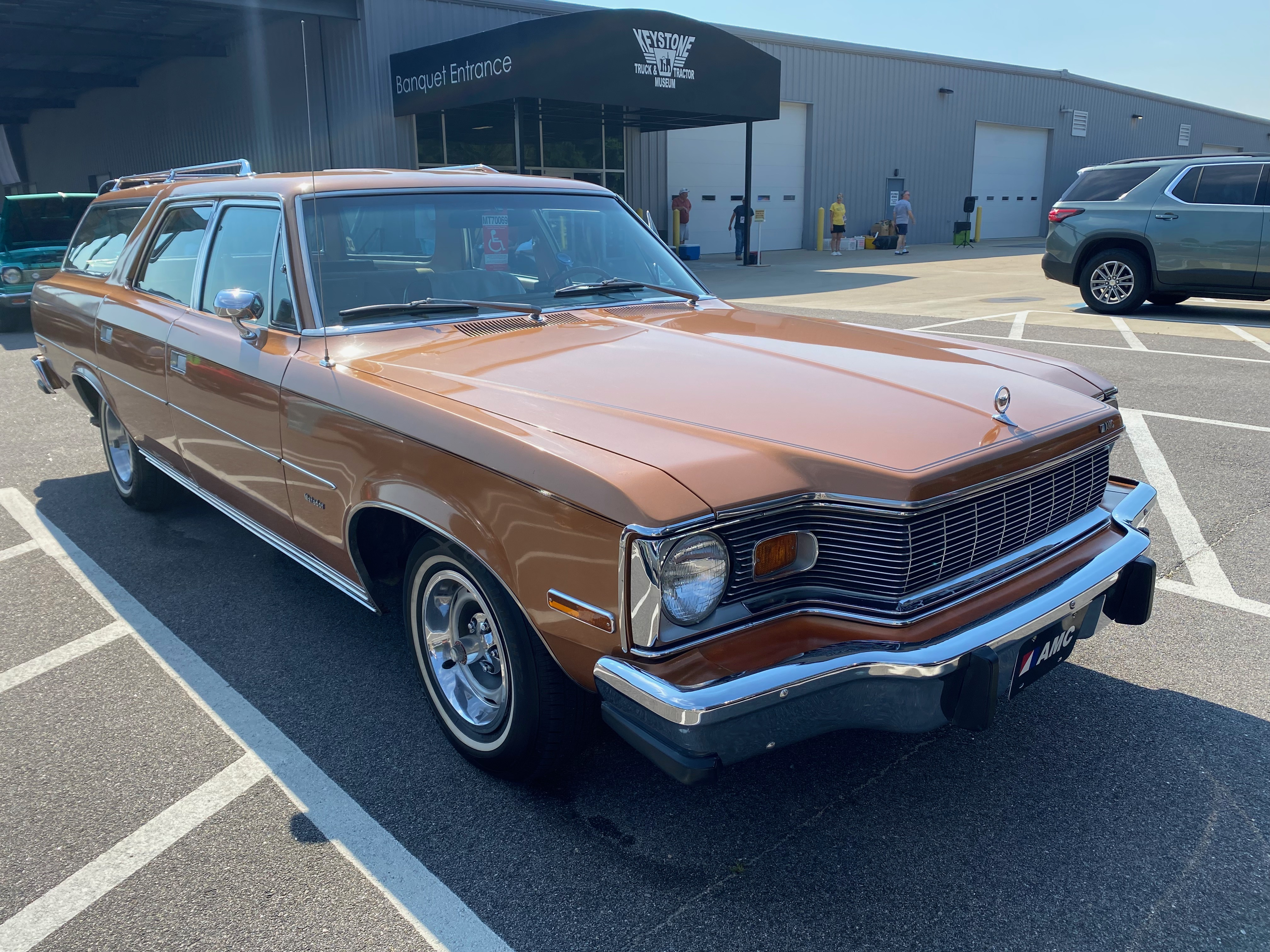
1978 AMC Matador station wagon in Golden Ginger

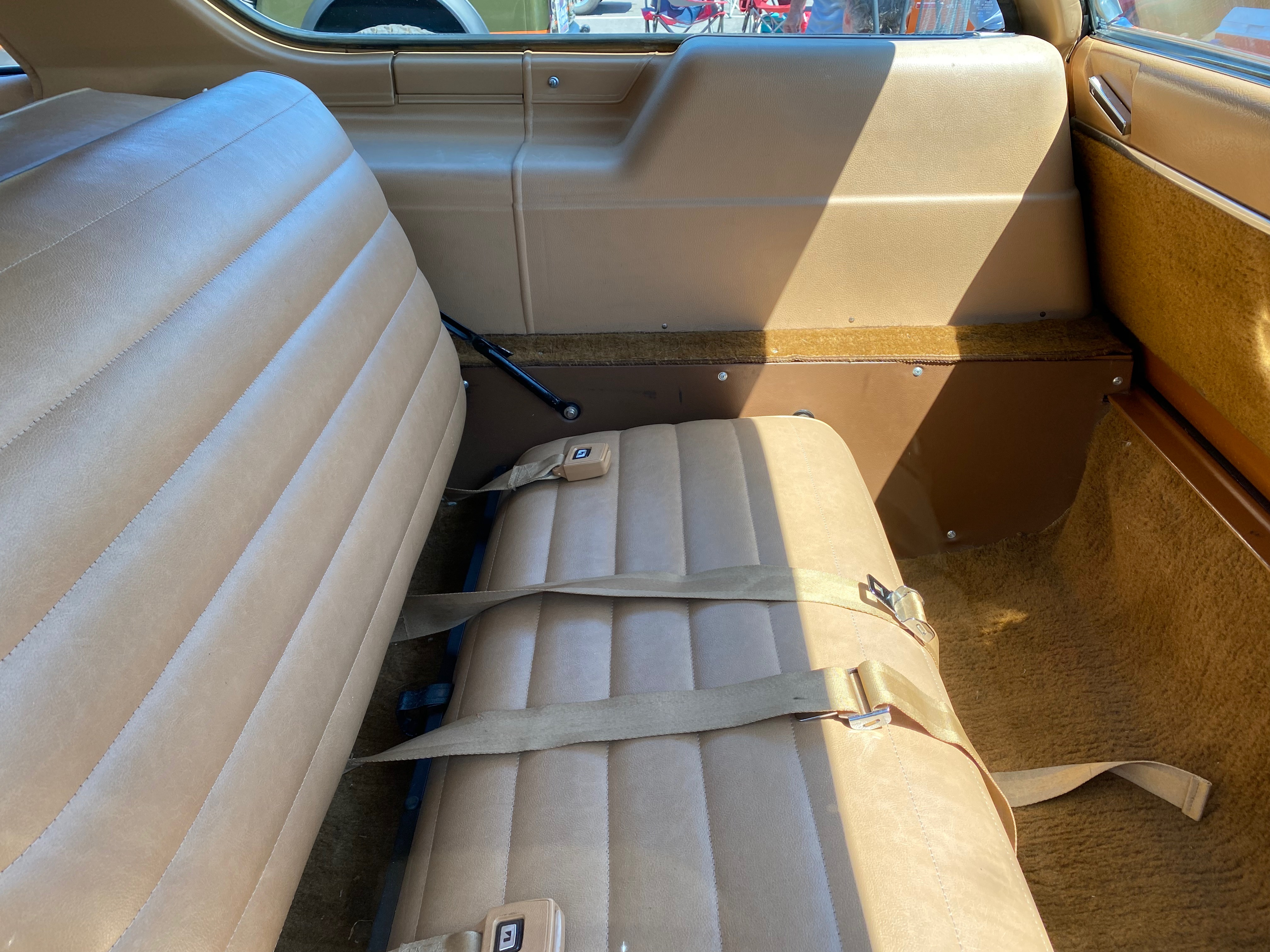
Third row, rear-facing seats for two passengers in 1978 AMC Matador station wagon

==== Barcelona sedan ====
The 1978 model year saw the "Barcelona" option, which debuted on the 1977 Matador Coupe, extended to the four-door sedan. This special trim package included velveteen crush fabric upholstery on the individually reclining front seats, vinyl roof, and coordination of colors both inside and outside. The Barcelona sedan came in a choice of two two-tone color schemes: Golden Ginger Metallic on Sand Tan with a tan interior, or Autumn Red metallic on Claret metallic with a claret interior. Additional features included woven accent stripes on the seats as well as on custom door trim panels, a unique headliner, 24 oz (680 g) carpeting, dual color-matched remotely adjustable rearview mirrors, 15-inch slot-styled steel road wheels color-matched to the two exterior color schemes, GR78x15 whitewall tires, and black trunk carpeting.

1978 AMC Matador Barcelona sedan

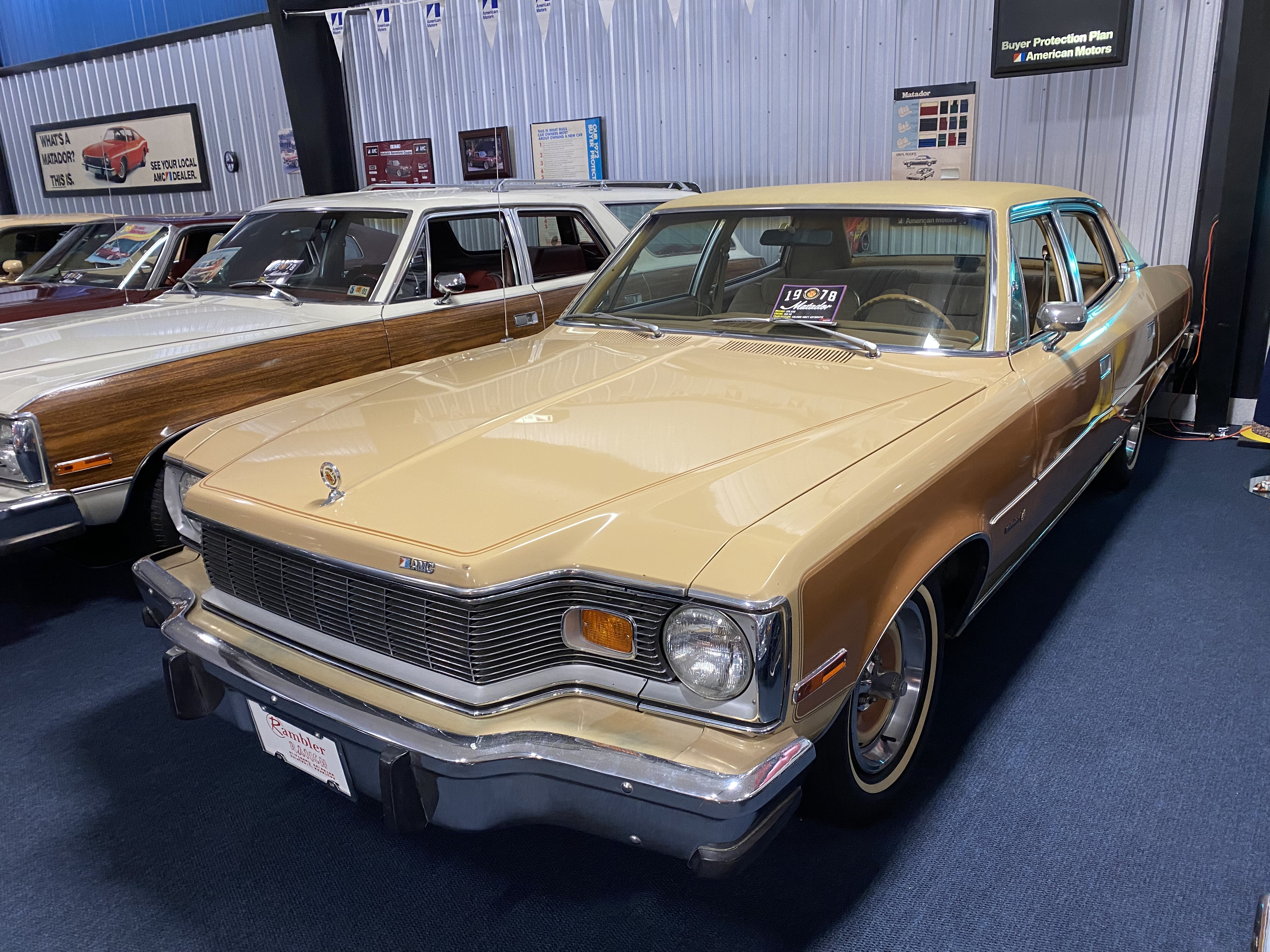
Barcelona in Sand Tan and Golden Ginger

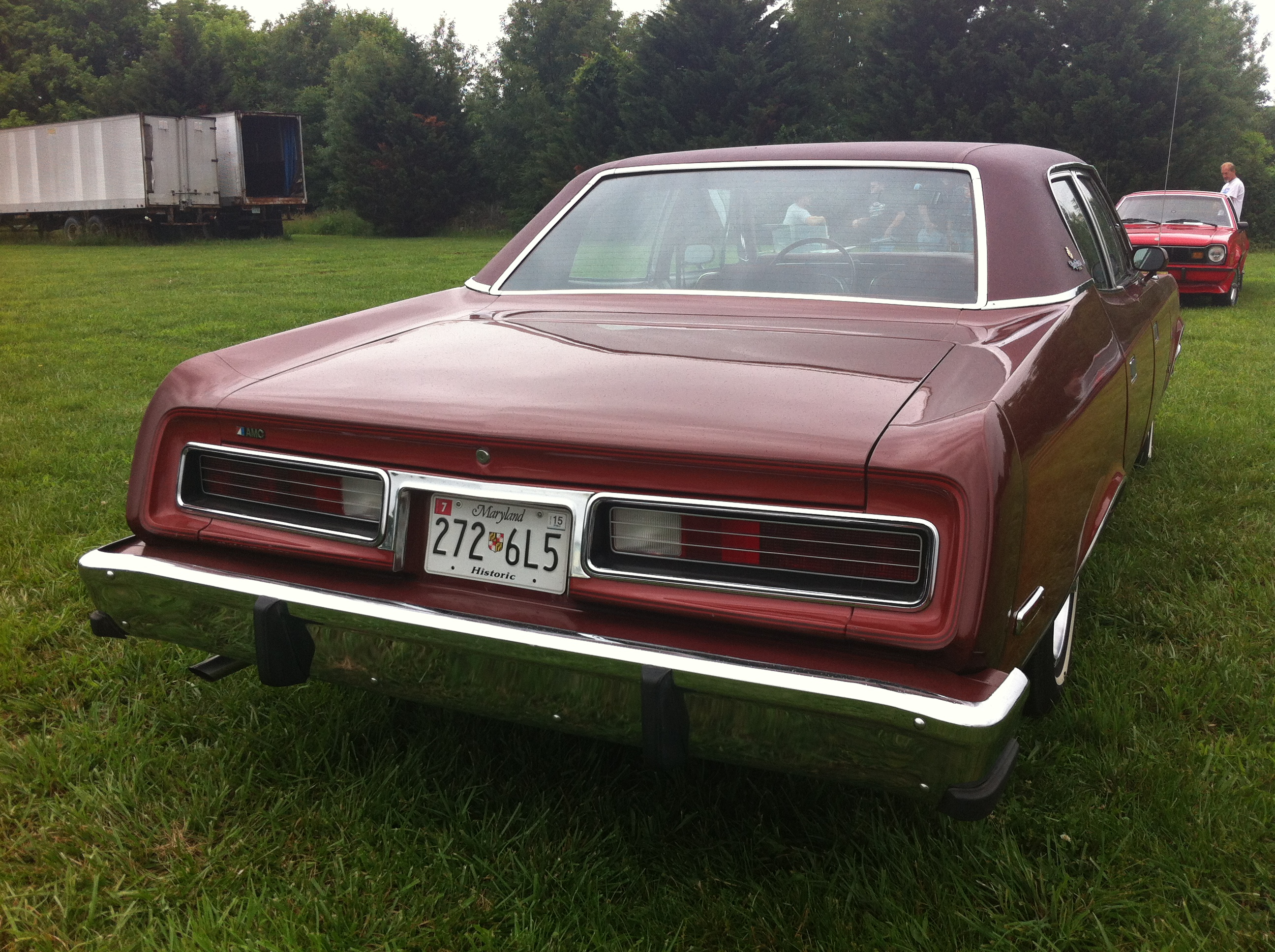
Barcelona in Claret with Autumn Red

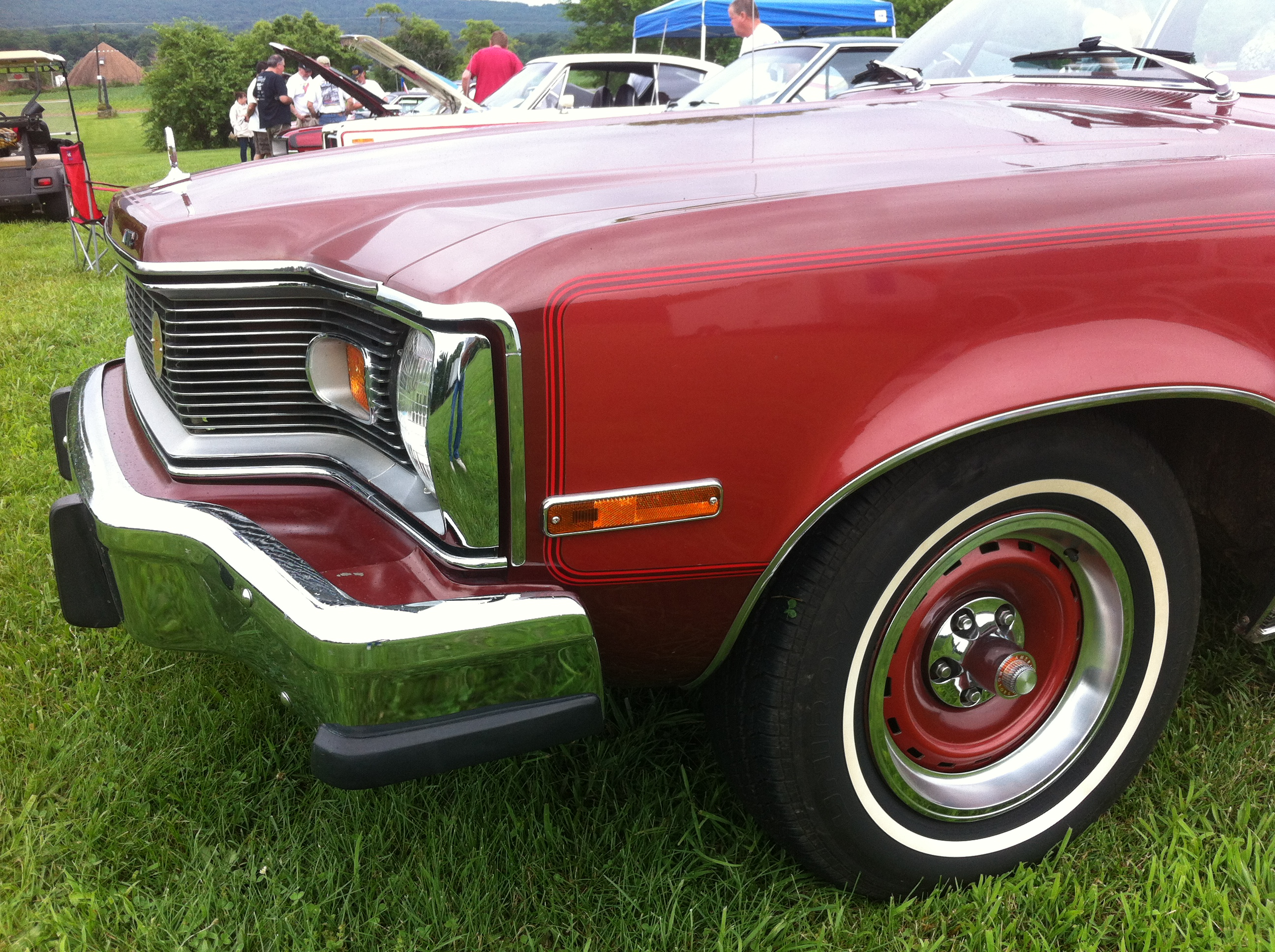
Two-tone and Barcelona 15-inch wheels

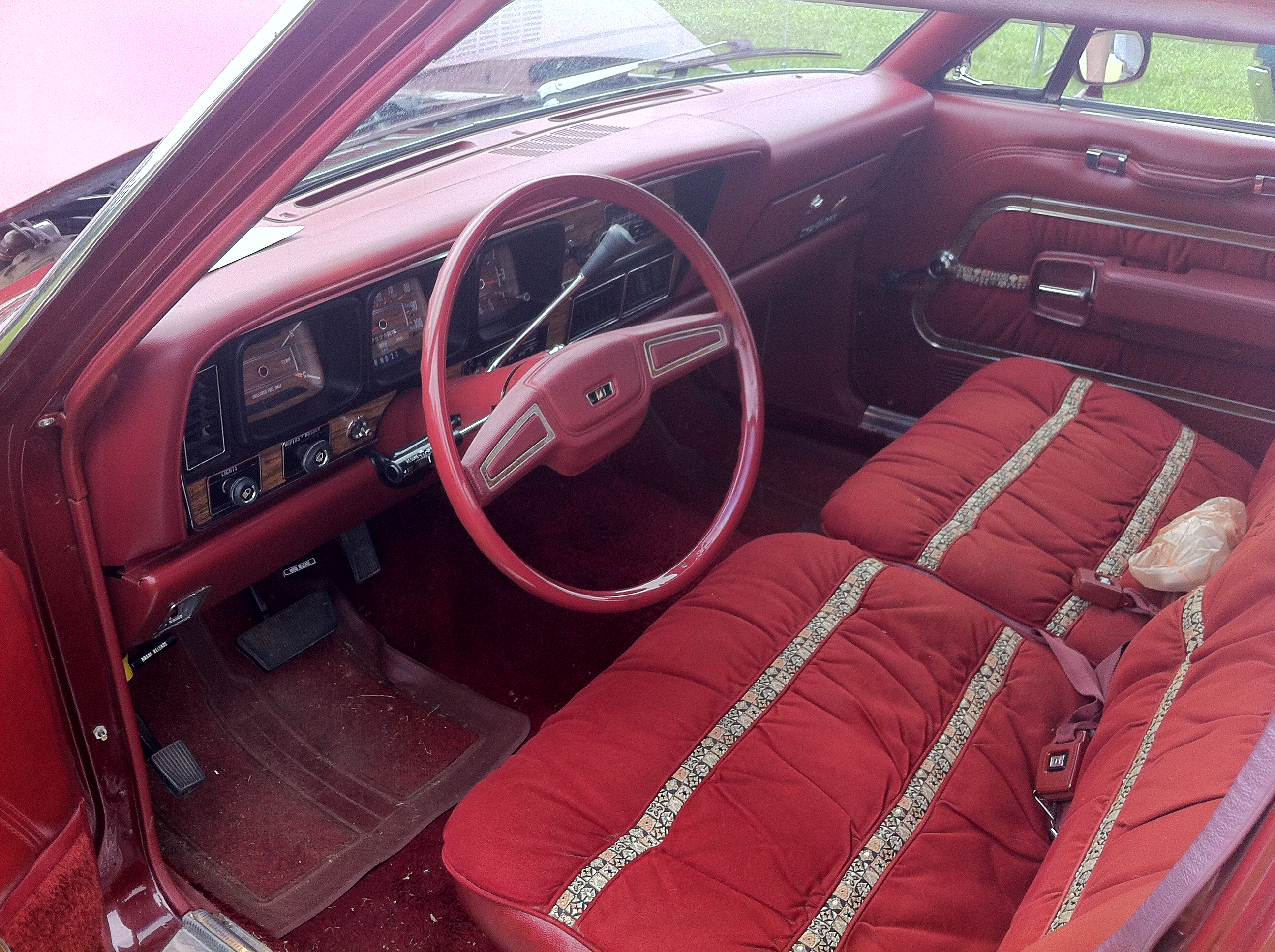
Interior special upholstery

=== Matador Coupe ===
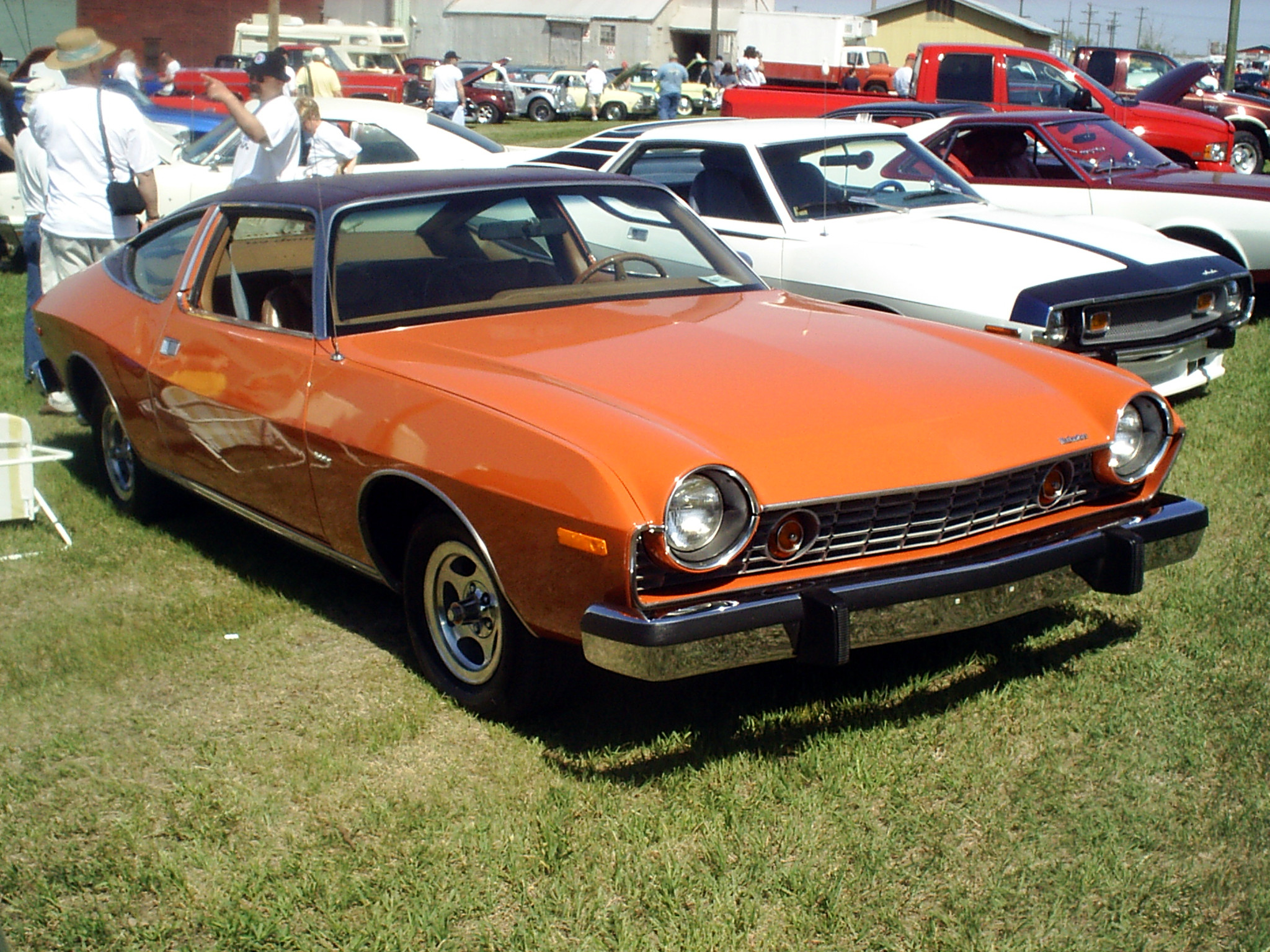
1975 Matador coupe

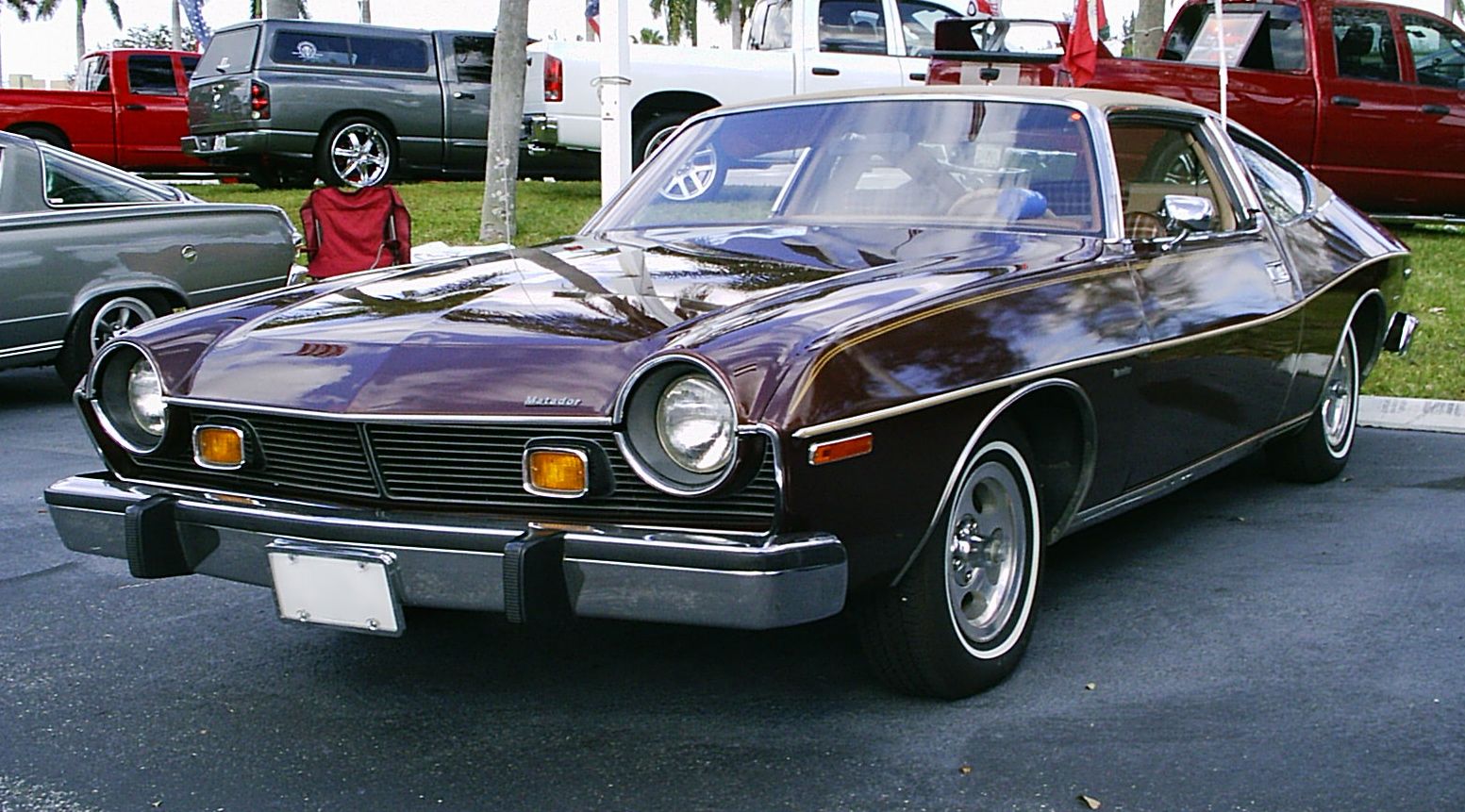
1976 AMC Matador Coupe, Brougham edition finished in Dark Cocoa Metallic with optional vinyl roof cover

American Motors executives saw an opportunity to replace the "uninspired" Matador two-door hardtop with a new design to capture people looking for exciting, sporty styling in a market segment outpacing the rest of the automobile market. Marketers also wanted a model to answer the demand for plush mid-size coupes after the end of the muscle car era.

The 1974 model year introduced an aerodynamically styled fastback coupe with pronounced "tunneled" headlight surrounds. The Matador coupe was the only all-new model in the popular mid-size car segment, explicitly targeting the Chevrolet Chevelle Coupe, Ford Torino Coupe, and Plymouth Satellite Sebring. The coupe was designed under the direction of AMC's vice president of styling, Dick Teague, with input from Mark Donohue, the famous race car driver. AMC's styling department had greater freedom because of a decision to design the new Matador strictly as a coupe, without the constraints of attempting to have the sedan and station wagon versions fit the same body lines.

Teague reportedly designed the coupe's front as an homage to one of the first AMCs he designed, the 1964 Rambler American. This was one of several distinctive elements as the long sloping hood was set off by deeply tunneled headlamps between a broad grille with turn signal lamps resembling driving lamps. The forward edge of the hood was part of a character crease line that went entirely around the middle of the car and continued across the rear end. The coupe's doors were extra long and featured frameless glass. The B-pillar was also distinctive, and the quarter side windows sloped with the roofline. Combining a long, low hood and a tall, short rear deck enhanced the coupe's wind-shaped look. The new coupe featured a unique design to avoid the massive, blockish look. The bodywork flowed underneath the coupe's broad grille with tunneled headlamps in the rear with an uninterrupted design with the four round taillamps and an indented license plate area, while the bumpers were free-standing with rubber gaiters concealing the retractable shock absorbers.

The standard power team for the 1974 coupe was AMC's 232 cu in (3.8 L) I6 with a three-speed manual transmission. A floor shift automatic transmission was available with a center console and bucket front seats.

Industry observers were "amazed" that AMC developed the fast, stylish Matador, considering the automaker's size and limited resources. The Matador coupe was named "Best Styled Car of 1974" by the editors of Car and Driver magazine. A Popular Mechanics survey indicated "luscious looks of Matador coupe swept most owners off their feet" with a "specific like" listed by 63.7% of them for "styling".

Sales of the coupe were brisk, with 62,629 Matador coupes delivered for its introductory year (August 1973 through December 1974, Long Year), up sharply from the 7,067 Matador hardtops sold in 1973. This is a respectable record that went against the drop in the overall market during 1974 and the decline in popularity of intermediate-sized coupes after the 1973 oil crisis.

The 1974 coupe was also a milestone car for American Motors by being the six millionth automobile built by AMC since its formation from the merger of Nash and Hudson in 1954.

A new grille for the coupe was introduced for the 1976 model year. Two rectangular panels with horizontal grille bars met in the center, and rectangular park and turn signal lamps replaced the previous round ones.

After the coupe outsold the four-door Matadors by nearly 25,000 units in 1974, sales dropped to less than 10,000 in 1977, then down to 2,006 in the final year. Nearly 100,000 Matador coupes were produced from 1974 through 1978. The coupe stands out as one of the more distinctive and controversial designs of the 1970s after the AMC Pacer.

American Motors executives, including vice president of design Dick Teague, described design plans for a four-door sedan and station wagon based on the coupe's styling themes that did not reach production.

==== Matador D/L ====
A special-edition D/L coupe was a limited promotion trim package for Spring. Designed to capitalize on the popularity of the formal or "opera" style rear quarter window, which was also used for the NASCAR race cars. The D/L Promotion Package built on the Matador Brougham two-door and included the opera window, a padded vinyl roof (in black, brown, white, buff, or green) the 360 cu in (5.9 L) V8 engine, automatic transmission, power steering, power disk brakes, AM/FM sterio radio, air conditioning, tinted glass all around, visibility group, light group, spoke-style road wheels, individual reclining front seats, and FR78x14 whitewall radial tires. No option additions or deletions were permitted. Pricing of Matador Brougham with the D/L package was also specially discounted for the dealer, and with savings for the buyers, with an MSRP of $4,995.

==== Matador X ====
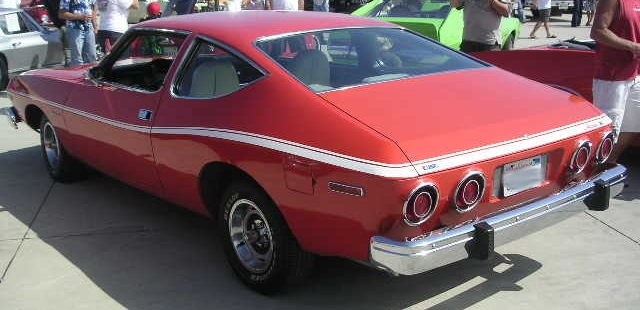
1974 AMC Matador X Coupe

A sportier appearance version model, called the "Matador X," included body-side striping that wrapped around the rear, as well as the 304 cu in (5.0 L) V8. The model was priced at $3,699 and marketed for only one year, with total sales reaching 10,074 in 1974.

The following year, an "X package" was available for $199.

==== Oleg Cassini ====
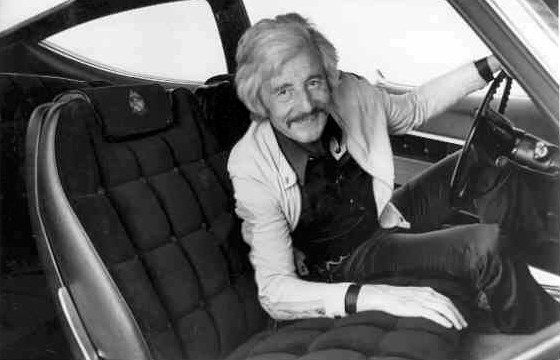
Cassini showing off the interior trim he designed

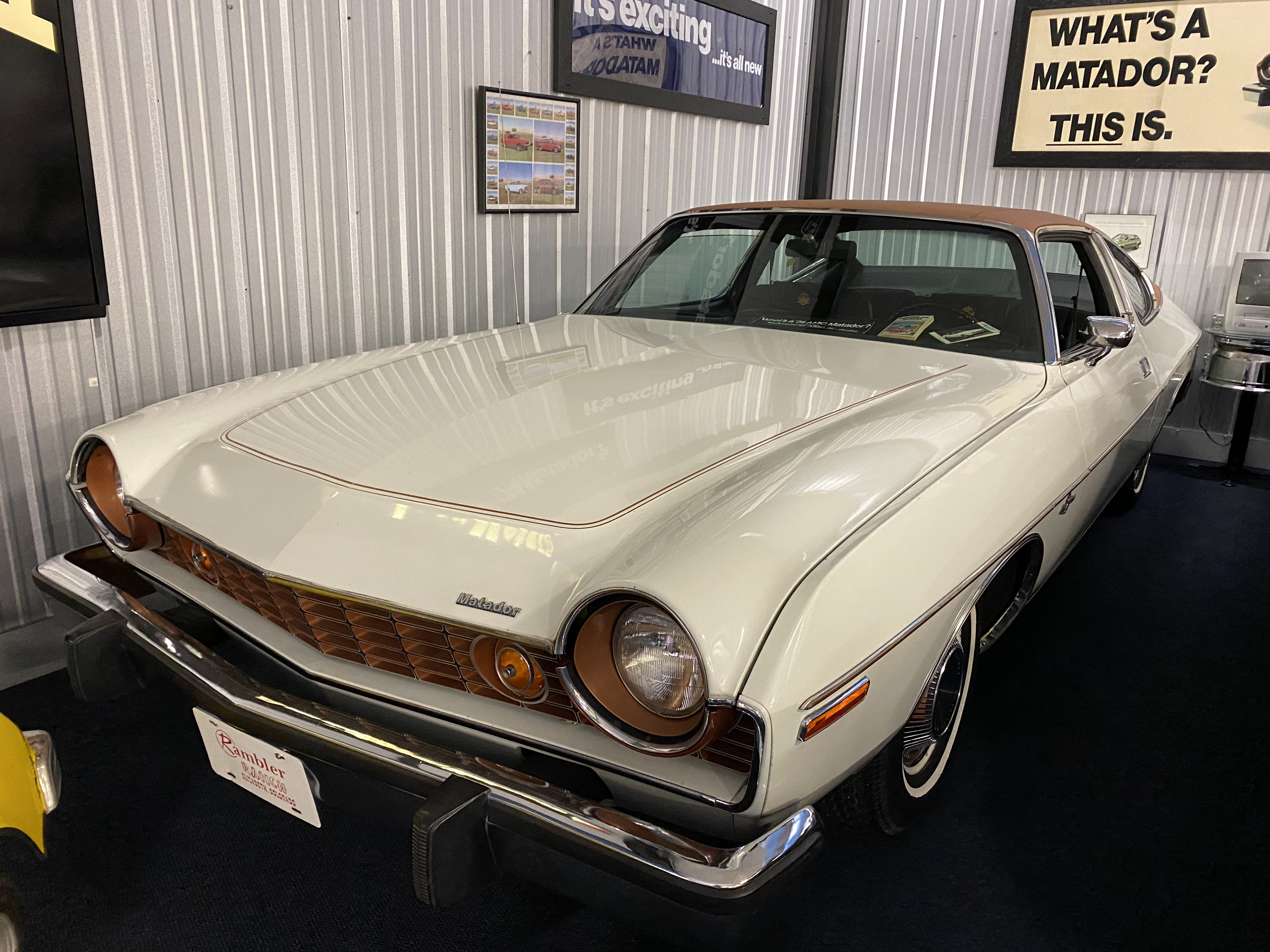
1974 Matador Oleg Cassini coupe

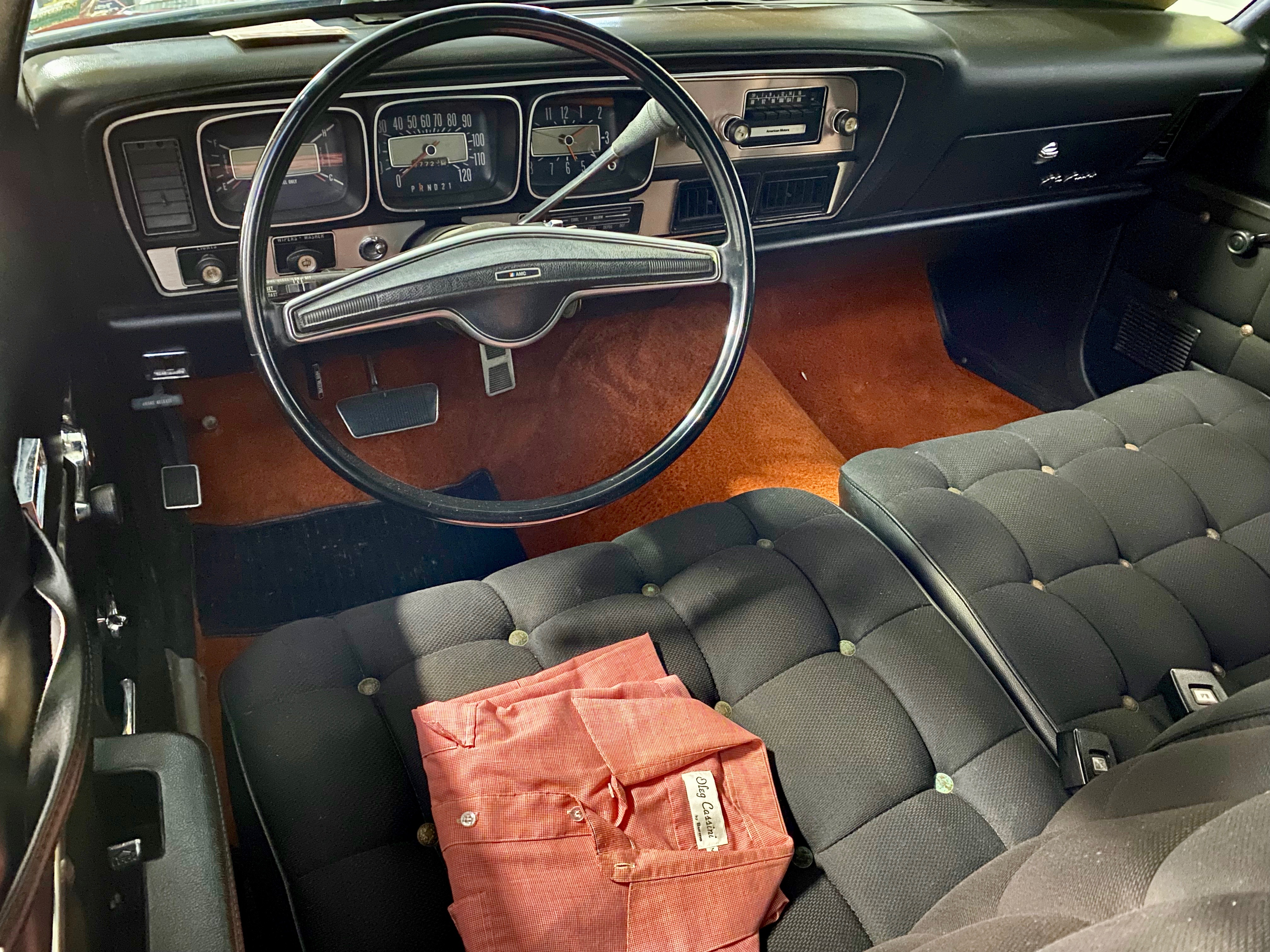
1975 Matador Oleg Cassini interior with a shirt by the fashion designer on the driver's seat

A special Oleg Cassini edition of the Matador coupe was available for the 1974 and 1975 model years. It was positioned in the mid-sized personal luxury car market segment that was highly popular during the mid-1970s. The Cassini Matador was the latest in a series of designer cars marketed by AMC from a program launched in 1971 when AMC signed contracts with selected top names in the fashion world. The Cassini model followed the Gucci Hornet and Pierre Cardin Javelin unique designs, as well as the Levi's package of the Gremlin and Hornet. American Motors had the famous American fashion designer develop an elegant, luxury-oriented haute couture design for the all-new Matador coupe.

Cassini was renowned in Hollywood and high society for making elegant ready-to-wear dresses, including those worn by Jacqueline Kennedy. According to Dick Teague, the automaker's vice president of styling, AMC wanted to target mid-size car buyers aged 25 to 35 and marketing studies showed that Cassini was a "fashion authority whose name was familiar in America" as his name was at the top of consumer recognition lists. Cassini helped promote the car in AMC's advertising.

This was also the first time in AMC's designer models where the fashion expert influenced both the interior and exterior details with the objective "for the entire car to emphasize a carefully wrought harmony of colors, trim, and fabrics". With Cassini's styling, the new "smooth and slippery" two-door featured "marks of haute couture" with the "upholstery, panels and headliner done in jet black, with copper trim pieces, and with carpets and vinyl roof also offered in a copper accent color. The exterior trim included striping, bodyside rub strips, custom wheel covers, and special "Oleg Cassini" crest badging. The Cassini coupes were limited to black, white, or copper metallic exterior paints, and all came with the vinyl-covered roof. They also featured copper-colored trim in the grille, headlamp bezels, within the standard turbine-type full wheel covers, and also within the rear license plate recess.

The interior was a Cassini hallmark, featuring a unique black fabric with copper buttons on the individual, adjustable, and reclining front seats, as well as on the padded door panels. The appearance was enhanced by deep-pile copper-colored carpeting. Additional copper accents were on the steering wheel, door pulls, and instrument panel. Embroidered Cassini medallions adorned the headrests. The glove compartment door, trunk lid, front fender, and hood featured Cassini's signature.

The Cassini version generated publicity along with showroom traffic for AMC dealers. A total of 6,165 Cassinis were built during the 1974 model year, with another 1,817 versions for 1975. Changes for 1975 were minimal, such as using AMC's new standard steering wheel design with a softer cover and tapered spokes. The Cassini luxury designer model was supplanted for the 1976 model year with the "Barcelona" version designed by AMC's in-house staff. This new model took the Matador to a whole other level of being a "mini-Mark IV, but with none of the prestige."

The use of a fashion designer to specially create appearance packages for American cars was followed by the Continental Mark IV in 1976.

==== Barcelona ====
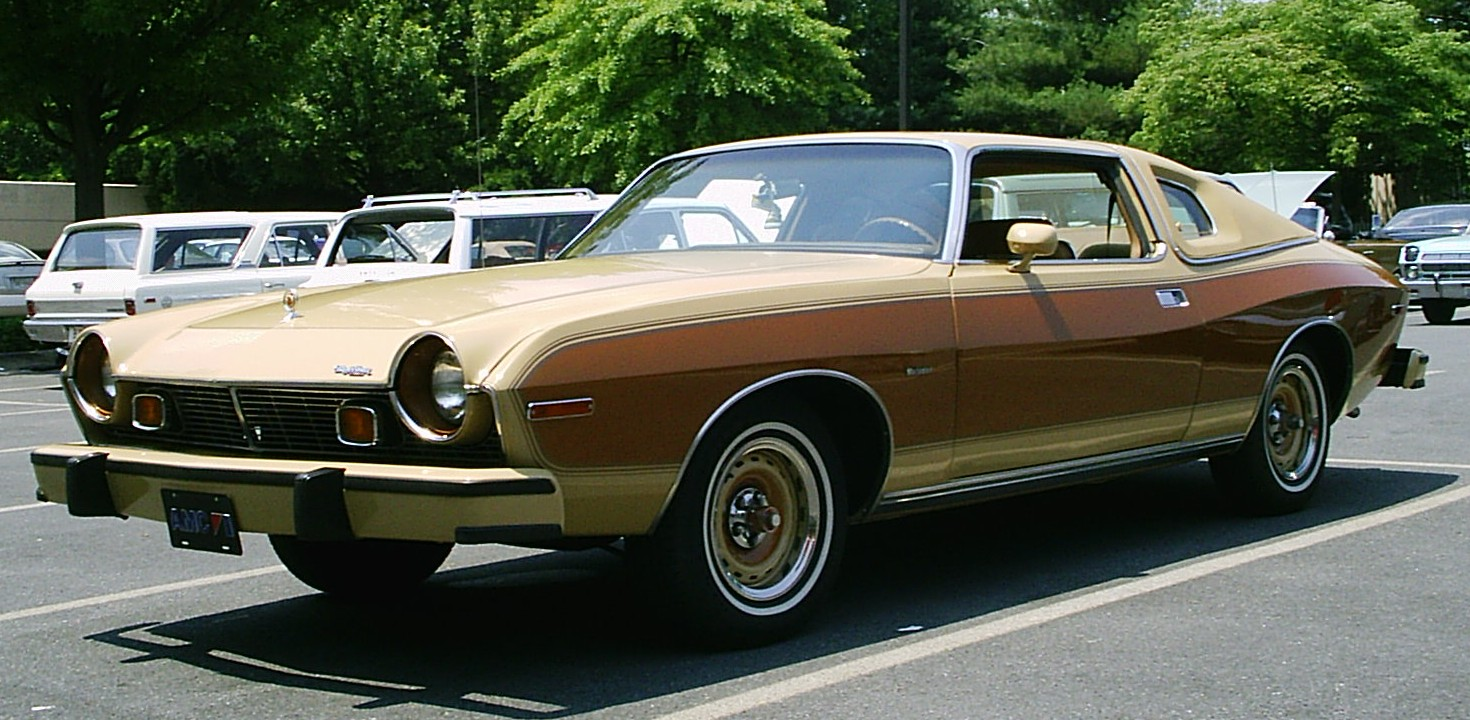
1977 Barcelona Coupe

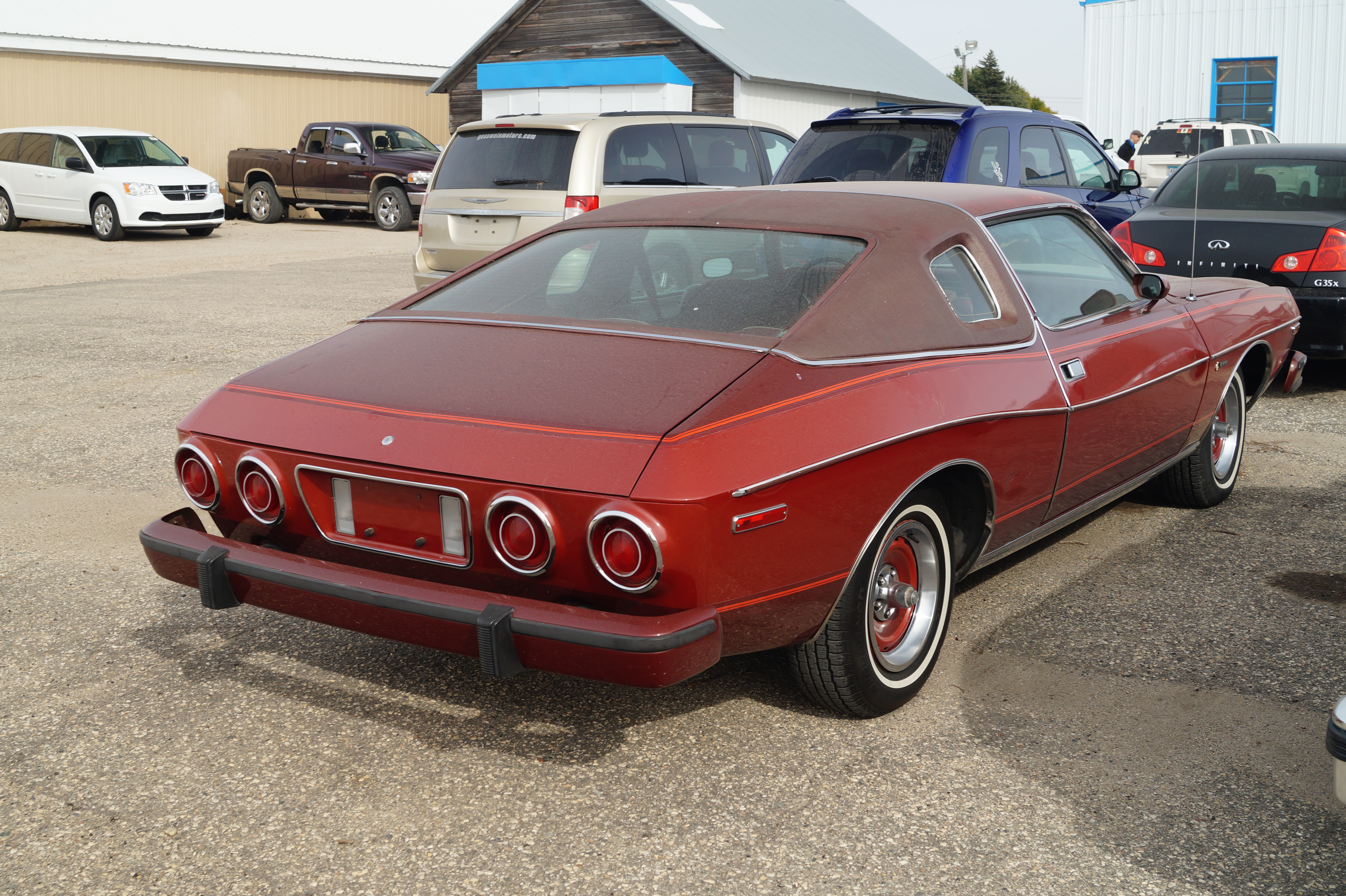
1978 Barcelona Coupe

For 1977 and 1978, the "Barcelona II" coupe featured a padded Landau roof with opera windows and pillow-top seats with velour upholstery. These styling cues and interior trims were favored at that time by buyers in the highly popular two-door "personal luxury" market segment. Initial production was available in only one distinctive two-tone paint pattern consisting of Golden Ginger Metallic with Sand Tan. A hood ornament featuring a stylized version of the Coat of arms of Barcelona came with the package.

The Barcelona included numerous comfort and appearance upgrades in addition to the extensive standard equipment that came on all Matadors. The special items were: individual reclining seats in velveteen crush fabric with woven accent stripes, custom door trim panels, unique headliner, 24 oz (680 g) carpeting, special "Barcelona" medallion on glove box door and front fenders, two-tone paint, headlight bezels painted accent color, two-tone finished 15-inch slot styled wheels, body-colored front and rear bumpers with rubber guards and nerf strips, landau padded vinyl roof, opera quarter windows with accents, dual remote control mirrors painted body color, black trunk carpet, rear sway bar, GR78x15 radial whitewall tires. The standard roll-down rear quarter windows were converted into fixed "opera windows" with fiberglass covers over the stock openings. finished with padded vinyl inside and out.

For the 1978 model year, the Barcelona package was available in a second color scheme: an Autumn Red Metallic on Claret Metallic combination, with a plush red interior. The 258 cu in (4.2 L) I6 with automatic transmission remained standard, but the 360 cu in (5.9 L) became the only V8 option. Production for this final year was 2,006 coupes.

Motor Trend magazine road tested a 1977 Barcelona II coupe and found it to be equal to all in the objective areas, as well as one of the most distinctive vehicles on the road that "makes a good deal of sense... if you're not put off by the Matador's unique lines."

== NASCAR racing ==
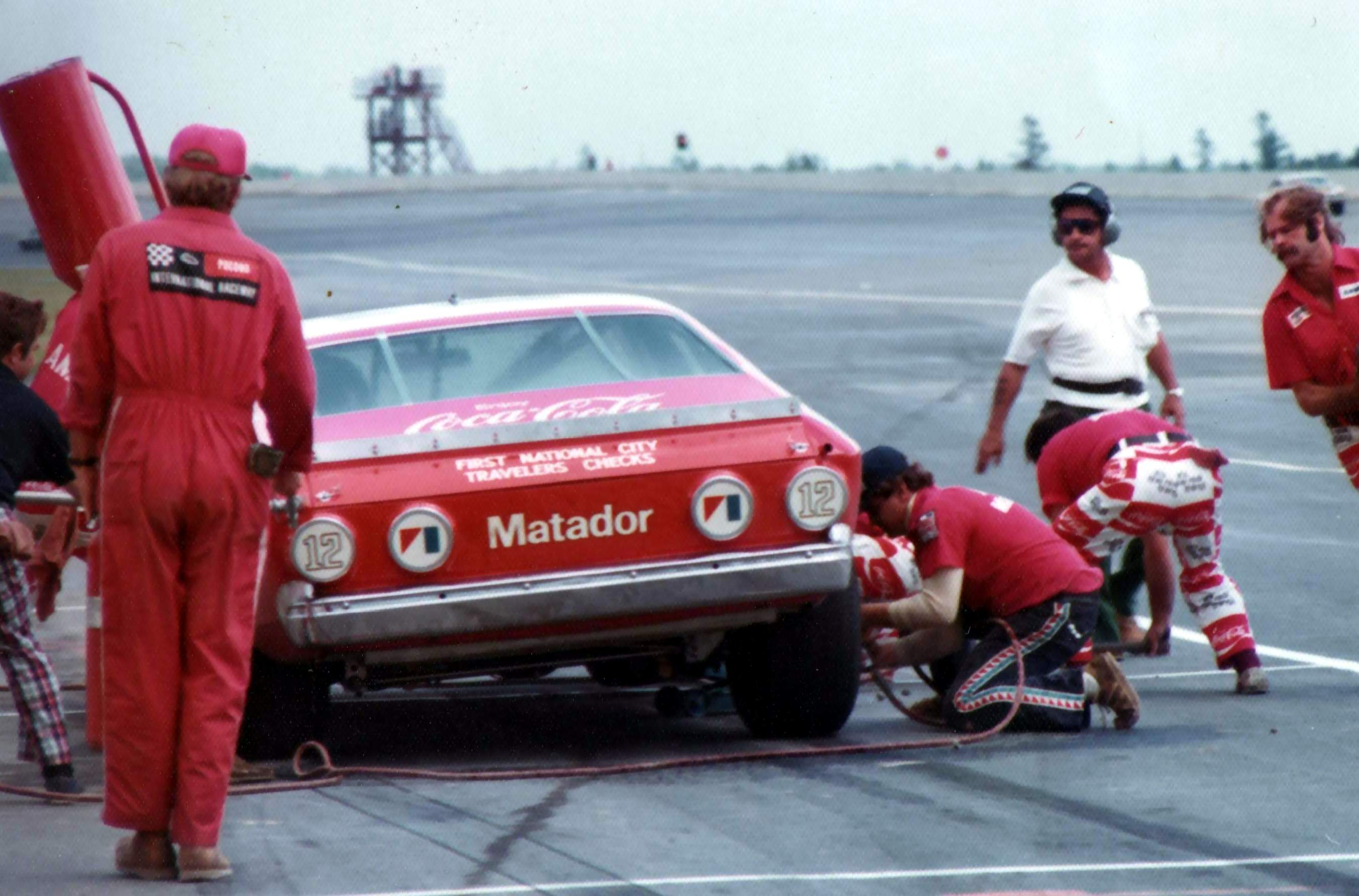
#12 NASCAR Matador during a pit stop

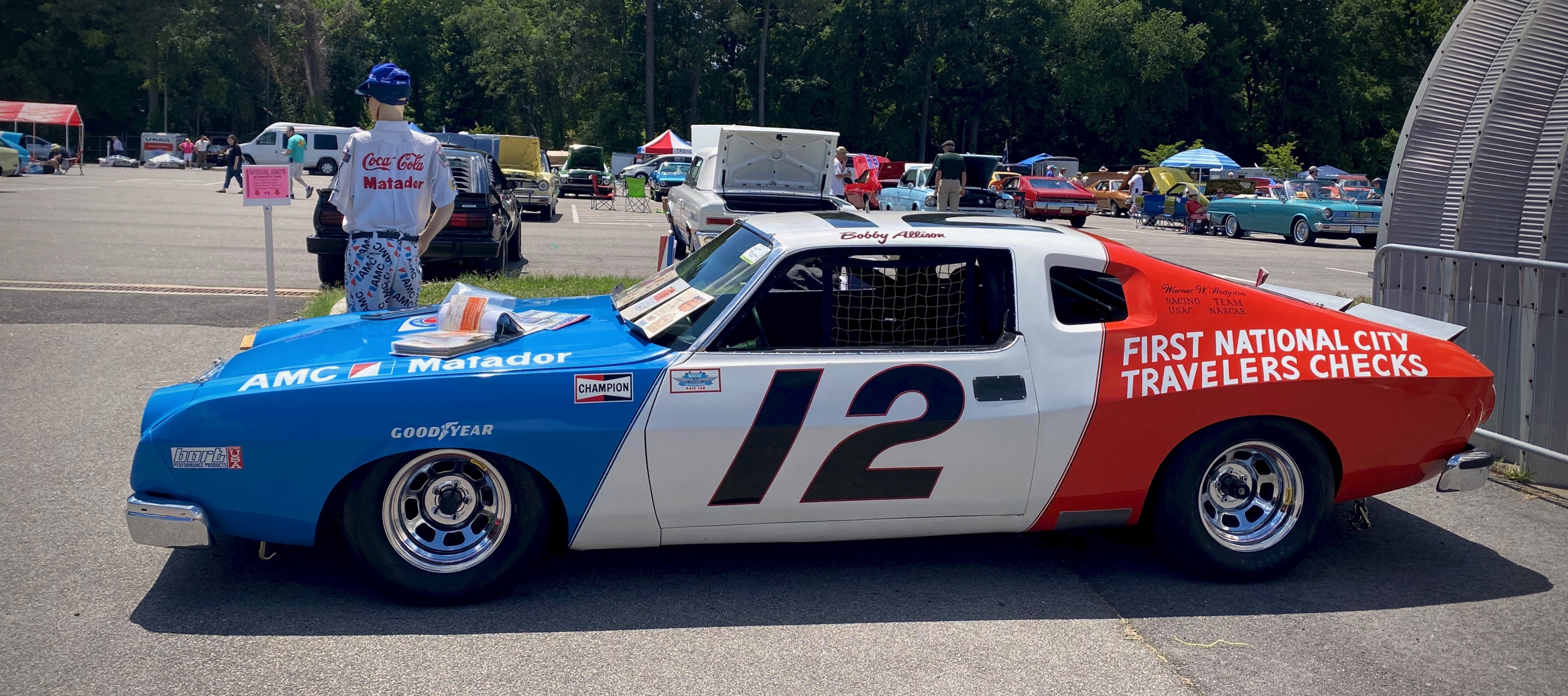
1974 Penske-Allison car owned by Bobby Allison

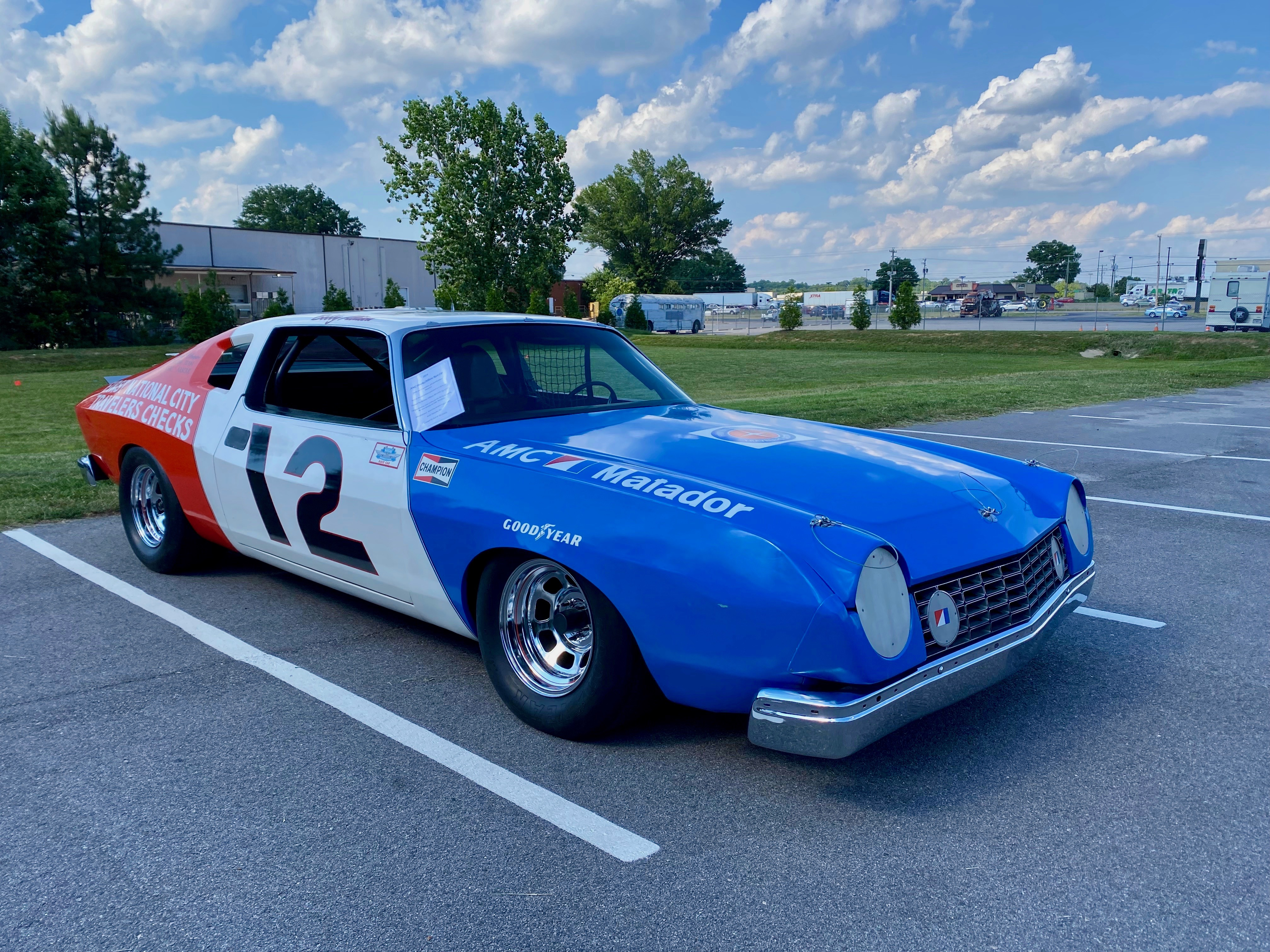
1974 AMC Matador #12 owned by Bobby Allison

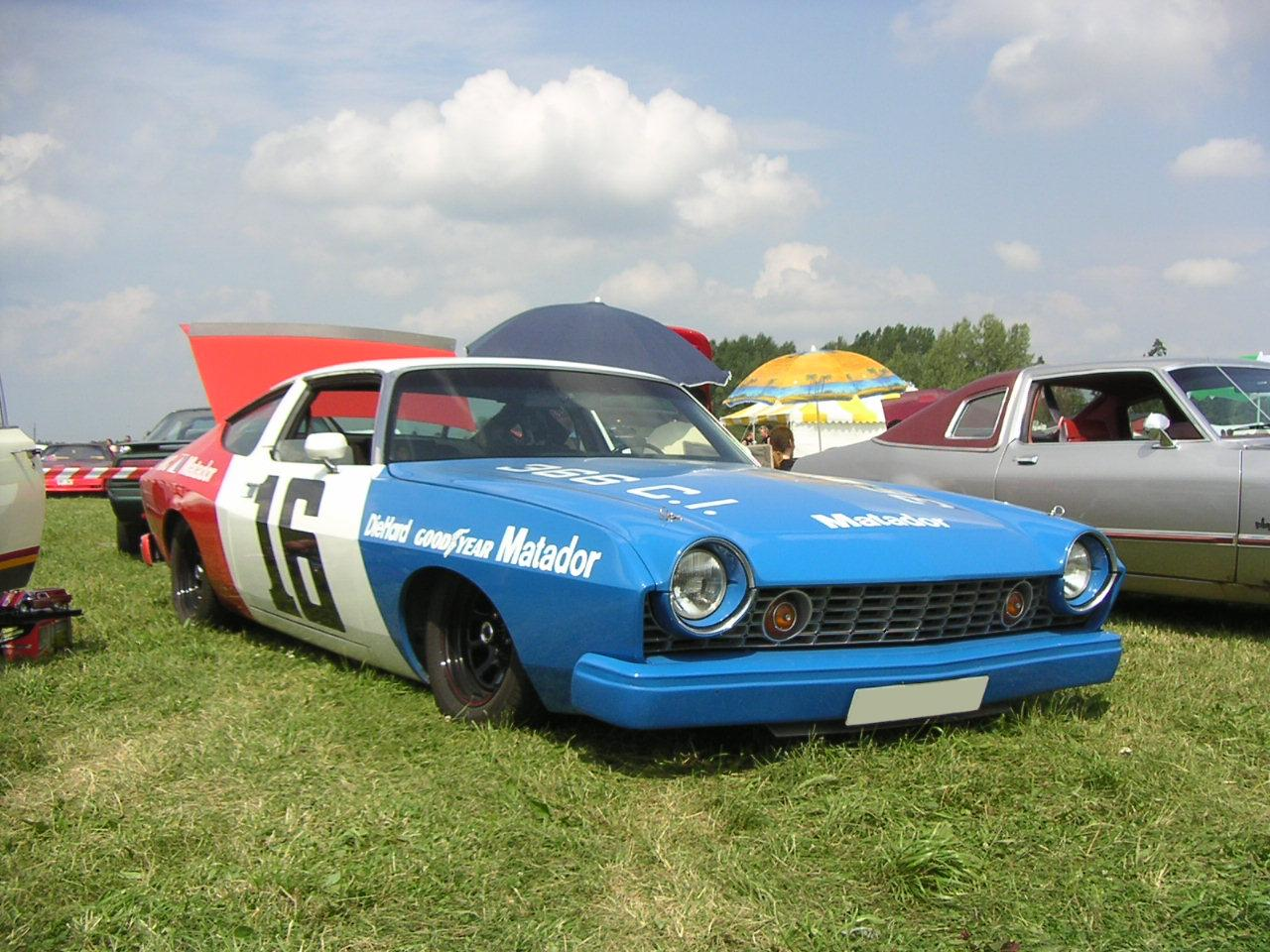
#16 NASCAR Matador tribute car in Sweden

Penske Racing prepared factory-backed Matador hardtops and coupes for NASCAR stock car tracks. Drivers included Indy winner Mark Donohue and NASCAR veteran Bobby Allison. The cars were considered underdogs that performed well against the large Chevrolet, Ford, and Dodge teams.

As it was AMC's first entry into NASCAR since the Hudson Hornet of predecessor company Hudson, the company's effort "raised eyebrows" for many NASCAR veterans because AMC was not known for cultivating a racing image. Racing pundits "initially scoffed at the notion of an AMC entry" on the circuit, but "the Matador acquired a fan following of its own."

Hutcherson-Pagan built a pair of 1972 two-door hardtop "Bull Fighters" for Roger Penske as the marque's first attempt at NASCAR in 1972. The Penske Matadors were raced for the first time in a road course race at Riverside, California, in 1972 with SCCA driver Mark Donohue, but retired early due to rear-end issues.

The start of NASCAR's 25th season in January 1973 at the Western 500 race witnessed the AMC Matador lapping every car. Driver Mark Donohue had his AMC Matador in the lead for 138 of the 191 laps and he was the only driver to complete every lap. It took nearly five hours to run the road course at Riverside, California, and Donohue gave AMC its first NASCAR win.

The Matador was one of the first oval stock cars to use disc brakes. After Donohue won the Western 500 with the first-generation Matador hardtop with four-wheel discs, other teams soon followed with the braking upgrade. According to Donohue, the braking system made a difference because "I could carry the car deeper in the corners and that's what it takes on a road course."

The 1974 Matador coupe's more aerodynamic shape replaced the previous "flying brick" two-door hardtop design. Penske said they did what they could with the old hardtop. The pre-1974 hardtop body style cars did better on tracks with more curves and fewer straightaways. However, Donohue did not survive to drive the new aerodynamically designed fastback coupe, which many believe was aimed at NASCAR racing.

The five wins for the AMC Matador are:

- Winston Western 500 – Riverside – Mark Donohue – 21 January 1973
- Los Angeles Times 500 – Ontario – Bobby Allison – 24 November 1974
- Winston Western 500 – Riverside – Bobby Allison – 19 January 1975
- Rebel 500 – Darlington – Bobby Allison – 13 April 1975
- Southern 500 – Darlington – Bobby Allison – 1 September 1975

Bobby Allison won the non-points Daytona 125 qualifying race on 13 February 1975 and finished second in the Daytona 500 three days later. Allison described, "The AMC Matadors were some of my favorite cars to race. Part of the reason I liked them was because they were incredibly popular with the fans."

An early serial number, pre-production 1974 Matador coupe, built by AMC and sent to the Penske organization, initially served as a show car. Bobby Allison owned the car for over 35 years and it has the No. 12 from his driving for Allison Motorsports in AMC cars.

== Police ==
The full-sized AMC Ambassador and the Matador models were available as police car versions from the factory. However, the smaller Matador would prove very popular.

The largest user of Matador patrol cars was the Los Angeles Police Department (LAPD), primarily from 1972 until 1974. After extensive testing of the special police models offered by GM, Ford, and Chrysler, the LAPD chose the AMC Matador because they "out-handled and outperformed all the other cars". A total of 534 units were purchased in 1972 by the LAPD. The LAPD police Matadors included, among other special equipment: T-2 can lights, a five-channel Motorola Mocom 70 VHF radio, a Federal PA-20A Interceptor siren, and a "Hot Sheet Desk" with a Roster gooseneck lamp.

Matador sedans and station wagons were also used by other agencies, including the Los Angeles Sheriffs Department and the Los Angeles Fire Department. The 1974 models would be the last year for the LAPD's purchase of the Matador. The second-generation longer-nosed restyle and the 5-mile-per-hour (8 km/h) bumpers added weight, affecting handling and performance. Moreover, after 1976, AMC "let the police car business go as it causes too many problems".

The states of Georgia and Alabama obtained 285 Matador police cars in 1972, with 31 of them used as "plain wrappers" (unmarked cars). Matadors were used by many other law enforcement and government agencies across the U.S. and Canada, as well as by military police units. Some remained in service until the mid-1980s.

While the horsepower ratings of V8 engines declined for many domestic sedans, AMC's 401 cu in (6.6 L) V8 out-powered most other police vehicles. Tests of the 1972 AMC Javelin pony car and Matador sedan equipped with the 401 V8s resulted in both running the quarter-mile dragstrip in the 14.7-second range. 0 to 60 mph (97 km/h) times were within 7 seconds, comparable to a 2006 Dodge Charger Police Package. The top speed was about 125 mph (201 km/h), which took 43 seconds, much faster than the previously used Plymouth Satellites.

The high-performance 401 cu in (6.6 L) V8 was last available in 1975, exclusively for fleet- and police-ordered sedans.

== In popular culture ==
=== Television shows ===
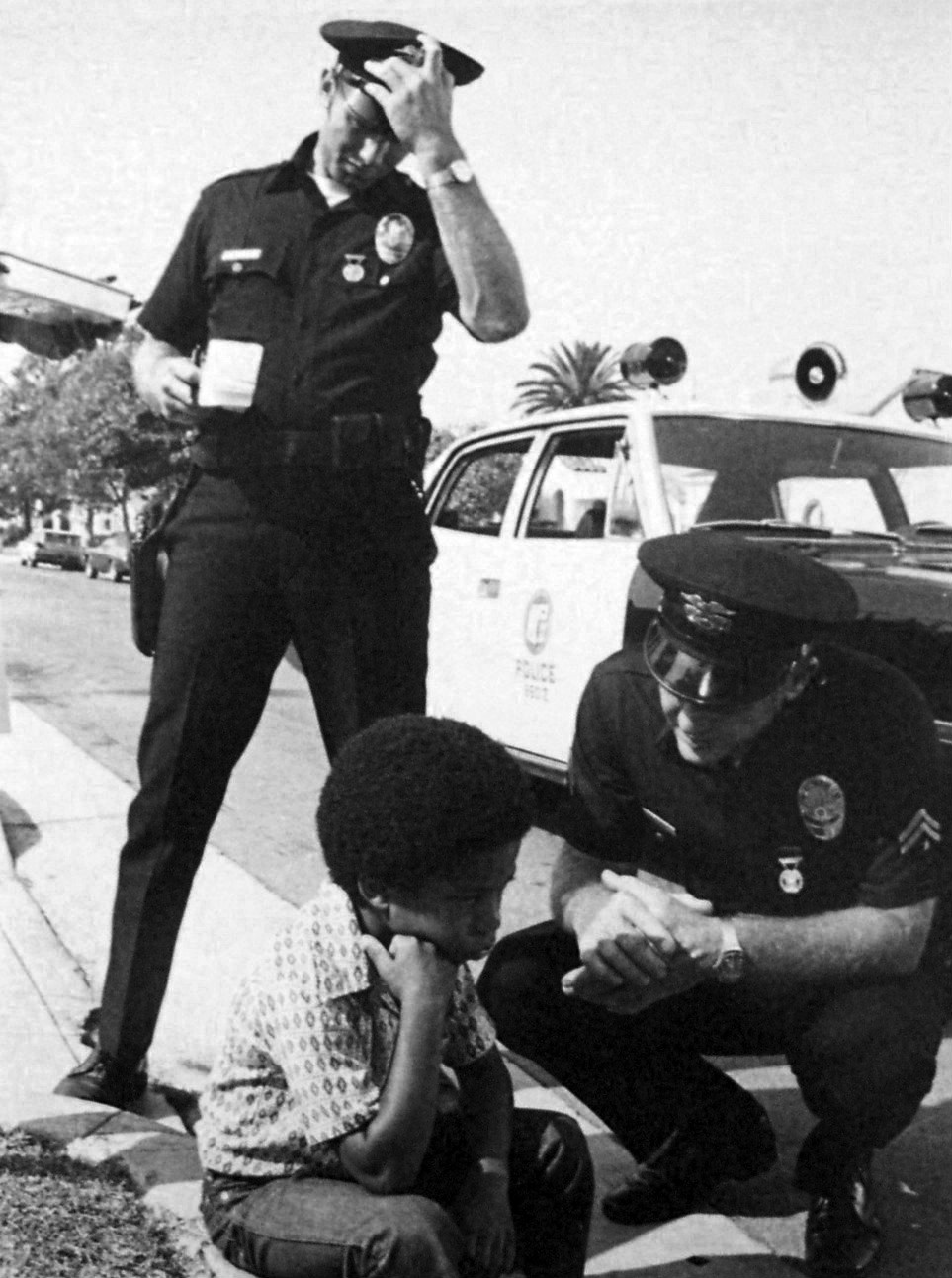
A 1972 AMC Matador was used in Adam-12 starting in its fifth season.

During the 1970s, AMC Matador police cars appeared in many television shows and episodes.

The vehicle was considered a character most famously in Adam-12 from 1972 until the show's end in 1975. The show's stars rode in a 1972 Matador while their division sergeant drove a 1972 Matador station wagon. In the sixth season, the lead character, Peter Malloy, bought a 1974 Matador coupe as his car and was featured in a few episodes. After the TV series ended, four Matadors were sold by a dealer to the Pasadena Police Department to serve as actual police cars as replacements for ones damaged in accidents. Adam-12's spin-off show, Emergency! featured Matadors as Los Angeles County Fire Department fire command vehicles and as police vehicles throughout the series.

American Motors was a sponsor of the television series Wonder Woman in later seasons; thus, AMC cars were often used by characters or seen in the background. Wonder Woman's personal car was a 1978 Concord AMX, and Colonel Steve Trevor drove a 1978 Matador Barcelona sedan in some episodes.

=== James Bond film placement ===
As part of a significant product placement strategy, an AMC Matador coupe played a starring role in The Man with the Golden Gun, released in 1974. It featured the newly introduced Matador Brougham Coupe in the Oleg Cassini edition, along with several Matador four-door police cars (in the black and white livery used by the Los Angeles Police Department), and a Hornet X hatchback. The Matador is the car of Francisco Scaramanga, and along with Nick Nack, they use the "flying" AMC Matador to kidnap Mary Goodnight. With its wings, the stunt car was 9.15 metres (30 ft) long, 12.80 m (42 ft) wide, and 3.08 m (10 ft) high. A stuntman drove the "car plane" to a runway. It was not airworthy, so a 1 metre (39 in)-long remote controlled model, built by John Stears, was used for the aerial sequences.

The "flying AMC Matador" was exhibited at auto shows, part of AMC's marketing efforts for the aerodynamically designed coupe, as well as publicity exposure for the concept of unique flying machines.

== International production ==
=== Australia ===
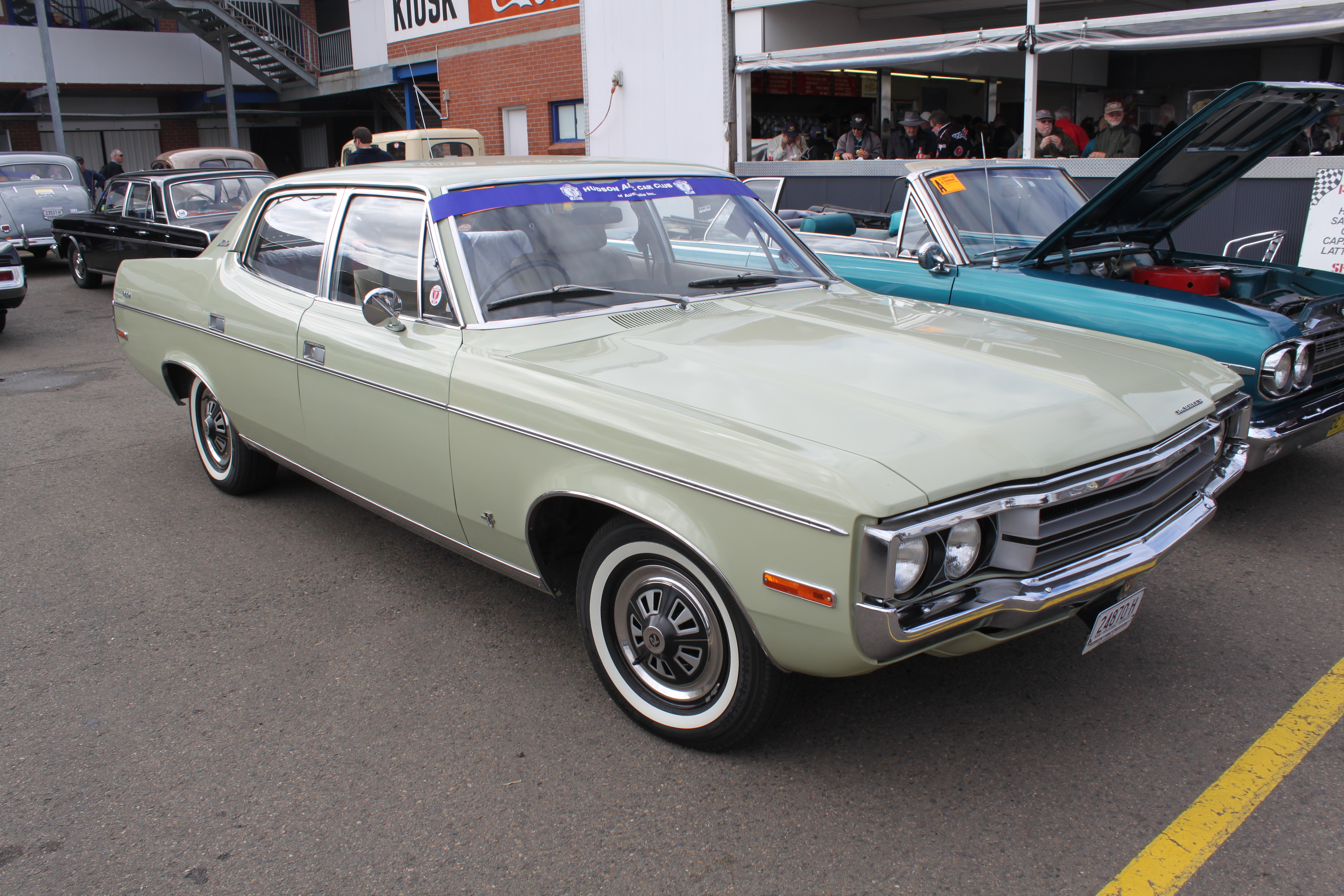
First-generation Rambler Matador sedan in New South Wales, assembled by AMI

Australian assembly of the Matador by Australian Motor Industries (AMI) started in 1971, and concluded at the end of 1976. The final cars were sold in 1977. The AMI cars were marketed as the Rambler Matador. Australian Motor Industries also acted as the State distributor for Victoria. Sales for New South Wales were managed by the Sydney company, Grenville Motors, which was also the State distributor for Rover and Land Rover vehicles. A network of Sydney and country NSW dealers was managed by Grenville, which was in communication with AMI. Australian Capital Territory sales were managed by Betterview in Canberra. Annand & Thompson in Brisbane distributed Rambler vehicles for Queensland. South Australian sales were managed by Champions in Adelaide. Premier Motors in Perth distributed Ramblers for Western Australia, and Heathco Motors in Launceston distributed Rambler vehicles for Tasmania.

American Motors' cars in Australia were built from Partial Knock-down kits (PKD). They were shipped from AMC's Kenosha factory. The bodies arrived with right-hand drive and were equipped with the drive train (engine, transmission, and rear axle), as well as front and rear suspensions. Other parts were boxed and shipped inside the vehicles for final assembly in AMI's facilities in Port Melbourne, Victoria. AMI used the same paint codes for the Matadors as the Toyota and Triumph vehicles they also assembled. These paint codes did not correspond to the AMC paint codes; thus, Australian Matador colors are unique. Numerous other parts and components were sourced locally to gain tariff concessions.

All exterior model year changes corresponded to those of U.S. production. However, Australian production of each model continued into the following year. The final first-generation 1973 model was assembled through the end of 1975. The U.S. 1974 second-generation Matador was made in Australia from December 1975 until December 1976. The Matador coupe was assembled in 1976 and only marketed in 1977.

Standard equipment included an automatic transmission, power steering, power windows, a locally fitted under-dash air conditioning system, and an AM radio for the sedan and wagon models. The engine was AMC's 360 cu in (5.9 L) V8 with a two-barrel Autolite 2100 carburetor, following its introduction in the 1970 Rebel. From 1973, the Autolite 2100 was replaced by the four-barrel, Autolite 4300 carburetor.

Although superseded by AMC in the United States, Australian Matadors continued to be built with the heavier-duty steering components used in Ramblers with power steering until 1967.

Available options included an exterior-mounted sun visor, a vinyl roof cover, a tow hitch, and mud flaps. The cars were targeted at the top market segment, advertised as "the American luxury limousine made for Australians", and built for Australian conditions.

Along with the vehicle modifications needed for Australian standards and market requirements, changes included the use of locally sourced parts and components such as seats, carpeting, headlamps, side-view mirrors, heaters, and unique "R"-logo wheel covers. Under Australia's local content laws, this Australian-sourced componentry reduced the tariff added to each car.

The World Forum for Harmonization of Vehicle Regulations (1958) and The Australian Design Rules (first published in 1969) permitted only amber-color rear direction turn signals on Australian motor vehicles with four wheels, thus red-color turn signals and combination brake/turn signals were prohibited in Australia. Therefore, Matador sedans had amber lenses in place of the transparent reversing lens portion of the tail light assembly; these served as combination turn signal/backup lights. Matador station wagons had amber add-on lights fitted into the tailgate. (Note: Privately imported motor vehicles from the United States do not have to be retrofitted with amber direction indicators if built before July 1, 1973, as per Rule 100(3)(b)(ii) of the Australian Light Vehicle Standards Rules 2015.)

As with its Rebel predecessor, Matador hardtops were not marketed in Australia. AMI's two-door offering was instead the Rambler Javelin, assembled in Australia.

==== 1971 ====
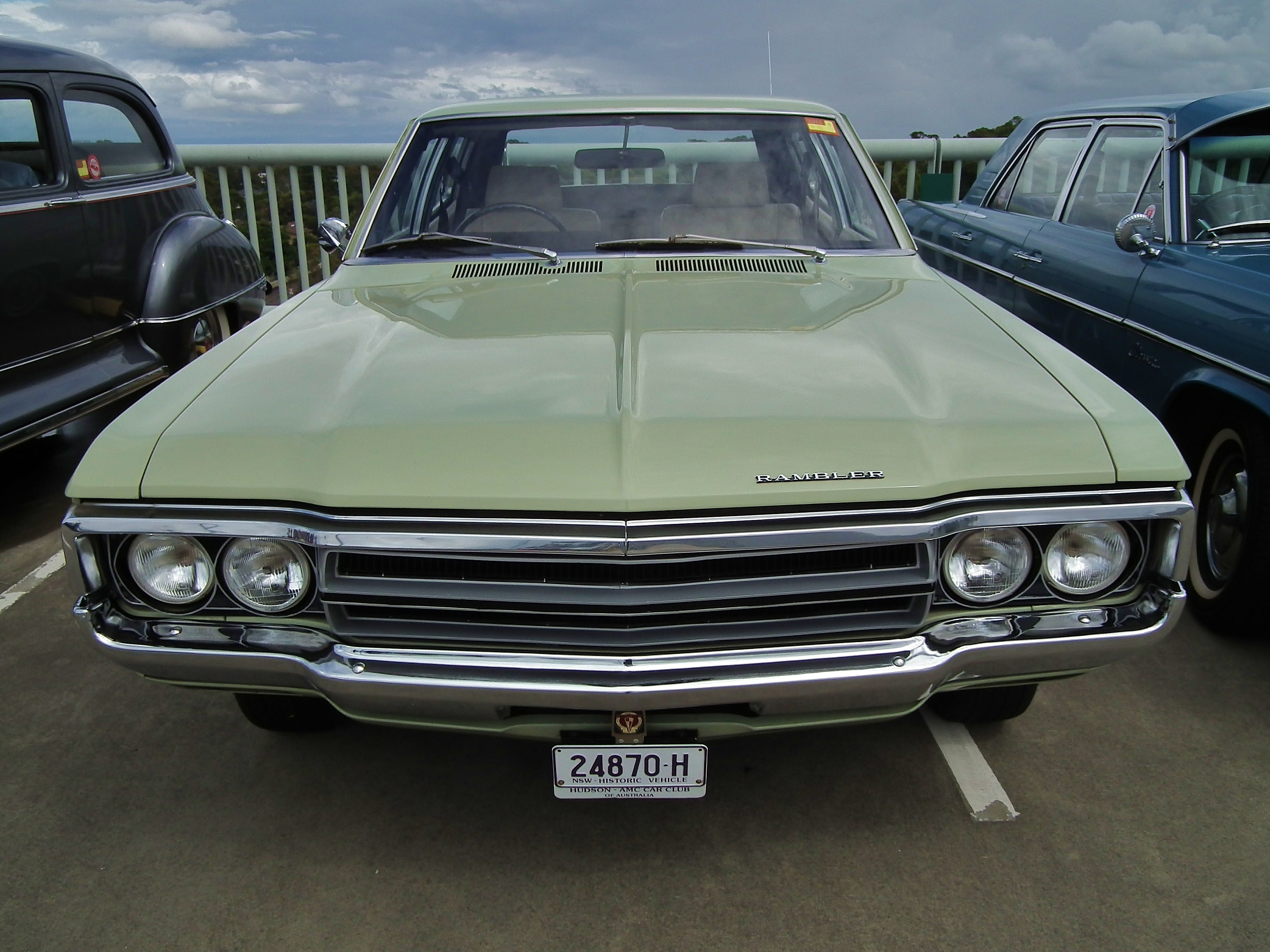
1971 Matador, assembled by AMI in 1972. These right-hand drive cars still had left-sweep windshield wipers.

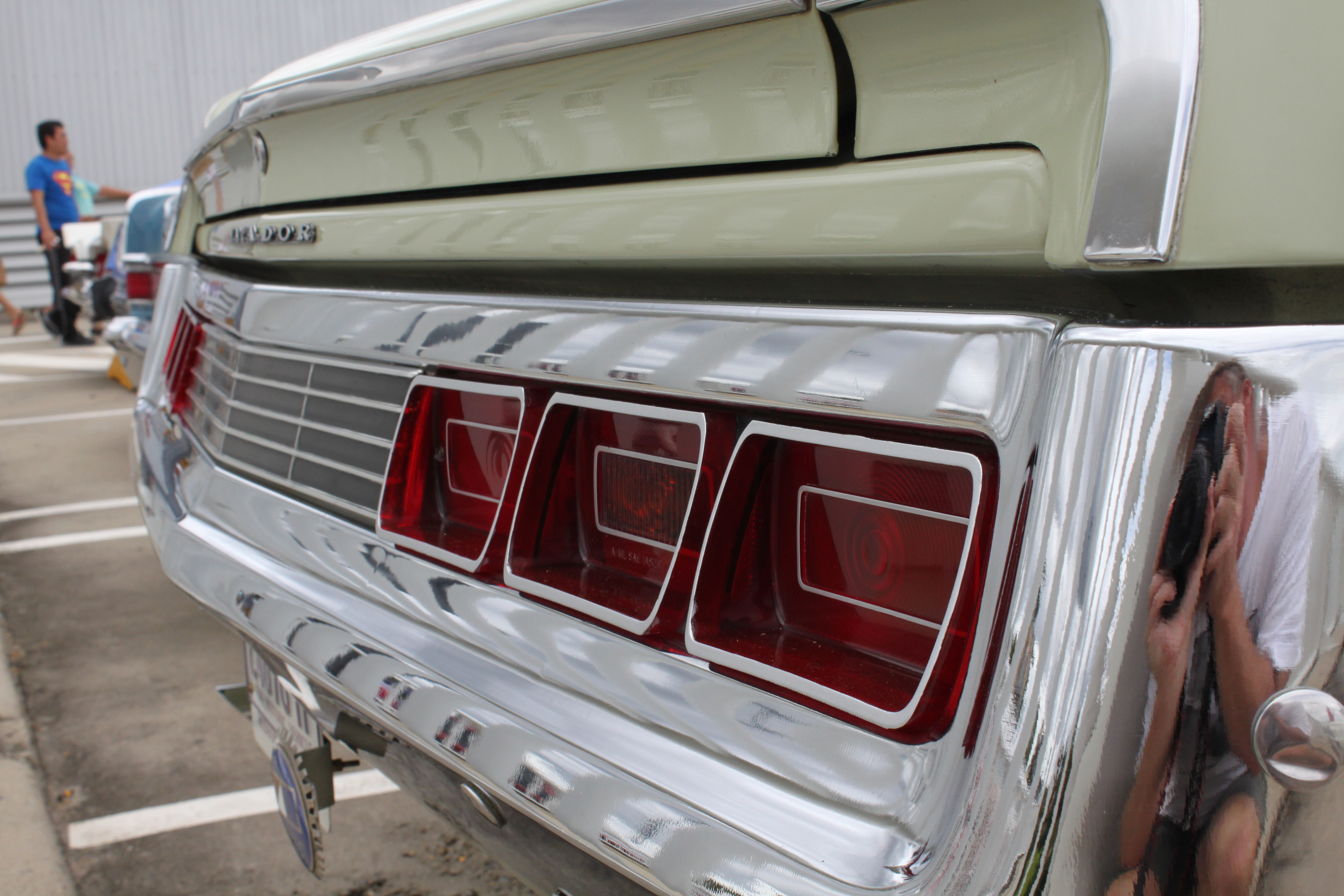
The reverse lenses on 1971 models were rewired as turn signals and fitted with an orange insert so that the normally clear lenses would flash orange.

Australian Motor Industries continued to assemble the 1970 AMC Rebel into late 1971. In the latter part of the year, AMI began assembly of the 1971 Matador. The AMI-built Matador was available in sedan and wagon body styles, with AMC's 360 cu in (5.9 L) engine, and Borg-Warner automatic transmission. The dual exhaust and "Twin-Grip" differential options from the U.S "Go package" were standard on the Australian models. The sedan's list price was AU$6,395, and the wagon was AU$7,395.

As with the previous Australian-assembled Rebel models, the AMI-assembled Matador continued to use the dash of the U.S. 1967 Rambler Ambassador, first used in the right-hand drive Ambassadors produced for the United States Postal Service in 1967, including the three-lever Weather Eye heater unit and an analog clock to the left of the instrument fascia. The black, round instrument dials of the U.S. 1970 Ambassador were also reused. A black metal plate with an image of a bull and a bullfighter covered the cavity to the right side of the fascia, where the radio was mounted on U.S. models. Instead, an AM radio unit was fitted into the center of the dash, above the ashtray.

Locally sourced air conditioning included an under-dash evaporator unit. The seats for the 1971 model consisted of a locally made vinyl full bench seat, with a fold-down center armrest for both front and rear seats, and headrests for the front seats. Interior door panels were locally made in the style of the U.S. model but with cutouts to accommodate the right-hand drive positioning of the power window controls (from the U.S. AMC Ambassador), and the rear door panels came standard with ashtrays. Interior color choices included crimson, black, cream, or brown, but the plastic trim, dashboard, steering column, and steering wheel were all finished in black.

The lighting system was modified to meet Australian regulations: The front turn signals used clear lenses rather than the U.S. amber ones; the front and rear side marker lights were amber rather than amber front/red rear as in the U.S. model, and were wired as additional turn signals; and the inner taillights were fitted with amber lenses and used as combination turn signal/back-up lights.

The Australian Matador also came with unique "R" logo hub caps, made locally. The full-sized stainless steel hubcaps with the "American Motors" lettering featured on the U.S. and New Zealand-market 1970 Rebel and U.S. 1971 Matador not available as an option in Australia. Apart from the hubcaps, the 1971 Australian Matador was identical externally as the 1971 U.S. models.

Unlike the U.S. models, Australian Matadors came standard with power steering and power windows. They continued to have the RHD steering components of the mid-1960s versions. Despite their right-hand drive, the Australian Matadors retained the left-sweep windshield wipers.

A total of 307 Rebels, 69 Matadors, and 64 station wagons were registered in Australia in 1971.

==== 1972 ====
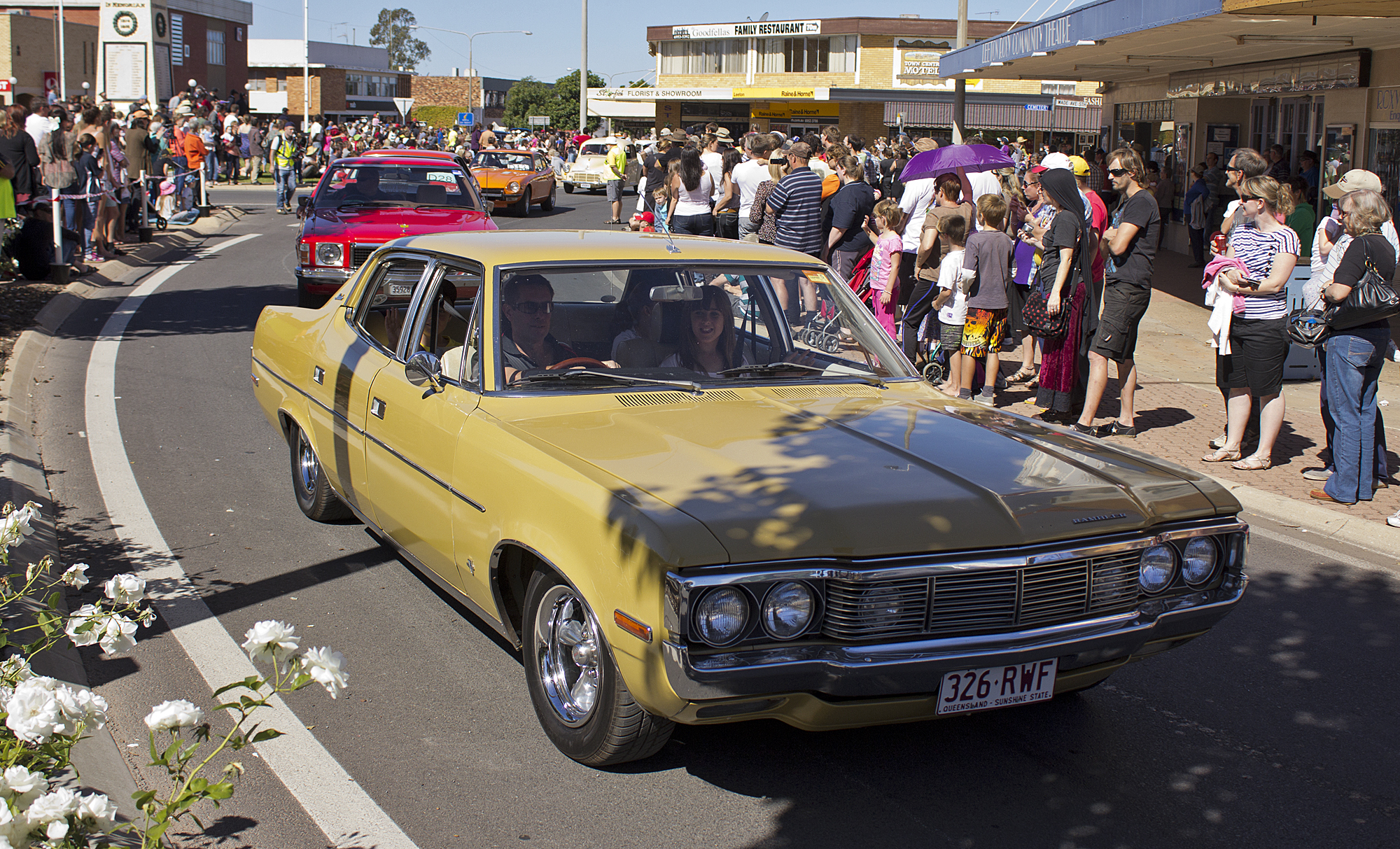
Australian 1972 Rambler Matador. 1972 models were also assembled into 1973.

Australian Motor Industries assembled the U.S. 1971 version through 1972, but marketed it as a "1972" model. The U.S. face-lifted 1972 Matador was built by AMI starting July 1972, with station wagons made from November 1972.

As with the U.S. model, the Australian 1972 sedan and wagon came with the new Torqueflite 727 transmission and the new-for-1972 external and internal styling changes.

The black instrument dials of the U.S. 1970 Ambassador were again reused in the RHD 1967 Ambassador dash. The revised door armrests of the U.S. 1972 model were consistent with the Australian 1972 model. The front bench seats were again locally made, featuring individually reclinable driver and passenger seatbacks and a fold-down middle armrest. The rear seat was identical to the 1971 Australian model. The locally made door panels from the 1971 model were continued, allowing for the RHD power window controls.

To comply with the Australian requirement for amber rear turn signals, the backup light lenses on sedans were fitted with an amber insert. Station wagons had aftermarket amber trailer lights attached to the tailgate. Front turn signal lenses on all models were clear.

The Australian "R" hub caps were reused for the 1972 model. Power windows, power antenna, under-dash air conditioning, and the earlier Rambler interior steering components remained standard.

A total of 300 Matadors (236 sedans and 64 station wagons) were sold in 1972, most of them 1971 U.S. models.

==== 1973 ====
Australian Motor Industries continued to assemble the U.S. 1972 model into 1973. Production of the U.S. 1973 model began in October 1973. The Australian 1973 Matador was identical to the U.S. 1973 model, incorporating grille and taillight changes. All Australian cars were built with the earlier Rambler's heavier-duty steering components and heavy-duty suspension.

A four-barrel carburetor replaced the two-barrel carburetor on the 360 cu in (5.9 L) V8, providing for an 11.4% increase in brake horsepower and a 3.5% increase in torque despite the addition of emission controls.

As Australia adopted amber front turn signals in 1973, AMI discontinued the transparent parking light/turn signal lenses and instead installed rectangular amber trailer/truck lenses in the lens housing. For the rear, the backup light lenses on sedans were fitted with an amber-colored plastic overlay. Station wagons continued to be fitted with amber trailer lights screwed into the tailgate for their turn signals.

From 1973, Matadors were fitted with Australian-made front vinyl upholstered 50–50 split bench seats, each with fold-down armrests and headrests. The new headrests were a slimmer design than the 1971 and 1972 versions. The rear bench seat remained the same. The locally made door panels, first used in the Australian 1971 model, remained unchanged. Power windows, power steering, under-dash air conditioning, and electric aerial remained standard.

A change was made to the passenger-side dash from the 1973 model onwards. The design of the 1967 Ambassador flat dash pad was replaced with a more protruding unit that ran flush with the instrument cluster binnacle and without space for a speaker. Speakers were now mounted on both front door panels. Otherwise, the dash was the same as previous models, but new for 1973 was the introduction of the white-backed instrument cluster of the U.S.-made 1972 and 1973 Matador, displaying speed in miles per hour.

For 1973, Australian registrations were 230 Matadors (191 sedans, 39 station wagons). Most were the U.S. 1972 models.

==== 1974 ====
For 1974, AMI continued to assemble the U.S. 1973 model, marketing it as a "1974" model.

Changes for the year included the introduction of white instrument dials (in use on U.S. models since 1972), now displaying kilometers per hour (km/h). The horn pad and steering wheel of the U.S 1973 Matador (without the "bullseye" logo) were replaced with the slightly smaller steering wheel and interchangeable horn pad of the AMC Hornet (with the "AMC" logo in the center.) Also for 1974, the three-point retractable seat belts for the front and rear were fitted, replacing the two-point sash belts. The locally made split-bench front and rear seats from the 1973 model were carried over, as were the locally made door panels from the U.S. 1971 model. Right-hand sweep windshield wipers were now incorporated to match the driver's position.

A total of 145 Matadors (118 sedans, 27 station wagons) were sold in Australia in 1974. All were U.S. 1973 models.

==== 1975 ====
For 1975, AMI continued to assemble the U.S. 1973 model, marketing it as a "1975" model. All the standard features of the original U.S. 1973 model and local year-by-year changes were retained.

Assembly of the second-generation Matador sedan and wagon, released in the United States for the 1974 model year, was delayed in Australia until December 1975.

Registrations for 1975 were 118 Matadors (85 sedans, 33 station wagons), including the first few second-generation models assembled at the end of 1975.

==== 1976 ====
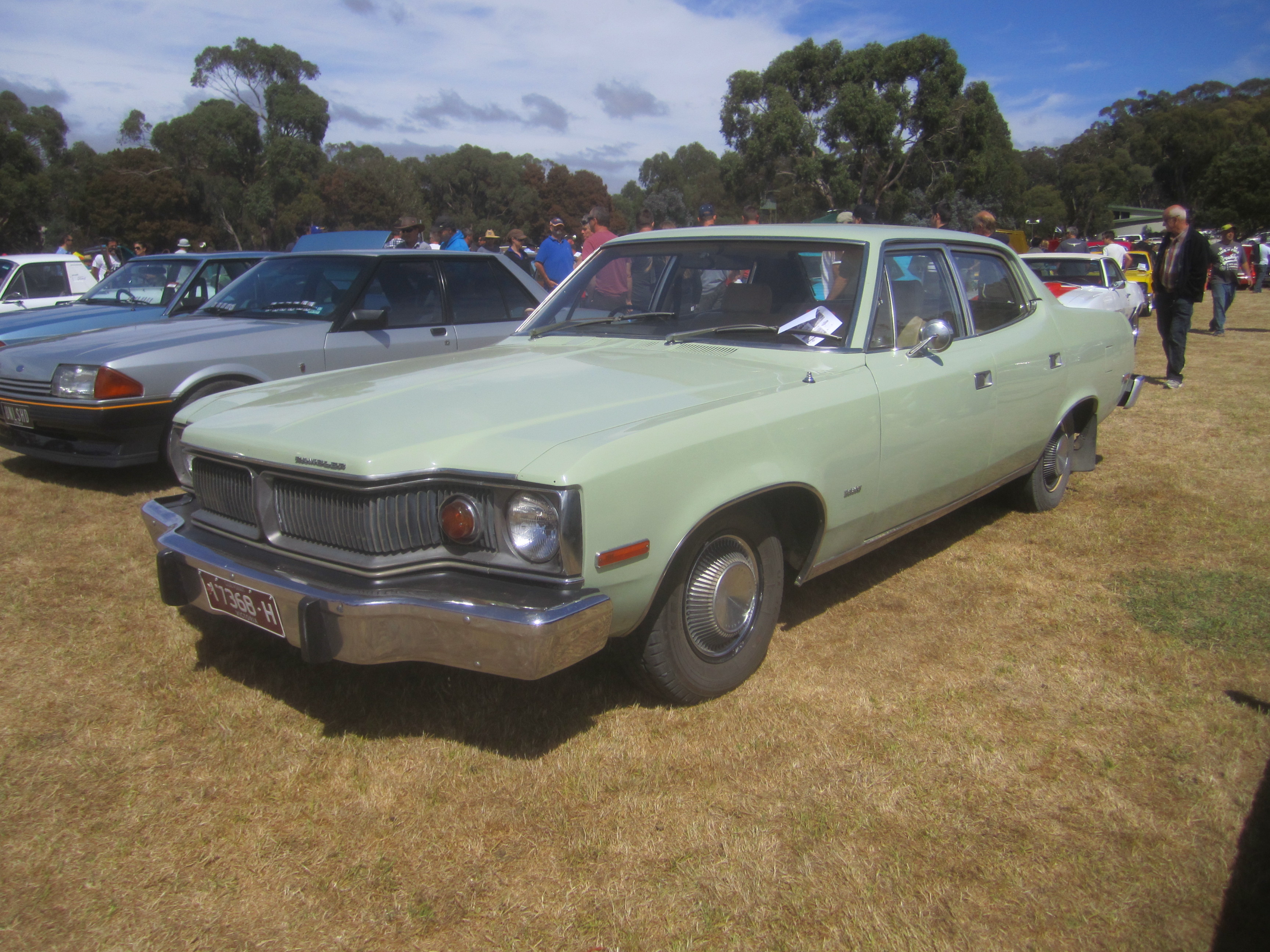
1976 (U.S 1974) Australian-assembled Rambler Matador sedan

Australian Motor Industries assembled the U.S. 1974 second-generation Matador sedan and wagon through 1976, marketing it as the new "1976" model. The first few were built in December 1975. The new Matador was priced at $9,810 for the sedan and $10,951 for the station wagon.

Externally, it was identical to the U.S 1974 model, even using the U.S. stainless steel, full-size wheel covers that AMC had been using since 1972, but now for the first time in Australia.

As with the previous models, the 1967 Rambler Ambassador dash assembly was reused, but was now fitted with the 1974 U.S.-type three-pod instrument cluster. The 1967 Ambassador Weather Eye unit, previously positioned to the left of the instrument dials in previous models, was repositioned to the right. The Australian-made seats in use since the 1973 model and the locally made door cards in use since the 1971 model were continued with no changes. The revised steering wheel with the rectangular horn pad of the 1974 U.S. version was used on Australian models until the end of production. To comply with Australian Vehicle Standards rules requiring only amber turn signals, the tail light assemblies were swapped so that the original right-side assembly was fitted to the left side, and vice versa. Thus, the reverse lights were on the outside rather than the inside, as on the U.S. models. A rectangular, plastic amber insert was attached over the clear reverse lenses, and the lights were rewired as both reverse lights and turn signals.

All Australian second-generation Matadors continued to be powered with the AMC 360 cu in (5.9 L) V8 engine with automatic transmission, as with the first-generation Australian-built Matadors. From about June 1976, AMI fitted the Matador sedans with a "Heavy Duty Fleet Engine" with a four-barrel carburetor and electronic ignition. There were no other engine or transmission options.

The hood latch on the second-generation Australian Matadors remained on the passenger (left) side of the dashboard. In contrast, previous Australian Matadors had the bonnet latch on the driver's (right) side, as would be the case on a right-hand drive vehicle. Under-dash air conditioning, power windows, electric aerial, and the 1960s steering componentry remained standard.

Australian license plates are wider than U.S. plates, so a sheet of folded steel was screwed to the license plate area of the body as an extension for the Australian plate to be affixed. A generic trailer light unit was affixed to the extension for the number plate light.

Documented registrations in 1976 were 88 Matadors (78 sedans and ten station wagons).

==== 1977 ====
A few Matadors assembled in December 1976 were registered in 1977.

Documented registrations for 1977 were 27 Matadors, of which 24 were sedans and three station wagons.

==== Production Number Discrepancies ====
The official registration figures of Australian second-generation Matador sedans and wagons are at odds with the actual number of Matadors produced, as there are known models with body numbers in the 200s and 300s despite registrations supposedly totaling 102 sedans and 13 wagons. Additionally, the document issued by AMI in November 1976 regarding the fitting of heavy-duty fleet engines to Matadors states, "...the engines have been fitted in numerical sequence from Body number 180 to Body number 248 and are matched to engine numbers A1221PF to A1289PF." Those with the fleet engines to which this document pertains were built in June 1976. Matadors continued to be built thereafter until December 1976.

AMI built 320 Matador sedans and 60 Matador wagons in Australia between December 1975 and December 1976. The reason for the misreporting has been attributed to new Matadors having been registered as "Other" instead of "Rambler" at the time of first registration.

==== Matador Coupe ====
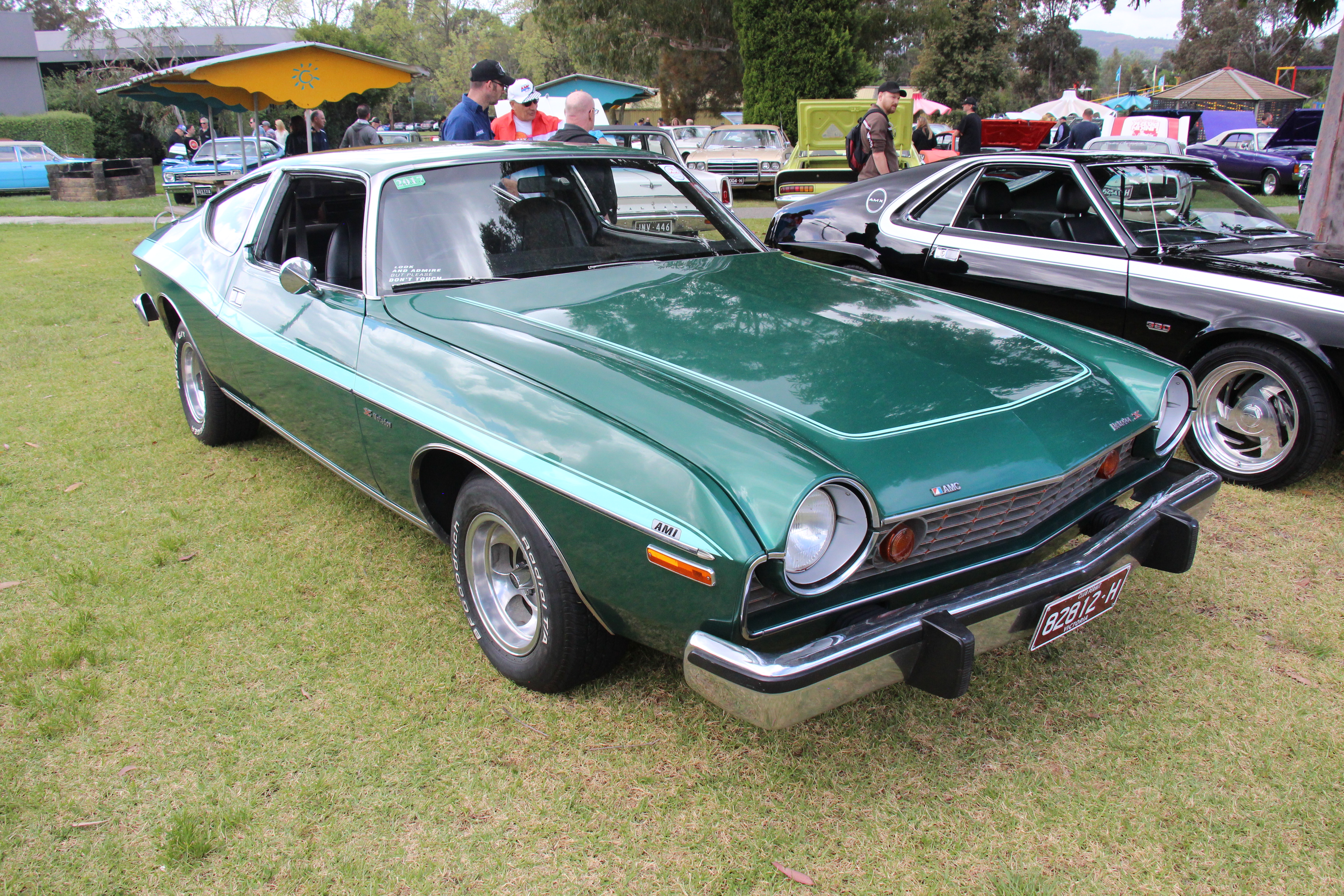
Rambler Matador X Coupe assembled by AMI

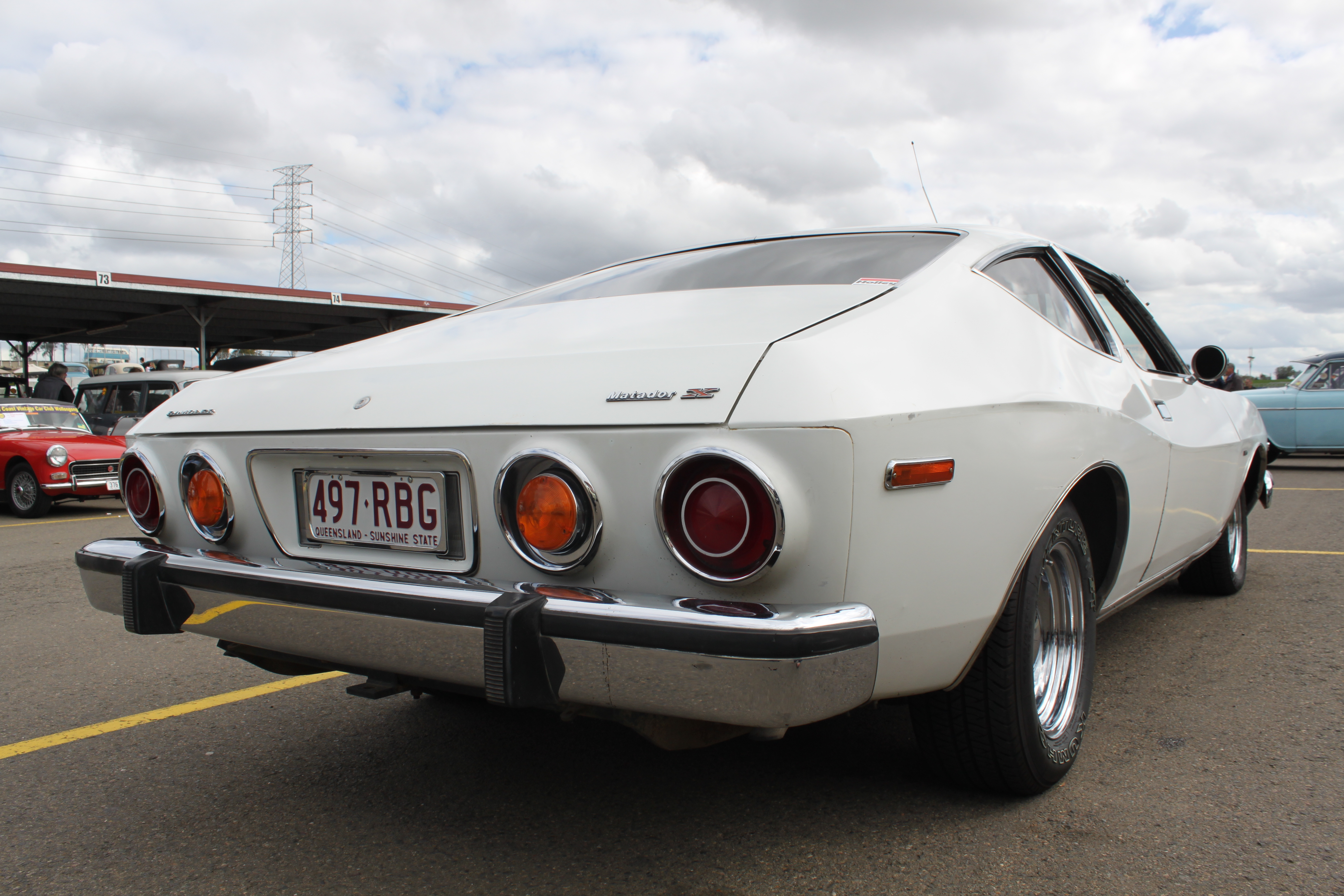
Australian Matador X Coupe. Orange lenses replaced the original red turn-signal lenses.

A fully built AMC Matador X Coupe was imported and presented at the Melbourne International Motor Show in 1974 to gauge interest. The evaluation car was converted from left-hand-drive to right-hand-drive by an outside company for the show. AMI dealers announced that there would be 80 assembled for the Australian market. One media outlet reporting on the show stated, "As an indication that U.S cars are now very passe, most showgoers drifted by with hardly a glance for the car, preferring to paw over the bread-and-butter Toyota range." Other media reports were more optimistic, stating that they expected the model to sell out quickly.

Although AMI received 160 knock-down kits for the all-new Matador Coupe in 1974, they did not assemble them until late 1976. By the mid-1970s, AMI focused more on producing Toyotas and wanted to build something other than the Matador coupes. The knock-down kits were purposefully exposed to the elements outside for many months to achieve an insurance write-off. However, the loss assessors adjudicated that 90 cars were still salvageable. Of the 160 kits AMI received, 70 were destroyed, 80 were assembled, and ten were held as parts.

Priced at $11,986, the model was marketed through 1977 and sold for only one year. Australian models came with AMC's 360 cu in (5.9 L) V8, a three-speed automatic transmission, the U.S. Matador X sports steering wheel, and bucket seats. Air conditioning, electric antenna, and AM/FM radio were standard.

Because of the low production numbers (under 100), AMI avoided re-engineering the left-hand drive wiper to a right-hand sweep as they had done on the Matador sedans and wagons after 1974. All Australian Matador coupes were badged as the sportier Matador X.

Right-hand-drive Matador sedans, wagons, and the Matador Coupe were assembled using AMC's RHD dashboard, which was introduced in 1967. However, the instrument dials, center column, and steering wheel on the Australian Matador Coupe were from the U.S. 1974 model. To satisfy Australian design regulations, the inner taillamps were replaced with a round orange lens to flash amber as a turn signal, while the outer lights remained the original red lens as a combination tail light and brake light.

=== Costa Rica ===
Purdy Motor in San Jose assembled Matadors in Costa Rica from knock-down kits.

Purdy Motor acquired the franchise rights to market American Motors vehicles in 1959. It had imported complete cars to Costa Rica. It was not until 1964 that Costa Rican law permitted the assembly of vehicles locally. Purdy Motor built an assembly plant in 1965, and the first locally manufactured Rambler was a 1964 Rambler Classic 660, which came off the line in late 1965. The all-new 1967 Rebel was assembled to production end, followed by the Matador from 1971.

As with other export markets, the Matador was marketed in Costa Rica under the Rambler marque even after the marque was retired by AMC in its home market after 1969.

In 1974, a new local vehicle manufacturer, Motorizada de Costa Rica, purchased the rights to the Rambler distributorship from Purdy Motor. Motorizada continued assembling AMC and Jeep vehicles, as well as those from other brands, until 1978. Motorizada was liquidated in 1979, allegedly for not paying taxes, thereby ending the marketing of AMC vehicles in Costa Rica.

=== Mexico ===
Matadors were built by Vehículos Automotores Mexicanos (VAM) in Mexico.

==== First generation ====
===== 1971 =====
Continuing the positioning of VAM's AMC Rebel, the Mexican-built Matadors were available only as a single trim level, in four-door sedan and two-door hardtop forms, for their introductory year. The hardtop retained the "Rambler Classic SST" name. The sedan changed from "Rambler Classic 770" to "Rambler Classic DPL". Both body styles saw the same features as the U.S 1971 AMC Matadors and were almost equal with only a few exclusive characteristics for each.

Standard equipment consisted of four-wheel manual drum brakes, manual steering, 170 bhp (127 kW; 172 PS) gross at 4,600 rpm 252 cu in (4.1 L) I6 engine with Carter WCD two-barrel carburetor and 9.5:1 compression ratio, fully synchronized three-speed manual transmission with column shift, 10-inch heavy-duty clutch, 3.54:1 rear differential gear ratio with manual transmission, 3.07:1 rear differential gear ratio with automatic transmission, electric two-speed wipers, electric washers, rectangular full-length 200 km/h (124 mph) speedometer, electric analog clock, collapsible steering column with built-in ignition switch, luxury custom steering wheel, courtesy lights, cigarette lighter, dashboard ashtray, locking glove box, wide individual front seats (hardtop), front bench seat (sedan), two-point front seatbelts, front and rear side armrests, dual rear ashtrays, single round dome light (sedan), dual C-pillar dome lights (hardtop), dual coat hooks, bright molding package, luxury wheel covers, and driver's side remote mirror. Optional equipment included power drum brakes (standard with automatic transmission), power steering, heavy-duty suspension, automatic transmission, heater with front defroster, vinyl roof, remote-controlled passenger-side mirror, bumper guards, bumper tubes, and a locking gas cap.

===== 1972 =====
For 1972, all VAM cars received the same revisions and improvements as AMC's U.S.-built models. The Classic line saw upgrades replacing the 252 cu in (4.1 L) I6 with the 282 cu in (4.6 L) I6 producing 200 bhp (149 kW; 203 PS) at 4,400 rpm with a Carter ABD two-barrel carburetor, 9.5 compression ratio, and a 266-degree camshaft. Power brakes with front disks became standard equipment regardless of transmission; a Chrysler A998 three-speed automatic transmission replaced the older Borg-Warner automatics; heavy-duty suspension with a front sway bar; an improved heater with revised controls placed to the right of the steering column; and a new two-round-pod instrument cluster. The seat patterns and side panels were updated, as were the new wheel covers and grille designs.

Since its redesign in 1970, the hardtop body style began to decline in sales, and the 1971 front-end facelift did not help reverse the trend. However, VAM did not want to discontinue the body style as it would not have a mid-sized two-door offering.

The model was reworked into an all-new limited edition with a sportier focus for 1972 and featuring more appointments similar to a personal luxury car. This became the VAM Classic Brougham, with the name "Rambler" removed to rejuvenate the line, while the four-door sedan became the VAM Classic DPL. The Brougham included as standard equipment power steering, three-speed automatic transmission with a floor-mounted shifter (the same unit as the U.S. Rebel Machine models), a center console with locking compartment (also shared with the Rebel Machine), individual high-back bucket seats (shared with the VAM Javelin), bright trim for pedals, heater, AM/FM stereo radio with four speakers, tinted windshield, and a remote-controlled driver's side remote mirror.

Despite the marketing and high level of equipment, the public saw it as the previous model. The only external differences from the earlier model were the colors, grille, standard vinyl roof, and wheel covers. The price was higher than that of the Rambler Classic SST, and it did not increase sales for the year, ending below VAM's expectations.

The VAM Classic Brougham is the closest Mexican equivalent to the AMC Rebel Machine and the Go Package-equipped Matador sold in the U.S. and Canada. It is considered the most collectible Matador/Rebel model produced in Mexico.

===== 1973 =====
Because of low sales of the Classic Brougham hardtop, the Classic DPL four-door sedan became the only Matador model produced by VAM in 1973, with the Javelin as the largest two-door model offered by the company. The 1973 Classic DPLs were virtually the same as their counterparts the previous year, with differences only in the seat and side panel designs, the grille design, and a new engine head with larger valves and independent rockers.

==== Second generation ====
===== 1974 =====
The generational change AMC Matadors received for 1974 in the United States was also introduced in Mexico. This meant a new front-end design with the "coffin nose" elongated central portion and single headlights, new horizontal tail light designs, a rear license plate mount on the back panel instead of the bumper, and a new dashboard with squared dials and a full-length padded surface. Further changes included bumper designs with the five-mile-per-hour impact-absorption system. This meant the only case (alongside the Pacer) of a VAM car incorporating this safety measure, which the Mexican government did not mandate, making VAM Classics exceed the safety regulations of its time. Sedan units ordered with the automatic transmission regularly included the power steering system and a heater at no extra cost. The beginning of automotive engine emission certification in Mexico affected the 282 cu in (4.6 L) six, which changed to a lower 8.5:1 compression ratio.

==== Coupe ====
VAM launched the new two-door model, AMC's Matador coupe. Unlike all previous (Matador and Rebel) mid-size models, it was available in two different trim levels: the sporty "Classic AMX" (equivalent to the AMC Matador X) and the luxury-focused "Classic Brougham" (equivalent to the AMC Matador Brougham coupe). Both versions were mechanically the same, carrying the same technical specifications as the Classic DPL models. Their main differences were in appearance, trims, and standard features.

The Classic Brougham featured a vinyl roof cover, new wheel covers, and "Brougham" emblems on the C-pillars. Included were a custom sports steering wheel, a column-mounted shifter, a fold-down split-back bench seat, and an AM radio. Unlike the Classic DPL, the Classic AMX and the Classic Brougham included automatic transmission, power steering, and heater as standard equipment.

The Classic AMX featured VAM's in-house five-spoke wheels with volcano center caps and trim rings, a blacked-out grille, and a rally stripe surrounding the entire length of the car with an integrated AMX emblem on the right corner of the trunk lid. The Classic AMX included a three-spoke sports steering wheel, high-back fold-down individual bucket seats, a center console with a locking compartment, a floor-mounted gearshift that continued the Javelin's U-shaped design, and an AM/FM radio. This model was positioned to replace the Javelin as VAM's top-of-the-line performance model and to serve as the image builder.

===== 1975 =====
For 1975, changes in all three VAM Classic versions were few.

The Classic DPL received a new one-piece grille with rectangular parking lights, following the U.S.-made versions, and new seats and door panels. The luxury steering wheel gained a new design for the Classic DPL and the Classic Brougham.

Both coupe models obtained new interior door panels with AMC's full-length X-model side armrests; the panels of the sports version also carried an etched "AMX" emblem over the vinyl near the top front corner of the door. The Classic AMX also featured AMC's X-model floor-mounted shifter design.

All three versions shared upgrades, including electronic ignition, a vacuum gauge in place of the electric clock, a 282 cu in (4.6 L) I6 with a lower 7.7:1 compression ratio, and a Holley 2300 two-barrel carburetor. The rear differential gear ratio was changed to 3.31:1 for both transmissions. A significant update was that the power steering pump and alternator positions were reversed, with the former now at the intake side and the latter at the distributor's side. This change also incorporated a new water pump design.

===== 1976 =====
Additional changes were incorporated for the 1976 model year. The Classic DPL and Brougham featured a new wheel-cover design. Both coupe models obtained a new grille design divided into two portions with squared parking lights. The Classic AMX had a new and more discreet side decal covering only the front fenders. It started near the A-pillar, running to the top of the side marker light in two tones, with a painted "AMX" emblem. The loss of the rear portion of the side decal meant a new metal "AMX" emblem was placed in the right corner of the trunk lid. Unlike previous years, the 1976 Classic AMX blurred the line between sporty and luxury models. The side panel designs and seats looked luxurious instead of sporty. Several units had wheel covers as standard, instead of trim rings and regular hubcaps, and some also had the clock instead of the vacuum gauge. What made them sporty was mainly the side armrests, steering wheel, individual seat configuration, floor-mounted shifter, and center console.

All three versions shared a new 160 km/h speedometer, tinted windshield, and seat designs based on AMC's Oleg Cassini units for the Matador coupes. These were color-keyed with the rest of the interior and shared by all three versions, unlike under AMC, where they were only on the Brougham coupe. A unique feature was the seats in the AMX, which were individual and included adjustable headrests with Cassini crests and reclining mechanisms (for the first time in VAM cars since 1972). The Classic DPL featured a fixed front bench seat, while the Classic Brougham had a split-folding rear bench seat. This model (as well as the 1976 VAM Pacer) is the only VAM car to come close to the various U.S. AMC designer cars. This interior design was not an optional package, but a standard factory feature. The AMC Oleg Cassini models' copper accents (except for the buttons) and exterior trim were not used on the VAM Classics (and Pacers). The Mexican Cassini package was primarily focused on seat and side panel designs (interior-only).

===== Repositioning =====
VAM was looking forward to introducing the Pacer model to the Mexican market. The new car would be its fourth product line. However, Mexican legislation at the time allowed only three platforms per marque. Having the Classic and the Pacer in the luxury market segment would have also caused internal competition. VAM favored the new Pacer over its flagship model. External factors also played a role in this decision, as the full-size car market in Mexico was in a downturn. The Classic line was discontinued in the middle of the 1976 model year. Starting in 1977, VAM's most luxurious model was the Pacer, and its largest models became the Americans (AMC's U.S.-market Hornets).

== International exports ==
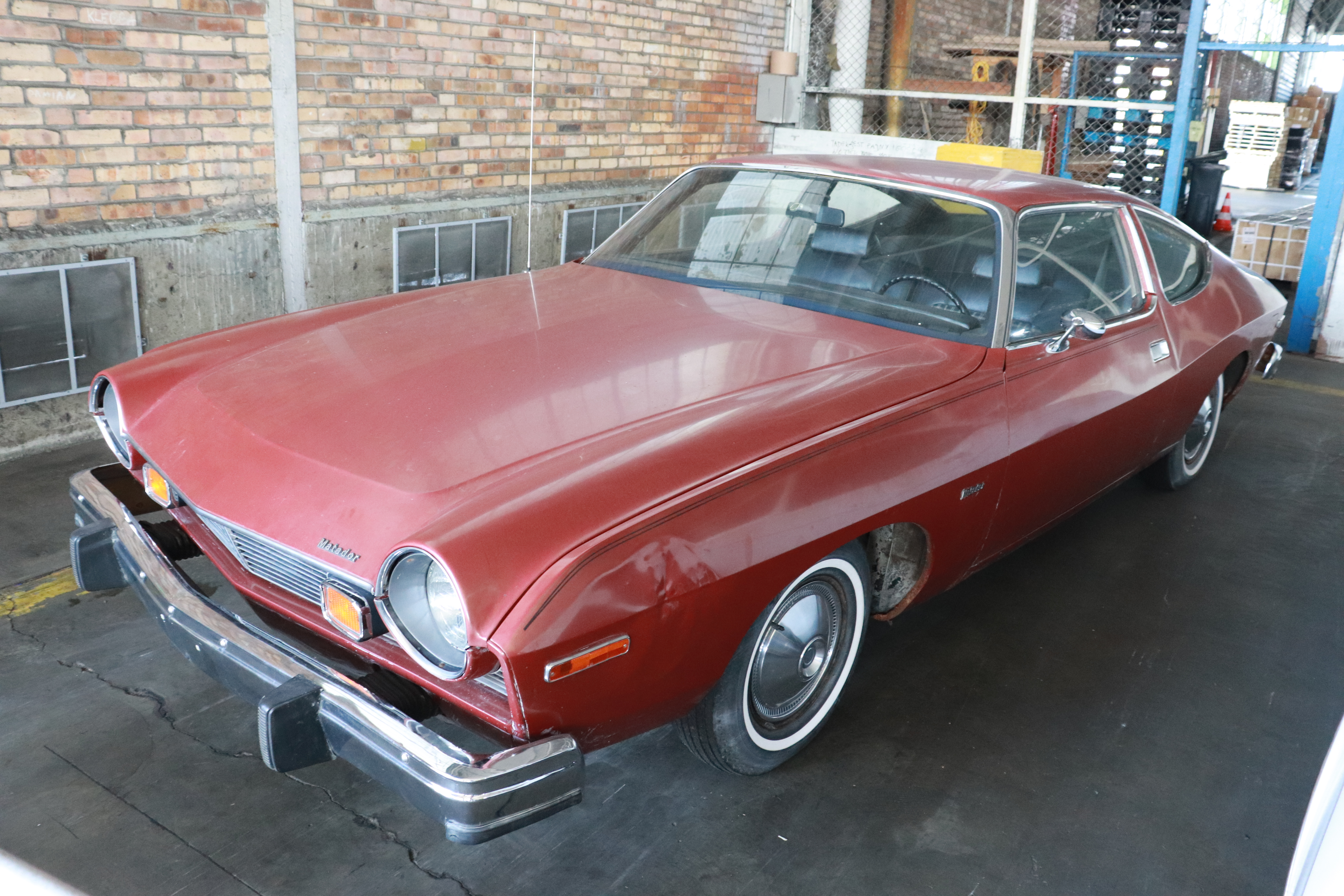
AMC Matador coupe exported to Poland

=== Canada ===
The Brampton Assembly Plant in Ontario, Canada had been building Rambler and AMC vehicles since 1962, including the Ambassador (until 1968) and Rebel (until 1970). However, the plant did not make the Matador which replaced the Rebel. The facility assembled AMC's smaller Hornet and Gremlin models through 1978 and then Jeeps, Concords, and Eagles through the 1992 model year. Canadian-market Matadors were instead made at Kenosha and exported to Canada from the United States. Some parts used in the U.S. and foreign-built Matadors, including engine blocks, interior trim, and plastic components such as tail light and park light lenses, were made in Canada.

=== Finland ===
Rambler and AMC vehicles were imported from Kenosha into Finland by two major Finnish companies from the 1950s until the late 1960s, after which Wihuri Group, a sizeable multi-sector family business, took over import operations using its shipping operation, Autola Oy, which Wihuri had brought in 1954. First and second-generation Matadors were imported along with Hornet and Javelin. As with all AMC export markets, the models were marketed as "Rambler" in Finland. Imports of the Matador continued until 1975.

=== France ===
Jean Charles Automobiles imported several lines of AMC and Jeep vehicles to France, including a small number of Matador sedans and station wagons. They are identified by a stamped plate affixed to the body.

=== Norway ===
Matadors were imported into Norway during the 1970s by Norwegian importer Kolberg & Caspary AS located at Ås, Norway. Kolberg & Caspary was formed in 1906 and imported automotive, industrial, and construction products.

Matadors, Javelins, and Hornets were sold by Gavas Motors AS in Oslo and Hasco Motors AS in Drammen.

=== United Kingdom ===
Hudson motor vehicles had been assembled in the United Kingdom since 1926 at the Hudson plant in Chiswick, West London. After the merger of Nash and Hudson to form American Motors, the facility became an importer of AMC vehicles. It continued as a service center for Hudson and AMC vehicles. The U.K. operation was renamed Rambler Motors (A.M.C) Limited. As with all AMC's export markets, the Rambler name was thereafter used on all AMC vehicles sold in the U.K.

A few Matador sedans and wagons were sold in the U.K. alongside the Ambassador in hardtop and station wagon versions, as well as the Javelin pony car. Except for the Javelin, both the Matador and Ambassador models were exported from Kenosha with factory right-hand drive, as had been the case with the prior Rebel and Ambassador models imported into the U.K. None were locally assembled.

Unlike the Knock-down kits used for Australian assembly, which continued to use the RHD version of the 1967 Ambassador dash, cluster, and Weather Eye (albeit to the right of the cluster for the second-generation models), U.K. second-generation Matadors were factory-built with the temperature controls of the U.S. versions (positioned underneath and to the left of the instrument dials). The U.K. models also received a locally built and fitted "walnut burr" fascia that replaced the U.S. market black plastic cluster surround, as had been the practice for previous U.K.-market Rebels and Ambassadors.

The final 1977 models for the U.K. market were regular LHD versions.

== Discontinuation ==
By the late 1970s, the American automotive landscape was undergoing a seismic shift, with consumer preferences veering sharply towards smaller, more fuel-efficient vehicles. The era of large, gas-guzzling automobiles was waning, as the 1973 oil crisis and persistent double-digit inflation made fuel economy and affordability paramount concerns for American families. Car shoppers who were obsessed with horsepower and speed, quickly pivoted to knowing how many miles they could get out of a gallon of gas. Reducing emissions neutered performance and fuel shortages meant waiting in line at the gas pumps. The AMC Matador, a large car, became increasingly out of step with the evolving market, as consumers sought more economical alternatives.

American Motors, grappling with limited financial resources, could not comprehensively redesign its large-sized models. The AMC Ambassador was discontinued after the 1974 model year, and the Matador followed suit after 1978, coinciding with Ford's downsizing its full-size models. The introduction of the downsized 1977 Chevrolet Impala further exacerbated the decline of legacy intermediates from AMC and Chrysler, signaling a broader trend towards smaller, more efficient vehicles.

The automaker's response to the shrinking large car market was the introduction of the AMC Concord for the 1978 model year. The Concord represented an upmarket restyling and repositioning of the compact AMC Hornet, sharing the same 108-inch (2,743 mm) wheelbase as the redesigned 1978 Chevrolet Malibu. The Concord was marketed as a vehicle combining an "easy-to-handle size with a roomy sumptuous interior," in stark contrast to the polarizing Matador coupe, the Concord's "overall styling was pleasant...would not offend anyone." The new Concord models debuted AMC's first complete line of economical, compact-sized cars offering luxurious trim, features, and comfort levels previously exclusive to larger automobiles.

The discontinuation of the Matador marked the end of AMC's presence in the traditional large car segment for nearly a decade. The automaker did not re-enter this market until the introduction of the Eagle Premier, a product of AMC's partnership with Renault. The full-sized four-door sedan was introduced to the marketplace following the purchase of AMC by Chrysler in 1987. The new Premier represented a new direction for the former AMC, showcasing a more modern, European-influenced design and engineering, reflecting the evolving automotive landscape of the late 1980s.
