= Ford Mustang (first generation) =

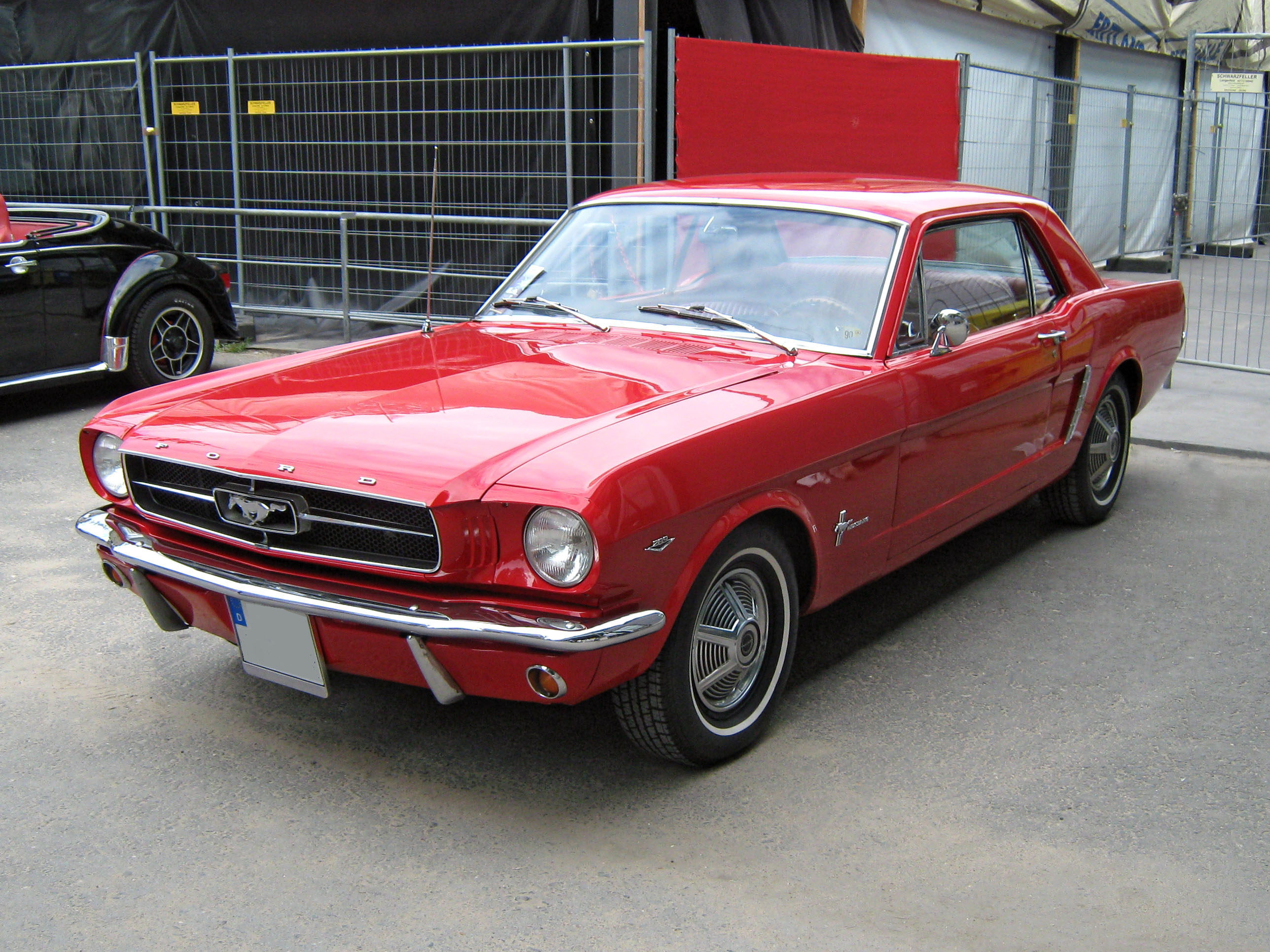
- 1965 Ford Mustang

Overview
- Manufacturer: Ford
- Also called: Ford T5 (Germany)
- Production: March 1964 – June 1973
- Model years: 1965–1973
- Assembly: United States: Dearborn, Michigan (Ford River Rouge Complex); Milpitas, California (San Jose Assembly Plant); Edison, New Jersey (Edison Assembly); Australia: Homebush (Homebush Assembly Plant, conversion to right hand drive); Mexico: Mexico City (La Villa Assembly); Netherlands: Amsterdam (Amsterdam Assembly); Peru: Lima (Ford Peru); Venezuela: Valencia (Valencia Assembly)
- Designer: Gale Halderman

Body and chassis
- Class: Pony car; Muscle car
- Body style: 2-door hardtop; 2-door fastback; 2-door convertible
- Layout: Front-engine, rear-wheel-drive
- Related: Ford Falcon; Mercury Cougar; Mercury Comet; Ford Ranchero

Chronology
- Successor: Ford Mustang II

The first-generation Ford Mustang was manufactured by Ford from March 1964 until 1973. The introduction of the Mustang created a new class of automobiles known as pony cars. The Mustang's styling, with its long hood and short deck, proved wildly popular and inspired a host of competition.

It was introduced on April 17, 1964, as a hardtop and convertible, with the fastback version following in August 1964. Upon introduction, the Mustang, sharing its platform with the Falcon, was slotted into the compact car segment.

The first-generation Mustangs grew in overall dimensions and engine power with each revision. The 1971 model featured a drastic redesign. After an initial surge, sales steadily declined, and Ford began working on a new generation Mustang. With the onset of the 1973 oil crisis, Ford was prepared, having already designed the smaller Mustang II for the 1974 model year. This new car shared no components with preceding models.

== Conception and styling ==
As Lee Iacocca's assistant general manager and chief engineer, Donald N. Frey was the head engineer for the Mustang project — supervising the development of the Mustang in a record 18 months from September 1962 to April 1964. — while Iacocca himself championed the project as Ford Division general manager.

Drawing on inspiration from the mid-engined Ford Mustang I concept vehicle, Lee Iacocca ordered the development of a new "small car" to vice-president of design at Ford, Eugene Bordinat.

Bordinat tasked Ford's three design studios (Ford, Lincoln-Mercury, and Advanced Design) to create proposals for the new vehicle.

The design teams had been given five goals for the design of the Mustang: It would seat four, have bucket seats and a floor-mounted shifter, weigh no more than 2,500 pounds (1,100 kg), be no more than 180 inches (5 m) in length, sell for less than US$2,500 (equivalent to $25,952 in 2025), and have multiple power, comfort, and luxury options.

== Design ==
The Ford design studio ultimately produced the winning design in the intramural contest, under Project Design Chief Joe Oros and his team of L. David Ash, Gale Halderman, John Foster, and George Schumaker. This design was called the Cougar by the design team.

Oros states:

I then called a meeting with all the Ford studio designers. We talked about the sporty car for most of that afternoon, setting parameters for what it should look like — and what it should not look like — by making lists on a large pad, a technique I adapted from the management seminar. We taped the lists up all around the studio to keep ourselves on track. We also had photographs of all the previous sporty cars that had been done in the Corporate Advanced studio as a guide to themes or ideas that were tired or not acceptable to management. Within a week we had hammered out a new design. We cut templates and fitted them to the clay model that had been started. We cut right into it, adding or deleting clay to accommodate our new theme, so it wasn't like starting all over. But we knew Lincoln-Mercury would have two models. And Advanced would have five, some they had previously shown and modified, plus a couple extras. But we would only have one model because Ford studio had a production schedule for a good many facelifts and other projects. We couldn't afford the manpower, but we made up for lost time by working around the clock so our model would be ready for the management review.

In a 2004 interview, Oros recalls the planning behind the design:

I told the team that I wanted the car to appeal to women, but I wanted men to desire it, too. I wanted a Ferrari-like front end, the motif centered on the front — something heavy-looking like a Maseratti [sic], but, please, not a trident — and I wanted air intakes on the side to cool the rear brakes. I said it should be as sporty as possible and look like it was related to European design.

=== David Ash ===
L. David Ash is often credited with the actual styling of the Mustang. Ash, in a 1985 interview speaking of the origin of the Mustang design, when asked the degree of his contribution, said:

I would say substantial. However, anyone that says they designed the car by themselves, is wrong. Iacocca didn't design it. He conceived it. He's called the father of it, and, in that respect, he was. I did not design it in total, nor did Oros. It was designed by a design group. You look at the photograph taken at the award banquet for the Industrial Designers' Society where the Mustang received the medal; it's got Damon Woods in it (the group that did the interior), and Charlie Phaneuf (who was with Damon), and it's got myself and John Foster (who was with me), it's got (John) Najjar in it.

So nobody actually did the car, as such. Iacocca in his book flat out comes and says I did the car. It's right there in print, "It's Dave Ash's Mustang." Bordinat will tell you I did the car. This book tells you I did the car, but, in actual fact, I had a lot of help, and I don't think anyone ever does a car by himself, not in these times anyway.

=== Gale Halderman ===
Gale Halderman, in a 2002 interview with Collectible Automobile, spoke of the Mustang's evolution through the Ford design studio:

Dave Ash had started a clay model of the car. He had this very boxy, very stiff-looking car. Joe came back from a management conference, saw it, and said, "No, no, no, we're not going to do that!" That's when he came to me… he said, "…we've just been given an assignment by [Gene] Bordinat to do a proposal on a small car that Lee [Iacocca] wants to build. We've got to do one, and I want you to work on that project." I went home and sketched some cars, and I took about five or six sketches with me the next morning and put them up on the board.

We must have put 25 sketches on the board that morning, because Joe assigned three or four of us to do designs. Joe picked one of the sketches I did at home to be clay modeled… so we actually started over on [Dave Ash's] clay model with the theme from one of my designs, which had scoops on the sides and the hop-up quarter lines.

To decrease developmental costs, the Mustang used chassis, suspension, and drivetrain components derived from the Ford Falcon and Fairlane. It used a unitized platform-type frame from the 1964 Falcon and welded box-section side rails, including welded crossmembers. Although hardtop Mustangs accounted for the highest sales, durability problems with the new frame led to the engineering of a convertible first, which ensured adequate stiffness. The overall length of the Mustang and Falcon was identical, although the Mustang's wheelbase was slightly shorter. With an overall width of 68.2 in (1,732 mm), it was 2.4 in (61 mm) narrower, yet the wheel track was nearly identical. Shipping weight, approximately 2,570 lb (1,170 kg) with the straight six-cylinder engine, was similar to the Falcon. A fully equipped V8 model weighed approximately 3,000 lb (1,360 kg). Although most of the mechanical parts were from the Falcon, the Mustang's body was completely different, including a shorter wheelbase, lower seating position, and lower overall height. An industry first, the "torque box" was an innovative structural system that stiffened the Mustang's construction and helped contribute to better handling.

Gale Haldeman spoke of the engineering and design of the car in his interview, stating:

No one knew the Mustang was going to be as popular as it was, but it created a huge stir in the company. Everybody just loved it, even the engineers, though we must have bent 75 in-house engineering and manufacturing rules. The Mustang had the first floating bumpers. The whole front end was a die-casting with a floating hood.

There were so many things the engineers said we shouldn't be doing, but they didn't want to change them either. There was so much enthusiasm right from the beginning. Even the drivers at the test track loved it. We would go there for meetings, and the crowds of people around it were huge. That was totally unusual, so we suspected the Mustang was going to be a hit.

The idea for a fastback originated with Joe Oros as well and was designed in Charlie Phaneuf's studio. Haldeman recalls:

We did it in secret. No one, including [Hal] Sperlich or Iacocca, saw it until it was finished. We cast it in fiberglass, painted it bright red, and then showed it to Iacocca. He said, "We've got to do it!"

An additional four-door model was designed by Dave Ash as a clay model, but was not considered.

== 1964½–1966 ==
Mustang 1964½–1966
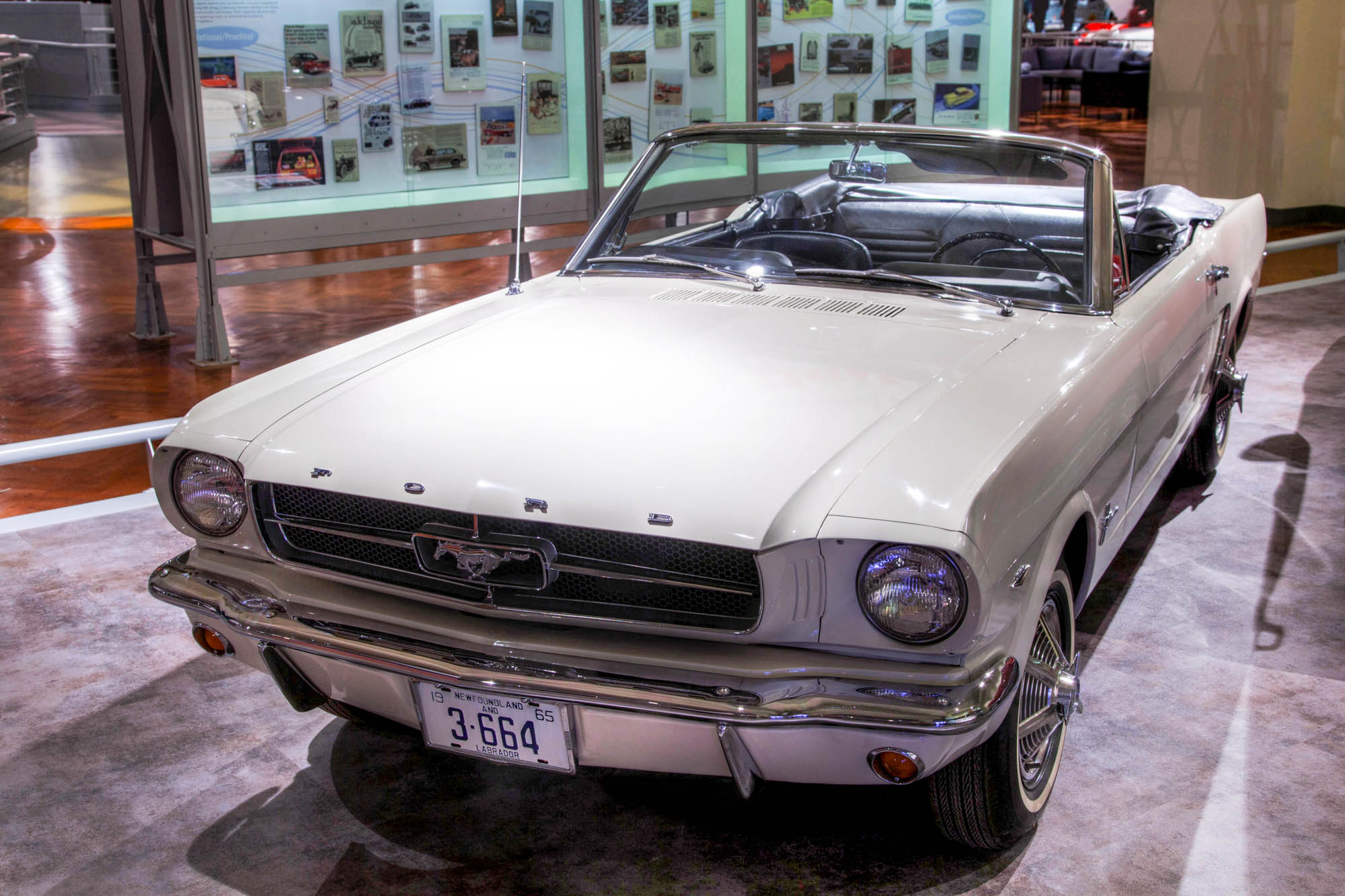
- 1964½ Mustang convertible serial No. 1

Overview
- Production: April 1964 – July 1964 (1964½ series); August 1964 – July 1965 (1965 series); August 1965 – July 1966 (1966 series)
- Assembly: United States: Dearborn, Michigan (Ford River Rouge Complex); Milpitas, California (San Jose Assembly Plant); Edison, New Jersey (Edison Assembly); Mexico: Mexico City (La Villa Assembly); Venezuela: Valencia (Valencia Assembly)
- Designer: Joe Oros; David Ash; Gale Haldeman; Charlie Phaneuf (fastback); Philip T. Clark (Mustang I concept); John Najjar (Mustang I concept)

Body and chassis
- Body style: 2-door hardtop; 2-door fastback; 2-door convertible
- Related: 1965–1966 Shelby Mustang G.T.350

Powertrain
- Engine: 170 cu in (2.8 L) Thriftpower I6; 200 cu in (3.3 L) Thriftpower I6; 260 cu in (4.3 L) small block V8; 289 cu in (4.7 L) small block V8; 289 cu in (4.7 L) small block HiPo V8
- Transmission: 3-speed manual; 4-speed manual; 3-speed automatic

Dimensions
- Wheelbase: 108 in (2,743 mm)
- Length: 181.6 in (4,613 mm)
- Width: 68.2 in (1,732 mm)
- Height: 51.2 in (1,300 mm)
- Curb weight: 2,445 lb (1,109 kg) (base)

Since it was introduced four months before the usual start of the 1965 production year and manufactured alongside 1964 Ford Falcons and 1964 Mercury Comets, the earliest Mustangs are widely referred to as the "1964½" model by enthusiasts. Nevertheless, all 1964½ cars were given 1965 U.S. standard VINs at the time of production, and—with limited exception to the earliest of promotional materials—were marketed by Ford as 1965 models. The low-end model hardtop used a "U-code" 170 cu in (2.8 L) straight-6 engine shared with the Falcon, as well as a three-speed manual transmission, and retailed for US$2,368 (equivalent to $24,582 in 2025). Standard equipment for the early 1965 Mustangs included black front lap belts, a glove box light, and a padded dashboard. Production began on March 9, 1964. Mustang Serial Number One (5F08F100001 from the pre-production batch) was sold on April 14, 1964, at the George Parsons Ford dealership in St. John's, Newfoundland, Canada. Official introduction followed on April 17 at the 1964 World's Fair. The V8 models were identified with a badge on the front fender that spelled out the engine's cubic inch displacement ("260" or "289") over a wide "V." This emblem was identical to the one on the 1964 Fairlane.

Several changes to the Mustang occurred at the start of the "normal" 1965 model year in August 1964, about four months after its introduction. These cars are known as "late 65's". The engine lineup was changed, with a 200 cu in (3.3 L) "T-code" engine that produced 120 hp (89 kW). Production of the Fairlane's "F-code" 260 cu in (4.3 L) engine ceased when the 1964 model year ended. It was replaced with a new 200 hp (150 kW) "C-code" 289 cu in (4.7 L) engine with a two-barrel carburetor as the base V8. An "A-code" 225 hp (168 kW) four-barrel carbureted version was next in line, followed by the unchanged 289 HiPo "K-code" equipped with a 4-barrel Autolite 4100 carburetor that was rated at 271 hp (202 kW) at 6000 rpm and 312 lb⋅ft (423 N⋅m) at 3400 rpm. The DC electrical generator was replaced by a new AC alternator on all Fords (a way to distinguish 1964 production from the 1965s is to check if the alternator light on the dash reads "GEN" or "ALT").

=== GT Equipment Group ===
The Mustang GT version was introduced as the "GT Equipment Package" and included a V8 engine (most often the 225 hp, 168 kW "289"), grille-mounted fog lamps, rocker-panel stripes, and disc brakes. In the interior, the GT option added a different instrument panel that included a speedometer, fuel gauge, coolant temperature gauge, oil pressure gauge, and an amp meter in five round dials, but the gauges were not marked with numbers. A four-barrel carbureted engine was available with any body style. Additionally, reverse lights were an option added to the car from August 1964 production.

The Mustang was initially available in hardtop or convertible body styles, but a fastback model was considered during the car's early design phase. In 1965, the Shelby Mustang was introduced, available only in a newly introduced fastback body version with its swept-back rear glass and distinctive ventilation louvers. In 1965 Ford built 15,079 Mustangs that featured the GT Equipment Group. For 1966, Ford built 25,517 GTs. According to Jim Smart production guide, the fastback would have been the most common, followed by the coupe and then the convertible.

=== Options ===
The standard interior was available in various colors and features included adjustable driver and passenger bucket seats, an AM radio, and a floor-mounted shifter. Ford added additional interior options during the 1965 model year. The Interior Decor Group was popularly known as "Pony Interior" due to the addition of embossed running ponies on the seat fronts and included integral armrests, woodgrain appliqué accents, and a round gauge cluster that would replace the standard Falcon instrumentation. Options included sun visors, a (mechanical) remote-operated mirror, a floor console, and a bench seat. Ford later offered an under-dash air-conditioning unit and discontinued the vinyl with cloth insert seat upholstery that was available only in early 1965 models. The Rally-Pac was introduced in 1963 after Ford's success at that year's Monte Carlo Rally. Available on other Ford and Mercury compacts and intermediates, the Rally-Pac consisted of steering column mounted combination clock and tachometer. It was available as a factory-ordered option for $69.30. Installed by a dealer, the Rally-Pac was priced at $75.95. A 14-inch wheel option was available for Rally-Pac and GT350R vehicles widening front and rear track to 57.5 inches. A compass, rear seat belts, A/C, and backup lights were also optional.

A nationwide survey of owners by Popular Mechanics included many complaints about legroom. Fuel economy for the base V8 was good for the period, with a test by Popular Mechanics rating the optional 260 cubic inch engine with automatic transmission achieving 20.93 mpg_{‑US} (11.24 L/100 km; 25.14 mpg_{‑imp}) at a steady 60 mph (97 km/h). When equipped with the 289 "HiPo" engine and a 4.11 rear axle ratio, the 1965 Mustang achieved 0–60 mph (0–97 km/h) in 5.2 seconds and a 1/4 mile (402 m) time of 14.0 seconds at 100 mph (161 km/h).

The 1966 Mustang debuted with moderate trim changes including a new grille, side ornamentation, wheel covers, and gas cap. Ford's new C4 "Cruise-O-Matic" three-speed automatic transmission became available for the 225 hp V8. The 289 "HiPo" K-code engine was also offered with a C4 transmission, but it had stronger internals and can be identified by the servo's outer casing, which is marked with a 'C'. The long-duration solid-lifter camshaft that allowed the high-revving 289's horsepower rating, was not a good match for a low stall speed automatic torque converter. The "HiPo" could be identified by the 1-inch-thick (25 mm) vibration damper, (compared to 1/2 inch on the 225-hp version) and the absence of a vacuum advance unit on the dual point distributor. With the valve covers removed, a large letter "K" stamped is visible between the valve springs, along with screw-in studs (vs. a pressed-in stud for other 289s) for the adjustable rocker arms. Many new paint and interior color options were available, as well as an AM/eight-track sound system, and one of the first AM/FM mono automobile radios. The 1966 model year cars discontinued the Falcon instrument cluster, while the previously optional round gauges and padded sun visors became standard equipment. The Mustang would become the best-selling convertible in 1966, with 72,119 sold, beating the number two Impala by almost 2:1.

The 1965 and 1966 Mustangs are differentiated by variations in the exterior, despite the similar design. These variations include the cove molding on the rear quarter panels behind the doors. From August 1964 production, the molding was a single vertical piece of chrome, while for 1966 models, the molding was smaller in height and had three horizontal bars extending forward from the design, resembling an "E". The front intake grilles and ornaments were also different. The 1965 front grille used a "honeycomb" pattern, while the 1966 version was a "slotted" style. While both model years used the "Horse and Corral" emblem on the grille, the 1965's had four bars extending from each side of the corral, while these bars were removed for the 1966s. During the 1966 model year, a 'High Country Special' limited edition was available with 333 units sold in Colorado, Wyoming, and Nebraska.

When Ford wanted to introduce the Mustang in Germany, they discovered that the Krupp company had already registered the name for a truck. The German company offered to sell the rights for US$10,000. Ford refused and removed Mustang badges from exported units, instead, they named the cars T-5 (a pre-production Mustang project name) for the German market until 1979, when Krupp copyrights expired.

=== 1965 Mustang AWD prototype ===
In 1965, Harry Ferguson Research purchased three Mustang hardtops and converted them to 4x4 in an attempt to sell potential clients on their FF AWD system. A similar system was used in the Ferguson P99 Formula One race car, and would go on to be featured in the Jensen FF that is considered the first AWD non all-terrain passenger car. As in the Jensen FF, the AWD Mustangs also featured anti-lock braking that would later be known as ABS. The Dunlop Maxaret system was modified from its original use on airplanes.

=== 1966 Right-Hand-Drive Mustang ===
Ford Australia organized the importation and conversion of 1966 model year Mustangs to right-hand-drive (RHD) for the Australian market. This coincided with the launch of the new XR Falcon for 1966, which was marketed as the "Mustang-bred Falcon". The RHD Mustangs were called the "Ford Australia Delivered Mustang", and had compliance plates similar to the XR Falcon, to set the official conversion apart from the cottage industry versions. About 209 were imported by Ford Australia – 48 units were imported and converted in 1965 and a further 161 were prepared in 1966.

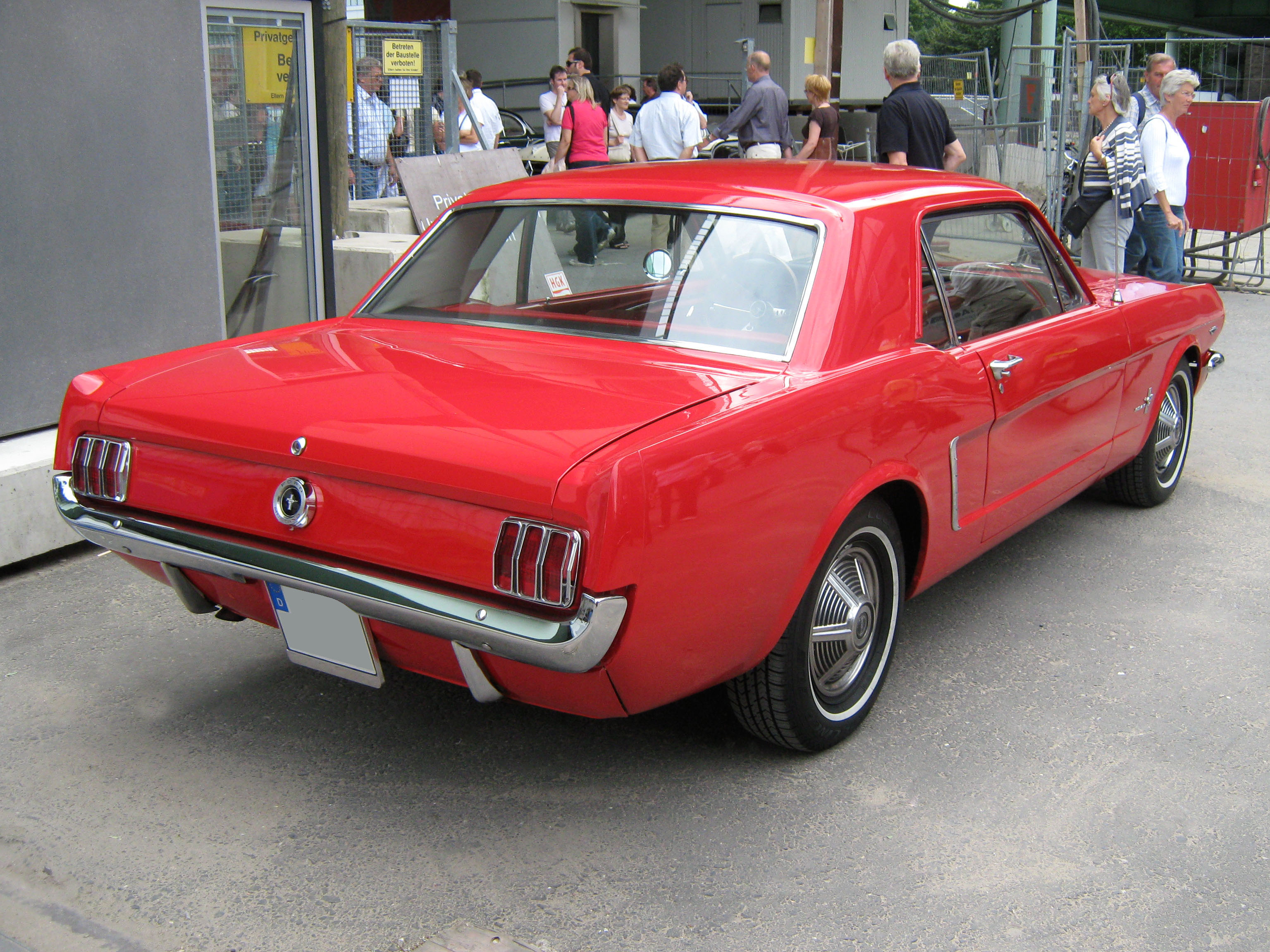
Hardtop

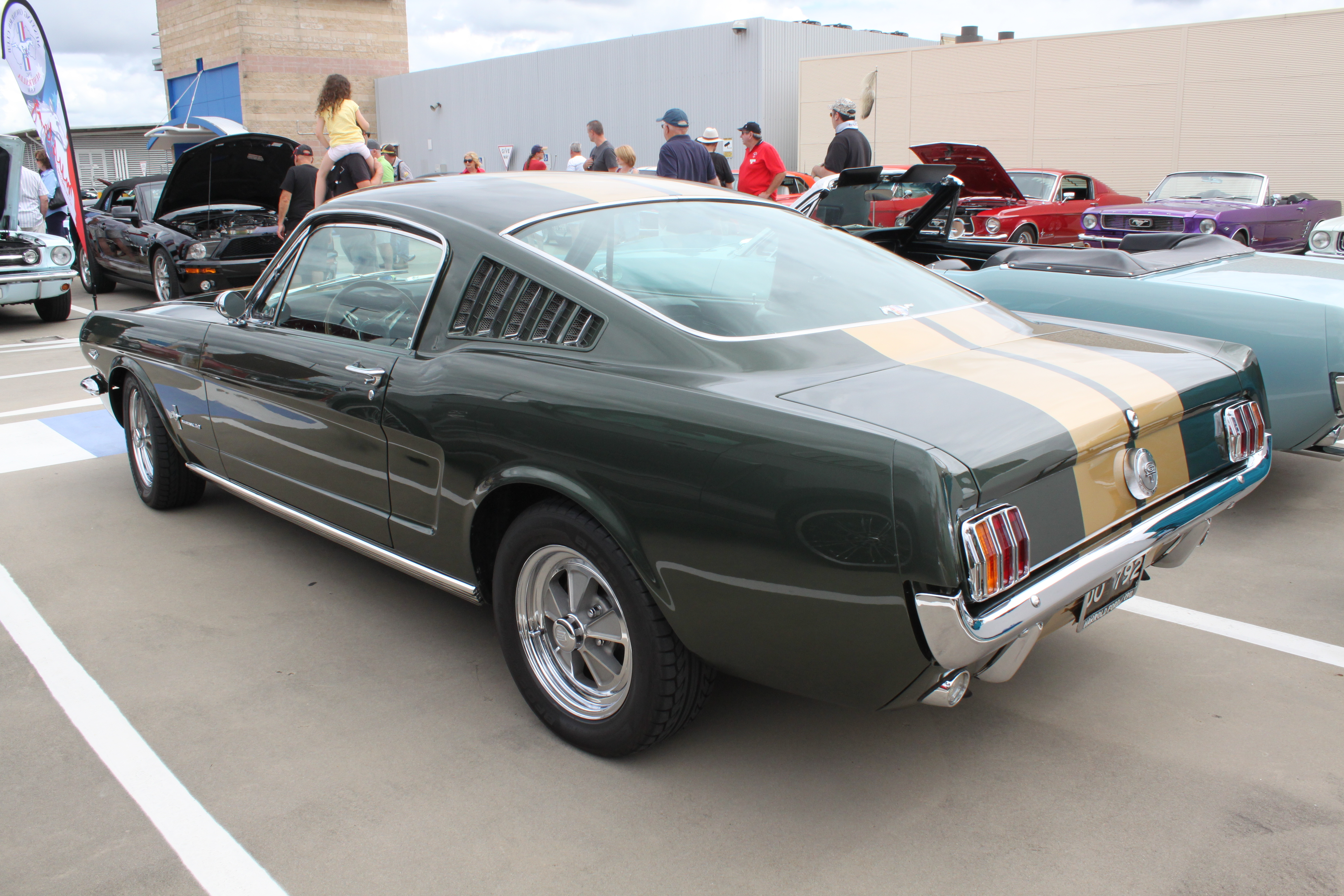
Fastback

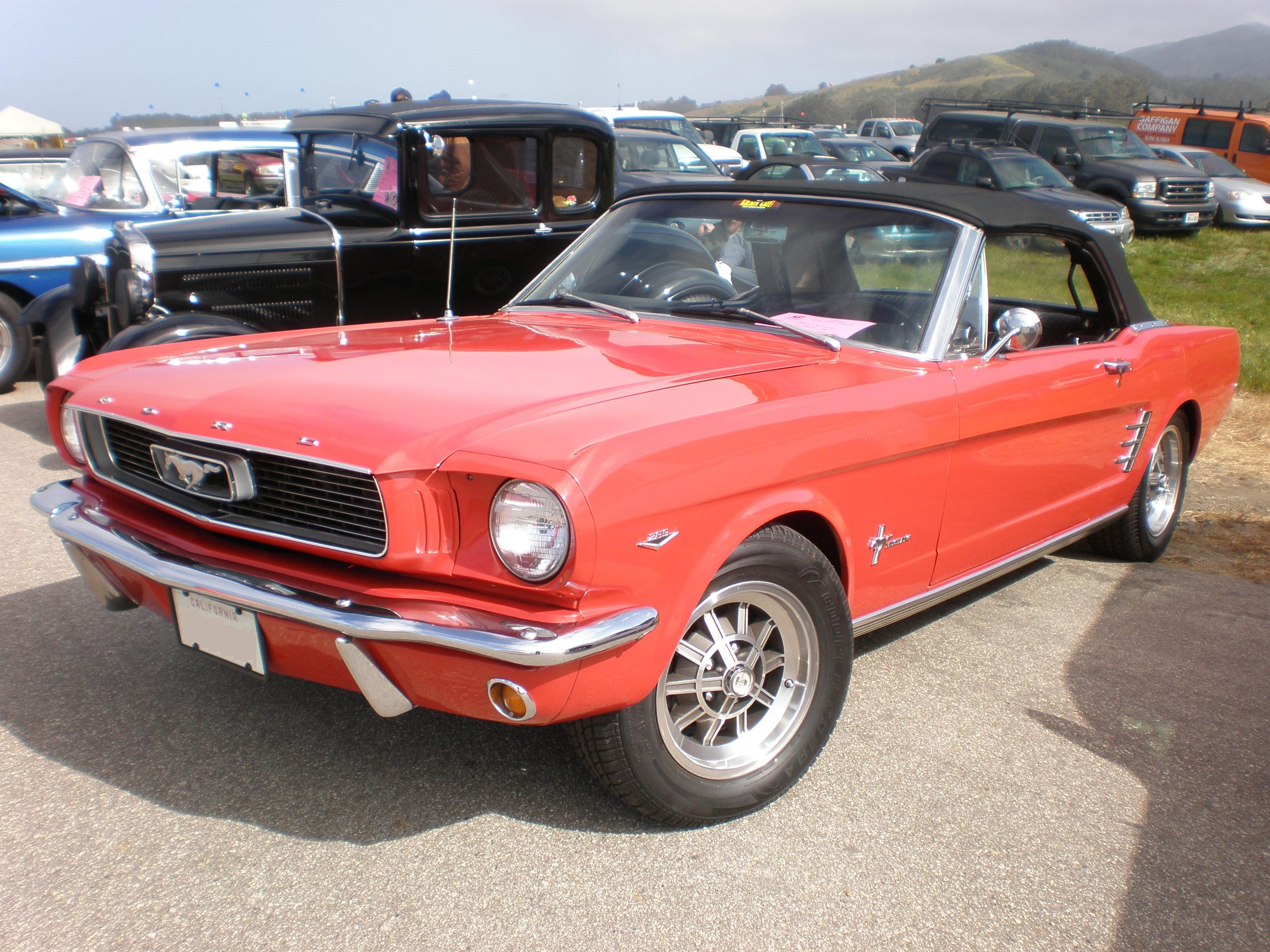
Convertible

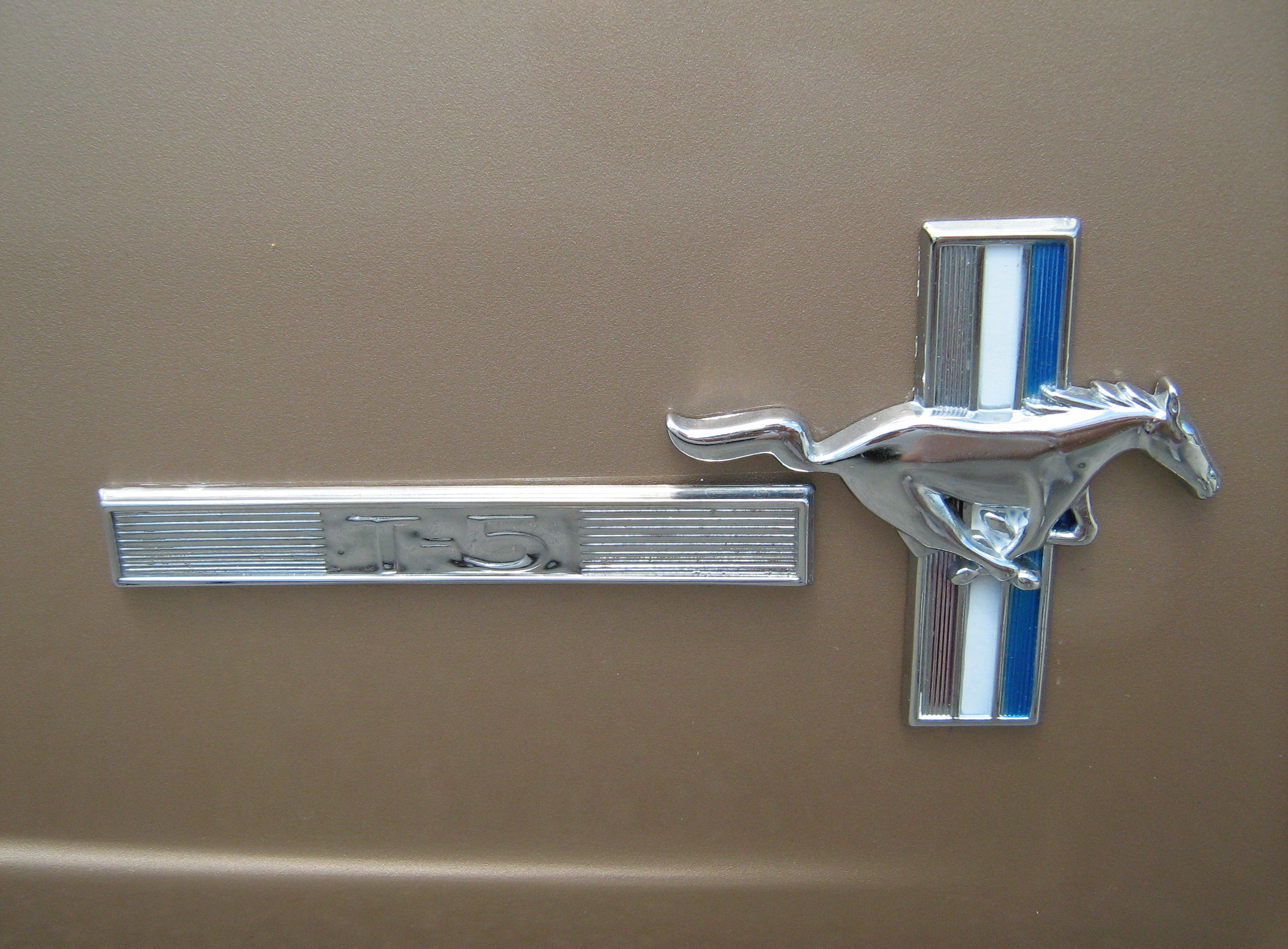
1966 Ford T-5 emblem

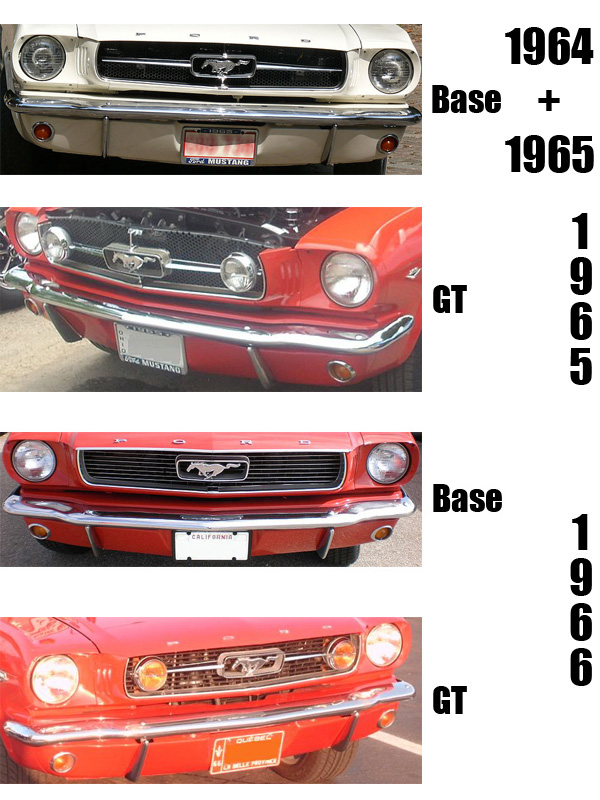
1965–1966 front end styles

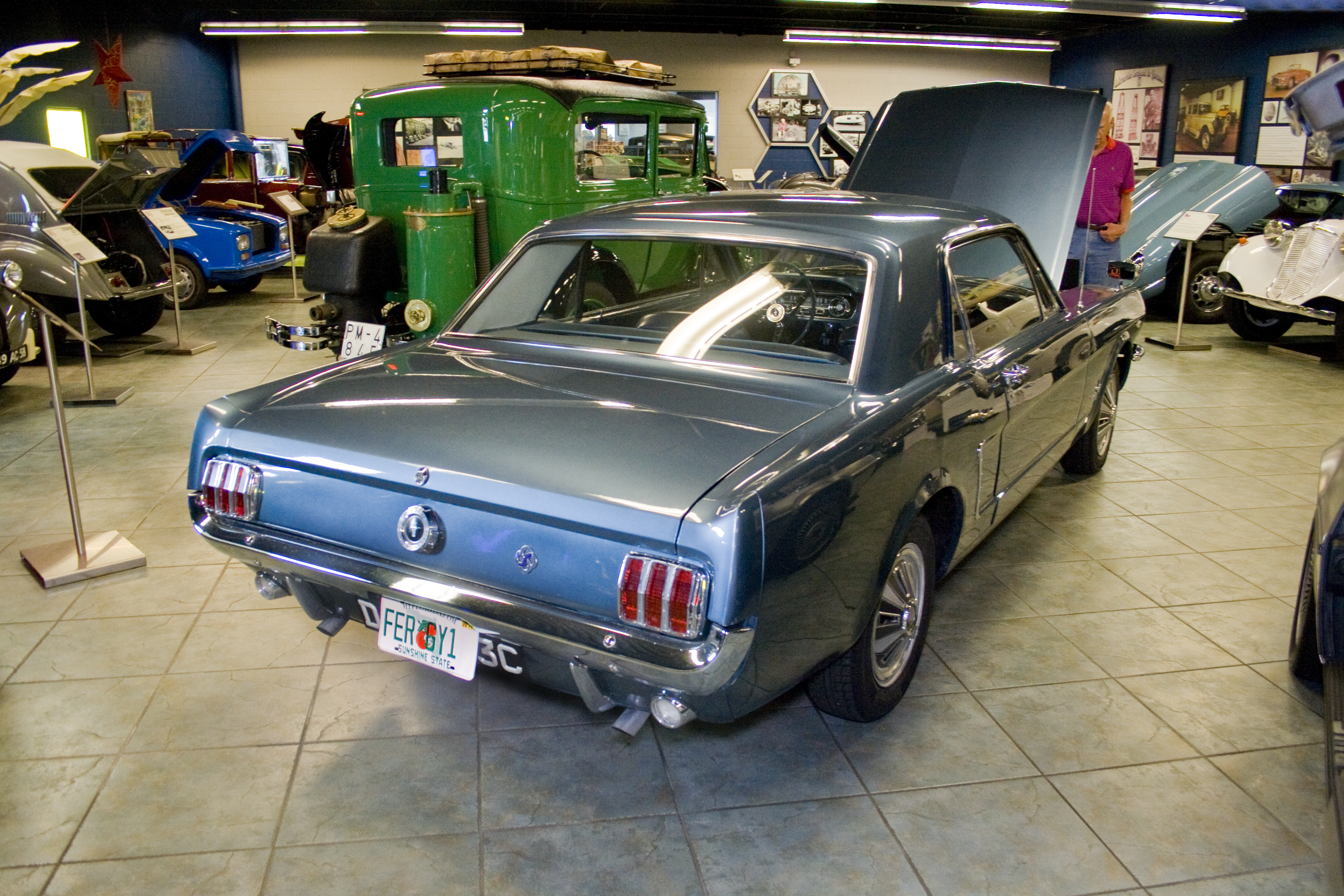
1965 Prototype with Ferguson AWD and ABS

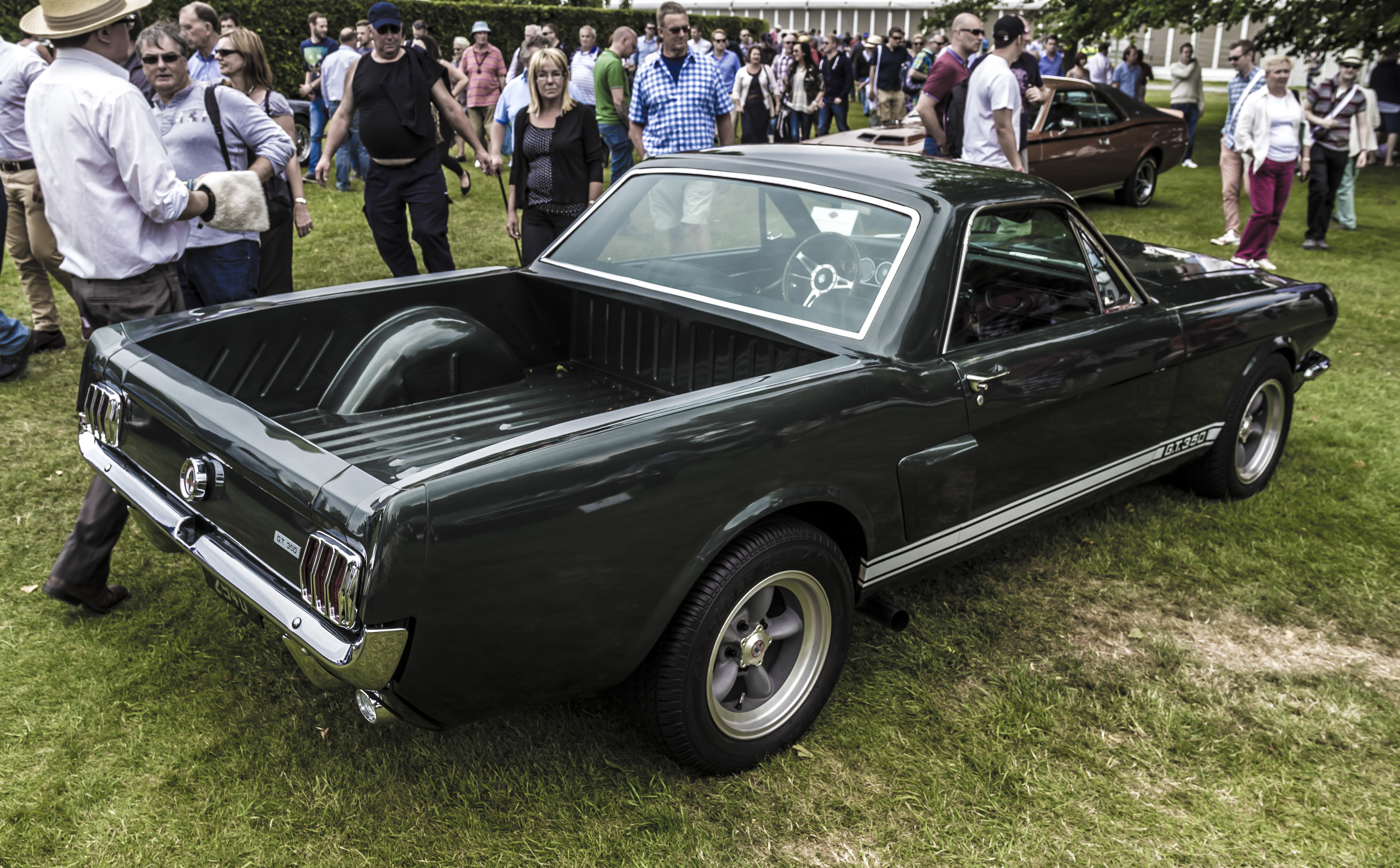
1966 Ford Mustang Mustero by Beverly Hills Ford

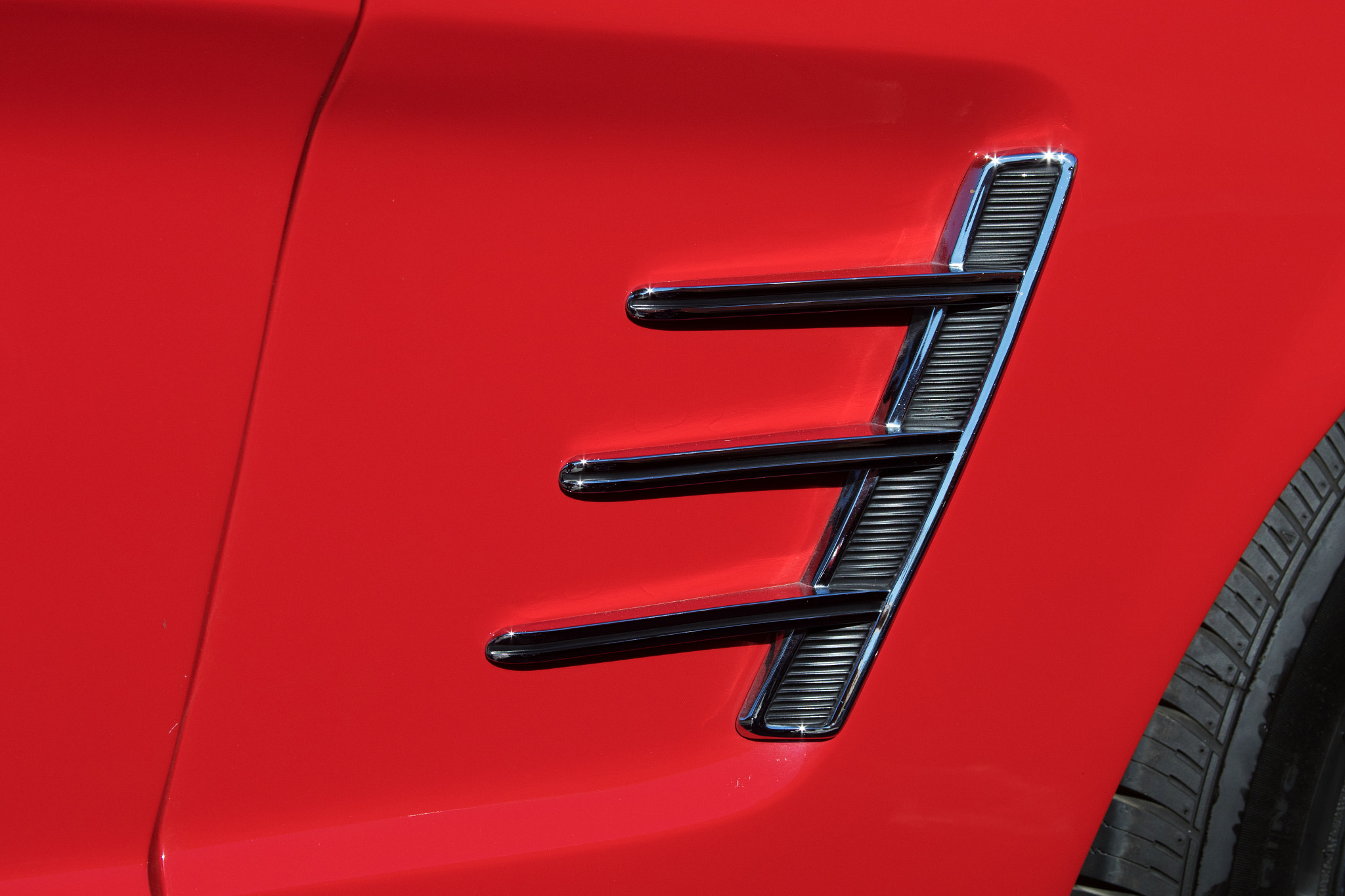
Reversed "E" chrome molding from a 1966 model

=== Engines ===
engine displacement, type, carburetor type	max. power at rpm	max. torque at rpm
170 cu in (2.8 L) Thriftpower I6 (1964) 1-barrel	105 bhp (78 kW) at 4,400	156 lb⋅ft (212 N⋅m) at 2,400
200 cu in (3.3 L) Thriftpower I6 (1965–1966) 1-barrel	120 bhp (89 kW) at 4,400	190 lb⋅ft (258 N⋅m) at 2,400
260 cu in (4.3 L) small block V8 (1964) 2-barrel	164 bhp (122 kW) at 4,400	258 lb⋅ft (350 N⋅m) at 2,200
289 cu in (4.7 L) small block V8 (1965–1966) 2-barrel	200 bhp (149 kW) at 4,400	282 lb⋅ft (382 N⋅m) at 2,400
289 cu in (4.7 L) small block V8 (1964) 4-barrel	210 bhp (157 kW) at 4,400	300 lb⋅ft (407 N⋅m) at 2,800
289 cu in (4.7 L) small block V8 (1965–1966) 4-barrel	225 bhp (168 kW) at 4,800	305 lb⋅ft (414 N⋅m) at 3,200
289 cu in (4.7 L) small block HiPo V8 (1964–1966) 4-barrel	271 bhp (202 kW) at 6,000	312 lb⋅ft (423 N⋅m) at 3,400

== 1967–1968 ==
Mustang 1967–1968
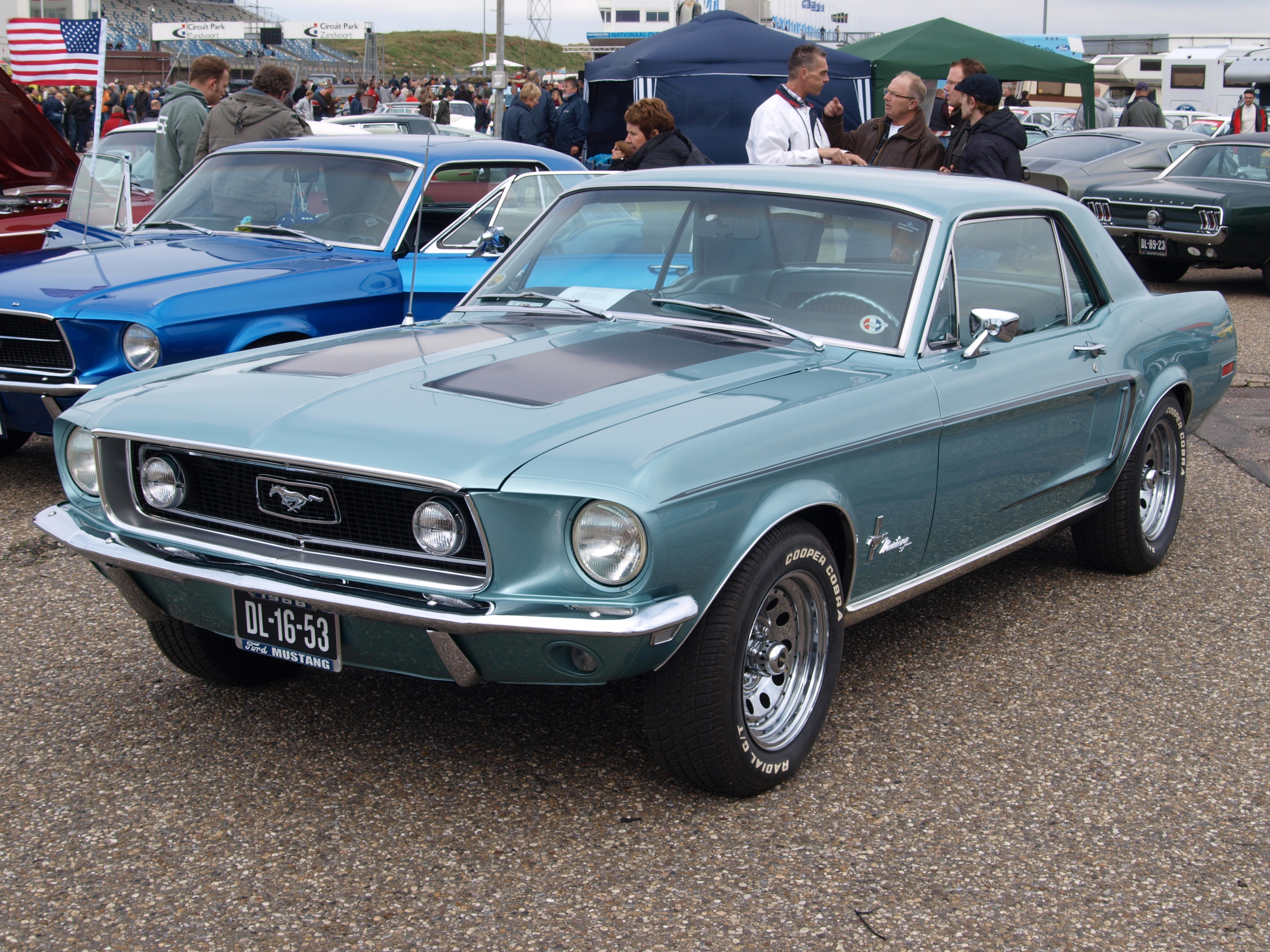
- 1968 Ford Mustang hardtop

Overview
- Production: August 1966 – August 1968
- Assembly: United States: Dearborn, Michigan (Ford River Rouge Complex); Milpitas, California (San Jose Assembly Plant); Edison, New Jersey (Edison Assembly); Mexico: Mexico City (La Villa Assembly); Venezuela: Valencia (Valencia Assembly); Peru: Lima (Ford Peru)
- Designer: Ross Humphries (1965); Don Kopka

Body and chassis
- Body style: 2-door hardtop; 2-door fastback; 2-door convertible

Powertrain
- Engine: 200 cu in (3.3 L) Thriftpower I6; 289 cu in (4.7 L) small block V8; 302 cu in (4.9 L) small block V8; 390 cu in (6.4 L) FE V8; 427 cu in (7.0 L) FE HiPo V8; 428 cu in (7.0 L) Cobra Jet V8
- Transmission: 3-speed manual; 4-speed manual; 3-speed automatic

Dimensions
- Wheelbase: 108 in (2,743 mm)
- Length: 183.6 in (4,663 mm)
- Width: 70.9 in (1,801 mm)
- Height: 51.6 in (1,311 mm)
- Curb weight: 2,758 lb (1,251 kg) (base)

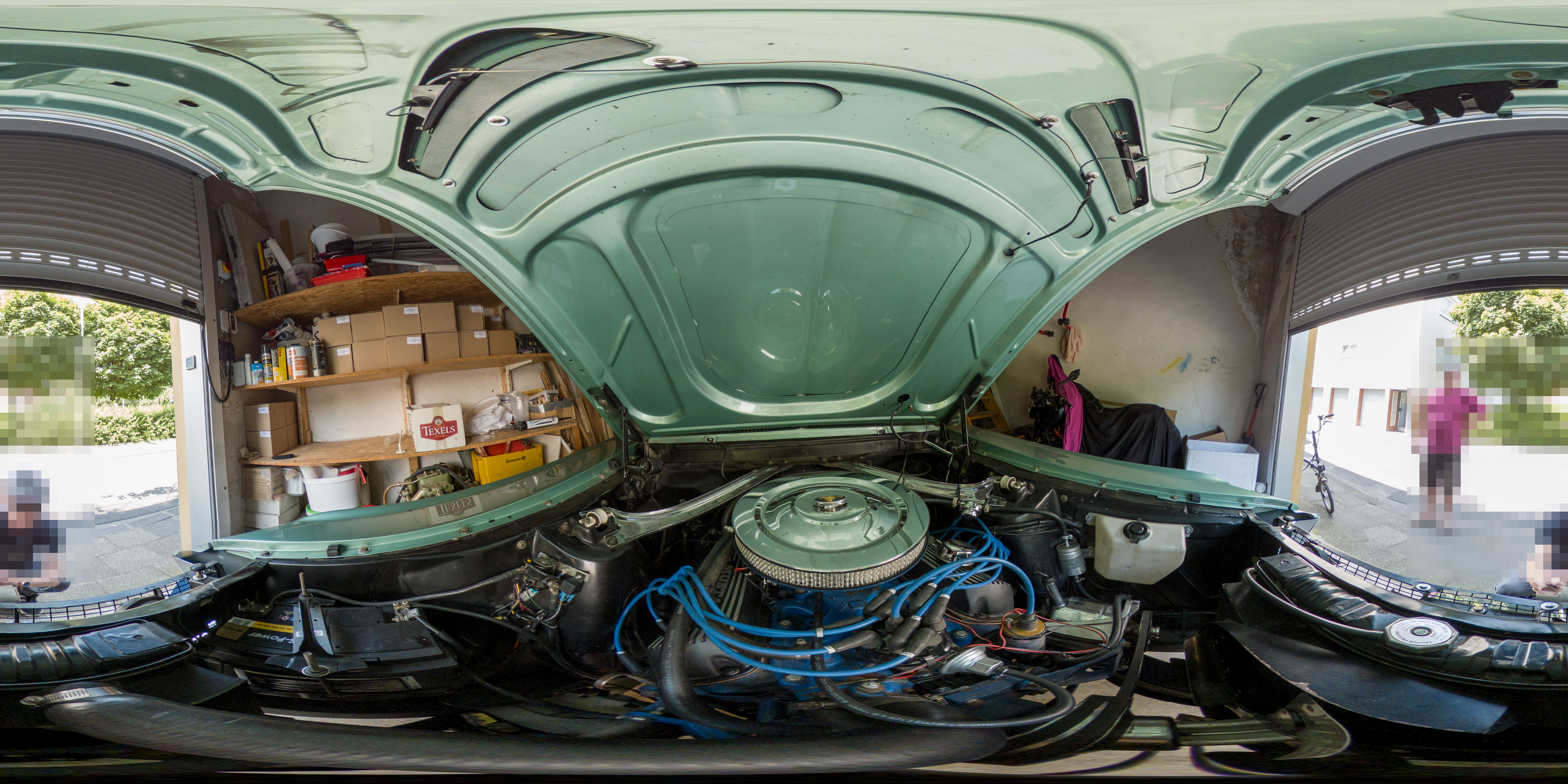
The engine, with open hood (view as a 360° interactive panorama)

The 1967 model year Mustang was the first significant redesign of the original model. Ford's designers began drawing up a larger version even as the original was achieving sales success, and while "Iacocca later complained about the Mustang's growth, he did oversee the redesign for 1967." The major mechanical feature was to allow the installation of a big-block V8 engine. The overall size, interior, and cargo space were increased. Exterior trim changes included concave taillights, side scoop (1967 model) and chrome (1968 model) side ornamentation, square rear-view mirrors, and usual yearly wheel and gas cap changes. The high-performance 289 option was placed behind the newer 335 hp (250 kW) 390 cu in (6.4 L) FE engine from the Ford Thunderbird, which was equipped with a four-barrel carburetor. During the mid-1968 model year, a drag racer for the street could be ordered with the optional 428 cu in (7.0 L) Cobra Jet engine which was officially rated at 335 hp (250 kW) all of these Mustangs were issued R codes on their VINs.

The 1967 Deluxe Interior was revised, discontinuing the embossed running horse motif on the seatbacks (the source for the "pony interior" nickname) in favor of a new deluxe interior package, which included special color options, brushed aluminum (from August 1966 production) or woodgrain dash trim, seat buttons, and special door panels. The hardtop also included upholstered quarter trim panels, a carryover from the 1965–1966 deluxe interior. The 1967 hardtop also had the chrome quarter trim caps, carried over from 1965–1966, but these were painted to match the interior in 1968 models. The 1967 deluxe interior included stainless steel-trimmed seat back shells, similar to those in the Thunderbird. These were dropped at the end of the 1967 model year and were not included in the woodgrain-trimmed 1968 interior. The deluxe steering wheel, which had been included in the deluxe interior for 1965 and 1966, became optional, and could also be ordered with the standard interior. The 1968 models that were produced from January 1968 were also the first model year to incorporate three-point lap and shoulder belts (which had previously been optional, in 1967–1968 models) as opposed to the standard lap belts. The air-conditioning option was fully integrated into the dash, the speakers and stereo were upgraded, and unique center and overhead consoles were options. The fastback model offered the option of a rear fold-down seat, and the convertible was available with folding glass windows. Gone was the Rally-Pac, since the new instrument cluster had provisions for an optional tachometer and clock. Its size and shape also precluded the installation of the accessory atop the steering column. The convenience group with four warning lights for low fuel, seat belt reminder, parking brake not released, and door ajar were added to the instrument panel, or, if one ordered the optional console and A/C, the lights were mounted on the console.

Changes for the 1968 model increased safety with a two-spoke energy-absorbing steering wheel, along with newly introduced shoulder belts. Other changes included front and rear side markers, "FORD" lettering removed from the hood, rearview mirror moved from frame to windshield, a 302 cu in (4.9 L) V8 engine option, and C-Stripe graphics were added.

The California Special Mustang, or GT/CS, was visually based on the Shelby model and was only sold in Western states. Its sister, the 'High Country Special', was sold in Denver, Colorado. While the GT/CS was only available as a coupe, the 'High Country Special' model was available in fastback and convertible configurations during the 1966 and 1967 model years, and as a coupe for 1968.

The 1968 Ford Mustang GT Fastback got a popularity boost after it was featured in the 1968 film Bullitt, starring Steve McQueen. In the film, McQueen drove a modified 1968 Mustang GT 2+2 Fastback chasing a Dodge Charger through the streets of San Francisco.

On January 10, 2020, the car that was driven by McQueen, later owned by Robert Kiernan, and subsequently by his son Sean, was sold at Mecum Auctions for a record price of $3.7 million (~$4.53 million in 2025), including auction fees.

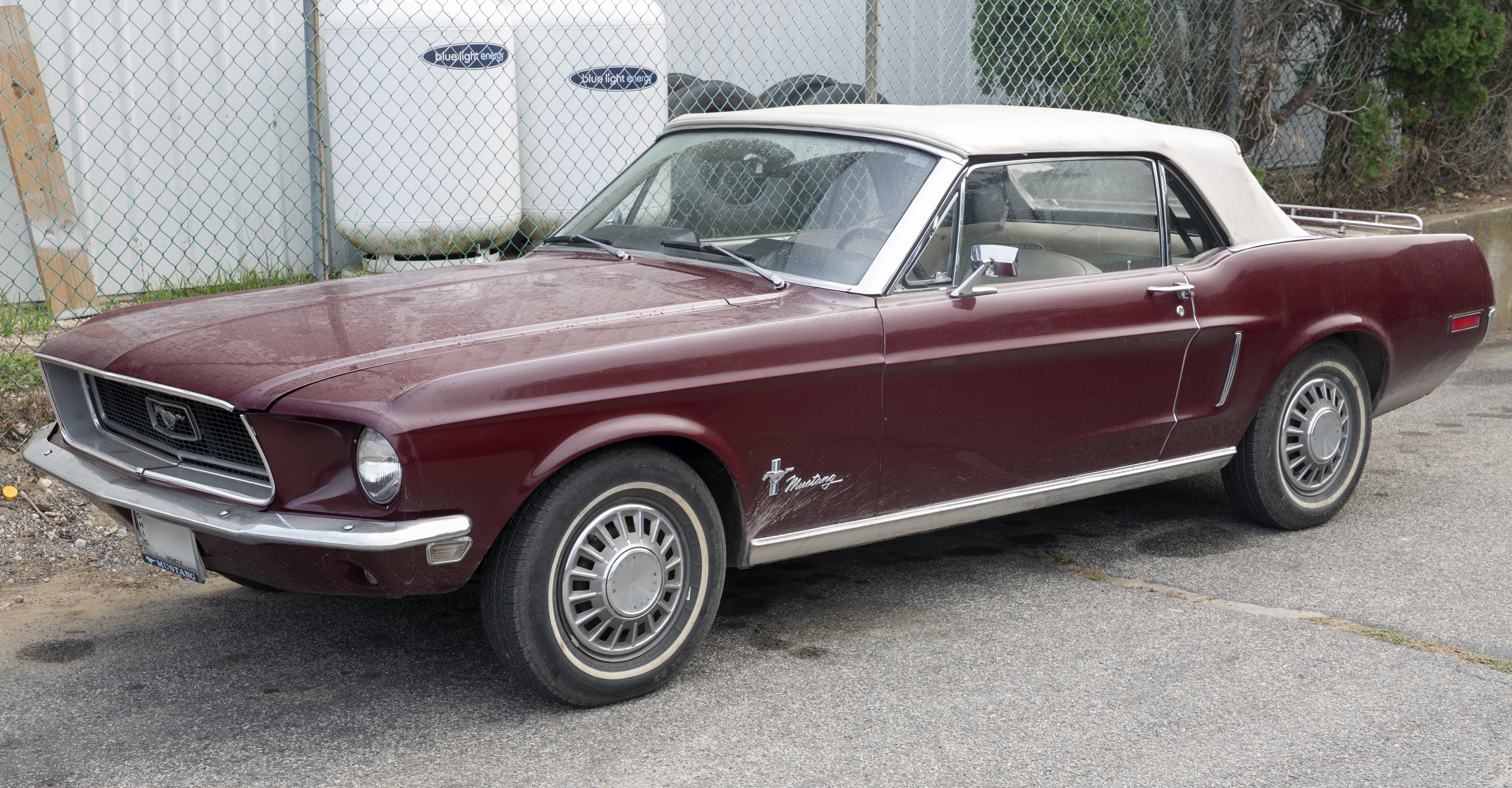
1968 convertible

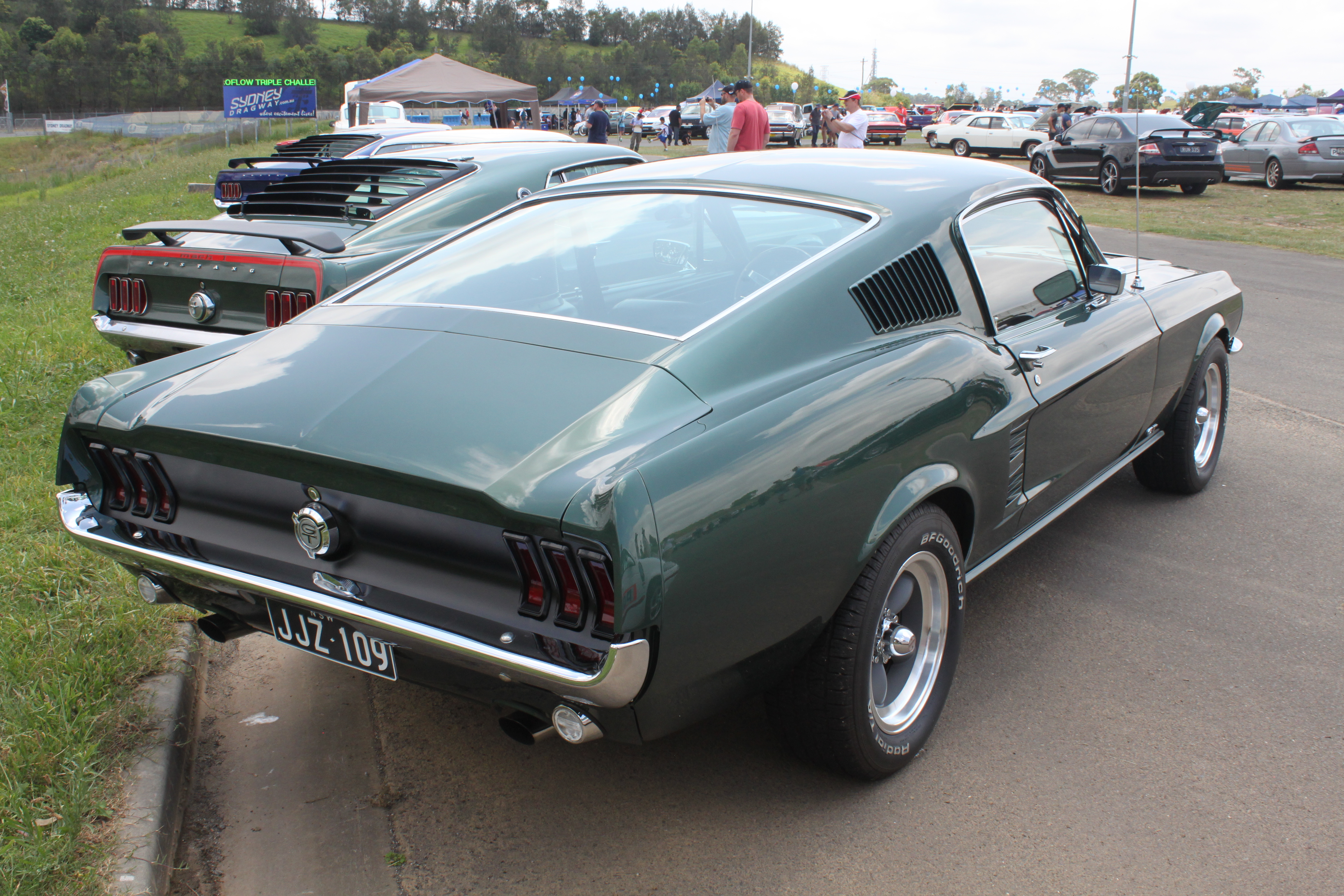
1967 fastback

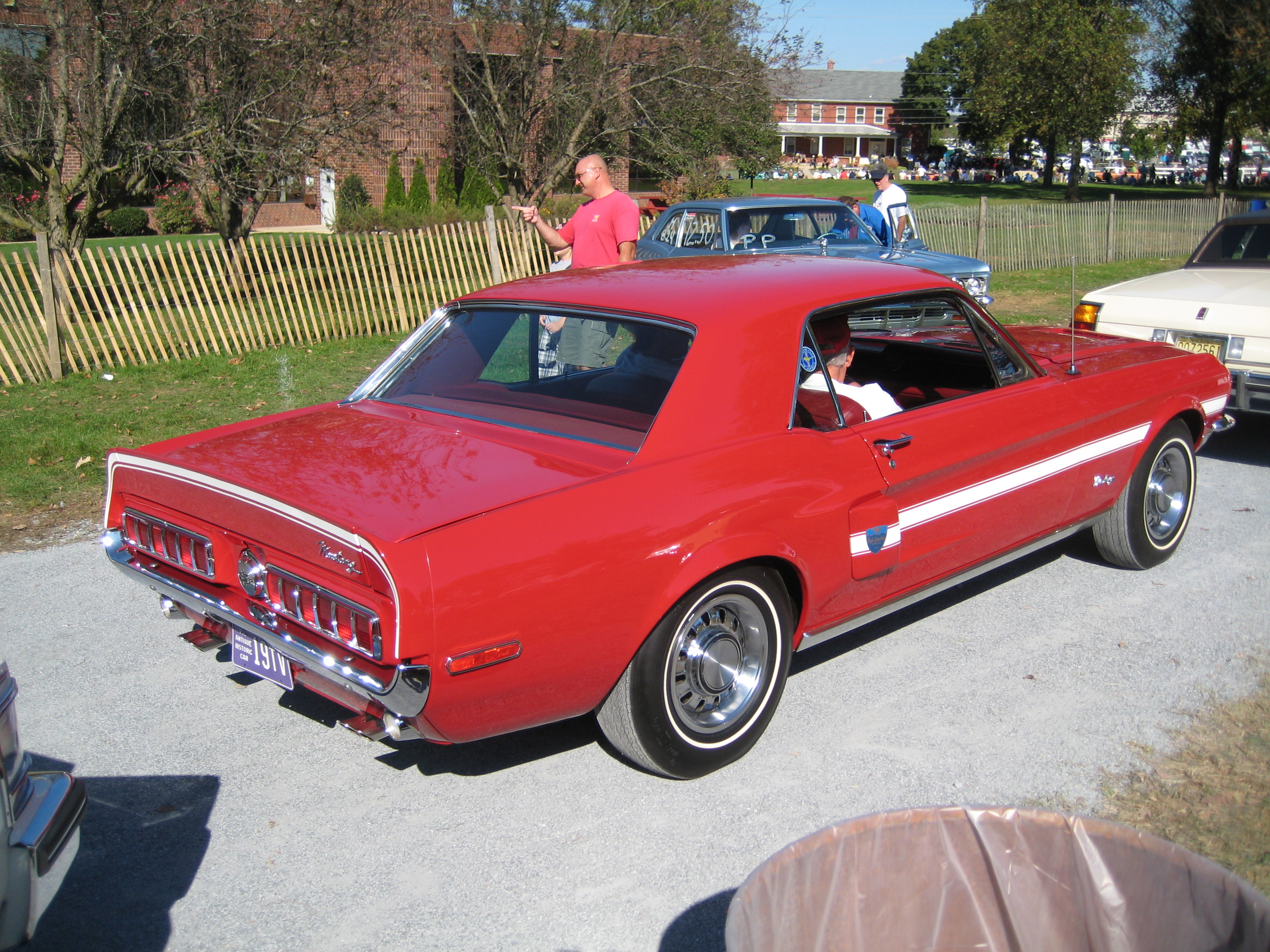
1968 High Country Special

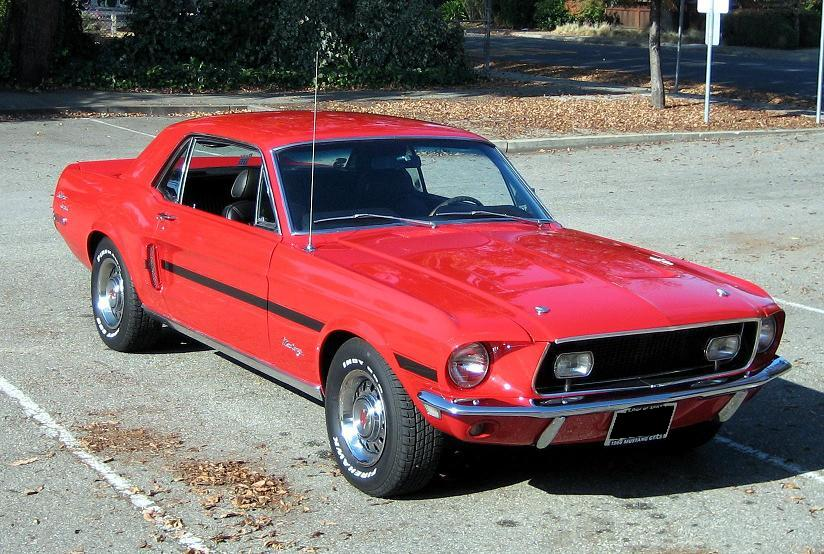
1968 California Special

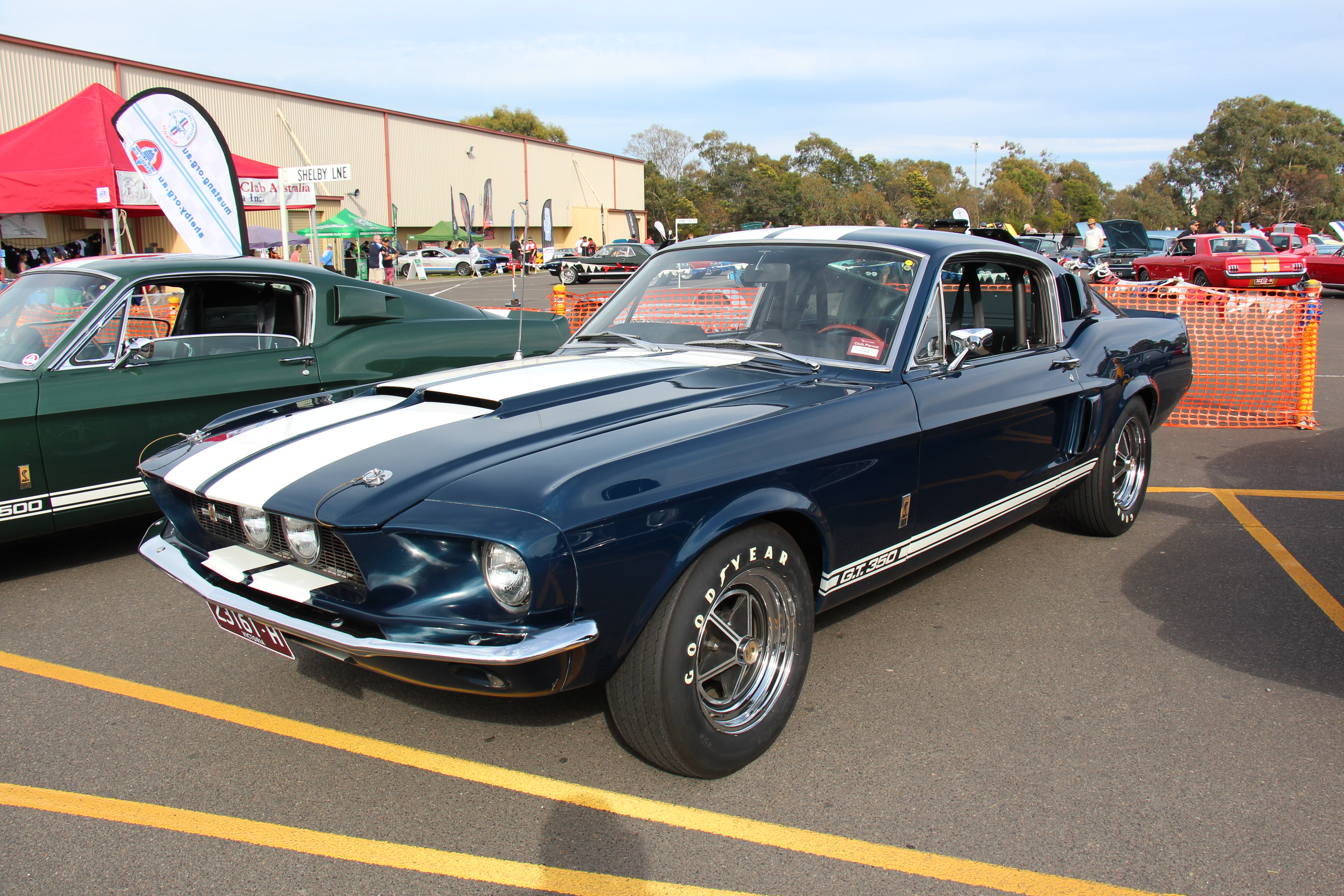
1967 Shelby GT350

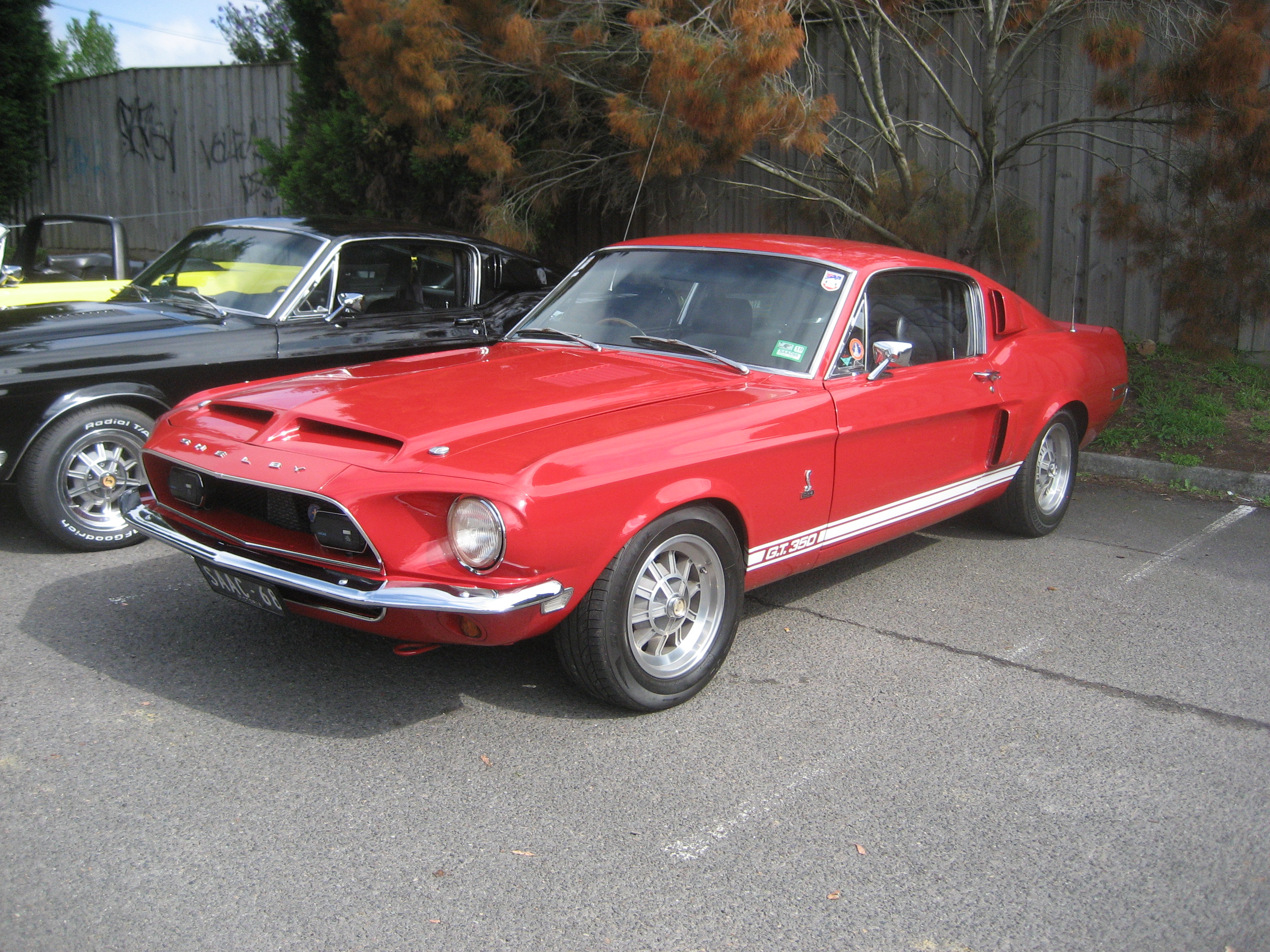
1968 Shelby GT350

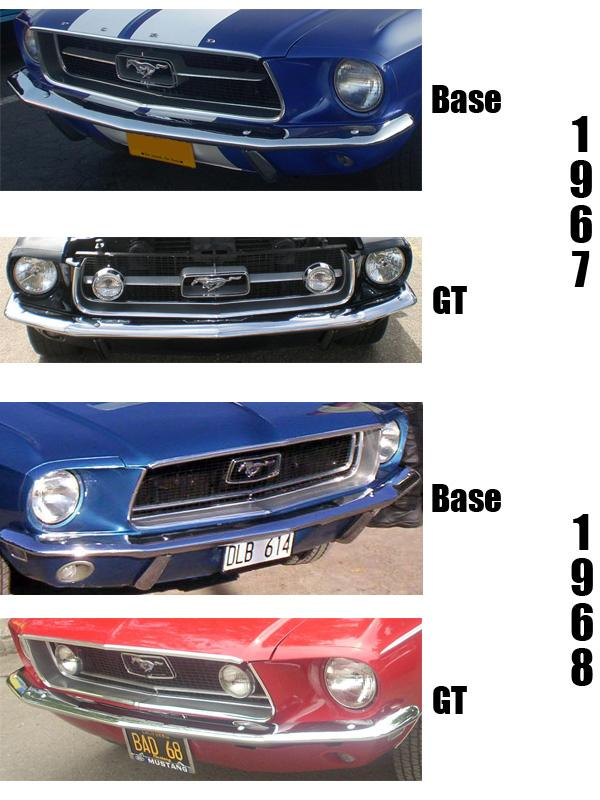
1967–1968 front end style comparison

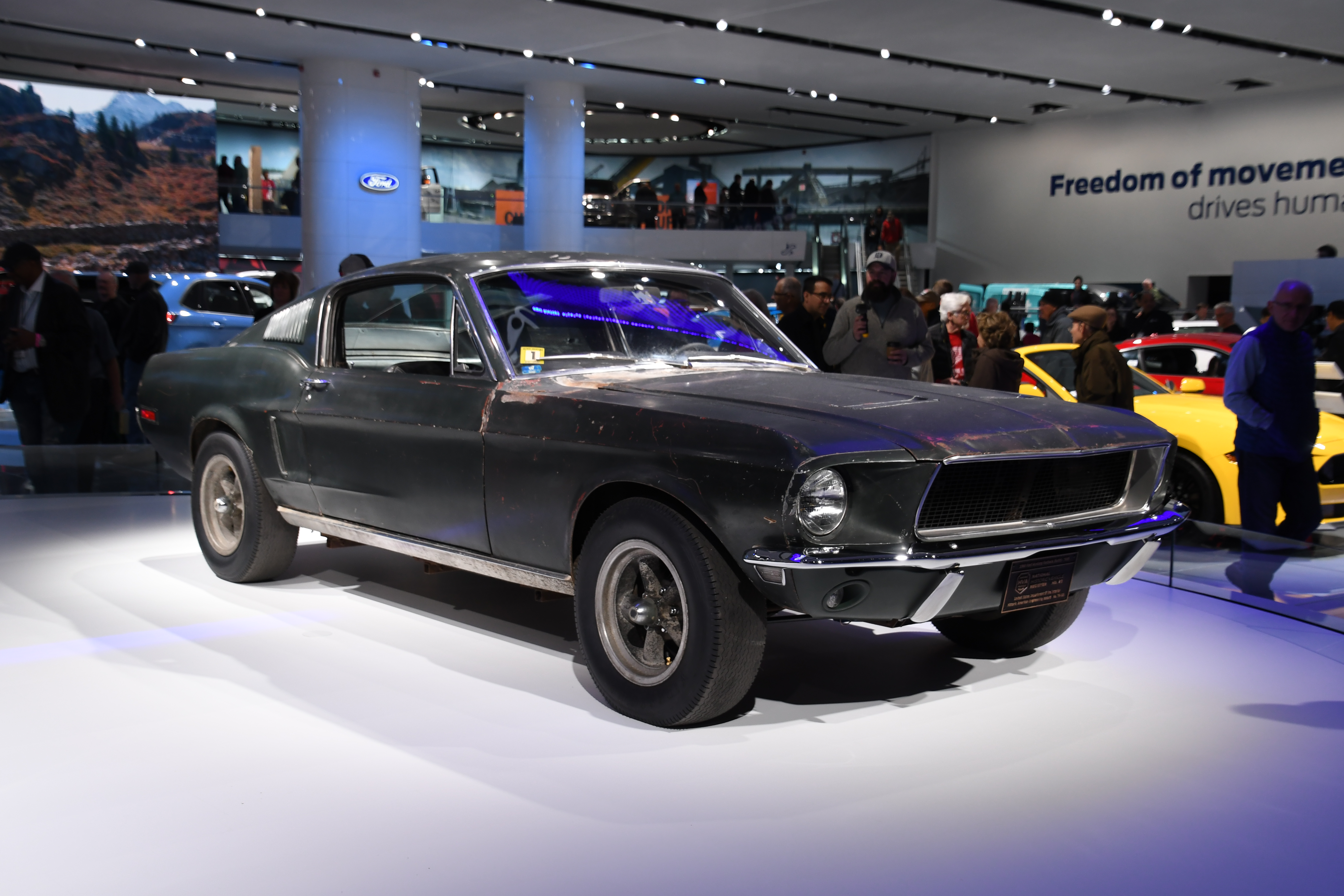
1968 Mustang from the Bullitt movie at the 2018 North American International Auto Show

=== Engines ===
Engine displacement, type	Year	Engine Code	carburetor type	max. power at rpm	max. torque at rpm
200 cu in (3.3 L) Thriftpower I6	1968	T	1-barrel	115 bhp (86 kW) at 4,400	190 lb⋅ft (258 N⋅m) at 2,400
200 cu in (3.3 L) Thriftpower I6	1967	T	1-barrel	120 bhp (89 kW) at 4,400	190 lb⋅ft (258 N⋅m) at 2,400
289 cu in (4.7 L) small block V8	1968	C	2-barrel	195 bhp (145 kW) at 4,600	288 lb⋅ft (390 N⋅m) at 2,600
289 cu in (4.7 L) small block V8	1967	C	2-barrel	200 bhp (149 kW) at 4,400	282 lb⋅ft (382 N⋅m) at 2,400
302 cu in (4.9 L) small block V8	1968	F	2-barrel	210 bhp (157 kW) at 4,600	300 lb⋅ft (407 N⋅m) at 2,600
289 cu in (4.7 L) small block V8	1967	A	4-barrel	225 bhp (168 kW) at 4,800	305 lb⋅ft (414 N⋅m) at 3,200
302 cu in (4.9 L) small block V8	1968	J	4-barrel	230 bhp (172 kW) at 4,800	310 lb⋅ft (420 N⋅m) at 2,800
289 cu in (4.7 L) small block HiPo V8	1967	K	4-barrel	271 bhp (202 kW) at 6,000	312 lb⋅ft (423 N⋅m) at 3,400
390 cu in (6.4 L) FE V8	1968	X	2-barrel	270 bhp (201 kW) at 4,400	401 lb⋅ft (544 N⋅m) at 2,600
390 cu in (6.4 L) FE V8	1967	S	4-barrel	320 bhp (239 kW) at 4,800	427 lb⋅ft (579 N⋅m) at 3,200
390 cu in (6.4 L) FE V8	1968	S	4-barrel	325 bhp (242 kW) at 4,800	427 lb⋅ft (579 N⋅m) at 3,200
428 cu in (7.0 L) Cobra Jet V8	1968	R	4-barrel	335 bhp (250 kW) at 5,200	440 lb⋅ft (597 N⋅m) at 3,400

== 1969–1970 ==
Mustang 1969–1970
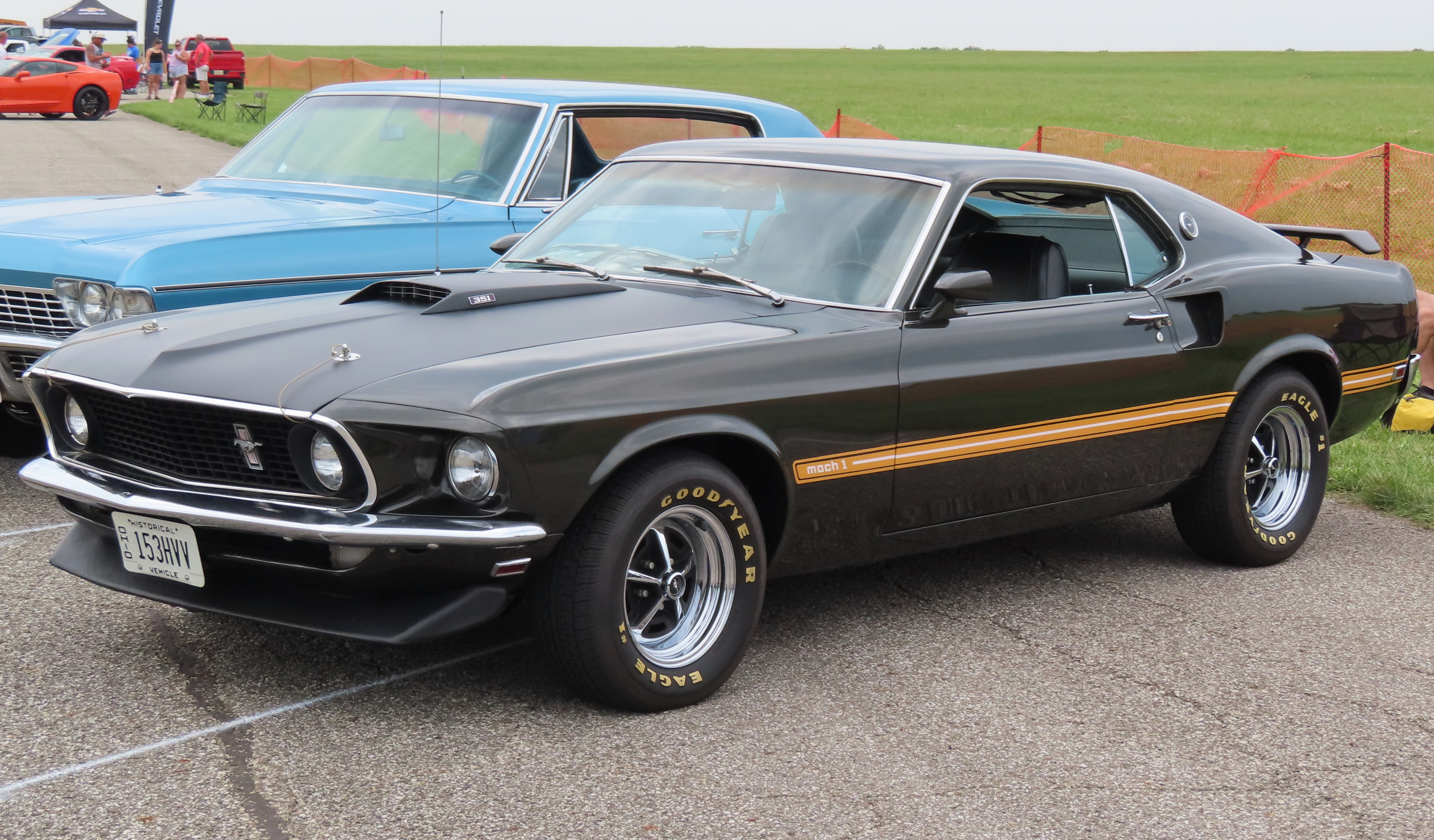
- 1969 Ford Mustang Mach 1

Overview
- Production: August 1968 – September 1970
- Assembly: United States: Dearborn, Michigan (Ford River Rouge Complex); Milpitas, California (San Jose Assembly Plant); Edison, New Jersey (Edison Assembly); Mexico: Mexico City (La Villa Assembly); Venezuela: Valencia (Valencia Assembly)
- Designer: Gale Halderman (1966)

Body and chassis
- Body style: 2-door hardtop; 2-door fastback; 2-door convertible

Powertrain
- Engine: 200 cu in (3.3 L) Thriftpower I6; 250 cu in (4.1 L) Thriftpower I6; 302 cu in (4.9 L) small block V8; 302 cu in (4.9 L) Boss V8; 351 cu in (5.8 L) Windsor V8; 351 cu in (5.8 L) Cleveland V8; 390 cu in (6.4 L) FE V8; 428 cu in (7.0 L) Cobra Jet & Super Cobra Jet V8; 429 cu in (7.0 L) Boss V8
- Transmission: 3-speed manual; 4-speed manual; 3-speed automatic

Dimensions
- Wheelbase: 108 in (2,743 mm)
- Length: 187.5 in (4,762 mm)
- Width: 71.7 in (1,821 mm)
- Height: 50.5 in (1,283 mm)
- Curb weight: 3,122 lb (1,416 kg) (base)

The 1969 model year restyle "added more heft to the body" with body length extended by 3.8 inches (97 mm) (the wheelbase remaining at 108 inches), width increased by almost half an inch, and the Mustang's "weight went up markedly too." 1969 was the first model to use quad headlamps placed both inside and outside the grille opening. The corralled grille pony was replaced with the pony and tribars logo, set off-center to the driver's side. The car was longer than previous models and sported convex rather than concave side panels. The fastback body version was named SportsRoof in Ford's literature.

The 1969 model year introduced the Mach 1, with a variety of powerplant options and many new styling and performance features. Distinctive reflective striping was placed along the body sides, with a pop-open gas cap, dual exhausts, matte-black hood with simulated air scoop, and NASCAR-style cable with pin tie-downs. It had steel wheels with white lettered Goodyear Polyglas tires. A functional "shaker" hood scoop – which visibly vibrated by being attached directly to the air cleaner through a hole in the hood – was available, as were tail-mounted wing and chin spoilers and rear window louvered blackout shade. The Mach 1 featured a deluxe interior with simulated wood trim, high-backed seats, extra sound deadening, remote sports mirrors, and other features. The Mach 1 proved popular with buyers with 72,458 cars sold through 1969.

The Boss 302 was created to satisfy Trans Am rules and featured distinctive hockey-stick stripes, while the understated Boss 429 was created to homologate the Boss 429 engine (based on the new Ford 385 series engine) for NASCAR use. The two Boss models received fame on the track and street. A total of 1,628 Boss 302s and 859 Boss 429s were sold through 1969 – making these vehicles somewhat rare.

A new "luxury" model became available starting for 1969, available in only the hardtop body style. The 'Grande' featured a soft ride, 55 pounds (24.9 kg) of extra sound deadening, as well as a deluxe interior with simulated wood trim. It was popular with buyers with 22,182 units sold through 1969.

Amidst other special editions, the 1969 Mustang E was offered for those desiring high fuel efficiency. The 1969 Limited Edition Mustang E was a rare (about 50 produced) fastback special model designed for economy. It came with a six-cylinder engine (250 cu in (4.1 L)), a high stall torque converter for the standard automatic transmission, and a low, 2.33:1 rear axle ratio. Mustang E lettering on the rear quarters identified the special Mustang E. Air conditioning was not available on the 'E' model.

The Mustang GT was discontinued in 1969 due to poor sales versus the success of the new Mach 1 with only 5,396 GT models sold that year.

A new 250 cu in (4.1 L) Thriftpower I6 engine with 155 hp (116 kW) filled the gap between the existing 200 cu in (3.3 L) Thriftpower I6 and the V8 engine line-up.

Although 1969 continued with many of the same basic V8 engines available on 1968 models, notably a revised 302 cu in (4.9 L) small block engine with 220 hp (164 kW), the 390 cu in (6.4 L) FE with 320 hp (239 kW) and the recently launched 428 cu in (7.0 L) Cobra Jet engine (with or without Ram-Air) with an advertised 335 hp (250 kW), a variety of options and changes were introduced to keep the Mustang fresh and competitive including a new performance V8 available in 250 hp (186 kW) or 290 hp (216 kW) tune known as the 351 cu in (5.8 L) Windsor (351W), which was effectively a stretched and revised 302 cu in (4.9 L) to achieve the extra stroke.

The 428 cu in (7.0 L) Cobra Jet engine continued unchanged in the 1969 and 1970 model years and continued to be advertised at 335 hp (250 kW). If a V or W axle was ordered (3.90 or 4.30 locking ratio) on any Cobra Jet Mustang, engine improvements were added to make it more reliable on the strip. Included was an engine oil cooler (making AC not available as an option), stronger crankshaft and conrods, improved engine balancing, and was named the 'Super Cobra Jet'. These improvements were later referred to as 'Drag Pack'.

The 1969 Shelby Mustang came under Ford's control and was made to look markedly different from regular production Mustangs, despite being built in-house by Ford. The custom styling included a fiberglass front end with a combination loop bumper/grille that increased the car's overall length by 3 inches (76 mm), as well as five air intakes on the hood. Two models were available, GT-350 (with a 351 cu in (5.8 L) Windsor (351W) producing 290 hp (216 kW)) and GT-500 (with the 428 cu in (7.0 L) Cobra Jet engine), in both sportsroof or convertible versions. All 1969–1970 Shelby Mustangs were produced in 1969. Because of dwindling sales, the 789 remaining 1969 cars were given new serial numbers and titled as 1970 models. They had modified front air dam and a blackout paint treatment around the hood scoops.

The 1970 model year Mustangs were restyled to be less aggressive and therefore returned to single headlamps which were moved to the inside of the grille opening with 'fins' on the outside of the grille sides. The styling of the 1969 model was deemed to have caused a drop in sales and this prompted the headlamp revisions and simplification of other exterior styling aspects for 1970. In the end, however, the 1969 model year sales exceeded those of 1970. The rear fender air scoops were removed and the taillight panel was flat instead of concave as on 1969 models. The interior options remained mostly unchanged.

1970 model year saw the previous 351W V8 engine options replaced with a new 351 cu in (5.8 L) Cleveland (351C) V8 in either 2V (2-venturi carburetor) or 4V (4-venturi carburetor) versions; however, some early production 1970 Mustangs had the 351W. The 351C 4V (M code) engine featured 11.0:1 compression and produced 300 bhp (224 kW; 304 PS) at 5400 rpm. This new performance engine incorporated elements learned from the Ford 385 series engine and the Boss 302, particularly the poly-angle combustion chambers with canted valves and the thin-wall casting technology.

Ford made 96 'Mustang Twister Special' cars for Ford's Kansas City District Sales Office in late 1969. The Twister Specials were Grabber Orange Mach 1s with special decals. Ford also made a few 'Sidewinders', which were built in Dearborn, shipped to Omaha, and sold in Iowa and Nebraska. They were available in Grabber Green, Grabber Blue, Calypso Coral, and Yellow. The stripes came in the trunk to be installed by dealers.

A number of special order "Lawman" 1970 Mustangs were sent to United States Armed Forces soldiers stationed in the Pacific theatre, notably a Boss 429 nicknamed the "Lawman" that was sent to Vietnam.

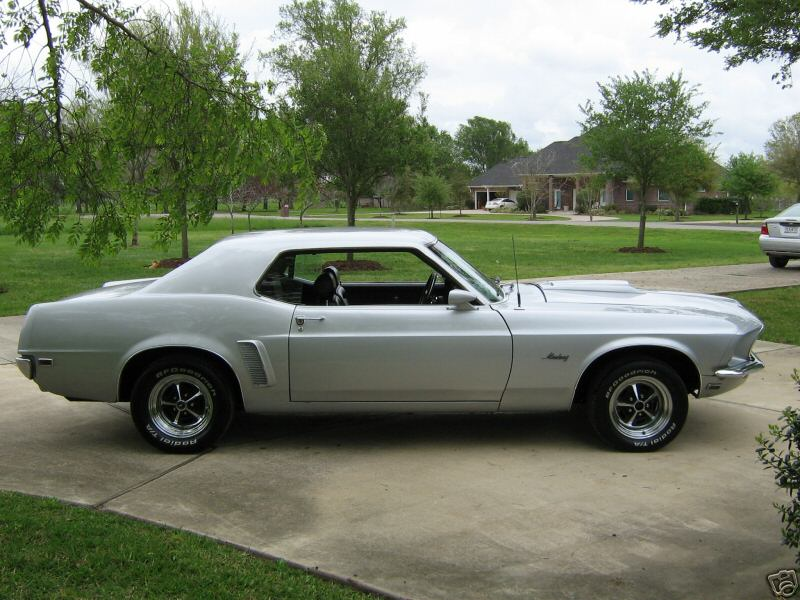
1969 Mustang Hardtop

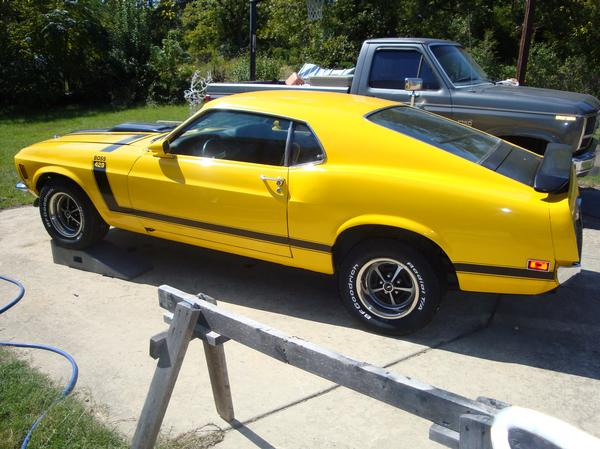
1970 Mustang SportsRoof

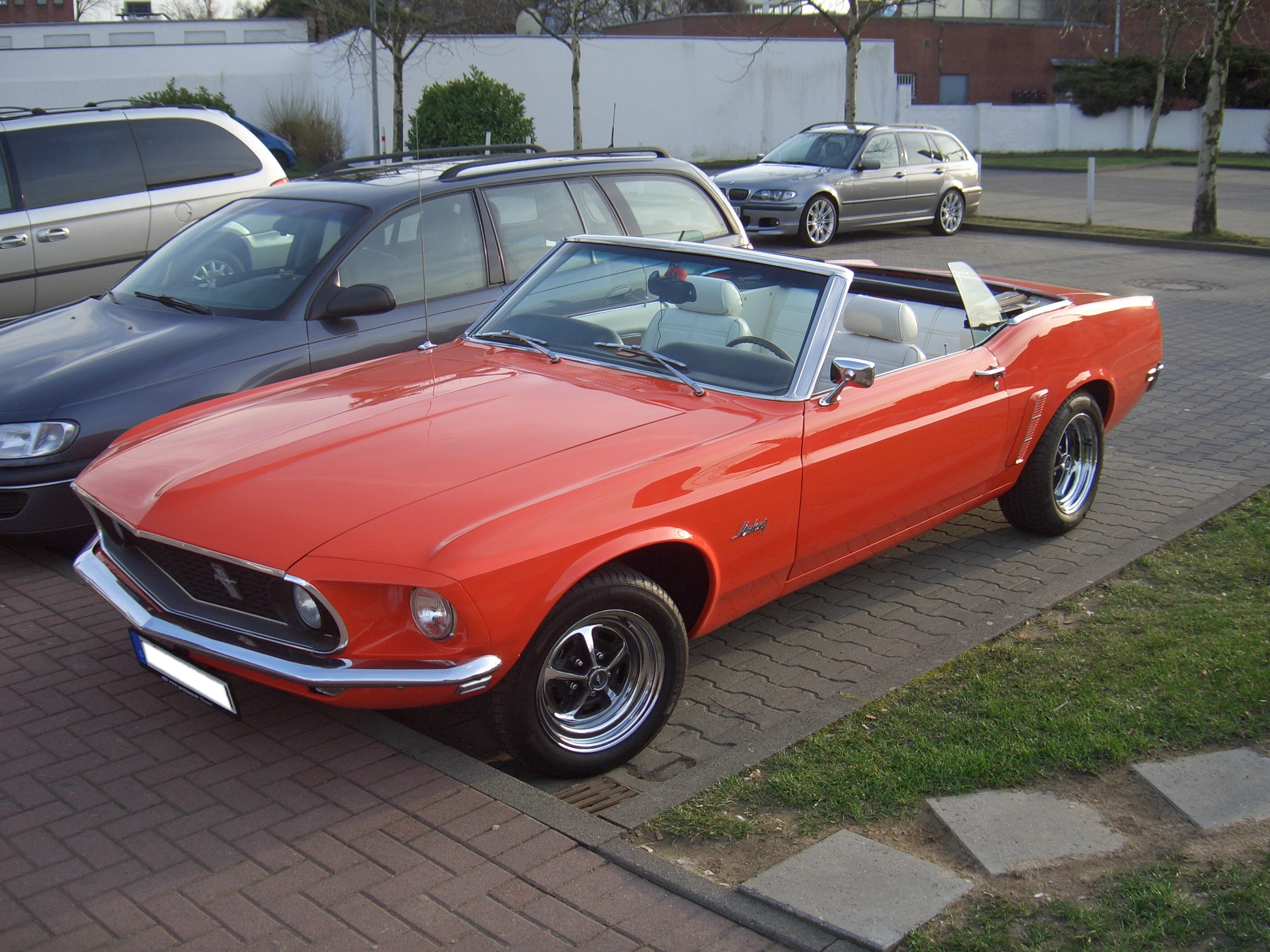
Mustang Convertible

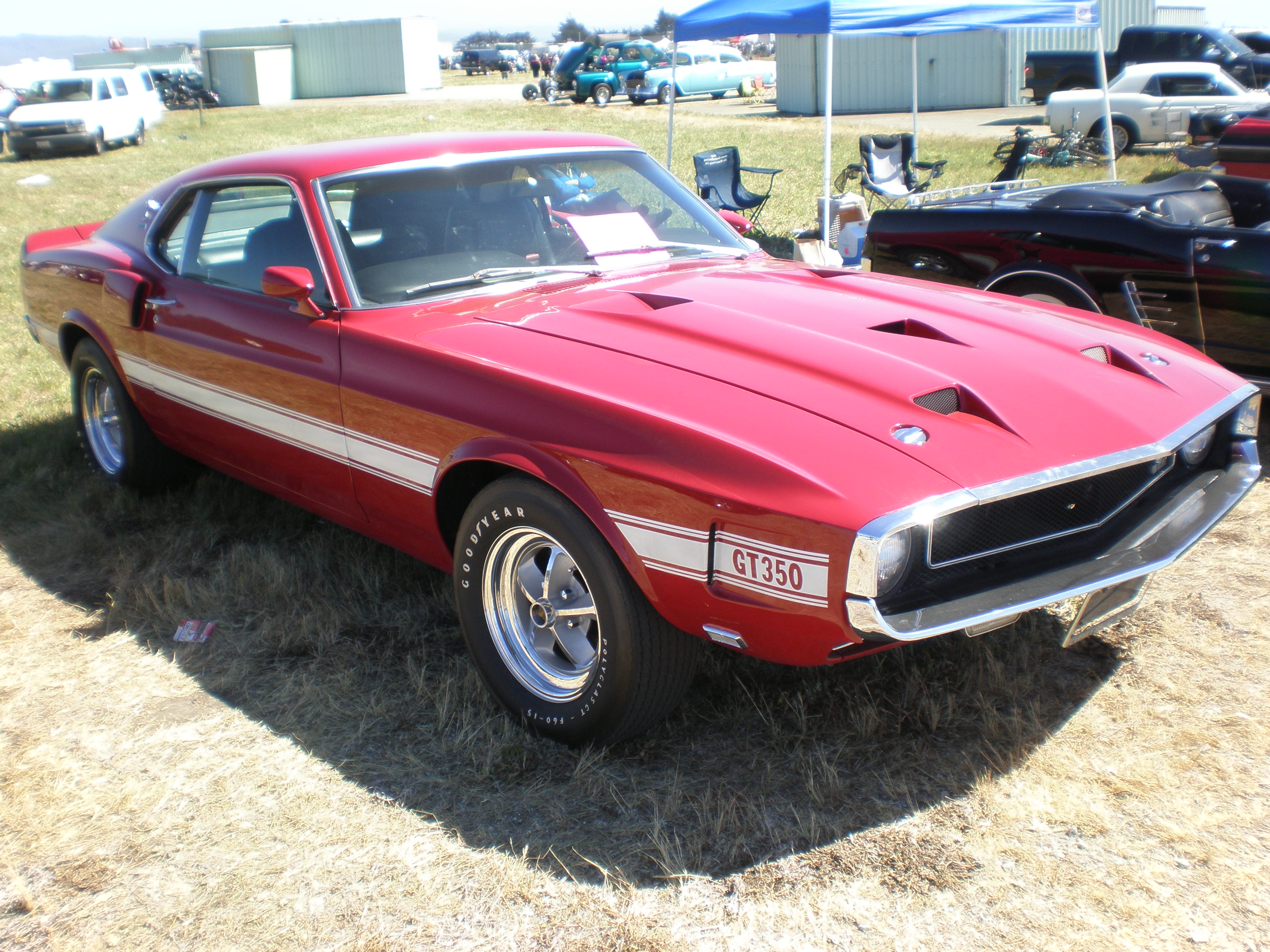
Shelby GT350

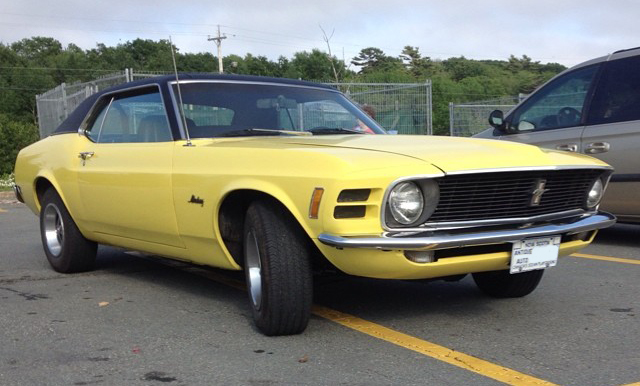
1970 Ford Mustang Grande

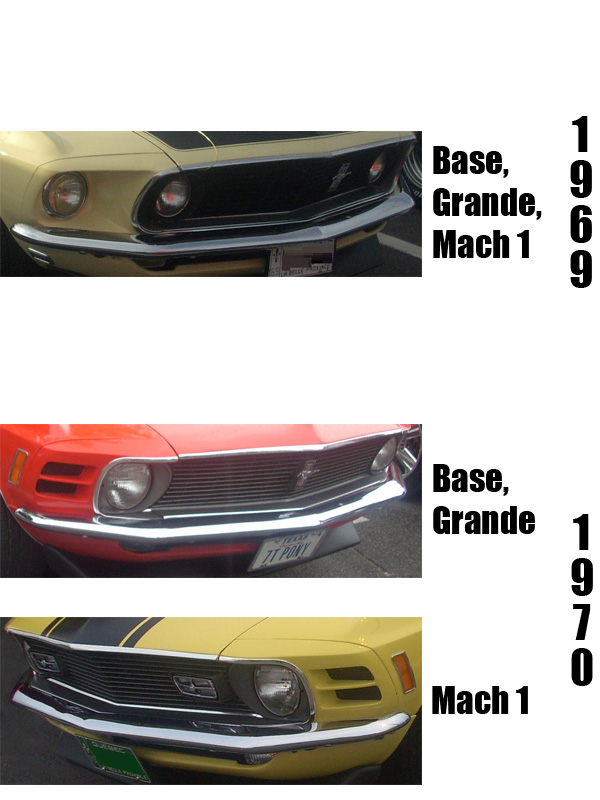
1969–1970 Mustang front end comparison

=== Engines ===
engine displacement, type, carburetor type	max. power at rpm	max. torque at rpm
200 cu in (3.3 L) Thriftpower I6 (1970) 1-barrel	120 bhp (89 kW) at 4,400	190 lb⋅ft (258 N⋅m) at 2,900
250 cu in (4.1 L) Thriftpower I6 (1969–1970) 1-barrel	155 bhp (116 kW) at 4,000	240 lb⋅ft (325 N⋅m) at 2,600
302 cu in (4.9 L) small block V8 (1969–1970) 2-barrel	210 bhp (157 kW) at 4,600	300 lb⋅ft (407 N⋅m) at 2,600
351 cu in (5.8 L) Windsor V8 (1969) 2-barrel	250 bhp (186 kW) at 4,600	355 lb⋅ft (481 N⋅m) at 2,600
351 cu in (5.8 L) Cleveland V8 (1970) 2-barrel	250 bhp (186 kW) at 5,400	355 lb⋅ft (481 N⋅m) at 3,400
351 cu in (5.8 L) Windsor V8 (1969) 4-barrel	290 bhp (216 kW) at 4,800	385 lb⋅ft (522 N⋅m) at 3,200
302 cu in (4.9 L) Boss V8 (1969–1970) 4-barrel	290 bhp (216 kW) at 5,800	290 lb⋅ft (393 N⋅m) at 2,600
390 cu in (6.4 L) FE V8 (1969) 4-barrel	320 bhp (239 kW) at 4,600	427 lb⋅ft (579 N⋅m) at 3,200
351 cu in (5.8 L) Cleveland V8 (1970) 4-barrel	300 bhp (224 kW) at 5,400	385 lb⋅ft (522 N⋅m) at 3,400
428 cu in (7.0 L) Cobra Jet & Super Cobra Jet V8 (1969–1970) 4-barrel	335 bhp (250 kW) at 5,200	440 lb⋅ft (597 N⋅m) at 3,400
429 cu in (7.0 L) Boss V8 (1969–1970) 4-barrel	375 bhp (280 kW) at 5,200	450 lb⋅ft (610 N⋅m) at 3,400

== 1971–1973 ==
Mustang 1971–1973
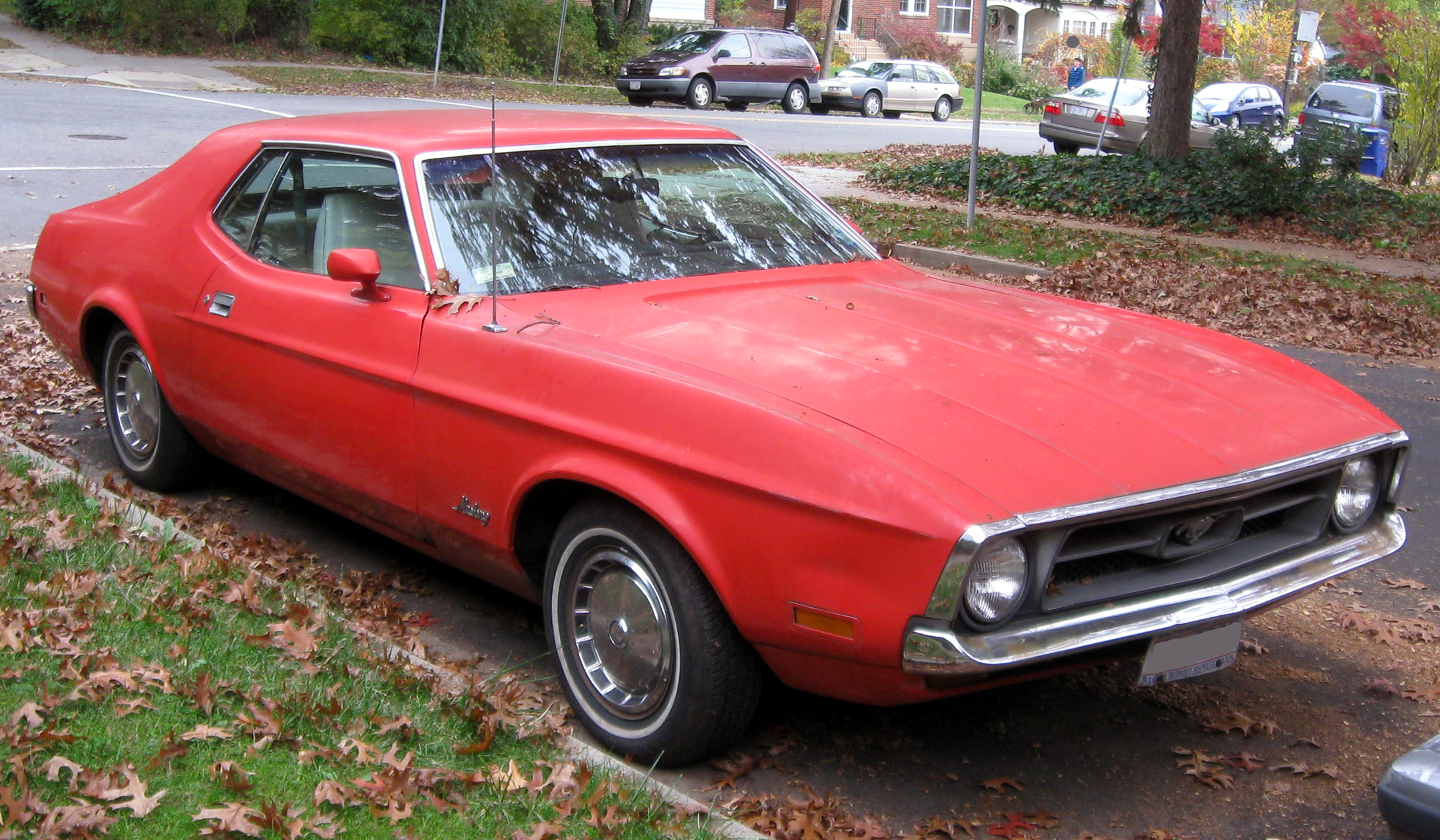
- 1972 Ford Mustang hardtop

Overview
- Production: 1970–1973
- Assembly: United States: Dearborn, Michigan (Ford River Rouge Complex); Milpitas, California (San Jose Assembly Plant); Edison, New Jersey (Edison Assembly); Mexico: Mexico City (La Villa Assembly); Venezuela: Valencia (Valencia Assembly)
- Designer: Gale Halderman; Semon "Bunkie" Knudsen (1968)

Body and chassis
- Body style: 2-door hardtop; 2-door fastback; 2-door convertible

Powertrain
- Engine: 250 cu in (4.1 L) Thriftpower I6; 302 cu in (4.9 L) small block V8; 351 cu in (5.8 L) Cleveland V8; 429 cu in (7.0 L) Cobra Jet & Super Cobra Jet V8
- Transmission: 3-speed manual; 4-speed manual; 3-speed automatic

Dimensions
- Wheelbase: 109 in (2,769 mm)
- Length: 189.5 in (4,813 mm)
- Width: 74.1 in (1,882 mm)
- Height: 50.1 in (1,273 mm)
- Curb weight: 3,560 lb (1,615 kg)

=== 1971 ===
Introduced in September 1970, the 1971 Mustang was green-lighted by Ford's new president, Semon "Bunkie" Knudsen, formerly of General Motors. Again, the revised model grew in size, gaining 3 inches in width to accommodate Ford's big block 429 cu in (7.0 L) V8 without need for an extensive suspension redesign.

As before there were three body styles offered: Hardtop (available in base or Grande trim), SportsRoof (available in base or Mach 1 trim), and convertible (no specific trim packages available).

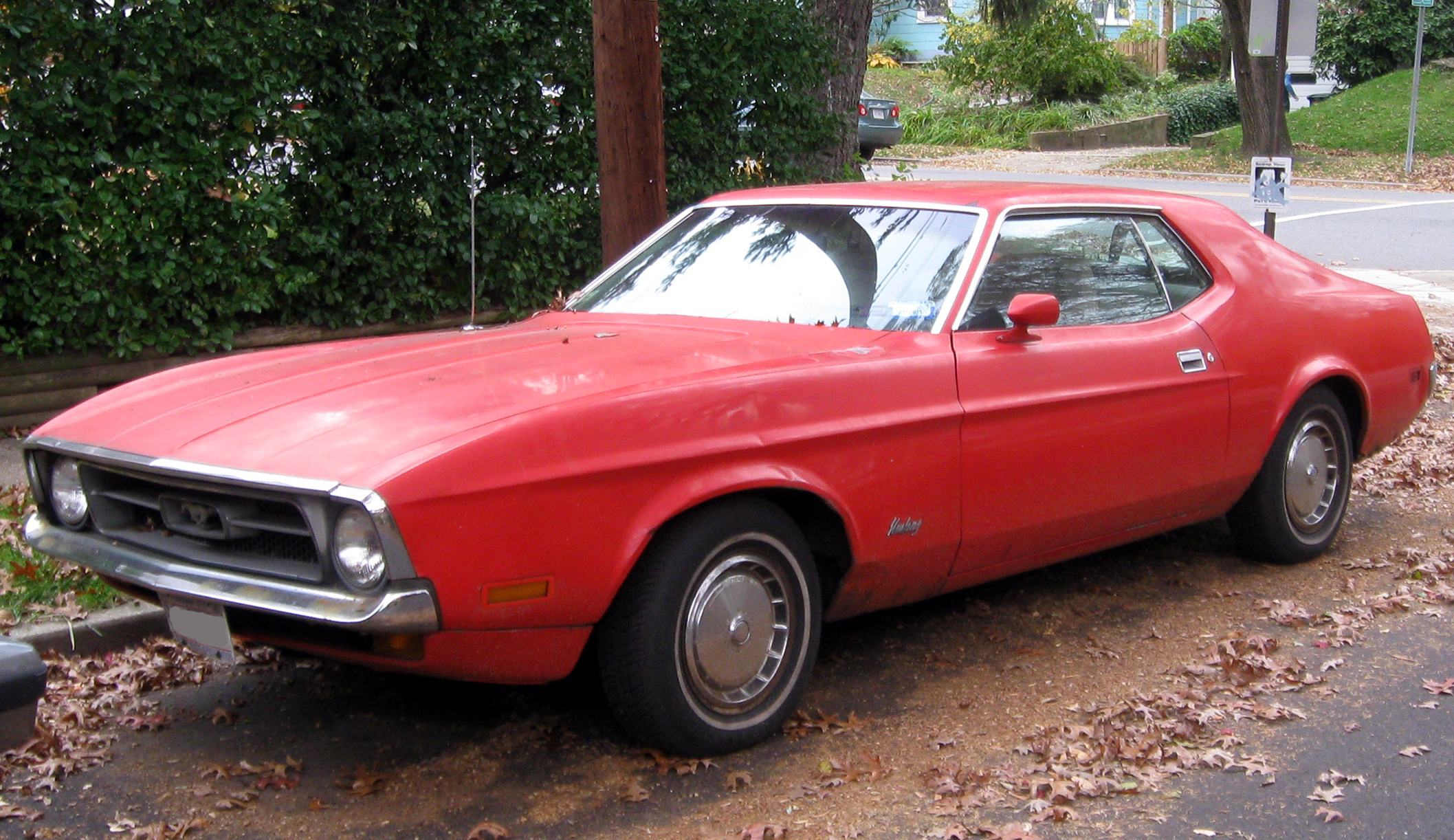
1971–1972 Mustang hardtop

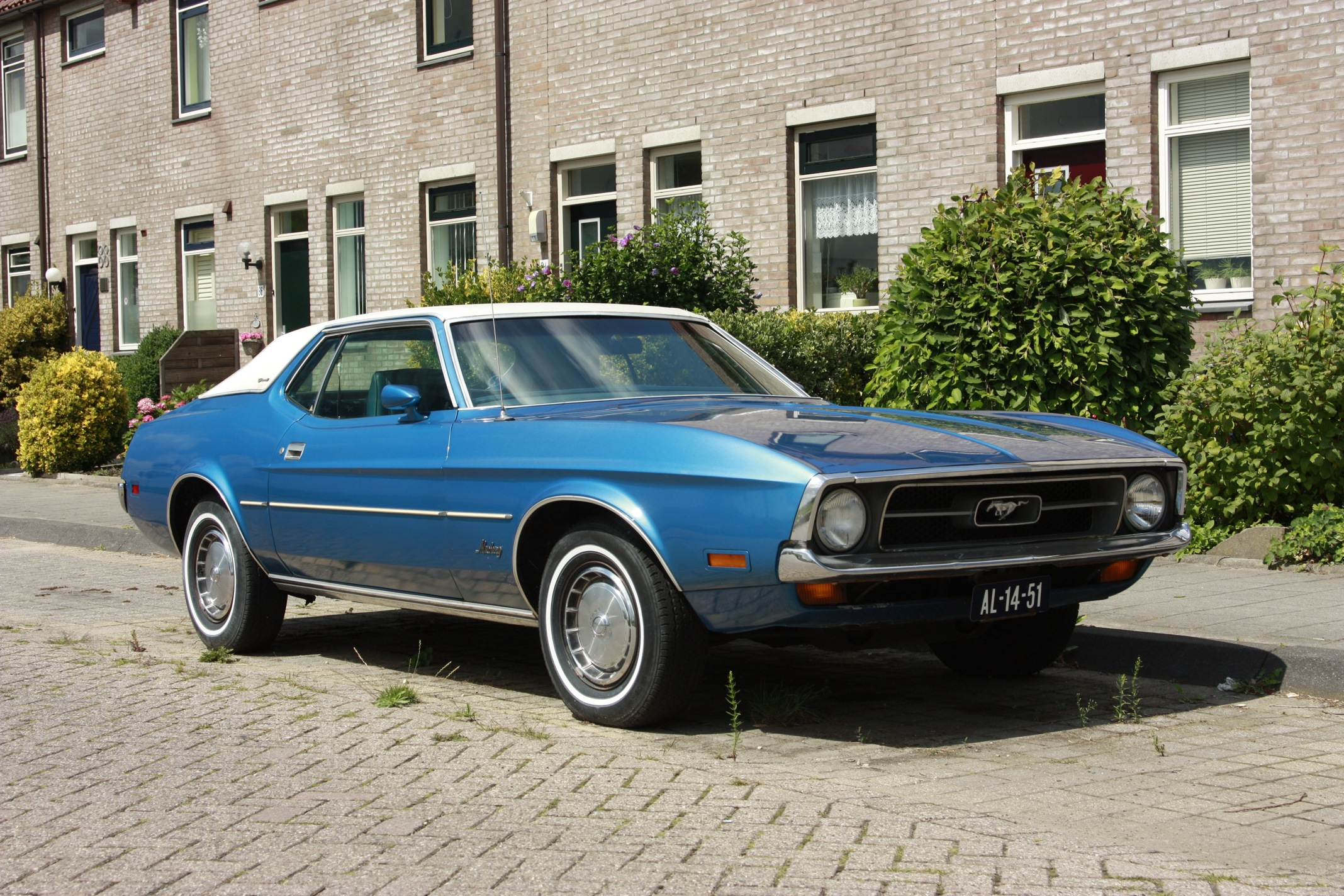
1971–1972 Mustang Grande hardtop

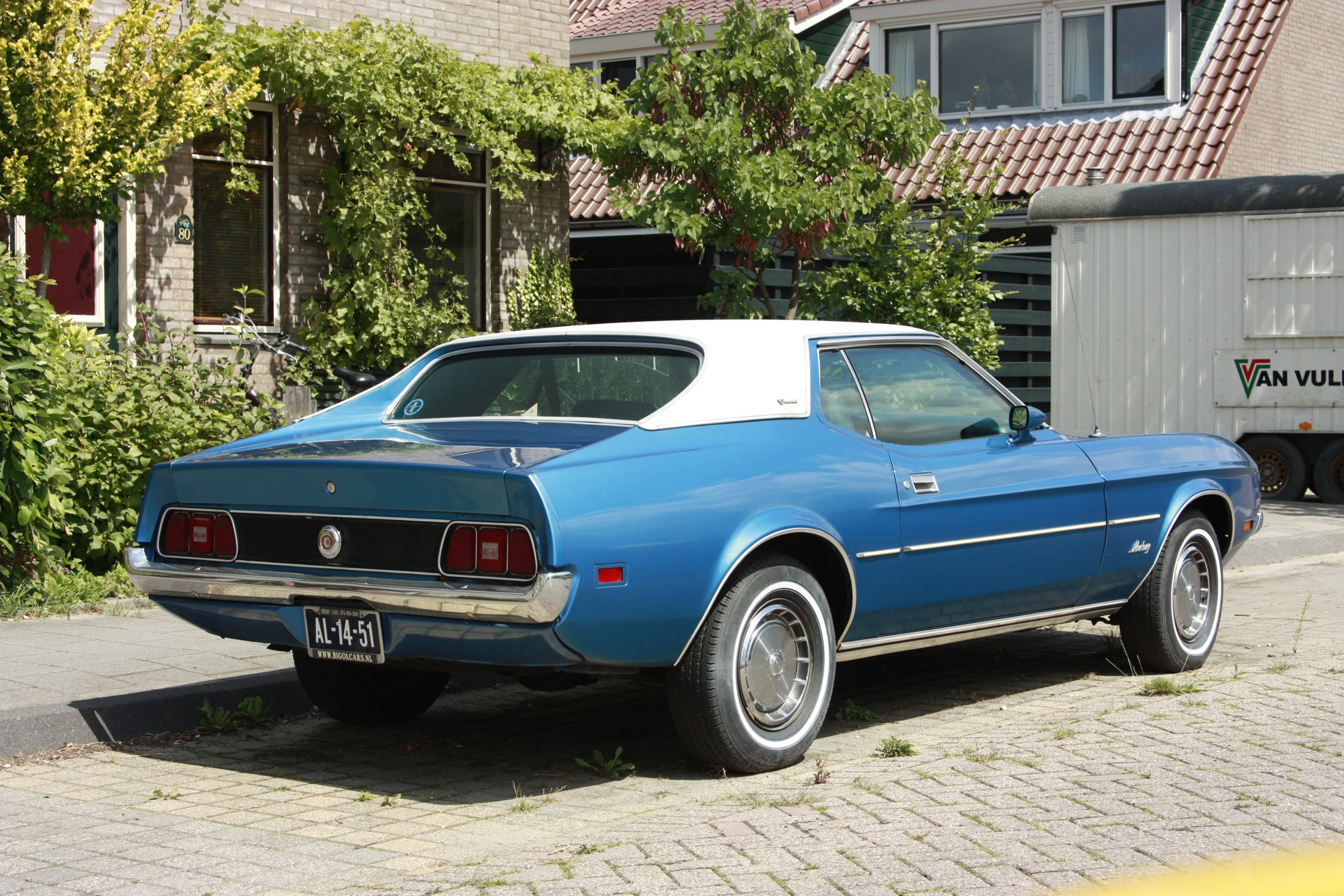
1971–1972 Mustang Grande hardtop

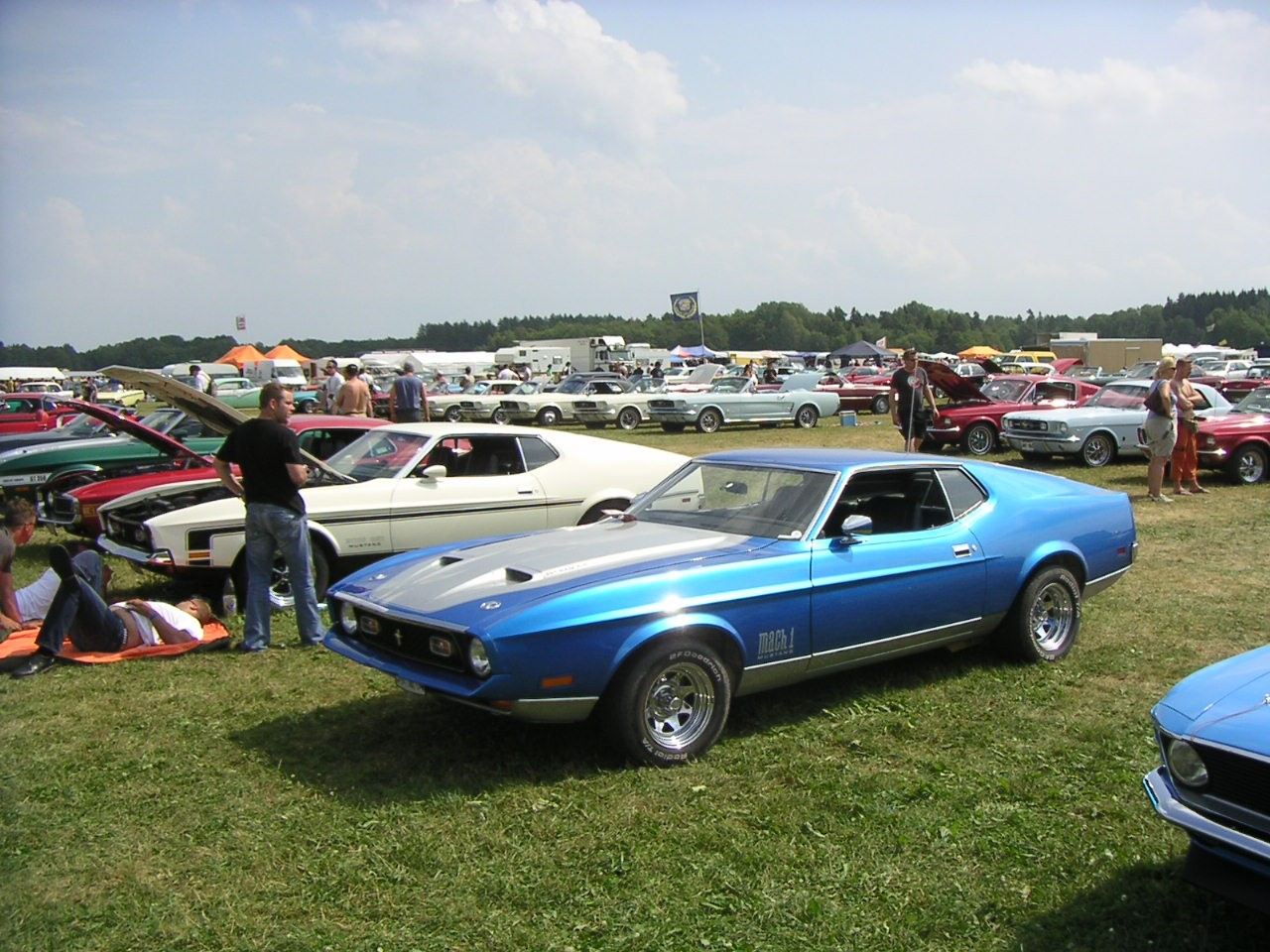
1971–1972 Mustang Mach 1 (w/o optional tape stripes)

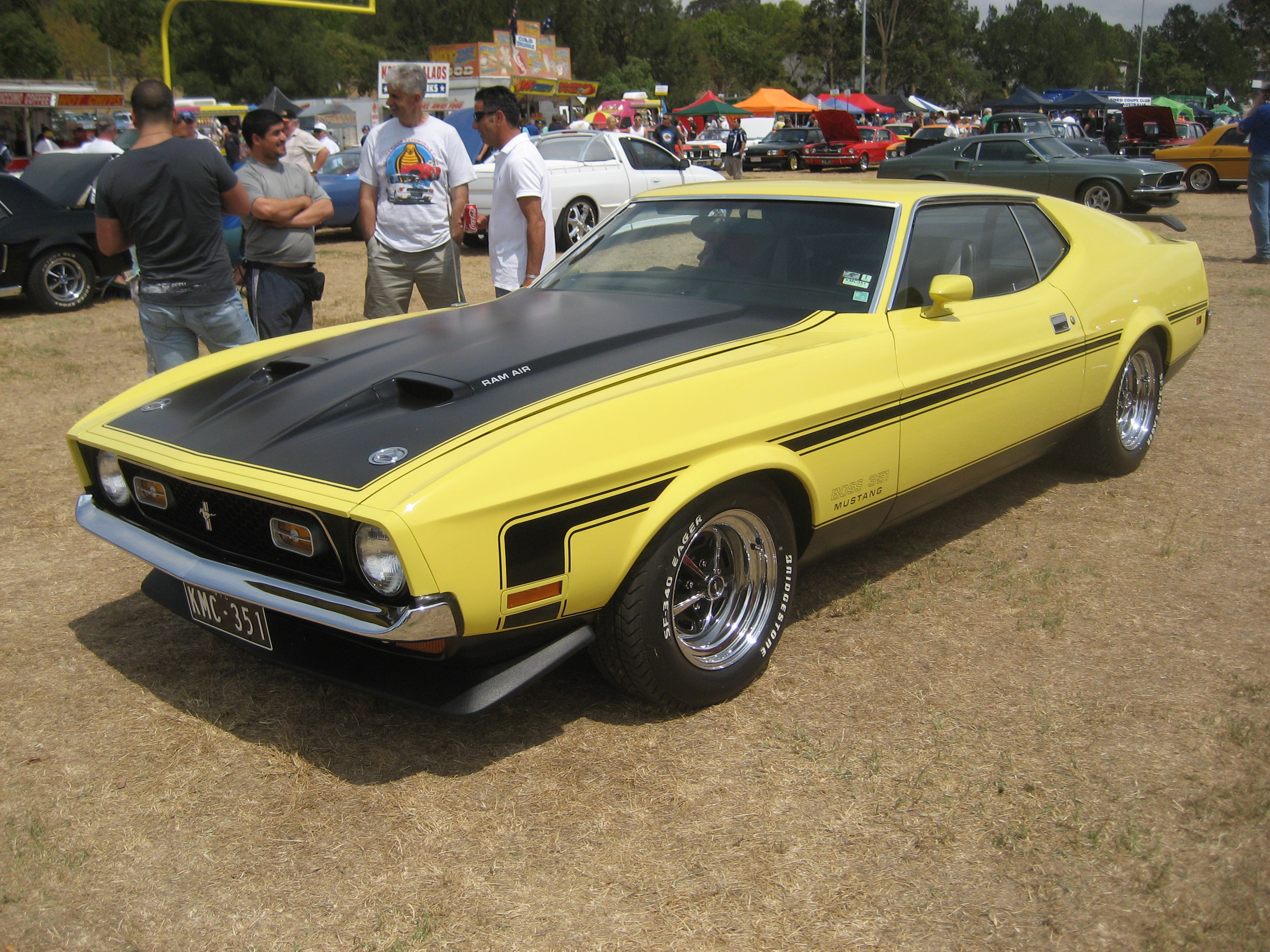
1971 Mustang Boss 351

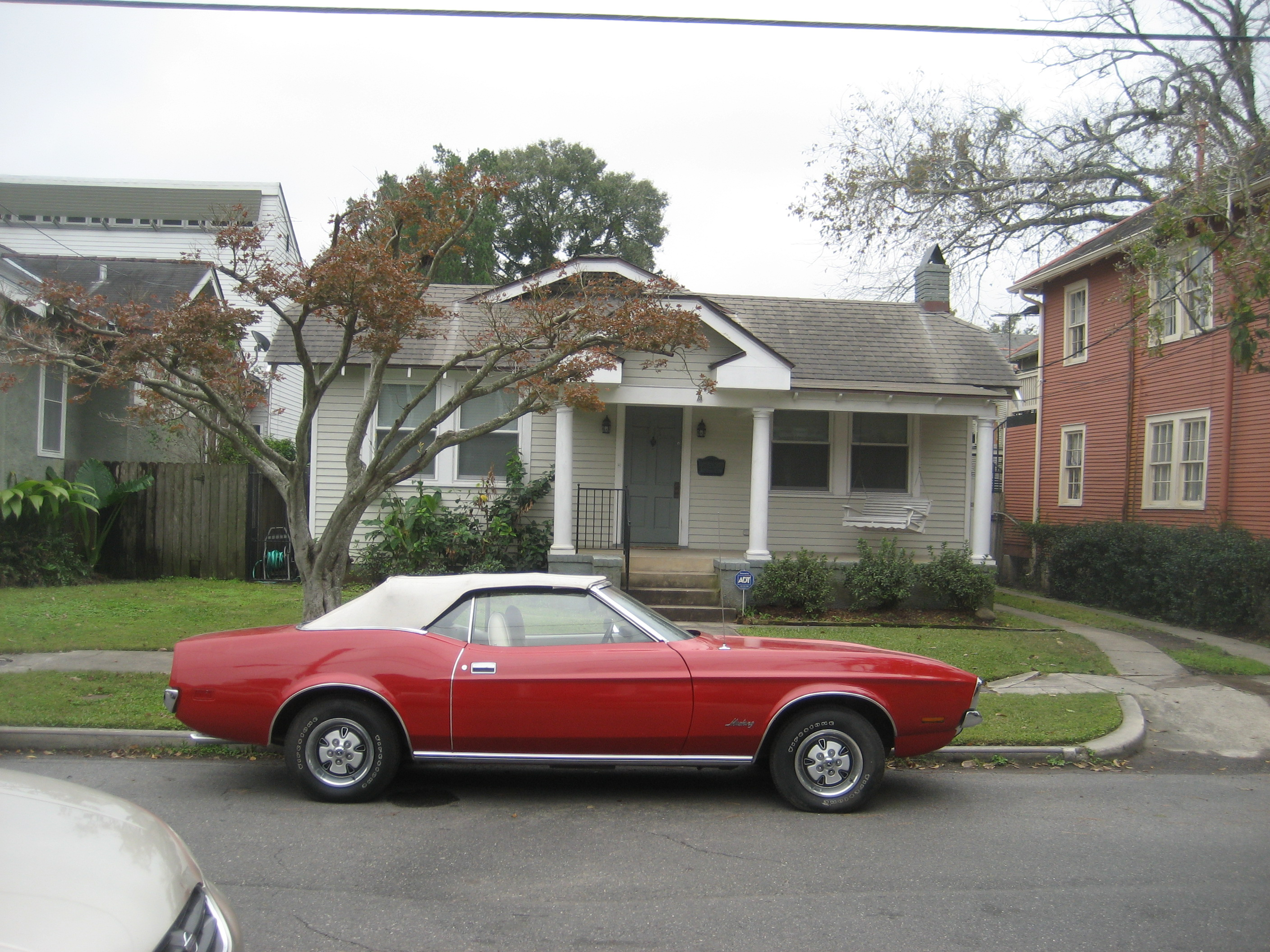
1971–1972 Mustang convertible

==== Hardtop ====
The new 1971 hardtop featured a prominent "tunnel back" rear window design with flowing rear pillars. Hardtops with 'Grande' trim gained a vinyl roof and Grande badges on the C-pillars.

An additional edition, the Spring Special, was available between March and May 1971, which added Mach 1 styling cues (side stripes, tu-tone paint, urethane bumper, honeycomb grille with sport lamps) to the hardtop.

==== SportsRoof ====
SportsRoof models were available in base configurations in addition to the Mach 1 and Boss 351 sport/performance options.

The Mach 1s were available with two-tone paint schemes, optional hockey-stick stripes, NACA (NASA) hood scoops (functional on 999 ordered with Ram Air), color-keyed side mirrors, and additional sports/performance options. All Mach 1 models came stock with urethane front bumpers and an alternate grille equipped with amber sportlights. Though the Mach 1 is often associated with the NACA hood (a no-cost option) and other styling cues, base Mach 1s could be had with the standard hood and the 302 2V engine.

Boss 351 models were similar in appearance to the Mach 1, and included a larger black-out hood than Mach 1's, front and rear spoilers, dual exhaust with no rear valance cutouts, and chrome bumpers paired with the sportlamp grille.

==== Convertible ====
Convertibles were equipped with a power top and a glass rear window. The 1973 models were the last Mustangs available as a convertible until the 1983 model year. Convertibles featured no unique exterior visual package of their own during their first year of introduction.

=== 1972 ===
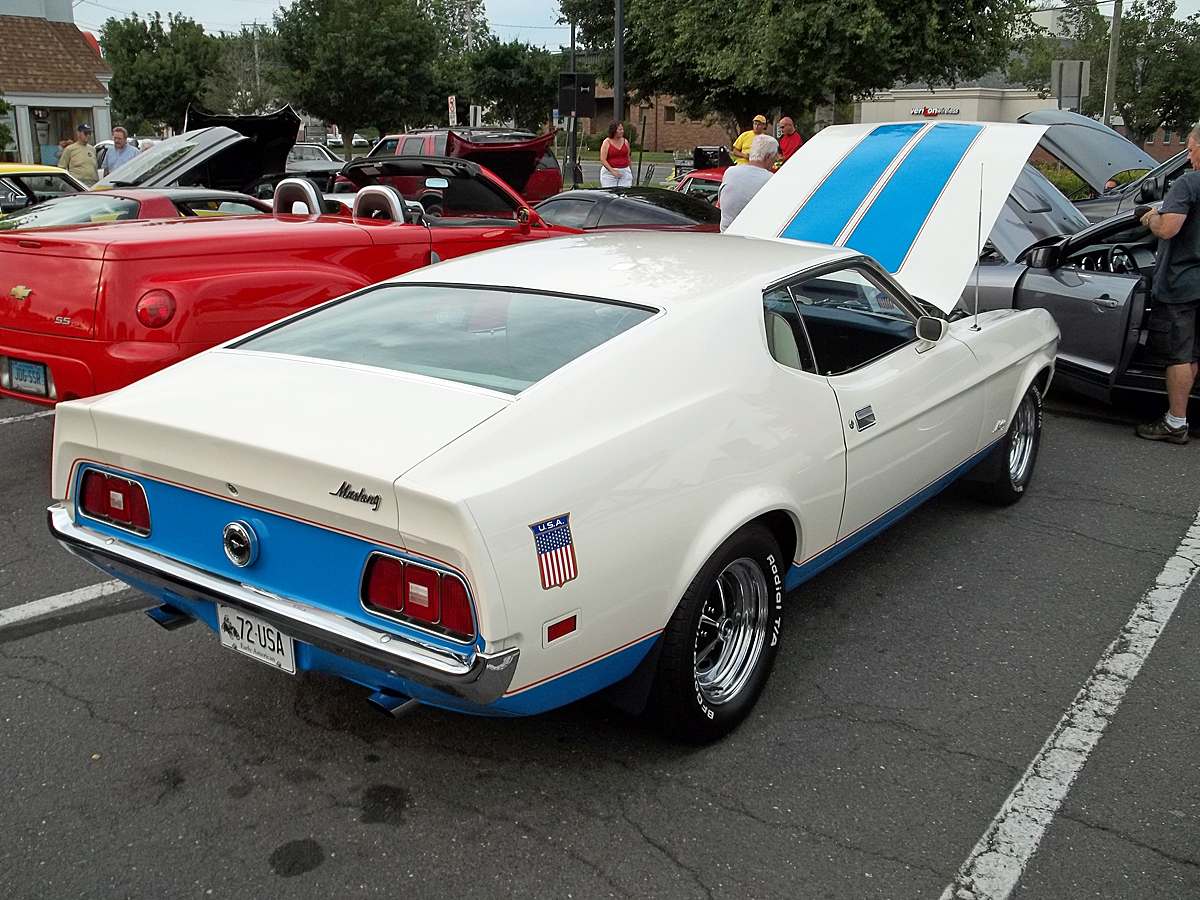
1972 Mustang SportsRoof Sprint edition

Due to tightening emissions regulations, the Boss 351 edition and optional 429 big block were dropped after 1971, leaving the 351 cu in (5.8 L) variants as the largest available engines for 1972 (and 1973).

Exterior differences were virtually unchanged, though all 1972 models were revised with "Fasten Seat Belt" warning lamps on the right side dash panel. The "Decor Group" exterior trim package was also revised, allowing coupe and convertible owners to option their car with two-tone lower body paint, plus the honeycomb sport lamp grille from the Mach 1/Boss 351 and the Mach 1's urethane bumper.

A commemorative Olympic Sprint Edition (also available on the Pinto and Maverick) was released between March and June of this year. Sprint editions were available in Hardtop and Sportsroof variants and featured white paint schemes with light blue accents and USA shield decals on the rear quarter panels. An additional 50 Sprint convertibles were produced exclusively for the 1972 National Cherry Blossom Parade in Washington D.C.

1972 saw the end of the special Ford muscle car performance engine era. At mid-year, Ford offered a slightly detuned Boss 351 engine, which could be ordered with any model. A total of 398 Mustangs were built with the drag race-oriented R code engine and were designated as the 351 HO. Mandatory options were the top loader 4-speed, competition N case rear end (427, 428, 429, Boss 351, 351HO), and air conditioning delete. Vacuum-operated Ram Air was not available. However, the HO came with the first full-time cold air induction system in a Mustang, routing cold air via a two-piece plastic duct under the battery tray to the air cleaner snorkel. All 351 HO cars were manufactured in Dearborn, MI.

=== 1973 ===
1973 brought some mild restyling. The urethane front bumper became standard and was enlarged following new NHTSA standards. All Mustang models had their sport lamps replaced with vertical turn signals, as the new bumper covered the previous turn signal locations in the front valance. Both a Mach 1 and base grille were offered, with differing insert patterns.

Mach 1 decals were also revised in 1972 for 1973 models, and the previous hockey stick side stripes of 1971–1972 models became an option on hardtops and convertibles with the addition of the 'Exterior Decor Group'. Magnum 500 wheels, previously optional, were superseded by forged aluminum 5-hole wheels.

The 1973 model year Mustang was the final version of the original pony car, as the model name migrated to the economy, Ford Pinto-based Mustang II the next year.

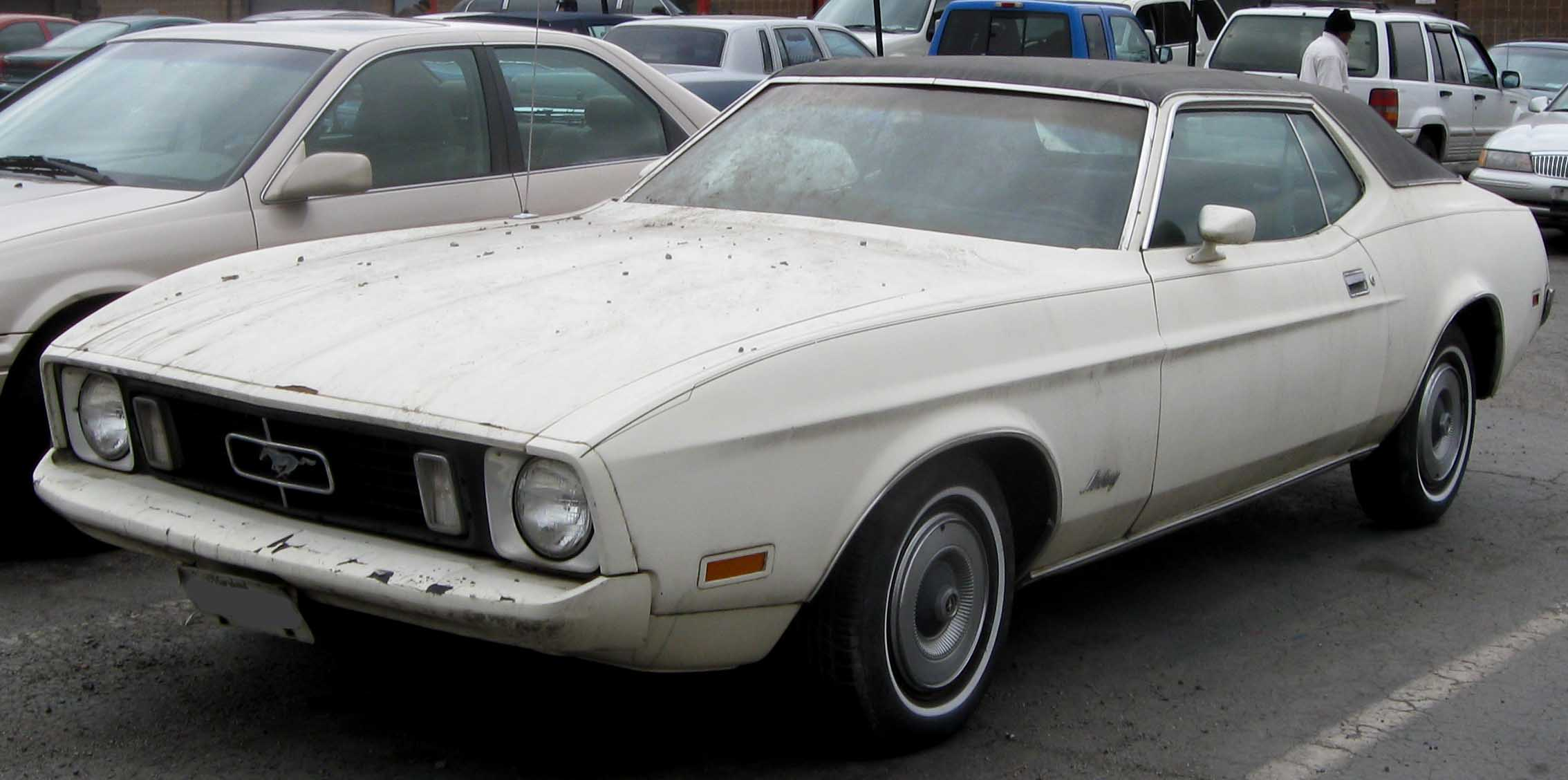
1973 Mustang hardtop with vinyl roof option

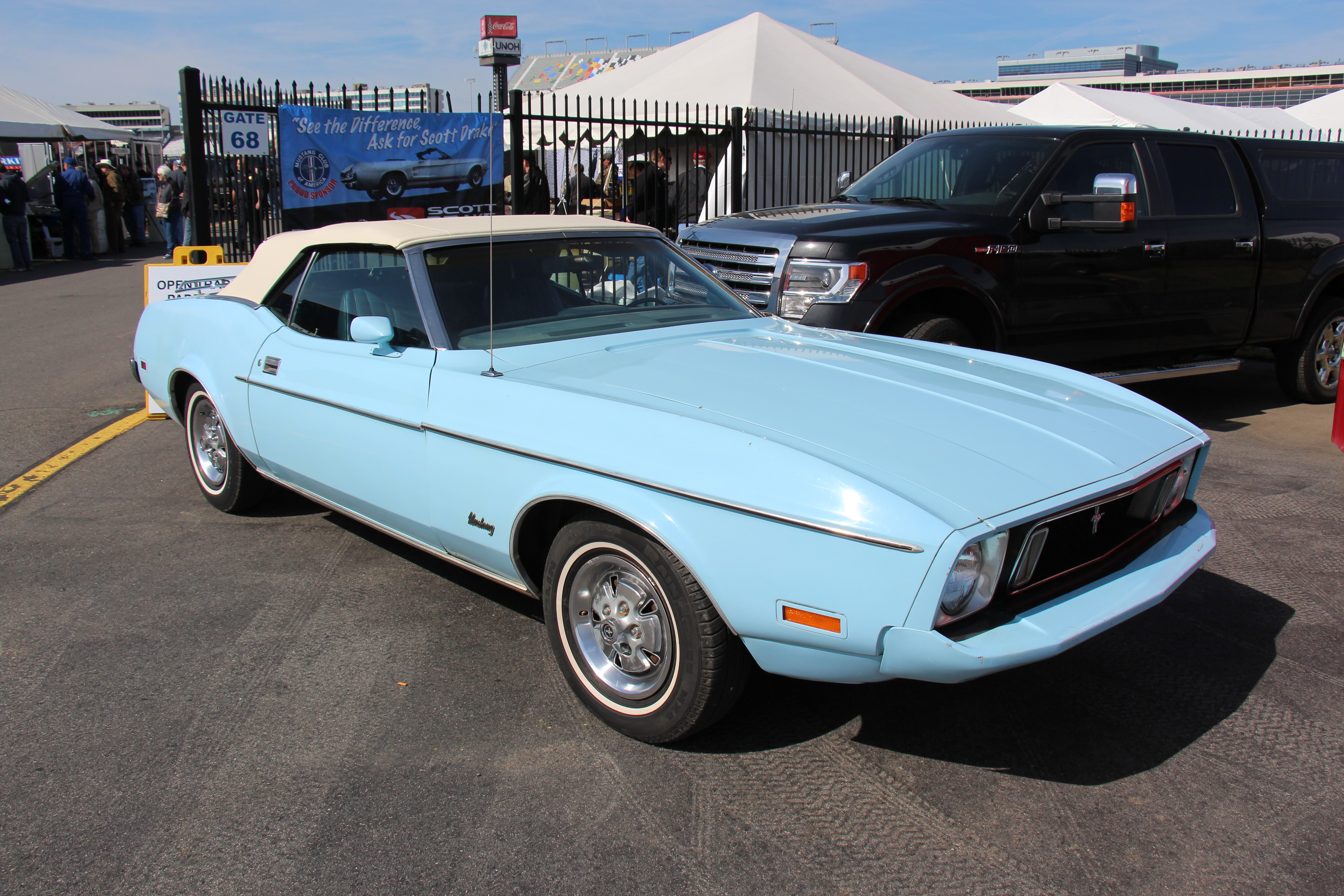
1973 Mustang Convertible

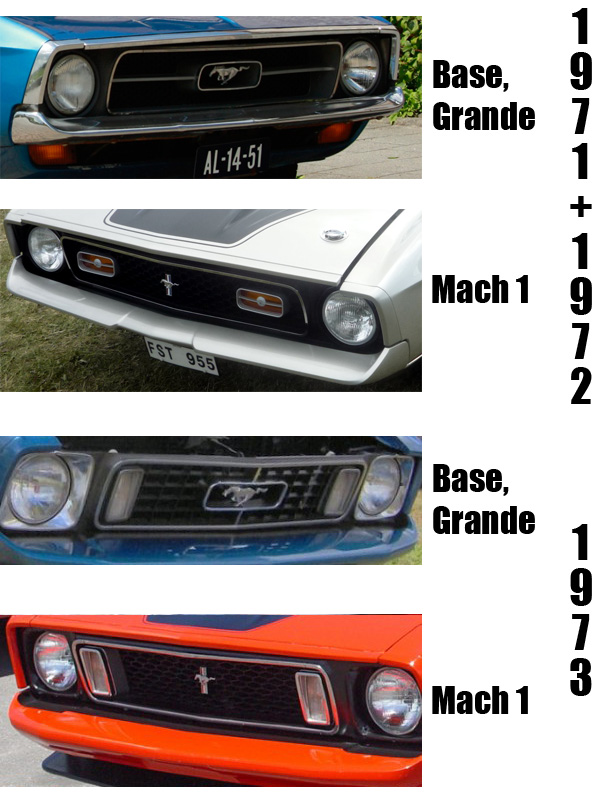
1971–1973 Mustang front end comparison

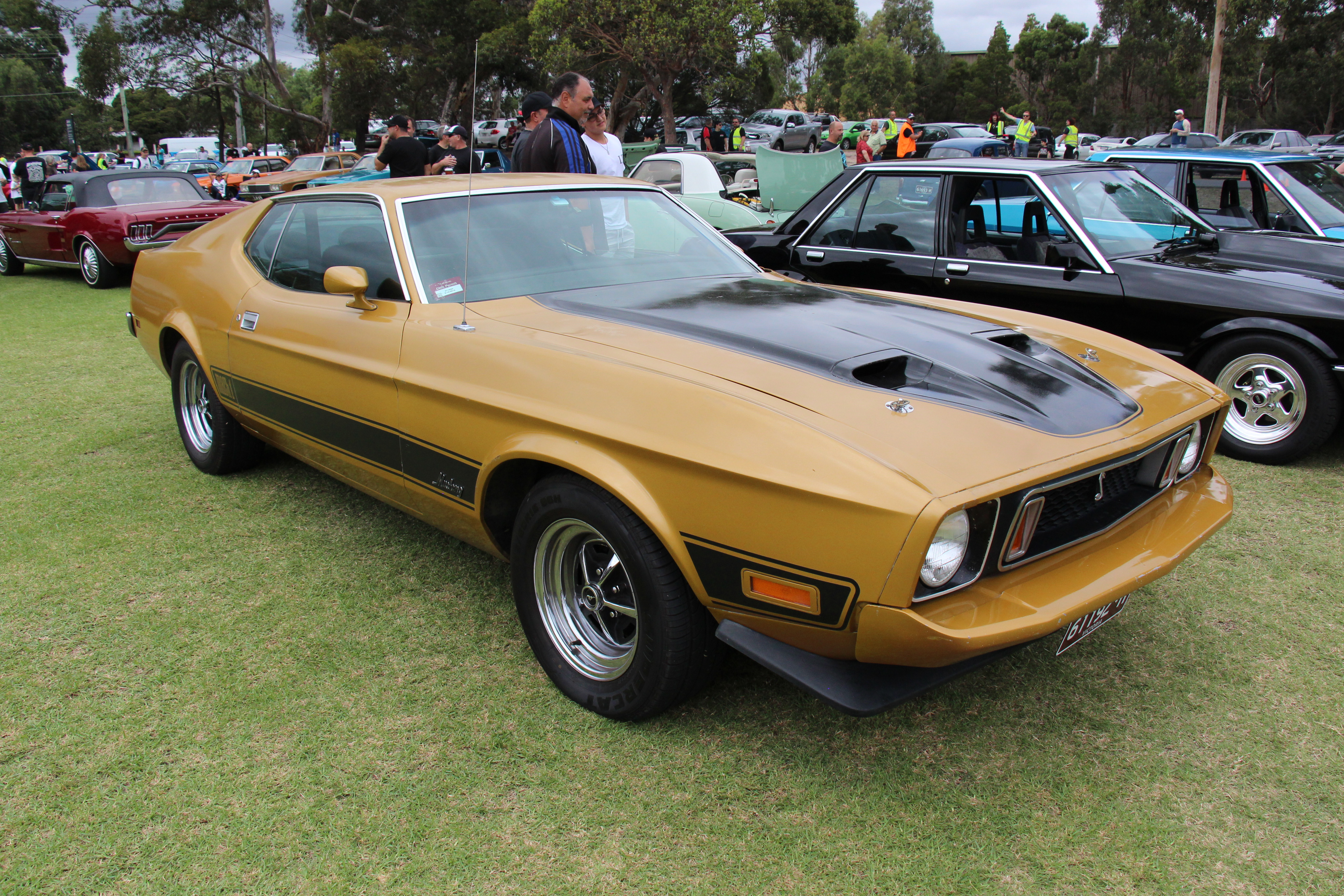
1973 Mustang Mach 1

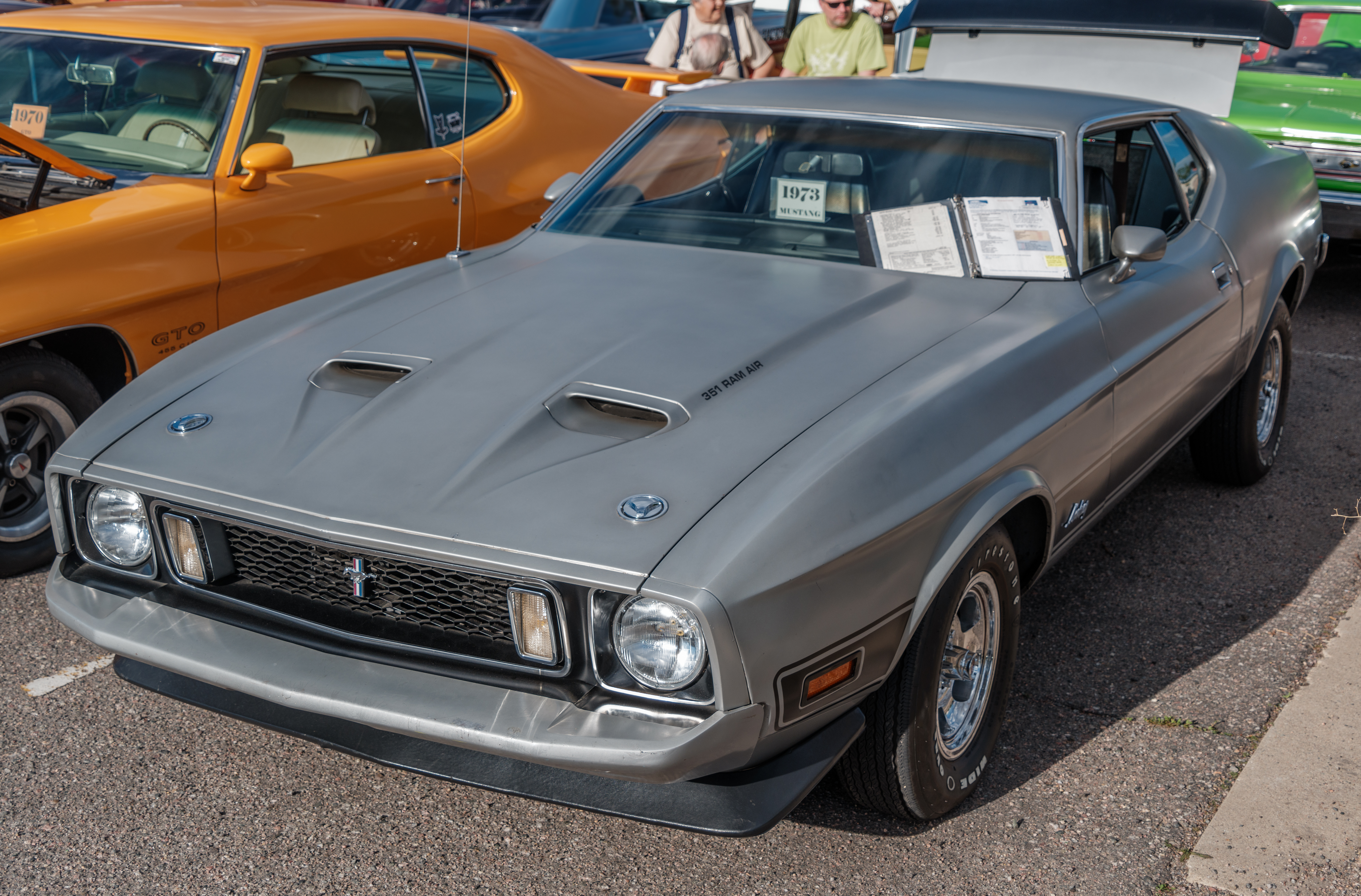
1973 Mustang Mach 1 with 5-hole wheels

=== Other variants ===
A small number of Mexican-produced cars were manufactured with the 'GT-351' trim package, under license by Shelby de Mexico. Additionally, 14 Shelby Europa vehicles were modified and decaled by Belgian Shelby dealer Claude Dubois for European clientele.

=== Engines ===
Automakers in the U.S. switched from gross to net power and torque ratings in 1972 (coinciding with the introduction of low-compression engines); thus, it is difficult to compare power and torque ratings between 1971 and 1972.

	engine displacement, type, carburetor type, VIN code	max. power at rpm	max. torque at rpm
1971	250 cu in (4.1 L) Thriftpower I6, 1-barrel Carter RBS, L-code	145 bhp (108 kW) at 4,000	232 lb⋅ft (315 N⋅m) at 2,600
1971	302 cu in (4.9 L) small block V8, 2-barrel Autolite 2100, F-code	210 bhp (157 kW) at 4,600	296 lb⋅ft (401 N⋅m) at 2,600
1971	351 cu in (5.8 L) Cleveland V8, 2-barrel Autolite 2100, H-code	240 bhp (179 kW) at 5,400	350 lb⋅ft (475 N⋅m) at 3,400
1971	351 cu in (5.8 L) Cleveland V8, 4-barrel Autolite 4300A, M-code	285 bhp (213 kW) at 5,400	370 lb⋅ft (502 N⋅m) at 3,400
1971	351 cu in (5.8 L) Cleveland CJ V8, 4-barrel Autolite 4300A, Q-code (late-MY1971 only; replacement for M-code)	285 bhp (213 kW) at 5,400	370 lb⋅ft (502 N⋅m) at 3,400
1971	351 cu in (5.8 L) Cleveland V8 4-barrel Autolite 4300D, R-code (Boss 351 only)	330 bhp (246 kW) at 5,400	370 lb⋅ft (502 N⋅m) at 4,000
1971	429 cu in (7.0 L) Cobra Jet V8, 4-barrel Rochester Quadrajet, C-code	370 bhp (276 kW) at 5,200	450 lb⋅ft (610 N⋅m) at 3,400
1971	429 cu in (7.0 L) Super Cobra Jet V8, 4-barrel Holley 4150 (780 CFM), J-code	375 bhp (280 kW) at 5,200	450 lb⋅ft (610 N⋅m) at 3,400
1972	250 cu in (4.1 L) Thriftpower I6, 1-barrel Carter RBS, L-code	95 bhp (71 kW) at 3,400	197 lb⋅ft (267 N⋅m) at 1,600
1972	302 cu in (4.9 L) small block V8, 2-barrel Autolite 2100, F-code	140 bhp (104 kW) at 4,000	239 lb⋅ft (324 N⋅m) at 2,000
1972	351 cu in (5.8 L) Cleveland V8, 2-barrel Autolite 2100, H-code	177 bhp (132 kW) at 4,000	284 lb⋅ft (385 N⋅m) at 2,000
1972	351 cu in (5.8 L) Cleveland CJ V8, 4-barrel Autolite 4300D, Q-code	266 bhp (198 kW) at 5,400	301 lb⋅ft (408 N⋅m) at 3,600
1972	351 cu in (5.8 L) Cleveland HO V8, 4-barrel Autolite 4300D, R-code	275 bhp (205 kW) at 6,000	286 lb⋅ft (388 N⋅m) at 3,800
1973	250 cu in (4.1 L) Thriftpower I6, 1-barrel Carter RBS, L-code	98 bhp (73 kW) at 3,400	197 lb⋅ft (267 N⋅m) at 1,600
1973	302 cu in (4.9 L) small block V8, 2-barrel Autolite 2100, F-code	140 bhp (104 kW) at 4,000	239 lb⋅ft (324 N⋅m) at 2,000
1973	351 cu in (5.8 L) Cleveland V8, 2-barrel Autolite 2100, H-code	177 bhp (132 kW) at 4,000	284 lb⋅ft (385 N⋅m) at 2,000
1973	351 cu in (5.8 L) Cleveland CJ V8, 4-barrel Autolite 4300D, Q-code	266 bhp (198 kW) at 5,400	301 lb⋅ft (408 N⋅m) at 3,600

== Production numbers ==
In 1964, Mustang sales started with 22,000 orders taken on the first day at the World's Fair and around the United States. In the first two years of production, three Ford Motor Company plants in Milpitas, California; Dearborn, Michigan; and Metuchen, New Jersey produced almost 1.3 million Mustangs.

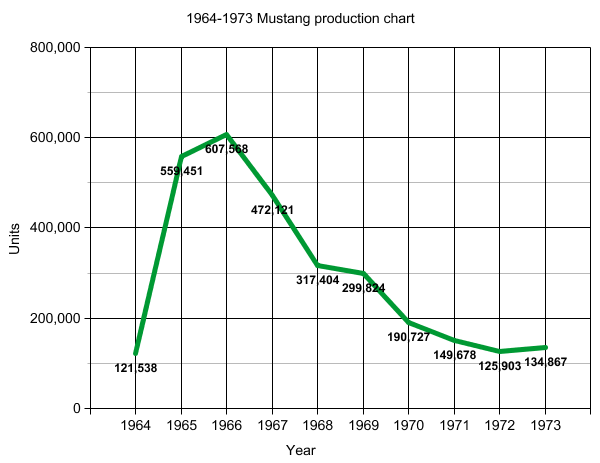

From 1965, the Mustang was also made at the La Villa plant in Mexico. Initially, only the hardtop with a 289 V8 engine was made there. The 351 was added in 1970 and the Mach 1 fastback was added in 1973..

Production numbers (calendar years)
Type	1965	1966
Convertible, standard	65,663	56,409
Convertible, bench seat	2,111	3,190
Convertible, luxury	5,338	12,520
Coupe, standard	372,123	422,416
Coupe, bench seat	14,905	21,397
Coupe, luxury	22,232	55,938
Fastback, standard	71,303	27,809
Fastback, luxury, non-GT	3,987	7,889
Fastback, luxury, GT	1,789	7,889
Total	559,451	607,568

== See also ==
- Ford Mustang
- Ford Mustang Mach 1
- Shelby Mustang
