= Ford Mustang Mach 1 =

American muscle car

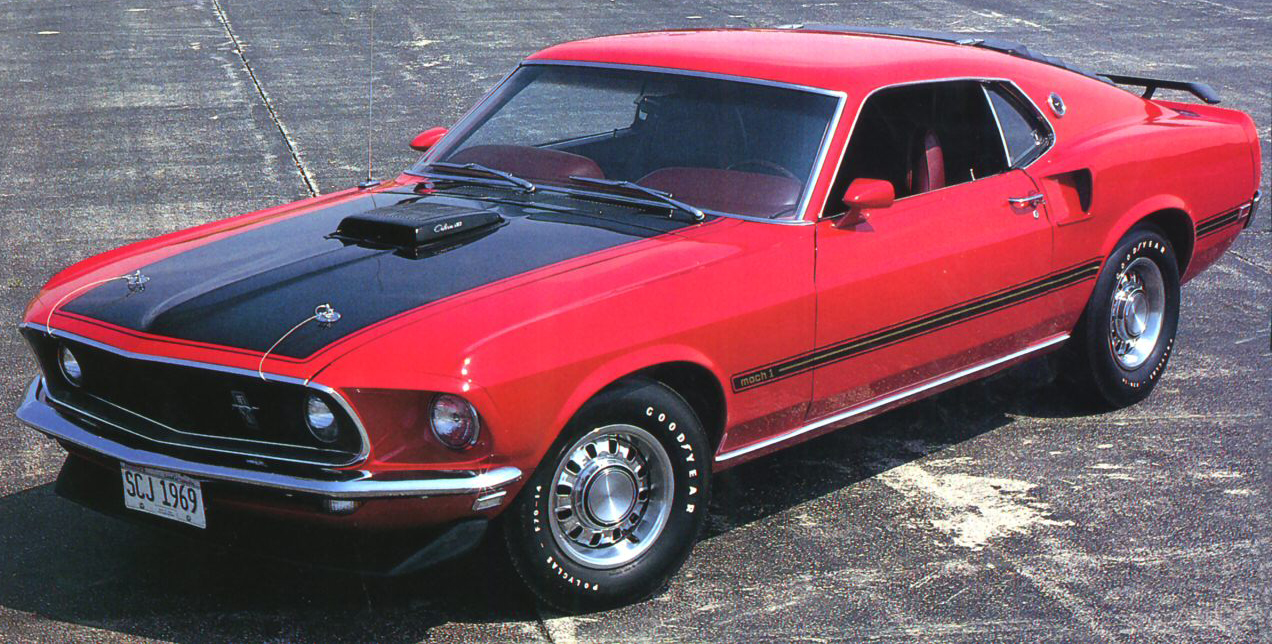

Overview
- Manufacturer: Ford
- Production: 1969–1978; 2003–2004; 2021–2023
- Assembly: United States: Dearborn, Michigan (Ford River Rouge complex)

Body and chassis
- Class: Pony car, Muscle car
- Body style: 2-door coupe
- Layout: FR layout

The Ford Mustang Mach 1 is a combination performance and appearance package offered as an option for the Ford Mustang. It first appeared in August 1968 for the 1969 model year, and ran through 1978. After a long hiatus it briefly returned in 2003 to 2004, and most recently between 2021 and 2023.

The first generation of the package, available with various engines, debuted at its hottest, then was progressively eroded in performance as emissions controls, unleaded gas, fleet mileage quotas, and higher gasoline prices undercut the "horsepower wars" that had originally spurred the option. Similarly, early packages included other performance upgrades, such as suspension, that were deleted in subsequent model runs, leaving only a wide array of external and interior upgrades.

As part of a Ford heritage program, the Mach 1 package returned in 2003 as a high-performance version of the New Edge platform. Visual elements paying homage to the 1969 model were integrated into the design. This generation of the Mach 1 was discontinued after the 2004 model year, with the introduction of the fifth generation Mustang.

The Mach 1 returned again in 2021 in the sixth generation Mustang, offering marginally more power than the high-performance 5.0 L Coyote V-8 in the base GT V8, but borrowing front and rear subframes from the Shelby GT350 and various parts from it and the Shelby GT 500 models. It was produced until the debut of the seventh generation Mustang following the 2023 model year.

== Introduction ==
The performance of pony cars became a major arena of competition, both for sales and manufacturer prestige. As the horsepower war escalated, the Ford Mustang platform and engine bay were redesigned to accommodate larger engine blocks. Late in the 1968 model year, Ford introduced the 428 cu in (7.0 L) Cobra Jet FE engine in a small group of Mustang GTs and the 1968 Shelby GT500KR, its largest and most potent performance engine. For the 1969 model year, Ford produced an overall "performance package", which was available with two smaller V8s - the 351 cu in (5.8 L) Windsor (standard) and 390 cu in (6.4 L) FE, and topped by the Cobra Jet. It included some additional handling upgrades and heavy appearance enhancements and was dubbed the "Mach 1".

== First generation (1969–1970) ==
First generation
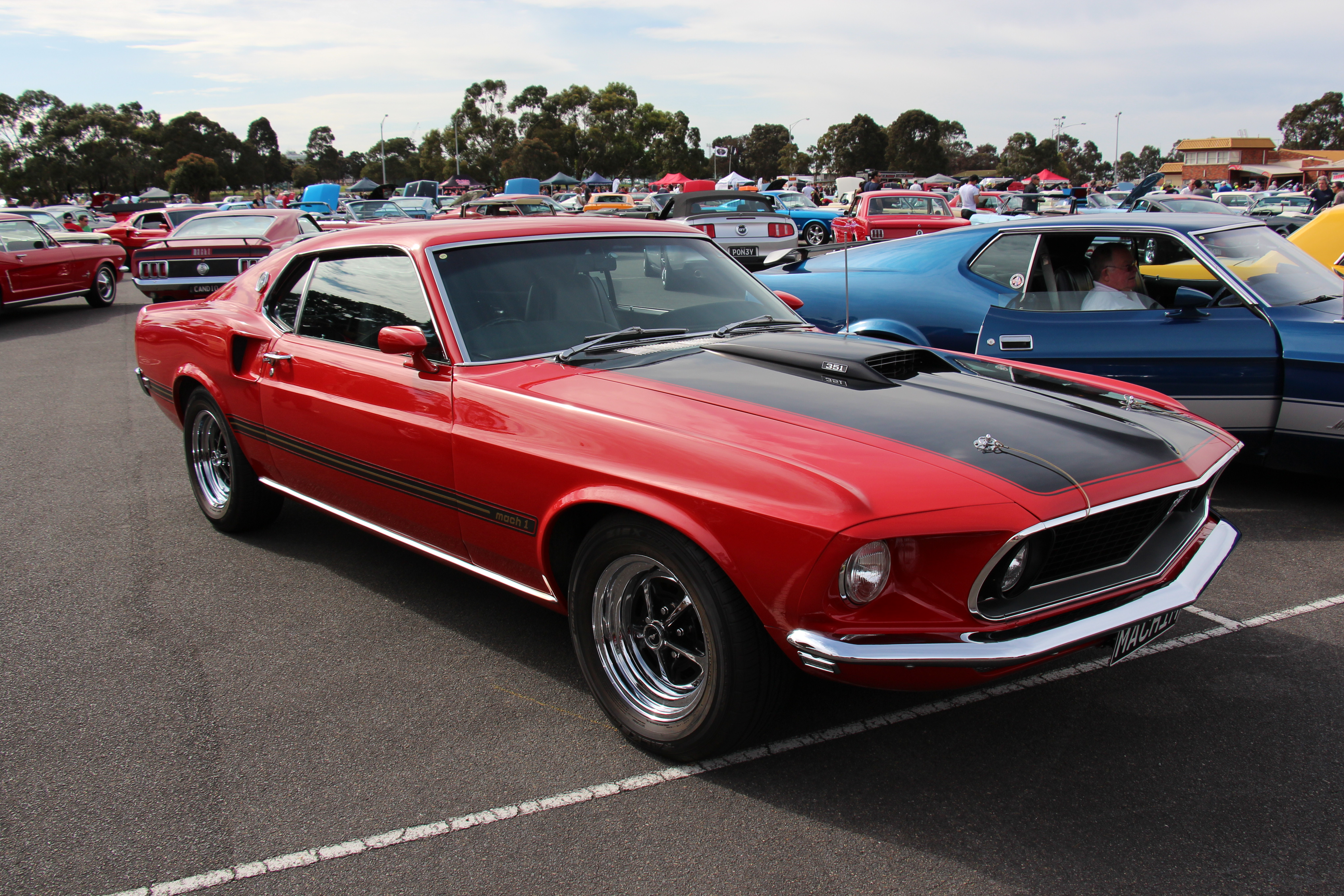
- 1969 Ford Mustang Mach 1

Overview
- Production: 1969–1970

Body and chassis
- Body style: 2-door fastback

Powertrain
- Engine: 351 cu in (5.8 L) Windsor V8; 351 cu in (5.8 L) Cleveland V8; 390 cu in (6.4 L) FE V8; 428 cu in (7.0 L) CJ/SCJ V8
- Transmission: 3-speed automatic; 3-speed manual 4-speed manual

The 1969 Ford Mustang featured numerous performance-themed model names and engines. Six factory performance Mustang models were available (GT, Boss 302, Boss 429, Shelby GT350, Shelby GT500, and the Mach 1). Additionally, seven variations of V8s were available in the 1969 through 1973 models; most of these were also available in the new Mach 1.

Due to the success of the Mach 1, the GT model was discontinued after 1969 following poor sales of 5,396 units versus the 72,458 sales for the Mach 1. The Mustang would not have the "GT" badge until 1982.

The Mach 1 package was only available in the "SportsRoof" fastback body style (previously known as the 'fastback'). It included visual and performance-enhancing items such as matte black hood treatment with hood pins, hood scoop (including optional Shaker scoop), competition suspension, chrome pop-open gas cap, revised wheels with Goodyear Polyglas tires, chrome exhaust tips (except 351W 2V), deluxe interior, factory or dealer optional chin spoiler, rear deck spoiler, and rear window louvers (SportSlats).

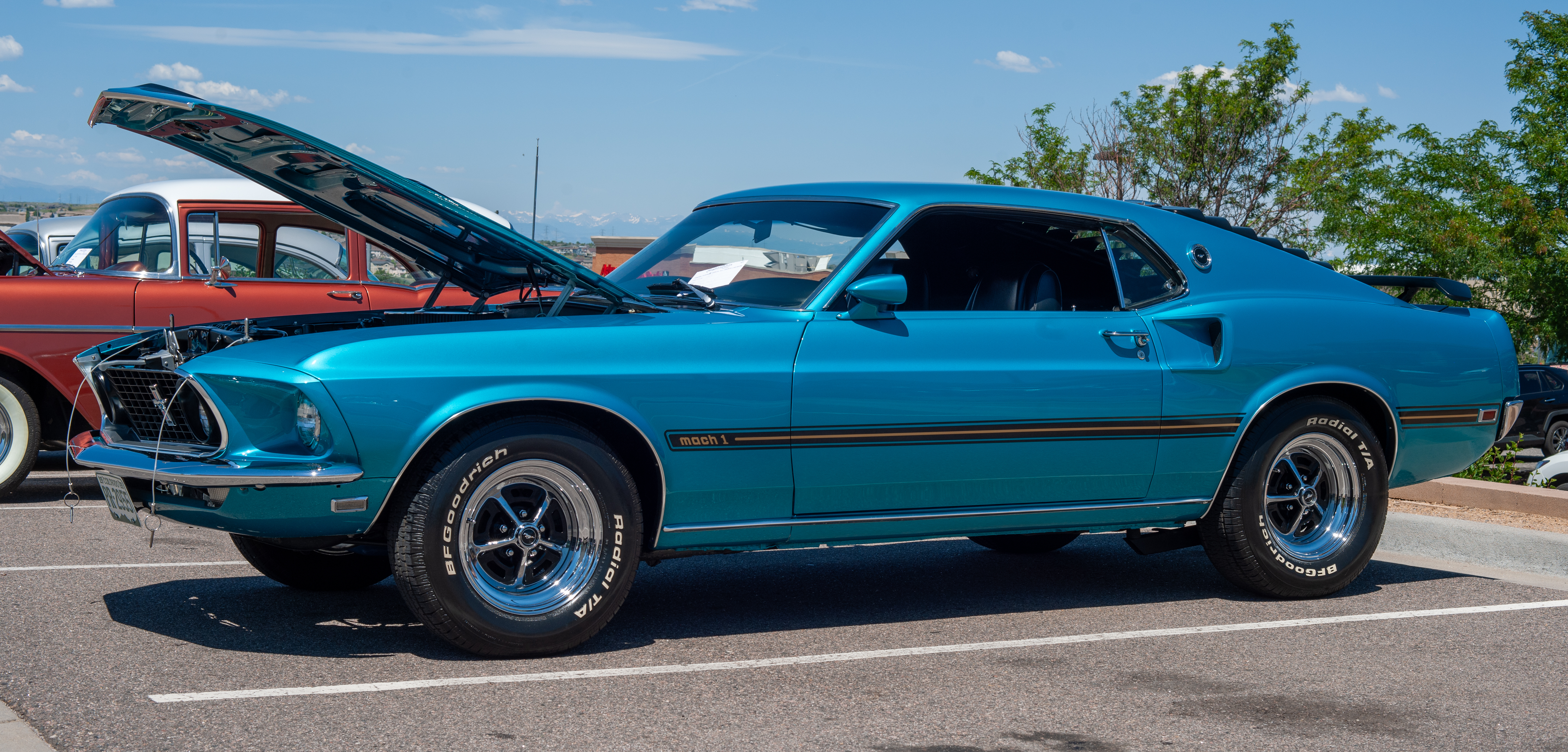
1969 Ford Mustang Mach 1 in Gulf Stream Aqua

Standard equipment was a 351 cu in (5.8 L) Windsor (351W) 2V 2-barrel engine with a 3-speed manual transmission, and a 9-inch (23 cm) 28 spline open rear axle. A 351W 4V 4-barrel was optional as was a 390 cu in (6.4 L) FE, and the 428 cu in (7.0 L) Cobra Jet 4V with or without Ram Air, and a "drag pack" option with the modified 428 cu in (7.0 L) Super Cobra Jet engine. A 4-speed manual or 3-speed FMX (small block)/C6 (big block) automatic transmission was optional, and the 428SCJ added a cast iron tailshaft in place of the regular aluminum one to the C6. A "traction lok" rear axle was optional, and the 428 CJ/SCJ included a "traction lok" with a 3.91 or 4.30 ratio, 31 spline axle shafts, and a nodular case. In 1970, the 3.91 ratio was a "traction-lok", while the 4.30 ratio was a Detroit Locker.

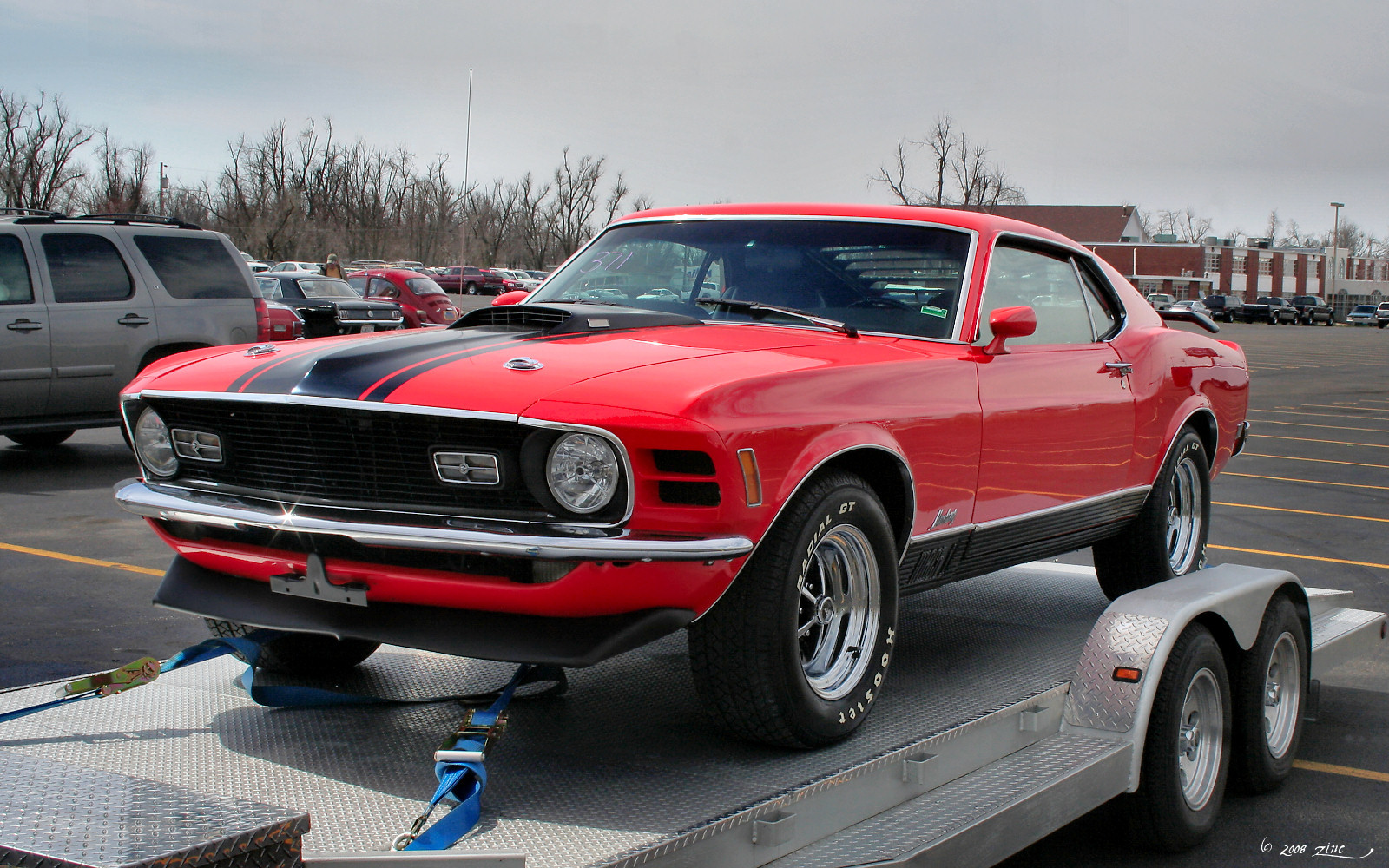
1970 Ford Mustang Mach 1

The Mach 1 came with upgraded suspension to varying degrees dependent upon powertrain choices. Big block cars had front shock tower reinforcement, thicker sway bars (no rear bar for 1969), and heavier springs and shocks. The 428 CJ/SCJ 4-speed cars also came with staggered rear shocks. Standard on Mach 1s was a non-functional hood scoop that had turn-signal indicator lights on the back visible to the driver. Optional was the "shaker hood" named for the functional air scoop that tended to move with the engine because it was mounted directly to the top of the engine. The interior featured simulated teak wood grain details, full sound-deadening material, and high-back sport bucket seats.

In 1968, racecar drivers Mickey Thompson and Danny Ongais took three Mach 1 Mustangs to the Bonneville salt flats for a feature in Hot Rod magazine, in the process setting 295 speed and endurance records over a series of 500-mile and 24-hour courses.

Ford kept the Mach 1 in production into 1970 with a few appearance changes. These included single dual-beam headlights with the position of the previous inner high-beam lights becoming sport lamps, the taillights were recessed on a black honeycomb rear panel, the simulated side scoops behind both doors were removed, the bucket seats were revised, new deep dish sports wheel covers, while the side and rear badging and striping were new. The 1970 model year used the Windsor 2V engine on some earlier built cars until the new 351 cu in (5.8 L) Cleveland (351C) V8 in either 2V (for use with 2-venturi carbs) or 4V (for use with 4-venturi carbs) versions became available. The 351C 4V (M code) engine featured 11.0:1 compression and produced 300 bhp (224 kW; 304 PS) at 5400 rpm. This new engine incorporated elements from the Ford 385 series engine and the Boss 302, particularly the poly-angle combustion chambers with canted valves and the thin-wall casting technology.

=== Engines ===
Engine displacement, type, carburetor, VIN code	Max horsepower at rpm	Max torque at rpm
351 cu in (5.8 L) Windsor V8 (1969) 2-barrel H-Code	250 bhp (186 kW; 253 PS) @ 4,600	355 lb⋅ft (481 N⋅m) @ 2,600
351 cu in (5.8 L) Cleveland V8 (1970) 2-barrel H-Code	250 bhp (186 kW; 253 PS) @ 5,400	355 lb⋅ft (481 N⋅m) @ 3,400
351 cu in (5.8 L) Windsor V8 (1969) 4-barrel M-Code	290 bhp (216 kW; 294 PS) @ 4,800	385 lb⋅ft (522 N⋅m) @ 3,200
351 cu in (5.8 L) Cleveland V8 (1970) 4-barrel M-Code	300 bhp (224 kW; 304 PS) @ 5,400	385 lb⋅ft (522 N⋅m) @ 3,400
390 cu in (6.4 L) FE V8 (1969) 4-barrel S-Code	320 bhp (239 kW; 324 PS) @ 4,600	427 lb⋅ft (579 N⋅m) @ 3,200
428 cu in (7.0 L) Non-Ram Air Cobra Jet & Super Cobra Jet V8 (1969–1970) 4-barrel Q-Code	335 bhp (250 kW; 340 PS) @ 5,200	440 lb⋅ft (597 N⋅m) @ 3,400
428 cu in (7.0 L) Ram Air Cobra Jet & Super Cobra Jet V8 (1969–1970) 4-barrel R-Code	335 bhp (250 kW; 340 PS) @ 5,200	440 lb⋅ft (597 N⋅m) @ 3,400

== First generation facelift (1971–1973) ==
First generation midcycle update (facelift)
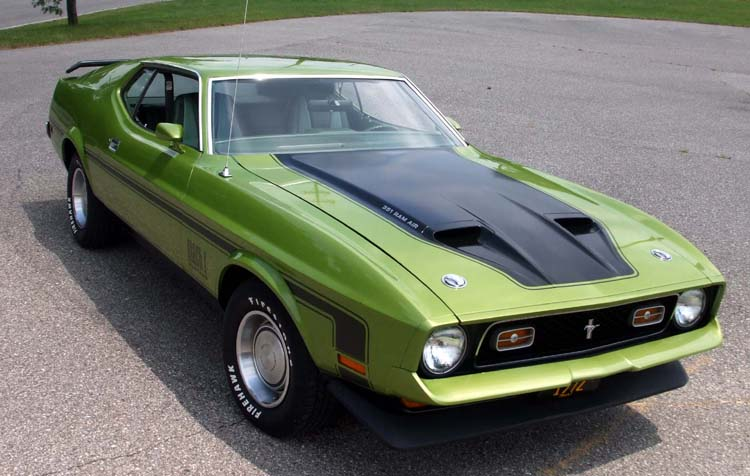
- 1972 Ford Mustang Mach 1

Overview
- Production: 1971–1973

Body and chassis
- Body style: 2-door coupe

Powertrain
- Engine: 302 cu in (4.9 L) Windsor V8; 351 cu in (5.8 L) Cleveland V8; 351 cu in (5.8 L) CJ V8; 429 cu in (7.0 L) CJ/SCJ V8
- Transmission: 3-speed C4 automatic; 3-speed C6 automatic; 3-speed FMX automatic; 3-speed manual; 4-speed manual

For the 1971 model year, the standard content on the Mach 1 was reduced. Included were:

- SportsRoof body style with unique "05" VIN code & "63R" body code on the door tag
- Color-keyed urethane front "spoiler" bumper & front fender and hood trim
- Honeycomb grille in black w/sportlamps
- Argent or black "Mach 1 – MUSTANG" decals on fenders
- Argent or black stripe and "Mach 1" decal on the trunk lid
- Argent or black lower body accent paint
- Bright trim at lower body paint line
- E70-14 white sidewall tires w/ hub caps & trim rings on 7" wide steel wheels
- Color-keyed dual racing mirror w/driver side remote
- Honeycomb taillight panel applique with bright trim
- Unique pop-open gas cap
- F-code 302-2V engine w/3 speed manual transmission
- Competition Suspension (HD springs & shocks), variable quick-ratio steering box if ordered with P/S
- Base Mustang vinyl interior
- Flat hood – the NACA scooped hood was a no-cost option for the base engine

In 1971, the Mach 1 was available with a 302 Windsor engine, the F-code, and three 351 Cleveland engines; the H-code 2-V, the M-code 4-V, and beginning in May 1971, the Q-code 351CJ (Cobra Jet or GT engine). M & Q code engines were produced concurrently up until the end of 71 model year production. There were also two 429ci options, the C-code CJ (Cobra Jet) & J-code CJ-R (Cobra Jet – Ram Air). Buying the optional "Drag Pak" 3.91 (V) or 4.11 (Y) rear gears turned either 429 into a "Super Cobra Jet", with a solid lifter cam, Holley 780cfm carb and special rotating assembly with forged pistons.

One of the most recognizable features of the 1971–1973 Mach 1 is the hood design with dual scoops. The hood was a no-cost option on the 302 cars and standard on all others. The basic hood had non-functional NACA-style submerged ducts, but when ordered with the Ram Air option, it became functional. It included a vacuum-controlled door inside each scoop, and a fiberglass under-hood 'plenum' that directed cool, outside air through a modified, rubber-ringed air filter housing and into the carburetor. Ram-air also included a pair of 1970 Mach1-style chrome twist hood locks and a two-tone hood paint treatment in either 'matte black' or 'argent' (matte silver), which coordinated with the decals and striping. The option also received either a "351 RAM AIR" or "429 RAM AIR" decal on each side of the hood.

In 1972, the 429CJ & SCJ engines were dropped from the lineup, and horsepower ratings dropped across the board due to the switch to new SAE net horsepower calculations and a 4-degree camshaft retard built into the timing set. This year also produced the fewest Mach 1 sales of the 1971–73 generation. There are no major external differences in the 1971 and 1972 Mach 1 models. The 1972 Mach 1 also saw the deletion of the pop-open gas cap, which was replaced with the standard twist-on cap found on the other Mustang models that year. The 302 Windsor remained as the base Mach 1 engine. There were again three 351 Cleveland engine options for 1972. A 2-barrel, the 4-barrel 351CJ, and a new R-code 351HO, essentially a lower compression Boss 351 engine.

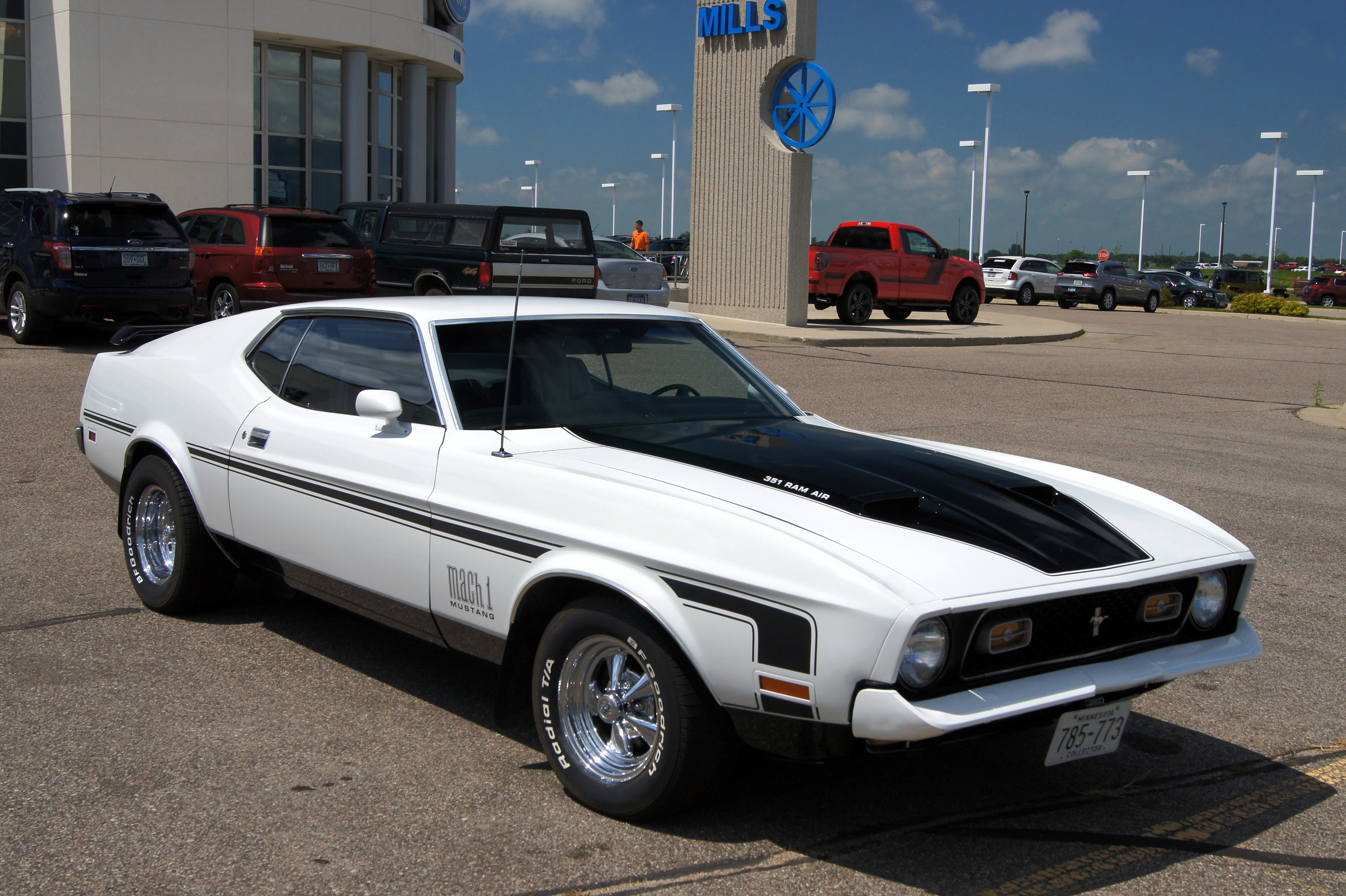
1971 Ford Mustang Mach 1

The Mach 1 received appearance updates for 1973. The lower body accent paint and bright trim were gone and the entire car was one color from top to bottom. All 1973 Mach 1s received a wide body-side tape stripe in either black or argent, that featured a "MACH 1" cutout on the front of the quarter panel, and a standard "MUSTANG" script emblem on the fender. The deck lid tape stripe was revised, with the "MACH 1" lettering incorporated into the passenger side of the stripe instead of centered above it as in 1971 and 1972. The valance cutouts and bright tips were no longer available on 4V cars for 1973.

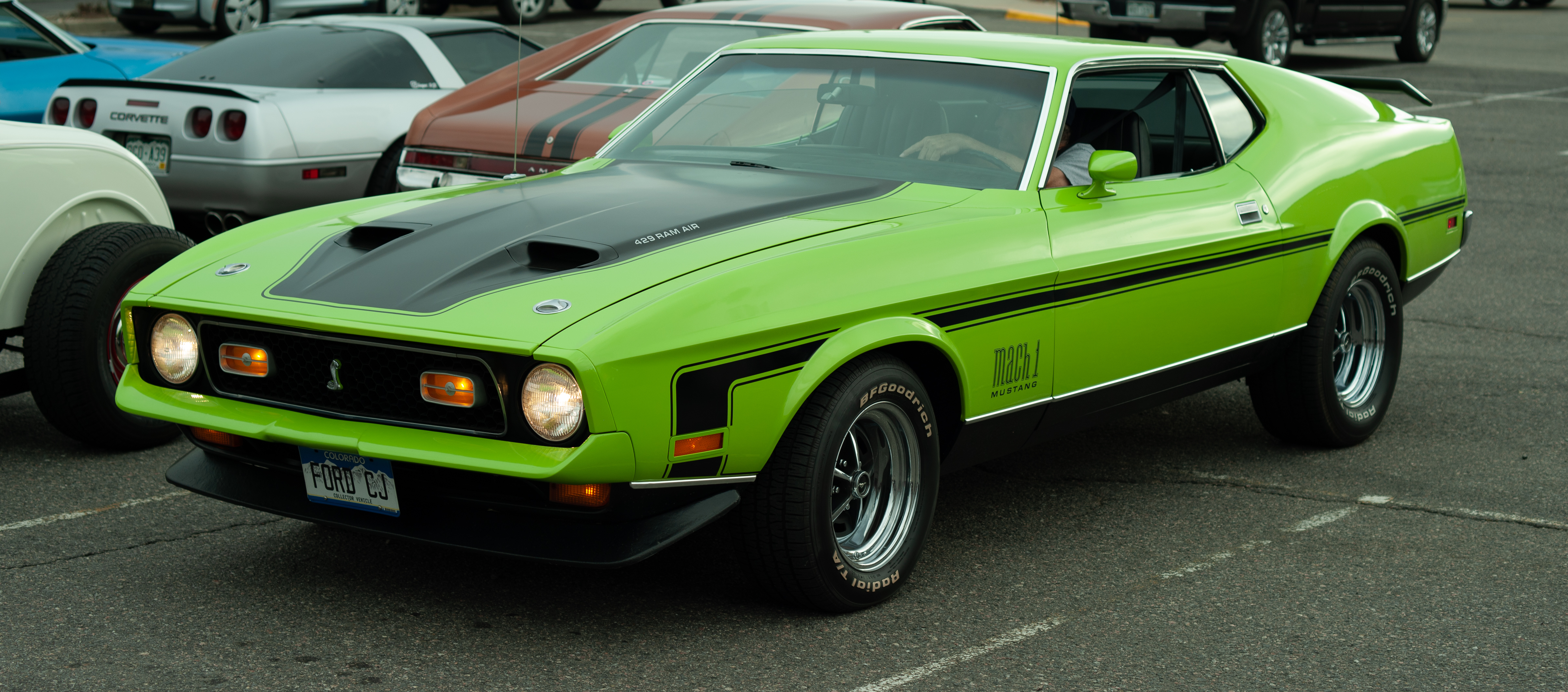
1971 Mach 1 429 Cobra Jet

The Mustang needed to comply with new NHTSA standards, which necessitated a redesigned front and rear bumper. The front bumper on all models became a much larger body-colored urethane unit, mounted on impact-absorbing struts. Due to the revised bumper, the Mach 1 sport lamps were deleted and all models had the park/turn signal lamps moved from the front valance up to a vertical orientation at each end of the grille. The Mach 1 grille was black with a honeycomb pattern and a small running horse tri-bar emblem. The rear bumper was mounted on extended brackets which caused the bumper to protrude from the body further. A body-colored urethane filler piece at each quarter panel was added while a sheet metal filler panel was bolted to the taillight panel.

Engine options remained virtually the same as in 1972, except the 351HO engine was dropped. The 351-4V was not advertised in the 1973 Mustang as a Cobra Jet engine even though the 1973 Ford shop manual and other internal Ford documentation referenced the engine as the 351-4V CJ since the "Cobra Jet" nomenclature continued in Torino, Cougar, and Montego lines.

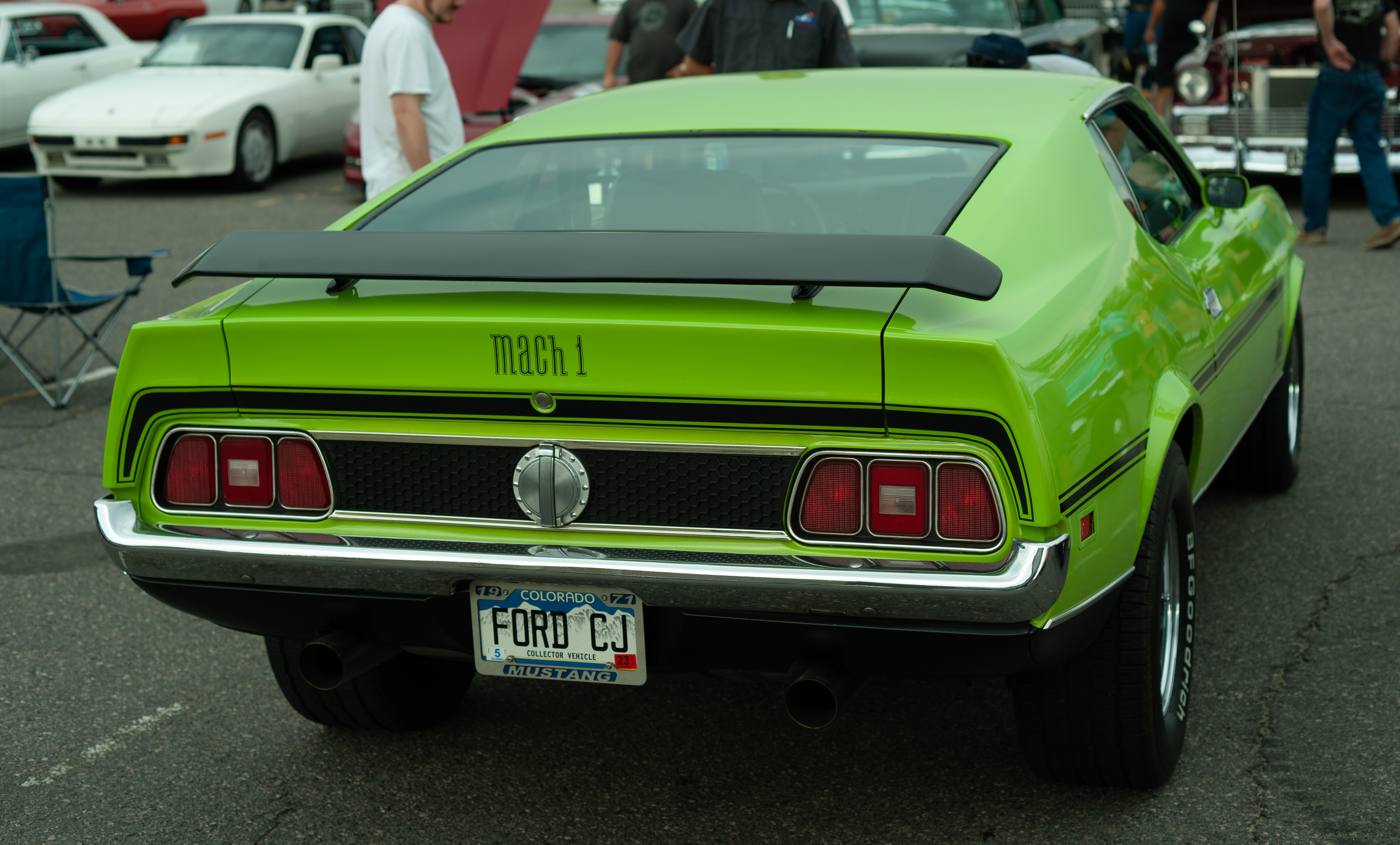
1971 Mach 1 Cobra Jet 429

Because of problems with having the Ram Air option approved for emissions reasons, the 351-2V was the only engine available with Ram Air. A "Tu-Tone" hood paint treatment option that consisted of the black or argent paint treatment and twist locks was offered, but without the actual functional components of the Ram Air system.

=== Engines ===
The chart does not reflect the Boss 351 variant of the 351 Cleveland or 250 cu in I6, as neither were available in the Mach 1 package.

The 1972 R-code 351HO package – essentially the solid-lifter Boss 351 engine from 1971 with a reduction in compression from 11.0:1 to 8.8:1 – is listed here, as it was available with the Mach 1 package that year.

Year	Engine displacement, type, carburetor, VIN code	Max horsepower at rpm	Max torque at rpm
1971	302 cu in (4.9 L) Windsor V8, 2-barrel Autolite 2100, F-Code	210 bhp (157 kW; 213 PS) @ 4,600	296 lb⋅ft (401 N⋅m) @ 2,600
1971	351 cu in (5.8 L) Cleveland V8, 2-barrel Autolite 2100, H-Code	240 bhp (179 kW; 243 PS) @ 5,400	350 lb⋅ft (475 N⋅m) @ 3,400
1971	351 cu in (5.8 L) Cleveland V8, 4-barrel Autolite 4300A, M-Code (w/o Ram Air)	285 bhp (213 kW; 289 PS) @ 5,400	370 lb⋅ft (502 N⋅m) @ 3,400
1971	351 cu in (5.8 L) Cleveland CJ V8, 4-barrel Autolite 4300A, Q-Code (w/Ram Air) – late-1971 only, produced concurrently with the M-code	285 bhp (213 kW; 289 PS) @ 5,400	370 lb⋅ft (502 N⋅m) @ 3,400
1971	429 cu in (7.0 L) Cobra Jet V8, 4-barrel Rochester Quadrajet, C-Code	370 bhp (276 kW; 375 PS) @ 5,200	450 lb⋅ft (610 N⋅m) @ 3,400
1971	429 cu in (7.0 L) Super Cobra Jet V8, 4-barrel Holley 4150 (780 CFM), J-Code (Ram Air)	375 bhp (280 kW; 380 PS) @ 5,200	450 lb⋅ft (610 N⋅m) @ 3,400
1972	302 cu in (4.9 L) Windsor V8, 2-barrel Autolite 2100, F-Code	140 bhp (104 kW; 142 PS) @ 4,000	239 lb⋅ft (324 N⋅m) @ 2,000
1972	351 cu in (5.8 L) Cleveland V8, 2-barrel Autolite 2100, H-Code	177 bhp (132 kW; 179 PS) @ 4,000	284 lb⋅ft (385 N⋅m) @ 2,000
1972	351 cu in (5.8 L) Cleveland CJ V8, 4-barrel Autolite 4300D, Q-Code	266 bhp (198 kW; 270 PS) @ 5,400	301 lb⋅ft (408 N⋅m) @ 3,600
1972	351 cu in (5.8 L) Cleveland H.O. V8, 4-barrel Autolite 4300D, R-Code	275 bhp (205 kW; 279 PS) @ 6,000	286 lb⋅ft (388 N⋅m) @ 3,800
1973	302 cu in (4.9 L) Windsor V8, 2-barrel Autolite 2100, F-Code	140 bhp (104 kW; 142 PS) @ 4,000	239 lb⋅ft (324 N⋅m) @ 2,000
1973	351 cu in (5.8 L) Cleveland V8, 2-barrel Autolite 2100, H-Code	177 bhp (132 kW; 179 PS) @ 4,000	284 lb⋅ft (385 N⋅m) @ 2,000
1973	351 cu in (5.8 L) Cleveland CJ V8, 4-barrel Autolite 4300D, Q-Code	266 bhp (198 kW; 270 PS) @ 5,400	301 lb⋅ft (408 N⋅m) @ 3,600

== Second generation (1974–1978) ==
Second generation
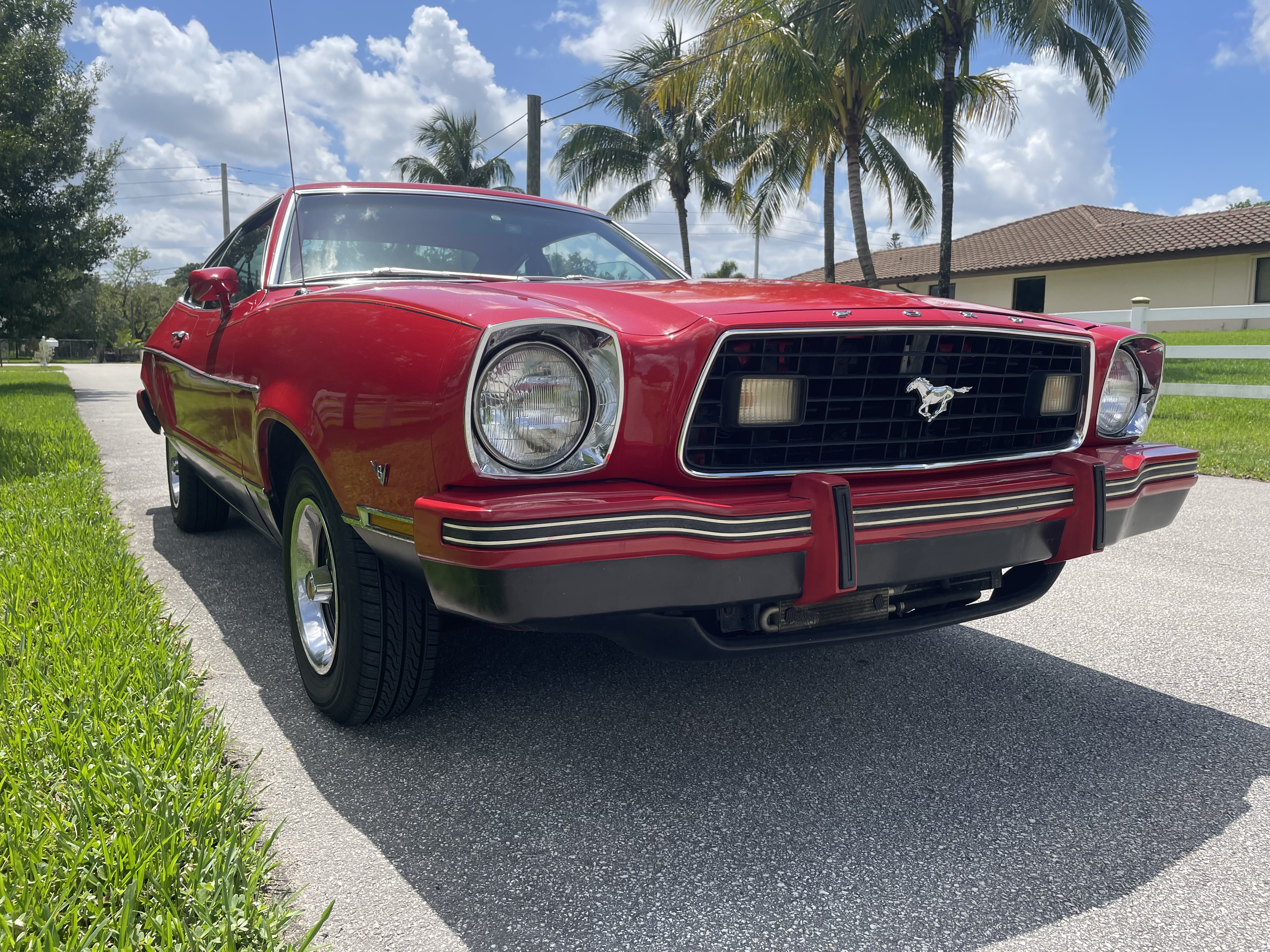

Overview
- Production: 1974–1978

Body and chassis
- Body style: 2-door coupe

Powertrain
- Engine: 170 cu in (2.8 L) Cologne V6; 302 cu in (4.9 L) Windsor V8
- Transmission: 4-speed manual

The Mach 1 name continued with the introduction of the Mustang II in 1974. The downsized vehicle – fitted with a 105 hp (78 kW) 2.8 L V6 as a base engine – outsold the Mach 1 models of the previous four years.

A substantially detuned 302 Windsor began as an option in 1975, rated at 140 hp (104 kW) and 240 lb⋅ft (325 N⋅m) of torque.

The Mach 1 remained mostly unchanged in 1976, as a new performance model – the Cobra II – was introduced alongside. 1977 proved to be the weakest sales year of the Mach 1 to date, selling only 6,719 units. The package remained for one more year, and was discontinued when the third generation Mustang was introduced for 1979, which continued the Cobra option through 1981.

== Fourth generation (2003–2004) ==
Ford Mustang Mach 1 (New Edge)
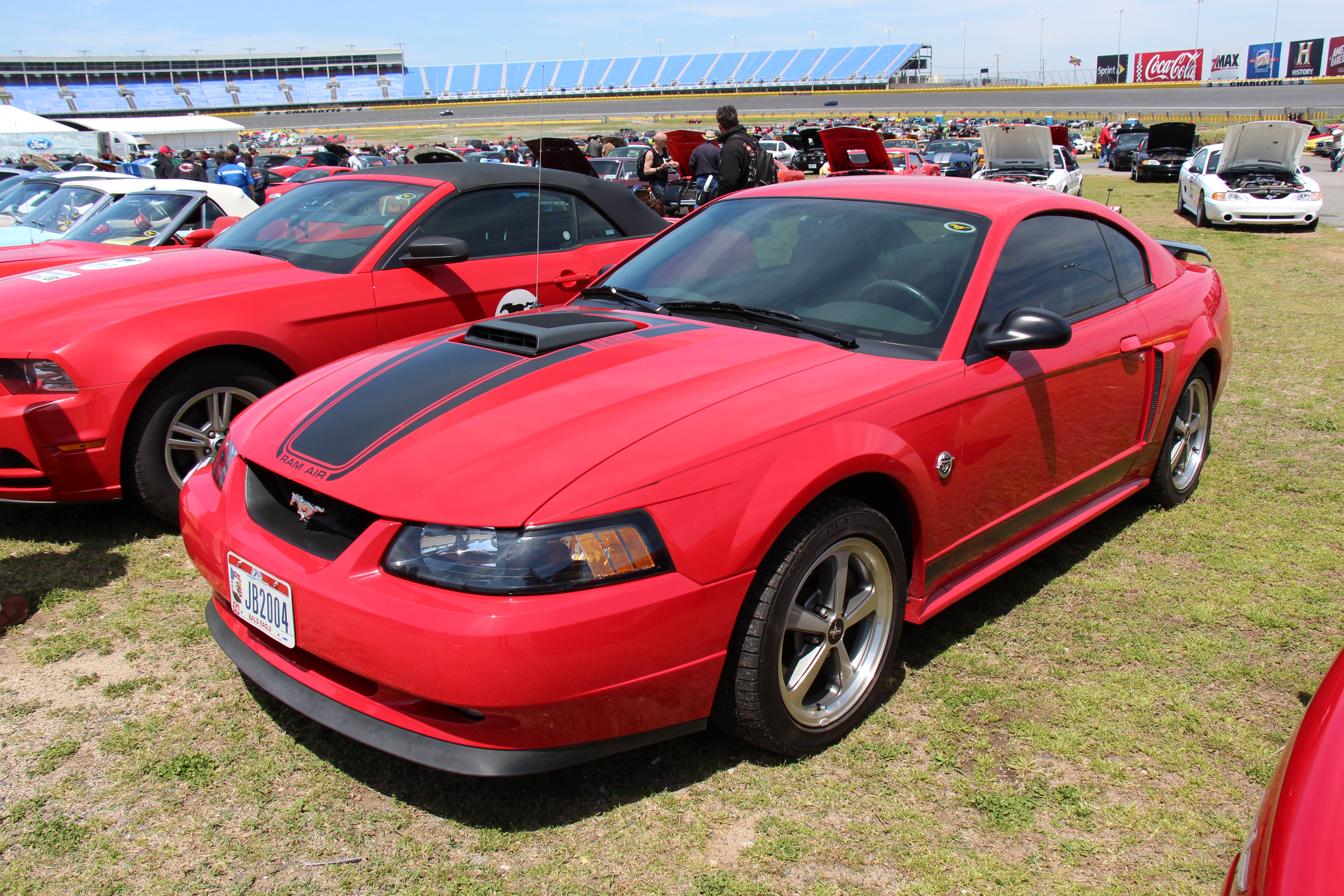
- 2004 Ford Mustang Mach 1

Overview
- Production: 2003–2004

Body and chassis
- Body style: 2-door coupe

Powertrain
- Engine: 281 cu in (4.6 L) DOHC Modular V8
- Transmission: 4-speed automatic; 5-speed manual

The third version of the Mach 1 was introduced in the fourth generation Mustang in 2003.

During the 1990s, the performance Mustang had been the SVT Cobra. Following the departure of the Fox chassis in 1993 and the arrival of the SN-95 in 1994, Ford also sought to eliminate the 302, a bored and stroked version of a V8 originally introduced in 1961, which would not occur until the 1996 model. Drawing on its newly developed OHC architecture engines known as the Modular, SVT created the 1996 and up Cobra around several variations of the 32 valve, all-aluminum 4.6 liter (281 CID) V8. The 32-valve 4.6 L V8 used in the Mustang Mach 1 was originally introduced in the 1993 Lincoln Mark VIII, however, for the Mach 1, it was re-engineered with a free-flowing exhaust and intake manifold to increase the engine by 30 horsepower. Below the SVT in performance was only the GT, reintroduced in 1982 with the 302 HO "5.0", later turning to the 16-valve SOHC V-8 in 1996. The sales of the new SN-95 style cars increased, so that by 2002, Mustang sales topped the combined sales figure of the Firebird and the Camaro. With GM's withdrawal from the "Pony Car wars" in 2002, Ford had a free hand at the whole market, but created what was arguably the fastest stock Mustang up to that point in time with the 2003–2004 SVT Cobra. However, concerns over a price gap between the GT and Cobra, as well as interest in keeping sales up before the release of the all-new 2005 S197 Mustang prompted the creation of two unique mid-range performance models: The 2001½ Bullitt GT and the 2003 and 2004 Mach 1 both credited to Team Mustang led by Art Hyde and Scott Hoag.

Following the stir caused by the retro 2001 "Bullitt" (a lightly modified 2001 GT, named for the famed chase Mustang driven by Steve McQueen in the film Bullitt) Ford saw the value of heritage in the Mustang name and as a follow-up, sought to revive the Mach 1 name. While similar to the Bullitt in the use of the Cobra's 13 in (330.2 mm) Brembo front brake rotors, unique Tokico gas shocks and struts, and lower and stiffer springs, the Mach 1 received a huge performance gain over the base GT and even the 265 hp (198 kW) Bullitt in the form of a unique variant of the DOHC 32-valve 4.6 L Modular V8. Commonly known by Mach 1 owners as an "R" code DOHC, (for the unique VIN engine R code) this all-aluminum engine features the same high flow heads as the 2003–2004 SVT Cobra, 2003–2004 Mercury Marauder, 2003–2005 Lincoln Aviator, and the 2003–2009 Australian Boss 5.4 L V8s (see Ford of Australia Boss 5.4 L), the engine also has intake camshafts sourced from Lincoln's 5.4 L "InTech" V8 to provide more mid-range torque. The Mach 1 engine had a 10.1:1 compression ratio in contrast to the 1999 and 2001 Cobra's 9.85:1, and the Mach 1 was equipped with a Windsor Aluminum Plant or WAP block unique from the Teksid aluminum blocks used in the 1996–1999 Cobras. The Mach 1 also featured a relatively high redline of 6,800 rpm (5-speed cars) and fuel cut off at 7,050 rpm or 5800 rpm (4-speed automatic). While on paper the 305 hp (228 kW) ratings seem a loss when compared to the 1999 and 2001 SVT Cobras which produced 320 hp (239 kW), in practice the Mach 1 engine produced similar peak horsepower and substantially more torque.

Further differences included the use of Ford's 8.8 in (223.5 mm) solid rear axle with a 3.55 final ratio (As opposed to SVT's Independent Rear Suspension) also the availability of a 4-speed automatic in addition to the Tremec sourced 5-speed manual. Factory steel "Box" cross-section subframe connectors were also added to increase chassis strength for both the added handling and to deal with the prodigious torque over the stock GT. Style-wise, the Mach 1 was distinct from other Mustangs as it drew heavily from the 1970 Mach 1. In addition to the matte black spoiler and hood stripe, flat black chin spoiler, Mach 1 rocker panel stripes, and Mach 1 badging on the rear, there were also faux Magnum 500 polished 17×8-inch alloy wheels. A retro-themed interior was included with well-bolstered dark grey leather seats featuring 1970s-style "Comfort Weave" textures, a 1970s-style gauge cluster, and a machined aluminum shift ball. An optional 18G interior upgrade package included stainless steel pedals, a 4-way head restraint, aluminum finished shift boot trim ring and door lock posts, and aluminum-look bezels on the dash. The most noticeable difference visually from other Mustangs was the bulging hood with cut-out and the return of a semi-legitimate "Shaker Hood". While physically identical in placement and function (the scoop is said to be built on the same tooling as the 1970 Mach 1) it only provides a portion of air to the engine routing to the airbox ahead of the MAF. It does function well as a cold air "snorkel" and a partial Ram Air at speed.

The 2004 model year included minor cosmetic changes to the Mach 1. They can be identified by bare aluminum finished valve covers, as opposed to the 2003's black finished covers. Outside, the Mach 1 came with 40th-anniversary tags ahead of the doors while the 2003 has the traditional Mustang Running Pony and tri-color bar. The only interior change was the deletion of the overhead "cargo net" mounted on the headliner. The horsepower and torque ratings remained the same as before: 305 hp (227 kW) and 320 lb⋅ft (434 N⋅m).

The 2003 models were available in Black, Dark Shadow Grey Metallic, Torch Red, Zinc Yellow, and Oxford White, with Azure Blue exclusive to the Mach 1. For 2004 Zinc Yellow was replaced with a more vibrant yellow called Screaming Yellow, as well as adding a new color, Competition Orange.

With improvements in power and a relatively light curb weight of 3,380 lb (1,533 kg), the 2003 Mustang Mach 1 posted magazine test numbers that were impressive given its $29,305 price tag. Magazine tests by Motor Trend found numbers from 13.88 seconds at 101.9 mph (164.0 km/h) for the automatic-equipped 2003 Mach 1 with a 5.6 seconds 0–60 mph, up to the five speed's 13.5 seconds at 105 mph (169 km/h) with a 5.2 second 0–60 mph (97 km/h) time. All this while maintaining a decent 63.5 mph (102.2 km/h) on a 600-foot (180 m) slalom and 0.85 g's on the skidpad, though the higher CG of the larger DOHC engine has created a tendency to understeer more than the IRS equipped SVTs and lower CG and lower curb weight Bullitt GTs with the same basic suspension and brakes.

Limited in production, the 2003 and 2004 Mach 1s ended with the New Edge body platform, the discontinuation of the Fox framed unibody, and the introduction of the first new frame design since 1979 the s-197 with 9,652 2003's and 7,182 2004's being built, contrary to the Mach 1 originally being advertised as a one-year limited run model with production set at 6,500 cars.

== Sixth generation (2021–2023) ==
Sixth generation Ford Mustang Mach 1
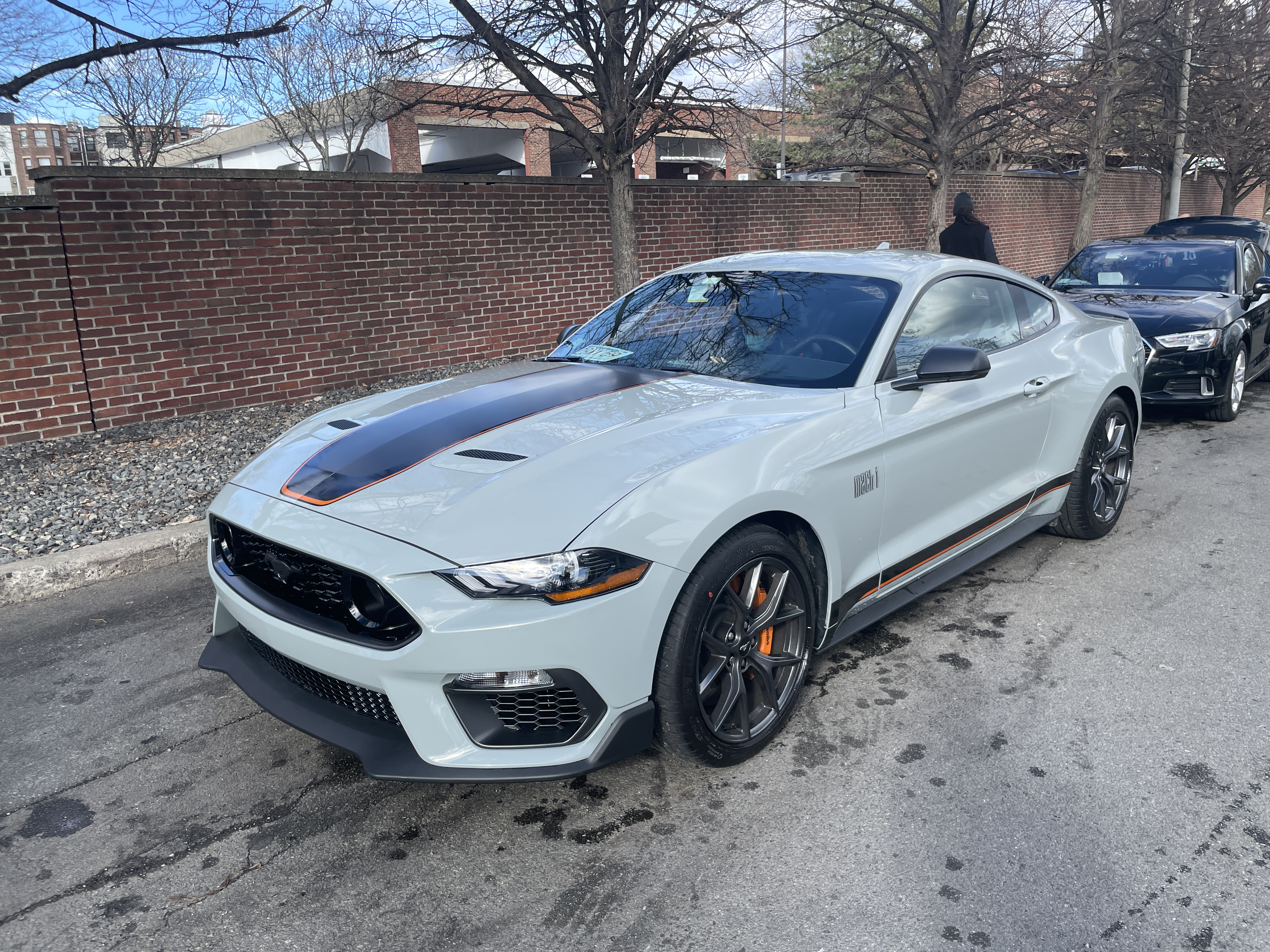
- 2022 Ford Mustang Mach 1

Overview
- Production: 2021–2023

Body and chassis
- Body style: 2-door coupe

Powertrain
- Engine: 307 cu in (5.0 L) Coyote V8
- Transmission: 10-speed automatic; 6-speed manual

After a 17-year hiatus, the fifth installment of the Mach 1 was introduced in the sixth generation Mustang. It uses the GT's 5.0 L Coyote V-8 producing 480 hp (358 kW) at 7,000 rpm and 420 lb⋅ft (569 N⋅m) at 4,600 rpm, which is same output of the Mustang Bullitt. The 2022 model produces 470 hp and 410 lb-ft at 4,600 rpm, which is a loss of 10 hp and 10 lb-ft of torque. It borrows several parts from the Shelby models: the intake manifold, oil-filter adapter, engine oil cooler, and front and rear subframe are shared with the Shelby GT350, while the rear axle cooling system, rear toe link, and rear diffuser are shared with the Shelby GT500. On the front grille, at each side of the pony badge, there are two large vent openings.

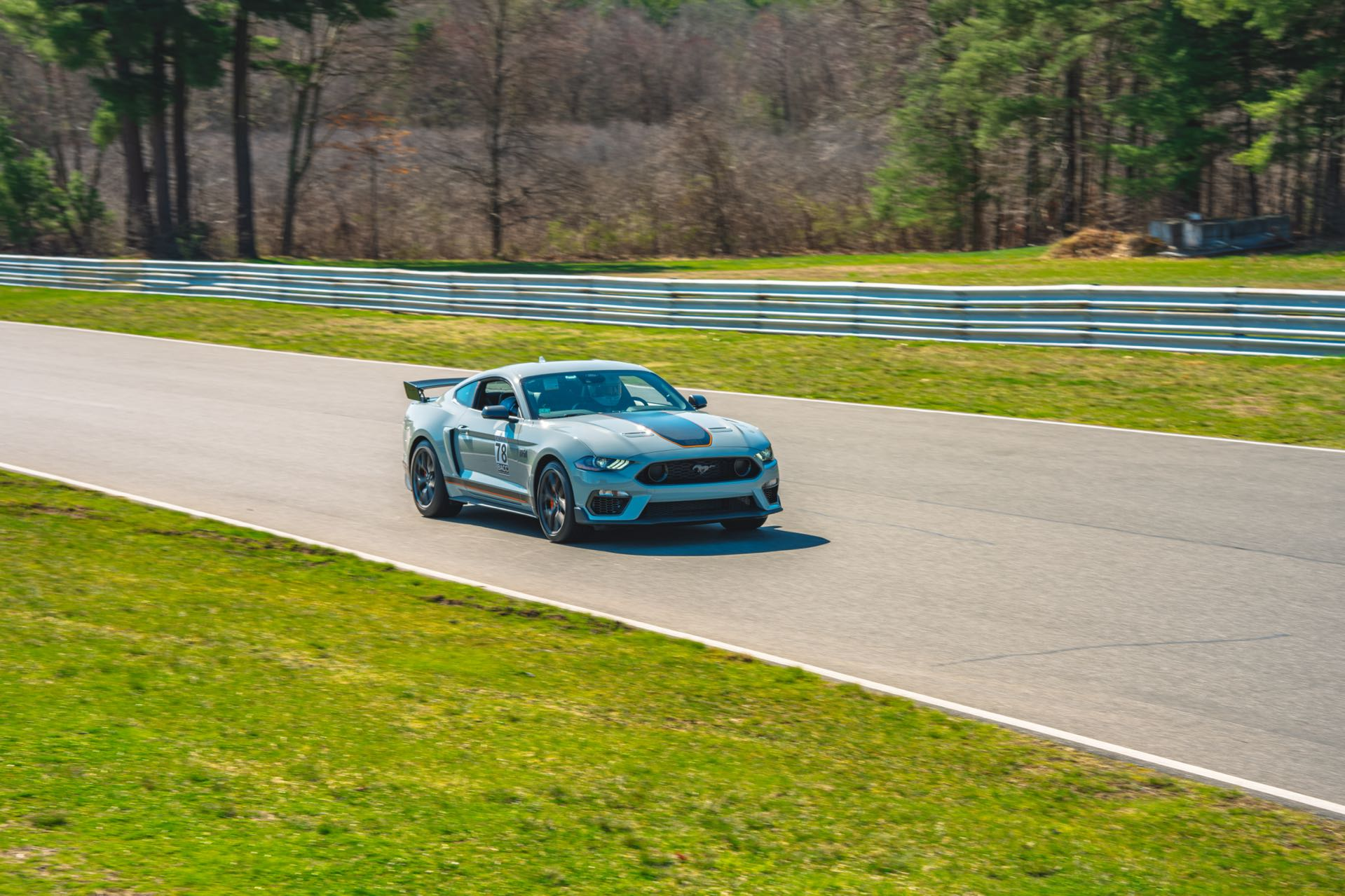
2022 Mach 1 on Track

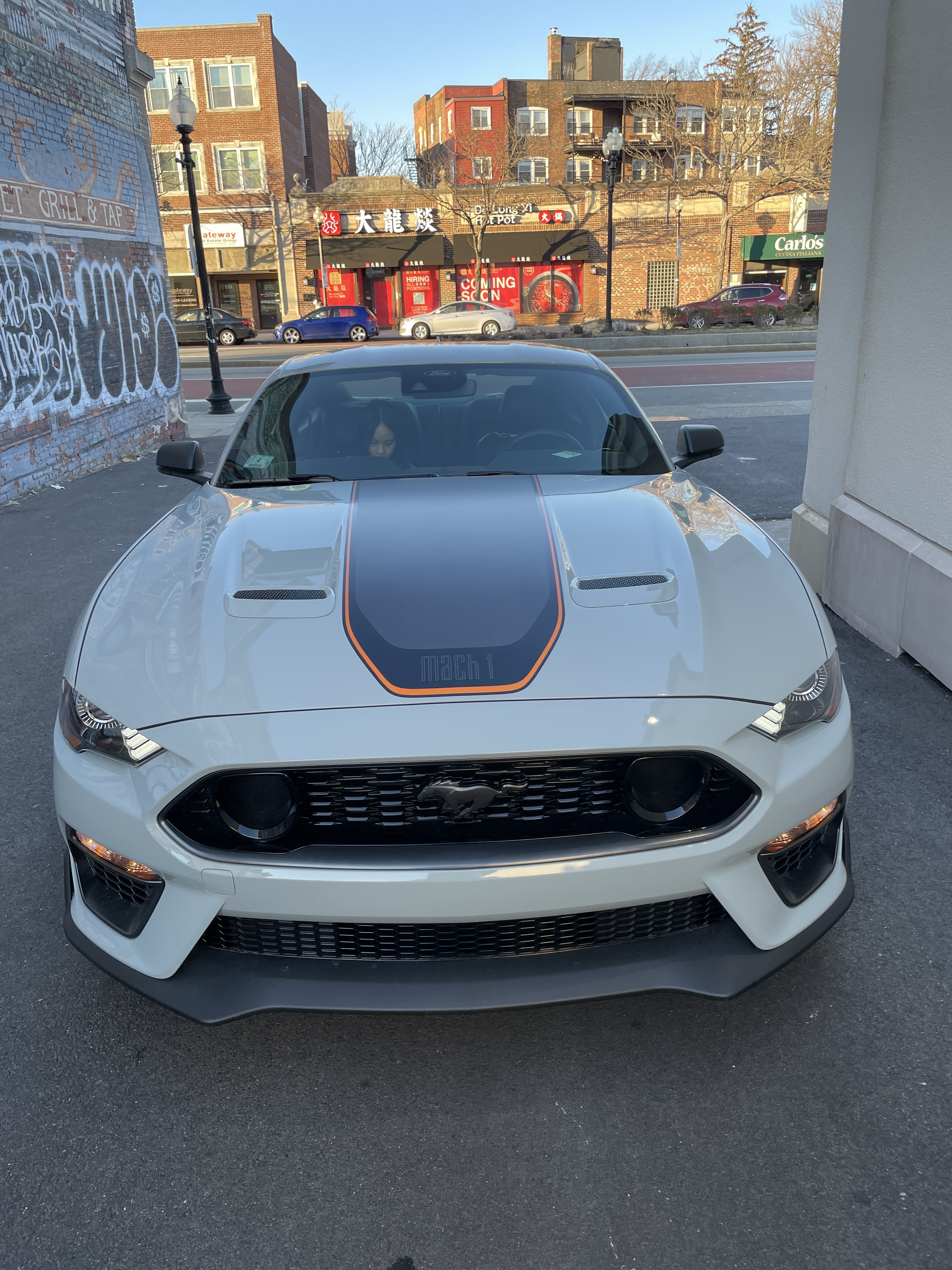
Front of the 2022 Mach 1

Ford's marketing department promoted Mach 1 performance and design that focused on the model's heritage.

Comparison of Mach 1 and GT in 2021 and 2022
	GT (2021)	GT (2022)	Mach 1 (2021)	Mach 1 (2022)
Starting MSRP	$40,120	$38,470	$52,720	$55,195
Base engine	5.0-liter V8 Coyote	5.0-liter V8 Coyote	5.0-liter V8 Coyote	5.0-liter V8 Coyote
Engine output	460 horsepower	450 horsepower	480 horsepower	470 horsepower
Torque at 4,600 rpm	420 lb-ft	410 lb-ft	420 lb-ft	410 lb-ft
Top speed	155 mph	155 mph	166 mph	166 mph
