= Carter Carburetor =

Former American carburetor manufacturer

Coordinates: 38°39′23.45″N 90°13′19.15″W

Carter Carburetor Company
- Founded: 1909; 117 years ago in St. Louis, Missouri
- Founder: William Carter
- Defunct: 1985
- Parent: American Car and Foundry Company (from 1922)

The Carter Carburetor Company was an American manufacturer of carburetors, primarily for the automobile industry. It was established in St. Louis, Missouri, in 1909 and ceased operation in 1985. Founder William Carter started experimenting with automotive carburetors while running a successful bicycle shop. His first, a cast brass model, could meter and deliver fuel more accurately than many competing units. He sold Carter Carburetor Company 13 years after founding it to American Car and Foundry Company. Carl Breer wrote that, upon learning that the Ball family (owners of Ball & Ball) was planning to leave the carburetor business, he set them up with Carter, which continued to produce the Ball & Ball basic designs used by Chrysler.

== History ==
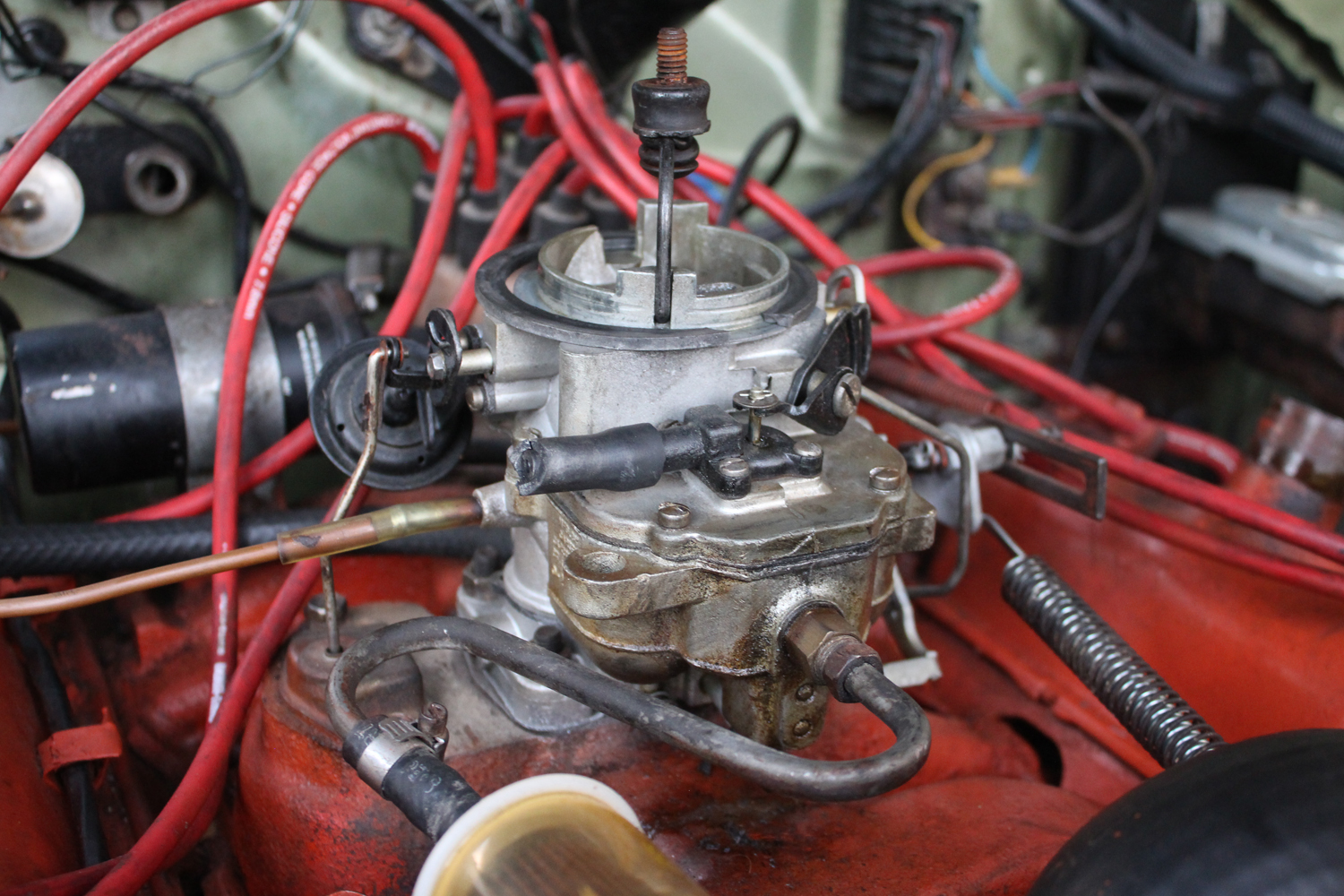
Carter BBD 2-barrel carburetor on a 1968 Plymouth with a Chrysler LA 318 motor

Carter adapted carburetors for Willys Jeep four-cylinder engines, waterproofing them for water crossings and making it possible to keep the engine going even on a steep incline (the YS carburetor). Carter also produced the first American four-barrel carburetor, used for Buick’s 1952 straight-eight, and followed by the William Carter Four-Barrel (WCFB) on the 1955 Chrysler C300. This was eventually superseded by the Aluminum Four-Barrel (AFB) and Air Valve Secondaries (AVS) models. The final Chrysler use of four-barrel Carter carburetors was the Thermo-Quad, which used a lightweight thermoplastic float bowl, on the most powerful Chrysler engines.

Carter produced Rochester Quadrajet carburetors for their rival maker whenever demand outpaced Rochester's ability to make them. They were identical to Rochester's units, except the Carter name was stamped into the body. In Carter's final years in the early 1980s, they also produced Weber carburetors under license, such as the three-barrel Type 40IDA sold as replacements (or fuel injection retrofits) for 1960s and 1970s Porsche 911 S.

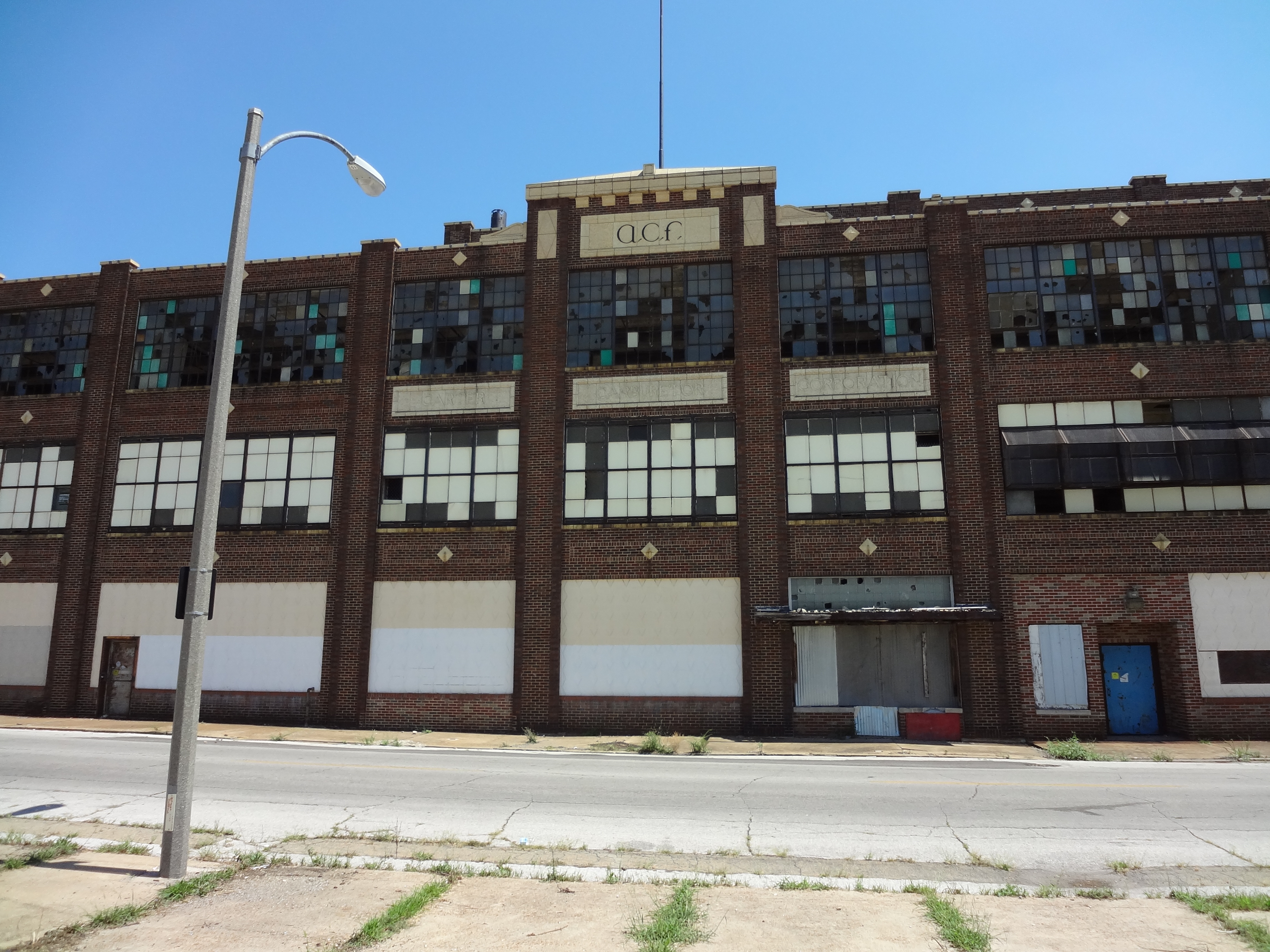
Carter Carburetor Corporation building in 2011

In 1984, with fuel injection having replaced carburetors on most cars, the plant closed. In 1985, American Car and Foundry shut down the entire Carter Carburetor foundry, a year later ceding the PCB-contaminated property to the City of St. Louis. The plant became an EPA Superfund site. The site contains contaminants including TCE and PCBs that penetrate the topsoil to bedrock. In 2013, cleanup was estimated to cost US$30 million.
