= Motorcraft 2150 carburetor =

Ford carburetor, manufactured 1973–1983

Motorcraft 2150 Carburetor

The Motorcraft 2150 is a Ford (also used by AMC) 2-barrel carburetor manufactured from 1973 through 1983, based heavily on its predecessor, the Autolite 2100 carburetor.

The 2150 improved on the 2100s design through the introduction of a variable air bleed system, which keeps the air to fuel mixture better balanced throughout the carburetor's full range of operation. The 2150 models from 1983 to 1986 were electronic feedback carburetors equipped with Ford's EEC-IV.

Motorcraft 2150 booster venturi with variable air bleed system

== Variations ==
Unlike the Autolite 2100, the Motorcraft 2150 was available only in three venturi sizes. They were available in manual and automatic transmission configurations.

=== 1.08 venturi, 287 CFM ===
These 2150s were used on Ford engines up to the 302 Windsor in cubic displacement.

Ford engines commonly equipped with the 1.08 venturi 2150:

- 1975–1986 2.8 L V6
- 1982–1983 3.8 L Essex V6
- 1973–1983 250 cu in (4.1 L) I6

Note: The 250-I6 is derived from the Falcon line (144-170-200). U.S. versions were only available with an integral cast head and intake making them only able to accept a one-barrel carb. Foreign versions were also made with typical two-piece intake and head.

- 1973–1983 302 cu in (4.9 L) Windsor 351W 5.8L light truck/van

The last Ford vehicles to leave the factory with 2150 carburetors were 1986 Aerostars equipped with the 2.8 L V6.

=== 1.21 venturi, 351 CFM and 1.23 venturi, 356 CFM ===
These larger 2150s were generally used in large Ford passenger cars and trucks equipped with 335-series engines. These were also used, with the addition of an altitude compensator, on Jeep Grand Wagoneers equipped with the AMC 360 V8.

Ford engines commonly equipped with the 1.21 venturi 2150:

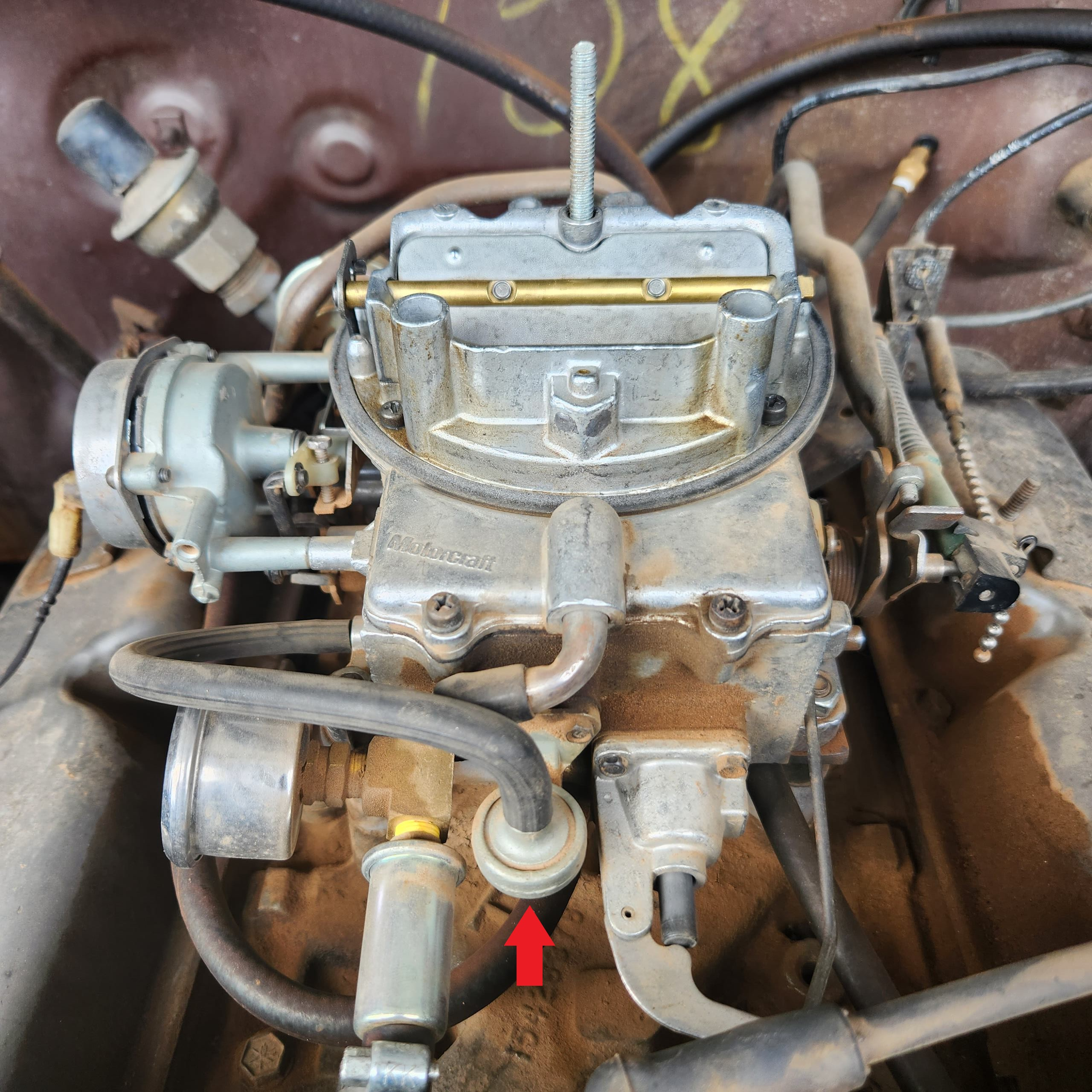
- Motorcraft 2150 with a temperature compensated pump (red arrow) in the front. These were used to comply with California emissions standards.
  1973-1982 351 cu in (5.8 L) Windsor
- 1977-1982 351 cu in (5.8 L) 351M
- 1977-1979 400 cu in (6.6 L)

AMC engine equipped with the 1.2 venturi 2150 with altitude compensator:

- 1981-1991 AMC 360 cu in (5.9 L) Gen 3 “Tall Deck”

== See also ==
- List of Ford engines
