= Autolite 4300 carburetor =

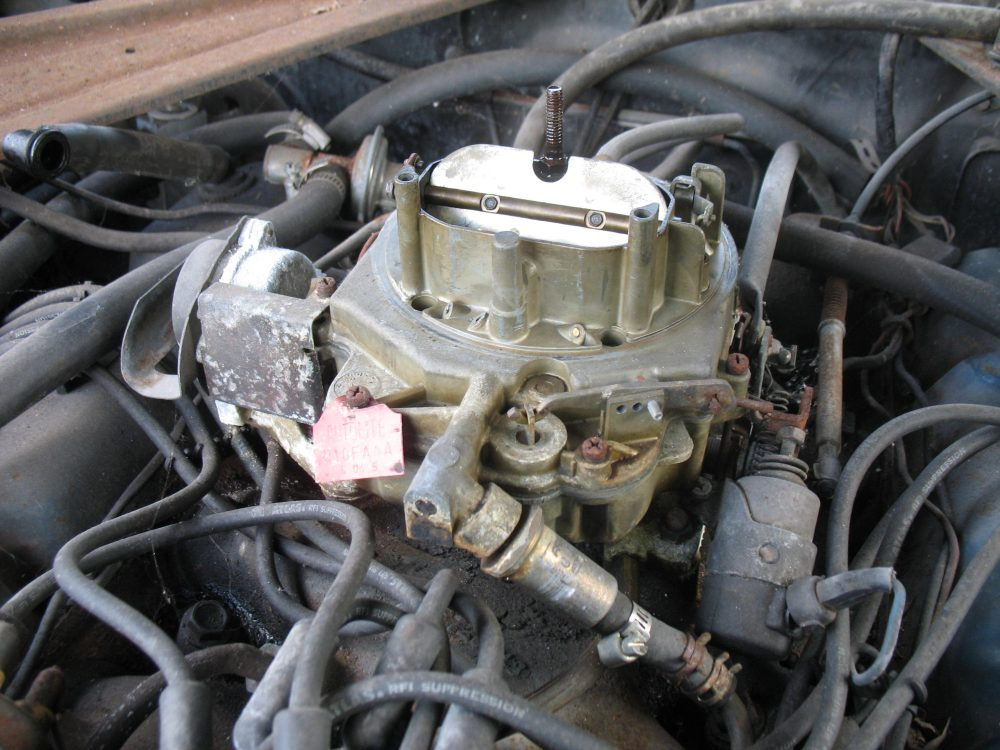
Autolite 4300A Carburetor

The Autolite 4300 was a four-barrel (four venturi) carburetor manufactured by Autolite in multiple variants from 1967 through 1974. Used by both Ford and AMC, it was produced as an emissions-compliant replacement for the previous Autolite 4100 model, and was superseded by the Motorcraft 4350.

Both the 4300A and 4300D have unique spread bore throttle plate designs (the 4300A being much less pronounced than the 4300D), which must mate to a correspondingly configured intake manifold.

== Variations ==
=== 4300A, 441 CFM (1967-1969) ===
The 4300A, a four-barrel 441 CFM carburetor, was released in 1967, replacing the 4100 on all Fords excluding the police package 428 CID and 289 CID high-output engines.

4300A 441 CFM specs:

- 1" primary venturi
- Primary throttle bore: 1-7/16"
- Secondary throttle bore: 1-9/16"

The 4300A was found to run too lean for the 390 CID engines, resulting in the development of the 600 CFM 4300A in 1968. The 441 CFM 4300A was discontinued after the 1969 model year in favor of the two-barrel Autolite 2100 carburetor.

=== 4300A, 600 CFM (1968-1974) ===
A 600 CFM version of the 4300A with a 0.25" larger primary venturi and 0.20" larger primary and secondary throttle bores, was released in 1968. By 1970, it was factory supplied on most Fords equipped with the 429 and 460, in addition to vehicles with the 351 Cleveland.

4300A 600 CFM specs:

- 1.25" primary venturi
- Primary throttle bore: 1-9/16"
- Secondary throttle bore: 1-11/16"

=== 4300D, 715 CFM spreadbore (1971-1974) ===
In 1971, the 715 CFM 4300D was introduced, featuring a much more pronounced spreadbore design with the same primary venturi and primary throttle bore as the 600 CFM 4300A but a much larger 2" secondary throttle bore. Produced through 1974, it is incompatible with other spreadbore intake designs.

4300D 715 CFM specs:

- 1.25" primary venturi
- Primary throttle bore: 1-9/16"
- Secondary throttle bore: 2"

== Motorcraft 4350 ==
The 4300D was replaced by the Motorcraft 4350 carburetor in 1975.

== Criticism and improvements ==
Both variants of the 4300 have been criticized for poor acceleration, rough operation, and a potential for fire due to a poor fuel inlet design. This negative reputation is not universally accepted amongst users of these carburetors.

== See also ==
- Ford 335 engine
- Ford 385 engine
- List of Ford engines
- Rochester Quadrajet, a four barrel carburetor with a "spread bore" throttle plate
