= Quadrajet =

Carburetor

The Quadrajet is a four barrel carburetor with a "spread bore" throttle plate, made by the Rochester Products Division of General Motors. Its first application was the new-for-1965 Chevy 396ci engine. Its last application was on the 1990 Oldsmobile 307 V8 engine, which was last used in the Cadillac Brougham and full size station wagons made by Chevrolet, Pontiac, Oldsmobile, and Buick.

== Design ==
The Quadrajet is a "spread bore" carburetor; the secondary venturis are much larger than the primary venturis. By comparison, a "square bore" carburetor has primary and secondary venturis of similar size. Most Quadrajets were capable of 750 ft^{3} (21,000 L)/min (cfm) maximum, but some rare Buick and Pontiac models were capable of 800 ft^{3} (23,000 L)/min for use on high performance engines, and most 1984-1987 pickup trucks were also equipped with the 800-cfm carb. Most Quadrajets use a vacuum operated piston to move the primary metering rods to control the air-fuel ratio, allowing the mixture to be lean under low load conditions and rich during high load conditions. A less-common version uses a linkage driven off the primary throttle shaft to mechanically move the power piston. "E" (electronic control module controlled) series of Quadrajets use a computer controlled mixture control solenoid that responds to electronic signals from the throttle position and oxygen sensors via the computer, ideal for precise fuel metering and allowing additional fuel under load. The solenoid-controlled metering rods allow the fuel mixture to be very close to optimum, then the solenoid is pulse width modulated at about 6 Hz to fine-tune the air fuel ratio under closed loop conditions. The electronic versions have a throttle position sensor that is mounted inside the carburetor body, actuated by the accelerator pump lever.

Quadrajet carburetors have mechanical secondary throttle plates operated by a progressive linkage; the primaries open before the secondaries, and use on-demand air valve plates above the secondary throttle plates. The air valves are connected by a cam and linkage to the secondary fuel metering rods. As the airflow increases through the secondary bores, the air valves are pushed down, rotating a cam that lifts the secondary metering rods. The secondary rods are tapered in a similar fashion to the primary metering rods, effectively increasing the size of the fuel metering holes as the rods are lifted and delivering more fuel. Therefore, the position of the air valve will control both fuel and air flow through the secondary venturis, even if the secondary throttle plates are fully opened. Thus, the Quadrajet acts like a vacuum-secondary carburetor and only delivers more fuel as it is needed.

== Advantages ==
Significant positive features of the Quadrajet were:

1. Economy. Unlike most other four-barrel carburetors, the Quadrajet has a drastically different sized primary and secondary bores. The much smaller primaries act as a small two-barrel carburetor until the accelerator is pressed far enough to start to open the secondaries. The small primaries allow the primary throttle plates to be opened wider, and thus making the carburetor more efficient than a large two barrel, or square bore four-barrel.
2. Drivability. The small primaries also create better throttle response at partial throttle application. The Quadrajet has a centrally located float that gives it excellent fuel control from the triple venturi boosters.
3. Off Road. The Quadrajet's centrally located float is highly resistant to level changes caused by cornering or acceleration.

The Quadrajet carburetor was actually a derivative of a variable venturi carburetor called the DOVE (diaphragm operated variable entrance) which was developed in the 1961-63 timeframe at Rochester Products. Testing at the GM test facility in Arizona uncovered a hot engine percolation problem which resulted in hot start difficulties because of flooded engines. Production of the DOVE, which was underway in 1963 when the hot start problem was identified, was suspended and a crash project was initiated to fix the problem. Simultaneously a second crash project was initiated to develop a modified DOVE which became the Quadrajet. Prototype Quadrajet carburetors were in testing at Rochester Products by the Fall of 1963. The DOVE hot-start problem was corrected but not in a timely enough manner; the production DOVEs were destroyed and the Quadrajet took its place.

== Variants ==
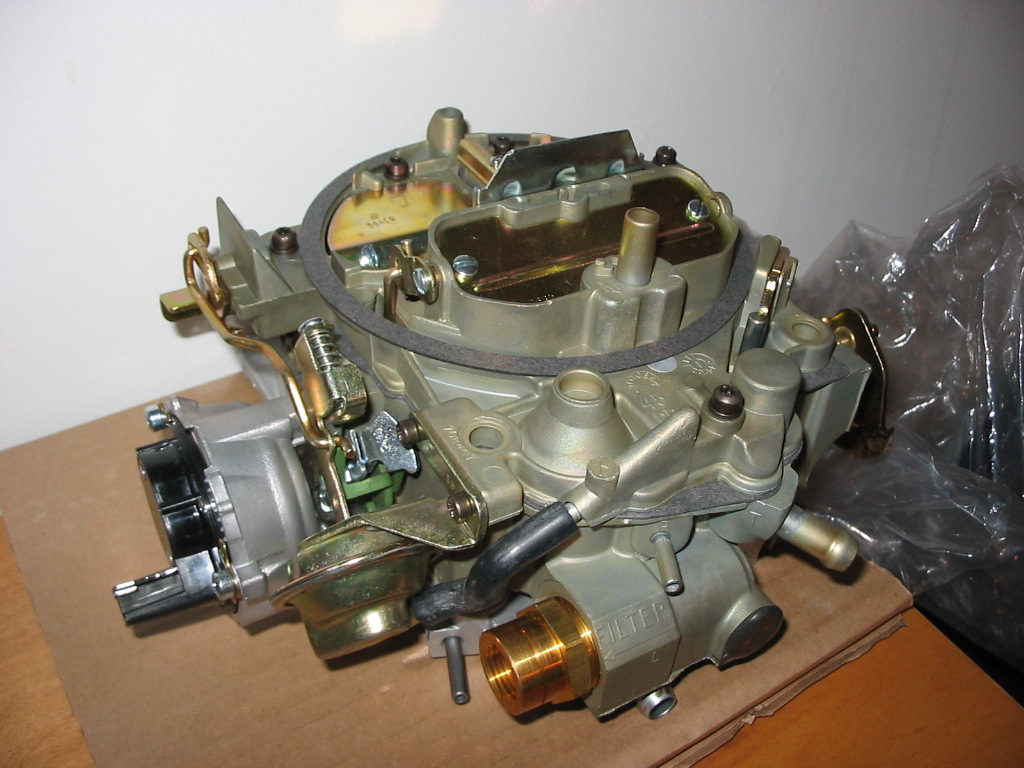
A Quadrajet M4ME carburetor with electric choke

A major change to the Quadrajet was implemented for the 1975 model year. These newer carburetors are considered "Modified Quadrajets" or "Mod Quads". In addition to the casting revisions that result in a physically larger carburetor, the primary metering rod length is different from '74 and older Q-Jets. They were also equipped with a self-contained choke mechanism that no longer relied on an intake manifold mounted choke, and a number "1" was added to the beginning of their identification numbers. The digits in a Quadrajet model type denote its features. For example, the "E" at the end of a later Q-jet model denoted that it had an electric choke, the "C" denoted a hot air coil style choke element. Original Delco service kits were once sold through both GM dealers and Delco distributors and were called "Power Kits". These have long been discontinued, although there are several aftermarket sources that still supply parts for these carburetors.

=== Choke variants ===
The choke provision for the Quadrajet was initially in the form of an intake-mounted, heat sensitive spring, (divorced choke), often referred to as a heat riser. The spring connected to a rod that actuated the choke mechanism on the passenger's side of the carburetor, and relied on intake manifold's temperature. Later models, second generation Quadrajets, (1974-onward), were designed with a self-contained choke housing that held the heat sensitive spring and directly operated the choke mechanism. This system relied on hot air drawn from a small heat exchanger in the intake manifold—and later models, (generally 1978-onward), relied on the vehicle's 12 volt system to power a heating element and spring as the engine's temperature increased.

Quadrajet carburetors were also built under contract by Carter. This was due to the fact that Rochester could not keep up with the demand for carburetors at various points in their production. Carter-built Quadrajets will have the name "Carter" cast into them, but are functionally identical to the Rochester-built equivalent. The "newest" Q-Jets were built for, and sold by Edelbrock. There were several versions made, for both stock replacement and "performance" applications. One version was specifically intended as a replacement for Carter ThermoQuad carburetors. The Edelbrock Q-jets have been discontinued, although at this time Edelbrock still supplies some replacement parts.

== See also ==
- Autolite 4300 carburetor, a four barrel carburetor with a "spread bore" throttle plate
