= Rochester Products Division =

Former division of General Motors

- Industry: Automotive
- Genre: Automobile parts production
- Founded: 1939
- Defunct: 1995
- Headquarters: 1000 Lexington Avenue, Rochester, New York, United States
- Area served: Worldwide
- Products: Automotive parts
- Owner: General Motors
- Parent: Delphi Corporation; Formerly General Motors
- Divisions: AC Rochester
- Website: https://www.gm.com/company/facilities/rochester-operations

Rochester Products Division (RPD) was a division of General Motors that manufactured carburetors, and related components including emissions control devices and cruise control systems in Rochester, New York. In 1995 Rochester became part of Delphi, which in turn became a separate company four years later, and continues to manufacture fuel injection systems in Rochester, now part of General Motors Automotive Components Holdings- Rochester Operations.

== History ==
The company began as the Rochester Coil Company founded by Edward A. Halbleib in 1908, becoming the North East Electric Company the following year. In 1916 the company was located at 348 Whitney Street, Rochester.

In 1929 Alfred P. Sloan announced the acquisition of the company on behalf of General Motors. "For some years this Company has been an outstanding manufacturer of starters, ignition systems and other electrical equipment." "It was consolidated with GM's former Delco-Light Company in 1930 and later renamed Delco Appliance Division." In 1937 Rochester Products was founded, planned as a second plant for Delco Appliance, but achieving Division status by 1939. In 1953 an advertisement in Life stated: "Rochester builds original equipment carburetors for Chevrolet starting with 1950, Oldsmobile from 1949 and Cadillac from 1951. Also, Rochester supplies replacement carburetors for Chevrolets from 1932." Rochester also supplied Pontiac, while using the Power Jet name in the replacement market.

In 1952 the Oregonian reported: "Automobile cigarette lighters produced by the Rochester Automotive products division of General Motors are tested to reach a temperature of 1400 degrees in no less than 10 and no more than 12 seconds."

The 2G (later 2GC and 2GV) carburetor, commonly called the 2 Jet, was introduced in 1955, and continued to be used on GM V8s until at least 1969. In all, it was used in at least 125 applications, including the Brockway's inline six. In 1957 Chevrolet introduced their first fuel-injected engine, the Rochester Ramjet high-performance option on Corvette and passenger cars at $484. In 1956 Oldsmobile were also experimenting with Rochester fuel injection, at the GM desert proving grounds near Phoenix, but offered the Rochester triple-carburetor J2 option for 1957.

The company is known for the Quadrajet carburetor (among others), which was originally designed in the 1960s and remained in production, with modifications to meet progressively tightening exhaust emission limits, into the 1980s. The Quadrajet became computer controlled in 1980 in California and in 1981 in the rest of the states; its last application was on the 1990 Cadillac Brougham and 1990 full size GM station wagons with the Olds 307 engine. RPD was a pioneer in fuel injection systems in road cars in the 1980s. In addition to carburetors, Rochester also made various emissions control equipment such as charcoal canisters and EGR valves, which found use in GM vehicles as well as those from other makes. Other products made at this plant were locks and keys as well as steel tubing for both vehicular and non-vehicular applications. The last major carburetor design by Rochester was the Varajet II, essentially a Quadrajet halved lengthwise, and was one of the few successful progressive 2-barrel carburetors. It was installed on 4- and 6-cylinder engines from 1979 to 1986.

In 1981, Rochester Products and Diesel Equipment Division merged in what was publicly described as a cost-cutting move. At this time RPD had about 7,000 employees, and DED had about 3,300 employees. DED had plants in Grand Rapids, Michigan. The headquarters remained in Rochester.

In 1988, the diesel fuel injection business was sold to Penske Transportation, and Rochester Products and AC Spark Plug merged.

Between the end of 1991 and the beginning of 1992, Rochester Products, at the request of General Motors do Brasil, launched on the Brazilian market the first electronic fuel injection in the world programmed and developed for ethanol in the Chevrolet Monza, Chevrolet Kadett and Chevrolet Ipanema, known in Europe such as Opel Ascona, Opel Kadett and Opel Kadett Caravan respectively. The system model was the Rochester Multec-700 with a single fuel injector (singlepoint).

In 1994, the Grand Rapids operations of AC Rochester were spun off.

== See also ==
- Delco Electronics
- Detroit Diesel
- Harrison Radiator Corporation
- Holley Performance Products, a competitor
- Remy International, Inc. (formerly Delco Remy)
