= Ford 335 engine =

Ford 335 V8
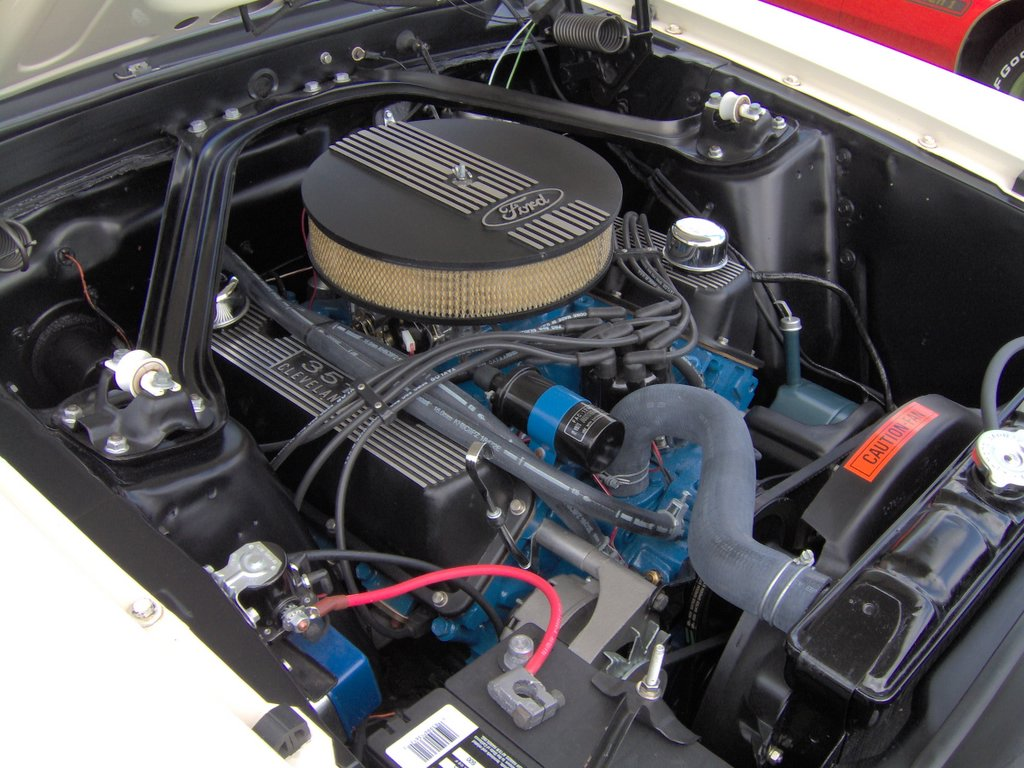

Overview
- Manufacturer: Ford Motor Company
- Also called: Ford Cleveland V8
- Production: 1969–1982

Layout
- Configuration: 90° OHV small-block V8; 4.380" bore spacing
- Displacement: 301.6 cu in (4.9 L); 351.9 cu in (5.8 L); 402.1 cu in (6.6 L)
- Cylinder bore: 4.0 in (102 mm)
- Piston stroke: 3.0 in (76 mm); 3.5 in (89 mm); 4.0 in (102 mm)
- Cylinder block material: Cast iron; Deck height: 9.206" (302C, 351C); 10.297" (351M, 400)
- Cylinder head material: Cast iron
- Valvetrain: Overhead valve; Cast iron cam, flat tappet

Chronology
- Predecessor: Ford FE V8; Ford small block V8
- Successor: Ford small block V8

The Ford 335 engine was a family of engines built by the Ford Motor Company between 1969 and 1982. The "335" designation reflected Ford management's decision during its development to produce a 335 cu in (5.5 L) engine with room for expansion. This engine family began production in late 1969 with a 351 cu in (5.8 L) engine, commonly called the 351C. It later expanded to include a 400 cu in (6.6 L) engine which used a taller version of the engine block, commonly referred to as a tall deck engine block, a 351 cu in (5.8 L) tall deck variant, called the 351M, and a 302 cu in (4.9 L) engine which was exclusive to Australia.

The 351C, introduced in 1969 for the 1970 model year, is commonly referred to as the 351 Cleveland after the Brook Park, Ohio, Cleveland Engine plant in which most of these engines were manufactured. This plant complex included a gray iron foundry (Cleveland Casting Plant), and two engine assembly plants (Engine plant 1 & 2). As newer automobile engines began incorporating aluminum blocks, Ford closed the casting plant in May 2012.

The 335 series engines were used in mid- and full-sized cars and light trucks, (351M/400 only) at times concurrently with the Ford small block family 351 Windsor, in cars. These engines were also used as a replacement for the FE V8 family (1958–1978) in both the car and truck lines. The 335 series only outlived the FE series by a half-decade, being replaced by the more compact small block V8 family.

== Overview ==
The 335-series V8s were overhead valve V8 engines that used a unique short-skirt engine block that was both longer and heavier than that of the existing Ford small block V8. The 335 series incorporated features used on the 385 big-block series, including the canted valve layout, the valve train design, and thin-wall casting technology. All 335 series V8s had free breathing, large-port canted valve heads with a rugged engine block. These engines use a shallow poly angle combustion chamber rather than the wedge style used on the small blocks. The 335 engines use large main-bearing caps, with two-bolt as standard and four-bolt added on some performance versions.

The first engine in the 335 series was introduced in late 1969 as the 351C. The 400 cu in appeared in the third quarter of 1970, which raised deck height from 9.206 in (234 mm) and tall deck 10.297 in (262 mm) to accommodate a longer stroke, and used larger main bearings for additional strength. This was similar to the changes made to convert a 302 Small Block to the 351 Windsor.

For the 1975 model year the 351M replaced the 351C in North American markets. Initially Ford of Australia imported US made 351C engines. However, by November 1971, Ford of Australia began to manufacture the 351C locally at the Geelong Foundry. This engine was very similar to the American counterpart and remained in production until December 1981. Ford of Australia also produced a smaller 302C alongside the 351C, which was exclusive to the Australian market.

=== Comparison to Ford Small Block V8 ===
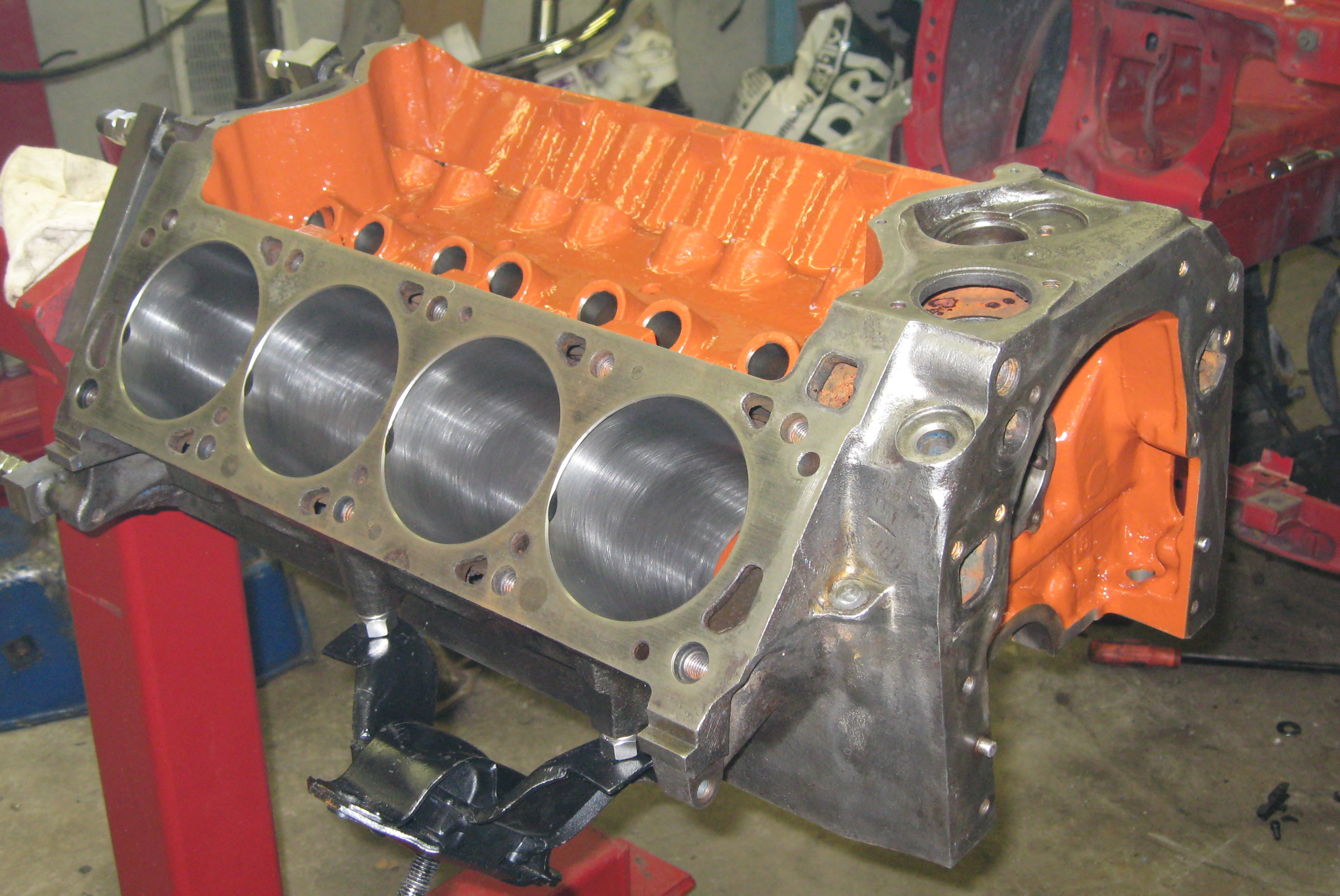
Cleveland block

302 Block

All 335 series engines shared the same 4.38 in (111 mm) bore spacing and cylinder head bolt pattern as the Small Block V8 family. There are a number of significant differences between the two engine families. The 335 series have a roughly two-inch extension cast into the front of the block which forms an integrated timing cover enclosure covered by a piece of flat steel, similar to an Oldsmobile V8 engine. This results in the 335 series engine block being heavier than the Small Block series engines'. The 335 series use a dry intake manifold with the radiator hose connecting vertically to the cylinder block above the cam timing chain cover. Small Blocks use a wet intake manifold which routes coolant through the intake manifold via a horizontally protruding hose. The 335 uses smaller, 14mm, spark plugs and has a square-shaped eight bolt rocker cover while the small block's six-bolt rocker cover is more rounded.

=== Oil system ===
To reduce production costs, Ford eliminated one of the 335 series's main oil galleries from the block casting, leaving two compared to the Small Block family's three. The result was an oil system very similar to the 385 series V8s, adequate for street engines but falling short in high-revolution race use without modification. The two main oil galleys in the 335 series engine run along the lifter bores. Oil is fed from the filter to the number one main bearing followed by the number one cam bearing above. At the same time, it also feeds the right hand oil galley, supplying the right side lifter bank. It has four galleries that lead to each of the remaining main bearings. After the oil feeds them, it feeds each corresponding camshaft bearing above. At the rear-most main bearing, the oil goes into the second gallery, which feeds the left lifter bank. In addition the oil system not prioritizing the main bearings, the 335 engines have excessive clearances in the lifter bores. This results in oil leaking out of the lifter bores which can cause oil cavitation from the lifter motion, and can reduce oil flow to the main bearings.

=== Cylinder heads ===
The cylinder-head design for the 335 series engines is its most definitive design feature. All cylinder head variants were two-valve that use large free flowing ports with poly-angle or 'canted' valves. Having the intake and exhaust valves at separate angles allowed for very large valves to be used while reducing the port length and minimizing sharp turns within it, creating freer flowing heads than the Ford small block V8s.

The 335-series engines used different cylinder heads for two and four barrel carburetors. The 2V (two carburetor venturi) small port cylinder heads were used on 2-barrel engines while the 4V (four venturi) large port cylinder heads were used on the 4-barrel engines. The ports and valves on 2V heads were significantly larger than small block engines and had excellent flow - actually slightly better than 4V heads at lower valve lifts. The 4V heads had enormous ports which flowed very well, in particular at higher valve lift, and could out-flow Chevrolet Double Hump heads and Chrysler's high-performance 340 heads.

In addition to the two port sizes, the 335 cylinder heads used two style of combustion chambers, an open or a closed "quench" chamber. Both combustion chambers are very shallow, due to the shallow valve angles. The combustion chambers are almost a very shallow hemispherical chamber, rather than a wedge shaped. The closed chamber heads enclose the valves more closely, reducing combustion chamber volume, to increase the compression ratio. However, both designs have the same thermal efficiency and resistance to detonation. The closed combustion chamber promotes better swirling of incoming air fuel mixture, giving it a low-rpm torque advantage, and requires less machining to obtain high compression ratios. However, the open chamber heads valves are less shrouded, which improves low lift airflow, and they exhibit better emissions characteristics.

Most 335 series engines used stamped rocker arms with cast fulcrums that made for a non-adjustable valve train. The rocker arm design was originally used by the Ford 385 series engines. However, the Boss 351 and 351 HO had an adjustable valve train, using rocker arms mounted on screw-in studs and guide plates.

Prior to the release of the 351C, the 335 Series cylinder head was used on the Ford Boss 302 engine. The Boss 302 used a large port closed chamber 4V cylinder head which required minor modifications to make the cylinder heads work with the 302 engine block. The Boss 302 version of the cylinder heads used small 58cc cambers and large 2.23" intake valves. The valves were later reduced to 2.19" as used on the 351C 4V cylinder heads.

335 Series V8 engine cylinder heads
Head type	Chamber type	Chamber volume	Intake valve	Exhaust valve	Intake port	Exhaust port	Application
2V	Open	74.7 - 79.9cc	2.04"	1.65"	2.02" x 1.65"	1.84"x1.38"	351C-2V, 351M, 400
4V	Closed	61.3 - 64.3cc	2.19"	1.71"	2.50" x 1.75"	2.00"x1.74"	1970 351C-4V
4V	Closed	64.6 - 67.6cc	2.19"	1.71"	2.50" x 1.75"	2.00"x1.74"	1971 351C-4V
Boss 351	Closed	64.6 - 67.6cc	2.19"	1.71"	2.50" x 1.75"	2.00"x1.74"	1971 Boss 351
351C-CJ	Open	73.9 - 76.9cc	2.19"	1.71"	2.50" x 1.75"	2.00"x1.74"	1971-72 351C-CJ
351C HO	Open	73.9 - 76.9cc	2.19"	1.71"	2.50" x 1.75"	2.00"x1.74"	1972 351C HO
351C-CJ	Open	73.9 - 76.9cc	2.04"	1.65"	2.50" x 1.75"	2.00"x1.74"	1973-74 351C-CJ
Australian 302C	Closed	56.4 - 59.4cc	2.04"	1.65"	2.02" x 1.65"	1.84"x1.38"	302C

== 351 Cleveland ==
=== History ===
The genesis of the "351 Cleveland" resulted from Ford's inability to produce enough of its new Ford small block engine-based 351 cu in V8s at its Windsor Engine Plant #1 in Windsor, Ontario, Canada. Sales and marketing forecasts for the 1969 model year called for a second line, which was organized at Ford's Cleveland, Ohio, engine works.

At this time, it was also decided to upgrade the design of the new Cleveland manufactured 351s to improve performance. Two cylinder-head designs were developed, one similar to the 351W, but with larger ports and valves, and the other with very large ports with canted intake and exhaust valves similar to the big-block Ford 385 series V8. Sales, marketing, and product planning favored the canted valve design, as it was viewed as more innovative.

Other changes to the engine were related to ease of manufacture and improved reliability. This led to elimination of coolant flowing through a 'dry' intake manifold, a potential source of leaks and minimized unnecessary heat transfer. To perform this change, the front of the engine block was extended to include provisions for the coolant to flow through a crossover in the block. This extension also acted as an integrated timing chain housing. The timing chain housing was covered with flat steel that was easier to seal than the typical large timing chain cover used on other Ford V8s. These changes resulted in a bigger and heavier engine block than the small block V8s. To help reduce costs the oil system was revised, as explained above. Although the 351W began as the basis for the 351C, by the time it reached production the design changes resulted in almost no parts interchanging between the two designs. The two engines, however, shared the same bore spacing, engine mounts and bell housing pattern.

The 351 Cleveland began production in July 1969 for the 1970 model year. Its actual displacement was 351.9 cubic inches (5,766 cc). A conventional two-barrel "2V" (two venturi) version and a four-barrel "4V" (four venturi) performance version were built. The 351C-2V was never marketed as a high-performance engine. It used the small port 2V cylinder heads with open combustion chambers to produce a more economical passenger car engine that was tuned more for low-rpm torque. The 351C-4V was marketed as a high-performance engine, featuring the 4V large ports heads with closed "quench" combustion chambers. Later versions of the 351C with 4V heads continued to use the large ports and valves, but switched to open chamber heads in an effort to reduce engine emissions. Only the Q-code 351 "Cobra Jet" (1971–1974), R-code "Boss" 351 (1971), and R-code 351 "HO" (1972) versions have four-bolt main bearing caps, however, all 335 series engines could be modified to have 4-bolt main bearing caps.

=== H-code ===
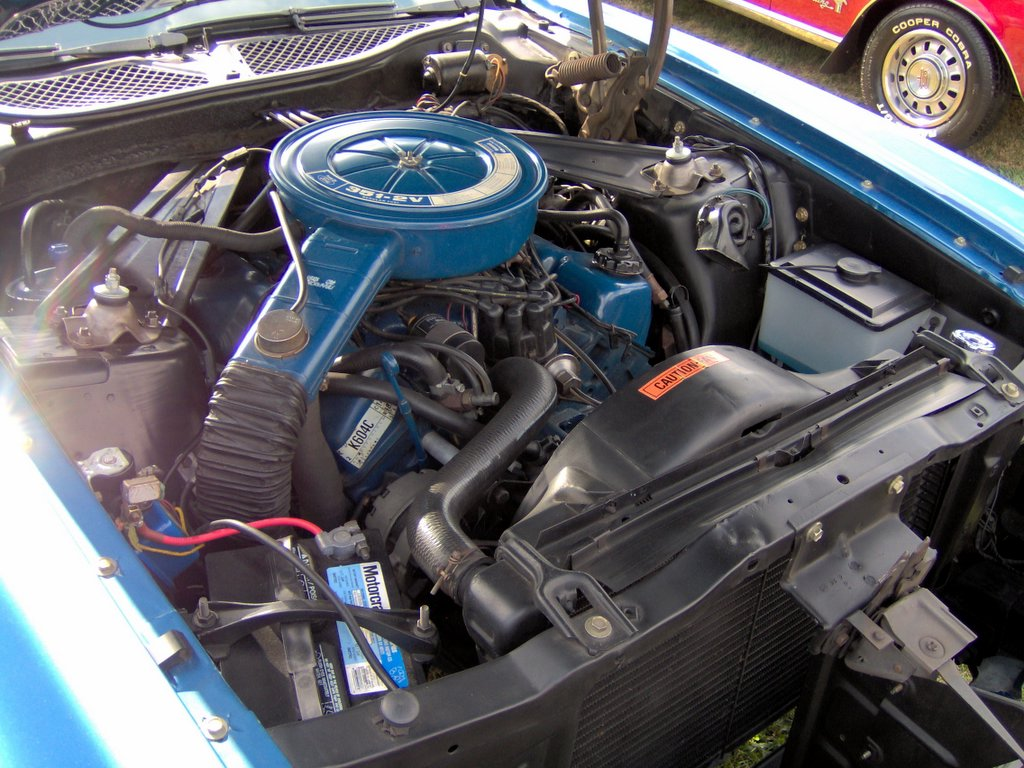
1973 H-code 2V 351 Cleveland

The H-code 351 Cleveland engines were low performance engines with low compression and two-barrel carburetors. All H-code engines ran on regular grade fuel. Compression ratio was 9.5:1 in 1970 and progressively dropped annually until it reached it low point of 8.0:1 compression in 1973 and 1974. H-code 351s were equipped with a cast-iron crankshaft, two-bolt main bearing caps, forged-steel connecting rods, cast-aluminum pistons, non-adjustable valve train, and cast-iron intake and exhaust manifolds. All H-code 351 Cleveland engines used the small port 2V heads with open combustion chambers. These engines were produced from 1970 through 1974 and were used on a variety of Ford models, from pony-car to full-sized. The 351W with a 2V carburetor was also produced during this time which also used the "H-code" designation. Both the 351W and 351C H-code had the same or very similar power ratings, and were used interchangeably when a car was built with the H-code engine option.

=== M-code ===
The M-code was a high-compression, high-performance variation of the 351C, produced in 1970 and 1971. The M-code engines used the large-port 4V heads with a closed "quench" combustion chamber and large valves. These engines also included cast-aluminum flat-top pistons, stiffer valve springs, a high-performance hydraulic camshaft, and a squarebore Autolite 4300-A carburetor. The 1970 engines had an advertised 11.0:1 compression ratio and were rated at 300 bhp (224 kW; 304 PS) at 5400 rpm. The 1971 version had a slightly lower advertised compression ratio of 10.7:1 due in part to the slightly larger combustion chambers, and the power rating dropped to 285 bhp (213 kW; 289 PS) at 5400 rpm. The M-code 351C required premium fuel and was available in the 1970-71 Ford Torino, Mercury Montego, Ford Mustang, and Mercury Cougar.

=== 1971 R-code (Boss 351) ===
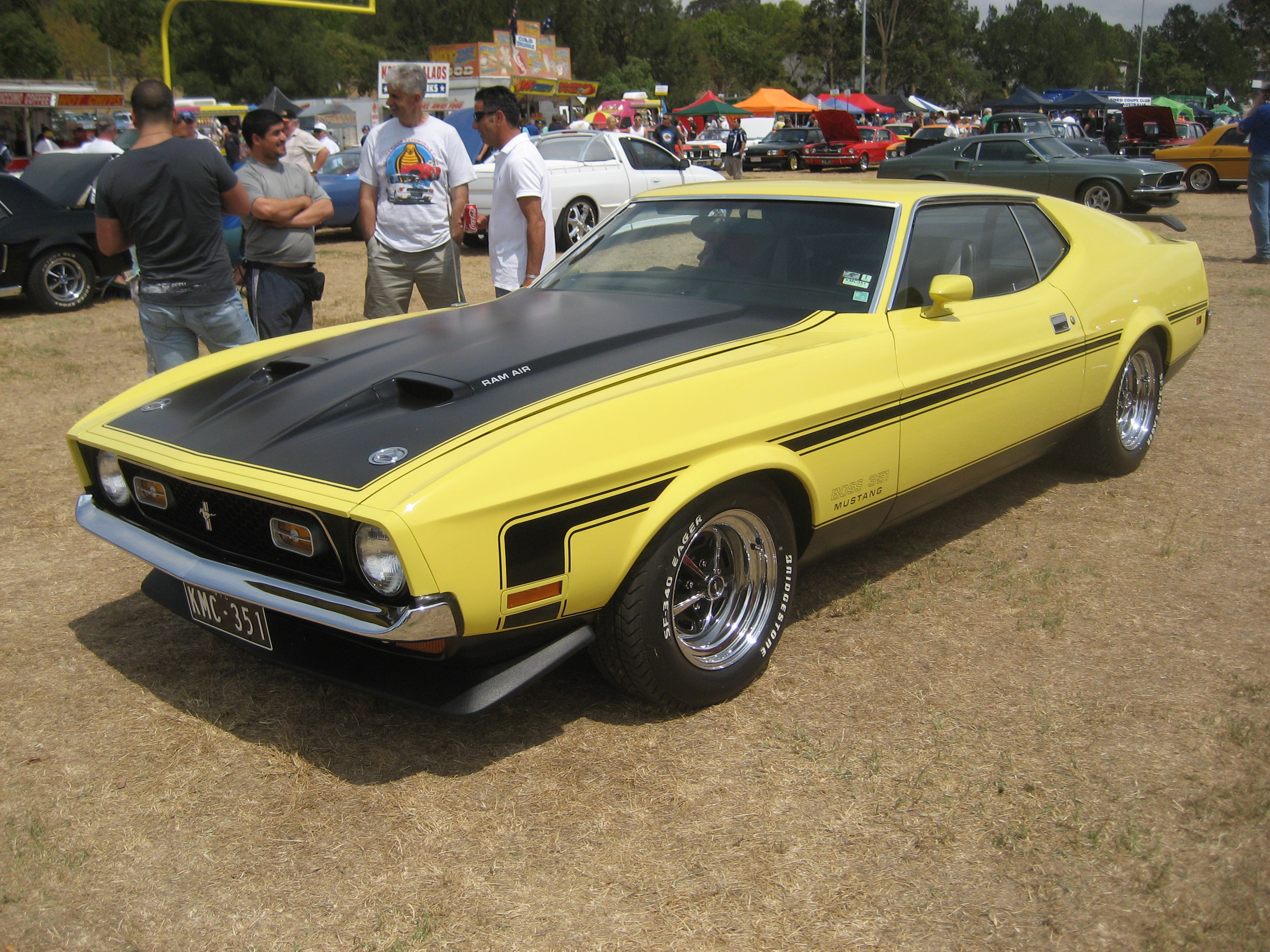
1971 Mustang Boss 351, the synonymous Ford model the R-code was built for

The Boss 351 was the most potent high-performance variant of the 351C available only in the 1971 Boss 351 Mustang. Rated at 330 bhp (246 kW), it was fitted with a four-barrel Autolite model 4300-D spreadbore carburetor, an aluminum intake manifold, solid lifters, dual-point distributor, a six-quart oil pan, and cast-aluminum valve covers. Forged domed pistons gave an 11.1:1 advertised compression ratio which made premium fuel necessary. It had four-bolt main bearing caps selected for hardness and a premium cast-iron crankshaft selected for hardness (90% nodularity). The cylinder head was modified for better airflow, used screw-in studs with adjustable rocker arms, and except for the water passages and larger combustion chambers, were very similar to the heads used on the Boss 302. The valve train used hardened and ground push rods with guide plates and single groove, hardened valve split locks. The forged connecting rods were shot-peened and magnafluxed for strength, and used improved durability 3/8-inch nuts and bolts. The R-code Boss 351 was only installed in the 1971 Boss 351 Mustang, and it came equipped with Ram Air induction. Ford manufactured 1,806 Boss 351 Mustangs in 1971, 591 of which are registered and accounted for on the Boss 351 Registry site.

The January 2010 issue of Hot Rod reported a project in which a Boss 351 was assembled to the exact internal specifications of an original motor, but fitted with open, long tube, 1-3/4-inch Hooker headers (vs. the stock cast-iron manifolds), a facility water pump, a 750 Holley Street HP-series carburetor (vs. the stock 715 CFM Autolite unit), and minus the factory air filter assembly, engine accessories, or factory exhaust system. In that externally modified state it produced 383 hp (286 kW) SAE gross at 6,100 rpm, and 391 lb⋅ft (530 N⋅m) torque (gross) at 4,000 rpm. A measurement of SAE net horsepower would be significantly lower, and represents a more realistic as-installed configuration with all engine accessories, air cleaner assembly, and automobile exhaust system.

=== 1972 R-code (351 HO) ===
The 351C HO "R-code" had a number of changes to help meet emission standards for 1972 compared to the 1971 Boss 351 "R-Code". The camshaft had less duration, but more valve lift, while the mechanical lifters remained unchanged. The forged pistons were changed to flat-top style and the heads to open chamber heads, but retained the same large ports, valves, and adjustable valve train used in 1971. This resulted in a compression ratio decreased to 9.2:1 while the cleaner-burning open-chamber heads helped meet the new emissions regulations. The Ram Air option was no longer available. The engine otherwise remained unchanged from 1971. This engine produced 275 hp (205 kW) using the more realistic SAE net system and was only available in the 1972 Ford Mustang. It was, however, now available in any body style or model of the Mustang, unlike the Boss 351. The 3.91 Traction Lok rear and four speed were still the only available drivetrain.

=== Q-code (351 Cobra-Jet) ===
The Q-code 351 "Cobra-Jet" (also called 351-CJ, 351-4V) was produced from May 1971 through the 1974 model year. It was a lower-compression design that used open-chamber 4V heads. The open-chamber heads exhibited superior emissions characteristics and were used to meet the more stringent emissions standards for 1972 and beyond. The "351 CJ" high-performance engine included a different intake manifold, high-lift, long-duration camshaft with hydraulic valve lifters, higher rate valve springs with dampers, a 715-CFM spread-bore 4300-D Motorcraft carburetor and a dual-point distributor (only with four-speed manual transmissions - not sold in California). The block was upgraded to four-bolt main bearing caps, and larger harmonic balancer was installed. These engines also featured induction-hardened exhaust seats for use with low-lead and unleaded gasoline. This engine was different from the 1970-71 M-code 351C having a more aggressive camshaft, a spread-bore carburetor, a four-bolt block and the lower compression allowed regular fuel to be used. It was rated at 280 bhp (209 kW; 284 PS) for all 1971 applications. For the 1972 model year, the only change to the engine was a retarding the camshaft events by 4°. The engine was rated at 266 hp (198 kW) (SAE net) for 1972 when installed in the Mustang, and 248 hp (185 kW) in the Torino and Montego. An increase in the combustion chamber size and the use of smaller valves occurred in 1973, which reduced horsepower to 246 hp (183 kW) for the four-barrel for the intermediate Fords, though it still retained the higher 266 hp (198 kW) rating in the Mustang. The 351 CJ (now referred to as the "351 4V") was rated at 255 hp (190 kW) in 1974 and was only installed in the Ford Ranchero, Ford Torino, Mercury Montego, and Mercury Cougar.

=== Replacement ===
Production of the 351C ceased at the end of the 1974 model year. The engine was replaced by the 351M for the 1975 model year. This new variation used the same bore and stroke dimensions of the 351C, but used the tall deck block from the 400 V8 engine and was only available with a 2 barrel carburetor.

=== 351C engine specifications chart ===
351 Cleveland engines
Code	Engine type	Years	Compression	Combustion Chamber	Camshaft Duration	Camshaft Lift	Tappets	Main Bearing Caps	Notes
H	351C-2V	1970–1974	Low	Open Chamber	258° I/266° E 32° overlap	0.400" I/0.406" E	Hydraulic	2-bolt	
M	351C-4V	1970–1971	High	Closed Chamber	266° I/ 270° E 34° overlap	0.427" I/0.427" E	Hydraulic	2-bolt	
R	351C-4V "Boss 351"	1971	High	Closed Chamber	290° I/ 290° E 58° overlap	0.467" I/0.477 E	Mechanical	4-bolt	Rare
R	351C-4V HO	1972	Low	Open Chamber	275° I/ 275° E 35° overlap	0.491" I/0.491" E	Mechanical	4-bolt	Very rare (Note: Only 398 Ford Mustangs with the 351C HO engine were produced, according to production data from Ford.)
Q	351C-4V CJ	May 1971 – 1974	Low	Open chamber	270° I/ 290° E 48° overlap	0.480" I/0.488" E	Hydraulic	4-bolt	cam timing retard 4° in 1972, compression reduced in 1973

== 400 and 351M ==
=== 400 ===
By 1970 the 390 V8 FE engine was becoming outdated. With pending emission requirements, a more modern replacement was needed. Although the big-block 385 family was used to replace the larger displacement 428 V8 FE engine, this engine family had nothing comparable in size to the 390 V8. For the 1971 model year, Ford introduced the 400 V8 engine as a replacement for the 390 V8. Ford billed the 400 as the 351C's big brother. It was designed to provide brisk acceleration in medium to heavy weight vehicles in an engine package that was smaller and lighter than the FE V8 Engines and the 385 Series Ford V8's.

The Ford 400 engine was based on the 351 Cleveland but had a half-inch longer stroke than the 351 Cleveland. The 400 had "square" proportions, with a 4.0 in (102 mm) bore and stroke. Ford called the engine a "400" but in actuality it displaced 402.1 cu in (6.6 L; 6,590 cc). To accommodate the longer stroke, Ford engineers increased the block deck height to 10.297 inches compared to the 351C's 9.206 inches. As a result, the 400 used longer (6.580 inch) connecting rods than the 351C (5.778 inch), but it retained the same connecting rod-to-stroke (1.65:1) ratio as the 351C. The 400 featured larger 3.00 inch main-bearing journals, the same size as those used in the 351 Windsor, but rod journals were the same size as the 351C. The cylinder heads for the 400 were the same as those used on the 351C-2V, having the open combustion chamber with smaller 2V-sized ports and valves. All 400s were low-performance engines that ran on regular fuel and all used a 2-barrel carburetor, a cast-iron intake manifold, and small port 2V cylinder heads. A 1-year only option 400 had flat top pistons, in 1971.

The 400 was designed as a high torque, low RPM engine that was a smaller, more efficient and lighter alternative for the big Ford 385 engines, the 429 and 460, for use in Ford's medium and large size cars. Weighing just 80% of a similar big-block, it was originally available in Ford's Custom, Galaxie and LTD lines, and in Mercury Monterey, Marquis, and Brougham for the 1971 model year. For 1972, it was also available in the Ford Torino, Mercury Montego and its variations through 1979. By the late 1970s it was also available in the Ford Thunderbird, Ford F-series pickup trucks, the Lincoln Continental, and Mark V.

Unlike the 351C, almost all 400 blocks used the large bell housing bolt pattern used by the 385 family big-block and were typically equipped with the higher torque-capacity C6 transmission. There were a small number of 400 block castings produced in 1973 with the dual bell housing patterns. It had the large bell housing and the small bell housing bolt pattern used by the small block V8 family and the 351C, though it was not necessarily drilled for both. These particular blocks have been dubbed the "400 FMX" by enthusiasts, though were never officially referenced as such by Ford. Most 400's also had unique engine mount bolt pattern but these 400 FMX blocks had provisions for both 351C-style and 400/351M engine mounts. For 1972, the compression ratio was reduced through the use of dished pistons. The compression was reduced again for 1973 and a new timing set retarded the camshaft timing 6° to aid with reducing emissions. Changes to the cylinder heads for 1975 to add the Thermactor emission system caused the exhaust port to be more restrictive than the earlier 1971-74 heads. The 400 was re-tuned by Ford in 1975 to use unleaded gasoline with the addition of catalytic converters to the exhaust system. An extra water jacket was added to the heads, along with further enlarging the combustion chamber to 80 cc.

The development of the 400 V8 led to a significant design flaw that remained with the engine throughout its production life. With a longer stroke, the compression ratio became excessively high with the 351-2V heads and flat top pistons. Ford engineers reduced the compression ratio by using a piston with a compression height that was too short and this led to an excessive deck clearance of 0.067" to .080" compared to a 351-2V at 0.035" . In 1971, this method of reducing compression was sufficient due to the higher-octane leaded fuels. However, once lower-octane unleaded fuels became used, the excessive deck clearance led to problems with detonation. For 1975, Ford dealt with this problem by decreasing the compression ratio further with a larger 15cc piston dish and reducing ignition timing. However, the 400 V8 obtained a reputation for being prone to detonation.

Today, an array of performance parts are becoming more available for the "M" engines, with a resurgence of popularity in the classic truck market.

=== 351M ===
Engine dimensions
	351C	400	351M
Nominal main bearing size	2.750 in (69.8 mm)	3.000 in (76.2 mm)	3.000 in (76.2 mm)
Rod length	5.78 in (146.8 mm)	6.58 in (167.1 mm)	6.58 in (167.1 mm)
Rod-to-Stroke Ratio	1.65:1	1.65:1	1.88:1
Deck height	9.206 in (233.8 mm)	10.297 in (261.5 mm)	10.297 in (261.5 mm)

When the 351 Cleveland was discontinued after the 1974 model year, Ford needed another engine in that size range, since production of the 351 Windsor was not sufficient. Ford took the 400 engine's tall-deck block and installed a crankshaft with a shorter 3.5 in (89 mm) stroke to produce a 351 cubic inches (5.8 L) engine. This crankshaft was not the same as a 351C, in that it used the larger 3.0 in (76 mm) main bearing journals of the 400 V8. To compensate for the shorter stroke the pistons for the 351M have a taller compression height, so that it could use the same connecting rods as the 400. The result of the 351M using the longer 400 connecting rod was a higher connecting rod-to-stroke ratio of 1.88:1 than the 351C and 400's of 1.65:1. Other than pistons and crankshaft the 351M shared all of its major components with the 400, and it also used the large 385 Series style bellhousing. The 351M was only ever equipped with a 2-barrel carburetor and open chamber small port 2V cylinder heads.

351M production began for the 1975 model year and blocks were cast in the Michigan Casting Center or the Cleveland Foundry. The 351M was the last pushrod V8 block designed by Ford until the introduction of the 7.3-liter "Godzilla" engine for the Super Duty trucks in model year 2020.

=== Light truck usage ===
For the 1977 model year, Ford replaced its FE big-block 360 and 390 engines in its light truck line with its new 351M and 400 engines. For light-truck use, a manual transmission could be ordered for the first time with these engines. As a result, the block was strengthened in the main bearing supports, in particular the #3 support to better handle the loads imparted by the clutch. The truck engines had unique parts including pistons for different compression ratios from the car engines, truck specific intake and exhaust manifolds, camshaft with more lift, and timing set that did not retard the camshaft timing. The strengthened engine block was introduced to the Ford cars for the 1978 model year.

=== Block-cracking problems ===
The 400 V8s for the model years 1971–72 were either cast in the Dearborn Iron Foundry or the Cleveland Foundry. Those built for model years 1973–79 were either cast in the Cleveland Foundry or the Michigan Casting Center. The 351M introduced in 1975 shared the same block as the 400. The 351M and 400 blocks cast at the Michigan Casting Center prior to March 2, 1977, experienced water jacket cracking problems above the lifter bores. The cracking was (potentially) caused by an internal coring problem when the blocks were cast, although others considered it to be normal freeze cracking. The result was horizontal cracks approximately 1" above the lifter bore. After March 2, 1977, the blocks cast at Michigan Casting Center did not have problems with cracking.

=== 351M/400 identification confusion ===
There exists debate as to what Ford meant by the "M" designation of the 351M. Some claim the "M" stands for “Modified” - being modified from a 400-V8 with a shortened stroke - though others claim that the "M" refers to the Michigan Casting Center, where the 351M began production. Some say that the "M" designation has no official meaning, and that it was just Ford's way of distinguishing the 351M from the 351C and 351W. Ford master part catalogs reference the engine as a Modified.

Likewise, Ford's use of the 400 block in the creation of the 351M engine has resulted in the 400 mistakenly being referred to as the "400M" or "400 Modified." This is despite the 400 having been the design basis from which the "modified" 351M was derived and it was in production several years before Ford used the "M" designation. Further confusion arises from Ford printing "351M/400" on the emission stickers for the engine. The "351M/400" referenced the engine family, and some confused this with the engine name. This sticker also listed the engine displacement below the engine family. Ford's official name for the 400 V8 contains no additional designations - the proper nomenclature is simply "400." In the early 1970s before the 351M debuted, Ford referred to the 400 as the "400 Cleveland".

=== Replacement ===
The 351M and 400 were last offered in a Ford passenger car in 1979. They remained available in Ford light-trucks until 1982. Reduced demand for larger engines due to tightening CAFE regulations led to the abandonment of the 351M/400 and the Cleveland production line. By 1980, mid-sized V8's had disappeared from the option list for almost all Ford cars. Only the full-size Panther platform Fords had anything larger than 302 ci available, and this need was filled with the 351W. With low demand for engines in the size range of the 351M/400, the 335-series V8's no longer had a need to be produced.

In addition, there were difficulties adapting the M-block to the second generation of emissions controls. Unlike previous Ford engines, Thermactor and exhaust gas recirculation features had already been built into the 351M and 400 engine, rendering adaptation to electronic feedback fuel/air systems difficult. One requirement of the second-generation equipment was an oxygen (O_{2}) sensor in the exhaust, which had to be placed before the Thermactor air was added. Since Thermactor air was injected right into the block's exhaust ports in the M-block, there was nowhere for the O_{2} sensor to go.

== 302 and 351 Cleveland (Australia) ==
Note that there was also a 302 "small block"

=== History ===
During the 1969 Model year, Ford of Australia imported approximately 17,000 302 and 351 Windsor V8's. However, the 351 Windsor was phased out for 1970 in favor of the newer 351 Cleveland. The 351 Cleveland engines continued to be imported from the US along with the 302 V8. Both the low-performance 351C-2V and the high performance 351C-4V were imported with the vast majority of the engines being the 351C-2V. Like the US engines, the 4V versions used the closed "quench" chambered heads and used the larger ports on the cylinder heads.

In November 1971, Ford of Australia began to manufacture the 335-series V8 locally at the Geelong engine plant. They produced both the 351C-2V and 351C-4V engine along with a short stroke version displacing 302 cubic inches. These new locally built engines replaced the previously imported 302 and 351C from the USA. Initially, the cylinder blocks were imported from the US, while the remaining parts were manufactured in Australia at the Geelong Ford Foundry. In 1973, Ford of Australia received word of the fact the Ford of USA was stopping production of the 351 Cleveland engine after the 1974 model year. As a result, Ford of Australia placed an order for approximately 60,000 engine blocks to act as a supply until Geelong could start producing its own engine blocks. In 1975 Geelong began casting its own engine blocks which it continued until December 1981. All engine blocks produced in Australia were the short deck, 9.206 in (234 mm) tall engine block. The last Australian Ford to receive a Cleveland V8 engine was a Ford XE Fairmont Ghia ESP sedan, Vehicle Identification Number JG32AR33633K built on 25 November 1982. Ford Australia continued to produce the 351C, making it available in locally assembled Bronco and F-series vehicles until August 1, 1985. The very last 351 Cleveland V8 engine made in Australia was installed in a 4WD Ford Bronco. More than 250,000 Cleveland V8s were built at Geelong in total, 12,020 of them being installed in commercial vehicles.

Australian-built 351 engines were also used by De Tomaso in Italy for the Pantera, Longchamp, and Deauville cars after American supplies had come to an end. These engines were tuned in Switzerland and were available with a range of outputs up to 360 PS (265 kW; 355 hp).

=== 302 Cleveland ===
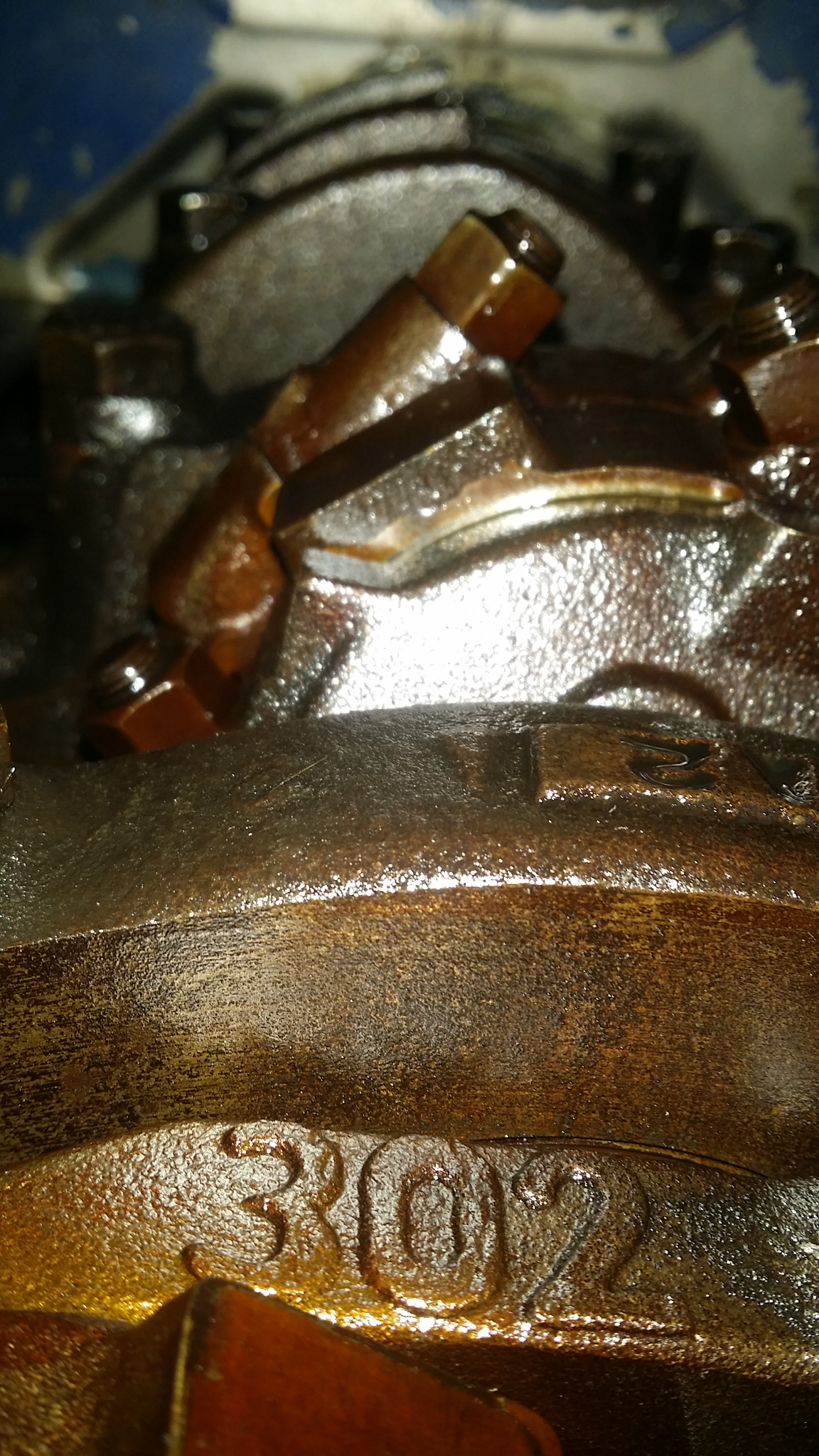
An Australian factory-forged 302 Cleveland crankshaft in-situ. The number "302" confirms its intended displacement.

In November 1971, Ford of Australia began to manufacture the 301.6 cu in (4.9 L; 4,942 cc) Cleveland engine at the Geelong engine plant alongside of the 351C. The engine remained in production until 1982 and was only produced in Australia. The 302C was considered an economy V8 and it is estimated that only ten percent of Australian Cleveland V8 production was the 302C. The 302C was created by using the 351C block with a crankshaft that had a 3.0 in (76 mm) stroke while it shared the 2.75" main journal size of the 351C. The 302C had a 6.020 in (152.91 mm) connecting rod to allow it to share the same piston as the 351C. This resulted in a connecting rod-to-stroke ratio of 2.01:1, making it the highest ratio of the 335 series V8s. The 302C used a unique cylinder head compared to the Australian 351C to ensure an adequate compression ratio. The 302C had used the "quench" closed combustion chamber with a volume of 56.4–59.4 cc, the smallest of any 335 series engine cylinder head. This head used the small 2V ports and valves, making it the only 335 series head with the closed chambers and small 2V ports.

The combination of the closed chamber heads with the small 2V ports has caused the 302C head to be a bolt-on-performance upgrade for other 335 series V8s. Having the smallest combustion chamber of the 335 series V8s, these cylinder heads will easily boost the static compression ratio of any other 335 series V8. In addition, the small ports used on these head are more efficient for a street performance engine than the large port 4V heads that tend to favour performance only at higher engine speeds.

=== 351 Cleveland ===
Initially, the 351C was imported to Australia from the US. Both the 351-2V and 351-4V were imported and both were in all respects the same as the American market counterparts. In November 1971, Ford of Australia began producing its own 351C engines, ending the importation of American engines. At the outset, Australia only produced a 351-2V engine, but in March 1972 Ford of Australia began to offer a new 351-4V engine with a 4-barrel carburetor. Australia only produced one style of cylinder head for the 351 engines, a 2V head with small ports and open chamber cylinder heads. As a result, the Australian 351-4V engines used the 2V cylinder head. This required a unique 4V intake manifold with the smaller 2V ports, unlike the American 351-4V intake manifold which used the large ports. No 351C built in Australia used the large port cylinder heads or closed chamber combustion chambers like the US built 351C-4V engines.

Ford Australia built a quantity of 4-bolt 5.8 litre engines — similar to those used in NASCAR at the time — for race purposes in Australia. When the engine's local racing career ended at the end of 1984, the surplus stock was shipped to Italy for use in the De Tomaso Pantera, as Detroit no longer offered the 351 Cleveland engine.

== See also ==
- Ford 385 engine
- List of Ford engines
