= Autolite 2100 carburetor =

Carburetor made by Autolite (1957–1973)

The Autolite 2100 is a two venturi (barrel) carburetor manufactured in multiple variants by Autolite from 1957 to 1973. Eight sizes ranging from 190 cfm to 424 cfm were made, all with synchronized venturis, variously with manual, electric, or automatic hot-air chokes. The design incorporates a feature called Annular Fuel Discharge, which greatly reduces the likelihood of hesitation and flat spots under acceleration. It shares the standard Holley two-barrel bolt pattern. It was succeeded by the Motorcraft 2150 carburetor.

Flow rate is determined by the diameter of the venturi, which was cast into the float chamber side as a number within a circle representing the venturi size in inches:

0.98 - 190 cfm, 1.01 - 240 cfm, 1.02 - 245 cfm, 1.08 - 287 cfm, 1.14 - 300 cfm, 1.21 - 351 cfm, 1.23 - 356 cfm, 1.33 - 424 cfm

== Users ==
The Ford Motor Company and American Motors Corporation both used Autolite carburetors in many of their motor vehicles, joined in the 1970s by Jeep (then built by AMC).
