= Ford Mustang variants =

Modified versions of a car by Ford

Ford Mustang variants are the various versions of the Ford Mustang car, modified either by its manufacturer Ford Motor Company or by third-party companies. Ford and several third-party companies have offered many modified versions of the highly popular Mustang since its creation in 1964 in order to cater to specific portions of the marketplace outside of the mainstream. High-performance enthusiasts seek more powerful, sharper handling, sports cars such as the Shelby Mustang, the Ford Mustang Mach 1, and variants made by Roush Performance and Saleen, while collectors and purists seek limited production and alternate or nostalgic styling, such as is commonly found on many commemorative editions. Still, others were made purely for experimental concepts such as the McLaren M81 and the Ford Mustang SVO, which later influenced production model design. Most variants include both performance upgrades, and unique cosmetic treatments that are typically minimal to maintain the familiar appearance of a stock Mustang. Although most of these Mustang variants were aimed at enthusiasts, an exception was the Special Service Package which was designed specifically for law enforcement. Race variants include the FR500, Boss 302 and Boss 429.

== Ford ==
=== Concepts ===
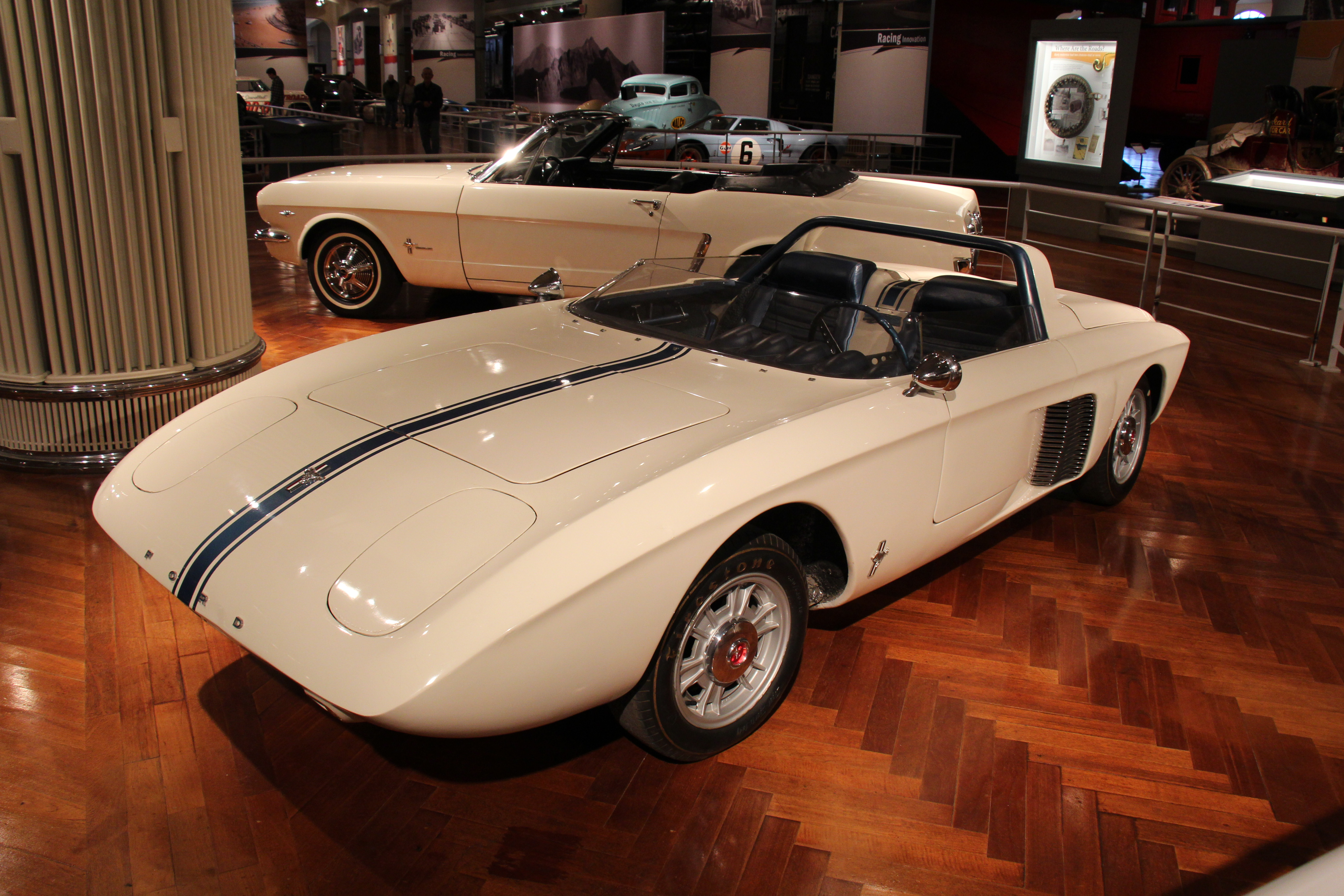
Ford Mustang I concept

==== 1962 Ford Mustang I concept ====
The Ford Mustang I was a small, mid-engined (4-cylinder), open two-seater with aluminum body work, that began life as a design exercise and eventually became the progenitor of the famed Ford Mustang. Although it shared few design elements with the final production vehicle, it did lend its name to the line.

==== 1963 Ford Mustang II ====
The Ford Mustang II is a small, front-engined (V8), open "two-plus-two" concept car built by the Ford Motor Company in 1963. Although bearing the same name as the first generation production Mustang, the four-seater Mustang II which closely resembled the final production variant that would appear in 1964, was intended primarily for the auto show circuit. After debuting at the 1963 Watkins Glen Grand Prix, the Mustang II had a short lifespan as a show car before being relegated to the task of "test mule". The sole example still exists, albeit in storage at the Detroit Historical Museum.

==== 1993 Ford Mustang Mach III concept ====
Unveiled in 1993 at the Detroit International Auto Show, this concept gave us a peek into the Mustang's near future. Although not all that close in design to the actual 1994 production model, it did offer Mustang fanatics some insight and hints on where Ford was going with their flagship. It was powered by a supercharged 4.6L DOHC V-8 supplying 450 hp (336 kW).

==== 2004 Ford Mustang GT concept ====
The concept 2004 Mustang GT coupe and convertible were debuted at the 2003 North American International Auto Show. They were designed after the production 2004 Mustang was finalized to gauge public reaction to the design.

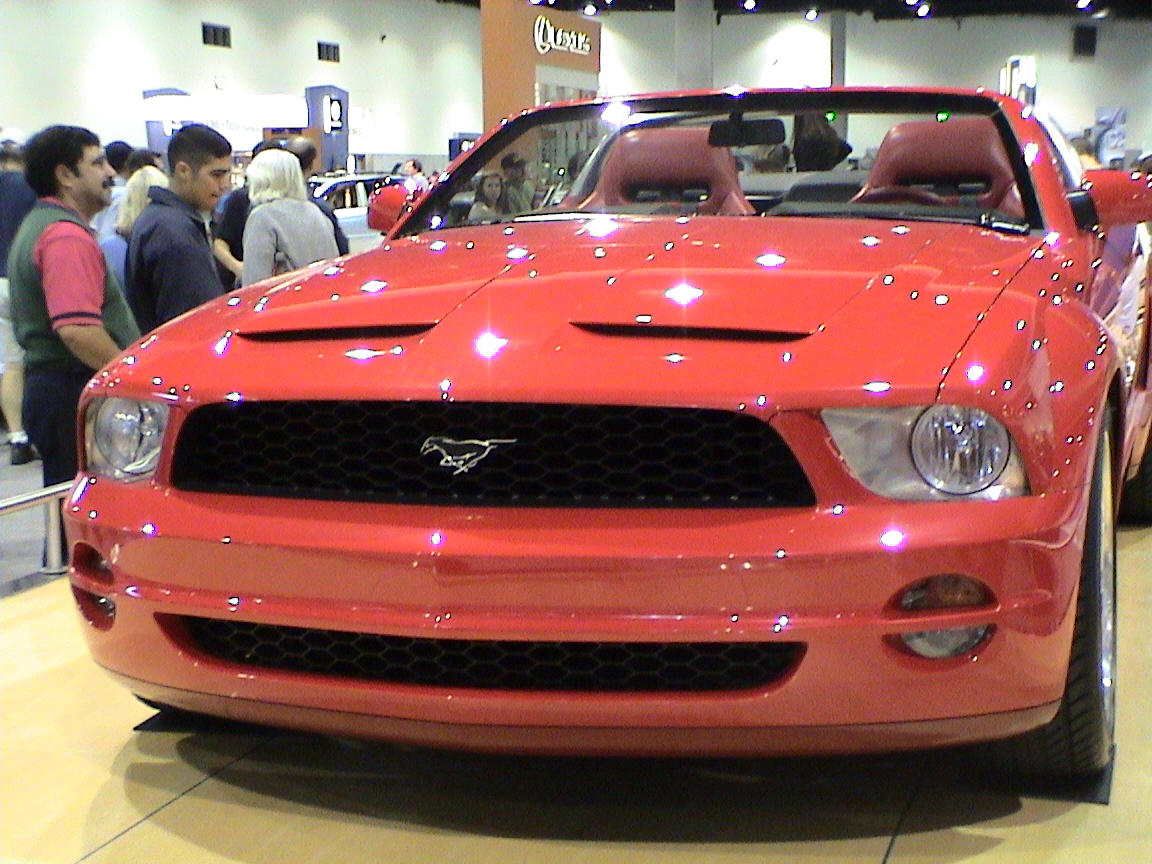
2005 Ford Mustang convertible concept (exterior)

The design of the 2004 Mustang was created from scratch, the first in 23 years. However, the latest version draws heavily on the design both the 1967–1968 Mustang and Shelby GT 350/GT500. Ironically, the original Mustang was an American interpretation of European design aimed at the youngest, fastest-growing segment of the market – Baby Boomers – while the latest version interprets American design through a European lens for aging Baby Boomers.

The 2-seater Mustang GT was powered by a 400 hp (300 kW) supercharged 4.6L V-8, mated to a 6-speed manual in the coupe and a 5-speed automatic transmission in the convertible. The hood has twin scoops sitting in a U-shaped channel, topped by separate body color panels. This elongates the hood section, creates tailored character lines that flow into the instrument panel's twin cowl upper section, and provides cold air ducting the supercharged V8.

Notable features on the Mustang GT include 20-inch wheels, a nose which leans forward, and a side scoop. For the first time in the Mustang's nearly 40-year existence, the scoop is a fully integrated design element that creates a triangular opening, and flows forward along the chamfered lower body line.

The interior is trimmed in red leather, black accents, brushed aluminum, and borders on parody with red leather racing style seats draped over black forms atop aluminum pedestals. Similarly, the dash pad "eyebrows" overlook a metal band containing the gauges and vents, and the red lower section.

The tail section divides lights into three units on either side of a large badge reminiscent of early Mustang filler caps. There is a similarity of the tail lamps' angled upper section to that of the Australian-built Capri convertible of the early 1990s.

==== 2005 Mustang GT-R Concept ====
The GT-R was a concept by Ford to signal a focus on the racing market. The concept car had a new 5.0 "Cammer" V8 engine with 440 hp (328 kW) and a wider body. Its Valencia Orange color was inspired by Grabber Orange 1970 Mustang Boss 302 Trans-Am race cars. Notable design changes from the base model included GT-R wheels, Brembo brakes, Pirelli slick tires and a more aggressive look.

==== Giugiaro Mustang concept ====
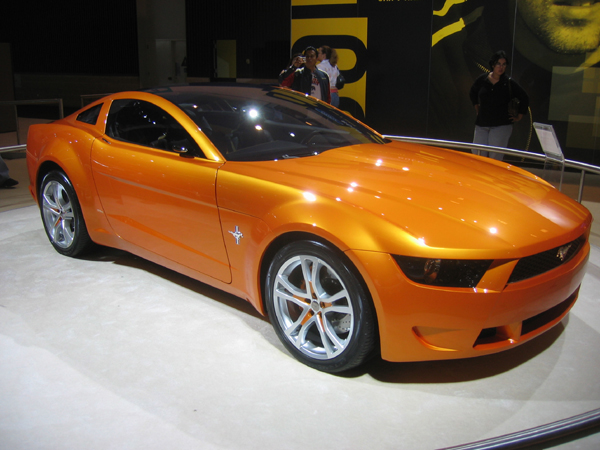
Ford Mustang Giugiaro concept at Moscow motor show "InterAuto 2007"

At the 2006 Greater Los Angeles Auto Show, Ford debuted the Giugiaro Mustang concept car. It was designed by the Italian car design firm, Italdesign, and led by Fabrizio Giugiaro. Italdesign, led by senior Giorgetto Giugiaro, is famous for designing the 2003 Chevrolet Corvette Moray concept as well as the Ferrari GG50 concept and the 1965 Bertone Mustang, becoming the first European-styled car to debut internationally in America following World War II. The Italian design firm has a long history of car designs ranging from Fiat, Alfa Romeo, Volkswagen, and Mazda, to Lotus, Maserati and Bugatti.

"When we saw the new Mustang, we knew two things: It was the best we'd seen since the original, and we had to get our hands on one," said Fabrizio Giugiaro, styling director of Italdesign – Giugiaro S.P.A. "We still believe it's important to show the automotive world pure exercises in style that interpret key models reflecting the history and image of important brands."

=== Production ===
==== Ford T-5 ====
In addition to selling the Mustang in North America, Ford saw the importance of marketing the sporty car overseas as well, especially to American military personnel. However, the name "Mustang" was copyrighted by German manufacturing conglomerate Krupp for a small truck, which prevented Ford from using the name there. Therefore, Ford re-badged Mustangs bound for export to Germany with the T-5 name. All references to the Mustang name, including the steering wheel hub, side nameplates, the grille, and rear fuel filler, were blanked out, replaced by the words "FORD" only. The "T-5" emblem graced the front fender behind the wheel well, where the "Mustang" nameplate (and horse emblem) were located on other Mustangs.

Other than this, they were exactly the same as Mustangs elsewhere. Virtually all models and packages for the Mustang were available for the T-5 including the GT. After 1979 Krupp's brand rights on the Mustang name expired, so all Mustangs imported to Germany after 1980 kept the name Mustang.

The T-5 designation also applied to the 13 prototypes that were built before the first generation Mustang went into production. The 1963 Ford Mustang II concept car also briefly bore the T-5 designation. In 1962, Ford Vice-president Lee Iacocca leading the Fairlane Group (a committee of Ford managers and executives) began to work on a front-engine, four-seater design, known as the T-5 in company parlance, and later, the Mustang. To speed development, Ford Falcon and Fairlane components were used. Nearly the only design element that remained from the original Mustang I were the fake louvers that recreated the radiator scoops of the two-seater, and its name, emblazoned on its side panels as the "galloping Mustang" logo.

==== High Country Special ====
The High Country Mustangs were manufactured from 1966 (333), 1967 (400) and 1968 (251), as a special promotion vehicle for Colorado-area Ford dealers, the first two years of High Country Specials were little more than special exterior colors and a triangular HCS emblem for all body styles. For '68, the HCS became a hardtop only and borrowed the front foglights, sidescoops, and Shelby rear end treatments so as not to be confused with the Challenger Special of 1968 that only came with a standard tail housing.

==== Ski Country Special ====
The Ski Country Special was a region specific, dealer promotional package available in the winter of 1967 and was not limited to the Mustang line. The combination of features identifying a Ski Country Special were: a ski rack, "coffee bar" (luggage rack), a limited slip axle, a unique emblem and two snow tires. The SCS package also included five new colors: "Vail Blue", "Aspen Red", "Winter Park Turquoise", "Loveland Green" and "Breckenridge Yellow".

==== Challenger Special ====
In mid-April 1968, the Mississippi Ford Dealers DSO 64 (New Orleans) began to offer a dealer-built, limited-edition Mustang, called the Challenger, or "Challenger Special". The concept was for a power packing 302 4v in a plain wrapper coupe, in rare cases they were fitted with Shelby manifolds and 4118 Holley carburetors. In late April, at least 7 units came with the obsolete 289 4v while in early to mid May 1968 they included 21 units out of 154 that were all J-code 302 4v's with specially geared 3 speeds in a "lightened" chassis (no power options, aluminum intake, no a/c). The power-to-weight ratio in the Challenger gave the budget-minded buyer a chance to run with the Shelby Models without the cost. Similar 289/302 4v performance models were offered by dealers in other DSOs during the 1968 model year, including some convertibles and fastbacks in addition to the coupes.

==== Boss Mustangs ====
===== 302 =====
For 1969–70, The Boss 302 was produced for the Trans-Am racing series. It later became the most popular Boss Mustang that Ford produced. For 2012, the FR500 was replaced by racing variants of the Mustang Boss 302. There are two variants, the Boss 302R (Racing) for use in the IMSA Continental Tire Sports Car Challenge and the Boss 302S (Sprint) for other racing series such as the SCCA Pirelli World Challenge GTS class.

===== 351 =====
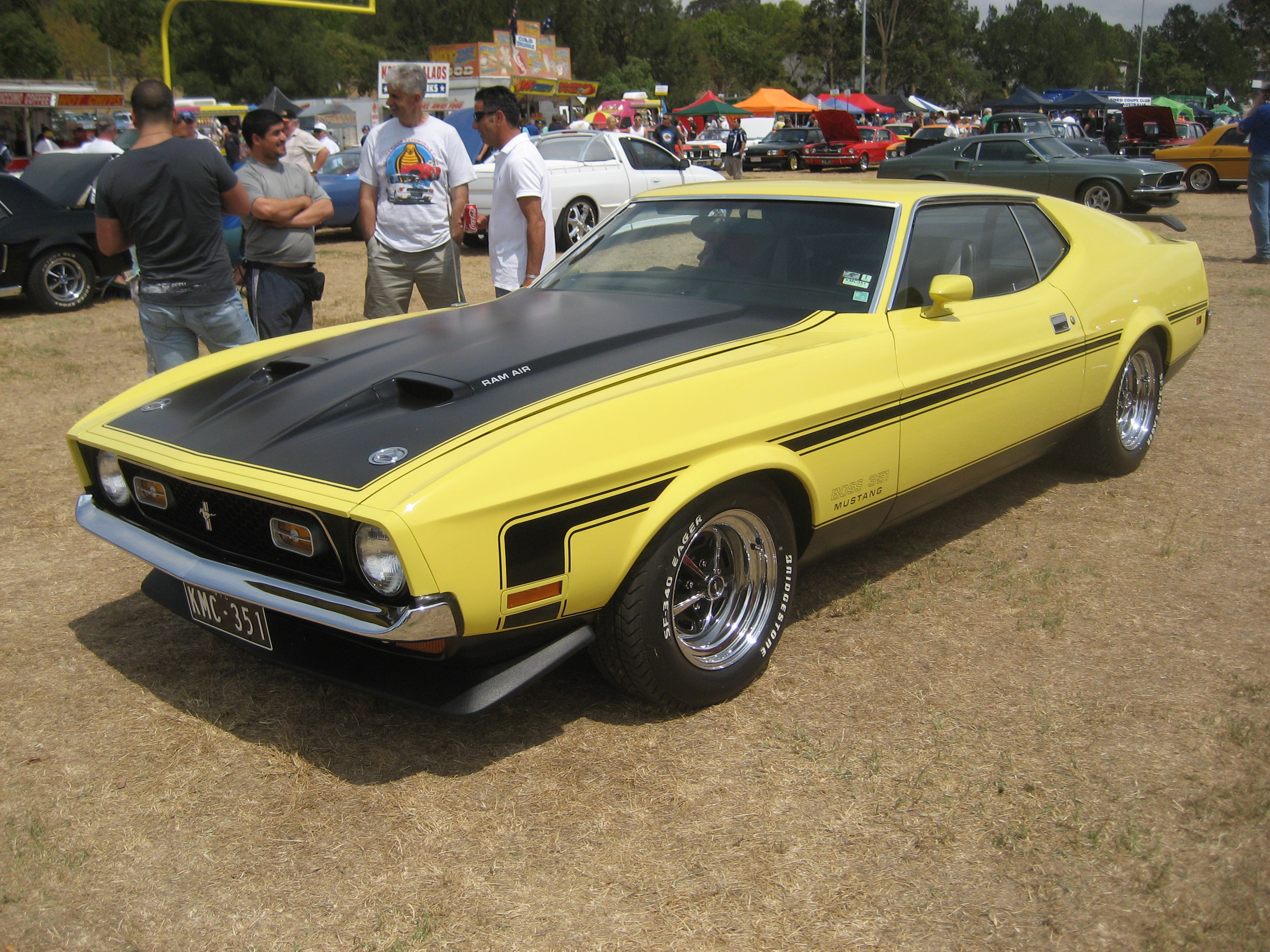
Ford Mustang Boss 351

Introduced in November 1970, the Boss 351 Mustang became one of the last high performance models of the Mustang line. It was based on the Mustang SportsRoof model and replaced both the Boss 302 and the Boss 429 models. The Boss 351 engine was a 351 Cleveland four barrel engine with a mechanical cam, solid lifters, 11.0:1 compression ratio, aluminum intake, and a 4 bolt main bearing block. It was topped with an all-new 750 CFM Ford 4 barrel carburetor. The Boss 351 engine produced 330 horsepower at 5,400 rpm.

===== 429 =====
The Boss 429 Mustang debuted in January 1969. It was built primarily to allow Ford to campaign the special engine in the NASCAR racing circuit. NASCAR's rules stated that for any "trick" part or engine to be considered legal, it had to be installed on at least 500 cars that were sold to the public. The Boss 429 engine was rated at over 370 hp. It featured aluminum heads, with huge, free-flowing intake and exhaust ports, a crescent shaped combustion chamber, and large oversized valves which were set at an angle so that the intake valve was close to the intake manifold and the exhaust valve was close to the exhaust manifold. The standard 735 CFM Holley carburetor was mounted on a high rise intake manifold.

==== Mach 1 ====
The Ford Mustang Mach 1 was a performance model of the Ford Mustang that Ford produced beginning in 1969. The original production run of the Mach 1 ended in 1978.

In 2003 and 2004 the "Mach 1" nameplate returned. Ford introduced the new Mach 1 to keep interest in the current Mustang high until the release of the S-197 with yet another special-edition Mustang. The Mach 1 used a non-supercharged aluminum block with DOHC with only a forged crank on manual models. The Cobra used a 4.6 DOHC V8 as well, however it was a cast-iron block with forged internals and a supercharger, they are commonly mistaken to have the same block. It was conservatively rated at 305 hp (310 hp in 2004). Other special features included "retro" interior styling, with seats made to look like the "comfortweave" seats in the original Mach 1s, old-style gauges, and aluminum pedals and shifter. Outside, the Mach 1 featured a striping package and blacked-out spoiler designed to mimic the original Mach 1, "Magnum 500" styled 17-inch (430 mm) wheels, and a "Shaker" hoodscoop. The "Shaker" was so named because it was attached to the engine and stuck out through a hole in the hood, and would move with the torque of the motor. Ford utilized the same casting for the new "Shaker" that they had for the 1969 model year. Despite having camshafts that produce power at lower rpm, the Mach 1's 4.6 produced as much power as the '01 Cobra, in part to the revised 4-valve heads, and an increase in compression from 9.85:1 to 10:1. The Mach 1 was also equipped with 3.55:1 rear gears, making it capable of very low 13-second 1/4 mile ETs and ~106 mph trap speeds with an experienced drag driver.

==== Mustang Cobra II ====
The Cobra II was produced from 1976 until the end of production for the Mustang II in 1978. The Cobra II was an appearance package only and offered no true performance upgrades; it was available with the 2.3L four-cylinder and the 2.8L V6 in addition to the 5.0L 302 V8 engine. In 1976 and most of 1977, the Cobra II package was installed by Motortown Corporation for Ford. Starting in late 1977 Ford installed the Cobra II package itself, this continued until the end of production in 1978.

==== King Cobra ====
The King Cobra was produced only for 1978. Its only available engine was the 5.0L V8. The King Cobra was the first Mustang to carry the 5.0 badge.

==== Mustang SVT Cobra ====
The Ford Mustang SVT Cobra was built by Ford from 1993 to 2004, except 2000, due to engine power issues that surfaced with the 1999 model. The Cobra R was built that year though. The SVT Cobra returned to the 2001 lineup after Ford sorted out the engine issue. The SVT Cobra represented the highest performance version of the Mustang built by Ford, sitting in the model range above the Mustang GT model. On rare occasions, Ford produced a higher-performance Cobra R variant.

Special-colored editions of the SVT Cobra (as well as other Ford Mustang variants) have been produced, which are shown below:

1996 SVT Mystic Cobra
In 1996, Ford approved a new paint technology created by BASF to be showcased on a limited number of SVT Cobras. This paint was called "Mystic". Based on traditional black pigment paint it uses a special line of color-shifting interference pigments made by Flex Products, Inc called ChromaFlair pigments. Depending on the angle of the viewer in relation to the car, or the angle of the light hitting the surface, the paint will actually seem to have changed color. These color changes go from an almost solid black to emerald green, violet blue, magenta, burgundy, amber/gold, even an almost "root-beer" brown. Unlike other paints that create special effects by using a blend of pigments or tricky multi coat applications of different colors of paint, the Mystic paint achieves its dramatic color-change capability via tiny transparent layered flakes in the paint's chemistry that act like prisms to break up white light into its various component colors. All Cobras produced with the Mystic paint were only offered in coupe form. While the Mystic paint made specifically for the 1996 Cobra was never meant to be made again, there has since been many varieties of color shifting paints created in the years that followed.

Saleen SR with Extreme Paint Mystic Paint
After the production of the 1996 Mystic Cobra, BASF created a one-off Saleen Speedster using a variation of the Mystic color to be given away in their "Horse Of A Different Color" contest. From there Saleen added a color to their Mustang lineup called "Saleen Extreme" which was a much lighter version of the Mystic color changing paint from 1996. At more than $11,000, this was considered an expensive option.

2000 Mystic Gold Cobra
Ford has since produced a few more color-shifting paint jobs for the Mustang Cobra, utilizing variations of the Mystic theme that was first used in 1996. At least two Cobras utilizing color-shifting paint jobs were produced, although one was canceled before it even went into production. The first one that was developed in 2000 was called Mystic Gold. Inspired by the 1996 Mystic Cobra, the proposed color-shifting paint was meant to be applied into a limited number of SVT Cobras like the previous one, and would have used the same combination of color-shifting pigments and other elements such as multilayered transparent flakes to achieve the color changing effect, similar to the original 1996 Mystic paint. At most angles, the Mystic Gold paint looked to be bright solid gold color, but under the right light it would change to a bright yellow or green color. Only a few examples of the Mystic Gold Cobra were produced, all of which were coupe models. Unfortunately, due to several problems with the 1999 Cobra, the 2000 SVT Cobras never made it to production as Ford canceled plans for the 2000 models after the 1999 Cobra debacle, and as a result, the 2000 Mystic Gold Cobra never released alongside it. Also, with Ford making changes to its painting process during 2001, the Mystic Gold paint was found to be incompatible with the new process, making them unable to produce a color-shifting paint job for 2001. As a result, the proposed color-shifting paint was most likely discarded.

2004 Mystichrome Cobra
In 2004, SVT released yet another "Mystic" Cobra, this time resulting in color shifts from a bright, metallic topaz that transitions to cobalt blue, then to royal purple, and finally into a deep onyx black. Ford's color and trim director for North America Alan Eggly described the new paint color like this: "The bright, iridescent colors reminded me of chromed exhaust headers blued by intense heat". Thus, he dubbed the new paint "Mystichrome". This new car also added to the extreme look of the Mystic Cobra by adding a unique feature beyond the paint itself, a color shifting leather interior that also utilized the same Mystichrome paint. Satisfied with the exterior hue, Eggly and the Ford Special Vehicle Team turned their attention to the interior. "The interior needed something special to complement the stunning exterior," says Eggly. "We considered spraying hard parts, like the center stack or door handles, with Mystichrome paint. Then I recalled a Ford supplier, Garden State Tanning (GST), had developed leather colored with ChromaFlair pigments." According to Eggly "The paint and interior trim perfectly complement the dramatic style and explosive performance of the SVT Mustang Cobra." Only 1010 Mystichrome Cobras were produced for the 2004 production year with 515 in coupe form and 495 in convertible.

==== Mustang SVO ====
Introduced for the 1984 model year, the SVO was intended to be the model that would both reestablish the Mustang as a modern sports coupe and provide a competitor to European and Japanese compact sports coupes of the day. The project became the first for Ford's then-new SVO division, who endowed the car with several suspension and drive train modifications. Power came from an updated and heavily modified version of Ford's 2.3 L OHC inline four-cylinder engine, featuring a new computer-controlled fuel injection system, and an intercooled turbocharger. Power output for early units was 175 hp (130 kW), very good for the day, giving the vehicle a stout 0–60 mph (97 km/h) time of 7.5 seconds (Car and Driver, October 1983) with the aid of a factory installed Hurst shifter. Updates to late-production cars boosted power ratings to 205 hp (153 kW) and torque to 245 lb⋅ft (332 N⋅m) in mid-year 1985 and was revised to 200 in 1986.

==== Special Service Package (SSP) ====
In 1982, the California Highway Patrol asked Ford to produce a capable and lightweight police car due to the bulkiness of current police cars like the Ford Fairmont and LTD/Crown Victoria. Taking the Fox-Platformed 5.0 Mustangs in production at the time, Ford produced the Ford Mustang SSP (Special Service Package), and modified them to suit the needs of the police and law enforcement departments. Nearly 15,000 of these special units were made from 1982 until their discontinuation in 1993.

==== Spring Feature Edition ====
In 2000, a unique version called "Spring Feature" was available on GT models. Offered only in Performance Red, Black, Silver, White, or Zinc Yellow, the Spring Feature package contained 17 in × 8 in (430 mm × 200 mm) performance wheels and tires, a body-colored hood scoop, body-colored side scoops, two black "GT" stripes on the hood, and black "Mustang" inserts on the embossed bumper. Ford produced 3,091 Spring Feature GTs.

The special edition 2000 Mustang GT called the Spring Feature Mustang; all 3,091 units received the same side ducts and hood scoop as the 35th Anniversary Limited Edition GT, as well as black Mustang bumper inserts, dual black stripes on the hood with GT on them, and 17 in × 8 in (430 mm × 200 mm) bright finish wheels. The 2000 Spring Feature Mustang was the only one offered in Zinc Yellow, a feature that would return to all 2001 Ford Mustangs.

The package was offered in Performance Red, Black, Silver, White, and Zinc Yellow, which appeared only on the Spring Feature cars in 2000 and returned in 2001. The package was available only on GTs and included the following features:

Special 17" X 8" bright machined 5-spoke wheels and performance tires

35th Anniversary body-color hood scoop

35th Anniversary body-color side scoops

Twin black stickers on each side of hood scoop with color-keyed GT lettering

Black "MUSTANG" bumper inserts

Production Totals: ( compare years ) Total VIN VCT Body Sub-Total 214,239 P40 Coupe V6 121,026 P42 Coupe GT 32,321 P44 Convertible V6 41,368 P45 Convertible GT 19,224 P45 Spring Feature Mustang 3,091 P47 Coupe Cobra R 300

==== Bullitt ====
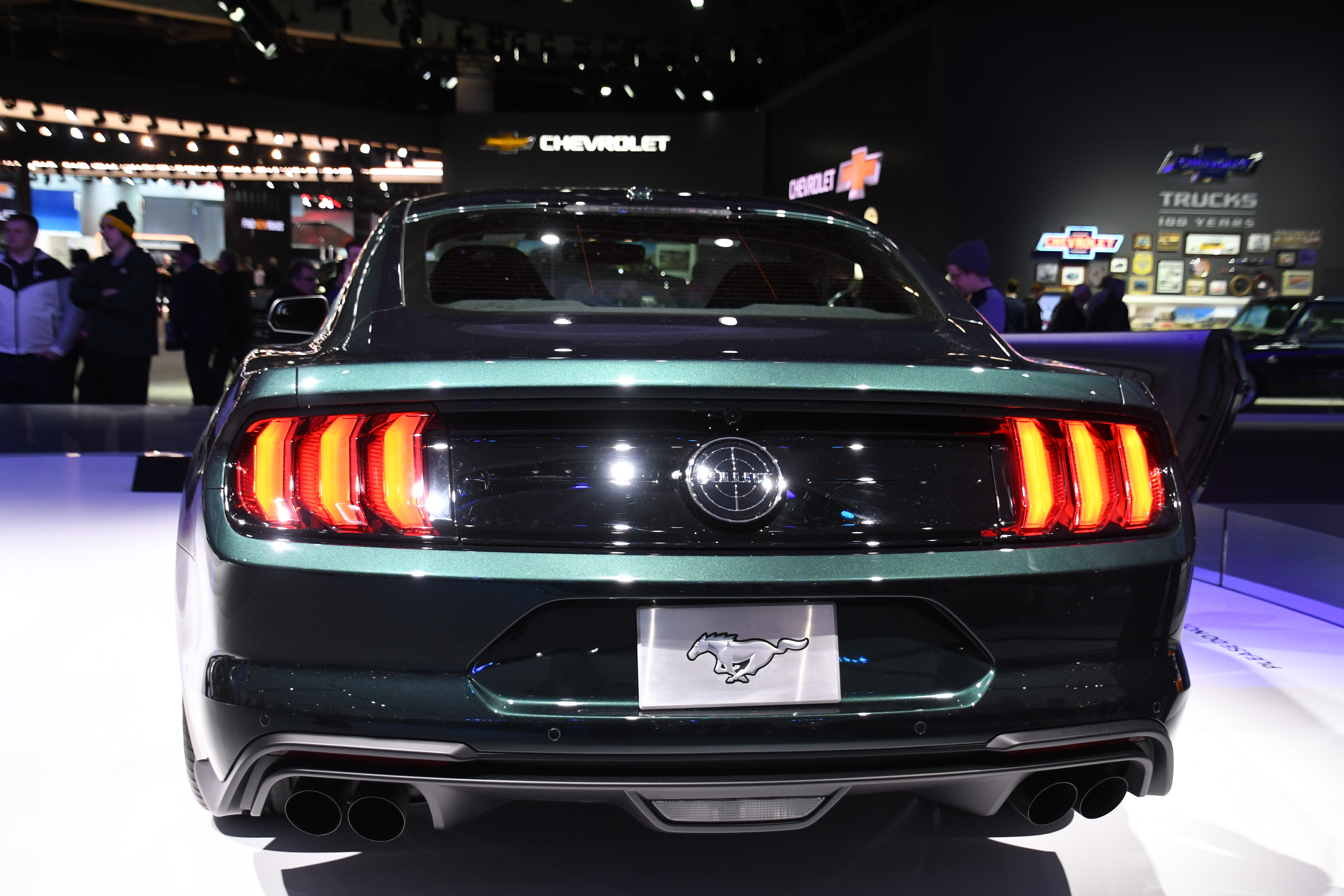
The 2019 Ford Mustang Bullit.

In 2001, Ford partnered with Warner Bros. to offer a special version of its GT with the Bullitt nameplate, honoring the 1968 390 fastback model driven by Steve McQueen in the 1968 movie Bullitt which became famous for its high speed chase scene. The car was designed as a good handler so it was lowered 3/4 of an inch, received Tokico shocks, and short length sub-frame connectors. In addition, a new intake design, high-flow mufflers, and special underdrive pulleys helped increase the power to a conservative 265 hp (198 kW), though many owners report numbers closer to the 270-275 range. More telling is the torque curve, which was vastly improved over the base GT models, 90% of its 305 lb⋅ft (414 N⋅m) available from 2000 rpm. This broader torque curve makes itself known at the drag strip, as these special edition Mustangs could cover the 1/4 mile in 2-3 tenths of a second quicker and about 2 mph (3 km/h) faster than regular GT. 17-inch American Racing Torq-Thrust style rims, wrapped in 245/45ZR performance rubber by Goodyear, were reminiscent of those on the car driven by McQueen in the movie. The Bullitt featured a large hood scoop reminiscent of the earlier Boss 429 scoop, as well as new side scoops, lower body moldings and C-pillars with unique rear side window shape. Other special features on the Bullitt included aluminum pedals and shifter, gauge facings and seat upholstery patterned after the 1968 model, red brake calipers with the Mustang logo on them, and the removal of the spoiler and fog lamps regularly found on Mustang GTs, all for a cleaner look. unique Bullitt badging was added, and the exhaust note was tuned to match the exhaust note from the vehicle in the movie. Braking was also improved with the addition of dual-piston PBR brakes with 13-inch (330 mm) rotors, the same brakes utilized by the 94-04 Mustang Cobra. The vehicles were serialized on tamper-resistant labels in two locations. One was affixed to the drivers side shock tower under the hood, and the other in a hidden location as an "easter egg".

This was a true "skunkworks" style program with Mustang team members essentially volunteering their time in addition to their other responsibilities. It came to be after a show car was produced at Roush Industries for the LA auto show the previous year. The excitement generated by the show car prompted the team to quickly develop a production ready package which it successfully presented a year later at the same LA auto show, where it was announced that it would go into production. Steve McQueen's son Chad, and grandson Chase, were on hand for the announcement.

The Bullitt Mustang was offered in only three colors: Dark Highland Green (the same shade of green used in the famous movie "Bullitt" starring Steve McQueen), Black, and True Blue. Total production was limited to 5,582 units (3,041 Dark Highland Green, 1,819 Black, and 722 True Blue) out of a planned 6500 and sold out prior to production at the Dearborn assembly plant. It was the first of three proposed SN95 feature cars prior to the introduction of the S197 platform. The three feature cars made up the "buzz" cycle plan.

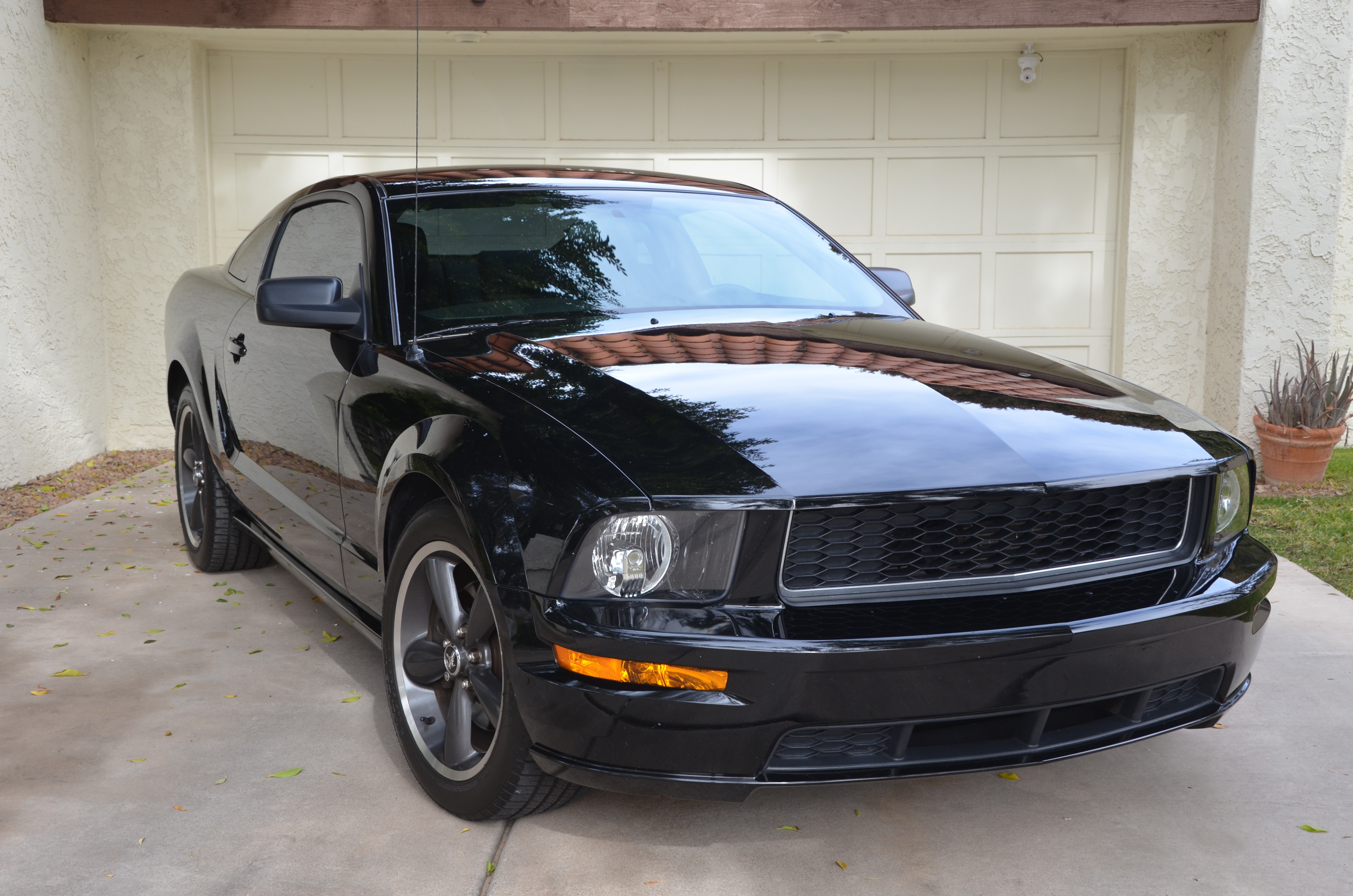
2008 Mustang Bullitt

A 2008–2009 Bullitt edition has been released as well. Exterior features include uniquely finished 18" Torq-Thrust style wheels and removal of the decklid spoiler and all badges except for the faux gas cap, which is replaced with a Bullitt-specific unit. Inside, there are Bullitt door sills, gauges, and steering wheel cap, an engine-turned aluminum dash panel, aluminum shift knob and pedals, and GT500-inspired front seats and GT500-inspired steering wheel with black stitching. The first factory Mustang open-element air filter, unique exhaust that mimics the sound of Steve McQueen's GT 390 Fastback and ends in 3.5-inch tips, and new engine programing raise horsepower to 315 (up from 300). A Tremec 5-speed manual and 3.73:1 ratio live rear axle drops 0-60 mph times to 4.9-5.0 seconds compared to the standard GT's 5.2-5.3, and quarter miles come in 13.8 seconds at 102 mph (164 km/h). Suspension is upgraded with a Bullitt-badged front tower brace and retuned suspension components that drop the ride height by 6 millimetres (0.24 in). The Bullitt package is a $3,310 upgrade from the standard GT Premium.

The Bullitt Mustang returned for the third time for the 2019-2020 model years. It was revealed on stage during the 2018 North American International Auto Show alongside one of the original surviving vehicles from the 1968 film. Molly McQueen, Steve McQueen's granddaughter was the presenter on stage. The s550 variant of the Bullitt was offered in either its signature Dark Highland Green or in Shadow Black paint and had unique exterior features such as: 19" black Torq-Thrust style wheels, spoiler delete, removed badges and a chrome trim along its side windows and front grille. The faux gas cap was back as was the white cue ball style shifter knob. Performance-wise, the Bullitt came equipped with the Gen 3 Coyote V8 but with the intake manifold, throttle body and airbox from the Shelby GT350 that helped the engine to produce an additional 20-horsepower over the GT at 480. The engine was only offered with the MT-82 6-speed manual transmission. Lastly, the active-valve exhaust was tuned to produce a sound more reminiscent of the movie car.

==== Warriors in Pink ====
Beginning in 2007, Ford and ESSENCE have partnered with Susan G. Komen for the Cure to create the Circle of Promise campaign, which aims to increase breast cancer awareness in African-American women. Among the campaign, Ford produced 2500 cars with Warriors in Pink Package. The 2008 Warriors in Pink package is based on V6 Premium Array coupe or convertible, but with a pink ribbon and Pony fender badge, pink Mustang rocker tape striping, charcoal leather seats with pink stitching, an aluminum-spoke steering wheel in leather with pink stitching and charcoal floormats with pink ribbon and contrast stitching.

In addition, there was a sweepstake for winning a custom version of Warriors in Pink vehicle, which was created by Galpin Auto Sports.

For 2009 model year, the production of Warriors in Pink car was reduced to 1000, unveiled at the New York International Auto Show.

==== Mustang Club of America Edition ====
In 2011, Ford introduced the Mustang Club of America edition, code 203, for the V-6 Mustang and convertible. An appearance package, it added special side stripes, a blackout stripe between the tail lights, a billet grille, and metallic sterling grey 18" wheels. The package was only available in Premium V-6 trim, and has been offered since its conception on the V-6 models. The 203 code for the Mustang was the least common for the 2011 model year.

==== Anniversary editions ====
Ford celebrated the Mustang's 20th Anniversary in 1984 by issuing a limited-edition GT model under the designation GT-350. The GT-350 name had not been used since the last Shelby Mustang was produced in 1970. The GT-350 could be ordered in either a hatchback or convertible body style driven by either the high-performance 302cid V8 or the 140cid Turbo four. All came in white with special stripes and lettering while inside, SVO style seats were a feature of the all red interior. The 1984 20th anniversary edition GT sported a whole new look for Mustang, including the white monochromatic paint scheme and bold "GT-350" Striping. These Stripes are very reminiscent of the classic Shelby Mustangs Produced in the 1960s. One big mechanical revision for the Anniversary Mustang involved the GT's suspension. This revision was introduced as a running change early in 1984 to ALL GT Mustangs. The rear control arm pivot points were lowered 1/2-inch on the upper end and 1/4-inch on the lower end for improved suspension geometry. In addition, quad shocks replaced the old-style traction bars and the rear anti-roll bar diameter increased to 0.79 inches (20 mm) compared to 0.67 inches (17 mm) in 1983. Another newcomer in 1984 was the introduction of an Automatic Over Drive (AOD) Transmission. This combination could only be purchased with a 302 utilizing a Throttle Body Fuel Injection (TBI) system, also called Central Fuel Injection(CFI). The optional 165 horsepower (123 kW) 5.0L engine with CFI and the 4-speed AOD transmission package was offered with a 3.27:1 axle ratio. The 175 hp (130 kW) 4V version carried over from 1983 was available only with a T-5 manual transmission. The 4V 5-speed was available with 3.08:1 or 3.27:1 axle ratios. The 20th Anniversary Edition GT350's were produced during 35 days of production. The entire production is believed to have been done in 35 batches starting March 5, 1984 and ending in April 1984, there was one final Anniversary Mustang Convertible (TBI/CFI Automatic) Produced on June 12, 1984.

There was no official 25th Anniversary model from Ford in 1989, even though this was looked into with several designs on body and performance modifications. In response Ford modified the running horse badge on the passenger side of the dash board, stating "25 Years" on the bottom of the badge. These badges were installed beginning in April 1989 for one year, until April 1990, the Anniversary model year. After April 1990, Ford kept the badges in place, without the "25 Years" portion. Ford also added "25 Years" water mark on the window sticker with the running horse badge during this time period.

In 1999, Ford produced a special 35th Anniversary Edition of the Mustang.

In 2003, Ford Produced a Centennial Edition of the Mustang. Producing 1,323 Convertible models and only 717 Coupe models. Total production for this Centennial Edition was 2,040. This model came as Henry Ford stated when he created the Model T "Any color as long as its Black." The 100th Anniversary models only came in black, and included Premium Verona-grain Imola leather seating surfaces in two-tone parchment, and the Mustang got the GT premium package which included 17-inch wheels, anti-lock brakes and traction control; dual exhaust; power driver's seat with power lumbar support; leather-wrapped steering wheel; and Mach 460 AM/FM Stereo with six-disc CD changer, as well as 100th Anniversary badges on the fender and decklid and embossed on the seats. The Centennial Package was a $995 upgrade.

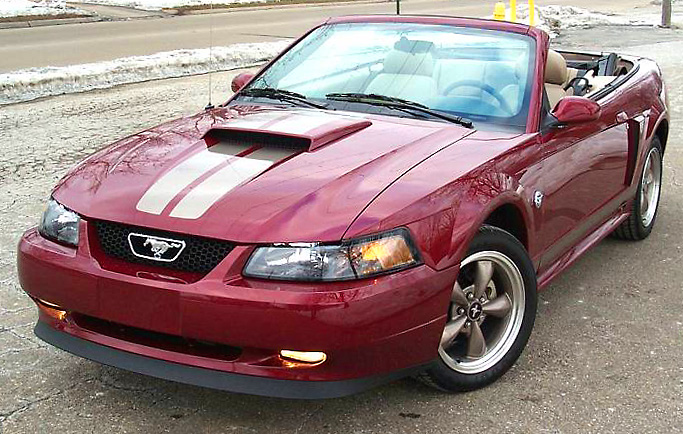
2004 Ford Mustang 40th Anniversary

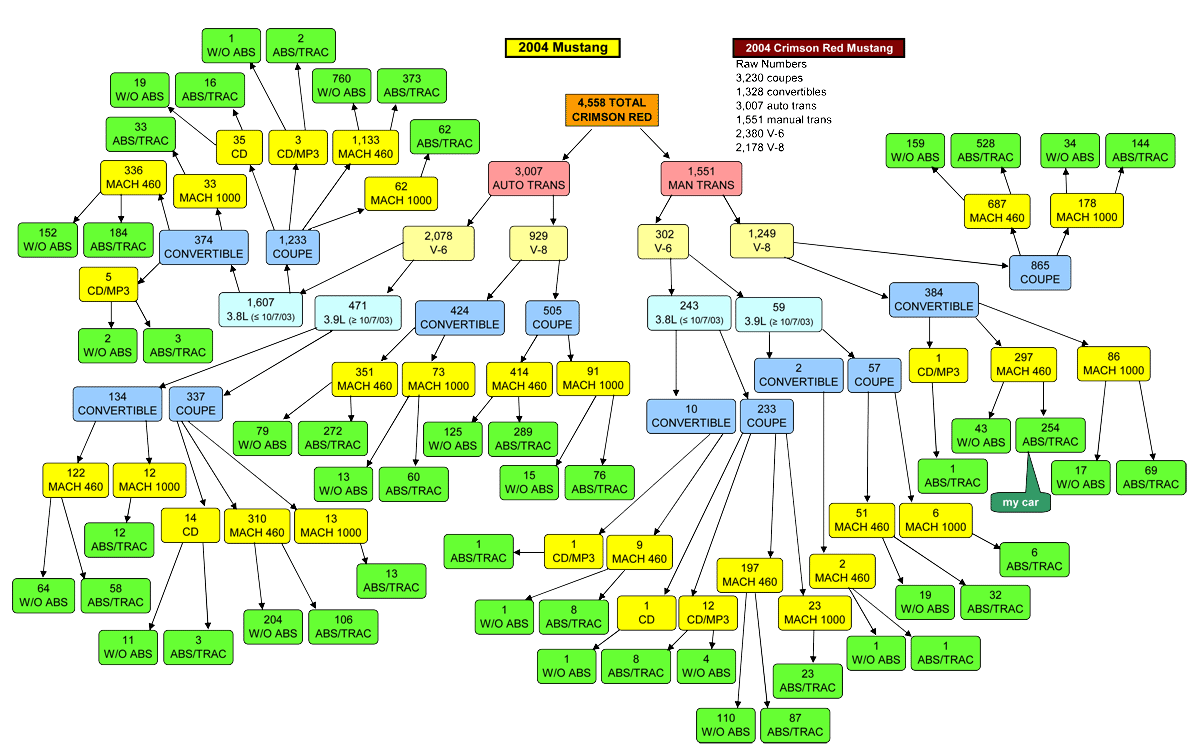
2004 Ford Mustang 40th Anniversary Crimson Red Production Breakdown

In 2004, Ford produced a special 40th Anniversary Edition of the Mustang. As an $895 option available in both Standard and GT editions, coupe or convertible, it consisted of 40th Anniversary badging, enhanced interior with "40th Anniversary" floor mats, painted folding exterior mirrors from the Cobra models, a tan cloth convertible top (instead of canvas), Arizona Beige painted "Bullitt" wheels, and Arizona Beige stripes on the hood, trunk and lower bodysides. The anniversary package was available in Crimson Red (exclusive to package), Oxford White or black. Ford produced 4,558 Crimson Red models. Crimson Red, Ford paint code "FX", was also called Merlot on several other Ford models from the 2002 through 2008 model years. Most 40th Anniversary package cars came with Parchment (tan) leather interiors. Some came with black leather. This is possibly a Canadian variation. This possible Canada-only variation also features 2003 Cobra wheels, no hood stripes and 'Mustang' decals on the lower-body side panels under the doors. Other than two pre-production units, all Crimson Red vehicles were built from August through November 2003. Forty-one of the Crimson Red cars were sent to Roush Industries for conversions into Roush Mustangs. It marked the end of this design of the Mustang, as 2005 ushered in an all-new model.

In 2009, Ford produced a special 45th Anniversary Edition of the Mustang.

In 2014 Ford released a 50th Anniversary Edition.

==== Warrior Mustang (2014-present) ====
2014 saw the introduction of the Warrior Mustang. They were sold exclusively to military personnel serving overseas.

The cars came in 5.0L GT trim packages as well as an Exclusive Warrior Package with a Roush Performance 2.3LTVS Supercharger, which produced 670 horsepower. This Warrior Mustang features Roush-specific designs such as the Roush front fascia, quad-tip rear valence with Roush Quad-Tip exhaust, a rear spoiler, side scoops, and other unique additions. What makes the Warrior Mustang special is the custom Warrior badging and striping which is unique to this car only. They were offered with both an automatic and 6-speed transmission. Color options were Deep Impact Blue, Race Red, Shadow Black, and Silver. Ford added the FP8 appearance package, upgraded Ford Racing Handling Package and Raxiom smoked head and fog lights. Most purchasers didn't see their cars for several months as they chose not to have them shipped overseas.

Specifications

Ford Mustang GT Premium

- 5.0L Ti-VCT V8 engine
- 6-speed SelectShift automatic or manual (optional)
- 400A or 401A Equipment Package
- Shaker Pro™ audio system with 12 speakers
- Voice-activated navigation system with SiriusXM Traffic & Travel Link
- HD radio™
- Memory driver seat (3 settings)
- Mirrors and ambient lighting
- BLIS® (Blind Spot Information System) with cross-traffic alert
- GT Performance Package
- 19" X 19" (F) 19" X 9.5" (R) Ebony Black-painted aluminum wheels
- 255/40R19 (F) 275/40R19 (R) summer only tires
- Brembo™ six-piston front brake calipers with large rotors
- "Engine Turn" aluminum instrument panel
- Gauge Pack (oil pressure and vacuum)
- Heavy-duty front springs
- K-Brace
- Large radiator
- Strut-tower brace
- TORSEN® differential with 3.73 axle ratio
- Unique chassis tuning
- Unique stability control
- EPAS and ABS tuning
- Upsized rear sway bar
- Leather seats

Exclusive Warrior Package:

- ROUSH 2.3LTVS Supercharger (670 Horsepower)
- 545 lb.-ft. of torque
- Extreme-duty half shafts
- ROUSH custom exhaust with quad tips
- ROUSH matte finish hood heat extractors
- Front chin splitter
- Hood scoop body color with white graphic
- Warrior serialized dash plaque
- Warrior fender badge
- Embroidered Warrior headrests
- ROUSH owner manual
- Front fascia with aero pockets
- High flow upper grille with Warrior badge
- High flow lower opening
- Corner pockets outer & inner
- Body side scoop (body color)
- Side rocker aero aids
- Aero rear valance
- Quarter window scoop (coupe only)
- Rear black out panel with ROUSH badging
- Rear decklid spoiler (coupe only)
- ROUSH front windshield banner
- Black ROUSH shift ball (manual only)
- ROUSH Warrior embroidered floor mats
- ROUSH Billet performance pedals
- ROUSH license plaque
- ROUSH engine plaque
- Warrior side graphics package
- Race Red exterior - White stripe with blue accent
- Lightning Blue exterior - White stripe with red accent
- Shadow Black exterior - Red stripe with white accent

Richard Petty Warrior Mustang (2018 only)

These cars were produced in partnership with NASCAR racing legend, Richard Petty, and were only for sale to military personnel. Only eight were built in total, with four made as 2018 year models, and produced 675 horsepower. The cars featured a Petty's Garage grille badge, rear badge, and window etching, Warrior Mustang leather interior, Warrior Mustang embroidered front floor mats, a shift ball in Petty Blue, Edelbrock TVS 2650 supercharger, and was finished in Shadow Black with Petty Blue stripes and detailing. Richard Petty autographed the dash plaque of each vehicle himself.

Golden Warrior Mustang (2002 only) The Golden Warrior is a resto-mod combination of the "Warrior Mustang" and Ford's "Aircraft-Inspired Charity Mustangs". The car was donated to a security officer and disabled Navy veteran by a member of the Jacksonville Sheriff's Office after seeing a touching story on Fox 47 news about him and his dog Sarge being homeless. Upon receiving the vehicle the Naval Aviation veteran immediately noticed that the VIN number of the car coincidently contained many designation numbers and letters of his first command Strike Fighter Squadron 87 (VFA-87) aka the "Golden Warriors", a Navy McDonnell Douglas F/A-18 Hornet fighter jet squadron with which he had deployed with during the Gulf War. The VIN contained coincidences such as beginning with FA for Fighter/Attack, 404 for the GE404 jet engines, and the final two numbers being 87. The command colors of VFA-87 are red and yellow, which matches the original yellow factory paint. Members of VFA-87 restored the Golden Warrior Mustang and gave it an aviation-inspired theme, Golden Warrior command badges, distinctive striping, USA roundel, and other details that match the look of VFA-87 fighter jets. Another Mustang Cobra coincidence is the Northrop YF-17 Cobra was developed into the carrier-capable F/A-18 Hornet for the Navy. The Golden Warrior Mustang is a rare, one-of-a-kind, aircraft-inspired Warrior Mustang built specifically for a disabled US Navy veteran.

=== Race ===
==== FR500 ====
The FR500 name describes racing variants of the Mustang based on the 2005 to 2009 S197 chassis. Ford Racing designed and built "turn-key," competition use cars without VINs (serial numbers were used instead). The FR500S featured a racing version of the 4.6L Ford Modular engine outputting 320 HP (brake / crank) coupled to a Tremec T56R close-ratio 6-speed transmission, while the FR500C featured the 5.0L Cammer R50 engine delivering 420 hp (310 kW), via a Tremec T-56R. FR500 race cars vary greatly depending on what racing series they were designed for. Additionally, different sanctioning bodies have required changes to be made to the FR500 original "spec." For example, an FR500C variant was homologated into the now defunct Grand Am series

Many FR500-based cars are still found competing in all levels of road racing competition, with NASA American Iron, SCCA Touring Class, Trans Am Series, and SCCA World Challenge Pro Racing.

=== Aviation-themed ===
Since 2000, Ford has been the exclusive automotive partner of EAA AirVenture Oshkosh, the world's largest annual airshow. Since 2008, Ford design and engineering teams have produced one-of-a-kind aviation-themed Mustangs to be auctioned off during the Gathering of Eagles, with proceeds benefiting the EAA Young Eagles organization. These Mustangs feature specialized graphics and appearance packages, as well as performance modifications.

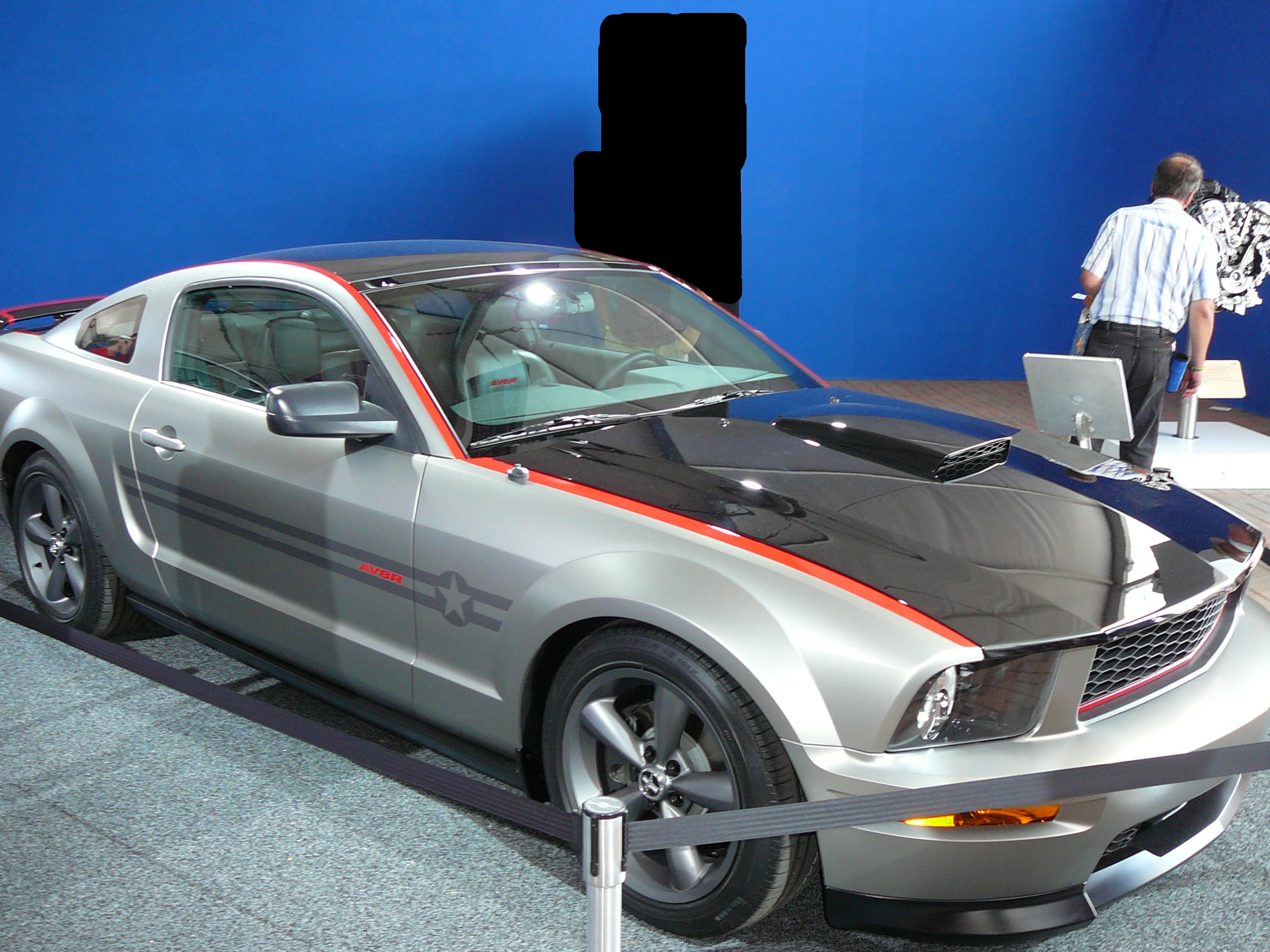
The Ford Mustang AV8R at the 2008 EAA AirVenture Oshkosh Airshow

AV8R
based on the P-51 Mustang aircraft; auctioned in 2008 for $500,000

AV-X10 "Dearborn Doll"
inspired by WWII-era fighter planes; fetched $250,000 at auction in 2009

SR-71 Blackbird
inspired by the Lockheed jet of the same name; auctioned for $375,000 in 2010

Blue Angels
blue chrome-finished Mustang, named for the Blue Angels jet squad; auctioned for $400,000 in 2011

Red Tails
released in 2012, honoring the group of World War II pilots known as the Tuskegee Airmen; auctioned for $370,000

Thunderbirds
inspired by the U.S. Air Force Thunderbirds; sold at auction for $398,000 in 2013

F-35 Lightning II
inspired by the Lockheed Martin jet of the same name; auctioned for $200,000 for the EAA Young Eagles Foundation in 2014

Apollo 13
a 627 HP Mustang which paid tribute to the Apollo 13 NASA mission; sold at EAA auction for $230,000 in 2015

Ole Yeller
a 2016 GT350 inspired by Bob Hoover's P-51 Mustang aircraft "Ole Yeller"; sold for $295,000 for the EAA Young Eagles Foundation

== Third party ==
=== Shelby Mustangs ===
Automobile racer Carroll Shelby transformed a conventional Mustang into a serious track racer designated as the "GT-350". Additionally, shortened hoods and deleted rear seats with identifying trim were among the visual variations. These select Mustangs were converted to street, road racing, and drag cars in Shelby's plant at Los Angeles International Airport.

==== Shelby GT-H ====
The 2006 GT-H was built as a 40th anniversary Hertz rental model as a tribute to the GT350-H in 1966. The GT-H was an exclusive Shelby styled GT that was also used as a concept for the planned Shelby GTs, released in the summer of 2007. After the success of the 2006 Shelby GT-H coupe, a 2007 GT-H convertible was released, 500 were produced.

==== Shelby GT500KR ====
In 1968, Ford offered a special edition of the Shelby Mustang, called the GT500KR, which stood for King of the Road. It had the 428 c.i. Cobra Jet engine introduced the same year. In early 2007, Shelby had announced that they would release a new GT500KR based on S-197 Mustangs for the 2009 model year. The package was only available through Shelby for all 05+ S-197 based GT500's. The K.I.T.T. in the Knight Rider 2008 television pilot movie is a modified black Shelby GT500KR Mustang.

==== Shelby CS6/8 ====
After 35 years, in 2005 Carroll Shelby built his first Ford Shelby Masterpiece CSM No. 00001, CS6 V6, putting out 380 hp. Ford renewed their contract with Shelby. Shelby along with Paxton also designed a new variant based on the V6 Mustang. Modifications include a supercharged motor producing 350 hp (260 kW). 20" wheels bearing the Shelby name and the Cobra moniker on each side and the decklid. The 2" drop in suspension, Baer/Shelby 14-inch front and rear brakes and aggressive front fascia along with a dual exhaust. Shelby also created the CS8, a 4.6-liter V8 variant of the CS6. The Shelby CS6/8 was not available as a factory release, however Shelby had made the CS6/8 kit available for purchase online for a very short period of time, only a handful were sold, making it one of the rarest Shelbys in the world.

==== Shelby GT500E ====
Due to the popularity of the remake Gone in 60 Seconds movie of 2000 and the popularity of Eleanor, a number of car shops started to produce the copyrighted character Eleanor and Denice Shakarian Halicki again had to resort to legal action to protect the trademark and Eleanor's copyrighted character image. In 2008, Denice won a case against Carroll Shelby, who had been selling "Eleanor". In 2008 the appeal court stated that Eleanor is a copyrighted character and that includes her image, the one-of-a-kind custom looks.

=== Roush ===
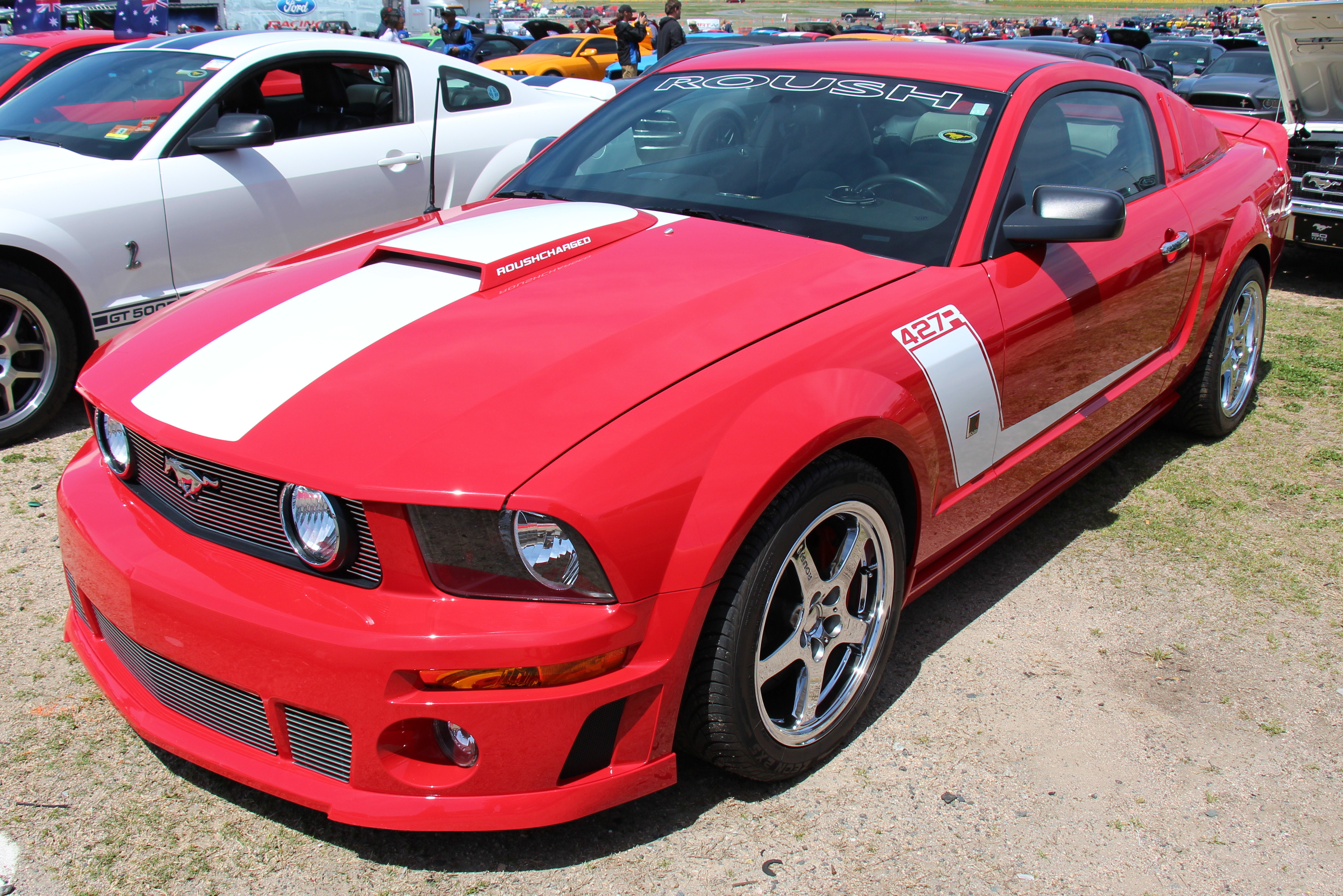
2007 Roush Mustang 427R

The Jack Roush Performance Engineering, established by former Ford engineer Jack Roush in 1976, had been known for providing performance racing parts, vehicles and engines. In 1988, Roush pitched Ford on his first high performance Mustang variations, a 400 hp twin turbocharged model. Roush had hoped to form a partnership with Ford which would put his Mustangs in dealer showrooms across the country. Unfortunately, Ford passed on this collaboration noting the vehicles would be too expensive to mass-produce.

From 1995 to 2003, Roush Performance Products was formed offering aftermarket performance parts, vehicles and crate engines for street use. The company introduced four packages for the Mustang. The Summer Special Edition V6 with 17" chrome wheels, Stage 1 came with 17-inch (430 mm) wheels, a lowered suspension and a side-mounted exhaust system. In addition, it came with an air dam, side skirts and a rear spoiler. Stage 2 was an upgraded Stage 1 with 18-inch (460 mm) alloy wheels and BFGoodrich Comp T/A tires. The suspension was extensively modified with Bilstein shocks, high-rate springs, stiffer anti-roll bars and new control arms. Roush claimed it achieved 1.0g lateral acceleration and was on par with the Porsche 911 Turbo. Both Stage 1 and Stage 2 came with V6 or V8 engine options. The top of the line was the Stage 3, with 360 hp (268 kW) and 375 ft·lbf (508 Nm) of torque. The Stage 3 platform was essentially a heavily modified Mustang GT. The Ford 4.6L V8 was upgraded with an Eaton supercharger, a new intake manifold, high performing fuel injectors, an air-to-water intercooler and a lighter flywheel (on the manual transmission only). The Stage 3 was available in three packages: Sport, Rally and Premium. Note: (The Sport has the same variations as The Premium stage 3 but without the supercharger which can be added at a later date by customer.)

In 2004, Roush released a limited edition mustang known as the 440A. This was a Stage 3 Roush with the addition of a custom 440A interior, Roush braking system, and a rear exhaust system instead of the side-mounted exhaust system. The 440A model was released in 2004 to commemorate the 40 years of Ford Mustang production. Only 40 Roush 440A Mustangs were produced and all were sold at Brandon Ford dealership in Tampa Florida. Roush also claimed that this model produced 400 hp (300 kW), a claim that has been argued by some who claim that the engine was dyno tested at 360 hp (268 kW).

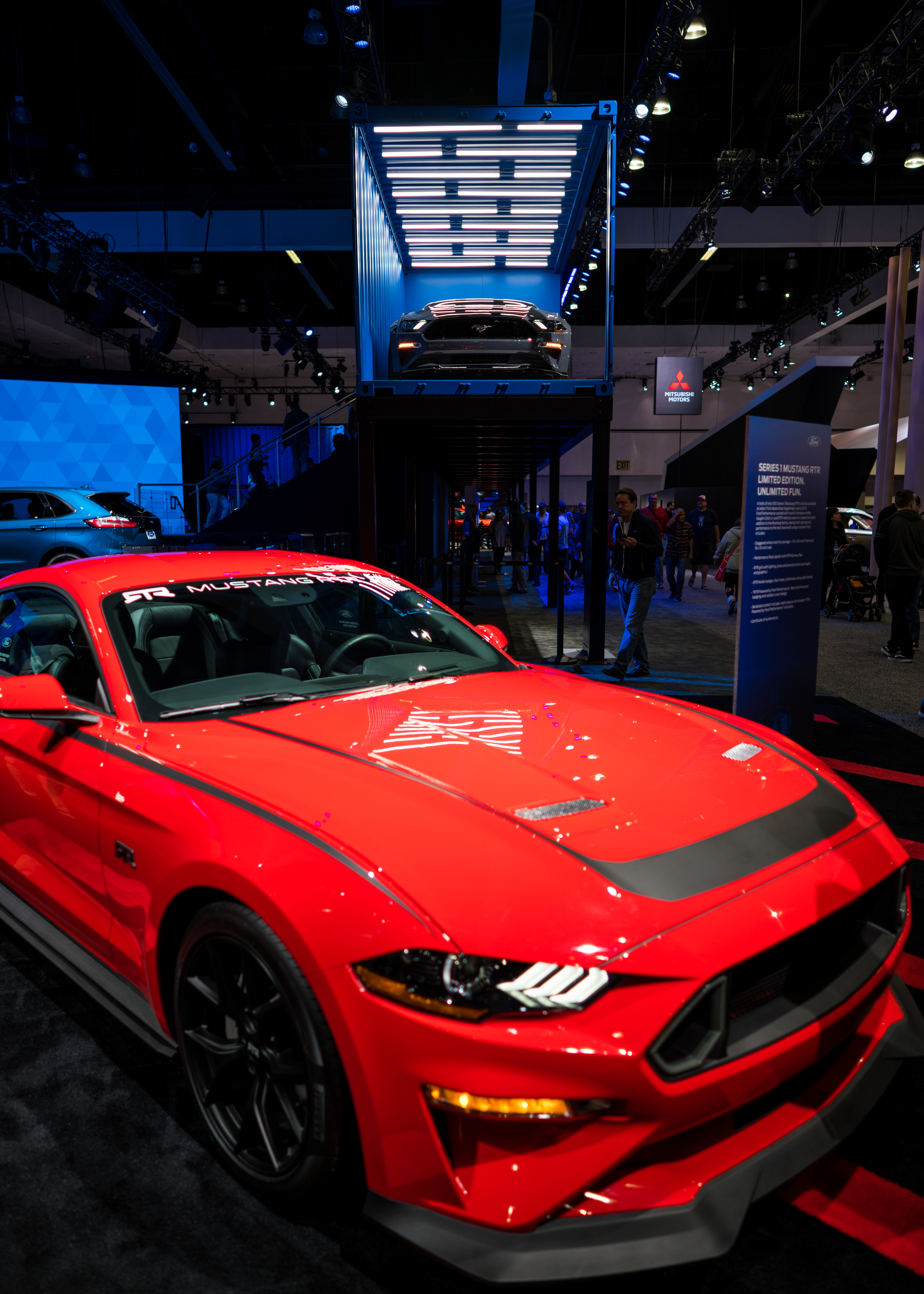
The 2018 Ford Mustang with Rousch Package.

In 2005, based on the S-197 Mustang, Roush introduced the Sport, Stage 1, Stage 2, and Stage 3 editions. The lowest-level version was the Roush Sport package. The Roush Sport Mustang had a 1960s retro look. It featured a six-piece Aerobody kit of Roush-designed aerodynamic body components. The kit included rocker panels, a rear wing, front fascia and rear valances. Optional body components were a chin spoiler, quarter window and rear louvers, and a hood scoop. The Stage 1 Roush Mustang was an appearance package, offering many of the aesthetic components of the Sport version. It featured Roush graphics, fender badges, deck lid emblem, windshield banner and embroidered floor mats. Stage 1 options included leather seats, Jack Roush-autographed gauge cluster, and billeted aluminum pedals and shift knob. Stage 2 was the more popular version, with performance suspension and handling components combined with appearance upgrades. It included racing-style front struts, rear shocks, front and rear springs, and a front sway bar. Custom Roush 18-inch chrome wheels and high-performance tires were part of the package. The Stage 3 came with 18 in (460 mm), forged chrome wheels and high-performance tires, and 14-inch (360 mm) rotors with four-piston Stop-Tech produced calipers, in addition to numerous "Stage 3" plaques, custom embroidered leather upholstery, and a custom dash instrument cluster. The Eaton M90 supercharged 4.6L V8 now had an output of 415 hp (268.4 kW) and 385 ft·lb (521 Nm) of torque with a Roush supercharger and an air-to-water intercooler. The top of the line was the Stage 3 Mustang, but Roush recognized that many buyers did not want all the features (particularly cosmetic) that the Stage 3 offered, so beginning in 2007, Roush introduced the 427R. The 427R featured the same suspension, power-train, and most of the body-kit of the Stage 3, but it lacked the rear fascia and rectangular exhaust tips of the various Stage models. It produced an additional 20 hp (14.91 kW) and 15 ft⋅lbf (20 N⋅m) of torque over the Stage 3 Mustang, due to an upgraded ECM (electronic control module). In addition, it was equipped with a "hockey stick stripe" appearance package in lieu of the two racing stripes found on the Sport through Stage 3 models. In 2008, Roush produced the limited edition 428R Mustang (followed by the limited edition 429R Mustang in 2009), which was the same concept as the previous year's 427R, but featured a horizontal nine-bar grille, Sparco captive hood pins, and a chrome supercharger. Four and six-piston brakes were an option on both cars, but not standard. Also, in 2007 and 2008, Roush produced 100 per year of the all-black Blackjack Mustang, and the top shelf P-51A and P-51B mustangs. These cars featured a Vapor Silver / green paint scheme, accented with Satin Silver hood scoop, chin spoiler and rear wing (in a tribute to the P-51 Mustang fighter plane of WW-II). The engine internals were upgraded to a forged rotating assembly, allowing a larger Eaton TVS R2300 Roots supercharger. This produced 510 crank hp and 510 ft lbs of torque. The difference between the A and B models is the belt drive for the supercharger - the A series uses a single belt, the B series uses a dual-belt system Front-End Accessory Drive (FEAD). Other Roush cars produced in this era were the 2008-only Roush 427R TrakPak, with upgraded suspension components, forged wheels and large APC carbon fiber wing; Roush Drag-Pak Mustangs; and various one-offs for Cooper Tires and certain dealers of Roush products.

=== Steeda ===
Based in Pompano Beach, Florida, Dario Orlando founded Steeda Autosports (now known as Steeda) in 1988 using his years of experience repairing and racing cars. Steeda is one of the largest manufacturers of Ford aftermarket performance parts.

Originally a simple Ford-based racing team, they introduced its Steeda GT in 1998. The Steeda GT was a low-production car with mostly handling and braking upgrades, including Steeda Ultralite. A cold-air kit, underdrive pulleys, rear wing, Sidewinder custom side stripes, and some minor computer tuning added slightly over $5,500 to the price of a standard Mustang GT.

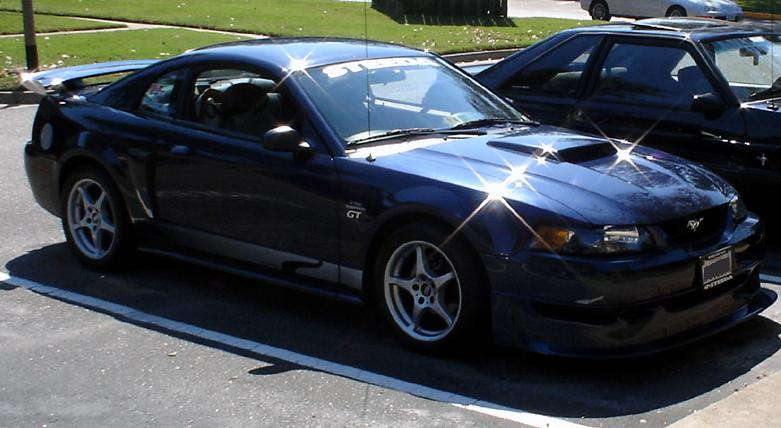
2002 Steeda Mustang GT

In 2000, prior to the introduction of the Q400, the Steeda GT was given the front splitter, which helped keep the newer New Edge Mustangs planted on the ground, and became a popular aftermarket addition. This remained the only offering from Steeda through the 2002 model year.

In 2003 Steeda introduced the Q400, based on the Mustang GT with an advertised 400 hp (298 kW). The 4.6L V8 in the Q400 was modified with a Vortech (or Paxton) centrifugal supercharger, K&N Filter, Ford Racing Performance Parts (FRPP) 70 mm (2.8 in) throttle body, and an HD aluminum radiator. Fuel is supplied via twin Bosch pumps, and Steeda-spec Borla 2.5 in (64 mm) stainless pipes and mufflers. Motor Trend magazine performed a dynamometer test on the Q400. Their Q400 had produced 425 hp (317 kW) from the rear wheels, and 450 hp (335 kW) from the flywheel.

In 2006, Steeda introduced Q525. It comes equipped with a 5.0L Modular V8, producing 500 hp (373 kW) and 530 ft·lbf (719 Nm) of torque, thanks to a Steeda/MagnaCharger supercharger system with an intercooler, a 62 mm (2.4 in) twin-bore throttle body, a Steeda/SCT air meter, 60 lb (27 kg) electronic fuel injectors and a Steeda Intake Kit.

=== Saleen ===
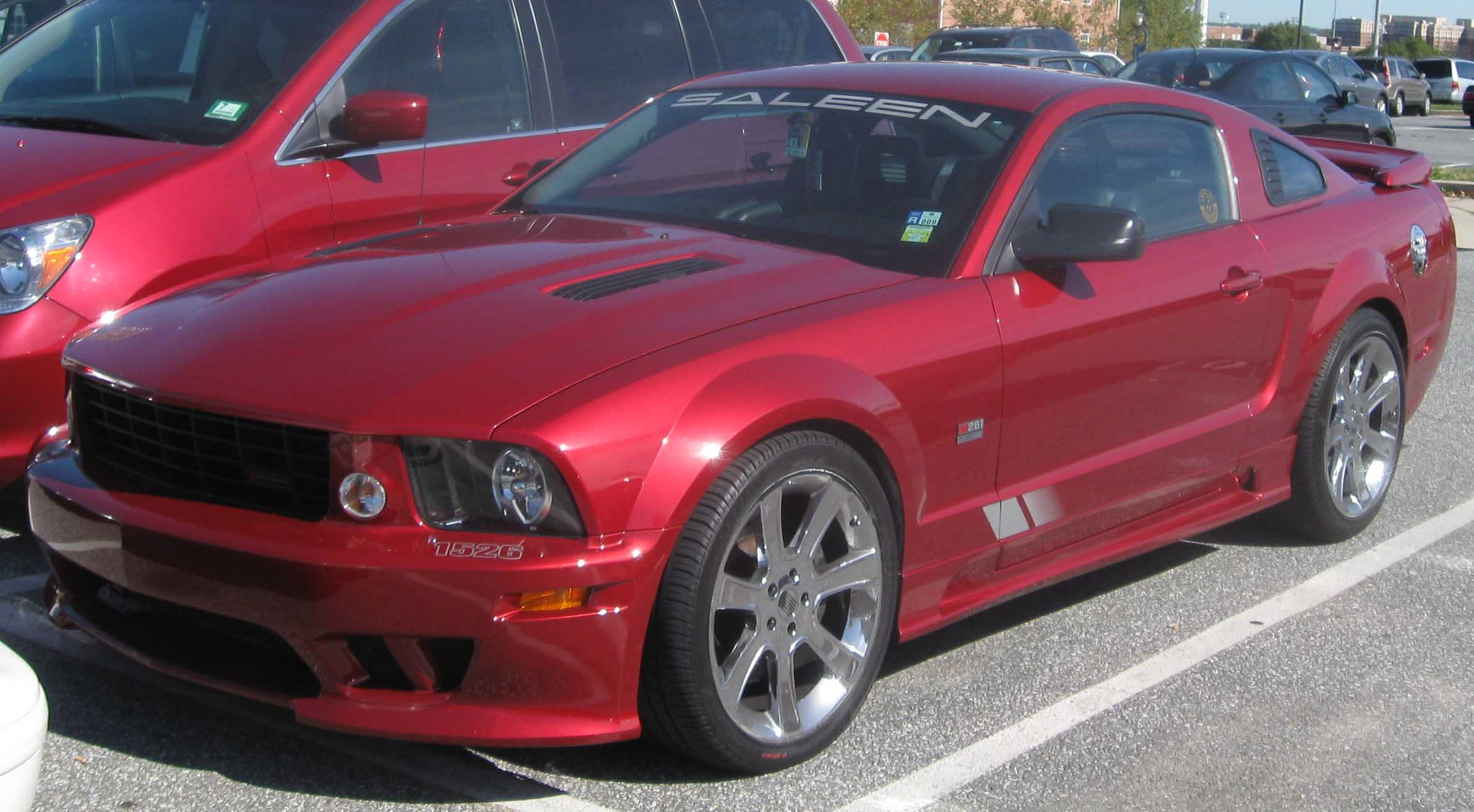
Saleen S281 Mustang

Saleen was founded by racer Steve Saleen in 1983, the first model being produced in 1984. The first Saleens were mainly focused on handling performance and used stock Ford engines. Races Saleen has won with his Mustangs include the 24 hours races of Le Mans and Daytona, as well as many SCCA championships. Saleen Mustangs came in two main categories—the S281, which had the Ford Modular 4.6L 281CI V-8, and the S351, which had a 351ci 5.8L Windsor V-8 installed. There were supercharged versions of both. The "S351 was available from 1994 to 1999. For the Mustangs 5th generation the top Saleen model was the S302-Extreme, in which they have replaced the factory 4.6-liter with a Saleen-built V8 engine, increasing the power to almost 620 hp.

In 2007, Saleen and retired racer Parnelli Jones made a limited-edition version of the Mustang. Though often called the Saleen/Parnelli Jones S302, it was designed to pay homage to the legendary Boss 302 that Jones raced back in the 1970s. Equipped with a Saleen MOD 302 cid 3-valve V8, the S302 makes 400 hp (298 kW) and 390 lb⋅ft (529 N⋅m) of torque. Production of this car was limited to 500 cars.

=== Gaffoglio Family Metalcrafters ===
==== Iacocca Silver 45th Anniversary Edition (2009) ====
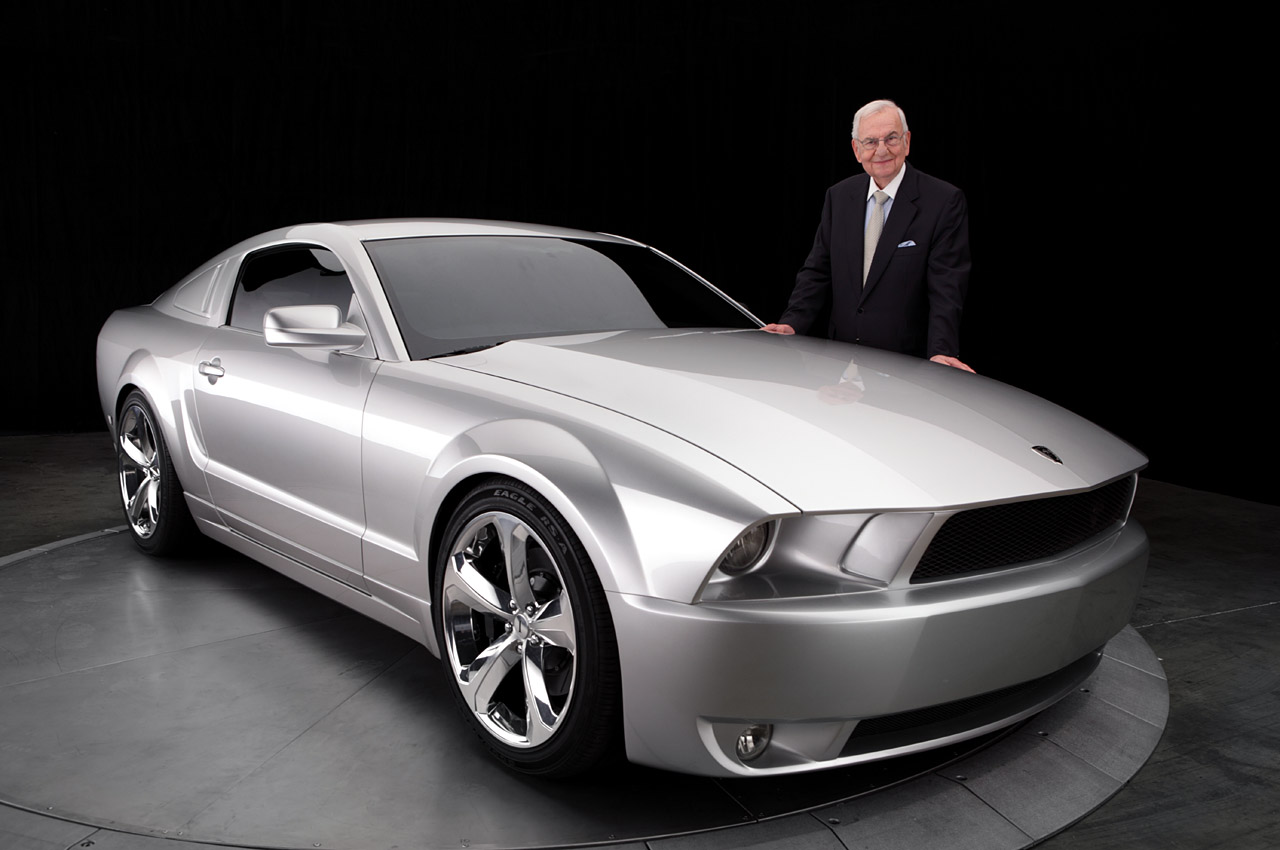
2009½ Iacocca Mustang

The Iacocca Silver 45th Anniversary Edition is a limited (45 unit) edition commemorating the 45th anniversary of the Ford Mustang. Named for Lee Iacocca, who helped develop and introduce the Mustang, this edition is based on the 2009 Mustang platform. It was created and designed by Michael Leone (I Legacy and Michael Leone Design) and built by California-based Gaffoglio Family Metalcrafters coachbuilding company. Despite the build status, it carries factory engine and Ford Racing Package warranties. Iacocca was given car 1 of 45. Another was sold for $352,000 at auction.

Engine choices include a 4.6L Ford V8 rated at 320 hp (239 kW), or an optional supercharged version rated at 400 hp (298 kW). The only available transmission is a 5-speed manual. The car's suspension was upgraded from the base car. Ford Racing Handling Pack adds firmer springs and re-valved shock absorbers; optional are 14-inch (360 mm) brakes.

==== Mustang GTD ====
On August 17, 2023, Ford unveiled the 2025 Mustang GTD (Grand Touring Daytona), a high-performance version of the Mustang designed and engineered by Ford Performance and Multimatic. It is equipped with a 5.2 litre supercharged V8 engine, active aerodynamics, and a number of track oriented modifications. The GTD is stated to have a redline of over 7500rpm and 800 horsepower. It will be available in very limited numbers with a $300,000 price tag. The Mustang is assembled at the Flat Rock Plant, then is shipped to Multimatic's factory in Ontario for modification.

== See also ==
- Ford Mustang GT3
