= Roy Lunn =

American engineer (1925–2017)

- Born: 26 June 1925; Richmond, London
- Died: 5 August 2017 (aged 92); Santa Barbara, California
- Occupation: Automotive engineer
- Years active: 1946–1987
- Employers: Ford Motor Company; American Motors Corporation
- Notable work: Ford Mustang I; AMC Eagle; Jeep Cherokee (XJ); AMC Straight-4 engine
- Awards: Society of Automotive Engineers Fellow; Inducted into the Automotive Hall of Fame in 2016

Royston Charles Lunn (26 June 1925 – 5 August 2017) was an engineer in the automotive industry. He had forty-one years in the design development and production of vehicles and most notably served as the head of engineering at American Motors Corporation (AMC) from 1971 to 1987. Lunn is credited as being the "father of the modern SUV" and "the godfather of the Ford GT40".

== Early life ==
Roy Lunn was educated in England with degrees in mechanical and aeronautical engineering. Lunn was in the Royal Air Force for two years as a pilot. Trained as a jig and a toolmaker and designer, he entered the auto industry in 1946 when AC Cars hired Lunn as a designer. After one year, he moved to Aston Martin as the assistant chief designer and was responsible for the DB2 program. He joined Jowett in 1949 as chief designer and was involved in a variety of projects, including the first plastic-bodied car. Lunn also participated in automobile races. He was the co-driver with Marcel Becquart, winning the 1952 RAC International Rally.

== Ford Motor Company ==
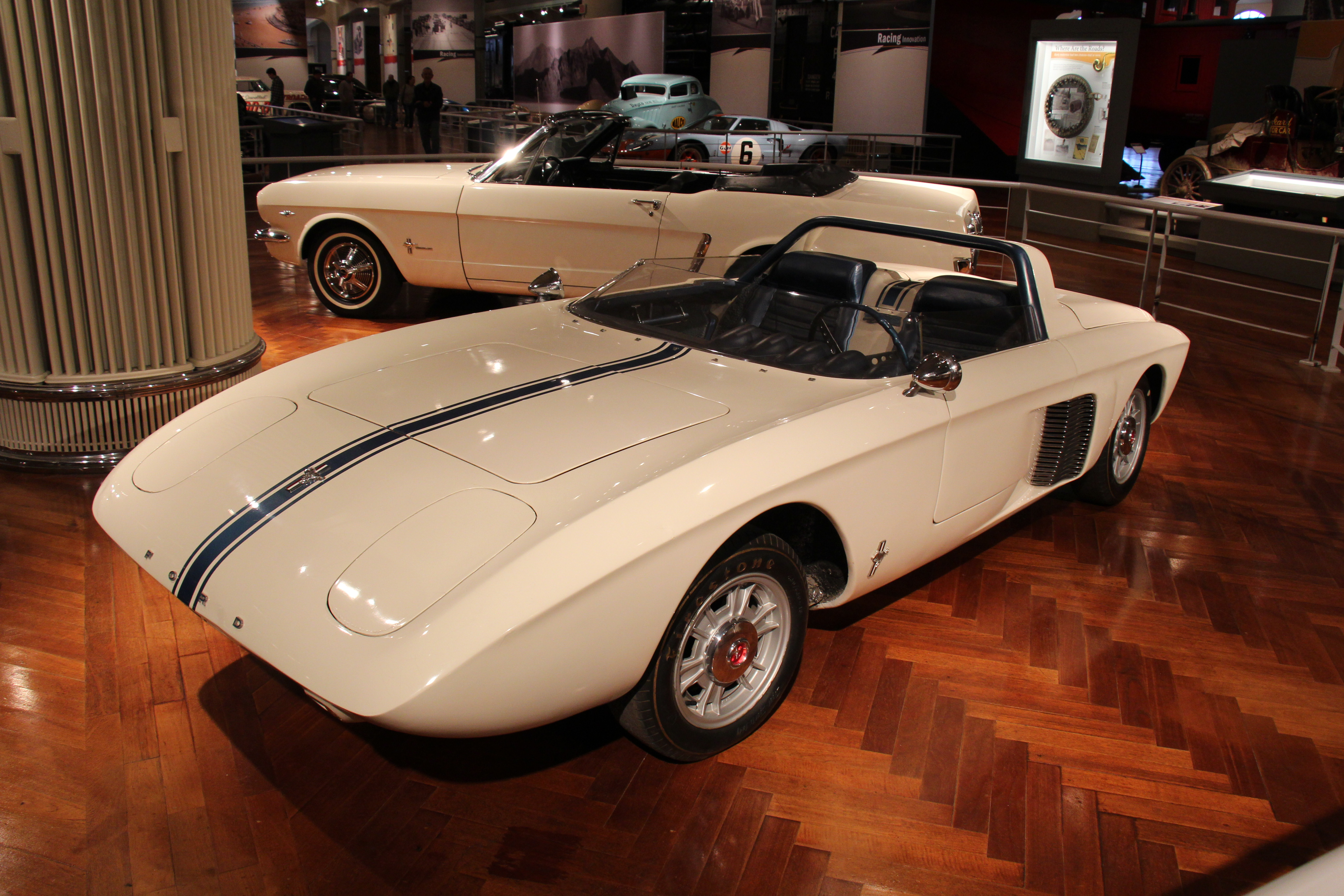
Ford Mustang I Roadster

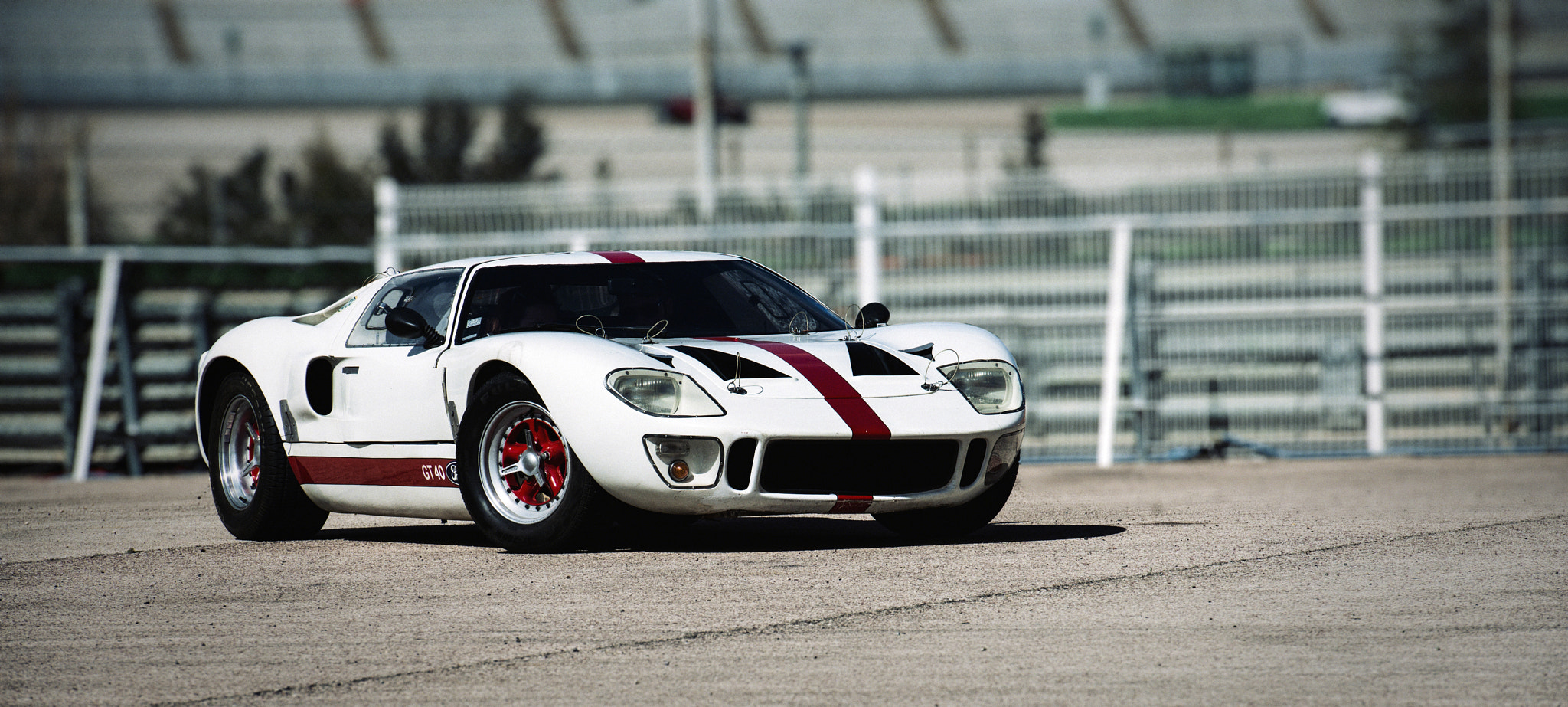
Ford GT 40

In 1953, Lunn joined Ford Motor Company in England and was assigned the task of starting a new Research Center in Birmingham. This center made the first prototype of what became the 105-E Anglia. Lunn transferred to the Ford plant in Dagenham as the car's product planning manager to follow the 105-E into mass production.

He emigrated to the United States in 1958 and became manager of the Ford Advanced Vehicle center. He participated in the development of a 170,000-pound (77,111 kg) gross vehicle weight rating highway truck, as well as the Cardinal, Ford's first front-wheel drive automobile that became the 15-M Taunus.

In 1962, Lunn became a U.S. citizen. In 1962, Lunn and his team of engineers developed a two-seat Ford Mustang I prototype in just 100 days. He was also put on a special assignment to design and develop a GT racing car along with Ray Geddes and Donald N. Frey. Ford's CEO, Henry Ford II, conceived this racing program after his attempt to purchase Ferrari collapsed. In 1963, under the direction of Lunn, work began on an all-new racecar, loosely based on the Lola GT. In April 1964, the Ford GT40 was presented to the press for the first time.

As the pony car wars continued, "Bunkie" Knudsen ordered Ford's large 429 cu in (7.0 L) Cobra Jet V8 into the 1969 Ford Mustang's engine bay. Lunn was charged to build the "ultimate Mustang" and worked with Kar Kraft, the Brighton, Michigan, specialty shop that built many of Ford's racing cars at the time, to produce the Boss 429.

== American Motors ==
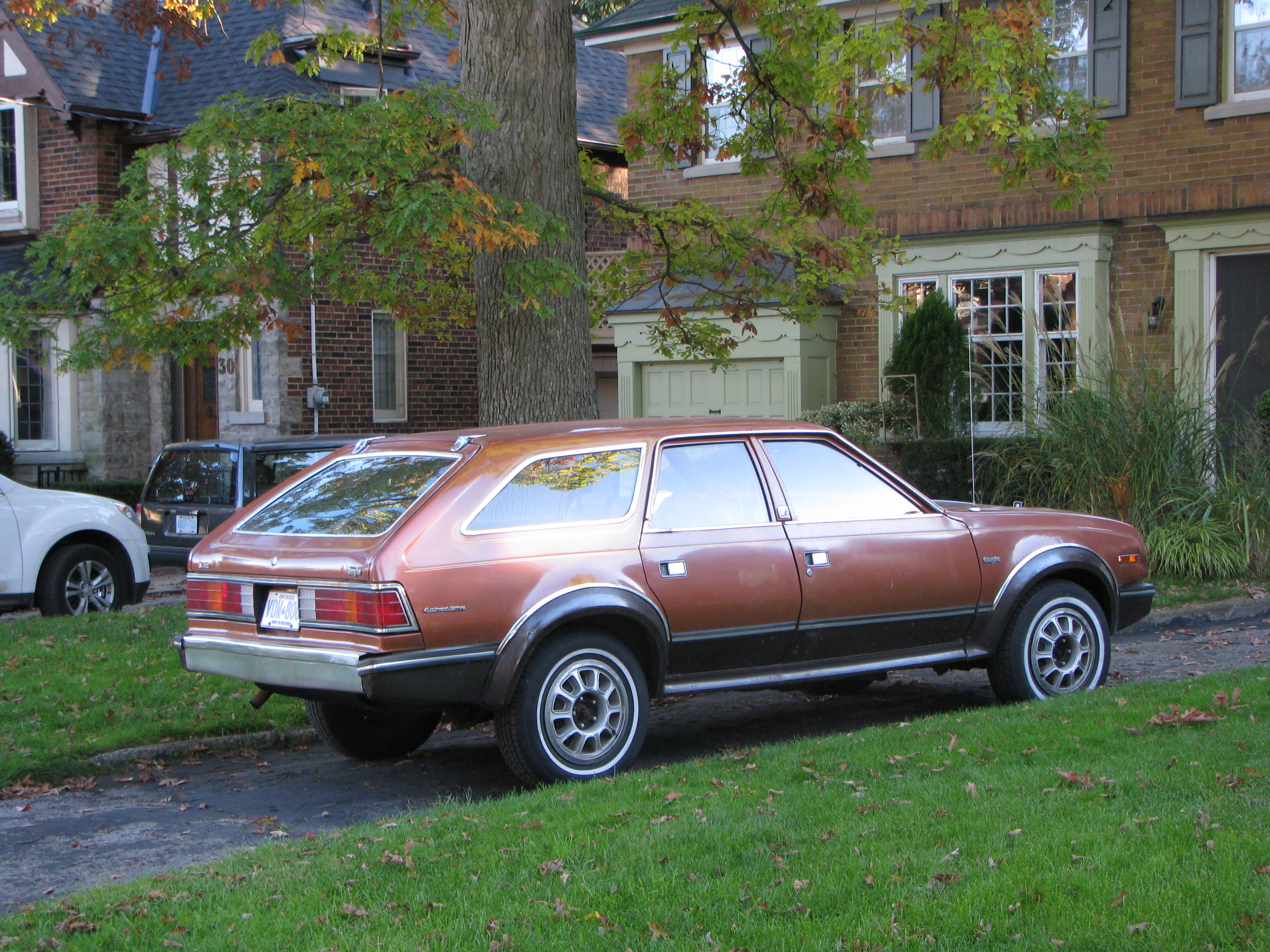
AMC Eagle Wagon

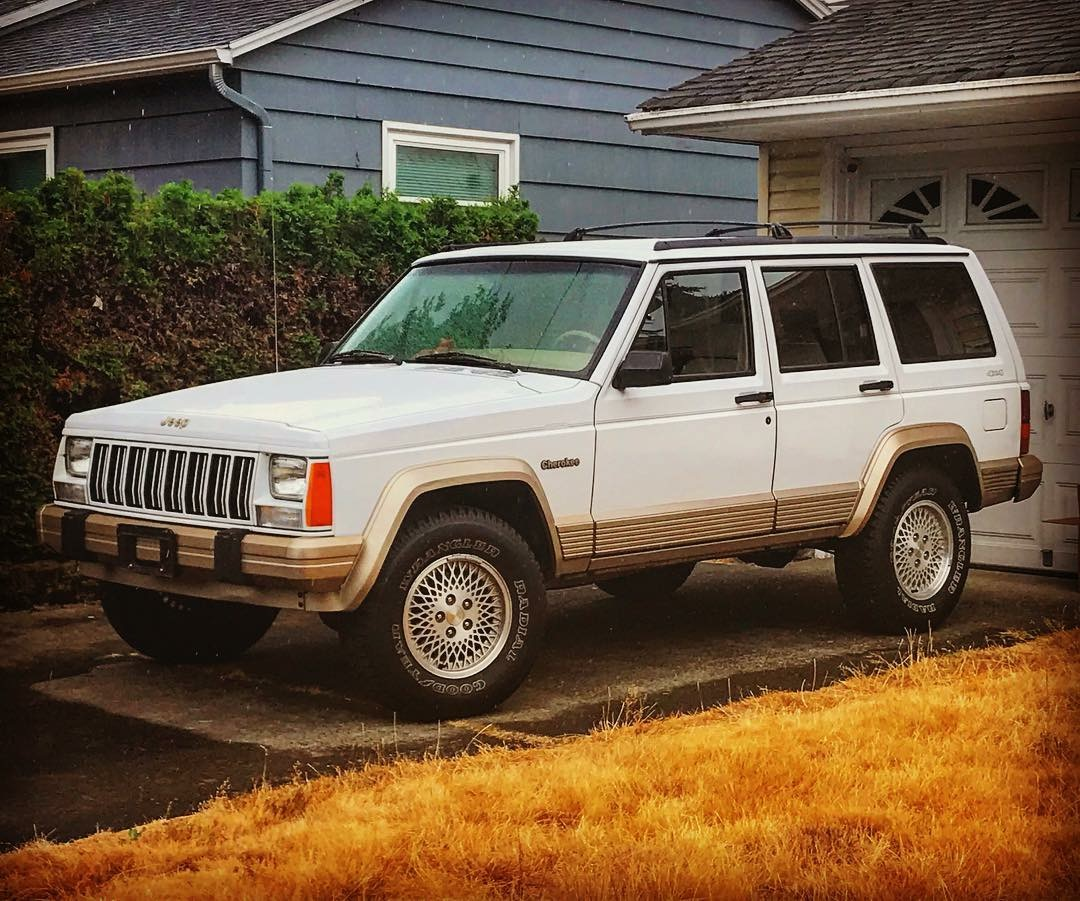
Jeep Cherokee (XJ)

Lunn joined American Motors in 1971 as the director of engineering for Jeep, which had recently been purchased by AMC from Kaiser. Lunn quickly advanced at AMC to the position of Vice President of Engineering. His notable accomplishments include the AMC Eagle, the compact Jeep Cherokee (XJ), which was the first of the modern range of SUV vehicles, as well as the development of the AMC Straight-4 engine and the Jeep 4.0-liter engine that were based on the "modern era" AMC Straight-6 engine.

As Jeep's chief engineer, Lunn orchestrated 4WD's next leap ahead when he joined the AMC Concord body with a reconstituted Jeep driveline. According to former AMC chairman, Gerald C. Meyers, "our initial reaction to Lunn's concoction was, 'What the hell is it?' The body was raised an extra four inches for transfer-case clearance and the wheel wells were wide open." This became the AMC Eagle, an integration and application of AMC and Jeep engineering technologies, which was America's first four-wheel drive car.

Lunn was also active in the Society of Automotive Engineers (SAE International) becoming their technical committee chairman in 1983. He was elected a Fellow of the Society in 1985.

He completed his career at American Motors by forming and becoming President of Renault Jeep Sport to centralize all AMC and Renault racing activities in the U.S.

Lunn also designed and put into production a low-cost racing car for the Sports Car Club of America (SCCA), of which more than 864 Sports Renault purpose-built race cars (later: Spec Racer Ford) have been built.

Lunn developed a groundbreaking design for a compact-sized SUV. It featured a steel ladder frame welded to a unitized body and included a four-door version. Because AMC lacked the resources to conduct the lengthy durability tests before the late 1983 introduction of the Cherokee XJ, Lunn headed the first American entry to drive the Paris-Dakar rally. The objective of his team was "not to compete but simply to run the brutal desert course" with two new Cherokees and monitor how they would survive the punishing 6,200 mi (9,978 km) racecourse. Lunn's design "became the template for the modern SUV and continues to be copied by virtually all major global automakers."

He retired in 1985 and was immediately called back to become vice president of engineering for the AM General division of AMC. The High Mobility Multipurpose Wheeled Vehicle military Jeep (Hummer) was going into production and Lunn was charged with overseeing the corrective actions to achieve acceptance by the U.S. Army.

== Retirement ==
Lunn retired to his home in Florida in 1987 where he continued to work on various projects. He relocated to Santa Barbara, California, in 2015 and served as a mentor to students in the mechanical engineering program at the University of California, Santa Barbara. Lunn suffered a stroke in late July and died of its complications on 5 August 2017.
