= Donald N. Frey =

American automotive engineer (1923–2010)

- Born: Donald Nelson Frey; March 23, 1923; St. Louis, Missouri
- Died: March 5, 2010 (aged 86); Evanston, Illinois
- Education: University of Michigan
- Engineering career
- Projects: automotive engineering, manufacturing, information systems
- Awards: National Medal of Technology

External image
- Donald Frey, celebrating the 40th Anniversary of the Mustang, 2004

Donald Nelson Frey (pronounced Frī ) (March 23, 1923 – March 5, 2010), was widely known as the Ford Motor Company product manager who, along with Lee Iacocca and others, developed the Ford Mustang into a viable project — and who ultimately supervised the development of the car in a record 18 months.

At times besieged by autograph seekers for his role with the Mustang, Frey, a third generation engineer, was "one of the few auto executives with experience in all three of the industry's essential areas: design, manufacture and sales." He had nonetheless been most proud of assisting Ford in introducing safety improvements to their lineup, including disc brakes and radial tires. In 1967, Time called Frey "Detroit's sharpest idea man".

Frey went on to a successful career as an innovator in manufacturing and information systems, and as chairman and CEO of Bell & Howell. In 1990, he received the National Medal of Technology in a White House ceremony. He was elected to the 2002 class of Fellows of the Institute for Operations Research and the Management Sciences.

== Background ==
Frey was born to Edward Muir Luken and Margaret Bryden (née Nelson) Frey in St. Louis, Missouri. His paternal great-grandfather, Abraham Frey, was born in Leipzig, Germany.

He grew up with his younger brother, Stuart M. (who later became chief engineer at Ford Motor Company after Donald), in Waterloo, Iowa, where his father worked for Deere & Company. His father, a metallurgist, designed the 1923 John Deere Model D tractor, and would later work for the Allis-Chalmers Manufacturing Company. As children, Frey and his brother had once made gunpowder — from scratch.

In 1940, Frey began engineering school at Michigan State College.

During World War II Frey worked on the Packard V-1650 version of the Rolls-Royce Merlin engine for Packard Motors. The engines were shipped to England for installation in Hurricanes and Spitfires. He then served as an officer in the United States Army (1942–1946).

After the war, he returned to his studies, this time at the University of Michigan in Ann Arbor. At Michigan's College of Engineering, he earned a Bachelor of Science degree in metallurgy (1947), a master's degree in systems engineering (1949), and a Ph.D. in metallurgical engineering (1951). During his doctoral studies, he was an assistant professor.

Frey married four times, to Margaret (mother of his six children), Mary Cameron, Arvelene Gore, and last wife Kay Eberley, from whom he was separated. He died March 5, 2010, in Evanston, Illinois, at age 86, survived by three daughters, Margaret Walton, Catherine McNair, and Elizabeth Sullivan and two sons, Christopher and Donald Jr.

Frey was trilingual (speaking English, Russian, and French), was an avid follower of opera and archaeology, and while at Ford, read "the London Times Literary Supplement as avidly as Ward's Automotive Reports." At the time of his death, Frey owned (and drove) a two-tone merlot and white 19641/2 Mustang.

== Ford and the Mustang ==
"I clearly remember sitting around the dining room table and my kids saying, ‘Dad, your cars stink. They're terrible. There's no pizzazz.' That started the whole thing."

— Donald Frey, 2004, describing his children's influence on the birth of the Ford Mustang

Frey started working for Ford in 1950, managing the metallurgy department. He was named vice-president and chief engineer in 1964. In addition to the multiple industrial innovations Frey oversaw at Ford, he supervised the prototype styling of the Ford Mustang and its later development.

Frey pursued the Mustang after Henry Ford II had rejected it four times, in no small part because of the Edsel's spectacular failure. Without formal approval, Frey met clandestinely with Lee Iacocca and other engineers and designers- notably lead stylists Philip T. Clark and John Najjar to continue developing the car.

Speaking to USA Today in 2004, Frey said, "The whole project was bootlegged, there was no official approval of this thing. We had to do it on a shoestring." Consequently, when Henry Ford II did approve the project, he put Frey in charge and told him he would be fired if the Mustang was not successful. Ultimately, the Mustang was a huge success, despite being engineered at one-tenth the cost of the 1965 Ford Galaxie.

Mike Mueller quoted Frey in his 2009 book Mustang: An American Classic as attributing the inspiration for the Mustang to GM's strategy of incrementally improving the Corvair. "I guess in desperation they put bucket seats in the thing, called it the Monza, and it started to sell".

Frey was also behind the four-door Ford Thunderbird (fifth generation), the stereo dashboard tape deck, and the station wagon tailgate that swung out like a door (window up or down) as well as down like a tailgate — marketed as the "Magic Doorgate" beginning with the 1966 Country Squire and Country Sedan. He was later involved in the development of the Ford Bronco, and played a key role in Ford Motorsports.

In 1967, he received an honorary Doctor of Engineering degree from the University of Michigan. He was very concerned that the United States was losing the "global race" for automobile improvements in technology because there was little interest in investments for innovation, and thus an increasing "gap" between the United States and Japan and Germany.

Also in 1967, Frey was elected to the National Academy of Engineering for the development of gas turbine engines.

Frey is one of the main characters in the movie Ford v Ferrari, in which he plays a role in the development of the Ford GT40.

== Later career ==
"Science is trying to explain the world as it is, while engineering is trying to design the world you'd like to have."

— Donald Frey

Frey left Ford in 1968, in part because of differences with fellow Ford executive Lee Iacocca, resigning to become president of General Cable Corporation. Environmental issues became Frey's focus, leading him to establish new copper recycling methods.

In 1971, he was appointed chairman and CEO of Bell & Howell, replacing Peter G. Peterson who left to join the Nixon Administration, making "a sweeping transformation of a company still known for film, microfiche and microfilm, as the video era dawned." Frey made several strategic acquisitions at Bell & Howell, sold off businesses (e.g., the DeVry Institute of Technology, now DeVry University), and he pioneered moves into video cassettes for movies and CD-ROM information systems in the 1970s and 1980s.

Frey was instrumental in promoting the first successful CD-ROM-based information system, designing the dealer auto parts catalog for General Motors, by David Gump, to be distributed to dealers on CD. Next, they put GM's maintenance records on CD-ROM, and then maintenance records for Mercedes-Benz, producing a computer file for every Mercedes ever made.

He also became a member of the board of directors at 20th Century Fox during this time. He helped bring about the first high-volume integrated manufacture of video cassettes for the motion picture industry. Tapes had previously been made in real-time, with hundreds of high school students changing out tapes, but when Bob Pfannkuch heard that DuPont started making tapes out of chromium dioxide instead of iron dioxide, Bell & Howell developed technology that could make a copy of a film in about a minute, cutting production time by over 99 percent.

Frey retired from active executive management in the industry in 1988. Just as he was to retire, Bell & Howell was bought out by the Robert M. Bass Group, headed by the wealthy Texas millionaire Robert Bass, proving serendipitous to Frey and the shareholders. With the buyout, the shares in Bell & Howell's stock price went from $5 to $64 per share during his tenure.

After Bell & Howell, he became a professor and researcher at Northwestern University, in the Industrial Engineering and Management Sciences (IE/MS) Department.

Frey was elected on December 13, 2004, to serve on the board of directors for Stonewater Control Systems.

=== Frey Prize ===
As a tribute to his parents (his father was an engineer and his mother was studying engineering when the couple married), he set up the Margaret and Muir Frey Memorial Prize for Innovation and Creativity ("Frey Prize") at the Robert R. McCormick School of Engineering and Applied Science at Northwestern University in 2001. The undergraduate prize "recognizes design creativity in the best senior capstone projects — projects that integrate aspects of the McCormick curriculum and are designed by a student or team of students to address known problems or credible new products or processes".
