= Philip T. Clark =

American automotive designer (1935–1968)

Philip Thomas Clark (1935–1968) was an American automotive designer who worked for both General Motors and Ford, and was responsible for ground-breaking designs such as the Ford Mustang and the Ford Capri.

== Early years ==
Born on October 27, 1935, in Iowa, Clark and his family moved to Nashville Tennessee in 1942. He was interested in music early in life, and later received a scholarship to Vanderbilt University to begin a medical career, which he abandoned due to the extreme hours required and the worsening of an unknown illness. Clark was apprenticed in aerodynamics with Avco Aviation where his father was the Vice President of Avco and his father-in-law was also a machinist. Clark had been training as an engineer for Avco before he became ill with urological issues and decided that transportation design would be a better fit for his health. Joining Sears, Clark turned to art and advertising, teaching himself using the art course offered by mail.

== Automobile design ==
Spurred by a love of cars, engineering and art, Clark sent some of his drawings to Chrysler Corporation, and received a letter from them that told him to choose an auto design school, complete the course (with honors) and then come back to them. Two schools were recommended: Pratt in New York, or the Art Center School of Design in Los Angeles. Clark graduated with honors as a designer and stylist from the Art Center School of Design with a double major in Art Transportation and Design.

=== General Motors ===
Clark was hired by a General Motors exec to work on the 1964 Futurama cars for the New York World Show. Working in GM Special Designs, he had a hand in the designs that Larry Shinoda made for the Chevrolet Corvair show cars.

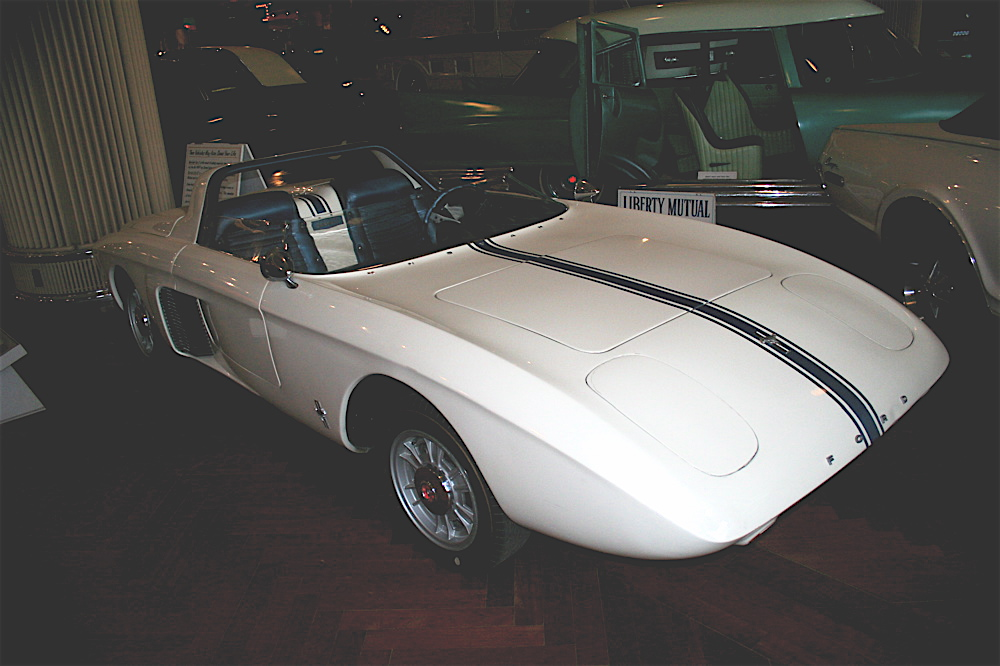
Ford Mustang I at the Henry Ford Museum

=== Ford Motor Company ===
==== Ford Mustang and Capri ====
After being released from GM in March 1962, Clark joined Ford in late-April 1962 to work on special projects. Clark's important design role was in creating the mid-engine designs for the Mustang I concept car that later made it up to the executives and met their approval. (Note: Najjar's statements dovetail with commentary in Phil Clark's original diaries from his time under design chief Eugene Bordinat.)

Clark had been conceptualizing the Mustang design in varied forms for years before the final car was produced. His drawing of the Mustang Coupe, or Fastback can be seen signed by him, in the Spring 1963 MotorBook Magazine. The Mustang name was kept under wraps with the code name "Allegro" assigned to the entire project. Allegro was a musical term and Clark and all of the designers he worked with were involved with various musical instruments. This gave the young group who originally were with GM a way to speak about the Mustang project in a code that no one to this day can decipher except for the original designers.

After traveling from his hometown in Nashville, Tennessee to the Art School of Design in Pasadena, California where he passed the wild mustangs in Nevada and was captivated by their beauty, Clark suggested the Mustang name to Ford executives. After public relations and the legal department vetted the project name (they particularly liked the connection to the wild horse of the same name), the name continued onto the Mustang II show car and later was applied to the production version of the Ford Mustang. The final decision on the name was left up to Lee Iacocca, the vice-president and general manager of the Ford Motor Company.

Clark also designed the Ford Capri, a fact which until recently was unknown.

=== Later work ===
Clark's designs continued to evolve and were influential in other Fords, including the GT-40 race car and its derivatives. Other designs were incorporated in Ford Europe products including the Ford Cortina.

Clark died at 32 from kidney failure. To this day he is known for his design of the Mustang "running horse" emblem. (Note: Phil Clark's daughter, Holly, has spent her life researching and writing about her father so as to keep his name attached to the art he conceived that was all but forgotten.)
