= Ford Mustang II (concept car) =

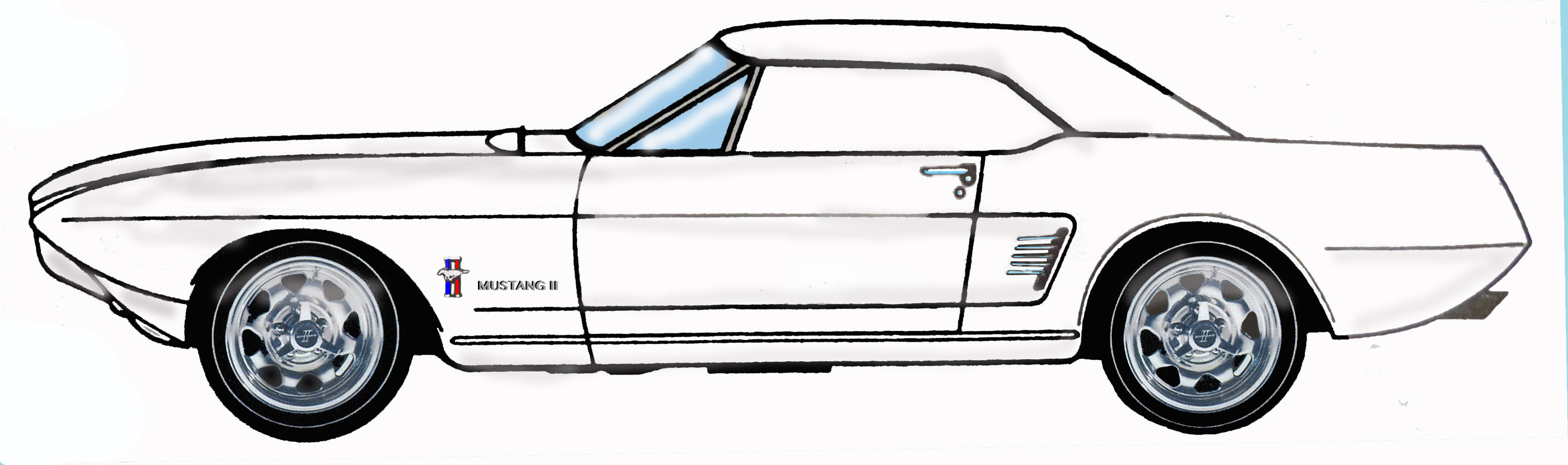
- 1963 Ford Mustang II sketch

Overview
- Manufacturer: Ford
- Production: 1963
- Assembly: Dearborn, Michigan
- Designer: Eugene Bordinat; John Najjar; James Sherbourne

Body and chassis
- Class: Concept car
- Body style: 2-door roadster/convertible
- Layout: front-engine layout
- Platform: Experimental

Powertrain
- Engine: 289 cu in (4.7 L) Windsor HiPo V8

Dimensions
- Wheelbase: 108 in (2,743 mm)
- Length: 186.6 in (4,740 mm)
- Width: 62 in (1,575 mm)
- Height: 48.4 in (1,229 mm)
- Curb weight: 2,445 lb (1,109 kg) (approximate)

The Ford Mustang II is a small, front-engined (V8), open "two-plus-two" concept car built by the Ford Motor Company in 1963. Although bearing the same name as the first generation production Mustang, the four-seater Mustang II which closely resembled the final production variant that would appear in 1964, was intended primarily for the auto show circuit. After debuting at the 1963 Watkins Glen Grand Prix, the Mustang II had a short lifespan as a show car before being relegated to the task of "test mule". The sole example still exists, albeit in storage at the Detroit Historical Museum.

== Design and development ==
=== Ford Mustang I ===
The original Ford Mustang was a product of the Fairlane Group, a committee of Ford managers and executives led by vice-president and General Manager Lee Iacocca. The Fairlane Group worked on new product needs and, in the summer of 1962, laid out the specifications of a new sports car, the genesis of the mid-engined Mustang I concept car.

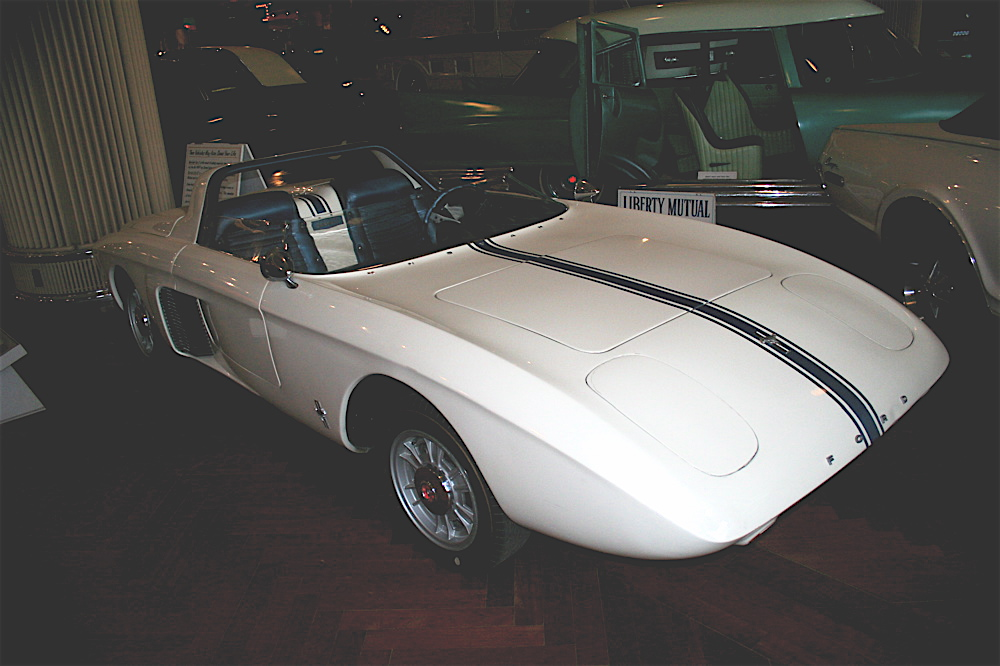
Ford Mustang I

A total of two cars were completed; a detailed, but non-running fiberglass mock-up, and a fully functional car that debuted at the United States Grand Prix in Watkins Glen, New York on October 7, 1962.

For the next two years, both Mustang Is appeared at automotive events garnering enthusiastic reactions, especially from a youth demographic at colleges. Reactions from potential customers and focus groups, however, demonstrated that the original concept of the Mustang I had limited appeal to the general public. Ford executives also worried that the mid-engined sports car "... was too complex for regular production."

=== Ford Mustang ===
Ford's marketing studies revealed that if a unique-looking "sporty car" could be offered at an affordable price, it would find many buyers. Iacocca had already introduced sporty versions of the Ford Falcon compact car with limited success, The Fairlane Group began to work on a front-engine, four-seater design, one of approximately 13 designs, variously known as the T-5 in company parlance, and later, the Mustang. To speed development, Ford Falcon and Fairlane components were used. Nearly the only design element that remained from the original Mustang I were the fake louvers that recreated the radiator scoops of the two-seater, and its name, emblazoned on its side panels as the "galloping Mustang" logo.

The J. Walter Thompson Advertising agency created a marketing campaign that incorporated "sneak views" and specialized audience surveys that revealed the future Mustang to the general public. The initial publicity created a groundswell of enquiries that filtered all the way back to Ford headquarters.

=== Ford Mustang II ===
Iacocca knew that the public interest in the Mustang was strong, but he wanted to pique further enthusiasm by creating a concept car that would hint at future Ford products. The result was the Mustang II, redesigned by stylist John Najjar using elements of the Mustang I. The car, initially still known as the "Cougar" was based on a pre-production prototype, and fabricated by the Dearborn Steel Tubing (DST) company. (Note: Ford had used DST for decades as a custom fabrication and modification shop for prototypes that were intended for evaluation and modeling purposes.) The prototype bore the designation: "X 8902-SB-208".

Visually, the Mustang II resembled the first generation Mustang, with the same triple-bar taillights, faux side louvers and the 108-inch wheelbase, but some modifications made it a unique variant. The steel body, reinforced by fibreglass sections was five inches longer and three inches shorter in height. The body did not incorporate bumpers and featured a cut-back, swept low-profile windscreen and buried, sculpted headlight treatment. Starting with the original car's roof cut off to create a convertible, a detachable fibreglass hardtop was made, but the Mustang II often appeared as a roadster. The interior had "aircraft-styled" instrument clusters with Ford Falcon speedometer predominating and the rest, handmade upholstery on "... mostly a wood frame. The whole interior treatment is fibreglass and things held up with pieces of 2x4 jammed into big blobs of putty."

On October 5, 1963. the Mustang II made its formal debut at Watkins Glen, New York, the day before the United States Grand Prix, replicating the public launch of the Mustang I at the same event the previous year. The Mustang II only appeared a few more times through the winter of 1964 at auto shows as a show car. It served to stir interest in the future Mustang before being eclipsed by the imminent public launch of its counterpart.

== Final disposition ==
From its formal April 17, 1964 introduction by Henry Ford II at the World's Fair in Flushing Meadows, New York, the Mustang was an enormous sales success, launching the pony car phenomenon. Being fully operational with a 271-hp V8, and the first and only steel-bodied design study ahead of the definitive 1964 production Mustang, the Mustang II was saved from being scrapped when R&D engineers needed a test mule. (Note: Over time, the original engine was replaced as was the steering wheel, and the car did show signs of wear.) The Mustang II was eventually donated by Ford to the Detroit Historical Society in 1975, where it still resides in storage.
