= Ford Mustang I =

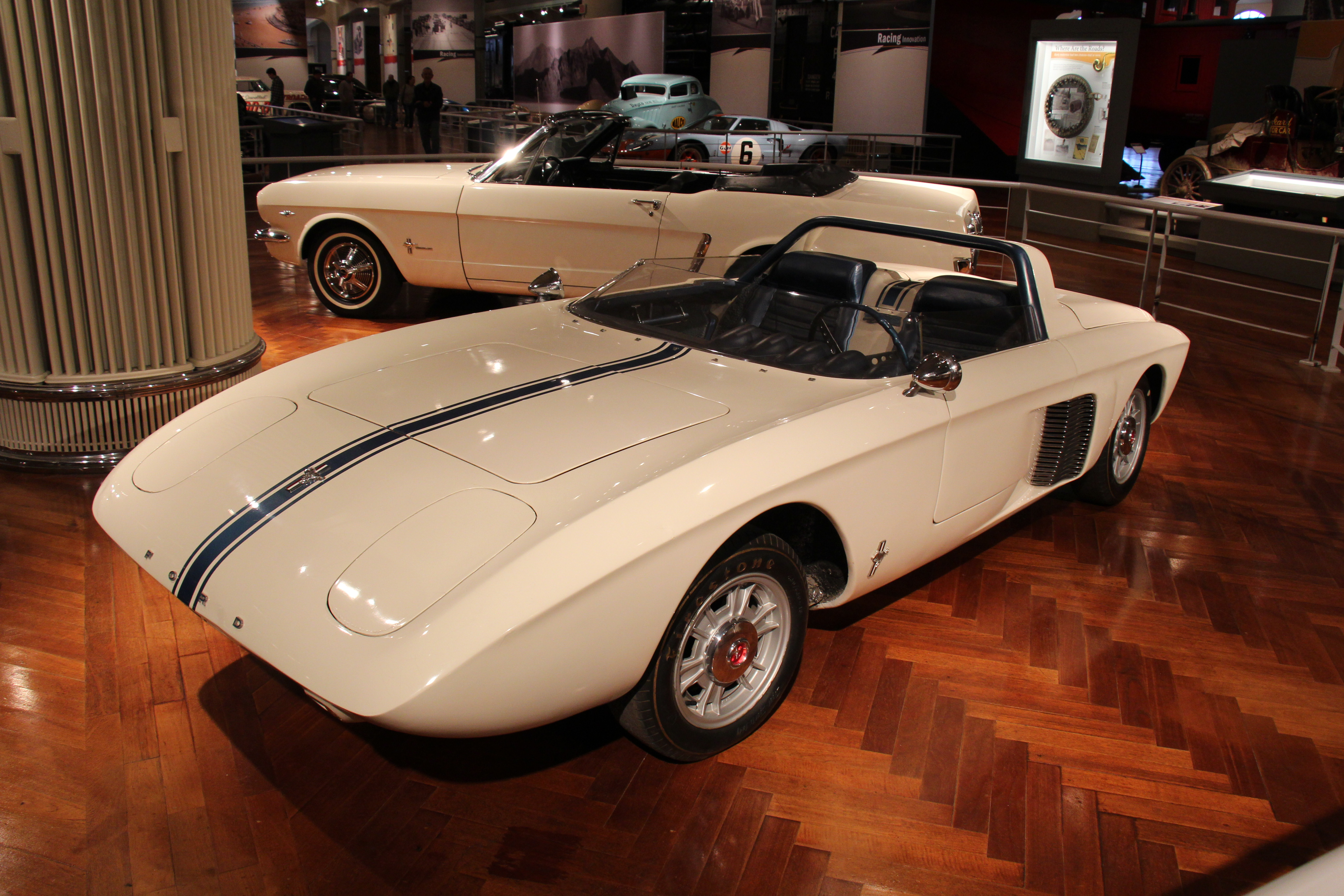
- Ford Mustang I at the Henry Ford Museum

Overview
- Manufacturer: Ford
- Designer: Eugene Bordinat, Roy Lunn, John Najjar

Body and chassis
- Class: Concept car
- Body style: 2-door roadster
- Layout: mid-engine layout
- Platform: Experimental

Powertrain
- Engine: 91 cu in (1.5 L) V4

Dimensions
- Wheelbase: 90 in (2,286 mm)
- Length: 154.2 in (3,917 mm)
- Width: 62 in (1,575 mm)
- Height: 39.2 in (996 mm) (over roll bar)
- Curb weight: 1,544 lb (700 kg)

The Ford Mustang I is a small, mid-engined (4-cylinder), open two-seater concept car with aluminium body work that was built by Ford in 1962. Although it shared few design elements with the final production vehicle, it did lend its name to the line.

== Design and development ==
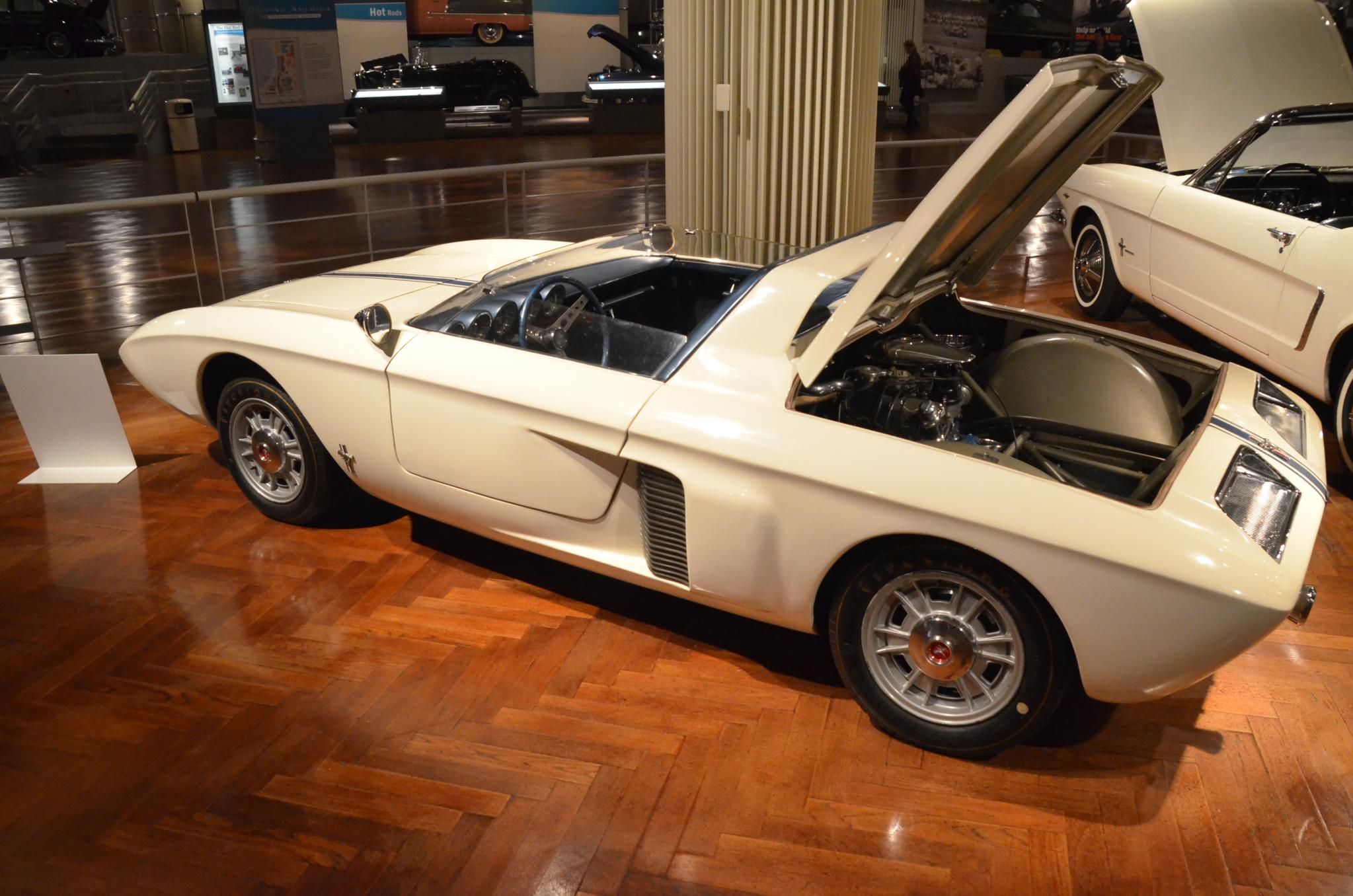
Rear view with the engine cover open

The original Ford Mustang was a product of the Fairlane Group, a committee of Ford managers led by Lee Iacocca. The Fairlane Group worked on new product needs and, in the summer of 1962, the Group laid out the framework of a new sports car. The automaker made a "tentative bid to fill a vacuum between Go-Karts and the Corvette" as well as to compete in FIA category 9 (SCCA Class G)." Popular Mechanics compared it to the imported MG 1600 Mark II and Sunbeam Alpine Series II sports cars.

Designer Eugene Bordinat envisioned a low-cost sports car that would combine roadability, performance, and appearance in a radical layout. Ford designer Philip T. Clark had been working on the low-slung Mustang design in varied forms for years. Bordinat coordinated the development of the styling and oversaw the first drawings into a clay model in three weeks. A 90 in (2,286.0 mm) wheelbase, 48 in (1,219 mm) front and a 49 in (1,245 mm) rear track were the working dimensions. The body skin was a one-piece unit that was riveted to a space frame. To increase rigidity, the seats were part of the body. The driver could adjust the steering column and clutch/brake/accelerator pedals.

Roy Lunn was put in charge as the product planner for building the car. His racing car design experience together with his engineering really brought the concept to life. Lunn, working with Herb Misch as the project engineer, "designed the chassis to accommodate four-wheel independent suspension, rack and pinion steering, and front disc brakes." A lightweight and physically compact Ford Cardinal 1,500 cc 60° V4 engine powered the Mustang I. (Note: Derived from the Cardinal, it was a 60° V4 with a bore × stroke of 90 mm × 60 mm (3.54 in × 2.36 in), displacing 1,927 cc (117.6 cu in), producing 90 bhp (67 kW) at 6,500 rpm.) The front-wheel-drive powertrain from the Cardinal project, which debuted in Ford Germany's Taunus sedans in 1962, was mounted directly behind the cockpit with the engine and 4-speed transmission in a common housing with an axle and conventional clutch.

Ford Lead Designer and Executive Stylist John Najjar favored a mid-engined configuration, cooled through two separate radiators on the sides of the car. Najjar also proposed the name "Mustang" for the concept vehicle. As an aviation enthusiast, Najjar was familiar with the North American P-51 Mustang fighter. He saw some design similarities in the diminutive but sleek profile of the new sports car.

The car featured a plastic racing-type windshield and an integral roll bar. Other unique features included a dual-brake line system, telescoping steering wheel, and adjustable foot pedals. Two versions of the V4 engine were available, an 89 hp (66 kW) street and a 109 hp (81 kW) race engine. Racecar builders, Troutman-Barnes of Culver City, California, used the clay and fiberglass body bucks to create an aluminum body. Lunn and his team of engineers finished the prototypes in just 100 days. Only two cars were built: a detailed, but non-running fiberglass mock-up, and a fully functional car. The "exotic was never close to becoming a production car" was completed in August 1962.

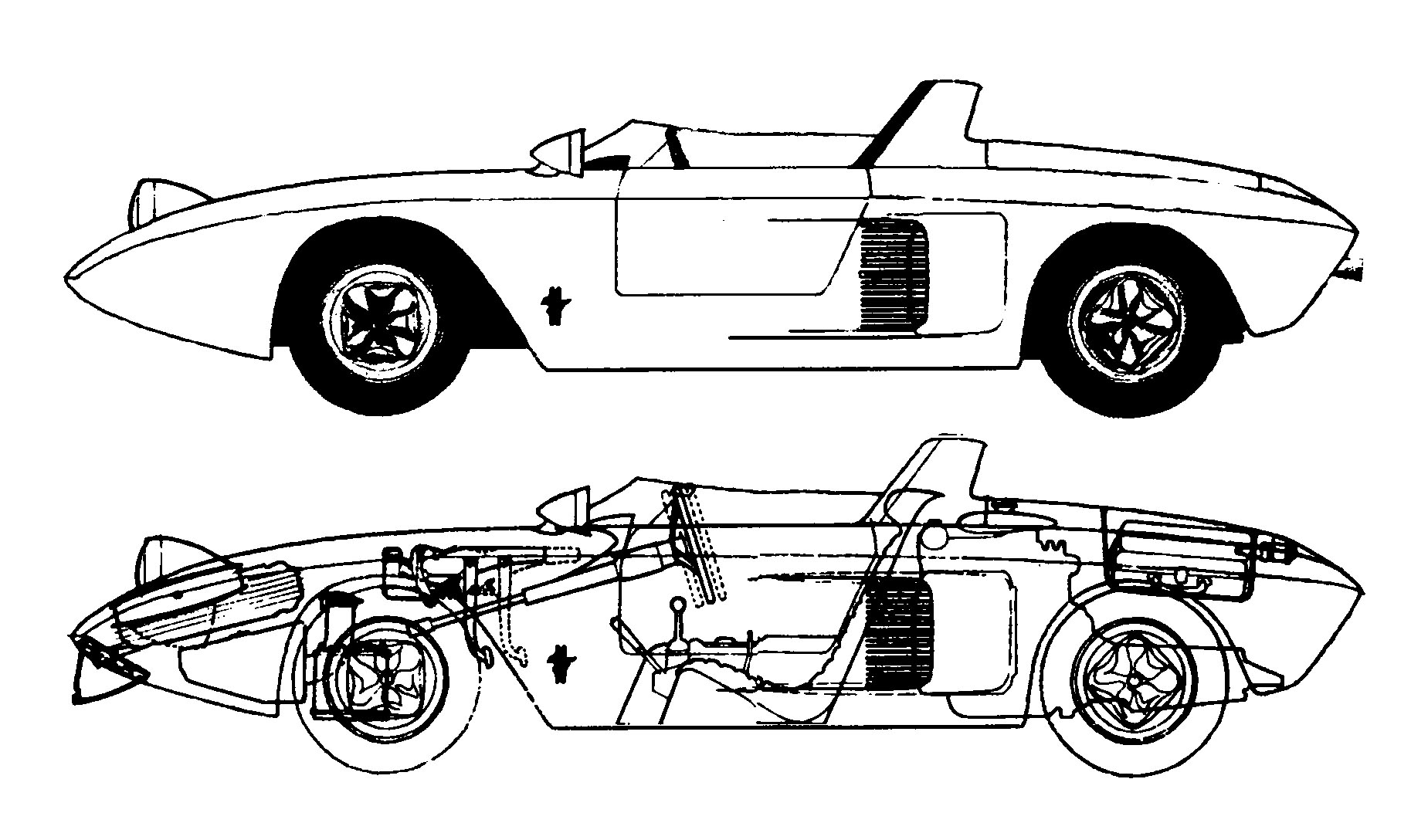
Schematic view of Ford Mustang I

=== Public debut ===
The Mustang I made its formal debut at the United States Grand Prix in Watkins Glen, New York on October 7, 1962, where test driver and contemporary Formula One race driver Dan Gurney lapped the track in a demonstration of the prototype. He reportedly drove the car "to 120 ... causing the automotive rumor mill [to begin] churning even faster" with reports by Motor Trend that "Ford will produce a sports car to compete with the Corvette" which was exactly the publicity stunt Lee Iacocca was hoping to achieve.

For the next two years, both Mustang Is appeared at car shows and automotive events as show cars. The model attracted attention, "but was too complex for regular production." An unusual use for the cars was to tour colleges as a marketing tool for Ford. After reactions from potential customers and focus groups had demonstrated that the original concept of the Mustang I had limited appeal to the general public, a completely new concept car, the Mustang II, appeared in 1963. With the appearance of this Mustang II concept car, the original "Mustang" concept car became the Mustang I. Both cars were from Eugene Bordinat's Advanced Design group, which developed 13 Mustang concepts. The original code name for this group of cars was also "Allegro". One of the cars from this design project actually became known as Allegro.

The four-seater Mustang was known beforehand to be the car that would actually be produced for sale using the first generation Ford Falcon platform. Based on a four-seater configuration and using a front-engine layout based on the Falcon, the Mustang II was much more conventional in design and concept and closely resembled the final production variant that would appear in 1964. Nearly the only design element that remained from the original Mustang I were the fake louvers that recreated the radiator scoops of the two-seater.

== Final disposition ==
The one operational Mustang I was donated to The Henry Ford Museum in 1974.
