= Ford Mustang =

American car manufactured by Ford

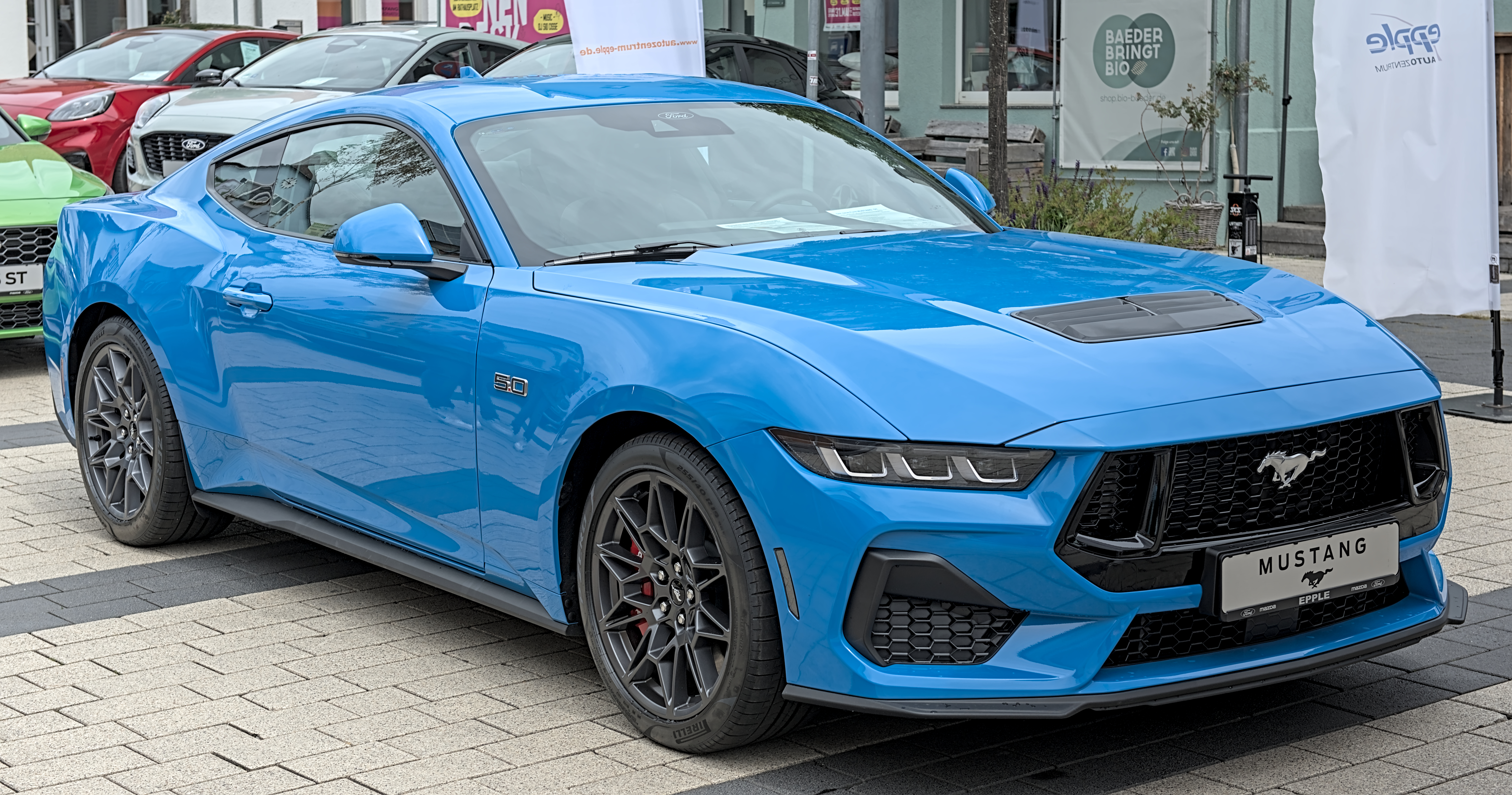
- 2025 Ford Mustang GT

Overview
- Manufacturer: Ford
- Also called: Ford T5 (Germany)
- Production: March 1964 – present
- Model years: 1965–present

Body and chassis
- Class: Pony car, muscle car (America); Roadster sport (Europe); Sports car (international)
- Body style: 2-door coupe; 3-door hatchback; 2-door fastback; 2-door convertible
- Layout: Front-engine, rear-wheel-drive layout

The Ford Mustang is an American automobile manufactured and marketed by Ford since 1964, as Ford's longest nameplate in continuous production. Currently in its seventh generation, it is the fifth-best selling Ford car nameplate. The namesake of the "pony car" automobile segment, the Mustang was developed as a highly styled line of sporty coupes and convertibles derived from existing model lines, initially distinguished by its pronounced "long hood, short deck" proportions.

Originally predicted to sell 100,000 vehicles yearly, the 1965 Mustang became the most successful vehicle launch since the 1927 Model A. Introduced on April 17, 1964 (16 days after the Plymouth Barracuda), over 400,000 units were sold in its first year; the one-millionth Mustang was sold within two years of its launch. In August 2018, Ford produced the 10-millionth Mustang; matching the first 1965 Mustang, the vehicle was a 2019 Wimbledon White convertible with a V8 engine.

The success of the Mustang launch led to multiple competitors from other American manufacturers, including the Chevrolet Camaro and Pontiac Firebird (1967), AMC Javelin (1968), and Dodge Challenger (1970). It also competed with the Plymouth Barracuda, which was launched around the same time. The Mustang also had an effect on designs of coupes worldwide, leading to the marketing of the Toyota Celica and Ford Capri in the United States (the latter, by Lincoln-Mercury). The Mercury Cougar was launched in 1967 as a unique-bodied higher-trim alternative to the Mustang; during the 1970s, it included more features and was marketed as a personal luxury car.

From 1965 until 2004, the Mustang shared chassis commonality with other Ford model lines, staying rear-wheel-drive throughout its production. From 1965 to 1973, the Mustang was derived from the 1960 Ford Falcon compact. From 1974 until 1978, the Mustang (denoted Mustang II) was a longer-wheelbase version of the Ford Pinto. From 1979 until 2004, the Mustang shared its Fox platform chassis with 14 other Ford vehicles (becoming the final one to use the Fox architecture). Since 2005, the Mustang has used the D2C platform, unique to the Mustang.

Through its production, multiple nameplates have been associated with the Ford Mustang series, including GT, Mach 1, Boss 302/429, Cobra (separate from Shelby Cobra), and Bullitt, along with "5.0" fender badging (denoting 4.9 L OHV or 5.0 L DOHC V8 engines).

== Genesis of the nameplate ==
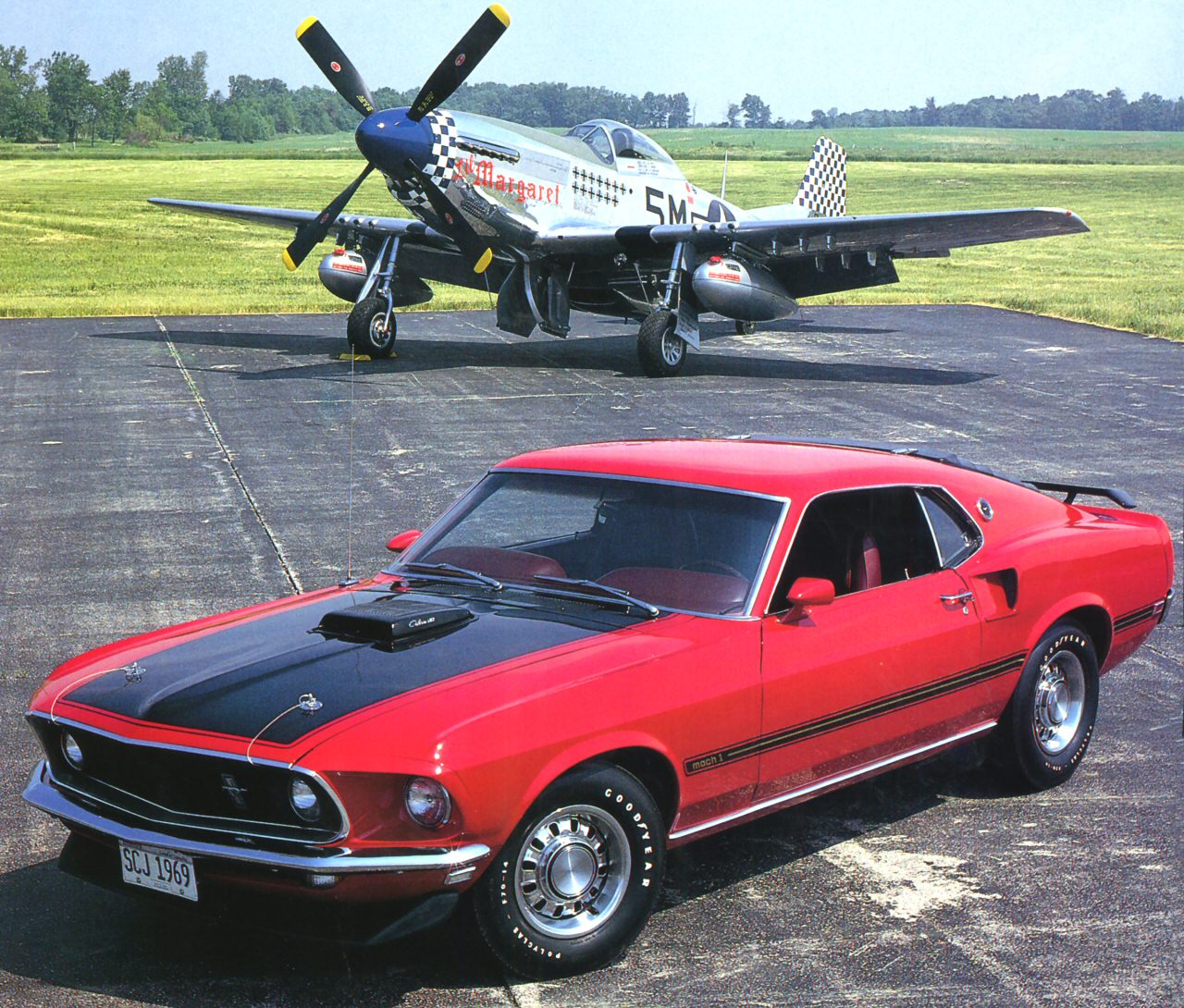
A 1969 Ford Mustang Mach I and a P-51 Mustang

Executive stylist John Najjar, who was a fan of the World War II P-51 Mustang fighter plane, is credited by Ford with suggesting the name. Najjar co-designed the first prototype of the Ford Mustang known as the "Ford Mustang I" in 1961, working jointly with fellow Ford stylist Philip T. Clark. The Mustang I made its formal debut at the United States Grand Prix in Watkins Glen, New York, on October 7, 1962, where test driver and contemporary Formula One race driver Dan Gurney lapped the track in a demonstration using the second "race" prototype.

An alternative view was that Robert J. Eggert, Ford Division market research manager, first suggested the Mustang name. Eggert, a breeder of quarterhorses, received a birthday present from his wife of the book, The Mustangs by J. Frank Dobie in 1960. Later, the book's title gave him the idea of adding the "Mustang" name for Ford's new concept car. The designer preferred Cougar (early styling bucks can be seen wearing a Cougar grille emblem) or Torino (an advertising campaign using the Torino name was actually prepared), while Henry Ford II wanted T-bird II. As the person responsible for Ford's research on potential names, Eggert added "Mustang" to the list to be tested by focus groups; "Mustang", by a wide margin, came out on top under the heading: "Suitability as Name for the Special Car". The name could not be used in Germany, however, because it was owned by Krupp, which had manufactured trucks between 1951 and 1964 with the name "Mustang". Ford refused to buy the name for about US$10,000 (equivalent to $103,809 in 2025) from Krupp at the time. Kreidler, a manufacturer of mopeds, also used the name, so Mustangs were sold in Germany as "T-5s" until December 1978.

== First generation (1965) ==
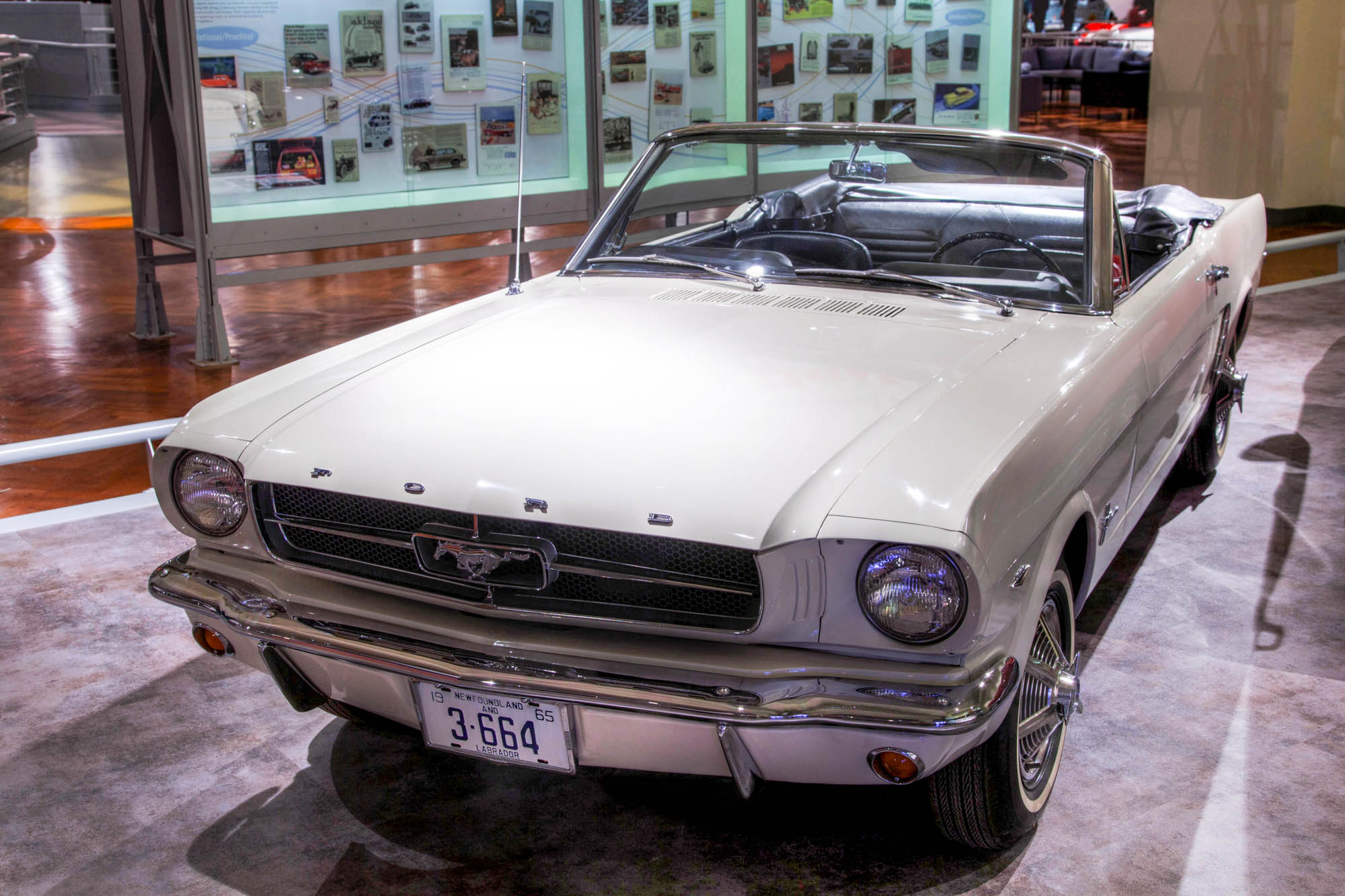
"1964½" Mustang convertible serial No. 1, sold to Stanley Tucker who was given the one millionth Mustang in exchange for his historic car

Lee Iacocca's assistant general manager and chief engineer, Donald N. Frey, was the head engineer for the T-5 project—supervising the overall development of the car in a record 18 months—while Iacocca himself championed the project as Ford Division general manager. The T-5 prototype was a two-seat, mid-mounted engine roadster. This vehicle employed the German Ford Taunus V4 engine.

The original 1962 Ford Mustang I two-seater concept car had evolved into the 1963 Mustang II four-seater concept car which Ford used to pretest how the public would take interest in the first production Mustang. The 1963 Mustang II concept car was designed with a variation of the production model's front and rear ends with a roof that was 2.7 in (69 mm) lower. It was originally based on the platform of the second-generation North American Ford Falcon, a compact car. Gale Halderman's side view design is the basis for the first clay model.

=== Non-traditional (1964 1/2) introduction ===
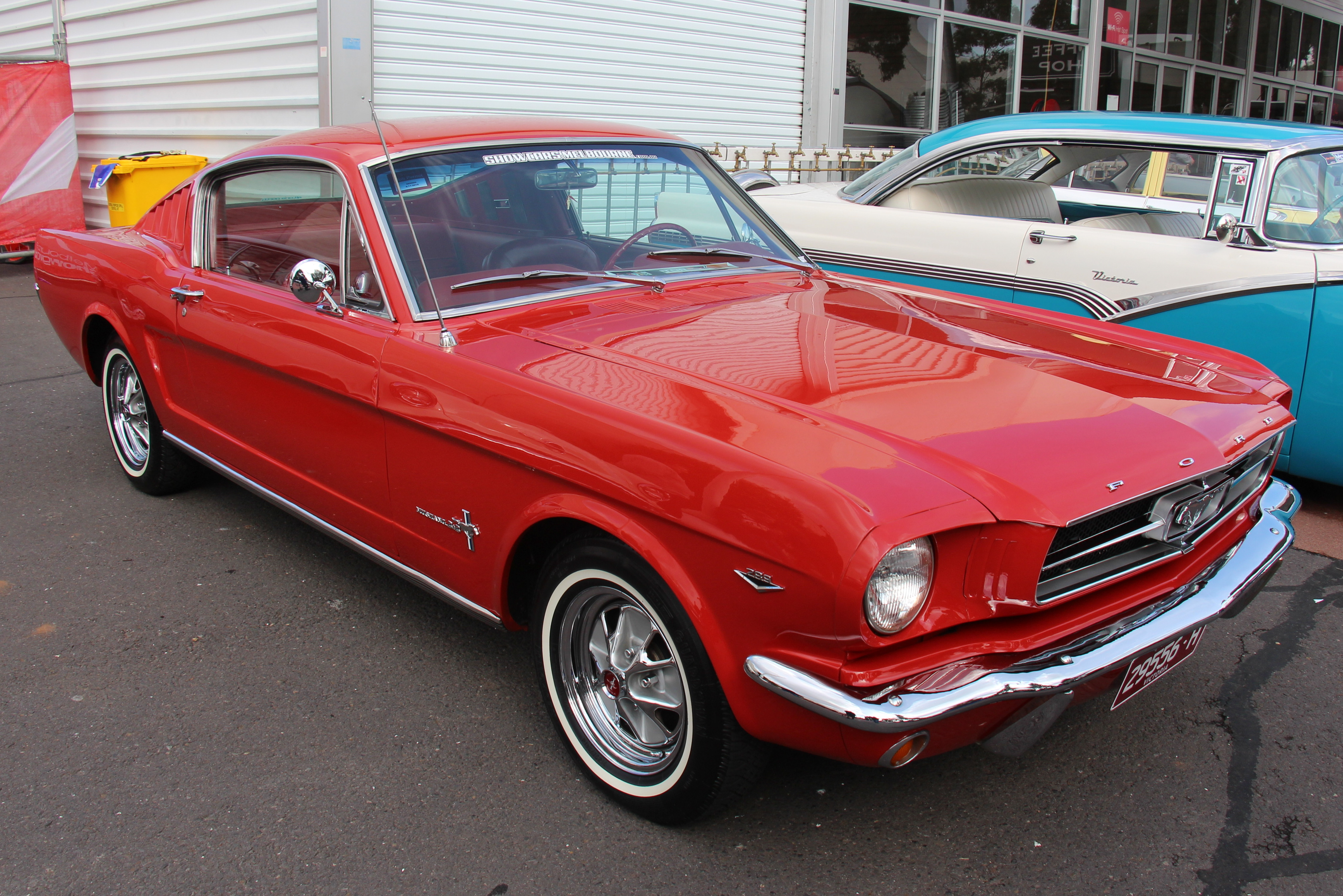
1965 "fastback", introduced in September 1964 for the 1965 model year

The Ford Mustang began production five months before the normal start of the 1965 production year. The early production versions are often referred to as "1964½ models", but all Mustangs were advertised, VIN coded, and titled by Ford as 1965 models, though minor design updates in August 1964 at the formal start of the 1965 production year contribute to tracking 1964 1/2 production data separately from 1965 data (see data below). With production beginning in Dearborn, Michigan, on March 9, 1964; the new car was, on 14 April 1964, first sold to the public, at a Ford dealership in St. John's, Newfoundland, Canada before it was even introduced on April 17, 1964, at the New York World's Fair. Body styles available included a two-door hardtop and convertible, with a "2+2" fastback added to the line in September 1964. A Wimbledon White (paint code P) convertible with red interior was used as product placement when the James Bond movie Goldfinger was released September 17, 1964, at its London premiere, where Bond girl Tilly Masterson was in a spirited chase with James driving an Aston Martin DB5 in the Swiss Alps. A Tropical Turquoise (paint code O) coupe was again used in the next film Thunderball at its Tokyo premiere 9 December 1965 with Bond girl Fiona Volpe as she drives James to meet the villain Emilio Largo at his compound at a very high speed across The Bahamas.

Favorable publicity articles appeared in 2,600 newspapers the next morning, the day the car was "officially" revealed. A four-seat car with full space for the front bucket seats and a rear bench seat was standard. A "fastback 2+2", first manufactured on August 17, 1964, enclosed the trunk space under a sweeping exterior line similar to the second series Corvette Sting Ray and European sports cars such as the Jaguar E-Type coupe.

=== Price and record-breaking sales ===
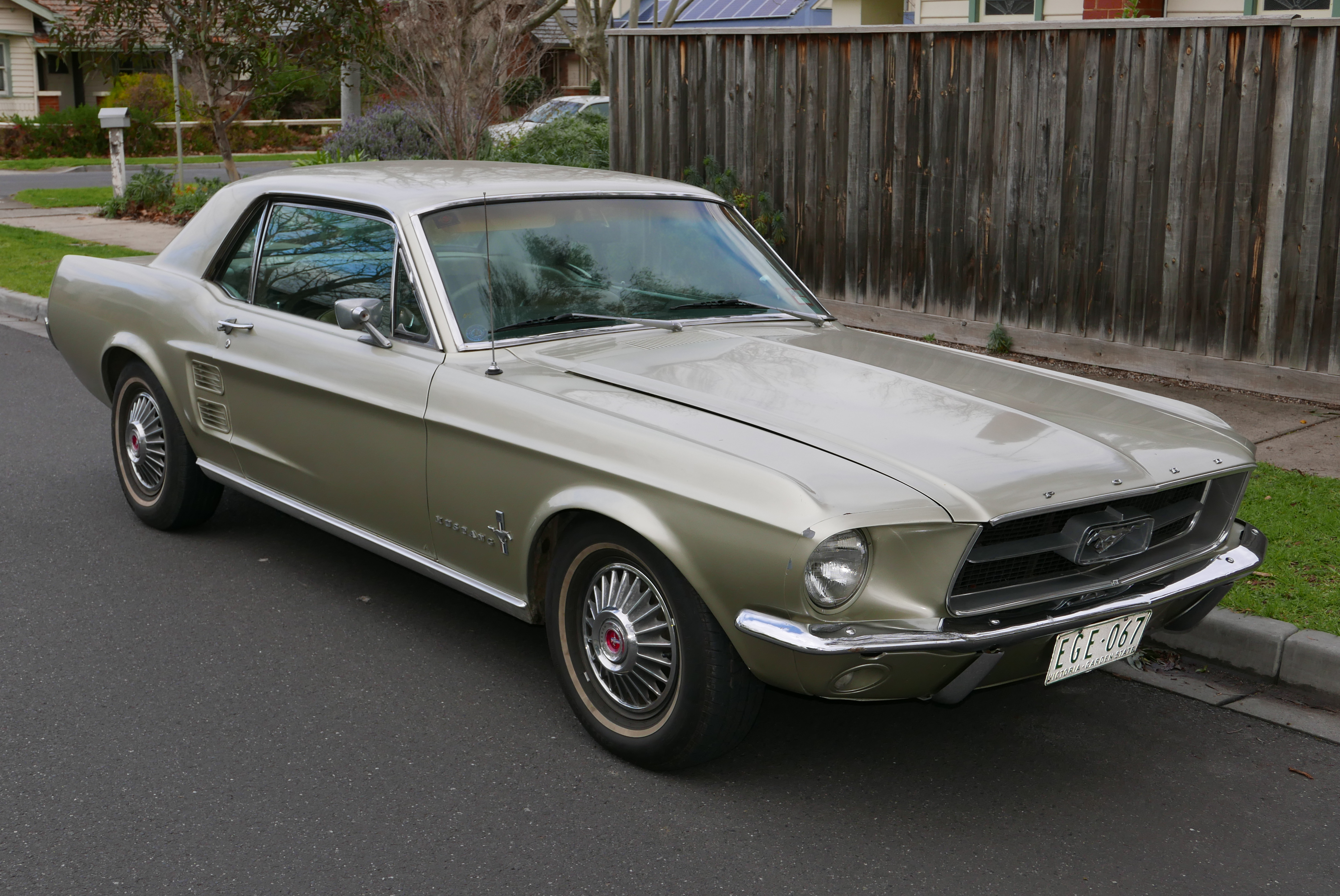
1967 hardtop

To achieve an advertised list price of US$2,368 (equivalent to $24,193 in 2025), the Mustang was based heavily on familiar yet simple components, many of which were already in production for other Ford models. Many (if not most) of the interior, chassis, suspension, and drivetrain components were derived from those used on Ford's Falcon and Fairlane. This use of common components also shortened the learning curve for assembly and repair workers, while at the same time allowing dealers to pick up the Mustang without also having to invest in additional spare parts inventory to support the new car line. Original sales forecasts projected less than 100,000 units for the first year. This mark was surpassed in three months from rollout. Another 318,000 would be sold during the model year (a record), and in its first eighteen months, more than one million Mustangs were built.

=== Upgrades ===
Several changes were made at the traditional opening of the new model year (beginning August 1964), including the addition of back-up lights on some models, the introduction of alternators to replace generators, an upgrade of the six-cylinder engine from 170 to 200 cu in (2.8 to 3.3 L) with an increase from 101 to 120 hp (75 to 89 kW), and an upgrade of the V8 engine from 260 to 289 cu in (4.3 to 4.7 L) with an increase from 164 to 210 hp (122 to 157 kW). The rush into production included some unusual quirks, such as the horn ring bearing the 'Ford Falcon' logo covered by a trim ring with a 'Ford Mustang' logo. These characteristics made enough difference to warrant designation of the 121,538 early versions as "1964½" Mustangs, a distinction that has endured with purists.

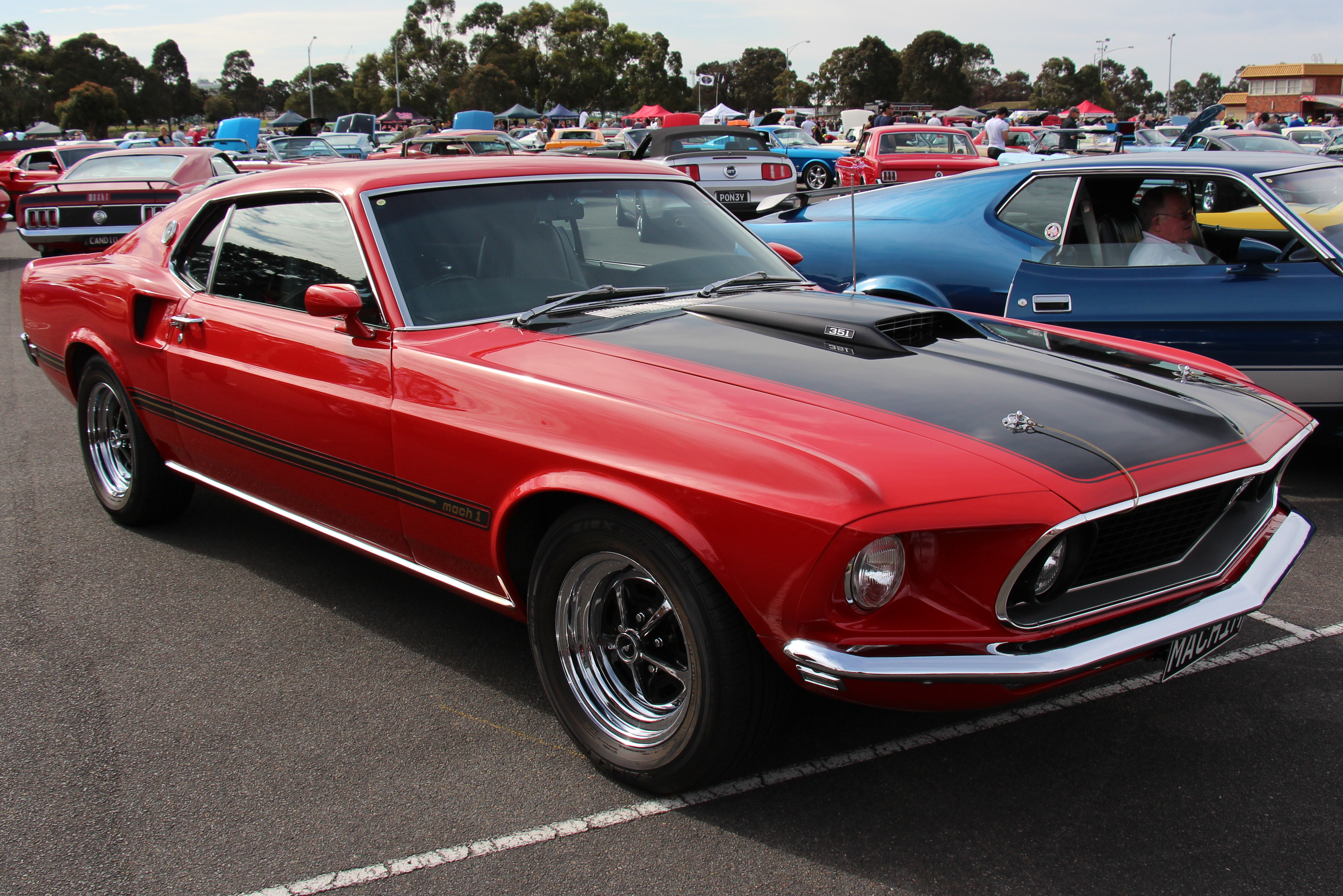
A 1969 SportsRoof

Ford's designers began drawing up larger versions even as the original was achieving sales success, and while "Iacocca later complained about the Mustang's growth, he did oversee the 1967 redesign." From 1967 until 1973, the Mustang got bigger but not necessarily more powerful. The Mustang was facelifted, giving the Mustang a more massive look overall and allowing a big block engine to be offered for the first time. Front and rear end styling was more pronounced, and the "twin cove" instrument panel offered a thicker crash pad and larger gauges. Hardtop, fastback, and convertible body styles continued as before. Around this time, the Mustang was paired with a Mercury variant, called the Cougar, which used its own styling cues, such as a "prowling cat" logo and hidden quad headlamps. New safety regulations by the U.S. National Highway Traffic Safety Administration (NHTSA) for 1967 included an energy-absorbing steering column and wheel, 4-way emergency flashers, and a dual-circuit hydraulic braking system, and softer interior knobs. The 1968 models received revised side scoops, steering wheel, and gasoline caps. Side marker lights were also added that year, and cars built after January 1, 1968, included shoulder belts for both front seats on coupes. The 1968 models also introduced a new 302 cu in (4.9 L) V8 engine, designed with Federal emissions regulations in mind.

The 1969 restyle "added more heft to the body as width and length again increased. Weight went up markedly too." Due to the larger body and revised front end styling, the 1969 models (but less so in 1970) had a notable aggressive stance. The 1969 models featured "quad headlamps" which disappeared to make way for a wider grille and a return to standard headlamps in the 1970 models. This switch back to standard headlamps was an attempt to tame the aggressive styling of the 1969 model, which some felt was too extreme and hurt sales, but 1969 production exceeded the 1970 total.

=== Models ===
Starting in 1969, to aid sales and continue the winning formula of the Mustang, a variety of new performance and decorative options became available, including functional (and non-functional) air scoops, cable and pin hood tie-downs, and both wing and chin spoilers. Additionally, a variety of performance packages were introduced that included the Mach 1, the Boss 302, and Boss 429. The two Boss models were to homologate the engines for racing. The 1969 Mustang was the last year for the GT option (although it did return on the third-generation Mustang for the 1982 model year). A fourth model available only as a hardtop, the Grandé, saw success starting in 1969 with its soft ride, "luxurious" trim, 55 pounds (25 kg) of extra sound deadening, and simulated wood trim.

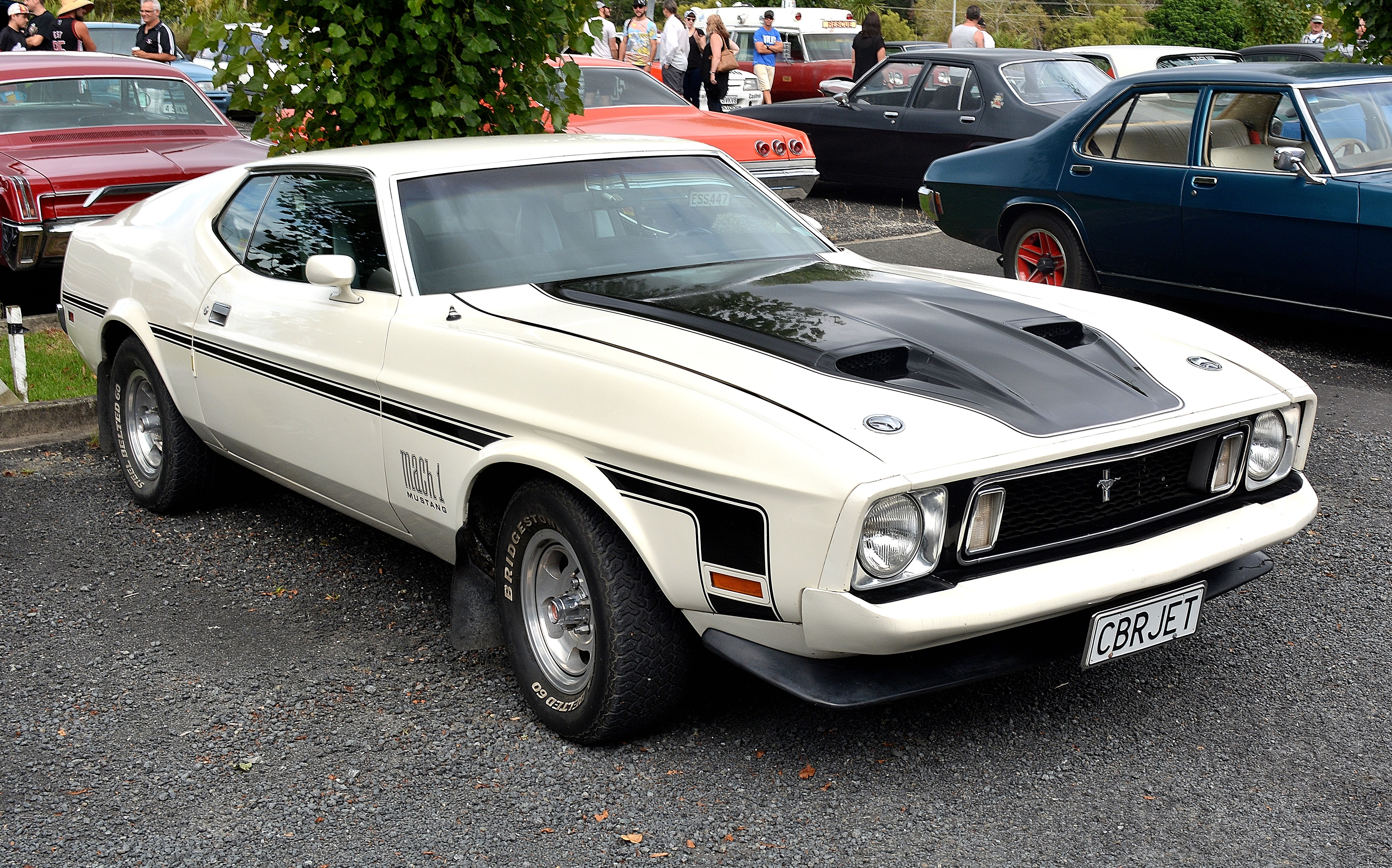
A 1973 Sportsroof

=== Sales fluctuation ===
Developed under the watch of S. "Bunkie" Knudsen, Mustang evolved "from speed and power" to the growing consumer demand for bigger and heavier "luxury" type designs. "The result was the styling misadventures of 1971–73 ...the Mustang grew fat and lazy," "Ford was out of the go-fast business almost entirely by 1971." "This was the last major restyling of the first-generation Mustang." "The cars grew in every dimension except height, and they gained about 800 pounds (360 kg)." "The restyling also sought to create the illusion that the cars were even larger." The 1971 Mustang was nearly 3 inches (75 mm) wider than the 1970, its front and rear track was also widened by 3 inches (75 mm), and its size was most evident in the SportsRoof models with its nearly flat rear roofline and cramped interior with poor visibility for the driver. Performance decreased with sales continuing to decrease as consumers switched to the smaller Pintos and Mavericks. A displeased Iacocca summed up later: "The Mustang market never left us, we left it."

== Second generation (1974) ==
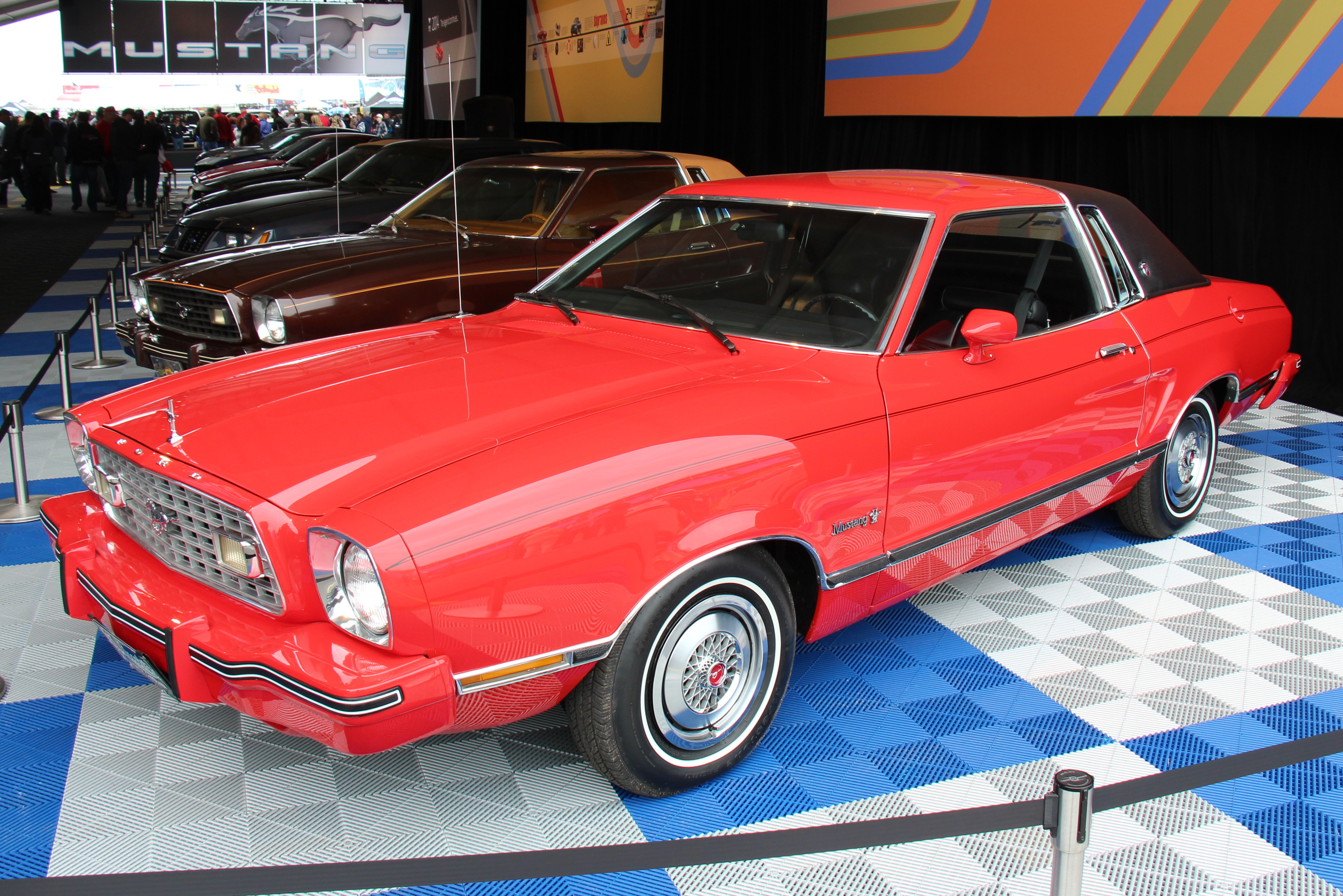
1974 Mustang II Ghia

Iacocca, who had been one of the forces behind the original Mustang, became president of Ford Motor Company in 1970, and ordered a smaller, more fuel-efficient Mustang for 1974. Initially, it was to be based on the Ford Maverick, but ultimately was based on the Ford Pinto subcompact.

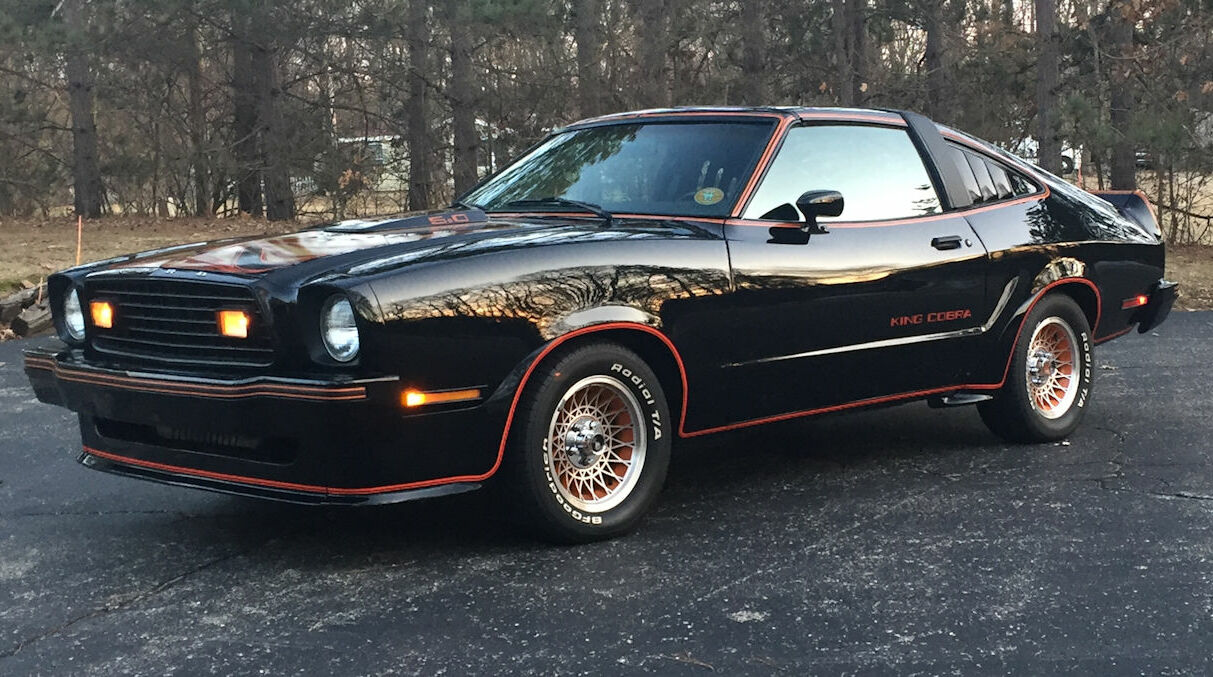
1978 Mustang II King Cobra

The new model, called the "Mustang II", was introduced on September 21, 1973, two months before the first 1973 oil crisis, and its reduced size allowed it to compete against successful imported sports coupes such as the Japanese Datsun 240Z, Toyota Celica and the European Ford Capri (then Ford-built in Germany and Britain, sold in U.S. by Mercury as a captive import car). The Mustang II also later competed against the Chevrolet Monza, Pontiac Sunbird, Oldsmobile Starfire and Buick Skyhawk. First-year sales were 385,993 cars, compared with the original Mustang's twelve-month sales record of 418,812. Ultimately, the Mustang II was an early example of downsizing that would take place among Detroit's Big Three during the "malaise era".

Iacocca wanted the new car, which returned the Mustang to its 1965 model year predecessor in size, shape, and overall styling, to be finished to a high standard, saying it should be "a little jewel". Not only was it smaller than the original car, but it was also heavier, owing to the addition of equipment needed to meet new U.S. emission and safety regulations. Performance was reduced, and despite the car's new handling and engineering features the galloping mustang emblem "became a less muscular steed that seemed to be cantering".

Engines for the 1974 models included the venerable 2.3 L I4 from the Pinto and the 2.8 L Cologne V6 from the Mercury Capri. The 1975 model year reintroduced the 302 cu in (4.9 L) Windsor V8 that was only available with the C-4 automatic transmission, power brakes, and power steering. This continued through production's end in 1978. Other transmissions were the RAD four-speed with unique gearing for all three engines, and the C-3 automatic behind the 2.3 L and 2.8 L. The "5.0 L" marketing designation was not applied until the 1978 King Cobra model. All 302 cu in (4.9 L)-equipped Mustang IIs, except the King Cobras, received updated versions of the classic Ford "V8" emblem on each front fender.

The car was available in coupe and hatchback versions, including a "luxury" Ghia model designed by Ford's recently acquired Ghia of Italy. The coupe was marketed as a "hardtop" but actually had a thin "B" pillar and rear quarter windows that did not roll down. All Mustangs in this generation did feature frameless door glass, however. The "Ghia" featured a thickly padded vinyl roof and starting with 1975 models smaller rear quarter windows, giving a more formal look. 1974 models were: hardtop, hatchback, Mach 1, and Ghia. Changes introduced for 1975 included the availability of an "MPG" model which had a different rear axle ratio for better fuel economy. 1976 added the "Stallion" trim package. The Mach 1 remained through the life cycle 1974–1978. Other changes in appearance and performance came with a "Cobra II" version in 1976–1978 and a "King Cobra" in 1978 of which around 4,972 were built. The 1977–1978 hatchback models in all trim levels were now available with the T-top roof option, which included a leatherette storage bag that clipped to the top of the spare tire hump.

== Third generation (1979) ==
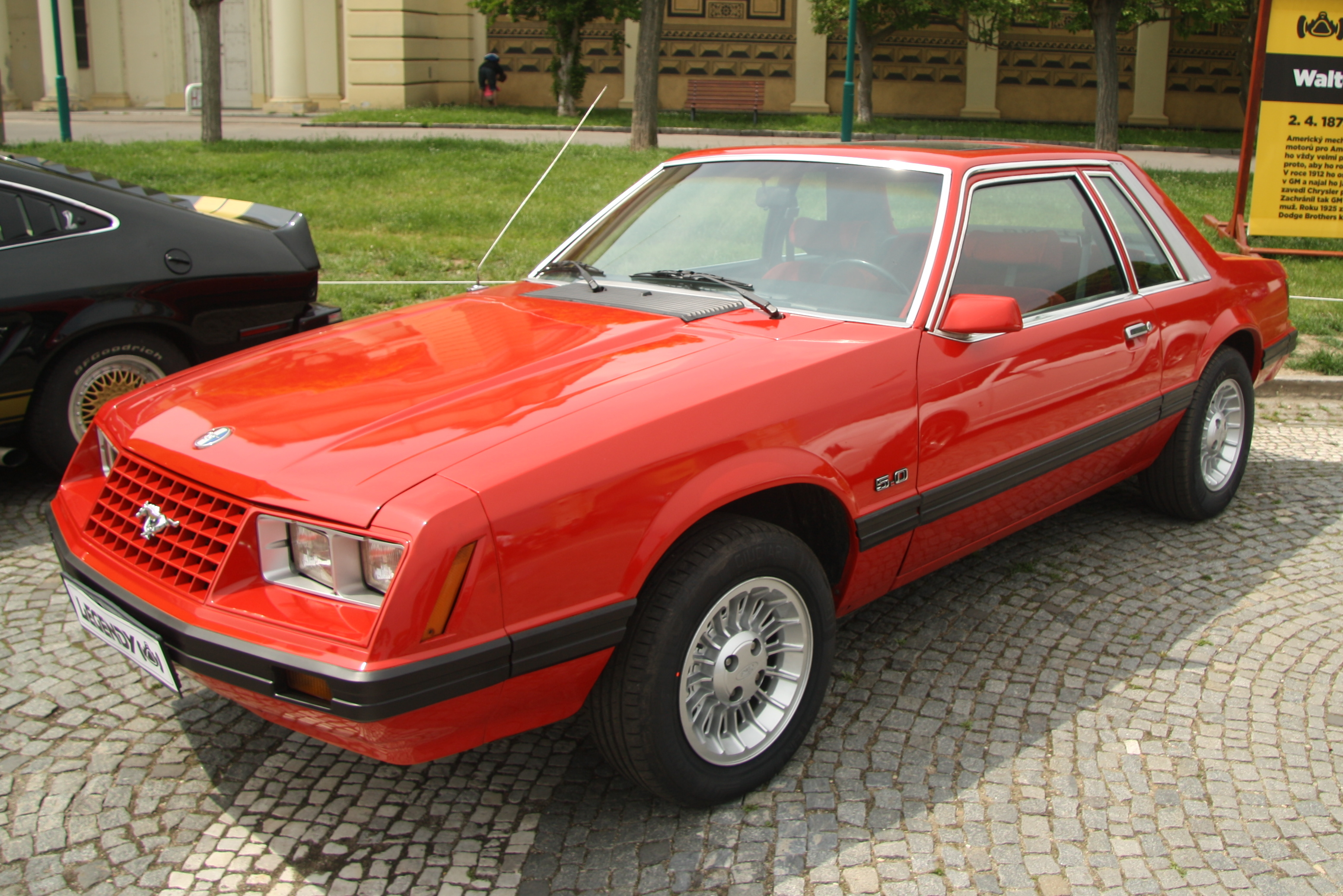
1979 Ford Mustang notchback coupe

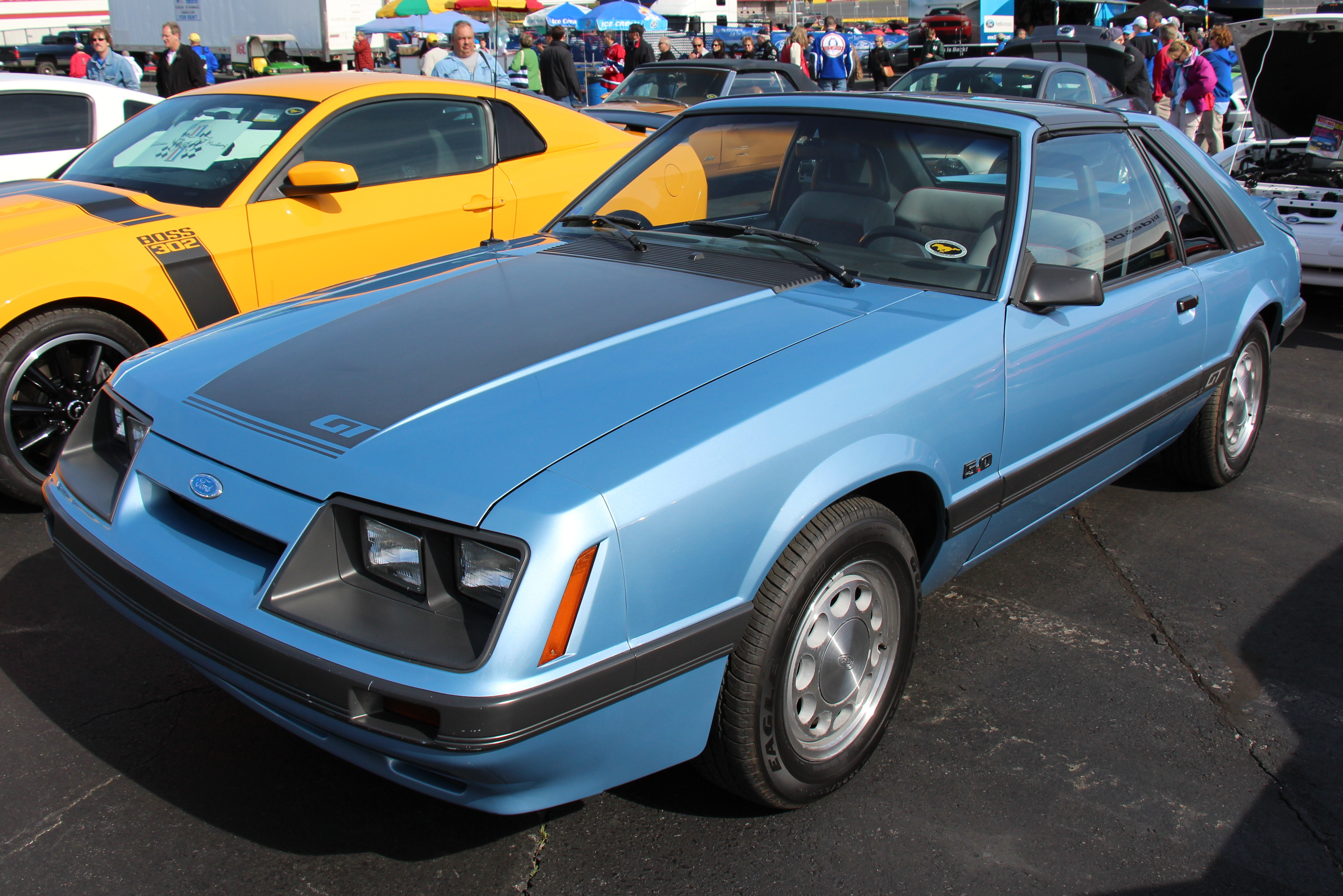
1985 GT hatchback

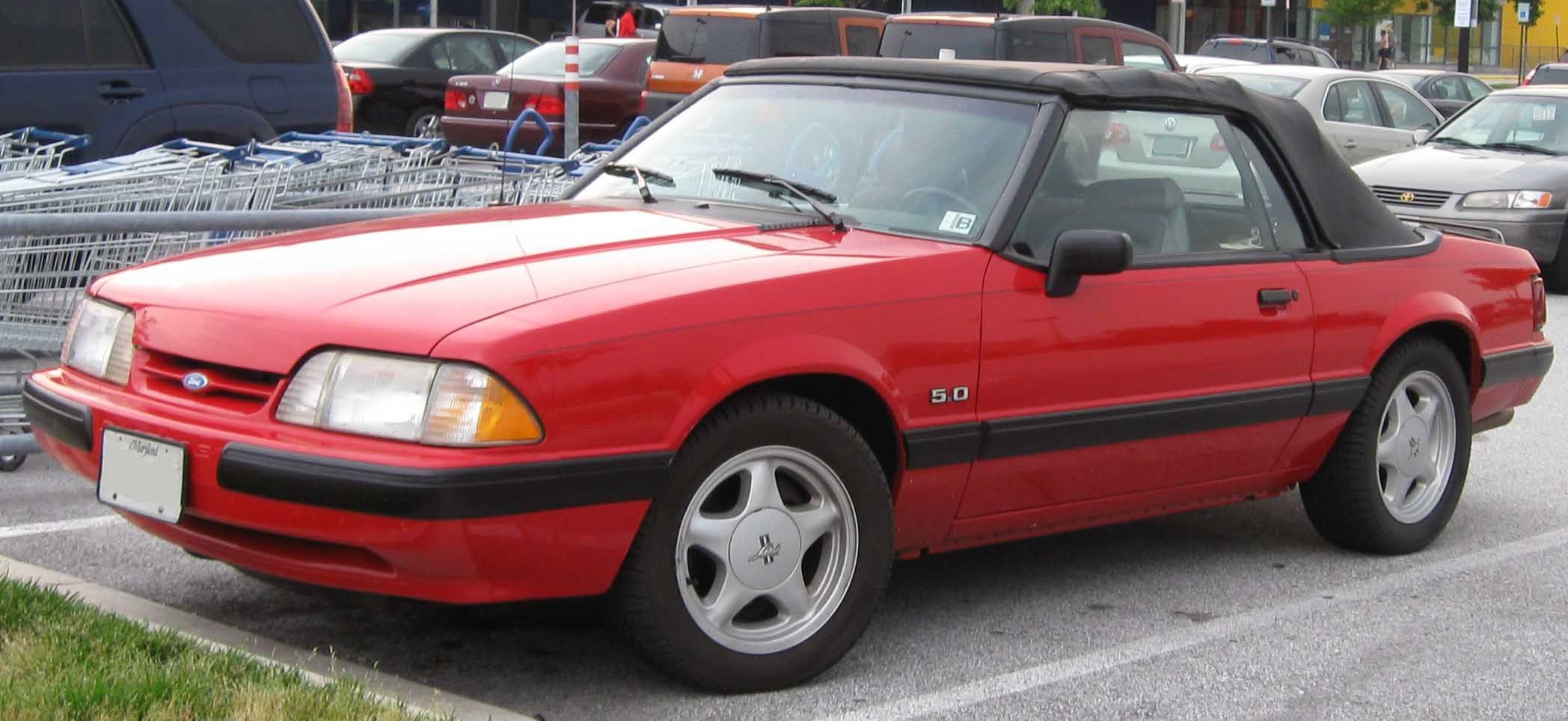
1987–1993 convertible

The 1979 Mustang was based on the larger Fox platform, initially developed for the 1978 Ford Fairmont and Mercury Zephyr. The larger four passenger body used a larger wheelbase which yielded increased room in the passenger cabin, trunk and engine bay.

Body styles included a coupe (or notchback), hatchback, and convertible, the latter added for model year 1983. Available trim levels included an unnamed base model (1979–1981), Ghia (1979–1981), Cobra (1979–1981, 1993), L (1982–1984), GL (1982–1983), GLX (1982–1983), GT (1982–1993), Turbo GT (1983–1984), LX (1984–1993), GT-350 20th anniversary edition (1984), SVO (1984–1986) and Cobra R (1993).

Engines and drivetrains carried over from the Mustang II including the 2.3 L I4, 2.8 L V6, and 4.9 L V8 engines. A troublesome 2.3 L turbocharged I4 was available during initial production startup and then reappeared after undergoing improvements for the mid-year introduction of the 1983 turbo GT. The 2.8 L V6, in short supply, was replaced with a 3.3 L I6 engine during the 1979 model year. That engine was ultimately replaced with a new 3.8 L V6 for 1983. The 302 cu in (4.9 L) V8 was suspended after 1979 and replaced with a smaller, 4.2 L V8 which was dropped in favor of the high output 302 cu in (4.9 L) V8 for 1982.

From 1979 to 1986, the Capri was domestically produced as a badge engineered variant of the Mustang, using a few of its own styling cues.

The third-generation Mustang had two different front-end styles. From 1979 to 1986, the front end was angled back using four rectangular headlights. The front end was restyled for 1987 to 1993 model years providing a rounded-off "aero" style with flush-composite headlamps and a smooth grille-less nose.

When the Mustang was selected as the 1979 Official Indianapolis 500 Pace Car, Ford also marketed replica models, and its special body-appearance parts were adapted by the Cobra package for 1980–81.

1982 marked the return of the Mustang GT (replacing the Cobra) which used a specially-modified high-output 302 cu in (4.9 L) engine.

In 1983, Ford again offered a convertible Mustang, after a nine-year absence. The front fascias of all Mustangs were restyled, featuring new grilles, sporting "blue oval" Ford emblems for the first time.

1984 introduced the high-performance Mustang SVO, which featured a 2.3 L turbocharged and intercooled four-cylinder engine and unique bodywork.

The Mustang celebrated its 20th anniversary with a special GT350 model in white with red interior and red lower-bodyside rocker stripes. 1985 Mustangs received another front-fascia restyle.

In response to poor sales and escalating fuel prices during the early 1980s, a new Mustang was in development. It was to be a variant of the Mazda MX-6 assembled at AutoAlliance International in Flat Rock, Michigan. Enthusiasts wrote to Ford objecting to the proposed change to a front-wheel drive, Japanese-designed Mustang without a V8 option. The result was the continuation of the existing Mustang while the Mazda MX-6 variant had a last-minute name change from Mustang to Probe and was released as a 1989 model.

The Mustang received a major restyling for 1987, including the interior, which carried it through the end of the 1993 model year.

Under the newly established Ford SVT division, the 1993 Ford Mustang SVT Cobra and Cobra R were added as special, high-performance models.

== Fourth generation (SN95; 1994) ==
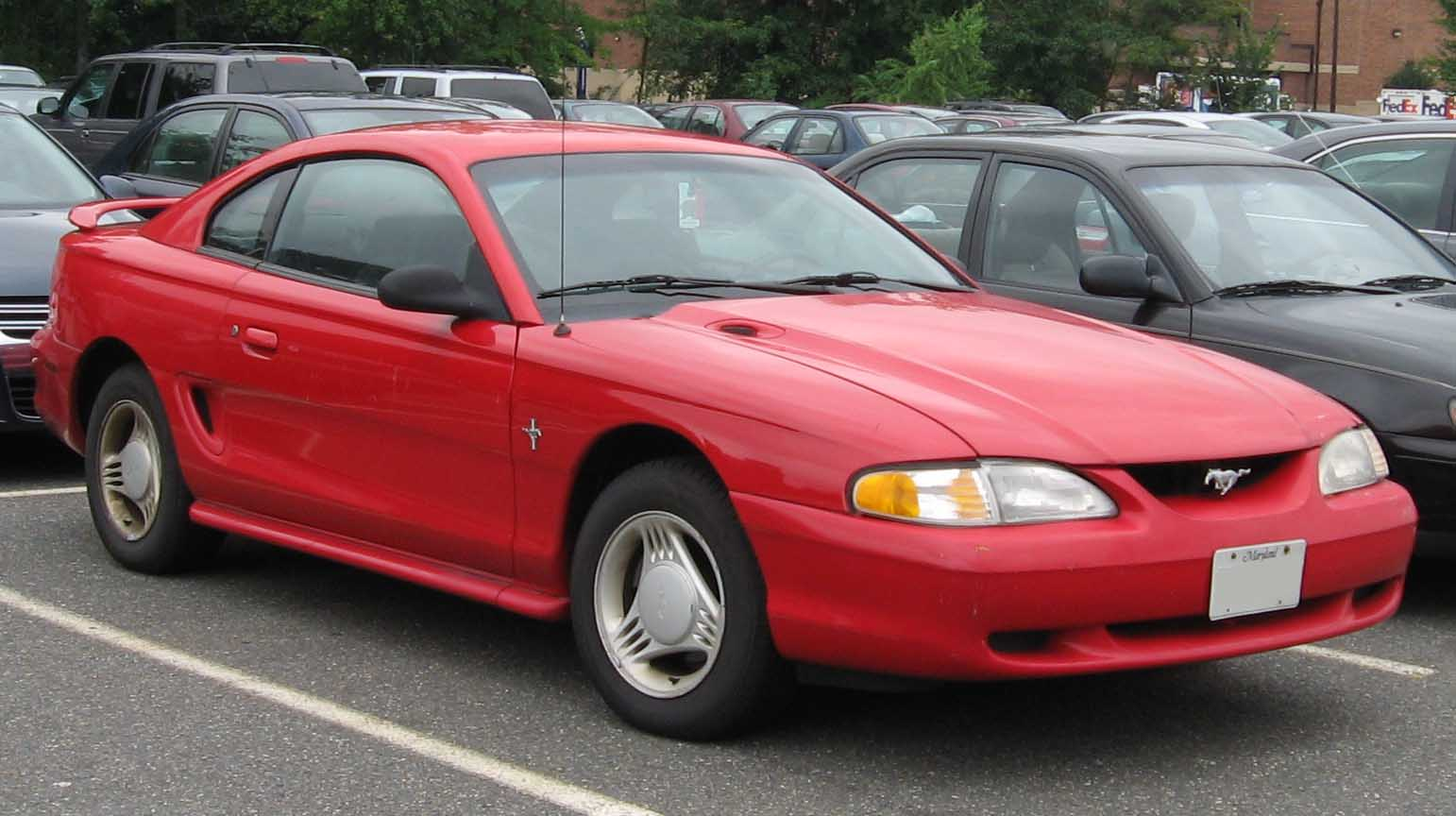
1994–1998 coupe

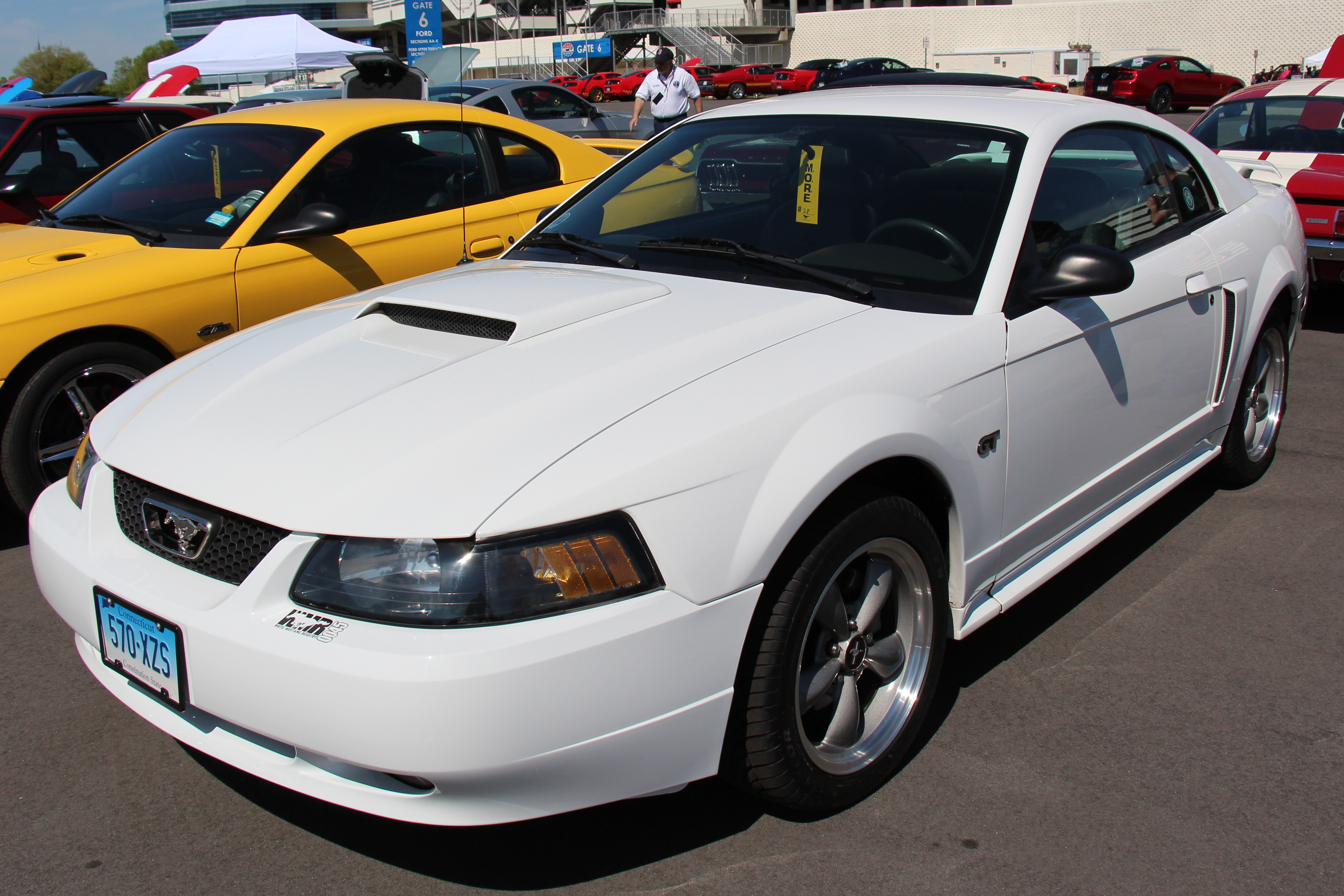
1999–2004 GT

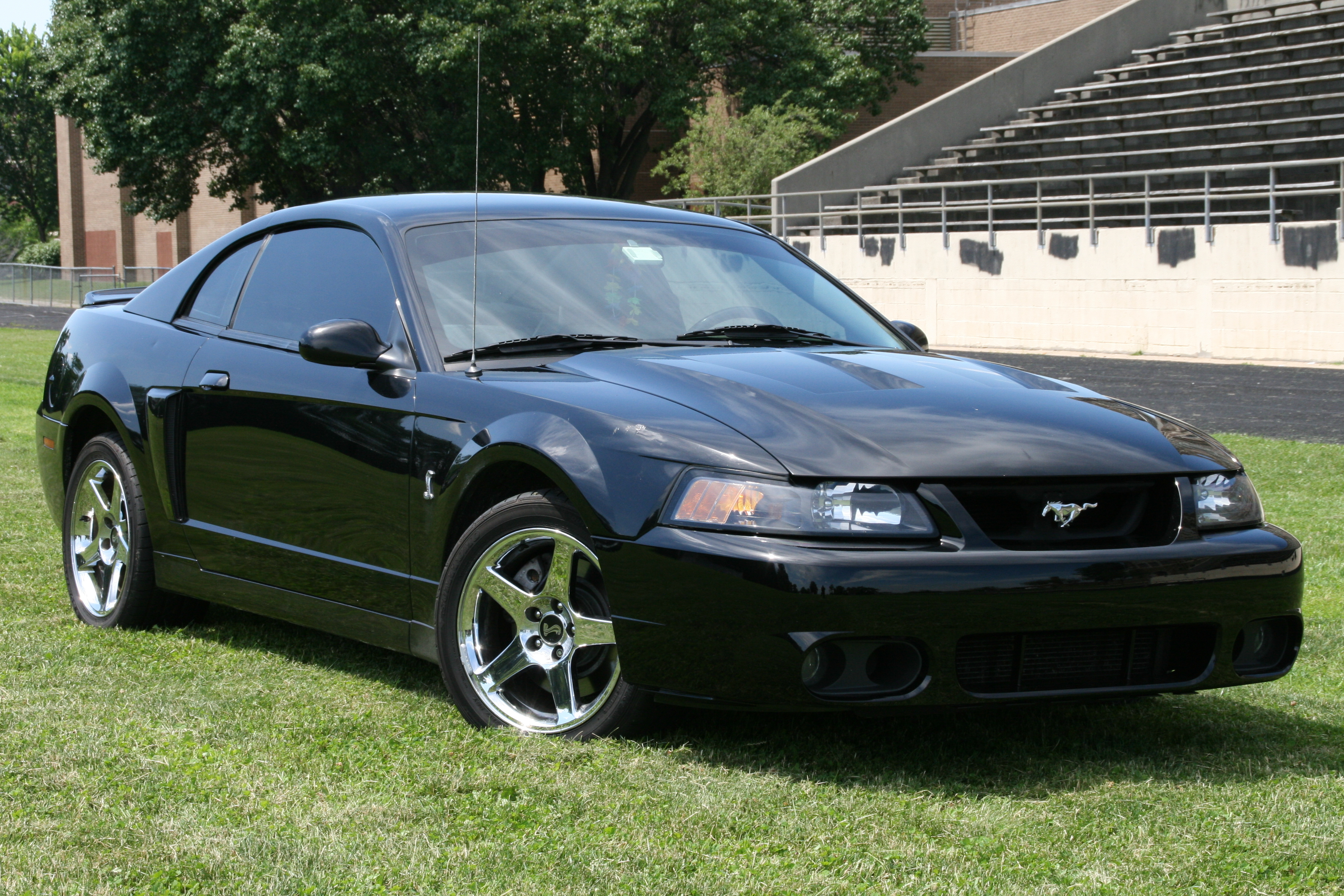
2004 Ford Mustang Cobra

In November 1993, the Mustang debuted its first major redesign in fifteen years. Code-named "SN95" by the automaker, it was based on an updated version of the rear-wheel drive Fox platform called "Fox-4." The new styling by Patrick Schiavone incorporated several styling cues from earlier Mustangs. For the first time since its introduction 1964, a notchback coupe model was not available. The door windows on the coupe were once again frameless; however, the car had a fixed "B" pillar and rear windows.

The base model came with a 3.8 OHV V6 3.8 L (232 cu in) engine rated at 145 bhp (108 kW) in 1994 and 1995, or 150 bhp (110 kW) (1996–1998), and was mated to a standard 5-speed manual transmission or optional 4-speed automatic. Though initially used in the 1994 and 1995 Mustang GTS, GT and Cobra, Ford retired the 302 cid pushrod small-block V8 after nearly 30 years of use, replacing it with the newer Modular 4.6 L (281 cu in) SOHC V8 in the 1996 Mustang GT. The 4.6 L V8 was initially rated at 215 bhp (160 kW), 1996–1997, but was later increased to 225 bhp (168 kW) in 1998.

For 1999, the Mustang was reskinned with Ford's New Edge styling theme with sharper contours, larger wheel arches, and creases in its bodywork, but its basic proportions, interior design, and chassis remained the same as the previous model. The Mustang's powertrains were carried over for 1999, but benefited from new improvements. The standard 3.8 L V6 had a new split-port induction system, and was rated at 190 bhp (140 kW) 1999–2000, while the Mustang GT's 4.6 L V8 saw an increase in output to 260 bhp (190 kW) (1999–2004), due to a new head design and other enhancements. In 2001, the 3.8 L was increased to 193 bhp. In 2004, a 3.9 L variant of the Essex engine replaced the standard 3.8 L mid year with an increase of 3 ft⋅lb (4 N⋅m) of torque as well as NVH improvements. There were also three alternate models offered in this generation: the 2001 Bullitt, the 2003 and 2004 Mach 1, as well as the 320 bhp (240 kW) 1999 and 2001, and 390 bhp (290 kW) 2003 and 2004 Cobra.

Ford Australia

This generation was sold in Australia between 2001 and 2002, to compete against the Holden Monaro (which eventually became the basis for the reborn Pontiac GTO). Due to the fact that the Mustang was never designed for right-hand-drive, Ford Australia contracted Tickford Vehicle Engineering to convert 250 Mustangs and modify them to meet Australian Design Rules per year. The development cost for redesigning the components and setting up the production process was A$4,000,000. Sales did not meet expectations, due in part to a high selling price. In total, just 377 Mustangs were sold in Australia between 2001 and 2003. For promotional purposes, Ford Racing Australia also built a Mustang V10 convertible, which was powered by a Ford Modular 6.8 L V10 engine from the American F truck series but fitted with an Australian-made Sprintex supercharger.

== Fifth generation (S197; 2005) ==
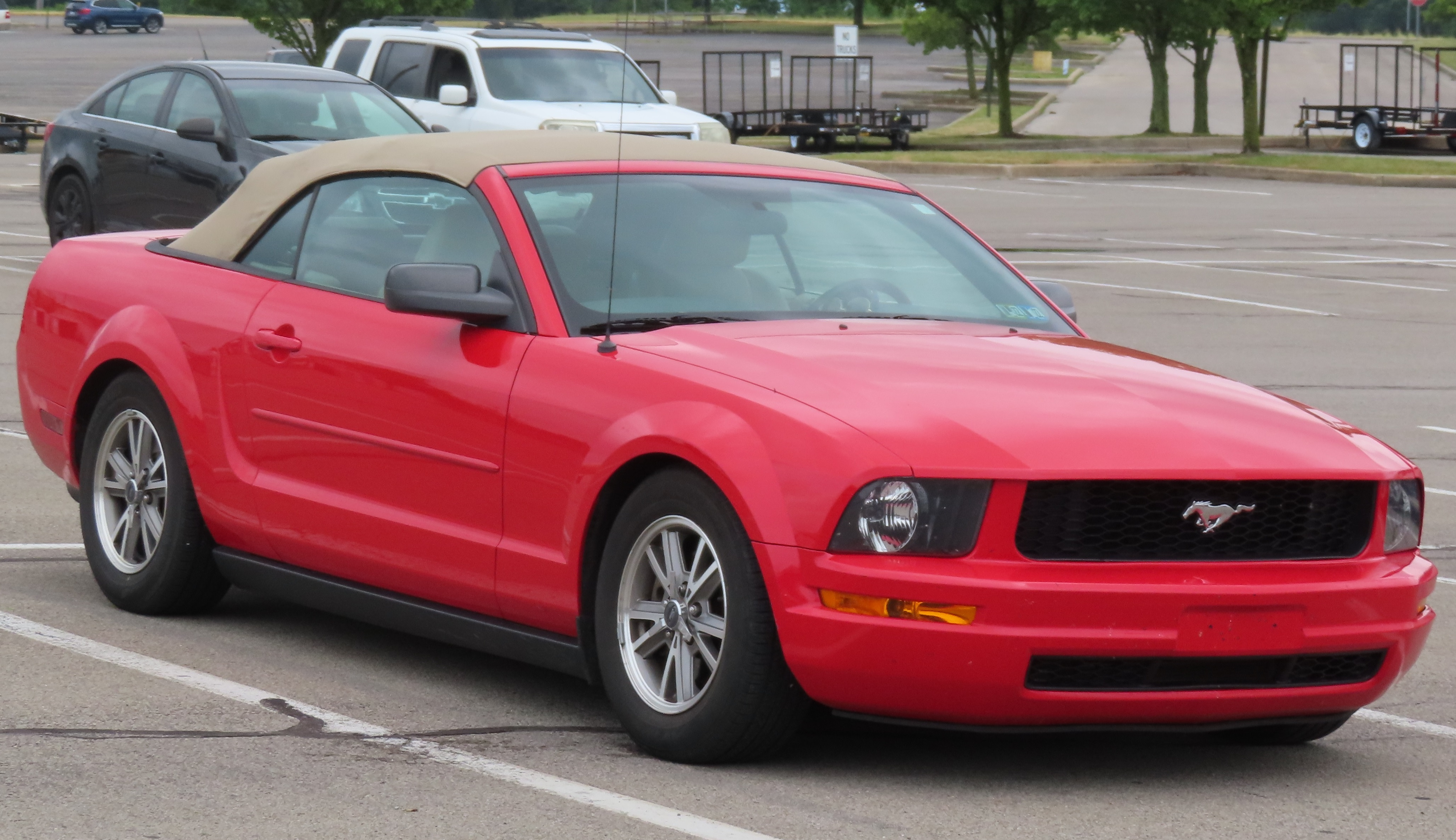
2005 V6 Premium convertible

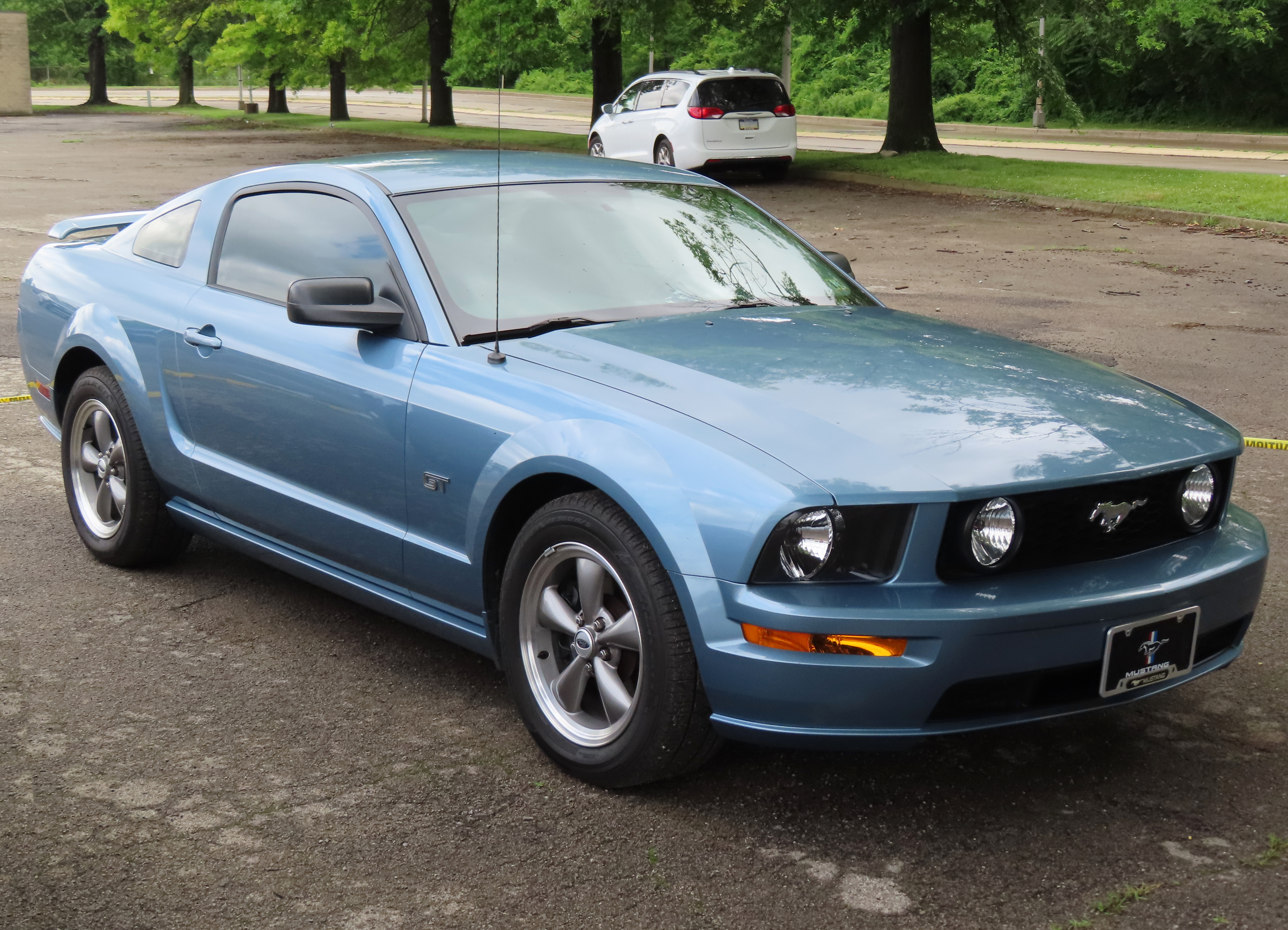
2005 GT

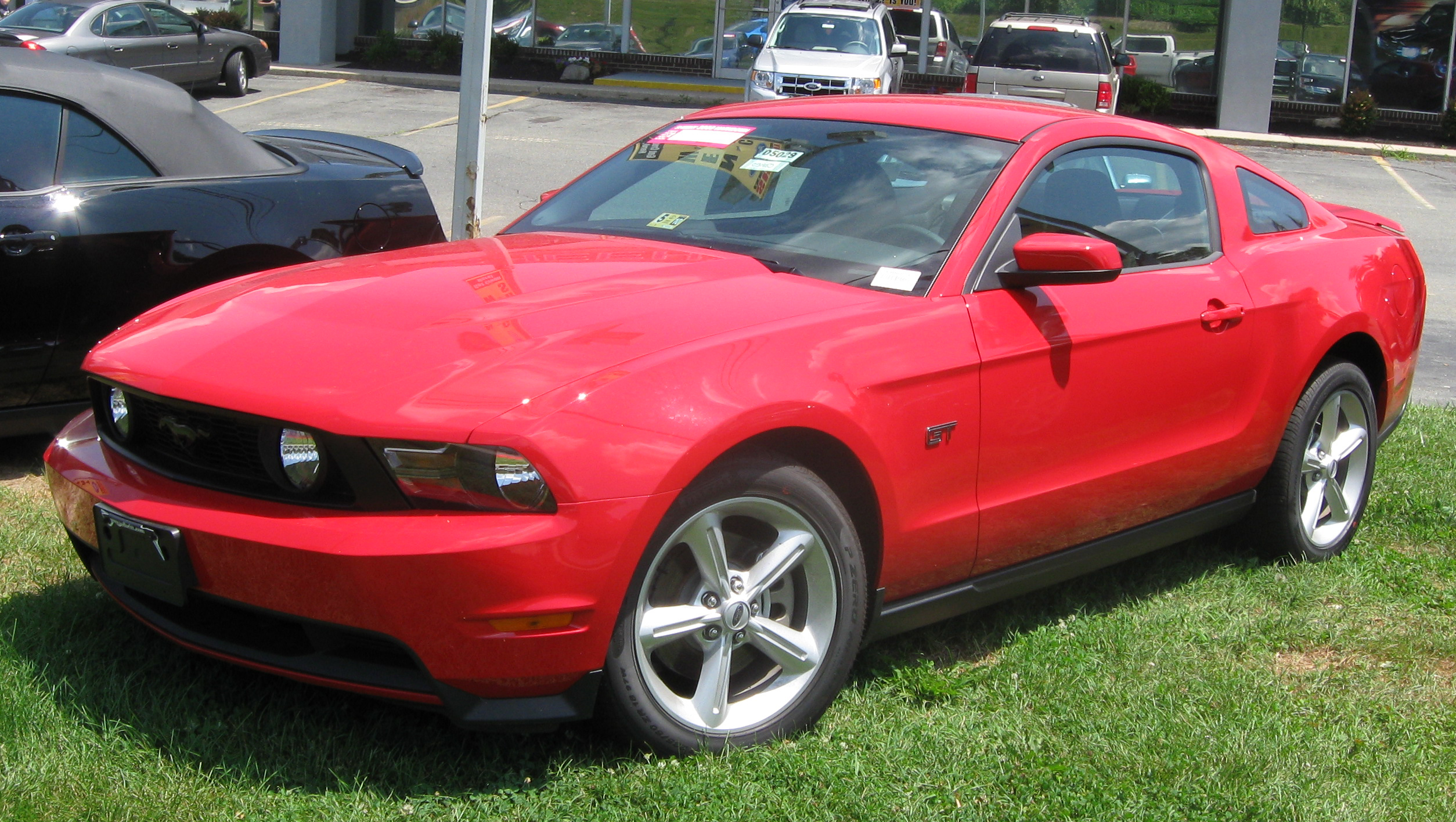
2010 GT

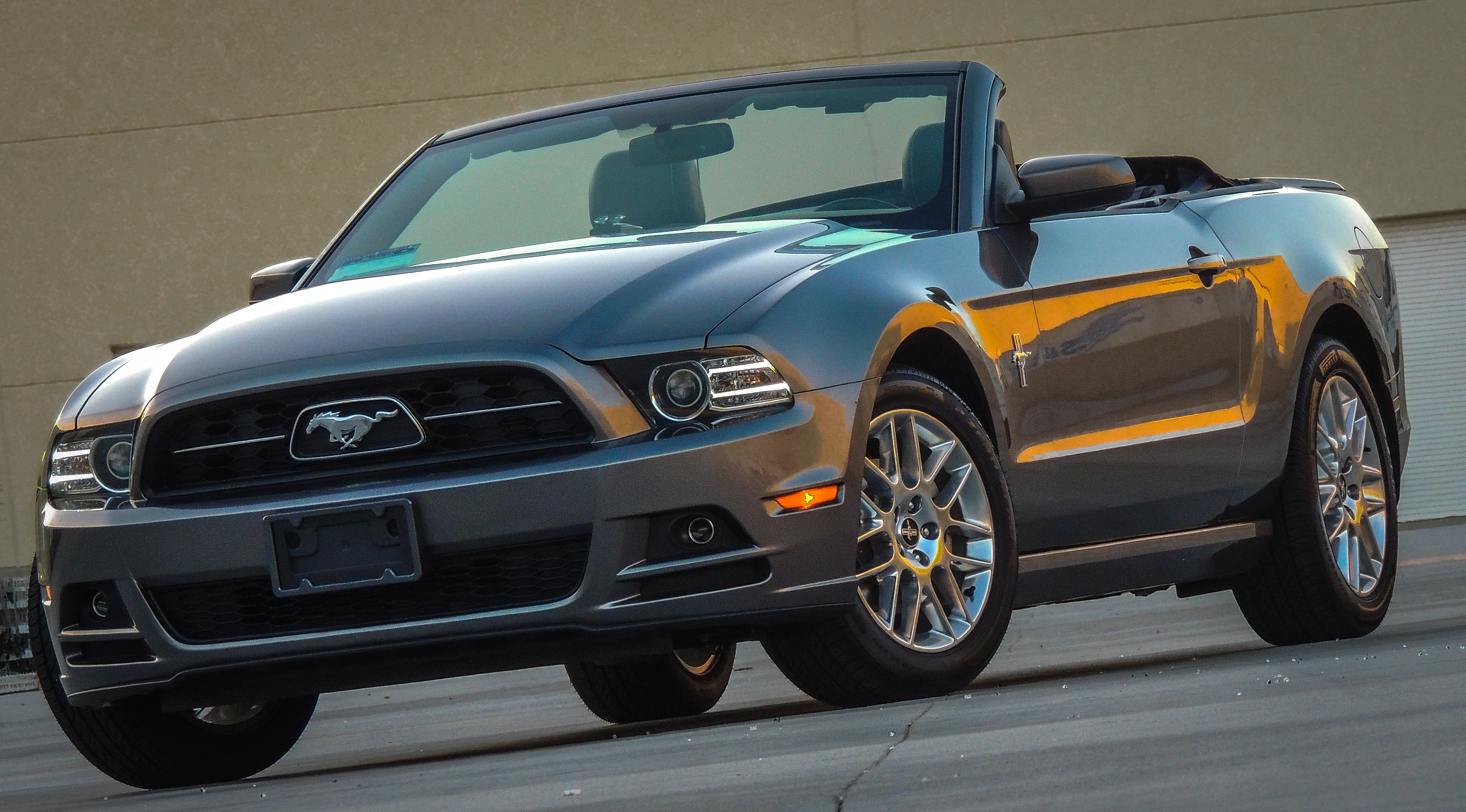
2014 convertible

Ford introduced a re-designed 2005 model year Mustang at the 2004 North American International Auto Show, codenamed "S197", that was based on the new D2C platform. Developed under the direction of chief engineer Hau Thai-Tang, a veteran engineer for Ford's IndyCar program under Mario Andretti, and exterior styling designer Sid Ramnarace, the fifth-generation Mustang's styling echoes the fastback Mustang models of the late-1960s. Ford's senior vice president of design, J Mays, called it "retro-futurism". The fifth-generation Mustang was manufactured at the Flat Rock Assembly Plant in Flat Rock, Michigan.

For the 2005 to 2010 production years, the base model was powered by a 210 hp (157 kW; 213 PS) cast-iron block 4.0 L SOHC V6, while the GT used an aluminum block 4.6 L SOHC three-valve Modular V8 with variable camshaft timing (VCT) that produced 300 hp (224 kW; 304 PS). Base models had Tremec T5 five-speed manual transmissions with Ford's 5R55S five-speed automatic being optional. Automatic GTs also featured this, but manual GTs had the Tremec TR-3650 five-speeds.

For 2007, Ford's SVT launched the Shelby GT500, a successor to the 2003/2004 Mustang SVT Cobra. The supercharged and intercooled Ford Modular 5,408 cc (5.4 L; 330.0 cu in) DOHC 4 valves per cylinder V8 engine with an iron block and aluminum heads was rated at 500 hp (507 PS; 373 kW) at 6,000 rpm and 480 lb⋅ft (651 N⋅m) of torque at 4,500 rpm.

The 2010 model year Mustang was released in the spring of 2009 with a redesigned exterior—which included sequential LED taillights—and a reduced drag coefficient of 4% on base models and 7% on GT models. The engine for base Mustangs remained unchanged, while the GT's 4.6 L V8 was revised resulting in 315 hp (235 kW; 319 PS) at 6,000 rpm and 325 lb⋅ft (441 N⋅m) of torque at 4,255 rpm. Other mechanical features included new spring rates and dampers, traction and stability control system standard on all models, and new wheel sizes.

Engines were revised for 2011, and transmission options included the Getrag-Ford MT82 six-speed manual or the 6R80 six-speed automatic based on the ZF 6HP26 transmission, licensed for production by Ford. Electric power steering replaced the conventional hydraulic version. A new 3.72 L (227 cu in) aluminum block V6 engine weighed 40 lb (18 kg) less than the previous version. With 24 valves and twin independent variable cam timing (TiVCT), it produced 305 hp (227 kW; 309 PS) and 280 lb⋅ft (380 N⋅m) of torque. The 3.7 L engine came with a new dual exhaust. GT models included 32-valve 5.0 L engine (4,951 cc (302.13 cu in)) (also referred to as the "Coyote") producing 412 hp and 390 ft-lbs of torque. Brembo brakes were optional along with 19-inch wheels and performance tires.

For 2012, a new Mustang Boss 302 version was introduced. The engine had 444 hp (331 kW; 450 PS) and 380 lb⋅ft (520 N⋅m) of torque. A "Laguna Seca" edition was also available, which offered additional body bracing, the replacement of the rear seat with a steel "X-brace" for stiffening, and other powertrain and handling enhancements.

In the second quarter of 2012, Ford launched an update to the Mustang line as an early 2013 model. The Shelby GT500 had a new 5.8 L supercharged V8 producing 662 hp (494 kW; 671 PS). The Shelby and Boss engines came with a six-speed manual transmission. The GT and V6 models revised styling incorporated the grille and air intakes from the 2010–2012 GT500s. The decklid received a black cosmetic panel on all trim levels. The GT's 5.0 liter V8 gained eight horsepower from 412 hp (307 kW; 418 PS) to 420 hp (313 kW; 426 PS).

== Sixth generation (S550; 2015) ==
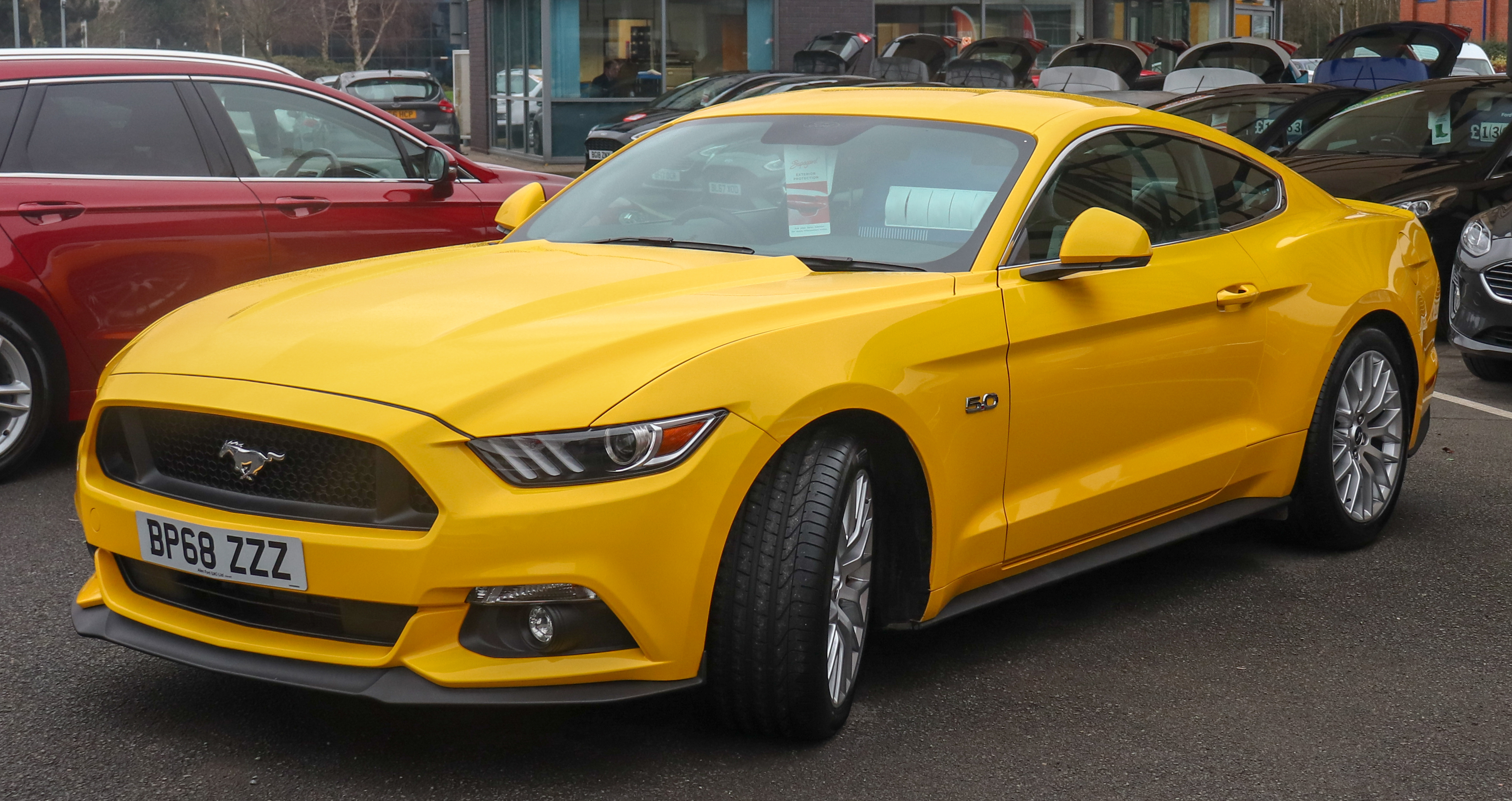
Sixth generation Ford Mustang GT (export model)

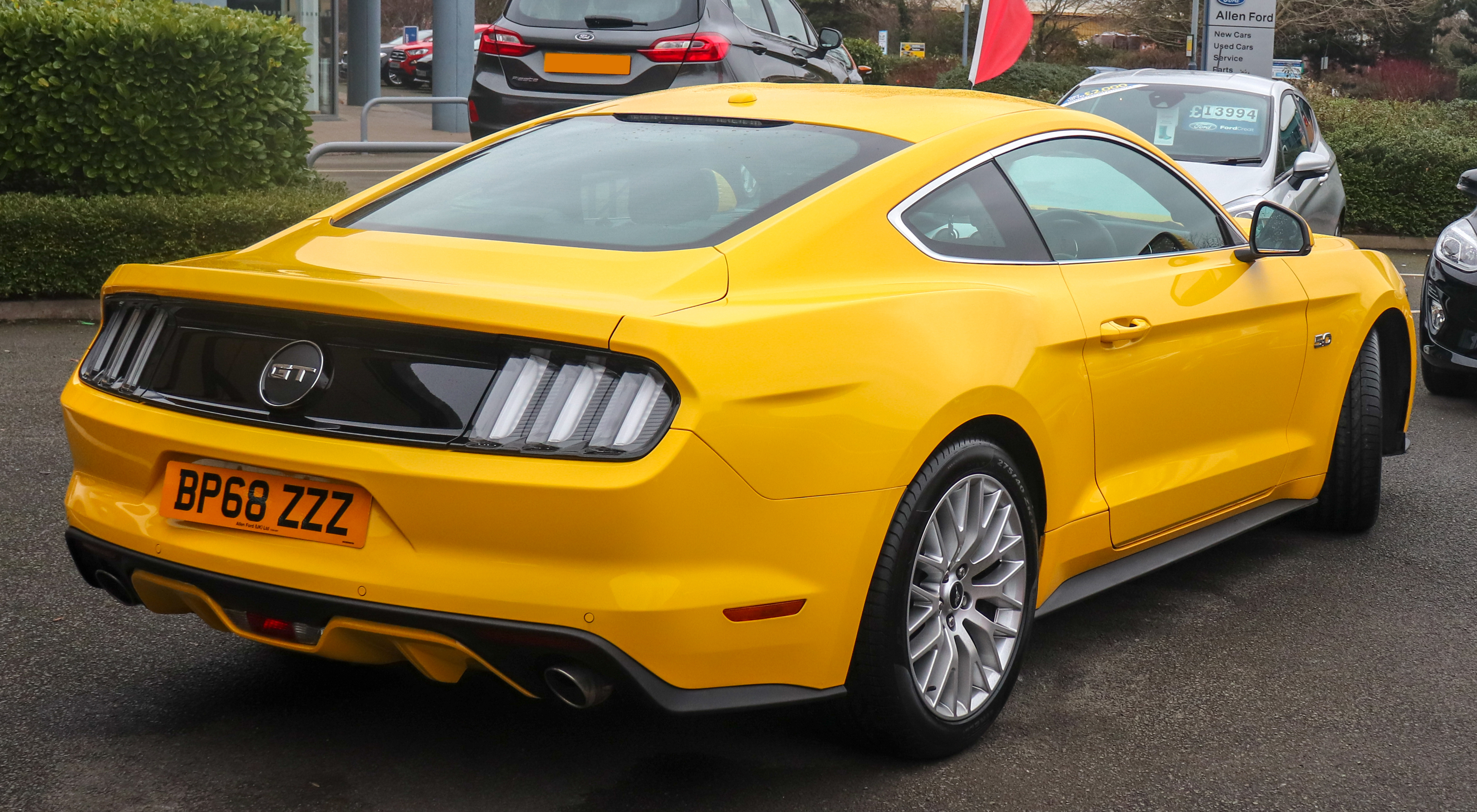
Sixth generation Ford Mustang GT (export model)

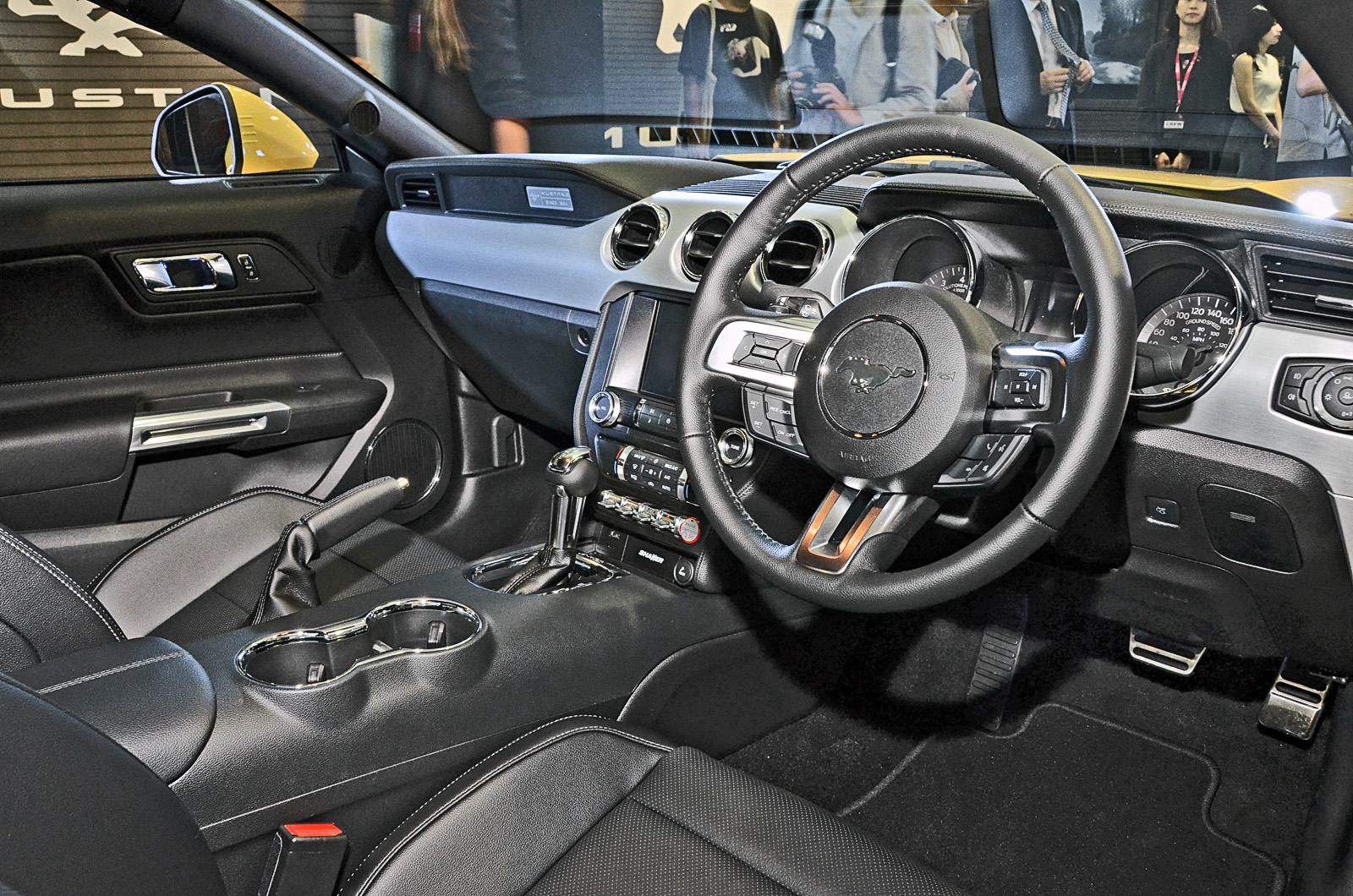
Export model interior right-hand drive

The sixth generation Mustang was unveiled on December 5, 2013, in Dearborn, Michigan; New York, New York; Los Angeles, California; Barcelona, Spain; Shanghai, China; and Sydney, Australia. The internal project code name is S550.

Changes include a body widened by 1.5 inches and lowered 1.4 inches, a trapezoidal grille, and a 2.75-inch lower decklid, as well as new colors. The passenger volume is increased to 84.5 cubic feet, the wheelbase is still 8 ft. 11.1 in. (107.1 in.), and three engine options are available: a newly developed 2.3 L EcoBoost 310 hp four-cylinder introduced to reach high tariff global markets like China, 3.7 L 300 hp V6, or 5.0 L Coyote 435 hp V8, with either a Getrag six-speed manual or six-speed automatic transmission with paddle shifters.

A new independent rear suspension (IRS) system was developed specifically for the new model. It also became the first version factory designed as a right hand drive export model to be sold overseas through Ford new car dealerships in right hand drive markets. During this model year, left hand drive versions were expanded to new export markets.

In February 2015, the Mustang earned a five-star rating from the National Highway Traffic Safety Administration (NHTSA) for front, side, and rollover crash protection.

In May 2015, Ford issued a recall involving 19,486 of the 2015 Ford Mustang with the 2.3 L EcoBoost turbocharged four-cylinder engine with a production date between February 14, 2014, and February 10, 2015, that were built at the Flat Rock Assembly Plant. As of June 2015, 1 million Mustangs (between 2005 and 2011) and GTs (between 2005 and 2006) were affected by a recall of airbags made by Takata Corporation. This was after Takata announced that it was recalling 33.8 million vehicles in the U.S. for airbags that could explode and send metal pieces flying at drivers and passengers.

Euro NCAP crash-tested the left hand drive (LHD) European version of the 2017 Mustang which received only two stars due to the lack of auto safety features such as lane assist and auto braking. Euro NCAP also pointed to insufficient pressure of the Airbag resulting in the driver's head hitting the steering wheel. In the full-width test, the rear passenger slipped under the seatbelt.

The 2018 model year Mustang was released in the third quarter of 2017 in North America and by 2018 globally. It featured a minor redesign to the exterior. The 2018 Mustang engine line up was revised. The 3.7 L V6 was dropped and the 2.3 L I4 Ecoboost (direct-injection turbocharged) engine now serves as the base power plant for the Mustang, producing 310 hp (231 kW) and 350 lb⋅ft (475 N⋅m) of torque when using 93-octane fuel. The 5.0 L V8 gets a power increase to 460 hp (343 kW) and 420 lb⋅ft (569 N⋅m) of torque. The automatic transmission in both engines is now a ten-speed Ford 10R80. In January 2018, Ford displayed a prototype of the special edition 2018 Bullitt model, to be released in the summer; this vehicle commemorated the 50th anniversary of the movie Bullitt that helped attract interest in the marque.

For the 2019 model year, Ford revised many components on the 2019 Shelby GT350 including stickier Michelin Pilot Sport Cup 2 tires along with steering and suspension components.

The 2020 model year saw the re-introduction of the GT500. The 2020 GT500 includes a hand-built 5.2-liter "Predator" aluminum-alloy V8 engine with a 2.65-liter roots-type supercharger. The Shelby GT500 produces 760 hp (567 kW; 771 PS) and 625 lb⋅ft (847 N⋅m) of torque. The GT350 was discontinued at the end of the 2020 model year.

For the 2021 model year, Ford re-introduced the Mach 1 after a 17-year hiatus. The 2021 Mach 1 utilizes the current Coyote 5.0 L engine with GT350 parts, including the intake manifold, increasing performance to 480 hp (358 kW) at 7,000 rpm and 420 lb⋅ft (569 N⋅m) at 4,600 rpm in addition to utilizing the GT350's lightweight Tremec six-speed manual transmission, oil-filter adapter, engine oil cooler, and front and rear subframe. The Mach 1 also utilizes parts from the GT500, including the rear axle cooling system, rear toe link, and rear diffuser.

== Seventh generation (S650; 2024) ==
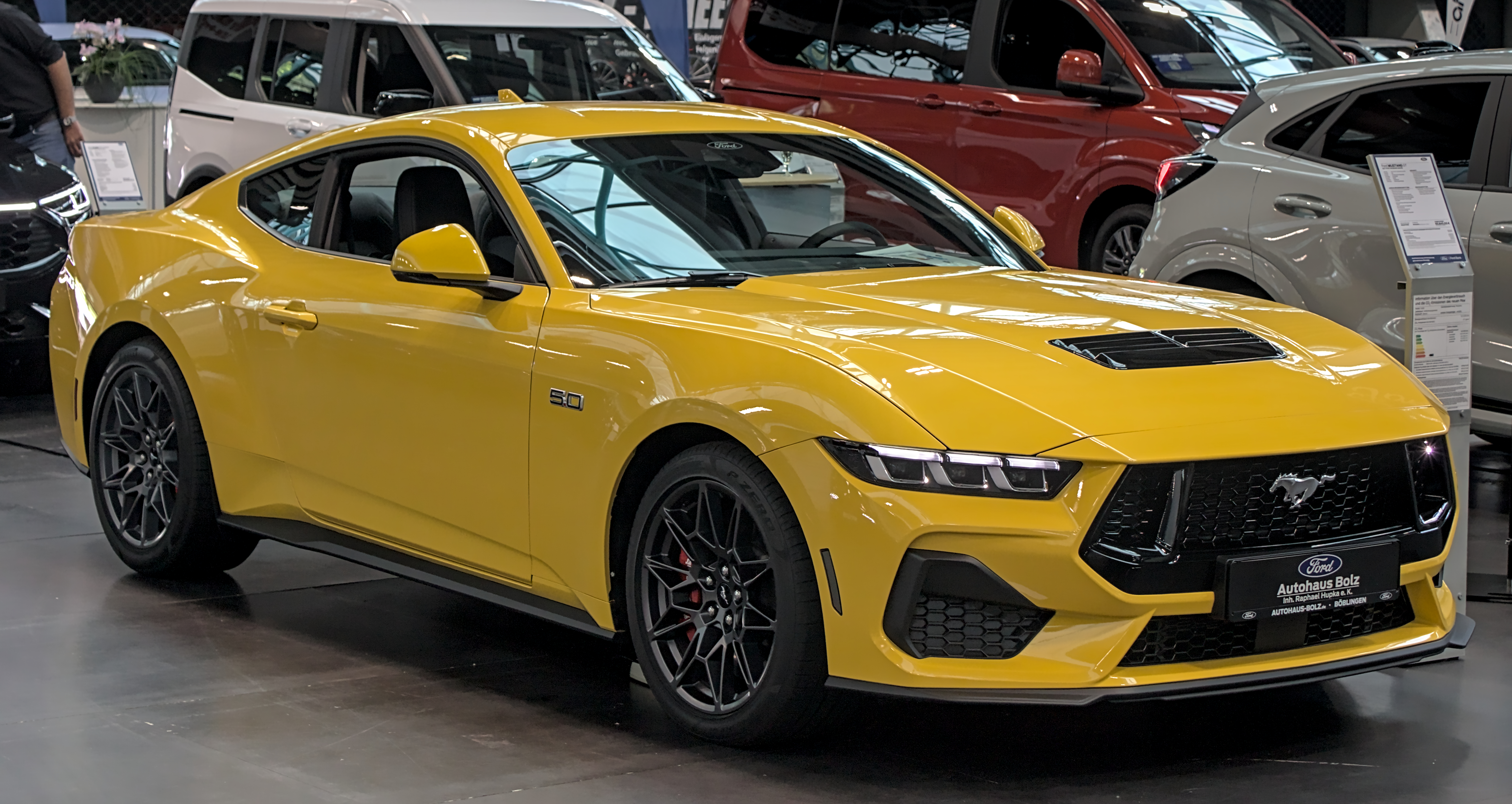
2024 Mustang

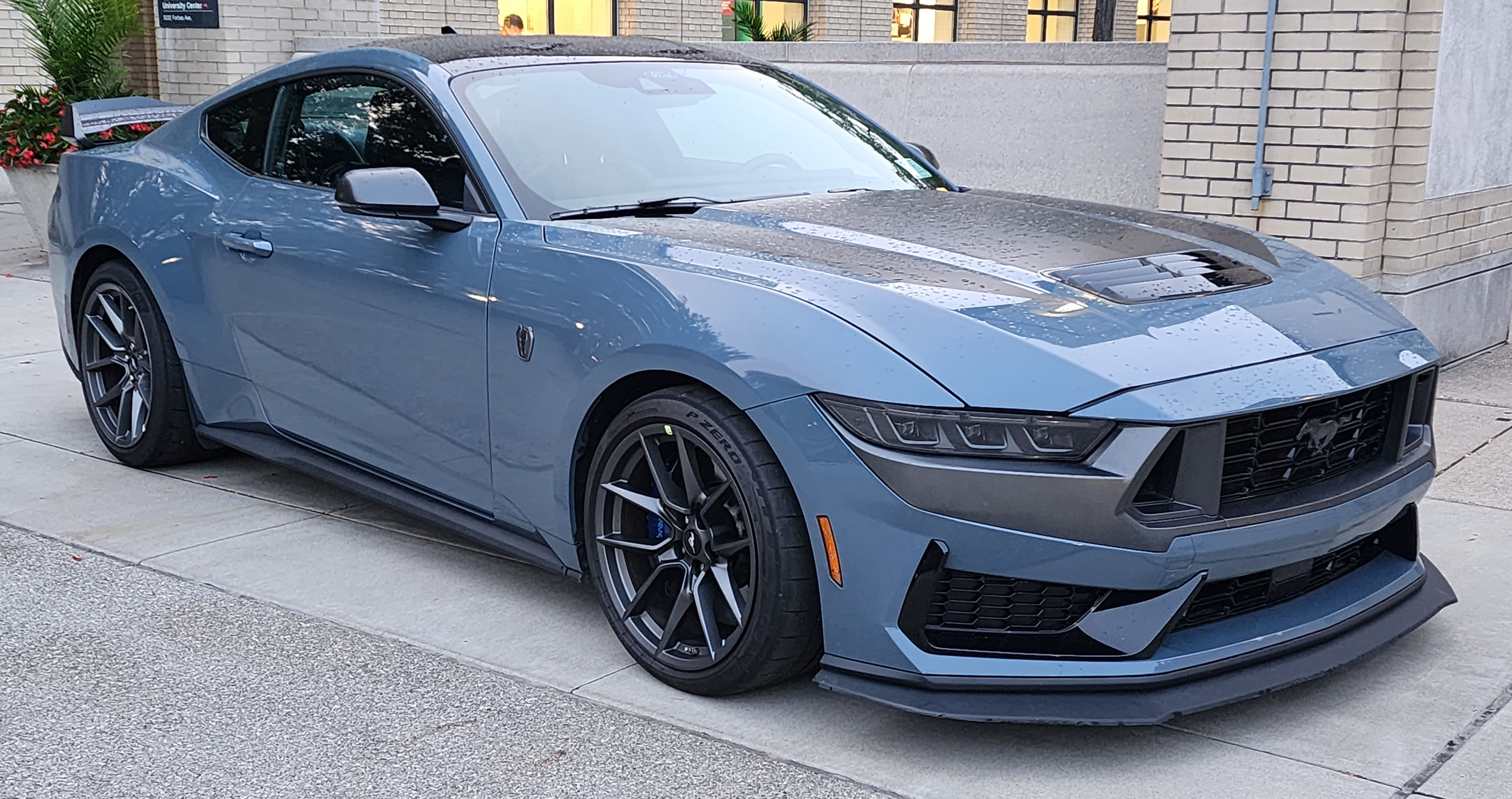
Dark Horse

Ford previewed the seventh-generation Mustang at the 2022 Detroit Auto Show on September 14, in a special event called "The Stampede". As part of its introduction, multiple track-only models were showcased, such as a NASCAR Cup Series body, a V8 Supercar version, and multiple GT racing versions, among others. Also announced was the addition of the "Dark Horse" series. Bridging the gap between the Mach 1 and now-discontinued GT350, the Dark Horse performs much the same role as the 2012–2013 Boss 302 Mustangs—a street legal car with enhanced performance on road courses. The seventh generation Mustang is assembled at Ford's Flat Rock Assembly Plant and began production on May 1, 2023, initially available with either the redesigned 2.3 L EcoBoost turbocharged 4-cylinder with 315 hp (235 kW), or the revised, 4th generation Coyote V8 with 480–486 hp (358–362 kW) in the GT and 500 hp (373 kW) in the Dark Horse. At launch, three transmissions were offered: a Getrag 6-speed manual (GT only), a Tremec 6-speed manual transmission (Dark Horse only), or a 10-speed automatic transmission (available on all trims). A supercharged, track-focused variant of the Mustang Dark Horse, known as the Dark Horse SC, was unveiled on January 15, 2026.

== Mustang Mach-E ==
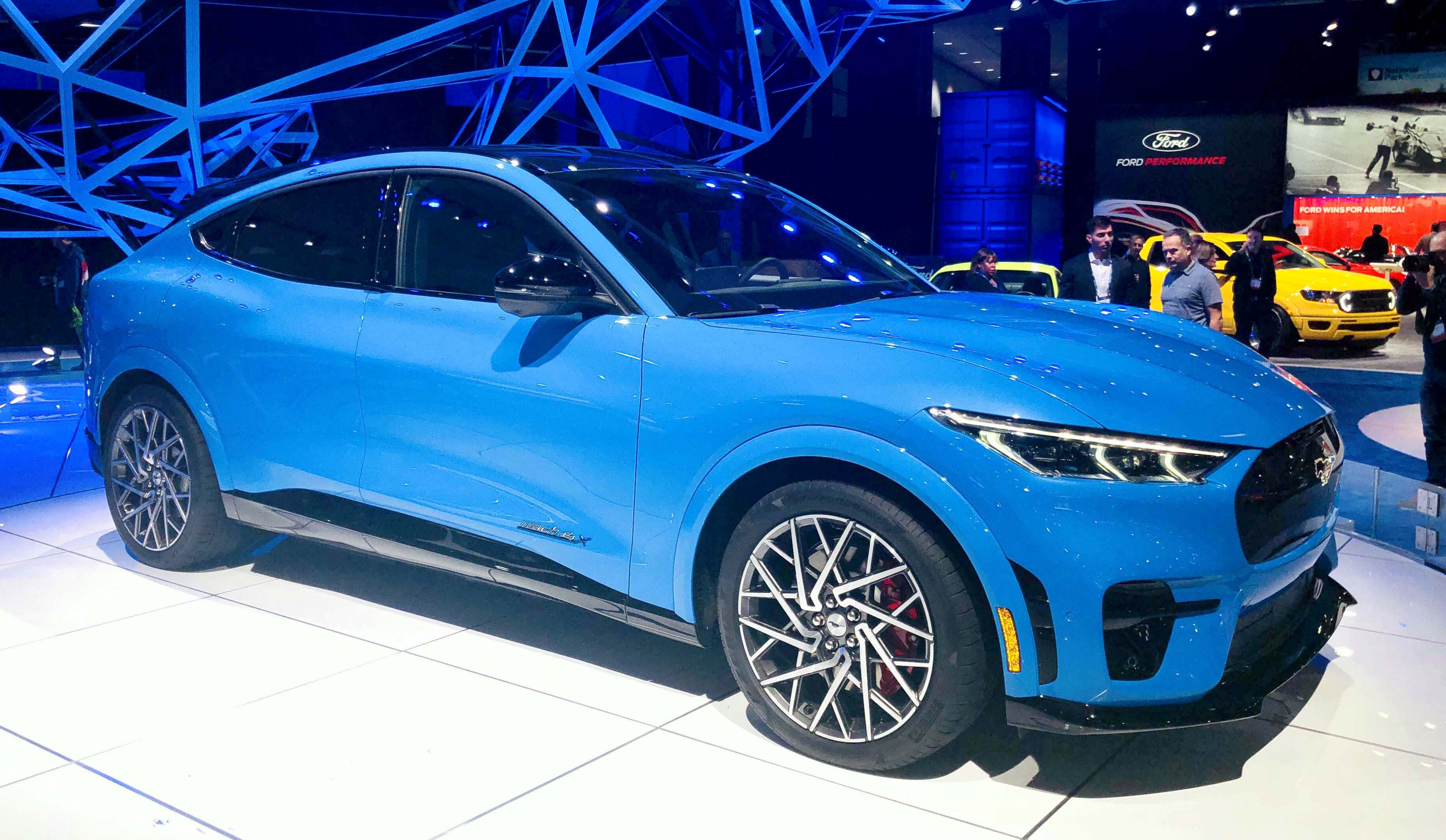
Ford Mustang Mach-E GT at the 2019 LA Auto Show

On November 17, 2019, Ford announced the Ford Mustang Mach-E. Unrelated to any of the pony car Mustang versions, it is an electric crossover with rear-wheel or all-wheel drive, depending on trim level. It has 210–375 miles (340–605 km) of range and an updated Ford Sync system with a 15.5 inch display. The Mustang Mach-E comes in several different trims including First Edition, Select, Premium, California Route 1, and GT. The Mach-E also offers two battery options, and Ford is expected to introduce a third option in the future. Although it shares the Mustang name and badge, this vehicle is not counted among the Mustang's seven generations, as it is a separate model produced alongside the existing two-door Mustang rather than being a chronological successor to it, and is designed around a separate vehicle platform.

== Racing ==
The Mustang made its first public appearance on a racetrack as pace car for the 1964 Indianapolis 500.

The same year, Mustangs won first and second in class at the Tour de France international rally.

In 1969, modified versions of the 428 Mach 1, Boss 429 and Boss 302 took 295 United States Auto Club-certified records at Bonneville Salt Flats. The outing included a 24-hour run on a 10-mile (16 km) course at an average speed of 157 mph (253 km/h). Drivers were Mickey Thompson, Danny Ongais, Ray Brock, and Bob Ottum.

=== Drag racing ===
The car's American competition debut, also in 1964, was in drag racing, where private individuals and dealer-sponsored teams campaigned Mustangs powered by 427 cu in (7.0 L) V8s.

In late 1964, Ford contracted Holman & Moody to prepare ten 427-powered Mustangs to contest the National Hot Rod Association's (NHRA) A/Factory Experimental class in the 1965 drag racing season. Five of these special Mustangs made their competition debut at the 1965 NHRA Winternationals, where they qualified in the factory stock eliminator class. The car driven by Bill Lawton won the class.

A decade later Bob Glidden won the Mustang's first NHRA pro stock title.

Rickie Smith's Motorcraft Mustang won the International Hot Rod Association pro stock world championship.

In 2002, John Force broke his own NHRA drag racing record by winning his 12th national championship in his Ford Mustang funny car; Force beat that record again in 2006, becoming the first-ever 14-time champion, driving a Mustang.

=== Circuit racing ===
Early Mustangs also proved successful in road racing. The GT 350 R, the race version of the Shelby GT 350, won five of the Sports Car Club of America's (SCCA) six divisions in 1965. Drivers were Jerry Titus, Bob Johnson and Mark Donohue, and Titus won the (SCCA) B-Production national championship. The GT 350s won the B-Production title again in 1966 and 1967. They also won the 1966 manufacturers' championship in the inaugural SCCA Trans-Am series, and repeated the win the following year.

In 1970, Mustang won the SCCA series manufacturers' championship again, with Parnelli Jones and George Follmer driving for car owner/builder Bud Moore and crew chief Lanky Foushee. Jones won the "unofficial" drivers' title.

In 1975, Ron Smaldone's Mustang became the first-ever American car to win the Showroom Stock national championship in SCCA road racing.

Mustangs competed in the IMSA GTO class, with wins in 1984 and 1985. In 1985 John Jones won the 1985 GTO drivers' championship; Wally Dallenbach Jr., John Jones and Doc Bundy won the GTO class at the Daytona 24 Hours; and Ford won its first manufacturers' championship in road racing since 1970. Three class wins went to Lynn St. James, the first woman to win in the series.

1986 brought eight more GTO wins and another manufacturers' title. Scott Pruett won the drivers' championship. The GT Endurance Championship also went to Ford.

In 1987 Saleen Autosport Mustangs driven by Steve Saleen and Rick Titus won the SCCA Escort Endurance SSGT championship, and in International Motor Sports Association (IMSA) racing a Mustang again won the GTO class in the Daytona 24 Hours. In 1989, the Mustang won Ford its first Trans-Am manufacturers' title since 1970, with Dorsey Schroeder winning the drivers' championship.

In 1997, Tommy Kendall's Roush-prepared Mustang won a record 11 consecutive races in Trans-Am to secure his third straight driver's championship.

Mustangs compete in the SCCA World Challenge, with Brandon Davis winning the 2009 GT driver's championship. Mustangs competed in the now-defunct Grand-Am Road Racing Ford Racing Mustang Challenge for the Miller Cup series.

Ford won championships in the Grand-Am Road Racing Continental Tire Sports Car Challenge for the 2005, 2008, and 2009 seasons with the Mustang FR500C and GT models. In 2004, Ford Racing retained Multimatic Motorsports to design, engineer, build and race the Mustang FR500C turn-key race car. In 2005, Scott Maxwell and David Empringham took the driver's title. In 2010, the next-generation Mustang race car was known as the Boss 302R. It took its maiden victory at Barber Motorsports Park in early 2011, with drivers Scott Maxwell and Joe Foster.

In 2012, Jack Roush Jr and Billy Johnson won the Continental Tire Sports Car Challenge race at the Daytona International Speedway opening race of the 50th Anniversary Rolex 24 At Daytona weekend in a Mustang Boss 302R.

In 2016, Multimatic Motorsports won the IMSA CTSCC drivers' and manufacturers' titles with the S550-based Shelby GT350R-C, driven by Scott Maxwell and Billy Johnson.

On July 27, 2023, Ford announced that the 7th Generation Mustang would have its own spec-racing series called Mustang Challenge, sanctioned by the IMSA.

=== Stock car racing ===
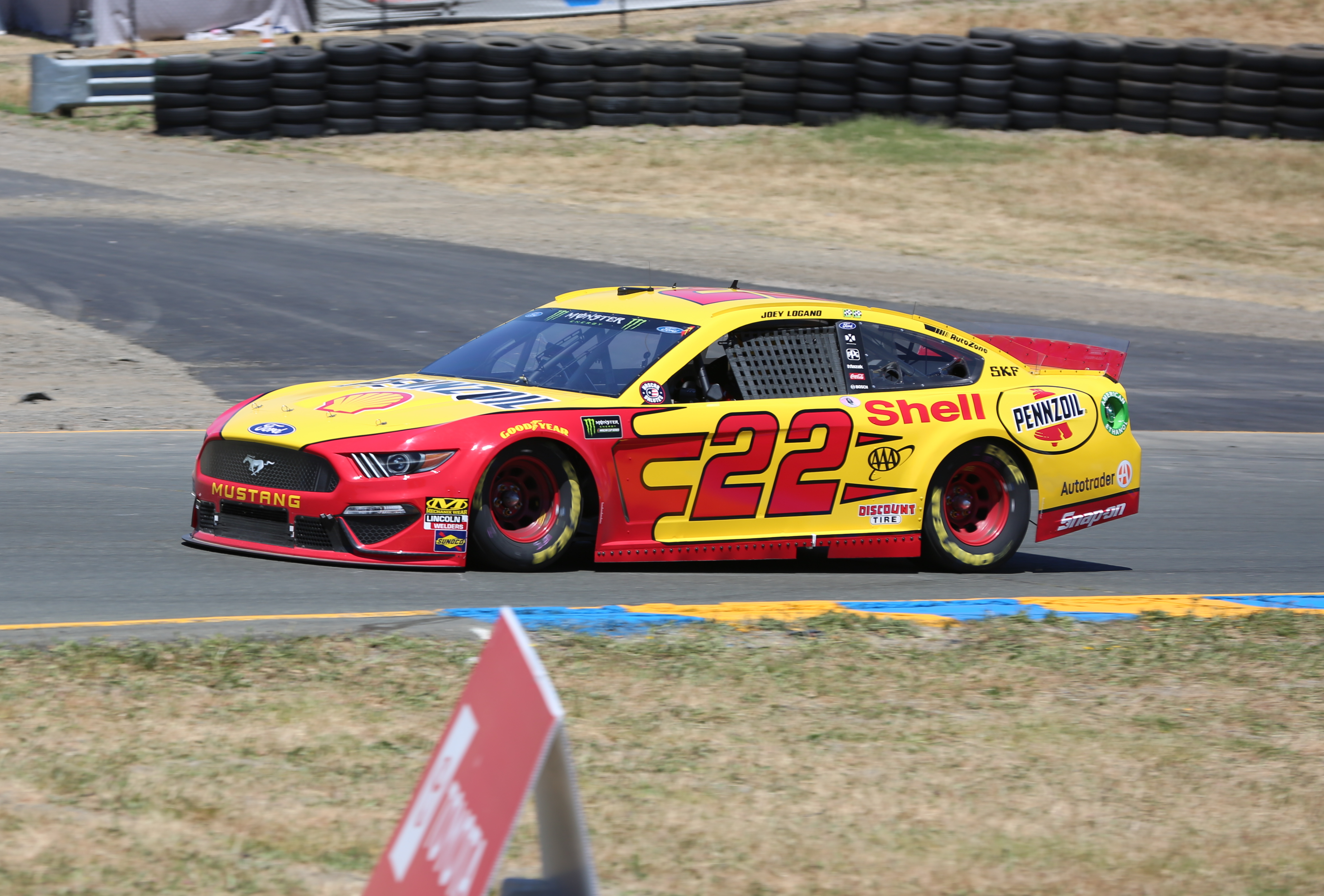
Ford replaced the Ford Fusion with a Mustang starting in 2019 in the Cup Series

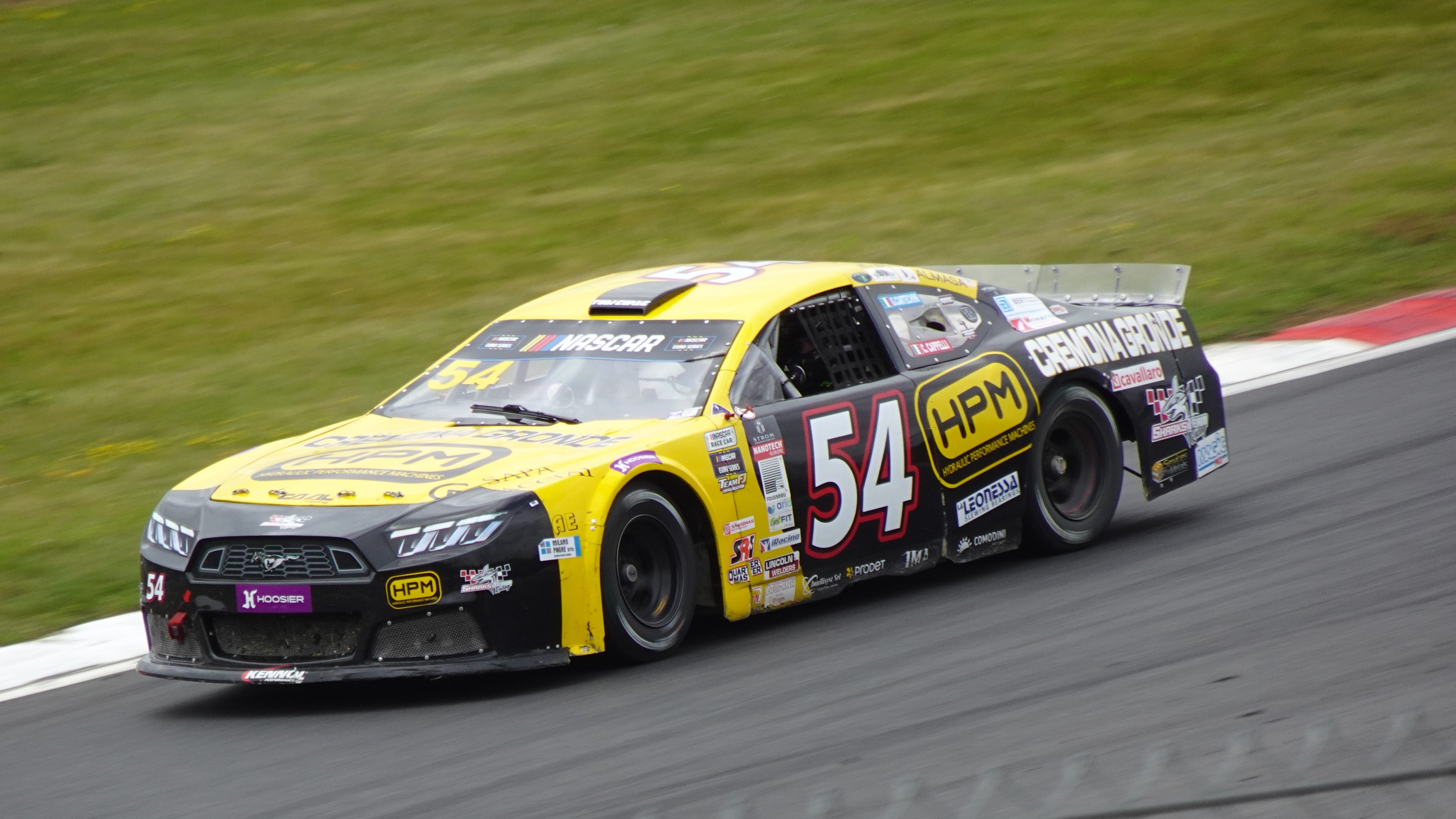
The Mustang competing in the 2026 NASCAR Euro Series

Dick Trickle won 67 short-track oval feature races in 1972, a US national record for wins in a single season.

In 2010, the Ford Mustang became Ford's Car of Tomorrow for the NASCAR Nationwide Series with full-time racing of the Mustang beginning in 2011. This opened a new chapter in both the Mustang's history and Ford's history. NASCAR insiders expected to see Mustang racing in NASCAR Sprint Cup by 2014 (the model's 50th anniversary). The NASCAR vehicles are not based on production models but are a silhouette racing car with decals that give them a superficial resemblance to road cars. Carl Edwards won the first-ever race with a NASCAR-prepped Mustang on April 8, 2011, at the Texas Motor Speedway.

Ford Mustangs have also raced in the NASCAR Xfinity Series since 2010.

Ford Mustangs are driven in the NASCAR Whelen Euro Series also.

Ford Mustangs have been track-raced in the NASCAR Cup Series since 2019, replacing the discontinued Ford Fusion.

=== Drifting ===
Mustangs have competed at the Formula Drift and D1 Grand Prix series, most notably by American driver Vaughn Gittin Jr.

Brazilian Driver Diego Higa won the Netflix Hyperdrive Series in 2019 in a 2006 Ford Mustang V8.

=== Europe ===
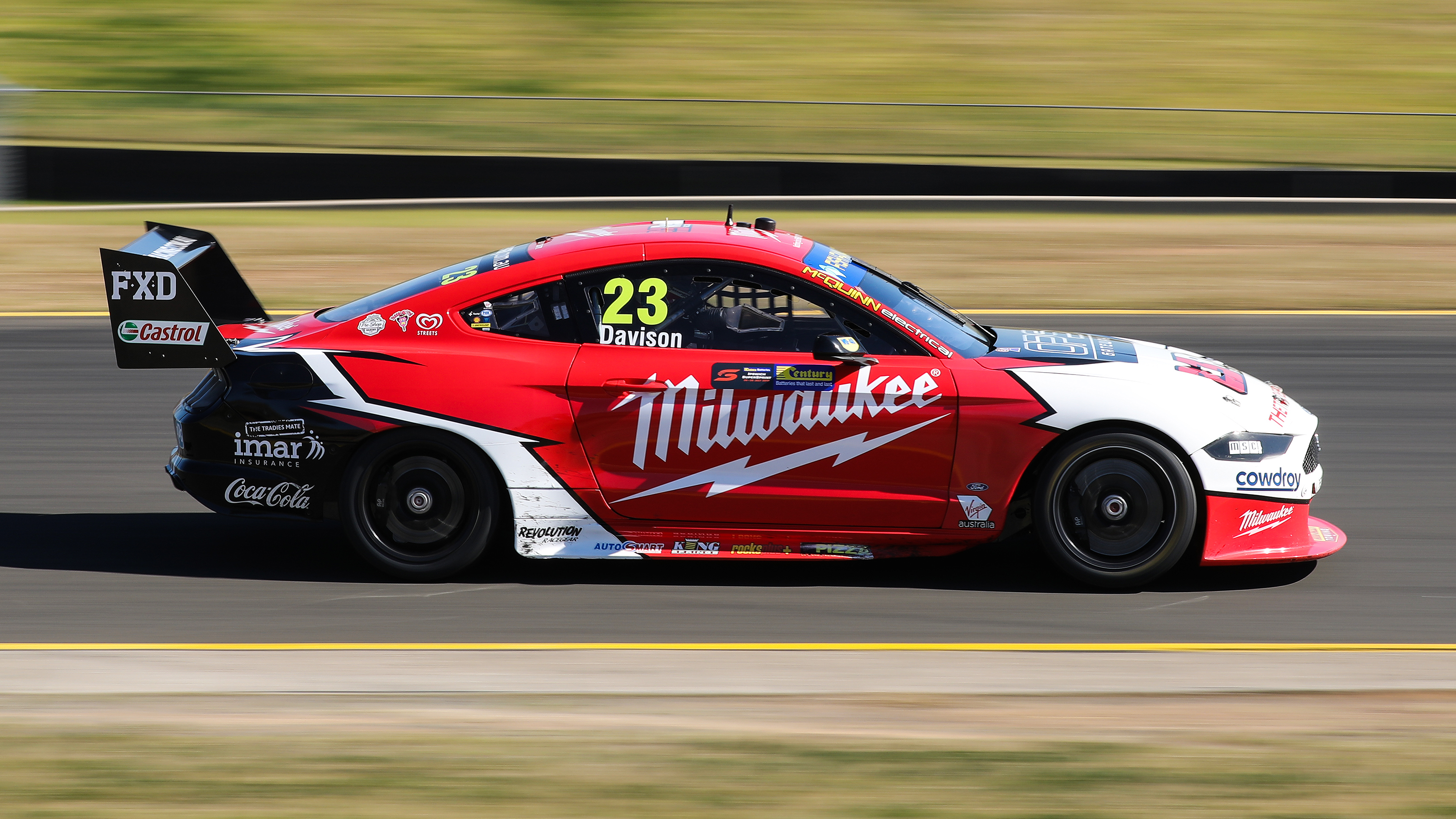
Ford introduced the Mustang as a replacement for the FG X Falcon.

Ford Mustangs compete in the FIA GT3 European Championship, and compete in the GT4 European Cup and other sports car races such as the 24 Hours of Spa. The Marc VDS Racing Team was developing the GT3 spec Mustang since 2010.

=== Australia ===
The Ford Mustang was announced as the replacement for the Ford Falcon FG X in the 2019 Supercars Championship, which is being contested in Australia and New Zealand. The Mustang placed first in the first race of the year with Scott McLaughlin winning for DJR Team Penske.

== Awards ==
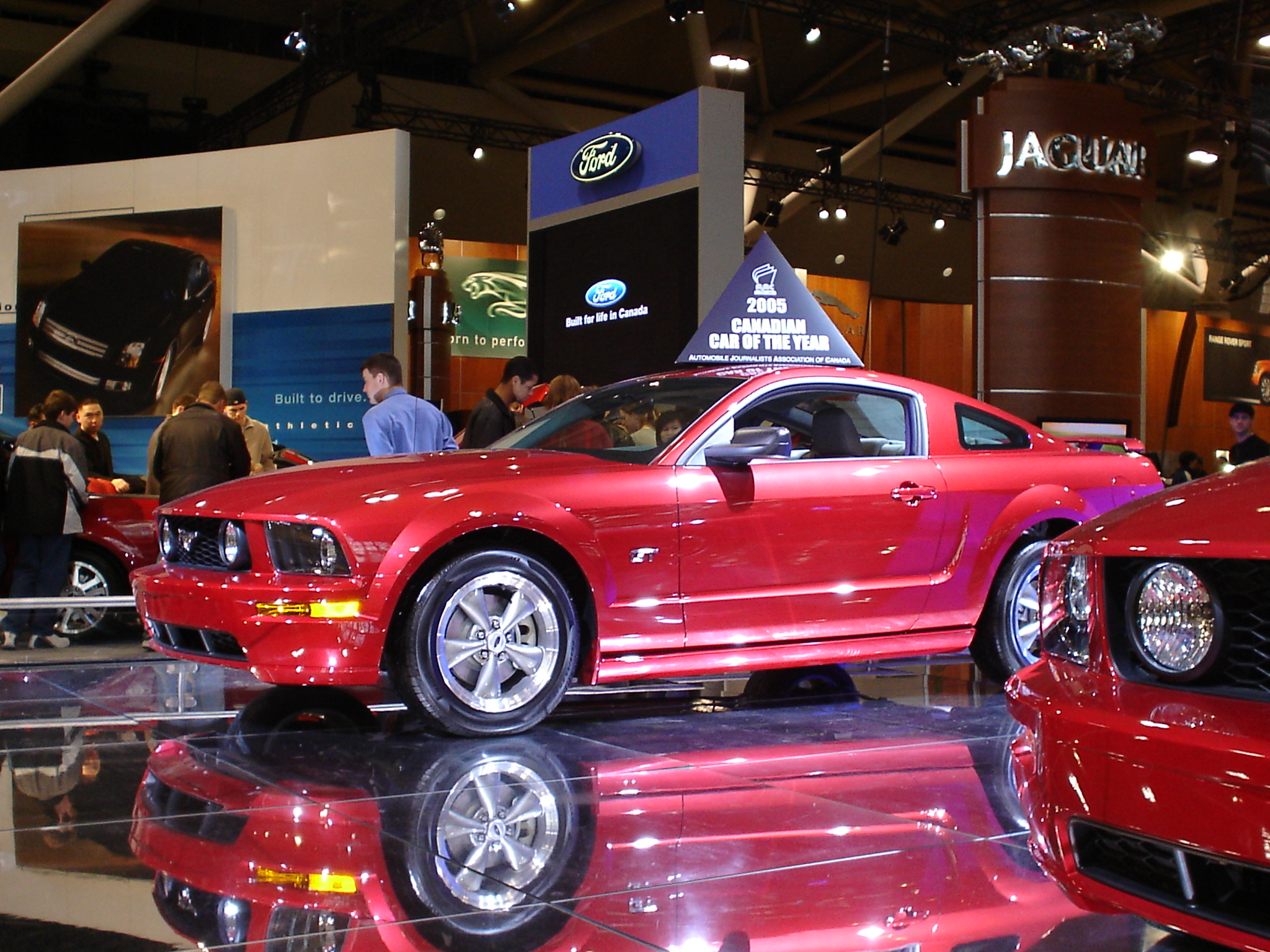
2005 Canadian Car of the Year

The 1965 Mustang won the Tiffany Gold Medal for excellence in American design, the first automobile ever to do so.

The Mustang was on the Car and Driver Ten Best list in 1983, 1987, 1988, 2005, 2006, 2011, and 2016. It won the Motor Trend Car of the Year award in 1974 and 1994.

== Sales ==
Model year	US sales
1964 1/2	121,538
1965	559,451
1966	607,568
1967	472,121
1968	317,404
1969	299,824

Model year	US sales
1970	191,239
1971	151,484
1972	125,813
1973	134,817
1974	385,993
1975	188,575
1976	187,567
1977	153,173
1978	192,410
1979	369,936

Model year	US sales
1980	271,322
1981	182,552
1982	130,418
1983	120,873
1984	141,480
1985	156,514
1986	224,410
1987	169,772
1988	211,225
1989	209,769

Model year	US sales
1990	128,189
1991	98,737
1992	79,280
1993	114,335
1994	123,198
1995	136,962
1996	122,674
1997	116,610
1998	144,732
1999	166,915

Calendar year	US sales
2000	173,676
2001	169,198
2002	138,356
2003	140,350
2004	129,858
2005	160,975
2006	166,530
2007	134,626
2008	91,251
2009	66,623

Calendar year	US sales
2010	73,716
2011	70,438
2012	82,995
2013	77,186
2014	82,635
2015	122,349
2016	105,932
2017	81,866
2018	75,842
2019	72,489

Calendar year	US sales
2020	61,090
2021	52,414
2022	47,566
2023	48,605
2024	44,003
2025	45,333

== Mustang Owner's Museum ==
In May 2016, the Mustang Owner's Museum was announced, with an official opening in Concord, North Carolina on April 17, 2019; the fifty-fifth anniversary. The decision to locate somewhere in Concord was a result of the success of the 2014 Mustang 50th-anniversary celebration at Charlotte Motor Speedway in Concord, with over 4,000 Mustangs registered and an estimated economic impact of US$8,300,000.

== In popular culture ==
The Ford Mustang has been featured in numerous media. Effective product placement allowed the car to reach "celebrity status in the 1960s". In particular, "movie glamour" assisted in establishing a positive association with the Mustang. The following are a few notable cases where embedded marketing influenced the sales or other tangible aspect of the vehicle:

- The 1964 movie The Troops of St. Tropez, was the Ford Mustang's first appearance in a movie. "Contrary to popular belief, the Ford Mustang did not make its cinematic debut in the classic James Bond film Goldfinger. On September 9, 1964, Nicole Cruchot cruised around in a Poppy Red 1964.5 Mustang convertible in the French comedy Le Gendarme de Saint-Tropez. Known to American audiences as The Troops of St. Tropez, Cruchot's character, Geneviève Grad, holds the distinct honor of being the first person to drive a Ford Mustang on the silver screen."
- The 1964 movie Goldfinger, was the Ford Mustang's second appearance in a feature film and timed with the car's introduction in the US marketplace.
- The song "Mustang Sally", written and first recorded by Mack Rice in 1965—covered by Wilson Pickett in 1966 and other artists since—is about a man who buys a Mustang for his girlfriend, Sally, who ends up preferring the car over him. It has been described by one cultural historian as "free advertising for the Ford Motor Company."
- The TV series The F.B.I. was sponsored by Ford Motor Company. Efrem Zimbalist Jr. drove new Mustang convertibles during the first four seasons (1965–1969), and viewers can see how the Mustang evolved into a muscle car.
- Using real cars, Steve McQueen drove a debadged Highland Green 1968 Mustang GT fastback with a 390 cubic inch engine and 4 speed transmission in a chase scene, alongside a black 1968 Dodge Charger, in the 1968 film Bullitt. Ford has released several special editions of the Mustang paying homage to the movie car.
- A 1971 Mustang (modified to look like a 1973 model), nicknamed "Eleanor", was the feature car in the 1974 car heist film Gone in 60 Seconds. "Eleanor" returned, as a 1967 Mustang Shelby GT500, in the movie's remake in 2000. The remake version of Eleanor featured a custom body kit designed by Chip Foose that has inspired numerous restomods since.
- The racing video game Ford Mustang: The Legend Lives, released in 2005, features only Mustangs.
- The 2008 TV movie Knight Rider featured a black 2008 Ford Mustang Shelby GT500KR as KITT (replacing the 1982 Pontiac Firebird from the original series), voiced by Val Kilmer.
- The David Gelb directed documentary A Faster Horse covers the creation of the 2015 Mustang.
- The 2014 film Need for Speed features, along with a Shelby Mustang integral to the plot, a 2015 Mustang that briefly appears at the end. Like with Goldfinger, the scene was shot before the car was revealed to the public. A prototype was used and kept secret, with only the actors and film crew allowed to see the car.

== See also ==
- Ford Mustang GT3
- Ford Mustang variants
- California Special Mustang
- Ford Mustang SSP
