= Hudson Motor Car Company =

American auto company (1909-1954)

Coordinates: 42°22′20″N 82°57′33″W

- Industry: Automobile
- Founded: May 25, 1909; 117 years ago
- Defunct: July 4, 1954; 72 years ago
- Fate: Merged with Nash-Kelvinator
- Successor: American Motors Corporation (AMC)
- Headquarters: Detroit, Michigan, United States
- Key people: Joseph L. Hudson; Roy D. Chapin; A.E. Barit
- Products: Vehicles

The Hudson Motor Car Company was an American automobile company headquartered in Detroit, Michigan which manufactured Hudson and other branded vehicles from 1909 until 1954. The company sold autos in the US and internationally.

In 1954, Hudson merged with Nash-Kelvinator to form American Motors Corporation (AMC). The Hudson name was marketed through the 1957 model year, after which it was discontinued.

Hudson cars have an unconventional style and many design features that interest enthusiasts and collectors. Some models are valuable, such as the Hudson Hornet.

== Origin ==
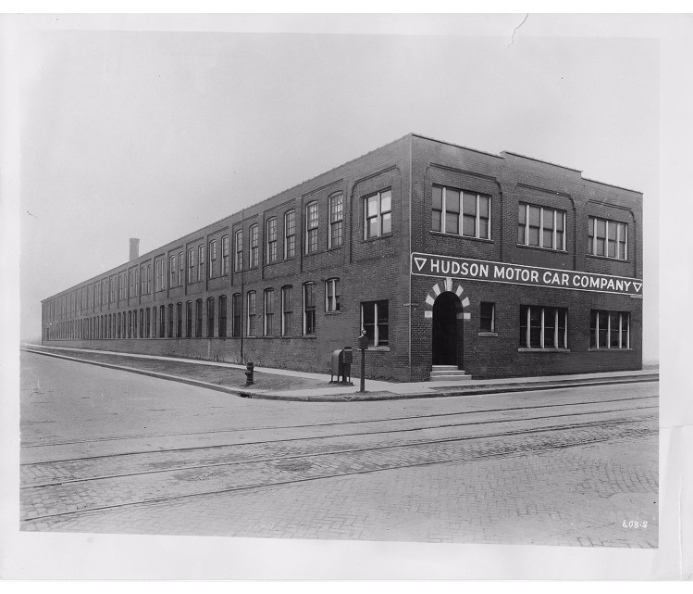
Hudson's first factory at Mack and Beaufait Avenues, 1909 photo

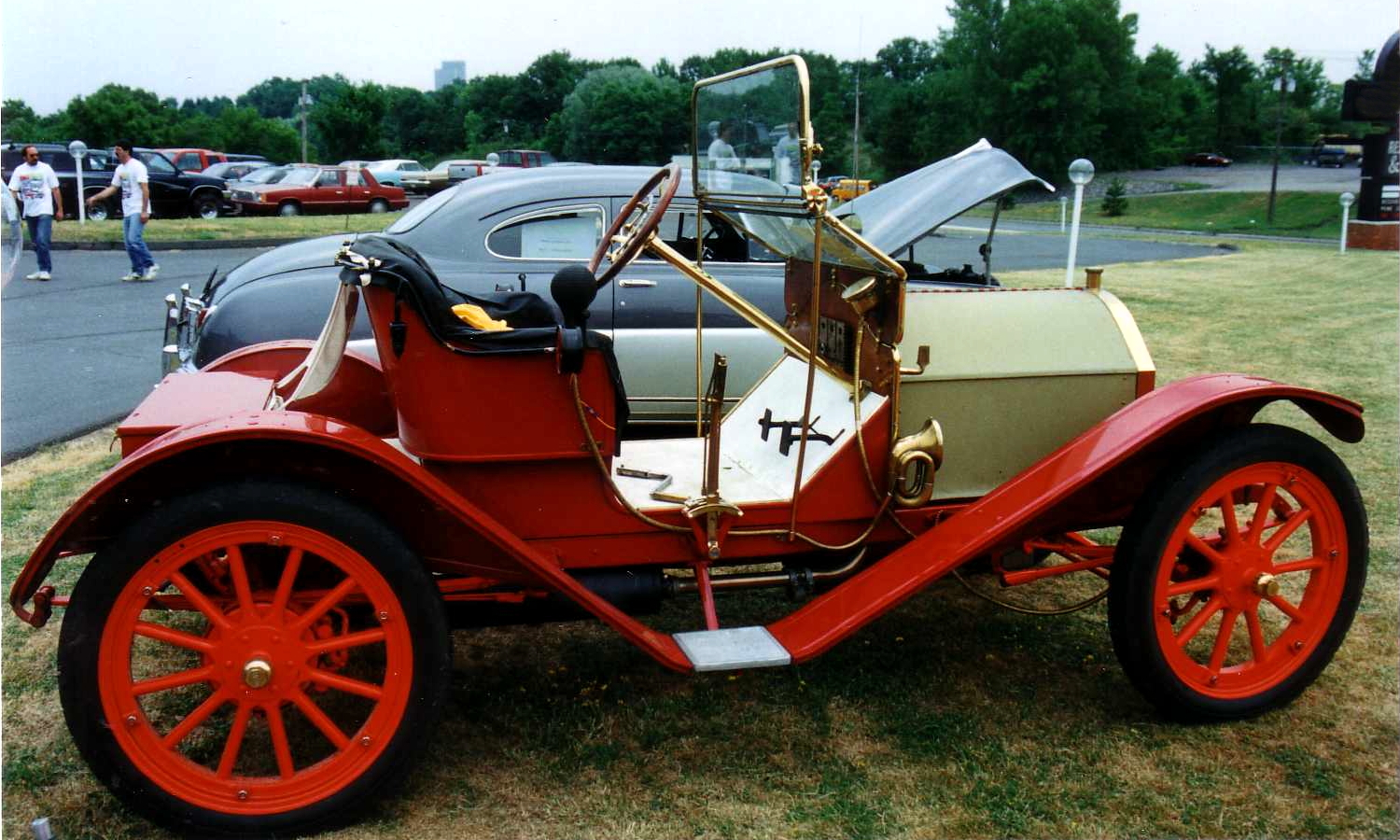
1910 Hudson Model 20 Roadster

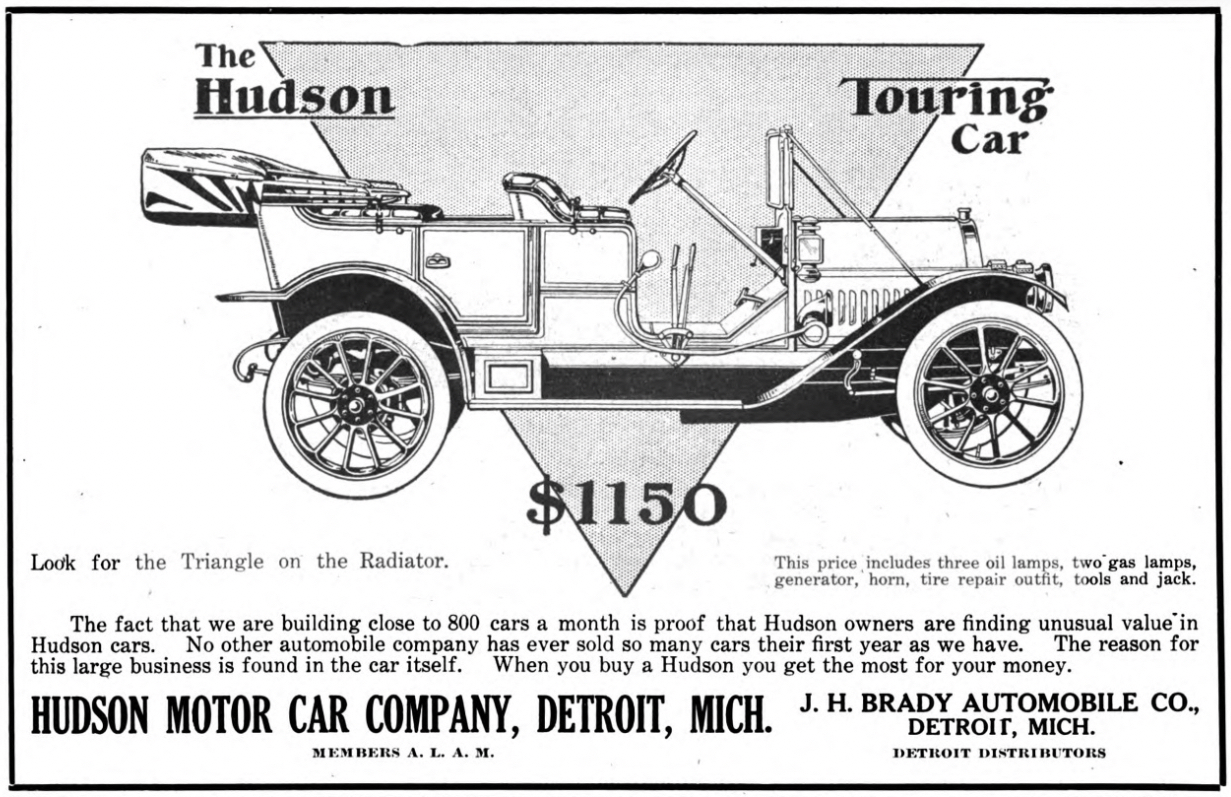
Hudson advertisement (1910)

Hudson advertisement (1913)

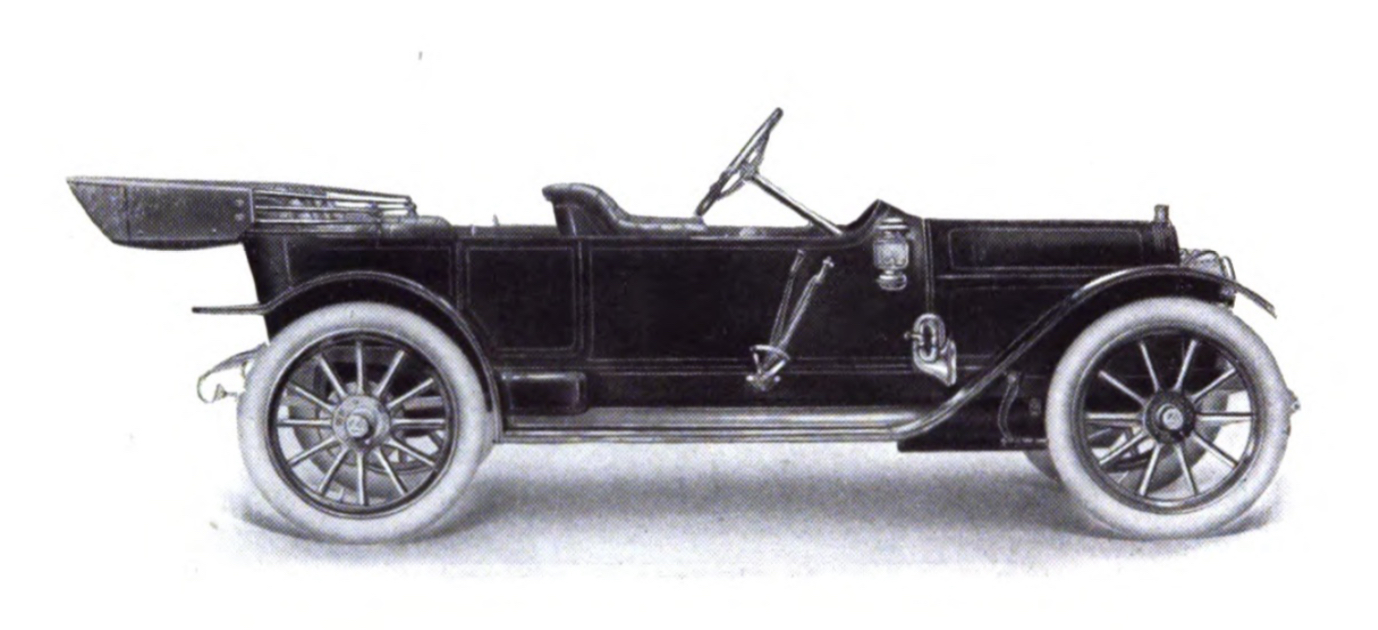
Hudson 33 Torpedo (1911-1912)

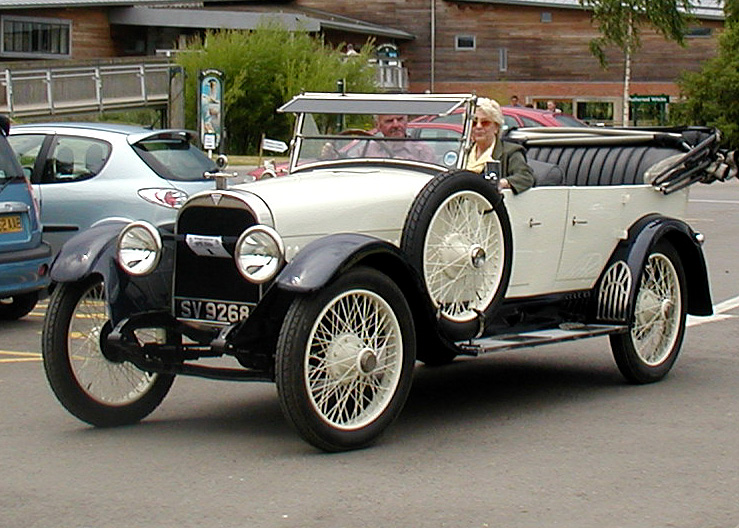
1917 Hudson Phaeton

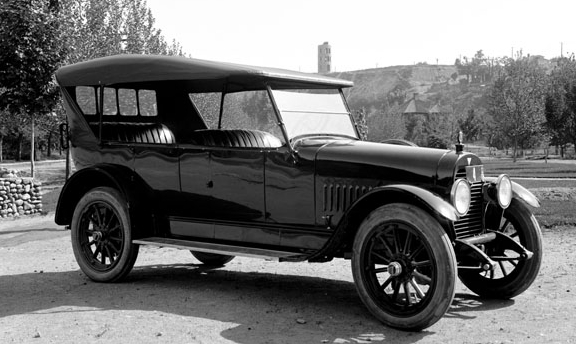
1919 Hudson Phantom, 1919 photo

A group of businesspeople established the Hudson Motor Car Company. Several had experience in the developing industry and shared a desire to build their own automobile company. The name "Hudson" came from Joseph L. Hudson, a Detroit department store entrepreneur and founder of Hudson's department store. He provided the initial capital and allowed the company to be named after him.

A total of eight Detroit businessmen officially incorporated the company on 20 February 1909. With approximately $90,000 in primary capital provided by Hudson, who was named chairman, the goal was to produce an automobile that would sell for less than US$1,000 (equivalent to approximately $35,833 in 2025 funds).

One of the lead "car men" and an organizer of the company was Roy D. Chapin Sr., a young executive who had worked with Ransom E. Olds (Chapin's son, Roy Jr., would later be president of the Hudson-Nash descendant firm, American Motors Corporation in the 1960s). Others with automotive experience included Howard E. Coffin, an engineer; Fred Bezner, a purchasing agent; and James Brady, a mechanic and operations manager.

Advertising for the new car drew approximately 4,000 potential customers to send in $25 deposits. The new company leased a vacant factory on the corner of Mack Avenue and Beaufait Street on the East Side of Detroit. This building was built in 1906 for the Aerocar Company.

The company quickly started production, with the first car driven out of the small factory on 3 July 1909. The new Hudson "Twenty" was one of the first low-priced cars on the American market and became a success, with 4,508 sold in the first year. This was the best first year's production in the history of the automobile industry and put the newly formed company in 17th place industry-wide, "a remarkable achievement at a time" when there were hundreds of makes being marketed.

The increasing sales volume necessitated a larger factory. A new facility was built on a 22-acre (8.9 ha) parcel at Jefferson Avenue and Conner Avenue in Detroit's Fairview section that was diagonally across from the Chalmers Automobile plant. The land was the former farm of D.J. Campau. It was designed by the firm of renowned industrial architect Albert Kahn, with 223,500 square feet (20,760 m^{2}), and opened on 29 October 1910. Production in 1911 increased to 6,486. In 1913, there were 47 engineers working in the vehicle development. For 1914, Hudsons for the American market were now left-hand drive.

== Expansion ==
Coachbuilder Fisher Body Co. built bodies for Hudson cars (as well as many other automotive marques) until they were bought out by General Motors in 1919. From 1923, Hudson bodies were built exclusively by the Massachusetts company Biddle and Smart. The lucrative contract with Hudson would see Biddle and Smart buy up many smaller local coachbuilders to meet the demand for Hudsons. Peak shipments came in 1926, when the company delivered 41,000 bodies to Hudson. An inability to stamp steel meant that their products were made using aluminum.

On 1 July 1926, Hudson's new US$10 million ($181,860,902 in 2025 dollars) body plant was completed, allowing the automaker to build the all-steel closed bodies for both the Hudson and Essex models. Biddle and Smart continued to build aluminum-bodied versions of the Hudson line, which Hudson marketed as "custom-built," although they were identical to the steel-bodied vehicles. With the automaker now building in-house, Biddle and Smart saw their work for Hudson drop by 60%. From 1927, Hudson gradually began to use local coachbuilders Briggs Manufacturing Company and Murray Corporation of America to supplement its production, which was expanding domestically and internationally. With car prices falling due to the Great Depression and the costs to transport vehicles from Massachusetts to Detroit becoming too expensive, the contract with Biddle and Smart was terminated in 1930, and Biddle and Smart went out of business shortly thereafter.

At their peak in 1929, Hudson and Essex produced a combined 300,000 cars in one year, including contributions from Hudson's other factories in Belgium and England; a factory had been built in 1925 in Brentford in London. Hudson was the third largest U.S. car maker that year, after Ford Motor Company and Chevrolet. Hudson also offered trucks, but in much smaller numbers: in 1938, they sold 719 trucks and in 1939 they sold 409 of them.

Hudson had many firsts for the auto industry; these included dual brakes, the use of dashboard oil-pressure and generator warning lights, and the first balanced crankshaft, which allowed the Hudson straight-six engine, dubbed the "Super Six" (1916), to work at a higher rotational speed while remaining smooth, developing more power for its size than lower-speed engines. The Super Six was the first engine built by Hudson. Previously, Hudson had developed engine designs and then had them manufactured by Continental Motors Company. Most Hudsons until 1957 had straight-6 engines. The dual brake system used a secondary mechanical emergency brake system, which activated the rear brakes when the pedal traveled beyond the normal reach of the primary system; a mechanical parking brake was also used. Hudson transmissions also used an oil bath and cork clutch mechanism that proved as durable as it was smooth.

== Essex and Terraplane ==
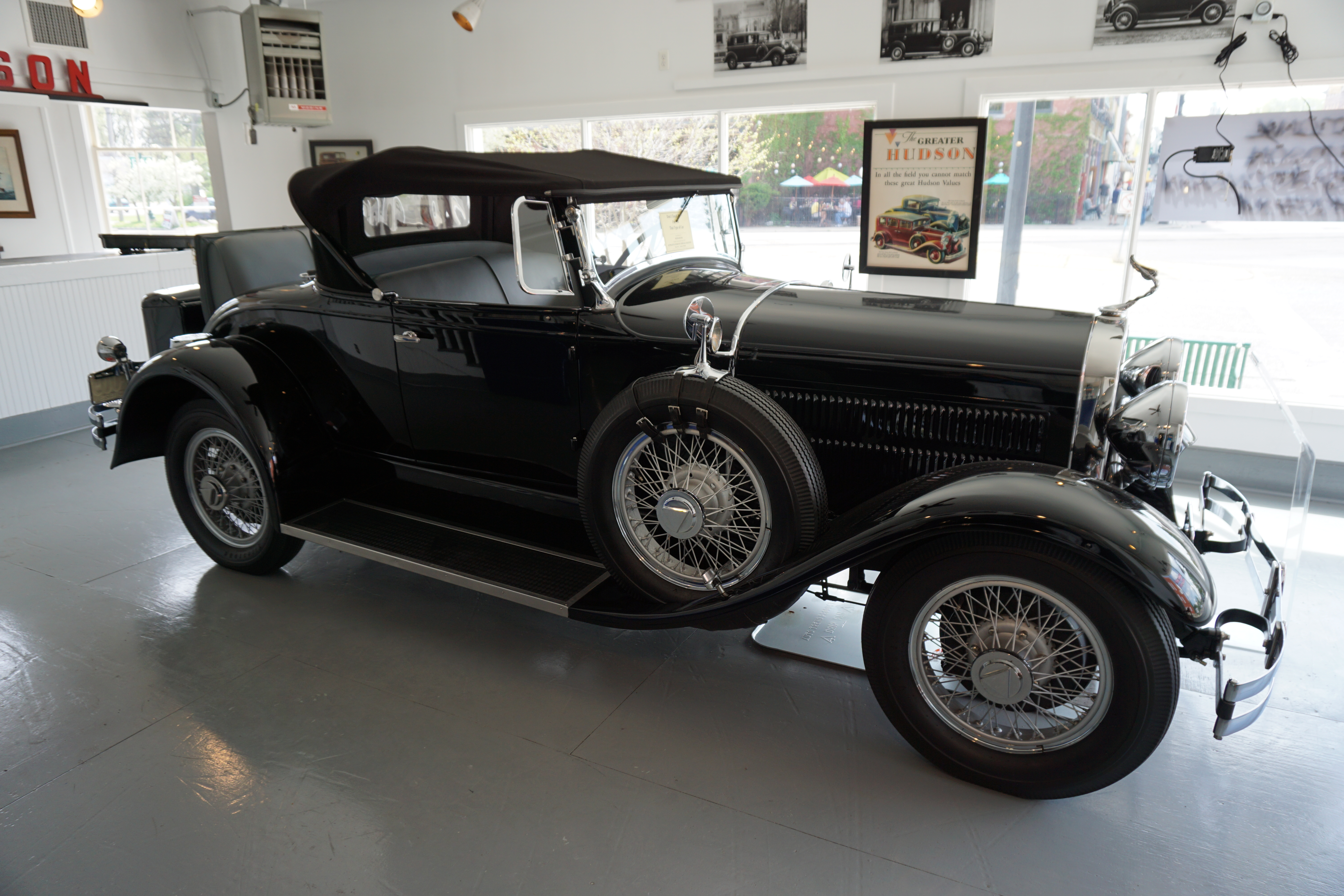
1929 Hudson Roadster

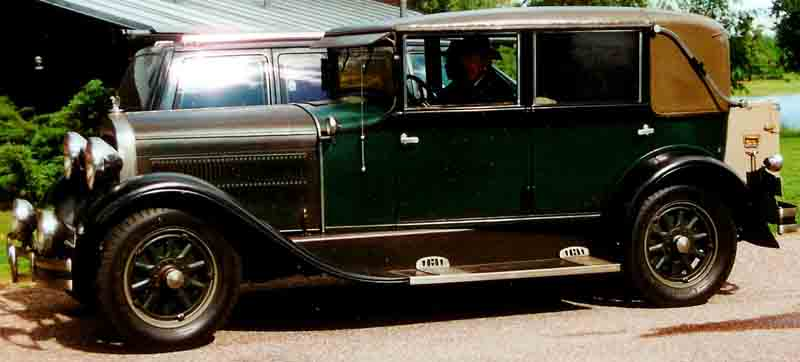
1929 Hudson Model R 4-Door Landau Sedan

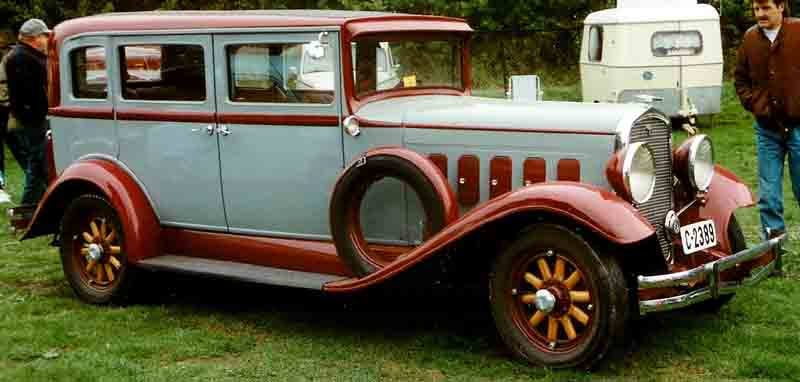
1931 Hudson 4-Door Sedan

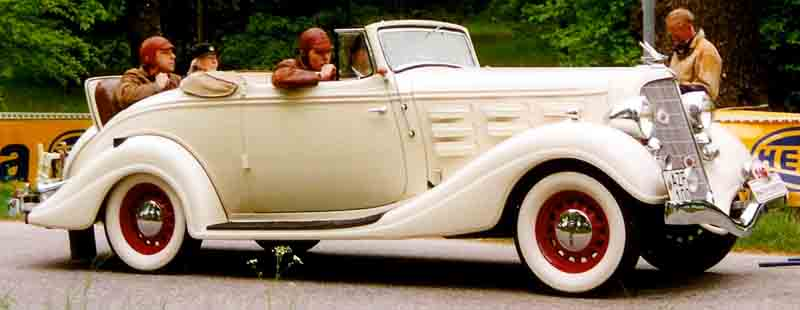
1934 Hudson Eight Convertible Coupé

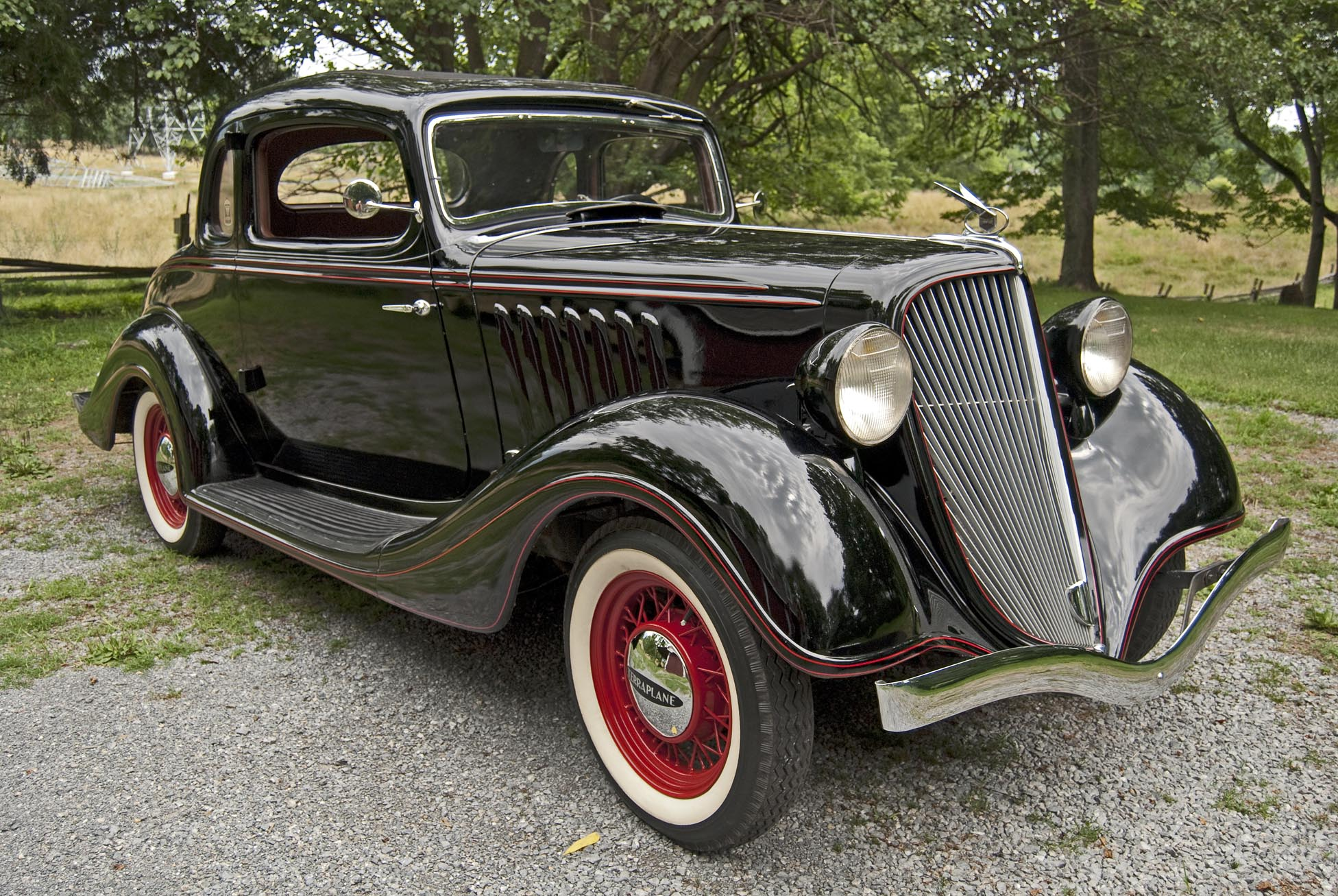
1934 Hudson Terraplane K-coupe

In 1919, Hudson introduced the Essex brand line of automobiles; the line was originally for budget-minded buyers, designed to compete with Ford and Chevrolet, as opposed to the more up-scale Hudson line competing with Oldsmobile and Studebaker. Local coachbuilder Briggs Manufacturing introduced their first-of-its-kind closed coach body in 1922 for Hudson's Essex. It was the first closed vehicle available at a price close to its open-bodied brethren. The 1922 Essex closed body was priced at only $300 more than the 1922 Essex touring. Within three years, its popularity enabled Hudson to reduce its price so that both the 1925 Essex touring and coach were priced the same. The Essex found great success by offering one of the first affordable sedans, and combined Hudson and Essex sales moved from seventh in the U.S. to third by 1925.

In 1932, Hudson began phasing out its Essex nameplate for the modern Terraplane brand name. The new line was launched on July 21, 1932, with a promotional christening by Amelia Earhart. For 1932 and 1933, the restyled cars were named Essex-Terraplane; from 1934 as Terraplane, until 1938 when the Terraplane was renamed the Hudson 112. Hudson also began assembling cars in Canada, contracting Canada Top and Body to build the cars in their Tilbury, Ontario, plant. In England, Terraplanes built at the Brentford factory were still being advertised in 1938.

An optional accessory on some 1935–1938 Hudson and Terraplane models was a steering column-mounted electric gear pre-selector and electro-mechanical automatic shifting system, known as the "Electric Hand", manufactured by the Bendix Corporation. This took the place of the floor-mounted shift lever, but required conventional clutch actions. Cars equipped with the feature also carried a conventional shift lever in clips under the dash, which could be pulled out and put to use in case the Electric Hand should ever fail. Hudson was also noted for offering an optional vacuum-powered automatic clutch, starting in the early 1930s.

== Hudson Eight ==
For the 1930 model year, Hudson debuted a new flathead inline eight cylinder engine with block and crankcase cast as a unit and fitted with two cylinder heads. A 2.75-inch bore and 4.5-inch stroke displaced 218.8 cu in (3.6 L) developing 80 hp (60 kW; 81 PS) at 3,600 rpm with the standard 5.78:1 compression ratio. The five main bearing crankshaft had eight integral counterweights, an industry first, and also employed a Lanchester vibration damper. Four rubber blocks were used at engine mount points. A valveless oil pump improved the Hudson splash lubrication system.

The new eights were the only engine offering in the Hudson line, supplanting the Super Six, which continued in the Essex models.

At the 1931 Indianapolis 500, Buddy Marr's #27 Hudson Special (using a Winfield carburetor) finished the 200 laps in tenth place.

== 1936–1942 ==
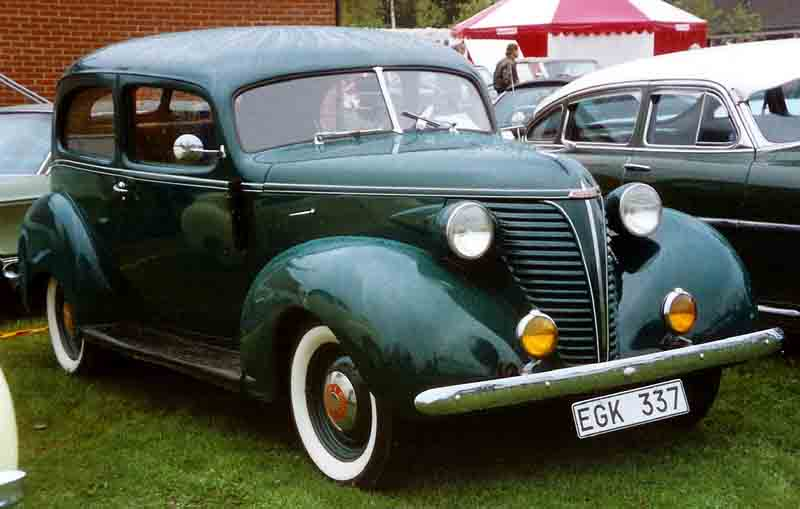
1938 Hudson 112 coupé

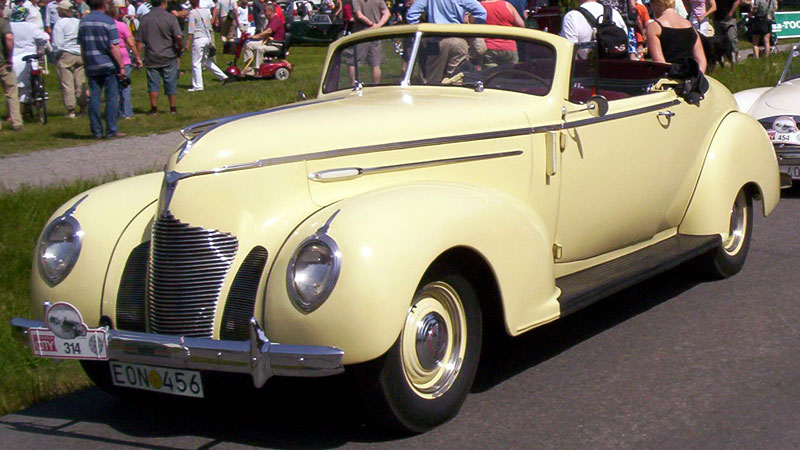
1939 Hudson Country Club Six Series 93 Convertible Coupé

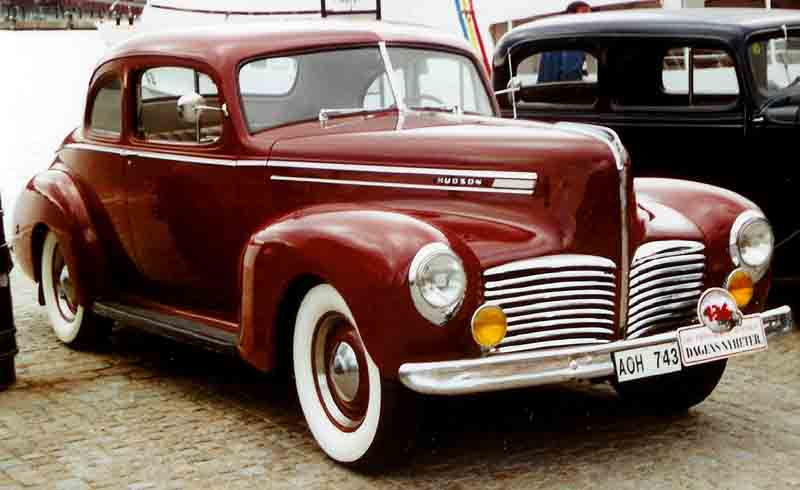
1941 Hudson Coupé

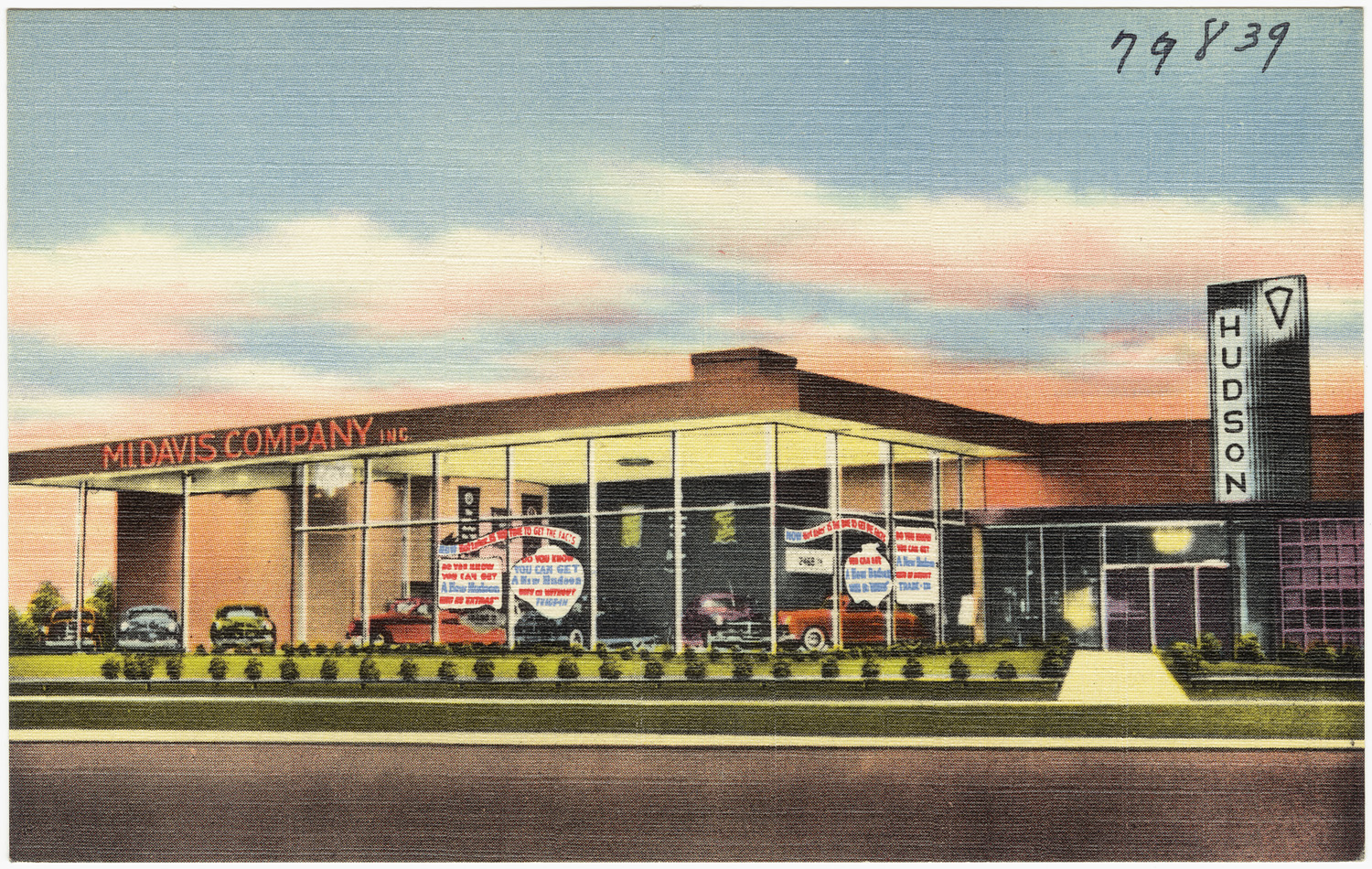
Hudson dealer in Louisiana, c. 1930–1945

In 1936, Hudson revamped its cars, introducing a new "radial safety control" / "rhythmic ride" suspension which suspended the live front axle from two steel bars, as well as from leaf springs. Doing this allowed the use of longer, softer leaf springs ("rhythmic ride"), and prevented bumps and braking from moving the car off course. The 1936 Hudsons were also considerably larger inside than competitive cars — Hudson claimed a 145 cu ft (4.1 m^{3}) interior, comparing it to the 121 cu ft (3.4 m^{3}) in the "largest of other popular cars" of the time. With an optional bulging trunk lid, Hudson claimed the trunk could accommodate 21 cu ft (0.59 m^{3}) of luggage. The 1936 engines were powerful for the time, from 93 to 124 hp (69 to 92 kW; 94 to 126 PS).

The 1939 models joined other American cars in the use of a column-mounted gearshift lever. This freed front-seat passenger space and remained the industry standard through the 1960s, when "bucket seats" came into vogue. Hudson became the first car manufacturer to use foam rubber in its seats. The Hudson Terraplane was dropped. For the 1940 models, Hudson introduced coil spring independent front suspension, aircraft-style shock absorbers mounted within the front springs, and true center-point steering on all its models, a major advance in performance among cars in this price range. The Super Six model was reintroduced as well. Despite all these changes, Hudson's sales for 1940 were lower than in 1939 and the company lost money again. The advent of military contracts the following year brought relief.

The 1941 Hudsons retained the front-end styling of the 1940 models but the bodies were new with 5.5 inches added to their length giving more legroom. A new manual 3-speed synchromesh transmission was quieter with all helical gears. Wheelbases increased by 3 inches, with offerings of 116, 121, and 128 inches, and height was decreased with flatter roofs. Convertibles now had a power-operated top. Big Boy trucks now used the 128-inch wheelbase. In 1942, as a response to General Motors' Hydramatic automatic transmission, Hudson introduced its "Drive-Master" system. Drive-Master was a more sophisticated combination of the concepts used in the Electric Hand and the automatic clutch. It contained a vacuum-powered module on the transmission to switch between second and third gear and a vacuum-powered module to pull the clutch in and out. At the touch of a button, Drive-Master offered the driver a choice of three modes of operation: ordinary, manual shifting and clutching; manual shifting with automatic clutching; and automatic shifting with automatic clutching. All this was accomplished by a large and complicated mechanism located under the hood. They worked well, and in fully automatic mode served as a good semi-automatic transmission. When coupled with an automatic overdrive, Drive-Master became known as Super-Matic. Re-engineering of the frame rear end to use lower springs reduced car height by 1.5 in (38 mm). Sheet metal "spats" on the lower body now covered the running boards and new wider front and rear fenders accommodated this.

== Female designer ==
As the role of women increased in car-purchase decisions, automakers began to hire female designers. Hudson, wanting a female perspective on automotive design, hired Elizabeth Ann Thatcher in 1939, one of America's first female automotive designers. Her contributions to the 1941 Hudson included exterior trim with side lighting, interior instrument panel, interiors and interior trim fabrics. She designed for Hudson from 1939 into 1941, leaving the company when she married Joe Oros, then a designer for Cadillac. He later became head of the design team at Ford that created the Mustang.

== World War II ==
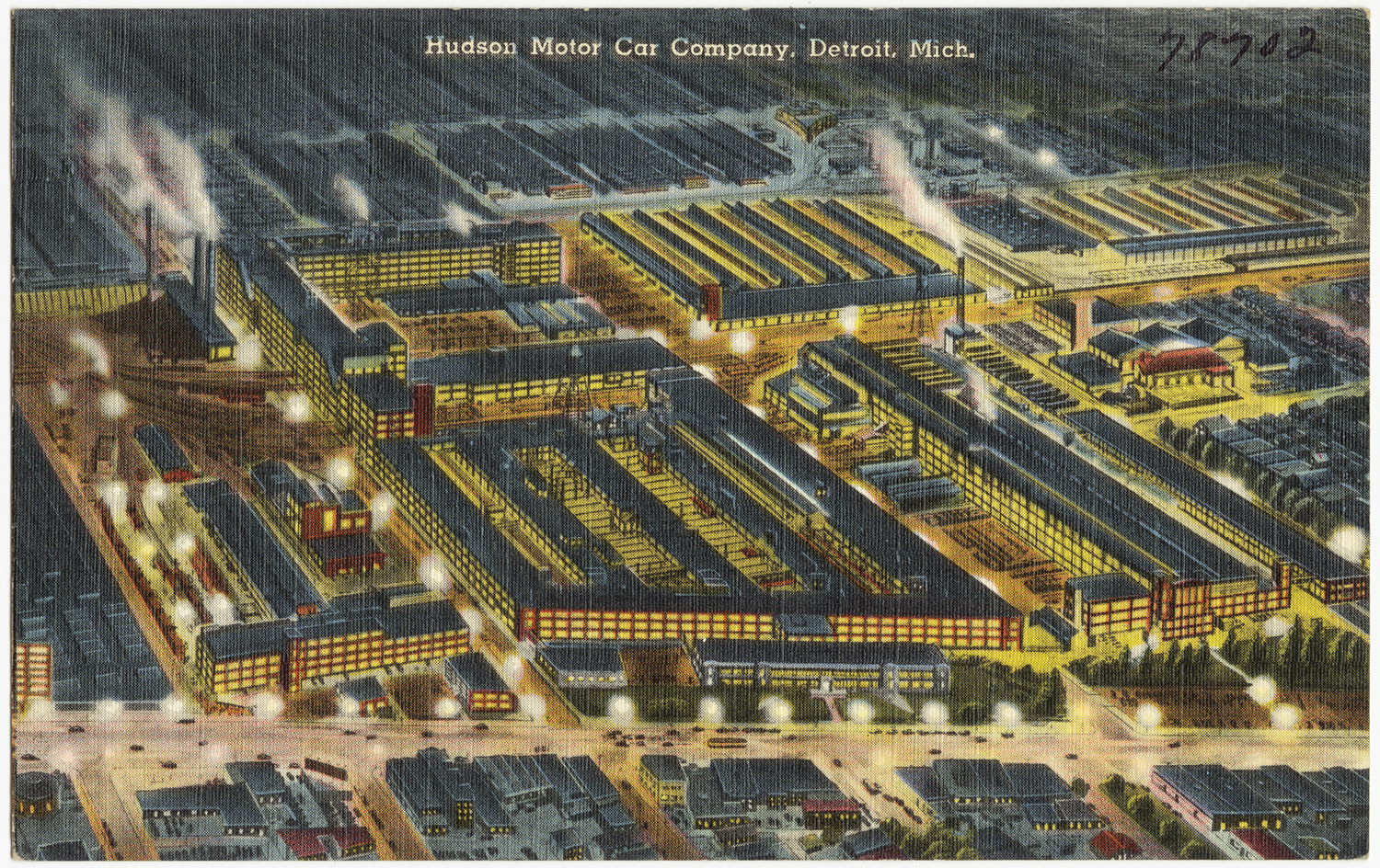
Hudson Motor Car Co. factory in Detroit, c. 1930–1945

As ordered by the Federal government, Hudson ceased auto production from 1942 until 1945 to manufacture materiel during World War II, including aircraft parts and naval engines as well as anti-aircraft guns. The Hudson "Invader" engine powered many of the landing craft used on the D-Day invasion of Normandy, June 6, 1944.

During World War II Hudson had also an aircraft division that produced ailerons for one large eastern airplane builder. The plant was capable of large scale production of wings and ailerons as well as other airplane parts. On May 22, 1941, Hudson was given a contract for the Oerlikon 20 mm cannon with the Jefferson Avenue Plant, on Jefferson Avenue and Connor Avenue, responsible for converting the original Swiss drawings to American production standards. The company produced 33,201 Oerlikons for the United States Navy with the original mechanism continued in use without major change and with complete interchangeability of parts until the end of the war. Hudson also manufactured millions of other weaponry and vehicle parts for the war effort. Hudson ranked 83rd among United States corporations in the value of World War II military production contracts.

== Fisher takeover attempt ==
The Fisher Body Company, later the Fisher Body Division of GM, manufactured bodies for many automobile marques throughout the early 20th Century. From 1926 the business had become part of General Motors. Just before World War II, the Fisher brothers contemplated a takeover of Hudson and commissioned engineer Roscoe C. (Rod) Hoffman, from Detroit, to design and build several rear-engine prototype vehicles for possible eventual production as Hudsons. One prototype was built in secret in 1935.

World War II forced the brothers to shelve their plans while the company shifted its focus to the war effort. When brothers Fred and Charles retired from GM in 1944 they revived the Hudson takeover idea with the view of establishing new, independent automobile manufacturing operations. The brothers contacted Queen Wilhelmina of the Netherlands, Hudson's main stockholder, offering to buy. Using an intermediary, Queen Wilhelmina expressed her interest in selling, prompting the Fisher brothers to begin devoting time to Hudson and their plant in anticipation of a deal. When news of these events reached Wall Street, the price of Hudson stock skyrocketed with the consensus by investors that a Fisher takeover would be the best thing for Hudson. However, the Fisher brothers tender offer fell short of Hudson's sudden increased market value and the deal did not go through.

== 1946–1953 ==
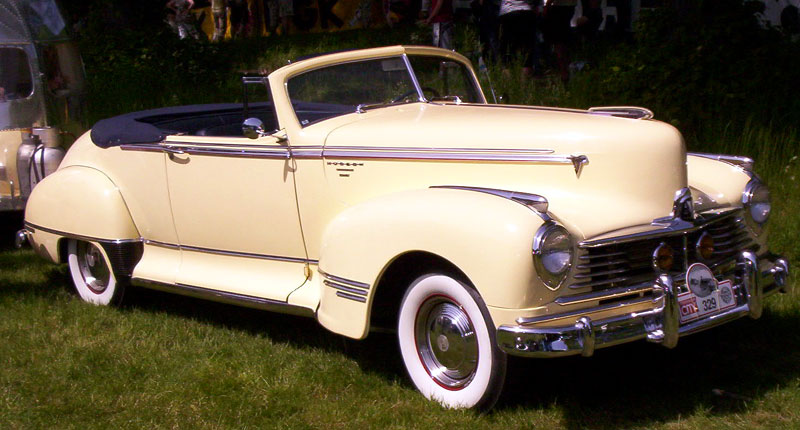
1947 Commodore Eight Convertible

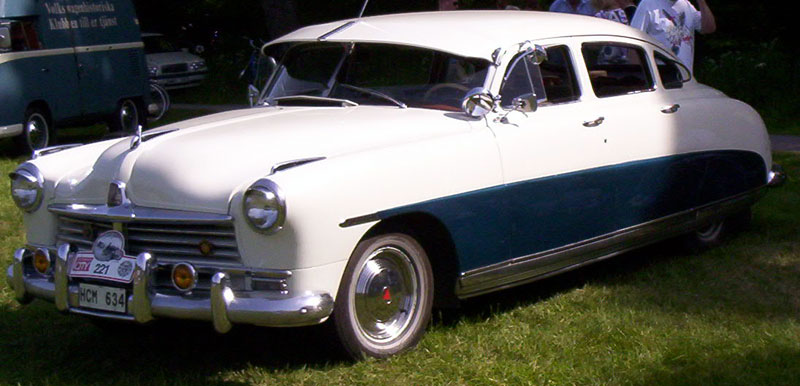
1949 Hudson Commodore 4-Door Sedan

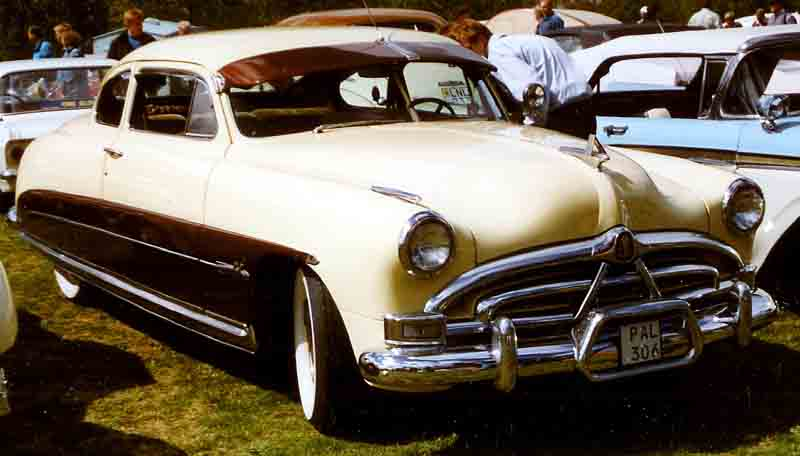
1951 Hornet Club Coupé

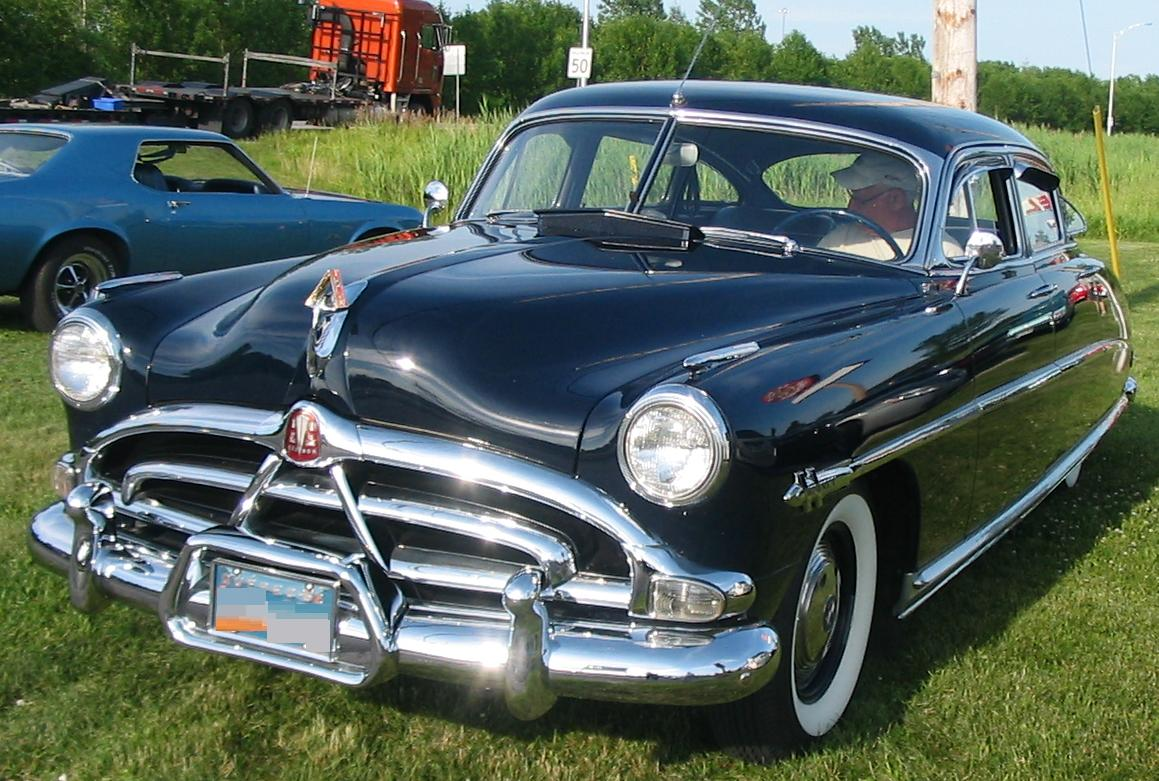
1952 Hornet Sedan

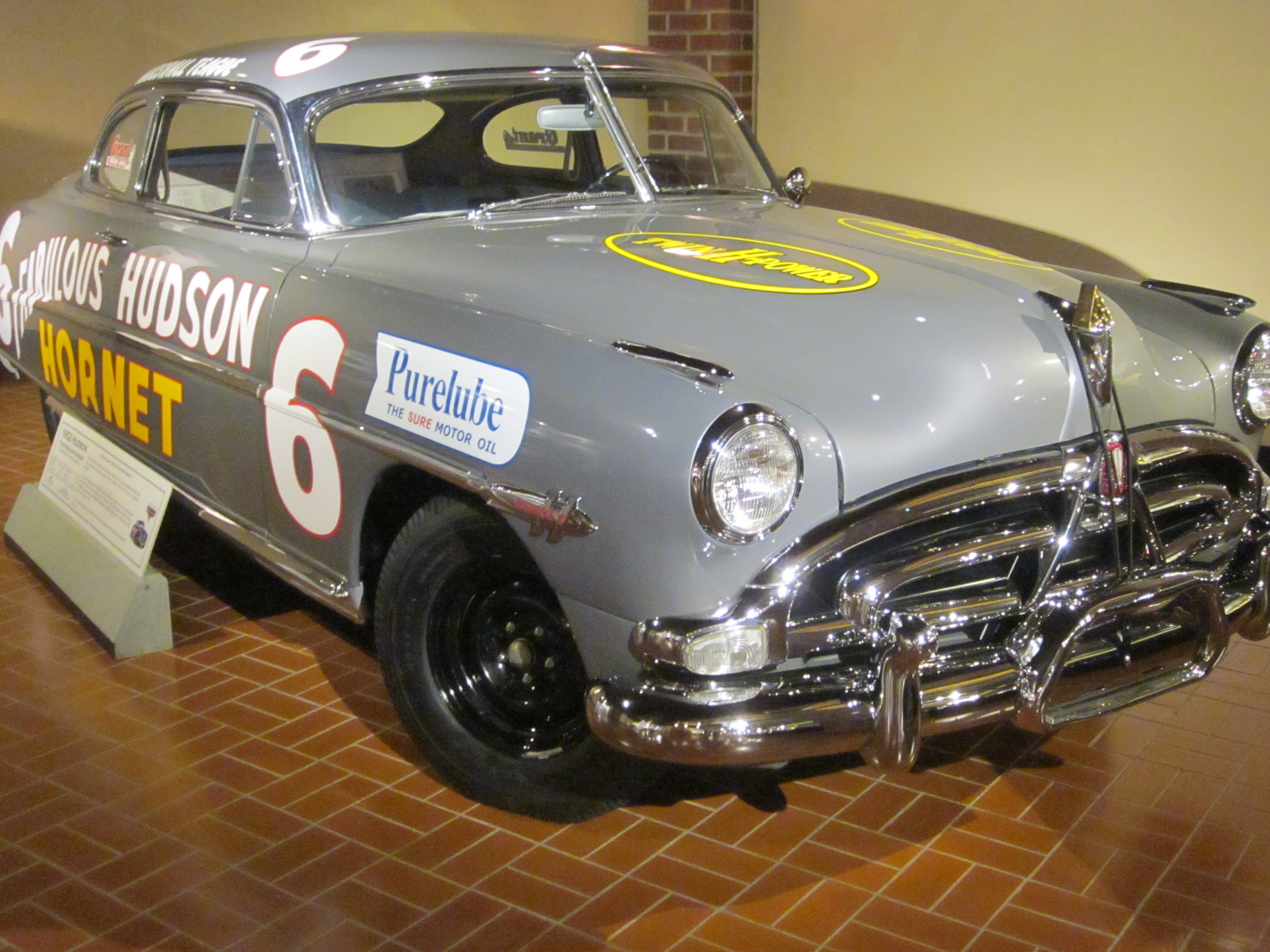
Hudson Hornet race car

Production resumed after the war and included a 128 in (3,251 mm) wheelbase three-quarter-ton pickup truck.

In 1948, the company launched its "step-down" bodies, which lasted through the 1954 model year. The term step-down referred to Hudson's placement of the passenger compartment down inside the perimeter of the frame; riders stepped down onto a floor that was surrounded by the perimeter of the car's frame. The result was not only a safer car, and greater passenger comfort as well, but, through a lower center of gravity, a good handling car. In time almost all U.S. automakers would embrace it as a means of building bodies. Automotive author Richard Langworth described the step-down models as the greatest autos of the era in articles for Consumer Guide and Collectible Automobile.

For the 1951 model year, the 6-cylinder engine received a new block with thicker walls and other improvements to boost horsepower by almost 18% and torque by 28.5% making Hudson a hot performer again. The GM-supplied 4-speed Hydramatic automatic transmission was now optional in Hornets and Commodore Custom 6s and 8s.

Hudson's strong, light-weight bodies, combined with its high-torque inline six-cylinder engine technology, made the company's 1951–54 Hornet an auto racing champion, dominating NASCAR in 1951, 1952, 1953, and 1954.

Herb Thomas won the 1951 and 1954 Southern 500s and Dick Rathmann won in 1952. Some NASCAR records set by Hudson in the 1950s (e.g. consecutive wins in one racing season) still stand even today. Hudson cars also did very well in races sanctioned by the AAA Contest Board from 1952 until 1954 with Marshall Teague winning the 1952 AAA Stock Car Championship and Frank Mundy in 1953. Often Hudsons finished in most of the top positions in races. Later, these cars met with some success in drag racing, where their high power-to-weight ratio worked to their advantage. Hudsons enjoyed success both in NHRA trials and local dirt track events.

As the post-war marketplace shifted from a seller's to a buyer's market the smaller U.S. automakers, such as Hudson and Nash, found it increasingly difficult to compete with the Big Three (Ford, GM and Chrysler) during the 1950s. A sales war between Ford and General Motors conducted during 1953 and 1954 had left little business for the much smaller "independent" automakers trying to compete against the standard models offered by the domestic Big Three. The Big Three initiated annual styling changes, so that their cars looked fresh every year, whereas the smaller manufacturers could only afford gradual changes. The unit-body construction used by Hudson was difficult and expensive to change. Although Hudsons dominated racing during this period, their feats did little to affect showroom traffic despite incorporating their NASCAR success into a marketing campaign known as "Win on Sunday, Sell on Monday". Sales fell each year from 1951 until 1954, and only Korean War military contracts kept the company solvent. The Hudson Motor Car Company reported a loss of $10,411,060 in 1953 as compared with a profit of $8,307,847 in 1952.

After the company's high-priced Jet compact car line failed to capture buyers in its second straight year, Hudson CEO A.E. Barit engaged with George W. Mason, CEO of Nash-Kelvinator (makers of Nash and Rambler) to discuss the possibility of a merger with Nash. Mason already had the vision of merging the four independent automakers (Nash, Hudson, Packard, and Studebaker) into one company to compete with the Big Three, having floated the idea as early as 1946 with Packard to no avail. Mason had previously discussed the idea with Barit in 1952. On 14 January 1954 an agreement was reached and Nash and Hudson executives took the first steps to bring the two companies together.

== 1954: Merger and initial strategy ==
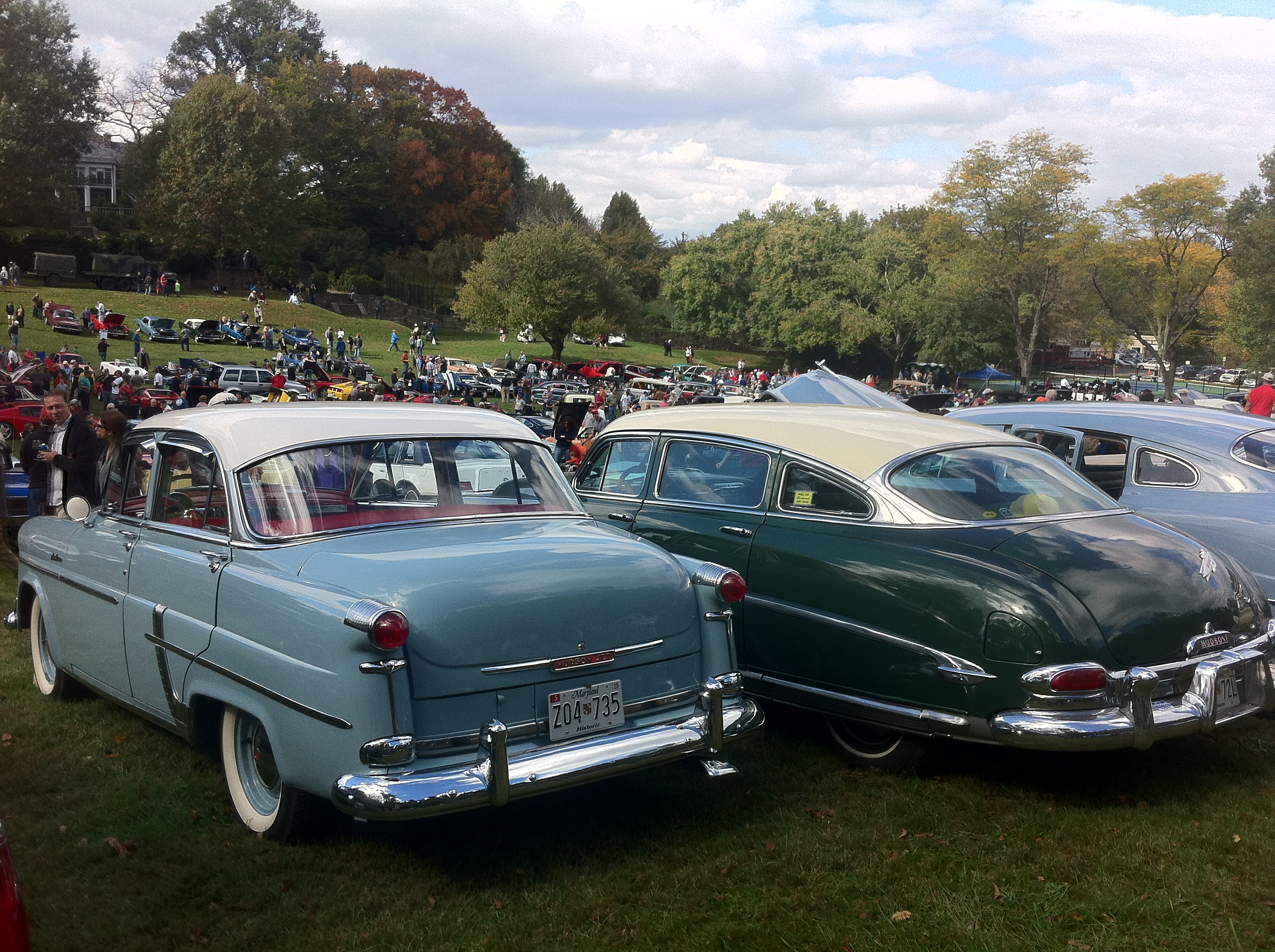
1954 Hudson Jet Liner and 1953 Hudson Hornet

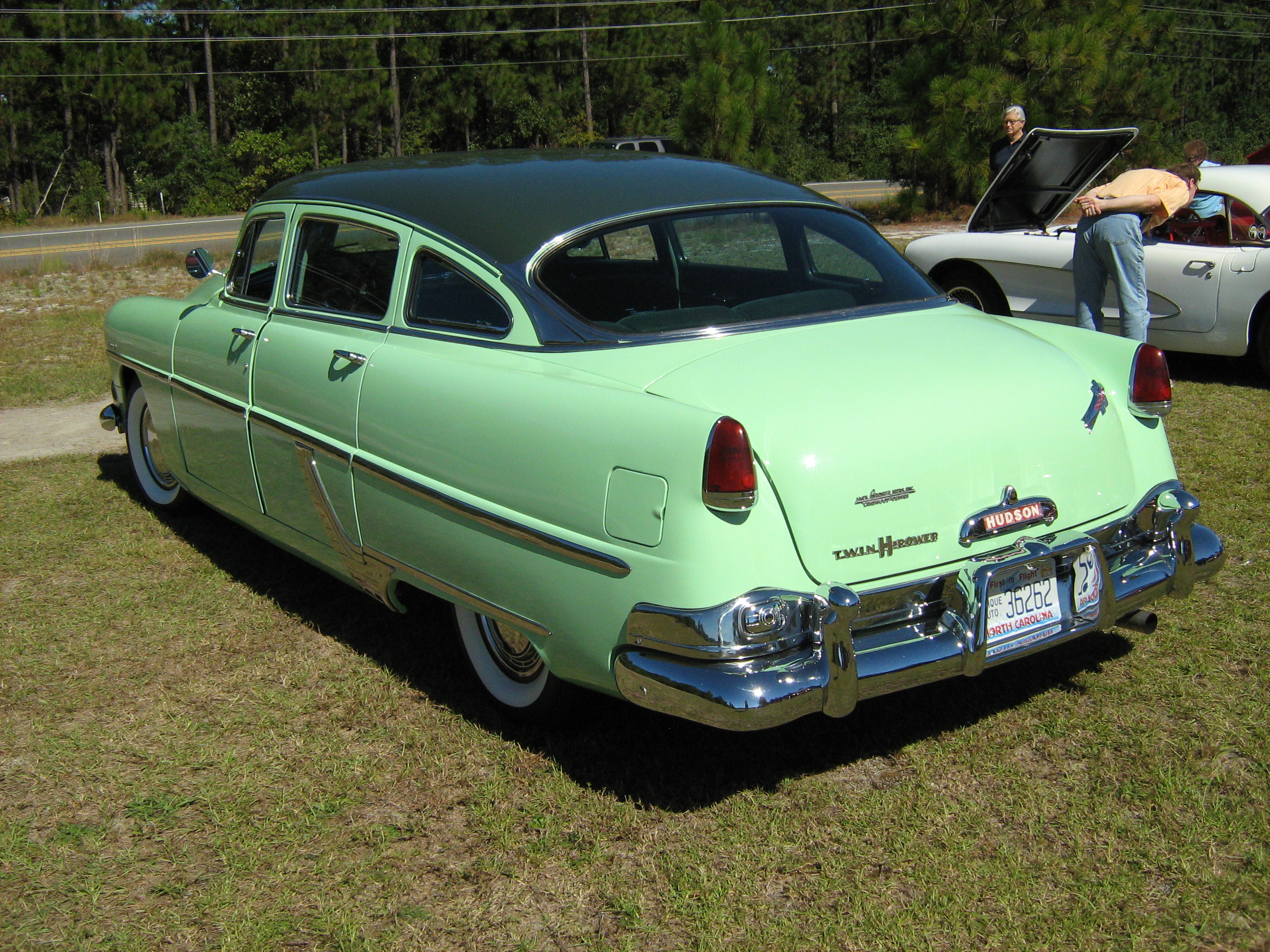
1954 Hudson Hornet updated rear end

The 1954 Hudson "step-down" models received noticeable changes to update their design. Improvements included a one-piece windshield and a redesigned rear end to give them a notchback appearance with a new trunk and rear fenders with fin-type taillamps. Hudson's innovative "step-down" unit-body construction made restyling difficult and expensive. The changes for these 1954 models were a considerable effort by Hudson compared to the Big Three, which could afford constant development and styling changes, so their cars looked fresh every year. Furthermore, the big Hudsons still featured only I6 engines at a time when buyers were moving to V8s offered by the competition. The continuing dominance of the Hudsons in NASCAR racing was sufficient to improve sales. Additionally, the newly introduced compact-sized Jet was not successful in the marketplace. Although it included higher standard equipment, its styling was criticized, and its purchase price was higher than that of the full-sized cars from the Big Three. The 1954 Hudson Jet included only minor trim changes and additional features, but sales declined from its introductory year.

The pivotal moment was on 1 May 1954, when Hudson Motor Car Company officially merged with Nash-Kelvinator to create American Motors Corporation (AMC). Immediately following the merger, significant operational changes were implemented. Hudson's factory in Detroit, Michigan, ceased passenger car production at the end of the 1954 model year and was subsequently converted to military contract production for the Korean War. The next three years of Hudson vehicle production would occur at the former Nash plant in Kenosha, Wisconsin, primarily building rebadged Nash cars under the Hudson brand name. The new company's initial strategy involved Nash focusing most of its marketing resources on its smaller Rambler models, while Hudson would concentrate its marketing efforts on its full-sized cars. The first Hudson model to be discontinued under AMC was the compact Jet, allowing the new company to direct its attention toward the more successful Nash Rambler line. Henceforth, Hudson dealers were supplied with badge-engineered versions of the popular Nash Rambler and Metropolitan compacts to sell as Hudson products and thus meet the state franchise requirements.

One of Mason's priorities as AMC's CEO was to initiate discussions with James J. Nance, president of Packard, regarding potential parts-sharing arrangements between AMC and Packard. This is because AMC did not manufacture a V8 engine. An agreement was forged for the new 320 cu in (5.2 L) Packard V8 engine and Packard's Ultramatic automatic transmission to be utilized in the forthcoming 1955 Nash Ambassador and Hudson Hornet models.

However, the landscape of the independent automakers was rapidly changing. In July 1954, Packard acquired Studebaker, forming the Studebaker-Packard Corporation. Further talks of a broader merger between AMC and Studebaker-Packard were abruptly cut short by Mason's unexpected death on 8 October 1954. A week after Mason's passing, his successor, George W. Romney, publicly announced, "There are no mergers under way either directly or indirectly". Moreover, both company heads were ambitious with domineering natures meaning a tie-up of AMC with Studebaker-Packard would have been problematic. Nevertheless, Romney honored Mason's prior commitment to purchase components from Studebaker-Packard Corporation. However, Studebaker-Packard did not reciprocate by purchasing parts from AMC as initially agreed. Moreover, the outsourced Packard engines and transmissions proved comparatively expensive, prompting AMC to accelerate the development of its own V8 engine, which replaced the outsourced units by mid-1956.

== 1955: Integration and new engine ==
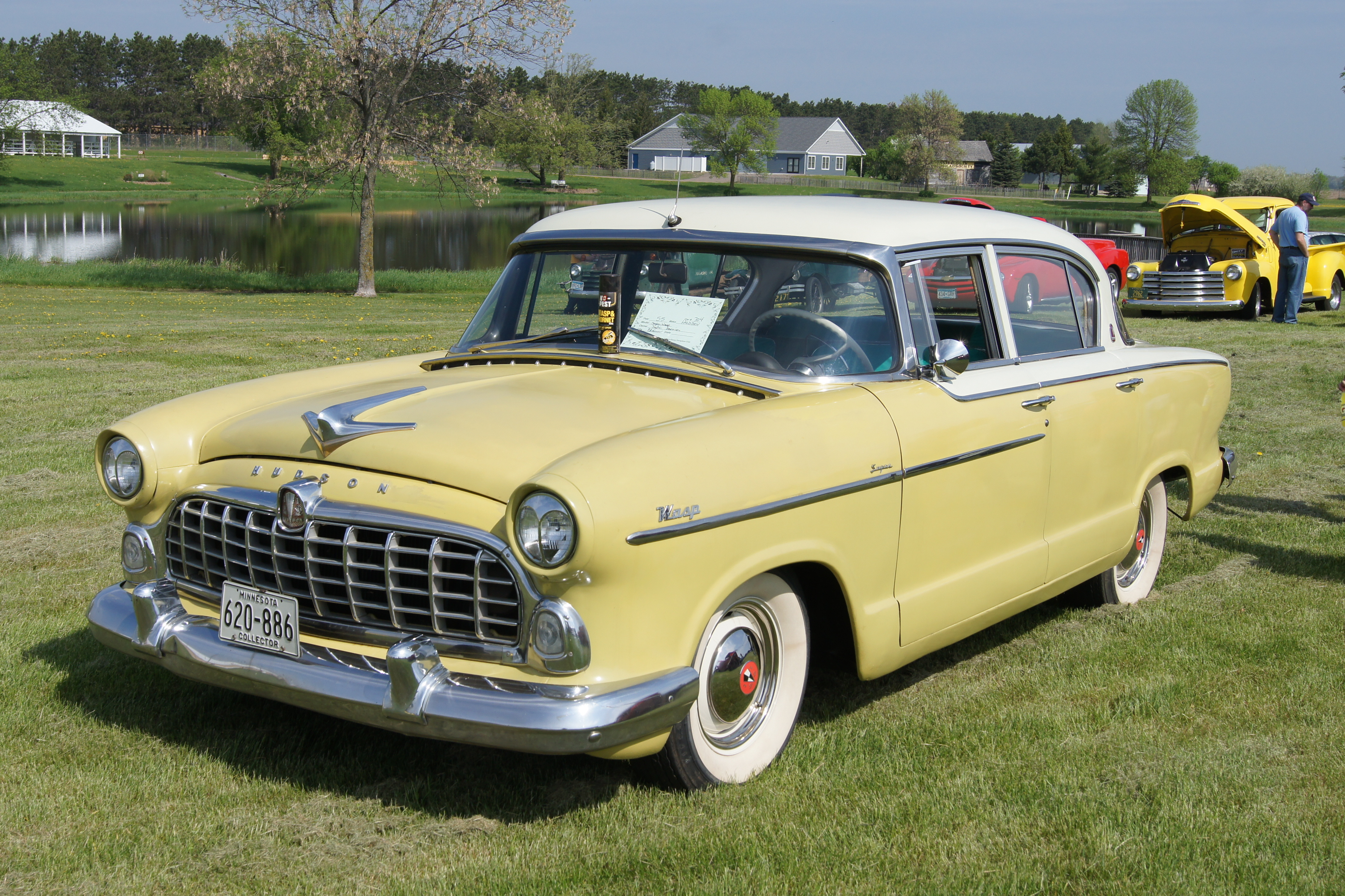
1955 Hudson Wasp

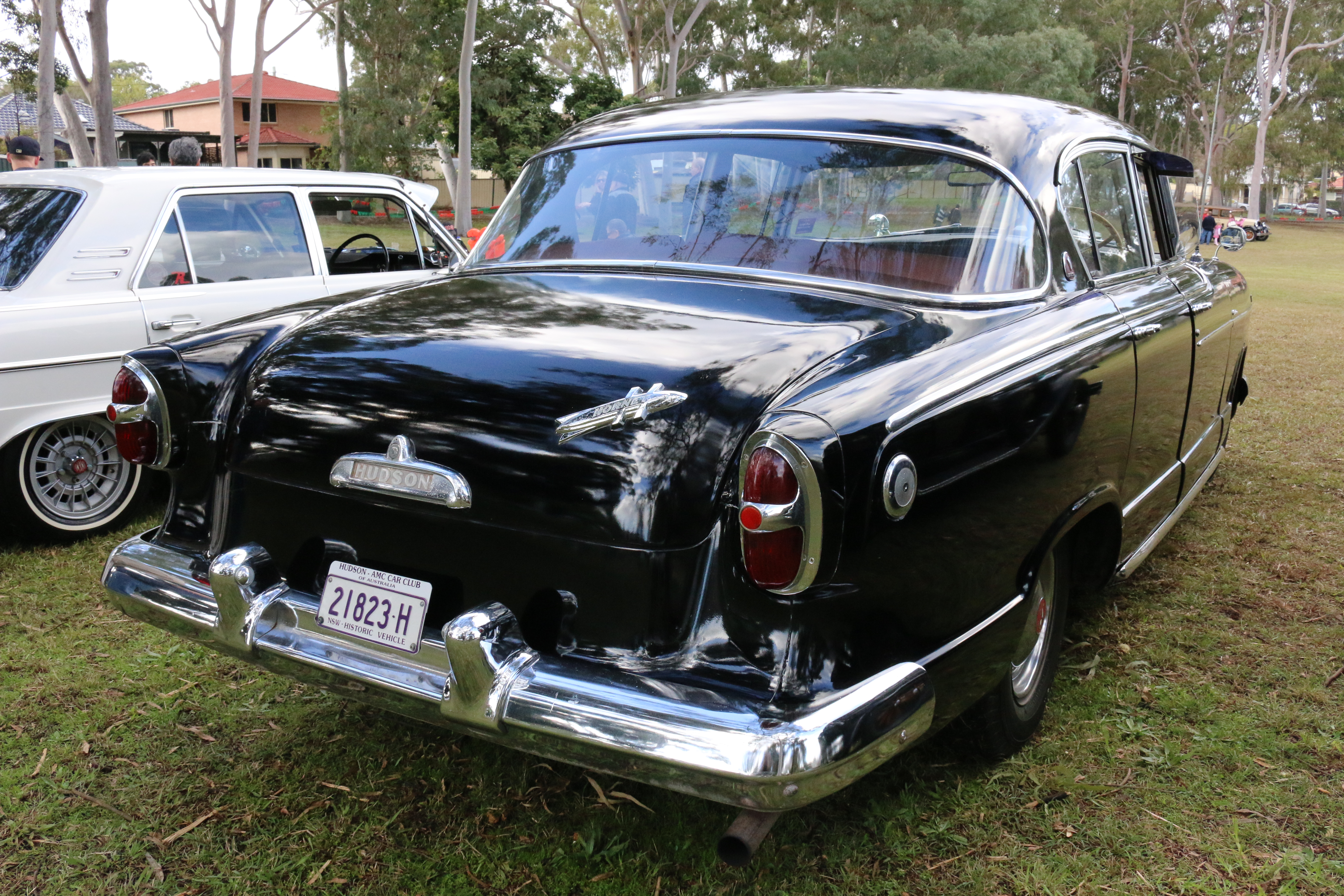
1955 Hudson Hornet

Although the merger of Nash and Hudson operations occurred in 1954, work in the styling department rapidly quickly accelerated. Designs for a 1955 Hudson were progressing while suddenly the efforts were changed to build on a common automobile platform by converting the Nash Ambassador into a Hudson-design. The new head of American Motors, George Mason wanted a new Hudson to be introduced for the 1955 model year. A studio for Hudson was established on the second floor of the AMC headquarters on Plymouth Road in Detroit. Stylists put in many overtime hours to meet Mason's schedule.

For the 1955 model year, Hudson and Nash senior models were made using a technique long utilized by the "Big Three" automakers to achieve economies of scale. This shared body shell incorporated styling themes influenced by a trio of prominent designers: Pinin Farina, Edmund E. Anderson (who established separate design studios for Nash, Hudson, and Rambler within AMC), and Hudson's Frank Spring. Most significantly, the Nash platform did not have the pioneering "Step-Down" design, making the new 1955 Hudsons more upright and taller than the old.

Despite the shared inner body shell with Nash, the 1955 Hudson models retained several distinctive elements to preserve their brand heritage. These included a unique front cowl designed initially by Frank Spring and his Hudson team for the aborted 1954 "step-down" platform, the traditional Hudson dashboard, and the brand's renowned "Triple Safe Brakes". Furthermore, they integrated Nash's highly regarded "Weather Eye" heating and ventilation system, now enhanced with a lower-cost Freon/compressor-type air conditioning unit supplied by Harrison Radiator Corporation.

A significant development for Hudson in 1955 was the first-time offering of a V8 engine. This was the Packard-designed and -built 320 cu in (5.2 L) V8, rated at 208 hp (155 kW). Cars equipped with the V8 had the option of Packard's Ultramatic automatic transmission for an additional $494.

Beyond the senior models, Hudson dealers also began selling the smaller, more economical Rambler and Metropolitan models under the Hudson brand. These were identified as Hudson products through specific badging, including hood/grille emblems and horn buttons featuring the "H" logo. Hudson Ramblers also received "H" symbols on their fuel filler caps and, in 1956, on their hubcaps. A total of 4,357 Metropolitans were sold carrying the Hudson name in 1955.

== 1956: "V-line" styling ==
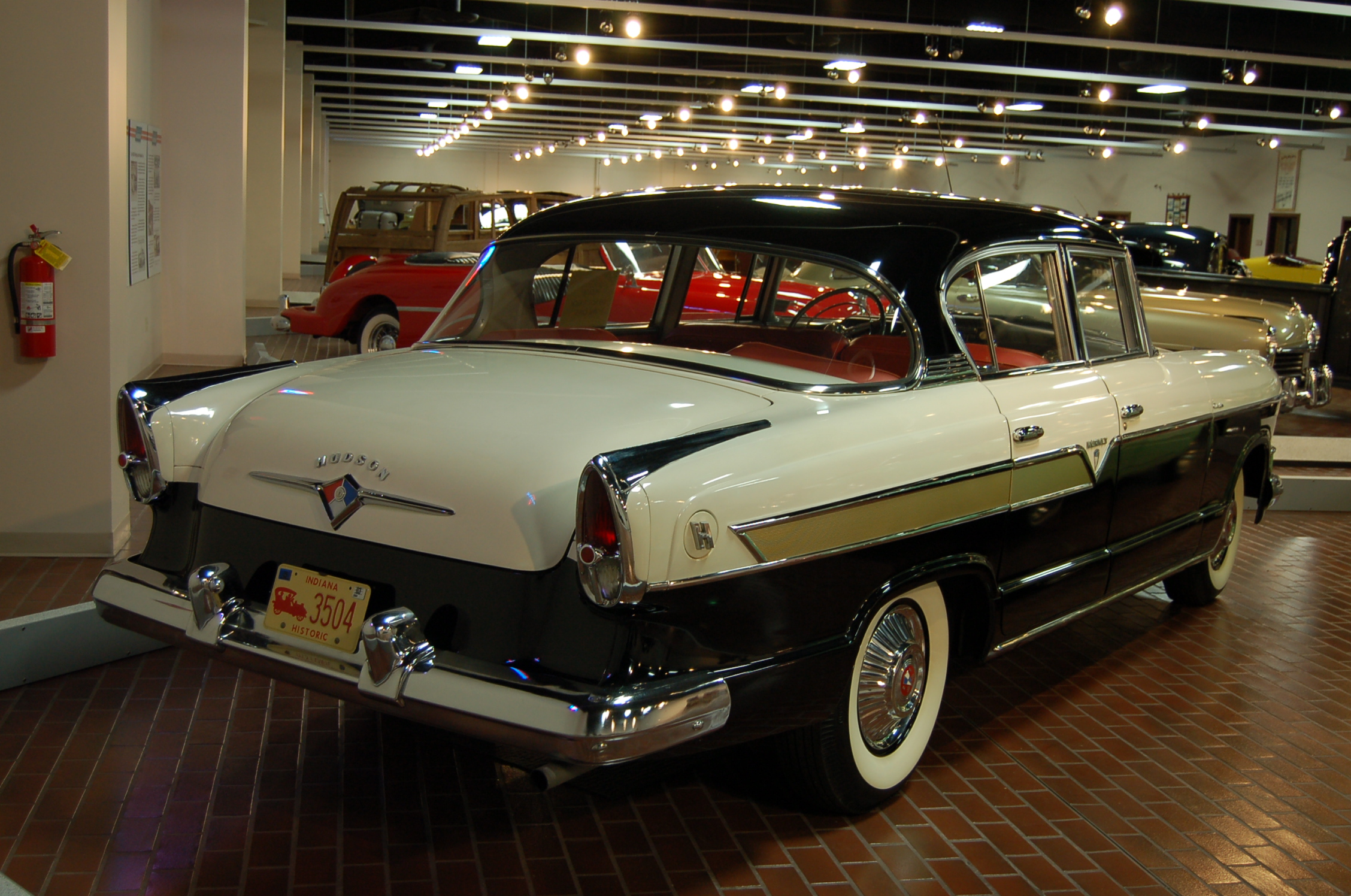
1956 Hudson Hornet

The 1956 model year saw a concerted effort to give the senior Hudsons a more distinct visual identity. The design was entrusted to Richard Arbib, who developed the polarizing "V-Line" styling motif. This design incorporated a combination of "V" themes throughout the car, intended to visually echo Hudson's triangular corporate logo. Despite this unique styling effort, sales for the Hudson brand fell below the 1955 figures, indicating a struggle to capture market share.

The 1956 Hudsons continued to offer the famed 308 cu in (5.05 L) "Hornet Six" engine. This inline-six was available with the optional high-compression cylinder head and the distinctive dual-carburetor manifold, famously known as "Twin-H Power". However, the "Twin-H Power" option would be discontinued at the end of the 1956 model year. The smaller Wasp model utilized the 202 cu in (3.3 L) L-head "Jet Six" engine, producing up to 130 hp [97 kW], and this sedan version proved to be Hudson's top seller for the year. Despite the styling challenges, the Hudson models, with their wider front track compared to their Nash counterparts, were generally regarded as having superior handling characteristics.

Internally, the ongoing consolidation and the perceived diminishing role of the Hudson brand led to dissent. In 1956, former Hudson president A.E. Barit resigned from the AMC Board in protest over the increasing likelihood that the Hudson marque would be phased out of production.

== 1957: Final year ==
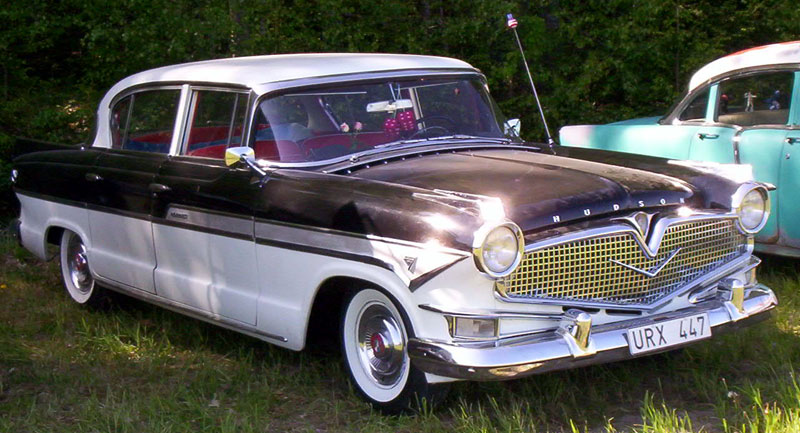
1957 Hornet Series 80 4-Door Sedan

The 1957 model year marked the final chapter for the Hudson brand. AMC further simplified the lineup, dropping the shorter-wheelbase Wasp line entirely. Only the more luxurious Hornet Custom and Hornet Super models were offered, featuring a slightly lowered profile and updated styling cues.

The last Hudson rolled off the Kenosha assembly line on 25 June 1957. However, at that time, there were proposals to continue the Hudson and Nash names into the 1958 model year on the Rambler chassis as deluxe, longer-wheelbase senior models. The combined Nash and Hudson production volume was insufficient to justify all-new design and tooling; therefore, the Rambler's platform was expected to be adopted by the longer cars. One major trade magazine said rumors of discontinuance were false. Reports were that the 1958 Hudsons and Nashes "would be big and smart". Factory styling photographs show designs for a 1958 Hudson (and Nash) line based on a longer-wheelbase 1958 Rambler. Front-end prototype photos show separate Hudson and Nash styling themes.

American Motors' president, George W. Romney, concluded that the only way to compete with the "Big Three" was to stake the future of AMC on a new smaller-sized car line. Neither Hudson nor Nash brand names had as much positive market recognition as the successful Rambler and their sales were lagging. With AMC's chief engineer, Meade Moore, Romney had completely phased out the Nash and Hudson brands at the end of 1957. The decision to retire the brands came so quickly that preproduction photographs of the eventual 1958 Rambler Ambassador show both Nash- and Hudson-badged versions. The Rambler brand was selected for further development and promotion while focusing exclusively on compact cars.

From 1958 onwards, the Rambler and Metropolitan models became independent marques in their own right, no longer identified as part of the Hudson or Nash lineages. While difficult for brand loyalists, this decision allowed AMC to fully concentrate its resources on the successful compact Rambler line, a strategy that would eventually lead to the automaker's resurgence in the late 1950s and early 1960s.

=== Number of vehicles produced by Hudson ===
Year	Production	Export	notes
1909	1,115		
1910	4,107		
1911	5,448		
1912	5,449		
1913	6,221		
1914	7,199		
1915	10,918		
1916	33,186		
1917	21,320		
1918	13,343		
1919	39,286		(includes Essex)
1920	48,439		(includes Essex)
1921	25,415		(includes Essex)
1922	61,233	7,692	
1923	88,184	9,349	
1924	128,664	16,056	
1925	263,937	27,503	
1926	244,667	29,853	
1927	276,330	42,033	
1928	282,152	50,587	
-	-	-	
1948	144,119		
1949	142,462		
1950	142,255		
1951	93,333		
1952	76,354		
1953	77,098		
1954	28,032		
1955	26,623		
1956	7,182		
1957	1,345		

== International markets ==
Hudson, Essex, and Terraplane vehicles were either exported as complete cars or locally built from knock-down kits in many countries making the Hudson marque well-known internationally as well as domestically. In its 1929 report, the banking house Garden Detroit Company reported that in 1928 Hudson shipped 50,587 vehicles overseas, or 17.9% of total production. By March 1929 Hudson had topped all previous production figures having exported 44,295 cars in March alone, bringing the total of shipments for the first quarter of 1929 to an all-time high of 108,298.

=== Australia ===
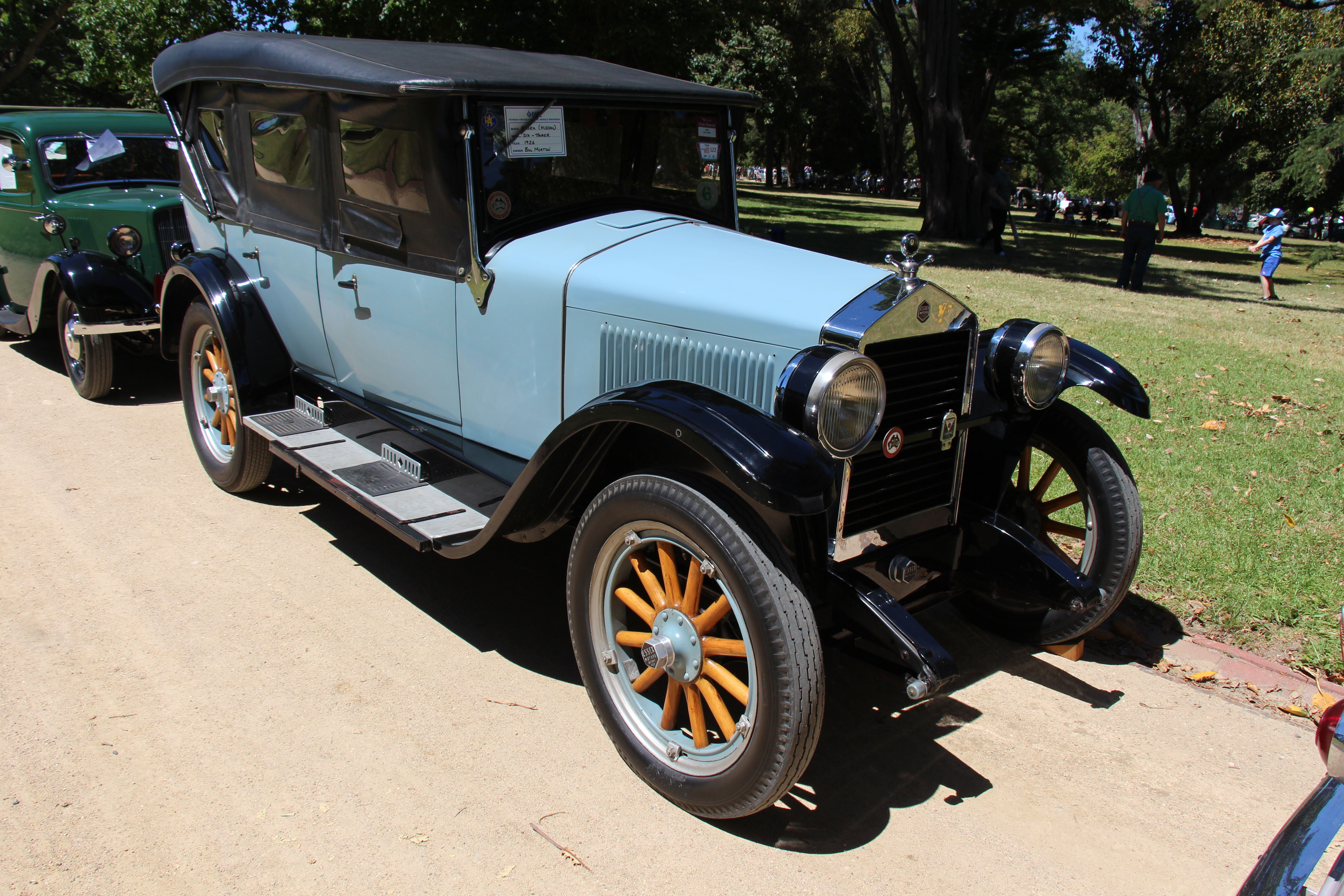
Australian-market 1926 Essex Six Tourer

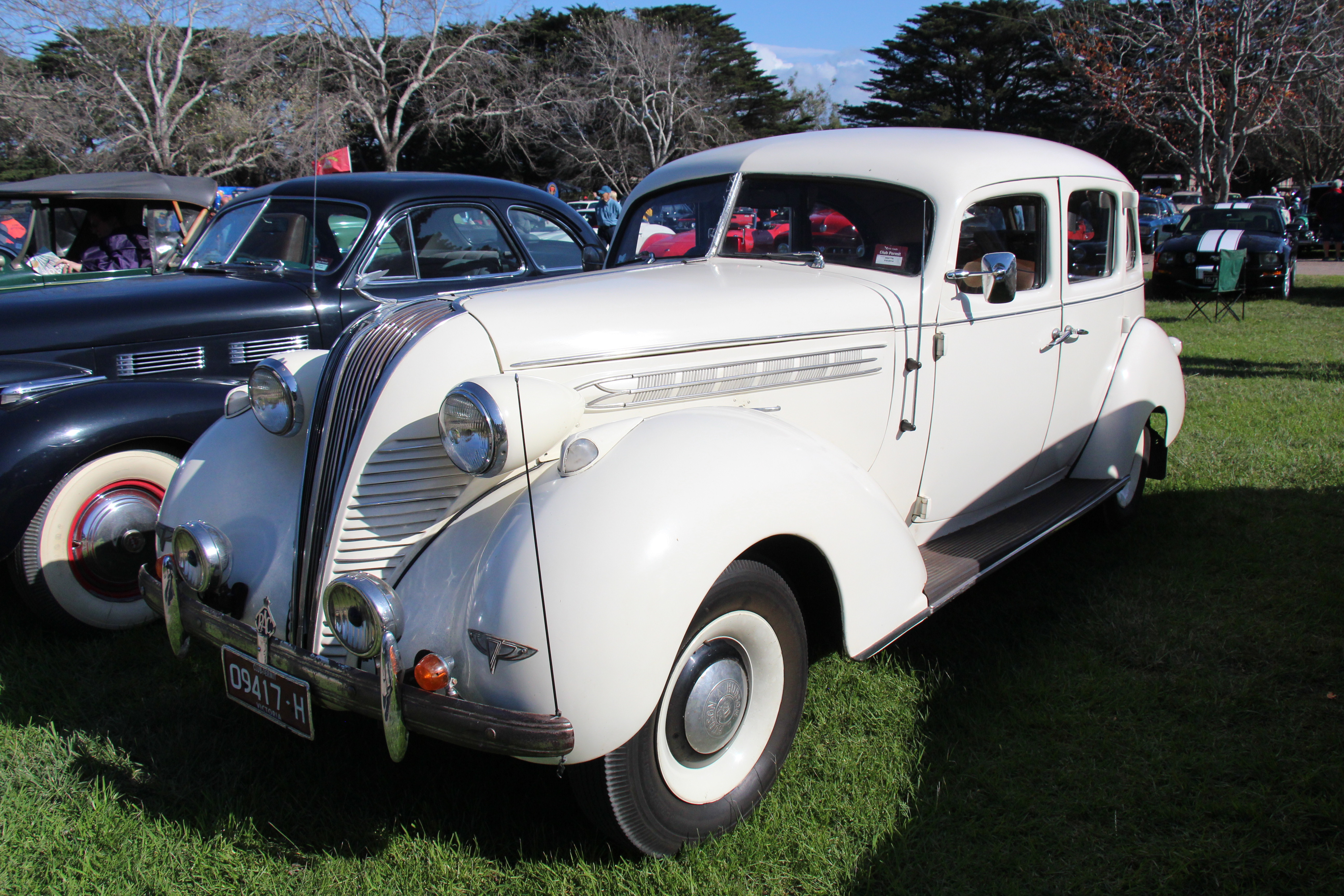
Australian 1937 Hudson Terraplane with body built by Ruskin Motor Works

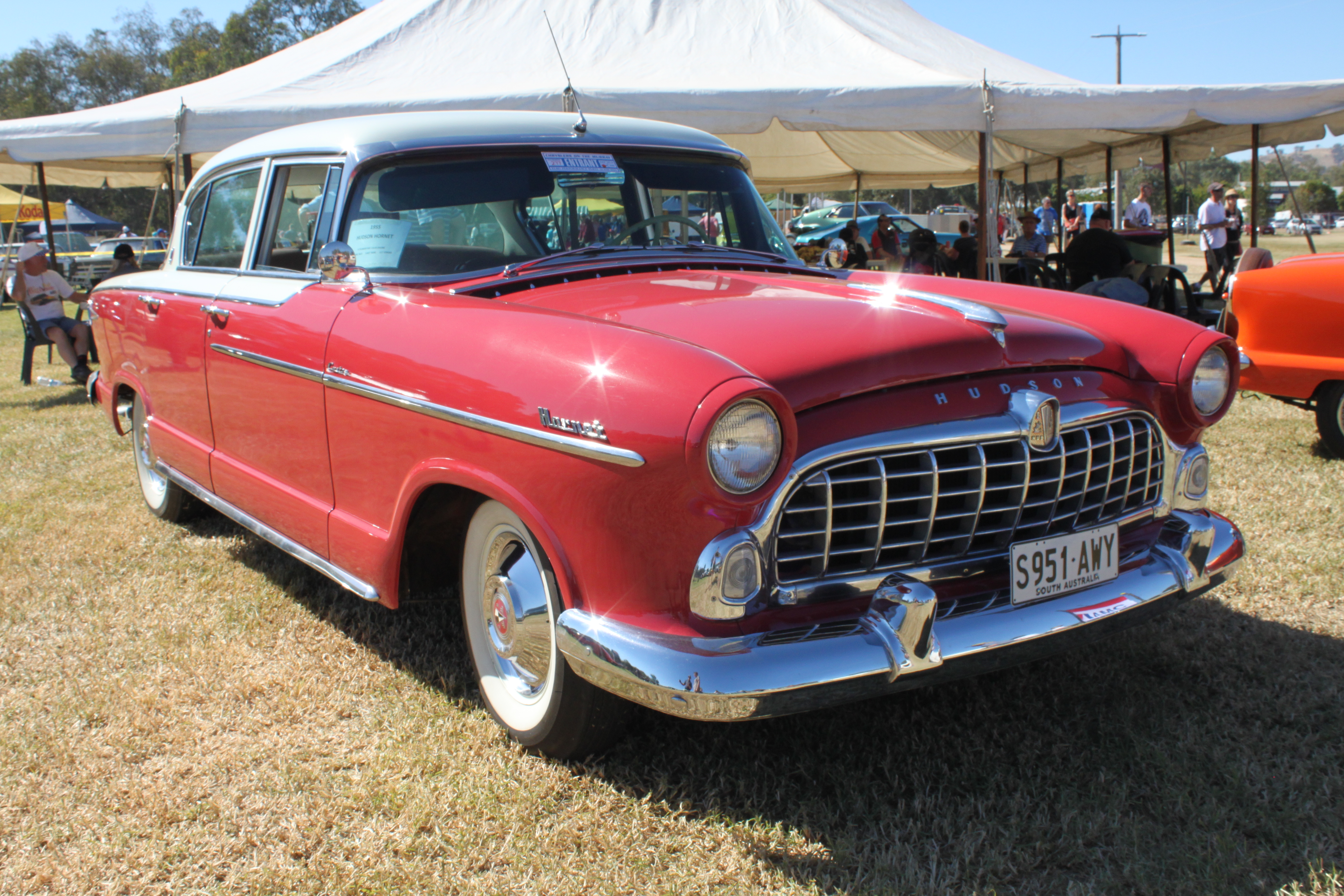
1955 Hudson Hornet (Australia)

Hudson vehicles were imported into Australia in 1913 by Brisbane company McGhie Motor Company.

In 1915 the Sydney branch of Dalgety & Co. Ltd became the distributor of Hudson (and later Essex) vehicles for New South Wales. The company was also the agent for Wolseley, Daimler, and Buick passenger vehicles as well as Lacre and Halley commercial vehicles. Motor bodies were produced by Messrs Henderson, Boulton, and Kirkham in Regent Street, Sydney. The company also did trimming, fitting, painting, mechanical work, and repairs.

Established in 1922, Sydney company Smith & Waddington set up motor vehicle body building operations for NSW and Queensland at premises on Parramatta Road, Camperdown. The company built "custom" car bodies which, by the terminology of the day, meant "built to an individual order and to a special design." In addition to assembling Hudson and Essex for Dalgety, the company also built vehicle bodies for Rolls-Royce, Wolseley, Dort, Benz, Fiat, and Turkat Méry. After a slump in the economy which caused operations to cease in November 1927, Smith & Waddington resumed production in June 1928, again building Hudson and Essex vehicles for NSW and Queensland, and further adding Dodge, Chrysler, Erskine, and Studebaker for the whole of Australia. Additionally, Sydney coach builder G.H. Olding & Sons are known to have built six Terraplane phaetons for Dalgety in 1934.

In 1926 a new company, Leader Motors Limited was formed to be the exclusive distributor of Hudson and Essex motor vehicles in Queensland. The bodies were made by South Australian company Holden's Motor Body Builders in Brisbane. In its main facility of Adelaide, Holden also made motor bodies for Austin, Buick, Chevrolet, Chrysler, Cleveland, Dodge, Fiat, Oakland, Oldsmobile, Overland, Pontiac, Reo, Studebaker, Vauxhall, and Willys Knight. In 1927 Holden's produced 1252 Essex Standard Tourers, 173 Essex Special Tourers, 171 Essex Coaches, and 46 Essex S/S Roadsters. In the same year the company manufactured 8 Hudson Tourers. 1928 was the last year of Hudson and Essex production by Holden's. In 1930 Holden's was bought out by General Motors.

Hudson and Essex assembly began in Victoria by Neal's Motors of Port Melbourne in 1927. The contract to build the bodies was initially given to TJ Richards & Sons of Keswick, Adelaide to supply for Victoria, South Australia, Western Australia, and Tasmania as well as acting as a second source of supply for New South Wales and Queensland. Holden's Motor Body Builders also built bodies. Holden's records show that for 1927 the Adelaide plant built 1,641 Essex vehicles and 8 Hudsons, and for 1928 a total of 1,931 Essex vehicles and 59 Hudsons were assembled. Holden's final year for Hudson and Essex production was in 1928, and in 1931 the company was bought out by General Motors.

In February 1934 Ruskins Body Works of West Melbourne secured the contract to build Hudson and Terraplane bodies for the whole of Australia. In June 1937, Neal's Motors celebrated assembling its 30,000th automobile: a 1937 Hudson Terraplane.

In 1939 Dalgety sold their automotive business to agent for Packard motor vehicles, Ira L. & A.C Berk in Sydney, which thereafter became the distributors for Hudson in NSW and QLD. The company opened a manufacturing plant in Belmore, Sydney in February 1949.

After the end of World War II, Australia legislated to restrict the use of U.S. dollars which were in desperately short supply. The use of U.S. dollars to import cars thereafter required a government permit restricting the purchase of American cars only to those with access to U.S. funds held overseas such as consular staff and visiting entertainers. Despite this, Australian distributors of Hudson, Nash, Packard, and Studebaker were able to bring in limited numbers of US-built, factory right-hand-drive vehicles from 1946.

A report by Dunlop Australia about Australian car sales from 1932 until 1949 noted that Hudson vehicles (including Essex and Terraplane) totaled 10,424 units during the 17-years, coming in at 13th place overall. It was noted in the report generally that all marques in Australia experienced the greatest number of sales before World War II.

In 1960, six years after the merger of Hudson and Nash-Kelvinator to form American Motors Corporation, Australian Motor Industries (AMI) of Port Melbourne would form an agreement with AMC to assemble Ramblers in Australia.

=== Canada ===
Canadian assembly of Hudson vehicles commenced in 1932 by Hudson Motors of Canada in Tilbury, Ontario. The factory building was owned by Canadian Top & Body Co. which built the motor bodies for the vehicles. The first models assembled were a series of Hudson Eights. World War II interrupted operations and production ceased in 1941. Post-war operations resumed in 1950, with Hudsons being assembled by Chatco Steel Products in Tilbury, Ontario. Operations ceased in 1954 following the Nash-Hudson merger that led to the formation of American Motors Corporation. Toronto-based Nash Motors of Canada Ltd. became American Motors (Canada) Ltd. and all subsequent AMC operations continued in Toronto until its closure in 1957. Local production of Ramblers resumed after AMC's Brampton, Ontario plant opened in December 1960.

=== Germany ===
Hudson and Essex vehicles were assembled in Berlin, Germany, during the 1920s by Hudson Essex Motors Company m.b.H Berlin-Spandau. The cars were built with the speedometer in kilometers, while the fuel, oil, and temperature gauges remained in their original non-metric units.

=== New Zealand ===
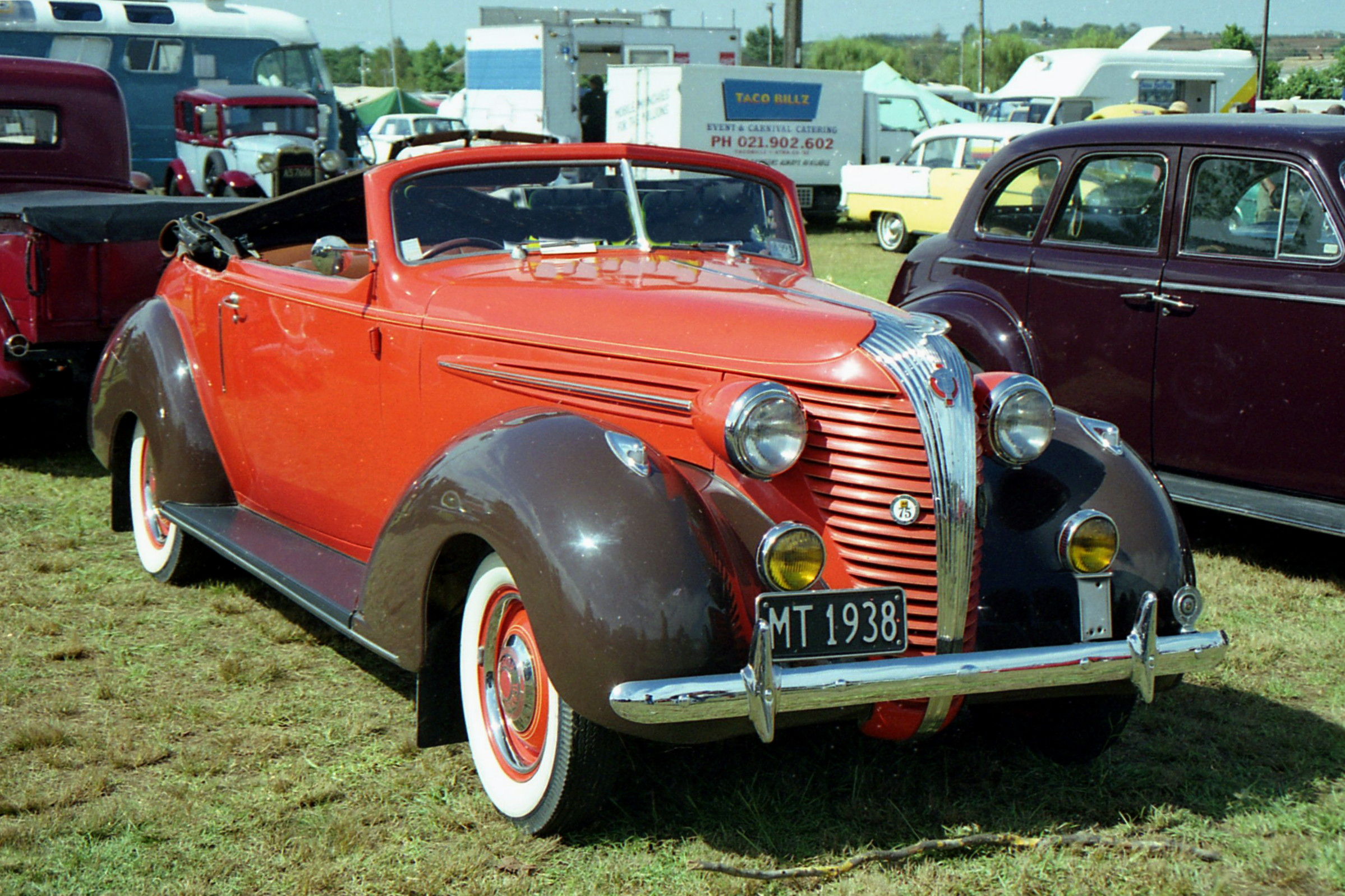
1938 Hudson Terraplane convertible (New Zealand)

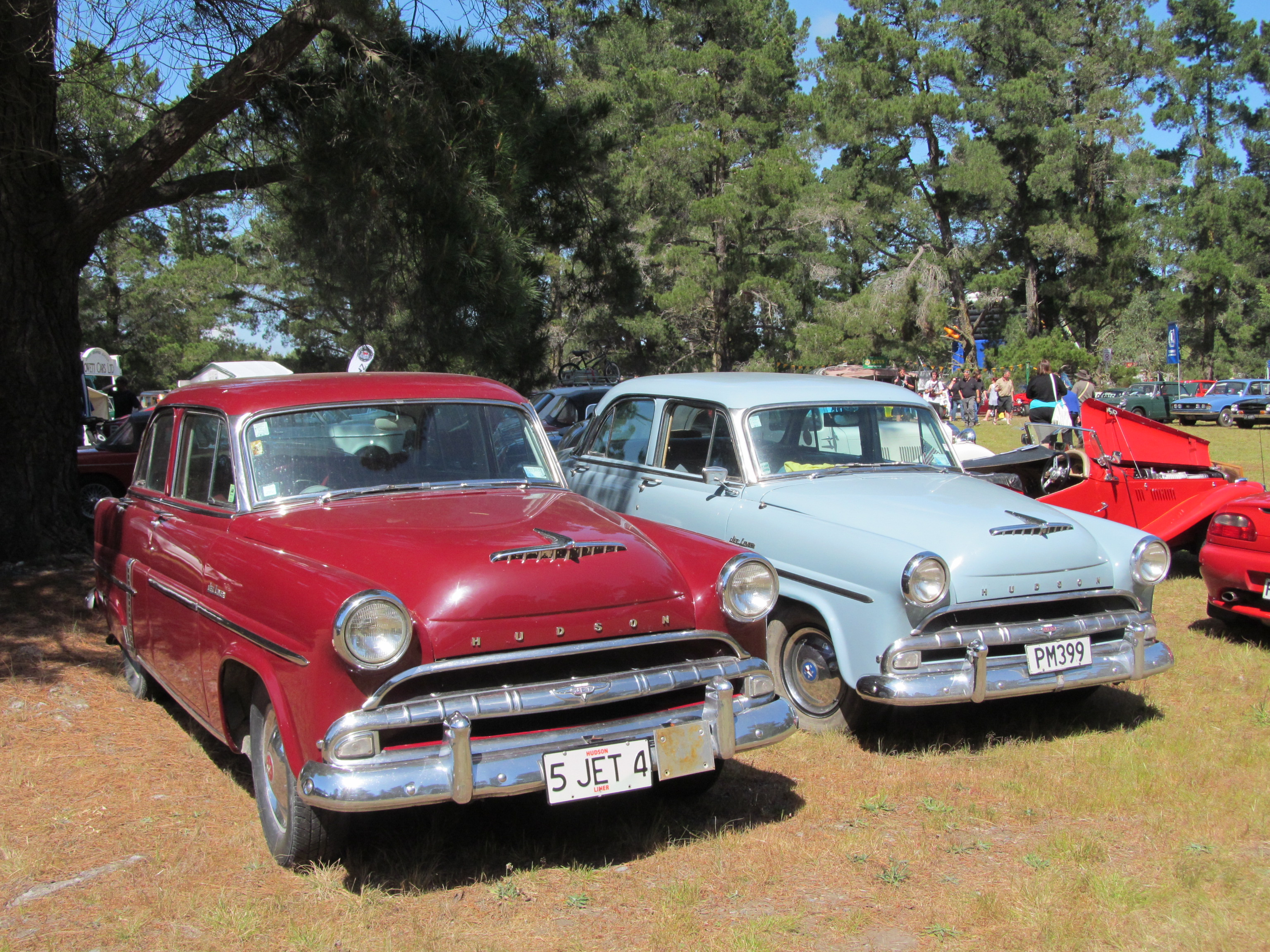
Two right-hand-drive 1954 Hudson Jetliners, either locally built or fully imported by Motor Holdings (New Zealand)

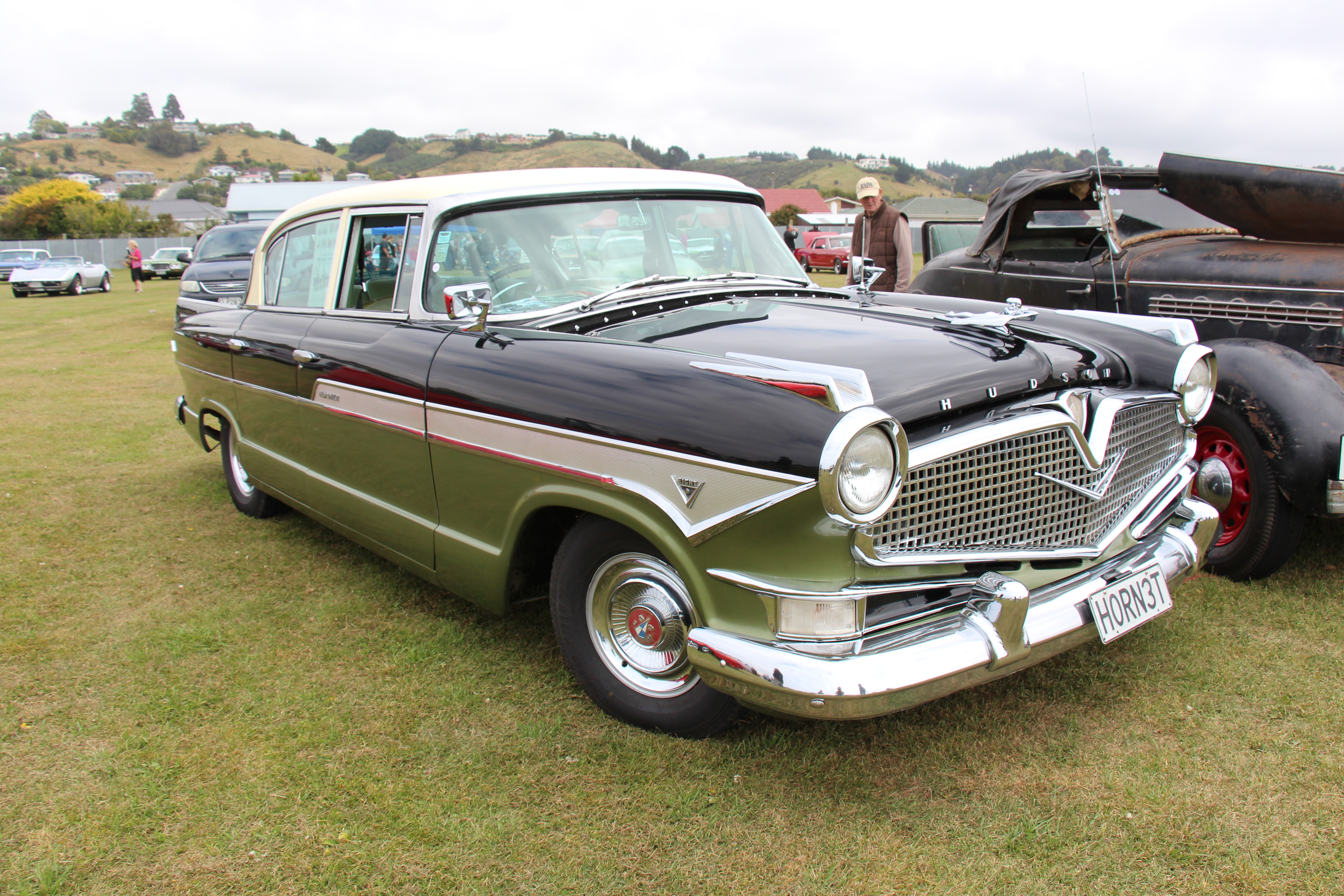
1957 right-hand-drive Hudson Hornet V8 sedan (New Zealand)

Hudson and Essex vehicles were imported into North Island by Dominion Motors of Wellington which began operations in 1912. Dominion Motors amalgamated with Universal Motor Company of Christchurch in 1919 forming an assembly operation for Hudson and Essex as well as Oldsmobile, Crossley, Chevrolet, Stutz, Rolls-Royce, and (pre-GM) Vauxhall. Vehicles were assembled and finished in-house from partial knock-down kits.

For South Island, Hudson and Essex vehicles were imported by W.G. Vining Limited of Nelson, beginning in 1912. Vining had built a 31,500 sq ft (2,930 m^{2}) garage in 1908 which was the largest garage in New Zealand at the time. A car assembly plant was established at the premises and shortly thereafter Vinings obtained licenses to import and assemble Cadillac, Maxwell, Haynes, and Ford vehicles from the United States; Bean cars from the United Kingdom; and Darracq and Unic vehicles from France. Along with Hudson and Essex, the plant later assembled Chevrolet and Rover vehicles. The business ceased when it was sold on 30 September 1927 upon W.G. Vining's retirement. Vining's son formed a new business, P. Vining & Scott, and continued the Hudson and Essex franchise, adding Morris in 1932.

New Zealand car sales for the first nine months of 1927 saw Essex in third place with 898 vehicles sold, behind Chevrolet in second place with 1,100 vehicles sold, and Ford in first place with 1651 vehicles sold. Hudson made 12th place with 206 sales.

From 1935, Hudson vehicles (along with Nash, Studebaker, and Standard) were assembled by Christchurch company Motor Assemblies Limited. Production ended when the company was acquired by Standard-Triumph International in 1954. Hudson production then went to Motor Holdings Ltd which had been founded in 1936 as the Zealand franchise of Jowett Motors. After Jowett's closure in the United Kingdom in 1954, Motor Holdings won the Volkswagen franchise, and its Auckland operation was renamed VW Motors for the production of VWs in New Zealand. VW Motors assembled Hudsons as a secondary line. Some were fully imported as special orders.

After the Hudson and Nash marques were discontinued by American Motors Corporation, VW Motors assembled AMC's new Rambler motor vehicles at its new Otahuhu Volkswagen plant from 1958 until 1962. AMC formed an agreement in 1963 with Campbell Motor Industries (CMI) of Thames to assemble Ramblers, production of which ran from 1964 until 1971.

=== South Africa ===
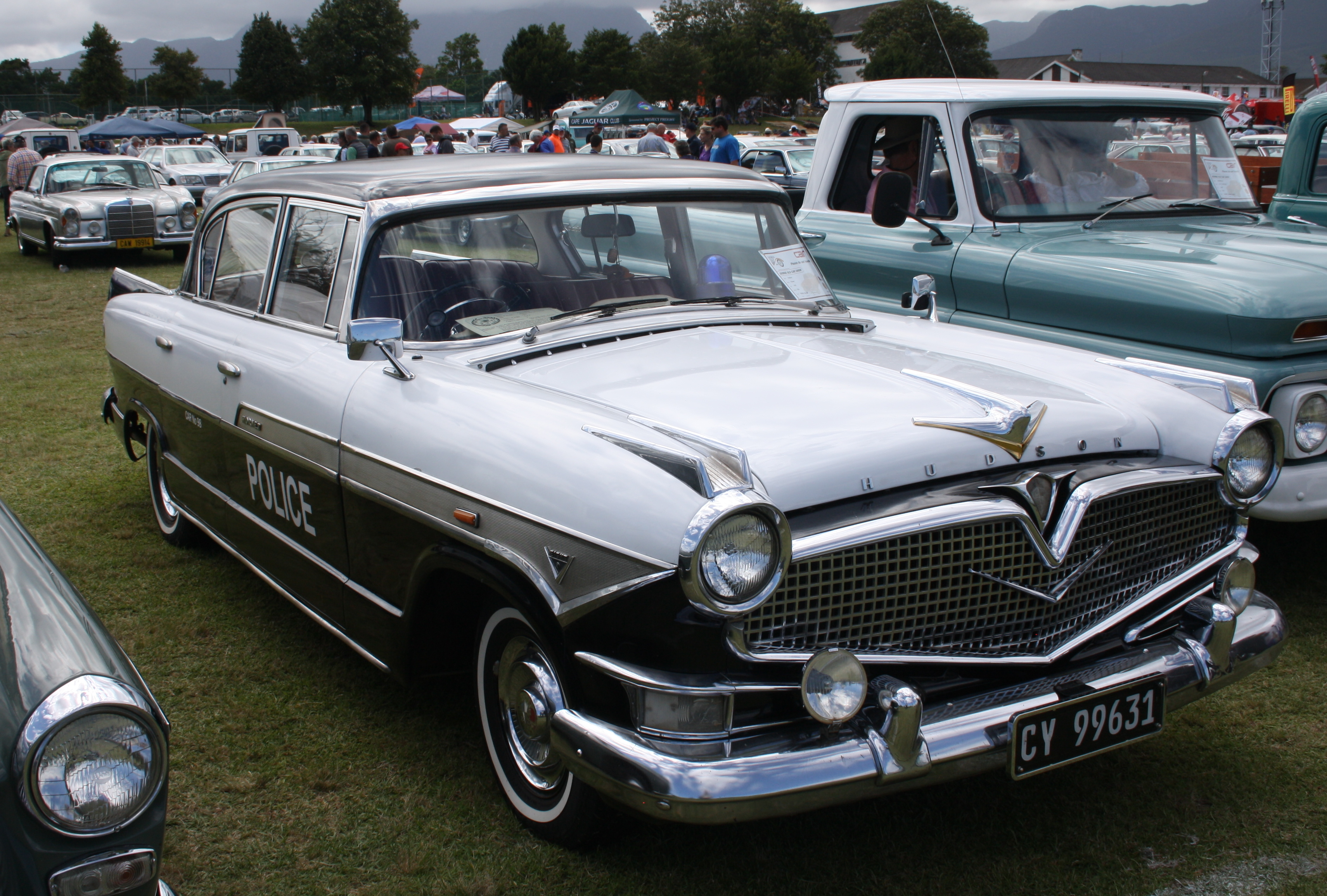
1957 Hudson Hornet (South Africa)

Beginning in the 1920s, Hudson and Willys motor vehicles were assembled in South Africa from right-hand-drive complete knock-down (CKD) kits sourced from Canada by Stanley Motors at their plant, National Motor Assemblers (NMA), in Natalspruit (Gauteng). After World War II, NMA built Austin, Standard, and Triumph vehicles at different times.

After the formation of American Motors Corporation in 1954, NMA continued to assemble AMC Ramblers until 1967.

=== United Kingdom ===
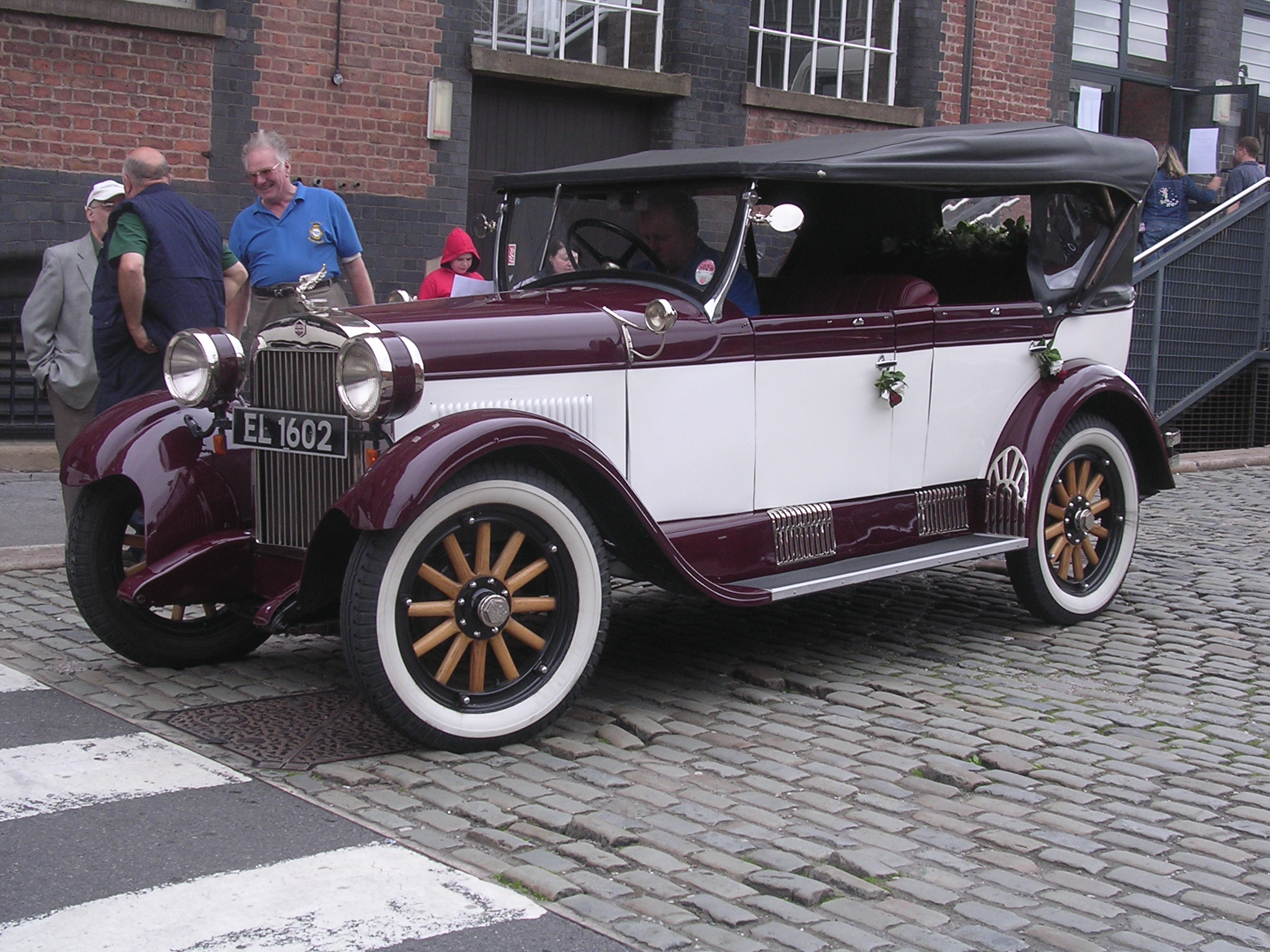
1928 Essex Tourer, built by Hudson-Essex Motors in London

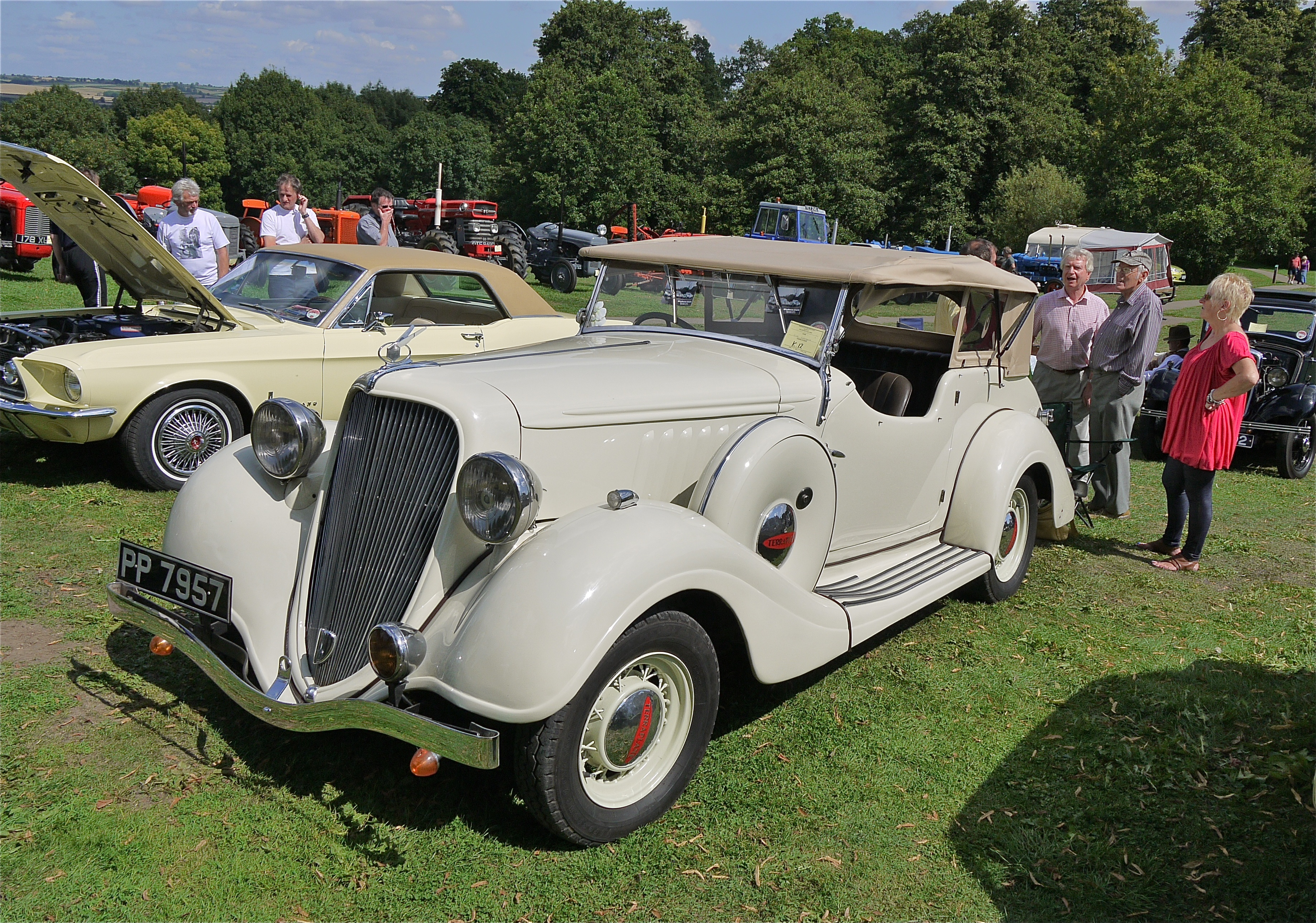
English-built 1934 Hudson Terraplane Tourer

Hudsons were introduced to the United Kingdom in 1911. No shipments were possible during the First World War but as soon as the Armistice was signed exports resumed to the U.K. Hudsons and Essex vehicles were sold through ten concessionaires.

In 1922 Hudson-Essex Motors of Great Britain Limited was formed, with new premises on Dordrecht Road, in Acton Vale. Over 100 agents were appointed to sell the vehicles resulting in 2,000 sales in the next 12 months.

In 1926 a factory was built on a 4.5 acres (1.8 ha) property next to the recently opened Great West Road in Brentford. The plant opened in 1927 and a year later a three-story building was built as a service department for Hudson and Essex vehicles. The factory assembled the vehicle chassis locally, but the bodies were imported as complete units from Detroit.

From 1932, the bodies came over from the United States in sections to be assembled at the Great West Road factory. After the Essex marque was retired in 1932 the British company was renamed Hudson Motors Ltd.

Hudson's new Terraplane model was equally as popular in the U.K. as it was in the United States. English-designed and built bodies were built on the Terraplane frames and the cars were entered in many automobile races including the Monte Carlo Rally. Some of the cars entered were driven by personnel from the Great West Road factory. A Hudson Pacemaker won first place in the 1931 Scottish Rally and another Pacemaker took 7th place in the 1932 Torquay Rally. The Team Award was won by two Terraplane tourers and a Terraplane saloon in the 1933 Scottish Rally.

A triangular site from the railway was developed in 1926 for a new Hudson-Essex factory. This was the first major industrial facility and became a major employer along the Great West Road. Other firms followed to establish what became known as the "Golden Mile." The Chiswick Roundabout (the junction of Chiswick High Road, North Circular Road, South Circular Road, and the A4 Great West Road) also became known as "Hudson's Corner." After World War II, the property was used by the Kelvinator Refrigerator Company.

After the Hudson and Nash merger, the British company became a subsidiary of American Motors Corporation and was renamed Rambler Motors (A.M.C.) Limited in 1961, taking over from Nash Concessionaires Ltd. as the importer of AMC's new Rambler vehicles. The company imported AMC vehicles, many in factory right-hand-drive, well into the 1970s.

== Legacy ==
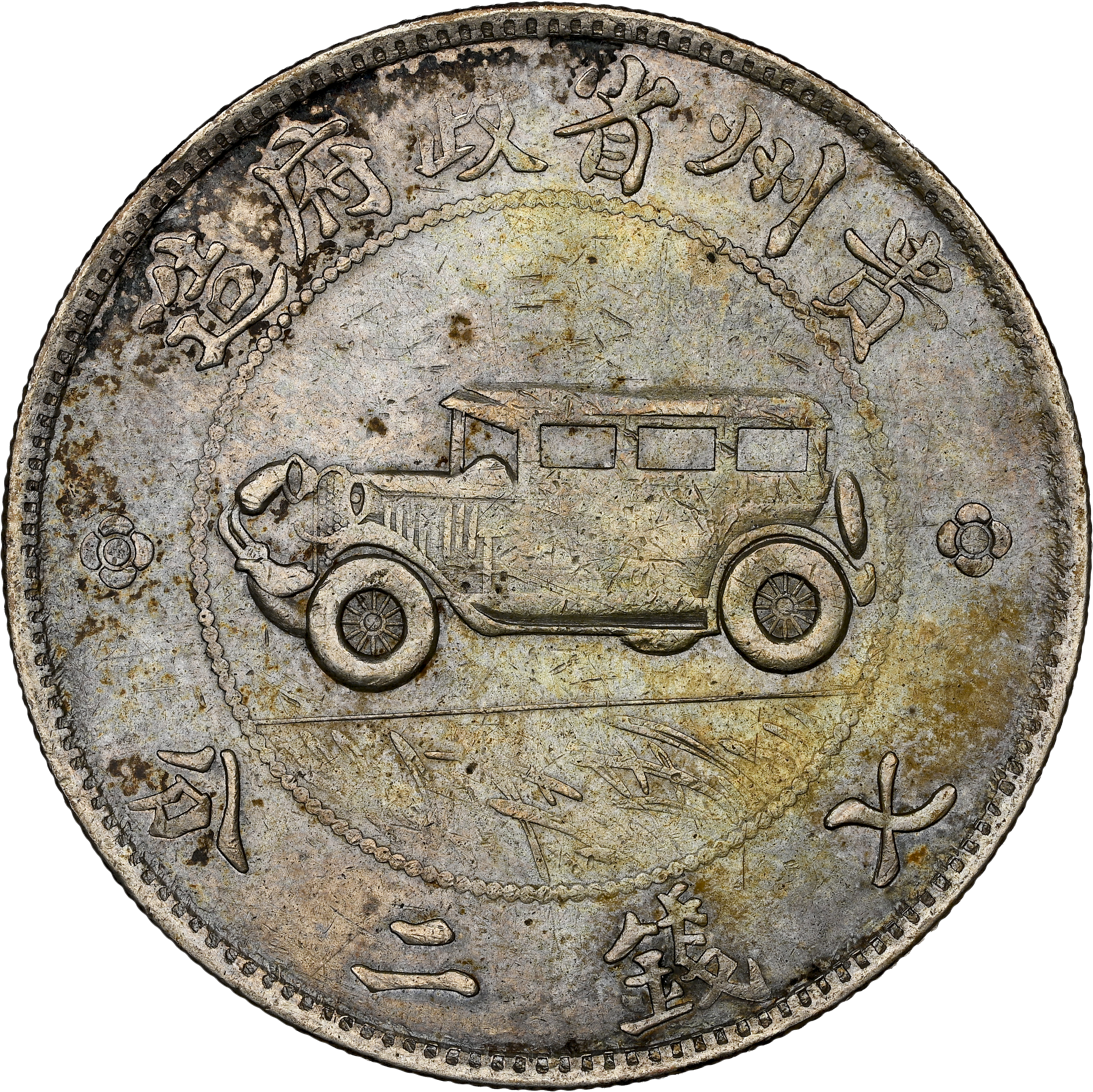
The Auto Dollar features an image of a car reminiscent of a Hudson model.

In 1928, a one yuan coin called the Auto Dollar was minted by the Chinese warlord Zhou Xicheng to commemorate the construction of roadways in Guizhou province. The coin features an image of an automobile reminiscent of a soft-topped Hudson car, although it does not correspond to any particular model exactly.

For the 1970 model year, American Motors revived the "Hornet" model name for its new series of compact cars (the AMC Hornet). AMC was later purchased by Chrysler, which at one time considered reintroducing the Hornet name in the Dodge model line and ultimately did so for the 2023 model year with a car based on the Alfa Romeo Tonale.

The last Hudson dealership was Miller Motors in Ypsilanti, Michigan, which is now part of the Ypsilanti Automotive Heritage Museum.

The Hostetler Hudson Auto Museum in Shipshewana, Indiana, featured a collection of restored Hudsons. Eldon Hostetler was an inventor who owned a Hudson as a teenager and later purchased Hudson cars and restored them. The museum closed in 2018 after the Hudson Automobile Museum Board voted in favor of closing the museum and liquidating the collection.

A restored Hudson Dealership sign still occupies its original site on Highway 32 in Chico, California.
