= Biddle and Smart =

American carriage and automobile body manufacturer

Biddle and Smart was a manufacturer of carriages and then automobile bodies based in Amesbury, Massachusetts. It started as a successful carriage manufacturer before making the transition to auto body manufacturer in 1905.

== History ==
=== Carriagemakers ===
The town of Amesbury, Massachusetts, was a centre of carriage-making. Biddle and Smart began trading either in 1870 or 1880. An almost-contemporary source says that The Biddle, Smart Carriage Co. was formed by William E. Biddle, William W. Smart, and M. D. F. Steeve in 1878 and began production two years later.

=== Automobile bodies ===
In 1905, Biddle and Smart became one of the first carriagemakers in Amesbury to begin the manufacture of automobile bodies. An early customer was the Club Car Company of New York City and from 1910 to 1911, the firm was the builder of Club’s cars. In 1917 Biddle and Smart purchased the factory of S.R. Bailey & Co., allowing greater production.

By the early 1920s customers included Hudson, for whom they began making closed bodies in 1923. From 1923 the company became the exclusive producer of car bodies for Hudson, a turning point that would see production triple with 12,000 bodies manufactured in 1923. With expansion Biddle and Smart acquired a number of local coachbuilders, including Currier Cameron & Co., Hollander & Morrill Body Co., Witham Body Co., T. W. Lane Company, Auto Body & Finishing Co., and Bryant Body Co. This brought the total space to nearly a half million square feet in 21 buildings in six different sections of town.

In 1925, Biddle & Smart began making bodies for Rolls-Royce of America at Springfield, Massachusetts. The company had fulfilled a small order for Rolls-Royce previously in 1919.

In May 1925, Hudson introduced the Biddle & Smart-built Brougham, a closed-coupled four-door sedan with blind rear quarters covered, as was the entire roof in black leather. The Brougham was an immediate success and was continued into 1926 and 1927 with some modifications.

In addition to Hudson and Rolls-Royce, Biddle and Smart also built bodies for Lincoln, Peerless, Marmon, Mercer, White, Chalmers, Speedwell and Haynes.

By March 1926 its Amesbury holdings had grown from nine shops to 41 shops and the output had grown to 400 bodies manufactured a day. Peak shipments came in 1926 when the firm delivered 41,000 bodies to Hudson. An inability to stamp steel meant that their products were made using aluminium.

== Demise ==
In 1926 Hudson opened a brand new 10 million dollar body plant in Detroit. By the end of 1926 all steel-bodied Hudsons were being built at the new plant, and because of the inability of Biddle and Smart to produce steel bodies, production for Hudson dropped by 60%.

Hudson continued with the aluminum bodies from Biddle and Smart, advertising them as "custom-built" bodies even though they were exactly the same as the steel body models built at the Hudson factory. Hudson produced a range of cars designed by Walter M. Murphy Co. of Pasadena, California after 1927 and these were built by Biddle and Smart, advertised as "Design by Murphy." Production continued until 1929. 10 Hudson body styles were sold in 1929 with Biddle and Smart producing two, Detroit-based Briggs Manufacturing Company producing three, and Hudson producing the other five models inhouse.

At the end of December 1929 Hudson declined to renew its yearly contract. The beginning of the Great Depression saw car prices decline and transport costs from Massachusetts to Detroit become cost prohibitive. Hudson had to resort to local producers such as Briggs Manufacturing Co.

1930 was the last year of Biddle and Smart production for Hudson, leaving the company with no customers by the end of the year. After a failed attempt at marketing aluminum boats the company went out of business in 1930.
