= Junk dollar =

Chinese coin

- Value: One yuan (壹圓)
- Mass: 27 g (0.95 oz) g
- Diameter: 39.5 mm (1.56 in)
- Thickness: 2.5 mm (0.1 in)
- Edge: reeded
- Composition: silver, 0.880 fineness
- Years of minting: 1933–1935, 1948–1949
- Mintage: about 179,400,000

Obverse
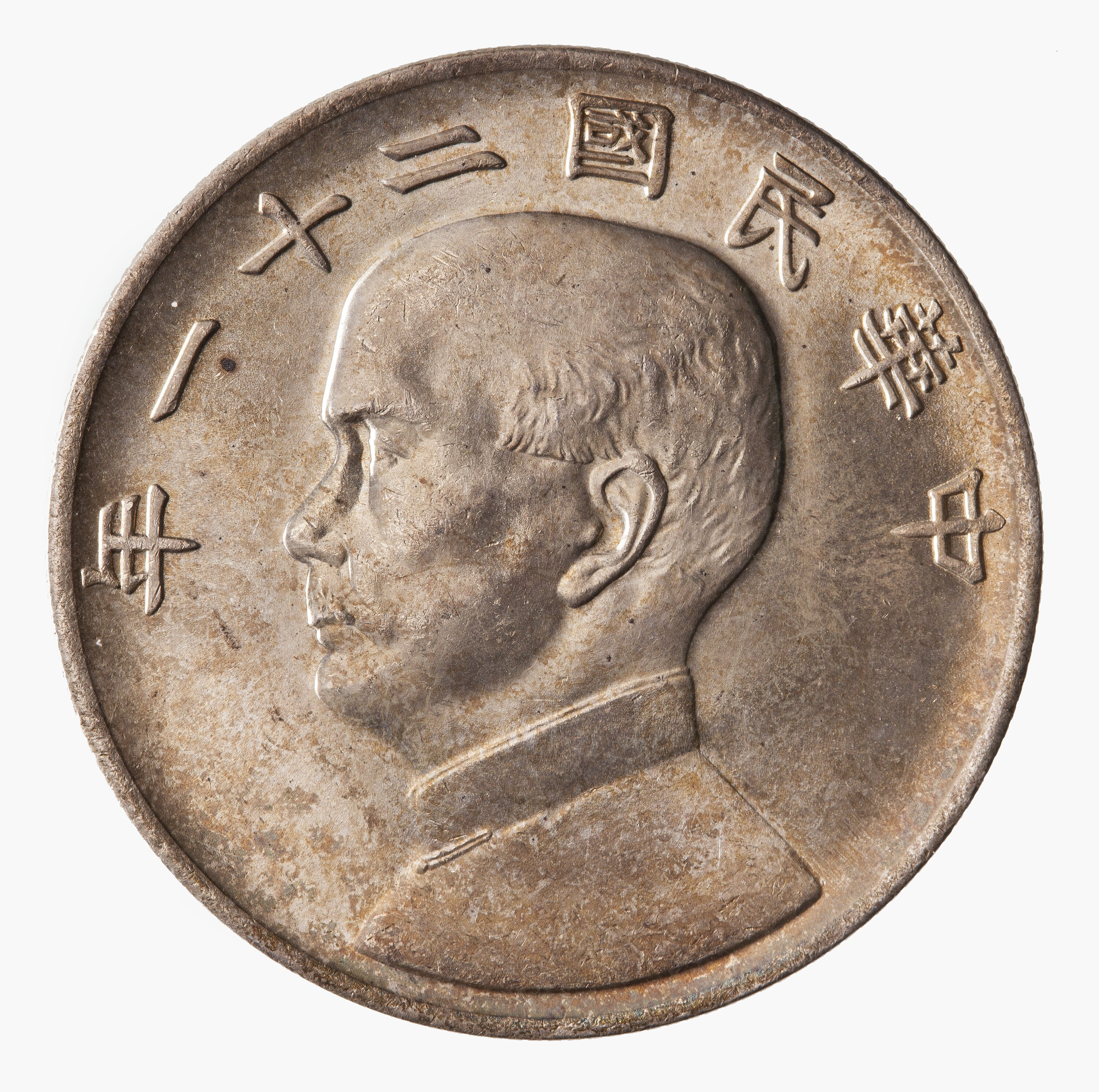
- Design: A profile portrait of Sun Yat-sen, with the date above

Reverse
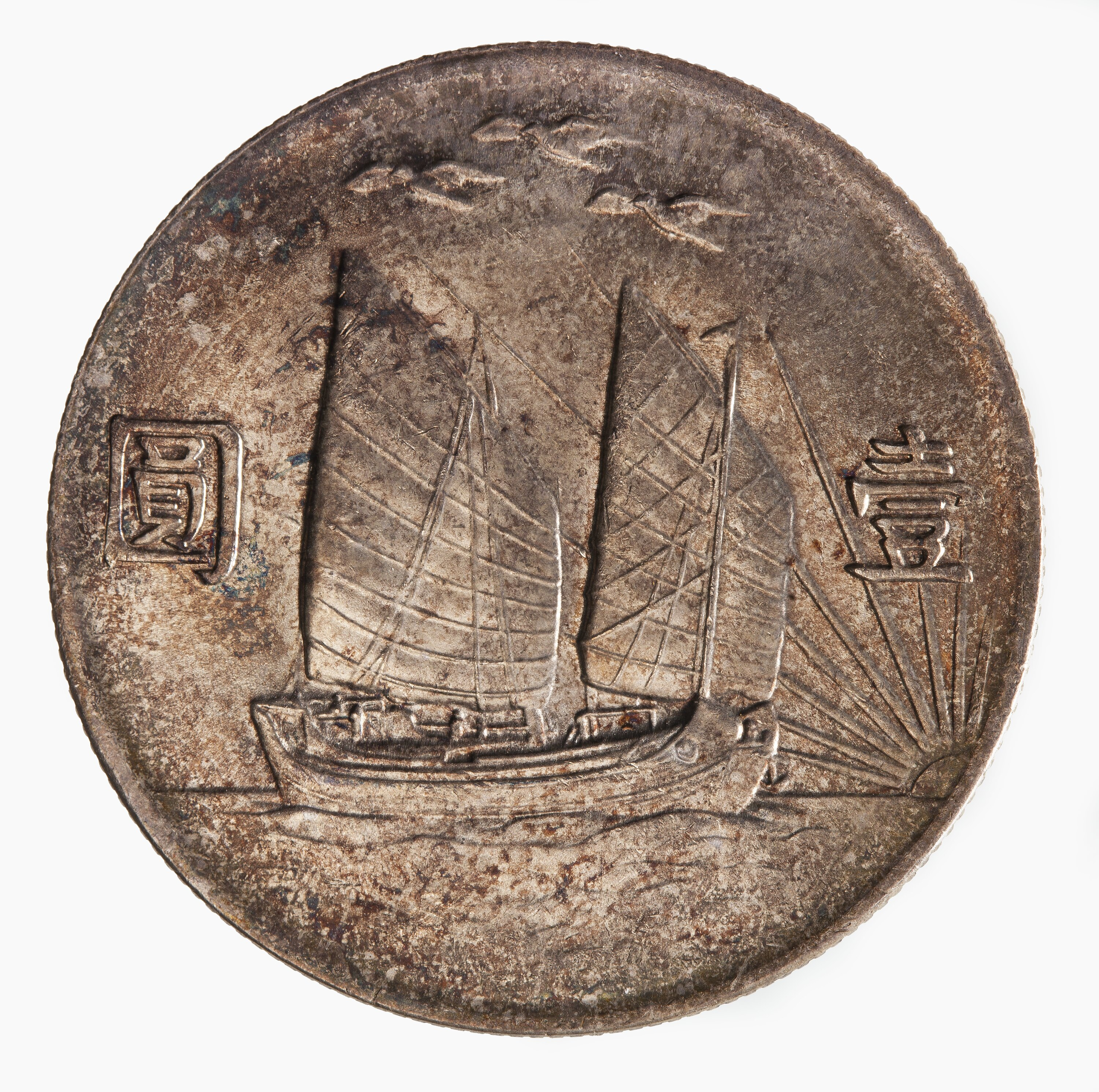
- Design: A junk on the waves, with a rising sun to the right and three wild geese above. The junk is flanked by the denomination 1 yuan (壹圓)

The junk dollar (Chinese: 船洋; pinyin: chuányáng; lit. 'ocean boat [dollar]') is a silver dollar (yuan) coin minted by the Republic of China between 1933 and 1935, with sporadic production in 1948–1949. During the Warlord Era of the 1920s, silver dollars depicting former president Yuan Shikai circulated widely until production was halted by the Kuomintang, who reunified much of the country in the late 1920s. They were initially replaced by restrikes of the memento dollar, a 1912 commemorative coin which featured a crude portrait of former president and Kuomintang leader Sun Yat-sen. The Kuomintang's Nationalist government sought to replace this with a new coin, but rejected various proposed designs, which were likely seen as poorly resembling Sun. The design eventually approved featured a profile bust of Sun on the obverse, with a two-mast junk (a traditional Chinese boat) on the reverse, alongside a flock of geese and a rising sun.

About 2,260,000 were produced at the newly-opened Shanghai Central Mint from March to June 1933, featuring the Chinese Republican date for the previous year, 21. However, the rising sun on the reverse prompted comparisons to the Rising Sun flag of the Empire of Japan, while the geese were thought to resemble warplanes. These were removed from the later issues of the coins, and most coins of the initial design were melted down. Production continued until December 1935, when China abruptly abandoned the silver standard. During the second phase of the Chinese Civil War in 1948, Nationalist-controlled territories entered hyperinflation, leading the Nationalists to mint new junk dollars domestically and import them from abroad. Production halted in October 1949 when Guangzhou was captured by Communist forces.

== Background ==
In response to the increasingly widespread circulation of foreign silver coins in imperial China during the 19th century, the domestic production of silver yuan coins, often referred to as dragon dollars, was authorized by Liangguang Viceroy Zhang Zhidong. The first machine-minted coins produced in China, they were first made in Guangdong in 1889. Over the following decades, officials argued between the silver and gold standards, and whether the currency should be based on the yuan or tael weights. The national government officially adopted the silver yuan as the base unit of currency in 1910, producing limited numbers of silver dollars the following year.

Following the 1911 Revolution and the collapse of the Qing dynasty, the yuan was reaffirmed as the base unit of currency by the Beiyang government in 1913. As the central mint in Tianjin had been rendered inoperable during the revolution, various provincial issues circulated, including restrikes of dragon dollars. Two commemorative coins featuring President Sun Yat-sen (the memento dollar) and Vice President Li Yuanhong respectively, were created in 1912. After President Yuan Shikai's rise to power, dollar coins featuring his portrait were produced. Although his regime was unpopular up to his death in 1916, his coins circulated widely and continued to be produced by various mints across the country over the following decade.

China entered the Warlord Era after Yuan's death, as political authority fell into the hands of regional warlords. Throughout the 1920s, the Kuomintang (KMT)—led by Sun Yat-sen, and after his death in 1925, Chiang Kai-shek—fought to reunify China from the KMT base in the south. Chiang's Northern Expedition took Nanjing in 1927. To replace the Yuan Shikai dollar, the Kuomintang government began producing restrikes of the 1912 memento dollar that year. In 1928, the Nationalists took over northern China and halted the production of Yuan Shikai dollars. However, the Yuan Shikai dollars continued to circulate across the country, and were occasionally restruck.

== Creation ==
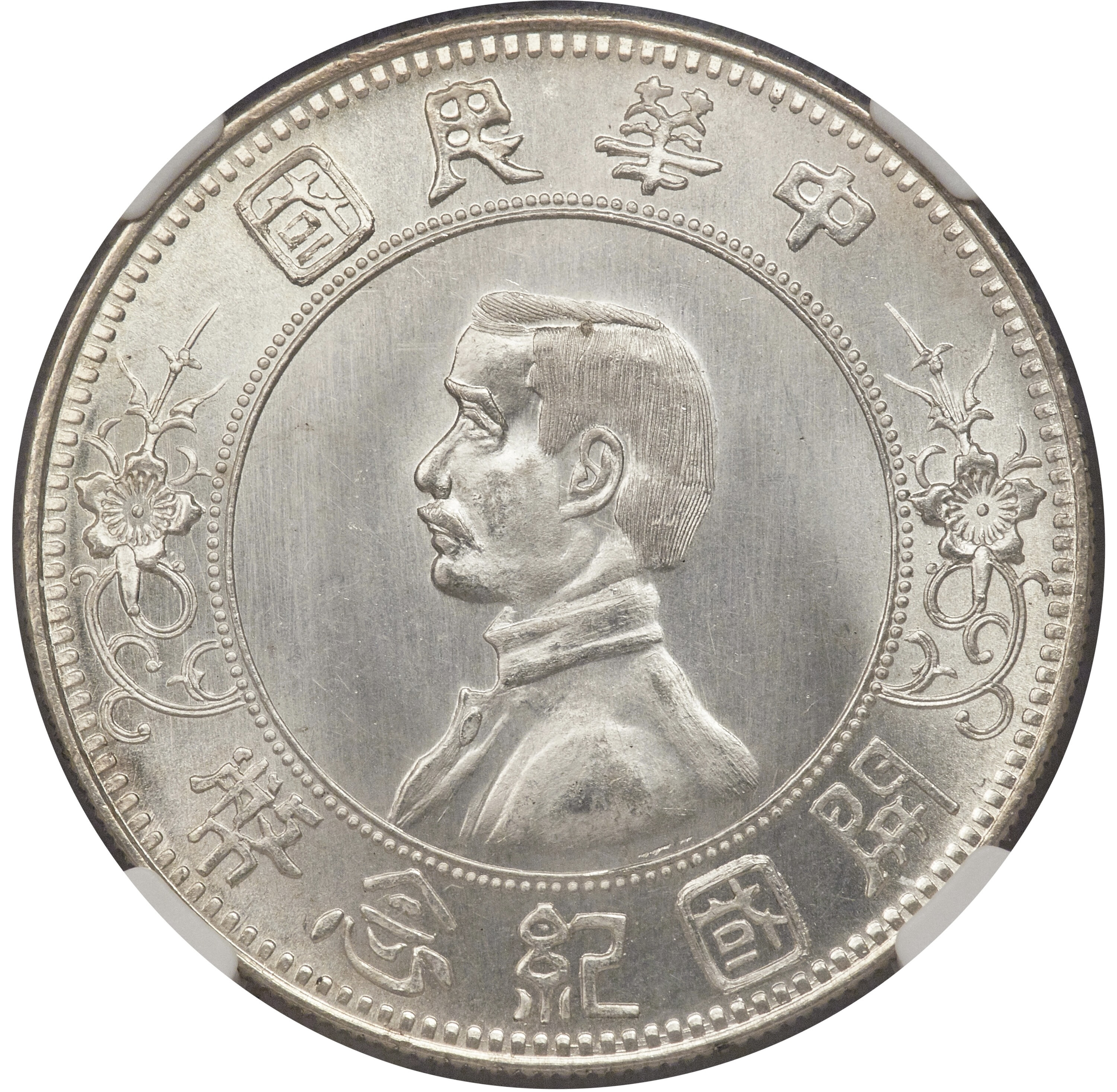
The memento dollar, a 1912 silver dollar featuring Sun Yat-sen

The memento dollar's design was seen as inadequate by the Nationalist government. Eduard Kann, a numismatist and advisor for the Chinese mint, later described it as rushed and low-quality, writing "artistically, the coin leaves much to be desired". A 1927 design presented to the Ministry of Finance featured a portrait of Sun on the obverse, with his Nanjing mausoleum and the setting sun on the reverse. Kann praised the design as exceptionally well-engraved, but bearing little resemblance to Sun; he recounted one Chinese mint official who described its likeness as closer to German president Paul von Hindenburg. The Nanjing Mint produced 480 assay coins before the design was rejected.

The Nationalist government pursued currency reform, passing an act in June 1928 to abolish the tael, which had continued to see use as a currency unit in the form of sycee, small ingots of precious metal. During the Great Depression, beginning in 1929, several economists and advisers proposed the adoption of a new currency based off the gold standard. These proposals were halted in 1931 by the Japanese invasion of Manchuria and the United Kingdom's abandonment of the gold standard.

The Nationalist government continued to pursue an alternate design for the Sun Yat-sen dollar. Patterns for a dollar and 20-cent piece were produced at the Tianjin Mint in 1929. These featured a forward-facing portrait of Sun on the obverse and a globe topped by the Kuomintang and Chinese flags. This design was rejected, likely for its poor depiction of Sun. In the same year, the mint produced an assay piece featuring the obverse of the previous design and the reverse used on the Yuan Shikai dollar.

Also in 1929, the Ministry of Finance ordered pattern pieces of the Sun Yat-sen dollar to be designed at five different nation's mints: Austria, Italy, Japan, the United Kingdom, and the United States. All five mints were given identical specifications, featuring Sun Yat-sen on the obverse and a sailing junk ship on the reverse. The Vienna Mint was additionally commissioned to produce 50, 20, and 10 cent pieces with the same design in correspondingly smaller sizes. None of these designs were used, likely again based off the accuracy of Sun's portrait. However, the reverse of the Italian design was reused for the eventual circulating issue. A trial piece likely designed at the Tianjin mint was struck in silver and copper patterns, features a half-profile bust of Sun facing towards the left, but no reverse. He is wearing a necktie and a coat with a high collar.

=== Design ===
The design finally adopted for the coin featured a profile portrait of Sun facing to the left, above which arcs the date of minting (using the Republic of China calendar). The reverse features a junk ship with two masts sailing to the right. The characters for "one yuan" (壹圓; yī yuán) flank the ship. The sun is rising on the horizon to the right, while three wild geese are shown flying overhead. A similar design was planned for a set of gold coins, but these never progressed beyond patterns. The dollar coins were 39.5 mm (1.56 in) in diameter, 2.5 mm (0.1 in) thick, and weighed 27 grams (0.95 oz). They were struck on 0.880 fineness silver, and featured milled edges.

The American economist Arthur N. Young praised the coin's design as attractive, while Kann described the depiction of Sun as a "fairly good likeness" and stated that the coins were popular with the public.

== Production history ==
Mintage numbers of junk dollars
Year marked	Date minted	Mintage
21 (1932)	March–June 1933	2,260,000
22 (1933)	June 1933 – May 1934	46,400,000
23 (1934)	May 1934 – December 1935	98,740,000
23 (1934)	1948 – October 1949	~32,000,000
Total	—N/a	~179,400,000

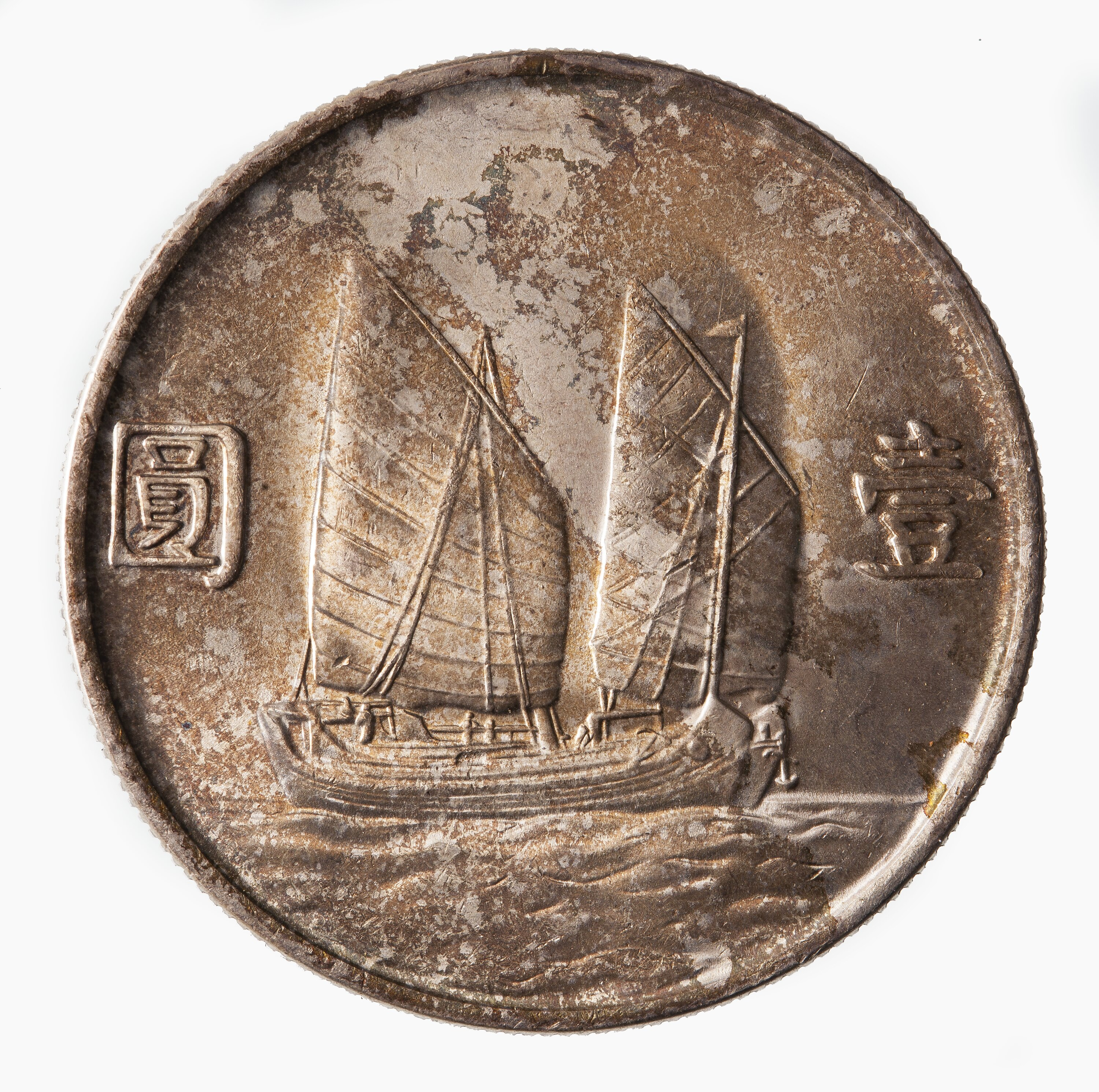
Reverse of the Year 23 Junk dollar, showing the altered design without the geese or rising sun

In 1932, the Nationalist government opened the Central Mint in Shanghai, first approved in 1921, and closed all other Chinese mints. The junk dollar entered production thereafter. Although marked as Year 21 in the Republican calendar (1932), the first issue was produced between March and June 1933. Although 2,600,000 were produced, only 55,000 coins entered circulation, with the rest melted down. This reverse of the coin was quickly compared to the Rising Sun flag used by the Empire of Japan, while the gulls were thought to resemble warplanes. These features were removed from the coin in June 1933, leaving only the ship on the waves and the coin's value. The obverse was unchanged, except for the change of the marked year to Year 22. Coins of the original design are known in Chinese as "three bird coins" (三鸟币; sānniǎobì), while the latter design, and the series more generally, are known as "ocean boat [dollars]" (船洋; chuányáng).

Another mintage of coins with the new design began in May 1934 and continued until December 1935. These coins used the Year 23 (1934) date and were struck using master dies produced by the United States' Philadelphia Mint. Kann recounts the Central Mint producing 210,000 coins per working day, describing their quality as excellent and free from errors. In November 1935, the Nationalist government passed a set of currency reforms, abruptly taking the currency off the silver standard and halting the production of silver coins, to be replaced by the use of paper money. A pattern for a half-dollar coin featuring the same design had been produced at the mint in 1935, but never entered circulation due to the reform.

After the abolition of the silver standard, the Nationalist government ordered three million silver tokens (i.e. carrying only the intrinsic silver value) from the United States, where it had held some silver in reserve. These were produced in both dollar and half-dollar sizes, with Sun Yat-sen's portrait on the obverse and a depiction of ancient spade money on the reverse. These pieces were produced and shipped to Hong Kong, but never entered circulation due to the outbreak of the Second Sino-Japanese War in 1937.

=== Later history ===
The Chinese Civil War reemerged after the surrender of Japan. Communist offensives from Manchuria slowly forced the Nationalists south, and by 1948 the economy of the Nationalist-controlled territories in the south and west entered hyperinflation, leading to the production of silver dollars in an attempt to stabilize the yuan. While the Central Mint had been dismantled prior to the Japanese invasion, the Nationalists were able to restart operations in 1948 and produce junk dollars. The Nationalists also ordered about 30,000,000 junk dollars from the American Philadelphia Mint, Denver Mint, and San Francisco Mint. These arrived in Hong Kong in June and July 1949 and were then shipped to Guangzhou.

Shanghai was taken by the Communists' People's Liberation Army in 1949, leading the government to restart operations at the Canton Mint in Guangzhou in August. Guangzhou produced a mixture of junk dollars, Yuan Shikai dollars, and memento dollars, evidenced by the existence of mules (coins with mismatched obverse and reverse designs). Kann estimated that no more than 2,000,000 junk dollars were minted at Canton. The Nationalist government approached the British Royal Mint to commission the production of additional junk and Yuan Shikai dollars, but no trial pieces were ever produced. Mints in Taipei and possibly Chengdu also produced unknown amounts of Year 23 junk dollars in the latter half of 1949. Guangzhou was taken by Communist forces in October 1949, ending production.

Counterfeiting of the junk dollar was not a major concern during its period of circulation, as the quality of the Shanghai Mint's modern machinery was difficult to reproduce. However, as the coin has become popular with collectors, modern counterfeits are common. The Year 23 and Year 21 junk dollars are among the most commonly counterfeited of all Chinese coins.
