= Auto Dollar =

1928 Chinese commemorative coin

- Guizhou clique
- Value: One yuan (壹圆/壹圓)
- Mass: 25.80 g
- Diameter: 39 mm
- Shape: Round
- Composition: Silver
- Years of minting: ROC 17 (1928)
- Mintage: 648,000

Obverse
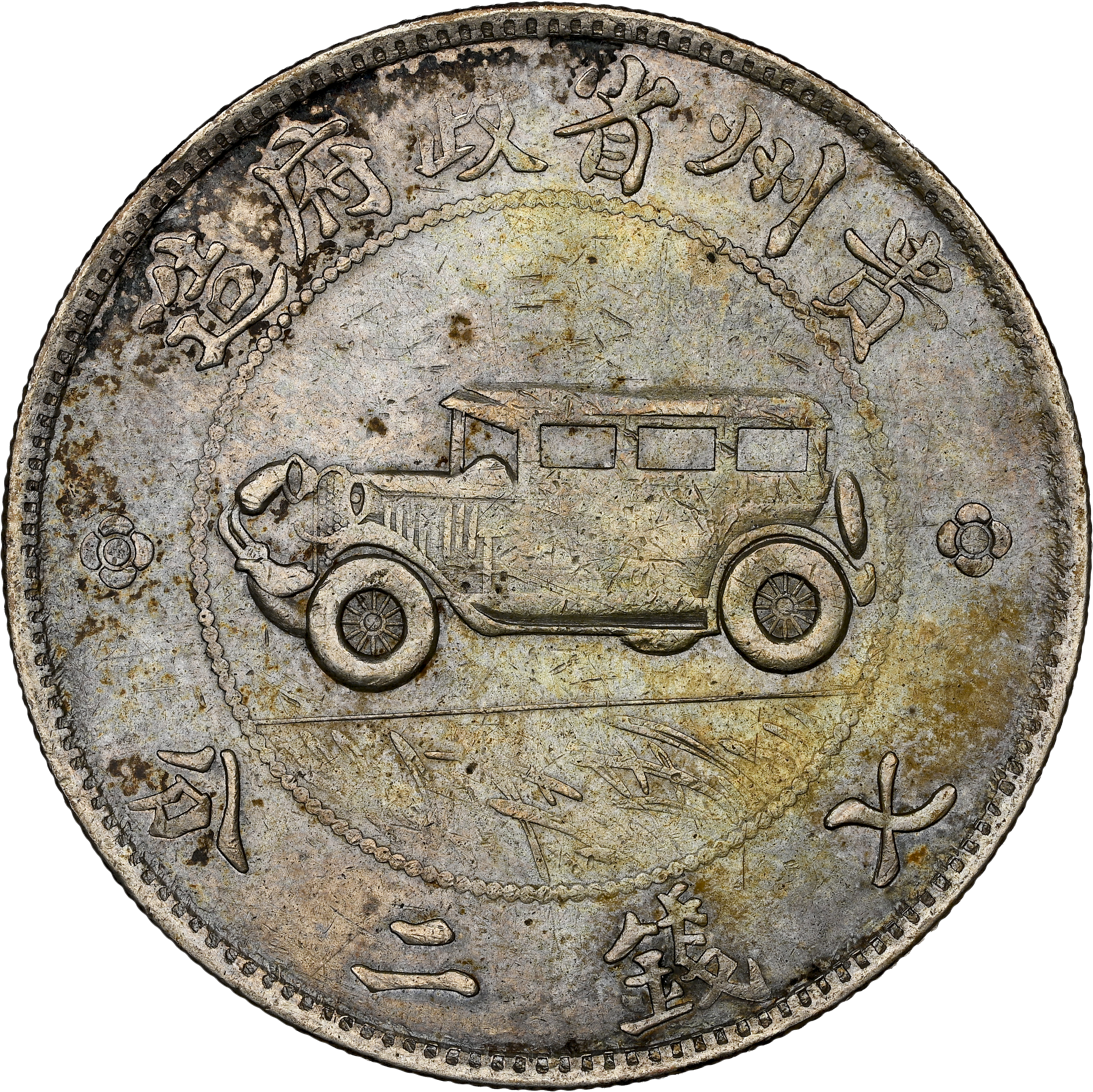
- Design: Zhou Xicheng's car driving on a road, with grass along the front arranged to spell his personal name

Reverse
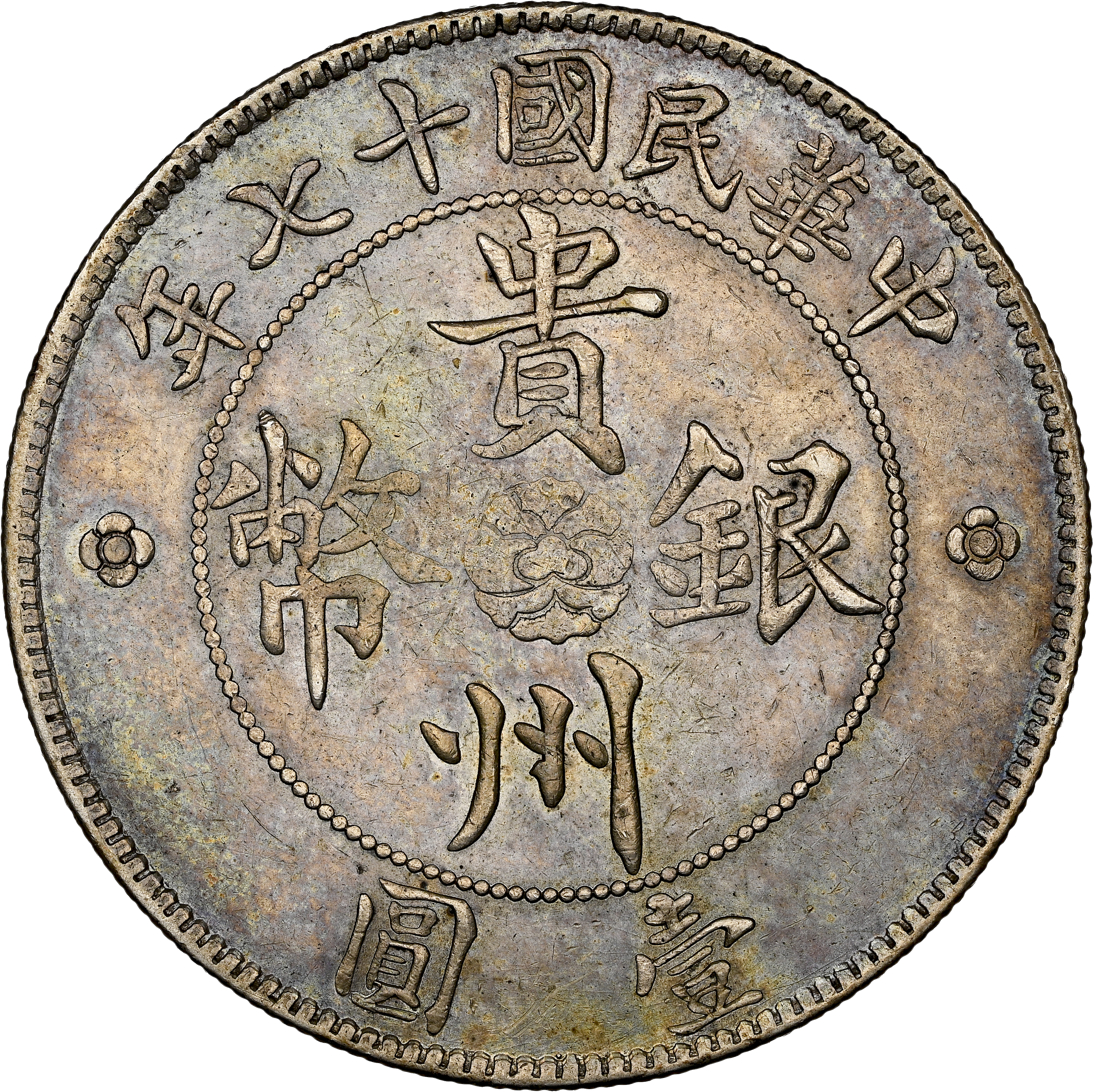
- Design: Chinese text surrounding a central flower motif

Auto Dollar
- Traditional Chinese: 貴州汽車幣
- Simplified Chinese: 贵州汽车币
- Literal meaning: Guizhou automobile coin
Transcriptions
Standard Mandarin
- Hanyu Pinyin: Guìzhōu qìchē bì
- Wade–Giles: Kuei^{4}-chou^{1} Chʻi^{4}-chʻe^{1} Pi^{4}
Yue: Cantonese
- Yale Romanization: gwai jāu hei chē baih

Alternative Chinese name
- Traditional Chinese: 汽車錢
- Simplified Chinese: 汽车钱
- Literal meaning: Automobile money
Transcriptions
Standard Mandarin
- Hanyu Pinyin: Qìchē qián
- Wade–Giles: Chʻi^{4}-chʻe^{1} Chʻien^{2}
Yue: Cantonese
- Yale Romanization: hei chē chín

The Auto Dollar (Chinese: 汽車錢; lit. 'Automobile coin', also known as 贵州汽车币; 'Guizhou car coin' or Kweichow Auto Dollar in English) is a silver one yuan coin minted by Chinese warlord Zhou Xicheng in 1928 to commemorate the construction of roadways in Guizhou province. The obverse of the coin features an automobile driving along a road, flanked by grass arranged to spell out Zhou's personal name, Xicheng (西成).

Zhou rose to power in Guizhou in 1927, during the political and military upheaval of the Warlord Era. He had acquired the rural province's first known automobile, oversaw the construction of roadways across the region, and saw the foundation of a mint and arsenal in Guiyang. Unlike other Chinese warlords, he never commissioned coinage featuring his image. Although some sources described Zhou's automobile as a soft-topped model from the Hudson Motor Car Company, the vehicle featured on the coin does not appear to closely correspond to any specific make or model. 648,000 coins of the type were produced at the Guiyang mint. The coin fell out of regular circulation in the early 1930s, partially due to demand from international coin collectors. The Auto Dollar is a rare and heavily counterfeited type; a certified example graded in mint condition sold for US$336,000 at a 2023 auction.

== Background ==
Prior to the late 19th century, silver coinage in China was largely limited to imported foreign coins, used alongside copper cash coins and the sycee silver ingot currency. Large-scale domestic production of silver coins began around 1890 in Guangdong in order to compete with foreign silver. By 1910, provincial silver mints had emerged in around half of the Chinese provinces. The introduction of centrally produced silver coinage by the Qing government was delayed due to the uncertain primacy of the tael or dollar (圓; yuán) as a base monetary standard. The central mint at Tianjin only produced limited quantities of 'Dragon Dollars' before the 1911 Revolution, and was destroyed the following year. Central coinage entered production again in 1915, but was stifled by the emergence of the Warlord Period. A unified national coinage system would not be achieved until 1932–1933, with the Nationalist government opening the Shanghai Central Mint.

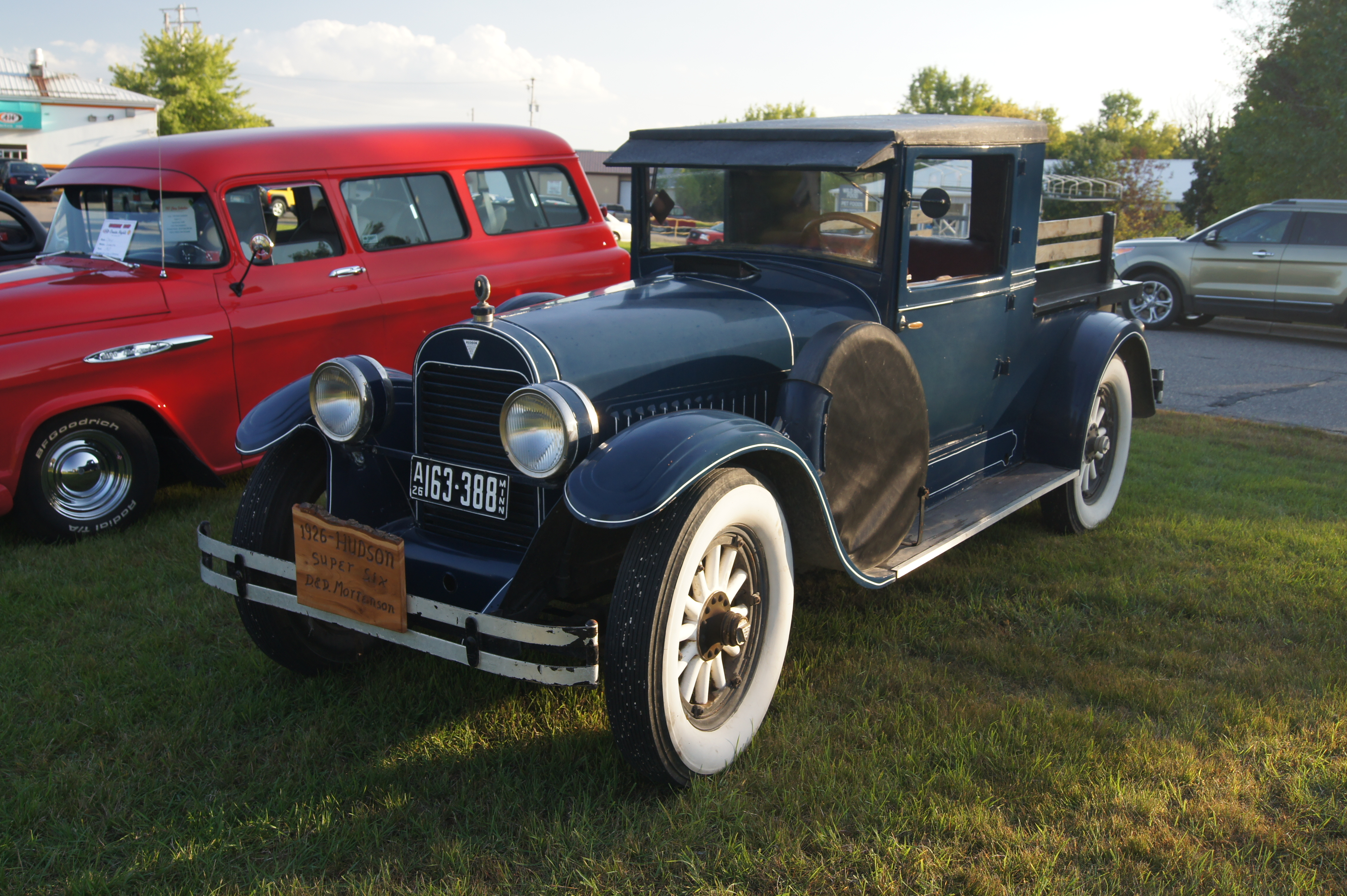
A 1926 Hudson Super Six. Some sources describe Zhou Xicheng's vehicle as a Hudson model.

Displacing the dragon dollar designs were coins featuring the busts of influential political and military leaders. Coins featuring depictions of Sun Yat-sen (such as the Memento dollar) and Yuan Shikai (the Yuan Shikai dollar) were common in the early years of the Republic. Other figures were featured on various copper, silver, and gold coins, often intended as commemorative pieces rather than circulating currency. Regional warlords such as Tang Jiyao, Lu Rongting, Duan Qirui, Cao Kun, and Zhang Zuolin commissioned coinage featuring themselves to commemorate their achievements and boost their political prestige during the political and military turmoil of the late 1910s and 1920s.

Yuan Zuming served as the military governor of Guizhou province until his death at the hands of Nationalist forces in 1927 for an alleged lack of loyalty. Following this, his nominal lieutenant Zhou Xicheng assumed full control of the province. Zhou, already a prominent civil governor and warlord, aligned closely with the Nationalist government and invested heavily in Guizhou's civil infrastructure. He imported the province's first known automobile around 1926, described in the memoirs of engineering advisor Oliver Julian Todd as a "seven-seater American automobile". Some sources describe this car as a "soft-top" model produced by the Hudson Motor Car Company. In addition to large scale road construction across the province, Zhou sponsored various infrastructure and construction projects in Guiyang. Among these included the construction of an arsenal and a small mint in the city.

== Design and history ==
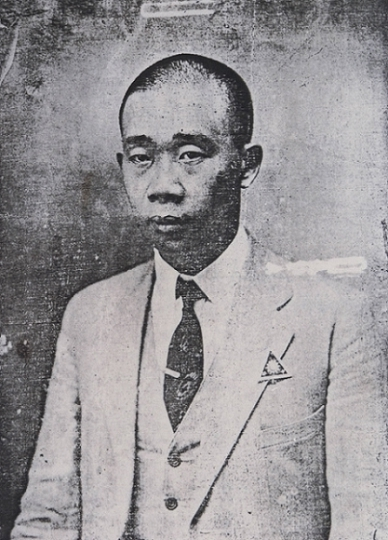
Zhou Xicheng, c. 1920s

No mints existed in Guizhou during the early 1920s, and it relied on coinage produced in other provinces. Before the Guiyang mint opened, a provisional mint was established in southern Guizhou in 1926 using machinery and coin dies taken from the Chengdu mint in the adjacent province of Sichuan. In large part due to the machinery and technicians provided by the local arsenal, the mint in Guiyang was able to produce coinage by 1928. Unlike many other regional warlords in China, Zhou never commissioned coinage featuring his image. This may have been due to a desire to avoid association with other warlords and emphasize his loyalty to the Nationalist government.

Although serving to recognize Zhou's reputation for road construction more generally, the Auto Dollar is thought to memorialize the 1928 completion of a provincial highway in Guizhou. The Guiyang mint produced the coin only for that year. The obverse features an automobile driving along a road, with grass in the foreground arranged to spell out Xicheng (西成), his personal name, when the coin is tilted 90 degrees. Although it was intended as a representation of Zhou's car, the vehicle featured on the coin does not perfectly match its description; it is depicted with a hard-topped roof and a design that does not match any specific make or model. The car and grass design is encircled by a pearled ring. Surrounding this is text naming the Guizhou government as the issuer, as well as the coin's silver weight—seven mace and two candareens.

The reverse features Chinese text surrounding a central rosette seal associated with Sichuan's republic coinage. Surrounding the central seal are four characters reading "Guizhou Silver Coin" (貴州銀幣; Guìzhōu yínbì). A knotted circle surrounds the central characters, above which is given the Chinese Republican calendar date, 17 (1928 AD). At the bottom, the denomination (壹圓; yī yuán; 'one yuan') is given. Two small rosettes are found along the sides of both the obverse and reverse. Struck in silver, the coin has a weight of 25.8 g (0.9 oz) and a diameter of 39 mm (1.5 in). A total of 648,000 coins were issued.

Some varieties exist of the coin, differing through minor distinctions in the rendering of the car, grass, and text. The lines along the car's hood are usually curving towards the top, but remaining straight in some varieties. Two blades of grass are visible along the curb in the bottom-right corner in most varieties, but three are visible in one variety. Another variety depicts additional spokes on the car's wheels.

== Legacy and collecting ==
The coin became popular with coin collectors soon after its release. By the early 1930s, the coin had become increasingly scarce in circulation due to demand from international collectors. One of the coins, graded AU 53 by the Numismatic Guaranty Company, auctioned for US$192,000 in January 2022. In June 2023, this record was broken by an MS 62-graded example (the second-highest grade of any known Auto Dollar), which auctioned for US$336,000 at the Hong Kong International Numismatic Fair.

Due to the coin's rarity, they are commonly counterfeited. Counterfeit examples are typically of higher quality and consistency, due to the endemic die flaws and poor metal quality within the original issue.
