= Memento dollar =

Chinese silver dollar

- Value: One yuan (壹圓)
- Mass: 26.9 g
- Diameter: 36.9 mm (1.5 in)
- Thickness: 2.5 mm (0.098 in) mm
- Edge: reeded
- Composition: Silver (.900 fineness)
- Years of minting: 1912, 1927, 1949

Obverse
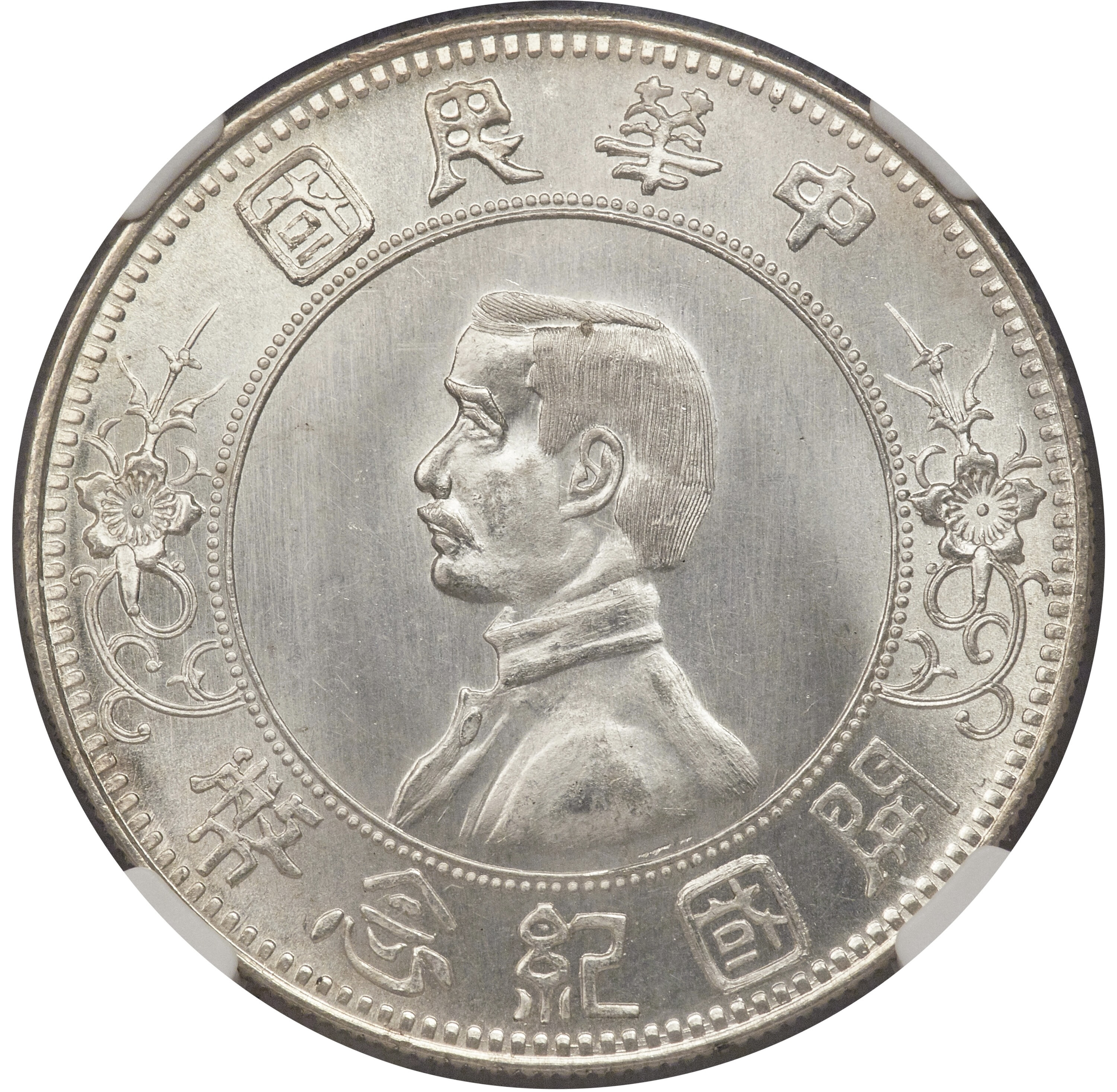
- Design: A portrait of Sun Yat-sen with peach blossoms
- Designer: He Ziliang
- Design date: 1912

Reverse
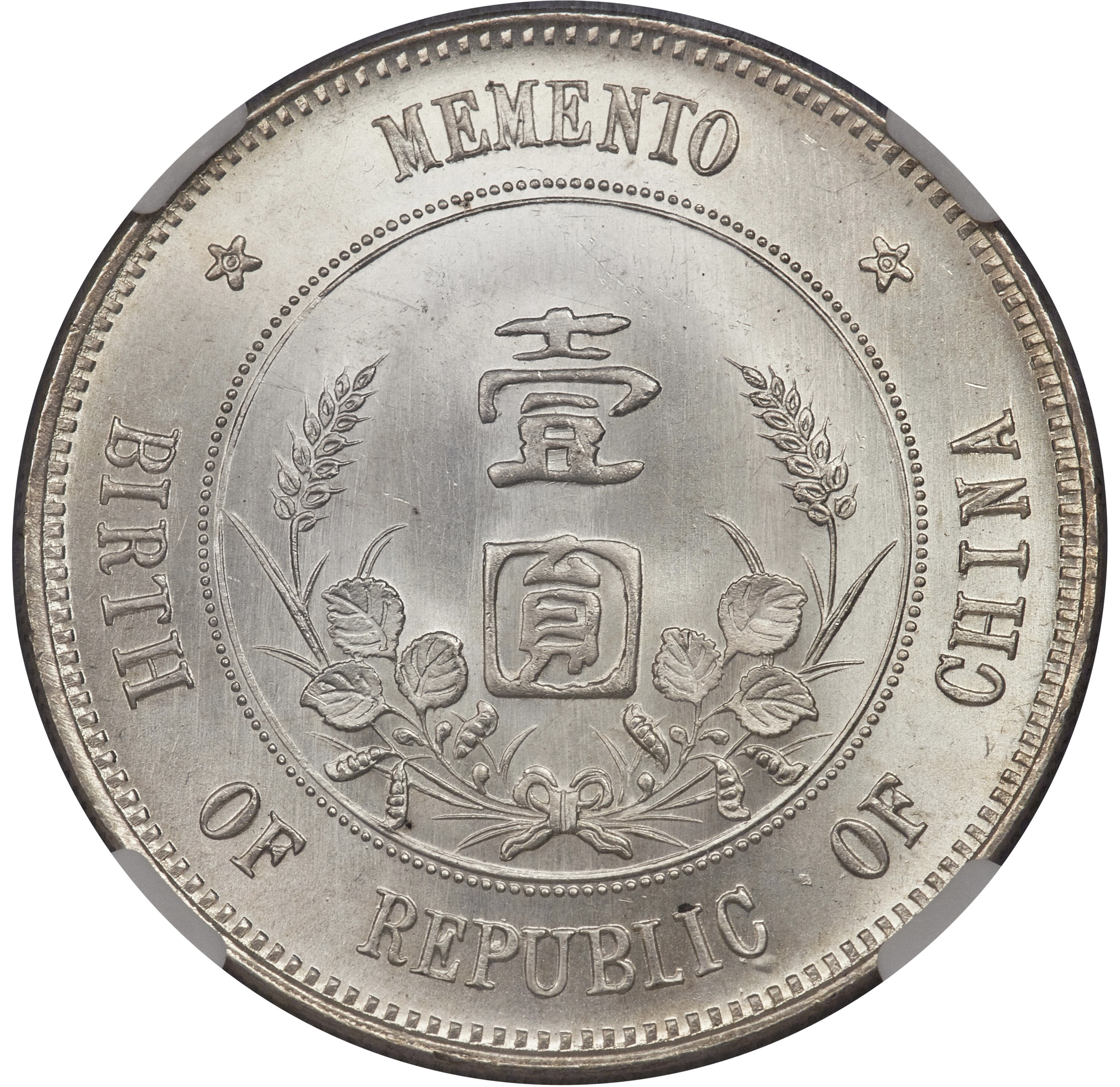
- Design: Inscription commemorating the founding of the Republic of China
- Designer: He Ziliang
- Design date: 1912

The memento dollar is a silver dollar minted in the Republic of China. Designed by Nanjing Mint engraver He Ziliang, it was introduced as a commemorative piece celebrating the inauguration of Sun Yat-sen as the first President of the Republic of China in 1912. Its production was revived by the Nationalist government in 1927 as a temporary replacement for the Yuan Shikai dollar; following delays in securing a suitable replacement, it was succeeded by the junk dollar following the opening of the Shanghai Central Mint in 1932. Following hyperinflation during the last stages of the Chinese Civil War, small numbers of the pieces were produced at the Canton Mint for several months in 1949.

The coins were struck in .900 fineness silver with a diameter of 36.9 mm (1.45 in) and a weight of 26.9 g (0.95 oz). It features a portrait of Sun Yat-sen on the obverse, surrounded by peach blossoms; this portrait was described as poorly rendered by numismatist Eduard Kann due to rushed production. On the reverse, a wreath of rice and beans encircles the denomination of 壹圓; 'one yuan'. Smaller twenty and ten-cent denominations of the coin were also produced, of which only the twenty-cent circulated.

== Background ==
In response to the widespread circulation of foreign silver coins in China throughout the 19th century, the domestic production of silver dollars or yuan (dubbed Dragon dollars for their design) was authorized by Liangguang Viceroy Zhang Zhidong, with the first entering production in Guangdong in 1889. These were the first machine-produced silver coins minted on a mass scale in China. After decades of debate between the silver and gold standards, as well as competition between the yuan and tael weights, the government adopted the silver yuan as the base unit of currency in 1910. The central mint in Tianjin had been rendered inoperable during the 1911 Revolution, with the Republic's early currency limited to already existing stockpiles of dragon dollars and various provincial issues.

== Design and production ==
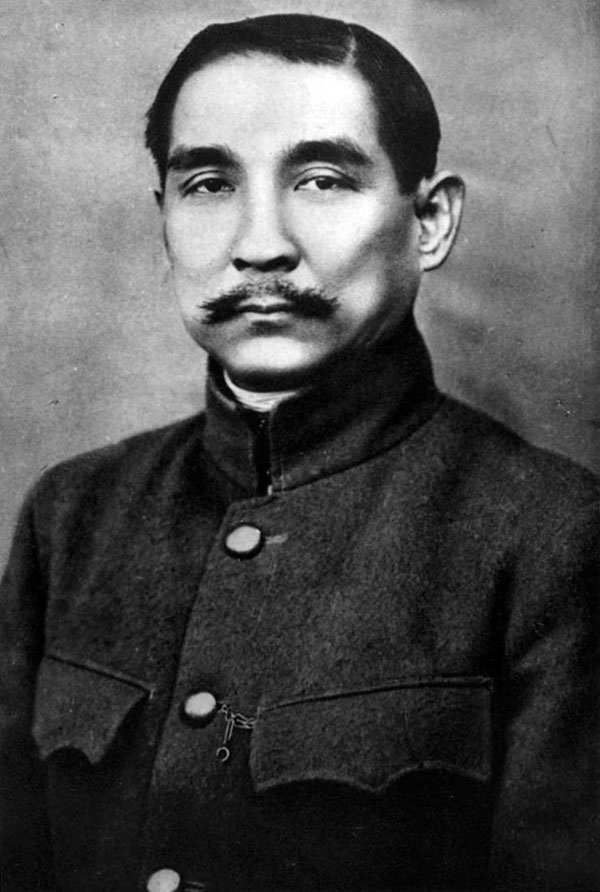
Sun Yat-sen in 1912

Sun Yat-sen's assumption to the Chinese presidency in early 1912 was honored by the Republican government with its first silver dollars, engraved by He Ziliang (何子樑) at the Nanjing Mint. The coins were struck in .900 fineness silver with milled edges, a thickness of 2.5 mm (0.098 in), a diameter of 36.9 mm (1.45 in), and a gross weight of 26.9 g (0.95 oz). These coins were soon followed with another commemorative silver dollar series featuring Vice President Li Yuanhong struck at Wuchang mint.

The obverse of the coins feature a portrait of Sun Yat-sen within a pearled ring, flanked on either side by peach blossoms. The label 中華民國; 'Republic of China' arcs above the ring, while the text 開國紀念幣; 'Coin to commemorate the founding of the republic' lies beneath. On the reverse, the label 壹圓; 'one yuan' is surrounded by a wreath of rice and beans and a pearled ring. This is surrounded by English text reading "Memento" and "Birth of Republic of China". The coins bear no date. Sun Yat-sen's portrait is rendered crudely, likely due to the inexperienced and rapid engraving of the steel dies in order for the coin to quickly enter production. Numismatist Eduard Kann noted the rushed and low-quality design, writing that "artistically, the coin leaves much to be desired."

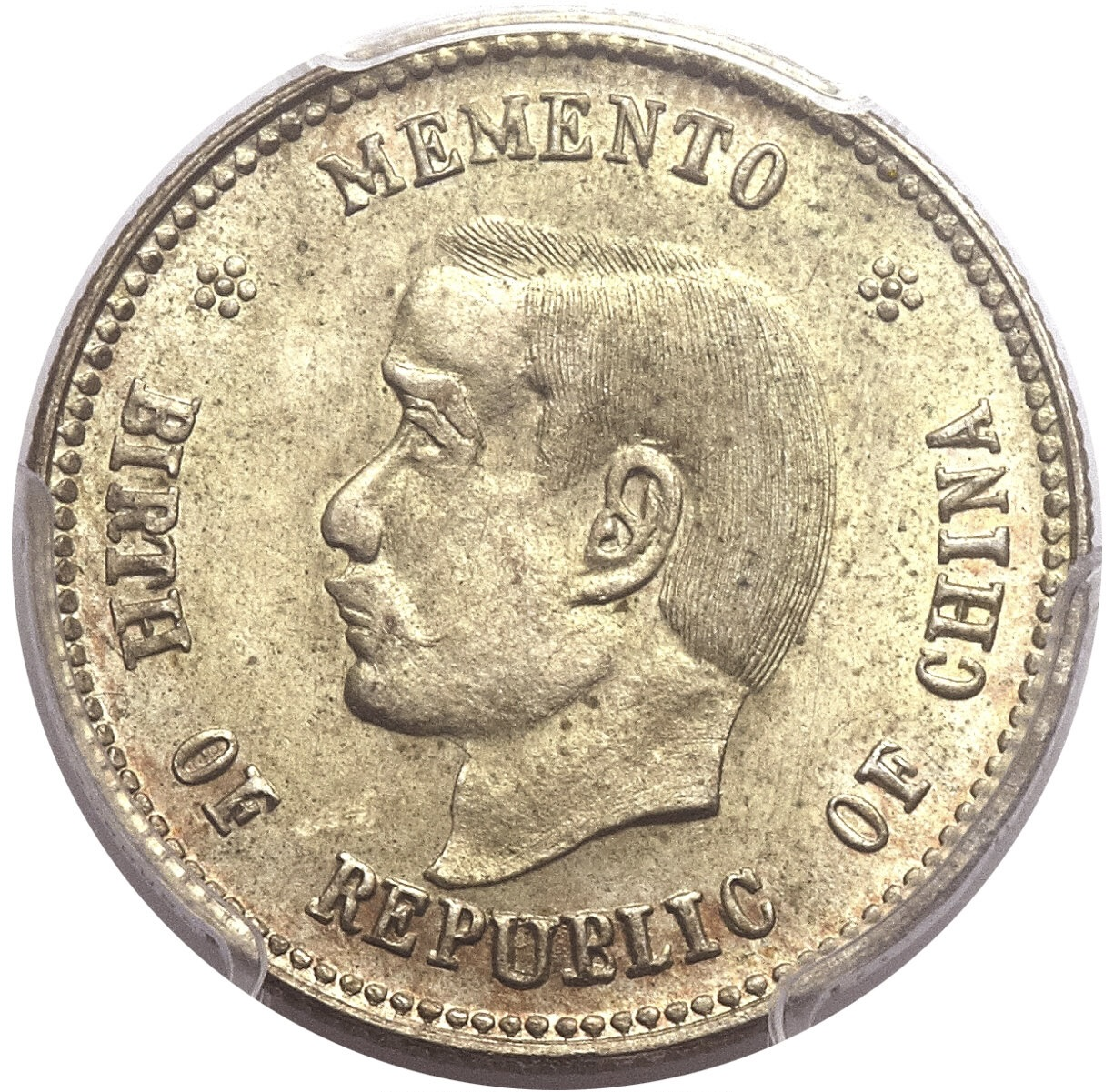
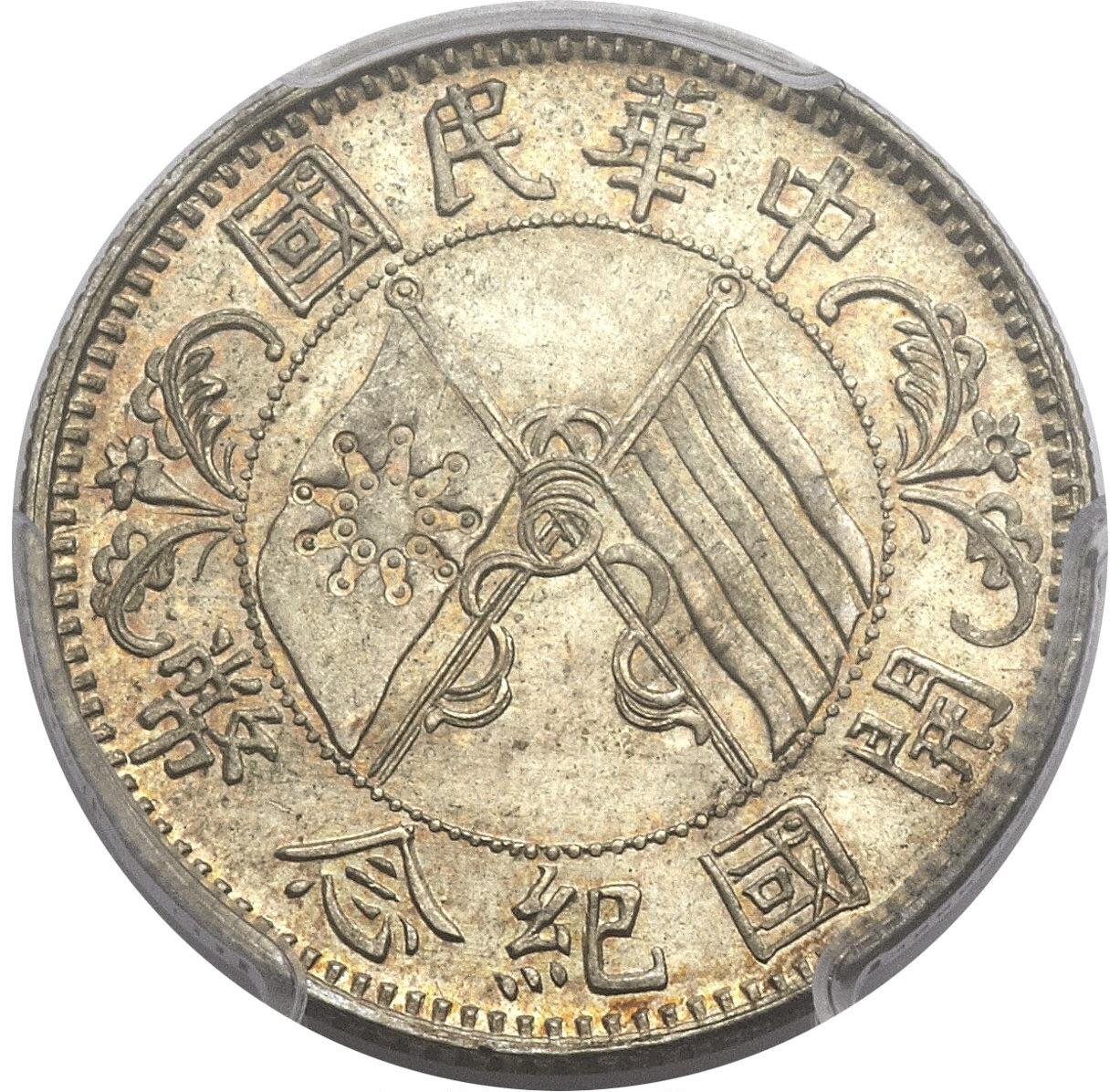
The Memento 20 cent piece produced in 1912, featuring an alternate portrait and crossed revolutionary flags

Similar coins were produced with a similar design with twenty and ten-cent denominations. The twenty-cent version displays the English text on the obverse around a portrait of Sun (larger relative to the coin than the dollar), with a distinct reverse featuring a crossed Five Colored Flag and flag of the Wuchang Uprising. The reverse does not feature a denomination; however, its weight of 5.2 g (0.18 oz) and diameter of 5.2 mm (0.20 in) is typical for a twenty-cent piece, and the coin circulated as such. The ten-cent piece features a portrait of Sun identical to the dollar coin, although features the denomination 枚十當圓; 'Ten pieces in one yuan' on the reverse.

Intended as keepsakes, neither the Sun Yat-sen or Li Yuanhong dollar pieces saw active circulation; this role was instead filled by provincially-issued silver coinage or restrikes of the dragon dollar. A general-issue dollar coin featuring the succeeding president Yuan Shikai began production at Tianjin in late 1914 and became the primary silver dollar of the early republic.

=== Later production ===
In 1926, Kuomintang leader Chiang Kai-shek launched the Northern Expedition. Following the capture of Nanjing in April 1927, the Nationalist government halted the production of the Yuan Shikai dollars. Lacking an established design, it began production of a silver dollar using the 1912 memento design; these were struck at Nanjing, Wuchang, and Hangzhou. Their design varies slightly from the 1912 rendering, with a narrower head and smaller mustache on the portrait of Sun. Whereas the word "Memento" on the reverse was flanked by five-pointed stars on the 1912 coin, these were replaced by elongated rosettes on the 1927 issue.

The military government of Sichuan province produced memento dollars locally from 1927 to 1930. These were based on the Nationalist government's coinage, although vary slightly in quality. Some varieties of these coins feature errors in the English typography, such as the misspelling of "REPUBLIC" as "REPUBIIC" or an upside-down T in "BIRTH". The Manchurian provinces, the last to produce the Yuan Shikai dollar, ceased production in 1929, and the Memento dollar was briefly the sole legally-produced silver dollar in China; however, provincially-issued Yuan Shikai dollars continued to circulate alongside the new national currency.

Seeing the memento design as inadequate, the Ministry of Finance commissioned a new silver dollar coin in 1927 from the Austrian Mint in Vienna. The mint produced 480 trial pieces of this "mausoleum dollar", which was rejected due to a portrait bearing little resemblance to Sun Yat-sen. Following various other foreign and domestic trial strikes, a 1929 design dubbed the "junk dollar" was mass-produced at the newly-opened Shanghai Central Mint beginning in 1932, ending the production of the memento dollar.

The Nationalist government abruptly abandoned the silver standard and silver coinage production in 1935, with large amounts of paper currency circulating in its place. Following large-scale inflation during the Second Sino-Japanese War and the reemergence of the Chinese Civil War, the yuan entered hyperinflation in 1948–1949. This forced mints in the nationalist-aligned southern and western provinces to return to the production of silver coinage. The Canton Mint produced an eclectic mix of memento, junk, and Yuan Shikai dollar restrikes for several months in 1949; this concurrent production led to mules of all three coins during this period.
