= Silver Dragon =

Silver Dragon or Silver dragon may refer to:

- Silver Dragon (coin), an East Asian silver coin
- Silver dragon, a subclass of metallic dragon in Dungeons & Dragons
- Tidal bores on the Qiantang River
