= Chinese dollar =

The Chinese dollar may refer to various historical currencies:

- Dai Fook dollar (台伏票, taifupiao) of the Qing Empire
- Yuan Shikai dollar (大洋银, dayangyin) of the Republic of China and the Chinese Empire
- Fengtian dollar (奉票, fengpiao) of Warlord China
- Harbin dollar (大洋票, dayangpiao) of Warlord China
- Old Taiwan dollar
- New Taiwan dollar

== See also ==
- Spanish silver dollar, used widely as currency in imperial China
- Chinese Yuán or RMB, sometimes informally referred to as "Chinese dollars"
- Hong Kong dollar
- History of Chinese currency
