= Yuan Shikai coinage =

Chinese coins

Yuan Shikai dollar
- Value: One yuan (壹圓)
- Mass: 0.72 Kuping tael, or 26.857 g
- Diameter: 39 mm (1.5 in)
- Thickness: 2.66 mm (0.105 in)
- Edge: reeded
- Composition: silver (generally .89 fineness)
- Silver: about 0.768 troy oz
- Years of minting: 1914–1928, with sporadic regional production until 1954
- Mintage: about 1.1 billion

Obverse
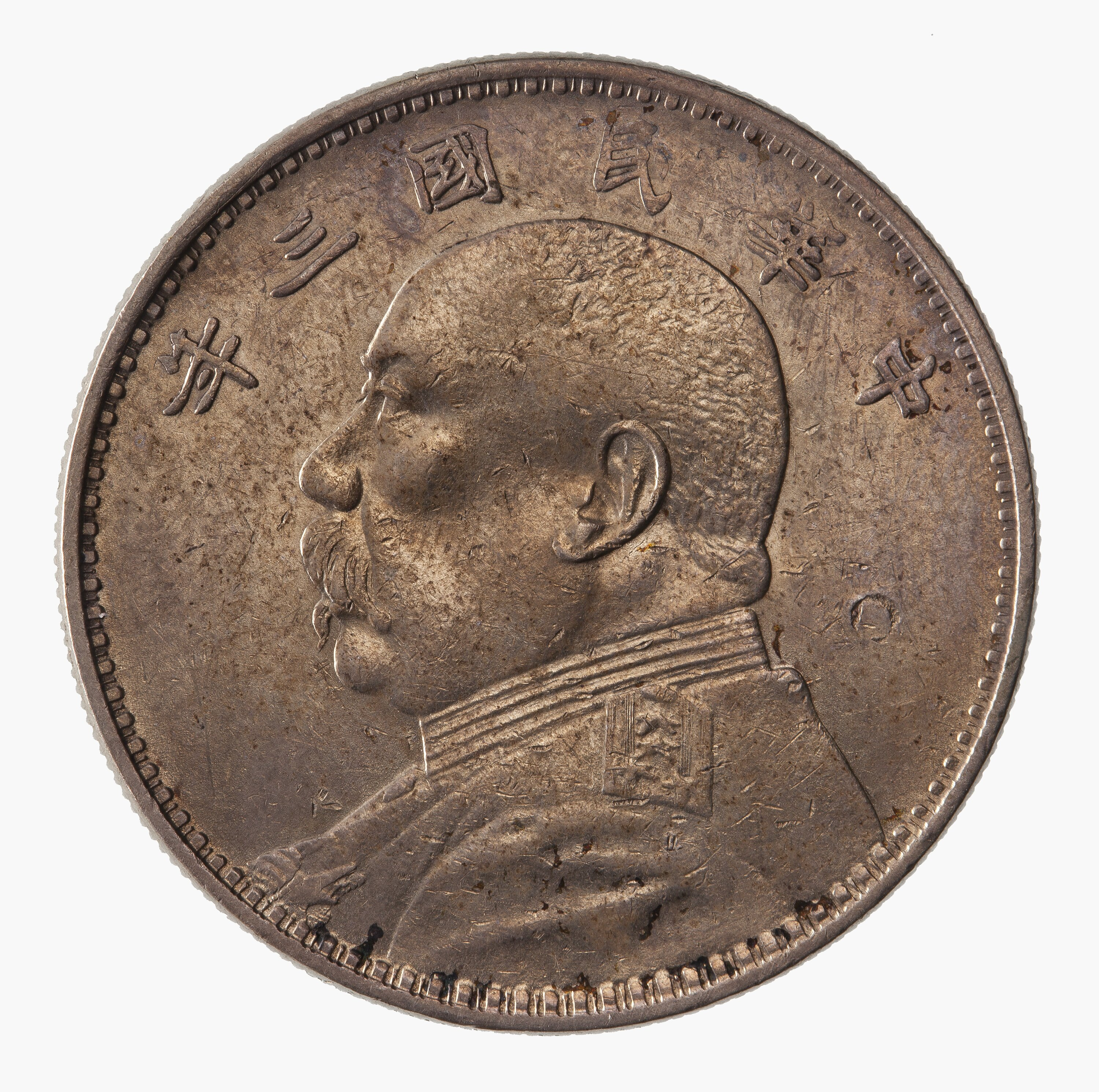
- Design: A profile portrait of Yuan Shikai in a military uniform, facing left
- Designer: Luigi Giorgi
- Design date: 1914

Reverse
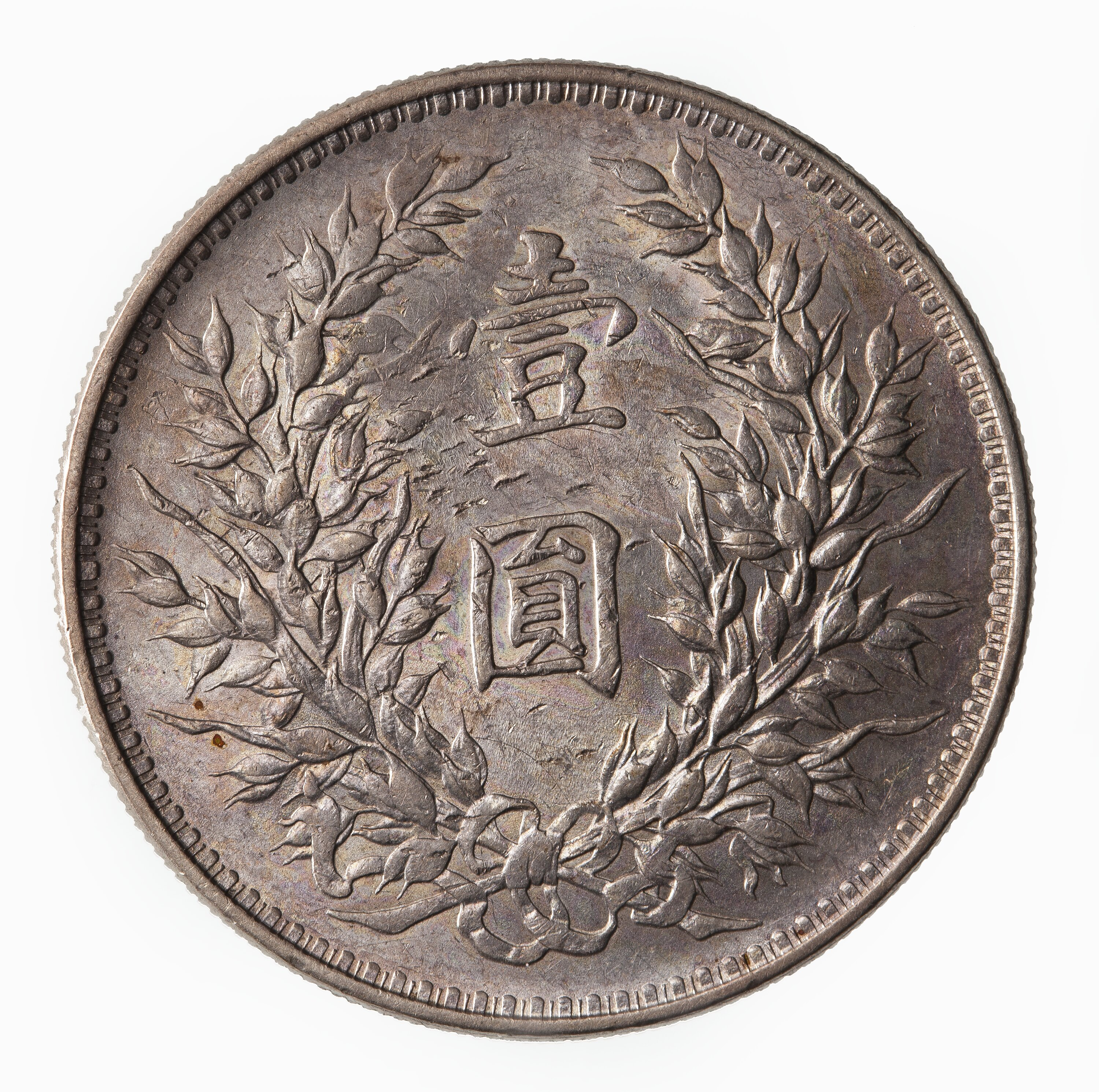
- Design: The denomination 1 yuan (壹圓) surrounded by a wreath of grain
- Designer: Luigi Giorgi
- Design date: 1914

The Yuan Shikai dollar (also known as the "fatman dollar" by collectors, from Chinese 袁大头; yuán dàtóu; 'big head Yuan Shikai [dollars]'), are silver coins featuring a portrait of the Chinese president and military leader Yuan Shikai, minted across the Republic of China to replace the previous imperial coinage and various foreign silver coins in circulation in China. Beginning in 1914, the coins remained in production till 1928, long after Yuan's death in 1916. Designed by Tianjin Mint engraver Luigi Giorgi, the coin features a profile bust of Yuan wearing a military uniform on the obverse, with a wreath of grain and the denomination of one yuan on the reverse.

The dollar coins were regularly produced by various mints across China from 1914 to 1928, with a total production run exceeding a billion coins. Until 1920, all coins were dated Republican Year 3 (1914 CE) regardless of their actual year of production. Some mints produced coins featuring various new dates during the 1920s, but these only incidentally coincided with their production date, with certain dates being usable as mint marks.

After the 1926–1928 Northern Expedition, the incipient Nationalist government halted production of the coins in favor of the memento dollar. However, regional circulation and production of the coins continued, with poorer-quality examples produced in Gansu and Communist-held areas during the 1930s. Production was curtailed by the abandonment of the silver standard in 1935, but returned in response to hyperinflation during the Chinese Civil War, including a large run of coins at Canton in 1949. The People's Republic once again produced the coin in the mid-1950s for circulation in newly annexed Tibet and rural regions of southwestern China. In total, around 1.1 billion Yuan Shikai dollars were produced between 1914 and 1954, not including local issues produced by warlords or revolutionaries.

== Background and creation ==
In response to the increasingly widespread circulation of foreign silver coins in imperial China during the 19th century, the domestic production of silver yuan coins, often referred to as dragon dollars, was authorized by Liangguang Viceroy Zhang Zhidong. They began to be made in Guangdong in 1889. These were the first machine-made silver coins minted on a mass scale in China, but failed to out-compete foreign silver. Economic policy was debated over the following decades: proponents argued between the silver and gold standards, and whether the currency should be based on the yuan or the tael weights. The national government officially adopted the silver yuan as the base unit of currency in 1910. New imperial silver dollars began to be produced the following year in limited quantities.

Following the 1911 Revolution and the collapse of the Qing dynasty, the yuan was reaffirmed as the base unit of currency by the Beiyang government in 1913. The central mint in Tianjin had been rendered inoperable during the revolution, limiting the republic's early currency to already existing stockpiles of dragon dollars and various provincial issues. By early 1914, the Ministry of Finance had reopened the central mint, and restarted production of coinage with the old dragon dollar design. Two silver dollar designs, featuring President Sun Yat-sen (the memento dollar) and Vice President Li Yuanhong, were created in 1912. These mainly served as commemorative coins with limited circulation.

In 1914, the Legal Tender Act (國幣條例; Guóbì tiáolì) mandated the minting of domestic silver coinage in order to replace foreign coinage. Silver ingots, the Spanish dollar, and later its successor the Mexican peso had been used as the main forms of silver currency in the preceding century. Unlike prior Qing regulations, the new act stipulated that the national government had the sole right to produce coinage, and standardized its composition and weight.

Centralized production of a new silver dollar issue began by the end of 1914. It featured a portrait of the current president, Yuan Shikai, a former Qing general who served as the head of the Beiyang government. The coin remained in production after Yuan's tenure as the Hongxian Emperor in 1915–1916 and his death on 6 June 1916. Although Yuan was an unpopular figure after his death, the ubiquity and high quality of the coins allowed them to continue serving as the primary silver coinage.

== Design and specifications ==
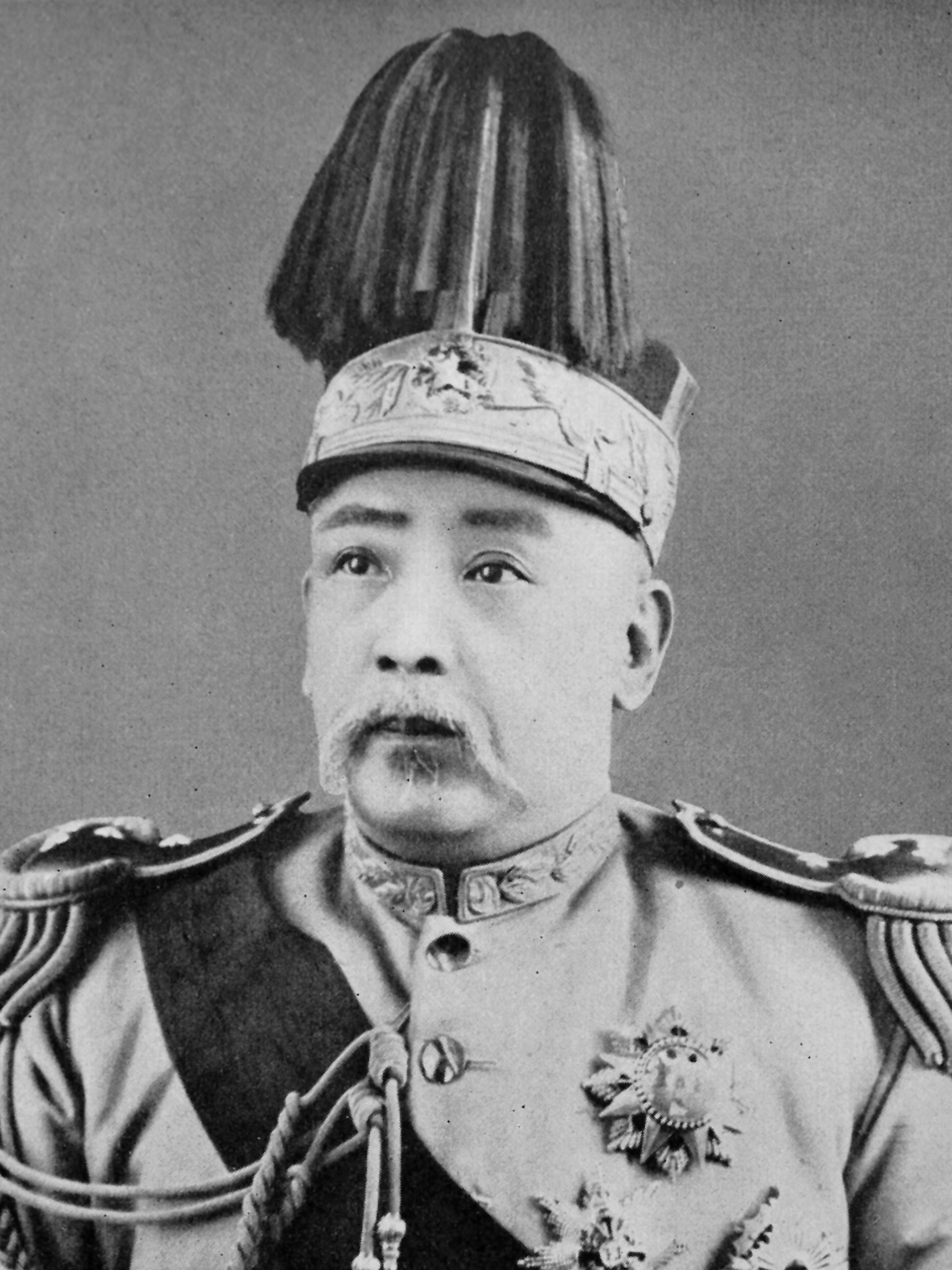
Yuan Shikai in 1915

In 1914, Luigi Giorgi, the chief engraver of the Tianjin Mint, produced the first design for a dollar featuring Yuan Shikai. It was a commemorative, non-circulating silver dollar featuring a front-facing bust of the president wearing a military uniform and a plumed hat. (Note: Not to be confused with another Luigi Giorgi, the chief engraver of the Rome Mint.) Following this, Giorgi designed a pattern design for a standard-issue, depicting Yuan in half-profile without a hat. Both of these depictions were based on photographs of Yuan, as Giorgi had not seen him in person. Giorgi presented a pattern coin to Yuan, but Yuan regarded his depiction as inaccurate and unflattering. Giorgi received permission to produce another design of the coin.

The final design of the standard issue featured a profile view of Yuan Shikai facing left on the obverse (front). He is depicted wearing a military uniform and a crew cut, although some nonstandard dies depict him as bald. On the reverse (back), taken from the original pattern issue, the coin's value of one yuan (壹圓; Yī yuán) is written, surrounded by a wreath of grain—likely barley.

The coin is 39 mm (1.5 in) in diameter and 2.66 mm (0.10 in) thick with a milled edge. The coins' weights vary by several grains, leading to sources differing on their standard weight. Its official weight was 72 candareen, or 72% of the Kuping tael weight. The definition of the Kuping tael was inconsistent during the Qing Dynasty, but was standardized as 37.301 g (1.316 oz) in late 1914, leading to a weight for the coin equal to 414.45 grains (26.857 g). Currency laws under the Republic allowed for a 3 per mil (0.08 g) variation in weight, although in practice the coins' weight often fell outside of the legal range. Its fineness (proportion of pure silver) was initially intended as .90 (i.e. 90% silver). However, as the recoinage incorporated large amounts of provincially minted imperial silver dollars, often of lower quality and fineness, this was reduced to .89.

=== Other denominations ===
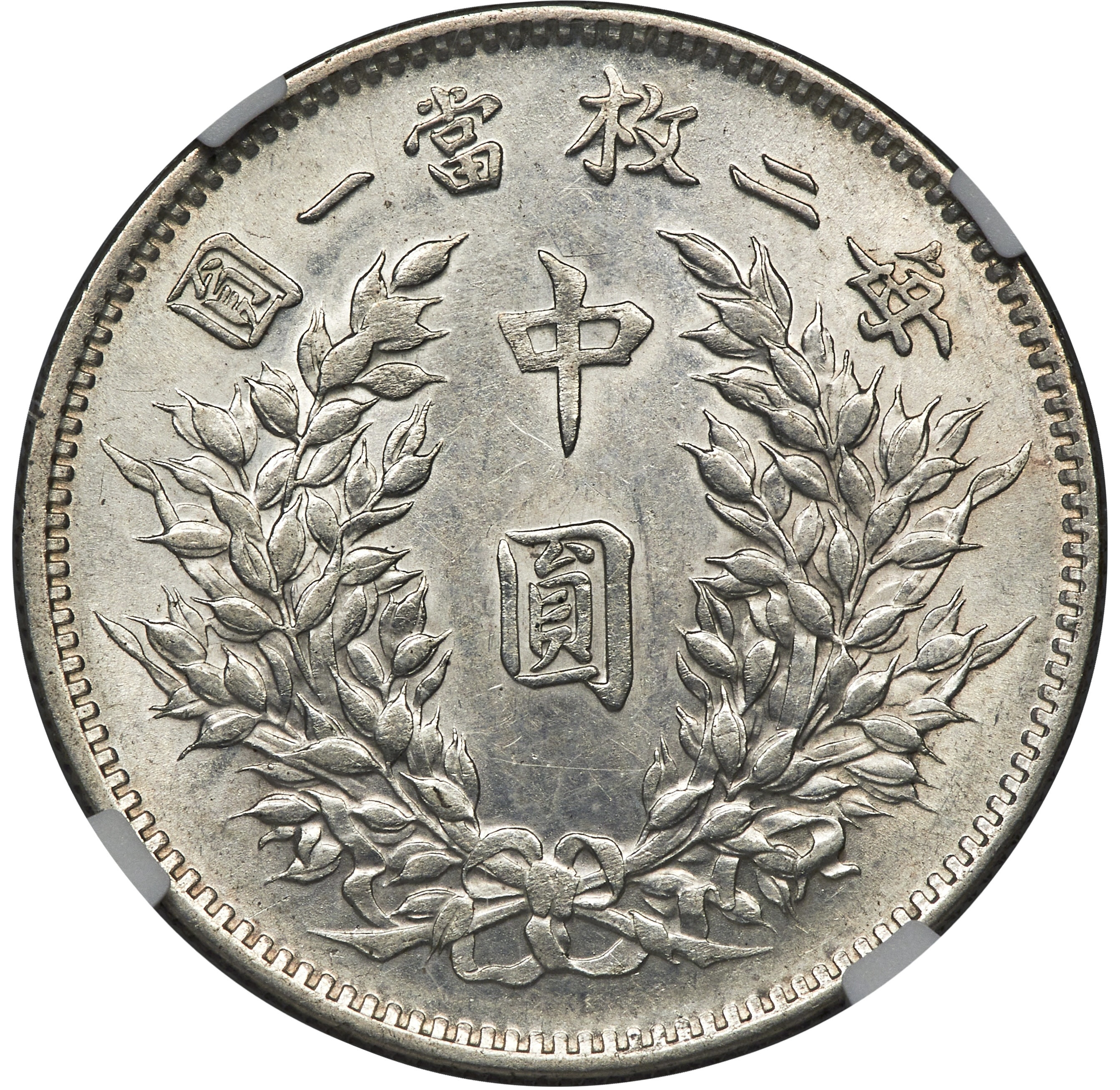
Reverse of 50 cent piece

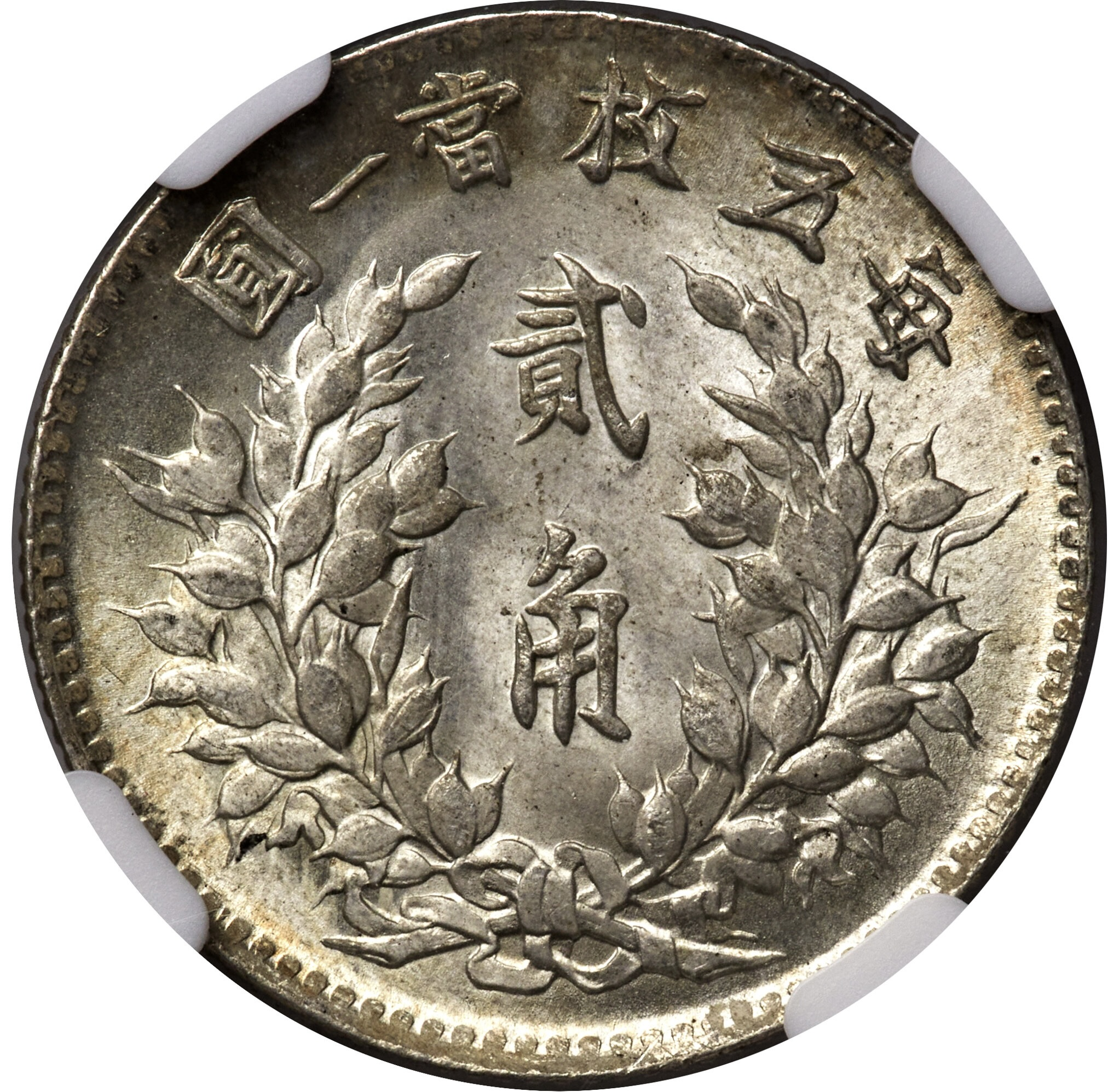
Reverse of 20 cent piece

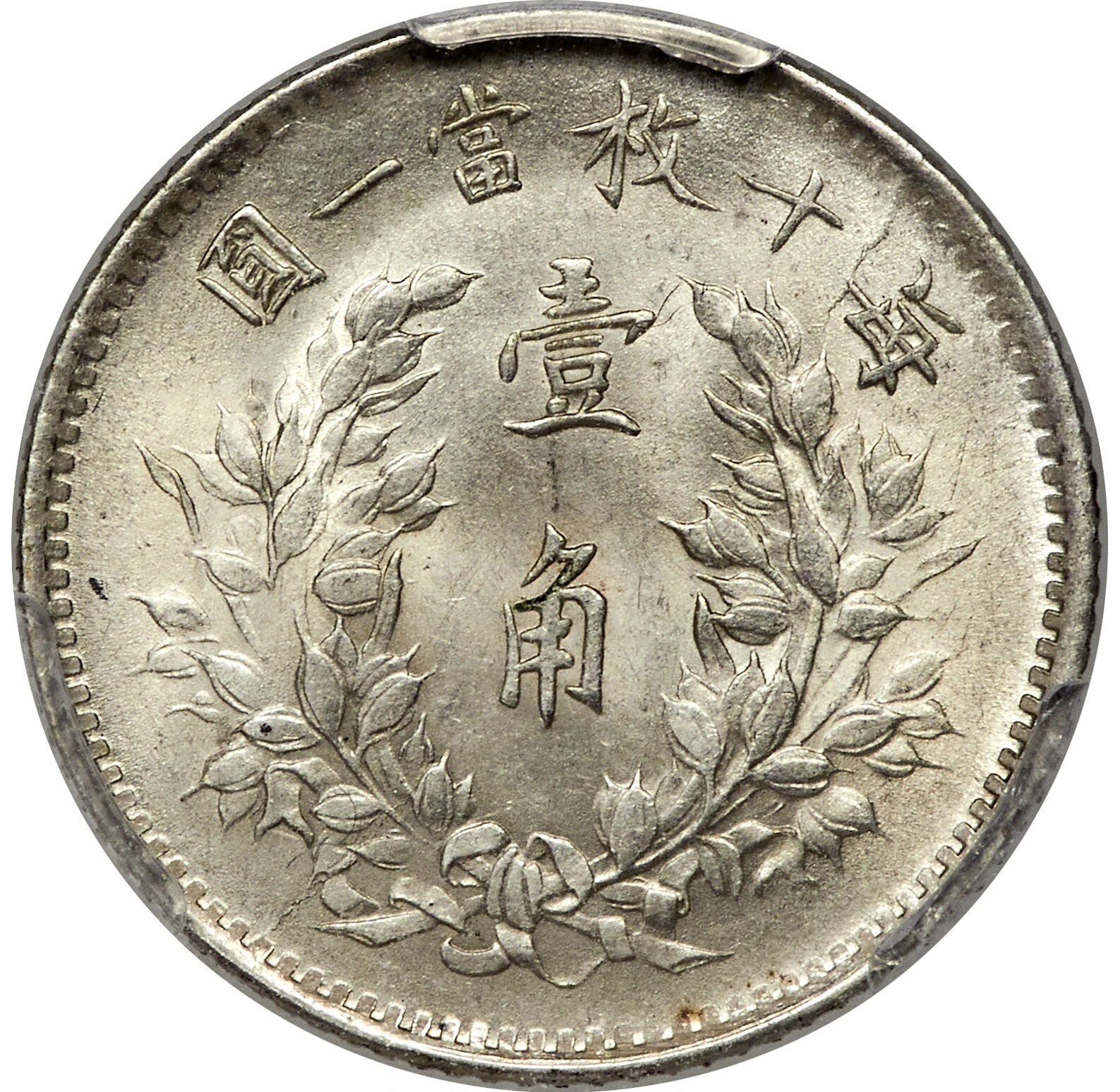
Reverse of 10 cent piece

Smaller denominations using the same design were approved alongside the dollar, marked in units of jiao, equivalent to ten cents. There were fifty-cent (five jiao or half-dollar), twenty-cent (two jiao), and ten-cent (one jiao) pieces, all struck in smaller quantities than the dollar coins. These lower denomination coins feature an identical obverse design to the dollar, with their respective denominations inside the wreath on the reverse. They were struck at a lower fineness of .70. Production of these denominations was delayed until September 1916 to allow for the dollar to circulate as the primary unit of currency. Prior to this, provincial twenty-cent pieces produced at Canton and Mukden fulfilled demand for small change.

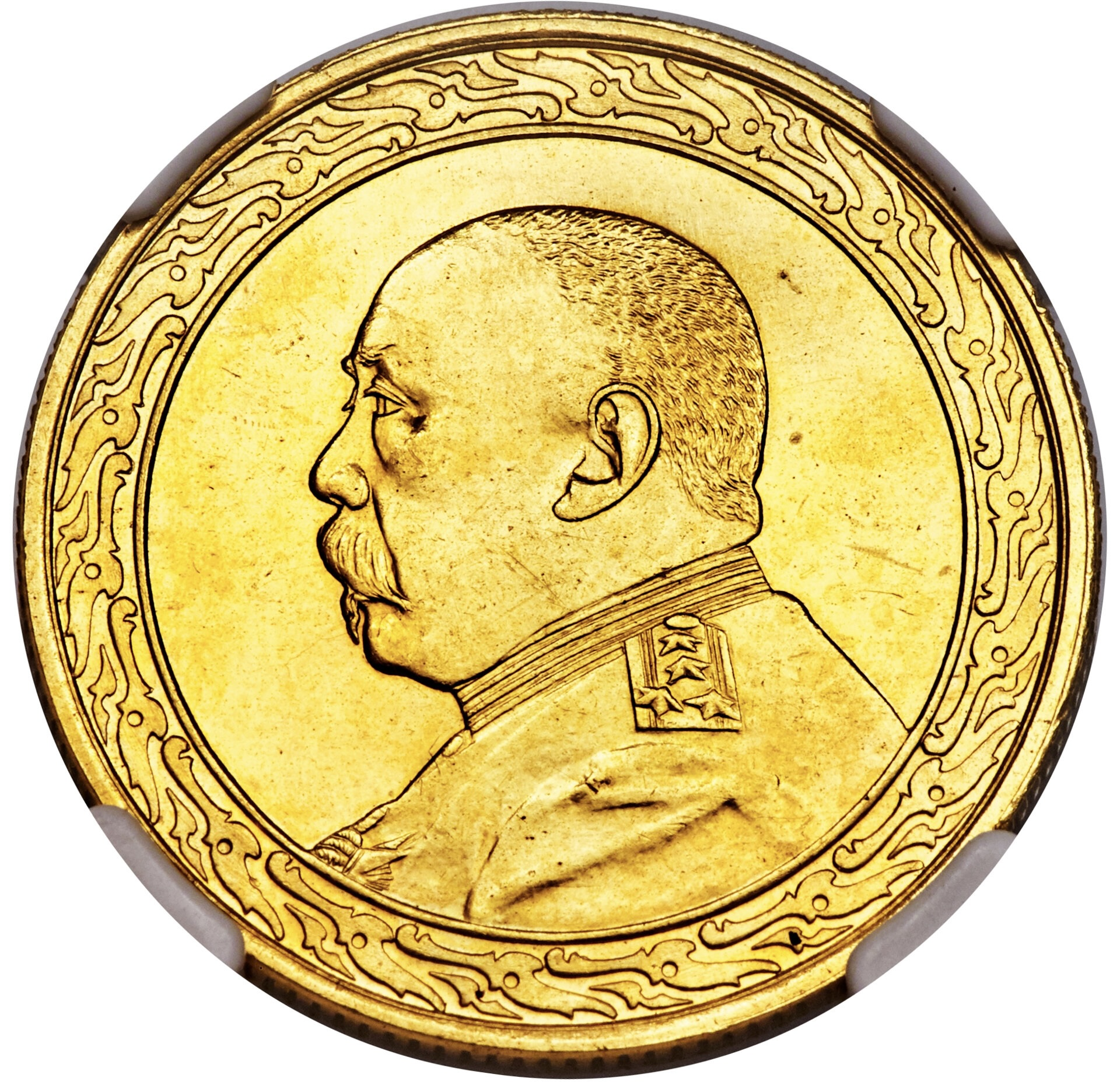
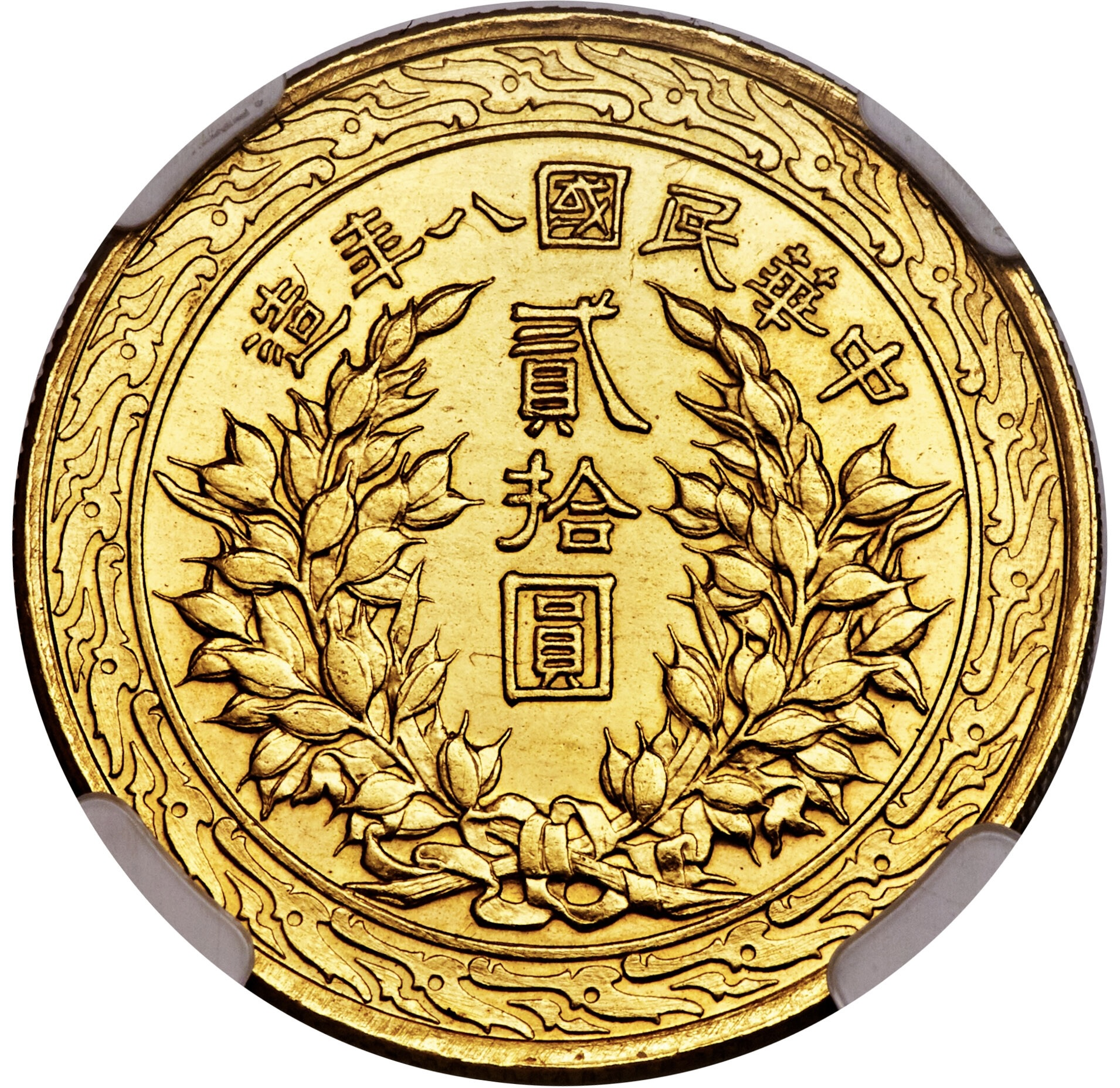
Gold twenty-dollar coin produced in 1919, featuring a unique design along the rim of both sides

The 1914 coinage reform laws outlined the production of cupronickel five-cent coins consisting of 75% copper. Pattern coins were produced at the Tianjin mint that year using the same design. However, nickel coinage was considered untrustworthy among the general public, and these patterns never circulated. Other five-cent patterns of the Yuan Shikai design are attested in silver, copper, and pewter, likely as proof or assay pieces.

In 1919, finance minister Cao Rulin investigated the prospect of introducing a standardized gold currency. The Tianjin mint produced ten-dollar and twenty-dollar denominations of gold coins with a modified version of the Yuan Shikai design. The obverse of the coins features the portrait surrounded by an ornamental design, while the reverse features the legend and a Year 8 date. These were produced in relatively small numbers and never circulated. The program was discontinued, and they were instead acquired by collectors.

== Production history ==
Production of the dollars began at the Tianjin Mint in December 1914. The Nanjing Mint followed in January 1915, alongside the Canton Mint at some point in the same year. Wuchang began minting the coin in 1916, alongside a comparatively tiny run of coins at Mukden. The dates on the coinage, given in the Republic of China calendar, are inconsistent and rarely reflect the actual year the coin was minted. From 1914 to 1919, all coinage in the series was marked as Year 3 (1914). Mints began to strike coins with new dates in 1920 (Year 9), although differing mints marked them as Year 8, 9, or 10, and in the following years no mint consistently updated the date to match the year of production.

Dollars are attested with dates of Year 3, 8, 9, and 10. (Note: corresponding to 1914, 1919, 1920, and 1921, respectively) The twenty-cent pieces bear dates of Year 3, 5, and 9; while the ten-cent pieces bear dates of Year 3 and 5. All half-dollars are dated Year 3. While the Year 3 dollars read 年三國民華中 (Nián sān guómín huázhōng; 'Year 3 of the Republic of China'), later issues of the dollar add the character 造 (Zào), with dates in the format 造年十國民華中 ('Made Year 10 of the Republic of China'). By 1922, most mints producing the Yuan Shikai dollar were minting the coin with a different date. These were intended as a way to identify which mint made a given coin, functionally serving as mint marks. Missionary Mildred Cable reported that Yuan Shikai dollars circulated in Gansu in 1926, but only coins featuring Year 3 dates were accepted at full value, as coins with dates following Yuan's death were suspected to be counterfeit.

Chinese banks grew uncomfortable with the coinage by 1917, as dollars lying slightly outside the legally prescribed weight and fineness were entering circulation. This problem was limited to only one or two mints, but due to identical dies between the different mints, the problematic coinage could not be traced to a particular origin. Complaints were filed with the Ministry of Finance in October 1917, but little was done to resolve the issue, as the Warlord Era and the steady loss of authority of the Beiyang Government led to less oversight over coinage.

In 1920, the Hangzhou Mint began producing the coin on behalf of the Bank of China and the Bank of Communications. In 1924, the Anqing mint in Anhui began issuing the coin (dated to Year 8) in small quantities. Anqing's production began to dramatically increase, making millions of significantly debased Year 8 coins struck at between .74 and .83 fineness. From December 1924 to July 1925, the mint reported making 1,217,000 Yuan Shikai dollars. After this, the mint stopped reporting its mintage figures to the national ministry. Due to the lack of reporting, the mint was closed in 1926.

The Mukden Mint struck the coin at a .73 fineness for a single day in June 1926, having previously halted the minting of the coin since its minor production run a decade prior. Reports attest that the mint struck the coin in 1927 and 1928, much of which was shipped out of Manchuria for use in Beijing. Production at Mukden likely returned at this time due to Fengtian clique warlord Zhang Zuolin's occupation of Beijing from 1926 to 1928. In February 1929, following the Northern Expedition and the Nationalist government's defeat of Zhang, the mint was ordered to switch production to the Nationalist government's restrikes of the 1912 Sun Yat-sen memento dollar.

A mint at Fuzhou, previously minting regional twenty-cent pieces, made large amounts of 10th-year Yuan Shikai dollars in 1924 or 1925. Little is known about the Fuzhou coins beyond that they were struck in substandard silver. The numismatist R. N. J. Wright estimated that the Anqing mint produced around 30 million coins, and Fuzhou produced around 5 million. He estimated that across China between 1915 and 1928, 620 million Year 3 dollars, 42 million Year 4 dollars, 28 million Year 9 Dollars, and 318 million Year 10 dollars were produced, totaling 1,008,000,000 coins.

Mintage figures for the Yuan Shikai dollar by mint
Date	Tianjin	Nanjing	Canton	Wuchang	Mukden	Hangzhou
1915 (M.4)	38,500,000	30,000,000	2,500,000	—N/a	—N/a	—N/a
1916 (M.5)	35,500,000	24,000,000	3,000,000	11,500,000	500,000	—N/a
1917 (M.6)	21,000,000	20,000,000	—N/a	6,500,000	—N/a	—N/a
1918 (M.7)	20,500,000	35,000,000	—N/a	15,000,000	—N/a	—N/a
1919 (M.8)	41,500,000	38,000,000	—N/a	23,000,000	—N/a	—N/a
1920 (M.9)	29,000,000	52,000,000	—N/a	16,500,000	—N/a	12,000,000
1921 (M.10)	7,000,000	15,500,000	—N/a	4,500,000	—N/a	—N/a
1922 (M.11)	2,000,000	25,500,000	—N/a	3,000,000	—N/a	39,000,000
1923 (M.12)	8,000,000	58,000,000	—N/a	1,000,000	—N/a	60,500,000
1924 (M.13)	—N/a	7,500,000	—N/a	—N/a	—N/a	7,500,000
1925 (M.14)	7,000,000	31,500,000	—N/a	2,500,000 (Note: Produced at Nanchang on behalf of the Wuchang mint.)	—N/a	78,000,000
1926 (M.15)	—N/a	29,000,000	—N/a	500,000	18,500,000 (Note: The United States Mint Reports stated mintage figures at Mukden of 10,000,000 in 1926, 7,000,000 in 1927, and 10,000,000 in 1928, but these figures are likely erroneous.)	29,500,000
1927 (M.16)	29,000,000	16,000,000	—N/a	—N/a	18,500,000	—N/a
1928 (M.17)	16,500,000	—N/a	—N/a	—N/a	18,500,000	—N/a
Total	255,500,000	382,500,000	5,500,000	84,000,000	19,000,000	226,500,000

== Economics ==
In 1915, the Shanghai Native Banker's Association, a prominent qianzhuang (local banking organization), ceased to recognize the imperial silver dollars, and began to calculate foreign exchange rates using the Yuan Shikai dollar. Silver prices rose over the course of the First World War, and exports declined. This led to a shortage of foreign silver coins (chiefly the Mexican peso), and the Yuan Shikai dollar quickly replaced them as the primary trade coin within China. Traditional forms of currency such as tael and copper cash coinage declined due to the primacy of the coin. In 1924, a Bank of Shanghai investigation found that the Yuan Shikai dollar had emerged as the primary form of currency in 47 out of 48 cities studied; the sole exception was Japanese-occupied Dalian, where yen coins and Bank of Chōsen banknotes predominated. Banknotes exchangeable for Yuan Shikai dollars gained prominence as copper currency use declined.

== Later production and use ==
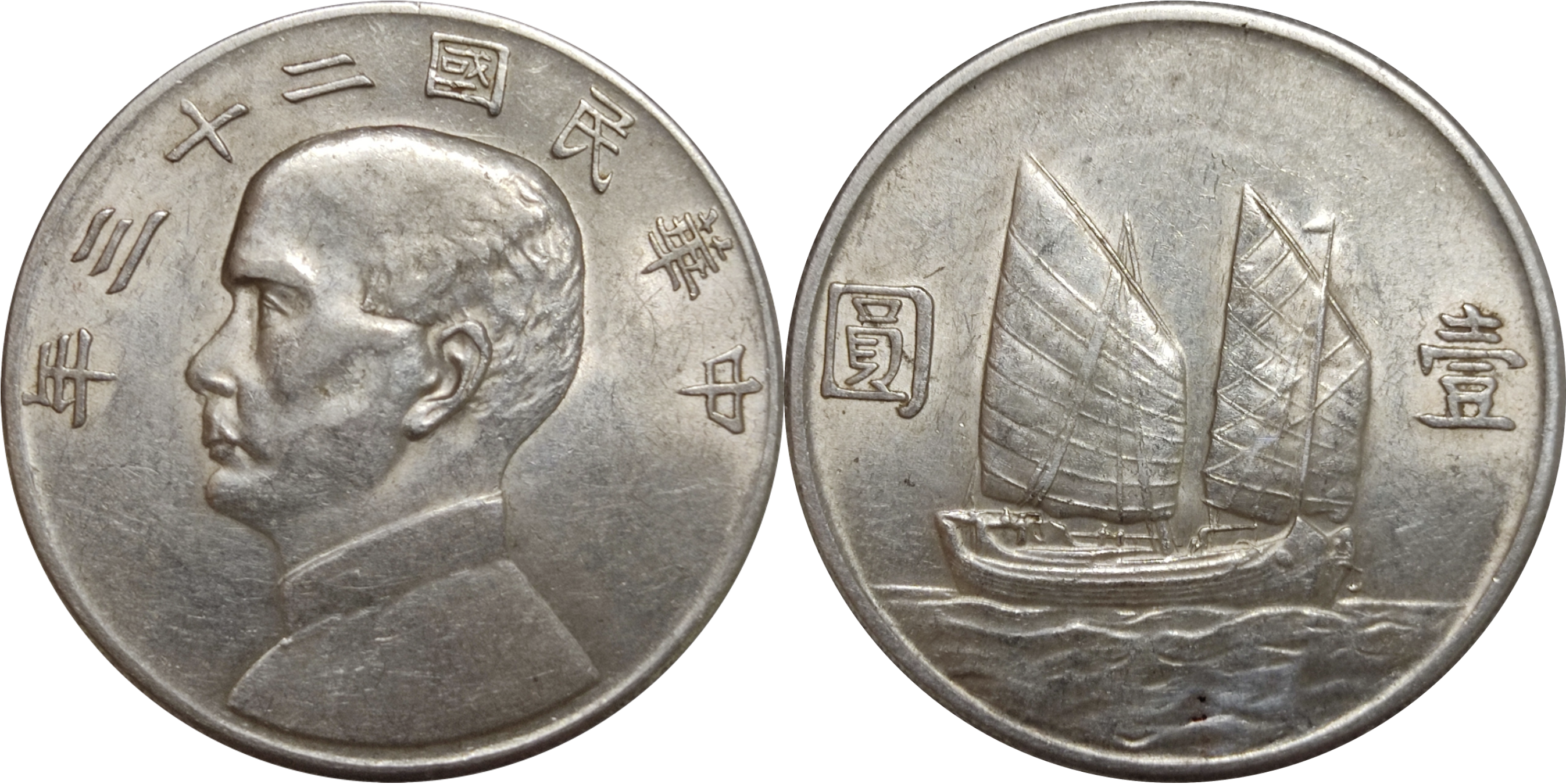
The junk dollar eventually replaced the Yuan Shikai dollar after the Northern Expedition.

Although the Nationalist government halted the minting of the coin in favor of the memento dollar (and later the junk dollar), local production of the Yuan dollars in areas outside of its control continued into the 1930s and 1940s. In 1930, the Gansu provincial government of warlord Feng Yuxiang began locally minting the dollars at .73 fineness, likely at Lanzhou. These were initially marked with the province's name along Yuan's portrait in 1930, but this label was later removed to allow the coin to circulate beyond the province. At least 5,370,000 dollars were made in Gansu.

During the mid-1930s, the Communist forces of the Chinese Soviet Republic began minting poor quality Yuan Shikai dollars with Year 3 dates alongside their own "Sichuan-Shaanxi Soviet" dollars. The Communist-made Yuan Shikai dollars have such crudely-produced dies that they appear visually similar to forgeries; however, unlike counterfeits from the period, they have a relatively high silver content of .70 to .80 fineness. In North Henan, local Communists hammered Yuan Shikai coins flat and then hammered Marxist designs (in one case, a portrait of Karl Marx) onto them.

China abruptly abandoned the silver standard in 1935. Large amounts of paper currency circulated in its place, halting the regional production of the Yuan Shikai dollar. Following large-scale inflation during the Second Sino-Japanese War (1937–1945) and the succeeding reemergence of the Chinese Civil War, the yuan entered hyperinflation in 1948–1949. Mints in the Nationalist-aligned southern and western provinces returned to minting silver coinage in an attempt to stabilize the currency.

The Canton Mint struck an eclectic mix of Memento, Junk, and 9th-year Yuan Shikai dollars for several months in 1949; this concurrent production led to mules (coins with sides from different designs) of all three coins during this period. In October 1949, the mint was evacuated to Haikou on the island of Hainan due to Communist military operations. The dollars produced on Hainan have different lettering and a "blurry" appearance, alongside reduced luster. In Nationalist-controlled Yunnan, 530,000 coins were minted in 1949. Concurrently, local Communist bureaus in Shenyang and Shanghai minted new Yuan Shikai dollars using old Year 3 dies, due to a lack of trust in paper money.

Additionally, the Nationalist government made inquiries to the Royal Mint and Birmingham Mint in the United Kingdom to supplement its coin production during hyperinflation. The Birmingham Mint engraved dies for 8th-year Yuan Shikai dollars and created several test strikes; both known examples featured the date 1949 written on the coins in pencil. No foreign production of Yuan Shikai coins was able to begin before the Communist victory in the war and the exile of the Nationalist government to Taiwan.

=== Postwar ===
From 1950 to 1951, the newly founded People's Republic of China occupied and annexed Tibet, placing the area under an autonomous administration headed by the 14th Dalai Lama. When the Communist government contracted laborers to construct infrastructure such as roadways, payment in paper Renminbi currency was viewed with suspicion and rejected by locals.

The government quickly exhausted its existing supply of silver and silver dollars. The Chengdu mint briefly made around 10,000 silver dollars in 1950 before production was halted. Using stockpiles of silver jewelry acquired from across the country, it restarted minting efforts to fulfill demand in Tibet, and minted large amounts of Year 3 Yuan Shikai dollars between 1951 and 1954. Additionally, two batches were made by the Shenyang mint in 1951. Specific mintage figures for production in this period is not available, but according to R. N. J. Wright, the coins likely numbered in the tens or hundreds of millions. They were of relatively high silver purity, with one example measuring .87 fineness. They also saw some circulation in rural areas of Yunnan and Guizhou, where hard money was also preferred. They were gradually withdrawn from circulation after 1954. Not counting contemporary counterfeits and issues made by local warlords and revolutionaries, the numismatist Kou Shangmin estimated that 1.1 billion Yuan Shikai dollars were produced between 1914 and 1954.

== Collecting ==
Yuan Shikai dollars are relatively inexpensive in comparison to other Chinese silver coins due to their very large mintage, leading them to be popular with coin collectors. The coins are nicknamed "fatman dollars" by collectors, from a mistranslation of their Chinese name, "big head Yuan Shikai [dollars]" (袁大头; Yuán dàtóu). They are also among the most frequently counterfeited Chinese coins, with counterfeit examples common for all four dates and several other major varieties.
