= Eduard Kann =

Austrian banker

Eduard Kann (Chinese: 耿愛德/闞恩, 1880–1962) was an Austrian banker and a specialist in Chinese numismatics. His book The Currencies of China (1926) was "immediately the standard work on the subject of metallic currencies in China"

== Life ==
Kann was born in Misslitz of Czech lands under Austria-Hungary. In 1902 he left Vienna to work for a London bank in China. He was employed by several banks, including the Russo-Asiatic Bank, the Banque Industrielle de Chine, and the Chinese-American Bank of Commerce, was stationed in Manchuria, then Tientsin (Tianjin) and became manager of the Commercial Guarantee Bank of Chihli. He was general manager of the Chinese-American Bank of Commerce from 1921. Between 1925 and 1949 he was an independent bullion broker in Shanghai, but interned by the Japanese (1941–42). After 1949 he taught briefly at Loyola University in Los Angeles, then retired to Hollywood.

== Kann's collections ==
After his death, Kann's collections were sold:

- Kann's Chinese stamp collection was sold by stamp dealer J R Hughes in February 1963.
- Kann's coin collection was sold in three sales – by Quality Sales Corporation: Kreisberg & Cohen, 1971–72.
- "The Eduard Kann collection of Chinese coins and old & curious monies" – sale by Schulman Coin & Mint, Inc (1971)
- Kann's Chinese banknote collection was sold by Bowers and Merena, in New York, 27–28 October 2008.
- Kann's collection of Chinese ingots is now at the British Museum
- Kann's papers 1949–1963 are at the American Numismatic Society.

== Publications ==
- The Currencies of China: An Investigation of Gold and Silver Transactions Affecting China; With a Section on Copper (Shanghai, 1926, 2nd ed., 1927)
- Copper Banknotes in China
- Paper Money in China and Elsewhere (Shanghai, 1929)
- The Central Bank of Canton (Shanghai, 1929?)
- Redemption Tables of China's Internal Loan Issues (Shanghai, 1933)
- The History of China's Internal Loan Issues (1934)
- Illustrated Catalog of Chinese Coins, Gold, Silver, Nickel and Aluminum (Los Angeles, 1954)
- The History of Chinese Paper Money From the Middle Ages Until 1961 (Walton-on-Naze, 1962?)
