= Canton Mint =

Mint in Guangdong (Canton), China

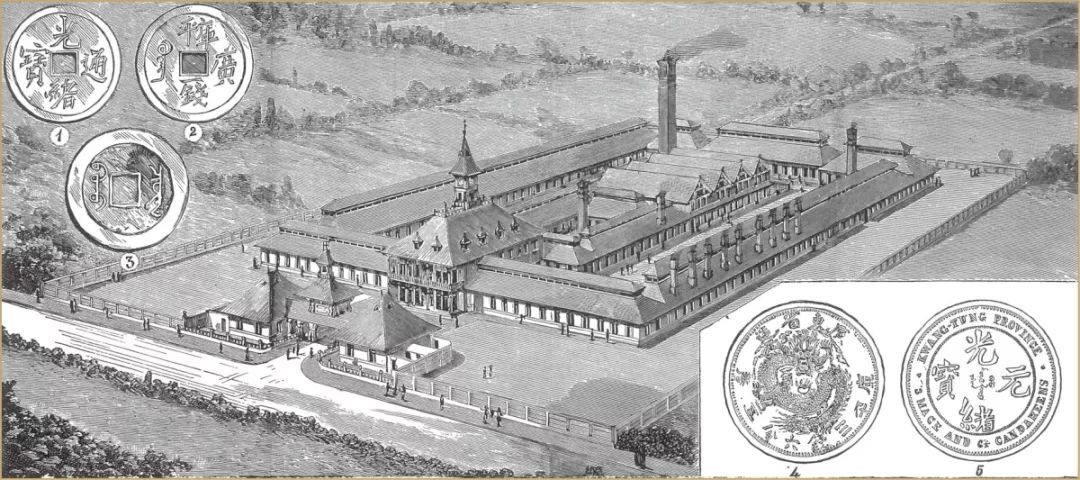
- Planned layout of the mint in 1888
- Industry: Minting
- Founded: 1889
- Defunct: 1949

The Canton Mint (Chinese: 廣東造幣廠 ;Cantonese Jyutping: gwong2 dung1 zou6 bai6 cong2) also romanised as Kwangtung Mint was a Chinese mint located in Canton (Guangzhou), Guangdong which produced coinage at the discretion of the Guangdong Provincial government. Opened in 1889 it was the first mint in China that used modern minting techniques and was at the time the largest mint in the world producing 2.7 million coins per day.

== History ==
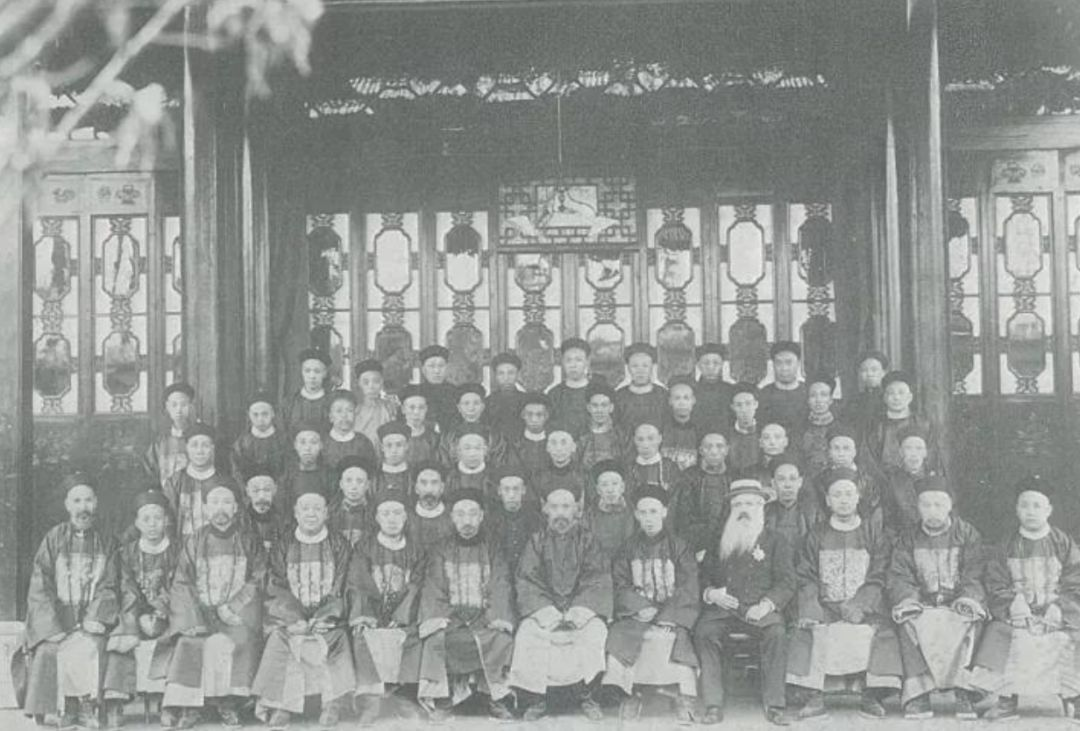
Photo of mint staff circa 1900

In 1887 as China began to modernise its minting methods British mint Heaton and Sons (later known as the Birmingham Mint) won a contract to build and equip a new mint in Guangdong province (Canton). Designed in England the new Canton Mint constructed in Chinese style was opened by Viceroy Zhang Zhidong on 25 May 1889 at a total cost of 1 million dollars. Measuring 200 meters and 130 meters wide the Canton Mint was the largest mint in the world operating 90 minting presses at once, compared to the US mint's six.

In its opening year, the mint produced the first Chinese Silver Dragon coins, which were based on Japanese and Korean designs.

The minted closed in 1931 and later briefly re-opened by the Kuomintang in 1949 before their retreat to Taiwan.
