= Silver Dragon (coin) =

East Asian silver coins

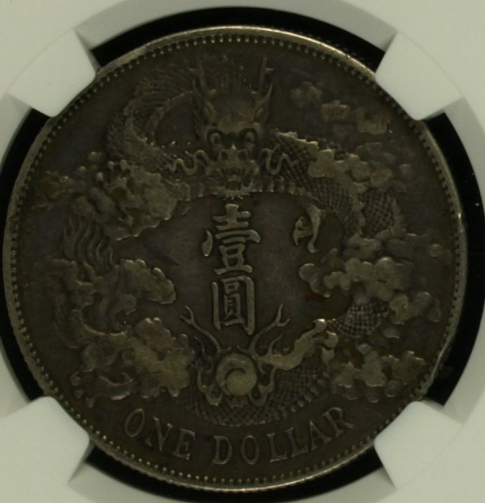
- 1911 China Silver Dollar — L&M-37 “No Period” (NGC XF40) Final coin produced by the Qing Dynasty under Xuantong (Puyi)
- Traditional Chinese: 龍銀
- Simplified Chinese: 龙银
- Literal meaning: dragon money
Transcriptions
Standard Mandarin
- Hanyu Pinyin: lóngyín
Hakka
- Pha̍k-fa-sṳ: liùng-ngiùn
Yue: Cantonese
- Yale Romanization: lùhng-ngàhn
- Jyutping: lung4ngan4
Southern Min
- Hokkien POJ: lêng-gîn
- Teochew Peng'im: lêng5ngeng5

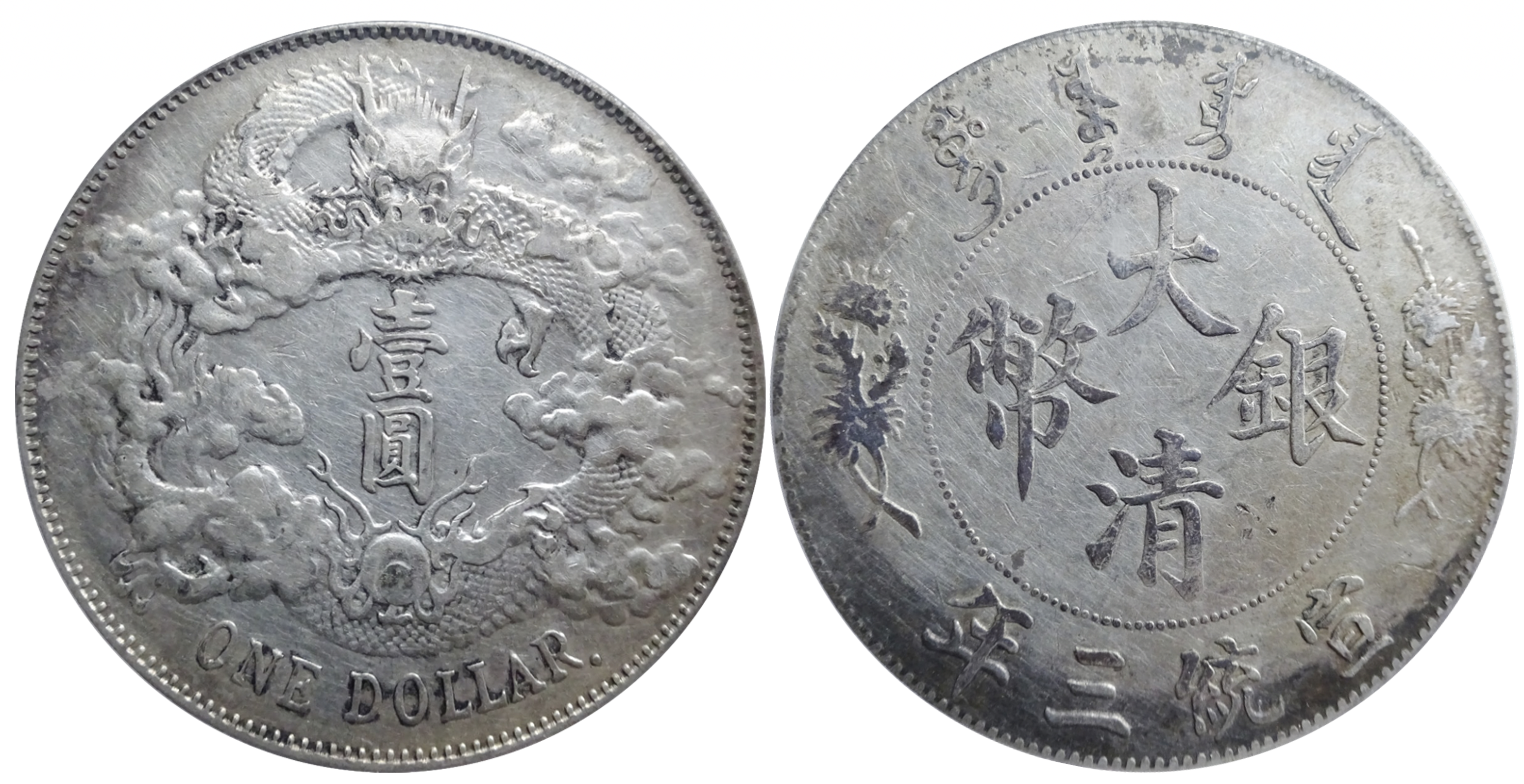
Silver coin: 1 yuan/dollar Xuantong 3rd year - 1911 Chopmark

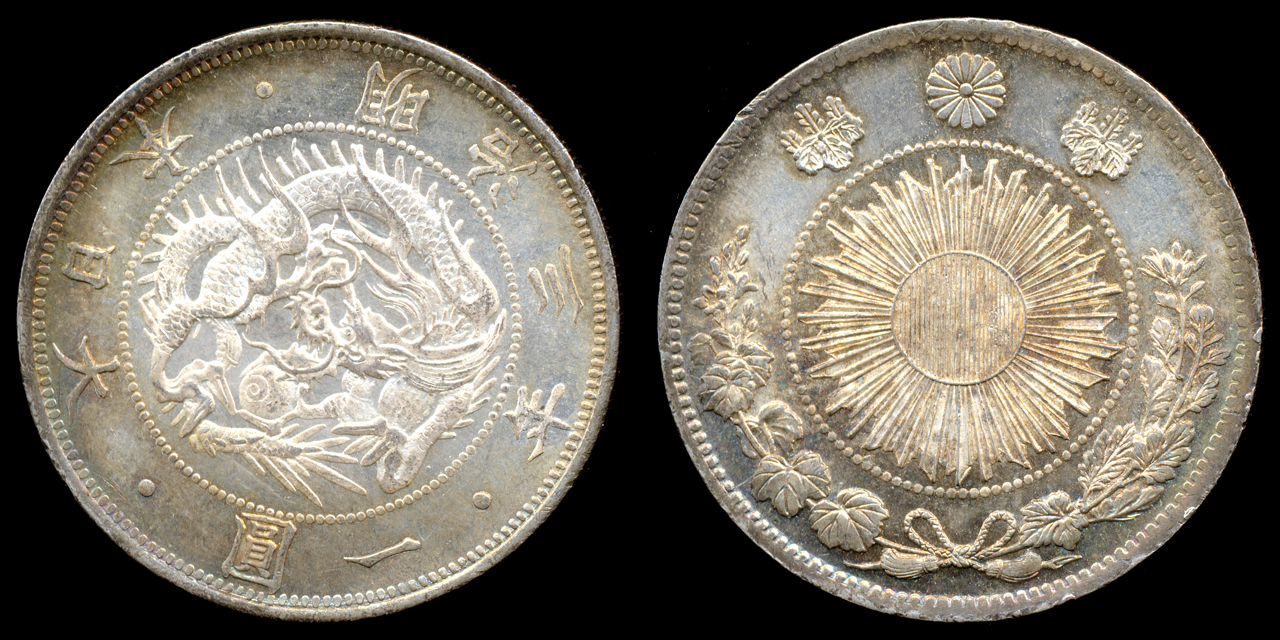
Japanese Silver Dragon, 1870

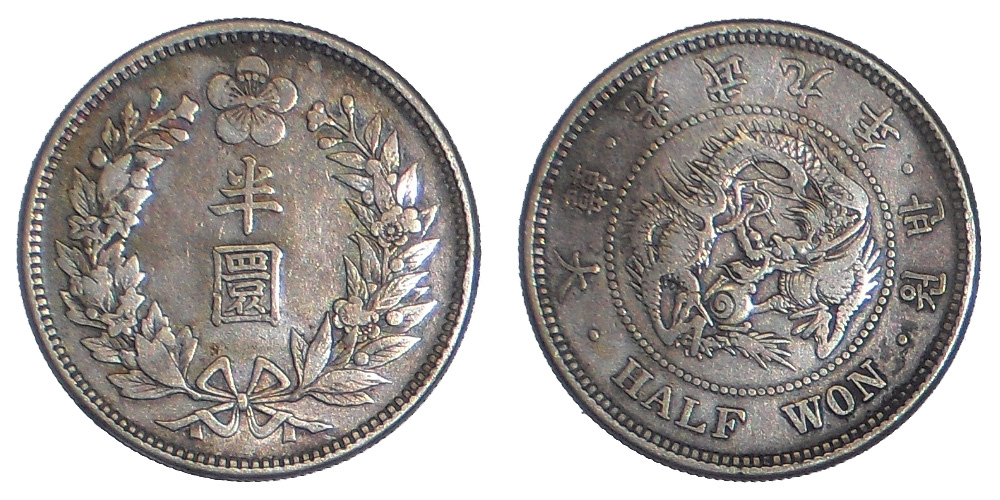
Korean half-won Silver Dragon, 1905

Silver Dragon coins, also sometimes known as Dragon dollars, are silver coins issued by China, Japan and later Korea for general circulation in their own countries. Featuring a dragon on the obverse of Japanese and Korean issues and on the reverse of Chinese issues, all were inspired by the silver Spanish dollar which following its introduction into the region in the 16th Century had set the standard for a de facto common currency for trade in the Far East, this specification being a weight of 27.22 grams and a fineness of .900; the coin thus contained 24.5 g (0.7876 troy oz) of silver.

== History ==
Following the establishment of the Spanish Philippines, Intramuros became an entrepôt for Chinese goods in one direction and silver, from across the Pacific to the Spanish held silver mines of Mexico, in the other. This so-called "Manila Galleons" trade route, led from the 16th Century onwards to the wide circulation and acceptance of "pieces of eight" in East Asia. Even after the end of the Spanish Empire in the Americas, Western nations wishing to trade with China found the preferred method of payment was the silver Mexican Peso, the successor of the Spanish dollar.

The high regard in which the Spanish-Mexican coins came to be held, led to the minting of silver Chinese yuan, Japanese yen and later Korean won coins to the same specifications as the Spanish ones i.e. a weight 7 mace and 2 candareens (approx. 27.22 grams or 420 grains) and a fineness of .900 (90%), for use as legal tender in their own countries. The name of these coins in all three countries derives from 圓, meaning round or circular object in all three languages, a link to these silver coins surviving in the modern names of the Chinese, Japanese and North and South Korean currencies, that is yuan, yen, and won.

These coins were joined in circulation by trade dollars and colonial currencies such as the Hong Kong dollar, Kiautschou dollar and the Straits dollar, which were produced to the same standard. Japan too would produce a trade dollar for external use which differed slightly from the yen coins it issued for its own use at home. The common standard to which all these coins were produced facilitated trade as theoretically they were interchangeable with one another on a one for one basis. However this was moderated by the fact that the general population were suspicious of coins that they were not familiar with and with some of the provincial mints in China producing debased coins; having a lower silver content and therefore less valuable because of it.

=== China ===
Chinese coins of this type are known Kwangtung dollars from the old romanisation of the name of the mint that they were first produced in China, more popularly they are known in Chinese as 龍銀, literally "Dragon Silver" or "Dragon Money", 銀 capable of being read as both silver or money.

Even before the official ending of the Qing dynasty factions and cliques emerged as would be warlords jostled for position and influence. As China headed into the republican and warlord eras, local warlords used the provincial mints to issue their own Silver Dragons, these are of variable quality and value. These warlord and pre-warlord era coins include high quality coins intended to promote the legitimacy and prestige of the warlord and his faction and are proudly marked as such; there are also low quality coins, the majority, intended to deceive the receiver into believing that they are earlier coins of higher silver content and value, though not fake-in so much that they came from semi-official sources-these were and are of variable value depending on their silver content. With the coming of the Chinese republic China would continue producing silver coins of the same specification updated to bear the image of Yuan Shikai and other politicians. China was forced from the silver standard in 1935, however even after the silver coins became demonetised they remained a highly prized means of preserving wealth in an era of inflation and war.

== Opium War 'Silver' ==
During the mid-years of what is known as the Opium War, where most of the country's silver was exported to Europe and India due to the purchase of opium. The silver content of the coins was changed to 80% of silver and during the height of the silver famine was reduced down to as little as 40% silver. The rest of the coins composition varied, however coins minted by the Imperial mint used brass, copper and finally iron to fill the rest of the weight of the coin. Merchant "silver dollars", that is, coins that were minted for use in the bartering with merchant sailors and on the silk road, were 90% silver.

=== Legacy ===
The first Chinese Silver Panda collectable silver bullion coins were of the traditional specification of 27grams in weight, 0.900 fineness.

== Collecting ==
Collecting silver dragon coins especially Chinese ones can be a financially hazardous prospect, with even experienced experts falling foul of fakes. There are modern fakes of genuine coins, historical fakes of genuine coins, and today given that some of the historical fakes have gained a numismatic value of their own, modern fakes of historical fakes.

== Bibliography ==
- Krause, Chester L.; Clifford Mishler (1991). Standard Catalog of World Coins: 1801–1991 (18th ed.). Krause Publications. ISBN 0873411501.
- Krause, Chester L.; Clifford Mishler (2003). 2004 Standard Catalog of World Coins: 1901–Present. Colin R. Bruce II (senior editor) (31st ed.). Krause Publications. ISBN 0873495934.
